= 2017–18 Atalanta BC season =

Atalanta
2017–18 season
- President: Antonio Percassi
- Manager: Gian Piero Gasperini
- Stadium: Stadio Atleti Azzurri d'Italia
- Serie A: 7th
- Coppa Italia: Semi-finals
- UEFA Europa League: Round of 32
- Top goalscorer: League: Josip Iličić (11); All: Josip Iličić (15)
- Highest home attendance: 20,076 vs Internazionale (14 April 2018, Serie A)
- Lowest home attendance: 3,867 vs Sassuolo (20 December 2017, Coppa Italia)
- Average home league attendance: 17,921
Home colours	Away colours	Third colours

The 2017–18 season was Atalanta Bergamasca Calcio's seventh consecutive season in Serie A. The club competed in Serie A and the Coppa Italia, and had qualified for the group stage of the UEFA Europa League following a fourth-place finish the previous season, the club's best league result at the time.

The season was coach Gian Piero Gasperini's second at the club. Atalanta ended the season in 7th, qualifying for the second qualifying round of the 2018–19 UEFA Europa League. The club was eliminated in the Coppa Italia by eventual winners Juventus, in the semi-finals.

== Players ==
=== Squad information ===
Last updated on 20 May 2018
Appearances include league matches only

No.	Name	Nat	Position(s)	Date of birth (Age at end of season)	Signed from	Signed in	Contract ends	Apps.	Goals	Notes
Goalkeepers
1	Etrit Berisha	(Albania)	GK	10 March 1989 (aged 29)	(Italy) Lazio	2017	2021	57	0	
31	Francesco Rossi	(Italy)	GK	27 April 1991 (aged 27)	(Italy) Youth Sector	2009	2018	1	0	
91	Pierluigi Gollini	(Italy)	GK	18 March 1995 (aged 23)	(England) Aston Villa	2017	2018	11	0	
Defenders
3	Rafael Toloi	(Brazil)	CB	10 October 1990 (aged 27)	(Brazil) São Paulo	2015	2020	87	2	
5	Andrea Masiello	(Italy)	CB / RB	5 February 1986 (aged 32)	(Italy) Bari	2011	2018	126	8	Vice Captain
6	José Luis Palomino	(Argentina)	CB	5 January 1990 (aged 28)	(Bulgaria) Ludogorets Razgrad	2017	2020	26	1	
13	Mattia Caldara	(Italy)	CB	5 May 1994 (aged 24)	(Italy) Juventus	2017	2018	55	10	
21	Timothy Castagne	(Belgium)	RB / RM	5 December 1995 (aged 22)	(Belgium) Genk	2017	2020	20	0	
28	Gianluca Mancini	(Italy)	CB	17 April 1996 (aged 22)	(Italy) Perugia	2017	2020	11	1	
33	Hans Hateboer	(Netherlands)	RB / RM	9 January 1994 (aged 24)	(Netherlands) Groningen	2017	2020	39	0	
37	Leonardo Spinazzola	(Italy)	LWB / LB / LM	25 March 1993 (aged 25)	(Italy) Juventus	2016	2018	48	0	
95	Alessandro Bastoni	(Italy)	CB	13 April 1999 (aged 19)	(Italy) Internazionale	2017	2019	7	0	
Midfielders
4	Bryan Cristante	(Italy)	CM	3 March 1995 (aged 23)	(Portugal) Benfica	2017	2018	48	12	
8	Robin Gosens	(Germany)	LM / LB / LWB	5 July 1994 (aged 23)	(Netherlands) Heracles Almelo	2017	2020	21	1	
11	Remo Freuler	(Switzerland)	CM	15 April 1992 (aged 26)	(Switzerland) Luzern	2016	2019	74	11	
15	Marten de Roon	(Netherlands)	CM / DM	29 March 1991 (aged 27)	(England) Middlesbrough	2017	2022	34	3	
19	Luca Rizzo	(Italy)	CM	24 April 1992 (aged 26)	(Italy) Bologna	2018	2018	0	0	
23	Filippo Melegoni	(Italy)	DM	18 February 1999 (aged 19)	(Italy) Youth Sector	2016	2021	1	0	
32	Nicolas Haas	(Switzerland)	CM	23 January 1996 (aged 22)	(Switzerland) Luzern	2017	2021	9	0	
72	Josip Iličić	(Slovenia)	AM / RW / SS	29 January 1988 (aged 30)	(Italy) Fiorentina	2017	2020	31	11	
88	João Schmidt	(Brazil)	CM	19 May 1993 (aged 25)	(Brazil) São Paulo	2017	2020	0	0	
Forwards
9	Andreas Cornelius	(Denmark)	ST / CF	16 March 1993 (aged 25)	(Denmark) Copenhagen	2017	2020	23	3	
10	Alejandro Gómez	(Argentina)	LW / SS	15 February 1988 (aged 30)	(Ukraine) Metalist Kharkiv	2014	2022	128	32	Club Captain
29	Andrea Petagna	(Italy)	ST / CF	30 June 1995 (aged 23)	(Italy) Milan	2016	2020	63	8	
99	Musa Barrow	(The Gambia)	CF / LW	14 November 1998 (aged 19)	(Italy) Youth Sector	2017	2020	12	3	
Players transferred during the season
7	Riccardo Orsolini	(Italy)	RW	24 January 1997 (aged 21)	(Italy) Juventus	2017	2018	8	0	
20	Luca Vido	(Italy)	ST / CF	3 February 1997 (aged 21)	(Italy) Milan	2017	2020	4	0	
27	Jasmin Kurtić	(Slovenia)	AM / CM	10 January 1989 (aged 29)	(Italy) Sassuolo	2015	2019	83	10	

== Transfers ==
=== In ===
Date	Pos.	Player	Age	Moving from	Fee	Notes	Source
2 June 2017	MF	(Germany) Robin Gosens	22	(Netherlands) Heracles Almelo	Undisclosed		
8 June 2017	MF	(Switzerland) Nicolas Haas	21	(Switzerland) Luzern	Undisclosed		
21 June 2017	GK	(Albania) Etrit Berisha	28	(Italy) Lazio	€5M	Bought out loan	
29 June 2017	DF	(Argentina) José Luis Palomino	27	(Bulgaria) Ludogorets Razgrad	€4M		
30 June 2017	DF	(Italy) Fabio Eguelfi	22	(Italy) Internazionale	Undisclosed		
1 July 2017	MF	(Brazil) João Schmidt	24	(Brazil) São Paulo	Free		
1 July 2017	FW	(Italy) Luca Vido	20	(Italy) Milan	Undisclosed		
5 July 2017	MF	(Slovenia) Josip Iličić	29	(Italy) Fiorentina	€5.5M		
7 July 2017	DF	(Belgium) Timothy Castagne	21	(Belgium) Genk	Undisclosed		
7 July 2017	MF	(Italy) Matteo Pessina	20	(Italy) Milan	Free	Part of the Andrea Conti deal	
10 August 2017	MF	(Netherlands) Marten de Roon	26	(England) Middlesbrough	€13.5M	€13.5M + €1.5M in bonuses	

==== Loans in ====
Date	Pos.	Player	Age	Moving from	Fee	Notes	Source
14 July 2017	FW	(Italy) Riccardo Orsolini	20	(Italy) Juventus	Loan	2-year loan with option and counter-option	
13 January 2018	MF	(Italy) Luca Rizzo	25	(Italy) Bologna	Loan	Loan with an option to buy	

=== Out ===
Date	Pos.	Player	Age	Moving to	Fee	Notes	Source
1 July 2017	MF	(Italy) Alberto Grassi	22	(Italy) Napoli	Loan return		
1 July 2017	DF	(France) Abdoulay Konko	33	Unattached	End of contract		
1 July 2017	MF	(Italy) Giulio Migliaccio	36	Retired			
1 July 2017	MF	(Italy) Cristian Raimondi	36	Retired			
1 July 2017	DF	(Bosnia and Herzegovina) Ervin Zukanović	30	(Italy) Roma	Loan return		
7 July 2017	DF	(Italy) Andrea Conti	23	(Italy) Milan	€24M	€24M + Matteo Pessina	
31 August 2017	DF	(Italy) Alessandro Bastoni	18	(Italy) Internazionale	Undisclosed	Player will remain on loan at Atalanta until 2019	
11 January 2018	MF	(Slovenia) Jasmin Kurtić	29	(Italy) SPAL	Undisclosed		
13 January 2018	DF	(Senegal) Boukary Dramé	32	(Italy) SPAL	Undisclosed		
31 January 2018	FW	(Italy) Riccardo Orsolini	21	(Italy) Juventus	Loan return		

==== Loans out ====
Date	Pos.	Player	Age	Moving to	Fee	Notes	Source
2 June 2017	MF	(Ivory Coast) Franck Kessié	20	(Italy) Milan	€28M	2-year loan with an obligation to buy	
7 July 2017	FW	(Italy) Alberto Paloschi	27	(Italy) SPAL	Loan	Loan with an option to buy	
18 January 2018	FW	(Italy) Luca Vido	20	(Italy) Cittadella	Loan		

== Pre-season and friendlies ==
1 August 2017 Friendly	Atalanta (Italy)	1–0	(Germany) Borussia Dortmund	Altach, Austria
19:30 CEST (UTC+02:00)	Iličić 71'	Report		Stadium: CASHPOINT Arena; Attendance: 6,071; Referee: Robert Schörgenhofer (Austria)

2 August 2017 Friendly	Atalanta	1–0	Novara	Zingonia, Italy
--:-- CEST (UTC+02:00)	Mancini 52'	Report

11 August 2017 Trofeo Naranja	Valencia (Spain)	1–2	(Italy) Atalanta	Valencia, Spain
--:-- CEST (UTC+02:00)	Vezo 20'	Report	Toloi 13'; Palomino 66'	Stadium: Mestalla; Referee: Juan Martínez Munuera

12 August 2017 Friendly	Atalanta	1–1	Venezia	Bergamo, Italy
	Vido 80'	Report	Mlakar 78'	Stadium: Stadio Atleti Azzurri d'Italia; Referee: Marco Piccinini

== Competitions ==
=== Serie A ===
==== League table ====
Pos	Team	Pld	W	D	L	GF	GA	GD	Pts	Qualification or relegation
5	Lazio	38	21	9	8	89	49	+40	71 (Note: Lazio were deducted 1 point by the Italian Football Federation)	Qualification to Europa League group stage (Note: Since the winners of the 2017–18 Coppa Italia, Juventus, qualified for European competition based on league position, the spot awarded to the cup winners (Europa League group stage) was passed to the sixth-placed team and the spot awarded to the sixth-placed team (Europa League second qualifying round) was passed to the seventh-placed team.)
6	Milan (Note: Milan was originally banned from European competition due to violations against Financial Fair Play regulations. They appealed to the Court of Arbitration for Sport, and the ban was overturned on 20 July 2018.)	38	18	10	10	56	42	+14	64	Qualification to Europa League group stage
7	Atalanta	38	16	12	10	57	39	+18	60	Qualification to Europa League second qualifying round
8	Fiorentina	38	16	9	13	54	46	+8	57	
9	Torino	38	13	15	10	54	46	+8	54	

Source: Serie A, Soccerway
Rules for classification: 1) Points; 2) Head-to-head points; 3) Head-to-head goal difference; 4) Goal difference; 5) Goals scored; 6) Draw.

==== Results summary ====
Overall								Home						Away					
Pld	W	D	L	GF	GA	GD	Pts	W	D	L	GF	GA	GD	W	D	L	GF	GA	GD
38	16	12	10	57	39	+18	60	9	6	4	30	18	+12	7	6	6	27	21	+6

Last updated: 20 May 2018.
Source: Competitive matches

==== Results by round ====
Round	1	2	3	4	5	6	7	8	9	10	11	12	13	14	15	16	17	18	19	20	21	22	23	24	25	26	27	28	29	30	31	32	33	34	35	36	37	38
Ground	H	A	H	A	H	A	H	A	H	H	A	H	A	H	A	A	H	A	H	A	H	A	H	A	H	A	H	A	A	H	A	H	A	H	H	A	H	A
Result	L	L	W	D	W	D	D	L	W	W	L	D	L	W	D	W	D	W	L	W	L	W	W	D	D	L	L	W	W	W	D	D	W	W	W	D	D	L
Position	16	18	13	11	9	9	11	12	12	9	10	10	12	10	10	8	7	7	9	7	8	8	7	8	8	8	8	8	8	7	9	8	7	6	6	7	7	7

Updated to match(es) played on 20 May 2018. Source: Competitive matches
A = Away; H = Home; W = Win; D = Draw; L = Loss

==== Matches ====
20 August 2017 1	Atalanta	0–1	Roma	Bergamo
18:00 CEST (UTC+02:00)	Toloi (yellow card) 69'	Report	Kolarov 31'; Defrel (yellow card) 55'; Nainggolan (yellow card) 90'	Stadium: Stadio Atleti Azzurri d'Italia; Attendance: 19,108; Referee: Piero Giacomelli

27 August 2017 2	Napoli	3–1	Atalanta	Naples
20:45 CEST (UTC+02:00)	Koulibaly (yellow card) 54'; Zieliński 56'; Mertens 61'; Rog 87'	Report	Cristante 15'; Kurtić (yellow card) 77'; De Roon (yellow card) 90+1'	Stadium: Stadio San Paolo; Attendance: 35,102; Referee: Marco Di Bello

10 September 2017 3	Atalanta	2–1	Sassuolo	Bergamo
15:00 CEST (UTC+02:00)	Cornelius 35'; Petagna 77'	Report	Sensi 27'; Magnanelli (yellow card) 53'	Stadium: Stadio Atleti Azzurri d'Italia; Attendance: 16,120; Referee: Fabrizio Pasqua

17 September 2017 4	Chievo	1–1	Atalanta	Verona
18:00 CEST (UTC+02:00)	Cesar (yellow card) 41'; Bastien (yellow card) 44', (goal) 52'	Report	Gómez 85' (pen.)	Stadium: Stadio Marc'Antonio Bentegodi; Attendance: 10,000; Referee: Maurizio Mariani

20 September 2017 5	Atalanta	5–1	Crotone	Bergamo
20:45 CEST (UTC+02:00)	Petagna 5'; Caldara 25'; Iličić 38'; Gómez 63', 74' (pen.)	Report	Ajeti (yellow card) 45+2'; Tumminello 70'	Stadium: Stadio Atleti Azzurri d'Italia; Attendance: 16,378; Referee: Marco Piccinini

24 September 2017 6	Fiorentina	1–1	Atalanta	Florence
20:45 CEST (UTC+02:00)	Chiesa 12', (yellow card) 40'; Biraghi (yellow card) 51'	Report	Spinazzola (yellow card) 13'; De Roon (yellow card) 30'; Mancini (yellow card) 58'; Castagne (yellow card) 75'; Freuler 90+4'; Cristante (yellow card) 90+5'	Stadium: Stadio Artemio Franchi; Attendance: 21,390; Referee: Luca Pairetto
Note: Bryan Cristante was cautioned for dissent while a substitute.

1 October 2017 7	Atalanta	2–2	Juventus	Bergamo
20:45 CEST (UTC+02:00)	Caldara 31'; Gómez (yellow card) 64'; Cristante 67'; Palomino (yellow card) 80'; Petagna (yellow card) 82'	Report	Bernardeschi 21'; Higuaín 24'; Lichtsteiner (yellow card) 58'	Stadium: Stadio Atleti Azzurri d'Italia; Attendance: 19,962; Referee: Antonio Damato

15 October 2017 8	Sampdoria	3–1	Atalanta	Genoa
15:00 CEST (UTC+02:00)	Silvestre (yellow card) 44'; Zapata 56'; Caprari 59', (yellow card) 60'; Linetty 68'; Regini (yellow card) 85'	Report	Cristante 21', (yellow card) 90+1'; Freuler (yellow card) 41'; Hateboer (yellow card) 75'	Stadium: Stadio Luigi Ferraris; Attendance: 19,672; Referee: Maurizio Mariani

22 October 2017 9	Atalanta	1–0	Bologna	Bergamo
15:00 CEST (UTC+02:00)	Caldara (yellow card) 14'; Iličić (yellow card) 30'; De Roon (yellow card) 40'; Cornelius 71'	Report	Masina (yellow card) 42'; Palacio (yellow card) 56'; González (yellow card) 74' (yellow-red card) 80'	Stadium: Stadio Atleti Azzurri d'Italia; Attendance: 18,205; Referee: Fabio Maresca

25 October 2017 10	Atalanta	3–0	Hellas Verona	Bergamo
18:30 CEST (UTC+02:00)	Freuler 50'; Iličić 59'; Kurtić 75'	Report		Stadium: Stadio Atleti Azzurri d'Italia; Attendance: 16,768; Referee: Livio Marinelli

29 October 2017 11	Udinese	2–1	Atalanta	Udine
15:00 CET (UTC+01:00)	De Paul 45+1' (pen.); Barák 68'	Report	Kurtić 29'; Toloi (yellow card) 41'; Castagne (yellow card) 56'	Stadium: Dacia Arena; Attendance: 16,448; Referee: Gianluca Rocchi

5 November 2017 12	Atalanta	1–1	SPAL	Bergamo
18:00 CET (UTC+01:00)	Cristante 23'; Freuler (red card) 69'	Report	Felipe (yellow card) 61'; Rizzo 63'; Mattiello (yellow card) 88'	Stadium: Stadio Atleti Azzurri d'Italia; Attendance: 17,042; Referee: Daniele Chiffi

19 November 2017 13	Internazionale	2–0	Atalanta	Milan
20:45 CET (UTC+01:00)	Icardi 51', 60'	Report	Palomino (yellow card) 48'; Kurtić (yellow card) 54'	Stadium: San Siro; Attendance: 52,177; Referee: Michael Fabbri

27 November 2017 14	Atalanta	1–0	Benevento	Bergamo
20:45 CET (UTC+01:00)	De Roon (yellow card) 51'; Cristante 75'	Report	Costa (yellow card) 14'; Venuti (yellow card) 42'	Stadium: Stadio Atleti Azzurri d'Italia; Attendance: 16,687; Referee: Fabrizio Pasqua

2 December 2017 15	Torino	1–1	Atalanta	Turin
20:45 CET (UTC+01:00)	Nkoulou 45'; Obi (yellow card) 49'; Baselli (yellow card) 78'	Report	Iličić 54'; Masiello (yellow card) 64'; Toloi (yellow card) 85'	Stadium: Stadio Olimpico Grande Torino; Attendance: 14,605; Referee: Paolo Tagliavento

12 December 2017 16	Genoa	1–2	Atalanta	Genoa
19:00 CET (UTC+01:00)	Bertolacci 4', (yellow card) 90+6'; Izzo (yellow card) 25'; Pandev (yellow card) 60'	Report	Masiello (yellow card) 11', (goal) 52'; Iličić 45'; De Roon (yellow card) 59'	Stadium: Stadio Luigi Ferraris; Attendance: 18,281; Referee: Daniele Doveri

17 December 2017 17	Atalanta	3–3	Lazio	Bergamo
20:45 CET (UTC+01:00)	Caldara 19'; Iličić 22', 50' (pen.); Freuler (yellow card) 63'; Hateboer (yellow card) 83'	Report	Milinković-Savić 27', 35'; Bastos (yellow card) 49'; Luis Alberto 79'; Wallace (yellow card) 80'	Stadium: Stadio Atleti Azzurri d'Italia; Attendance: 16,692; Referee: Massimiliano Irrati

23 December 2017 18	Milan	0–2	Atalanta	Milan
18:00 CET (UTC+01:00)	Cutrone (yellow card) 31'; Kessié (yellow card) 40'	Report	Cristante 32'; Iličić 71'	Stadium: San Siro; Attendance: 45,746; Referee: Michael Fabbri

30 December 2017 19	Atalanta	1–2	Cagliari	Bergamo
15:00 CET (UTC+01:00)	Gómez 90+2'	Report	Pavoletti 6'; Cigarini (yellow card) 21'; Padoin 23'; Andreolli (yellow card) 45'; Miangue (yellow card) 57' (yellow-red card) 90+5'; Ceppitelli (yellow card) 90+3'	Stadium: Stadio Atleti Azzurri d'Italia; Attendance: 17,755; Referee: Fabrizio Pasqua

6 January 2018 20	Roma	1–2	Atalanta	Rome
18:00 CET (UTC+01:00)	Džeko 56'; Fazio (yellow card) 90+3'	Report	Cornelius 14'; De Roon 19', (yellow card) 28' (yellow-red card) 45'; Caldara (yellow card) 30'	Stadium: Stadio Olimpico; Attendance: 32,863; Referee: Marco Guida

21 January 2018 21	Atalanta	0–1	Napoli	Bergamo
12:30 CET (UTC+01:00)		Report	Mário Rui (yellow card) 24'; Mertens 65'; Callejón (yellow card) 88'	Stadium: Stadio Atleti Azzurri d'Italia; Attendance: 19,098; Referee: Daniele Orsato

27 January 2018 22	Sassuolo	0–3	Atalanta	Reggio Emilia
18:00 CET (UTC+01:00)	Goldaniga (yellow card) 68' (yellow-red card) 90+7'	Report	Masiello 30'; Cristante 83'; Freuler 86'	Stadium: Mapei Stadium – Città del Tricolore; Attendance: 8,852; Referee: Paolo Valeri

4 February 2018 23	Atalanta	1–0	Chievo	Bergamo
15:00 CET (UTC+01:00)	Mancini 72'	Report	Bani (yellow card) 90+2'	Stadium: Stadio Atleti Azzurri d'Italia; Attendance: 17,292; Referee: Gianpaolo Calvarese

10 February 2018 24	Crotone	1–1	Atalanta	Crotone
18:00 CET (UTC+01:00)	Capuano (yellow card) 52'; Budimir (yellow card) 76'; Mandragora 79'; Faraoni (yellow card) 83'; Nalini (yellow card) 90+3'	Report	Palomino (yellow card) 35', (goal) 88'; Toloi (yellow card) 85'	Stadium: Stadio Ezio Scida; Attendance: 8,795; Referee: Davide Massa

18 February 2018 25	Atalanta	1–1	Fiorentina	Bergamo
18:00 CET (UTC+01:00)	Petagna 45+1', (yellow card) 79'; Mancini (yellow card) 70'	Report	Simeone (yellow card) 9'; Badelj 16', (yellow card) 31'; Benassi (yellow card) 48'; Milenković (yellow card) 83' (yellow-red card) 85'; Veretout (yellow card) 86'	Stadium: Stadio Atleti Azzurri d'Italia; Attendance: 17,261; Referee: Fabio Maresca

11 March 2018 28	Bologna	0–1	Atalanta	Bologna
15:00 CET (UTC+01:00)	Avenatti (yellow card) 4'; Romagnoli (yellow card) 45+2'; Pulgar (yellow card) 58'	Report	De Roon 83'	Stadium: Stadio Renato Dall'Ara; Attendance: 17,917; Referee: Gianpaolo Calvarese

14 March 2018 26	Juventus	2–0	Atalanta	Turin
18:00 CET (UTC+01:00)	Higuaín 29'; Alex Sandro (yellow card) 72'; Matuidi 81'; Benatia (yellow card) 82'; Asamoah (yellow card) 90+1'	Report	Hateboer (yellow card) 47'; Cristante (yellow card) 61'; Mancini (yellow card) 78' (yellow-red card) 79'; De Roon (yellow card) 82'	Stadium: Allianz Stadium; Attendance: 36,753; Referee: Maurizio Mariani
Note: Postponed due to inclement weather; originally scheduled for 25 February 2018.

18 March 2018 29	Hellas Verona	0–5	Atalanta	Verona
15:00 CET (UTC+01:00)	Calvano (yellow card) 21'; Ferrari (yellow card) 43'; Valoti (yellow card) 62'	Report	Cristante 2', (yellow card) 33'; Iličić (yellow card) 27', (goal) 45+4' (pen.), 48', 69'; Gómez 71'	Stadium: Stadio Marc'Antonio Bentegodi; Attendance: 14,919; Referee: Marco Di Bello

31 March 2018 30	Atalanta	2–0	Udinese	Bergamo
15:00 CEST (UTC+02:00)	Petagna 68', (yellow card) 68'; Masiello 74'	Report	Nuytinck (yellow card) 42'; De Paul (yellow card) 57'	Stadium: Stadio Atleti Azzurri d'Italia; Attendance: 17,204; Referee: Luca Pairetto

3 April 2018 27	Atalanta	1–2	Sampdoria	Bergamo
18:30 CET (UTC+01:00)	Toloi 67'; Petagna (yellow card) 79'; Gómez (yellow card) 82'	Report	Caprari 43'; Praet (yellow card) 83'; Zapata 84', (yellow card) 90'; Ramírez (yellow card) 90+2'	Stadium: Stadio Atleti Azzurri d'Italia; Attendance: 17,612; Referee: Fabrizio Pasqua
Note: Postponed due to Fiorentina player Davide Astori's death; originally scheduled for 4 March 2018.

7 April 2018 31	SPAL	1–1	Atalanta	Ferrara
18:00 CEST (UTC+02:00)	Cionek (yellow card) 30', (goal) 39'; Lazzari (yellow card) 54'; Kurtić (yellow card) 79'	Report	Petagna (yellow card) 42'; Freuler (yellow card) 75'; De Roon 78' (pen.)	Stadium: Stadio Paolo Mazza; Attendance: 12,906; Referee: Antonio Damato

14 April 2018 32	Atalanta	0–0	Internazionale	Bergamo
20:45 CEST (UTC+02:00)	Toloi (yellow card) 37'; Caldara (yellow card) 62'; Masiello (yellow card) 82'; Mancini (yellow card) 90+1'	Report	Miranda (yellow card) 32'; Valero (yellow card) 55'	Stadium: Stadio Atleti Azzurri d'Italia; Attendance: 20,076; Referee: Daniele Doveri

18 April 2018 33	Benevento	0–3	Atalanta	Benevento
18:00 CEST (UTC+02:00)	Toșca (yellow card) 64'; Brignola (yellow card) 71'	Report	Freuler 21'; Petagna (yellow card) 31'; Mancini (yellow card) 39'; Barrow 49'; Gómez 67'	Stadium: Stadio Ciro Vigorito; Attendance: 10,013; Referee: Davide Ghersini

22 April 2018 34	Atalanta	2–1	Torino	Bergamo
15:00 CEST (UTC+02:00)	Caldara (yellow card) 50'; Freuler 53'; De Roon (yellow card) 55'; Gosens 64'	Report	Ljajić 56'; Ansaldi (yellow card) 83'; Moretti (yellow card) 90+2'	Stadium: Stadio Atleti Azzurri d'Italia; Attendance: 18,856; Referee: Gianluca Aureliano

29 April 2018 35	Atalanta	3–1	Genoa	Bergamo
15:00 CEST (UTC+02:00)	Barrow 16'; Cristante 22'; Castagne (yellow card) 42'; Freuler (yellow card) 71'; Iličić 74'; Caldara (yellow card) 80'	Report	Rossettini (yellow card) 9'; Veloso 81'	Stadium: Stadio Atleti Azzurri d'Italia; Attendance: 18,543; Referee: Michael Fabbri

6 May 2018 36	Lazio	1–1	Atalanta	Rome
15:00 CEST (UTC+02:00)	Luiz Felipe (yellow card) 21'; Caicedo 24'; Murgia (yellow card) 68'; Milinković-Savić (yellow card) 74'	Report	Barrow 2'; Masiello (yellow card) 48'; Toloi (yellow card) 90'	Stadium: Stadio Olimpico; Attendance: 45,000; Referee: Luca Banti

13 May 2018 37	Atalanta	1–1	Milan	Bergamo
18:00 CEST (UTC+02:00)	Masiello (yellow card) 13', (goal) 90+2'; De Roon (yellow card) 28'; Toloi (yellow card) 64' (red card) 65'; Gosens (yellow card) 73'; Iličić (yellow card) 86'	Report	Abate (yellow card) 17'; Kalinić (yellow card) 32'; Kessié 60'; Çalhanoğlu (yellow card) 66'; Romagnoli (yellow card) 69'; Montolivo (red card) 75'; Borini (yellow card) 87'; Donnarumma (yellow card) 90'	Stadium: Stadio Atleti Azzurri d'Italia; Attendance: 19,833; Referee: Marco Guida

20 May 2018 38	Cagliari	1–0	Atalanta	Cagliari
18:00 CEST (UTC+02:00)	Barella (yellow card) 50'; Ceppitelli 87'; Cigarini (yellow card) 90+3'; Pisacane (yellow card) 90+3'	Report	Castagne (yellow card) 46'	Stadium: Sardegna Arena; Attendance: 16,233; Referee: Davide Massa

=== Coppa Italia ===
20 December 2017 Round of 16	Atalanta	2–1	Sassuolo	Bergamo
15:00 CET (UTC+01:00)	Cornelius 16'; Toloi 33'; Kurtić (yellow card) 61' (red card) 89'	Report	Cassata (yellow card) 25'; Rogério (yellow card) 73'; Toloi 74' (o.g.)	Stadium: Stadio Atleti Azzurri d'Italia; Attendance: 3,867; Referee: Davide Ghersini

2 January 2018 Quarter-finals	Napoli	1–2	Atalanta	Naples
20:45 CET (UTC+01:00)	Koulibaly (yellow card) 21'; Rog (yellow card) 27'; Mertens 84'	Report	Freuler (yellow card) 19'; Caldara (yellow card) 41'; Toloi (yellow card) 44'; Castagne 50'; Gómez 81'	Stadium: Stadio San Paolo; Attendance: 27,174; Referee: Piero Giacomelli

31 January 2018 Semi-finals; First leg	Atalanta	0–1	Juventus	Bergamo
20:45 CET (UTC+01:00)	Toloi (yellow card) 76'; Masiello (yellow card) 81'	Report	Higuaín 3'; Chiellini (yellow card) 50'; Bentancur (yellow card) 90+4'	Stadium: Stadio Atleti Azzurri d'Italia; Attendance: 16,406; Referee: Paolo Valeri

28 February 2018 Semi-finals; Second leg	Juventus	1–0 (2–0 agg.)	Atalanta	Turin
17:30 CET (UTC+01:00)	Chiellini (yellow card) 13'; Pjanić (yellow card) 45+1', (goal) 75' (pen.); Matuidi (yellow card) 50'; Alex Sandro (yellow card) 78'; Mandžukić (yellow card) 87'	Report	Gómez (yellow card) 35'; Masiello (yellow card) 69'	Stadium: Allianz Stadium; Attendance: 38,417; Referee: Michael Fabbri

=== UEFA Europa League ===
==== Group stage ====
Pos	Team	Pld	W	D	L	GF	GA	GD	Pts	Qualification	ATA	LYO	EVE	APL
1	(Italy) Atalanta	6	4	2	0	14	4	+10	14	Advance to knockout phase	—	1–0	3–0	3–1
2	(France) Lyon	6	3	2	1	11	4	+7	11	Advance to knockout phase	1–1	—	3–0	4–0
3	(England) Everton	6	1	1	4	7	15	−8	4		1–5	1–2	—	2–2
4	(Cyprus) Apollon Limassol	6	0	3	3	5	14	−9	3		1–1	1–1	0–3	—

Source: UEFA
Rules for classification: Group stage tiebreakers

14 September 2017 1	Atalanta (Italy)	3–0	(England) Everton	Reggio Emilia, Italy
21:05 CEST (UTC+02:00)	Masiello 27', (yellow card) 33'; Gómez 41'; Cristante 44'	Report	Sigurðsson (yellow card) 63'	Stadium: Mapei Stadium – Città del Tricolore; Attendance: 14,890; Referee: Vladislav Bezborodov (Russia)

28 September 2017 2	Lyon (France)	1–1	(Italy) Atalanta	Décines-Charpieu, France
19:00 CEST (UTC+02:00)	Traoré 45'; Tete (yellow card) 56'	Report	Cristante (yellow card) 27'; De Roon (yellow card) 38'; Gómez 57'; Iličić (yellow card) 71'	Stadium: Parc Olympique Lyonnais; Attendance: 27,715; Referee: Daniel Siebert (Germany)

19 October 2017 3	Atalanta (Italy)	3–1	(Cyprus) Apollon Limassol	Reggio Emilia, Italy
19:00 CEST (UTC+02:00)	Iličić 12'; Gómez (yellow card) 48'; Petagna 64', (yellow card) 65'; Freuler 66'; Masiello (yellow card) 71'; Caldara (yellow card) 77'	Report	Sachetti (yellow card) 51'; Allan (yellow card) 53'; Schembri 59'	Stadium: Mapei Stadium – Città del Tricolore; Attendance: 13,803; Referee: Georgi Kabakov (Bulgaria)

2 November 2017 4	Apollon Limassol (Cyprus)	1–1	(Italy) Atalanta	Nicosia, Cyprus
21:05 CET (UTC+01:00)	Vasiliou (yellow card) 35'; Sachetti (yellow card) 39'; Alex (yellow card) 71'; Zelaya 90+4'	Report	Iličić 35' (pen.), (yellow card) 47'; Hateboer (yellow card) 71'; Berisha (yellow card) 90+2'	Stadium: GSP Stadium; Attendance: 5,658; Referee: Andris Treimanis (Latvia)

23 November 2017 5	Everton (England)	1–5	(Italy) Atalanta	Liverpool, England
19:00 CET (UTC+01:00)	Williams (yellow card) 43'; Martina (yellow card) 67'; Sandro 71'; Davies (yellow card) 76'; Calvert-Lewin (yellow card) 90+3'	Report	Cristante 12', 64'; Gosens 86'; Cornelius 88', 90+4'	Stadium: Goodison Park; Attendance: 17,431; Referee: Jakob Kehlet (Denmark)

7 December 2017 6	Atalanta (Italy)	1–0	(France) Lyon	Reggio Emilia, Italy
21:05 CET (UTC+01:00)	Petagna 10'; Freuler (yellow card) 33'; Toloi (yellow card) 55'	Report		Stadium: Mapei Stadium – Città del Tricolore; Attendance: 14,500; Referee: Aleksei Eskov (Russia)

==== Knockout phase ====
===== Round of 32 =====
15 February 2018 First leg	Borussia Dortmund (Germany)	3–2	(Italy) Atalanta	Dortmund, Germany
19:00 CET (UTC+01:00)	Weigl (yellow card) 24'; Schürrle 30', (yellow card) 58'; Piszczek (yellow card) 34'; Batshuayi 65', 90+1', (yellow card) 83'	Report	Cristante (yellow card) 26'; Iličić 51', 56'; Hateboer (yellow card) 58'	Stadium: Signal Iduna Park; Attendance: 62,500; Referee: Daniel Stefański (Poland)

22 February 2018 Second leg	Atalanta (Italy)	1–1 (3–4 agg.)	(Germany) Borussia Dortmund	Reggio Emilia, Italy
21:05 CET (UTC+01:00)	Toloi 11'; Hateboer (yellow card) 66'; Spinazzola (yellow card) 79'	Report	Papastathopoulos (yellow card) 17'; Schmelzer 83'; Götze (yellow card) 87'; Bürki (yellow card) 89'	Stadium: Mapei Stadium – Città del Tricolore; Attendance: 17,492; Referee: Jesús Gil Manzano (Spain)

== Statistics ==
=== Appearances and goals ===
No.	Pos	Nat	Player	Total		Serie A		Coppa Italia		Europa League	
No.	Pos	Nat	Player	Apps	Goals	Apps	Goals	Apps	Goals	Apps	Goals
Goalkeepers
1	GK	(Albania) ALB	Etrit Berisha	41	0	31	0	2	0	8	0
31	GK	(Italy) ITA	Franceso Rossi	1	0	0+1	0	0	0	0	0
91	GK	(Italy) ITA	Pierluigi Gollini	8	0	7	0	1	0	0	0
Defenders
3	DF	(Brazil) BRA	Rafael Toloi	39	3	29+2	1	3	1	5	1
5	DF	(Italy) ITA	Andrea Masiello	40	5	30+1	4	1	0	8	1
6	DF	(Argentina) ARG	José Luis Palomino	35	1	22+4	1	2	0	5+2	0
13	DF	(Italy) ITA	Mattia Caldara	33	3	24	3	1	0	6+2	0
21	DF	(Belgium) BEL	Timothy Castagne	26	1	17+3	0	3	1	2+1	0
28	DF	(Italy) ITA	Gianluca Mancini	12	1	8+3	1	1	0	0	0
33	DF	(Netherlands) NED	Hans Hateboer	42	0	26+7	0	1	0	8	0
37	DF	(Italy) ITA	Leonardo Spinazzola	24	0	17+1	0	0	0	6	0
95	DF	(Italy) ITA	Alessandro Bastoni	5	0	0+4	0	1	0	0	0
Midfielders
4	MF	(Italy) ITA	Bryan Cristante	46	12	33+3	9	2	0	8	3
8	MF	(Germany) GER	Robin Gosens	26	2	17+4	1	2	0	0+3	1
11	MF	(Switzerland) SUI	Remo Freuler	45	6	33+2	5	2	0	8	1
15	MF	(Netherlands) NED	Marten de Roon	45	3	29+5	3	3	0	5+3	0
19	MF	(Italy) ITA	Luca Rizzo	0	0	0	0	0	0	0	0
23	MF	(Italy) ITA	Filippo Melegoni	0	0	0	0	0	0	0	0
32	MF	(Switzerland) SUI	Nicolas Haas	11	0	1+8	0	1+1	0	0	0
72	MF	(Slovenia) SVN	Josip Iličić	40	15	21+10	11	0+3	0	5+1	4
88	MF	(Brazil) BRA	João Schmidt	1	0	0	0	0+1	0	0	0
Forwards
9	FW	(Denmark) DEN	Andreas Cornelius	30	6	8+15	3	3	1	0+4	2
10	FW	(Argentina) ARG	Alejandro Gómez	42	9	30+2	6	2+1	1	7	2
29	FW	(Italy) ITA	Andrea Petagna	38	6	21+7	4	0+2	0	6+2	2
99	FW	(The Gambia) GAM	Musa Barrow	13	3	5+7	3	0+1	0	0	0
Players transferred out during the season
7	FW	(Italy) ITA	Riccardo Orsolini	10	0	0+8	0	1	0	0+1	0
20	FW	(Italy) ITA	Luca Vido	4	0	0+4	0	0	0	0	0
27	MF	(Slovenia) SVN	Jasmin Kurtić	19	2	7+7	2	1	0	1+3	0

Last updated: 20 May 2018
Source: Competitions

=== Goalscorers ===
Rank	No.	Pos	Nat	Name	Serie A	Coppa Italia	UEFA EL	Total
1	72	MF	(Slovenia)	Josip Iličić	11	0	4	15
2	4	MF	(Italy)	Bryan Cristante	9	0	3	12
3	10	FW	(Argentina)	Alejandro Gómez	6	1	2	9
4	9	FW	(Denmark)	Andreas Cornelius	3	1	2	6
4	11	MF	(Switzerland)	Remo Freuler	5	0	1	6
4	29	FW	(Italy)	Andrea Petagna	4	0	2	6
7	5	DF	(Italy)	Andrea Masiello	4	0	1	5
8	3	DF	(Brazil)	Rafael Toloi	1	1	1	3
8	13	DF	(Italy)	Mattia Caldara	3	0	0	3
8	15	MF	(Netherlands)	Marten de Roon	3	0	0	3
8	99	FW	(The Gambia)	Musa Barrow	3	0	0	3
12	8	MF	(Germany)	Robin Gosens	1	0	1	2
12	27	MF	(Slovenia)	Jasmin Kurtić	2	0	0	2
14	6	DF	(Argentina)	José Luis Palomino	1	0	0	1
14	21	DF	(Belgium)	Timothy Castagne	0	1	0	1
14	28	DF	(Italy)	Gianluca Mancini	1	0	0	1
Own goal					0	0	0	0
Totals					57	4	17	78

Last updated: 20 May 2018

=== Clean sheets ===
Rank	No.	Pos	Nat	Name	Serie A	Coppa Italia	UEFA EL	Total
1	1	GK	(Albania)	Etrit Berisha	8	0	2	10
2	91	GK	(Italy)	Pierluigi Gollini	3	0	0	3
Totals					11	0	2	13

Last updated: 20 May 2018

=== Disciplinary record ===
No.	Pos	Nat	Name	Serie A			Coppa Italia			UEFA EL			Total		
No.	Pos	Nat	Name	Booked	(yellow card) (yellow-red card)	Sent off (straight red)	Booked	(yellow card) (yellow-red card)	Sent off (straight red)	Booked	(yellow card) (yellow-red card)	Sent off (straight red)	Booked	(yellow card) (yellow-red card)	Sent off (straight red)
1	GK	(Albania)	Etrit Berisha	0	0	0	0	0	0	1	0	0	1	0	0
31	GK	(Italy)	Francesco Rossi	0	0	0	0	0	0	0	0	0	0	0	0
91	GK	(Italy)	Pierluigi Gollini	0	0	0	0	0	0	0	0	0	0	0	0
3	DF	(Brazil)	Rafael Toloi	7	0	1	1	0	0	1	0	0	9	0	1
5	DF	(Italy)	Andrea Masiello	5	0	0	0	0	0	2	0	0	7	0	0
6	DF	(Argentina)	José Luis Palomino	3	0	0	0	0	0	0	0	0	3	0	0
13	DF	(Italy)	Mattia Caldara	5	0	0	1	0	0	1	0	0	7	0	0
21	DF	(Belgium)	Timothy Castagne	4	0	0	0	0	0	0	0	0	4	0	0
28	DF	(Italy)	Gianluca Mancini	4	1	0	0	0	0	0	0	0	4	1	0
33	DF	(Netherlands)	Hans Hateboer	3	0	0	0	0	0	3	0	0	6	0	0
37	DF	(Italy)	Leonardo Spinazzola	1	0	0	0	0	0	1	0	0	2	0	0
95	DF	(Italy)	Alessandro Bastoni	0	0	0	0	0	0	0	0	0	0	0	0
4	MF	(Italy)	Bryan Cristante	4	0	0	0	0	0	2	0	0	6	0	0
8	MF	(Germany)	Robin Gosens	1	0	0	0	0	0	0	0	0	1	0	0
11	MF	(Switzerland)	Remo Freuler	4	0	1	1	0	0	1	0	0	6	0	1
15	MF	(Netherlands)	Marten de Roon	8	1	0	0	0	0	1	0	0	9	1	0
23	MF	(Italy)	Filippo Melegoni	0	0	0	0	0	0	0	0	0	0	0	0
27	MF	(Slovenia)	Jasmin Kurtić	2	0	0	1	0	1	0	0	0	3	0	1
32	MF	(Switzerland)	Nicolas Haas	0	0	0	0	0	0	0	0	0	0	0	0
72	MF	(Slovenia)	Josip Iličić	3	0	0	0	0	0	2	0	0	5	0	0
88	MF	(Brazil)	João Schmidt	0	0	0	0	0	0	0	0	0	0	0	0
7	FW	(Italy)	Riccardo Orsolini	0	0	0	0	0	0	0	0	0	0	0	0
9	FW	(Denmark)	Andreas Cornelius	0	0	0	0	0	0	0	0	0	0	0	0
10	FW	(Argentina)	Alejandro Gómez	2	0	0	0	0	0	1	0	0	3	0	0
20	FW	(Italy)	Luca Vido	0	0	0	0	0	0	0	0	0	0	0	0
29	FW	(Italy)	Andrea Petagna	6	0	0	0	0	0	1	0	0	7	0	0
99	FW	(The Gambia)	Musa Barrow	0	0	0	0	0	0	0	0	0	0	0	0
Totals				62	2	2	4	0	1	17	0	0	83	2	3

Last updated: 20 May 2018
