= Stefano Mazzini =

Italian footballer

Personal information
- Date of birth: 6 December 1998 (age 27)
- Place of birth: Crema, Italy
- Height: 1.91 m (6 ft 3 in)
- Position: Goalkeeper

Team information
- Current team: Carrarese
- Number: 22

Youth career
- –2016: Atalanta

Senior career*
Years	Team	Apps	(Gls)
2016–2023	Atalanta	0	(0)
2017–2018	→ Gavorrano (loan)	1	(0)
2018	→ Pordenone (loan)	5	(0)
2018–2019	→ Carrarese (loan)	6	(0)
2019–2020	→ Pontedera (loan)	21	(0)
2020	→ Piacenza (loan)	5	(0)
2020–2022	→ Carrarese (loan)	30	(0)
2022–2023	→ Aquila Montevarchi (loan)	16	(0)
2023–	Carrarese	0	(0)
- * Club domestic league appearances and goals as of 23 April 2023

Stefano Mazzini (born 6 December 1998) is an Italian footballer who plays as a goalkeeper for Serie B club Carrarese.

== Club career ==
=== Atalanta ===
Born in Crema, Mazzini was a youth exponent of Atalanta. On 13 August 2016, he was called up to the senior squad's official game for the first time, in the third round of Coppa Italia against Cremonese and eight days later, on 21 August, for the first time in a Serie A match, against Lazio, but remained on the bench.

==== Loan to Gavorrano and Pordenone ====
On 13 July 2017, Mazzini was loaned to Serie C side Gavorrano on a season-long loan deal. Three months later, on 7 October, he made his professional debut in Serie C for Gavorrano in a 4–1 home defeat against Arzachena. However, in January 2018, his loan was interrupted and Mazzini returned to Atalanta leaving Gavorrano with only 1 appearance, remaining an unused substitute for 18 matches in the first part of the season.

On 25 January 2018, Mazzini was signed by Serie C club Pordenone on a 6-month loan deal. Three weeks later, on 14 February, he made his debut for Pordenone in Serie C in a 1–0 away defeat against Südtirol. On 18 March he kept his first clean sheet in a 2–0 home win over Fermana. Mazzini ended his 6-month loan to Pordenone with only 5 appearances, keeping 1 clean sheet and conceding 7 goals. At Pordenone he was the second keeper after Simone Perilli.

==== Loan to Carrarese ====
On 23 August 2018, Mazzini was signed by Serie C side Carrarese on a season-long loan deal. After seven months, on 24 February 2019, Mazzini made his debut for Carrarese and kept his first clean sheet for the club in a 1–0 home win over Pontedera. On 2 March he kept his second clean sheet in a 3–0 away win over Albissola and two weeks later, on 16 March, Mazzini kept his third clean sheet, but he was sent-off with a red card in the 68th minute of a 3–0 home win over Arezzo. Mazzini ended his season-long loan to Carrarese with 9 appearances (including 3 in the play-off), 5 goals conceded and 5 keeping clean sheets.

==== Loan to Pontedera and Piacenza ====
On 3 July 2019, Mazzini was loaned to Serie C club Pontedera on a season-long loan deal. On 24 August he made his debut for the club in a 3–1 home win over Carrarese. He became Pontedera's first-choice early in the season. On 15 September he kept his first clean sheet for Pontedera in a 0–0 home draw against Novara. Three weeks later, on 6 October, he kept his second clean sheet for the club in a 2–0 away win over Alessandria. In January 2020, Mazzini was re-called to Atalanta and he ended the loan to Pontedera with 21 appearances in the league and 3 clean sheets.

On 21 January 2020, he moved to Serie C club Piacenza on loan. Two days later, on 23 January, Mazzini made his debut for the club and he also his first clean sheet in a 0–0 home draw against Arzignano Valchiampo. On 9 February he kept his second clean sheet for Piacenza, a 1–0 away win over Ravenna. Mazzini ended his 6-month loan to Piacenza with only 5 appearances, 5 goals conceded and 2 clean sheets.

==== Loan to Carrarese ====
On 29 August 2020, Mazzini returned to Serie C side Carrarese on a season-long loan deal. On 23 September he made his seasonal debut for the club in a 4–0 home win over Ambrosiana in the first round of Coppa Italia. Four days later, on 27 September, he made his league debut and he kept the clean sheet in a 0–0 home draw against Pro Patria, and one week later he kept his second consecutive clean sheet in a 1–0 away win over Pro Sesto. Mazzini became Carrarese's first-choice goalkeeper early in the season. On 17 October he kept his third clean sheet in Serie C in a 0–0 away draw against Lecco. Mazzini ended his season-long loan to Carrarese with 31 appearances, 33 goals conceded and 10 clean sheets.

On 1 September 2021, he was loaned again to Carrarese.

==== Loan to Aquila Montevarchi ====
Mazzini joined Serie C club Aquila Montevarchi on a one-year loan on 15 July 2022.

== Career statistics ==
=== Club ===
As of match played 5 March 2023

Appearances and goals by club, season and competition
Club	Season	League			Cup		Other		Total	
Club	Season	League	Apps	Goals	Apps	Goals	Apps	Goals	Apps	Goals
Atalanta	2016–17	Serie A	0	0	0	0	—		0	0
Gavorrano (loan)	2017–18	Serie C	1	0	1	0	—		2	0
Pordenone (loan)	2017–18	Serie C	5	0	—		0	0	5	0
Carrarese (loan)	2018–19	Serie C	6	0	2	0	3 (Note: All appearance(s) in Serie C play-off.)	0	11	0
Pontedera (loan)	2019–20	Serie C	21	0	0	0	—		21	0
Piacenza (loan)	2019–20	Serie C	5	0	—		—		5	0
Carrarese (loan)	2020–21	Serie C	30	0	1	0	—		31	0
Carrarese (loan)	2021–22	Serie C	6	0	—		0	0	6	0
Carrarese (loan)	Total		36	0	1	0	0	0	37	0
Aquila Montevarchi (loan)	2022–23	Serie C	16	0	1	0	—		17	0
Carrarese	2023–24	Serie C	0	0	0	0	0	0	0	0
Carrarese	2024–25	Serie B	0	0	0	0	—		0	0
Carrarese	2025–26	Serie B	0	0	0	0	—		0	0
Carrarese	2026–27	Serie B	0	0	0	0	—		0	0
Carrarese	Total		0	0	0	0	0	0	0	0
Career total			90	0	5	0	3	0	98	0
