= Remo Freuler =

Swiss footballer (born 1992)

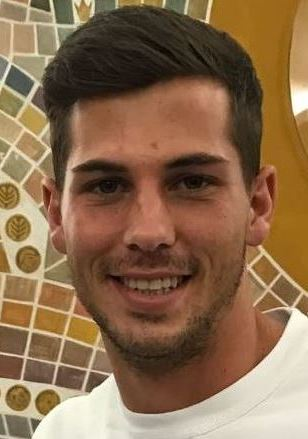
- Freuler in 2016

Personal information
- Full name: Remo Marco Freuler
- Date of birth: 15 April 1992 (age 34)
- Place of birth: Ennenda, Switzerland
- Height: 1.81 m (5 ft 11 in)
- Position: Defensive midfielder

Team information
- Current team: Olympiacos
- Number: 19

Youth career
- 2001–2005: Hinwil
- 2005–2010: Winterthur
- 2010–2011: Grasshoppers

Senior career*
Years	Team	Apps	(Gls)
2009–2010	Winterthur	2	(0)
2010–2011	Grasshoppers	12	(1)
2011–2014	Winterthur	70	(8)
2014–2016	Luzern	63	(9)
2016–2022	Atalanta	203	(18)
2022–2024	Nottingham Forest	28	(0)
2023–2024	→ Bologna (loan)	32	(1)
2024–2026	Bologna	66	(2)
2026–	Olympiacos	10	(0)

International career^{‡}
2010–2011	Switzerland U19	4	(2)
2013–2014	Switzerland U21	8	(1)
2017–	Switzerland	100	(12)
- * Club domestic league appearances and goals as of 20:28, 22 November 2026 (UTC) ‡ National team caps and goals as of 22:15, 16 November 2026 (UTC)

Remo Marco Freuler (Swiss Standard German pronunciation: [ˈreː.mo ˈfrɔɪ.lər]; born 15 April 1992) is a Swiss professional footballer who plays as a defensive midfielder for Super League Greece club Olympiacos and the Switzerland national team.

== Club career ==
Freuler began his youth career with FC Hinwil and moved to fellow Zürich side FC Winterthur in 2005. Freuler made his professional debut with Winterthur at the age of 18 in 2010, making two substitute appearances at the end of the 2009–10 Swiss Challenge League. That summer, Freuler was transferred to Grasshopper Club Zürich, where he spent most of the season with the under-21 side. He did spend a stint with the professional club toward the beginning of the Super League season, and got on the scoresheet against rivals FC Zürich. Freuler was frozen out of the team the following season, and was loaned back to Winterthur in the winter break.

=== Winterthur ===
Freuler joined a Winterthur side in tenth place in the Challenge League after the first half of the season, just two points above the relegation zone. He made 14 appearances that season for Winterthur, highlighted by his first career goals for the club in the form of a brace against Kriens on 4 March 2012, and Winterthur finished in fourth place. Freuler started all but two games in the 2012–13 season as Winterthur finished in third. Freuler's contract with Winterthur was made permanent in the summer, and he made 21 more appearances with the club the next season before moving to Super League side FC Luzern.

=== Luzern ===
On 18 February 2014, Freuler was transferred to Luzern, and he made his club debut on 2 March against St. Gallen under manager Carlos Bernegger. Freuler scored his first goal for the club against Young Boys on 6 April, and Luzern finished the 2013–14 season in fourth place.

Freuler scored seven goals and provided five assists the following season for Luzern, who made a resurgence under new manager Markus Babbel following a mid-season sacking of Bernegger and finishing the first half of the season bottom of the table. Freuler started every game of the new season under Babbel before being transferred to Italian club Atalanta B.C.

=== Atalanta ===
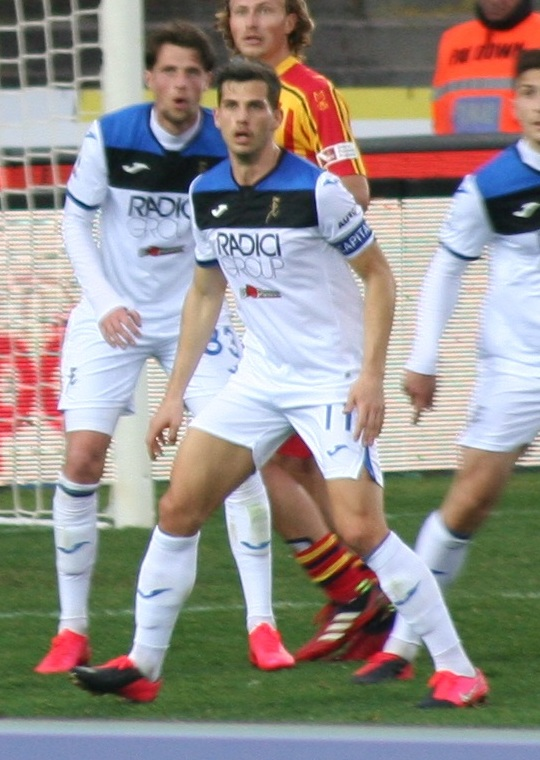
Freuler captaining Atalanta in 2020

On 19 January 2016, Freuler moved to Atalanta for a €2 million transfer fee, and he made his Serie A debut on 7 February against Empoli. After being substituted off against Sampdoria the next week, Freuler was an unused substitute by manager Edy Reja the next seven matches until making his return to the starting eleven two months later against Roma. After the match, an Italian journalist gave him the nickname Iceman, which Freuler said was "because I was so calm on the ball". He scored his first goal for the Bergamo side on 2 May against eventual runners-up Napoli.

Freuler made 29 starts in the 2016–17 season, in which Atalanta finished fourth in the table, a nine place improvement under first-year manager Gian Piero Gasperini. Atalanta also qualified for the group stages of the Europa League for the first time since 1990. Freuler found his name on the scoresheet five times, and also provided four assists. On 28 April, Freuler scored a late equaliser at home to eventual champions Juventus, derailing their chance to clinch the Scudetto that weekend.

Freuler made his first Europa League group stage appearance against English side Everton, playing the full 90 minutes in a 3–0 victory over the Toffees. He had previously played in a second round qualification two-legged tie against Scottish club St Johnstone for Luzern. He opened his scoring account in the 2017–18 season with Atalanta against Fiorentina, scoring an equaliser in the fourth minute of stoppage time on 24 September 2017.

=== Nottingham Forest ===
On 14 August 2022, Freuler joined newly-promoted Premier League club Nottingham Forest, leaving Atalanta after six and a half seasons.

=== Bologna ===
On 1 September 2023, Freuler returned to Italy and joined Serie A club Bologna on loan with a conditional obligation to buy, as part of a swap deal that saw Nicolás Domínguez join Premier League side Nottingham Forest.

=== Olympiacos ===
On 17 August 2026, Freuler signed for Greek side Olympiacos on a free transfer.

== International career ==
Freuler came through the youth setup in Switzerland before being called up to the senior squad for the first time during Switzerland's 2018 FIFA World Cup qualifying campaign in November 2016. He made his debut for the Nati as an 84th-minute substitute for Haris Seferovic in a 1–0 win over Latvia on 25 March 2017.

He was included in Switzerland's 23-man squad for the 2018 FIFA World Cup in Russia, where he was an unused substitute in all four matches as the Swiss reached the round of 16.

On 26 March 2019, Freuler scored his first goal for Switzerland in a 3–3 draw with Denmark during UEFA Euro 2020 qualifying.

In May 2019, he played in the 2019 UEFA Nations League Finals, where his team finished fourth.

Freuler was named in the 26-man Swiss squad for the postponed UEFA Euro 2020, where he started all five matches for the Nati. On 2 July 2021, in the quarter-final against Spain, he contributed the assist for Xherdan Shaqiri's equalizing goal, but was later sent off in the 77th minute following a decision many pundits thought was too harsh. The match ended 1–1 and went to a penalty shoot-out, in which Spain progressed to the semi-finals.

Freuler was named in Switzerland's squad for the 2022 FIFA World Cup, making his 50th appearance for the national team and first at a World Cup finals in the team's opening match against Cameroon on 24 November 2022. In the team's final Group G match, he scored the winning goal of a 3–2 win against Serbia to qualify the Nati for the knockout stage.

On 7 June 2024, Freuler was named in the Swiss squad for UEFA Euro 2024 in Germany. He started the team's opening match against Hungary, assisting Michel Aebischer's goal in the 3–1 win. In the round 16 match against Italy, he scored his first goal in the European competition in a 2–0 victory, contributing to his country's first win over their opponent since 1993.

On 20 May 2026, Freuler was selected in the 26-man squad for the 2026 FIFA World Cup.

== Style of play ==
Freuler mainly plays as a central midfielder for club and country. He is considered an effective and versatile player who recovers the ball, tackles well and has a good range of passing. Il Giorno correspondent Fabrizio Carcano described him as "the conductor of the orchestra" due to his high footballing intelligence.

== Personal life ==
Freuler is of German descent through his mother, who is from Bavaria. He is distantly related to the Swiss cyclist Urs Freuler.

== Career statistics ==
=== Club ===
As of match played 23 May 2026

Appearances and goals by club, season and competition
Club	Season	League			National cup (Note: Includes Swiss Cup, Coppa Italia)		League cup (Note: Includes EFL Cup)		Europe		Total	
Club	Season	Division	Apps	Goals	Apps	Goals	Apps	Goals	Apps	Goals	Apps	Goals
Winterthur U21	2008–09	Swiss 1. Liga	1	0	—		—		—		1	0
Winterthur U21	2009–10	Swiss 1. Liga	9	2	—		—		—		9	2
Winterthur U21	Total		10	2	—		—		—		10	2
Winterthur	2009–10	Swiss Challenge League	2	0	0	0	—		—		2	0
Grasshoppers U21	2010–11	Swiss 1. Liga	19	7	—		—		—		19	7
Grasshoppers U21	2011–12	Swiss 1. Liga	5	1	—		—		—		5	1
Grasshoppers U21	Total		24	8	—		—		—		24	8
Grasshoppers	2010–11	Swiss Super League	5	1	2	1	—		0	0	7	2
Grasshoppers	2011–12	Swiss Super League	7	0	2	1	—		—		9	1
Grasshoppers	Total		12	1	4	2	—		0	0	16	3
Winterthur	2011–12	Swiss Challenge League	14	2	1	0	—		—		15	2
Winterthur	2012–13	Swiss Challenge League	35	3	2	1	—		—		37	4
Winterthur	2013–14	Swiss Challenge League	21	3	1	0	—		—		22	3
Winterthur	Total		72	8	4	1	—		—		76	9
Winterthur U21	2013–14	Swiss 1. Liga	1	1	—		—		—		1	1
Luzern	2013–14	Swiss Super League	12	1	1	0	—		—		13	1
Luzern	2014–15	Swiss Super League	33	7	3	0	—		2 (Note: Appearances in UEFA Europa League)	0	38	7
Luzern	2015–16	Swiss Super League	18	1	4	0	—		—		22	1
Luzern	Total		63	9	8	0	—		2	0	73	9
Atalanta	2015–16	Serie A	6	1	0	0	—		—		6	1
Atalanta	2016–17	Serie A	33	5	2	0	—		—		35	5
Atalanta	2017–18	Serie A	35	5	3	0	—		8	1	46	6
Atalanta	2018–19	Serie A	35	2	4	0	—		5	0	44	2
Atalanta	2019–20	Serie A	31	2	1	0	—		8 (Note: Appearances in UEFA Champions League)	1	40	3
Atalanta	2020–21	Serie A	34	2	5	0	—		7	0	46	2
Atalanta	2021–22	Serie A	29	1	2	0	—		12 (Note: Six appearances and one goal in UEFA Champions League, six appearances in UEFA Europa League)	1	43	2
Atalanta	Total		203	18	17	0	—		40	3	260	21
Nottingham Forest	2022–23	Premier League	28	0	0	0	5	0	—		33	0
Bologna (loan)	2023–24	Serie A	32	1	2	0	—		—		34	1
Bologna	2024–25	Serie A	37	1	5	0	—		7	0	49	1
Bologna	2025–26	Serie A	29	1	1	0	—		10	0	40	1
Bologna	Total		98	3	8	0	—		17	0	123	3
Career total			511	50	41	3	5	0	59	3	616	56

=== International ===
As of match played 16 November 2026

Appearances and goals by national team and year
National team	Year	Apps	Goals
Switzerland	2017	7	0
Switzerland	2018	7	0
Switzerland	2019	7	1
Switzerland	2020	4	2
Switzerland	2021	15	1
Switzerland	2022	13	2
Switzerland	2023	10	3
Switzerland	2024	15	2
Switzerland	2025	6	0
Switzerland	2026	16	1
Total		100	12

Scores and results list Switzerland's goal tally first, score column indicates score after each Freuler goal.

List of international goals scored by Remo Freuler
No.	Date	Venue	Opponent	Score	Result	Competition
1	26 March 2019	St. Jakob-Park, Basel, Switzerland	Denmark	1–0	3–3	UEFA Euro 2020 qualifying
2	13 October 2020	RheinEnergieStadion, Cologne, Germany	Germany	2–0	3–3	2020–21 UEFA Nations League A
3	14 November 2020	St. Jakob-Park, Basel, Switzerland	Spain	1–0	1–1	2020–21 UEFA Nations League A
4	15 November 2021	Swissporarena, Lucerne, Switzerland	Bulgaria	4–0	4–0	2022 FIFA World Cup qualification
5	27 September 2022	Kybunpark, St. Gallen, Switzerland	Czech Republic	1–0	2–1	2022–23 UEFA Nations League A
6	2 December 2022	Stadium 974, Doha, Qatar	Serbia	3–2	3–2	2022 FIFA World Cup
7	16 June 2023	Estadi Nacional, Andorra la Vella, Andorra	Andorra	1–0	2–1	UEFA Euro 2024 qualifying
8	9 September 2023	Fadil Vokrri Stadium, Pristina, Kosovo	Kosovo	1–0	2–2	UEFA Euro 2024 qualifying
9	9 September 2023	Fadil Vokrri Stadium, Pristina, Kosovo	Kosovo	2–1	2–2	UEFA Euro 2024 qualifying
10	29 June 2024	Olympiastadion, Berlin, Germany	Italy	1–0	2–0	UEFA Euro 2024
11	15 October 2024	Kybunpark, St. Gallen, Switzerland	Denmark	1–0	2–2	2024–25 UEFA Nations League A
12	26 September 2026	Toše Proeski Arena, Skopje, North Macedonia	North Macedonia	1–0	3–0	2026–27 UEFA Nations League B

== Honours ==
Bologna

- Coppa Italia: 2024–25

== See also ==
- List of men's footballers with 100 or more international caps
