= 2016–17 Atalanta BC season =

Atalanta
2016–17 season
- President: Antonio Percassi
- Manager: Gian Piero Gasperini
- Stadium: Stadio Atleti Azzurri d'Italia
- Serie A: 4th
- Coppa Italia: Round of 16
- Top goalscorer: League: Papu Gómez (16); All: Papu Gómez (16)
- Highest home attendance: 19,656 vs Milan (13 May 2017, Serie A)
- Lowest home attendance: 4,143 vs Cremonese (13 August 2016, Coppa Italia)
- Average home league attendance: 16,948
Home colours	Away colours	Third colours

The 2016–17 season was Atalanta Bergamasca Calcio's sixth consecutive season in Serie A.

The club enjoyed a season more successful than any previous one, finishing 4th in Serie A with 72 points, winning 21 games, although they were eliminated in the Coppa Italia in the round of 16.

The season was notable for the emergence of a group of talented young players brought into the fold by coach Gian Piero Gasperini, including Italian defenders Mattia Caldara and Andrea Conti, who, in addition to providing excellent defensive displays, also scored a remarkable 15 league goals between them; Italian midfielder Roberto Gagliardini, whose early season performances led to a transfer to Inter on loan in January; and Ivorian midfielder Franck Kessié, who would transfer to Milan soon after the end of the season on a two-year loan. Lastly, Argentine winger Papu Gómez enjoyed an excellent campaign as Atalanta's main attacking threat, finishing with 16 goals.

== Players ==
=== Squad information ===
Players and squad numbers last updated on 25 March 2017.
Note: Flags indicate national team as has been defined under FIFA eligibility rules. Players may hold more than one non-FIFA nationality.

No.	Name	Nat	Position(s)	Date of birth (age)	Signed in	Contract until	Signed from	Notes
Goalkeepers
1	Etrit Berisha	(Albania)	GK	10 March 1989 (aged 28)	2016	2017	(Italy) Lazio	
31	Francesco Rossi	(Italy)	GK	27 April 1991 (aged 26)	2009	2018	Youth academy	
47	Stefano Mazzini	(Italy)	GK	6 December 1998 (aged 18)	2016		Youth academy	
91	Pierluigi Gollini	(Italy)	GK	18 March 1995 (aged 22)	2017	2018	(England) Aston Villa	
Defenders
3	Rafael Toloi	(Brazil)	CB	10 October 1990 (aged 26)	2015	2018	(Brazil) São Paulo	
5	Andrea Masiello	(Italy)	CB / RB	5 February 1986 (aged 31)	2011	2018	(Italy) Bari	
6	Ervin Zukanović	(Bosnia and Herzegovina)	CB / LB	11 January 1987 (aged 30)	2016	2017	(Italy) Roma	
13	Mattia Caldara	(Italy)	CB	5 May 1994 (aged 23)	2017	2018	(Italy) Juventus	
24	Andrea Conti	(Italy)	RB	2 March 1994 (aged 23)	2013	2021	Youth academy	
25	Abdoulay Konko	(France)	RB	9 March 1984 (aged 33)	2016	2017	Unattached	
33	Hans Hateboer	(Netherlands)	RB	9 January 1994 (aged 23)	2017	2020	(Netherlands) Groningen	
37	Leonardo Spinazzola	(Italy)	LWB / LB / LM	25 March 1993 (aged 24)	2016	2018	(Italy) Juventus	
93	Boukary Dramé	(Senegal)	LB	22 July 1985 (aged 31)	2014	2018	(Italy) Chievo	
95	Alessandro Bastoni	(Italy)	CB	13 April 1999 (aged 18)	2017		Youth academy	
Midfielders
4	Bryan Cristante	(Italy)	CM	3 March 1995 (aged 22)	2017	2017	(Portugal) Benfica	
7	Marco D'Alessandro	(Italy)	RW	17 February 1991 (aged 26)	2014	2019	(Italy) Roma	
8	Giulio Migliaccio	(Italy)	DM	23 June 1981 (aged 36)	2013	2017	(Italy) Palermo	
11	Remo Freuler	(Switzerland)	CM	15 April 1992 (aged 25)	2016	2019	(Switzerland) Luzern	
19	Franck Kessié	(Ivory Coast)	DM	19 December 1996 (aged 20)	2015	2021	(Ivory Coast) Stella Club	
27	Jasmin Kurtić	(Slovenia)	AM	10 January 1989 (aged 28)	2015	2019	(Italy) Sassuolo	
52	Bryan Cabezas	(Ecuador)	LW	20 March 1997 (aged 20)	2016	2021	(Ecuador) Independiente del Valle	
77	Cristian Raimondi	(Italy)	RM	30 April 1981 (aged 36)	2010	2017	(Italy) Livorno	Club Captain
87	Anthony Mounier	(France)	LW	27 September 1987 (aged 29)	2017	2017	(Italy) Bologna	
88	Alberto Grassi	(Italy)	CM	7 March 1995 (aged 22)	2016	2017	(Italy) Napoli	
92	Salvatore Molina	(Italy)	RW	1 January 1992 (aged 25)	2011	2018	Youth academy	
94	Filippo Melegoni	(Italy)	DM	18 February 1999 (aged 18)	2016	2019	Youth academy	
99	Emmanuel Latte Lath	(Ivory Coast)	RW	2 January 1999 (aged 18)	2016	2019	Youth academy	
Forwards
9	Aleksandar Pešić	(Serbia)	CF / ST	21 May 1992 (aged 25)	2016	2017	(France) Toulouse	
10	Alejandro Gómez	(Argentina)	LW / SS	15 February 1988 (aged 29)	2014	2020	(Ukraine) Metalist Kharkiv	
29	Andrea Petagna	(Italy)	CF / ST	30 June 1995 (aged 22)	2016	2020	(Italy) Milan	
43	Alberto Paloschi	(Italy)	CF / ST	4 January 1990 (aged 27)	2016	2021	(England) Swansea City	
98	Christian Capone	(Italy)	ST	28 April 1999 (aged 18)	2016		Youth academy	

== Transfers ==
=== In ===
Date	Pos.	Player	Age	Moving from	Fee	Notes	Source
17 June 2016	FW	(Italy) Alberto Paloschi	26	(Wales) Swansea City	Undisclosed		
8 August 2016	MF	(Ecuador) Bryan Cabezas	19	(Ecuador) Independiente del Valle	Undisclosed		
19 August 2016	DF	(France) Abdoulay Konko	32	Unattached	Free		

==== Loans in ====
Date	Pos.	Player	Age	Moving from	Fee	Notes	Source
21 July 2016	DF	(Bosnia and Herzegovina) Ervin Zukanović	29	(Italy) Roma	Loan		
30 August 2016	MF	(Italy) Alberto Grassi	21	(Italy) Napoli	Loan		
31 August 2016	GK	(Albania) Etrit Berisha	27	(Italy) Lazio	Loan		
31 August 2016	FW	(Serbia) Aleksandar Pešić	24	(France) Toulouse	Loan		

=== Out ===
Date	Pos.	Player	Age	Moving to	Fee	Notes	Source
4 July 2016	MF	(Netherlands) Marten de Roon	26	(England) Middlesbrough	€14M		
6 July 2016	MF	(Italy) Riccardo Cazzola	30	(Italy) Alessandria		Two-year contract	
20 July 2016	MF	(Italy) Luca Cigarini	30	(Italy) Sampdoria	Undisclosed		
31 August 2016	DF	(Italy) Davide Brivio	28	(Italy) Genoa			
31 August 2016	FW	(Italy) Matteo Ardemagni	29	(Italy) Avellino		Three-year contract	
12 January 2016	DF	(Italy) Mattia Caldara	22	(Italy) Juventus	€15M	Will remain on loan at Atalanta till June 2018	

==== Loans out ====
Date	Pos.	Player	Age	Moving to	Fee	Notes	Source
11 January 2017	MF	(Italy) Roberto Gagliardini	22	(Italy) Internazionale	€2M	€20M option to purchase in 2018	

== Pre-season and friendlies ==
13 July 2016 Friendly	Atalanta	7–1	Rappresentativa Val Seriana	Rovetta, Italy
	Gómez 29'; Paloschi 52'; D'Alessandro 52', 65'; Masiello 56'; Monachello 62'; Freuler 66'		Confalonieri 73'	Referee: Alessandro Tiraboschi

17 July 2016 Friendly	Atalanta	5–1	Brusaporto	Rovetta
	Kessié 6', 26'; Toloi 18'; D'Alessandro 28'; Raimondi 61'		Fogaroli 3'	Referee: Stefano Peletti

21 July 2016 Friendly	Atalanta	1–0	Giana Erminio	Clusone, Italy
	Paloschi 10'	Report

24 July 2016 Friendly	Atalanta	5–3	Lumezzane	Clusone
16:30	Paloschi 11', 70'; Magnani 33' (o.g.); Kessié 58'; Monachello 87'	Report	Barbuti 6'; Terracino 12'; Magnani 29'	Referee: Enrico Maggio

27 July 2016 Friendly	Atalanta (Italy)	6–0	(Switzerland) Chiasso	Clusone
16:30	Kurtic 31'; Dramé 33'; Gómez 41' (pen.); Petagna 44'; Monachello 65', 76'	Report		Referee: Riccardo Ros

30 July 2016 Friendly	Leeds United (England)	2–1	(Italy) Atalanta	Leeds, England
	Wood 25' (pen.); Roofe 68'	Report	D'Alessandro 31'	Stadium: Elland Road; Attendance: 11,832

4 August 2016 Friendly	Atalanta	3–0	Renate	Zingonia
--:-- CEST (UTC+02:00)	Dramé 4'; Migliaccio 26'; Petagna 38'	Report		Stadium: Centro Sportivo Bortolotti; Referee: Paride De Angeli

6 August 2016 Trofeo Bortolotti	Atalanta (Italy)	2–2 (3–4 p)	(Germany) Eintracht Frankfurt	Bergamo
20:30 CEST (UTC+02:00)	Gómez 14'; Toloi 85'	Report	Meier 27', 40'	Stadium: Stadio Atleti Azzurri d'Italia; Attendance: 9,834; Referee: Michael Fabbri
	Penalties
	Gómez (penalty scored); Petagna (penalty scored); Raimondi (penalty scored); Sportiello (penalty missed); Zukanović (penalty missed)		(penalty scored) Huszti; (penalty missed) Seferovic; (penalty scored) Blum; (penalty scored) Mascarell; (penalty scored) Hrgota

== Competitions ==
=== Overall ===
Competition	Started round	Current position	Final position	First match	Last match
Serie A	Matchday 1	—	4th	20 August 2016	28 May 2017
Coppa Italia	Third round	—	Round of 16	13 August 2016	11 January 2017

Last updated: 28 May 2017

=== Serie A ===
==== League table ====
Pos	Team	Pld	W	D	L	GF	GA	GD	Pts	Qualification or relegation
2	Roma	38	28	3	7	90	38	+52	87	Qualification for the Champions League group stage
3	Napoli	38	26	8	4	94	39	+55	86	Qualification for the Champions League play-off round
4	Atalanta	38	21	9	8	62	41	+21	72	Qualification for the Europa League group stage (Note: Since the winners of the 2016–17 Coppa Italia, Juventus, qualified for European competition based on league position, the spot awarded to the cup winners (Europa League group stage) was passed to the fifth-placed team and the spot awarded to the fifth-placed team (Europa League third qualifying round) was passed to the sixth-placed team.)
5	Lazio	38	21	7	10	74	51	+23	70	Qualification for the Europa League group stage
6	Milan	38	18	9	11	57	45	+12	63	Qualification for the Europa League third qualifying round

Source: Serie A, Soccerway
Rules for classification: 1) Points; 2) Head-to-head points; 3) Head-to-head goal difference; 4) Goal difference; 5) Goals scored; 6) Draw.

==== Results summary ====
Overall								Home						Away					
Pld	W	D	L	GF	GA	GD	Pts	W	D	L	GF	GA	GD	W	D	L	GF	GA	GD
38	21	9	8	62	41	+21	72	12	4	3	31	18	+13	9	5	5	31	23	+8

Last updated: 27 May 2017.
Source: Competitive matches

==== Results by round ====
Round	1	2	3	4	5	6	7	8	9	10	11	12	13	14	15	16	17	18	19	20	21	22	23	24	25	26	27	28	29	30	31	32	33	34	35	36	37	38
Ground	H	A	H	A	H	A	H	A	H	A	H	A	H	A	A	H	A	H	A	A	H	A	H	A	H	A	H	A	H	A	H	A	H	H	A	H	A	H
Result	L	L	W	L	L	W	W	D	W	W	W	W	W	W	L	L	D	W	W	L	W	D	W	W	W	W	D	L	W	W	D	D	W	D	D	D	W	W
Position	12	18	14	18	19	16	12	13	8	6	6	5	5	5	6	6	6	6	6	7	6	6	6	5	5	4	5	6	6	5	5	5	5	5	5	5	5	4

Updated to match(es) played on 28 May 2017. Source: Competitive matches
A = Away; H = Home; W = Win; D = Draw; L = Loss

==== Matches ====
21 August 2016 1	Atalanta	3–4	Lazio	Bergamo
20:45 CEST (UTC+02:00)	Conti (yellow card) 45+1'; Kessié 63', 67'; Raimondi (yellow card) 68'; Petagna 90+1'	Report	Immobile 15', (yellow card) 90+3'; Hoedt 20'; Lombardi 33'; Lukaku (yellow card) 62'; Cataldi 89'	Stadium: Stadio Atleti Azzurri d'Italia; Attendance: 14,710; Referee: Luca Banti

28 August 2016 2	Sampdoria	2–1	Atalanta	Genoa
20:45 CEST (UTC+02:00)	Quagliarella 35' (pen.); Barreto 45'; Pavlović (yellow card) 90+1'	Report	Carmona (yellow card) 21' (yellow-red card) 42'; Kessié 27', (yellow card) 40'; Raimondi (yellow card) 34'; Kurtić (yellow card) 62'; Gómez (yellow card) 85'	Stadium: Stadio Luigi Ferraris; Attendance: 19,045; Referee: Daniele Doveri

11 September 2016 3	Atalanta	2–1	Torino	Bergamo
15:00 CEST (UTC+02:00)	Pinilla (yellow card) 35'; Toloi (yellow card) 53'; Masiello 56'; Kessié 82' (pen.)	Report	Bovo (yellow card) 3'; Falque 54'; Acquah (yellow card) 90+4'	Stadium: Stadio Atleti Azzurri d'Italia; Attendance: 14,925; Referee: Maurizio Mariani

18 September 2016 4	Cagliari	3–0	Atalanta	Cagliari
15:00 CEST (UTC+02:00)	Borriello 8', 73'; Pisacane (yellow card) 35'; Sau 55'; Munari (yellow card) 88'	Report	Toloi (yellow card) 44'; Carmona (yellow card) 48'	Stadium: Stadio Sant'Elia; Attendance: 12,301; Referee: Michael Fabbri

21 September 2016 5	Atalanta	0–1	Palermo	Bergamo
20:45 CEST (UTC+02:00)	Kessié (yellow card) 70'; Toloi (yellow card) 79'; Masiello (yellow card) 90+3'	Report	Diamanti (yellow card) 70'; Cionek (yellow card) 87'; Nestorovski 89'	Stadium: Stadio Atleti Azzurri d'Italia; Attendance: 14,094; Referee: Davide Ghersini

26 September 2016 6	Crotone	1–3	Atalanta	Pescara
19:00 CEST (UTC+02:00)	Tonev (yellow card) 66'; Ceccherini (yellow card) 71'; Capezzi (yellow card) 81'; Simy 86'	Report	Petagna 3'; Masiello (yellow card) 36'; Kurtić 40'; Gómez 45+1'; Kessié (red card) 62'	Stadium: Stadio Adriatico – Giovanni Cornacchia; Attendance: 522; Referee: Gianluca Rocchi

2 October 2016 7	Atalanta	1–0	Napoli	Bergamo
15:00 CEST (UTC+02:00)	Petagna 9'; Conti (yellow card) 19'; Gagliardini (yellow card) 28'; Toloi (yellow card) 58'	Report	Koulibaly (yellow card) 71'; Milik (yellow card) 77'; Mertens (yellow card) 87'	Stadium: Stadio Atleti Azzurri d'Italia; Attendance: 15,732; Referee: Nicola Rizzoli

16 October 2016 8	Fiorentina	0–0	Atalanta	Florence
12:30 CEST (UTC+02:00)	Badelj (yellow card) 14'; Astori (yellow card) 67'; Vecino (yellow card) 71'	Report	Caldara (yellow card) 8'; Dramé (yellow card) 48'; Gagliardini (yellow card) 79'	Stadium: Stadio Artemio Franchi; Attendance: 27,529; Referee: Antonio Damato

23 October 2016 9	Atalanta	2–1	Internazionale	Bergamo
15:00 CEST (UTC+02:00)	Masiello 10'; Konko (yellow card) 49'; Pinilla 88' (pen.), (yellow card) 89'	Report	Éder 50', (yellow card) 61'	Stadium: Stadio Atleti Azzurri d'Italia; Attendance: 18,159; Referee: Daniele Doveri

26 October 2016 10	Pescara	0–1	Atalanta	Pescara
20:45 CEST (UTC+02:00)	Brugman (yellow card) 41'; Campagnaro (yellow card) 69'; Biraghi (yellow card) 75'	Report	Conti (yellow card) 19'; Konko (yellow card) 27'; Caldara 60'; Gagliardini (yellow card) 84'	Stadium: Stadio Adriatico – Giovanni Cornacchia; Attendance: 11,396; Referee: Marco Guida

30 October 2016 11	Atalanta	3–0	Genoa	Bergamo
12:30 CET (UTC+01:00)	Conti (yellow card) 6'; Kurtić 36', 45+2'; Gómez 84'	Report	Muñoz (yellow card) 1'; Laxalt (yellow card) 45'	Stadium: Stadio Atleti Azzurri d'Italia; Attendance: 16,245; Referee: Michael Fabbri

6 November 2016 12	Sassuolo	0–3	Atalanta	Reggio Emilia
15:00 CET (UTC+01:00)	Biondini (yellow card) 13'; Gazzola (yellow card) 45'; Peluso (yellow card) 70'; Ricci (yellow card) 79'	Report	Gómez 19'; Caldara 24'; Conti 43', (yellow card) 61'; Gagliardini (yellow card) 58'	Stadium: Mapei Stadium – Città del Tricolore; Attendance: 10,140; Referee: Fabio Maresca

20 November 2016 13	Atalanta	2–1	Roma	Bergamo
15:00 CET (UTC+01:00)	Toloi (yellow card) 40'; Caldara 62'; Kessié 90' (pen.)	Report	Perotti 40' (pen.); Strootman (yellow card) 53'; Džeko (yellow card) 90'	Stadium: Stadio Atleti Azzurri d'Italia; Attendance: 19,154; Referee: Gianluca Rocchi

27 November 2016 14	Bologna	0–2	Atalanta	Bologna
15:00 CET (UTC+01:00)	Gastaldello (yellow card) 36'; Viviani (yellow card) 61'; Maietta (yellow card) 74'; Masina (yellow card) 81'; Torosidis (yellow card) 89'	Report	Masiello 15'; Gagliardini (yellow card) 20'; Kessié (yellow card) 32'; Kurtić 68'	Stadium: Stadio Renato Dall'Ara; Attendance: 21,525; Referee: Maurizio Mariani

3 December 2016 15	Juventus	3–1	Atalanta	Turin
20:45 CET (UTC+01:00)	Alex Sandro 15'; Rugani 19', (yellow card) 35'; Lichtsteiner (yellow card) 31'; Mandžukić 64'; Sturaro (yellow card) 70'	Report	Freuler (yellow card) 26', (goal) 82'; Kessié (yellow card) 31'	Stadium: Juventus Stadium; Attendance: 41,209; Referee: Massimiliano Irrati

11 December 2016 16	Atalanta	1–3	Udinese	Bergamo
15:00 CET (UTC+01:00)	Kurtić 47'; Gómez (yellow card) 66'	Report	Danilo (yellow card) 23'; Zapata 45'; Fofana 72'; Perica (yellow card) 83'; Théréau 87'	Stadium: Stadio Atleti Azzurri d'Italia; Attendance: 16,180; Referee: Fabio Maresca

17 December 2016 17	Milan	0–0	Atalanta	Milan
18:00 CET (UTC+01:00)	Bonaventura (yellow card) 26'; Bertolacci (yellow card) 64'; Pašalić (yellow card) 74'	Report	Spinazzola (yellow card) 25'; Masiello (yellow card) 36'; Conti (yellow card) 74'; Petagna (yellow card) 86'; Gómez (yellow card) 90+1'; Sportiello (yellow card) 90+4'	Stadium: San Siro; Attendance: 35,584; Referee: Davide Massa

20 December 2016 18	Atalanta	2–1	Empoli	Bergamo
20:45 CET (UTC+01:00)	Kurtić (yellow card) 38'; Gómez (yellow card) 53'; Kessié 74'; D'Alessandro 90+4', (yellow card) 90+5'	Report	Büchel (yellow card) 17'; Marilungo (yellow card) 22'; Mchedlidze 51'; Dioussé (yellow card) 82'; Skorupski (yellow card) 90'	Stadium: Stadio Atleti Azzurri d'Italia; Attendance: 13,823; Referee: Michael Fabbri

8 January 2017 19	Chievo	1–4	Atalanta	Verona
15:00 CET (UTC+01:00)	Frey (yellow card) 29'; Pellissier 62'	Report	Gómez 4', 23'; Grassi (yellow card) 27'; Conti 42'; Freuler 69'	Stadium: Stadio Marc'Antonio Bentegodi; Attendance: 9,000; Referee: Federico La Penna

15 January 2017 20	Lazio	2–1	Atalanta	Rome
15:00 CET (UTC+01:00)	Immobile (yellow card) 21', (goal) 68' (pen.); Milinković-Savić 45+1', (yellow card) 88'; Parolo (yellow card) 43'; Lulić (yellow card) 59'; Biglia (yellow card) 87'	Report	Petagna 21'; Conti (yellow card) 55'; Grassi (yellow card) 90+3'	Stadium: Stadio Olimpico; Attendance: 11,500; Referee: Luca Pairetto

22 January 2017 21	Atalanta	1–0	Sampdoria	Bergamo
18:00 CET (UTC+01:00)	Gómez 55' (pen.); Kurtić (yellow card) 74'	Report	Pereira (yellow card) 29'; Đuričić (yellow card) 81'; Škriniar (yellow card) 89'	Stadium: Stadio Atleti Azzurri d'Italia; Attendance: 15,614; Referee: Nicola Rizzoli

29 January 2017 22	Torino	1–1	Atalanta	Turin
12:30 CET (UTC+01:00)	Falque 16'; Moretti (yellow card) 68'	Report	Freuler (yellow card) 2'; Caldara (yellow card) 62'; Petagna 66'	Stadium: Stadio Olimpico Grande Torino; Attendance: 15,565; Referee: Antonio Damato

5 February 2017 23	Atalanta	2–0	Cagliari	Bergamo
15:00 CET (UTC+01:00)	Gómez 4', 16'; Masiello (yellow card) 58'; Conti (yellow card) 63'; Kurtić (yellow card) 83'; Spinazzola (yellow card) 88'	Report	Ceppitelli (yellow card) 54'; Barella (yellow card) 61'	Stadium: Stadio Atleti Azzurri d'Italia; Attendance: 14,782; Referee: Claudio Gavillucci

12 February 2017 24	Palermo	1–3	Atalanta	Palermo
15:00 CET (UTC+01:00)	Rispoli (yellow card) 11'; González (yellow card) 23'; Chochev 41'; Goldaniga (yellow card) 73'	Report	Conti 19'; Gómez 26'; Freuler (yellow card) 72'; Cristante 78'	Stadium: Stadio Renzo Barbera; Attendance: 12,844; Referee: Daniele Orsato

18 February 2017 25	Atalanta	1–0	Crotone	Bergamo
18:00 CET (UTC+01:00)	Conti 48', (yellow card) 78'; Freuler (yellow card) 52'	Report	Rosi (yellow card) 29'; Claiton (yellow card) 45'; Ferrari (yellow card) 58'; Crisetig (yellow card) 66'; Ceccherini (yellow card) 69'	Stadium: Stadio Atleti Azzurri d'Italia; Attendance: 17,577; Referee: Luca Banti

25 February 2017 26	Napoli	0–2	Atalanta	Naples
18:00 CET (UTC+01:00)	Hysaj (yellow card) 41'	Report	Caldara 28', 70'; Kessié (yellow card) 64' (yellow-red card) 67'; Berisha (yellow card) 77'	Stadium: Stadio San Paolo; Attendance: 45,800; Referee: Domenico Celi

5 March 2017 27	Atalanta	0–0	Fiorentina	Bergamo
12:30 CET (UTC+01:00)	D'Alessandro (yellow card) 35'; Masiello (yellow card) 53'	Report	Chiesa (yellow card) 31'; Iličić (yellow card) 50'; Gonzalo (yellow card) 54'; Astori (yellow card) 62'	Stadium: Stadio Atleti Azzurri d'Italia; Attendance: 18,919; Referee: Marco Guida

12 March 2017 28	Internazionale	7–1	Atalanta	Milan
15:00 CET (UTC+01:00)	Icardi 17', 23' (pen.), 26', (yellow card) 28'; Banega 31', 34', 68'; Gagliardini 52', (yellow card) 76'; Ansaldi (yellow card) 61'	Report	Toloi (yellow card) 15'; Berisha (yellow card) 23'; Zukanović (yellow card) 25'; Freuler 42'; Kurtić (yellow card) 71'	Stadium: San Siro; Attendance: 59,359; Referee: Massimiliano Irrati

19 March 2017 29	Atalanta	3–0	Pescara	Bergamo
15:00 CET (UTC+01:00)	Gómez 13', 90+3'; Masiello (yellow card) 62'; Grassi 69'; Hateboer (yellow card) 89'	Report	Muntari (yellow card) 27'; Verre (yellow card) 67'	Stadium: Stadio Atleti Azzurri d'Italia; Attendance: 17,844; Referee: Michael Fabbri

2 April 2017 30	Genoa	0–5	Atalanta	Genoa
15:00 CEST (UTC+02:00)	Rigoni (yellow card) 26'; Burdisso (yellow card) 47'; Pinilla (yellow card) 60' (red card) 60'	Report	Conti 25'; Gómez 32' (pen.), 63', 83'; Kessié (yellow card) 74'; Caldara 76'	Stadium: Stadio Luigi Ferraris; Attendance: 19,901; Referee: Claudio Gavillucci

8 April 2017 31	Atalanta	1–1	Sassuolo	Bergamo
18:00 CEST (UTC+02:00)	Cristante (yellow card) 27', (goal) 73'; Petagna (yellow card) 29'; Gómez (yellow card) 81'	Report	Pellegrini 36'; Cannavaro (yellow card) 77'; Missiroli (yellow card) 90'; Duncan (yellow card) 90+2'; Berardi (yellow card) 90+4'	Stadium: Stadio Atleti Azzurri d'Italia; Attendance: 18,209; Referee: Nicola Rizzoli

15 April 2017 32	Roma	1–1	Atalanta	Rome
15:00 CEST (UTC+02:00)	Džeko 50'; Mário Rui (yellow card) 72'; Rüdiger (yellow card) 87'	Report	Kurtić 22', (yellow card) 23'; Hateboer (yellow card) 42'; Gollini (yellow card) 70'	Stadium: Stadio Olimpico; Attendance: 34,546; Referee: Piero Giacomelli

22 April 2017 33	Atalanta	3–2	Bologna	Bergamo
18:00 CEST (UTC+02:00)	Conti 3'; Freuler 14'; Caldara (yellow card) 43', (goal) 75'; Masiello (yellow card) 78'	Report	Destro 16'; Džemaili (yellow card) 44'; Gastaldello (yellow card) 51'; Mbaye (yellow card) 57'; Di Francesco 61'	Stadium: Stadio Atleti Azzurri d'Italia; Attendance: 17,528; Referee: Carmine Russo

28 April 2017 34	Atalanta	2–2	Juventus	Bergamo
20:45 CEST (UTC+02:00)	Conti 45', (yellow card) 80'; Freuler (yellow card) 49', (goal) 89'; Gómez (yellow card) 85'	Report	Spinazzola 50' (o.g.); Cuadrado (yellow card) 75'; Dani Alves 83', (yellow card) 83'	Stadium: Stadio Atleti Azzurri d'Italia; Attendance: 19,650; Referee: Marco Guida

7 May 2017 35	Udinese	1–1	Atalanta	Udine
12:30 CEST (UTC+02:00)	Balić (yellow card) 34'; Felipe (yellow card) 43'; Perica 53'; Hallfreðsson (yellow card) 82'; De Paul (yellow card) 88'	Report	Raimondi (yellow card) 33'; Cristante 41'; Kurtić (yellow card) 55'; Masiello (yellow card) 61'	Stadium: Stadio Friuli; Attendance: 18,476; Referee: Marco Di Bello

13 May 2017 36	Atalanta	1–1	Milan	Bergamo
20:45 CEST (UTC+02:00)	Toloi (yellow card) 35'; Conti 44', (yellow card) 45'	Report	Suso (yellow card) 51'; Deulofeu 87'	Stadium: Stadio Atleti Azzurri d'Italia; Attendance: 19,656; Referee: Gianluca Rocchi

21 May 2017 37	Empoli	0–1	Atalanta	Empoli
15:00 CEST (UTC+02:00)	Pasqual (yellow card) 24'; Büchel (yellow card) 29'; El Kaddouri (yellow card) 70'	Report	Gómez 13'; Conti (yellow card) 24'; Masiello (yellow card) 39'	Stadium: Stadio Carlo Castellani; Attendance: 10,233; Referee: Paolo Valeri

27 May 2017 38	Atalanta	1–0	Chievo	Bergamo
18:00 CEST (UTC+02:00)	Gómez 52'; Caldara (yellow card) 77'	Report		Stadium: Stadio Atleti Azzurri d'Italia; Attendance: 19,217; Referee: Domenico Celi

=== Coppa Italia ===
13 August 2016 Third round	Atalanta	3–0	Cremonese	Bergamo
20:45 CEST (UTC+02:00)	Toloi 11'; Polák 31' (o.g.); Kessié 75'	Report	Scarsella (yellow card) 43'; Gambaretti (yellow card) 83'	Stadium: Stadio Atleti Azzurri d'Italia; Attendance: 4,143; Referee: Luca Pairetto

30 November 2016 Fourth round	Atalanta	3–0	Pescara	Bergamo
18:00 CET (UTC+01:00)	Raimondi 7', (yellow card) 76'; Grassi 29'; Pešić 90+3'	Report	Cristante (yellow card) 28'; Bruno (yellow card) 38'; Župarić (yellow card) 78'	Stadium: Stadio Atleti Azzurri d'Italia; Attendance: 6,344; Referee: Federico La Penna

11 January 2017 Round of 16	Juventus	3–2	Atalanta	Turin
20:45 CET (UTC+01:00)	Dybala 22'; Mandžukić 34'; Pjanić 75' (pen.)	Report	Grassi (yellow card) 29'; Toloi (yellow card) 64'; Latte Lath (yellow card) 70', (goal) 81'; Konko 72'; Freuler (yellow card) 90+4'	Stadium: Juventus Stadium; Attendance: 38,023; Referee: Piero Giacomelli

== Statistics ==
=== Appearances and goals ===
No.	Pos	Nat	Player	Total		Serie A		Coppa Italia	
No.	Pos	Nat	Player	Apps	Goals	Apps	Goals	Apps	Goals
Goalkeepers
1	GK	(Albania) ALB	Etrit Berisha	27	0	26	0	1	0
47	GK	(Italy) ITA	Stefano Mazzini	0	0	0	0	0	0
91	GK	(Italy) ITA	Pierluigi Gollini	4	0	4	0	0	0
Defenders
3	DF	(Brazil) BRA	Rafael Toloi	35	1	31+1	0	3	1
5	DF	(Italy) ITA	Andrea Masiello	38	3	34+1	3	2+1	0
6	DF	(Bosnia and Herzegovina) BIH	Ervin Zukanović	19	0	14+5	0	0	0
13	DF	(Italy) ITA	Mattia Caldara	31	7	30	7	1	0
24	DF	(Italy) ITA	Andrea Conti	35	8	31+2	8	1+1	0
25	DF	(France) FRA	Abdoulay Konko	11	1	7+3	0	0+1	1
33	DF	(Netherlands) NED	Hans Hateboer	6	0	3+3	0	0	0
37	DF	(Italy) ITA	Leonardo Spinazzola	32	0	28+2	0	2	0
93	DF	(Senegal) SEN	Boukary Dramé	12	0	8+2	0	2	0
95	DF	(Italy) ITA	Alessandro Bastoni	4	0	1+2	0	1	0
Midfielders
4	MF	(Italy) ITA	Bryan Cristante	12	3	7+5	3	0	0
7	MF	(Italy) ITA	Marco D'Alessandro	27	1	4+20	1	3	0
8	MF	(Italy) ITA	Giulio Migliaccio	4	0	0+3	0	0+1	0
11	MF	(Switzerland) SUI	Remo Freuler	35	5	29+4	5	2	0
19	MF	(Ivory Coast) CIV	Franck Kessié	31	7	25+5	6	1	1
27	MF	(Slovenia) SVN	Jasmin Kurtić	39	6	35+2	6	2	0
52	MF	(Ecuador) ECU	Bryan Cabezas	1	0	0+1	0	0	0
77	MF	(Italy) ITA	Cristian Raimondi	10	1	4+4	0	2	1
88	MF	(Italy) ITA	Alberto Grassi	20	2	4+14	1	2	1
94	MF	(Italy) ITA	Filippo Melegoni	1	0	1	0	0	0
Forwards
9	FW	(Serbia) SRB	Aleksandar Pešić	7	1	0+6	0	1	1
10	FW	(Argentina) ARG	Alejandro Gómez	39	16	37	16	1+1	0
29	FW	(Italy) ITA	Andrea Petagna	36	5	31+3	5	1+1	0
43	FW	(Italy) ITA	Alberto Paloschi	14	0	4+9	0	1	0
87	FW	(France) FRA	Anthony Mounier	5	0	0+5	0	0	0
98	FW	(Italy) ITA	Christian Capone	1	0	0	0	1	0
99	FW	(Ivory Coast) CIV	Emmanuel Latte Lath	3	1	0	0	0+3	1
Players transferred out during the season
2	DF	(Italy) ITA	Guglielmo Stendardo	1	0	0+1	0	0	0
4	MF	(Italy) ITA	Roberto Gagliardini	14	0	8+5	0	1	0
17	MF	(Chile) CHI	Carlos Carmona	2	0	2	0	0	0
51	FW	(Chile) CHI	Mauricio Pinilla	4	1	2+2	1	0	0
57	GK	(Italy) ITA	Marco Sportiello	10	0	8	0	2	0

Last updated: 27 May 2017
Source: Competitions

=== Goalscorers ===
Rank	No.	Pos	Nat	Name	Serie A	Coppa Italia	Total
1	10	FW	(Argentina)	Alejandro Gómez	16	0	16
2	24	DF	(Italy)	Andrea Conti	8	0	8
3	13	DF	(Italy)	Mattia Caldara	7	0	7
3	19	MF	(Ivory Coast)	Franck Kessié	6	1	7
5	27	MF	(Slovenia)	Jasmin Kurtić	6	0	6
6	11	MF	(Switzerland)	Remo Freuler	5	0	5
6	29	FW	(Italy)	Andrea Petagna	5	0	5
8	4	MF	(Italy)	Bryan Cristante	3	0	3
8	5	DF	(Italy)	Andrea Masiello	3	0	3
10	88	MF	(Italy)	Alberto Grassi	1	1	2
11	3	DF	(Brazil)	Rafael Toloi	0	1	1
11	7	MF	(Italy)	Marco D'Alessandro	1	0	1
11	9	FW	(Serbia)	Aleksandar Pešić	0	1	1
11	25	DF	(France)	Abdoulay Konko	0	1	1
11	51	FW	(Chile)	Mauricio Pinilla	1	0	1
11	77	MF	(Italy)	Cristian Raimondi	0	1	1
11	99	FW	(Ivory Coast)	Emmanuel Latte Lath	0	1	1
Own goal					0	1	1
Totals					62	8	70

Last updated: 27 May 2017

=== Clean sheets ===
Rank	No.	Pos	Nat	Name	Serie A	Coppa Italia	Total
1	1	GK	(Albania)	Etrit Berisha	11	0	11
2	57	GK	(Italy)	Marco Sportiello	2	2	4
3	91	GK	(Italy)	Pierluigi Gollini	3	0	3
Totals					16	2	18

Last updated: 27 May 2017

=== Disciplinary record ===
No.	Pos	Nat	Player	Serie A			Coppa Italia			Total		
No.	Pos	Nat	Player	Booked	(yellow card) (yellow-red card)	Sent off (straight red)	Booked	(yellow card) (yellow-red card)	Sent off (straight red)	Booked	(yellow card) (yellow-red card)	Sent off (straight red)
1	GK	(Albania)	Etrit Berisha	2	0	0	0	0	0	2	0	0
30	GK	(Italy)	Davide Bassi	0	0	0	0	0	0	0	0	0
47	GK	(Italy)	Stefano Mazzini	0	0	0	0	0	0	0	0	0
57	GK	(Italy)	Marco Sportiello	1	0	0	0	0	0	1	0	0
91	GK	(Italy)	Pierluigi Gollini	1	0	0	0	0	0	1	0	0
2	DF	(Italy)	Guglielmo Stendardo	0	0	0	0	0	0	0	0	0
3	DF	(Brazil)	Rafael Toloi	7	0	0	1	0	0	8	0	0
5	DF	(Italy)	Andrea Masiello	9	0	0	0	0	0	9	0	0
6	DF	(Bosnia and Herzegovina)	Ervin Zukanović	1	0	0	0	0	0	1	0	0
13	DF	(Italy)	Mattia Caldara	4	0	0	0	0	0	4	0	0
23	DF	(Italy)	Emanuele Suagher	0	0	0	0	0	0	0	0	0
24	DF	(Italy)	Andrea Conti	12	0	0	0	0	0	12	0	0
25	DF	(France)	Abdoulay Konko	2	0	0	0	0	0	2	0	0
33	DF	(Netherlands)	Hans Hateboer	2	0	0	0	0	0	2	0	0
37	DF	(Italy)	Leonardo Spinazzola	2	0	0	0	0	0	2	0	0
93	DF	(Senegal)	Boukary Dramé	1	0	0	0	0	0	1	0	0
4	MF	(Italy)	Bryan Cristante	1	0	0	0	0	0	1	0	0
4	MF	(Italy)	Roberto Gagliardini	5	0	0	0	0	0	5	0	0
7	MF	(Italy)	Marco D'Alessandro	2	0	0	0	0	0	2	0	0
8	MF	(Italy)	Giulio Migliaccio	0	0	0	0	0	0	0	0	0
11	MF	(Switzerland)	Remo Freuler	5	0	0	1	0	0	6	0	0
17	MF	(Chile)	Carlos Carmona	1	1	0	0	0	0	1	1	0
19	MF	(Ivory Coast)	Franck Kessié	5	1	1	0	0	0	5	1	1
27	MF	(Slovenia)	Jasmin Kurtić	7	0	0	0	0	0	7	0	0
77	MF	(Italy)	Cristian Raimondi	3	0	0	1	0	0	4	0	0
88	MF	(Italy)	Alberto Grassi	2	0	0	1	0	0	3	0	0
9	FW	(Serbia)	Aleksandar Pešić	0	0	0	0	0	0	0	0	0
10	FW	(Argentina)	Alejandro Gómez	6	0	0	0	0	0	6	0	0
29	FW	(Italy)	Andrea Petagna	2	0	0	0	0	0	2	0	0
43	FW	(Italy)	Alberto Paloschi	0	0	0	0	0	0	0	0	0
51	FW	(Chile)	Mauricio Pinilla	2	0	0	0	0	0	2	0	0
87	FW	(France)	Anthony Mounier	0	0	0	0	0	0	0	0	0
99	FW	(Ivory Coast)	Emmanuel Latte Lath	0	0	0	1	0	0	1	0	0
Totals				85	2	1	5	0	0	90	2	1

Last updated: 27 May 2017
