= Bryan Cristante =

Italian footballer (born 1995)

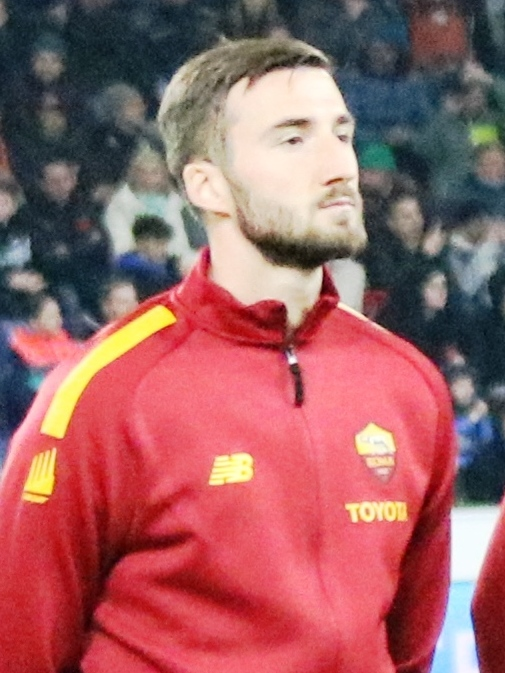
- Cristante lining up for Roma in 2023

Personal information
- Full name: Bryan Cristante
- Date of birth: 3 March 1995 (age 31)
- Place of birth: San Vito al Tagliamento, Italy
- Height: 1.86 m (6 ft 1 in)
- Position: Defensive midfielder

Team information
- Current team: Roma
- Number: 4

Youth career
- 2006–2009: Liventina Gorghense
- 2009–2013: AC Milan

Senior career*
Years	Team	Apps	(Gls)
2011–2014	AC Milan	3	(1)
2014–2018	Benfica	7	(0)
2016	→ Palermo (loan)	4	(0)
2016–2017	→ Pescara (loan)	16	(0)
2017–2018	→ Atalanta (loan)	48	(12)
2018–2019	Atalanta	0	(0)
2018–2019	→ Roma (loan)	35	(4)
2019–	Roma	242	(15)

International career^{‡}
2010	Italy U16	2	(0)
2011–2012	Italy U17	10	(0)
2012–2013	Italy U18	6	(3)
2013–2014	Italy U19	9	(4)
2014	Italy U20	1	(0)
2016	Italy U21	2	(0)
2017–	Italy	48	(2)
Medal record
Men's Football
Representing Italy
UEFA European Championship
Winner	2020 Europe
UEFA Nations League
Third place	2021 Italy
Third place	2023 Netherlands
- * Club domestic league appearances and goals as of 22:35, 31 October 2026 (UTC) ‡ National team caps and goals as of 31 March 2026

Bryan Cristante Cavaliere OMRI (born 3 March 1995) is an Italian professional footballer who plays as a defensive midfielder for Serie A club Roma, which he captains, and the Italy national team.

== Early life ==
Cristante was born to a Canadian father of Italian descent and an Italian mother in San Vito al Tagliamento, Italy. He grew up in the district of San Giovanni in Casarsa della Delizia. Cristante's parents named him Bryan in honour of English singer Bryan Ferry. He holds dual Canadian–Italian citizenship.

== Club career ==
=== Early career ===
Cristante was born in San Vito al Tagliamento but raised in the nearby San Giovanni di Casarsa, where he started playing football as a child. He moved on to Liventina Gorghense, an amateur club in the province of Treviso, before joining AC Milan in 2009.

=== AC Milan ===
Throughout his time in AC Milan's youth system he was a member of the under-15 squad who won the Campionato Giovanissimi Nazionali in 2010, scoring eight goals, as well as a member of the under-17 side who won the Campionato Allievi Nazionali in 2011.

He made his professional debut for the club on 6 December 2011, aged 16 years and 278 days, coming on as a substitute for Robinho in a UEFA Champions League group stage match against Viktoria Plzeň, which ended in a 2–2 draw. He thus became the youngest ever Milan player to feature in a Champions League game and third youngest overall.

Cristante was elected as the best player at the Torneo di Viareggio 2013. On 4 March 2013, Cristante signed his first professional contract, which would have kept him at Milan until 2018. He joined the first team squad at the start of the 2013–14 season.

On 10 November 2013, he made his debut in Serie A, coming on as a substitute for Kaká in a match against Chievo Verona, which ended in a 0–0 draw. He scored his first goal for the club on 6 January 2014, set up by the Brazilian in a 3–0 victory at the San Siro against Atalanta.

=== Benfica ===
On 1 September 2014, Cristante signed a five-year contract with Portuguese champions Benfica for a transfer fee of €4.84 million.

On 12 December, he debuted in a 0–5 Primeira Liga victory at Vitória Setúbal. On 14 January, he scored his first goal for the club in a 4–0 win against Arouca in the third round of the league cup.

=== Atalanta ===
Cristante joined Atalanta on loan from Benfica in January 2017; Atalanta later bought him outright in summer 2018 for the €4 million release clause, in a total fee of €9.5 million, with Benfica keeping 15% of Cristante's economic rights.

=== Roma ===
On 8 June 2018, Cristante was immediately loaned out to Roma in a one-year loan deal from Atalanta for a fee of €5 million with a compulsory purchase option for an additional €15 million and a further €10 million in performance-related bonuses. On 28 February 2019, Roma made the deal permanent.

On 22 February 2026, on his 350th Roma appearance, Cristante scored in a home game against Cremonese.

== International career ==
Prior to representing the Italian senior side, Cristante also represented Italy at various youth levels. He was initially also eligible to play for Canada at international level, as he holds a Canadian passport through his father.

On 10 November 2016, he made his debut with the Italy U21 team, in a friendly match lost 3–2 against England in Southampton.

Cristante was called up to the senior Italy national team for the side's 2018 World Cup qualifying matches against Macedonia and Albania on 6 and 9 October 2017, respectively. He made his senior international debut on 6 October, coming on as a substitute in the second half of an eventual 1–1 home draw against Macedonia. Cristante scored his first goal for the national team on 7 October 2020, the first goal of a 6–0 home win against Moldova in a friendly match.

In June 2021, he was included in Italy's squad for UEFA Euro 2020 by manager Roberto Mancini. On 11 July, Cristante won the European Championship with Italy following a 3–2 penalty shoot-out victory over England at Wembley Stadium in the final, after a 1–1 draw in extra-time; Cristante made a substitute appearance during the final, coming on for Nicolò Barella in the second half of regulation time, and played a role in helping Italy score the equalizing goal by setting up the goal of Leonardo Bonucci following a corner kick.

== Style of play ==
Cristante is known for his technical ability, vision, physicality, and versatility in central areas of the pitch, which allows him to win back possession and start attacking plays; moreover, he is adept with either foot and is also capable of making late attacking runs into the penalty area. While he is not known for his heading ability, his height also makes him effective in the air. Having started his senior career at Milan as a deep-lying playmaker or a regista in Italian, he successfully transitioned into an attacking midfielder, or a trequartista, in the 3–4–1–2 formation employed by manager Gian Piero Gasperini at Atalanta, which led him to score 15 times in just one and a half seasons for the club; he has also been used out wide on occasion. However, at Roma, while mostly playing as an offensive–minded central midfielder, known as the mezzala role in Italian football jargon, Cristante also began to be used as a central defender in the middle of a back three, courtesy of his positional sense, as well as his ability to play out or carry the ball out from the back.

== Career statistics ==
=== Club ===
As of match played 31 October 2026

Appearances and goals by club, season and competition
Club	Season	League			National cup (Note: Includes Coppa Italia, Taça de Portugal)		League cup (Note: Includes Taça da Liga)		Europe		Other		Total	
Club	Season	Division	Apps	Goals	Apps	Goals	Apps	Goals	Apps	Goals	Apps	Goals	Apps	Goals
AC Milan	2011–12	Serie A	0	0	0	0	—		1 (Note: Appearance(s) in UEFA Champions League)	0	0	0	1	0
AC Milan	2012–13	Serie A	0	0	0	0	—		0	0	—		0	0
AC Milan	2013–14	Serie A	3	1	1	0	—		0	0	—		4	1
AC Milan	Total		3	1	1	0	—		1	0	0	0	5	1
Benfica	2014–15	Primeira Liga	5	0	3	0	4	1	3	0	—		15	1
Benfica	2015–16	Primeira Liga	2	0	0	0	1	0	2	0	0	0	5	0
Benfica	Total		7	0	3	0	5	1	5	0	0	0	20	1
Palermo (loan)	2015–16	Serie A	4	0	0	0	—		—		—		4	0
Pescara (loan)	2016–17	Serie A	16	0	2	0	—		—		—		18	0
Atalanta (loan)	2016–17	Serie A	12	3	—		—		—		—		12	3
Atalanta (loan)	2017–18	Serie A	36	9	3	0	—		8 (Note: Appearances in UEFA Europa League)	3	—		47	12
Atalanta (loan)	Total		48	12	3	0	—		8	3	—		59	15
Roma (loan)	2018–19	Serie A	35	4	2	0	—		7	0	—		44	4
Roma	2019–20	Serie A	26	1	2	0	—		5	0	—		33	1
Roma	2020–21	Serie A	34	1	1	0	—		13	1	—		48	2
Roma	2021–22	Serie A	34	2	2	0	—		14 (Note: Appearances in UEFA Europa Conference League)	1	—		50	3
Roma	2022–23	Serie A	36	1	2	0	—		15	0	—		53	1
Roma	2023–24	Serie A	37	3	2	0	—		13	1	—		52	4
Roma	2024–25	Serie A	30	4	0	0	—		8	0	—		38	4
Roma	2025–26	Serie A	37	2	1	0	—		8	0	—		46	2
Roma	2026–27	Serie A	8	1	0	0	—		1	1	—		9	2
Roma	Roma total		277	19	12	0	—		84	4	—		373	23
Career total			355	32	21	0	5	1	98	7	0	0	479	40

=== International ===
As of match played 31 March 2026

Appearances and goals by national team and year
National team	Year	Apps	Goals
Italy	2017	1	0
Italy	2018	5	0
Italy	2019	1	0
Italy	2020	2	1
Italy	2021	13	0
Italy	2022	7	1
Italy	2023	9	0
Italy	2024	5	0
Italy	2025	4	0
Italy	2026	1	0
Total		48	2

Scores and results list Italy's goal tally first, score column indicates score after each Cristante goal.

List of international goals scored by Bryan Cristante
No.	Date	Venue	Cap	Opponent	Score	Result	Competition
1	7 October 2020	Stadio Artemio Franchi, Florence, Italy	9	Moldova	1–0	6–0	Friendly
2	29 March 2022	Konya Metropolitan Municipality Stadium, Konya, Turkey	23	Turkey	1–1	3–2	Friendly

== Honours ==
Benfica

- Primeira Liga: 2014–15, 2015–16
- Taça da Liga: 2014–15, 2015–16

Roma

- UEFA Europa Conference League: 2021–22
- UEFA Europa League runner-up: 2022–23

Italy

- UEFA European Championship: 2020
- UEFA Nations League third place: 2020–21, 2022–23

Individual

- Torneo di Viareggio – Golden Boy: 2013

Orders

- 5th Class / Knight: Cavaliere Ordine al Merito della Repubblica Italiana: 2021
