= Andrea Conti (footballer, born 1994) =

Italian footballer (born 1994)

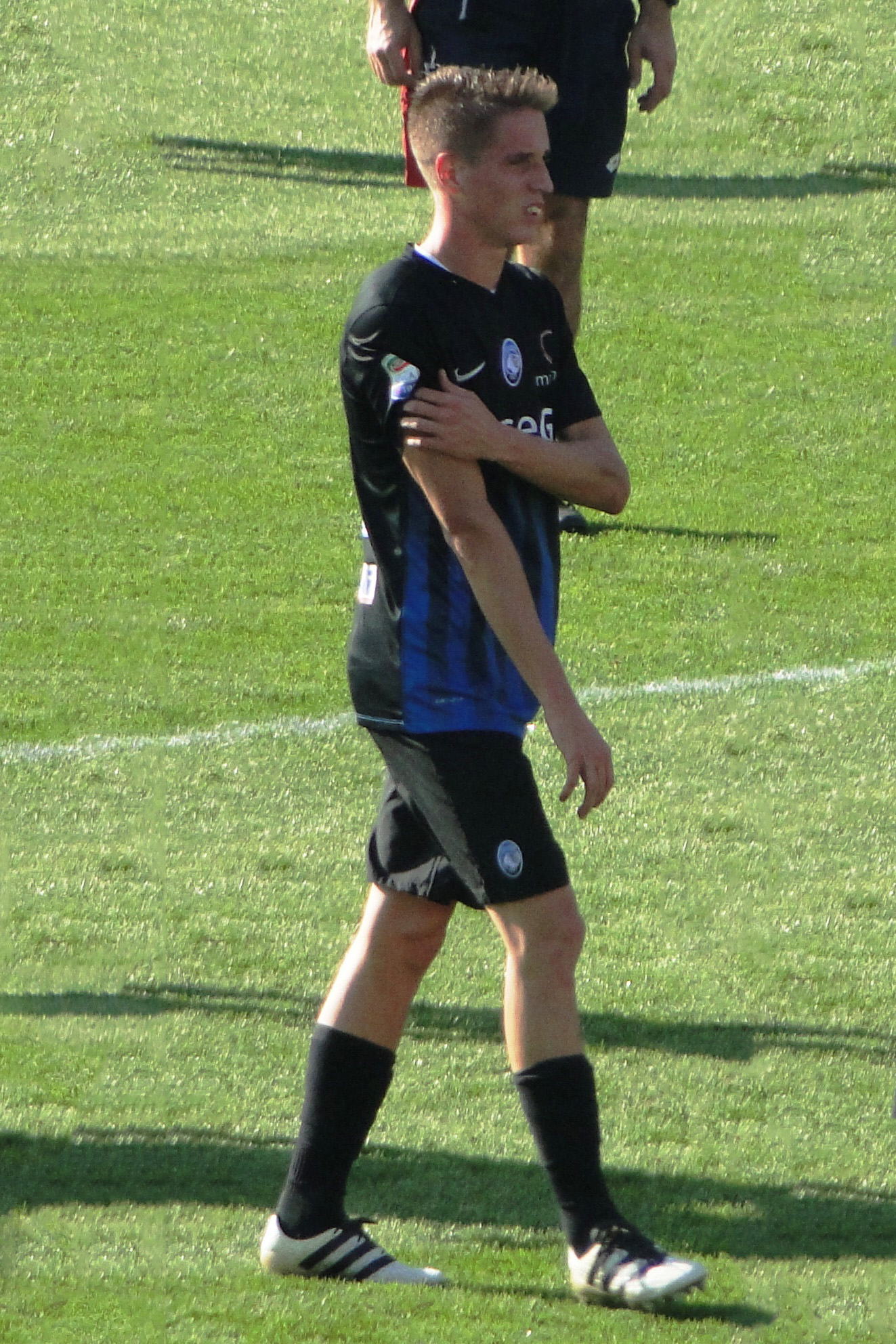
- Conti with Atalanta in 2016

Personal information
- Date of birth: 2 March 1994 (age 32)
- Place of birth: Lecco, Italy
- Height: 1.84 m (6 ft 0 in)

Youth career
- 2001–2002: Lecco
- 2003–2013: Atalanta

Senior career*
| Years | Team | Apps | (Gls) |
| 2013–2017 | Atalanta | 47 | (10) |
| 2013–2014 | → Perugia (loan) | 17 | (0) |
| 2014–2015 | → Lanciano (loan) | 24 | (0) |
| 2017–2022 | AC Milan | 41 | (0) |
| 2021 | → Parma (loan) | 11 | (0) |
| 2022–2024 | Sampdoria | 9 | (1) |

International career
| 2010–2011 | Italy U17 | 9 | (0) |
| 2011 | Italy U18 | 3 | (0) |
| 2014 | Italy U20 | 3 | (0) |
| 2015–2017 | Italy U21 | 17 | (1) |
| 2017 | Italy | 1 | (0) |
- * Club domestic league appearances and goals as of 00:19, 12 August 2024 (UTC)

Andrea Conti (Italian pronunciation: [anˈdrɛːa ˈkonti]; born 2 March 1994) is a former Italian professional footballer who played as a right-back.

== Club career ==
=== Atalanta ===
Conti was born and raised in Lecco, Lombardy. In 2002, he had a successful trial at AC Milan yet refused to join the team due to his dislike of the club's youth training center in Linate area of the city, as well as its far-from-home location. He also had an offer from the club's cross-city rivals, Inter Milan, yet eventually joined Atalanta's youth academy where he would play together with Mattia Caldara and Roberto Gagliardini for over a decade.

In July 2013, Conti was loaned to Lega Pro side Perugia. He made his professional debut on 4 August 2013, starting in a 1–0 Coppa Italia home loss against Savona. His first league appearance occurred later that month, a 2–2 away draw against Nocerina. Conti made 16 league appearances, helping his team achieve promotion to Serie B.

On 10 July 2014, Conti moved to a fellow second-tier team Virtus Lanciano, in a season-long loan deal. Conti made 24 league appearances while his team finished 14th out of 22. In the summer of 2015, he returned to Atalanta and was included in the first team squad for the upcoming Serie A season.

On 30 September 2015, Conti signed a new contract with Atalanta until July 2019. He made his debut for the club on 2 December, in a 3–1 loss against Udinese in Coppa Italia. Conti made his debut in Serie A on 6 January 2016, in a 2–1 loss against the same opponent. His first goal in the competition occurred on 3 February, in a 2–1 win against Verona.

Conti managed to score eight goals in 33 appearances during the 2016–17 Serie A season, setting a personal record for scoring. His main playing position was a right wing-back in a 3–4–3 formation.

=== AC Milan ===
On 7 July 2017, Conti joined AC Milan in exchange for a reported fee of €24 million, plus Matteo Pessina. He made his debut for the club on 27 July 2017, replacing Ignazio Abate as a second-half substitute in the 2017–18 UEFA Europa League qualification away game against CS U Craiova. He made his league debut in the 3–0 away win against Crotone on 20 August 2017.

On 15 September 2017, during Milan's training session, Conti suffered an injury to his left anterior cruciate ligament. Having undergone knee surgery, he was in recovery until March 2018. However, shortly after resuming training and playing a few matches with the reserves, Conti suffered a recurring ACL injury that sidelined him for the rest of the year.

On 22 December 2018, Conti made his highly anticipated return to the pitch, coming on as a substitute for Ignazio Abate eleven minutes before the final whistle in a 1–0 home Serie A defeat against Fiorentina. Before the end of the season, he appeared in 14 more games (mostly as a substitute) and made three assists.

Despite the two unsuccessful seasons in Milan, Conti declined transfer offers from Parma and Werder Bremen during the summer of 2019, opting to stay at the club and work with its new head coach Marco Giampaolo, under whom he made just two appearances before Stefano Pioli took over the managerial duties in October 2019. Since Pioli's appointment, Conti began to play consistently as a starting right back until yet another knee injury sustained on 21 July 2020 in the away Serie A game against Sassuolo. On 29 October 2020, Conti returned to the pitch as a substitute in the home Europa League game against Sparta Prague and in the reverse fixture on 10 December 2020 returned to the starting line up for the first time since his summer injury; as several senior players were given a rest, Conti served as the team's captain for the first time in his Milan career.

=== Parma ===
On 21 January 2021, Conti joined Parma on a six-month loan deal containing an obligatory purchase clause. However, as Parma finished the season on the bottom of the table and were relegated to Serie B, the clause was not triggered.

=== Sampdoria ===
On 10 January 2022, Conti moved to Sampdoria.

On 18 April 2025, Conti announced his retirement at the age of 31.

== International career ==
On 12 August 2015, Conti made his debut with the Italy U21 team in a friendly match against Hungary.

In June 2017, he was included in the Italy under-21 squad for the 2017 UEFA European Under-21 Championship by manager Luigi Di Biagio. Italy was eliminated by Spain in the semifinals on 27 June, following a 3–1 defeat, although Conti did not appear during the match.

In May 2017, he was first called up to the senior squad by Gian Piero Ventura for the match for the San Marino friendly. In August 2017, he was called up to the senior squad by Gian Piero Ventura for the 2018 World Cup qualification match against Spain on 2 September and on 5 September against Israel. He made his senior international debut in Italy's 1–0 home win over Israel, but was forced off early due to injury and replaced by Davide Zappacosta.

== Style of play ==
Conti can play as a right-back or a right wing-back, although he is more comfortable in the latter position. With his pace, he is known for going forward and making overlapping runs. His level of stamina allows him to make attacking runs and rapidly get back into defense when needed.

== Career statistics ==
=== Club ===
As of match played 9 December 2023

Appearances and goals by club, season and competition
| Club | Season | League | | | Cup | | Europe | | Other | | Total | |
| Club | Season | Division | Apps | Goals | Apps | Goals | Apps | Goals | Apps | Goals | Apps | Goals |
|---|---|---|---|---|---|---|---|---|---|---|---|---|
| Perugia (loan) | 2013–14 | Lega Pro Prima Divisione | 16 | 0 | 4 (Note: Three appearances in Coppa Italia Lega Pro, one appearance in Coppa Italia.) | 0 | — | | 1 (Note: All appearance(s) in Supercoppa di Lega Pro.) | 0 | 17 | 0 |
| Virtus Lanciano (loan) | 2014–15 | Serie B | 24 | 0 | 1 | 0 | — | | — | | 25 | 0 |
| Atalanta | 2015–16 | Serie A | 14 | 2 | 1 | 0 | — | | — | | 15 | 2 |
| Atalanta | 2016–17 | Serie A | 33 | 8 | 2 | 0 | — | | — | | 35 | 8 |
| Atalanta | Total | | 47 | 10 | 3 | 0 | — | | — | | 50 | 10 |
| AC Milan | 2017–18 | Serie A | 2 | 0 | 0 | 0 | 3 | 0 | — | | 5 | 0 |
| AC Milan | 2018–19 | Serie A | 12 | 0 | 2 | 0 | 0 | 0 | 1 | 0 | 15 | 0 |
| AC Milan | 2019–20 | Serie A | 23 | 0 | 3 | 0 | — | | — | | 26 | 0 |
| AC Milan | 2020–21 | Serie A | 3 | 0 | 0 | 0 | 2 | 0 | — | | 5 | 0 |
| AC Milan | 2021–22 | Serie A | 1 | 0 | 0 | 0 | 0 | 0 | — | | 1 | 0 |
| AC Milan | Total | | 41 | 0 | 5 | 0 | 5 | 0 | 1 | 0 | 52 | 0 |
| Parma (loan) | 2020–21 | Serie A | 11 | 0 | 0 | 0 | — | | — | | 11 | 0 |
| Sampdoria | 2021–22 | Serie A | 7 | 1 | 1 | 1 | — | | — | | 8 | 2 |
| Sampdoria | 2022–23 | Serie A | 1 | 0 | 1 | 0 | — | | — | | 2 | 0 |
| Sampdoria | 2023–24 | Serie B | 1 | 0 | 1 | 0 | — | | — | | 2 | 0 |
| Sampdoria | Total | | 9 | 1 | 3 | 1 | — | | — | | 12 | 2 |
| Career total | | | 148 | 11 | 16 | 1 | 5 | 0 | 2 | 0 | 171 | 12 |

=== International ===
As of 5 September 2017

Appearances and goals by national team and year
| National team | Year | Apps | Goals |
|---|---|---|---|
| Italy | 2017 | 1 | 0 |
| Total | | 1 | 0 |

== Honours ==
Perugia

- Lega Pro Prima Divisione: 2013–14
- Supercoppa di Lega Pro: 2014

AC Milan

- Coppa Italia runner-up: 2017–18
- Supercoppa Italiana runner-up: 2018
