= Luca Vido =

Italian footballer (born 1997)

Personal information
- Full name: Luca Vido
- Date of birth: 3 February 1997 (age 29)
- Place of birth: Bassano del Grappa, Italy
- Height: 1.82 m (6 ft 0 in)
- Position: Forward

Team information
- Current team: Monopoli (on loan from Union Brescia)
- Number: 28

Youth career
- Favaro Veneto
- –2009: Treviso
- 2009–2011: Padova
- 2011–2015: AC Milan

Senior career*
Years	Team	Apps	(Gls)
2015–2017	AC Milan	0	(0)
2017	→ Cittadella (loan)	12	(4)
2017–2023	Atalanta	4	(0)
2018	→ Cittadella (loan)	17	(2)
2018–2019	→ Perugia (loan)	33	(11)
2019–2020	→ Crotone (loan)	13	(0)
2020–2021	→ Pisa (loan)	45	(9)
2021–2022	→ Cremonese (loan)	14	(3)
2022	→ SPAL (loan)	16	(3)
2022–2023	→ Palermo (loan)	25	(1)
2023–2025	Reggiana	31	(7)
2025–	Union Brescia	15	(2)
2026–	→ Monopoli (loan)	4	(0)

International career^{‡}
2012	Italy U15	8	(4)
2012	Italy U16	2	(0)
2013–2014	Italy U17	11	(5)
2013–2015	Italy U18	2	(2)
2014–2016	Italy U19	7	(4)
2016–2017	Italy U20	8	(2)
2017–2018	Italy U21	9	(3)
Medal record
Men's football
Representing Italy
FIFA U-20 World Cup
Third place	2017 South Korea
- * Club domestic league appearances and goals as of 27 September 2026 ‡ National team caps and goals as of 15 October 2018

Luca Vido (born 3 February 1997) is an Italian professional footballer who plays as a forward for Serie C Group C club Monopoli on loan from Union Brescia.

== Club career ==
Vido made his professional debut in the Serie B for Cittadella on 4 February 2017 in a game against Pro Vercelli.

On 27 July 2018, Vido signed to Serie B side Perugia on loan from Atalanta until 30 June 2019.

On 31 July 2019, he joined Crotone on loan. On 13 January 2020, he moved on a new loan to Pisa, also in Serie B. The loan was renewed for the 2020–21 season on 10 September 2020. On 12 July 2021, he moved on loan to Cremonese, once again in Serie B. On 31 January 2022, Vido moved on loan to SPAL.

On 1 September 2022, Vido was loaned out to Serie B club Palermo, with an option to buy.

On 3 August 2023, Vido signed a contract with Reggiana for two years, with an option to extend for two more years, conditional on performance.

== International career ==
Vido represented Italy U17 national team at the 2013 UEFA European Under-17 Championship, where Italy was the runner-up, and at the 2013 FIFA U-17 World Cup.

With the Italy U20 he took part at the 2017 FIFA U-20 World Cup.

On 4 September 2017, he made his debut with the Italy U21 in a friendly match against Slovenia.

== Career statistics ==
=== Club ===
As of match played 20 October 2024

Appearances and goals by club, season and competition
Club	Season	League			Cup		Europe		Other		Total	
Club	Season	Division	Apps	Goals	Apps	Goals	Apps	Goals	Apps	Goals	Apps	Goals
Cittadella (loan)	2016–17	Serie B	12	4	0	0	–		–		12	4
Atalanta	2017–18	Serie A	4	0	0	0	–		–		4	0
Cittadella (loan)	2017–18	Serie B	17	2	0	0	–		3	0	20	2
Perugia (loan)	2018–19	Serie B	33	11	1	1	–		–		34	12
Crotone (loan)	2019–20	Serie B	13	0	0	0	–		–		13	0
Pisa (loan)	2019–20	Serie B	16	3	0	0	–		–		16	3
Pisa (loan)	2020–21	Serie B	29	6	2	0	–		–		31	6
Pisa (loan)	Total		45	9	2	0	0	0	0	0	47	9
Cremonese (loan)	2021–22	Serie B	14	3	1	0	–		–		15	3
SPAL (loan)	2021–22	Serie B	16	3	0	0	–		–		16	3
Palermo (loan)	2022–23	Serie B	25	1	0	0	–		–		25	1
Reggiana	2023–24	Serie B	3	1	2	1	–		–		5	2
Reggiana	2024–25	Serie B	8	2	1	0	–		–		9	2
Reggiana	Total		11	3	3	1	0	0	0	0	14	4
Career total			190	36	7	2	0	0	3	0	200	38

== Honours ==
Italy U20

- FIFA U-20 World Cup bronze medals:2017
