= Mattia Caldara =

Italian footballer (born 1994)

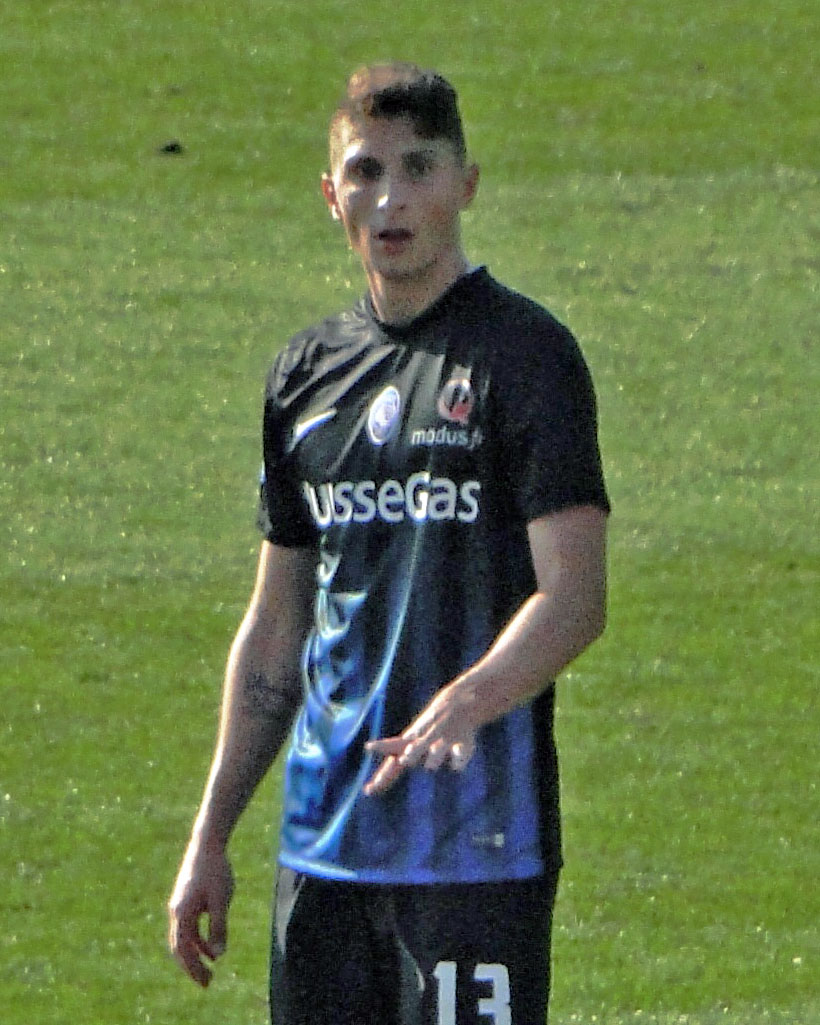
- Caldara with Atalanta in 2016

Personal information
- Date of birth: 5 May 1994 (age 32)
- Place of birth: Bergamo, Italy
- Height: 1.87 m (6 ft 2 in)
- Position: Centre-back

Youth career
- 2003–2014: Atalanta

Senior career*
Years	Team	Apps	(Gls)
2014–2017	Atalanta	12	(3)
2014–2015	→ Trapani (loan)	20	(2)
2015–2016	→ Cesena (loan)	27	(3)
2017–2018	Juventus	0	(0)
2017–2018	→ Atalanta (loan)	43	(7)
2018–2024	AC Milan	1	(0)
2020–2021	→ Atalanta (loan)	20	(0)
2021–2022	→ Venezia (loan)	31	(1)
2022–2023	→ Spezia (loan)	20	(0)
2024–2025	Modena	26	(1)
Total		200	(17)

International career
2016–2017	Italy U21	12	(0)
2018	Italy	2	(0)
- * Club domestic league appearances and goals

Mattia Caldara (Italian pronunciation: [matˈtiːa kalˈdaːra]; born 5 May 1994) is an Italian former professional footballer who played as a centre back.

== Club career ==
=== Atalanta ===
==== 2013–14 season ====
Born in Bergamo, Caldara began his career with hometown club Atalanta, entering in the youth categories. He played for the Primavera team from 2011 to 2014 (2013–14 season as an overage player). On 5 May 2014, his 20th birthday, Caldara made his professional debut coming on as a second-half substitute in a Serie A match against Catania.

==== Loan to Trapani ====
On 3 July 2014, he was loaned to Serie B side Trapani to gain more experience. On 14 August he made his debut as a starter in a 2–1 home defeat against Cremonese in the second round of Coppa Italia. On 7 September, Caldara made his Serie B debut as a substitute replacing Enis Nadarevic in the 62nd minute of a 2–1 home win over Vicenza. On 13 September he played his first entire match in Serie B for Trapani, a 2–1 home win against Cittadella. On 16 May, Caldara scored his first professional goal in the 96th minute of a 1–1 away draw against Avellino. On 22 May he scored his second goal in the 49th minute of a 2–1 home win over Pro Vercelli. Caldara ended his season-long loan to Trapani with 21 appearances and 2 goals.

==== Loan to Cesena ====
On 10 July 2015, Caldara was signed by Serie B side Cesena on a temporary deal, with an option to purchase. On 9 August he made his debut for Cesena in a 4–0 home win over Lecce in the second round of Coppa Italia. On 20 August he played in the third round, a 4–1 away win over Catania. On 5 September, Caldara made his Serie B debut for Cesena, as a starter, in a 2–0 home win against Brescia. On 21 November, Caldara scored his first goal for Cesena in the 28th minute of a 1–1 away draw against Vicenza. On 8 December he was sent off with a double yellow card in the 89th minute of a 0–0 home draw against Trapani. On 19 December he scored his second goal in the 78th minute of a 4–0 home win over Ternana. On 23 January he scored his third goal in the 57th minute of a 2–0 home win over Virtus Entella. On 7 March, Caldara was sent off for the second time with a double yellow card in the 27th minute of a 2–1 home defeat against Salernitana. Caldara ended his loan to Cesena with 29 appearances, all as a starter, and 2 goals.

==== 2016–17 season: Return to Atalanta ====
After impressing newly appointed head coach Gian Piero Gasperini during pre-season, Caldara cemented a first-team place for the 2016–17 season; in manager's favored 3–4–3 formation, he began to play in the center of a back three. On 2 October he made his post-return debut in Serie A for Atalanta in a 1–0 home win over Napoli. On 26 October, Caldara scored his first goal for Atalanta and the only goal in the 60th minute of a 1–0 away win over Pescara. On 6 November he scored his second goal for Atalanta in the 24th minute of a 3–0 away win over Sassuolo. On 20 November he scored his third goal in 62nd minute of a 2–1 home win against Roma. After beating Everton in the Europa League, Caldara gained notoriety when he took off his outer clothes and strutted around the field in his briefs.

=== Juventus ===
On 12 January 2017, Juventus announced that they had signed Caldara to a four-and-a-half-year contract for an initial transfer fee of €15 million, rising to a potential €25 million with add-ons. The deal also included a free loan, remaining at Atalanta until 30 June 2018.

Following the end of his loan deal with Atalanta, Caldara moved to Turin, where on 13 July 2018 he was officially presented as Juventus player and given the number 13 jersey with his last name on. He played his debut and only game for Juventus on 25 July 2018, an International Champions Cup friendly against Bayern Munich, replacing captain Giorgio Chiellini eight minutes into the second half.

=== AC Milan ===
==== 2018–19 season ====
On 2 August 2018, Caldara was signed by AC Milan on a five-year contract for €35 million payable in two years, with Leonardo Bonucci moving in the opposite direction in a similar deal. Unable to choose 13 as his shirt number to pay tribute to Alessandro Nesta since it had already been taken by Alessio Romagnoli for the same reason, he opted for an available number 33, citing admiration for Thiago Silva. In his first month at Milanello, Caldara struggled with adapting to a four-man defense line with zonal marking, having played for most of his career in teams that utilized a three-man defense with man-marking.

On 20 September 2018, Caldara made his official debut for Milan, starting alongside Romagnoli in a Europa League away match against F91 Dudelange. However, he failed to make a single appearance in October 2018, struggling with pubalgia. Later that month, he suffered an Achilles tendon rupture, which sidelined him until February 2019. On 24 April 2019, Caldara made his second start for Milan, playing for 65 minutes in the eventual 1–0 loss to Lazio in the Coppa Italia semi-final, which saw Milan eliminated at the San Siro on aggregate score.

On 2 May 2019, Caldara ruptured his left anterior cruciate ligament after collision with Fabio Borini in a training game, an injury that sidelined him for another period of 6 months. Prior to the injury, he was due to make his first start for Milan in the next Serie A game after Alessio Romagnoli had been suspended for a red card.

==== 2019–20 season ====
Ahead of the 2019–20 season, Caldara gave away his number 33 shirt to Rade Krunić and later settled on the number 31 instead. Having recovered from his ACL injury, he resumed training sessions at full capacity on 9 October 2019, which coincided with Stefano Pioli's first day in Milan as a head coach. However, as Pioli was still reluctant to include Caldara in the first team line-ups 3 months since his full recovery from injuries, he submitted a loan or transfer request in early January 2020.

==== Return to Atalanta ====
On 12 January 2020, it was announced that Caldara had joined Atalanta on loan from Milan until June 2021, with the option to buy for an undisclosed price. Three days later, he made his second post-return debut for Atalanta, playing for 77 minutes in a 1–0 away Coppa Italia loss against Fiorentina. On 19 February 2020, Caldara made his UEFA Champions League debut, playing for 75 minutes as a starter in a 4–1 home win against Valencia at the San Siro.

==== Loan to Venezia ====
On 9 August 2021, Caldara joined Venezia on loan with an option to buy. On 15 August, Caldara debuted for Venezia in a 1–1 draw against Frosinone in the first round of Coppa Italia, where Venezia won 8–7 at penalty shoot-out, with Caldara scoring from his kick.

==== Loan to Spezia ====
On 17 July 2022, Caldara joined Spezia on loan for the 2022–23 season.

==== 2023–24 season ====
Caldara, on a final year of his contract with Milan, began pre-season with the team on 10 July. He was left out of the squad for a friendly tournament in the United States, partially due to sprained ankle. Generally considered out of the club's senior team project by head coach Stefano Pioli and the board of directors, he was put on the transfer market immediately after his return. Despite some interest from Beşiktaş and Hellas Verona, no move materialized before closure of the summer transfer window on 1 September. Caldara was assigned number 30 shirt and included on the season's squad list for the Serie A and Coppa Italia competitions. In September, he also became a surprise inclusion on the team's squad list for the Champions League, mainly due to regulations that allow each club to register four homegrown players. However, just days before start of the competition, Caldara had a surgery on his right ankle, the recovery from which ruled him out for at least three months, which effectively made him miss all the group matches. On 12 February 2024, Caldara was reported to have completed his post-surgery rehabilitation and returned to training with the rest of the team. He, however, lost his place in the Milan's squad list for the 2023–24 UEFA Europa League knockout phase to new signing Filippo Terracciano.

On 25 May 2024, after almost six years since his transfer to AC Milan, Caldara played his first and the only game for the club in Serie A, coming on as a substitute for Matteo Gabbia in the second half of the eventual 3-3 draw against Salernitana at San Siro on the final matchday of the season. Following the game's conclusion, his departure alongside that of several other players as well as the manager Stefano Pioli, had been confirmed.

=== Modena ===
On 2 July 2024, Caldara signed a one-year contract with Serie B club Modena as a free agent. He made 27 appearances in the league, scoring and assisting once, as well as one appearance in the Coppa Italia. His contract was not extended upon expiration.

=== Retirement ===
On 15 November 2025, Caldara announced his retirement as a professional football player in the farewell letter published by Gianluca DiMarzio. In the contents, he cited his precarious ankle condition and inability to regain his pre-2018 form as major factors behind his decision to retire at just 31 years of age.

== International career ==
In June 2017, Caldara was included in the Italy under-21 squad for the 2017 UEFA European Under-21 Championship by manager Luigi Di Biagio. Italy were eliminated by Spain in the semi-finals on 27 June, following a 3–1 defeat.

Caldara made his senior international debut for Italy under Roberto Mancini in a 3–1 friendly loss to France in Nice on 1 June 2018.

== Style of play ==
Caldara is a tall and physically strong center back contributing defensively and offensively. Although capable of playing in a back four, he is most comfortable and confident in the middle of a back three, such as in 3–4–3 or 3–5–2 formations. At Atalanta, while playing under coach Gian Piero Gasperini, he was allowed to make occasional forward runs during the attacking play and be present at all set pieces, which helped him score 10 goals in just two seasons. Courtesy of his imposing physique, he finds himself at ease in aerial duels and headers. Tactically, Caldara has cited Alessandro Nesta as the biggest inspiration, in tribute of whom he had chosen 13 as his shirt number multiple times.

== Career statistics ==
=== Club ===
As of match played 25 May 2024

Appearances and goals by club, season and competition
Club	Season	League			Coppa Italia		Europe		Total	
Club	Season	Division	Apps	Goals	Apps	Goals	Apps	Goals	Apps	Goals
Atalanta	2013–14	Serie A	1	0	0	0	–		1	0
Trapani (loan)	2014–15	Serie B	20	2	1	0	–		21	2
Cesena (loan)	2015–16	Serie B	27	3	2	0	–		29	3
Atalanta	2016–17	Serie A	30	7	1	0	–		31	7
Atalanta	2017–18	Serie A	24	3	2	0	8 (Note: Appearances in UEFA Europa League)	0	34	3
Atalanta	Total		55	10	3	0	8	0	66	10
AC Milan	2018–19	Serie A	0	0	1	0	1	0	2	0
AC Milan	2019–20	Serie A	0	0	0	0	–		0	0
AC Milan	2023–24	Serie A	1	0	0	0	0	0	1	0
AC Milan	Total		1	0	1	0	1	0	3	0
Atalanta (loan)	2019–20	Serie A	14	0	1	0	3 (Note: Appearances in UEFA Champions League)	0	18	0
Atalanta (loan)	2020–21	Serie A	6	0	2	0	1	0	9	0
Atalanta (loan)	Total		20	0	3	0	4	0	27	0
Venezia (loan)	2021–22	Serie A	31	1	2	0	–		33	1
Spezia (loan)	2022–23	Serie A	18	0	2	0	–		20	0
Modena	2024–25	Serie B	26	1	1	0	-		27	1
Career total			200	17	15	0	13	0	228	17

=== International ===
As of match played 10 September 2018

Appearances and goals by national team and year
National team	Year	Apps	Goals
Italy	2018	2	0
Total		2	0

== Personal life ==
Caldara has been in a long-term relationship with Nicole Nessi, a local woman from his native city of Bergamo; the couple married on 7 June 2023. They have three sons; Alessandro (born 10 June 2020), Ludovico (born 1 August 2022), and Leonardo (born 3 October 2024).

In September 2018, Caldara enrolled in LUISS Sport Academy to earn a three-year bachelor's degree in economics and management.
