= Filippo Melegoni =

Italian footballer (born 1999)

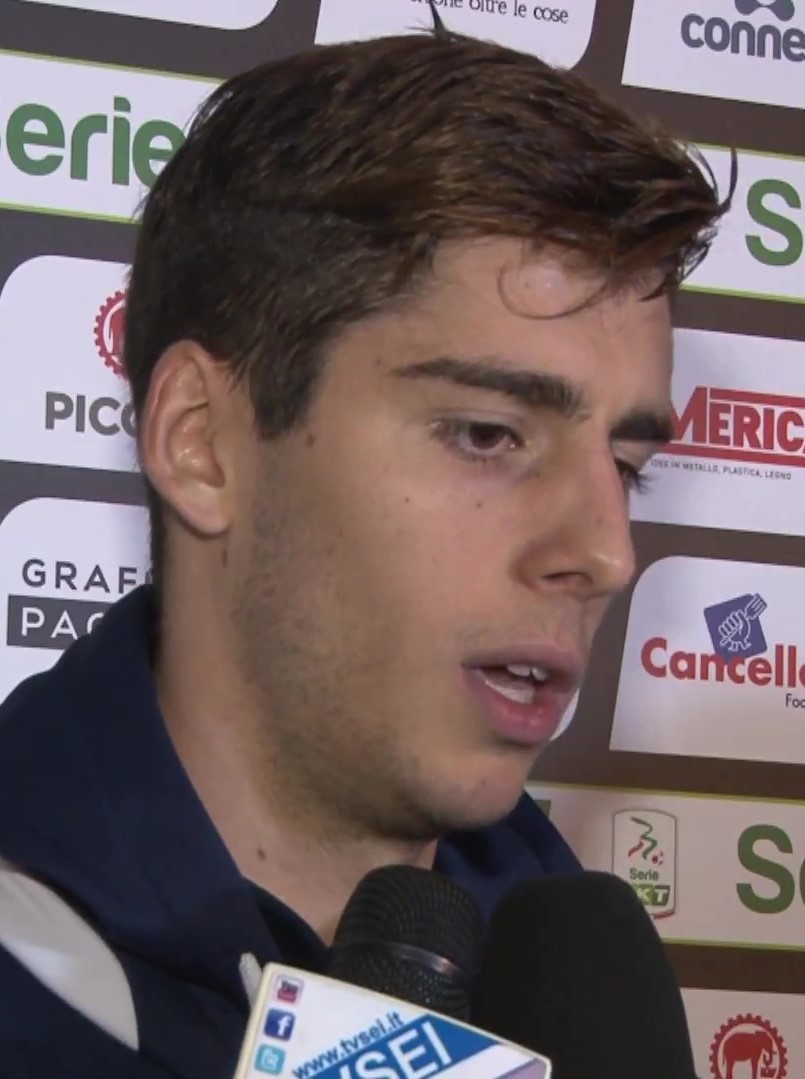
- Melegoni in 2018

Personal information
- Date of birth: 18 February 1999 (age 27)
- Place of birth: Bergamo, Italy
- Height: 1.88 m (6 ft 2 in)
- Position: Midfielder

Team information
- Current team: Juventus Next Gen
- Number: 72

Youth career
- Atalanta

Senior career*
Years	Team	Apps	(Gls)
2016–2022	Atalanta	1	(0)
2018–2020	→ Pescara (loan)	26	(1)
2020–2022	→ Genoa (loan)	39	(1)
2022–2025	Genoa	3	(0)
2022–2023	→ Standard Liège (loan)	27	(1)
2023–2024	→ Reggiana (loan)	28	(1)
2025–2026	Carrarese	37	(1)
2026–	Juventus Next Gen	4	(0)

International career^{‡}
2014	Italy U15	2	(0)
2014	Italy U16	4	(0)
2014–2016	Italy U17	29	(3)
2016–2018	Italy U19	28	(4)
2018–2019	Italy U20	7	(0)
2020	Italy U21	2	(1)
- * Club domestic league appearances and goals as of 13 May 2026 ‡ National team caps and goals as of 19:47, 18 November 2020 (UTC)

Filippo Melegoni (born 18 February 1999) is an Italian professional footballer who plays as a midfielder for Serie C Group B club Juventus Next Gen.

== Club career ==
=== Early career ===
Melegoni was born in Bergamo, Italy, and began his career at local Serie A side Atalanta. A midfielder, he states that his playing style is modelled on his childhood idols Zinedine Zidane and David Beckham.

=== Atalanta ===
Melegoni played at various age levels of the Atalanta youth sector, including making 24 appearances for the under-17 side, scoring six goals. He eventually began to play in the full Primavera side in 2016, and established himself as a mainstay in the centre of midfield. After being named on the Atalanta first-team bench for several games, Melegoni was placed in the starting line-up for the match against Sampdoria on 22 January 2017. He played the first half before being replaced at the interval, in an eventual 1–0 win.

==== Loan to Pescara ====
On 11 August 2018, Melegoni joined Serie B club Pescara on loan until 30 June 2019. On 23 July 2019, the loan was renewed for an additional year.

==== Loan to Genoa ====
On 16 September 2020, Melegoni joined Genoa on a two-year loan deal with a conditional obligation to buy.

=== Genoa ===
==== Loan to Standard Liège ====
In August 2022, Melegoni was loaned to Belgian club Standard Liège on a one-year long deal.

==== Loan to Reggiana ====
On 1 September 2023, Melegoni was loaned by Reggiana.

=== Carrarese ===
On 24 January 2025, Melegoni signed a two-and-a-half-year contract with Carrarese in Serie B.

=== Juventus Next Gen ===
On 1 September 2026, he transferred permanently to Juventus' reserve team, ahead of the 2026–27 season.

== International career ==
Melegoni has been capped by Italy at under-15, under-16, under-17 levels, and is a current member of the under-19 side. His first international call-up came in 2014 for a friendly match against Belgium. He progressed quickly up to the under-17 team, where he was eventually made captain. He also scored his first international goal whilst playing for Bruno Tedino's side, in a 3–1 loss against the Netherlands, and went on to make 29 appearances in total. He received his first call-up to the under-19 side, bypassing under-18 level, by Roberto Baronio for the match against Croatia. His first goal for the under-19 team came in his second game; a 2–1 loss against the Czech Republic.

On 3 September 2020, he made his debut with the Italy U21 side, scoring Italy's second goal in a 2–1 friendly home win against Slovenia.

== Career statistics ==
=== Club ===
As of match played 27 October 2024

Appearances and goals by club, season and competition
Club	Season	League			National Cup (Note: Includes Coppa Italia, Belgian Cup)		Europe		Other		Total	
Club	Season	Division	Apps	Goals	Apps	Goals	Apps	Goals	Apps	Goals	Apps	Goals
Atalanta	2016–17	Serie A	1	0	0	0	—				1	0
Pescara (loan)	2018–19	Serie B	13	1	0	0	—				13	1
Pescara (loan)	2019–20	Serie B	12	0	0	0	—		1 (Note: Appearance(s) in Serie B play-out)	0	13	0
Pescara (loan)	Total		25	1	0	0	—		1	0	26	1
Genoa (loan)	2020–21	Serie A	14	0	3	1	—				17	1
Genoa (loan)	2021–22	Serie A	25	1	2	0	—				27	1
Genoa	2022–23	Serie B	0	0	1	0	—				1	0
Genoa	2024–25	Serie A	3	0	—						3	0
Genoa	Total		42	1	6	1	—				48	2
Standard Liège (loan)	2022–23	Jupiler League	21	1	2	0	—		6 (Note: Appearance(s) in Jupiler League Europe Playoff)	0	29	1
Reggiana (loan)	2023–24	Serie B	28	1	1	0	—				29	1
Career total			117	4	9	1	—		7	0	133	5

== Honours ==
Italy U19

- UEFA European Under-19 Championship runner-up: 2018
