= 2012–13 Atalanta BC season =

Atalanta
2012–13 season
- Chairman: Antonio Percassi
- Manager: Stefano Colantuono
- Serie A: 15th
- Coppa Italia: Round of 16
- Top goalscorer: League: Germán Denis (15); All: Germán Denis (15)
Home colours	Away colours	Third colours

The 2012–13 season is Atalanta Bergamasca Calcio's hundred and fifth season in existence and the club's second consecutive season in the top flight of Italian football. The club was punished with a two-point deduction plus a €25,000 fine at the start of the season, due to involvement in the 2011–12 Italian football scandal.

== Players ==
=== Current squad ===
As of 29 September 2012

Note: Flags indicate national team as defined under FIFA eligibility rules; some limited exceptions apply. Players may hold more than one non-FIFA nationality.

No.	Pos.	Nation	Player
2	DF	ITA	Guglielmo Stendardo
3	DF	ITA	Stefano Lucchini
4	DF	ITA	Daniele Capelli
5	DF	ARG	Lionel Scaloni
6	DF	ITA	Gianpaolo Bellini (captain)
7	FW	CRO	Marko Livaja
8	MF	SRB	Ivan Radovanović
9	MF	AUS	James Troisi
10	MF	ITA	Giacomo Bonaventura
11	MF	ARG	Maxi Moralez
13	DF	ITA	Michele Canini
16	GK	ITA	Ciro Polito
17	MF	CHI	Carlos Carmona
18	MF	ITA	Luigi Giorgi (on loan from Novara)
19	FW	ARG	Germán Denis
20	FW	CRO	Igor Budan (on loan from Palermo)

No.	Pos.	Nation	Player
21	MF	ITA	Luca Cigarini (on loan from Napoli)
22	DF	ITA	Matteo Contini
23	MF	ITA	Franco Brienza
28	DF	ITA	Davide Brivio
32	DF	ITA	Michele Ferri
44	MF	ITA	Riccardo Cazzola
47	GK	ITA	Andrea Consigli
77	MF	ITA	Cristian Raimondi
78	GK	ITA	Giorgio Frezzolini
81	MF	ITA	Franco Brienza
83	DF	ITA	Cristiano Del Grosso
88	MF	ITA	Davide Biondini (on loan from Genoa)
89	FW	ITA	Guido Marilungo
91	FW	ITA	Giuseppe De Luca (on loan from Varese)
99	FW	ARG	Facundo Parra (on loan from (Argentina) Chacarita)

=== Transfers ===
- Only first players.

==== In ====
No.	Pos.	Nat.	Name	Age	EU	Moving from	Type	Transfer window	Ends	Transfer fee	Source
19	FW	(Argentina)	Germán Denis	30	EU	Udinese	Transfer ✓	Summer	2015	€2.35M	
44	MF	(Italy)	Riccardo Cazzola	26	EU	Juve Stabia	Transfer ✓	Summer	2015	€1M	
8	MF	(Serbia)	Ivan Radovanović	23	EU	Novara	Loan Return ✓	Summer	2014	Free	
21	MF	(Italy)	Luca Cigarini	26	EU	Napoli	Loan ✓	Summer	2013	Free	
28	DF	(Italy)	Davide Brivio	24	EU	Lecce	Transfer ✓	Summer	2017	€2.7M	
99	FW	(Argentina)	Facundo Parra	27	EU	Independiente (Argentina)	Loan ✓	Summer	2013	Free	
25	DF	(Argentina)	Carlos Matheu	27	EU	Independiente (Argentina)	Transfer ✓	Summer	2015	Free	
2	DF	(Italy)	Guglielmo Stendardo	31	EU	Lazio	Transfer ✓	Summer	2015	Free	
9	MF	(Australia)	James Troisi	24	EU	Juventus	Co-Ownership ✓	Summer	2016	€2M	
88	MF	(Italy)	Davide Biondini	29	EU	Genoa	Loan ✓	Summer	2013	Free	
91	FW	(Italy)	Giuseppe De Luca	20	EU	Varese	Loan ✓	Summer	2013	Free	
18	MF	(Italy)	Luigi Giorgi	25	EU	Novara	Loan ✓	Winter	2013	€200,000	
13	DF	(Italy)	Michele Canini	27	EU	Genoa	Swap ✓	Winter	2016	Free	
20	FW	(Croatia)	Igor Budan	32	EU	Palermo	Loan ✓	Winter	2013	Free	
7	FW	(Croatia)	Marko Livaja	19	EU	Internazionale	Co-Ownership ✓	Winter	2014	Free	
22	DF	(Italy)	Matteo Contini	32	EU	Siena	Transfer ✓	Winter	2014	Free	
83	DF	(Italy)	Cristiano Del Grosso	29	EU	Siena	Transfer ✓	Winter	2014	Free	
5	DF	(Argentina)	Lionel Scaloni	34	EU	Lazio	Transfer ✓	Winter	2013	€250,000	
81	MF	(Italy)	Franco Brienza	33	EU	Palermo	Transfer ✓	Winter	2014	Free	

Total spending: ▼€8,500,000

==== Out ====
No.	Pos.	Nat.	Name	Age	EU	Moving to	Type	Transfer window	Transfer fee	Source
33	MF	(Italy)	Matteo Brighi	31	EU	Roma	Loan Return ✓	Summer	Free	
18	MF	(Italy)	Alessandro Carrozza	30	EU	Varese	Loan Return ✓	Summer	Free	
63	FW	(Italy)	Matteo Ardemagni	25	EU	Modena	Loan ✓	Summer	Free	
88	MF	(Italy)	Nadir Minotti	20	EU	Virtus Lanciano	Loan ✓	Summer	Free	
28	FW	(Italy)	Manolo Gabbiadini	20	EU	Juventus	Co-Ownership ✓	Summer	€5.5M	
	MF	(Ivory Coast)	Moussa Koné	22	EU	Varese	Loan ✓	Summer	Free	
90	FW	(Italy)	Simone Tiribocchi	34	EU	Pro Vercelli	Transfer ✓	Summer	€400K	
20	MF	(Italy)	Massimo Mutarelli	34	EU	Free agent	Contract Rescinded ✓	Summer	Free	
13	DF	(Italy)	Federico Peluso	28	EU	Juventus	Loan ✓	Winter	Free	
5	DF	(Italy)	Thomas Manfredini	32	EU	Genoa	Swap ✓	Winter	Free	
23	MF	(Italy)	Matteo Scozzarella	24	EU	Ternana	Loan ✓	Winter	Free	
7	MF	(Italy)	Ezequiel Schelotto	23	EU	Internazionale	Transfer ✓	Winter	€3.8M	
79	MF	(Brazil)	Adriano Ferreira Pinto	33	EU	Varese	Transfer ✓	Winter	Free	
25	DF	(Argentina)	Carlos Matheu	27	EU	Siena	Loan ✓	Winter	Free	

Total gaining: ▲€9,700,000

== Competitions ==
=== Serie A ===
==== League table ====
Pos	Team	Pld	W	D	L	GF	GA	GD	Pts
13	Bologna	38	11	11	16	46	52	−6	44
14	Sampdoria	38	11	10	17	43	51	−8	42 (Note: Sampdoria and Torino were docked 1 point due to involvement in the 2011–12 Italian football scandal.)
15	Atalanta	38	11	9	18	39	56	−17	40 (Note: Atalanta was docked 2 points due to involvement in the 2011–12 Italian football scandal.)
16	Torino	38	8	16	14	46	55	−9	39
17	Genoa	38	8	14	16	38	52	−14	38

Source: Serie A, Soccerway
Rules for classification: 1st points; 2nd head-to-head points; 3rd head-to-head goal difference; 4th goal difference; 5th number of goals scored; 6th public draw.
(Head-to-head record is applied for clubs with the same number of points only once all matches between said clubs have been played)

==== Results summary ====
Overall								Home						Away					
Pld	W	D	L	GF	GA	GD	Pts	W	D	L	GF	GA	GD	W	D	L	GF	GA	GD
38	11	9	18	39	56	−17	42	6	6	7	19	24	−5	5	3	11	20	32	−12

Last updated: 19 May 2013.
Source: Competitive matches

==== Results by round ====
Round	1	2	3	4	5	6	7	8	9	10	11	12	13	14	15	16	17	18	19	20	21	22	23	24	25	26	27	28	29	30	31	32	33	34	35	36	37	38
Ground	H	A	A	H	A	H	A	H	A	H	A	H	A	H	A	H	A	H	A	A	H	H	A	H	A	H	A	H	A	H	A	H	A	H	A	H	A	H
Result	L	D	W	W	L	L	L	W	D	W	W	W	L	L	L	W	L	D	L	L	D	L	W	D	L	L	W	W	L	D	W	L	D	D	L	L	L	D
Position	19	19	15	9	12	16	19	13	15	10	9	6	8	10	11	10	12	11	12	13	13	14	13	14	15	16	15	14	16	16	13	13	14	14	14	15	15	15

Updated to match(es) played on 19 May 2013. Source: Competitive matches
A = Away; H = Home; W = Win; D = Draw; L = Loss

==== Matches ====
26 August 2012 1	Atalanta	0–1	Lazio	Bergamo
20:45 CEST (UTC+02:00)			Hernanes 17'	Stadium: Atleti Azzurri d'Italia; Referee: Andrea Gervasoni

2 September 2012 2	Cagliari	1–1	Atalanta	Quartu Sant'Elena
20:45 CEST (UTC+02:00)	Ekdal 90+1'		Peluso (yellow card) 12' (yellow-red card) 27'; Denis 81'	Stadium: Stadio Is Arenas; Referee: Sebastiano Peruzzo

15 September 2012 3	Milan	0–1	Atalanta	Milan
20:45 CEST (UTC+02:00)			Cigarini 64'	Stadium: San Siro; Referee: Daniele Orsato

23 September 2012 4	Atalanta	1–0	Palermo	Bergamo
15:00 CEST (UTC+02:00)	Raimondi 88'			Stadium: Stadio Atleti Azzurri d'Italia; Attendance: 13,467; Referee: Piero Giacomelli

26 September 2012 5	Catania	2–1	Atalanta	Catania
20:45 CEST (UTC+02:00)	Spolli 52'; Barrientos 64'		Moralez 50'	Stadium: Stadio Angelo Massimino; Attendance: 13,240; Referee: Massimiliano Irrati

30 September 2012 6	Atalanta	1–5	Torino	Bergamo
15:00 CEST (UTC+02:00)	Denis 28'		Bianchi 38' (pen.), 76'; Gazzi 62'; Stevanović 66'; D'Ambrosio 73'	Stadium: Stadio Atleti Azzurri d'Italia; Attendance: 15,000; Referee: Davide Massa

7 October 2012 7	Roma	2–0	Atalanta	Rome
12:30 CEST (UTC+02:00)	Lamela 30'; Bradley 62'			Stadium: Stadio Olimpico; Referee: Luca Banti

21 October 2012 8	Atalanta	2–1	Siena	Bergamo
15:00 CEST (UTC+02:00)	Cigarini 62'; Bonaventura 82'		Reginaldo 59'	Stadium: Stadio Atleti Azzurri d'Italia; Referee: Nicola Rizzoli

28 October 2012 9	Pescara	0–0	Atalanta	Pescara
15:00 CET (UTC+01:00)			Peluso (yellow card) 40' (yellow-red card) 47'	Stadium: Stadio Adriatico; Referee: Paolo Valeri

31 October 2012 10	Atalanta	1–0	Napoli	Bergamo
20:45 CET (UTC+01:00)	Carmona 19'			Stadium: Stadio Atleti Azzurri d'Italia; Referee: Daniele Orsato

4 November 2012 11	Sampdoria	1–2	Atalanta	Genoa
15:00 CET (UTC+01:00)	Maresca 53'		Bonaventura 2'; De Luca 76'	Stadium: Stadio Luigi Ferraris; Referee: Carmine Russo

11 November 2012 12	Atalanta	3–2	Internazionale	Bergamo
20:45 CET (UTC+01:00)	Bonaventura 9'; Denis 60', 67' (pen.)		Guarín 56'; Palacio 84'	Stadium: Stadio Atleti Azzurri d'Italia; Referee: Antonio Damato

18 November 2012 13	Fiorentina	4–1	Atalanta	Florence
15:00 CET (UTC+01:00)	Rodríguez 5'; Pizarro (yellow card) 25'; Aquilani 42', 45+2'; Toni 49'		Stendardo (yellow card) 19'; Bonaventura 32'; Cigarini (red card) 45+1'; Brivio (yellow card) 52'; Manfredini (yellow card) 56'; Cazzola (yellow card) 61'	Stadium: Stadio Artemio Franchi; Referee: Andrea De Marco

25 November 2012 14	Atalanta	0–1	Genoa	Bergamo
15:00 CET (UTC+01:00)	Bonaventura (yellow card) 45+1'		Janković (yellow card) 15'; Bertolacci 40'; Moretti (yellow card) 49' (yellow-red card) 87'; Borriello (yellow card) 53'	Stadium: Stadio Atleti Azzurri d'Italia; Referee: Daniele Doveri

2 December 2012 15	Bologna	2–1	Atalanta	Bologna
15:00 CET (UTC+01:00)	Diamanti 16'; Sørensen (yellow card) 27'; Gabbiadini 70', (yellow card) 79'		Stendardo (yellow card) 27'; Denis 50'; Bonaventura (yellow card) 54'; Peluso (yellow card) 73'; Cigarini (yellow card) 76'	Stadium: Stadio Renato Dall'Ara; Referee: Antonio Giannoccaro

8 December 2012 16	Atalanta	2–1	Parma	Bergamo
18:00 CET (UTC+01:00)	Denis 4'; Moralez (yellow card) 37'; Peluso 38', (yellow card) 48'; Radovanović (yellow card) 43'; De Luca (yellow card) 71'; Cigarini (yellow card) 82'		Amauri 45'; Zaccardo (yellow card) 63'; Lucarelli (yellow card) 87'	Stadium: Stadio Atleti Azzurri d'Italia; Attendance: 12,948; Referee: Gianpaolo Calvarese

16 December 2012 17	Juventus	3–0	Atalanta	Turin
15:00 CET (UTC+01:00)	Vučinić 2'; Pirlo 14'; Marchisio 27'		Manfredini (yellow card) 30' (yellow-red card) 32'	Stadium: Juventus Stadium; Attendance: 38,000; Referee: Davide Massa

22 December 2012 18	Atalanta	1–1	Udinese	Bergamo
15:00 CET (UTC+01:00)	Denis 40' (pen.); Carmona (yellow card) 47'; Moralez (yellow card) 64'		Danilo (yellow card) 7'; Muriel (yellow card) 29', (goal) 34'; Pinzi (yellow card) 31'; Domizzi (yellow card) 39'	Stadium: Stadio Atleti Azzurri d'Italia; Attendance: 15,000; Referee: Marco Guida

6 January 2013 19	Chievo	1–0	Atalanta	Verona
15:00 CET (UTC+01:00)	Cofie 37'; Dainelli (yellow card) 80'		Biondini (yellow card) 44'; Brivio (yellow card) 67'; Raimondi (yellow card) 76'	Stadium: Stadio Marc'Antonio Bentegodi; Attendance: 9,000; Referee: Maurizio Mariani

13 January 2013 20	Lazio	2–0	Atalanta	Rome
15:00 CET (UTC+01:00)	Candreva (yellow card) 29'; Floccari 67'; Ciani (yellow card) 75'; Brivio 77' (o.g.)		Stendardo (yellow card) 59'; Raimondi (yellow card) 68'; Cigarini (yellow card) 69'; De Luca (yellow card) 75'; Carmona (yellow card) 76' (yellow-red card) 83'	Stadium: Stadio Olimpico; Attendance: 30,000; Referee: Sebastiano Peruzzo

20 January 2013 21	Atalanta	1–1	Cagliari	Bergamo
15:00 CET (UTC+01:00)	Denis (yellow card) 32'; Stendardo 57'; Giorgi (yellow card) 67' (yellow-red card) 79'		Canini 2' (o.g.); Ekdal (yellow card) 30'; Avelar (yellow card) 78'	Stadium: Stadio Atleti Azzurri d'Italia; Attendance: 15,000; Referee: Paolo Tagliavento

27 January 2013 22	Atalanta	0–1	Milan	Bergamo
15:00 CET (UTC+01:00)	Brivio (yellow card) 49' (yellow-red card) 59'; Raimondi (yellow card) 55'; Consigli (yellow card) 78'; Biondini (yellow card) 84'; Carmona (yellow card) 88'		El Shaarawy 29'; Pazzini (yellow card) 55'; Montolivo (yellow card) 71'; Mexès (yellow card) 78'; Abbiati (yellow card) 90+1'	Stadium: Stadio Atleti Azzurri d'Italia; Attendance: 26,000; Referee: Andrea Gervasoni

3 February 2013 23	Palermo	1–2	Atalanta	Palermo
15:00 CET (UTC+01:00)	Formica (yellow card) 76'; Nélson 83'		Scaloni (yellow card) 21'; Radovanović (yellow card) 35'; Carmona 54'; Cazzola (yellow card) 68'; Denis 72'	Stadium: Stadio Renzo Barbera; Attendance: 17,000; Referee: Antonio Damato

10 February 2013 24	Atalanta	0–0	Catania	Bergamo
15:00 CET (UTC+01:00)	Scaloni (yellow card) 34'; Del Grosso (yellow card) 41'; Bonaventura (yellow card) 52'; Biondini (yellow card) 72'; Livaja (yellow card) 90'		Bergessio (yellow card) 41'; Álvarez (yellow card) 67'; Castro (yellow card) 90+2'	Stadium: Stadio Atleti Azzurri d'Italia; Attendance: 14,000; Referee: Davide Massa

17 February 2013 25	Torino	2–1	Atalanta	Turin
14:00 CET (UTC+01:00)	Cerci 42'; Gillet (yellow card) 74'; Birsa 87'		Carmona (yellow card) 52'; Del Grosso (yellow card) 67'; Cazzola (yellow card) 73'; Denis 75' (pen.)	Stadium: Stadio Olimpico di Torino; Attendance: 14,000; Referee: Mauro Bergonzi

24 February 2013 26	Atalanta	2–3	Roma	Bergamo
15:00 CET (UTC+01:00)	Livaja 9', 44'; Contini (yellow card) 61' (yellow-red card); Raimondi (yellow card) 80'; Carmona (yellow card) 85'		Marquinho 13'; Pjanić 34'; Torosidis 71', (yellow card) 90+2'	Stadium: Stadio Atleti Azzurri d'Italia; Attendance: 14,000; Referee: Andrea De Marco

3 March 2013 27	Siena	0–2	Atalanta	Siena
15:00 CET (UTC+01:00)			Bonaventura 3', 68'; Carmona (yellow card) 11'; Raimondi (yellow card) 19'	Stadium: Stadio Artemio Franchi–Montepaschi Arena; Attendance: 9,500; Referee: Paolo Tagliavento

10 March 2013 28	Atalanta	2–1	Pescara	Bergamo
15:00 CET (UTC+01:00)	Biondini (yellow card) 30'; Denis 34' (pen.), 67'; Stendardo (yellow card) 39'; Bonaventura (yellow card) 73'; De Luca (yellow card) 83'		D'Agostino 24', (yellow card) 39'; Sculli (yellow card) 90+4'	Stadium: Stadio Atleti Azzurri d'Italia; Attendance: 20,000; Referee: Domenico Celi

17 March 2013 29	Napoli	3–2	Atalanta	Naples
15:00 CET (UTC+01:00)	Cavani 4' (pen.), 65'; Behrami (yellow card) 45'; Pandev 81'; Insigne (yellow card) 90+4'		Giorgi (yellow card) 3'; Lucchini (yellow card) 30'; Cannavaro 31' (o.g.); Denis 73', (yellow card) 84'; Bonaventura (yellow card) 88'	Stadium: Stadio San Paolo; Attendance: 38,337; Referee: Paolo Valeri

30 March 2013 30	Atalanta	0–0	Sampdoria	Bergamo
15:00 CET (UTC+01:00)	Consigli (yellow card) 26'; Lucchini (yellow card) 53' (yellow-red card)		Berardi (yellow card) 26'; Éder (yellow card) 71'; Krstičić (yellow card) 86'	Stadium: Stadio Atleti Azzurri d'Italia; Attendance: 14,000; Referee: Andrea Romeo

7 April 2013 31	Internazionale	3–4	Atalanta	Milan
15:00 CEST (UTC+02:00)	Kovačić (yellow card) 5'; Rocchi 44'; Álvarez 57', 61'; Samuel (yellow card) 65'		Bonaventura 56'; Denis 65', 71', 77'; Scaloni (yellow card) 85'; Biondini (yellow card) 88'; Raimondi (red card) 90'	Stadium: San Siro; Attendance: 49,000; Referee: Andrea Gervasoni

14 April 2013 32	Atalanta	0–2	Fiorentina	Bergamo
15:00 CEST (UTC+02:00)	Stendardo (yellow card) 60'; Livaja (yellow card) 75'; Bonaventura (yellow card) 77'; Denis (red card) 90'		Sissoko (yellow card) 25'; Pizarro 61' (pen.); Pasqual (yellow card) 63'; Larrondo 72', (yellow card) 78'	Stadium: Stadio Atleti Azzurri d'Italia; Attendance: 17,100; Referee: Carmine Russo

21 April 2013 33	Genoa	1–1	Atalanta	Genoa
15:00 CEST (UTC+02:00)	Floro Flores 6', (yellow card) 24'; Bertolacci (yellow card) 15'; Manfredini (yellow card) 80'; Portanova (yellow card) 83'		Del Grosso 8'; Scaloni (yellow card) 18'; Biondini (yellow card) 25'; Livaja (yellow card) 46'; Lucchini (yellow card) 64'; Bonaventura (yellow card) 69'	Stadium: Stadio Luigi Ferraris; Attendance: 18,000; Referee: Antonio Giannoccaro

27 April 2013 34	Atalanta	1–1	Bologna	Bergamo
18:00 CEST (UTC+02:00)	Livaja (yellow card) 61'; Giorgi 67'		Garics (yellow card) 15'; Gilardino 76'; Morleo (yellow card) 84'	Stadium: Stadio Atleti Azzurri d'Italia; Attendance: 14,000; Referee: Maurizio Mariani

5 May 2013 35	Parma	2–0	Atalanta	Parma
15:00 CEST (UTC+02:00)	Ampuero (yellow card) 20'; Parolo (yellow card) 36', (goal) 44'; Lucarelli (yellow card) 42'; Biabiany 58', (yellow card) 59'		Ferri (yellow card) 52'	Stadium: Stadio Ennio Tardini; Attendance: 13,000; Referee: Piero Giacomelli

8 May 2013 36	Atalanta	0–1	Juventus	Bergamo
20:45 CEST (UTC+02:00)	Giorgi (yellow card) 50'; Stendardo (yellow card) 58'		Matri 18'; Pirlo (yellow card) 41'	Stadium: Stadio Atleti Azzurri d'Italia; Attendance: 14,000; Referee: Marco Guida

12 May 2013 37	Udinese	2–1	Atalanta	Udine
15:00 CEST (UTC+02:00)	Di Natale 42', 52'		De Luca 10'; Radovanović (yellow card) 50'	Stadium: Stadio Fruli; Attendance: 15,000; Referee: Nicola Rizzoli

19 May 2013 38	Atalanta	2–2	Chievo	Bergamo
15:00 CEST (UTC+02:00)	Stendardo 8', (yellow card) 86'; De Luca (yellow card) 16'; Lucchini (yellow card) 27'; Livaja (yellow card) 60'; Giorgi 85', (yellow card) 85'		Sardo (yellow card) 55'; Théréau 78', 90+3'	Stadium: Stadio Atleti Azzurri d'Italia; Attendance: 15,000; Referee: Federico La Penna

=== Coppa Italia ===
18 August 2012 Third round	Atalanta	2–0	Padova	Bergamo
20:45 CEST (UTC+02:00)	Bonaventura 23'; Brivio 30'	Report		Stadium: Stadio Atleti Azzurri d'Italia; Attendance: 4,000; Referee: Andrea Romeo

28 November 2012 Fourth round	Atalanta	3–1	Cesena	Bergamo
15:00 CET (UTC+01:00)	Parra 41', 82'; De Luca 62'	Report	Tonucci 30'	Stadium: Stadio Atleti Azzurri d'Italia; Attendance: 2,146; Referee: Davide Massa

11 December 2012 Round of 16	Roma	3–0	Atalanta	Rome
21:00	Pjanić 21', (yellow card) 23'; Osvaldo 31', (yellow card) 55' (yellow-red card) 56'; Destro 52'	Report	Raimondi (yellow card) 58'; Moralez (yellow card) 72'	Stadium: Stadio Olimpico; Attendance: 9,769; Referee: Carmine Russo

== Squad statistics ==
=== Appearances and goals ===
No.	Pos	Nat	Player	Total		Serie A		Coppa Italia	
No.	Pos	Nat	Player	Apps	Goals	Apps	Goals	Apps	Goals
Goalkeepers
16	GK	(Italy) ITA	Ciro Polito	5	0	3+1	0	1	0
47	GK	(Italy) ITA	Andrea Consigli	37	0	35	0	2	0
78	GK	(Italy) ITA	Giorgio Frezzolini	0	0	0	0	0	0
Defenders
2	DF	(Italy) ITA	Guglielmo Stendardo	32	2	29+3	2	0	0
3	DF	(Italy) ITA	Stefano Lucchini	24	0	19+2	0	3	0
4	DF	(Italy) ITA	Daniele Capelli	1	0	1	0	0	0
5	DF	(Argentina) ARG	Lionel Scaloni	7	0	6+1	0	0	0
6	DF	(Italy) ITA	Gianpaolo Bellini	12	0	10+1	0	1	0
13	DF	(Italy) ITA	Michele Canini	12	0	10+2	0	0	0
22	DF	(Italy) ITA	Matteo Contini	3	0	1+2	0	0	0
28	DF	(Italy) ITA	Davide Brivio	23	1	15+5	0	3	1
32	DF	(Italy) ITA	Michele Ferri	10	0	7+2	0	1	0
83	DF	(Italy) ITA	Cristiano Del Grosso	13	1	13	1	0	0
Midfielders
8	MF	(Serbia) SRB	Ivan Radovanović	17	0	8+8	0	1	0
9	MF	(Australia) AUS	James Troisi	8	0	2+4	0	1+1	0
10	MF	(Italy) ITA	Giacomo Bonaventura	36	8	31+4	7	1	1
11	MF	(Argentina) ARG	Maxi Moralez	31	1	26+3	1	2	0
17	MF	(Chile) CHI	Carlos Carmona	22	2	19+1	2	1+1	0
18	MF	(Italy) ITA	Luigi Giorgi	15	2	11+4	2	0	0
21	MF	(Italy) ITA	Luca Cigarini	30	2	26+1	2	3	0
23	MF	(Italy) ITA	Franco Brienza	6	0	3+3	0	0	0
44	MF	(Italy) ITA	Riccardo Cazzola	25	0	9+13	0	2+1	0
77	MF	(Italy) ITA	Cristian Raimondi	27	1	22+4	1	1	0
88	MF	(Italy) ITA	Davide Biondini	24	0	20+4	0	0	0
Forwards
7	FW	(Croatia) CRO	Marko Livaja	11	2	6+5	2	0	0
19	FW	(Argentina) ARG	Germán Denis	38	15	35+1	15	2	0
20	FW	(Croatia) CRO	Igor Budan	2	0	0+2	0	0	0
89	FW	(Italy) ITA	Guido Marilungo	3	0	0+2	0	1	0
91	FW	(Italy) ITA	Giuseppe De Luca	20	3	7+11	2	0+2	1
99	FW	(Italy) ITA	Facundo Parra	16	2	3+11	0	1+1	2
Players transferred out during the season
5	DF	(Italy) ITA	Thomas Manfredini	16	0	15	0	1	0
7	MF	(Italy) ITA	Ezequiel Schelotto	18	0	12+4	0	2	0
13	DF	(Italy) ITA	Federico Peluso	13	1	13	1	0	0
23	MF	(Italy) ITA	Matteo Scozzarella	5	0	0+3	0	1+1	0
25	DF	(Argentina) ARG	Carlos Matheu	6	0	1+3	0	2	0
79	MF	(Brazil) BRA	Adriano Ferreira Pinto	0	0	0	0	0	0

Last updated: 23 February 2013
Source: Competitions

=== Top scorers ===
This includes all competitive matches. The list is sorted by shirt number when total goals are equal.

R	No.	Pos	Nat	Name	Serie A	Coppa Italia	Total
1	19	FW	(Argentina)	Germán Denis	15	0	15
2	10	MF	(Italy)	Giacomo Bonaventura	7	1	8
3	91	FW	(Italy)	Giuseppe De Luca	2	1	3
4	2	DF	(Italy)	Guglielmo Stendardo	2	0	2
=	7	FW	(Croatia)	Marko Livaja	2	0	2
=	17	MF	(Chile)	Carlos Carmona	2	0	2
=	18	MF	(Italy)	Luigi Giorgi	2	0	2
=	21	MF	(Italy)	Luca Cigarini	2	0	2
=	99	FW	(Argentina)	Facundo Parra	0	2	2
10				Own Goals	1	0	1
=	11	MF	(Argentina)	Maxi Moralez	1	0	1
=	13	DF	(Italy)	Federico Peluso	1	0	1
=	28	DF	(Italy)	Davide Brivio	0	1	1
=	77	MF	(Italy)	Cristian Raimondi	1	0	1
=	83	DF	(Italy)	Cristiano Del Grosso	1	0	1
