= 2013–14 Atalanta BC season =

Atalanta
2013–14 season
- President: Antonio Percassi
- Manager: Stefano Colantuono
- Stadium: Stadio Atleti Azzurri d'Italia
- Serie A: 11th
- Coppa Italia: Round of 16
- Top goalscorer: League: Germán Denis (11); All: Germán Denis (11)
- Highest home attendance: 20,140 vs Juventus (22 December 2012)
- Lowest home attendance: 3,000 vs Sassuolo (4 December 2012)
- Average home league attendance: 12,724
Home colours	Away colours	Third colours

The 2013–14 season was Atalanta Bergamasca Calcio's 106th season in existence and the club's third consecutive season in the top flight of Italian football.

== Players ==
=== Squad information ===
As of 6 March 2014

No.	Name	Pos.	Nat.	Place of Birth	Date of Birth (Age)	Club caps	Club goals	Int. apps	Int. goals	Signed from	Date signed	Fee	Contract End
Goalkeepers
37	Marco Sportiello	GK	(Italy)	Desio	10 May 1992 (age 34)	3	0	–	–	Youth System	22 June 2012	Free	30 June 2016
47	Andrea Consigli	GK	(Italy)	Cormano	27 January 1987 (age 39)	190	0	–	–	Youth System	1 July 2004	Free	30 June 2016
78	Giorgio Frezzolini	GK	(Italy)	Rome	21 January 1976 (age 50)	7	0	–	–	Ascoli	25 January 2010	Free	30 June 2014
Defenders
2	Guglielmo Stendardo	CB	(Italy)	Naples	6 May 1981 (age 45)	73	4	–	–	Lazio	9 August 2012	Free	30 June 2015
3	Stefano Lucchini	CB	(Italy)	Codogno	2 October 1980 (age 46)	65	1	–	–	Sampdoria	13 July 2011	Undisc.	30 June 2014
4	Lionel Scaloni	RB/RWB	(Argentina)	Rosario	16 May 1978 (age 48)	12	0	7	0	Lazio	29 January 2013	€0.25M	30 June 2014
6	Gianpaolo Bellini (c)	LB	(Italy)	Sarnico	27 March 1980 (age 46)	362	8	–	–	Youth System	1 July 1997	Free	30 June 2014
15	Mattia Caldara	CB	(Italy)	Bergamo	5 May 1994 (age 32)	–	–	–	–	Youth System	1 November 2013	Free	30 June 2016
27	Cristiano Del Grosso	CB	(Italy)	Giulianova	24 March 1983 (age 43)	27	1	–	–	Siena	31 January 2013	Swap	31 June 2014
28	Davide Brivio	LB	(Italy)	Milan	17 March 1988 (age 38)	41	4	–	–	Lecce	6 July 2012	€2.7M	30 June 2017
29	Yohan Benalouane	CB/RB	(France)	Bagnols-sur-Cèze	28 March 1987 (age 39)	10	0	9	1	Parma	3 January 2014	Loan	30 June 2014
33	Mario Yepes	CB	(Colombia)	Cali	13 January 1976 (age 50)	19	0	95	6	Milan	17 July 2013	Free	30 June 2014
93	Constantin Nica	RB	(Romania)	Afumați	18 March 1993 (age 33)	5	0	2	0	Dinamo București (Romania)	11 July 2013	€1.6M	30 June 2018
Midfielders
5	Luigi Giorgi	RW/AM	(Italy)	Ascoli	19 April 1987 (age 39)	17	2	–	–	Novara	9 July 2013	€0.8M	30 June 2016
8	Giulio Migliaccio	CM/DM	(Italy)	Mugnano di Napoli	23 June 1981 (age 45)	18	0	–	–	Palermo	11 July 2013	Free	30 June 2015
10	Giacomo Bonaventura	CM/AM	(Italy)	San Severino Marche	22 August 1989 (age 37)	123	21	1	0	Youth System	1 April 2008	Free	30 June 2017
11	Maxi Moralez	AM/SS	(Argentina)	Granadero Baigorria	27 February 1987 (age 39)	93	13	1	0	Vélez (Argentina)	27 July 2011	€8M	30 June 2015
17	Carlos Carmona	CM/DM	(Chile)	Coquimbo	21 February 1987 (age 39)	108	4	38	1	Reggina	27 August 2010	€1.8M	30 June 2014
18	Daniele Baselli	CM	(Italy)	Brescia	12 March 1992 (age 34)	20	0	–	–	Cittadella	20 June 2013	€0.8M	30 June 2018
20	Marcelo Estigarribia	AM/LM	(Paraguay)	Fernando de la Mora	21 September 1987 (age 39)	2	0	32	1	Maldonado (Uruguay)	30 January 2014	Loan	30 June 2014
21	Luca Cigarini	CM	(Italy)	Montecchio Emilia	20 June 1986 (age 40)	112	8	–	–	Napoli	5 July 2013	€2.2M	30 June 2015
44	Riccardo Cazzola	CM	(Italy)	Verona	10 August 1985 (age 41)	44	0	–	–	Juve Stabia	20 July 2012	€1M	30 June 2015
77	Cristian Raimondi	RM/RB	(Italy)	San Giovanni Bianco	30 April 1981 (age 45)	89	1	–	–	Livorno	7 August 2010	€1M	30 June 2015
90	Moussa Koné	CM	(Ivory Coast)	Anyama	12 February 1990 (age 36)	10	1	1	1	Youth System	1 July 2010	Free	30 June 2017
92	Gianluca Barba	LW/LB	(Italy)	Fiorenzuola	27 February 1995 (age 31)	1	0	–	–	Youth System	1 December 2013	Free	30 June 2014
94	Frederico Varano	CM/AM	(Italy)	Vigevano	21 January 1995 (age 31)	–	–	–	–	Youth System	1 December 2013	Free	30 June 2016
95	Joakim Olausson	CM	(Sweden)	Gothenburg	14 January 1995 (age 31)	–	–	–	–	Youth System	1 December 2013	Free	30 June 2016
96	Mario Pugliese	CM/RM	(Italy)	San Giorgio a Cremano	23 June 1996 (age 30)	1	0	–	–	Youth System	1 December 2013	Free	30 June 2016
Forwards
7	Marko Livaja	SS/RW	(Croatia)	Split	26 August 1993 (age 33)	29	6	–	–	Inter	31 January 2013	Undisc.	30 June 2015
9	Rubén Bentancourt	ST	(Uruguay)	Salto	2 March 1993 (age 33)	0	0	–	–	Jong PSV (Netherlands)	31 January 2014	€1.5M	30 June 2017
19	Germán Denis	ST	(Argentina)	Remedios de Escalada	10 September 1981 (age 45)	98	40	5	0	Udinese	18 July 2012	€2.35M	30 June 2015
23	Franco Brienza	SS/AM	(Italy)	Cantù	19 March 1979 (age 47)	21	0	2	0	Palermo	31 January 2013	Free	30 June 2014
91	Giuseppe De Luca	SS/ST	(Italy)	Angera	11 October 1991 (age 35)	33	7	–	–	Varese	18 June 2013	Undisc.	30 June 2017
97	Giacomo Parigi	SS/ST	(Italy)	Arezzo	17 June 1996 (age 30)	–	–	–	–	Arezzo	1 December 2013	Loan	30 June 2014

=== Transfers ===
- Only first players.

==== In ====
No.	Pos.	Nat.	Name	Age	EU	Moving from	Type	Transfer window	Ends	Transfer fee	Source
91	FW	(Italy)	Giuseppe De Luca	21	EU	Varese	Transfer ✓	Summer	2017	Undisclosed	
18	MF	(Italy)	Daniele Baselli	21	EU	Cittadella	Co-Ownership ✓	Summer	2018	€0.8M	
90	MF	(Ivory Coast)	Moussa Koné	23	EU	Varese	Loan Return ✓	Summer	2017	Free	
25	DF	(Argentina)	Carlos Matheu	28	EU	Siena	Loan Return ✓	Summer	2015	Free	
63	FW	(Italy)	Matteo Ardemagni	26	EU	Modena	Loan Return ✓	Summer	2014	Free	
21	MF	(Italy)	Luca Cigarini	26	EU	Napoli	Co-Ownership ✓	Summer	2015	€2.2M	
18	MF	(Italy)	Luigi Giorgi	26	EU	Novara	Transfer ✓	Summer	2016	€800K	
8	MF	(Italy)	Giulio Migliaccio	32	EU	Palermo	Transfer ✓	Summer	2015	Undisclosed	
93	DF	(Romania)	Constantin Nica	20	EU	Dinamo București (Romania)	Transfer ✓	Summer	2018	€1.6M	
33	DF	(Colombia)	Mario Yepes	37	EU	Milan	Transfer ✓	Summer	2014	Free	
20	MF	(Paraguay)	Marcelo Estigarribia	26	EU	Deportivo Maldonado (Uruguay)	Loan ✓	Winter	2014	Free	
29	DF	(France)	Yohan Benalouane	26	EU	Parma	Loan ✓	Winter	2014	Free	
9	FW	(Uruguay)	Rubén Bentancourt	20	EU	Jong PSV (Netherlands)	Transfer ✓	Winter	2017	€1.5M	

Total spending: ▼€6,900,000

==== Out ====
No.	Pos.	Nat.	Name	Age	EU	Moving to	Type	Transfer window	Transfer fee	Source
13	DF	(Italy)	Federico Peluso	29	EU	Juventus	Transfer ✓	Summer	€4.8M	
99	FW	(Argentina)	Facundo Parra	28	EU	Chacarita Juniors (Argentina)	Loan Return ✓	Summer	Free	
20	FW	(Croatia)	Igor Budan	33	EU	Palermo	Loan Return ✓	Summer	Free	
88	MF	(Italy)	Davide Biondini	29	EU	Genoa	Loan Return ✓	Summer	Free	
32	DF	(Italy)	Michele Ferri	32	EU	Free agent	Released ✓	Summer	Free	
	FW	(Italy)	Manolo Gabbiadini	20	EU	Juventus	Co-Ownership ✓	Summer	€5.5M	
8	MF	(Serbia)	Ivan Radovanović	23	EU	Chievo	Transfer ✓	Summer	Undisclosed	
89	FW	(Italy)	Guido Marilungo	24	EU	Cesena	Loan ✓	Winter	Free	
13	DF	(Italy)	Michele Canini	28	EU	Chievo	Loan ✓	Winter	Free	
16	GK	(Italy)	Ciro Polito	33	EU	Sassuolo	Transfer ✓	Winter	Free	
61	MF	(Italy)	Roberto Gagliardini	19	EU	Cesena	Loan ✓	Winter	Free	
89	FW	(Italy)	Guido Marilungo	24	EU	Cesena	Loan ✓	Winter	Free	

Total gaining: ▲€10,300,000

== Competitions ==
=== Serie A ===
==== League table ====
Pos	Team	Pld	W	D	L	GF	GA	GD	Pts
9	Lazio	38	15	11	12	54	54	0	56
10	Hellas Verona	38	16	6	16	62	68	−6	54
11	Atalanta	38	15	5	18	43	51	−8	50
12	Sampdoria	38	12	9	17	48	62	−14	45
13	Udinese	38	12	8	18	46	57	−11	44 (Note: Udinese finished ahead of Genoa on head-to-head away goals scored: Udinese 1-0 Genoa, Udinese 3-3 Genoa.)

Source: Serie A, Soccerway
Rules for classification: 1st points; 2nd head-to-head points; 3rd head-to-head goal difference; 4th goal difference; 5th number of goals scored; 6th public draw.
(Head-to-head record is applied for clubs with the same number of points only once all matches between said clubs have been played)

==== Results summary ====
Overall								Home						Away					
Pld	W	D	L	GF	GA	GD	Pts	W	D	L	GF	GA	GD	W	D	L	GF	GA	GD
38	15	5	18	43	51	−8	50	11	3	5	28	22	+6	4	2	13	15	29	−14

Last updated: 18 May 2014.
Source: Competitive matches

==== Results by round ====
Round	1	2	3	4	5	6	7	8	9	10	11	12	13	14	15	16	17	18	19	20	21	22	23	24	25	26	27	28	29	30	31	32	33	34	35	36	37	38
Ground	A	H	A	H	A	H	A	H	A	H	A	H	A	H	A	A	H	A	H	H	A	H	A	H	A	H	A	H	A	H	A	H	A	H	H	A	H	A
Result	L	W	L	L	L	W	W	W	L	D	L	W	L	D	L	D	L	L	W	W	L	W	L	L	D	W	W	W	W	W	W	L	L	L	D	L	W	L
Position	12	9	13	15	17	13	11	7	9	9	9	9	10	11	13	13	15	15	13	12	12	12	13	14	14	13	13	9	8	7	7	8	11	11	11	11	11	11

Updated to match(es) played on 18 May 2014. Source: Competitive matches
A = Away; H = Home; W = Win; D = Draw; L = Loss

==== Matches ====
25 August 2013 1	Cagliari	2–1	Atalanta	Trieste
20:45	Nainggolan 28'; Cabrera 63'		Stendardo 27'	Stadium: Stadio Nereo Rocco; Attendance: 8,500; Referee: Massimiliano Irrati

1 September 2013 2	Atalanta	2–0	Torino	Bergamo
20:45	Stendardo 57'; Lucchini 81'			Stadium: Stadio Atleti Azzurri d'Italia; Attendance: 12,745; Referee: Mauro Bergonzi

14 September 2013 3	Napoli	2–0	Atalanta	Naples
20:45	Higuaín 71'; Callejón 81'			Stadium: Stadio San Paolo; Attendance: 40,000; Referee: Gianluca Rocchi

22 September 2013 4	Atalanta	0–2	Fiorentina	Bergamo
15:00			Fernández 41'; Rossi 69'	Stadium: Stadio Atleti Azzurri d'Italia; Attendance: 15,000; Referee: Antonio Damato

25 September 2013 5	Parma	4–3	Atalanta	Parma
19:45	Mesbah 19'; Parolo 28', 40'; Rosi 35'		Bonaventura 20'; Denis 44'; Livaja 79'	Stadium: Stadio Ennio Tardini; Attendance: 12,000; Referee: Andrea Gervasoni

29 September 2013 6	Atalanta	2–0	Udinese	Bergamo
14:00	Denis 45+1', 63'			Stadium: Stadio Atleti Azzurri d'Italia; Attendance: 15,000; Referee: Piero Giacomelli

5 October 2013 7	Chievo	0–1	Atalanta	Verona
17:00			Moralez 16'	Stadium: Stadio Marc'Antonio Bentegodi; Attendance: 11,000; Referee: Daniele Doveri

20 October 2013 8	Atalanta	2–1	Lazio	Bergamo
12:30	Cigarini 42'; Denis 84'		Perea 53'	Stadium: Stadio Atleti Azzurri d'Italia; Attendance: 12,127; Referee: Carmine Russo

26 October 2013 9	Sampdoria	1–0	Atalanta	Genoa
17:00	Mustafi 57'			Stadium: Stadio Luigi Ferraris; Attendance: 10,000; Referee: Massimiliano Irrati

29 October 2013 10	Atalanta	1–1	Internazionale	Bergamo
20:45	Denis 25'		Álvarez 16'	Stadium: Stadio Atleti Azzurri d'Italia; Attendance: 14,000; Referee: Nicola Rizzoli

3 November 2013 11	Livorno	1–0	Atalanta	Livorno
12:30	Paulinho 11'			Stadium: Armando Picchi; Attendance: 8,673; Referee: Carmine Russo

10 November 2013 12	Atalanta	2–1	Bologna	Bergamo
15:00	Brivio 74'; Livaja 90+3'		Bianchi 77'	Stadium: Stadio Atleti Azzurri d'Italia; Attendance: 12,511; Referee: Daniele Doveri

24 November 2013 13	Sassuolo	2–0	Atalanta	Reggio Emilia
14:00	Zaza 63'; Berardi 67'			Stadium: Stadio Citta del Tricolore; Attendance: 9.967; Referee: Paolo Valeri

1 December 2013 14	Atalanta	1–1	Roma	Bergamo
14:00	Brivio 51'		90' Strootman	Stadium: Stadio Atleti Azzurri d'Italia; Attendance: 15.362; Referee: Antonio Damato

8 December 2013 15	Verona	2–1	Atalanta	Verona
14:00	Juanito 82'; Jorginho 87' (pen.)		Denis 42'	Stadium: Stadio Marc'Antonio Bentegodi; Attendance: 17,801; Referee: Andrea De Marco

15 December 2013 16	Genoa	1–1	Atalanta	Genoa
15:00	Bertolacci 72'		90+4' De Luca	Stadium: Stadio Luigi Ferraris; Attendance: 19.000; Referee: Luca Banti

22 December 2013 17	Atalanta	1–4	Juventus	Bergamo
14:00	Moralez 15'		6' Tevez; 46' Pogba; 75' Llorente; 79' Vidal	Stadium: Stadio Atleti Azzurri d'Italia; Attendance: 20.140; Referee: Domenico Celi

6 January 2014 18	Milan	3–0	Atalanta	Milan
14:00	Kaká 35', 65'; Cristante 67'			Stadium: San Siro; Attendance: 34.187; Referee: Sebastiano Peruzzo

12 January 2013 19	Atalanta	2–1	Catania	Bergamo
14:00	Denis 67'; Moralez 86'		89' Leto	Stadium: Stadio Atleti Azzurri d'Italia; Attendance: 15.806; Referee: Davide Massa

19 January 2014 20	Atalanta	1–0	Cagliari	Bergamo
14:00	Bonaventura 68'			Stadium: Stadio Atleti Azzurri d'Italia; Attendance: 16.041; Referee: Maurizio Mariani

26 January 2014 21	Torino	1–0	Atalanta	Turin
14:00	Cerci 60' (pen.)			Stadium: Stadio Olimpico di Torino; Attendance: 16.000; Referee: Paolo Tagliavento

2 February 2014 22	Atalanta	3–0	Napoli	Bergamo
14:00	Denis 47', 64'; Moralez 70'			Stadium: Stadio Atleti Azzurri d'Italia; Attendance: 12.503; Referee: Nicola Rizzoli

9 February 2014 23	Fiorentina	2–0	Atalanta	Florence
14:00	Iličić 16'; Wolski 86'			Stadium: Stadio Artemio Franchi; Attendance: 28.319; Referee: Marco Guida

16 February 2014 24	Atalanta	0–4	Parma	Bergamo
14:00			9' Molinaro; 74' (o.g.) Benalouane; 77' Cassano; 90+3' Schelotto	Stadium: Stadio Atleti Azzurri d'Italia; Attendance: 11.233; Referee: Dino Tommasi

23 February 2014 25	Udinese	1–1	Atalanta	Udine
14:00	Di Natale 71' (pen.)		24' Brivio	Stadium: Stadio Friuli; Attendance: 11.000; Referee: Marco Di Bello

2 March 2014 26	Atalanta	2–1	Chievo	Bergamo
14:00	Carmona 21'; Cigarini 85'		72' Dainelli	Stadium: Stadio Atleti Azzurri d'Italia; Attendance: 12.091; Referee: Domenico Celi

9 March 2014 27	Lazio	0–1	Atalanta	Rome
14:00			60' Moralez	Stadium: Stadio Olimpico; Attendance: 4.000; Referee: Sebastiano Peruzzo

16 March 2014 28	Atalanta	3–0	Sampdoria	Bergamo
11:00	Carmona 36'; Bonaventura 42'; Denis 55'			Stadium: Stadio Atleti Azzurri d'Italia; Referee: Angelo Cervellera

23 March 2014 29	Inter	1–2	Atalanta	Milan
14:00	Icardi 36'		35', 90' Bonaventura	Stadium: San Siro; Attendance: 39.098; Referee: Piero Giacomelli

26 March 2014 30	Atalanta	2–0	Livorno	Bergamo
19:45	De Luca 22'; Denis 59'			Stadium: Stadio Atleti Azzurri d'Italia; Attendance: 12.991; Referee: Andrea De Marco

29 March 2014 31	Bologna	0–2	Atalanta	Bologna
17:00			22' De Luca; 26' Estigarribia	Stadium: Stadio Renato Dall'Ara; Referee: Paolo Valeri

6 April 2014 32	Atalanta	0–2	Sassuolo	Bergamo
14:00			33', 71' Sansone	Stadium: Stadio Atleti Azzurri d'Italia; Referee: Daniele Orsato

12 April 2014 33	Roma	3–1	Atalanta	Rome
20:45	Taddei 13'; Ljajić 44'; Gervinho 63'		Stendardo (yellow card) 6'; Cigarini (yellow card) 32'; Estigarribia (yellow card) 67'; Migliaccio 78'	Stadium: Stadio Olimpico; Attendance: 41,366; Referee: (Italy) Marco Guida

19 April 2014 34	Atalanta	1–2	Hellas Verona	Bergamo
14:00	Benalouane (yellow card) 27'; Yepes (yellow card) 35'; Livaja (yellow card) 48'; Carmona (yellow card) 68'; Denis 87'		Donati 53'; Cirigliano (yellow card) 68'; Toni 72'; Donsah (yellow card) 77'	Stadium: Stadio Atleti Azzurri d'Italia; Attendance: 14,000; Referee: (Italy) Daniele Minelli

27 April 2014 35	Atalanta	1–1	Genoa	Bergamo
20:45	Bonaventura (yellow card) 11'; Cigarini (yellow card) 43'; De Luca 82'		Marchese (yellow card) 12'; De Ceglie 27'; Antonini (yellow card) 30'; Portanova (red card) 50'; Gilardino (yellow card) 81'; Perin (yellow card) 87'	Stadium: Stadio Atleti Azzurri d'Italia; Attendance: 14,000; Referee: Sebastino Peruzzo

5 May 2014 36	Juventus	1–0	Atalanta	Turin
21:00	Padoin 72'		Estigarribia (yellow card) 71'	Stadium: Juventus Stadium; Attendance: 38,000; Referee: Andrea De Marco

11 May 2014 37	Atalanta	2–1	Milan	Bergamo
12:30	Denis 68' (pen.); Raimondi (yellow card) 69'; Migliaccio (yellow card) 85'; Brienza 90+6'		Bellini 51' (o.g.); Mexès (yellow card) 69'; Taarabt (yellow card) 90+3'	Stadium: Stadio Atleti Azzurri d'Italia; Attendance: 14,000; Referee: Nicola Rizzoli

18 May 2014 38	Catania	2–1	Atalanta	Catania
15:00	Izco (yellow card) 64'; Lodi 65'; Bergessio 90+2' (pen.)		Koné (yellow card) 29' (goal) 80'; Cigarini (yellow card) 52'	Stadium: Stadio Angelo Massimino; Attendance: 12,380; Referee: Gianluca Aureliano

=== Coppa Italia ===
18 August 2013 Third round	Atalanta	3–0	Bari	Bergamo
18:00	Livaja 7', 31'; De Luca 75'			Stadium: Stadio Atleti Azzurri d'Italia; Attendance: 4,467; Referee: Dino Tommasi

4 December 2013 Fourth round	Atalanta	2–0	Sassuolo	Bergamo
18:00	Koné 54'; De Luca 72'			Stadium: Stadio Atleti Azzurri d'Italia; Attendance: 3.000; Referee: Leonardo Baracani

15 January 2014 Round of 16	Napoli	3–1	Atalanta	Naples
20:00	Callejón 15', 80'; Insigne 72'		13' De Luca	Stadium: Stadio San Paolo; Attendance: 35.000; Referee: Andrea De Marco

== Statistics ==
=== Appearances and goals ===
No.	Pos	Nat	Player	Total		Serie A		Coppa Italia	
No.	Pos	Nat	Player	Apps	Goals	Apps	Goals	Apps	Goals
Goalkeepers
37	GK	(Italy) ITA	Marco Sportiello	3	-1	2	-1	1	0
47	GK	(Italy) ITA	Andrea Consigli	31	-40	30	-40	1	0
78	GK	(Italy) ITA	Giorgio Frezzolini	0	0	0	0	0	0
Defenders
2	DF	(Italy) ITA	Guglielmo Stendardo	29	2	27	2	1+1	0
3	DF	(Italy) ITA	Stefano Lucchini	18	1	12+5	1	1	0
4	DF	(Argentina) ARG	Lionel Scaloni	5	0	4+1	0	0	0
6	DF	(Italy) ITA	Gianpaolo Bellini	6	0	5+1	0	0	0
27	DF	(Italy) ITA	Cristiano Del Grosso	19	0	17+1	0	1	0
28	DF	(Italy) ITA	Davide Brivio	19	3	18+1	3	0	0
29	DF	(France) FRA	Yohan Benalouane	13	0	12	0	1	0
33	DF	(Colombia) COL	Mario Yepes	24	0	19+3	0	2	0
92	DF	(Italy) ITA	Gianluca Barba	1	0	0	0	1	0
93	DF	(Romania) ROU	Constantin Nica	8	0	2+3	0	3	0
Midfielders
5	MF	(Italy) ITA	Luigi Giorgi	2	0	0+1	0	1	0
8	MF	(Italy) ITA	Giulio Migliaccio	19	1	12+5	1	2	0
10	MF	(Italy) ITA	Giacomo Bonaventura	27	5	25+2	5	0	0
11	MF	(Argentina) ARG	Maxi Moralez	29	5	23+5	5	1	0
17	MF	(Chile) CHI	Carlos Carmona	30	2	27+2	2	1	0
18	MF	(Italy) ITA	Daniele Baselli	26	0	9+14	0	2+1	0
20	MF	(Paraguay) PAR	Marcelo Estigarribia	9	1	7+2	1	0	0
21	MF	(Italy) ITA	Luca Cigarini	32	2	25+4	2	1+2	0
44	MF	(Italy) ITA	Riccardo Cazzola	7	0	2+4	0	1	0
77	MF	(Italy) ITA	Cristian Raimondi	26	0	22+3	0	1	0
90	MF	(Ivory Coast) CIV	Moussa Koné	8	1	4+3	0	1	1
96	MF	(Italy) ITA	Mario Pugliese	1	0	0	0	1	0
Forwards
7	FW	(Croatia) CRO	Marko Livaja	22	4	7+12	2	3	2
9	FW	(Uruguay) URU	Rubén Bentancourt	1	0	0+1	0	0	0
19	FW	(Argentina) ARG	Germán Denis	33	11	31+1	11	1	0
23	MF	(Italy) ITA	Franco Brienza	16	0	7+9	0	0	0
91	FW	(Italy) ITA	Giuseppe De Luca	18	6	6+9	3	1+2	3
Players transferred out during the season
13	DF	(Italy) ITA	Michele Canini	9	0	7+1	0	0+1	0
16	GK	(Italy) ITA	Ciro Polito	1	-3	0	0	1	-3
61	MF	(Italy) ITA	Roberto Gagliardini	1	0	0	0	1	0
81	FW	(Italy) ITA	Guido Marilungo	9	0	0+6	0	1+2	0

Last updated: 6 April 2013
Source: Competitions

=== Top scorers ===
This includes all competitive matches. The list is sorted by shirt number when total goals are equal.

R	No.	Pos	Nat	Name	Serie A	Coppa Italia	Total
1	19	FW	(Argentina)	Germán Denis	11	0	11
2	91	FW	(Italy)	Giuseppe De Luca	3	3	6
3	10	MF	(Italy)	Giacomo Bonaventura	5	0	5
=	11	MF	(Argentina)	Maxi Moralez	5	0	5
5	7	FW	(Croatia)	Marko Livaja	2	2	4
6	28	DF	(Italy)	Davide Brivio	3	0	3
7	2	DF	(Italy)	Guglielmo Stendardo	2	0	2
=	17	MF	(Chile)	Carlos Carmona	1	0	2
=	21	MF	(Italy)	Luca Cigarini	2	0	2
10	3	DF	(Italy)	Stefano Lucchini	1	0	1
=	8	MF	(Italy)	Giulio Migliaccio	1	0	1
=	20	MF	(Paraguay)	Marcelo Estigarribia	1	0	1
=	90	MF	(Ivory Coast)	Moussa Koné	0	1	1

Last updated: 6 April 2014
Source: Competitions
