= 2015–16 Atalanta BC season =

Atalanta
2015–16 season
- President: Antonio Percassi
- Manager: Edoardo Reja
- Stadium: Stadio Atleti Azzurri d'Italia
- Serie A: 13th
- Coppa Italia: Fourth round
- Top goalscorer: League: Alejandro Gómez (7); All: Alejandro Gómez (7)
- Highest home attendance: 19,770 vs Juventus (6 March 2016, Serie A)
- Lowest home attendance: 5,333 vs Cittadella (15 August 2015, Coppa Italia)
- Average home league attendance: 15,945
Home colours	Away colours	Third colours

The 2015–16 season was Atalanta Bergamasca Calcio's fifth consecutive season in Serie A after having been relegated to Serie B at the end of the 2009–10 season. The club competed only in domestic competitions, in both Serie A and the Coppa Italia.

== Players ==
=== Squad information ===
As of 2 February 2016

Note: Flags indicate national team as defined under FIFA eligibility rules; some limited exceptions apply. Players may hold more than one non-FIFA nationality.

No.	Pos.	Nation	Player
1	GK	SRB	Boris Radunović
2	DF	ITA	Guglielmo Stendardo
3	DF	BRA	Rafael Toloi
5	DF	ITA	Andrea Masiello
6	DF	ITA	Gianpaolo Bellini (captain)
7	MF	ITA	Marco D'Alessandro
8	MF	ITA	Giulio Migliaccio
10	MF	ARG	Alejandro Gómez
13	FW	TOG	Serge Gakpé (on loan from Genoa)
15	MF	NED	Marten de Roon
17	MF	CHI	Carlos Carmona
20	MF	PAR	Marcelo Estigarribia
21	MF	ITA	Luca Cigarini
22	FW	ITA	Marco Borriello

No.	Pos.	Nation	Player
24	DF	ITA	Andrea Conti
27	MF	SVN	Jasmin Kurtić
28	DF	ITA	Davide Brivio
29	DF	ITA	Gabriel Paletta (on loan from Milan)
30	GK	ITA	Davide Bassi
33	DF	ITA	Nicolò Cherubin (on loan from Bologna)
44	DF	CRO	Anton Krešić
45	FW	ITA	Gaetano Monachello
51	FW	CHI	Mauricio Pinilla
55	DF	ALB	Berat Djimsiti
57	GK	ITA	Marco Sportiello
77	MF	ITA	Cristian Raimondi
93	DF	SEN	Boukary Dramé
97	MF	ITA	Tiziano Tulissi

== Pre-season and friendlies ==
19 July 2015 Friendly	Atalanta	7–0	Rapprasentativa Val Seriana
	Estigarribia 22'; Kurtić 31'; Boakye 47', 57', 59'; Moralez 81', 82'

== Competitions ==
=== Serie A ===
==== League table ====
Pos	Team	Pld	W	D	L	GF	GA	GD	Pts
11	Genoa	38	13	7	18	45	48	−3	46 (Note: Empoli ahead of Genoa on head-to-head goal difference; Empoli +1, Genoa –1.)
12	Torino	38	12	9	17	52	55	−3	45 (Note: Torino ahead of Atalanta on head-to-head points; Torino 6 points, Atalanta 0 points.)
13	Atalanta	38	11	12	15	41	47	−6	45
14	Bologna	38	11	9	18	33	45	−12	42
15	Sampdoria	38	10	10	18	48	61	−13	40

Source: Serie A, Soccerway
Rules for classification: 1) Points; 2) Head-to-head points; 3) Head-to-head goal difference; 4) Goal difference; 5) Goals scored; 6) Draw.

==== Results summary ====
Overall								Home						Away					
Pld	W	D	L	GF	GA	GD	Pts	W	D	L	GF	GA	GD	W	D	L	GF	GA	GD
38	11	12	15	41	47	−6	45	8	6	5	27	21	+6	3	6	10	14	26	−12

Last updated: 15 May 2016.
Source: Competitive matches

==== Results by round ====
Round	1	2	3	4	5	6	7	8	9	10	11	12	13	14	15	16	17	18	19	20	21	22	23	24	25	26	27	28	29	30	31	32	33	34	35	36	37	38
Ground	A	H	A	H	A	H	A	H	A	H	A	A	H	A	H	A	H	A	H	H	A	H	A	H	A	H	A	H	A	H	H	A	H	A	H	A	H	A
Result	L	W	D	D	W	W	L	W	L	W	L	D	L	W	W	L	L	L	L	D	D	D	L	D	D	L	D	L	L	W	W	L	D	D	W	L	D	W
Position	15	8	10	12	10	8	10	8	9	7	8	8	10	9	7	8	9	9	11	11	13	13	13	13	13	13	13	15	15	14	13	14	14	13	13	14	13	13

Updated to match(es) played on 15 May 2016. Source: Competitive matches
A = Away; H = Home; W = Win; D = Draw; L = Loss

==== Matches ====
23 August 2015 1	Internazionale	1–0	Atalanta	Milan
20:45 CEST (UTC+02:00)	Palacio (yellow card) 36'; Jovetić 90+3'; Manaj (yellow card) 90+5'	Report	Moralez (yellow card) 46'; Carmona (yellow card) 66' (yellow-red card) 71'; Pinilla (yellow card) 82'	Stadium: San Siro; Attendance: 37,042; Referee: Gianpaolo Calvarese

30 August 2015 2	Atalanta	2–0	Frosinone	Bergamo
20:45 CEST (UTC+02:00)	Stendardo 21'; Pinilla (yellow card) 35'; Gómez 69'	Report	Blanchard (yellow card) 7'; Diakité (yellow card) 35'; Paganini (yellow card) 56'; Dionisi (yellow card) 90+2'	Stadium: Stadio Atleti Azzurri d'Italia; Attendance: 14,546; Referee: Domenico Celi

13 September 2015 3	Sassuolo	2–2	Atalanta	Reggio Emilia
15:00 CEST (UTC+02:00)	Magnanelli 22'; Duncan (yellow card) 26'; Floro Flores 41'; Sansone (yellow card) 61'; Vrsaljko (yellow card) 83' (yellow-red card) 84'; Missiroli (yellow card) 89'	Report	Cherubin (yellow card) 6'; Pinilla 13', 33', (yellow card) 38' (yellow-red card) 48'; Paletta (yellow card) 19'; Bellini (yellow card) 23'; Toloi (yellow card) 90+2'	Stadium: Mapei Stadium – Città del Tricolore; Attendance: 8,644; Referee: Maurizio Mariani

20 September 2015 4	Atalanta	1–1	Hellas Verona	Bergamo
15:00 CEST (UTC+02:00)	De Roon (yellow card) 54'; Raimondi (yellow card) 86'; Moralez 89'; Monachello (yellow card) 90+4'	Report	Souprayen (yellow card) 13'; Janković (yellow card) 45+1' (yellow-red card) 79'; Sala (yellow card) 49'; Gollini (yellow card) 79'; Pisano 90+7'	Stadium: Stadio Atleti Azzurri d'Italia; Attendance: 14,323; Referee: Fabio Maresca

24 September 2015 5	Empoli	0–1	Atalanta	Empoli
20:45 CEST (UTC+02:00)	Saponara (yellow card) 86'; Dioussé (yellow card) 88'	Report	Toloi 31'; Pinilla (yellow card) 34'; Moralez (yellow card) 41'; Grassi (yellow card) 48'; Bellini (yellow card) 90'	Stadium: Stadio Carlo Castellani; Attendance: 7,625; Referee: Claudio Gavillucci

28 September 2015 6	Atalanta	2–1	Sampdoria	Bergamo
21:00 CEST (UTC+02:00)	Moisander 7' (o.g.); Paletta (yellow card) 57'; De Roon (yellow card) 66'; Migliaccio (yellow card) 88'; Denis 90+1'	Report	Fernando (yellow card) 27'; Mesbah (yellow card) 59'; Zukanović (yellow card) 82'; Soriano 90+4'	Stadium: Stadio Atleti Azzurri d'Italia; Attendance: 15,756; Referee: Paolo Valeri

4 October 2015 7	Fiorentina	3–0	Atalanta	Florence
20:45 CEST (UTC+02:00)	Iličić 6' (pen.); Valero 34'; Verdú 90'	Report	Paletta (red card) 5'; Masiello (yellow card) 22'; Toloi (yellow card) 57'	Stadium: Stadio Artemio Franchi; Attendance: 25,644; Referee: Davide Massa

18 October 2015 8	Atalanta	3–0	Carpi	Bergamo
15:00 CEST (UTC+02:00)	Pinilla 8'; Gómez 43'; Cigarini 63' (pen.); Grassi (yellow card) 65'	Report	Fedele (yellow card) 36'; Cofie (yellow card) 54'; Bubnjić (yellow card) 63'	Stadium: Stadio Atleti Azzurri d'Italia; Attendance: 14,479; Referee: Fabrizio Pasqua

25 October 2015 9	Juventus	2–0	Atalanta	Turin
15:00 CET (UTC+01:00)	Dybala 28', (yellow card) 61'; Mandžukić 49'; Marchisio (yellow card) 51'	Report	De Roon (yellow card) 25'; Grassi (yellow card) 54'; Toloi (yellow card) 57' (yellow-red card) 73'	Stadium: Juventus Stadium; Attendance: 38,720; Referee: Marco Di Bello

28 October 2015 10	Atalanta	2–1	Lazio	Bergamo
20:45 CET (UTC+01:00)	Masiello (yellow card) 65'; Basta 69' (o.g.); Raimondi (yellow card) 72'; Gómez 86'	Report	Biglia (yellow card) 11', (goal) 17'; Onazi (yellow card) 31'; Lulić (yellow card) 74'; Milinković-Savić (yellow card) 90+2'	Stadium: Stadio Atleti Azzurri d'Italia; Attendance: 14,519; Referee: Massimiliano Irrati

1 November 2015 11	Bologna	3–0	Atalanta	Bologna
15:00 CET (UTC+01:00)	Taïder (yellow card) 13'; Ferrari (yellow card) 40'; Gastaldello (yellow card) 47'; Giaccherini 52', (yellow card) 53'; Destro 58'; Masina (yellow card) 77'; Brienza 85'	Report	Kurtić (yellow card) 31'; Carmona (yellow card) 80'; Pinilla (yellow card) 90'	Stadium: Stadio Renato Dall'Ara; Attendance: 15,748; Referee: Marco Guida

7 November 2015 12	Milan	0–0	Atalanta	Milan
20:45 CET (UTC+01:00)	De Sciglio (yellow card) 24'; Mexès (yellow card) 59'; Calabria (yellow card) 77'; Bacca (yellow card) 84'	Report	Cigarini (yellow card) 42'; Pinilla (yellow card) 48'; Gómez (yellow card) 56'; Carmona (yellow card) 89'	Stadium: San Siro; Attendance: 33,912; Referee: Piero Giacomelli

22 November 2015 13	Atalanta	0–1	Torino	Bergamo
15:00 CET (UTC+01:00)	De Roon (yellow card) 36'; Stendardo (yellow card) 64'	Report	Vives (yellow card) 16'; Bovo 52'	Stadium: Stadio Atleti Azzurri d'Italia; Attendance: 15,776; Referee: Angelo Cervellera

29 November 2015 14	Roma	0–2	Atalanta	Rome
15:00 CET (UTC+01:00)	Maicon (red card) 81'; Torosidis (yellow card) 90+5'	Report	Stendardo (yellow card) 12' (yellow-red card) 88'; Gómez 40'; Grassi (yellow card) 58' (yellow-red card) 90+3'; Sportiello (yellow card) 68'; Cigarini (yellow card) 69'; Denis 82' (pen.)	Stadium: Stadio Olimpico; Attendance: 29,222; Referee: Gianpaolo Calvarese

6 December 2015 15	Atalanta	3–0	Palermo	Bergamo
15:00 CET (UTC+01:00)	Denis 18'; Cherubin 26'; Kurtić (yellow card) 42'; Migliaccio (red card) 76'; De Roon 80'	Report	Anđelković (yellow card) 50'; Jajalo (yellow card) 65'; González (yellow card) 68'	Stadium: Stadio Atleti Azzurri d'Italia; Attendance: 14,499; Referee: Carmine Russo

13 December 2015 16	Chievo	1–0	Atalanta	Verona
15:00 CET (UTC+01:00)	Dainelli (yellow card) 21'; Radovanović (yellow card) 32'; Hetemaj (yellow card) 36'; Birsa 76'	Report	Raimondi (yellow card) 37'; Grassi (yellow card) 47'; Cherubin (red card) 66'; Kurtić (yellow card) 90' (yellow-red card) 90+1'	Stadium: Stadio Marc'Antonio Bentegodi; Attendance: 7,500; Referee: Fabrizio Pasqua

20 December 2015 17	Atalanta	1–3	Napoli	Bergamo
15:00 CET (UTC+01:00)	Gómez 54'; Cigarini (yellow card) 80'; Paletta (red card) 90+1'	Report	Koulibaly (yellow card) 42'; Hamšík 52' (pen.); Higuaín 62', 85'; Jorginho (yellow card) 71' (yellow-red card) 74'	Stadium: Stadio Atleti Azzurri d'Italia; Attendance: 17,134; Referee: Gianluca Rocchi

6 January 2016 18	Udinese	2–1	Atalanta	Udine
12:30 CET (UTC+01:00)	Théréau 23'; Perica 45+2'; Felipe (yellow card) 55'; Widmer (yellow card) 68'; Zapata (yellow card) 88'	Report	De Roon (yellow card) 38'; Cigarini (yellow card) 65'; D'Alessandro 75'; Gómez (yellow card) 90+1'	Stadium: Stadio Friuli; Attendance: 13,462; Referee: Angelo Cervellera

10 January 2016 19	Atalanta	0–2	Genoa	Bergamo
15:00 CET (UTC+01:00)	Paletta (yellow card) 51'; D'Alessandro (yellow card) 90'	Report	Suso (yellow card) 25'; Džemaili 79'; Pavoletti 81'; Izzo (yellow card) 87'	Stadium: Stadio Atleti Azzurri d'Italia; Attendance: 13,946; Referee: Marco Guida

16 January 2016 20	Atalanta	1–1	Internazionale	Bergamo
15:00 CET (UTC+01:00)	Toloi (yellow card) 14'; Murillo 17' (o.g.); Gómez (yellow card) 40'; Monachello (yellow card) 51'; Cigarini (yellow card) 90+3'	Report	Toloi 25' (o.g.); Jovetić (yellow card) 36'; Guarín (yellow card) 44'; Brozović (yellow card) 53'; D'Ambrosio (yellow card) 62'; Biabiany (yellow card) 82'	Stadium: Stadio Atleti Azzurri d'Italia; Attendance: 19,274; Referee: Nicola Rizzoli

23 January 2016 21	Frosinone	0–0	Atalanta	Frosinone
18:00 CET (UTC+01:00)	Gori (yellow card) 30'; Ajeti (yellow card) 43'	Report	Kurtić (yellow card) 41'	Stadium: Stadio Matusa; Attendance: 7,564; Referee: Paolo Valeri

30 January 2016 22	Atalanta	1–1	Sassuolo	Bergamo
18:00 CET (UTC+01:00)	Conti (yellow card) 25'; Denis 32'; Diamanti (yellow card) 69'	Report	Berardi 27', (yellow card) 33'; Consigli (yellow card) 32'; Defrel (yellow card) 66'; Longhi (yellow card) 70'	Stadium: Stadio Atleti Azzurri d'Italia; Attendance: 13,640; Referee: Claudio Gavillucci

3 February 2016 23	Hellas Verona	2–1	Atalanta	Verona
20:45 CET (UTC+01:00)	Albertazzi (yellow card) 15'; Siligardi 42'; Ioniță (yellow card) 45+2'; Pazzini 83'	Report	Dramé (yellow card) 20' (yellow-red card) 55'; Conti 30'; De Roon (yellow card) 43'; Migliaccio (yellow card) 83'; Pinilla (yellow card) 90+1'	Stadium: Stadio Marc'Antonio Bentegodi; Attendance: 15,490; Referee: Marco Di Bello

7 February 2016 24	Atalanta	0–0	Empoli	Bergamo
18:00 CET (UTC+01:00)	De Roon (yellow card) 42'; Diamanti (yellow card) 69'; D'Alessandro (yellow card) 77'	Report	Büchel (yellow card) 13'; Tonelli (yellow card) 57'; Laurini (yellow card) 58'; Livaja (yellow card) 84'	Stadium: Stadio Atleti Azzurri d'Italia; Attendance: 12,352; Referee: Michael Fabbri

14 February 2016 25	Sampdoria	0–0	Atalanta	Genoa
15:00 CET (UTC+01:00)	Ivan (yellow card) 30'; Silvestre (yellow card) 41'	Report	De Roon (yellow card) 26'; Diamanti (yellow card) 76'; Gómez (yellow card) 78'; Borriello (yellow card) 85'	Stadium: Stadio Luigi Ferraris; Attendance: 20,341; Referee: Antonio Damato

21 February 2016 26	Atalanta	2–3	Fiorentina	Bergamo
15:00 CET (UTC+01:00)	Pinilla (yellow card) 14', (goal) 90+1'; Dramé (yellow card) 16'; Cigarini (yellow card) 44'; Conti (yellow card) 65' (yellow-red card) 90+2', (goal) 84'	Report	Babacar (yellow card) 15'; Pasqual (yellow card) 45+1'; Fernández 67'; Tello 81'; Kalinić 87'	Stadium: Stadio Atleti Azzurri d'Italia; Attendance: 15,415; Referee: Domenico Celi

27 February 2016 27	Carpi	1–1	Atalanta	Modena
15:00 CET (UTC+01:00)	Lollo (yellow card) 26'; Verdi 75' (pen.); Gagliolo (yellow card) 79'; Poli (yellow card) 89'	Report	Bellini (yellow card) 13'; Kurtić 52'; Diamanti (yellow card) 75'; Borriello (yellow card) 90+1'	Stadium: Stadio Alberto Braglia; Attendance: 6,699; Referee: Gianpaolo Calvarese

6 March 2016 28	Atalanta	0–2	Juventus	Bergamo
15:00 CET (UTC+01:00)	Cigarini (yellow card) 2'; Paletta (yellow card) 51'; Toloi (yellow card) 85'	Report	Barzagli 24'; Pogba (yellow card) 43'; Marchisio (yellow card) 81'; Lemina 86'	Stadium: Stadio Atleti Azzurri d'Italia; Attendance: 19,770; Referee: Paolo Valeri

13 March 2016 29	Lazio	2–0	Atalanta	Rome
20:45 CET (UTC+01:00)	Cataldi (yellow card) 66'; Klose 67', 90+5'; Patric (yellow card) 80'	Report	Cigarini (yellow card) 24'; Sportiello (yellow card) 68'; Toloi (yellow card) 88'; Masiello (yellow card) 90+1'	Stadium: Stadio Olimpico; Attendance: 16,553; Referee: Marco Guida

20 March 2016 30	Atalanta	2–0	Bologna	Bergamo
15:00 CET (UTC+01:00)	Gómez 27'; Pinilla (yellow card) 43'; Diamanti 45+1'	Report	Giaccherini (yellow card) 50'; Rizzo (yellow card) 52'; Gastaldello (yellow card) 77' (yellow-red card) 85'; Mbaye (red card) 78'	Stadium: Stadio Atleti Azzurri d'Italia; Attendance: 18,258; Referee: Piero Giacomelli

3 April 2016 31	Atalanta	2–1	Milan	Bergamo
15:00 CEST (UTC+02:00)	Pinilla 44'; Cigarini (yellow card) 55'; Gómez 62'	Report	Luiz Adriano 5' (pen.); De Sciglio (yellow card) 31'; Bertolacci (yellow card) 45+2'; Zapata (yellow card) 49'	Stadium: Stadio Atleti Azzurri d'Italia; Attendance: 18,652; Referee: Gianluca Rocchi

10 April 2016 32	Torino	2–1	Atalanta	Turin
15:00 CEST (UTC+02:00)	Peres 35', (yellow card) 82'; López 46'; Baselli (yellow card) 77'	Report	Stendardo (yellow card) 24'; De Roon (yellow card) 42' (yellow-red card) 90+1'; Cigarini (yellow card) 74', (goal) 82'; Masiello (yellow card) 75'	Stadium: Stadio Olimpico di Torino; Attendance: 19,369; Referee: Marco Di Bello

17 April 2016 33	Atalanta	3–3	Roma	Bergamo
12:30 CEST (UTC+02:00)	D'Alessandro 33'; Borriello 37', 50', (yellow card) 51'; Masiello (yellow card) 55'; Raimondi (yellow card) 90'; Kurtić (yellow card) 90+4'	Report	Digne 23'; Nainggolan 27'; Zukanović (yellow card) 35'; De Rossi (yellow card) 67'; Totti 85'; Džeko (yellow card) 90'; Manolas (yellow card) 90+4'	Stadium: Stadio Atleti Azzurri d'Italia; Attendance: 15,326; Referee: Massimiliano Irrati

20 April 2016 34	Palermo	2–2	Atalanta	Palermo
20:45 CEST (UTC+02:00)	Vázquez 2' (pen.); Chochev (yellow card) 19'; Struna 76', (yellow card) 81'; Vitiello (red card) 90'; Jajalo (yellow card) 90+1'	Report	Bellini (yellow card) 2'; Borriello 11' (pen.); De Roon (yellow card) 39'; Paletta 55'; Toloi (yellow card) 84'	Stadium: Stadio Renzo Barbera; Referee: Daniele Doveri

24 April 2016 35	Atalanta	1–0	Chievo	Bergamo
15:00 CEST (UTC+02:00)	Paletta (yellow card) 20'; Stendardo (yellow card) 32'; Borriello 55'; Gómez (red card) 75'; Kurtić (yellow card) 86'	Report	Hetemaj (yellow card) 17'; Spolli (yellow card) 86'	Stadium: Stadio Atleti Azzurri d'Italia; Attendance: 15,914; Referee: Angelo Cervellera

2 May 2016 36	Napoli	2–1	Atalanta	Naples
21:00 CEST (UTC+02:00)	Higuaín 10', 77'	Report	Masiello (yellow card) 62'; Djimsiti (yellow card) 68'; Albiol 85' (o.g.)	Stadium: Stadio San Paolo; Attendance: 24,514; Referee: Piero Giacomelli

8 May 2016 37	Atalanta	1–1	Udinese	Bergamo
15:00 CEST (UTC+02:00)	Bellini 19' (pen.); Brivio (yellow card) 33'	Report	Zapata 10'; Kuzmanović (yellow card) 37'; Kadhim (yellow card) 45+3'	Stadium: Stadio Atleti Azzurri d'Italia; Attendance: 19,380; Referee: Nicola Rizzoli

15 May 2016 38	Genoa	1–2	Atalanta	Genoa
18:00 CEST (UTC+02:00)	Laxalt (yellow card) 30'; Pavoletti 58'; Izzo (yellow card) 60'; Rincón (yellow card) 64'	Report	D'Alessandro 52', (yellow card) 53'; Brivio (yellow card) 55'; Masiello (yellow card) 68'; Kurtić 82'	Stadium: Stadio Luigi Ferraris; Attendance: 21,621; Referee: Gianluca Aureliano

=== Coppa Italia ===
15 August 2015 Third round	Atalanta	3–0	Cittadella	Bergamo
20:45 CEST (UTC+02:00)	De Roon 63'; Moralez 68'; Pinilla 78'	Report		Stadium: Stadio Atleti Azzurri d'Italia; Attendance: 5,333; Referee: Fabio Maresca

2 December 2015 Fourth round	Udinese	3–1	Atalanta	Udine
21:00 CET (UTC+01:00)	Di Natale 5' (pen.), 76'; Marquinho (yellow card) 22'; Perica 57'; Fernandes (yellow card) 64'; Insúa (yellow card) 87'	Report	Estigarribia (yellow card) 36'; Monachello 48'; Stendardo (yellow card) 54'; Grassi (yellow card) 64'	Stadium: Stadio Friuli; Attendance: 2,000; Referee: Riccardo Pinzani

== Statistics ==
=== Appearances and goals ===
No.	Pos	Nat	Player	Total		Serie A		Coppa Italia	
No.	Pos	Nat	Player	Apps	Goals	Apps	Goals	Apps	Goals
Goalkeepers
1	GK	(Serbia) SRB	Boris Radunović	1	0	1	0	0	0
30	GK	(Italy) ITA	Davide Bassi	2	0	1	0	1	0
57	GK	(Italy) ITA	Marco Sportiello	37	0	36	0	1	0
Defenders
2	DF	(Italy) ITA	Guglielmo Stendardo	16	1	12+3	1	1	0
3	DF	(Brazil) BRA	Rafael Toloi	24	1	21+3	1	0	0
5	DF	(Italy) ITA	Andrea Masiello	31	0	27+2	0	2	0
6	DF	(Italy) ITA	Gianpaolo Bellini	15	1	11+4	1	0	0
24	DF	(Italy) ITA	Andrea Conti	15	2	10+4	2	1	0
28	DF	(Italy) ITA	Davide Brivio	16	0	10+4	0	2	0
29	DF	(Italy) ITA	Gabriel Paletta	24	1	24	1	0	0
33	DF	(Italy) ITA	Nicolò Cherubin	16	1	10+4	1	2	0
44	DF	(Croatia) CRO	Anton Krešić	0	0	0	0	0	0
55	DF	(Albania) ALB	Berat Djimsiti	3	0	3	0	0	0
93	DF	(Senegal) SEN	Boukary Dramé	25	0	25	0	0	0
Midfielders
4	MF	(Italy) ITA	Roberto Gagliardini	1	0	1	0	0	0
7	MF	(Italy) ITA	Marco D'Alessandro	25	3	11+12	3	2	0
8	MF	(Italy) ITA	Giulio Migliaccio	19	0	3+15	0	0+1	0
10	MF	(Argentina) ARG	Alejandro Gómez	36	7	33+1	7	1+1	0
11	MF	(Switzerland) SUI	Remo Freuler	6	0	5+1	0	0	0
15	MF	(Netherlands) NED	Marten de Roon	37	2	35+1	1	1	1
17	MF	(Chile) CHI	Carlos Carmona	9	0	5+3	0	1	0
20	MF	(Paraguay) PAR	Marcelo Estigarribia	5	0	0+4	0	1	0
21	MF	(Italy) ITA	Luca Cigarini	26	2	21+4	2	1	0
23	MF	(Italy) ITA	Alessandro Diamanti	16	1	9+7	1	0	0
27	MF	(Slovenia) SVN	Jasmin Kurtić	34	2	30+2	2	1+1	0
77	MF	(Italy) ITA	Cristian Raimondi	19	0	5+12	0	1+1	0
97	MF	(Italy) ITA	Tiziano Tulissi	0	0	0	0	0	0
Forwards
13	FW	(Togo) TOG	Serge Gakpé	5	0	0+5	0	0	0
22	FW	(Italy) ITA	Marco Borriello	15	4	8+7	4	0	0
45	FW	(Italy) ITA	Gaetano Monachello	11	1	3+7	0	1	1
51	FW	(Chile) CHI	Mauricio Pinilla	21	6	16+4	5	0+1	1
Players transferred out during the season
4	MF	(Italy) ITA	Luigi Giorgi	1	0	0+1	0	0	0
11	MF	(Argentina) ARG	Maxi Moralez	18	2	16+1	1	0+1	1
19	FW	(Argentina) ARG	Germán Denis	16	4	12+3	4	1	0
88	MF	(Italy) ITA	Alberto Grassi	14	0	13	0	1	0

Last updated: 15 May 2016
Source: Competitions

=== Goalscorers ===
Rank	No.	Pos	Nat	Name	Serie A	Coppa Italia	Total
1	10	FW	(Argentina)	Alejandro Gómez	7	0	7
2	9	FW	(Chile)	Mauricio Pinilla	5	1	6
3	19	FW	(Argentina)	Germán Denis	4	0	4
3	22	FW	(Italy)	Marco Borriello	4	0	4
5	7	MF	(Italy)	Marco D'Alessandro	3	0	3
6	11	MF	(Argentina)	Maxi Moralez	1	1	2
6	15	MF	(Netherlands)	Marten de Roon	1	1	2
6	21	MF	(Italy)	Luca Cigarini	2	0	2
6	24	DF	(Italy)	Andrea Conti	2	0	2
6	27	MF	(Slovenia)	Jasmin Kurtić	2	0	2
11	2	DF	(Italy)	Guglielmo Stendardo	1	0	1
11	3	DF	(Brazil)	Rafael Toloi	1	0	1
11	6	DF	(Italy)	Gianpaolo Bellini	1	0	1
11	23	MF	(Italy)	Alessandro Diamanti	1	0	1
11	29	DF	(Italy)	Gabriel Paletta	1	0	1
11	33	DF	(Italy)	Nicolò Cherubin	1	0	1
11	45	FW	(Italy)	Gaetano Monachello	0	1	1
Own goal					4	0	4
Totals					41	4	45

Last updated: 15 May 2016

=== Clean sheets ===
Rank	No.	Pos	Nat	Name	Serie A	Coppa Italia	Total
1	57	GK	(Italy)	Marco Sportiello	11	1	12
Totals					11	1	12

Last updated: 15 May 2016
