= Stendardo =

Stendardo is an Italian surname. Notable people with the surname include:

- Guglielmo Stendardo (born 1981), Italian footballer
- Mariano Stendardo (born 1983), Italian footballer
