= Maxi Moralez =

Argentine footballer (born 1987)

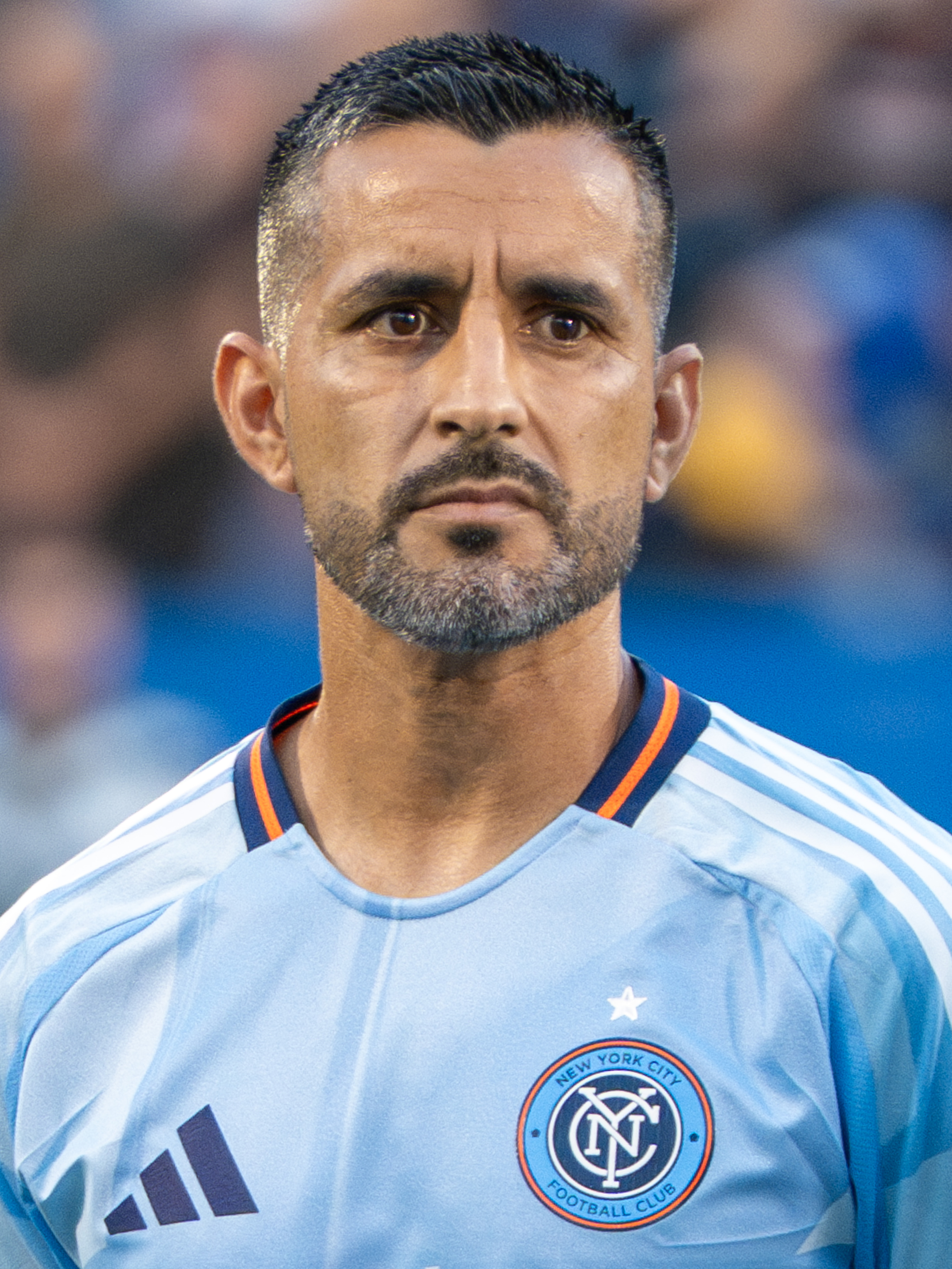
- Moralez with New York City FC in 2025

Personal information
- Full name: Maximiliano Nicolás Moralez
- Date of birth: 27 February 1987 (age 39)
- Place of birth: Granadero Baigorria, Argentina
- Height: 1.60 m (5 ft 3 in)
- Position: Attacking midfielder

Team information
- Current team: New York City FC
- Number: 10

Youth career
- Racing

Senior career*
Years	Team	Apps	(Gls)
2005–2007	Racing	52	(8)
2007–2009	FC Moscow	6	(0)
2008	→ Racing (loan)	36	(8)
2009–2011	Vélez Sársfield	72	(20)
2011–2015	Atalanta	142	(18)
2016–2017	León	34	(6)
2017–2022	New York City FC	162	(26)
2023	Racing	17	(1)
2023–	New York City FC	69	(4)

International career^{‡}
2007	Argentina U20	16	(5)
2011	Argentina	1	(0)
- * Club domestic league appearances and goals as of 16 May 2026 (UTC) ‡ National team caps and goals as of 16 July 2015 (UTC)

Maximiliano Nicolás "Maxi" Moralez (born 27 February 1987) is an Argentine professional footballer who plays as an attacking midfielder for Major League Soccer club New York City FC. He is nicknamed frasquito (English: little flask).

== Club career ==
Moralez started playing professionally for Racing Club in the Argentine Primera División during the 2005 Clausura tournament, entering the field on a 2–2 draw with Colón. In 2007, Moralez was bought by FC Moscow. However, after only half a season in the Russian club, he was loaned back to Racing Club. Moralez helped his club avoid relegation during the 2007–08 season, scoring the winning goal against Belgrano in the relegation playoff.

For the 2009 Clausura tournament, Moralez was bought by Vélez Sársfield. During his first season in the club, he helped the team become Argentine champion, playing 14 (out of 19) games and scoring 5 goals. He scored the winning goal against Huracán on the 83rd minute of the final game, giving Vélez the 1–0 victory necessary to win the championship. During the following tournament, the 2009 Apertura, Moralez was Vélez' top goalscorer (along Jonathan Cristaldo) with 5 goals each.

On 5 March 2011, Moralez renewed his contract with Vélez until June 2013. During that semester, he won his second league title with the club (the 2011 Clausura) playing 15 of the 19 games, and scoring 4 goals. He also played 11 of the 12 games of his team's Copa Libertadores semi-finalist campaign, scoring 5 goals.

On 27 July 2011, Atalanta B.C., recently promoted to the Serie A, paid Moralez's buyout clause to Vélez Sársfield (€8 million for the 50% transfer rights owned by Vélez). The Argentine midfielder was introduced by his new club three days later.

On 24 December 2015, Jesús Martínez Murguía (León's President), confirmed that Moralez would be playing the 2016 tournament with Club León.

On 15 February 2017, New York City FC announced that he had been signed as a Designated Player.

== International career ==
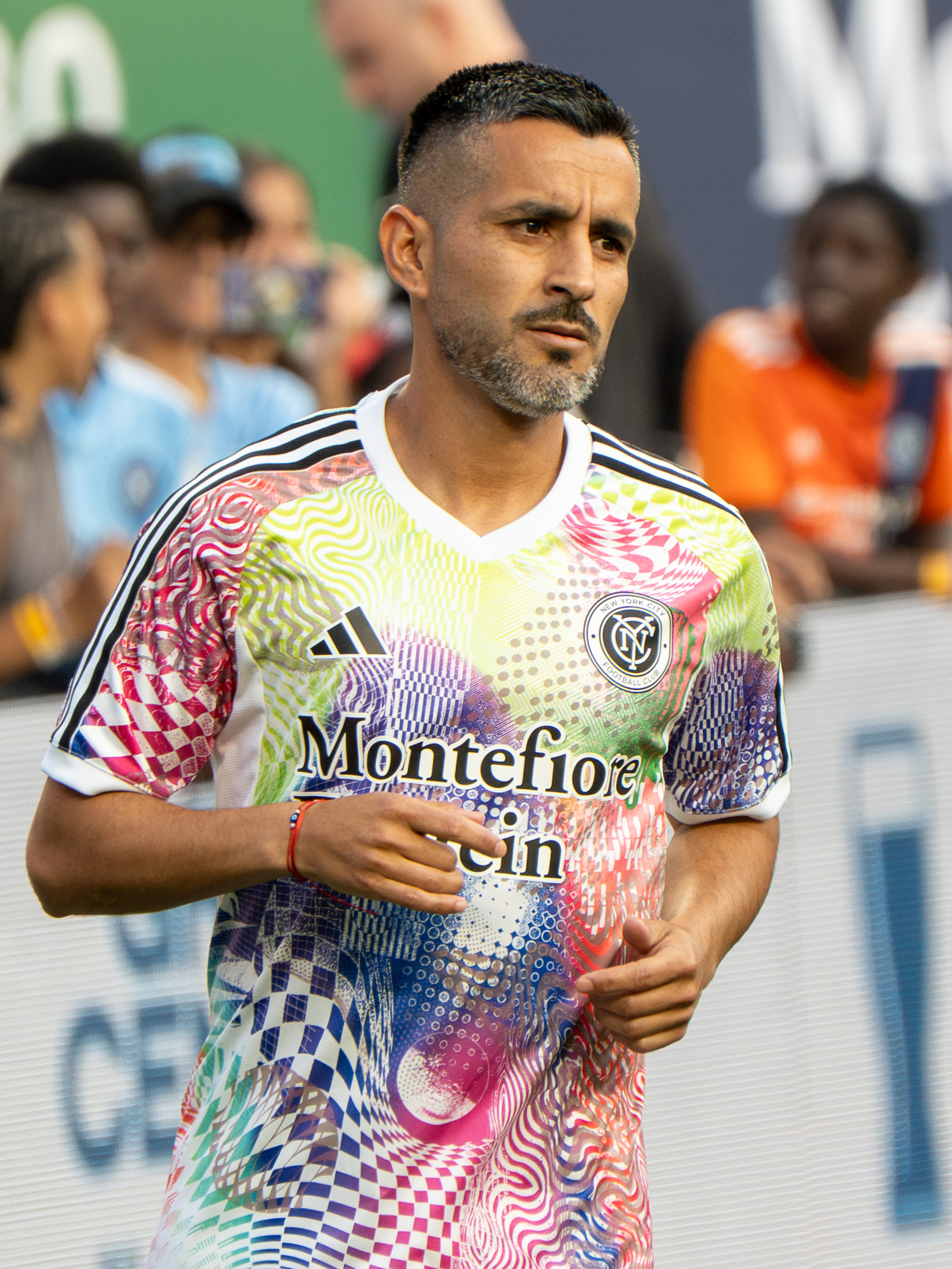
Maxi Moralez during New York City FC vs Atlanta United in 2025

In 2007, Moralez was called for the Argentina under-20 squad for the South American Youth Championship held in Paraguay. Later that year, he was part of Argentina FIFA U-20 World Cup title winning team. He played along Sergio Agüero and Mauro Zárate in the attack. Moralez was third-highest scorer in the tournament (bronze shoe) and was named second-best player (silver ball), behind his teammate Agüero.

In November 2010, Moralez was selected as part of an Argentine league squad to train twice-weekly with the Argentina national team. He made his senior international debut in a 4–1 friendly victory over Venezuela on 16 March 2011.

== Career statistics ==
=== Club ===
As of match played 16 May 2026

Appearances and goals by club, season and competition
Club	Season	League			Cup		Continental		Other		Total	
Club	Season	Division	Apps	Goals	Apps	Goals	Apps	Goals	Apps	Goals	Apps	Goals
Racing Club	2004–05	Argentine Primera División	4	0	0	0	—		—		4	0
Racing Club	2005–06	Argentine Primera División	15	1	0	0	—		—		15	1
Racing Club	2006–07	Argentine Primera División	33	7	0	0	—		—		33	7
Racing Club	Total		52	8	0	0	0	0	0	0	52	8
FC Moscow	2007	Russian Premier League	6	0	1	0	—		—		7	0
Racing Club (loan)	2007–08	Argentine Primera División	18	3	0	0	—		—		18	3
Racing Club (loan)	2008–09	Argentine Primera División	18	5	0	0	—		—		18	5
Racing Club (loan)	Total		36	8	0	0	0	0	0	0	36	8
Vélez Sársfield	2008–09	Argentine Primera División	14	5	0	0	0	0	—		14	5
Vélez Sársfield	2009–10	Argentine Primera División	26	7	0	0	15 (Note: Seven appearances in Copa Sudamericana, eight appearances in Copa Libertadores)	0	—		41	7
Vélez Sársfield	2010–11	Argentine Primera División	32	8	0	0	11 (Note: Appearance(s) in Copa Libertadores)	5	—		43	13
Vélez Sársfield	Total		72	20	0	0	26	5	0	0	98	25
Atalanta	2011–12	Serie A	34	6	1	1	—		—		35	7
Atalanta	2012–13	Serie A	29	1	2	0	—		—		31	1
Atalanta	2013–14	Serie A	32	5	1	0	—		—		33	5
Atalanta	2014–15	Serie A	30	5	1	0	—		—		31	5
Atalanta	2015–16	Serie A	17	1	1	1	—		—		18	2
Atalanta	Total		142	18	6	2	0	0	0	0	148	20
León	2015–16	Liga MX	18	4	2	1	—		—		20	5
León	2016–17	Liga MX	16	2	5	0	—		—		21	2
León	Total		34	6	7	1	0	0	0	0	41	7
New York City FC	2017	Major League Soccer	29	5	1	0	—		2 (Note: Appearance(s) in MLS Cup playoffs)	0	32	5
New York City FC	2018	Major League Soccer	32	8	0	0	—		3	1	35	9
New York City FC	2019	Major League Soccer	29	7	3	1	—		1	0	33	8
New York City FC	2020	Major League Soccer	13 (Note: Includes two appearances in MLS is Back Tournament group stage)	1	—		4 (Note: Appearance(s) in CONCACAF Champions League)	0	3 (Note: Two appearances and one goal in MLS is Back Tournament knockout stage, one appearance in MLS Cup playoffs)	1	20	2
New York City FC	2021	Major League Soccer	30	3	—		—		5 (Note: One appearance in Leagues Cup, four appearances and one goal in MLS Cup playoffs)	1	35	4
New York City FC	2022	Major League Soccer	29	2	2	0	4 (Note: Appearance(s) in CONCACAF Champions League)	1	4 (Note: One appearance and one goal in Campeones Cup, three appearances and three goals in MLS Cup playoffs)	4	39	7
New York City FC	Total		162	26	6	1	8	1	18	7	194	35
Racing Club	2023	Argentine Primera División	17	1	2	0	3	0	1 (Note: Appearance in Supercopa Internacional)	0	23	1
New York City FC	2023	Major League Soccer	4	0	—		—		—		4	0
New York City FC	2024	Major League Soccer	17	1	—		—		9 (Note: Five appearances and one goal in Leagues Cup, four appearances in MLS Cup playoffs)	1	26	2
New York City FC	2025	Major League Soccer	34	2	0	0	—		7 (Note: Two appearances in Leagues Cup, five appearances and one goal in MLS Cup playoffs)	1	41	3
New York City FC	2026	Major League Soccer	14	1	1	0	—		0	0	15	1
New York City FC	Total		69	4	1	0	0	0	16	2	86	6
Career total			590	91	23	4	37	6	35	9	685	110

== Honours ==
Vélez Sársfield

- Argentine Primera División: 2009 Clausura, 2011 Clausura

New York City FC

- MLS Cup: 2021
- Campeones Cup: 2022

Racing Club

- Supercopa Internacional: 2022

Argentina U20

- FIFA U-20 World Cup: 2007

Individual

- FIFA U-20 World Cup Silver Ball: 2007
- FIFA U-20 World Cup Bronze Shoe: 2007
- MLS All-Star: 2019
- MLS Best XI: 2019
- MLS top assist provider: 2019
