= Tiziano Tulissi =

Italian footballer

Personal information
- Date of birth: 22 July 1997 (age 29)
- Place of birth: Bergamo, Italy
- Height: 1.74 m (5 ft 9 in)
- Position: Forward

Team information
- Current team: Tritium
- Number: 10

Youth career
- –2016: Atalanta

Senior career*
| Years | Team | Apps | (Gls) |
| 2015–2020 | Atalanta | 0 | (0) |
| 2016–2017 | → Modena (loan) | 19 | (0) |
| 2017 | → Piacenza (loan) | 7 | (1) |
| 2017–2019 | → Reggina (loan) | 61 | (3) |
| 2019–2020 | → Modena (loan) | 23 | (2) |
| 2020–2023 | Modena | 27 | (3) |
| 2021–2022 | → Virtus Francavilla (loan) | 12 | (1) |
| 2022–2023 | → Fermana (loan) | 10 | (0) |
| 2023– | Tritium | 4 | (0) |

International career
| 2012 | Italy U-15 | 2 | (0) |
| 2012–2013 | Italy U-16 | 5 | (1) |
- * Club domestic league appearances and goals as of 20 December 2023

Tiziano Tulissi (born 21 July 1997) is an Italian footballer who plays as a forward for Serie D club Tritium.

== Club career ==
He made his Serie C debut for Modena on 3 September 2016 in a game against Feralpisalò.

On 7 August 2019, he returned to Modena on another loan. On 22 August 2020, Modena bought out his rights on a permanent basis. On 31 August 2021, he was loaned to Virtus Francavilla. On 13 August 2022, Tulissi moved on loan to Fermana.
