= Mariano Stendardo =

Italian footballer (born 1983)

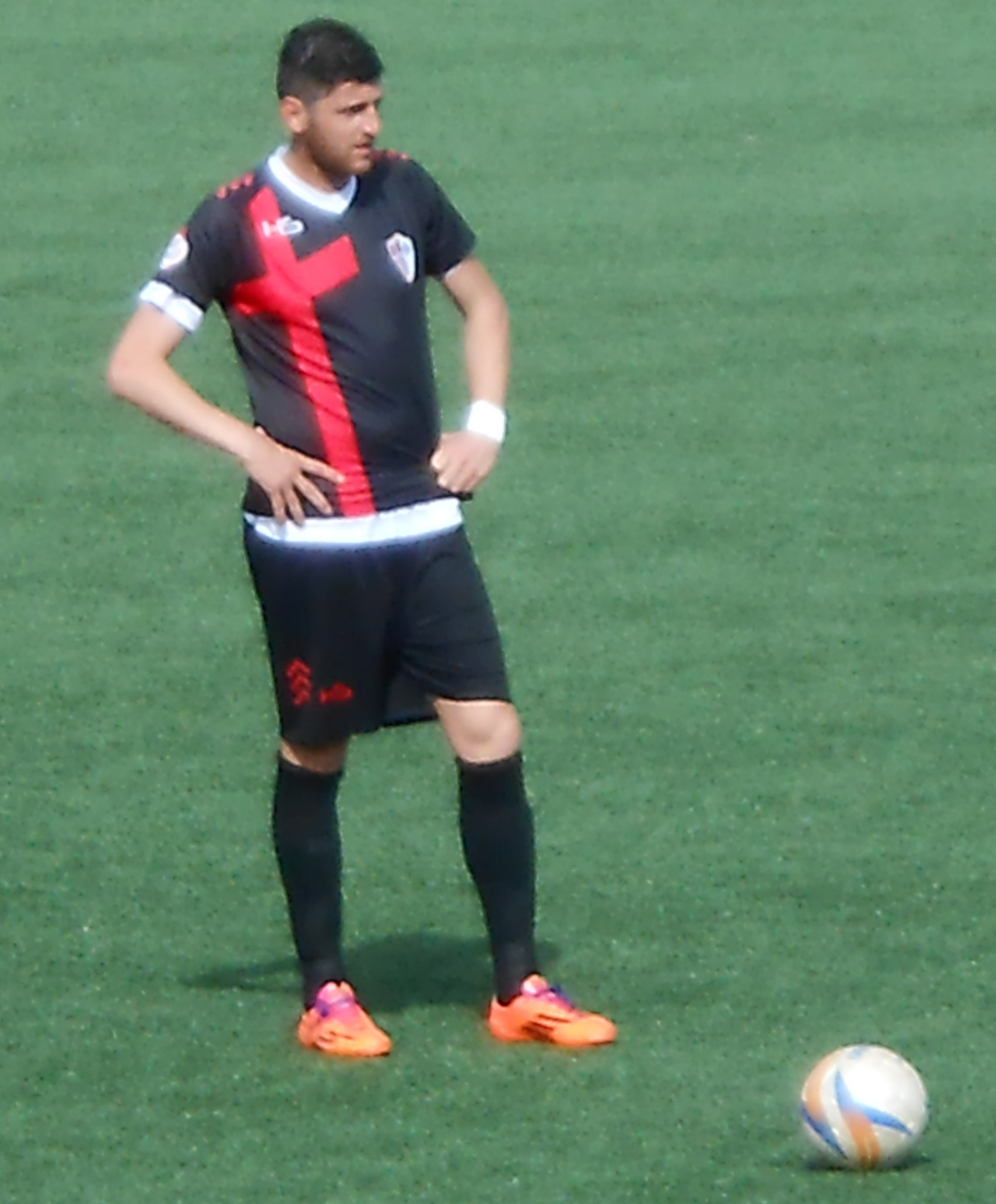
- Stendardo in 2014.

Personal information
- Full name: Mariano Stendardo
- Date of birth: 2 May 1983 (age 43)
- Place of birth: Naples, Italy
- Height: 1.89 m (6 ft 2 in)
- Position: Centre back

Team information
- Current team: Giugliano

Senior career*
Years	Team	Apps	(Gls)
2001–2004	Napoli	9	(0)
2003–2004	→ Taranto (loan)	5	(0)
2004	Lecce	0	(0)
2004–2005	Perugia	0	(0)
2005–2007	Atalanta	0	(0)
2005–2006	→ Bellaria (loan)	33	(6)
2006–2007	→ Cremonese (loan)	32	(5)
2007–2008	Messina	35	(2)
2008–2011	Genoa	0	(0)
2008–2009	→ Grosseto (loan)	13	(0)
2009–2010	→ Salernitana (loan)	28	(2)
2011	Pisa	4	(0)
2011–2012	Ternana	5	(0)
2012–2013	Treviso	22	(1)
2013–2014	Savoia	31	(2)
2014–2015	Barletta	34	(0)
2015–2017	Fidelis Andria	32	(0)
2016–2017	→ Taranto (loan)	19	(1)
2017–2019	Matera	20	(2)
2019–2020	Paganese	39	(1)
2020–	Giugliano	0	(0)
- * Club domestic league appearances and goals as of 7 March 2020

Mariano Stendardo (born 2 May 1983) is an Italian footballer who plays for the Serie D side Giugliano as a defender.

He has never played a match in Serie A, despite being on the roster of Lecce when they competed in Serie A in 2004. His brother Guglielmo is also a footballer.

== Career ==
=== Early career ===
Along with his brother Guglielmo, Mariano started his career at S.S.C. Napoli. Both Guglielmo and Mariano were transferred to separate clubs, with Mariano joining U.S. Lecce on 31 January 2004 and Guglielmo for Sampdoria in January 1999. In summer 2004 the two brothers were both transferred to Perugia.

=== Atalanta ===
However, on 28 January 2005, Mariano moved to Atalanta in a co-ownership deal, for €2,000, (Note: Debiti per compartecipazioni ex art.102-bis N.O.I.F. of Atalanta B.C. in 2004–05 season, €1.502 million in lum sum, deducting figures of Igor Budan (€1 million) and Adriano (€500,000) obtained from Palermo's financial filing.) while Guglielmo remained at Perugia before joining Lazio in summer 2005. Atalanta acquired the full registration rights of Mariano in summer 2005 for free, after the bankruptcy of Perugia.

==== Loans ====
From Atalanta, Mariano was loaned to Bellaria and Cremonese in the 2005–06 and 2006–07 seasons.

=== Messina ===
Mariano joined Messina on 24 July 2007, for €200,000, as part of Sergio Floccari's deal.

=== Genoa ===
After the bankruptcy of Messina in 2008, Stendardo left for Genoa C.F.C. on a free transfer.

=== Lega Pro clubs ===
On 31 January 2011 he joined Pisa from Genoa.

On 2 November 2012 he was signed by Treviso. Stendardo was signed by Serie D club Savoia. The club promoted to Lega Pro in 2014.

In 2014, he was signed by Barletta. The club was expelled from 2015–16 Lega Pro due to financial difficulties.

On 19 July 2015, he signed a 2-year deal with the Lega Pro newcomer Fidelis Andria.

On 21 January 2019, he signed a 1.5-year contract with Paganese.

On 21 August 2020 he moved to Serie D club Giugliano.
