= Michele Ferri =

Italian association football defender

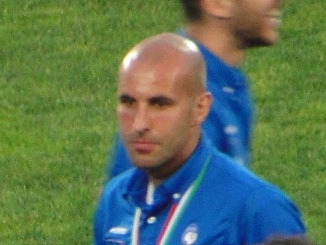

Personal information
- Date of birth: 28 May 1981 (age 45)
- Place of birth: Busto Arsizio, Italy
- Height: 1.85 m (6 ft 1 in)
- Position: Defender

Youth career
- Milan

Senior career*
Years	Team	Apps	(Gls)
2001–2002	Milan	0	(0)
2001–2002	→ Cesena (loan)	25	(1)
2002–2003	Triestina	27	(1)
2003–2005	Palermo	39	(3)
2006–2008	Cagliari	64	(1)
2009	Sampdoria	6	(0)
2009–2010	Vicenza	26	(0)
2010–2013	Atalanta	31	(0)
2014	Trapani	13	(0)
2014–2015	Pro Vercelli	15	(0)
2015–2016	Pro Patria	24	(0)
2016–2018	Varese	18	(1)

International career
2000	Italy U-18	5	(0)
2001–2002	Italy U-20	14	(0)
2002–2003	Italy U-21	4	(0)
- * Club domestic league appearances and goals as of 2 February 2014

Michele Ferri (born 28 May 1981) is an Italian former association football defender who last played for Italian club Varese.

== Career ==
=== Milan ===
He grew up within the A.C. Milan youth system, but never played a full senior game for the rossoneri, instead being sent to lower league teams, namely Cesena and Triestina.

=== Triestina ===
Ferri was sold to Triestina in a co-ownership deal for 400 million lire (€206,583) along with Eder Baù (200 million lire) and Alessandro Budel (400 million lire) in June 2002. On 11 June 2003 Triestina acquired the remain half of the contract from Milan for €2 million (with Budel returned to Milan also for €2 million fee).

=== Palermo ===
On 19 July 2003, Ferri was acquired by Serie B club Palermo for a fee of €1 million and a 5-year contract, which then became league champions in 2004. But after Palermo won promotion to Serie A, his first team appearances were limited to 15 games. Ferri made his Serie A debut on 6 January 2005 for Palermo, against Reggina.

On 31 January 2006 he was sold to Cagliari for €1 million fee, in another co-ownership deal.

=== Cagliari ===
Ferri was signed by Cagliari on 31 January 2006, re-joining Budel. In June 2007 Cagliari bought the remaining half of the registration rights of Ferri, for an additional €600,000 fee.

=== Sampdoria ===
He joined Sampdoria in January 2009 for a peppercorn fee of €1,000. He just played twice in 2008–09 Serie A season for Cagliari in September against A.C. Siena and November against Calcio Catania before joined Sampdoria. He successively left the club on a free transfer and joined Serie B outfit Vicenza later in September 2009.

In November 2010, Ferri joined Atalanta in another free transfer.

On 31 January 2014, Ferri joined Serie B side Trapani, signing a deal until the end of the 2013–14 season. He successively left Trapani to join fellow Serie B club Pro Vercelli. He then played the 2015–2016 season with hometown club Pro Patria, which he then left to join Serie D club Varese during the summer of 2016.
