= Ciro Polito =

Italian footballer (born 1979)

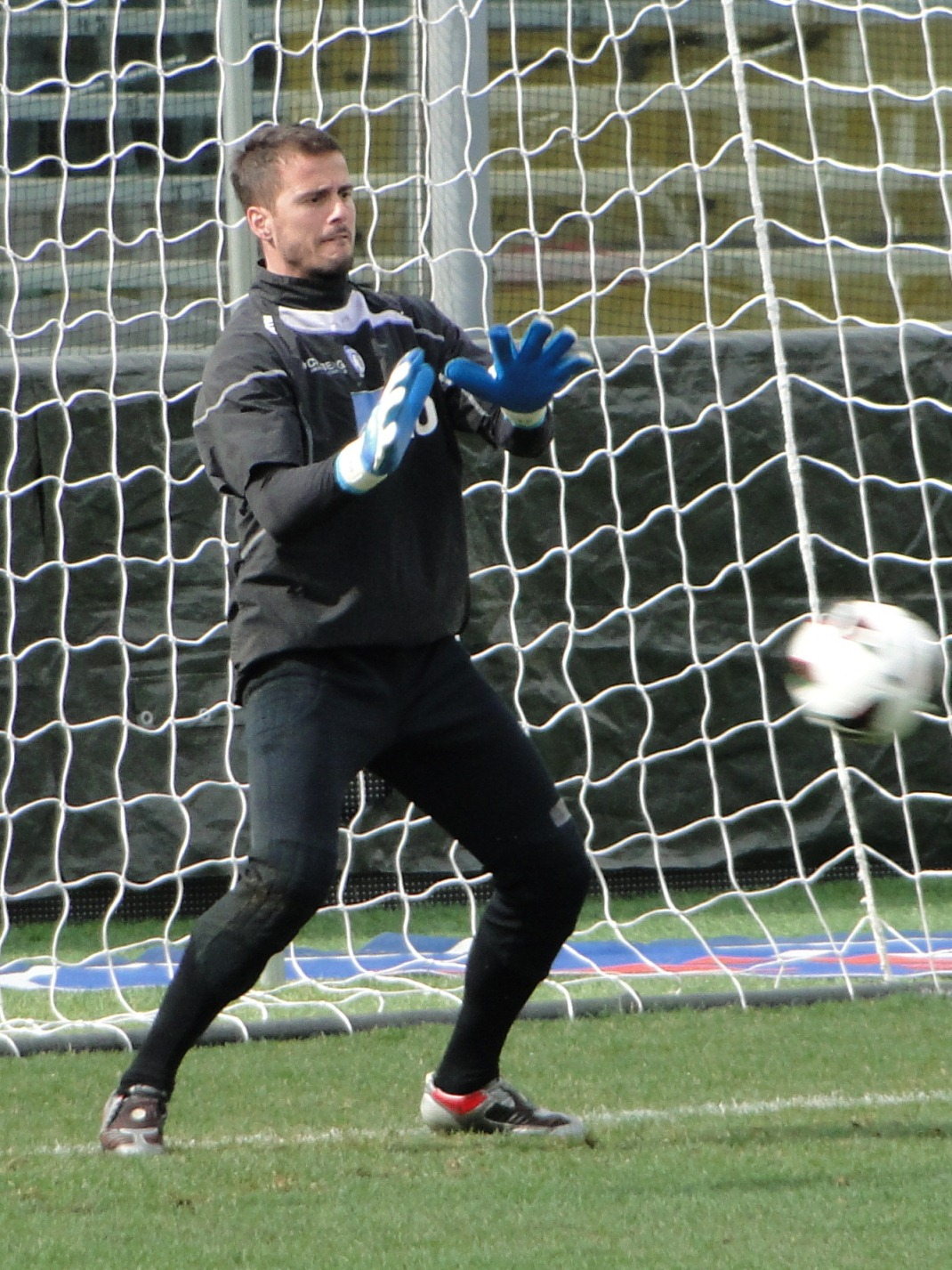

Personal information
- Date of birth: 12 April 1979 (age 47)
- Place of birth: Naples, Italy
- Height: 1.84 m (6 ft 0 in)
- Position: Goalkeeper

Team information
- Current team: Bari (sporting director)

Senior career*
Years	Team	Apps	(Gls)
1997–1999	Salernitana	0	(0)
1998–1999	→ Rimini (loan)	29	(0)
1999–2000	Lucchese	5	(0)
2000	→ Mantova (loan)	12	(0)
2000–2002	Avellino	22	(0)
2002–2003	Pistoiese	29	(0)
2003–2004	Acireale	30	(0)
2004–2009	Catania	37	(0)
2007	→ Pescara (loan)	17	(0)
2009	→ Grosseto (loan)	18	(0)
2009–2011	Salernitana	32	(1)
2011–2014	Atalanta	5	(0)
2014–2015	Sassuolo	0	(0)
2015–2016	Juve Stabia	17	(0)

Managerial career
- 2017–2020: Juve Stabia (sporting director)
- 2020–2021: Ascoli (sporting director)
- 2021–: Bari (sporting director)
- * Club domestic league appearances and goals

Ciro Polito (born 12 April 1979) is an Italian football official and a former goalkeeper. He is the sporting director of Bari.

== Career ==
=== Salernitana ===
Ciro Polito began his football career with the youth system of Salerno based club, Salernitana Sport, in the mid-1990s, and began to earn senior call-ups in 1997. Despite often being called up during the 1997–98 season, Polito was loaned out to Rimini for the 1998–99 season, and managed to earn a starting position for much of the season. With the club, Polito made 29 league appearances and returned to Salerno in 1999, but the young goalkeeper never earned a senior debut for his near-hometown club. In July 1999 he was involved in a swap deal with Lucchese. The deal saw Lorenzo Squizzi move in the opposite direction, with both players joining their new clubs in a co-ownership deal.

=== Lucchese ===
Polito made just 5 appearances with his new club and was hence, loaned out in January 2000, to A.C. Mantova. The loan spell proved to be successful, as Polito earned starting gloves for the remainder of the campaign, making 12 starts. In June 2000, he returned to Lucchese, but their share of his contract was sold back to Salernitnana, but Polito did not remain in Salerno either and he was sold to nearby rivals Avellino.

=== Avellino ===
Since signed by Avellino permanently, the goalkeeper failed to break into the club's starting line-up in two seasons, but still managed to make 22 league appearances as a back-up between 2000 and 2002, when he was sold to A.C. Pistoiese.

=== Pistoiese & Acireale ===
Following his move to A.C. Pistoiese, Polito again earned a starting position, and went on to make 33 appearances for his new club in all competitions, in just one season. Following his impressive form during the course of the 2002–2003 season, he was scouted by, and eventually sold to Sicilian club, Acireale. After officially joining the Sicilian outfit in July 2003, Polito again found a position in the starting XI of his newest club, and made 30 league appearances that season. He was then scouted by Catania chief director Pietro Lo Monaco, and was brought to the club during the summer window of 2004.

=== Catania ===
After playing many seasons in the Italian Serie C1 and Serie C2, Polito made the step to Serie B in 2004, when he transferred to Sicilian club, Calcio Catania. In his first two seasons with the club, Polito made just 5 appearances, as he was utilized as a back-up to veteran Armando Pantanelli. Polito was a part of the team that led Catania to a runner-up finish in the league during the 2005–06 season, which earned the club promotion to the Italian Serie A.

It was his first season in the top flight. During his first season in the league, Polito again served as a back-up for Pantanelli, but he managed his Serie A debut, and only appearance in the season, on 26 November 2006. In January 2007, Polito was loaned out to Pescara, in exchange for Vitangelo Spadavecchia, who also joined on loan. At Pescara, Polito played as the starting goalkeeper, ahead of Marco Tardiolli, and made 17 league appearances over the remaining portion of the Serie B season.

In June 2007, Polito returned to Catania, after the departure of Pantanelli. Under new coach, Silvio Baldini, Polito became the club's starting shot-stopper and his career took off. He was a major part of the club's first team, until Walter Zenga took over as head coach and Polito was dropped in favor of Albano Bizzarri.

Polito began the 2008-09 Serie A campaign, the same way he ended the previous season, on the bench. Zenga actually opted to drop Polito to third choice, behind new signing Tomas Kosicky, and hence, Polito was ultimately set for a winter transfer, following his falling-out-of-favor with the coach. On 3 January 2008, Catania signed goalkeeper, Paolo Acerbis from Grosseto on loan, and in return, sent Polito to Grosseto on loan to fill the gap left by Acerbis. Both clubs obtained the option to make the deals permanent at the end of the season.

At Grosseto, Polito took over the starting gloves, and made 18 Serie B starts. With Catania, not using the option to make the deal permanent, both players returned to their respective clubs. Polito was instantly transfer listed and sold back to his youth club, Salernitana Calcio in July 2009. He made over 50 appearances for Catania in all competitions.

=== Return to Salernitana ===
He signed a 3-year contract with Salernitana as the club lost Tommaso Berni, following the expiration of his loan deal and Salvatore Pinna, who was sold to Pescara Calcio. Polito managed to make 34 appearances (2 in Cup in all competitions for his club, and even managed a rare goal, but his efforts were not enough to save the club from relegation to the Lega Pro Prima Divisione for the 2010-11 Lega Calcioseason.

=== Atalanta ===
Having been released from Salernitana at the end of the 2010–11 season, Polito joined Atalanta on 23 September 2011 to provide injury cover.

=== Sassuolo ===
He left Atalanta for the Serie A rivals Sassuolo on 31 January 2014. Polito was re-signed by Sassuolo in a 1-year contract on 17 July 2014.

=== Juve Stabia ===
On 20 October 2015, he was signed by Juve Stabia for free.
