= Riccardo Cazzola =

Italian footballer

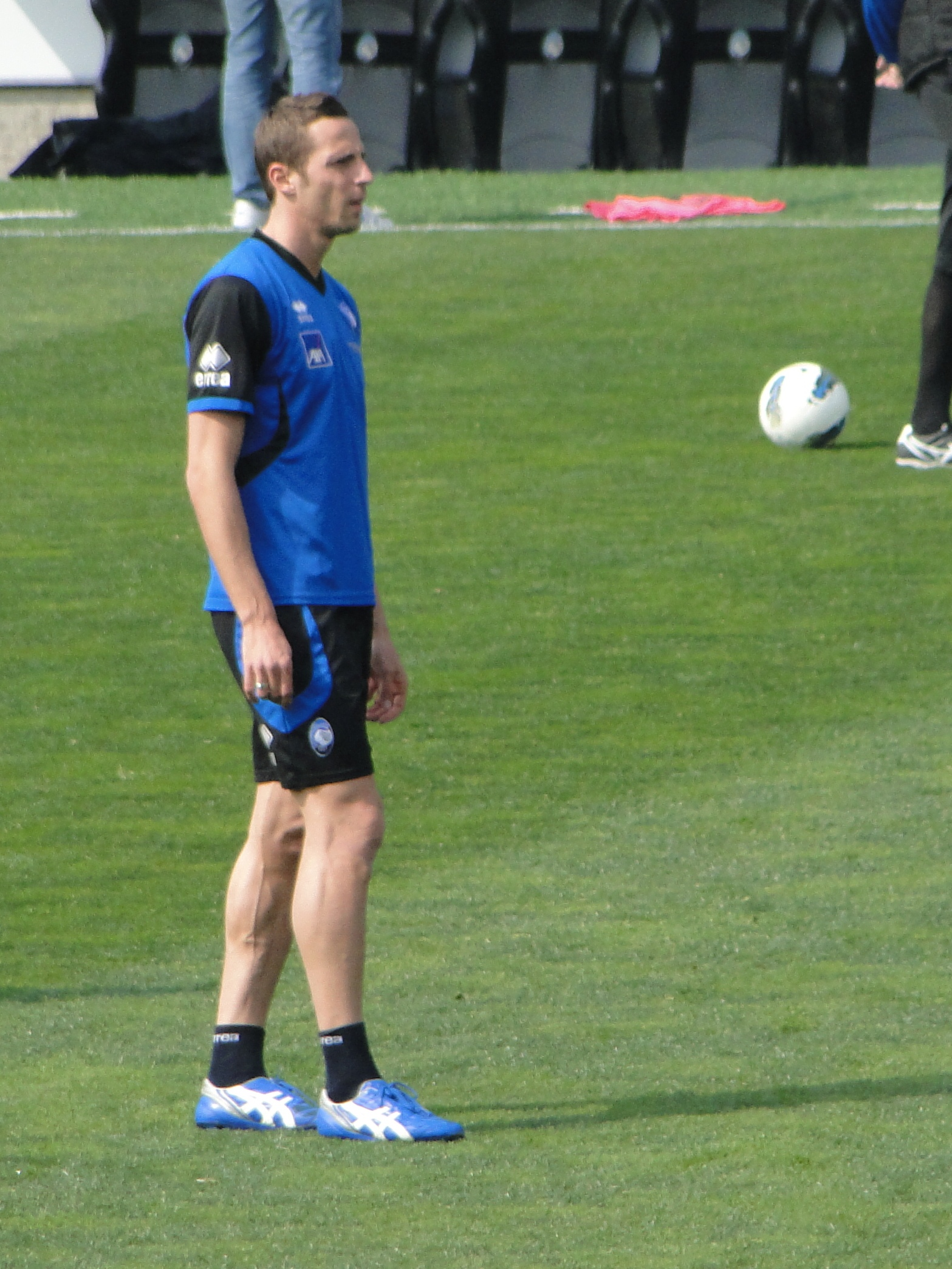
- Cazzola training with Atalanta

Personal information
- Date of birth: 8 October 1985 (age 41)
- Place of birth: Verona, Italy
- Height: 1.88 m (6 ft 2 in)
- Position: Midfielder

Youth career
- 2002–2003: San Zeno

Senior career*
Years	Team	Apps	(Gls)
2003–2004	Sambenedettese	6	(0)
2003–2004	Perugia Calcio	0	(0)
2004–2007	Pro Vastese	89	(3)
2007–2008	Arezzo Calcio	18	(0)
2008–2009	Olbia	32	(3)
2009–2010	Pergocrema	32	(0)
2010–2011	Juve Stabia	55	(3)
2011–2016	Atalanta	40	(0)
2014–2015	→ Cesena (loan)	5	(0)
2015–2016	→ Livorno (loan)	25	(2)
2016–2018	Alessandria	52	(5)
2019–2021	Virtus Verona	56	(4)
2021–2022	Giana Erminio	24	(0)
2022–2024	Virtus Bergamo	60	(1)
Total		494	(21)
- * Club domestic league appearances and goals

Riccardo Cazzola (born 8 October 1985) is an Italian former professional footballer who plays as a midfielder.

After not playing in the 2018–19 season, he joined Virtus Verona in July 2019.

On 21 July 2021 he joined to Giana Erminio.
