= Luca Cigarini =

Italian footballer (born 1986)

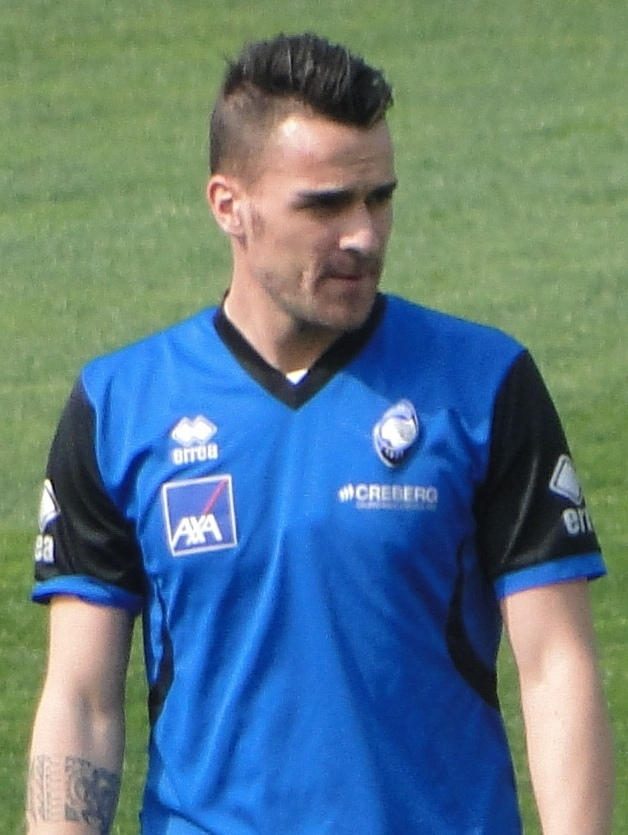
- Cigarini with Atalanta in 2012

Personal information
- Date of birth: 20 June 1986 (age 40)
- Place of birth: Montecchio Emilia, Italy
- Height: 1.75 m (5 ft 9 in)
- Position: Midfielder

Youth career
- 1997–2004: Parma

Senior career*
Years	Team	Apps	(Gls)
2004–2008	Parma	70	(4)
2004–2005	→ Sambenedettese (loan)	33	(4)
2008–2009	Atalanta	23	(3)
2009–2011	Napoli	28	(2)
2010–2011	→ Sevilla (loan)	6	(0)
2011–2016	Atalanta	150	(7)
2016–2017	Sampdoria	4	(0)
2017–2020	Cagliari	73	(2)
2020–2021	Crotone	14	(0)
2021–2025	Reggiana	79	(2)

International career
2004	Italy U18	1	(0)
2005	Italy U19	1	(0)
2005–2007	Italy U20	5	(0)
2005–2009	Italy U21	20	(1)
2008	Italy Olympic Team	8	(0)
- * Club domestic league appearances and goals

Luca Cigarini (Italian pronunciation: [ˈluːka tʃiɡaˈriːni]; born 20 June 1986) is an Italian former professional footballer who played as a midfielder.

== Club career ==
=== Parma ===
Cigarini was one of the notable youth products in the 2005 Parma squad, alongside Daniele Dessena.

=== Atalanta ===
After Parma was relegated to Serie B in June 2008, Cigarini was sold to Atalanta in join-ownership bid, for €4.5 million on 11 July.

=== Napoli ===
On 3 July 2009, Cigarini signed for Napoli from Atalanta on a five-year deal for €10.5 million. Atalanta paid Parma €3.5 million plus half the registration rights of Alessio Manzoni to sign Cigarini outright.

On 2 August 2010, Cigarini joined Sevilla FC on a loan deal for the 2010–11 season who paid €292,500 for the loan and, upon conclusion of the season, had the option to purchase the midfielder for €7 million.

=== Return to Atalanta ===
Cigarini returned to Atalanta on loan in summer 2011 for free. On 4 July 2012, the loan was renewed for €1.25 million loan fee.

On 5 July 2013, after spending two seasons on loan with Atalanta, a co-ownership deal was agreed to with Napoli for €2.75 million. Cigarini continued to play for Atalanta for the upcoming 2013–14 Serie A season. Cigarini scored his first goal of the season against Lazio on 20 October. In June 2014 Atalanta acquired Cigarini outright for €2.35 million. Atalanta paid €5.75 million transfer fee in total to re-acquire Cigarini.

=== Sampdoria ===
After spending five years with Atalanta, Cigarini made the switch from Bergamo to Genoa, signing a permanent deal with Sampdoria.

=== Cagliari ===
In 2017, Cigarini moved to Serie A rivals Cagliari in an exchange deal with Nicola Murru.

=== Crotone ===
On 8 September 2020, Cigarini signed with Crotone a 2-years contract.

=== Reggiana ===
On 23 August 2021, he signed a two-year contract with Reggiana in Serie C, returning to the third tier for the first time since his professional debut season with Sambenedettese.

== International career ==
On 7 September 2007, Cigarini scored his first ever goal (which was also the winning goal) with the Italy U-21 squad in a 2–1 victory over the Faroe Islands in a UEFA U-21 Qualifying match. He was also part of Pierluigi Casiraghi's Olympic team that won the 2008 Toulon Tournament. He also played for Italy in the 2009 UEFA European Under-21 Football Championship.

Cigarini received his first call-up to the senior team on 30 August 2010. New coach Cesare Prandelli named him in the squad for the upcoming Euro 2012 qualifiers as an injury replacement for Claudio Marchisio.

== Style of play ==
Luca Cigarini usually plays as a deep-lying playmaker in midfield, although he is also capable of playing as a central midfielder. He is mostly known for his ability to orchestrate his team's attacking moves, courtesy of his technical qualities and precise long passing. As a youngster, he was nicknamed il Professore (The Professor) by Cesare Prandelli, his Parma youth manager at the time, due to his playmaking abilities and intelligent reading of the game. The Italian sports newspaper La Gazzetta dello Sport has also stated that Cigarini has a similar vision of the game to that of fellow Italian midfielder Andrea Pirlo.

== Career statistics ==
=== Club ===
As of match played 30 April 2022

Appearances and goals by club, season and competition
Club	Season	League			Cup		Continental		Total	
Club	Season	Division	Apps	Goals	Apps	Goals	Apps	Goals	Apps	Goals
Parma	2005–06	Serie A	17	0	4	0	––		21	0
Parma	2006–07	Serie A	21	1	4	1	6	0	31	2
Parma	2007–08	Serie A	32	3	0	0	—		32	3
Parma	Total		70	4	8	1	6	0	84	5
Atalanta	2008–09	Serie A	23	3	1	0	––		24	3
Napoli	2009–10	Serie A	28	2	1	0	––		29	2
Sevilla	2010–11	La Liga	6	0	4	1	6	2	16	3
Atalanta	2011–12	Serie A	32	1	0	0	––		32	1
Atalanta	2012–13	Serie A	27	2	2	0	––		29	2
Atalanta	2013–14	Serie A	33	2	3	0	––		36	2
Atalanta	2014–15	Serie A	33	0	1	1	––		34	1
Atalanta	2015–16	Serie A	25	2	1	0	––		26	2
Atalanta	Total		150	7	7	1	0	0	157	8
Sampdoria	2016–17	Serie A	4	0	3	0	––		7	0
Cagliari	2017–18	Serie A	26	2	1	0	––		27	2
Cagliari	2018–19	Serie A	25	0	3	0	––		28	0
Cagliari	2019–20	Serie A	22	0	0	0	––		22	0
Cagliari	Total		73	2	4	0	0	0	77	2
Crotone	2020–21	Serie A	5	0	1	1	––		6	1
Reggiana	2021–22	Serie C	32	1	0	0	––		32	1
Career total			391	19	29	4	12	2	432	25

== Honours ==
Italy U21

- UEFA European Under-21 Championship bronze: 2009
