= Cristian Raimondi =

Italian footballer (born 1981)

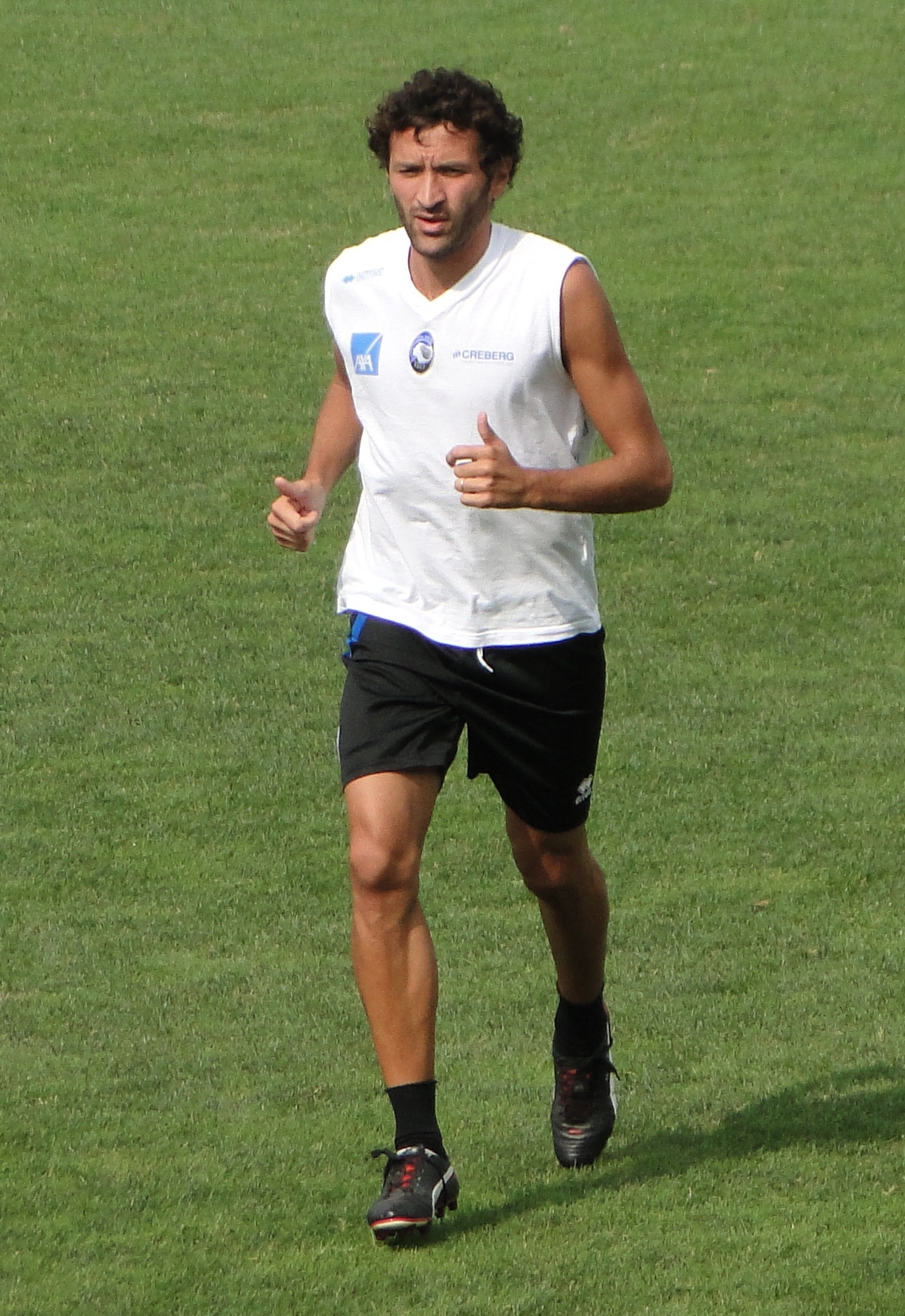

Personal information
- Date of birth: 30 April 1981 (age 45)
- Place of birth: San Giovanni Bianco, Italy
- Height: 1.82 m (6 ft 0 in)
- Position: Midfielder

Senior career*
Years	Team	Apps	(Gls)
1998–1999	Albinoleffe	16	(0)
1999–2001	Atalanta	0	(0)
2001–2004	Albinoleffe	90	(13)
2002	→ Pro Vercelli (loan)	8	(1)
2004–2006	Palermo	14	(0)
2005–2006	→ Arezzo (loan)	34	(5)
2006–2009	Vicenza	112	(10)
2009–2010	Livorno	33	(0)
2010–2017	Atalanta	126	(2)
- * Club domestic league appearances and goals

Cristian Raimondi (born 30 April 1981) is an Italian former footballer who played as a midfielder.

== Personal life ==
On 30 October 2020 he tested positive for COVID-19.
