= Davide Brivio =

Italian footballer (born 1988)

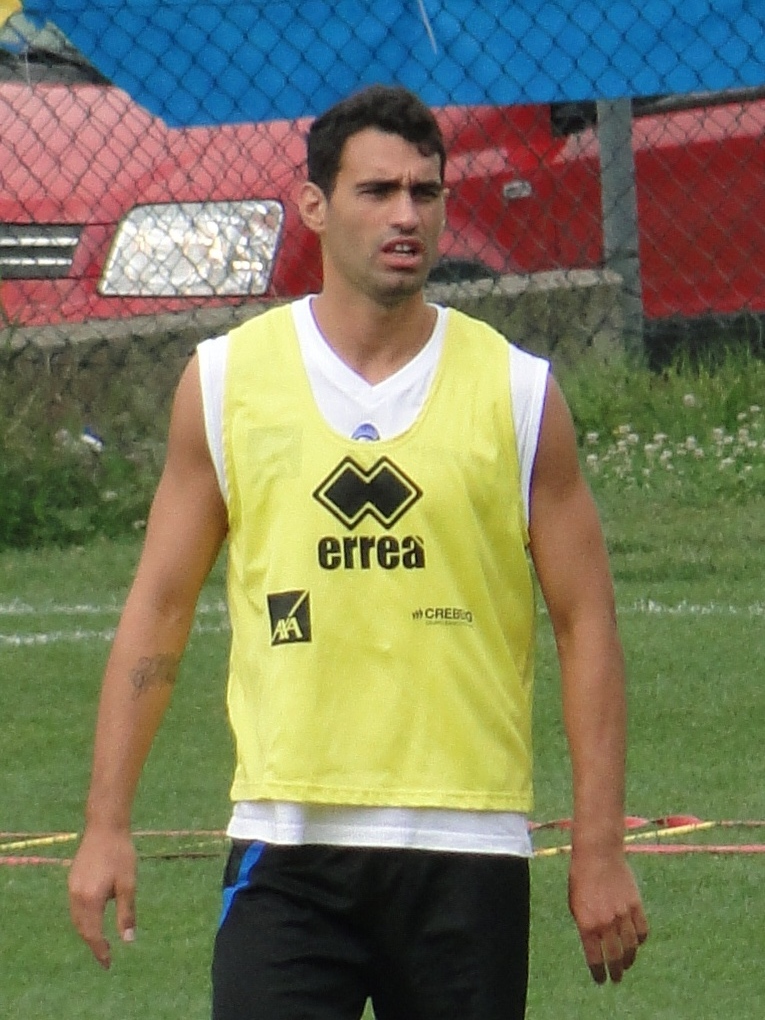

Personal information
- Full name: Davide Ernestino Brivio
- Date of birth: 17 March 1988 (age 38)
- Place of birth: Milan, Italy
- Height: 1.85 m (6 ft 1 in)
- Position: Left back

Youth career
- Atalanta

Senior career*
| Years | Team | Apps | (Gls) |
| 2005–2007 | Fiorentina | 2 | (0) |
| 2007–2010 | Vicenza | 46 | (1) |
| 2008 | → Genoa (loan) | 1 | (0) |
| 2010–2012 | Lecce | 48 | (2) |
| 2012–2016 | Atalanta | 57 | (3) |
| 2014–2015 | → Verona (loan) | 13 | (0) |
| 2016–2018 | Genoa | 0 | (0) |
| 2017–2018 | → Virtus Entella (loan) | 20 | (1) |
| 2019 | Chiasso | 13 | (1) |
| 2019–2020 | Chievo | 8 | (0) |
| 2020–2021 | Triestina | 27 | (1) |

International career
| 2003–2004 | Italy U16 | 13 | (0) |
| 2004–2005 | Italy U17 | 16 | (0) |
| 2005–2007 | Italy U19 | 7 | (0) |
| 2007 | Italy U20 | 1 | (0) |
| 2009 | Italy U21 | 3 | (0) |
- * Club domestic league appearances and goals as of 16 May 2021

Davide Ernestino Brivio (born 17 March 1988) is an Italian footballer who plays as a defender.

== Club career ==
Brivio started his professional career at Atalanta.

=== Fiorentina ===
On 30 August 2005, Brivio left Atalanta, who had just been relegated to Serie B, to join Fiorentina, who purchased half of the player's license, for €1 million.

Brivio made his Serie A debut on 15 April 2006 at home to Treviso. He played another match on 7 April 2007 against Ascoli.

Atalanta bought back all Brivio's ownership rights from Fiorentina during the summer of 2007 by blind auction for €516,000.

=== Vicenza and Lecce ===
On 7 August 2007, he was sold to Vicenza in another joint-ownership arrangement, as part of a deal that brought Simone Padoin back to Atalanta. 50% registration rights of Brivio was valued €900,000 at that time, while 50% rights of Padoin was valued for €1.9 million. On 4 January 2008 Vicenza acquired Brivio outright for another €750,000. On the same day Vicenza also acquired Zampagna for €1.9 million, as well as sold Padoin outright for €1.55 million. The overall transactions made Vicenza paid €100,000 cash in net, and the full registration rights of Padoin to Atalanta in order to acquire Brivio and Zampagna.

In summer 2008, Brivio played once in Serie B before loaned to Genoa C.F.C. But after just played once in Serie A in December, he was back to Vicenza. In July 2010, he was signed by Serie A side Lecce in a co-ownership deal, for €750,000. As part of the deal, half of the registration rights of Alain Baclet was sold to Vicenza for €400,000, as well as the loan of Raffaele Schiavi, made Brivio's deal only involved €350,000 cash.

After helping Lecce escape relegation in 2010–11 Serie A, Lecce bought the remain 50% registration rights for €750,000. Co-currently, Vicenza excised the option to sign Schiavi outright for the same price, made the deal a direct cashless swap.

=== Atalanta ===
On 6 July 2012, Brivio signed a contract with his first club Atalanta.

On 1 September 2014, Brivio was signed by Hellas Verona F.C.

=== Genoa ===
On 31 August 2016, Genoa announced that they have signed Brivio.

=== Chiasso ===
On 15 February 2019, Brivio signed with Swiss club Chiasso.

=== Chievo ===
Brivio returned to Italy for Serie B club Chievo in mid-2019.

=== Triestina ===
On 31 January 2020 he moved to Serie C club Triestina on a 1.5-year contract.

== International career ==
He was amongst the losing semi-finalists as Italy were defeated by the Netherlands in the 2005 UEFA European Under-17 Football Championship, and took part in the Italian victory over Croatia in the Third Place Playoff. He was also a member of the Italian squad in the 2005 FIFA U-17 World Championship. Brivio made his youth international debut in June 2003, the post season matches of U16 (born 1987) team.

On 12 August 2009 he made his debut with the Italy U-21 national team in a friendly game against Russia.
