= Guglielmo Stendardo =

Italian footballer

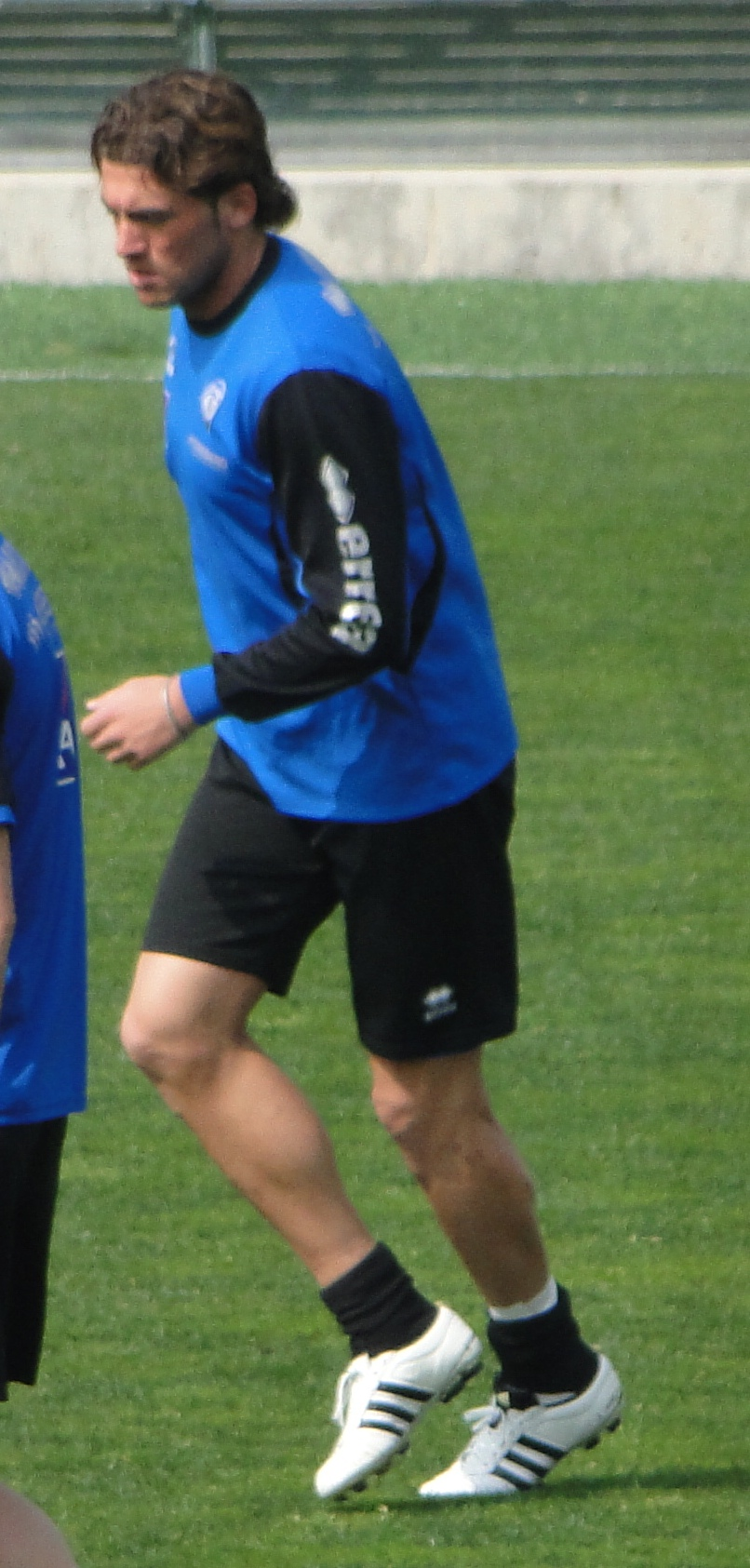

Personal information
- Date of birth: May 6, 1981 (age 45)
- Place of birth: Naples, Italy
- Height: 1.90 m (6 ft 3 in)
- Position: Centre back

Team information
- Current team: LUISS (head coach)

Senior career*
Years	Team	Apps	(Gls)
1997–1998	Napoli	1	(0)
1999–2002	Sampdoria	32	(0)
2002–2003	Salernitana	17	(4)
2003–2005	Perugia	39	(3)
2003–2004	→ Catania (loan)	42	(0)
2005–2012	Lazio	85	(6)
2008	→ Juventus (loan)	5	(1)
2008–2009	→ Lecce (loan)	21	(0)
2012	→ Atalanta (loan)	16	(0)
2012–2016	Atalanta	95	(7)
2017–2018	Pescara	10	(0)

Managerial career
- 2021–: LUISS
- * Club domestic league appearances and goals

Guglielmo Stendardo (born 6 May 1981) is an Italian football coach and former player, who played as a central defender.

He is currently in charge as head coach of Eccellenza amateurs LUISS.

== Club career ==
=== Early career ===
Stendardo began his career at Napoli in 1997 and has played for a number of top Italian football clubs, including Sampdoria, Lazio, and Juventus, as well as early spells with Salernitana and Perugia; during his time with the latter club, he was sent on loan to Catania for the 2003–04 season.

=== Journeyman: Lazio, Juventus return and Lecce ===
Stendardo was signed by S.S. Lazio in August 2005 on a free transfer. His previous club A.C. Perugia, went bankrupt at the start of the 2005–06 season. After a 3–2 defeat to Juventus in late 2007, Stendardo had a falling-out with Lazio manager Delio Rossi and demanded a transfer during the January 2008 transfer window.

In January 2008, Juventus officially announced the signing of Stendardo to a 6-month loan deal, for €400,000, with an option to buy him outright in the summer. On 1 September he was loaned to Lecce in a one-year deal, and spent the 2008–09 season with the Giallorossi with little success, as the side went relegated to Serie B.

Stendardo then returned to Lazio at the end of the season, and played 33 Serie A games for the club during the next 2 seasons.

=== Atalanta ===
After making no appearances in 2011–12, he left for Atalanta in January 2012, on loan until June. In August, he was bought outright by La Dea.

== Coaching career ==
In August 2021, Stendardo took over on his first role as a first team manager, coaching Eccellenza amateurs LUISS, the football branch of the Libera Università Internazionale degli Studi Sociali Guido Carli.

== Style of play ==
Stendardo is characterized by his physical stature and tenacity as a central defender, rather than by speed or technical proficiency. Although he is not noted for his pace or specific technical skills, Stendardo has made a name for himself as a large, tall, physically strong and tenacious central defender.

== Personal life ==
Stendardo's brother, Mariano, is also a footballer. During his playing career, Guglielmo managed to obtain a law degree; in December 2012, he was the source of controversy when he pulled out of a Coppa Italia match against Roma in order to sit an exam in Salerno for his law degree, and was subsequently fined by Atalanta.
