= 2014–15 Atalanta BC season =

Atalanta
2014–15 season
- President: Antonio Percassi
- Manager: Stefano Colantuono (until 4 March 2015); Edoardo Reja (from 4 March 2015)
- Stadium: Stadio Atleti Azzurri d'Italia
- Serie A: 17th
- Coppa Italia: Round of 16
- Top goalscorer: League: Germán Denis (8); All: Germán Denis (8)
- Highest home attendance: 22,074 vs Juventus (27 September 2014, Serie A)
- Lowest home attendance: 914 vs Avellino (3 December 2014, Coppa Italia)
- Average home league attendance: 15,160
Home colours	Away colours	Third colours

The 2014–15 season was Atalanta Bergamasca Calcio's fourth consecutive season in Serie A after having been relegated to Serie B at the end of the 2009–10 season.

== Players ==
=== Squad information ===
As of 3 May 2015

No.	Name	Pos.	Nat.	Place of birth	Date of birth (age)	Club caps	Club goals	Int. apps	Int. goals	Signed from	Date signed	Fee	Contract End
Goalkeepers
1	Vlada Avramov	GK	(Serbia)	Novi Sad	5 April 1979 (age 47)	2	0	2	0	Torino	1 September 2014	Loan	30 June 2015
24	Davide Merelli	GK	(Italy)	Manerbio	3 March 1996 (age 30)	–	–	–	–	Youth System	25 April 2015	Free	Undisclosed
57	Marco Sportiello	GK	(Italy)	Desio	10 May 1992 (age 34)	38	0	–	–	Youth System	22 June 2012	Free	30 June 2017
78	Giorgio Frezzolini	GK	(Italy)	Rome	21 January 1976 (age 50)	7	0	–	–	Ascoli	25 January 2010	Free	30 June 2016
Defenders
2	Guglielmo Stendardo	CB	(Italy)	Naples	6 May 1981 (age 45)	101	6	–	–	Lazio	9 August 2012	Free	30 June 2015
3	Cristiano Del Grosso	LB	(Italy)	Giulianova	24 March 1983 (age 43)	44	1	–	–	Siena	31 January 2013	Swap	31 June 2016
5	Lionel Scaloni	RB/RWB	(Argentina)	Rosario	16 May 1978 (age 48)	16	0	7	0	Lazio	29 January 2013	€250K	30 June 2015
6	Gianpaolo Bellini (c)	LB	(Italy)	Sarnico	27 March 1980 (age 46)	419	11	–	–	Youth System	1 July 1997	Free	30 June 2015
13	Andrea Masiello	RB	(Italy)	Viareggio	5 February 1986 (age 40)	29	1	–	–	Bari	1 July 2011	Free	30 June 2018
20	Giuseppe Biava	CB	(Italy)	Seriate	8 May 1977 (age 49)	20	2	–	–	Lazio	17 July 2014	Free	31 June 2015
22	Davide Zappacosta	RB	(Italy)	Sora	11 June 1992 (age 34)	27	3	–	–	Avellino	19 June 2014	Undisc.	30 June 2018
29	Yohan Benalouane	CB/LB	(Tunisia)	Bagnols-sur-Cèze (France)	28 March 1987 (age 39)	43	1	9	1	Parma	1 July 2014	€1M	30 June 2019
33	Nicolò Cherubin	CB	(Italy)	Vicenza	2 December 1986 (age 39)	11	0	–	–	Bologna	1 July 2014	Loan	30 June 2015
93	Boukary Dramé	LB	(Senegal)	Villepinte (France)	22 July 1985 (age 41)	29	0	2	0	Chievo	18 June 2014	Free	30 June 2017
96	Anton Krešić	CB/DM	(Croatia)	Dieburg (Germany)	29 January 1996 (age 30)	–	–	–	–	NK Zagreb (Croatia)	2 February 2015	Free	Undisclosed
98	Franck Kessié	CB/DM	(Ivory Coast)	Ouragahio	19 December 1996 (age 29)	–	–	4	0	Stella Club (Ivory Coast)	29 January 2015	Loan	30 June 2015
Midfielders
7	Marco D'Alessandro	RW/LW	(Italy)	Rome	17 February 1991 (age 35)	24	0	–	–	Roma	4 July 2014	€2M	30 June 2019
8	Giulio Migliaccio	CM/DM	(Italy)	Mugnano di Napoli	23 June 1981 (age 45)	127	6	–	–	Palermo	11 July 2013	Free	30 June 2015
10	Alejandro Gómez	LW	(Argentina)	Buenos Aires	15 February 1988 (age 38)	21	1	–	–	Metalist (Ukraine)	1 September 2014	€5M	30 June 2017
11	Maxi Moralez	AM/SS	(Argentina)	Granadero Baigorria	27 February 1987 (age 39)	127	18	1	0	Vélez (Argentina)	27 July 2011	€8M	30 June 2015
16	Daniele Baselli	CM	(Italy)	Brescia	12 March 1992 (age 34)	52	0	–	–	Cittadella	20 June 2013	€800K	30 June 2018
17	Carlos Carmona	CM/DM	(Chile)	Coquimbo	21 February 1987 (age 39)	148	5	47	1	Reggina	27 August 2010	€1.8M	30 June 2018
18	Marcelo Estigarribia	AM/LM	(Paraguay)	Fernando de la Mora	21 September 1987 (age 39)	22	2	32	1	Maldonado (Uruguay)	30 January 2014	Loan	30 June 2015
21	Luca Cigarini	CM	(Italy)	Montecchio Emilia	20 June 1986 (age 40)	152	9	–	–	Napoli	5 July 2013	€2.2M	30 June 2018
28	Urby Emanuelson	LW/LB	(Netherlands)	Amsterdam	16 June 1986 (age 40)	8	0	16	0	Roma	30 January 2015	Free	30 June 2015
77	Cristian Raimondi	RM/RB	(Italy)	San Giovanni Bianco	30 April 1981 (age 45)	103	1	–	–	Livorno	7 August 2010	€1M	30 June 2015
95	Alberto Grassi	DM/CM	(Italy)	Brescia	7 March 1995 (age 31)	2	0	–	–	Youth System	1 July 2014	Free	30 June 2015
Forwards
9	Rolando Bianchi	ST	(Italy)	Lovere	15 February 1983 (age 43)	46	2	–	–	Bologna	5 August 2014	Loan	30 June 2015
19	Germán Denis	ST	(Argentina)	Remedios de Escalada	10 September 1981 (age 45)	141	52	5	0	Udinese	18 July 2012	€2.35M	30 June 2017
27	Lorenzo Rosseti	SS/AM	(Italy)	Arezzo	5 August 1994 (age 32)	1	0	–	–	Juventus	29 August 2014	Loan	30 June 2015
34	Nicolas Napol	SS/LW/RW	(Belgium)	Paris (France)	3 April 1996 (age 30)	–	–	–	–	Youth System	1 December 2014	Free	30 June 2018
35	David Forgács	SS/LW	(Hungary)	Szeged	29 August 1995 (age 31)	–	–	–	–	Youth System	1 December 2014	Free	30 June 2015
51	Mauricio Pinilla	ST/SS	(Chile)	Santiago	4 February 1984 (age 42)	12	5	33	6	Genoa	8 January 2015	Loan	30 June 2015
99	Richmond Boakye	SS/ST	(Ghana)	Agogo	28 January 1993 (age 33)	21	5	7	2	Juventus	22 July 2014	Loan	30 June 2015

== Transfers ==
Only first-team transfers (mainly players who appeared with the main squad in the previous campaign) are listed. Youth and/or reserve loans are excluded.

=== In ===
No.	Pos.	Nat.	Name	Age	EU	Moving from	Type	Transfer window	Ends	Transfer fee	Source
93	DF	(Senegal)	Boukary Dramé	28	EU	Chievo	Transfer	Summer	2017	Free	
22	DF	(Italy)	Davide Zappacosta	22	EU	Avellino	Co-ownership	Summer	2018	Renewed	
31	MF	(Italy)	Salvatore Molina	22	EU	Modena	Loan Return	Summer	2018	Free	
33	DF	(Italy)	Nicolò Cherubin	27	EU	Bologna	Loan	Summer	2015	€300K	
7	MF	(Italy)	Marco D'Alessandro	23	EU	Roma	Transfer	Summer	2019	€2M	
29	DF	(Italy)	Yohan Benalouane	27	EU	Parma	Transfer	Summer	2019	€1M	
20	DF	(Italy)	Giuseppe Biava	37	EU	Lazio	Transfer	Summer	2015	Free	
99	FW	(Ghana)	Richmond Boakye	21	EU	Juventus	Loan	Summer	2015	Free	
9	FW	(Italy)	Rolando Bianchi	31	EU	Bologna	Loan	Summer	2015	Free	
25	MF	(Italy)	Leonardo Spinazzola	21	EU	Juventus	Loan	Summer	2015	Free	
27	FW	(Italy)	Valerio Rosseti	20	EU	Juventus	Loan	Summer	2015	Free	
1	GK	(Serbia)	Vlada Avramov	35	EU	Torino	Loan	Summer	2015	Free	
10	MF	(Argentina)	Alejandro Gómez	26	Non-EU	Metalist Kharkiv (Ukraine)	Transfer	Summer	2017	€5M	
51	FW	(Chile)	Mauricio Pinilla	31	EU	Genoa	Loan	Winter	2015	Free	
96	DF	(Croatia)	Anton Krešić	19	Non-EU	NK Zagreb (Croatia)	Transfer	Winter	Undisclosed	Free	
98	DF	(Ivory Coast)	Franck Kessié	18	Non-EU	Stella Club (Ivory Coast)	Loan	Winter	2015	Free	
28	MF	(Netherlands)	Urby Emanuelson	28	EU	Roma	Transfer	Winter	2015	Free	

Total spending: ▼€8,300,000

=== Out ===
No.	Pos.	Nat.	Name	Age	EU	Moving to	Type	Transfer window	Transfer fee	Source
7	FW	(Croatia)	Marko Livaja	20	EU	Rubin Kazan (Russia)	Transfer	Summer	€6.5M	
33	DF	(Colombia)	Mario Yepes	38	EU	San Lorenzo (Argentina)	Contract Ended	Summer	Free	
	GK	(Italy)	Simone Colombi	23	EU	Cagliari	Transfer	Summer	€1M	
15	DF	(Italy)	Mattia Caldara	20	EU	Trapani	Loan	Summer	Free	
90	MF	(Ivory Coast)	Moussa Koné	24	EU	Avellino	Loan	Summer	Free	
93	DF	(Romania)	Constantin Nica	21	EU	Cesena	Loan	Summer	Free	
	MF	(Italy)	Nadir Minotti	22	EU	Crotone	Loan	Summer	Free	
	DF	(Italy)	Alberto Almici	21	EU	Latina	Loan	Summer	Free	
	DF	(Italy)	Matteo Contini	34	EU	Bari	Loan	Summer	Free	
91	FW	(Italy)	Giuseppe De Luca	22	EU	Bari	Loan	Summer	Free	
3	DF	(Italy)	Stefano Lucchini	33	EU	Cesena	Transfer	Summer	€100K	
	MF	(Italy)	Matteo Scozzarella	26	EU	Trapani	Loan	Summer	Free	
	MF	(Italy)	Antonio Palma	20	EU	Cittadella	Loan	Summer	Free	
5	MF	(Italy)	Luigi Giorgi	27	EU	Cesena	Loan	Summer	Free	
	DF	(Italy)	Daniele Capelli	26	EU	Cesena	Loan Renewal	Summer	Free	
44	MF	(Italy)	Riccardo Cazzola	28	EU	Cesena	Loan	Summer	Free	
89	FW	(Italy)	Guido Marilungo	24	EU	Cesena	Loan Renewal	Summer	Free	
	DF	(Italy)	Michele Canini	29	EU	FC Tokyo (Japan)	Loan	Summer	Free	
9	FW	(Uruguay)	Rubén Bentancourt	21	Non-EU	Bologna	Loan	Summer	Free	
	FW	(Italy)	Matteo Ardemagni	27	EU	Spezia	Loan	Summer	Free	
	FW	(Italy)	Franco Brienza	35	EU	Cesena	Transfer	Summer	€100K	
28	DF	(Italy)	Davide Brivio	26	EU	Hellas Verona	Loan	Summer	Free	
10	MF	(Italy)	Giacomo Bonaventura	25	EU	Milan	Transfer	Summer	€7M	
47	GK	(Italy)	Andrea Consigli	27	EU	Sassuolo	Transfer	Summer	€3M	
61	MF	(Italy)	Roberto Gagliardini	20	EU	Spezia	Loan	Summer	Free	
25	MF	(Italy)	Leonardo Spinazzola	21	EU	Juventus	Loan Return	Winter	Free	
95	MF	(Sweden)	Joakim Olausson	19	EU	BK Häcken (Sweden)	Transfer	Winter	Free	

Total gaining: ▲€17,700,000

== Competitions ==
=== Serie A ===
==== League table ====
Pos	Team	Pld	W	D	L	GF	GA	GD	Pts	Qualification or relegation
15	Empoli	38	8	18	12	46	52	−6	42	
16	Udinese	38	10	11	17	43	56	−13	41	
17	Atalanta	38	7	16	15	38	57	−19	37	
18	Cagliari (R)	38	8	10	20	48	68	−20	34	Relegation to Serie B
19	Cesena (R)	38	4	12	22	36	73	−37	24	Relegation to Serie B

Source: 2014–15 Serie A, 2014-15 Serie A classification.
Rules for classification: 1) points; 2) head-to-head points; 3) head-to-head goal difference; 4) goal difference; 5) number of goals scored; 6) draw. (Head-to-head record is applied for clubs with the same number of points only once all matches between said clubs have been played.).
(R) Relegated

==== Results summary ====
Overall								Home						Away					
Pld	W	D	L	GF	GA	GD	Pts	W	D	L	GF	GA	GD	W	D	L	GF	GA	GD
38	7	16	15	38	57	−19	37	4	7	8	22	33	−11	3	9	7	16	24	−8

Last updated: 31 May 2015.
Source: Competitive matches

==== Results by round ====
Round	1	2	3	4	5	6	7	8	9	10	11	12	13	14	15	16	17	18	19	20	21	22	23	24	25	26	27	28	29	30	31	32	33	34	35	36	37	38
Ground	H	A	H	A	H	A	H	A	H	A	A	H	A	H	A	H	A	H	A	A	H	A	H	A	H	A	H	A	H	H	A	H	A	H	A	H	A	H
Result	D	W	L	L	L	L	W	L	D	D	D	L	D	W	L	D	D	D	W	L	W	L	L	L	L	D	D	D	L	W	D	D	D	D	W	L	D	L
Position	6	6	8	8	16	17	13	16	16	16	17	17	17	14	16	17	17	17	15	15	15	16	17	17	17	17	17	17	17	17	17	17	17	17	17	17	17	17

Updated to match(es) played on 31 May 2015. Source: Competitive matches
A = Away; H = Home; W = Win; D = Draw; L = Loss

==== Matches ====
31 August 2014 1	Atalanta	0–0	Hellas Verona	Bergamo
18:00 CEST (UTC+02:00)	Dramé (yellow card) 84'; Boakye (yellow card) 86'	Report	Hallfreðsson (yellow card) 35'; Christodoulopoulos (yellow card) 70'; Ioniță (yellow card) 85'	Stadium: Stadio Atleti Azzurri d'Italia; Attendance: 14,925; Referee: Nicola Rizzoli

14 September 2014 2	Cagliari	1–2	Atalanta	Cagliari
15:00 CEST (UTC+02:00)	Conti (yellow card) 24'; Crisetig (yellow card) 40'; Avelar (yellow card) 57'; Ibarbo (yellow card) 72'; Cossu 85' (pen.)	Report	Estigarribia 4', (yellow card) 39'; D'Alessandro (yellow card) 45'; Boakye 67'; Dramé (yellow card) 87'; Cigarini (yellow card) 90+2'	Stadium: Stadio Sant'Elia; Attendance: 9,100; Referee: Angelo Cervellera

21 September 2014 3	Atalanta	0–1	Fiorentina	Bergamo
18:00 CEST (UTC+02:00)	Carmona (yellow card) 27'	Report	Gonzalo (yellow card) 48'; Kurtić 58'; Fernández (yellow card) 60'; Aquilani (yellow card) 67'; Gómez (yellow card) 90'	Stadium: Stadio Atleti Azzurri d'Italia; Attendance: 15,376; Referee: Carmine Russo

24 September 2014 4	Internazionale	2–0	Atalanta	Milan
20:45 CEST (UTC+02:00)	Osvaldo 40'; Kovačić (yellow card) 74'; Hernanes 87'	Report	Carmona (yellow card) 28'; Benalouane (yellow card) 29'; Boakye (yellow card) 89'	Stadium: San Siro; Attendance: 29,535; Referee: Andrea Gervasoni

27 September 2014 5	Atalanta	0–3	Juventus	Bergamo
20:45 CEST (UTC+02:00)	Benalouane (yellow card) 20'; Molina (yellow card) 73'	Report	Marchisio (yellow card) 30'; Tevez 35', 59'; Chiellini (yellow card) 58'; Evra (yellow card) 74'; Morata 83'	Stadium: Stadio Atleti Azzurri d'Italia; Attendance: 22,074; Referee: Daniele Orsato

5 October 2014 6	Sampdoria	1–0	Atalanta	Genoa
15:00 CEST (UTC+02:00)	Gabbiadini 35'; De Silvestri (yellow card) 57'; Soriano (yellow card) 75'; Romagnoli (yellow card) 87'	Report	Benalouane (yellow card) 55'; Biava (yellow card) 73'; Moralez (yellow card) 75'	Stadium: Stadio Luigi Ferraris; Attendance: 20,050; Referee: Massimiliano Irrati

19 October 2014 7	Atalanta	1–0	Parma	Bergamo
15:00 CEST (UTC+02:00)	Carmona (yellow card) 26'; Zappacosta (yellow card) 30'; Boakye 90'	Report	Mendes (yellow card) 64'; Mauri (yellow card) 70'; Galloppa (yellow card) 90+3'	Stadium: Stadio Atleti Azzurri d'Italia; Attendance: 14,944; Referee: Marco Guida

26 October 2014 8	Udinese	2–0	Atalanta	Udine
15:00 CET (UTC+01:00)	Di Natale 6'; Théréau 36'; Kone (yellow card) 43'; Guilherme (yellow card) 76'	Report	Cigarini (yellow card) 88'	Stadium: Stadio Friuli; Attendance: 8,300; Referee: Dino Tommasi

29 October 2014 9	Atalanta	1–1	Napoli	Bergamo
20:45 CET (UTC+01:00)	Benalouane (yellow card) 10'; Denis 57'; Cigarini (yellow card) 63' (yellow-red card) 83'; Raimondi (yellow card) 66'; Stendardo (yellow card) 90+1'	Report	Ghoulam (yellow card) 45'; Mertens (yellow card) 67'; Higuaín 86'	Stadium: Stadio Atleti Azzurri d'Italia; Attendance: 14,882; Referee: Antonio Damato

2 November 2014 10	Torino	0–0	Atalanta	Turin
15:00 CET (UTC+01:00)		Report	Dramé (yellow card) 35'; Stendardo (yellow card) 38'; Migliaccio (yellow card) 60'; Baselli (yellow card) 64'; Carmona (yellow card) 88'	Stadium: Stadio Olimpico di Torino; Attendance: 13,489; Referee: Angelo Cervellera

8 November 2014 11	Sassuolo	0–0	Atalanta	Reggio Emilia
18:00 CET (UTC+01:00)	Magnanelli (yellow card) 15'; Berardi (yellow card) 30'; Vrsaljko (yellow card) 90+2'	Report	Benalouane (yellow card) 26'	Stadium: Mapei Stadium – Città del Tricolore; Attendance: 10,776; Referee: Fabrizio Pasqua

22 November 2014 12	Atalanta	1–2	Roma	Bergamo
18:00 CET (UTC+01:00)	Moralez 1', (yellow card) 19'; Carmona (yellow card) 14'; Boakye (yellow card) 90+5' (red card) 90+5'	Report	Nainggolan (yellow card) 3', (goal) 42'; Ljajić 23'; Pjanić (yellow card) 50'; Astori (yellow card) 63'; Somma (yellow card) 80'; Keita (yellow card) 86'	Stadium: Stadio Atleti Azzurri d'Italia; Attendance: 17,286; Referee: Davide Massa

30 November 2014 13	Empoli	0–0	Atalanta	Empoli
15:00 CET (UTC+01:00)	Croce (yellow card) 5'; Tavano (yellow card) 73'	Report	Dramé (yellow card) 29'; Cigarini (yellow card) 83'; Migliaccio (yellow card) 90'	Stadium: Stadio Carlo Castellani; Attendance: 6,938; Referee: Sebastiano Peruzzo

7 December 2014 14	Atalanta	3–2	Cesena	Bergamo
15:00 CET (UTC+01:00)	Carmona (yellow card) 13'; Benalouane 45+1', (yellow card) 83'; Stendardo 50'; Moralez 52'; Sportiello (yellow card) 89'	Report	Defrel 31', 43', (yellow card) 33'; Lucchini (yellow card) 49'; Giorgi (yellow card) 62'; De Feudis (yellow card) 74'; Renzetti (yellow card) 90'	Stadium: Stadio Atleti Azzurri d'Italia; Attendance: 12,495; Referee: Marco Di Bello

13 December 2014 15	Lazio	3–0	Atalanta	Rome
20:45 CET (UTC+01:00)	Mauri 51', 71'; Lulić 81'	Report	Denis (yellow card) 37'; Migliaccio (yellow card) 48'	Stadium: Stadio Olimpico; Attendance: 24,477; Referee: Gianluca Rocchi

21 December 2014 16	Atalanta	3–3	Palermo	Bergamo
15:00 CET (UTC+01:00)	Benalouane (yellow card) 20'; Baselli (yellow card) 25'; Denis 40' (pen.), 76'; Moralez 55'; Carmona (yellow card) 64'; Bianchi (yellow card) 79'; Cigarini (yellow card) 84'	Report	Rigoni 6'; Vázquez 16', 45+1'; González (yellow card) 33'; Della Rocca (yellow card) 90+2'	Stadium: Stadio Atleti Azzurri d'Italia; Attendance: 12,344; Referee: Daniele Orsato

6 January 2015 17	Genoa	2–2	Atalanta	Genoa
15:00 CET (UTC+01:00)	Burdisso (yellow card) 9'; Roncaglia (yellow card) 13'; Falque 51' (pen.); Matri 69', (yellow card) 85'; Costa (yellow card) 90+2'	Report	Baselli (yellow card) 9'; Dramé (yellow card) 19'; Zappacosta 37'; Moralez 49'; Benalouane (yellow card) 51'; D'Alessandro (yellow card) 52'	Stadium: Stadio Luigi Ferraris; Attendance: 18,415; Referee: Massimiliano Irrati

11 January 2015 18	Atalanta	1–1	Chievo	Bergamo
15:00 CET (UTC+01:00)	Zappacosta (yellow card) 25', (goal) 72'; Dramé (yellow card) 81'; Biava (yellow card) 84'; Bellini (yellow card) 86' (yellow-red card) 89'	Report	Lazarević 90'	Stadium: Stadio Atleti Azzurri d'Italia; Attendance: 11,876; Referee: Paolo Valeri

18 January 2015 19	Milan	0–1	Atalanta	Milan
15:00 CET (UTC+01:00)	Abate (yellow card) 45'; Rami (yellow card) 54'	Report	Denis 33', (yellow card) 41'; Stendardo (yellow card) 48'; Sportiello (yellow card) 72'; Cigarini (yellow card) 78'; Benalouane (yellow card) 87'	Stadium: San Siro; Attendance: 27,836; Referee: Carmine Russo

25 January 2015 20	Hellas Verona	1–0	Atalanta	Verona
15:00 CET (UTC+01:00)	Sørensen (yellow card) 15'; Saviola 53'; Hallfreðsson (yellow card) 86'	Report	Denis (yellow card) 12'; Baselli (yellow card) 90+1'	Stadium: Stadio Marc'Antonio Bentegodi; Attendance: 16,857; Referee: Daniele Doveri

31 January 2015 21	Atalanta	2–1	Cagliari	Bergamo
15:00 CET (UTC+01:00)	Biava 18'; Cigarini (yellow card) 19'; Pinilla (yellow card) 22', (goal) 90+4'	Report	González (yellow card) 17'; Dessena 44'; Longo (yellow card) 45'	Stadium: Stadio Atleti Azzurri d'Italia; Attendance: 12,353; Referee: Daniele Orsato

8 February 2015 22	Fiorentina	3–2	Atalanta	Florence
12:30 CET (UTC+01:00)	Basanta 18'; Diamanti 76'; Pasqual 89'; Gómez (yellow card) 90+2'	Report	Zappacosta 9'; Bellini (yellow card) 40'; Boakye 83'	Stadium: Stadio Artemio Franchi; Attendance: 27,018; Referee: Dino Tommasi

15 February 2015 23	Atalanta	1–4	Internazionale	Bergamo
15:00 CET (UTC+01:00)	Carmona (yellow card) 22'; Moralez 27', (yellow card) 33'; Pinilla (yellow card) 43'; Benalouane (yellow card) 52' (yellow-red card) 53'	Report	Shaqiri 2' (pen.), (yellow card) 33'; Juan (yellow card) 19'; Guarín 37', 63'; Palacio 72'	Stadium: Stadio Atleti Azzurri d'Italia; Attendance: 13,765; Referee: Luca Banti

20 February 2015 24	Juventus	2–1	Atalanta	Turin
20:45 CET (UTC+01:00)	Llorente 39'; Pirlo 45'; Marchisio (yellow card) 55'; Padoin (yellow card) 60'; Pereyra (yellow card) 85'; Lichtsteiner (yellow card) 87'; Morata (yellow card) 90+3'	Report	Migliaccio 25', (yellow card) 89'; Baselli (yellow card) 43'; Bellini (yellow card) 81'	Stadium: Juventus Stadium; Attendance: 37,195; Referee: Massimiliano Irrati

1 March 2015 25	Atalanta	1–2	Sampdoria	Bergamo
15:00 CET (UTC+01:00)	Stendardo 16', (yellow card) 50'; D'Alessandro (yellow card) 87'	Report	Regini (yellow card) 24'; Muriel 68'; Viviano (yellow card) 77'; Okaka 81', (yellow card) 82'; Eto'o (yellow card) 90+3'	Stadium: Stadio Atleti Azzurri d'Italia; Attendance: 16,180; Referee: Antonio Damato

8 March 2015 26	Parma	0–0	Atalanta	Parma
15:00 CET (UTC+01:00)	Lucarelli (yellow card) 2'; Rodríguez (yellow card) 78' (yellow-red card) 87'	Report	D'Alessandro (yellow card) 56'; Pinilla (yellow card) 90+2'	Stadium: Stadio Ennio Tardini; Attendance: 10,418; Referee: Marco Di Bello

15 March 2015 27	Atalanta	0–0	Udinese	Bergamo
15:00 CET (UTC+01:00)	Biava (yellow card) 32'; Cigarini (yellow card) 43'; Carmona (red card) 76'	Report	Pasquale (yellow card) 50'; Pinzi (yellow card) 61'; Badu (yellow card) 89'	Stadium: Stadio Atleti Azzurri d'Italia; Attendance: 14,073; Referee: Gianluca Rocchi

22 March 2015 28	Napoli	1–1	Atalanta	Naples
20:45 CET (UTC+01:00)	Britos (yellow card) 23'; Higuaín (yellow card) 78'; Zapata 89'; Maggio (yellow card) 90+3'; Inler (yellow card) 90+3'	Report	Zappacosta (yellow card) 32'; Gómez (yellow card) 34' (yellow-red card) 55'; Denis (yellow card) 57'; Pinilla 72', (yellow card) 90+1'; Sportiello (yellow card) 90+5'	Stadium: Stadio San Paolo; Attendance: 30,820; Referee: Gianpaolo Calvarese

4 April 2015 29	Atalanta	1–2	Torino	Bergamo
15:00 CEST (UTC+02:00)	Carmona (yellow card) 45'; Migliaccio (yellow card) 57'; Masiello (yellow card) 70'; Pinilla 74', (red card) 90+2'	Report	Quagliarella 20'; Glik 39'; Peres (yellow card) 45+1'; Amauri (yellow card) 65'; Darmian (yellow card) 71'; Gazzi (yellow card) 74'; Padelli (yellow card) 87'; Basha (red card) 90+2'	Stadium: Stadio Atleti Azzurri d'Italia; Attendance: 15,718; Referee: Marco Guida

12 April 2015 30	Atalanta	2–1	Sassuolo	Bergamo
15:00 CEST (UTC+02:00)	Biava (yellow card) 21' (yellow-red card) 81'; Denis 42', 63' (pen.); Carmona (yellow card) 55'; Cigarini (yellow card) 67'	Report	Berardi 59', (yellow card) 90+3'; Missiroli (yellow card) 65' (yellow-red card) 71'	Stadium: Stadio Atleti Azzurri d'Italia; Attendance: 15,311; Referee: Daniele Doveri

19 April 2015 31	Roma	1–1	Atalanta	Rome
15:00 CEST (UTC+02:00)	Totti 3' (pen.); Paredes (yellow card) 48'; Astori (yellow card) 65'; Yanga-Mbiwa (yellow card) 67'; Ibarbo (yellow card) 90'	Report	Denis 23' (pen.); Baselli (yellow card) 25'; Benalouane (yellow card) 41'; Dramé (yellow card) 63'; Migliaccio (yellow card) 72'; Stendardo (yellow card) 83'	Stadium: Stadio Olimpico; Attendance: 35,088; Referee: Andrea Gervasoni

26 April 2015 32	Atalanta	2–2	Empoli	Bergamo
12:30 CEST (UTC+02:00)	Benalouane (yellow card) 33'; Gómez 43'; Cigarini (yellow card) 61'; D'Alessandro (yellow card) 85'; Denis 90+3'	Report	Saponara 41'; Pucciarelli (yellow card) 56'; Maccarone 60'	Stadium: Stadio Atleti Azzurri d'Italia; Attendance: 13,651; Referee: Angelo Cervellera

29 April 2015 33	Cesena	2–2	Atalanta	Cesena
20:45 CEST (UTC+02:00)	Mundingayi (yellow card) 36'; Carbonero (yellow card) 45', (goal) 70'; Brienza 56' (pen.); Perico (yellow card) 64'	Report	Pinilla 50', 82', (yellow card) 90+5'; Benalouane (yellow card) 55'; Migliaccio (yellow card) 86'; Carmona (yellow card) 88'	Stadium: Stadio Dino Manuzzi; Attendance: 14,170; Referee: Nicola Rizzoli

3 May 2015 34	Atalanta	1–1	Lazio	Bergamo
15:00 CEST (UTC+02:00)	Masiello (yellow card) 32'; Biava 49'; Sportiello (yellow card) 85'	Report	Anderson (yellow card) 33'; Cataldi (yellow card) 37'; Ciani (yellow card) 45'; Basta (yellow card) 73'; Parolo 77'; Perea (yellow card) 80'; Maurício (yellow card) 90+5'	Stadium: Stadio Atleti Azzurri d'Italia; Attendance: 15,479; Referee: Daniele Orsato

10 May 2015 35	Palermo	2–3	Atalanta	Palermo
15:00 CEST (UTC+02:00)	González (yellow card) 20'; Vázquez 43'; Rigoni 68'	Report	Baselli 6'; Anđelković 17' (o.g.); Zappacosta (yellow card) 24'; Biava (yellow card) 36'; Gómez 51'; Avramov (red card) 56'	Stadium: Stadio Renzo Barbera; Attendance: 13,792; Referee: Gianpaolo Calvarese

17 May 2015 36	Atalanta	1–4	Genoa	Bergamo
15:00 CEST (UTC+02:00)	Pinilla 18' (pen.), (yellow card) 86'; Migliaccio (yellow card) 54'; Carmona (yellow card) 71'	Report	Pavoletti 30'; Izzo (yellow card) 48'; Bertolacci 57'; Falque 61', 73'	Stadium: Stadio Atleti Azzurri d'Italia; Attendance: 16,881; Referee: Andrea Gervasoni

24 May 2015 37	Chievo	1–1	Atalanta	Verona
15:00 CEST (UTC+02:00)	Cesar (yellow card) 41'; Pellissier 88'	Report	Gómez 48'	Stadium: Stadio Marc'Antonio Bentegodi; Attendance: 7,000; Referee: Juan Luca Sacchi

30 May 2015 38	Atalanta	1–3	Milan	Bergamo
20:45 CEST (UTC+02:00)	Baselli 21'; Masiello (yellow card) 58'; Cigarini (yellow card) 60'; D'Alessandro (yellow card) 89'	Report	Pazzini 36' (pen.); Bonaventura 38', 80'	Stadium: Stadio Atleti Azzurri d'Italia; Attendance: 18,426; Referee: Riccardo Pinzani

=== Coppa Italia ===
23 August 2014 Third round	Atalanta	2–0	Pisa	Bergamo
18:00 CEST (UTC+02:00)	Cigarini 9'; Spinazzola 81'			Stadium: Stadio Atleti Azzurri d'Italia; Attendance: 5,619; Referee: Aleandro Di Paolo

3 December 2014 Fourth round	Atalanta	2–0	Avellino	Bergamo
15:00 CET (UTC+01:00)	Boakye 13', 19'; Benalouane (yellow card) 23'; Baselli (yellow card) 35'; Bellini (yellow card) 43'; Migliaccio (yellow card) 55'	Report	Pozzebon (yellow card) 16'; Ely (yellow card) 23'; Vergara (yellow card) 73'	Stadium: Stadio Atleti Azzurri d'Italia; Attendance: 914; Referee: Daniele Minelli

21 January 2015 Round of 16	Fiorentina	3–1	Atalanta	Florence
18:00 CET (UTC+01:00)	Gómez 6', 28'; Cuadrado 12' (pen.); Alonso (yellow card) 81' (yellow-red card) 84'	Report	Boakye (yellow card) 34'; Bianchi 40'; Baselli (yellow card) 56'; Gómez (yellow card) 68'; Biava (yellow card) 71'; Scaloni (yellow card) 90+5'	Stadium: Stadio Artemio Franchi; Attendance: 19,605; Referee: Paolo Valeri

== Statistics ==
=== Appearances and goals ===
No.	Pos	Nat	Player	Total		Serie A		Coppa Italia	
No.	Pos	Nat	Player	Apps	Goals	Apps	Goals	Apps	Goals
Goalkeepers
1	GK	(Serbia) SRB	Vlada Avramov	3	0	1	0	2	0
24	GK	(Italy) ITA	Davide Merelli	0	0	0	0	0	0
57	GK	(Italy) ITA	Marco Sportiello	37	0	37	0	0	0
78	GK	(Italy) ITA	Giorgio Frezzolini	1	0	0+1	0	0	0
Defenders
2	DF	(Italy) ITA	Guglielmo Stendardo	25	2	23+1	2	1	0
3	DF	(Italy) ITA	Cristiano Del Grosso	13	0	9+4	0	0	0
5	DF	(Argentina) ARG	Lionel Scaloni	5	0	1+2	0	2	0
6	DF	(Italy) ITA	Gianpaolo Bellini	17	0	15	0	2	0
13	DF	(Italy) ITA	Andrea Masiello	14	0	12+2	0	0	0
20	DF	(Italy) ITA	Giuseppe Biava	21	2	18	2	2+1	0
26	DF	(Italy) ITA	Davide Zappacosta	30	3	27+2	3	1	0
32	DF	(Tunisia) TUN	Yohan Benalouane	29	1	25+2	1	2	0
33	DF	(Italy) ITA	Nicolò Cherubin	13	0	10+3	0	0	0
93	DF	(Senegal) SEN	Boukary Dramé	32	0	27+2	0	2+1	0
Midfielders
7	MF	(Italy) ITA	Marco D'Alessandro	27	0	9+16	0	0+2	0
8	MF	(Italy) ITA	Giulio Migliaccio	22	1	12+8	1	2	0
10	MF	(Argentina) ARG	Alejandro Gómez	25	3	18+6	3	1	0
11	MF	(Argentina) ARG	Maxi Moralez	31	5	26+4	5	1	0
16	MF	(Italy) ITA	Daniele Baselli	24	2	15+7	2	2	0
17	MF	(Chile) CHI	Carlos Carmona	34	0	32+1	0	1	0
18	MF	(Paraguay) PAR	Marcelo Estigarribia	10	1	8+1	1	1	0
21	MF	(Italy) ITA	Luca Cigarini	34	0	30+3	0	1	0
28	MF	(Netherlands) NED	Urby Emanuelson	9	0	4+5	0	0	0
77	MF	(Italy) ITA	Cristian Raimondi	6	0	4+2	0	0	0
95	MF	(Italy) ITA	Alberto Grassi	4	0	2+1	0	0+1	0
Forwards
9	FW	(Italy) ITA	Rolando Bianchi	24	1	3+18	0	2+1	1
19	FW	(Argentina) ARG	Germán Denis	33	8	27+5	8	1	0
27	FW	(Italy) ITA	Lorenzo Rosseti	2	0	0+1	0	0+1	0
51	FW	(Chile) CHI	Mauricio Pinilla	14	6	12+2	6	0	0
99	FW	(Ghana) GHA	Richmond Boakye	22	5	8+11	3	2+1	2
Players transferred out during the season
10	MF	(Italy) ITA	Giacomo Bonaventura	1	0	1	0	0	0
25	MF	(Italy) ITA	Leonardo Spinazzola	5	1	0+2	0	2+1	1
31	MF	(Italy) ITA	Salvatore Molina	5	0	2+2	0	1	0
47	GK	(Italy) ITA	Andrea Consigli	1	0	0	0	1	0

Last updated: 30 May 2015
Source: Competitions
