= 2014–15 AC Cesena season =

Cesena
2014–15 season
- President: Giorgio Lugaresi
- Manager: Pierpaolo Bisoli (until 8 December 2014); Domenico Di Carlo (from 8 December 2014)
- Stadium: Stadio Dino Manuzzi
- Serie A: 19th (relegated)
- Coppa Italia: Fourth round
- Top goalscorer: League: Grégoire Defrel (9); All: Grégoire Defrel (9)
- Highest home attendance: 23,661 vs Juventus (15 February 2015, Serie A)
- Lowest home attendance: 4,639 vs Casertana (24 August 2014, Coppa Italia)
- Average home league attendance: 16,260
Home colours	Away colours	Third colours

The 2014–15 season was A.C. Cesena's first season back in Serie A after having been relegated at the end of the 2011–12 season. The team competed in Serie A and the Coppa Italia.

== Players ==
As of 30 May 2015

Note: Flags indicate national team as defined under FIFA eligibility rules; some limited exceptions apply. Players may hold more than one non-FIFA nationality.

No.	Pos.	Nation	Player
1	GK	ITA	Nicola Leali (on loan from Juventus)
2	DF	ROU	Constantin Nica (on loan from Atalanta)
4	MF	ITA	Luca Valzania
5	MF	ITA	Luigi Giorgi (on loan from Atalanta)
6	DF	ITA	Stefano Lucchini
7	MF	COL	Carlos Carbonero (on loan from Estudiantes)
8	MF	ITA	Giuseppe De Feudis
9	FW	ESP	Alejandro Rodríguez
11	FW	ITA	Franco Brienza
14	DF	ITA	Massimo Volta (on loan from Sampdoria)
15	DF	SVN	Luka Krajnc
16	GK	ITA	Alberto Iglio
17	DF	ISL	Hörður Magnússon (on loan from Juventus)
18	FW	BIH	Milan Đurić
19	FW	ITA	Davide Succi

No.	Pos.	Nation	Player
23	MF	ITA	Andrea Tabanelli
24	DF	ITA	Gabriele Perico
25	DF	ITA	Daniele Capelli (on loan from Atalanta)
26	MF	COD	Gaby Mudingayi
27	FW	ITA	Nicola Dalmonte
30	GK	ITA	Federico Agliardi
32	FW	ITA	Gabriele Moncini
33	DF	ITA	Francesco Renzetti
34	MF	ITA	Emmanuel Cascione
44	MF	ITA	Riccardo Cazzola (on loan from Atalanta)
56	MF	ITA	Nico Pulzetti (on loan from Bologna)
77	MF	BRA	Zé Eduardo
81	GK	ITA	Walter Bressan
89	FW	ITA	Guido Marilungo (on loan from Atalanta)
92	FW	FRA	Grégoire Defrel

== Competitions ==
=== Serie A ===
==== League table ====
Pos	Team	Pld	W	D	L	GF	GA	GD	Pts	Qualification or relegation
16	Udinese	38	10	11	17	43	56	−13	41	
17	Atalanta	38	7	16	15	38	57	−19	37	
18	Cagliari (R)	38	8	10	20	48	68	−20	34	Relegation to Serie B
19	Cesena (R)	38	4	12	22	36	73	−37	24	Relegation to Serie B
20	Parma (L, R)	38	6	8	24	33	75	−42	19 (Note: Parma was docked 7 points for failing to pay over players' wages. Later the club announced bankruptcy, and it was recreated without professional status.)	Relegation to Serie D

Source: 2014–15 Serie A, 2014-15 Serie A classification.
Rules for classification: 1) points; 2) head-to-head points; 3) head-to-head goal difference; 4) goal difference; 5) number of goals scored; 6) draw. (Head-to-head record is applied for clubs with the same number of points only once all matches between said clubs have been played.).
(L) Liquidated after the season due to bankruptcy.; (R) Relegated

==== Results summary ====
Overall								Home						Away					
Pld	W	D	L	GF	GA	GD	Pts	W	D	L	GF	GA	GD	W	D	L	GF	GA	GD
38	4	12	22	36	73	−37	24	3	7	9	19	31	−12	1	5	13	17	42	−25

Last updated: 31 May 2015.
Source: Competitive matches

==== Results by round ====
Round	1	2	3	4	5	6	7	8	9	10	11	12	13	14	15	16	17	18	19	20	21	22	23	24	25	26	27	28	29	30	31	32	33	34	35	36	37	38
Ground	H	A	H	A	H	A	A	H	A	H	A	H	H	A	H	A	H	A	H	A	H	A	H	A	H	H	A	H	A	H	A	A	H	A	H	A	H	A
Result	W	L	D	L	D	D	L	L	L	D	L	D	L	L	L	D	L	L	L	W	W	L	D	L	W	D	D	L	D	L	D	L	D	L	L	L	L	L
Position	5	12	11	13	13	17	17	17	18	18	19	19	19	19	19	19	20	20	20	19	19	19	19	19	19	19	19	19	19	19	19	19	19	19	19	19	19	19

Updated to match(es) played on 31 May 2015. Source: Competitive matches
A = Away; H = Home; W = Win; D = Draw; L = Loss

==== Matches ====
31 August 2014 1	Cesena	1–0	Parma	Cesena
20:45 CEST (UTC+02:00)	Lucchini (yellow card) 25'; Rodríguez 38', (yellow card) 87'	Report	Jorquera (yellow card) 57'; Paletta (yellow card) 85'	Stadium: Stadio Dino Manuzzi; Attendance: 14,415; Referee: Sebastiano Peruzzo

14 September 2014 2	Lazio	3–0	Cesena	Rome
15:00 CEST (UTC+02:00)	Candreva 19'; Parolo (yellow card) 28', (goal) 56'; Biglia (yellow card) 44'; Braafheid (yellow card) 68'; Mauri 90'	Report	Lucchini (yellow card) 25'	Stadium: Stadio Olimpico; Attendance: 31,200; Referee: Massimiliano Irrati

20 September 2014 3	Cesena	2–2	Empoli	Cesena
18:00 CEST (UTC+02:00)	Giorgi (yellow card) 24'; Marilungo 30'; Defrel 32', (yellow card) 77'; Cascione (yellow card) 51'; Lucchini (yellow card) 54'	Report	Tavano 55' (pen.); Rugani 72'; Vecino (yellow card) 76'	Stadium: Stadio Dino Manuzzi; Attendance: 14,073; Referee: Claudio Gavillucci

24 September 2014 4	Juventus	3–0	Cesena	Turin
20:45 CEST (UTC+02:00)	Vidal 18' (pen.), 64'; Lichtsteiner 85'	Report	Cascione (yellow card) 17'; Capelli (yellow card) 31'; Perico (yellow card) 51'	Stadium: Juventus Stadium; Attendance: 34,556; Referee: Piero Giacomelli

28 September 2014 5	Cesena	1–1	Milan	Cesena
15:00 CEST (UTC+02:00)	Succi 10'; Coppola (yellow card) 17'; Cascione (yellow card) 22'; Renzetti (yellow card) 57'; De Feudis (yellow card) 90+1'	Report	Rami 19'; Bonaventura (yellow card) 44'; De Jong (yellow card) 69'; Zapata (red card) 73'	Stadium: Stadio Dino Manuzzi; Attendance: 22,027; Referee: Marco Guida

5 October 2014 6	Udinese	1–1	Cesena	Udine
15:00 CEST (UTC+02:00)	Fernandes 62'; Muriel (yellow card) 81'; Widmer (yellow card) 90+1'; Karnezis (yellow card) 90+2'	Report	Lucchini (yellow card) 27'; Coppola (yellow card) 70'; Capelli (yellow card) 78'; Cascione 90+2' (pen.)	Stadium: Stadio Friuli; Attendance: 8,887; Referee: Maurizio Mariani

19 October 2014 7	Palermo	2–1	Cesena	Palermo
15:00 CEST (UTC+02:00)	Dybala 33'; Chochev (yellow card) 35'; Anđelković (yellow card) 60'; Vázquez (yellow card) 65'; Muñoz (yellow card) 81'; Rigoni (yellow card) 88'; González 90+1'	Report	Perico (yellow card) 9'; Rodríguez 61' (pen.); De Feudis (yellow card) 72'; Coppola (yellow card) 76' (yellow-red card) 79'; Capelli (yellow card) 90+5'	Stadium: Stadio Renzo Barbera; Attendance: 14,780; Referee: Antonio Damato

26 October 2014 8	Cesena	0–1	Internazionale	Cesena
18:00 CET (UTC+01:00)	Garritano (yellow card) 13'; Leali (red card) 30'; Giorgi (yellow card) 36'; Volta (yellow card) 61'; Rodríguez (yellow card) 86'; Cascione (yellow card) 90'	Report	Icardi 32' (pen.); Campagnaro (yellow card) 53'	Stadium: Stadio Dino Manuzzi; Attendance: 22,917; Referee: Paolo Mazzoleni

29 October 2014 9	Roma	2–0	Cesena	Rome
20:45 CET (UTC+01:00)	Destro 9', (yellow card) 75'; De Rossi 81'	Report		Stadium: Stadio Olimpico; Attendance: 34,044; Referee: Dino Tommasi

2 November 2014 10	Cesena	1–1	Hellas Verona	Cesena
19:00 CET (UTC+01:00)	Defrel 22', (yellow card) 61'	Report	Ioniță (yellow card) 10'; Hallfreðsson (yellow card) 39'; Tachtsidis (yellow card) 60'; Juanito 77', (yellow card) 87'	Stadium: Stadio Dino Manuzzi; Attendance: 15,375; Referee: Gianpaolo Calvarese

9 November 2014 11	Chievo	2–1	Cesena	Verona
15:00 CET (UTC+01:00)	Meggiorini (yellow card) 12'; Gamberini (yellow card) 30'; Hetemaj (yellow card) 32'; Frey (yellow card) 45+1'; Pellissier 48', 90'	Report	Carbonero (yellow card) 59'; Lucchini (yellow card) 74'; Volta (yellow card) 82'; Đurić 88', (yellow card) 88'	Stadium: Stadio Marc'Antonio Bentegodi; Attendance: 5,000; Referee: Paolo Tagliavento

23 November 2014 12	Cesena	1–1	Sampdoria	Cesena
15:00 CET (UTC+01:00)	Brienza (yellow card) 34'; Capelli (yellow card) 43'; Lucchini 60'	Report	Nica 77' (o.g.)	Stadium: Stadio Dino Manuzzi; Attendance: 16,184; Referee: Andrea Gervasoni

30 November 2014 13	Cesena	0–3	Genoa	Cesena
15:00 CET (UTC+01:00)	Lucchini (yellow card) 29'; Giorgi (yellow card) 33'; Carbonero (yellow card) 51'	Report	Matri 4'; Antonelli 7'; Roncaglia (yellow card) 34'; Volta 43' (o.g.); Burdisso (yellow card) 89'	Stadium: Stadio Dino Manuzzi; Attendance: 14,650; Referee: Carmine Russo

7 December 2014 14	Atalanta	3–2	Cesena	Bergamo
15:00 CET (UTC+01:00)	Carmona (yellow card) 13'; Benalouane 45+1', (yellow card) 83'; Stendardo 50'; Moralez 52'; Sportiello (yellow card) 89'	Report	Defrel 31', 43', (yellow card) 33'; Lucchini (yellow card) 49'; Giorgi (yellow card) 62'; De Feudis (yellow card) 74'; Renzetti (yellow card) 90'	Stadium: Stadio Atleti Azzurri d'Italia; Attendance: 12,495; Referee: Marco Di Bello

14 December 2014 15	Cesena	1–4	Fiorentina	Cesena
18:00 CET (UTC+01:00)	Volta (yellow card) 18' (yellow-red card) 77'; Cascione (yellow card) 57'; Savić 60' (o.g.); Coppola (yellow card) 71'	Report	Valero 44', (yellow card) 49'; Savić 47'; Rodríguez 79'; El Hamdaoui 90+3'	Stadium: Stadio Dino Manuzzi; Attendance: 16,275; Referee: Daniele Orsato

20 December 2014 16	Sassuolo	1–1	Cesena	Reggio Emilia
18:00 CET (UTC+01:00)	Peluso (yellow card) 53'; Berardi (yellow card) 59'; Zaza 76' (pen.); Missiroli (yellow card) 88'; Magnanelli (yellow card) 90+3'	Report	Defrel (yellow card) 10'; Zé Eduardo 90+4'	Stadium: Mapei Stadium – Città del Tricolore; Attendance: 11,079; Referee: Angelo Cervellera

6 January 2015 17	Cesena	1–4	Napoli	Cesena
18:00 CET (UTC+01:00)	Capelli (yellow card) 61'; Brienza 75'; Zé Eduardo (yellow card) 83'	Report	Callejón 29'; Gargano (yellow card) 37'; Higuaín 41', 72'; Henrique (yellow card) 53'; Capelli 64' (o.g.)	Stadium: Stadio Dino Manuzzi; Attendance: 16,275; Referee: Davide Massa

11 January 2015 18	Cagliari	2–1	Cesena	Cagliari
15:00 CET (UTC+01:00)	João Pedro 11'; Rossettini (yellow card) 21'; Donsah 27'	Report	Giorgi (yellow card) 10'; Valzania (yellow card) 19'; Volta (yellow card) 29'; Brienza 89'	Stadium: Stadio Sant'Elia; Attendance: 10,000; Referee: Nicola Rizzoli

18 January 2015 19	Cesena	2–3	Torino	Cesena
15:00 CET (UTC+01:00)	Perico (yellow card) 30'; Brienza 43' (pen.), 85' (pen.); Zé Eduardo (yellow card) 61'; De Feudis (yellow card) 76'; Giorgi (yellow card) 80'; Defrel (yellow card) 90'	Report	Benassi 20', (yellow card) 58'; Quagliarella 22'; Padelli (yellow card) 42'; Peres (yellow card) 83'; Jansson (yellow card) 84'; Moretti (yellow card) 86'; López 87'	Stadium: Stadio Dino Manuzzi; Attendance: 14,910; Referee: Marco Guida

25 January 2015 20	Parma	1–2	Cesena	Parma
15:00 CET (UTC+01:00)	Palladino (yellow card) 45+1'; Mauri (yellow card) 65'; Cascione 76' (o.g.); Varela (yellow card) 79'; Paletta (yellow card) 88'	Report	Pulzetti 21'; Cascione (yellow card) 24'; Renzetti (yellow card) 57'; Leali (yellow card) 60'; Krajnc (yellow card) 80'; Rodríguez 89'	Stadium: Stadio Ennio Tardini; Attendance: 11,791; Referee: Paolo Tagliavento

1 February 2015 21	Cesena	2–1	Lazio	Cesena
15:00 CET (UTC+01:00)	Defrel 60'; Cataldi 77' (o.g.); Capelli (yellow card) 87'	Report	Parolo (yellow card) 48'; Maurício (yellow card) 57'; Marchetti (yellow card) 78'; Klose 87'	Stadium: Stadio Dino Manuzzi; Attendance: 14,818; Referee: Sebastiano Peruzzo

8 February 2015 22	Empoli	2–0	Cesena	Empoli
15:00 CET (UTC+01:00)	Maccarone 29'; Mário Rui (yellow card) 45+1'; Signorelli 57'; Mchedlidze (yellow card) 83'	Report	De Feudis (yellow card) 11'; Capelli (yellow card) 36'; Giorgi (yellow card) 63'; Rodríguez (yellow card) 82'	Stadium: Stadio Carlo Castellani; Attendance: 7,586; Referee: Daniele Orsato

15 February 2015 23	Cesena	2–2	Juventus	Cesena
20:45 CET (UTC+01:00)	Đurić 17'; Perico (yellow card) 20'; Brienza 70'; Nica (yellow card) 88'	Report	Morata 27'; Marchisio 33'; Lichtsteiner (yellow card) 41'; Bonucci (yellow card) 69'	Stadium: Stadio Dino Manuzzi; Attendance: 23,661; Referee: Carmine Russo

22 February 2015 24	Milan	2–0	Cesena	Milan
15:00 CET (UTC+01:00)	Bonaventura 22'; Bocchetti (yellow card) 31'; Pazzini 90' (pen.)	Report	Lucchini (yellow card) 8'; Nica (yellow card) 62'; Volta (yellow card) 88'; Giorgi (yellow card) 89'; Mudingayi (yellow card) 90+2'; Carbonero (yellow card) 90+2'	Stadium: San Siro; Attendance: 27,958; Referee: Dino Tommasi

1 March 2015 25	Cesena	1–0	Udinese	Cesena
15:00 CET (UTC+01:00)	Mudingayi (yellow card) 18'; Capelli (yellow card) 26'; Magnússon (yellow card) 29'; Rodríguez 76'; Perico (yellow card) 90+1'	Report	Heurtaux (yellow card) 24'; Danilo (yellow card) 89'; Perica (yellow card) 90+4'	Stadium: Stadio Dino Manuzzi; Attendance: 14,794; Referee: Daniele Doveri

8 March 2015 26	Cesena	0–0	Palermo	Cesena
12:30 CET (UTC+01:00)	Giorgi (yellow card) 15'	Report	Jajalo (yellow card) 10'; Barreto (yellow card) 18'	Stadium: Stadio Dino Manuzzi; Attendance: 15,071; Referee: Luca Banti

15 March 2015 27	Internazionale	1–1	Cesena	Milan
20:45 CET (UTC+01:00)	Ranocchia (yellow card) 45+1'; Palacio 48'	Report	Defrel (yellow card) 26', (goal) 30'	Stadium: San Siro; Attendance: 24,589; Referee: Andrea Gervasoni

22 March 2015 28	Cesena	0–1	Roma	Cesena
20:45 CET (UTC+01:00)	Capelli (yellow card) 38'; Lucchini (yellow card) 49'; Mudingayi (yellow card) 89'	Report	Uçan (yellow card) 33'; De Rossi 41', (yellow card) 88'	Stadium: Stadio Dino Manuzzi; Attendance: 16,575; Referee: Antonio Damato

4 April 2015 29	Hellas Verona	3–3	Cesena	Verona
15:00 CEST (UTC+02:00)	Toni 3', 62'; Janković (yellow card) 20'; Hallfreðsson (yellow card) 26'; Juanito 30'; Rodríguez (yellow card) 76'	Report	Pulzetti (yellow card) 32'; Kranjc (yellow card) 50'; Carbonero 70'; Brienza 77'; Succi (yellow card) 80', (goal) 81'	Stadium: Stadio Marc'Antonio Bentegodi; Attendance: 17,590; Referee: Daniele Orsato

12 April 2015 30	Cesena	0–1	Chievo	Cesena
12:30 CET (UTC+02:00)	Carbonero (yellow card) 61'; Đurić (yellow card) 63'	Report	Hetemaj (yellow card) 55'; Pellissier 82'	Stadium: Stadio Dino Manuzzi; Attendance: 15,094; Referee: Paolo Valeri

18 April 2015 31	Sampdoria	0–0	Cesena	Genoa
18:00 CEST (UTC+02:00)	Silvestre (yellow card) 59'; Okaka (yellow card) 71'	Report	Perico (yellow card) 30'; Mudingayi (yellow card) 74'; Krajnc (yellow card) 77'	Stadium: Stadio Luigi Ferraris; Attendance: 21,182; Referee: Piero Giacomelli

26 April 2015 32	Genoa	3–1	Cesena	Genoa
15:00 CEST (UTC+02:00)	Bertolacci (yellow card) 10', (goal) 38'; Perotti 45+3' (pen.); Pavoletti 53', (yellow card) 74'	Report	Volta (yellow card) 11'; Carbonero 69', (yellow card) 86'; Cascione (yellow card) 78'; Zé Eduardo (red card) 90+2'	Stadium: Stadio Luigi Ferraris; Attendance: 19,663; Referee: Sebastiano Peruzzo

29 April 2015 33	Cesena	2–2	Atalanta	Cesena
20:45 CEST (UTC+02:00)	Mudingayi (yellow card) 36'; Carbonero (yellow card) 45', (goal) 70'; Brienza 56' (pen.); Perico (yellow card) 64'	Report	Pinilla 50', 82', (yellow card) 90+5'; Benalouane (yellow card) 55'; Migliaccio (yellow card) 86'; Carmona (yellow card) 88'	Stadium: Stadio Dino Manuzzi; Attendance: 14,170; Referee: Nicola Rizzoli

3 May 2015 34	Fiorentina	3–1	Cesena	Florence
15:00 CEST (UTC+02:00)	Iličić 31' (pen.), 35', (yellow card) 67'; Gilardino 56'	Report	Rodríguez 59'; Capelli (yellow card) 69'	Stadium: Stadio Artemio Franchi; Attendance: 28,675; Referee: Daniele Doveri

10 May 2015 35	Cesena	2–3	Sassuolo	Cesena
15:00 CEST (UTC+02:00)	Defrel 15'; Brienza 29', (yellow card) 62'; Carbonero (yellow card) 90+3'	Report	Zaza 48'; Taïder 51'; Missiroli 69'	Stadium: Stadio Dino Manuzzi; Attendance: 13,712; Referee: Luca Banti

18 May 2015 36	Napoli	3–2	Cesena	Naples
21:00 CEST (UTC+02:00)	Mertens 19', 57'; Gabbiadini 21'; Ghoulam (yellow card) 42'; Koulibaly (yellow card) 76'	Report	Volta (yellow card) 6'; Defrel 15', 45+2'; Capelli (yellow card) 71'	Stadium: Stadio San Paolo; Attendance: 37,568; Referee: Massimiliano Irrati

24 May 2015 37	Cesena	0–1	Cagliari	Cesena
15:00 CEST (UTC+02:00)	De Feudis (yellow card) 15'; Lucchini (yellow card) 39'; Cascione (yellow card) 67'	Report	Sau 90+1'	Stadium: Stadio Dino Manuzzi; Attendance: 13,945; Referee: Eugenio Abbattista

31 May 2015 38	Torino	5–0	Cesena	Turin
20:45 CEST (UTC+02:00)	Martínez 10'; López 16', 70'; Benassi 31'; Moretti 49'	Report	Defrel (yellow card) 55'; Volta (yellow card) 61'	Stadium: Stadio Olimpico di Torino; Attendance: 18,569; Referee: Aleandro Di Paolo

=== Coppa Italia ===
24 August 2014 Third round	Cesena	1–0	Casertana	Cesena
20:45 CEST (UTC+02:00)	Marilungo 34'			Stadium: Stadio Dino Manuzzi; Attendance: 4,639; Referee: Eugenio Abbattista

3 December 2014 Fourth round	Udinese	4–2 (a.e.t.)	Cesena	Udine
21:00 CET (UTC+01:00)	Allan 20', (yellow card) 82'; Fernandes 44', (yellow card) 88'; Danilo (yellow card) 55'; Evangelista 99'; Théréau 113'		Đurić 4', (yellow card) 94'; Succi 55'; Volta (red card) 61'; Krajnc (yellow card) 90'; Capelli (yellow card) 103'; Cazzola (yellow card) 105+1'	Stadium: Stadio Friuli; Attendance: 2,400; Referee: Dino Tommasi

== Statistics ==
=== Appearances and goals ===
No.	Pos	Nat	Player	Total		Serie A		Coppa Italia	
No.	Pos	Nat	Player	Apps	Goals	Apps	Goals	Apps	Goals
Goalkeepers
1	GK	(Italy) ITA	Nicola Leali	29	0	28	0	1	0
16	GK	(Italy) ITA	Alberto Iglio	0	0	0	0	0	0
30	GK	(Italy) ITA	Federico Agliardi	11	0	9+1	0	1	0
81	GK	(Italy) ITA	Walter Bressan	0	0	0	0	0	0
Defenders
2	DF	(Romania) ROU	Constantin Nica	8	0	4+4	0	0	0
6	DF	(Italy) ITA	Stefano Lucchini	30	1	26+2	1	1+1	0
14	DF	(Italy) ITA	Massimo Volta	25	0	19+5	0	1	0
15	DF	(Slovenia) SVN	Luka Krajnc	23	0	20+2	0	1	0
17	DF	(Iceland) ISL	Hörður Magnússon	12	0	12	0	0	0
24	DF	(Italy) ITA	Gabriele Perico	22	0	18+3	0	1	0
25	DF	(Italy) ITA	Daniele Capelli	32	0	29+1	0	2	0
33	DF	(Italy) ITA	Francesco Renzetti	24	0	21+2	0	1	0
Midfielders
4	MF	(Italy) ITA	Luca Valzania	3	0	2	0	1	0
5	MF	(Italy) ITA	Luigi Giorgi	27	0	24+3	0	0	0
7	MF	(Colombia) COL	Carlos Carbonero	22	3	15+7	3	0	0
8	MF	(Italy) ITA	Giuseppe De Feudis	27	0	23+2	0	1+1	0
23	MF	(Italy) ITA	Andrea Tabanelli	9	0	3+4	0	0+2	0
26	MF	(Democratic Republic of the Congo) COD	Gaby Mudingayi	10	0	8+1	0	1	0
34	MF	(Italy) ITA	Emmanuel Cascione	29	1	24+5	1	0	0
44	MF	(Italy) ITA	Riccardo Cazzola	6	0	0+5	0	0+1	0
56	MF	(Italy) ITA	Nico Pulzetti	9	1	4+5	1	0	0
77	MF	(Brazil) BRA	Zé Eduardo	14	1	7+6	1	0+1	0
Forwards
9	FW	(Spain) ESP	Alejandro Rodríguez	25	5	6+19	5	0	0
11	FW	(Italy) ITA	Franco Brienza	31	8	29+1	8	1	0
18	FW	(Bosnia and Herzegovina) BIH	Milan Đurić	30	3	17+11	2	1+1	1
19	FW	(Italy) ITA	Davide Succi	10	3	4+5	2	1	1
27	FW	(Italy) ITA	Nicola Dalmonte	4	0	1+3	0	0	0
32	FW	(Italy) ITA	Gabriele Moncini	2	0	0+2	0	0	0
89	FW	(Italy) ITA	Guido Marilungo	9	2	8	1	1	1
92	FW	(France) FRA	Grégoire Defrel	36	9	31+3	9	1+1	0
Players transferred out during the season
3	DF	(Italy) ITA	Antonio Mazzotta	10	0	7+3	0	0	0
10	MF	(Italy) ITA	Manuel Coppola	13	0	10+1	0	2	0
27	FW	(Portugal) POR	Hugo Almeida	10	0	7+3	0	0	0
61	FW	(Italy) ITA	Luca Garritano	6	0	1+5	0	0	0

Last updated: 30 May 2015
Source: BDFutbol
