= Salvatore Molina =

Italian footballer (born 1992)

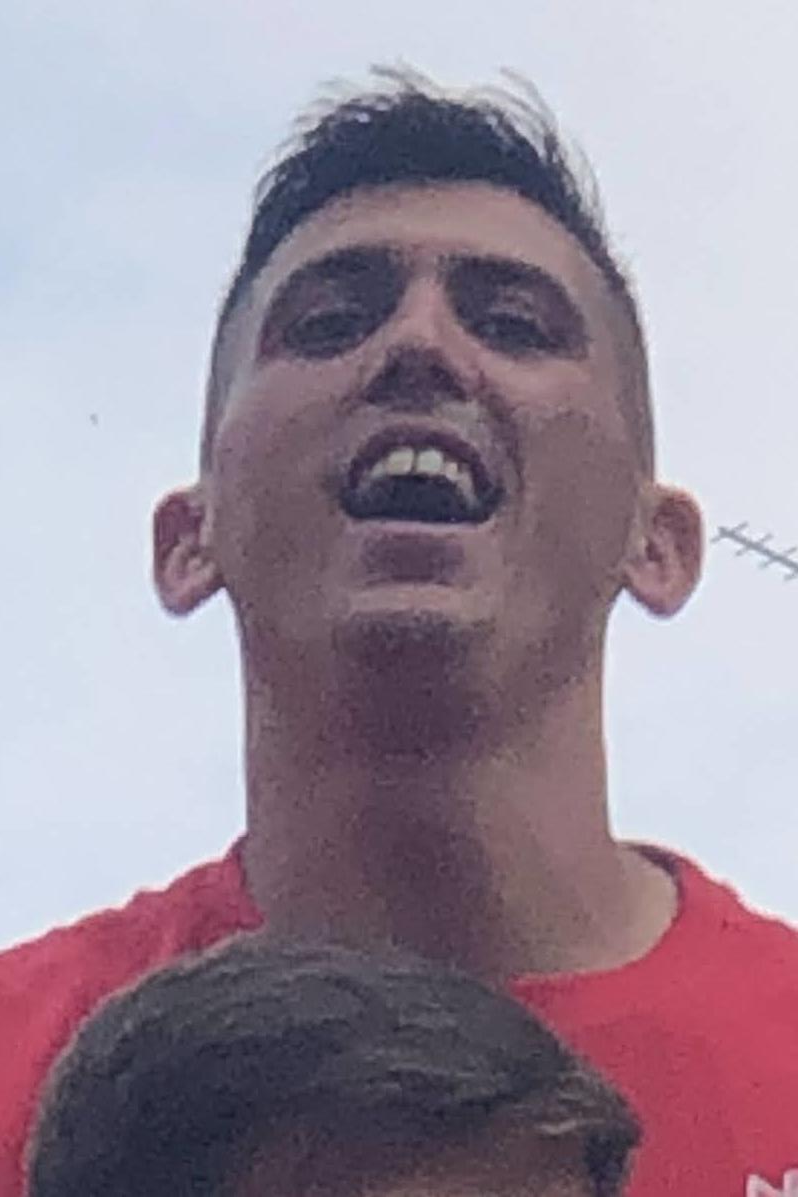
- Molina with Monza in 2022

Personal information
- Full name: Salvatore Andrea Molina
- Date of birth: 1 January 1992 (age 34)
- Place of birth: Garbagnate Milanese, Italy
- Height: 1.77 m (5 ft 10 in)
- Positions: Midfielder; winger

Team information
- Current team: Südtirol
- Number: 79

Youth career
- 2001–2011: Atalanta

Senior career*
Years	Team	Apps	(Gls)
2011–2018	Atalanta	4	(0)
2011–2012	→ Foggia (loan)	20	(1)
2012–2013	→ Barletta (loan)	29	(2)
2013–2014	→ Modena (loan)	36	(4)
2015	→ Carpi (loan)	11	(0)
2015–2016	→ Cesena (loan)	16	(0)
2016	→ Perugia (loan)	12	(0)
2016–2018	→ Avellino (loan)	39	(3)
2018–2022	Crotone	111	(4)
2022–2023	Monza	22	(0)
2023	Bari	13	(0)
2024–	Südtirol	86	(5)

International career
2010–2012	Italy U20	4	(0)
2013–2015	Italy U21	9	(0)
- * Club domestic league appearances and goals as of 12 May 2026

Salvatore Andrea Molina (born 1 January 1992) is an Italian professional footballer who plays as a midfielder or winger for Serie B club Südtirol.

== Club career ==
=== Atalanta ===
Born in Garbagnate Milanese, Molina joined Atalanta's youth system in 2001, aged nine.

==== Loan to Foggia ====
On 10 July 2011, he was loaned to U.S. Foggia, alongside Alessandro De Leidi.

Molina played his first match as a professional on 7 August 2011, starting in a Coppa Italia 3–0 home win against Trapani. He made his league debut on 4 September, starting in a 1–2 home loss against Benevento, and scored his first goal on 11 December, netting the first of a 3–1 home success over Ternana.

==== Loan to Barletta ====
On 29 August 2012, Molina joined Barletta in a season-long loan deal. He was an ever-present figure for the club, scoring two goals in 31 appearances.

==== Loan to Modena ====
On 17 July 2013, Molina and team-mate Doudou Mangni moved to Modena on loan. He made his Serie B debut on 24 August, playing the full 90 minutes in a 1–1 home draw against Palermo.

Molina scored his first goal in the division on 29 December in a 1–1 draw at Cesena. He later netted a brace in a 4–0 home defeat of Bari on 16 February of the following year, and finished the campaign with 39 matches and four goals, with his side being knocked out in the play-offs.

==== Return to Atalanta ====
On 20 June 2014, Molina returned to Atalanta, and made his Serie A debut on 21 September, replacing Boukary Dramé in the 82nd minute of a 0–1 home loss against Fiorentina.

==== Loan to Cesena ====
On 10 July 2015, Molina was signed by A.C. Cesena in a temporary deal, with an option to purchase.

==== Loan to Perugia ====
On 1 February 2016, Molina was transferred to Perugia in another temporary deal.

==== Loan to Avellino ====
On 31 August 2016, Molina was signed by Avellino in a temporary deal.

=== Crotone ===
On 8 August 2018, Molina signed with Serie B club Crotone. Crotone were promoted to Serie A for the 2020–21 season.

=== Monza ===
On 5 January 2022, Molina signed for Monza in Serie B on a one-and-a-half-year deal. Once again, Molina helped his club receive promotion to Serie A at the end of the 2021–22 season.

=== Bari ===
On 31 January 2023, Molina signed with Bari in Serie B until the end of the 2022–23 season.

=== Südtirol ===
On 3 January 2024, Molina joined Südtirol until the end of the 2023–24 season, with an option to extend for one more season.

== International career ==
Molina represented Italy at the under-20 level in four friendlies: against Switzerland twice and Poland in the Under-20 Four Nations Tournament, as well as against Ghana.

== Career statistics ==
As of match played 19 October 2022

Appearances and goals by club, season and competition
Club	Season	League			Coppa Italia		Other		Total	
Club	Season	Division	Apps	Goals	Apps	Goals	Apps	Goals	Apps	Goals
Atalanta	2011–12	Serie A	—		—		—		0	0
Atalanta	2012–13	Serie A	—		—		—		0	0
Atalanta	2013–14	Serie A	—		—		—		0	0
Atalanta	2014–15	Serie A	4	0	1	0	—		5	0
Atalanta	2015–16	Serie A	—		—		—		0	0
Atalanta	2016–17	Serie A	0	0	0	0	—		0	0
Atalanta	2017–18	Serie A	—		—		—		0	0
Atalanta	Total		4	0	1	0	0	0	5	0
Foggia (loan)	2011–12	Lega Pro Prima Divisione	20	1	2	0	—		22	1
Barletta (loan)	2012–13	Lega Pro Prima Divisione	29	2	0	0	2 (Note: Appearances in Lega Pro relegation playout)	0	31	2
Modena (loan)	2013–14	Serie B	36	4	1	0	3 (Note: Appearances in Serie B promotion playoff)	0	40	4
Carpi (loan)	2014–15	Serie B	11	0	0	0	—		11	0
Cesena (loan)	2015–16	Serie B	16	0	3	1	—		19	1
Perugia (loan)	2015–16	Serie B	12	0	0	0	—		12	0
Avellino (loan)	2016–17	Serie B	0	0	0	0	—		0	0
Avellino (loan)	2017–18	Serie B	39	3	2	0	—		41	3
Avellino (loan)	Total		39	3	2	0	0	0	41	3
Crotone	2018–19	Serie B	29	1	1	0	—		30	1
Crotone	2019–20	Serie B	36	2	2	1	—		38	3
Crotone	2020–21	Serie A	29	1	1	0	—		30	1
Crotone	2021–22	Serie B	17	0	1	0	—		18	0
Crotone	Total		111	4	5	1	0	0	116	5
Monza	2021–22	Serie B	17	0	0	0	4	0	21	0
Monza	2022–23	Serie A	5	0	1	1	—		6	1
Monza	Total		22	0	1	1	4	0	27	1
Career total			300	14	15	3	9	0	324	17
