= Renzetti =

Renzetti is an Italian surname. Notable people with the surname include:

- Francesco Renzetti (born 1988), Italian footballer
- Joe Renzetti, American film composer
- Rob Renzetti (born 1967), American animator
- Nick Renzetti III (born 2001), American musician

== See also ==
- 6291 Renzetti, a main-belt asteroid
