= Demiro Pozzebon =

Italian footballer (born 1988)

Personal information
- Date of birth: 31 August 1988 (age 38)
- Place of birth: Rome, Italy
- Height: 1.86 m (6 ft 1 in)
- Position: Forward

Team information
- Current team: Manfredonia

Senior career*
Years	Team	Apps	(Gls)
2009–2010	Luco Canistro	29	(6)
2010	Montevarchi Aquila	5	(0)
2010–2011	Monteriggioni	20	(5)
2011	Arezzo	10	(0)
2011–2012	Sansovino	9	(0)
2012–2014	Olbia	51	(39)
2014–2015	Avellino	6	(1)
2015	→ L'Aquila (loan)	12	(3)
2015–2016	Lucchese	28	(10)
2016–2017	Messina	22	(8)
2017–2018	Catania	15	(2)
2017–2018	→ Triestina (loan)	24	(2)
2018–2019	Bari	24	(3)
2019–2020	Gozzano	15	(2)
2020	→ Avellino (loan)	6	(0)
2020–2021	Bitonto	5	(1)
2021	Acireale	18	(5)
2021–2022	Molfetta	35	(9)
2022	Paganese	11	(2)
2022–2023	Modica	4	(3)
2023–	Manfredonia	4	(0)
- * Club domestic league appearances and goals as of 1 October 2023

|real normanna| 2024-2025

| albanova calcio| 2025-

Demiro Pozzebon (born 31 August 1988) is an Italian football player who plays for albanova.

== Club career ==
He made his Serie B debut for Avellino on 23 September 2014 in a game against Frosinone.

On 16 July 2019, he joined Gozzano. On 31 January 2020, he returned to Avellino on loan.
