= Davide Merelli =

Italian footballer (born 1996)

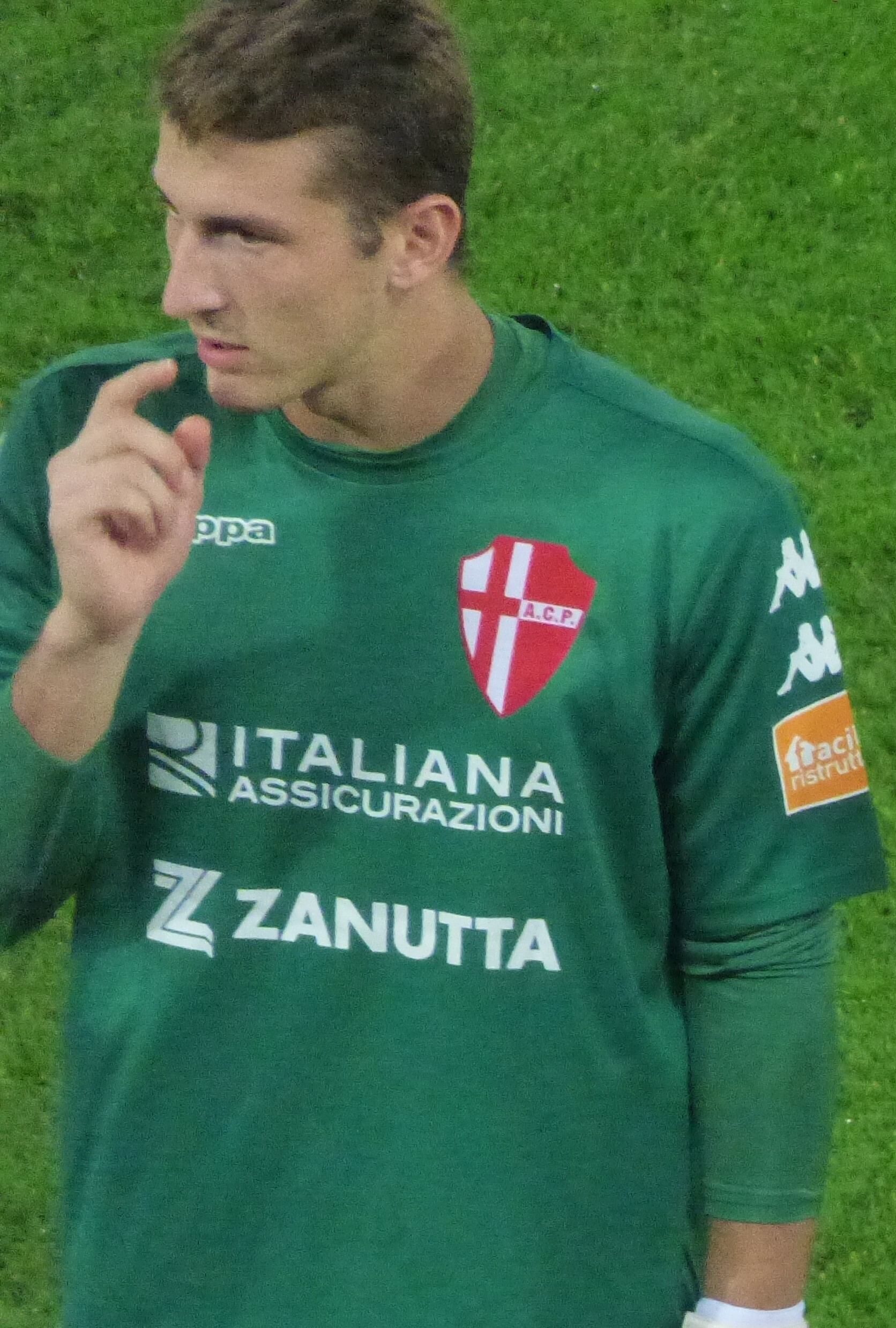
- Merelli in 2018

Personal information
- Date of birth: 3 March 1996 (age 30)
- Place of birth: Manerbio, Italy
- Height: 1.88 m (6 ft 2 in)
- Position: Goalkeeper

Team information
- Current team: Crotone
- Number: 1

Youth career
- –2015: Atalanta

Senior career*
| Years | Team | Apps | (Gls) |
| 2015–2018 | Atalanta | 0 | (0) |
| 2015–2016 | → Forlì (loan) | 36 | (0) |
| 2016–2017 | → Renate (loan) | 1 | (0) |
| 2017–2018 | → Padova (loan) | 3 | (0) |
| 2018–2021 | Padova | 16 | (0) |
| 2020 | → Rieti (loan) | 8 | (0) |
| 2021–2022 | Caratese | 25 | (0) |
| 2022–2023 | Termoli | 12 | (0) |
| 2023 | USD Casatese | 13 | (0) |
| 2023–2025 | Picerno | 33 | (0) |
| 2025– | Crotone | 38 | (0) |
- * Club domestic league appearances and goals as of 27 April 2026

Davide Merelli (born 3 March 1996) is an Italian professional footballer who plays as a goalkeeper for Serie C Group C club Crotone.

== Club career ==
Merelli made his Serie C debut for Renate on 25 September 2016 in a game against Viterbese.

On 13 July 2018, he signed a three-year contract with Padova, after playing for them on loan from Atalanta in the previous season.
