= Massimo Volta =

Italian footballer

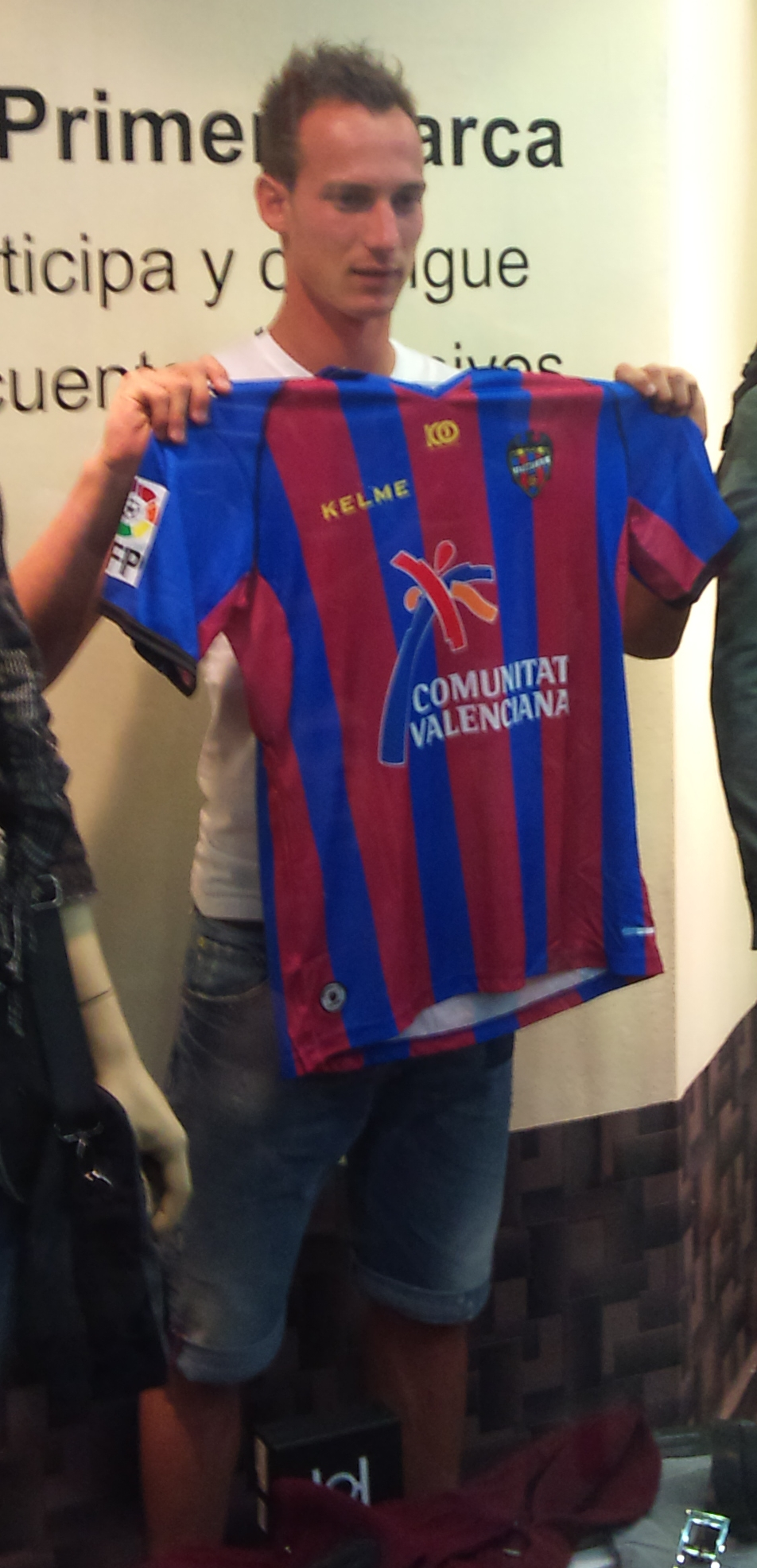
- Volta being presented at Levante UD

Personal information
- Date of birth: 14 May 1987 (age 39)
- Place of birth: Desenzano, Italy
- Height: 1.87 m (6 ft 2 in)
- Position: Centre back

Youth career
- 2005–2006: Carpenedolo

Senior career*
Years	Team	Apps	(Gls)
2006–2007	Carpenedolo	25	(2)
2007–2015	Sampdoria	47	(3)
2007–2008	→ Foligno (loan)	25	(0)
2008–2009	→ Vicenza (loan)	29	(3)
2009–2010	→ Cesena (loan)	38	(1)
2012–2013	→ Levante (loan)	0	(0)
2013–2015	→ Cesena (loan)	77	(2)
2015–2019	Perugia	108	(4)
2018–2019	→ Benevento (loan)	32	(2)
2019–2021	Benevento	15	(0)
2021	→ Pescara (loan)	5	(0)
2021–2022	Triestina	27	(0)
2022–2026	Carpenedolo	33	(1)
- * Club domestic league appearances and goals

Massimo Volta (born 14 May 1987) is a retired Italian professional footballer who played as a defender.

== Club career ==
Volta started his career with minor league club Carpenedolo.

=== Sampdoria ===
In January 2007 Volta was signed by Sampdoria in co-ownership deal for €200,000 in 4 1/2-year contract. Volta spent rest of 2006–07 Serie C2 season with Carpenedolo.

=== Parma ===
During 2007–08 season Parma bought Carpenedolo's stake for €200,000. Volta spent his 2007–08 season with the third division club Foligno. In June 2008 Parma and Sampdoria renewed the co-ownership deal. Volta moved up one level again and played for Vicenza in 2008–09 Serie B. Volta also spent 2008 pre-season with the Genoese team, wearing no. 87, but left on loan on the last day of transfer window. In summer 2009 Volta signed a new five-year deal with Sampdoria, the co-ownership deal also renewed again in June 2009. In August 2009 Volta left for Serie B newcomers Cesena, where he was one of the main protagonists of the club's rise into the top flight.

=== Return to Sampdoria ===
In June 2010 Sampdoria and Parma agreed to renew the co-ownership agreement again, with Volta joining the Blucerchiati for the new season. In summer 2010 he signed a new five-year contract again with Samp. He made his debut with Sampdoria in the Third Qualifying Round of the 2010–11 UEFA Champions League against Werder Bremen. That season he rotated with Stefano Lucchini as the centre-back, which Volta played 6 out of 6 group stage matches of 2010–11 UEFA Europa League, and Lucchini mainly for domestic league. The other centre-back was Daniele Gastaldello.

After Sampdoria relegated, Sampdoria bought Volta outright from Parma for €900,000 in June 2011, (Note: €700,000 excess the accounting value of the retained half in Parma FC accounts (€200,000), thus Parma booked a financial income of €700,000. (Source: Parma FC Report and Accounts on 30 June 2011 (in Italian), CCIAA) and Lucchini was released.

Volta was a regular starter for Doria in 2011–12 Serie B. The team promoted back to Serie A just 1 season. On 31 August 2012, Volta left for Spanish club Levante UD.

=== Cesena (loan) ===
On 21 January 2013, Volta was signed by Serie B club Cesena. The loan was extended on 11 July 2013. He renewed his loan deal with Cesena again on 18 July 2014, prior to the 2014–15 Serie A.

=== Perugia ===
On 7 July 2015, Volta was sold to A.C. Perugia Calcio.

=== Benevento ===
On 24 July 2018, Volta signed to Benevento a loan with an obligation to buy.

=== Triestina ===
On 21 July 2021, he joined Serie C club Triestina.

=== Later years ===
On 5 October 2022, Volta agreed to return to boyhood club Carpenedolo, playing in the Eccellenza regional division of Lombardy.
