= Grégoire Defrel =

French footballer (born 1991)

Personal information
- Full name: Grégoire André Defrel
- Date of birth: 17 June 1991 (age 35)
- Place of birth: Meudon, France
- Height: 1.80 m (5 ft 11 in)
- Position: Forward

Youth career
- SCM Châtillon
- 2009–2011: Parma

Senior career*
Years	Team	Apps	(Gls)
2011–2012	Parma	1	(0)
2011–2012	→ Foggia (loan)	23	(4)
2012–2015	Cesena	102	(15)
2015–2018	Sassuolo	62	(19)
2017–2018	→ Roma (loan)	15	(1)
2018–2020	Roma	0	(0)
2018–2019	→ Sampdoria (loan)	36	(11)
2019–2020	→ Sassuolo (loan)	17	(3)
2020–2024	Sassuolo	113	(8)
2024–2026	Modena	51	(5)
- * Club domestic league appearances and goals as of 10 May 2026

Grégoire André Defrel (born 17 June 1991) is a French professional footballer who plays as a forward.

== Club career ==
=== Parma ===
Defrel joined Parma in 2009, and made his debut for the club as a substitute at the age of 19 on 22 May 2011, in the final game of the 2010–11 Serie A season in a dead rubber against Cagliari, a match that ended 1–1.

=== Cesena ===
In June 2012, Cesena and Parma made a series of cashless player swaps, in which Defrel (€1.2 million) and Gianluca Lapadula (€1.4 million) went to Cesena, whilst Andrea Rossini (€1.6 million) and Nicola Del Pivo (€1.0 million) went to Parma. Both clubs retained 50% registration rights. In June 2013 and June 2014, Defrel's co-ownership was renewed. Despite Parma going bankrupted and failing to find a new buyer on 25 June 2015, Cesena submitted a bid of reported €51,000 to Lega Serie A to solve the co-ownership in favour of Cesena, despite the club not being required to do so.

=== Sassuolo ===
On 5 August 2015, Sassuolo announced that they had signed Defrel from Cesena for an undisclosed fee. He was given the number 92 shirt.

=== Roma ===
On 20 July 2017, Defrel re-joined former manager Eusebio Di Francesco at Roma on loan, for €5 million loan fee, with an obligation to make the transfer permanent for an additional €15 million (plus €3 million bonuses) should certain sporting targets be met. At the same time, Sassuolo signed Roma youth products Davide Frattesi and Riccardo Marchizza as part of the deal, for a total fee of €8 million.

==== Sampdoria (loan) ====
On 27 July 2018, Defrel joined Sampdoria on a season-long loan with the option to buy from Roma.

==== Sassuolo return (loan) ====
On 30 August 2019, Defrel returned to Sassuolo on a season-long loan deal.

=== Modena ===
On 7 August 2024, Defrel joined Serie B club Modena on a two-year contract.

== International career ==
In May 2019, Defrel was named to Martinique's provisional squad for the 2019 CONCACAF Gold Cup. However, he was dropped from the final roster.

== Style of play ==
A fine dribbler, Defrel has been compared to compatriot Jérémy Ménez.

== Career statistics ==
=== Club ===
As of match played 1 April 2024

Appearances and goals by club, season and competition
Club	Season	League			Coppa Italia		Europe		Other		Total	
Club	Season	Division	Apps	Goals	Apps	Goals	Apps	Goals	Apps	Goals	Apps	Goals
Parma	2010–11	Serie A	1	0	0	0	0	0	–		1	0
Foggia	2011–12	Lega Pro	23	4	1	0	–		–		24	4
Cesena	2012–13	Serie B	30	3	0	0	–		–		30	3
Cesena	2013–14	Serie B	38	3	2	0	–		4 (Note: Appearances in Serie B promotion play-offs)	1	44	4
Cesena	2014–15	Serie A	34	9	2	0	–		–		36	9
Cesena	Total		102	15	4	0	–		4	1	110	16
Sassuolo	2015–16	Serie A	33	7	2	0	–		–		35	7
Sassuolo	2016–17	Serie A	29	12	1	0	8 (Note: Appearances in UEFA Europa League)	4	–		38	16
Sassuolo	Total		62	19	3	0	8	4	–		73	23
Roma	2017–18	Serie A	15	1	0	0	5 (Note: Appearances in UEFA Champions League)	0	–		20	1
Sampdoria (loan)	2018–19	Serie A	36	11	3	1	–		–		39	12
Sassuolo (loan)	2019–20	Serie A	17	3	0	0	–		–		17	3
Sassuolo	2020–21	Serie A	28	3	0	0	–		–		28	3
Sassuolo	2021–22	Serie A	38	2	2	0	–		–		40	2
Sassuolo	2022–23	Serie A	27	2	1	0	–		–		28	2
Sassuolo	2023–24	Serie A	16	1	2	0	–		–		18	1
Sassuolo	Total		109	8	5	0	–		–		114	8
Career total			365	61	16	1	13	4	4	1	398	67
