= Nicolas Napol =

French footballer (born 1996)

Personal information
- Date of birth: 3 April 1996 (age 30)
- Place of birth: France
- Height: 1.86 m (6 ft 1 in)
- Position: Forward

Youth career
- -2014: Paris FC
- ACBB
- Lorient
- Atalanta

Senior career*
Years	Team	Apps	(Gls)
	Lorient B	0	(0)
	Atalanta	0	(0)
2015	→ Avellino (loan)	2	(0)
2017	UJA Maccabi Paris	5	(0)
2017-2018	Croix	20	(0)
- * Club domestic league appearances and goals

Nicolas Napol (born 3 April 1996) is a French former footballer who is last known to have played as an attacker for Croix.

== Career ==
In 2014, Napol signed for Atalanta in the Italian Serie A from the reserves of French Ligue 1 side Lorient, despite initially feeling apprehensive.

In 2015, he was sent on loan to Avellino in the Italian second division.

Before the second half of 2016/17, he signed for French fifth division club UJA Maccabi Paris.

In 2017, Napol signed for Croix in the French fourth division.
