= Nicola Dalmonte =

Italian footballer

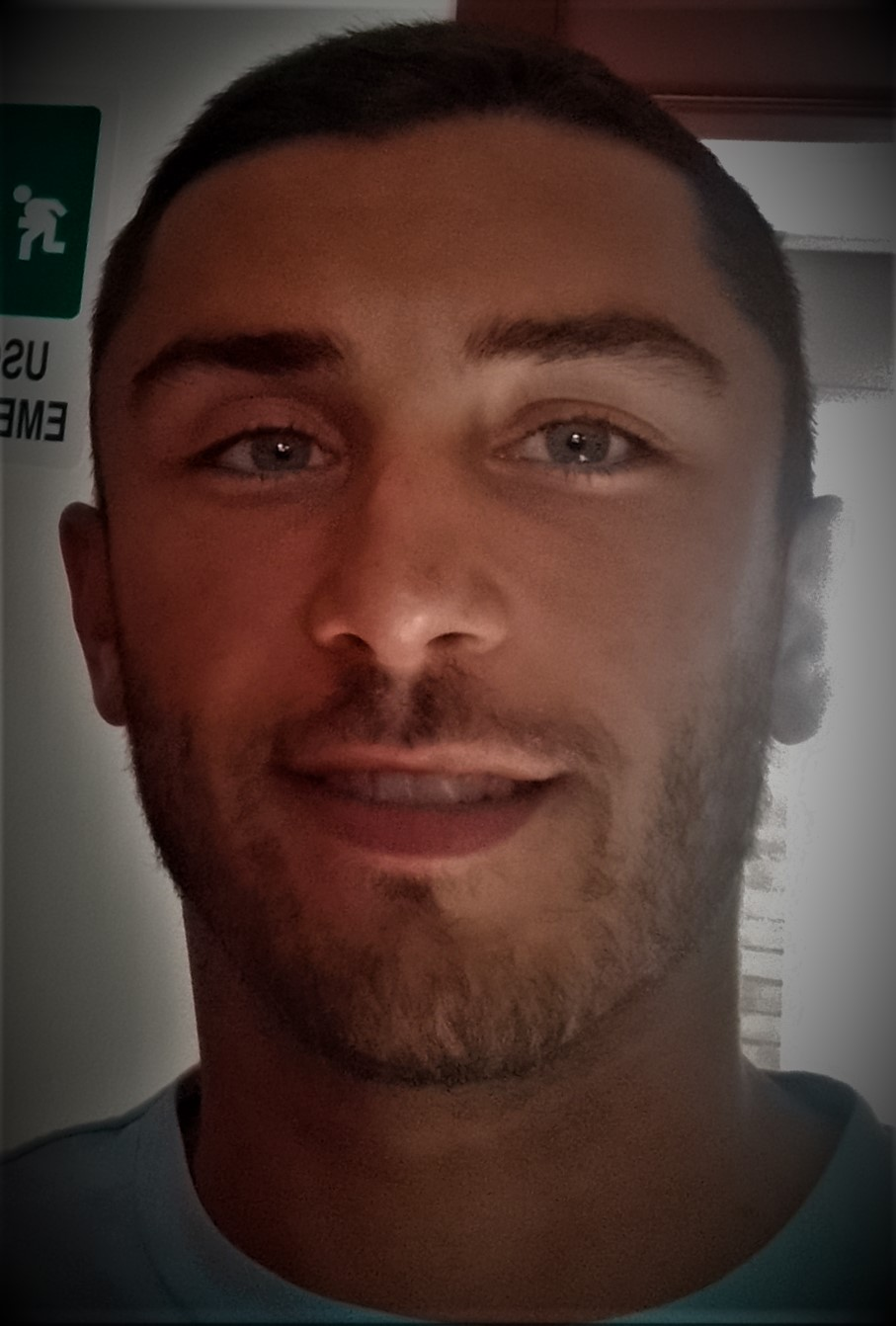

Personal information
- Date of birth: 13 September 1997 (age 29)
- Place of birth: Ravenna, Italy
- Height: 1.69 m (5 ft 7 in)
- Position: Forward

Team information
- Current team: Trento
- Number: 7

Youth career
- –2015: Cesena

Senior career*
Years	Team	Apps	(Gls)
2015–2018	Cesena	46	(5)
2018–2021	Genoa	3	(0)
2019–2020	→ Lugano (loan)	10	(1)
2020	→ Trapani (loan)	17	(3)
2020–2021	→ Vicenza (loan)	19	(4)
2021–2024	Vicenza	67	(10)
2023–2024	→ SPAL (loan)	23	(5)
2024–2025	Salernitana	4	(0)
2025	→ Catania (loan)	5	(0)
2025–	Trento	29	(8)

International career
2014	Italy U17	2	(2)
2014–2015	Italy U18	7	(1)
2015–2016	Italy U19	6	(0)
2017–2018	Italy U20	5	(0)
- * Club domestic league appearances and goals as of 29 April 2026

Nicola Dalmonte (born 13 September 1997) is an Italian professional footballer who plays as a striker for Serie C Group A club Trento.

== Club career ==
Dalmonte is a youth exponent from Cesena. He made his Serie A debut on 26 April 2015 against Genoa. He replaced Franco Brienza after 59 minutes in a 3–1 away defeat.

On 31 July 2018, Dalmonte signed with Serie A club Genoa. On 17 July 2019, Dalmonte signed to FC Lugano on loan until 30 June 2020. On 13 January 2020, he moved on loan to Serie B club Trapani. On 8 September 2020 he was loaned to Vicenza.

On 17 June 2021, he moved to Vicenza on a permanent basis and signed a three-year contract.

On 31 August 2023, Dalmonte joined SPAL on loan with an option to buy and a conditional obligation to buy.

On 22 July 2024, Dalmonte signed a two-season contract with Salernitana. On 28 January 2025, he was loaned by Catania in Serie C.
