= Giuseppe De Feudis =

Italian footballer

Personal information
- Date of birth: 10 July 1983 (age 43)
- Place of birth: Bollate, Italy
- Height: 1.70 m (5 ft 7 in)
- Position: Defensive midfielder

Youth career
- Como

Senior career*
Years	Team	Apps	(Gls)
2001–2002	Como	0	(0)
2001–2002	→ San Marino (loan)	9	(0)
2002–2003	San Marino	26	(1)
2003–2011	Cesena	157	(6)
2005	→ Lucchese (loan)	14	(0)
2005–2006	→ San Marino (loan)	28	(0)
2010–2011	→ Torino (loan)	33	(1)
2011–2012	Torino	9	(1)
2013	Padova	15	(1)
2013–2015	Cesena	58	(1)
2015–2016	Lecce	15	(1)
2016–2018	Arezzo	60	(0)
2018–2020	Cesena	55	(0)
Total		479	(12)
- * Club domestic league appearances and goals

Giuseppe De Feudis (born 10 July 1983) is an Italian former professional footballer who plays as a midfielder.

== Biography ==
Born in Bollate, the province of Milan, Lombardy, De Feudis started his professional career at Lombardy side Como. After the team promoted to Serie B in 2001, he was loaned to Serie C2 side San Marino Calcio. San Marino bought him in co-ownership deal after the season, and bought him outright in June 2003.

=== Cesena ===
De Feudis was then sold to Serie C1 side Cesena, starting his long-term relationship with the Emilia–Romagna side. De Feudis made some substitute appearances for the club and won promotion to Serie B with the club in 2004. He made a few appearances in Serie B and was loaned out to Serie C1 side Lucchese in January 2005, as part of the Simone Masini deal. In the 2005–06 season, he remained in the 3rd tier of Italian football, playing for former club San Marino.

On 1 July 2006, De Feudis returned to Cesena, when the team just missed promotion by losing in the playoff semi–final first round. He became a first team player by starting 22 league matches when Cesena finished mid–table in the 2006–07 season. He then signed a new deal with the club mid–season which lasted until 2009. In the 2007–08 season, De Feudis started 37 league matches and stook with the team when Cesena was relegated back to the 1st Division, formerly known as Serie C, in 2008. In 2009, De Feudis won the 1st Division Group A title with Cesena as the club was promoted back to Serie B. He started 39 Serie B games and finished runner–up with team in 2010, winning his first ever Serie A promotion.

On 6 July 2010, he signed a new 1-year deal with Cesena for the 2010–11 Serie A season.

=== Torino ===
On 31 August he was loaned to Serie B club Torino in exchange for Nicolas Gorobsov after the club signed high caliber midfielders such as Stephen Appiah and Fabio Caserta.

He signed a permanent deal with Torino in August 2011, before he left the club for Padova in January 2013 where he wore the number 27 shirt.

=== Return to Cesena ===
On 11 July 2013, De Feudis returned his former team Cesena on a two-year contract. In the 2013–2014 season he played a key role in the team's promotion to the top flight. On 31 August 2014 he made his Serie A debut against Parma.

=== Lecce ===
On 17 July 2015 he moved to Lecce. He played 15 matches for the giallorossi and scored a goal.

=== Arezzo ===
On 11 August 2016 he was signed by Arezzo.

== Honours ==
Champion

- Lega Pro Prima Divisione: 2009

Runner–up

- Serie B: 2010
