= Daniele Capelli =

Italian footballer (born 1986)

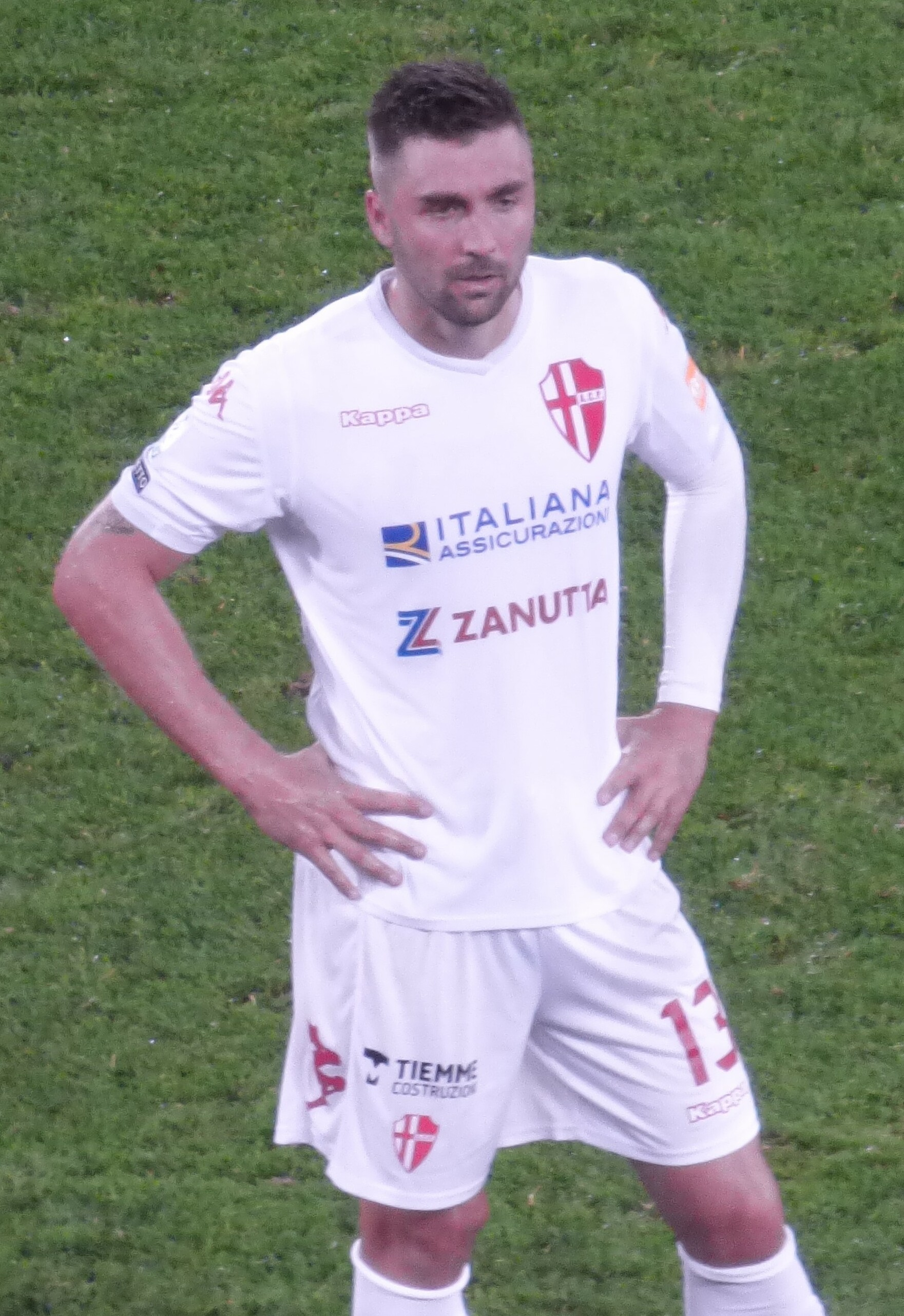
- Capelli in 2018

Personal information
- Date of birth: 20 June 1986 (age 40)
- Place of birth: Calcinate, Italy
- Height: 1.86 m (6 ft 1 in)
- Positions: Centre-back; right-back

Youth career
- 2002–2004: Atalanta

Senior career*
Years	Team	Apps	(Gls)
2004–2015	Atalanta	120	(3)
2006–2007	→ Arezzo (loan)	35	(4)
2009–2010	→ Reggina (loan)	12	(1)
2013–2015	→ Cesena (loan)	64	(1)
2015–2017	Cesena	41	(0)
2017–2018	Spezia	19	(0)
2018–2020	Padova	19	(0)

International career
2006	Italy U-20	1	(0)
- * Club domestic league appearances and goals as of 16 February 2020

Daniele Capelli (born 20 June 1986) is an Italian former footballer who played as a defender.

== Career ==
Deemed surplus to requirements prior to the beginning of the 2009–10 season, Capelli was loaned to Serie B side Reggina. However, by January 2010, Atalanta were struggling near the bottom of the table and Capelli was promptly recalled. In July 2011 Capelli signed a new four-year contract.

On 28 August 2013, Capelli was signed by A.C. Cesena in a temporary deal. On 27 June 2014, the loan was extended.

On 30 June 2015, Capelli became a free agent. On 10 July 2015 Capelli signed a two-year contract with Cesena.

On 2 July 2018, he signed a two-year contract with Serie B club Padova.
