= Carlos Carmona =

Chilean footballer (born 1987)

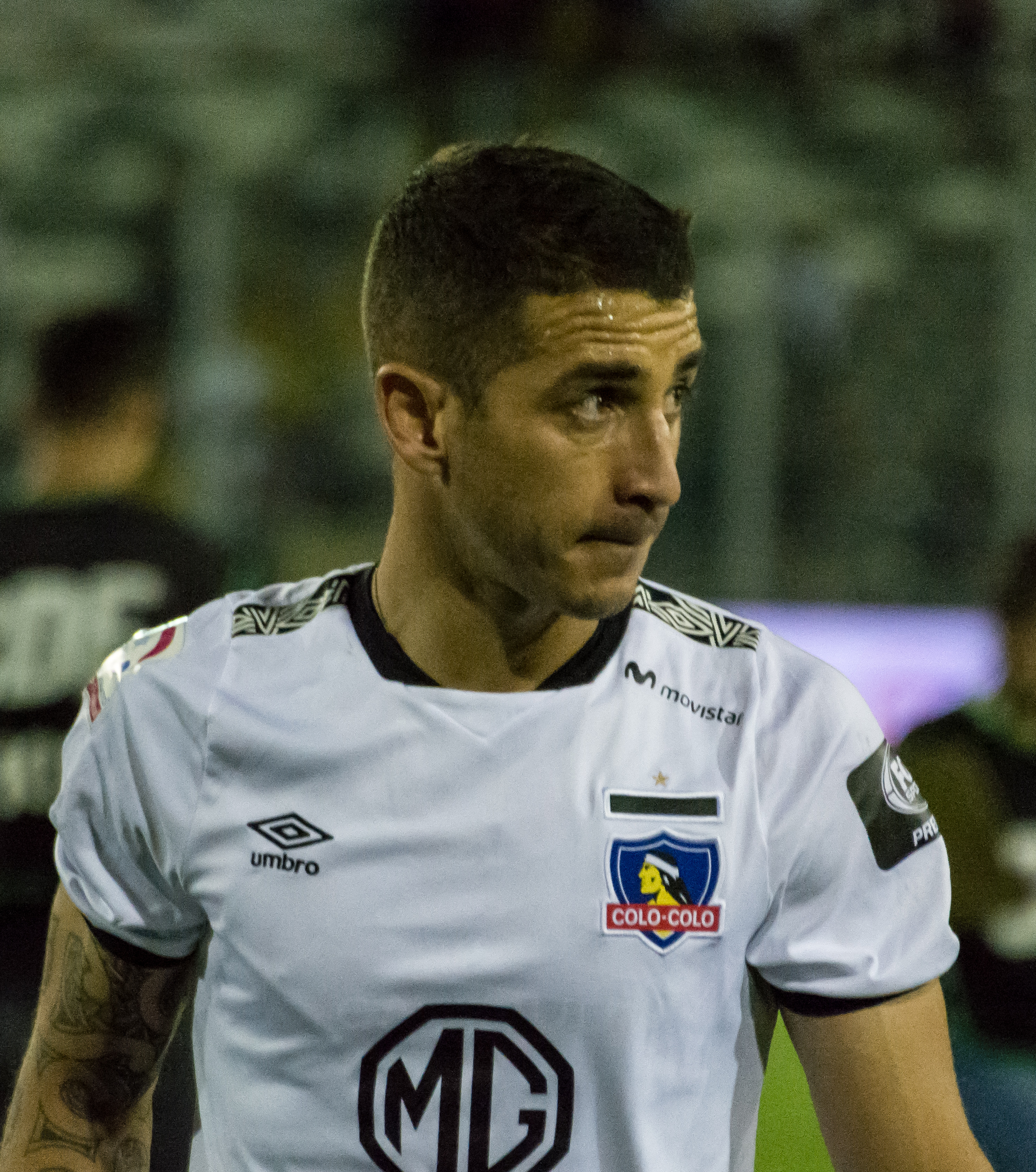
- Carmona with Colo-Colo in 2020

Personal information
- Full name: Carlos Emilio Carmona Tello
- Date of birth: 21 February 1987 (age 39)
- Place of birth: Coquimbo, Chile
- Height: 1.78 m (5 ft 10 in)
- Position: Midfielder

Youth career
- Academia Los Piratas
- Coquimbo Unido

Senior career*
Years	Team	Apps	(Gls)
2004–2007	Coquimbo Unido	92	(7)
2008	O'Higgins	17	(3)
2008–2010	Reggina	67	(0)
2010–2017	Atalanta	155	(5)
2017	Atlanta United	32	(2)
2018–2020	Colo-Colo	43	(0)
2021	Coquimbo Unido	25	(0)
Total		431	(17)

International career
2005–2007	Chile U20	20	(1)
2008–2017	Chile	50	(1)
- * Club domestic league appearances and goals

Carlos Emilio Carmona Tello (Spanish pronunciation: [ˈkaɾlos kaɾˈmona]; born 21 February 1987) is a Chilean former professional footballer who played as a midfielder.

== Club career ==
Carmona was trained at Academia Los Piratas and Coquimbo Unido. Two years later he moved to O'Higgins.

On 1 June 2008, Carmona was bought by Serie A side Reggina. He made his debut abroad on 14 September, starting and playing the full 90 minutes in a 1–1 draw against Torino. Carmona appeared in 32 matches during the campaign, which ended in relegation.

In the 2010 summer Carmona moved to Atalanta, also relegated to Serie B. He had 32 appearances as La Dea returned to the top level.

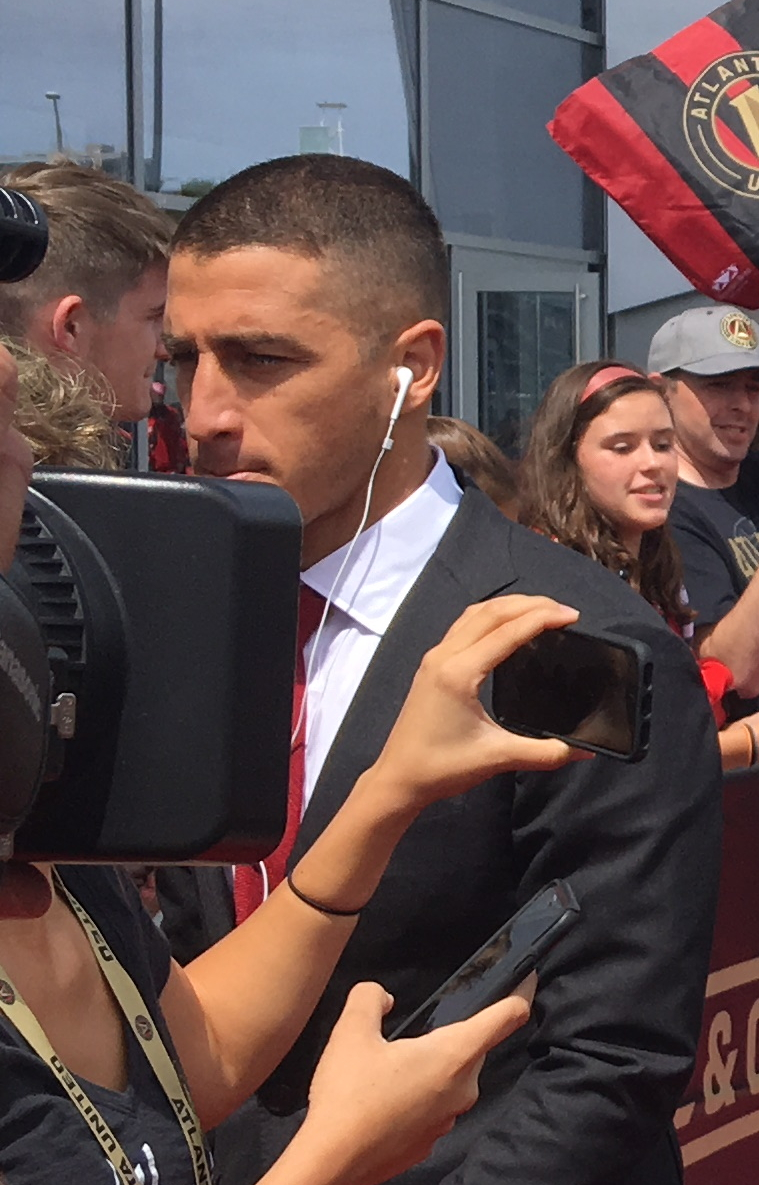
Carlos Carmona after signing the Golden Spike for Atlanta United on September 10, 2017

Carmona signed with Major League Soccer side Atlanta United on 6 February 2017. On 7 March 2017 he made his debut, receiving a red card in the 88th minute in a 1–2 loss to the New York Red Bulls. On 7 May 2017 he scored his first goal for the team in the 39th minute in a 1–3 loss to New York City FC.

In January 2018, Carmona was transferred to Chilean side Colo-Colo. After ending his contract, in February 2021, he joined his hometown team, Coquimbo Unido, at the Primera B.

In January 2022, he announced his retirement after winning the 2021 Primera B along with Coquimbo Unido.

== International career ==
=== Youth ===
Carmona was Chile's youngest player at the 2005 FIFA World Youth Championship in the Netherlands where he showed some glimpse of talent in Chile's opening game, a 7–0 win against Honduras. Two years later, he captained Chile to the 2007 FIFA U-20 World Cup where he played in a 3–0 win against Canada, a 3–0 win against Congo, a 4–0 win against Nigeria and a 1–0 win against Austria; Chile eventually were bronze medalists at the end of tournament.

His international fortunes continued as Chile's coach Marcelo Bielsa called him up for the 2008 Toulon Tournament, an Under-23 football event, where Carmona won a silver medal with his side.

=== Senior ===
On 19 November 2008, Carmona made his debut for the senior team in a 0–3 loss to Spain.

On 6 February 2013, against Egypt, Carmona scored his first goal for the national team in a 2–1 victory for the Chilean team.

Carmona was named in the 2015 Copa America squad but had to withdraw through injury and was replaced by José Pedro Fuenzalida.

=== International goals ===
Scores and results list Chile's goal tally first.

#	Date	Venue	Opponent	Score	Result	Competition
1.	6 February 2013	Vicente Calderón Stadium, Madrid, Spain	Egypt	2–0	6–1	Friendly

== Post-retirement ==
Carmona graduated as a football manager.

In September 2025, Carmona return to play football at amateur level.

== Honours ==
Atalanta

- Serie B: 2010–11

Colo Colo

- Supercopa de Chile: 2018
- Copa Chile: 2019

Coquimbo Unido

- Primera B: 2021

=== International ===
Chile

- China Cup: 2017
