= Boukary Dramé =

Senegalese footballer (born 1985)

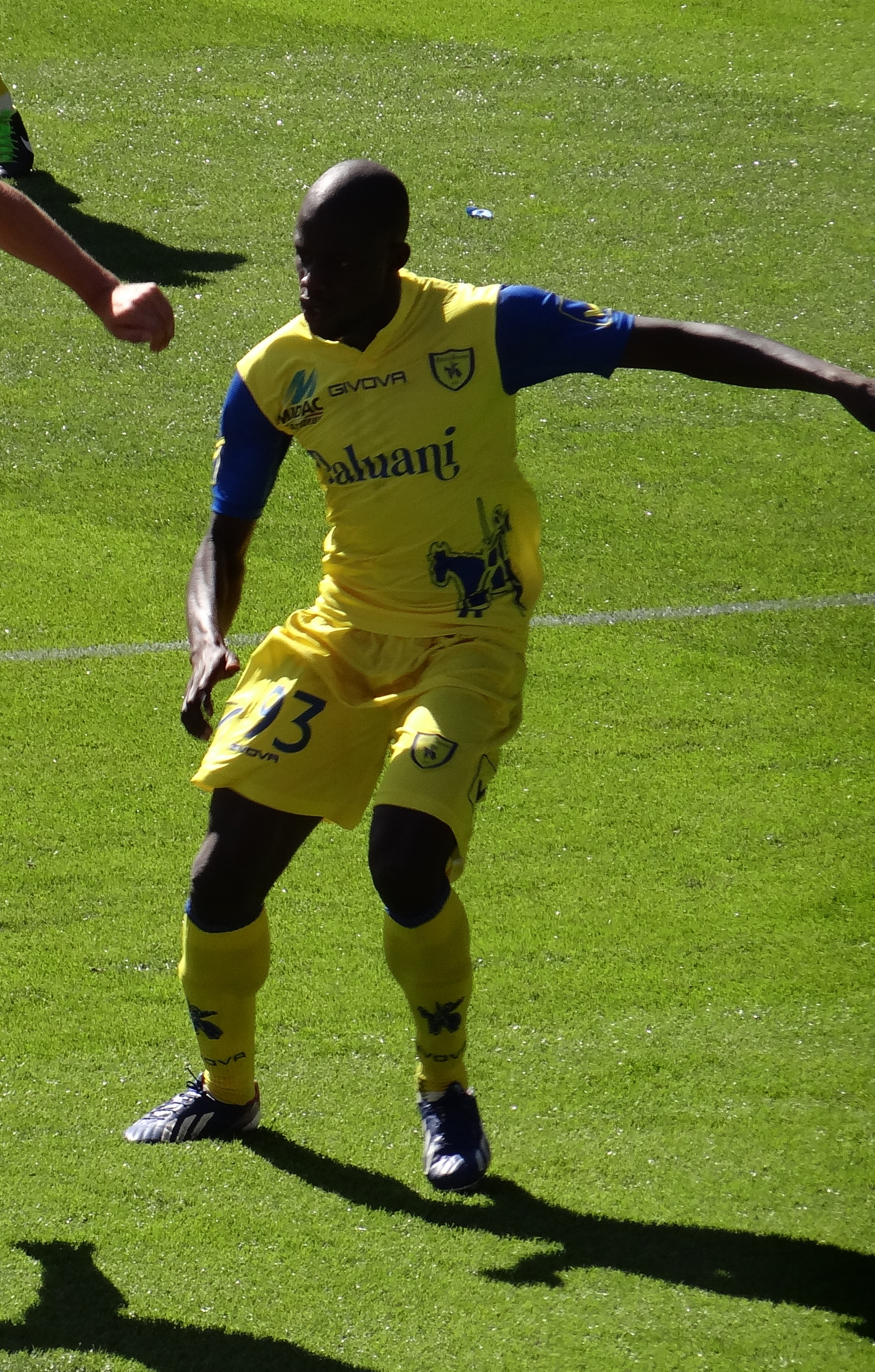
- Dramé in 2013

Personal information
- Full name: Boukary Dramé
- Date of birth: 22 July 1985 (age 41)
- Place of birth: Villepinte, Seine-Saint-Denis, France
- Height: 1.81 m (5 ft 11 in)
- Position: Left-back

Youth career
- 2000–2005: Paris Saint-Germain

Senior career*
Years	Team	Apps	(Gls)
2005–2007	Paris Saint-Germain	25	(0)
2007–2011	Sochaux	59	(2)
2008–2009	→ Real Sociedad (loan)	1	(0)
2011–2014	Chievo	77	(2)
2014–2018	Atalanta	64	(0)
2018	SPAL	5	(0)
2019–2020	Paganese	6	(0)

International career^{‡}
2005–2014	Senegal	15	(0)
- * Club domestic league appearances and goals as of 7 March 2020 ‡ National team caps and goals as of 19 November 2014

Boukary Dramé (born 22 July 1985) is a professional footballer who plays as a left-back. Born in France, he represented Senegal at international level.

== Club career ==
=== Paris Saint-Germain ===
Born in Villepinte, Seine-Saint-Denis, Dramé began playing football at CSL Aulnay-sous-Bois before joining the centre of pre-training of Paris Saint-Germain F.C. at Verneuil. Having come through the Paris Saint-Germain F.C. youth ranks, he was promoted to the first team in 2005 and played his first game in Ligue 1 on 11 September 2005 against RC Strasbourg. He went on to spend two years in the first team, with different outcomes: four matches in 2005–06, 20 in the next, with the capital outfit barely avoiding relegation in the latter.

=== Sochaux ===
In July 2007, after refusing the extension of his contract with Paris Saint-Germain in August 2007, Dramé signed a four-year deal at fellow first divisioner FC Sochaux-Montbéliard. At Sochaux, he appeared scarcely throughout his first campaign. He picked up a serious ankle sprain on his debut against former club PSG.

On 1 September 2008, Dramé joined Spanish second division's Real Sociedad on a season-long loan. He made his debut in a 2–1 win at Gimnàstic de Tarragona, his only appearance of the season. In 2009, he joined Birmingham City on trial, and was keen on a switch to the English Premier League, but did not earn himself a contract.

During the 2010–11 season Drame played 26 games for FC Sochaux-Montbéliard and scored two goals. He was sidelined with knee surgery from January for a few weeks. With his contract due to expire at the end of the season, Sochaux offered him a new deal they failed to meet Drame's wage demands. His contract expired at the end of the 2011 season and he became a free agent. Clubs like Beşiktaş, Trabzonspor, Lecce and VfB Stuttgart showed interest in the player after his release. In June 2011 Drame was linked with a move to Newcastle United.

=== Chievo ===
In August 2011, it was reported that Drame had joined Leeds United on trial. On 23 August, he was transferred from Sochaux to ChievoVerona on a free transfer.

=== Paganese ===
After not playing in the 2018–19 season, on 3 October 2019 he signed with Serie C club Paganese.
