= Stefano Lucchini =

Italian footballer (born 1980)

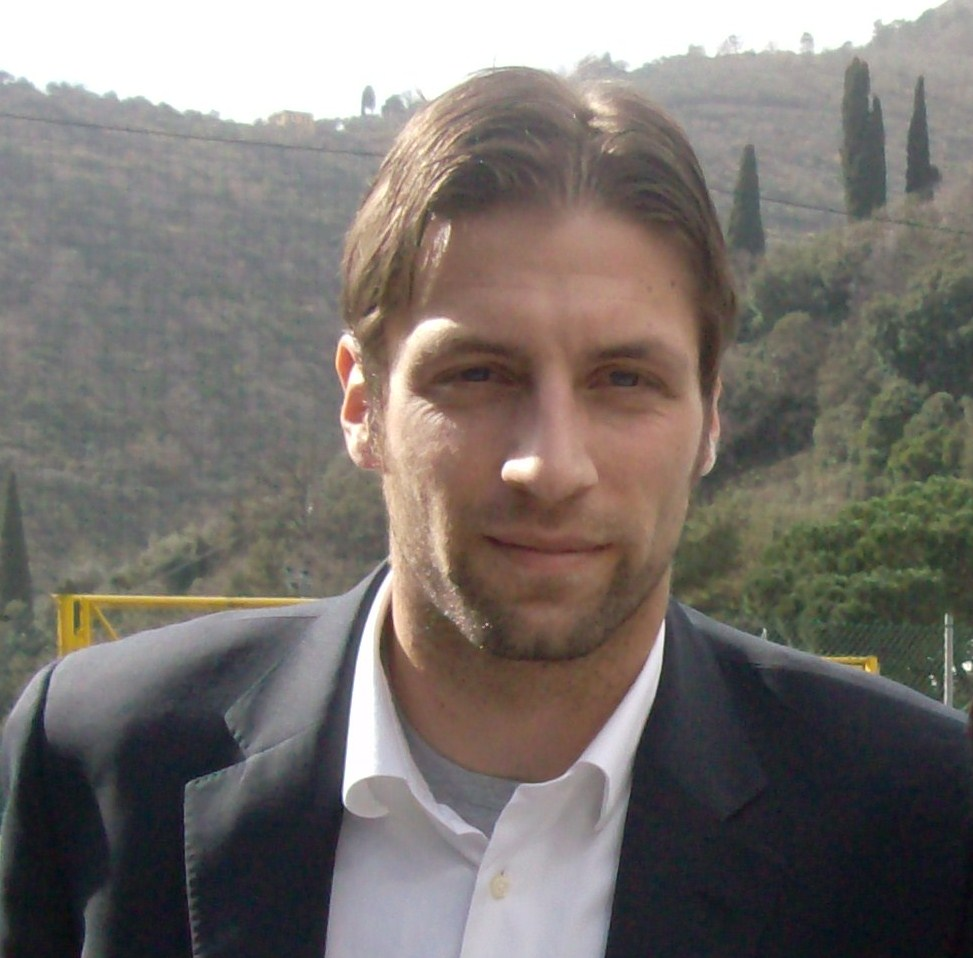
- Lucchini in 2010

Personal information
- Date of birth: 2 October 1980 (age 46)
- Place of birth: Codogno, Italy
- Height: 1.87 m (6 ft 2 in)
- Position: Centre-back

Youth career
- 1997–1998: Atalanta

Senior career*
Years	Team	Apps	(Gls)
1998–2000	Cremonese	34	(1)
2000–2002	Ternana	43	(2)
2002–2007	Empoli	126	(2)
2007–2011	Sampdoria	106	(0)
2011–2014	Atalanta	66	(0)
2014–2016	Cesena	46	(1)
2016–2017	Cremonese	15	(1)
Total		436	(7)

International career
1999–2000	Italy U20	5	(0)
2001–2002	Italy U21	12	(0)

Managerial career
- 2017–2018: Cremonese (youth)
- 2018–2020: Cremonese (U-19)
- 2020: Brescia (assistant)
- 2021–2022: Pergolettese
- * Club domestic league appearances and goals

Stefano Lucchini (born 2 October 1980) is an Italian professional football coach and a former player who played as a centre-back.

== Club career ==
=== Early career ===
Lucchini started his professional career at Cremonese. He played three games in Serie B in the 1998–99 season, and 31 games in Serie C1 in the 1999–2000 season.

After the 1999–2000 season, he was signed by Ternana of Serie B, where he made 43 appearances.

=== Empoli ===
Lucchini was signed by Empoli of Serie A in the summer of 2002, where he made his Serie A debut on 3 November 2002 against S.S. Lazio.

He played with Empoli for five seasons, following the club down to Serie B in the 2004–05 season, and subsequently helping the club win promotion back to Serie A in the summer of 2005. In the Serie A, he helped the club reach a surprising 7th position in the 2006–07 season, which gave Empoli a place in the UEFA Cup first round.

=== Sampdoria ===
Lucchini signed a pre-contract agreement with U.C. Sampdoria in March 2007. He moved to the Genoa-based club in the summer after his contract with Empoli expired. Partnered with Daniele Gastaldello, the club finished as the 4th in the 2009–10 Serie A. In the 2010–11 season, he was rotated with Massimo Volta, with Volta starting five out of six matches in the 2010–11 UEFA Europa League. Following an injury on 6 March 2011 against Cesena, he rested two matches (13 and 20 March), although he had recovered by 18 March.

On 13 July 2011, Lucchini left for the newly promoted Serie A side Atalanta.

=== Cesena ===
On 14 July 2014, Lucchini was signed by Serie A newcomers A.C. Cesena. In 2015, Cesena was relegated back to Serie B.

=== Cremonese ===
On 8 July 2016, Lucchini returned to his first club Cremonese, playing in the Lega Pro.

== International career ==
Lucchini was part of the Italy U21 national team squad that lost in the semi-finals of the 2002 UEFA European Under-21 Football Championship. Due to the strong performance of Sampdoria in the 2009–10 season, he received his first senior national team call-up in August, the first match coached by Cesare Prandelli. However, he never received another call-up after that match.

== Coaching career ==
Before the 2021–22 season, he was hired by Serie C club Pergolettese for his first professional head coach appointment. He was dismissed on 3 March 2022 due to poor results.
