= Luigi Giorgi (footballer) =

Italian footballer

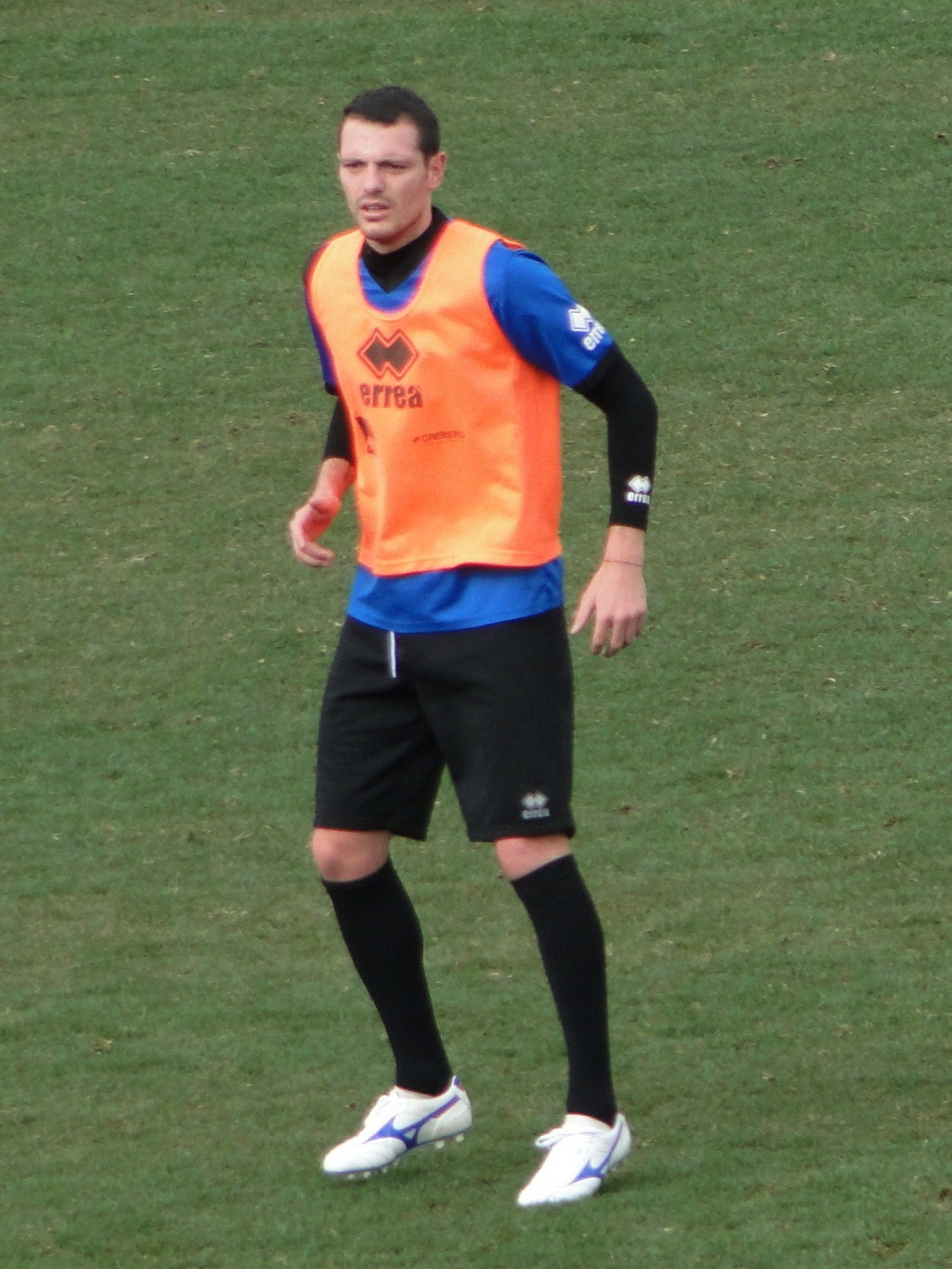
- Giorgi in 2013

Personal information
- Date of birth: 19 April 1987 (age 39)
- Place of birth: Ascoli Piceno, Italy
- Height: 1.86 m (6 ft 1 in)
- Position: Midfielder

Youth career
- Ascoli

Senior career*
Years	Team	Apps	(Gls)
2005–2011	Ascoli	91	(6)
2006–2007	→ Foligno (loan)	26	(0)
2011–2013	Novara	10	(0)
2012	→ Siena (loan)	12	(1)
2012	→ Palermo (loan)	10	(2)
2013	→ Atalanta (loan)	15	(2)
2013–2016	Atalanta	2	(0)
2014–2015	→ Cesena (loan)	27	(0)
2015–2016	→ Ascoli (loan)	23	(5)
2016–2017	Ascoli	26	(0)
2017–2018	Spezia	6	(0)
2019	Teramo	10	(0)
2019–2020	Mantova	16	(1)
Total		274	(17)
- * Club domestic league appearances and goals

Luigi Giorgi (born 19 April 1987) is an Italian former professional footballer who played as a midfielder.

== Career ==
Giorgi started his professional career with Ascoli). In the 2006–07 season Ascoli loaned him to Foligno on Serie C2 with 26 appearances. In the 2007 season Giorgi return on Serie B with Ascoli.

In 2011, he was sold to Novara for an undisclosed fee. On 16 January 2012 he transferred on loan to Siena in Serie A.

On 30 August 2012, he moved on loan to Palermo in exchange for Swedish striker Agon Mehmeti. He returned to Novara in January, but left again, this time to Atalanta.

On 9 July 2013, Atalanta signed Giorgi after a successful loan spell.

On 8 January 2019, he signed with Teramo. On 12 April 2019, he terminated his contract with the club.
