= Francesco Renzetti =

Italian footballer

Personal information
- Date of birth: 22 January 1988 (age 38)
- Place of birth: Monte Carlo, Monaco
- Height: 1.74 m (5 ft 9 in)
- Position: Left back

Team information
- Current team: ASDB Langhiranese Valparma

Youth career
- 2001–2006: Genoa

Senior career*
Years	Team	Apps	(Gls)
2005–2009	Genoa	1	(0)
2006–2007	→ Lucchese (loan)	39	(0)
2007–2008	→ Lucchese (loan)	25	(0)
2008–2009	→ Albinoleffe (loan)	39	(1)
2009–2013	Padova	140	(1)
2013–2016	Cesena	94	(0)
2016–2018	Genoa	0	(0)
2016–2017	→ Cesena (loan)	30	(1)
2017–2018	→ Cremonese (loan)	38	(0)
2018–2020	Cremonese	22	(0)
2020–2021	Chievo	47	(0)
2021–2023	Modena	37	(0)
2023–2024	Colorno Calcio		
2024–	ASDB Langhiranese Valparma		

International career
2003	Italy U15	4	(0)
2004	Italy U17	3	(2)
2008	Italy U20	3	(0)
2009	Italy U21	1	(0)
- * Club domestic league appearances and goals as of 5 October 2025

Francesco Renzetti (born 22 January 1988) is an Italian professional footballer who plays as a left back for ASDB Langhiranese Valparma. At international level, he has represented Italy's youth teams playing for the U15, U17, U20 and U21 teams.

== Club career ==
=== Genoa ===
Francesco Renzetti began his career in the Genoa youth system, eventually making one appearance in the first team for Genoa.

=== Lucchese ===
He was signed by Lucchese on a temporary basis in January 2006. The club purchased half of the registration rights of Renzetti and Emanuele Volpara for €250,000 each at the end of season.

=== AlbinoLeffe ===
Renzetti moved to AlbinoLeffe in a co-ownership deal in 2008, for €750,000 (Genoa acquired Renzetti from Lucchese for €600,000), as part of the deal that Genoa signed the remain 50% registration rights of Gleison Santos (and re-sold to Reggina) for €1M.

=== Padova ===
After making 39 appearances for Albinoleffe in Serie B, Renzetti was reacquired by Genoa for just €250,000 and subsequently resold again in co-ownership to Serie B club Padova for €500,000. He was eventually bought in full by Padova for another €1 million.

=== Cesena ===
On 12 July 2013 Renzetti joined A.C. Cesena as a free agent. He signed a new contract in January 2016, which would last until 30 June 2019 .

=== Return to Genoa ===
On 30 June 2016 Renzetti was re-signed by Genoa for €1.2 million fee. As part of the deal, Giuseppe Panico left for Cesena on loan for 2 seasons. Starting from 2015–16 season, all Serie A clubs required to have 4 club-trained players in their 25-men squad, or else the squad would be forced to be reduced by not using the place for those club-trained players. However, on 31 August Renzetti returned to Cesena in a temporary deal from Genoa. Eventually Genoa only had a 23-men squad (players born 1995 or after were not restricted, such as Giovanni Simeone), as only Mattia Perin and Lukáš Zima were used to fill the quota.

=== Cremonese ===
On 12 July 2017, Renzetti was transferred to Cremonese on loan, with an obligation to buy at the end of season. Cremonese fulfilled the obligation and he joined the club on a permanent basis on 1 July 2018.

=== Chievo ===
On 28 January 2020, he signed with Chievo until 30 June 2020.

=== Modena ===
On 30 June 2021, he joined Modena on a two-year contract.

== International career ==
Renzetti made several appearances representing Italy at various levels of their youth ranks.

== Career statistics ==
=== Club ===
As of match played 30 January 2022

Appearances and goals by club, season and competition
Club	Season	League			National Cup		League Cup		Other		Total	
Club	Season	Division	Apps	Goals	Apps	Goals	Apps	Goals	Apps	Goals	Apps	Goals
Genoa	2004–05	Serie B	0	0	0	0	—		—		0	0
Genoa	2005–06	Serie C1	1	0	0	0	—		—		1	0
Genoa	Total		1	0	0	0	0	0	0	0	1	0
Lucchese	2005–06	Serie C1	11	0	—		—		—		11	0
Lucchese	2006–07	Serie C1	27	0	1	0	—		—		28	0
Lucchese	2007–08	Serie C1	25	0	—		—		—		25	0
Lucchese	Total		63	0	1	0	0	0	0	0	64	0
Albinoleffe	2008–09	Serie B	39	1	2	0	—		—		41	1
Padova	2009–10	Serie B	31	0	1	0	—		1 (Note: Appearance(s) in Relegation Playoffs)	0	33	0
Padova	2010–11	Serie B	38	0	1	0	—		4 (Note: Appearance(s) in Promotion Playoffs)	0	43	0
Padova	2011–12	Serie B	40	0	1	0	—		—		41	0
Padova	2012–13	Serie B	31	1	0	0	—		—		31	1
Padova	Total		140	1	3	0	0	0	5	0	148	1
Cesena	2013–14	Serie B	35	0	2	0	—		4	0	41	0
Cesena	2014–15	Serie A	23	0	1	0	—		—		24	0
Cesena	2015–16	Serie B	36	0	2	0	—		1	0	39	0
Cesena (loan)	2016–17	Serie B	30	1	2	0	—		—		32	1
Cesena (loan)	Total		124	1	7	0	0	0	5	0	136	1
Cremonese (loan)	2017–18	Serie B	38	0	2	0	—		—		40	0
Cremonese	2018–19	Serie B	16	0	0	0	—		—		16	0
Cremonese	2019–20	Serie B	6	0	3	0	—		—		9	0
Cremonese	Total		60	0	5	0	0	0	0	0	65	0
Chievo	2019–20	Serie B	17	0	—		—		3	0	20	0
Chievo	2020–21	Serie B	30	0	0	0	—		—		30	0
Chievo	Total		47	0	0	0	0	0	3	0	50	0
Modena	2021–22	Serie C	11	0	—		2	0	—		13	0
Career total			485	3	18	0	2	0	13	0	518	3
