= Carlos Carbonero =

Colombian footballer (born 1990)

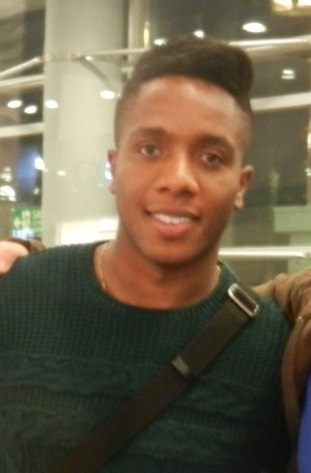

Personal information
- Full name: Carlos Mario Carbonero Mancilla
- Date of birth: 25 July 1990 (age 36)
- Place of birth: Bogotá, Colombia
- Height: 1.78 m (5 ft 10 in)
- Position: Midfielder

Senior career*
| Years | Team | Apps | (Gls) |
| 2008–2009 | Academia | 23 | (3) |
| 2009–2011 | Atlético Huila | 41 | (9) |
| 2011 | → Once Caldas (loan) | 18 | (4) |
| 2011–2015 | Estudiantes | 10 | (0) |
| 2012 | → Arsenal de Sarandí (loan) | 15 | (1) |
| 2012–2013 | → Arsenal de Sarandí (loan) | 36 | (4) |
| 2013–2014 | → River Plate (loan) | 36 | (8) |
| 2014–2015 | → Cesena (loan) | 22 | (3) |
| 2015–2017 | Fénix | 0 | (0) |
| 2015–2016 | → Sampdoria (loan) | 14 | (0) |
| 2017 | Cortuluá | 4 | (0) |
| 2018–2019 | Deportivo Cali | 14 | (0) |
| 2019 | Ferro Carril Oeste | 0 | (0) |
| 2020 | Deportivo Cali | 7 | (0) |
| 2020-2021 | Llaneros | 1 | (0) |
| 2021 | Delfines | 4 | (0) |

International career
| 2011–2014 | Colombia | 5 | (0) |
- * Club domestic league appearances and goals

Carlos Mario Carbonero Mancilla (born 25 July 1990) is a Colombian former professional footballer who played as a midfielder. Between 2011 and 2014, he earned five caps with the Colombia national team.

== Club career ==
=== Colombia ===
Carbonero began his career in the Categoría Primera B with Academia before signing for first division team Atletico Huila.

In January 2011, it was confirmed that Carbonero would join Once Caldas.

=== Argentina ===
Eventually, he signed for Estudiantes in 2011. He would only make 10 league appearances before going on loan to Arsenal de Sarandí. He scored his first goal for Arsenal in the 2012 edition of the Copa Libertadores in 3–0 win against Zamora. He netted a goal in the 2012 Tornero Clausura against San Martín in an away game that ended 4–1 in favour of Arsenal. At the end of season Arsenal won the 2012 Tornero Clausura, its first league title in history. In the 2012 Supercopa Argentina, Carbonero failed to score in the penalty shoot-out against Boca Juniors but despite this, Arsenal were still able to beat Boca 4–3 thus claiming the title.

On 4 June 2013, it was confirmed that Carbonero would go on loan once more, this time to play for Argentine River Plate.

=== Sampdoria ===
On 27 August 2015, Carbonero joined Sampdoria on loan with the option of a permanent move given to the club. On 31 August 2016, Sampdoria loaned him for a second time.

== International career ==
Carbonero made his first appearance for Colombia in 2011. In 2014, he was named the surprising late replacement for Aldo Leão Ramírez for Colombia's 2014 FIFA World Cup squad by José Pékerman. He played in one match (45 minutes versus Japan).

== Honours ==
Arsenal de Sarandi

- Argentine Primera División: 2012 Clausura
- Supercopa Argentina: 2012

River Plate

- Argentine Primera División: Torneo Final 2014
- Argentine Super Liga Final: 2014
