= 2011–12 Atalanta BC season =

Atalanta
2011–12 season
- Chairman: Antonio Percassi
- Manager: Stefano Colantuono
- Serie A: 12th
- Coppa Italia: Third round
- Top goalscorer: League: Germán Denis (16); All: Germán Denis (16)
Home colours	Away colours	Third colours

The 2011–12 season was Atalanta Bergamasca Calcio's 104th season in existence, and its first season back in Serie A following promotion the 2011–12 Serie A started on 30 July.

== Players ==
As of 5 September 2011

Note: Flags indicate national team as defined under FIFA eligibility rules; some limited exceptions apply. Players may hold more than one non-FIFA nationality.

No.	Pos.	Nation	Player
3	DF	ITA	Stefano Lucchini
4	DF	ITA	Daniele Capelli
5	DF	ITA	Thomas Manfredini
6	DF	ITA	Gianpaolo Bellini (captain)
7	MF	ITA	Ezequiel Schelotto
10	MF	ITA	Giacomo Bonaventura
11	MF	ARG	Maxi Moralez
13	DF	ITA	Federico Peluso
17	MF	CHI	Carlos Carmona
19	FW	ARG	Germán Denis (on loan from Udinese)
21	MF	ITA	Luca Cigarini (on loan from Napoli)
23	MF	ITA	Leonardo Pettinari

No.	Pos.	Nation	Player
25	DF	ITA	Andrea Masiello
26	MF	ITA	Fabio Caserta
28	FW	ITA	Manolo Gabbiadini
32	DF	ITA	Michele Ferri
33	MF	ITA	Matteo Brighi (on loan from Roma)
47	GK	ITA	Andrea Consigli
63	FW	ITA	Matteo Ardemagni
77	MF	ITA	Cristian Raimondi
78	GK	ITA	Giorgio Frezzolini
79	MF	BRA	Adriano Ferreira Pinto
88	MF	ITA	Nadir Minotti
89	FW	ITA	Guido Marilungo
90	FW	ITA	Simone Tiribocchi

== Competitions ==
=== Serie A ===
==== League table ====
Pos	Team	Pld	W	D	L	GF	GA	GD	Pts
10	Chievo	38	12	13	13	35	45	−10	49
11	Catania	38	11	15	12	47	52	−5	48
12	Atalanta (Note: Atalanta were deducted 6 points due to involvement in the 2011–12 Italian football scandal.)	38	13	13	12	41	43	−2	46 (Note: Atalanta finished ahead of Fiorentina on head–to–head away goals scored: Atalanta 2–0 Fiorentina, Fiorentina 2–2 Atalanta.)
13	Fiorentina	38	11	13	14	37	43	−6	46
14	Siena	38	11	11	16	45	45	0	44

Source: Lega Serie A
Rules for classification: 1) points; 2) head-to-head points; 3) head-to-head goal difference; 4) head-to-head goals scored; 5) goal difference; 6) number of goals scored

==== Results summary ====
Overall								Home						Away					
Pld	W	D	L	GF	GA	GD	Pts	W	D	L	GF	GA	GD	W	D	L	GF	GA	GD
38	13	13	12	41	43	−2	52	9	6	4	23	15	+8	4	7	8	18	28	−10

Last updated: 17 May 2012.
Source: Competitive matches

==== Results by round ====
Round	1	2	3	4	5	6	7	8	9	10	11	12	13	14	15	16	17	18	19	20	21	22	23	24	25	26	27	28	29	30	31	32	33	34	35	36	37	38
Ground	H	A	H	A	H	A	H	A	H	A	H	A	H	A	H	A	H	A	H	A	H	A	H	A	H	A	H	A	H	A	H	A	H	A	H	A	H	A
Result	W	D	W	W	W	L	D	W	D	L	W	D	D	D	L	D	D	L	L	W	W	L	D	D	W	D	D	D	W	L	L	W	W	L	W	L	L	L
Position	2	2	2	1	1	2	1	1	1	5	5	5	5	5	5	5	8	8	8	8	7	7	8	9	7	7	8	9	7	8	8	8	8	8	7	8	9	9

Updated to match(es) played on 17 May 2012. Source: Competitive matches
A = Away; H = Home; W = Win; D = Draw; L = Loss

==== Matches ====
The fixtures for the 2011–12 Serie A season were announced by the Lega Serie A on 27 July.

11 September 2011 2	Genoa	2–2	Atalanta	Genoa
15:00 CEST (UTC+02:00)	Veloso 6'; Bovo (yellow card) 17'; Mesto 54'; Palacio (yellow card) 58'		Moralez 8', 43'	Stadium: Stadio Luigi Ferraris; Attendance: 19,917; Referee: Nicola Rizzoli

18 September 2011 3	Atalanta	1–0	Palermo	Bergamo
12:30 CEST (UTC+02:00)	Denis 34'			Stadium: Stadio Atleti Azzurri d'Italia; Attendance: 12,368; Referee: Andrea De Marco

21 September 2011 4	Lecce	1–2	Atalanta	Lecce
20:45 CEST (UTC+02:00)	Mesbah 25'		Denis 3' (pen.), 56'	Stadium: Stadio Via del Mare; Attendance: 8,090; Referee: Gianluca Rocchi

25 September 2011 5	Atalanta	2–1	Novara	Bergamo
15:00 CEST (UTC+02:00)	Schelotto 34'; Cigarini 59'		Porcari 89'	Stadium: Stadio Atleti Azzurri d'Italia; Attendance: 13,910; Referee: Emilio Ostinelli

1 October 2011 6	Roma	3–1	Atalanta	Rome
18:00 CEST (UTC+02:00)	Bojan 20'; Osvaldo 31'; Simplício 81'		Denis 48'	Stadium: Stadio Olimpico; Attendance: 36,200; Referee: Domenico Celi

16 October 2011 7	Atalanta	0–0	Udinese	Bergamo
15:00 CEST (UTC+02:00)				Stadium: Stadio Atleti Azzurri d'Italia; Attendance: 15,444; Referee: Andrea Gervasoni

23 October 2011 8	Parma	1–2	Atalanta	Parma
15:00 CEST (UTC+02:00)	Valdés 80'		Moralez 55', 58'	Stadium: Stadio Ennio Tardini; Attendance: 13,003; Referee: Christian Brighi

26 October 2011 9	Atalanta	1–1	Internazionale	Bergamo
20:45 CEST (UTC+02:00)	Denis 44'		Sneijder 32'	Stadium: Stadio Atleti Azzurri d'Italia; Attendance: 19,613; Referee: Paolo Valeri

30 October 2011 10	Bologna	3–1	Atalanta	Bologna
15:00 CET (UTC+01:00)	Di Vaio 45+3' (pen.); Ramírez 48'; Loria 68'		Denis 7'	Stadium: Stadio Renato Dall'Ara; Attendance: 17,870; Referee: Mauro Bergonzi

6 November 2011 11	Atalanta	1–0	Cagliari	Bergamo
15:00 CET (UTC+01:00)	Denis 80'			Stadium: Stadio Atleti Azzurri d'Italia; Attendance: 11,604; Referee: Piero Giacomelli

20 November 2011 12	Siena	2–2	Atalanta	Siena
15:00 CET (UTC+01:00)	D'Agostino 44' (pen.); Gazzi 87'		Denis 15' (pen.), 53'	Stadium: Stadio Artemio Franchi – Montepaschi Arena; Attendance: 8,526; Referee: Daniele Doveri

26 November 2011 13	Atalanta	1–1	Napoli	Bergamo
20:45 CET (UTC+01:00)	Denis 64'		Cavani 90+4'	Stadium: Stadio Atleti Azzurri d'Italia; Attendance: 17,827; Referee: Daniele Orsato

4 December 2011 14	ChievoVerona	0–0	Atalanta	Verona
15:00 CET (UTC+01:00)	Pellissier (yellow card) 37'; Andreolli (yellow card) 39'		Lucchini (yellow card) 16'; Manfredini (yellow card) 37'	Stadium: Stadio Marc'Antonio Bentegodi; Attendance: 12,000; Referee: Riccardo Pinzani

11 December 2011 15	Atalanta	1–1	Catania	Bergamo
15:00 CET (UTC+01:00)	Carmona (yellow card) 42'; Bellini (yellow card) 56'; Tiribocchi (yellow card) 58' (goal) 71'		Spolli (yellow card) 12' (yellow-red card) 43'; Legrottaglie 18'; Marchese (yellow card) 34'; Delvecchio (yellow card) 35'	Stadium: Stadio Atleti Azzurri d'Italia; Attendance: 13,716; Referee: Antonio Giannoccaro

17 December 2011 16	Fiorentina	2–2	Atalanta	Florence
20:45 CET (UTC+01:00)	Gilardino 9'; Behrami (yellow card) 45'; Jovetić 88'		Cigarini (yellow card) 61'; Masiello 81' (yellow card) 90+6'; Denis 85'	Stadium: Stadio Artemio Franchi; Attendance: 15,812; Referee: Sebastiano Peruzzo

5 January 2012 1	Atalanta	4–1	Cesena	Bergamo
20:45 CET (UTC+01:00)	Denis 17' (pen.); Marilungo 18', 44'; Carmona (yellow card) 24'; Peluso 71'		Candreva 11'; Guana (yellow card) 18'; Ghezzal (yellow card) 41'; Mutu (yellow card) 78'	Stadium: Stadio Atleti Azzurri d'Italia; Attendance: 16,081; Referee: Carmine Russo

8 January 2012 17	Atalanta	0–2	Milan	Bergamo
15:00 CET (UTC+01:00)	Carmona (yellow card) 31'; Manfredini (yellow card) 74'; Cigarini (yellow card) 80'; Denis (yellow card) 90+1'		Ibrahimović 22' (pen.); Boateng (yellow card) 18' (goal) 82'; Bonera (yellow card) 82'	Stadium: Stadio Atleti Azzurri d'Italia; Attendance: 22,172; Referee: Nicola Rizzoli

15 January 2012 18	Lazio	2–0	Atalanta	Rome
12:30 CET (UTC+01:00)	Hernanes 20' (pen.); Dias (yellow card) 28'; Diakité (yellow card) 64'; Klose 90+1'		Carmona (yellow card) 7'; Lucchini (yellow card) 43' (yellow-red card) 53'	Stadium: Stadio Olimpico; Attendance: 27,438; Referee: Luca Banti

21 January 2012 19	Atalanta	0–2	Juventus	Bergamo
20:45 CET (UTC+01:00)	Raimondi (yellow card) 45'; Marilungo (yellow card) 67'		Lichtsteiner (yellow card) 51'; Lichtsteiner 55'; Giaccherini 81'	Stadium: Stadio Atleti Azzurri d'Italia; Attendance: 22,335; Referee: Domenico Celi

29 January 2012 20	Cesena	0–1	Atalanta	Cesena
15:00 CET (UTC+01:00)	Rennella (yellow card) 41'; Guana (yellow card) 85'		Padoin (yellow card) 21'; Denis (yellow card) 25' (yellow-red card) 79'; Rossi 76' (o.g.); Raimondi (yellow card) 77'; Schelotto (yellow card) 83'	Stadium: Stadio Dino Manuzzi; Attendance: 15,315; Referee: Paolo Tagliavento

15 February 2012 21	Atalanta	1–0	Genoa	Bergamo
18:30 CET (UTC+01:00)	Stendardo (yellow card) 56'; Marilungo 78'; Manfredini (yellow card) 84'		Sculli (yellow card) 21'	Stadium: Stadio Atleti Azzurri d'Italia; Attendance: 15,302; Referee: Gabriele Gava

5 February 2012 22	Palermo	2–1	Atalanta	Palermo
15:00 CET (UTC+01:00)	Miccoli 29' (pen.); Budan 49'; Zahavi (yellow card) 61'; Mantovani (yellow card) 90'		Consigli (red card) 26'; Raimondi (yellow card) 48'; Moralez 56', (yellow card) 59'; Cigarini (yellow card) 83'	Stadium: Stadio Renzo Barbera; Attendance: 15,302; Referee: Christian Brighi

12 February 2012 23	Atalanta	0–0	Lecce	Bergamo
15:00 CET (UTC+01:00)	Raimondi (yellow card) 75'		Giacomazzi (yellow card) 81'; Miglionico (yellow card) 83'	Stadium: Stadio Atleti Azzurri d'Italia; Attendance: 11,877; Referee: Andrea Gervasoni

19 February 2012 24	Novara	0–0	Atalanta	Novara
15:00 CET (UTC+01:00)	Pesce (yellow card) 49' (yellow-red card) 90+2'			Stadium: Stadio Comunale Silvio; Attendance: 9,000; Referee: Luca Banti

26 February 2012 25	Atalanta	4–1	Roma	Bergamo
15:00 CET (UTC+01:00)	Marilungo 10'; Denis 19', 47', 66'; Moralez (yellow card) 45+2'; Cigarini (yellow card) 53'; Manfredini (yellow card) 59'; Peluso (yellow card) 87'		Gago (yellow card) 21'; Borini 36'; Osvaldo (red card) 53'; Greco (yellow card) 79'; Cassetti (red card) 82'	Stadium: Stadio Atleti Azzurri d'Italia; Attendance: 16,117; Referee: Antonio Damato

4 March 2012 26	Udinese	0–0	Atalanta	Udine
15:00 CET (UTC+01:00)		Report		Stadium: Stadio Friuli; Attendance: 16,000; Referee: Antonio Giannoccaro

11 March 2012 27	Atalanta	1–1	Parma	Bergamo
15:00 CET (UTC+01:00)	Manfredini 5'		Paletta 55'	Stadium: Stadio Atleti Azzurri d'Italia; Attendance: 14,210; Referee: Andrea Gervasoni

18 March 2012 28	Internazionale	0–0	Atalanta	Milan
15:00 CET (UTC+01:00)	Milito (penalty missed) 23'; Lúcio (yellow card) 60'; Samuel (yellow card) 85'		Bellini (yellow card) 22'; Cigarini (yellow card) 32'; Moralez (yellow card) 75'; Carmona (yellow card) 86'	Stadium: San Siro; Attendance: 38,619; Referee: Gabriele Gava

25 March 2012 29	Atalanta	2–0	Bologna	Bergamo
12:30 CET (UTC+01:00)	Cigarini (yellow card) 41'; Gabbiadini 50'; Tiribocchi 90+1'		Mudingayi (yellow card) 60'; Pérez (red card) 66'; Pulzetti (yellow card) 66'; Diamanti (yellow card) 71'; Raggi (yellow card) 78'	Stadium: Stadio Atleti Azzurri d'Italia; Attendance: 13,600; Referee: Leonardo Baracani

1 April 2012 30	Cagliari	2–0	Atalanta	Cagliari
15:00 CEST (UTC+02:00)	Conti 11'; Pinilla 54'			Stadium: Stadio Sant'Elia; Attendance: 5,000; Referee: Gianluca Rocchi

7 April 2012 31	Atalanta	1–2	Siena	Bergamo
15:00 CEST (UTC+02:00)	Schelotto 9'; Stendardo (yellow card) 40'; Manfredini (yellow card) 89'		Larrondo 13' (pen.); Terzi (yellow card) 86'; Giorgi (yellow card) 90'; Destro 90+1'	Stadium: Stadio Atleti Azzurri d'Italia; Attendance: 15,508; Referee: Carmine Russo

11 April 2012 32	Napoli	1–3	Atalanta	Naples
20:45 CEST (UTC+02:00)	Lavezzi 13'; Grava (yellow card) 31'; Fernández (yellow card) 54'; Pandev (red card) 69'; Džemaili (yellow card) 88'		Bonaventura 10'; Denis (yellow card) 17'; Cazzola (yellow card) 42'; Peluso (yellow card) 50'; Bellini 58'; Carmona 68'; Lucchini (yellow card) 72'; Stendardo (yellow card) 74'; Mutarelli (yellow card) 81'	Stadium: Stadio San Paolo; Attendance: 35,519; Referee: Antonio Giannoccaro

21 April 2012 34	Catania	2–0	Atalanta	Catania
20:45 CEST (UTC+02:00)	Gómez 31'; Lanzafame (yellow card) 44'; Legrottaglie (yellow card) 51'; Seymour 85'; Bellusci (yellow card) 90+4'		Carmona (yellow card) 86'; Peluso (yellow card) 90+1'	Stadium: Stadio Angelo Massimino; Attendance: 14,446; Referee: Andrea Romeo

24 April 2012 33	Atalanta	1–0	ChievoVerona	Bergamo
18:30 CEST (UTC+02:00)	Moralez 72'			Stadium: Stadio Atleti Azzurri d'Italia; Attendance: 15,045; Referee: Dino Tommasi

29 April 2012 35	Atalanta	2–0	Fiorentina	Bergamo
15:00 CEST (UTC+02:00)	Denis 11'; Bonaventura 51'; Cazzola (yellow card) 59'; Raimondi (yellow card) 66'; Manfredini (yellow card) 72'; Peluso (yellow card) 75'		Cassani (yellow card) 38'; Camporese (yellow card) 40'	Stadium: Stadio Atleti Azzurri d'Italia; Attendance: 14,714; Referee: Daniele Doveri

6 May 2012 36	Milan	2–0	Atalanta	Milan
15:00 CEST (UTC+02:00)	Muntari 9'; Robinho 90'			Stadium: San Siro; Attendance: 38,204; Referee: Marco Guida

13 May 2012 37	Atalanta	0–2	Lazio	Bergamo
15:00 CEST (UTC+02:00)	Minotti (yellow card) 75'; Stendardo (red card) 81'; Manfredini (yellow card) 86'; Carrozza (yellow card) 89'		Kozák 35'; Candreva (yellow card) 70'; González (yellow card) 80'; Cana 90'	Stadium: Stadio Atleti Azzurri d'Italia; Attendance: 16,293; Referee: Gianluca Rocchi

17 May 2012 38	Juventus	3–1	Atalanta	Turin
15:00 CEST (UTC+02:00)	Marrone 10'; Del Piero 28'; Barzagli 90' (pen.)		Lichtsteiner 83' (o.g.)	Stadium: Juventus Stadium; Attendance: 40,944; Referee: Gabriele Gava

=== Coppa Italia ===
21 August 2011 Third round	Atalanta	3–4	Gubbio	Bergamo
20:45 CEST (UTC+02)	Moralez 30'; Tiribocchi 38'; Gabbiadini 78'	Report	Bazzoffia 22'; Giannetti 48', 52', 87'	Stadium: Stadio Atleti Azzurri d'Italia; Attendance: 3,556; Referee: Gabriele Gava

== Statistics ==
=== Appearances and goals ===
No.	Pos	Nat	Player	Total		Serie A		Coppa Italia	
No.	Pos	Nat	Player	Apps	Goals	Apps	Goals	Apps	Goals
Goalkeepers
1	GK	(Poland) POL	Przemysław Frąckowiak	0	0	0	0	0	0
16	GK	(Italy) ITA	Ciro Polito	1	0	1	0	0	0
47	GK	(Italy) ITA	Andrea Consigli	36	0	35	0	1	0
78	GK	(Italy) ITA	Giorgio Frezzolini	4	0	2+2	0	0	0
Defenders
2	DF	(Italy) ITA	Guglielmo Stendardo	16	0	15+1	0	0	0
3	DF	(Italy) ITA	Stefano Lucchini	27	0	24+2	0	1	0
4	DF	(Italy) ITA	Daniele Capelli	11	0	9+2	0	0	0
5	DF	(Italy) ITA	Thomas Manfredini	27	0	25+1	0	1	0
6	DF	(Italy) ITA	Gianpaolo Bellini	20	1	12+8	1	0	0
13	DF	(Italy) ITA	Federico Peluso	34	1	33	1	1	0
20	DF	(Italy) ITA	Luca Milesi	0	0	0	0	0	0
25	DF	(Italy) ITA	Andrea Masiello	18	1	17	1	1	0
32	DF	(Italy) ITA	Michele Ferri	13	0	8+5	0	0	0
Midfielders
7	MF	(Italy) ITA	Ezequiel Schelotto	38	2	33+4	2	0+1	0
10	MF	(Italy) ITA	Giacomo Bonaventura	30	2	20+9	2	1	0
11	MF	(Argentina) ARG	Maximiliano Moralez	35	7	31+3	6	1	1
17	MF	(Chile) CHI	Carlos Carmona	29	6	24+4	6	1	0
18	MF	(Italy) ITA	Alessandro Carrozza	12	0	3+9	0	0	0
20	MF	(Italy) ITA	Massimo Mutarelli	1	0	0+1	0	0	0
21	MF	(Italy) ITA	Luca Cigarini	34	2	32+2	2	0	0
27	MF	(Italy) ITA	Cristiano Doni	0	0	0	0	0	0
33	MF	(Italy) ITA	Matteo Brighi	11	0	8+3	0	0	0
44	MF	(Italy) ITA	Riccardo Cazzola	12	0	5+7	0	0	0
77	MF	(Italy) ITA	Cristian Raimondi	13	0	10+3	0	0	0
79	MF	(Brazil) BRA	Ferreira Pinto	13	4	1+6	0	5+1	4
88	MF	(Italy) ITA	Nadir Minotti	3	0	3	0	0	0
Forwards
19	FW	(Argentina) ARG	Germán Denis	33	16	32+1	16	0	0
28	FW	(Italy) ITA	Manolo Gabbiadini	24	2	8+15	1	1	1
89	FW	(Italy) ITA	Guido Marilungo	19	4	9+9	4	1	0
90	FW	(Italy) ITA	Simone Tiribocchi	13	2	5+8	2	0	0
Players transferred out during the season
22	FW	(Italy) ITA	Simone Padoin	21	0	19+1	0	1	0
23	MF	(Italy) ITA	Leonardo Pettinari (loan)	1	0	1	0	0	0
26	MF	(Italy) ITA	Fabio Caserta (loan)	2	0	1	0	1	0

Last updated: 13 May 2012
Source: Competitions

=== Goalscorers ===
Rank	No.	Pos	Nat	Name	Serie A	Coppa Italia	Total
1	19	FW	(Argentina)	Germán Denis	16	0	16
2	11	MF	(Argentina)	Maximiliano Moralez	6	1	7
3	89	FW	(Italy)	Guido Marilungo	4	0	4
4	90	FW	(Italy)	Simone Tiribocchi	2	1	3
5	10	MF	(Italy)	Giacomo Bonaventura	2	0	2
5	7	MF	(Italy)	Ezequiel Schelotto	2	0	2
5	28	FW	(Italy)	Manolo Gabbiadini	1	1	2
8	6	DF	(Italy)	Gianpaolo Bellini	1	0	1
8	3	MF	(Chile)	Carlos Carmona	1	0	1
8	21	MF	(Italy)	Luca Cigarini	1	0	1
8	5	DF	(Italy)	Thomas Manfredini	1	0	1
8	25	DF	(Italy)	Andrea Masiello	1	0	1
8	27	DF	(Italy)	Federico Peluso	1	0	1
Own goal					0	0	0
Totals					39	3	42

Last updated: 13 May 2012
