= Ervin Zukanović =

Bosnian footballer (born 1987)

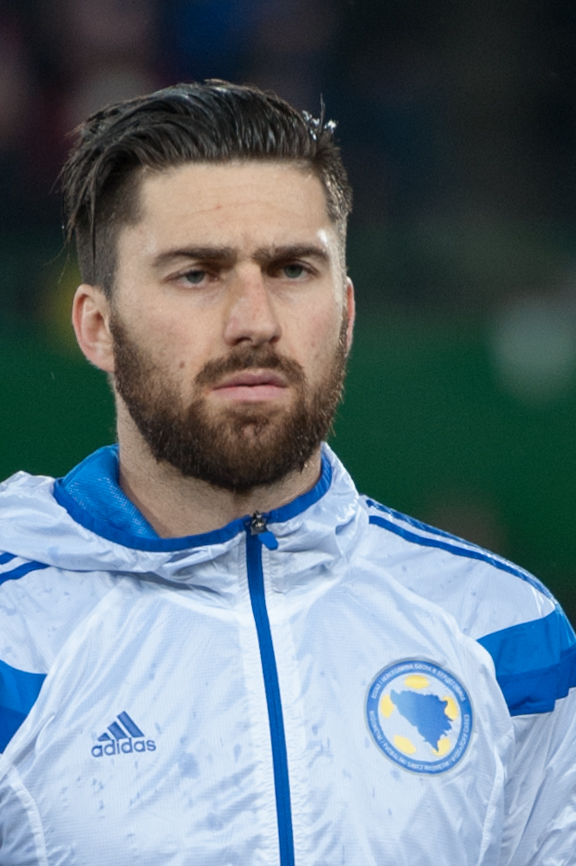
- Zukanović with Bosnia and Herzegovina in 2015

Personal information
- Date of birth: 11 February 1987 (age 39)
- Place of birth: Sarajevo, SR Bosnia and Herzegovina, SFR Yugoslavia
- Height: 1.90 m (6 ft 3 in)
- Position: Centre-back

Youth career
- Željezničar

Senior career*
Years	Team	Apps	(Gls)
2005–2006	Željezničar	7	(0)
2006–2007	Austria Lustenau II	20	(0)
2007–2008	Velež	0	(0)
2008	Sulzberg	7	(1)
2008	KFC Uerdingen	9	(0)
2009–2010	Dender	53	(2)
2010–2011	Eupen	36	(3)
2011–2013	Kortrijk	56	(8)
2013–2015	Gent	34	(2)
2014–2015	→ Chievo (loan)	29	(2)
2015–2016	Sampdoria	16	(3)
2016–2018	Roma	9	(0)
2016–2017	→ Atalanta (loan)	19	(0)
2017–2018	→ Genoa (loan)	31	(0)
2018–2019	Genoa	25	(0)
2019–2020	Al-Ahli	3	(0)
2020	SPAL	3	(0)
2020–2022	Fatih Karagümrük	38	(3)
2022–2024	Asteras Tripolis	39	(4)
Total		434	(28)

International career
2012–2019	Bosnia and Herzegovina	38	(0)

Managerial career
- 2024–2025: Čelik Zenica (assistant)
- 2025: Igman Konjic (assistant)
- * Club domestic league appearances and goals

Ervin Zukanović (pronounced [ěrʋin zukâːnoʋitɕ]; born 11 February 1987) is a Bosnian former professional footballer who played as a centre-back.

Zukanović started his professional career at Željezničar. After leaving the club, he had short spells with Austria Lustenau II, Velež, Sulzberg and KFC Uerdingen, before settling in Belgium, where he played for Dender, Eupen, Kortrijk and Gent. In 2014, he was loaned to Chievo. The following year, Zukanović was transferred to Sampdoria. One year after, he switched to Roma, who loaned him to Atalanta in 2016 and to Genoa in 2017, with whom he signed permanently a year later. In 2019, Zukanović joined Al-Ahli. The following year, he moved to SPAL. Later that year, he signed with Fatih Karagümrük. In 2022, he joined Asteras Tripolis.

Zukanović made his senior international debut for Bosnia and Herzegovina in 2012, earning over 30 caps until 2019.

== Club career ==
=== Early career ===
Zukanović came through the youth academy of his hometown club Željezničar. He made his professional debut in 2005 at the age of 18. After leaving the team, he had short spells with mostly lower-league sides like Austria Lustenau II, Sulzberg and KFC Uerdingen.

In January 2009, he joined Belgian outfit Dender. On 7 March, he scored his first professional goal against Genk.

In July 2010, Zukanović switched to Eupen.

In June 2011, he was transferred to Kortrijk.

In December 2012, he moved to Gent.

=== Chievo ===
In June 2014, Zukanović was loaned to Italian side Chievo until the end of the season. He made his official debut for the team on 24 September against Sampdoria. On 26 October, he scored his first goal for Chievo against Genoa.

In June 2015, Chievo signed him on a four-year deal.

=== Sampdoria ===
In July, Zukanović was transferred to Sampdoria for an undisclosed fee. He made his competitive debut for the squad in a UEFA Europa League qualifier against Vojvodina on 30 July. A month later, he made his league debut against Napoli. On 25 October, he scored his first goal for Sampdoria in a triumph over Hellas Verona.

=== Roma ===
In January 2016, Zukanović was sent on a six-month loan to Roma, with an option to make the transfer permanent. He debuted officially for the club against Frosinone on 30 January. In March, Roma exercised their buy clause and signed him on a contract until June 2019. Zukanović debuted in the UEFA Champions League away at Real Madrid on 8 March.

In July, he was sent on a season-long loan to Atalanta.

=== Genoa ===
In July 2017, Zukanović was loaned to Genoa for the remainder of the campaign. He debuted competitively for the side against Lazio on 17 September.

In June 2018, Genoa signed him on a three-year deal.

=== Later stage of career ===
In August 2019, Zukanović was transferred to Saudi Arabian outfit Al-Ahli.

In January 2020, he signed with SPAL.

In August, he joined Turkish team Fatih Karagümrük.

In August 2022, he moved to Greek side Asteras Tripolis.

He announced his retirement from football on 16 July 2024.

== International career ==
In October 2012, Zukanović received his first senior call up to Bosnia and Herzegovina, for 2014 FIFA World Cup qualifiers against Greece and Lithuania. He debuted against the latter on 16 October.

Zukanović was selected in Bosnia and Herzegovina's preliminary squad for the 2014 FIFA World Cup. He failed to join the team, which had a training camp in the United States, due to visa problems. However, he later blamed the Bosnian FA, which subsequently got him dropped from the team.

He retired from international football on 20 October 2020.

== Managerial career ==
In August 2024, Zukanović was appointed as Čelik Zenica's assistant coach.

In August 2025, he was announced as Igman Konjic's assistant coach.

== Personal life ==
Zukanović married his long-time girlfriend Emina in July 2011. Together they have three children, a daughter named Alin and two sons named Armin and Din.

He is a practising Muslim; together with international teammates Ibrahim Šehić, Muhamed Bešić, Armin Hodžić, Izet Hajrović, Sead Kolašinac and Edin Višća he visited a mosque in Zenica during the national team's concentration.

Zukanović possesses Belgian passport since 2015.

== Career statistics ==
=== Club ===
Appearances and goals by club, season and competition
Club	Season	League			National cup (Note: Includes Belgian Cup, Coppa Italia, Turkish Cup, Greek Cup)		Continental		Total	
Club	Season	Division	Apps	Goals	Apps	Goals	Apps	Goals	Apps	Goals
Željezničar	2005–06	Bosnian Premier League	7	0	0	0	–		7	0
Austria Lustenau II	2006–07	Austrian Regionalliga West	20	0	0	0	–		20	0
Sulzberg	2007–08	Vorarlbergliga	7	1	–		–		7	1
KFC Uerdingen	2008–09	Oberliga Niederrhein	9	0	–		–		9	0
Dender	2008–09	Belgian Pro League	20	1	0	0	–		20	1
Dender	2009–10	Challenger Pro League	33	1	2	0	–		35	1
Dender	Total		53	2	2	0	–		55	2
Eupen	2010–11	Belgian Pro League	36	3	1	0	–		37	3
Kortrijk	2011–12	Belgian Pro League	35	3	7	1	–		42	4
Kortrijk	2012–13	Belgian Pro League	21	5	2	0	–		23	5
Kortrijk	Total		56	8	9	1	–		65	9
Gent	2012–13	Belgian Pro League	15	0	1	0	–		16	0
Gent	2013–14	Belgian Pro League	19	2	3	0	–		22	2
Gent	Total		34	2	4	0	–		38	2
Chievo (loan)	2014–15	Serie A	29	2	0	0	–		29	2
Sampdoria	2015–16	Serie A	16	3	1	0	2 (Note: Appearances in UEFA Europa League)	0	19	3
Roma	2015–16	Serie A	9	0	–		1 (Note: Appearance in UEFA Champions League)	0	10	0
Atalanta (loan)	2016–17	Serie A	19	0	0	0	–		19	0
Genoa (loan)	2017–18	Serie A	31	0	0	0	–		31	0
Genoa	2018–19	Serie A	25	0	2	0	–		27	0
Genoa	Total		56	0	2	0	–		58	0
Al-Ahli	2019–20	Saudi Pro League	3	0	0	0	0	0	3	0
SPAL	2019–20	Serie A	3	0	–		–		3	0
Fatih Karagümrük	2020–21	Süper Lig	17	3	0	0	–		17	3
Fatih Karagümrük	2021–22	Süper Lig	21	0	2	1	–		23	1
Fatih Karagümrük	Total		38	3	2	1	–		40	4
Asteras Tripolis	2022–23	Super League Greece	18	1	1	0	–		19	1
Asteras Tripolis	2023–24	Super League Greece	21	3	0	0	–		21	3
Asteras Tripolis	Total		39	4	1	0	–		40	4
Career total			434	28	22	2	3	0	459	30

=== International ===
Appearances and goals by national team and year
National team	Year	Apps	Goals
Bosnia and Herzegovina
Bosnia and Herzegovina	2012	2	0
Bosnia and Herzegovina	2013	4	0
Bosnia and Herzegovina	2014	0	0
Bosnia and Herzegovina	2015	6	0
Bosnia and Herzegovina	2016	6	0
Bosnia and Herzegovina	2017	5	0
Bosnia and Herzegovina	2018	9	0
Bosnia and Herzegovina	2019	6	0
Total		38	0
