= Maximiliano Pellegrino =

Argentine footballer

Personal information
- Full name: Maximiliano Nicolás Pellegrino Luna
- Date of birth: January 26, 1980 (age 46)
- Place of birth: Córdoba Province, Argentina
- Height: 1.89 m (6 ft 2 in)
- Position: Centre back

Youth career
- Vélez Sarsfield

Senior career*
Years	Team	Apps	(Gls)
1999–2007	Vélez Sarsfield	157	(9)
2007–2011	Atalanta	45	(2)
2010–2011	→ Cesena (loan)	30	(0)
2011–2013	Colón	55	(1)
2013–2015	All Boys	60	(3)
2017	Sarmiento de Leones	19	(2)
- * Club domestic league appearances and goals

Maximiliano Nicolás Pellegrino Luna (born January 26, 1980, in Leones, Córdoba Province) is an Argentine retired footballer, who played as centre back.

== Career ==
Before his move to Italy for the start of the 2007–08 season, he had spent his whole professional career for Buenos Aires club Vélez Sarsfield. On 24 June 2010, Atalanta loaned the defender to Cesena along with Fabio Caserta, as part of the deal that sign Ezequiel Schelotto outright.

After the season-long on loan to Cesena, his contract with Atalanta finished, and he was moved to Colón on a free transfer.

== Personal life ==
Maximiliano is the younger brother of former Argentina defender Mauricio Pellegrino.

== Honours ==
Vélez Sársfield

- Primera División Argentina (1): 2005 Clausura
