= 2018–19 Brighton & Hove Albion F.C. season =

117th season in existence of Brighton & Hove Albion

Brighton & Hove Albion
2018–19 season
- Chairman: Tony Bloom
- Manager: Chris Hughton
- Stadium: Falmer Stadium
- Premier League: 17th
- FA Cup: Semi-finals
- EFL Cup: Second round
- Top goalscorer: League: Glenn Murray (13); All: Glenn Murray (15)
- Highest home attendance: 30,654 vs Wolverhampton Wanderers (27 October 2018 - Premier League)
- Lowest home attendance: 13,651 vs Southampton (28 August 2018 - EFL Cup)
- Average home league attendance: 30,464
- Biggest win: 3–1 vs Crystal Palace (4 December 2018 - Premier League)
- Biggest defeat: 0–5 vs Bournemouth (13 April 2019 - Premier League)
Home colours	Away colours	Third colours

The 2018–19 season was Brighton & Hove Albion's 117th year in existence and second consecutive season in the Premier League. Along with competing in the Premier League, the club also participated in the FA Cup and EFL Cup.

The season covers the period from 1 July 2018 to 30 June 2019.

Brighton beat Manchester United at home for the second season running on 19 August 2018. The game finished 3–2 to the Albion. On 4 May 2019 Brighton's Premier League status was confirmed for a third season after bitter rivals Crystal Palace beat Cardiff 3–2 in Wales. This confirmation came exactly a year after The Seagulls secured their safety in the 2017–18 season.

In the FA Cup Brighton made the semi-final where they lost to Manchester City 1–0 at Wembley. In the EFL Cup Brighton lost 1–0 to Southampton at home in the second round.

On 10 May 2019 it was announced that captain, Bruno would be retiring from football. In his last game Brighton lost 4–1 to Manchester City. As a result City defended their Premier League title.

Brighton sacked manager Chris Hughton on 13 May, one day after the final game of the season, due to a poor end of season run of three wins in 23 games meaning Brighton narrowly secured survival by two points.

On 20 May Brighton appointed Graham Potter as the new manager.

== Players ==
=== Squad ===
Note: Flags indicate national team as defined under FIFA eligibility rules; some limited exceptions apply. Players may hold more than one non-FIFA nationality.

No.	Pos.	Nation	Player
1	GK	AUS	Mathew Ryan
2	DF	ESP	Bruno (club captain)
3	DF	CMR	Gaëtan Bong
4	DF	IRL	Shane Duffy
5	DF	ENG	Lewis Dunk (vice-captain)
6	MF	ENG	Dale Stephens
7	MF	ISR	Beram Kayal
8	MF	MLI	Yves Bissouma
9	FW	NED	Jürgen Locadia
10	FW	ROU	Florin Andone
11	MF	FRA	Anthony Knockaert
13	MF	GER	Pascal Groß

No.	Pos.	Nation	Player
14	DF	NGA	Leon Balogun
16	FW	IRN	Alireza Jahanbakhsh
17	FW	ENG	Glenn Murray
19	FW	COL	José Izquierdo
20	MF	ENG	Solly March
22	DF	ESP	Martín Montoya
23	GK	ENG	Jason Steele
24	MF	NED	Davy Pröpper
27	GK	ENG	David Button
30	DF	BRA	Bernardo
33	DF	ENG	Dan Burn

=== Out on loan ===
Note: Flags indicate national team as defined under FIFA eligibility rules; some limited exceptions apply. Players may hold more than one non-FIFA nationality.

No.	Pos.	Nation	Player
21	DF	ITA	Ezequiel Schelotto (at Chievo until 30 June 2019)
25	FW	ISR	Tomer Hemed (at Queens Park Rangers until 30 June 2019)
26	FW	RSA	Percy Tau (at Saint-Gilloise until 30 June 2019)
29	DF	AUT	Markus Suttner (at Fortuna Düsseldorf until 30 June 2019)

No.	Pos.	Nation	Player
31	GK	ENG	Christian Walton (at Wigan Athletic until 30 June 2019)
35	DF	ENG	Ben Barclay (at Notts County until 30 June 2019)
36	FW	IRL	Richie Towell (at Rotherham United until 30 June 2019)
—	MF	ARG	Alexis Mac Allister (at Argentinos Juniors until 30 June 2019)

== Transfers ==
=== Transfers in ===
Date from	Position	No.	Name	From	Fee	Joining squad	Ref.
1 July 2018	CF	10	(Romania) Florin Andone	(Spain) Deportivo La Coruña	Undisclosed (Note: Fee reported as £5.250,000)	First Team	
1 July 2018	CB	14	(Nigeria) Leon Balogun	(Germany) Mainz 05	Free transfer	First Team	
1 July 2018	GK	23	(England) Jason Steele	(England) Sunderland	Free transfer	First Team	
1 July 2018	LB	-	(England) Joe Tomlinson	(England) Yeovil Town	Free transfer	Academy	
5 July 2018	LB	30	(Brazil) Bernardo	(Germany) RB Leipzig	Undisclosed (Note: Fee reported as £9,000,000)	First Team	
9 July 2018	GK	-	(Finland) Hugo Keto	(England) Arsenal	Free transfer	Academy	
16 July 2018	GK	27	(England) David Button	(England) Fulham	Undisclosed	First Team	
17 July 2018	CM	8	(Mali) Yves Bissouma	(France) Lille	Undisclosed	First Team	
20 July 2018	ST	26	(South Africa) Percy Tau	(South Africa) Mamelodi Sundowns	Undisclosed	First Team	
25 July 2018	RW	16	(Iran) Alireza Jahanbakhsh	(Netherlands) AZ Alkmaar	Undisclosed (Note: Fee reported as £17,000,000)	First Team	
7 August 2018	LW	-	(Ecuador) Billy Arce	(Ecuador) Independiente del Valle	Undisclosed	Academy	
7 August 2018	RW	-	(Denmark) Anders Dreyer	(Denmark) Esbjerg	Undisclosed	Academy	
9 August 2018	CB	-	(England) Dan Burn	(England) Wigan Athletic	£3,000,000	First Team	
9 August 2018	LM	-	(Sweden) Peter Gwargis	(Sweden) Jönköpings Södra	Undisclosed	Academy	
9 August 2018	RB	22	(Spain) Martín Montoya	(Spain) Valencia	£6,300,000	First Team	
24 January 2019	AM	—	(Argentina) Alexis Mac Allister	(Argentina) Argentinos Juniors	Undisclosed	First Team	
31 January 2019	DM	—	(Romania) Tudor Băluță	(Romania) Viitorul Constanța	Undisclosed	Academy	
31 January 2019	CF	—	(Slovenia) Jan Mlakar	(Slovenia) Maribor	Undisclosed	Academy	

=== Transfers out ===
Date from	Position	No.	Name	To	Fee	Leaving squad	Ref.
1 July 2018	RW	(England)	David Ajiboye	(England) Worthing	Released	Academy	
1 July 2018	CF	(Kenya)	Jonah Ayunga	(England) Sutton United	Released	Academy	
1 July 2018	RW	(Norway)	Henrik Bjørdal	(Belgium) Zulte Waregem	Undisclosed	Academy	
1 July 2018	CB	(England)	Tom Dallison	(Scotland) Falkirk	Free transfer	Academy	
1 July 2018	CB	(England)	Connor Goldson	(Scotland) Rangers	Undisclosed	First Team	
1 July 2018	RB	(England)	Tyler Hornby-Forbes	(Wales) Newport County	Released	Academy	
1 July 2018	CB	(Germany)	Uwe Hünemeier	(Germany) SC Paderborn	Free transfer	First Team	
1 July 2018	DM	(Republic of Ireland)	Dessie Hutchinson	(Republic of Ireland) Waterford	Released	Academy	
1 July 2018	DM	(England)	Rohan Ince	Free agent	Released	First Team	
1 July 2018	RB	(Portugal)	Mamadou Koné	Free agent	Released	Academy	
1 July 2018	GK	(Netherlands)	Tim Krul	(England) Norwich City	Released	First Team	
1 July 2018	GK	(Finland)	Niki Mäenpää	(England) Bristol City	Rejected contract	First Team	
1 July 2018	LW	(England)	Reece Meekums	(England) Bromley	Released	Academy	
1 July 2018	LW	(Scotland)	Jamie Murphy	(Scotland) Rangers	Undisclosed	First Team	
1 July 2018	LB	(Republic of Ireland)	Rian O'Sullivan	Free agent	Released	Academy	
1 July 2018	RB	(England)	Liam Rosenior	Retired	Released	First Team	
1 July 2018	CM	(England)	Steve Sidwell	Retired	Mutual consent	First Team	
1 July 2018	GK	(England)	Bailey Vose	(England) Colchester United	Undisclosed	Academy	
30 July 2018	FW	(England)	Sam Baldock	(England) Reading	Undisclosed	First Team	
2 August 2018	LW	(Czech Republic)	Jiří Skalák	(England) Millwall	Undisclosed	First Team	
3 December 2018	AM	(Republic of Ireland)	Danny Mandroiu	(Republic of Ireland) Bohemians	Undisclosed	Academy	
17 December 2018	AM	(England)	Jayden Onen	(England) Brentford	Free transfer	Academy	
2 January 2019	RW	(England)	Jordan Maguire-Drew	(England) Leyton Orient	Undisclosed	Academy	
4 January 2019	CM	(Northern Ireland)	Oliver Norwood	(England) Sheffield United	Undisclosed	First Team	
28 January 2019	CM	(Norway)	Mathias Normann	(Russia) Rostov	Undisclosed	Academy	

=== Loans out ===
Date from	Position	No.	Name	To	Date until	Leaving squad	Ref.
1 July 2018	CB	(Northern Ireland)	Ben Hall	(England) Notts County	4 January 2019	Academy	
1 July 2018	GK	(Spain)	Robert Sánchez	(England) Forest Green Rovers	31 May 2019	Academy	
1 July 2018	GK	(England)	Christian Walton	(England) Wigan Athletic	31 May 2019	First Team	
2 July 2018	SS	(England)	Steven Alzate	(England) Swindon Town	9 January 2019	Academy	
12 July 2018	RB	(Czech Republic)	Aleš Matějů	(Italy) Brescia	31 May 2019	Academy	
28 July 2018	GK	(England)	Tom McGill	(England) Worthing	31 August 2018	Academy	
1 August 2018	RW	(England)	Jordan Maguire-Drew	(Wales) Wrexham	2 January 2019	First Team	
7 August 2018	LW	(Ecuador)	Billy Arce	(Spain) Extremadura	9 January 2019	Academy	
9 August 2018	CB	(England)	Dan Burn	(England) Wigan Athletic	January 2019	First Team	
13 August 2018	CM	(Northern Ireland)	Oliver Norwood	(England) Sheffield United	4 January 2019	First Team	
15 August 2018	CF	(South Africa)	Percy Tau	(Belgium) Union Saint-Gilloise	31 May 2019	Academy	
23 August 2018	CF	(Israel)	Tomer Hemed	(England) Queens Park Rangers	31 May 2019	First Team	
28 August 2018	CF	(Serbia)	Bojan Radulovic	(Spain) Espanyol B	31 May 2019	Academy	
31 August 2018	GK	(England)	Tom McGill	(England) Greenwich Borough	4 January 2019	Academy	
31 August 2018	DF	(England)	Joe Tomlinson	(England) Bognor Regis Town	31 May 2019	Academy	
31 August 2018	CM	(Republic of Ireland)	Richie Towell	(England) Rotherham United	31 May 2019	First Team	
26 October 2018	CB	(Denmark)	Matthew Weaire	(England) Gosport Borough	December 2018	Academy	
3 January 2019	CB	(England)	Ben White	(England) Peterborough United	31 May 2019	Academy	
4 January 2019	CB	(England)	Ben Barclay	(England) Notts County	31 May 2019	Academy	
7 January 2019	LB	(England)	George Cox	(England) Northampton Town	31 May 2019	Academy	
7 January 2019	CB	(Scotland)	Josh Kerr	(Republic of Ireland) Derry City	31 May 2019	Academy	
12 January 2019	GK	(England)	Tom McGill	(England) Basingstoke Town	Youth loan	Academy	
18 January 2019	LB	(Austria)	Markus Suttner	(Germany) Fortuna Düsseldorf	31 May 2019	First Team	
18 January 2019	AM	(England)	James Tilley	(Republic of Ireland) Cork City	31 May 2019	Academy	
24 January 2019	AM	(Argentina)	Alexis Mac Allister	(Argentina) Argentinos Juniors	31 May 2019	First Team	
26 January 2019	RW	(Denmark)	Anders Dreyer	(Scotland) St Mirren	31 May 2019	Academy	
28 January 2019	RB	(Italy)	Ezequiel Schelotto	(Italy) Chievo Verona	31 May 2019	First Team	
31 January 2019	DM	(Romania)	Tudor Băluță	(Romania) Viitorul Constanța	31 May 2019	Academy	
31 January 2019	CF	(Republic of Ireland)	Aaron Connolly	(England) Luton Town	31 May 2019	Academy	
31 January 2019	CF	(Slovenia)	Jan Mlakar	(Slovenia) Maribor	31 May 2019	Academy	
31 January 2019	CF	(Iceland)	Stefan Ljubicic	(England) Eastbourne Borough	30 April 2019	Academy	
5 February 2019	LW	(Ecuador)	Billy Arce	(Ecuador) Emelec	31 December 2019	Academy	
11 February 2019	GK	(Finland)	Hugo Keto	(Republic of Ireland) Waterford	30 June 2019	Academy	

== Pre-season ==
Brighton & Hove Albion announced five pre-season friendlies against St. Gallen, Wimbledon, Charlton Athletic, Birmingham City, and FC Nantes^{†}.

14 July 2018 Friendly	St. Gallen	1–1	Brighton & Hove Albion	St. Gallen, Switzerland
14:00 CEST	Ben Khalifa 44'	Report	Hemed 59'	Stadium: kybunpark

21 July 2018 Friendly	AFC Wimbledon	2–1	Brighton & Hove Albion	Wimbledon
15:00 BST	Pigott 15'; Appiah 31'	Report	Norwood 65'	Stadium: Kingsmeadow

24 July 2018 Friendly	Charlton Athletic	1–1	Brighton & Hove Albion	Charlton
19:45 BST	Sarr 82'	Report	Groß 47'	Stadium: The Valley; Attendance: 2,256

28 July 2018 Friendly	Birmingham City	1–1	Brighton & Hove Albion	Birmingham
15:00 BST	Kieftenbeld 31'	Report	Bissouma 90+1'	Stadium: St Andrew's

3 August 2018 Friendly	Brighton & Hove Albion	2–1	FC Nantes	Falmer
19:45 BST	Hemed 37'; Groß 48'	Report	Rongier 80'	Stadium: Amex Stadium

^{†} The opponents for this match were supposed to be Sporting Clube de Portugal but were replaced by FC Nantes due to Sporting being unable to fulfil the fixture.

== Competitions ==
=== Premier League ===
==== League table ====
Pos	Team	Pld	W	D	L	GF	GA	GD	Pts	Qualification or relegation
15	Burnley	38	11	7	20	45	68	−23	40	
16	Southampton	38	9	12	17	45	65	−20	39	
17	Brighton & Hove Albion	38	9	9	20	35	60	−25	36	
18	Cardiff City (R)	38	10	4	24	34	69	−35	34	Relegation to EFL Championship
19	Fulham (R)	38	7	5	26	34	81	−47	26	Relegation to EFL Championship

Source: Premier League
Rules for classification: 1) Points; 2) Goal difference; 3) Goals scored; 4) Play-offs (only if needed to decide champion, teams for relegation or teams for UEFA competitions).
(R) Relegated

==== Results summary ====
Overall								Home						Away					
Pld	W	D	L	GF	GA	GD	Pts	W	D	L	GF	GA	GD	W	D	L	GF	GA	GD
38	9	9	20	35	60	−25	36	6	5	8	19	28	−9	3	4	12	16	32	−16

Last updated: 12 May 2019.
Source: Premier League

==== Results by matchday ====
Matchday	1	2	3	4	5	6	7	8	9	10	11	12	13	14	15	16	17	18	19	20	21	22	23	24	25	26	27	28	29	30	31	32	33	34	35	36	37	38
Ground	A	H	A	H	A	H	A	H	A	H	A	A	H	A	H	A	H	A	H	H	A	H	A	A	H	H	A	H	A	H	A	H	H	A	A	H	A	H
Result	L	W	L	D	D	L	L	W	W	W	L	L	D	W	W	L	L	L	D	W	D	L	L	L	D	L	L	W	W	L	L	L	L	D	L	D	D	L
Position	17	11	12	12	14	13	14	12	12	11	12	12	12	11	10	11	13	13	13	13	13	13	13	13	13	14	16	15	15	15	15	17	17	17	17	17	17	17

Updated to match(es) played on 12 May 2019. Source: Statto.com
A = Away; H = Home; W = Win; D = Draw; L = Loss

==== Matches ====
On 14 June 2018, the Premier League fixtures for the forthcoming season were announced.

11 August 2018 1	Watford	2–0	Brighton & Hove Albion	Watford
15:00 BST	Pereyra 35', 54'	Report		Stadium: Vicarage Road; Attendance: 20,051; Referee: Jonathan Moss

19 August 2018 2	Brighton & Hove Albion	3–2	Manchester United	Falmer
16:00 BST	Murray 25'; Duffy 27'; Groß 44' (pen.)	Report	Lukaku 34'; Pogba 90+5' (pen.)	Stadium: Amex Stadium; Attendance: 30,592; Referee: Kevin Friend

25 August 2018 3	Liverpool	1–0	Brighton & Hove Albion	Liverpool
17:30 BST	Salah 23'	Report		Stadium: Anfield; Attendance: 53,294; Referee: Chris Kavanagh

1 September 2018 4	Brighton & Hove Albion	2–2	Fulham	Falmer
15:00 BST	Stephens (yellow card) 45'; Pröpper (yellow card) 52'; Murray (yellow card) 59', (goal) 67', 84' (pen.)	Report	Schürrle 43'; Mitrović 62', (yellow card) 84'; Johansen (yellow card) 82'; Le Marchand (yellow card) 90+4'	Stadium: Amex Stadium; Attendance: 30,526; Referee: Lee Probert

17 September 2018 5	Southampton	2–2	Brighton & Hove Albion	Southampton
20:00 BST	Højbjerg 35'; Ings 64' (pen.)	Report	Duffy 67'; Murray 90+1' (pen.)	Stadium: St Mary's Stadium; Attendance: 28,811; Referee: Anthony Taylor

22 September 2018 6	Brighton & Hove Albion	1–2	Tottenham Hotspur	Falmer
17:30 BST	Kayal (yellow card) 61'; Bissouma (yellow card) 74'; Knockaert 90+3'	Report	Kane 42' (pen.); Trippier (yellow card) 49'; Lamela 76'	Stadium: Amex Stadium; Attendance: 30,531; Referee: Chris Kavanagh

29 September 2018 7	Manchester City	2–0	Brighton & Hove Albion	Manchester
15:00 BST	Sterling 29'; Agüero 65'	Report	Knockaert (yellow card) 9'; Duffy (yellow card) 42'; Montoya (yellow card) 87'	Stadium: Etihad Stadium; Attendance: 54,152; Referee: Lee Mason

5 October 2018 8	Brighton & Hove Albion	1–0	West Ham United	Falmer
20:00 BST	Murray 25'; Duffy (yellow card) 33'; Jahanbakhsh (yellow card) 58'; Kayal (yellow card) 61'	Report	Arnautović (yellow card) 57'; Snodgrass (yellow card) 88'	Stadium: Amex Stadium; Attendance: 30,544; Referee: Kevin Friend

20 October 2018 9	Newcastle United	0–1	Brighton & Hove Albion	Newcastle upon Tyne
15:00 BST		Report	Kayal 29', (yellow card) 43'; Jahanbakhsh (yellow card) 74'	Stadium: St James' Park; Attendance: 50,329; Referee: Andre Marriner

27 October 2018 10	Brighton & Hove Albion	1–0	Wolverhampton Wanderers	Falmer
15:00 BST	Murray 48'; Dunk (yellow card) 77'; Kayal (yellow card) 52'; Knockaert (yellow card) 90'	Report		Stadium: Amex Stadium; Attendance: 30,654; Referee: Anthony Taylor

3 November 2018 11	Everton	3–1	Brighton & Hove Albion	Liverpool
15:00 GMT	Richarlison 26', 77'; Coleman 50'	Report	Dunk (yellow card) 10', (goal) 33'	Stadium: Goodison Park; Attendance: 38,966; Referee: David Coote

10 November 2018 12	Cardiff City	2–1	Brighton & Hove Albion	Cardiff
12:30 GMT	Paterson 28'; Bamba 90'	Report	Dunk 6'; Stephens (red card) 34'	Stadium: Cardiff City Stadium; Attendance: 29,402; Referee: Martin Atkinson

24 November 2018 13	Brighton & Hove Albion	1–1	Leicester City	Falmer
15:00 GMT	Murray 15'; Duffy (yellow card) 60'; Bruno (yellow card) 66'; Izquierdo (yellow card) 72'	Report	Maddison (yellow card) 26' (yellow-red card) 28'; Ndidi (yellow card) 39'; Vardy 79' (pen.)	Stadium: Amex Stadium; Attendance: 30,553; Referee: Chris Kavanagh

1 December 2018 14	Huddersfield Town	1–2	Brighton & Hove Albion	Huddersfield
15:00 GMT	Jorgensen 1'; Mounié (red card) 32'	Report	Duffy 45+4'; Andone 69'; Bruno (yellow card) 39'; Balogun (yellow card) 82'	Stadium: John Smith's Stadium; Attendance: 22,973; Referee: Michael Oliver

4 December 2018 15	Brighton & Hove Albion	3–1	Crystal Palace	Falmer
19:45 GMT	Murray 24' (pen.); Duffy (red card) 28'; Balogun 31'; Andone 45+4'	Report	Milivojević 81' (pen.)	Stadium: Amex Stadium; Attendance: 29,663; Referee: Kevin Friend

8 December 2018 16	Burnley	1–0	Brighton & Hove Albion	Burnley
15:00 GMT	Tarkowski 40', (yellow card) 86'; Bardsley (yellow card) 90+2'	Report		Stadium: Turf Moor; Attendance: 18,497; Referee: Martin Atkinson

16 December 2018 17	Brighton & Hove Albion	1–2	Chelsea	Falmer
13:30 GMT	Dunk (yellow card) 55'; March 66'; Andone (yellow card) 70'	Report	Pedro 17'; Hazard 33'; Alonso (yellow card) 87'; Kepa (yellow card) 90'	Stadium: Amex Stadium; Attendance: 30,645; Referee: Stuart Attwell

22 December 2018 18	Bournemouth	2–0	Brighton & Hove Albion	Bournemouth
15:00 GMT	Brooks 21', 77', (yellow card) 43'; Lerma (yellow card) 31'	Report	Dunk (yellow card) 62' (yellow-red card) 73'	Stadium: Vitality Stadium; Attendance: 10,491; Referee: Mike Dean

26 December 2018 19	Brighton & Hove Albion	1–1	Arsenal	Falmer
17:15 GMT	Locadia 35'; Montoya (yellow card) 45+2'; Murray (yellow card) 58'	Report	Aubameyang 7'; Kolašinac (yellow card) 81'	Stadium: Amex Stadium; Attendance: 30,608; Referee: Anthony Taylor

29 December 2018 20	Brighton & Hove Albion	1–0	Everton	Falmer
15:00 GMT	Locadia 59'	Report	Bernard (yellow card) 53'; Mina (yellow card) 56'	Stadium: Amex Stadium; Attendance: 30,597; Referee: Andrew Madley

2 January 2019 21	West Ham United	2–2	Brighton & Hove Albion	Stratford
19:45 GMT	Arnautović 66', 68'	Report	Stephens 56'; Duffy 58'; March (yellow card) 80'	Stadium: London Stadium; Attendance: 59,870; Referee: Chris Kavanagh

12 January 2019 22	Brighton & Hove Albion	0–1	Liverpool	Falmer
15:00 GMT		Report	Salah 50' (pen.)	Stadium: Amex Stadium; Attendance: 30,682; Referee: Kevin Friend

19 January 2019 23	Manchester United	2–1	Brighton & Hove Albion	Manchester
15:00 GMT	Pogba 27' (pen.); Rashford 42' (yellow card) 90+3'	Report	Groß 72'	Stadium: Old Trafford; Attendance: 74,532; Referee: Paul Tierney

29 January 2019 24	Fulham	4–2	Brighton & Hove Albion	Fulham
19:45 GMT	Seri (yellow card) 36'; Chambers 47'; Mitrović 58', 74'; Vietto 79'; Babel (yellow card) 87'	Report	Murray 3', 17'; Stephens (yellow card) 26'; Duffy	Stadium: Craven Cottage; Attendance: 22,008; Referee: Lee Probert

2 February 2019 25	Brighton & Hove Albion	0–0	Watford	Falmer
15:00 GMT	Pröpper (yellow card) 33'	Report		Stadium: Amex Stadium; Attendance: 30,414; Referee: Simon Hooper

9 February 2019 26	Brighton & Hove Albion	1–3	Burnley	Falmer
17:30 GMT	Ryan (yellow card) 72'; Duffy 76'	Report	Wood 26', 61'; Barnes 74' (pen.); Westwood (yellow card) 76'	Stadium: Amex Stadium; Attendance: 29,323; Referee: Stuart Attwell

26 February 2019 27	Leicester City	2–1	Brighton & Hove Albion	Leicester
19:45 GMT	Gray 10'; Vardy 63' (yellow card) 84'	Report	Montoya (yellow card) 23'; Pröpper 66'	Stadium: King Power Stadium; Attendance: 30,558; Referee: Lee Probert

2 March 2019 28	Brighton & Hove Albion	1–0	Huddersfield Town	Falmer
15:00 GMT	Murray (yellow card) 45'; Andone 79', (yellow card) 80'	Report	Mooy (yellow card) 58'; Mounié (yellow card) 63'	Stadium: Amex Stadium; Attendance: 30,182; Referee: Mike Dean

9 March 2019 29	Crystal Palace	1–2	Brighton & Hove Albion	Selhurst
12:30 GMT	Milivojević 50' (pen.); Dann (yellow card) 89'	Report	Knockaert (yellow card) 1' (goal) 74'; Murray 19' (yellow card) 70'; Montoya (yellow card) 24'; Ryan (yellow card) 90+2'; Bernardo (yellow card) 90+3'	Stadium: Selhurst Park; Attendance: 24,972; Referee: Craig Pawson

30 March 2019 30	Brighton & Hove Albion	0–1	Southampton	Falmer
15:00 GMT	Stephens (yellow card) 15'	Report	Højbjerg 53'; Stephens (yellow card) 83'; Ward-Prowse (yellow card) 90'	Stadium: Amex Stadium; Attendance: 30,636; Referee: Michael Oliver

3 April 2019 31	Chelsea	3–0	Brighton & Hove Albion	London
19:45 BST	Giroud 38'; Hazard 60'; Loftus-Cheek 63'	Report		Stadium: Stamford Bridge; Attendance: 38,593; Referee: Graham Scott

13 April 2019 32	Brighton & Hove Albion	0–5	Bournemouth	Falmer
15:00 BST	Andone (yellow card) 50'; Knockaert (red card) 68'; Bissouma (yellow card) 78'	Report	Aké (yellow card) 22'; Gosling 33', (yellow card) 64'; Mepham (yellow card) 50'; Fraser 55'; Boruc (yellow card) 71'; Brooks 74'; Wilson 82'; Stanislas 90+2'	Stadium: Amex Stadium; Attendance: 30,460; Referee: Kevin Friend

16 April 2019 33	Brighton & Hove Albion	0–2	Cardiff City	Falmer
19:45 BST		Report	Mendez-Laing 22'; Morrison 50'; Bennett (yellow card) 79'	Stadium: Amex Stadium; Attendance: 30,226; Referee: Andre Marriner

20 April 2019 34	Wolverhampton Wanderers	0–0	Brighton & Hove Albion	Wolverhampton
15:00 BST		Report	Stephens (yellow card) 32'	Stadium: Molineux Stadium; Attendance: 31,096; Referee: Craig Pawson

23 April 2019 35	Tottenham Hotspur	1–0	Brighton & Hove Albion	Tottenham
19:45 BST	Eriksen (yellow card) 46', (goal) 88'	Report	Andone (yellow card) 35'; Bernardo (yellow card) 75'	Stadium: Tottenham Hotspur Stadium; Attendance: 56,251; Referee: Chris Kavanagh

27 April 2019 36	Brighton & Hove Albion	1–1	Newcastle United	Falmer
17:30 BST	Andone (yellow card) 11'; Groß 75'; Bissouma (yellow card) 78'	Report	Pérez 18'; Dummett (yellow card) 25'; Ritchie (yellow card) 45'; Muto (yellow card) 84'	Stadium: Amex Stadium; Attendance: 30,587; Referee: Mike Dean

5 May 2019 37	Arsenal	1–1	Brighton & Hove Albion	Holloway
16:30 BST	Aubameyang 9' (pen.); Papastathopoulos (yellow card) 14'; Xhaka (yellow card) 60'; Lichtsteiner (yellow card) 64'; Guendouzi (yellow card) 83'; Mustafi (yellow card) 84'	Report	Groß (yellow card) 45+2'; Murray 61' (pen.); Dunk (yellow card) 63'	Stadium: Emirates Stadium; Attendance: 59,965; Referee: Anthony Taylor

12 May 2019 38	Brighton & Hove Albion	1–4	Manchester City	Falmer
15:00 BST	Murray 27'	Report	Agüero 28'; Laporte 38'; Mahrez 63'; Gündoğan 72'	Stadium: Amex Stadium; Attendance: 30,662; Referee: Michael Oliver

=== FA Cup ===
The third round draw was made live on BBC by Ruud Gullit and Paul Ince from Stamford Bridge on 3 December 2018. The fourth round draw was made live on BBC by Robbie Keane and Carl Ikeme from Wolverhampton on 7 January 2019. The fifth round draw was broadcast on 28 January 2019 live on BBC, Alex Scott and Ian Wright conducted the draw. Draw for the quarter-final was made on 18 February by Darren Fletcher & Wayne Bridge.

5 January 2019 Third round	Bournemouth	1–3	Brighton & Hove Albion	Bournemouth
12:30 GMT	Pugh 55'; Surman (yellow card) 84'; Cook (yellow card) 90'	Report	Stephens (yellow card) 22'; Knockaert 31'; Bissouma 34'; Andone 64'	Stadium: Dean Court; Attendance: 10,522; Referee: Michael Oliver

26 January 2019 Fourth round	Brighton & Hove Albion	0–0	West Bromwich Albion	Falmer
15:00 GMT	Locadia (yellow card) 59'	Report		Stadium: Falmer Stadium; Attendance: 27,001; Referee: Lee Mason

6 February 2019 Fourth round replay	West Bromwich Albion	1–3 (a.e.t.)	Brighton & Hove Albion	West Bromwich
19:45 GMT	Bartley 77'	Report	Bissouma (yellow card) 81'; Andone 82'; Murray 104', 117'	Stadium: The Hawthorns; Attendance: 8,645; Referee: Paul Tierney

16 February 2019 Fifth round	Brighton & Hove Albion	2–1	Derby County	Falmer
12:30 GMT	Knockaert 33'; Locadia 45+2'; Bissouma (yellow card) 76'; Jahanbakhsh (yellow card) 90+4'	Report	Tomori (yellow card) 20'; Wilson (yellow card) 28'; Malone (yellow card) 35'; Cole 81'	Stadium: Falmer Stadium; Attendance: 24,562; Referee: David Coote

17 March 2019 Quarter-finals	Millwall	2–2 (4–5 p)	Brighton & Hove Albion	Bermondsey
14:00 GMT	Pearce 70'; O'Brien 79'; Ferguson (red card) 119'	Report	Bernardo (yellow card) 35'; Montoya (yellow card) 69'; Locadia 88'; March 90+5'	Stadium: The Den; Attendance: 17,137; Referee: Chris Kavanagh
	Penalties
	Williams (penalty scored); Tunnicliffe (penalty scored); Leonard (penalty scored); Romeo (penalty missed); Morison (penalty scored); Cooper (penalty missed)		Murray (penalty missed); Locadia (penalty scored); March (penalty scored); Pröpper (penalty scored); Stephens (penalty scored); Dunk (penalty scored)

6 April 2019 Semi-finals	Manchester City	1–0	Brighton & Hove Albion	London
17:30 BST	Jesus 4'; Walker (yellow card) 32'; Danilo (yellow card) 50'	Report	Jahanbakhsh (yellow card) 32'; Dunk (yellow card) 72'	Stadium: Wembley Stadium; Attendance: 71,521; Referee: Anthony Taylor

=== EFL Cup ===
The second round draw was made from the Stadium of Light on 16 August.

28 August 2018 Second round	Brighton & Hove Albion	0–1	Southampton	Falmer
19:45 BST		Report	Austin 88'	Stadium: Falmer Stadium; Attendance: 13,651; Referee: Andre Marriner

== Squad statistics ==
As of end of 2018–2019 season

No.	Pos	Nat	Player	Total		Premier League		EFL Cup		FA Cup	
No.	Pos	Nat	Player	Apps	Goals	Apps	Goals	Apps	Goals	Apps	Goals
Goalkeepers
1	GK	(Australia) AUS	Mathew Ryan	36	0	34	0	0	0	2	0
23	GK	(England) ENG	Jason Steele	1	0	0	0	0	0	1	0
27	GK	(England) ENG	David Button	8	0	4	0	1	0	3	0
Defenders
2	DF	(Spain) ESP	Bruno	18	0	14	0	0	0	4	0
3	DF	(Cameroon) CMR	Gaëtan Bong	24	0	19+3	0	0	0	1+1	0
4	DF	(Republic of Ireland) IRL	Shane Duffy	40	5	35	5	0	0	5	0
5	DF	(England) ENG	Lewis Dunk	38	2	36	2	0	0	2	0
14	DF	(Nigeria) NGA	Leon Balogun	10	1	5+3	1	0	0	2	0
22	DF	(Spain) ESP	Martín Montoya	29	0	24+1	0	0	0	3+1	0
30	DF	(Brazil) BRA	Bernardo	27	0	19+3	0	1	0	4	0
33	DF	(England) ENG	Dan Burn	3	0	0	0	0	0	3	0
Midfielders
6	MF	(England) ENG	Dale Stephens	35	1	29+1	1	0	0	5	0
7	MF	(Israel) ISR	Beram Kayal	24	1	9+9	1	1	0	5	0
8	MF	(Mali) MLI	Yves Bissouma	34	1	17+11	0	1	0	5	1
11	MF	(France) FRA	Anthony Knockaert	36	4	18+12	2	0	0	6	2
13	MF	(Germany) GER	Pascal Groß	27	3	24+1	3	1	0	0+1	0
20	MF	(England) ENG	Solly March	37	2	31+4	1	0	0	0+2	1
24	MF	(Netherlands) NED	Davy Pröpper	35	1	30	1	0+1	0	2+2	0
58	MF	(England) ENG	Will Collar	1	0	0	0	1	0	0	0
Forwards
9	FW	(Netherlands) NED	Jürgen Locadia	33	4	12+14	2	1	0	3+3	2
10	FW	(Romania) ROU	Florin Andone	27	5	8+15	3	0	0	3+1	2
16	FW	(Iran) IRN	Alireza Jahanbakhsh	24	0	12+7	0	1	0	4	0
17	FW	(England) ENG	Glenn Murray	42	15	30+8	13	0	0	2+2	2
19	FW	(Colombia) COL	Jose Izquierdo	10	0	2+6	0	0	0	0+2	0
42	FW	(Sweden) SWE	Viktor Gyökeres	5	0	0	0	1	0	1+3	0
Players who have made an appearance or had a squad number this season but have left the club (All gone out on loan)
21	DF	(Italy) ITA	Ezequiel Schelotto	0	0	0	0	0	0	0	0
29	DF	(Austria) AUT	Markus Suttner	1	0	0	0	1	0	0	0
44	FW	(Republic of Ireland) IRL	Aaron Connolly	1	0	0	0	0+1	0	0	0
35	DF	(England) ENG	Ben Barclay	1	0	0	0	1	0	0	0
