= Rubén Botta =

Argentine footballer (born 1990)

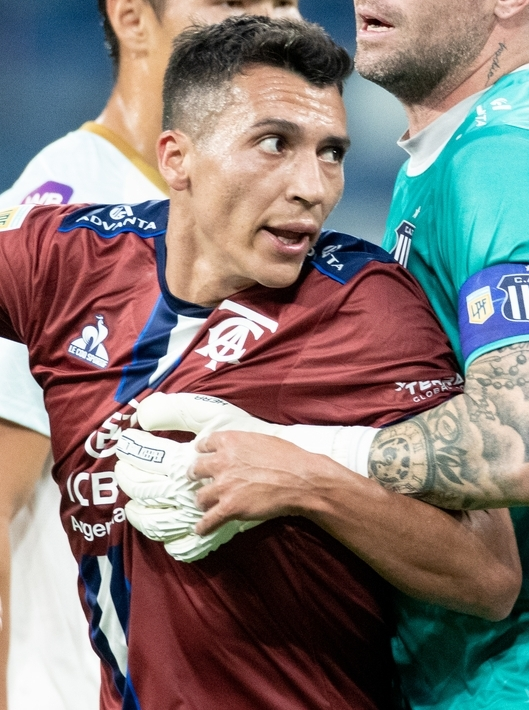

Personal information
- Full name: Rubén Alejandro Botta Montero
- Date of birth: 31 January 1990 (age 36)
- Place of birth: San Juan, Argentina
- Height: 1.75 m (5 ft 9 in)
- Position: Attacking midfielder

Team information
- Current team: Nacional
- Number: 20

Youth career
- 1996–2007: Boca Juniors
- 2008–2009: Tigre

Senior career*
Years	Team	Apps	(Gls)
2009–2013	Tigre	61	(5)
2013–2015	Inter Milan	10	(0)
2014–2015	→ Chievo (loan)	21	(0)
2015–2017	Pachuca	43	(8)
2017–2020	San Lorenzo	56	(5)
2020	Defensa y Justicia	7	(1)
2020–2021	Sambenedettese	30	(8)
2021–2023	Bari	50	(6)
2023–2024	Colón	15	(3)
2024–2026	Talleres	57	(4)
2026	Defensa y Justicia	13	(1)
2026–	Nacional	5	(1)
- * Club domestic league appearances and goals as of 16:44, 4 October 2026 (UTC)

Rubén Alejandro Botta Montero (born 31 January 1990) is an Argentine footballer who plays as an attacking midfielder for Nacional.

== Career ==
Rubén Botta made his league debut for Tigre in a 0–0 draw with Boca Juniors on 23 March 2009, at the age of 19. He only played one further game in the 2009 Clausura before being loaned for half a season Latvian Higher League side FK Ventspils, where he did not play in any games. In 2010, he returned to Tigre and begun to make more regular appearances for the club. On 13 November, he came to widespread attention in a 2–1 win against league leaders Estudiantes de la Plata, in which he assisted for Tigre's second goal and nearly scored a third after a display of individual skill.

In April 2013, he signed for Serie A club Internazionale, despite he would join A.S. Livorno Calcio first. Botta failed to obtain Italian citizenship, thus Inter bought the non-EU registration quota from Livorno . In January 2014 Botta formally became a player of Inter. On 7 July 2015 Botta agreed to join Mexican side C.F. Pachuca.

In January 2024, Botta joined Talleres.

== Style of play ==
Botta primarily plays as an attacking midfielder. He is left-footed.

== Career statistics ==
=== Club ===
As of 15 January 2024

Appearances and goals by club, season and competition
Club	Season	League			National Cup		League Cup		Continental		Other		Total	
Club	Season	Division	Apps	Goals	Apps	Goals	Apps	Goals	Apps	Goals	Apps	Goals	Apps	Goals
Tigre	2008–09	Primera División	2	0	—		—		—		—		2	0
Tigre	2009–10	Primera División	9	0	—		—		—		—		9	0
Tigre	2010–11	Primera División	23	0	—		—		—		—		23	0
Tigre	2011–12	Primera División	7	0	—		—		8 (Note: Appearance(s) in Copa Sudamericana)	2	—		15	2
Tigre	2012–13	Primera División	20	5	—		—		9 (Note: Appearance(s) in Copa Libertadores)	4	—		29	9
Tigre	Total		61	5	0	0	0	0	17	6	0	0	78	11
Inter Milan	2013–14	Serie A	10	0	1	0	—		1 (Note: Appearance(s) in UEFA Europa League)	0	—		12	0
Chievo (loan)	2014–15	Serie A	21	0	0	0	—		—		—		21	0
Pachuca	2015–16	Liga MX	31	4	4	0	—		0	0	2 (Note: One appearance in Liguilla Clausura, One appearance in Campeón de Campeones)	0	37	4
Pachuca	2016–17	Liga MX	12	4	0	0	—		1 (Note: Appearance(s) in CONCACAF Champions League)	2	2 (Note: Appearance(s) in Liguilla Apertura)	0	15	6
Pachuca	Total		43	8	4	0	0	0	1	2	4	0	52	10
San Lorenzo	2017	Primera División	16	0	—		—		8	1	—		24	1
San Lorenzo	2018	Primera División	21	3	—		—		5	0	—		26	3
San Lorenzo	2019	Primera División	18	2	—		3	0	1	0	—		22	2
San Lorenzo	2020	Primera División	1	0	—		—		—		—		1	0
San Lorenzo	Total		56	5	0	0	3	0	14	1	0	0	73	6
Defensa y Justicia	2020	Primera División	7	1	—		—		2	0	—		9	1
Sambenedettese	2020–21	Serie C	30	8	—		—		—		1	0	31	8
Bari	2021–22	Serie C	25	4	1	0	—		—		1	0	27	4
Bari	2022–23	Serie B	27	2	3	1	—		—		—		30	3
Bari	Total		52	6	4	1	0	0	0	0	1	0	57	7
Colón	2023	Primera División	15	3	2	0	—		—		—		17	3
Talleres	2024	Primera División	13	2	0	0	—		2 (Note: Appearance(s) in Copa Libertadores)	1	—		15	3
Career total			308	38	11	1	3	0	37	10	6	0	365	49

== Honours ==
Pachuca

- Liga MX: Clausura 2016

Bari

- Serie C: 2021–22 (Group C)
