= Ezequiel Schelotto =

Argentine-Italian footballer (born 1989)

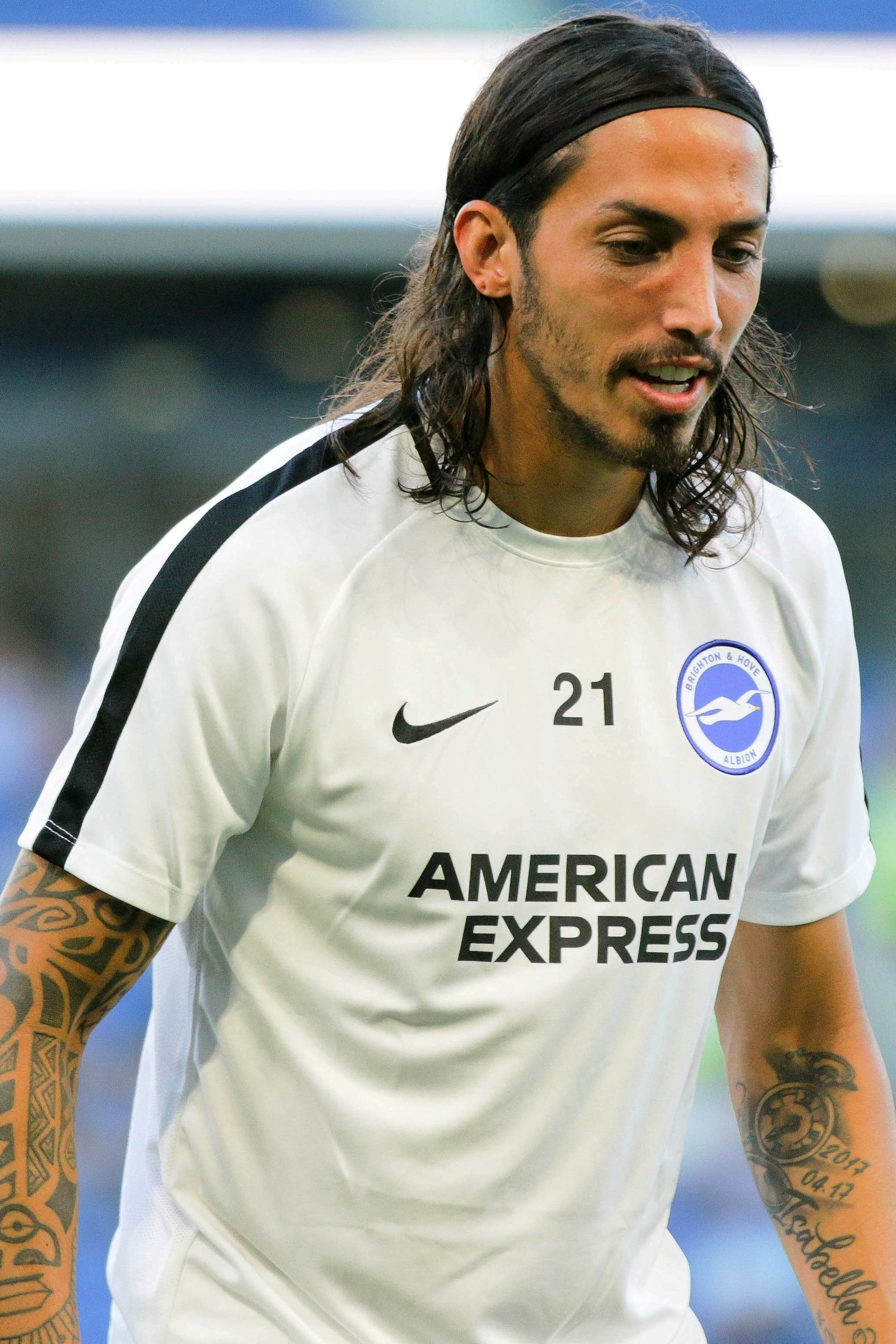
- Schelotto with Brighton in 2018

Personal information
- Full name: Ezequiel Matías Schelotto
- Date of birth: 23 May 1989 (age 37)
- Place of birth: Buenos Aires, Argentina
- Height: 1.88 m (6 ft 2 in)
- Positions: Right-back; right midfielder

Team information
- Current team: Paradiso
- Number: 2

Youth career
- 1995–2003: Vélez Sársfield
- 2003–2008: Banfield

Senior career*
Years	Team	Apps	(Gls)
2008–2009	Cesena	6	(1)
2009–2013	Atalanta	53	(2)
2009–2011	→ Cesena (loan)	57	(6)
2011	→ Catania (loan)	14	(1)
2013–2015	Inter Milan	12	(1)
2013–2014	→ Sassuolo (loan)	11	(1)
2014	→ Parma (loan)	16	(4)
2014–2015	→ Chievo (loan)	29	(0)
2015–2017	Sporting CP	37	(0)
2017–2020	Brighton & Hove Albion	28	(0)
2019	→ Chievo (loan)	4	(0)
2021–2022	Racing Club	5	(0)
2022–2023	Aldosivi	3	(0)
2023	Deportivo Morón	9	(1)
2023–2024	Barletta	16	(3)
2024–	Paradiso	58	(8)
2025–2026	→ Dubai City (loan)	3	(1)

International career
2009–2010	Italy U21	7	(0)
2012	Italy	1	(0)
- * Club domestic league appearances and goals as of 1 October 2026

Ezequiel Matías Schelotto (Spanish pronunciation: [eseˈkjel maˈti.as eskeˈloto], Italian: [skeˈlɔtto]; born 23 May 1989) is an Argentine-Italian footballer who plays for Paradiso in the Swiss Promotion League. A versatile player on the right flank, he started his career as a winger and was later converted into a full-back.

Born in Argentina of Italian descent, Schelotto moved to Italy in 2008 to play for Cesena. He chose to represent Italy at international level, earning a full cap for the national side in 2012 while an Atalanta player. In 2013, he joined Inter Milan and spent the next two years on loan at several Serie A sides before making a move to Sporting CP in Portugal and then to Brighton & Hove Albion in England. Following a brief loan spell at Chievo in 2019, he was released from his contract with Brighton, after which he agreed to return to Argentina with Racing in early 2021. Despite his contract only running out in December 2023, Racing Club allowed Schelotto to leave on a free transfer to Aldosivi in the summer of 2022.

He is nicknamed El Galgo ("The Greyhound" in Spanish) due to his running skills and, less frequently, El Mosquetero ("The Musketeer").

== Club career ==
=== Banfield ===
Schelotto began his football adventure in his native country, Argentina, in the minor divisions of Banfield. But he did not debut in the first team as he emigrated to European football.

=== Cesena ===
Schelotto joined Lega Pro Prima Divisione side Cesena in July 2008. Then, in April 2009, his transfer was finally cleared by FIFA. During that season, following his approved transfer, Schelotto played six matches out of a possible seven for Cesena, scoring one goal and helping Cesena to achieve promotion back up to the second tier Serie B.

=== Atalanta ===
==== Cesena (loan) ====
In June 2009, Schelotto was signed by Serie A side Atalanta on a co-ownership deal for €250,000 and, in July 2009, he was instantly loaned back to his previous club, Cesena. During the 2009–10 Serie B campaign, Schelotto made 40 league appearances, scoring six goals. Of his 40 matches, 33 of them were from the starting XI. He earned just €82,750 in the 2009–10 season.

On 24 June 2010, Schelotto was signed outright by Atalanta for an additional €2.5 million fee, which were just relegated to the Serie B following an 18th-place finish during the 2009–10 Serie A, whilst Cesena earned their second consecutive promotion as the club earned promotion to the top flight following a top three Serie B finish. Following his purchase, the player was again loaned back to the Emilia-Romagna-based club, along with veteran midfielder Fabio Caserta and central defender Maximiliano Pellegrino. Schelotto wage was also increased significantly. As he left the club in January 2011, he earned €268,333.31 from Cesena for the first seven months of the 2010–11 season.

Schelotto had a bitter Serie A season with Cesena, one in which the team started brightly, even topping the league table by round three, but then endured a landslide that saw the team drop to 18th place and into the relegation places by November. He lost his starting place on 24 October as the coach used Luis Jiménez as a new supportive striker in the three-forward formation. Since then, he only made four starts to replace Giuseppe Colucci (who was injured) and Stephen Appiah (twice), respectively, as one of the midfielders. His last start – and last match – with Cesena was on 23 January 2011, a match where Cesena fielded an inferior squad against Milan where the three forwards, Schelotto, Igor Budan, and Dominique Malonga, were not regular starters.

During the first half of the 2010–11 campaign, Schelotto made 17 league appearances with one goal. On 31 January 2011, he was transferred to Serie A side Catania on loan.

==== Catania (loan) ====
On 31 January 2011, Schelotto transferred to Catania in Sicily on loan from Atalanta. In his transfer deal, Catania also received the option to sign the player on a co-ownership basis by the end of the ongoing season. Schelotto started his first match for the Sicilians on 6 February 2011, a match that Catania lost 1–0 away to Bologna, in part due to an early red card to defender Pablo Álvarez.

==== Return to Atalanta ====
Schelotto returned to Atalanta on 1 July 2011. He was included in the first team squad of Atalanta for 2011–12 Serie A campaign, which the club was promoted back to the top tier as the champions of Serie B in May 2011. During his 1 1/2 seasons with the Serie A club, he earned a transfer to Inter Milan for €6 million transfer fee in January 2013, despite in a cash-plus-player deal.

=== Internazionale ===
Schelotto joined Italian giants Inter Milan on 31 January 2013 for €3.5 million cash plus 50% "card" of Marko Livaja (Inter valued 50% rights of Livaja for €2.5 million but bought the rights back from Cesena for €1.5 million cash). Schelotto made his debut on 3 February in a 3–1 loss against Siena, playing the first 45 minutes before giving way to Mateo Kovačić. He scored his only goal for the club in the 1–1 draw against city rivals Milan on 24 February 2013.

Successively, Schelotto spent two seasons on loan to other Italian clubs, and on 31 August 2015, it was agreed between the two parties Schelotto would terminate his contract by mutual consent.

==== Sassuolo (loan) ====
On 29 August 2013, Schelotto signed on loan with Serie A side Sassuolo. On 29 September he scored his first league goal for Sassuolo in a 2–2 draw with Lazio.

==== Parma (loan) ====
On 22 January 2014, Schelotto joined Parma along with his Sassuolo compatriot, Jonathan Rossini, signing on a loan deal.

==== Chievo (loan) ====
On 25 August 2014, Schelotto joined Chievo on loan for the 2014–15 season.

=== Sporting CP ===
On 20 November 2015, Schelotto joined the Portuguese side Sporting CP on a three-and-a-half-year contract after being released by Internazionale in the summer of that year.

=== Brighton & Hove Albion ===
==== 2017–18 ====
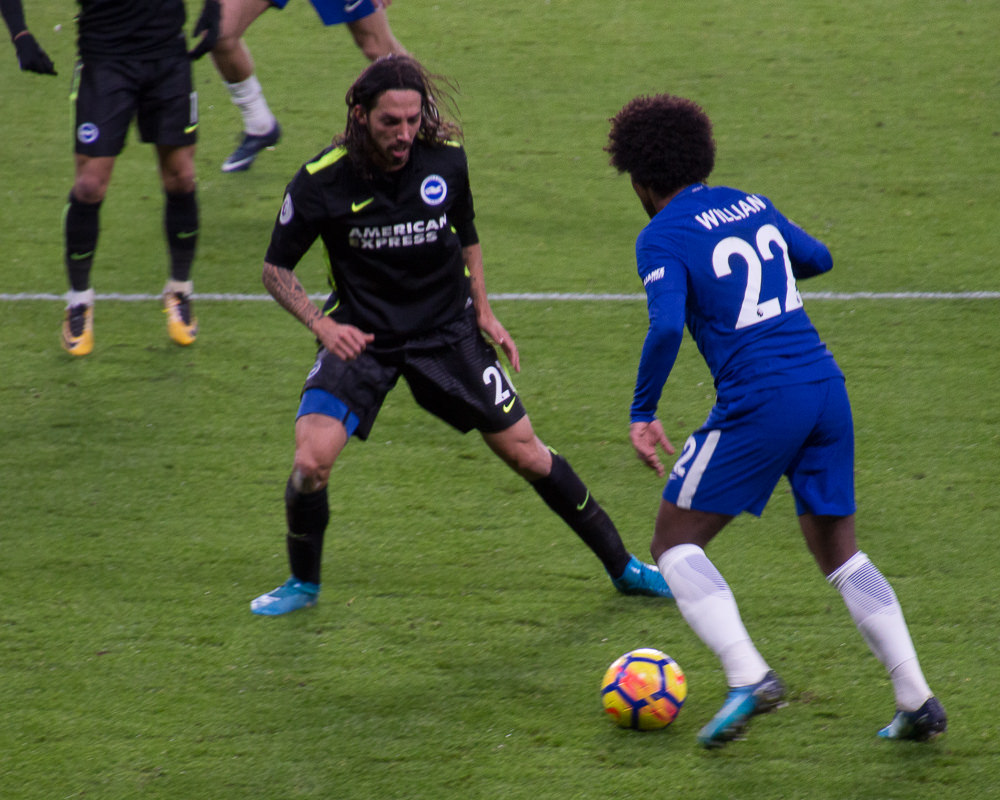
Schelotto playing for Brighton & Hove Albion.

On 31 August 2017, Schelotto completed a transfer to Premier League club Brighton & Hove Albion, signing a three-year contract at the south coast club. Schelotto made his Albion debut on 1 October 2017 coming on as a substitute in the 2–0 away defeat to Arsenal in the league. In his next game for the Sussex club he came on again as a substitute, this time away to West Ham United where Brighton won 3–0. Schelotto made his home debut on 20 November coming on as a sub in a 2–2 draw against Stoke City. Schelotto made his first start for Brighton in an away match in the league against Tottenham Hotspur where they lost 2–0 on 13 December.

==== 2018–19: Loan to Chievo ====
After not making any appearances for Brighton in the first half of the 2018–19 season, Schelotto signed on loan to Chievo – for the second time in his career – for the rest of the season on 28 January 2019. His first appearance of this loan spell came as a 72nd-minute substitute on 8 February in a 3–0 home loss against Roma. He made four appearances for the Veronese side where they were relegated from Serie A for the first time in 12 years.

==== 2019–20: Back to Brighton ====
On 26 October 2019, after almost 18 months without making an appearance for Brighton, Schelotto came on as a substitute in a home tie against Everton in which Brighton won 3–2. He came on again as a sub a week later in Brighton's next match at home to Norwich in a 2–0 victory. After making nine appearances in all competitions at the end of the 2019–20 season Schelotto was released by Brighton, having made a total of 32 appearances across his spell at the Sussex club.

=== Racing Club ===
On 4 February 2021, Schelotto returned to Argentina and joined Racing Club on a two-and-a-half-year deal.

=== Aldosivi ===
On 2 August 2022, Schelotto joined Aldosivi on a free transfer from Racing Club on a one-and-a-half-year deal that runs until December 2023. His contract with Racing Club was initially due to expire only in December 2023; however, a mutual agreement was reached between all three parties - Racing Club, Aldosivi, and Schelotto, for the termination of his contract with Racing Club to allow him to join Aldosivi more than a year before the expiration of his contract.

=== Deportivo Morón ===
On 17 February 2023, Schelotto joined Deportivo Morón on a one-year deal after terminating his contract with Aldosivi.

=== Barletta ===
In July 2023, Schelotto agreed to return to Italy, signing for Serie D club Barletta.

== International career ==
As a dual citizen of Argentina and Italy (the latter due to his ancestry), Schelotto was eligible to play internationally for both countries. In November 2009, he was called up to the Italian national under-21 team, and was immediately featured in the starting lineup in a game against Hungary on 13 November.

Since making his debut, he played all available 2011 UEFA European Under-21 Football Championship qualification matches, and unusually as right back in the last qualification match against Wales in September. In that match, Italy beat Wales 1–0 and narrowly topped Wales as the group winner. He assisted Stefano Okaka to score the second goal in the first leg of the playoff round against Belarus but missed the second leg due to suspension. Italy were eventually eliminated due to a 0–3 loss against Belarus in Borisov.

On 10 August 2012, he was called up by Cesare Prandelli to the Italian senior team for a friendly against England, where he made his debut in the 2–1 defeat.

== Personal life ==
Born in Buenos Aires, Schelotto also holds an Italian passport due to his Italian descent from Cogoleto (GE), in Liguria, where his great-great-grandfather Giovanni Battista Francesco Schelotto emigrated from in the late 19th century. He is the fifth of seven children – including five males – two of whom are also footballers.

== Career statistics ==
=== Club ===
As of end of 2019–20 season

Appearances and goals by club, season and competition
Club	Season	League			National cup		League cup		Other		Total	
Club	Season	Division	Apps	Goals	Apps	Goals	Apps	Goals	Apps	Goals	Apps	Goals
Cesena	2008–09	Lega Pro Prima Divisione	6	1	0	0	—		2 (Note: Appearances in Supercoppa di Lega di Prima Divisione)	0	8	1
Cesena	2009–10	Serie B	40	6	2	0	—		—		42	6
Cesena	2010–11	Serie A	17	0	1	1	—		—		18	1
Cesena	Total		63	7	3	1	—		2	0	68	8
Catania (loan)	2010–11	Serie A	14	1	0	0	—		—		14	1
Atalanta	2011–12	Serie A	37	2	1	0	—		—		38	2
Atalanta	2012–13	Serie A	16	0	2	0	—		—		18	0
Atalanta	Total		53	2	3	0	—		—		56	2
Inter Milan	2012–13	Serie A	12	1	1	0	—		0	0	13	1
Sassuolo (loan)	2013–14	Serie A	11	1	1	0	—		—		12	1
Parma (loan)	2013–14	Serie A	16	4	0	0	—		—		16	4
Chievo (loan)	2014–15	Serie A	29	0	0	0	—		—		29	0
Sporting CP	2015–16	Primeira Liga	14	0	0	0	3	0	0	0	17	0
Sporting CP	2016–17	Primeira Liga	23	0	0	0	0	0	3 (Note: Appearances in UEFA Champions League)	0	26	0
Sporting CP	Total		37	0	0	0	3	0	3	0	43	0
Brighton & Hove Albion	2017–18	Premier League	20	0	2	0	1	0	—		23	0
Brighton & Hove Albion	2018–19	Premier League	0	0	0	0	0	0	—		0	0
Brighton & Hove Albion	2019–20	Premier League	8	0	1	0	0	0	—		9	0
Brighton & Hove Albion	Total		28	0	3	0	1	0	0	0	32	0
Chievo (loan)	2018–19	Serie A	4	0	0	0	—		—		4	0
Career total			267	16	11	1	4	0	5	0	287	17

=== International ===
As of match played on 15 August 2012

Italy national team
Year	Apps	Goals
2012	1	0
Total	1	0

== Honours ==
Cesena

- Lega Pro Prima Divisione: 2008–09
- Serie B runner up: 2009–10
