= 2014–15 AC ChievoVerona season =

Chievo
2014–15 season
- President: Luca Campedelli
- Manager: Eugenio Corini (until 19 October 2014); Rolando Maran (from 19 October 2014)
- Stadium: Stadio Marc'Antonio Bentegodi
- Serie A: 14th
- Coppa Italia: Third round
- Top goalscorer: League: Alberto Paloschi (9); All: Alberto Paloschi (9)
- Highest home attendance: 26,000 vs Juventus (30 August 2014, Serie A)
- Lowest home attendance: 5,000 vs Cesena (9 November 2014, Serie A)
- Average home league attendance: 11,317
Home colours	Away colours	Third colours

The 2014–15 A.C. ChievoVerona season was the club's eighth consecutive season in Serie A. The team competed in Serie A, finishing 14th, and in the Coppa Italia, where Chievo was eliminated in the third round by Pescara.

== Players ==
=== Squad information ===
In italics players who left the club during the season. Note: Flags indicate national team as defined under FIFA eligibility rules; some limited exceptions apply. Players may hold more than one non-FIFA nationality.

No.	Pos.	Nation	Player
1	GK	ARG	Albano Bizzarri
3	DF	ITA	Dario Dainelli
6	MF	POL	Tomasz Kupisz
7	MF	SVN	Dejan Lazarević
7	DF	ITA	Federico Mattiello (on loan from Juventus)
8	MF	SRB	Ivan Radovanović
9	MF	ITA	Simone Bentivoglio
10	FW	ARG	Maxi López
11	MF	ITA	Roberto Guana
12	DF	SVN	Boštjan Cesar
13	MF	ARG	Mariano Izco
14	MF	GHA	Isaac Cofie
17	GK	ITA	Christian Puggioni
18	MF	GRE	Giannis Fetfatzidis (on loan from Genoa)
19	FW	ARG	Rubén Botta (on loan from Internazionale)

No.	Pos.	Nation	Player
20	DF	ITA	Gennaro Sardo
21	DF	FRA	Nicolas Frey
25	GK	ITA	Francesco Bardi
26	DF	BRA	Edimar Fraga
31	FW	ITA	Sergio Pellissier (captain)
34	DF	ITA	Cristiano Biraghi
43	FW	ITA	Alberto Paloschi
55	DF	ITA	Alessandro Gamberini
56	MF	FIN	Përparim Hetemaj
63	MF	ITA	Nicola Bellomo
69	FW	ITA	Riccardo Meggiorini
84	MF	FRA	Thomas Mangani
86	MF	SVN	Valter Birsa
87	DF	BIH	Ervin Zukanović
90	GK	ITA	Andrea Seculin

== Transfers ==
=== In ===
Date	Pos.	Player	Age	Moving from	Fee	Source
20 June 2014	DF	(Bosnia and Herzegovina) Ervin Zukanović	27	(Belgium) Gent	Loan	
28 June 2014	DF	(Brazil) Edimar Fraga	28	(Romania) CFR Cluj	Free	
30 June 2014	FW	(Argentina) Maxi López	30	(Italy) Catania	€2,500,000	
2 July 2014	FW	(Italy) Riccardo Meggiorini	28	(Italy) Torino	Free	
5 July 2014	GK	(Italy) Francesco Bardi	22	(Italy) Internazionale	Loan	
6 July 2014	DF	(Italy) Cristiano Biraghi	21	(Italy) Internazionale	2-year loan	
6 July 2014	MF	(France) Thomas Mangani	27	(France) Nancy	Free	
9 July 2014	MF	(Slovenia) Valter Birsa	28	(Italy) Milan	Loan	
24 July 2014	DF	(Italy) Alessandro Gamberini	32	(Italy) Napoli	€1,000,000	
31 July 2014	MF	(Argentina) Mariano Izco	30	(Italy) Catania	€2,600,000	
26 August 2014	MF	(Argentina) Rubén Botta	24	(Italy) Internazionale	Loan	
26 August 2014	MF	(Italy) Ezequiel Schelotto	25	(Italy) Internazionale	Loan	
28 August 2014	GK	(Argentina) Albano Bizzarri	36	(Italy) Genoa	€100,000	
28 August 2014	MF	(Ghana) Isaac Cofie	23	(Italy) Genoa	Loan	
15 January 2015	MF	(Denmark) Anders Christiansen	24	(Denmark) Nordsjælland	€900,000	
31 January 2015	MF	(Greece) Giannis Fetfatzidis	24	(Italy) Genoa	Loan	
2 February 2015	DF	(Italy) Federico Mattiello	19	(Italy) Juventus	Loan	
2 February 2015	MF	(Albania) Armando Vajushi	23	(Bulgaria) Litex Lovech	Loan	
2 February 2015	FW	(Italy) Nicola Pozzi	28	(Italy) Parma	Loan	
2 February 2015	DF	(England) Myles Anderson	25	(Italy) Monza	€50,000	

=== Out ===
Date	Pos.	Player	Age	Moving to	Fee	Source
22 May 2014	GK	(Italy) Michael Agazzi	29	(Italy) Milan	Free	
18 June 2014	DF	(Senegal) Boukary Dramé	28	(Italy) Atalanta	Free	
24 June 2014	FW	(France) Cyril Théréau	31	(Italy) Udinese	€2,000,000	
16 July 2014	FW	(Brazil) Victor da Silva	19	(Italy) Pescara	Loan	
18 July 2014	MF	(Romania) Adrian Stoian	23	(Italy) Bari	Loan	
24 July 2014	MF	(Czech Republic) Kamil Vacek	27	(Czech Republic) Sparta Prague	€750,000	
25 July 2014	MF	(Italy) Luca Rigoni	29	(Italy) Palermo	€4,500,000	
25 July 2014	DF	(Italy) Raffaele Pucino	23	(Italy) Pescara	Loan	
29 July 2014	DF	(Brazil) Claiton	29	(Italy) Crotone	Free	
6 August 2014	MF	(Albania) Isnik Alimi	20	(Italy) Lumezzane	Loan	
6 August 2014	MF	(Argentina) Adrián Calello	27	(Italy) Catania	€500,000	
14 August 2014	MF	(Senegal) Maodo Malick Mbaye	26	(Italy) Carpi	Loan	
1 September 2014	MF	(Italy) Simone Bentivoglio	29	(Italy) Brescia	Loan	
1 September 2014	MF	(Italy) Roberto Guana	33	(Italy) Pescara	Free	
7 January 2015	DF	(Brazil) Edimar Fraga	28	(Spain) Córdoba	Loan	
7 January 2015	MF	(Poland) Tomasz Kupisz	25	(Italy) Cittadella	Loan	
13 January 2015	FW	(Argentina) Maxi López	30	(Italy) Torino	€1,800,000	
28 January 2015	MF	(Montenegro) Idriz Toskić	19	(Italy) Monza	Loan	
29 January 2015	MF	(Italy) Nicola Bellomo	23	(Italy) Bari	Loan	
2 February 2015	DF	(France) Thomas Mangani	27	(France) Angers	Loan	
2 February 2015	MF	(Slovenia) Dejan Lazarević	24	(Italy) Sassuolo	Loan	

== Pre-season and friendlies ==
23 July 2014 Friendly	Chievo (Italy)	3–0	(England) Coventry City	San Zeno di Montagna, Italy
	Biraghi 2'; Kupisz 15'; Pellissier 33'	Report		Stadium: Campo sportivo Referee: Daniel Amabile

1 August 2014 Friendly	Borussia Dortmund (Germany)	1–0	(Italy) Chievo	Altach, Austria
	Aubameyang 72'	Report		Stadium: Stadion Schnabelholz; Attendance: 7,156; Referee: Robert Schörgenhofer

2 August 2014 Friendly	Chievo (Italy)	1–3	(France) Marseille	Le Pontet, France
	Bentivoglio 64'	Report	Thauvin 16'; N'Koulou 49'; Gignac 73'	Stadium: Stade de Montbord; Referee: Tony Chapron

6 August 2014 Friendly	Chievo (Italy)	3–0	(Italy) Castellana	Bardolino, Italy
	Lazarevic 66'; Paloschi 85'; Finazzi 90'	Report		Stadium: Campo Sportivo di Veronello

6 August 2014 Friendly	Chievo (Italy)	3–0	(Italy) Real Vicenza	Bardolino, Italy
	Bellomo 5'; Pellissier 42'; Cesar 61'	Report		Stadium: Campo Sportivo di Veronello; Referee: Fabrizio Ciamarone

9 August 2014 Ghirlandina Cup	Modena (Italy)	2–0	(Italy) Chievo	Modena, Italy
	Beltrame 47'; Gatto 77'	Report		Stadium: Stadio Alberto Braglia; Attendance: 2,000; Referee: Luca Banti

13 August 2014 Friendly	Chievo (Italy)	2–1	(United Arab Emirates) Al Ahli	Bardolino, Italy
	Hassan 10' (o.g.); Radovanović 40'	Report	Ferreira 29'	Stadium: Campo Sportivo di Veronello; Referee: Daniele Chiffi

== Competitions ==
=== Serie A ===
==== League table ====
Pos	Team	Pld	W	D	L	GF	GA	GD	Pts
12	Sassuolo	38	12	13	13	49	57	−8	49 (Note: Palermo finished ahead of Sassuolo on head-to-head away goals scored: Palermo 2-1 Sassuolo, Sassuolo 0-0 Palermo.)
13	Hellas Verona	38	11	13	14	49	65	−16	46
14	Chievo	38	10	13	15	28	41	−13	43
15	Empoli	38	8	18	12	46	52	−6	42
16	Udinese	38	10	11	17	43	56	−13	41

Source: 2014–15 Serie A, 2014-15 Serie A classification.
Rules for classification: 1) points; 2) head-to-head points; 3) head-to-head goal difference; 4) goal difference; 5) number of goals scored; 6) draw. (Head-to-head record is applied for clubs with the same number of points only once all matches between said clubs have been played.).

==== Results summary ====
Overall								Home						Away					
Pld	W	D	L	GF	GA	GD	Pts	W	D	L	GF	GA	GD	W	D	L	GF	GA	GD
38	10	13	15	28	41	−13	43	4	9	6	16	19	−3	6	4	9	12	22	−10

Last updated: 31 May 2015.
Source: Competitive matches

==== Results by round ====
Round	1	2	3	4	5	6	7	8	9	10	11	12	13	14	15	16	17	18	19	20	21	22	23	24	25	26	27	28	29	30	31	32	33	34	35	36	37	38
Ground	H	A	H	A	H	A	A	H	A	H	H	A	H	A	H	A	H	A	H	A	H	A	H	A	H	H	A	H	A	A	H	A	H	A	H	A	H	A
Result	L	W	L	L	D	L	L	L	L	D	W	D	D	W	L	W	D	D	L	L	L	W	W	L	D	D	W	W	L	W	D	D	W	D	D	L	D	L
Position	11	11	19	19	19	19	19	19	19	20	18	18	18	16	17	16	16	16	17	18	18	17	15	16	16	16	16	15	16	13	13	13	12	13	12	14	14	14

Updated to match(es) played on 31 May 2015. Source: Competitive matches
A = Away; H = Home; W = Win; D = Draw; L = Loss

==== Matches ====
30 August 2014 1	Chievo	0–1	Juventus	Verona
18:00 CEST (UTC+02:00)	Mangani (yellow card) 30'; Dainelli (yellow card) 57'	Report	Biraghi 6' (o.g.); Vidal (yellow card) 29'	Stadium: Stadio Marc'Antonio Bentegodi; Attendance: 26,000; Referee: Carmine Russo

14 September 2014 2	Napoli	0–1	Chievo	Naples
15:00 CEST (UTC+02:00)	Maggio (yellow card) 16'; Inler (yellow card) 90'	Report	Cesar (yellow card) 26'; Dainelli (yellow card) 33'; López 49'	Stadium: Stadio San Paolo; Attendance: 35,251; Referee: Piero Giacomelli

21 September 2014 3	Chievo	2–3	Parma	Verona
12:30 CEST (UTC+02:00)	Izco 4'; Paloschi 82'; Frey (yellow card) 90'	Report	Lucarelli (yellow card) 32'; Belfodil (yellow card) 63'; Cassano 65', 77'; Gobbi (yellow card) 71'; Coda 75'; Galloppa (yellow card) 90+3'	Stadium: Stadio Marc'Antonio Bentegodi; Attendance: 10,000; Referee: Antonio Damato

24 September 2014 4	Sampdoria	2–1	Chievo	Genoa
20:45 CEST (UTC+02:00)	Rizzo (yellow card) 3'; Gastaldello 45'; Romagnoli 80'	Report	Radovanović (yellow card) 38'; Zukanović (yellow card) 69'; Hetemaj (yellow card) 86'; Paloschi 89'	Stadium: Stadio Luigi Ferraris; Attendance: 19,346; Referee: Michael Fabbri

28 September 2014 5	Chievo	1–1	Empoli	Verona
15:00 CEST (UTC+02:00)	Radovanović (yellow card) 45+1'; Meggiorini 50'; Hetemaj (yellow card) 86'; Biraghi (yellow card) 90+1'	Report	Pucciarelli 59'; Hysaj (yellow card) 74'	Stadium: Stadio Marc'Antonio Bentegodi; Attendance: 6,000; Referee: Davide Massa

4 October 2014 6	Milan	2–0	Chievo	Milan
20:45 CEST (UTC+02:00)	Muntari 55'; De Jong (yellow card) 65'; Honda 78'; El Shaarawy (yellow card) 90+5'	Report	Birsa (yellow card) 26'; Biraghi (yellow card) 44'; Cofie (yellow card) 77'; Zukanović (yellow card) 79'; Meggiorini (yellow card) 80'	Stadium: San Siro; Attendance: 34,601; Referee: Paolo Mazzoleni

18 October 2014 7	Roma	3–0	Chievo	Rome
18:00 CEST (UTC+02:00)	Destro 4'; Ljajić 25'; Totti 33' (pen.); Pjanić (yellow card) 57'	Report	López (yellow card) 58'	Stadium: Stadio Olimpico; Attendance: 41,522; Referee: Gianpaolo Calvarese

26 October 2014 8	Chievo	1–2	Genoa	Verona
15:00 CET (UTC+01:00)	Meggiorini (yellow card) 15'; Radovanović (yellow card) 27' (red card) 73'; Zukanović 36', (yellow card) 88'	Report	Burdisso (yellow card) 22'; Kucka (yellow card) 30'; Greco (yellow card) 54'; Matri 72'; Pinilla 84'	Stadium: Stadio Marc'Antonio Bentegodi; Attendance: 7,000; Referee: Marco Di Bello

29 October 2014 9	Palermo	1–0	Chievo	Palermo
20:45 CET (UTC+01:00)	Dybala (yellow card) 55'; Rigoni (yellow card) 62', (goal) 81'	Report	Sardo (yellow card) 53'	Stadium: Stadio Renzo Barbera; Attendance: 13,895; Referee: Sebastiano Peruzzo

2 November 2014 10	Chievo	0–0	Sassuolo	Verona
15:00 CET (UTC+01:00)	Meggiorini (yellow card) 26'	Report	Acerbi (yellow card) 22'; Magnanelli (yellow card) 36'; Sansone (yellow card) 40'; Vrsaljko (yellow card) 71'; Antei (yellow card) 75'; Floro Flores (yellow card) 90'	Stadium: Stadio Marc'Antonio Bentegodi; Attendance: 6,000; Referee: Marco Guida

9 November 2014 11	Chievo	2–1	Cesena	Verona
15:00 CET (UTC+01:00)	Meggiorini (yellow card) 12'; Gamberini (yellow card) 30'; Hetemaj (yellow card) 32'; Frey (yellow card) 45+1'; Pellissier 48', 90'	Report	Carbonero (yellow card) 59'; Lucchini (yellow card) 74'; Volta (yellow card) 82'; Đurić 88', (yellow card) 88'	Stadium: Stadio Marc'Antonio Bentegodi; Attendance: 5,000; Referee: Paolo Tagliavento

23 November 2014 12	Udinese	1–1	Chievo	Udine
15:00 CET (UTC+01:00)	Di Natale (yellow card) 31', (goal) 45+1'; Théréau (yellow card) 44'; Pinzi (yellow card) 64'	Report	Dainelli (yellow card) 26'; Radovanović 74'; Frey (yellow card) 90+1'	Stadium: Stadio Friuli; Attendance: 8,544; Referee: Angelo Cervellera

29 November 2014 13	Chievo	0–0	Lazio	Verona
20:45 CET (UTC+01:00)	Cesar (yellow card) 56'	Report		Stadium: Stadio Marc'Antonio Bentegodi; Attendance: 7,000; Referee: Luca Banti

8 December 2014 14	Cagliari	0–2	Chievo	Cagliari
19:00 CET (UTC+01:00)	Benedetti (yellow card) 23'; Cossu (yellow card) 41'; Conti (yellow card) 51'; Ekdal (yellow card) 56'; Farias (yellow card) 59'; Ibarbo (yellow card) 71'	Report	Meggiorini 3'; Paloschi 9'; Izco (yellow card) 19'; Zukanović (yellow card) 32'; Frey (yellow card) 56'	Stadium: Stadio Sant'Elia; Attendance: 14,500; Referee: Maurizio Mariani

15 December 2014 15	Chievo	0–2	Internazionale	Verona
21:00 CET (UTC+01:00)	Izco (yellow card) 22'; Cesar (yellow card) 38'; Meggiorini (yellow card) 42'; Botta (yellow card) 72' (red card) 73'	Report	Kovačić 19'; Handanović (yellow card) 45'; Ranocchia 55'	Stadium: Stadio Marc'Antonio Bentegodi; Attendance: 15,000; Referee: Davide Massa

21 December 2014 16	Hellas Verona	0–1	Chievo	Verona
12:30 CET (UTC+01:00)	Martić (yellow card) 27'; Tachtsidis (yellow card) 43'; Márquez (yellow card) 44'	Report	Radovanović (yellow card) 43'; Paloschi 81', (yellow card) 90+2'	Stadium: Stadio Marc'Antonio Bentegodi; Attendance: 22,927; Referee: Andrea Gervasoni

6 January 2015 17	Chievo	0–0	Torino	Verona
15:00 CET (UTC+01:00)	Meggiorini (yellow card) 26'; Hetemaj (yellow card) 45'	Report	Vives (yellow card) 40'; Farnerud (yellow card) 59'; Gazzi (yellow card) 88'	Stadium: Stadio Marc'Antonio Bentegodi; Attendance: 7,000; Referee: Rosario Abisso

11 January 2015 18	Atalanta	1–1	Chievo	Bergamo
15:00 CET (UTC+01:00)	Zappacosta (yellow card) 25', (goal) 72'; Dramé (yellow card) 81'; Biava (yellow card) 84'; Bellini (yellow card) 86' (yellow-red card) 89'	Report	Lazarević 90'	Stadium: Stadio Atleti Azzurri d'Italia; Attendance: 11,876; Referee: Paolo Valeri

18 January 2015 19	Chievo	1–2	Fiorentina	Verona
15:00 CET (UTC+01:00)	Hetemaj (yellow card) 17'; Cesar (yellow card) 63'; Pellissier 72'	Report	Badelj (yellow card) 33'; Rodríguez 35'; Babacar 90+4'	Stadium: Stadio Marc'Antonio Bentegodi; Attendance: 10,000; Referee: Angelo Cervellera

25 January 2015 20	Juventus	2–0	Chievo	Turin
15:00 CET (UTC+01:00)	Vidal (yellow card) 15'; Marchisio (yellow card) 58'; Pogba 60'; Lichtsteiner 73'	Report	Zukanović (yellow card) 20'; Frey (yellow card) 27'; Dainelli (yellow card) 45+3'; Schelotto (yellow card) 45+5'	Stadium: Juventus Stadium; Attendance: 38,629; Referee: Davide Massa

1 February 2015 21	Chievo	1–2	Napoli	Verona
15:00 CET (UTC+01:00)	Britos 25' (o.g.); Botta (yellow card) 63'	Report	Cesar 18' (o.g.); Gabbiadini 62'	Stadium: Stadio Marc'Antonio Bentegodi; Attendance: 15,000; Referee: Luca Banti

11 February 2015 22	Parma	0–1	Chievo	Parma
18:00 CET (UTC+01:00)	Feddal (yellow card) 16'; Galloppa (yellow card) 26' (yellow-red card) 31'; Santacroce (yellow card) 35'; Nocerino (yellow card) 68'	Report	Paloschi (yellow card) 45+2'; Frey (yellow card) 49'; Zukanović 54'; Radovanović (yellow card) 71'	Stadium: Stadio Ennio Tardini; Attendance: 10,270; Referee: Gianluca Rocchi

15 February 2015 23	Chievo	2–1	Sampdoria	Verona
18:00 CET (UTC+01:00)	Izco 2'; Meggiorini 39'; Hetemaj (yellow card) 82'; Bizzarri (yellow card) 90+3'; Botta (yellow card) 90+4'	Report	Mesbah (yellow card) 55'; Acquah (yellow card) 65'; Muriel 90+1'; Romagnoli (yellow card) 90+4'	Stadium: Stadio Marc'Antonio Bentegodi; Attendance: 9,128; Referee: Sebastiano Peruzzo

22 February 2015 24	Empoli	3–0	Chievo	Empoli
15:00 CET (UTC+01:00)	Rugani 22'; Maccarone 46', 67'	Report	Radovanović (yellow card) 36'; Botta (yellow card) 87'	Stadium: Stadio Carlo Castellani; Attendance: 7,338; Referee: Paolo Tagliavento

28 February 2015 25	Chievo	0–0	Milan	Verona
20:45 CET (UTC+01:00)	Pellissier (yellow card) 32'; Meggiorini (yellow card) 60'	Report	Alex (yellow card) 75'; Antonelli (yellow card) 85'	Stadium: Stadio Marc'Antonio Bentegodi; Attendance: 16,128; Referee: Gianpaolo Calvarese

8 March 2015 26	Chievo	0–0	Roma	Verona
15:00 CET (UTC+01:00)	Dainelli (yellow card) 37'; Cesar (yellow card) 52'; Hetemaj (yellow card) 78'; Birsa (yellow card) 88'	Report	Florenzi (yellow card) 39'; Nainggolan (yellow card) 41'	Stadium: Stadio Marc'Antonio Bentegodi; Attendance: 15,128; Referee: Paolo Mazzoleni

15 March 2015 27	Genoa	0–2	Chievo	Genoa
15:00 CET (UTC+01:00)	Bertolacci (yellow card) 11'; Falque (yellow card) 26'; Rincón (yellow card) 70'; De Maio (yellow card) 81'	Report	Hetemaj (yellow card) 21'; Paloschi 49', 68'; Dainelli (yellow card) 61'; Birsa (yellow card) 90+2'	Stadium: Stadio Luigi Ferraris; Attendance: 17,630; Referee: Daniele Doveri

21 March 2015 28	Chievo	1–0	Palermo	Verona
18:00 CET (UTC+01:00)	Paloschi 35'; Izco (yellow card) 42'	Report	Maresca (yellow card) 29'; Anđelković (yellow card) 61' (yellow-red card) 86'	Stadium: Stadio Marc'Antonio Bentegodi; Attendance: 9,128; Referee: Piero Giacomelli

4 April 2015 29	Sassuolo	1–0	Chievo	Reggio Emilia
15:00 CEST (UTC+02:00)	Berardi 23' (pen.); Peluso (yellow card) 38' (yellow-red card) 60'; Biondini (yellow card) 40'; Vrsaljko (yellow card) 48'	Report	Gamberini (yellow card) 22'; Radovanović (yellow card) 67'	Stadium: Mapei Stadium – Città del Tricolore; Attendance: 10,686; Referee: Luca Pairetto

12 April 2015 30	Cesena	0–1	Chievo	Cesena
12:30 CET (UTC+02:00)	Carbonero (yellow card) 61'; Đurić (yellow card) 63'	Report	Hetemaj (yellow card) 55'; Pellissier 82'	Stadium: Stadio Dino Manuzzi; Attendance: 15,094; Referee: Paolo Valeri

19 April 2015 31	Chievo	1–1	Udinese	Verona
15:00 CEST (UTC+02:00)	Pellissier 39'; Meggiorini (yellow card) 58'; Zukanović (yellow card) 59'; Birsa (yellow card) 64'	Report	Fernandes (yellow card) 31'; Allan (yellow card) 36'; Pinzi (yellow card) 45'; Cesar 71' (o.g.); Danilo (yellow card) 82'	Stadium: Stadio Marc'Antonio Bentegodi; Attendance: 9,000; Referee: Davide Massa

26 April 2015 32	Lazio	1–1	Chievo	Rome
15:00 CEST (UTC+02:00)	Klose 45'; Ledesma (yellow card) 47'; Onazi (yellow card) 57'	Report	Zukanović (yellow card) 10'; Radovanović (yellow card) 42'; Dainelli (yellow card) 49'; Cesar (yellow card) 66'; Paloschi 75'; Schelotto (yellow card) 84'	Stadium: Stadio Olimpico; Attendance: 45,359; Referee: Dino Tommasi

29 April 2015 33	Chievo	1–0	Cagliari	Verona
20:45 CEST (UTC+02:00)	Meggiorini 11'; Schelotto (yellow card) 49'; Botta (yellow card) 88'	Report	Ceppitelli (yellow card) 55'; Ekdal (yellow card) 60'; M'Poku (yellow card) 75'; Cossu (yellow card) 81' (yellow-red card) 89'; Murru (red card) 84'	Stadium: Stadio Marc'Antonio Bentegodi; Attendance: 9,128; Referee: Marco Di Bello

3 May 2015 34	Internazionale	0–0	Chievo	Milan
15:00 CEST (UTC+02:00)	Medel (yellow card) 36'; Podolski (yellow card) 63'; Shaqiri (yellow card) 86'	Report	Biraghi (yellow card) 25'	Stadium: San Siro; Attendance: 33,144; Referee: Marco Guida

10 May 2015 35	Chievo	2–2	Hellas Verona	Verona
12:30 CEST (UTC+02:00)	Hetemaj (yellow card) 3'; Paloschi 9'; Schelotto (yellow card) 19'; Pellissier 40' (pen.); Cesar (yellow card) 85'	Report	Janković (yellow card) 3'; Obbadi (yellow card) 5'; Juanito 20', (yellow card) 28'; Toni (yellow card) 21', (goal) 26'; Tachtsidis (yellow card) 76'	Stadium: Stadio Marc'Antonio Bentegodi; Attendance: 22,128; Referee: Nicola Rizzoli

17 May 2015 36	Torino	2–0	Chievo	Turin
15:00 CEST (UTC+02:00)	Maksimović (yellow card) 18'; Silva (yellow card) 45+3'; López 51', 69'; Moretti (yellow card) 52'	Report		Stadium: Stadio Olimpico di Torino; Attendance: 15,281; Referee: Gianluca Rocchi

24 May 2015 37	Chievo	1–1	Atalanta	Verona
15:00 CEST (UTC+02:00)	Cesar (yellow card) 41'; Pellissier 88'	Report	Gómez 48'	Stadium: Stadio Marc'Antonio Bentegodi; Attendance: 10,128; Referee: Juan Luca Sacchi

31 May 2015 38	Fiorentina	3–0	Chievo	Florence
20:45 CEST (UTC+02:00)	Iličić 12'; Bernardeschi (yellow card) 50', (goal) 76'; Badelj (yellow card) 85', (goal) 90+3'	Report	Dainelli (yellow card) 24'; Cofie (yellow card) 32' (yellow-red card) 69'	Stadium: Stadio Artemio Franchi; Attendance: 30,299; Referee: Paolo Valeri

=== Coppa Italia ===
22 August 2014 Third round	Pescara	1–0	Chievo	Pescara
20:30 CEST (UTC+02:00)	Maniero 38', (yellow card) 41'; Fiorillo (yellow card) 80'		Hetemaj (yellow card) 84'	Stadium: Stadio Adriatico; Attendance: 4,976; Referee: Antonio Damato

== Statistics ==
	Total	Home	Away
Games played	39	19	20
Games won	10	4	6
Games drawn	13	9	4
Games lost	16	6	10
Biggest win	2–0 v Cagliari; 2–0 v Genoa	2–1 v Cesena; 2–1 v Sampdoria; 1–0 Palermo; 1–0 v Cagliari	2–0 v Cagliari; 2–0 v Genoa
Biggest loss	0–3 v Roma; 0–3 v Empoli; 0–3 v Fiorentina	0–2 v Internazionale	0–3 v Roma; 0–3 v Empoli; 0–3 v Fiorentina
Biggest win (League)	2–0 v Cagliari; 2–0 v Genoa	2–1 v Cesena; 2–1 v Sampdoria; 1–0 Palermo; 1–0 v Cagliari	2–0 v Cagliari; 2–0 v Genoa
Biggest win (Cup)	–	–	–
Biggest loss (League)	0–3 v Roma; 0–3 v Empoli; 0–3 v Fiorentina	0–2 v Internazionale	0–3 v Roma; 0–3 v Empoli; 0–3 v Fiorentina
Biggest loss (Cup)	0–1 v Pescara	–	0–1 v Pescara
Clean sheets	14	7	7
Goals scored	28	16	12
Goals conceded	42	19	23
Goal difference	–14	–3	–11
Average GF per game	0.73	0.84	0.63
Average GA per game	1.02	1.00	1.05
Yellow cards	85	43	42
Red cards	3	2	1
Penalties for	1/2 (50.00%)	1/2 (50.00%)	0/0 (00.00%)
Penalties against	2/4 (50.00%)	0/1 (00.00%)	2/3 (66.67%)
League points	43	21	22
Winning rate	10/38 (26.31%)	4/19 (21.05%)	6/19 (31.57%)

=== Appearances and goals ===
No.	Pos	Nat	Player	Total		Serie A		Coppa Italia	
No.	Pos	Nat	Player	Apps	Goals	Apps	Goals	Apps	Goals
Goalkeepers
1	GK	(Argentina) ARG	Albano Bizzarri	28	0	28	0	0	0
17	GK	(Italy) ITA	Christian Puggioni	0	0	0	0	0	0
25	GK	(Italy) ITA	Francesco Bardi	11	0	10	0	1	0
32	GK	(Slovenia) SVN	Grega Sorčan	0	0	0	0	0	0
90	GK	(Italy) ITA	Andrea Seculin	0	0	0	0	0	0
Defenders
3	DF	(Italy) ITA	Dario Dainelli	31	0	28+2	0	1	0
12	DF	(Slovenia) SVN	Boštjan Cesar	29	0	27+1	0	1	0
20	DF	(Italy) ITA	Gennaro Sardo	9	0	5+4	0	0	0
21	DF	(France) FRA	Nicolas Frey	32	0	31	0	1	0
34	DF	(Italy) ITA	Cristiano Biraghi	19	0	13+5	0	1	0
55	DF	(Italy) ITA	Alessandro Gamberini	20	0	15+5	0	0	0
87	DF	(Bosnia and Herzegovina) BIH	Ervin Zukanović	29	2	28+1	2	0	0
Midfielders
7	MF	(Italy) ITA	Federico Mattiello	3	0	2+1	0	0	0
8	MF	(Serbia) SRB	Ivan Radovanović	31	1	29+2	1	0	0
10	MF	(Denmark) DEN	Anders Christiansen	4	0	2+2	0	0	0
11	MF	(Albania) ALB	Armando Vajushi	0	0	0	0	0	0
13	MF	(Argentina) ARG	Mariano Izco	29	2	28	2	1	0
14	MF	(Ghana) GHA	Isaac Cofie	18	0	8+10	0	0	0
18	MF	(Greece) GRE	Giannis Fetfatzidis	4	0	0+4	0	0	0
19	MF	(Argentina) ARG	Rubén Botta	21	0	5+16	0	0	0
24	MF	(Italy) ITA	Ezequiel Schelotto	29	0	26+3	0	0	0
56	MF	(Finland) FIN	Përparim Hetemaj	33	0	31+1	0	1	0
86	MF	(Slovenia) SVN	Valter Birsa	36	0	30+5	0	1	0
95	MF	(The Gambia) GAM	Lamin Jallow	0	0	0	0	0	0
Forwards
9	FW	(Italy) ITA	Nicola Pozzi	0	0	0	0	0	0
31	FW	(Italy) ITA	Sergio Pellissier	28	7	10+17	7	0+1	0
43	FW	(Italy) ITA	Alberto Paloschi	38	9	30+7	9	1	0
69	FW	(Italy) ITA	Riccardo Meggiorini	30	4	22+8	4	0	0
Players transferred out during the season
7	MF	(Slovenia) SVN	Dejan Lazarević	9	1	2+6	1	1	0
10	FW	(Argentina) ARG	Maxi López	14	1	7+6	1	1	0
26	DF	(Brazil) BRA	Edimar	1	0	0+1	0	0	0
63	MF	(Italy) ITA	Nicola Bellomo	6	0	0+5	0	1	0
84	MF	(France) FRA	Thomas Mangani	2	0	1	0	1	0

Last updated: 24 May 2015
Source: Competitions

=== Goalscorers ===
Rank	Pos.	Nat.	No.	Name	Serie A	Coppa Italia	Total
1	FW	(Italy)	43	Alberto Paloschi	9	0	9
2	FW	(Italy)	31	Sergio Pellissier	7	0	7
3	FW	(Italy)	69	Riccardo Meggiorini	4	0	4
4	MF	(Argentina)	13	Mariano Izco	2	0	2
4	DF	(Bosnia and Herzegovina)	87	Ervin Zukanović	2	0	2
6	MF	(Slovenia)	7	Dejan Lazarević	1	0	1
6	MF	(Serbia)	8	Ivan Radovanović	1	0	1
6	FW	(Argentina)	10	Maxi López	1	0	1
Own goals					1	0	1
TOTALS					28	0	28

Last updated: 24 May 2015
