= Fabio Caserta =

Italian football coach and former player

Personal information
- Date of birth: 24 September 1978 (age 48)
- Place of birth: Melito di Porto Salvo, Italy
- Height: 1.80 m (5 ft 11 in)
- Position: Midfielder

Senior career*
Years	Team	Apps	(Gls)
1997–1998	Locri	29	(9)
1998–1999	Pergocrema	29	(2)
1999–2000	Locri	32	(6)
2000–2004	Igea Virtus	116	(23)
2004–2007	Catania	96	(13)
2007–2008	Palermo	26	(1)
2008–2009	Lecce	33	(5)
2009–2011	Atalanta	15	(0)
2010–2011	→ Cesena (loan)	25	(1)
2012–2016	Juve Stabia	100	(14)

Managerial career
- 2017–2020: Juve Stabia
- 2020–2021: Perugia
- 2021–2022: Benevento
- 2023–2024: Cosenza
- 2024–2025: Catanzaro
- 2025: Bari
- 2026: Empoli
- * Club domestic league appearances and goals

Fabio Caserta (born 24 September 1978) is an Italian football coach and former player.

== Playing career ==
After a long career playing in minor divisions (Serie D with Locri, and Serie C2 with Igea Virtus), he was signed by Serie B side Catania in 2004, becoming a team leader and a fan favourite, as well as a protagonist in the successful 2005–06 campaign that brought the rossazzurri back into Serie A. After an impressive 2006–07 season, he was then signed on 31 August 2007 by arch-rivals Palermo. On 31 July 2008, Serie A newcomers Lecce bought the contract of Caserta from Palermo for €1.6million.

Atalanta successively acquired him for the 2009–10 season, after Lecce were relegated to Serie B.

On 24 June 2010, he was loaned to Serie A newcomer Cesena along with Maximiliano Pellegrino, as part of the deal that Atalanta bought Ezequiel Schelotto outright.

== Coaching career ==
After retirement, he stayed at Juve Stabia as part of head coach Gaetano Fontana's staff.

On 15 July 2017, he was announced as Juve Stabia's new head coach. In his second season in charge, he guided Juve Stabia to direct promotion to Serie B as Serie C/C winners. He left Juve Stabia following their relegation at the end of the 2019–20 season.

On 26 August 2020 he was hired by Serie C club Perugia. On his first season in charge, Perugia were crowned Girone B champions, thus ensuring themselves promotion to Serie B after only one season in the Italian third tier.

On 15 June 2021, one day after leaving Perugia by mutual consent, Caserta was unveiled as the new head coach of Serie B club Benevento, signing a two-year deal with the Campanians. After guiding Benevento to a playoff spot in his first season, he was confirmed for the 2022–23 campaign, and dismissed on 20 September 2022 following a disappointing start of the season.

He successively took over at Serie B club Cosenza before being dismissed on 11 March 2024.

On 5 July 2024, Caserta was hired by Catanzaro in Serie B on a two-year contract. Despite guiding Catanzaro to a promotion playoff spot by the end of the season, he was not confirmed. In June 2025, Caserta was hired as the new head coach of Serie B club Bari, a role he filled until 26 November 2025, when he was dismissed.

On 10 March 2026, Caserta was hired as the new head coach of Empoli.

== Managerial statistics ==
As of match played 16 September 2022

Managerial record by team and tenure
Team	Nat	From	To	Record							
Team	Nat	From	To	G	W	D	L	GF	GA	GD	Win %
Juve Stabia	(Italy)	15 July 2017	4 August 2020	123	51	37	35	177	137	+40	41.46
Perugia	(Italy)	26 August 2020	14 June 2021	42	25	10	7	73	36	+37	59.52
Benevento	(Italy)	15 June 2021	20 September 2022	50	23	10	17	73	51	+22	46.00
Total				215	99	57	59	323	224	+99	46.05

== Honours ==
=== Managerial ===
Juve Stabia

- Serie C: 2018–19 (Girone C)

Perugia

- Serie C: 2020–21 (Girone B)
