= Simone Tiribocchi =

Italian footballer

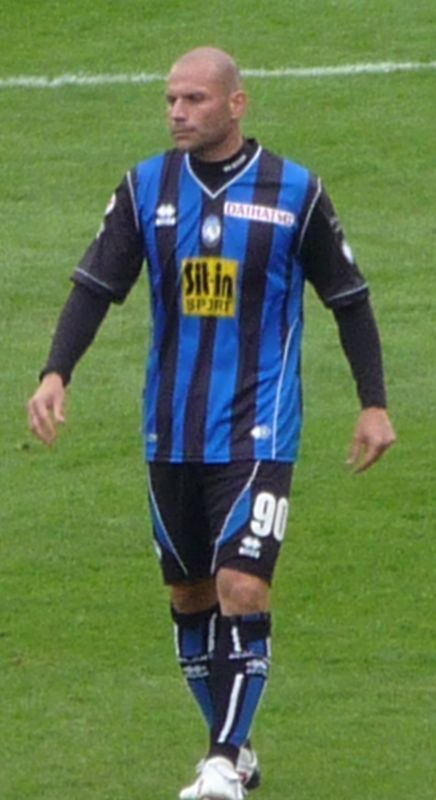

Personal information
- Date of birth: 31 January 1978 (age 48)
- Place of birth: Fiumicino, Italy
- Height: 1.82 m (6 ft 0 in)
- Position: Striker

Team information
- Current team: Olbia (head coach)

Youth career
- Lazio

Senior career*
Years	Team	Apps	(Gls)
1995–1996	Pistoiese	3	(0)
1996–2004	Torino	44	(11)
1998–1999	→ Savoia (loan)	28	(3)
1999–2000	→ Benevento (loan)	31	(9)
2000–2001	→ Siena (loan)	34	(8)
2002	→ Ancona (loan)	17	(3)
2002–2003	→ Siena (loan)	34	(16)
2004–2007	Chievo	59	(15)
2006–2009	Lecce	95	(39)
2009–2012	Atalanta	83	(26)
2012–2013	Pro Vercelli	19	(3)
2013–2014	Vicenza	38	(4)
Total		485	(137)

Managerial career
- 2017–: Olbia
- * Club domestic league appearances and goals

Simone Tiribocchi (born 31 January 1978) is a former Italian footballer who played as a forward. He is currently coaching Olbia in the Lega Pro league.

== Playing career ==
A Lazio youth product, Tiribocchi made his debut playing for Pistoiese in 1995. He moved to Empoli in 1996, but failed to make an appearance, and was signed by Torino Calcio later that year. He played for the Turin club for 8 seasons, although he spent half of them loaned to Serie B and Serie C1 clubs Savoia, Benevento, and Siena, where he won the Serie B title and Serie A promotion in 2003. He was signed by Serie A side A.C. Chievo Verona in July 2004. He scored 12 goals in 43 matches during his first two seasons with Chievo, and 3 more in 16 appearances during the first half of the 2006–07 Serie A season.

He moved to U.S. Lecce in January 2007, ending the season with 11 goals. Together with Lecce teammate Elvis Abbruscato, in 2007–2008 he formed one of the best duos of strikers in the Serie B tournament and managed to end the regular season with 16 goals. Tiribocchi played all four play-offs matches and scored 2 goals as Lecce regained a spot in the Serie A. Here he was one of the key-players for the salentini with another 11 goals, but his team was eventually relegated.

On 5 June 2009 Atalanta B.C. have signed the striker from U.S. Lecce until June 30, 2012.

He was transferred to Pro Vercelli in summer 2012 and to Vicenza in January 2013.

On 4 October 2013 he extended the contract with Vicenza to 30 June 2016.

== Style of play ==
A strong and physical striker, with good technique and an eye for goal, Tiribocchi was known for his ability in the air, as well as his power. A versatile player, who usually operated as a centre-forward, a position which allowed him to utilise his skills to hold up the ball for teammates and to provide depth to his team with his back to goal, he was capable of playing anywhere along the front-line. Throughout his career he was given the nickname il Tir, as he would imitate honking the horn of a lorry whenever he scored a goal.

== Coaching career ==
On 14 July 2014 Vicenza announced that Tiribocchi had joined the youth sector as coach. He would lead the born 2002 team in the Esordienti League of the Province of Vicenza, which the club also fielded one more team (born 2004) in the same league.

In July 2016, he joined Olbia as new Allievi youth coach. On 5 March 2017, he was promoted as new head coach in place of Michele Mignani.

== Honours ==
=== Player ===
Siena

- Serie B: 2002–03

Atalanta

- Serie B: 2010–11
