= 2005–06 Napoli Soccer season =

Napoli
2005–06 season
- Chairman: Aurelio De Laurentiis
- Manager: Edoardo Reja
- Stadium: Stadio San Paolo
- Serie C1: 1st (promoted)
- Coppa Italia: Round of 16
- Top goalscorer: League: Emanuele Calaiò (18); All: Emanuele Calaiò (19)
- Highest home attendance: 60,152 vs Roma
Home colours	Away colours	Third colours

The 2005–06 season was the 80th season in existence of Napoli Soccer and the club's second season in the third division of Italian football. In addition to the domestic league, Napoli participated in this season's edition of the Coppa Italia. The season covered the period from 1 July 2005 to 30 June 2006.

== Squad ==
Note: Flags indicate national team as defined under FIFA eligibility rules; some limited exceptions apply. Players may hold more than one non-FIFA nationality.

No.	Pos.	Nation	Player
—	GK	ITA	Matteo Gianello
—	GK	ITA	Gennaro Iezzo
—	DF	ITA	Andrea Briotti
—	DF	ITA	Roberto Civita
—	DF	ITA	Andrea Cupi
—	DF	ITA	Francesco Del Franco
—	DF	ITA	Luigi De Vito
—	DF	ITA	David Giubilato
—	DF	ITA	Gianluca Grava
—	DF	ITA	Luca Lacrimini
—	DF	ITA	Antonio Maddaloni
—	DF	PAR	Rubén Maldonado
—	DF	ITA	Elio Nigro
—	DF	ITA	Luigi Pisa
—	DF	ITA	Tommaso Romito
—	DF	ITA	Mirko Savini
—	MF	URU	Nicolás Amodio

No.	Pos.	Nation	Player
—	MF	URU	Mariano Bogliacino
—	MF	ITA	Mariano Arini
—	MF	ITA	Marco Capparella
—	MF	ITA	Gaetano Fontana
—	MF	ITA	Francesco Montervino (captain)
—	MF	ITA	Cataldo Montesanto
—	MF	ITA	Gaetano Perfetto
—	MF	ITA	Antonio Felice Rescigno
—	MF	ITA	Ivano Trotta
—	MF	ITA	Luigi Vitale
—	FW	ITA	Emanuele Calaiò
—	FW	ITA	Gaetano Grieco
—	FW	ITA	Umberto Prisco
—	FW	ITA	Mario Ramaglia
—	FW	ITA	Aniello Nappi
—	FW	BRA	Piá
—	FW	ARG	Roberto Sosa

== Competitions ==
=== Overview ===
Competition	First match	Last match	Starting round	Final position	Record							
Competition	First match	Last match	Starting round	Final position	Pld	W	D	L	GF	GA	GD	Win %
Serie C	26 August 2005	7 May 2006	Matchday 1	Winners	34	19	11	4	48	20	+28	55.88
Coppa Italia	7 August 2005	11 January 2006	First round	Round of 16	5	3	0	2	4	5	−1	60.00
Total					39	22	11	6	52	25	+27	56.41

Source: Competitions

=== Serie C1 ===
==== League table ====
Pos	Team	Pld	W	D	L	GF	GA	GD	Pts	Promotion or relegation
1	Napoli (C, P)	34	19	11	4	48	20	+28	68	Promoted to the Serie B
2	Frosinone (P)	34	15	10	9	43	37	+6	55	Won promotion playoffs
3	Sassari Torres (R)	34	12	17	5	44	32	+12	53	Relegated to the Serie C2 (Note: Gela and Sassari Torres declared bankrupt and relegated to Serie C2.)
4	Grosseto	34	12	15	7	43	32	+11	51	Lost in promotion playoffs
5	Sangiovannese	34	12	15	7	37	34	+3	51	Lost in promotion playoffs

(C) Champions; (P) Promoted; (R) Relegated

==== Results summary ====
Overall								Home						Away					
Pld	W	D	L	GF	GA	GD	Pts	W	D	L	GF	GA	GD	W	D	L	GF	GA	GD
34	19	11	4	48	20	+28	68	13	4	0	29	5	+24	6	7	4	19	15	+4

==== Results by round ====
Round	1	2	3	4	5	6	7	8	9	10	11	12	13	14	15	16	17	18	19	20	21	22	23	24	25	26	27	28	29	30	31	32	33	34
Ground	A	H	A	H	A	H	A	H	A	A	H	A	H	A	H	A	H	A	A	H	A	H	A	H	A	H	H	A	H	A	H	A	H	A
Result	W	W	W	D	D	W	D	W	D	W	W	W	D	L	D	W	W	W	L	W	L	W	L	W	W	W	W	D	W	D	W	D	D	D
Position	5	4	3	4	6	5	5	3	3	2	2	1	1	1	1	1	1	1	1	1	1	1	1	1	1	1	1	1	1	1	1	1	1	1

A = Away; H = Home; W = Win; D = Draw; L = Loss

==== Matches ====
28 August 2005 1	Acireale	0–2	Napoli	Acireale
14:30 CEST (UTC+2)			Calaiò 14', 46'	Stadium: Stadio Tupparello; Attendance: 2,600; Referee: Fabrizio Lena

4 September 2005 2	Napoli	1–0	Massese	Naples
14:30 CEST (UTC+2)	Calaiò 26'			Stadium: Stadio San Paolo; Attendance: 16,147; Referee: Cristian Zanzi

11 September 2005 3	Lucchese	0–1	Napoli	Lucca
14:30 CEST (UTC+2)			Maldonado 68'	Stadium: Stadio Porta Elisa; Attendance: 8,888; Referee: Daniele Orsato

19 September 2005 4	Napoli	0–0	Torres	Naples
14:30 CEST (UTC+2)				Stadium: Stadio San Paolo; Attendance: 20,992; Referee: Massimiliano Velotto

25 September 2005 5	Pistoiese	1–1	Napoli	Pistoia
14:30 CEST (UTC+2)	Zizzari 22'		Piá 31'	Stadium: Stadio Marcello Melani; Attendance: 6,091; Referee: Domenico Celi

2 October 2005 6	Napoli	1–0	Juve Stabia	Naples
14:30 CEST (UTC+2)	Grava 71'			Stadium: Stadio San Paolo; Attendance: 28,386; Referee: Denis Salati

9 October 2005 7	Gela	0–0	Napoli	Gela
14:30 CEST (UTC+2)				Stadium: Stadio Vincenzo Presti; Attendance: 4,000; Referee: Andrea Gervasoni

16 October 2005 8	Napoli	3–0	Manfredonia	Naples
14:30 CEST (UTC+2)	Fontana 33'; Romito 58'; Montervino 85'			Stadium: Stadio San Paolo; Attendance: 21,009; Referee: Massimo Mannella

23 October 2005 9	Martina	1–1	Napoli	Martina Franca
14:30 CEST (UTC+2)	Fanesi 29'		Calaiò 27' (pen.)	Stadium: Stadio Gian Domenico Tursi; Attendance: 3,389; Referee: Valerio Scoditti

6 November 2005 10	Pisa	0–3	Napoli	Pisa
14:30 CET (UTC+1)			Calaiò 37', 46'; Montervino 90+1'	Stadium: Arena Garibaldi – Stadio Romeo Anconetani; Attendance: 11,383; Referee: Daniele Orsato

13 November 2005 11	Napoli	4–1	Sangiovannese	Naples
14:30 CET (UTC+1)	Sosa 12', 39'; Fontana 22'; Calaiò 52' (pen.)		Baiano 33'	Stadium: Stadio San Paolo; Attendance: 33,585; Referee: Fabrizio Lena

20 November 2005 12	Chieti	1–2	Napoli	Chieti
14:30 CET (UTC+1)	Virdis 66' (pen.)		Calaiò 25'; Tomei 51' (o.g.)	Stadium: Stadio Guido Angelini; Attendance: 11,383; Referee: Damato

27 November 2005 13	Napoli	2–2	Foggia	Naples
14:30 CET (UTC+1)	Fontana 10'; Piá 33'		Cantoro 9', 13'	Stadium: Stadio San Paolo; Attendance: 35,000; Referee: Dino Tommasi

2 December 2005 14	Perugia	1–0	Napoli	Perugia
14:30 CET (UTC+1)	Cellini 25'			Stadium: Stadio Renato Curi; Attendance: 7,000; Referee: Domenico Celi

18 December 2005 16	Frosinone	1–3	Napoli	Frosinone
14:30 CET (UTC+1)	Mastronunzio 11'		Bogliacino 40', 81'; Piá 60'	Stadium: Stadio Matusa; Attendance: 4,854; Referee: Andrea Gervasoni

21 December 2005 17	Napoli	3–0	Lanciano	Naples
14:30 CET (UTC+1)	Sosa 2'; Bogliacino 34'; Capparella 46'			Stadium: Stadio San Paolo; Attendance: 25,000; Referee: Alberto Zanardo

5 January 2006 15	Napoli	1–1	Grosseto	Naples
14:30 CET (UTC+1)	Capparella 3'		Pellicori 90' (pen.)	Stadium: Stadio San Paolo; Attendance: 22,809; Referee: Denis Salati

8 January 2006 18	Napoli	1–0	Acireale	Naples
14:30 CET (UTC+1)	Sosa 33'			Stadium: Stadio San Paolo; Attendance: 20,000; Referee: Cristian Zanzi

15 January 2006 19	Massese	1–0	Napoli	Massa
14:30 CET (UTC+1)	Vagnati 26'			Stadium: Stadio degli Oliveti; Attendance: 4,500; Referee: Valerio Scoditti

22 January 2006 20	Napoli	1–0	Lucchese	Naples
14:30 CET (UTC+1)	Bogliacino 31'			Stadium: Stadio San Paolo; Attendance: 25,000; Referee: Marco Forconi

29 January 2006 21	Torres	2–0	Napoli	Sassari
14:30 CET (UTC+1)	Evacuo 37', 63'			Stadium: Stadio Vanni Sanna; Attendance: 10,000; Referee: Dino Tommasi

5 February 2006 22	Napoli	2–0	Pistoiese	Naples
14:30 CET (UTC+1)	Calaiò 24', 84'			Stadium: Stadio San Paolo; Attendance: 20,000; Referee: Andrea Bo

19 February 2006 24	Juve Stabia	3–1	Napoli	Castellammare di Stabia
14:30 CET (UTC+1)	Romito 12' (o.g.); Agnelli 15'; Castaldo 69'		Calaiò 44'	Stadium: Stadio Romeo Menti; Attendance: 5,680; Referee: Antonio Damato

26 February 2006 24	Napoli	2–0	Gela	Naples
14:30 CET (UTC+1)	Calaiò 30'; Trotta 61'			Stadium: Stadio San Paolo; Attendance: 15,000; Referee: Nicola Pierpaoli

5 March 2006 25	Manfredonia	0–1	Napoli	Manfredonia
14:30 CET (UTC+1)			Piá 59'	Stadium: Stadio Miramare; Attendance: 4,000; Referee: Massimiliano Velotto

12 March 2006 26	Napoli	1–0	Martina	Naples
14:30 CET (UTC+1)	Piá 6'			Stadium: Stadio San Paolo; Attendance: 20,000; Referee: Fabrizio Lena

19 March 2006 27	Napoli	2–0	Pisa	Naples
14:30 CET (UTC+1)	Calaiò 10', 16'			Stadium: Stadio San Paolo; Attendance: 25,000; Referee: Valerio Scoditti

26 March 2006 28	Sangiovannese	1–1	Napoli	San Giovanni Valdarno
15:00 CEST (UTC+2)	Baiano 42'		Calaiò 38'	Stadium: Stadio Virgilio Fedini; Attendance: 4,000; Referee: Andrea Gervasoni

2 April 2006 29	Napoli	2–0	Chieti	Naples
15:00 CEST (UTC+2)	Sosa 4'; Bogliacino 57'			Stadium: Stadio San Paolo; Attendance: 22,000; Referee: Michele Cavarretta

11 April 2006 30	Foggia	1–1	Napoli	Foggia
15:00 CEST (UTC+2)	Frezza 51'		Calaiò 68'	Stadium: Stadio Pino Zaccheria; Attendance: 5,000; Referee: Cristian Zanzi

15 April 2006 31	Napoli	2–0	Perugia	Naples
15:00 CEST (UTC+2)	Calaiò 20'; Capparella 67'			Stadium: Stadio San Paolo; Attendance: 45,000; Referee: Denis Salati

23 April 2006 32	Grosseto	2–2	Napoli	Grosseto
15:00 CEST (UTC+2)	Sorrentino 55'; Consonni 72'		Calaiò 13'; Montervino 42'	Stadium: Stadio Carlo Zecchini; Attendance: 6,000; Referee: Domenico Celi

30 April 2006 33	Napoli	1–1	Frosinone	Naples
15:00 CEST (UTC+2)	Sosa 13'		Mastronunzio 3'	Stadium: Stadio San Paolo; Attendance: 50,000; Referee: Massimo Mannella

7 May 2006 34	Lanciano	0–0	Napoli	Lanciano
15:00 CEST (UTC+2)				Stadium: Stadio Guido Biondi; Attendance: 3,000; Referee: Christian Rubino

=== Coppa Italia ===
7 August 2005 First round	Napoli	2–0	Pescara	Naples
16:00 CEST (UTC+2)	Calaiò 45+1'; Sosa 79'			Stadium: Stadio San Paolo; Attendance: 5,000; Referee: Stefano Farina

15 August 2005 Second round	Napoli	1–0	Reggina	Naples
21:00 CEST (UTC+2)	Capparella 73'			Stadium: Stadio San Paolo; Attendance: 9,410; Referee: Salvatore Racalbuto

21 August 2005 Third round	Napoli	1–0	Piacenza	Naples
21:00 CEST (UTC+2)	Sosa 90+1'			Stadium: Stadio San Paolo; Attendance: 25,849; Referee: Luca Palanca

8 December 2005 Round of 16; First leg	Napoli	0–3	Roma	Naples
15:00 CET (UTC+1)			Aquilani 34'; Nonda 40'; Okaka 83'	Stadium: Stadio San Paolo; Attendance: 60,152; Referee: Paolo Dondarini

11 January 2006 Round of 16; Second leg	Roma	2–1	Napoli	Rome
15:00 CET (UTC+1)	Aquilani 39'; Mancini 45'		Amodio 90+2'	Stadium: Stadio Olimpico; Attendance: 43,768; Referee: Mauro Bergonzi
