= 2006–07 SSC Napoli season =

Napoli
2006–07 season
- Chairman: Aurelio De Laurentiis
- Manager: Edoardo Reja
- Stadium: Stadio San Paolo
- Serie B: 2nd (promoted)
- Coppa Italia: Round of 16
- Top goalscorer: League: Emanuele Calaiò (14); All: Emanuele Calaiò (16)
- Highest home attendance: 59,406 vs Lecce
- Lowest home attendance: 7,000 vs Parma
- Average home league attendance: 35,176
Home colours	Away colours	Third colours

The 2006–07 season was the 81st season in the existence of SSC Napoli and the club's first season back in the second division of Italian football. They participated in the Serie B and Coppa Italia.

== Squad ==
Note: Flags indicate national team as defined under FIFA eligibility rules; some limited exceptions apply. Players may hold more than one non-FIFA nationality.

No.	Pos.	Nation	Player
1	GK	ITA	Gennaro Iezzo (captain)
2	DF	ITA	Gianluca Grava
3	DF	ITA	Erminio Rullo
4	MF	ITA	Francesco Montervino
5	MF	ITA	Fabio Gatti
6	DF	PAR	Rubén Maldonado
7	MF	ITA	Ivano Trotta
8	FW	BRA	Piá
9	FW	ARG	Roberto Sosa
11	FW	ITA	Emanuele Calaiò
12	GK	ITA	Giuseppe Marino
14	DF	AUT	György Garics
16	DF	ITA	Andrea Cupi

No.	Pos.	Nation	Player
17	MF	ITA	Marco Capparella
18	MF	URU	Mariano Bogliacino
19	DF	ITA	Mirko Savini
20	FW	ITA	Roberto De Zerbi
21	MF	URU	Nicolás Amodio
22	GK	ITA	Matteo Gianello
23	DF	ITA	David Giubilato
24	MF	ITA	Samuele Dalla Bona
25	MF	ITA	Luigi Vitale
26	DF	ITA	Maurizio Domizzi
28	DF	ITA	Paolo Cannavaro
29	FW	ITA	Cristian Bucchi
33	DF	ITA	Mario D'Urso

== Competitions ==
=== Overview ===
Competition	First match	Last match	Starting round	Final position	Record							
Competition	First match	Last match	Starting round	Final position	Pld	W	D	L	GF	GA	GD	Win %
Serie B	31 August 2006	10 June 2007	Matchday 1	2nd	42	21	16	5	52	29	+23	50.00
Coppa Italia	19 August 2006	7 December 2006	First round	Round of 16	5	3	1	1	9	7	+2	60.00
Total					47	24	17	6	61	36	+25	51.06

Source: Competitions

=== Serie B ===
==== League table ====
Pos	Team	Pld	W	D	L	GF	GA	GD	Pts	Promotion or relegation
1	Juventus (Note: Juventus started the season with a penalization of 30 points, which was later reduced to 9 on appeal) (C, P)	42	28	10	4	83	30	+53	85	Promotion to Serie A
2	Napoli (P)	42	21	16	5	52	29	+23	79	Promotion to Serie A
3	Genoa (Note: Third-placed team Genoa were directly promoted without a play-off being played as they finished 10 points ahead of fourth-placed Piacenza) (P)	42	23	9	10	68	44	+24	78	Promotion to Serie A
4	Piacenza	42	20	8	14	57	50	+7	68	
5	Rimini	42	17	16	9	55	38	+17	67 (Note: RIM 2–0 BRE; BRE 0–2 RIM)	

Source: Almanacco Illustrato del Calcio 2008 (in Italian). Panini Edizioni. November 2007.
Rules for classification: 1) points; 2) head-to-head points; 3) head-to-head goal difference; 4) head-to-head goals scored; 5) goal difference; 6) number of goals scored
(C) Champions; (P) Promoted

==== Results summary ====
Overall								Home						Away					
Pld	W	D	L	GF	GA	GD	Pts	W	D	L	GF	GA	GD	W	D	L	GF	GA	GD
42	21	16	5	52	29	+23	79	12	9	0	28	12	+16	9	7	5	24	17	+7

Source: Serie B

==== Results by round ====
Round	1	2	3	4	5	6	7	8	9	10	11	12	13	14	15	16	17	18	19	20	21	22	23	24	25	26	27	28	29	30	31	32	33	34	35	36	37	38	39	40	41	42
Ground	H	A	A	H	A	H	A	H	A	H	A	H	A	H	A	H	H	A	H	A	H	A	H	H	A	H	A	H	A	H	A	H	A	H	A	H	A	A	H	A	H	A
Result	W	L	D	D	W	W	D	W	L	D	W	W	W	D	D	D	W	D	W	D	D	W	W	D	W	W	D	D	L	W	L	D	W	W	W	W	L	W	D	W	W	D
Position	1	8	7	9	6	3	4	2	7	7	4	1	1	1	3	5	2	4	2	2	2	2	1	2	2	2	1	2	2	2	3	3	3	3	2	2	3	3	3	3	2	2

Source: Serie B
A = Away; H = Home; W = Win; D = Draw; L = Loss

==== Matches ====
9 September 2006 1	Napoli	4–2	Treviso	Naples
16:00 CEST (UTC+2)	Bucchi 30', 56' (pen.); Grava 43'; Dalla Bona 79'		Beghetto 77'; Domizzi 78' (o.g.)	Stadium: Stadio San Paolo; Attendance: 38,880; Referee: Paolo Dondarini

16 September 2006 2	Piacenza	2–1	Napoli	Piacenza
16:00 CEST (UTC+2)	Nocerino 25'; Riccio 79'		Calaiò 33'	Stadium: Stadio Leonardo Garilli; Attendance: 8,490; Referee: Nicola Ayroldi

19 September 2006 3	Arezzo	0–0	Napoli	Arezzo
20:30 CEST (UTC+2)				Stadium: Stadio Città di Arezzo; Attendance: 9,017; Referee: Roberto Rosetti

23 September 2006 4	Napoli	1–1	Triestina	Naples
16:00 CEST (UTC+2)	Bucchi 18'		Kyriazis 85'	Stadium: Stadio San Paolo; Attendance: 29,993; Referee: Oberdan Pantana

30 September 2006 5	Spezia	0–1	Napoli	La Spezia
16:00 CEST (UTC+2)			P. Cannavaro 71'	Stadium: Stadio Alberto Picco; Attendance: 14,395; Referee: Luca Banti

8 October 2006 6	Napoli	1–0	Rimini	Naples
16:00 CEST (UTC+2)	De Zerbi 80'			Stadium: Stadio San Paolo; Attendance: 38,236; Referee: Gianluca Rocchi

13 October 2006 7	Vicenza	1–1	Napoli	Vicenza
20:30 CEST (UTC+2)	Cavalli 89'		Calaiò 43'	Stadium: Stadio Romeo Menti; Attendance: 8,303; Referee: Paolo Tagliavento

21 October 2006 8	Napoli	1–0	Crotone	Naples
16:00 CEST (UTC+2)	Calaiò 9'			Stadium: Stadio San Paolo; Attendance: 27,043; Referee: Maurizio Ciampi

28 October 2006 9	AlbinoLeffe	1–0	Napoli	Bergamo
16:00 CET (UTC+1)	Cellini 45' (pen.)			Stadium: Stadio Atleti Azzurri d'Italia; Attendance: 3,000; Referee: Andrea De Marco

6 November 2006 10	Napoli	1–1	Juventus	Naples
21:00 CEST (UTC+2)	Bogliacino 73'		Del Piero 67'	Stadium: Stadio San Paolo; Attendance: 58,954; Referee: Nicola Rizzoli

13 November 2006 11	Bari	0–1	Napoli	Bari
20:45 CET (UTC+1)			Calaiò 43'	Stadium: Stadio San Nicola; Attendance: 24,924; Referee: Stefano Farina

18 November 2006 12	Napoli	1–0	Bologna	Naples
16:00 CET (UTC+1)	Calaiò 39' (pen.)			Stadium: Stadio San Paolo; Attendance: 36,083; Referee: Roberto Rosetti

25 November 2006 13	Pescara	0–1	Napoli	Pescara
16:00 CET (UTC+1)			Calaiò 56' (pen.)	Stadium: Stadio Adriatico; Attendance: 6,258; Referee: Stefano Farina

2 December 2006 14	Napoli	1–1	Frosinone	Naples
16:00 CET (UTC+1)	Bogliacino 87'		Lodi 79'	Stadium: Stadio San Paolo; Attendance: 29,449; Referee: Daniele Orsato

11 December 2006 15	Cesena	1–1	Napoli	Cesena
20:45 CET (UTC+1)	Waigo 21'		Calaiò 19'	Stadium: Stadio Dino Manuzzi; Attendance: 12,842; Referee: Paolo Dondarini

16 December 2006 16	Napoli	0–0	Mantova	Naples
16:00 CET (UTC+1)				Stadium: Stadio San Paolo; Attendance: 0 Referee: Domenico Celi

19 December 2006 17	Napoli	3–1	Brescia	Naples
21:30 CET (UTC+1)	Dalla Bona 5'; Bucchi 50'; Bogliacino 69'		Hamšík 64'	Stadium: Stadio San Paolo; Attendance: 25,593; Referee: Antonio Damato

22 December 2006 18	Modena	0–0	Napoli	Modena
21:30 CET (UTC+1)				Stadium: Stadio Alberto Braglia; Attendance: 11,501; Referee: Tiziano Pieri

13 January 2007 19	Napoli	1–0	Hellas Verona	Naples
16:00 CET (UTC+1)	Bucchi 82' (pen.)			Stadium: Stadio San Paolo; Attendance: 33,081; Referee: Nicola Stefanini

20 January 2007 20	Lecce	1–1	Napoli	Lecce
16:00 CET (UTC+1)	Polenghi 13'		De Zerbi 24'	Stadium: Stadio Via del Mare; Attendance: 8,440; Referee: Oscar Girardi

29 January 2007 21	Napoli	1–1	Genoa	Naples
20:45 CET (UTC+1)	Calaiò 82' (pen.)		León 87'	Stadium: Stadio San Paolo; Attendance: 49,708; Referee: Nicola Pierpaoli

10 February 2007 23	Napoli	1–0	Piacenza	Naples
16:00 CET (UTC+1)	Sosa 80'			Stadium: Stadio San Paolo; Attendance: 0 Referee: Luca Marelli

18 February 2007 24	Napoli	2–2	Arezzo	Naples
16:00 CET (UTC+1)	Bucchi 14'; Sosa 83'		Bondi 55'; Volpato 90+2'	Stadium: Stadio San Paolo; Attendance: 0 Referee: Daniele Orsato

24 February 2007 25	Triestina	1–3	Napoli	Trieste
16:00 CET (UTC+1)	Cerón 9'		P. Cannavaro 33'; Bucchi 51'; De Zerbi 75'	Stadium: Stadio Nereo Rocco; Attendance: 5,353; Referee: Maurizio Ciampi

3 March 2007 26	Napoli	3–1	Spezia	Naples
16:00 CET (UTC+1)	Bogliacino 47'; Calaiò 80'; Bucchi 90+2'		Colombo 52'	Stadium: Stadio San Paolo; Attendance: 19,553; Referee: Antonio Giannoccaro

10 March 2007 27	Rimini	1–1	Napoli	Rimini
16:00 CET (UTC+1)	Jeda 48' (pen.)		Calaiò 20' (pen.)	Stadium: Stadio Romeo Neri; Attendance: 9,200; Referee: Paolo Dondarini

14 March 2007 28	Napoli	0–0	Vicenza	Naples
21:00 CET (UTC+1)				Stadium: Stadio San Paolo; Attendance: 19,553; Referee: Tiziano Pieri

17 March 2007 29	Crotone	2–1	Napoli	Crotone
16:00 CET (UTC+1)	Šedivec 8'; Giampaolo 18'		Zamboni 41' (o.g.)	Stadium: Stadio Ezio Scida; Attendance: 6,521; Referee: Domenico Messina

25 March 2007 31	Juventus	2–0	Napoli	Turin
16:00 CET (UTC+1)	Camoranesi 18'; Del Piero 50'			Stadium: Stadio Olimpico di Torino; Attendance: 21,444; Referee: Nicola Ayroldi

31 March 2007 32	Napoli	1–1	Bari	Naples
16:00 CEST (UTC+2)	Bogliacino 77'		Eramo 39'	Stadium: Stadio San Paolo; Attendance: 26,787; Referee: Andrea Gervasoni

7 April 2007 33	Bologna	2–3	Napoli	Bologna
20:30 CEST (UTC+2)	Marazzina 57', 72'		Domizzi 9'; Maldonado 25'; Calaiò 38'	Stadium: Stadio Renato Dall'Ara; Attendance: 15,343; Referee: Gianluca Paparesta

14 April 2007 34	Napoli	1–0	Pescara	Naples
16:00 CEST (UTC+2)	Bogliacino 13'			Stadium: Stadio San Paolo; Attendance: 27,526; Referee: Luca Banti

17 April 2007 22	Treviso	0–3	Napoli	Treviso
20:30 CEST (UTC+2)			Piá 4'; Calaiò 55'; Montervino 90'	Stadium: Stadio Omobono Tenni; Attendance: 4,996; Referee: Stefano Farina

21 April 2007 35	Frosinone	1–2	Napoli	Frosinone
16:00 CEST (UTC+2)	Castillo 62'		Sosa 66'; Trotta 89'	Stadium: Stadio Matusa; Attendance: 7,080; Referee: Oscar Girardi

28 April 2007 36	Napoli	2–0	Cesena	Naples
16:00 CEST (UTC+2)	Sosa 7'; Trotta 90+6'			Stadium: Stadio San Paolo; Attendance: 33,346; Referee: Massimo Palanca

1 May 2007 30	Napoli	1–0	AlbinoLeffe	Naples
20:30 CEST (UTC+2)	Sosa 33'			Stadium: Stadio San Paolo; Attendance: 41,762; Referee: Gabriele Gava

5 May 2007 37	Mantova	1–0	Napoli	Mantova
16:00 CEST (UTC+2)	Caridi 45+3'			Stadium: Stadio Danilo Martelli; Attendance: 11,870; Referee: Domenico Messina

15 May 2007 38	Brescia	0–1	Napoli	Brescia
18:00 CEST (UTC+2)			Piá 39'	Stadium: Stadio Mario Rigamonti; Attendance: 4,600; Referee: Roberto Rosetti

19 May 2007 39	Napoli	1–1	Modena	Naples
16:00 CEST (UTC+2)	Sosa 32'		Tamburini 45'	Stadium: Stadio San Paolo; Attendance: 39,246; Referee: Oberdan Pantana

26 May 2007 40	Hellas Verona	1–3	Napoli	Verona
16:00 CEST (UTC+2)	Pulzetti 60'		Domizzi 47'; Calaiò 56'; Dalla Bona 90+4'	Stadium: Stadio Marcantonio Bentegodi; Attendance: 10,941; Referee: Morganti

3 June 2007 41	Napoli	1–0	Lecce	Naples
16:00 CEST (UTC+2)	Calaiò 7'			Stadium: Stadio San Paolo; Attendance: 59,406; Referee: Paolo Dondarini

10 June 2007 42	Genoa	0–0	Napoli	Genoa
16:00 CEST (UTC+2)				Stadium: Stadio Luigi Ferraris; Attendance: 32,530; Referee: Gianluca Rocchi

=== Coppa Italia ===
19 August 2006 First round	Napoli	3–1	Frosinone	Naples
21:00 CEST (UTC+2)	Domizzi 7'; Bucchi 30'; Calaiò 59' (pen.)		Ginestra 79'	Stadium: Stadio San Paolo; Attendance: 11,214; Referee: Paolo Bertini

23 August 2006 Second round	Napoli	1–0 (a.e.t.)	Ascoli	Naples
21:00 CEST (UTC+2)	Piá 91'			Stadium: Stadio San Paolo; Attendance: 23,208; Referee: Gianluca Rocchi

27 August 2006 Third round	Napoli	3–3 (a.e.t.) (5–4 p)	Juventus	Naples
21:00 CEST (UTC+2)	Bucchi 38'; Calaiò 53'; Cannavaro 107'		Chiellini 27'; Del Piero 78', 105'	Stadium: Stadio San Paolo; Attendance: 56,295; Referee: Matteo Trefoloni
	Penalties
	Trotta (penalty scored); Bucchi (penalty scored); Domizzi (penalty scored); Dalla Bona (penalty missed); P. Cannavaro (penalty missed); Montervino (penalty scored); Amodio (penalty scored)		(penalty missed) Buffon; (penalty scored) Guzmán; (penalty scored) Birindelli; (penalty missed) Marchionni; (penalty scored) Del Piero; (penalty scored) Chiellini; (penalty missed) Balzaretti

9 November 2006 Round of 16; First leg	Napoli	1–0	Parma	Naples
21:00 CET (UTC+1)	Bucchi 68' (pen.)			Stadium: Stadio San Paolo; Attendance: 7,000; Referee: Luca Marelli

7 December 2006 Round of 16; Second leg	Parma	3–1 (3–2 agg.)	Napoli	Parma
15:00 CET (UTC+1)	Cigarini 47' (pen.); Dedić 55', 68'		Dalla Bona 85'	Stadium: Stadio Ennio Tardini; Attendance: 2,829; Referee: Gianluca Paparesta
