= 2008–09 SSC Napoli season =

Napoli
2008–09 season
- Chairman: Aurelio De Laurentiis
- Manager: Edoardo Reja (until 8 March); Roberto Donadoni (from 10 March)
- Stadium: Stadio San Paolo
- Serie A: 12th
- Coppa Italia: Quarter-finals
- UEFA Intertoto Cup: Overall winners
- UEFA Cup: First Round
- Top goalscorer: League: Marek Hamšík (9); All: Marek Hamšík (12)
- Highest home attendance: 60,240 vs Roma (25 January 2009)
- Lowest home attendance: 26,553 vs Fiorentina (14 September 2008)
- Average home league attendance: 39,851
Home colours	Away colours	Third colours

2008–09 Serie A was the 67th Serie A season in the history of Società Sportiva Calcio Napoli, and their 83rd overall.

== Squad ==
Note: Flags indicate national team as defined under FIFA eligibility rules; some limited exceptions apply. Players may hold more than one non-FIFA nationality.

No.	Pos.	Nation	Player
1	GK	ITA	Gennaro Iezzo
2	DF	ITA	Gianluca Grava
3	DF	ITA	Luigi Vitale
4	MF	ITA	Francesco Montervino
5	MF	ITA	Michele Pazienza
6	DF	ITA	Salvatore Aronica
7	FW	ARG	Ezequiel Lavezzi
8	MF	ITA	Manuele Blasi
9	FW	ARG	Germán Denis
11	MF	ITA	Christian Maggio
12	FW	BRA	Piá
13	DF	ITA	Fabiano Santacroce
14	FW	ITA	Roberto De Zerbi
15	MF	ARG	Jesús Dátolo
17	MF	SVK	Marek Hamšík

No.	Pos.	Nation	Player
18	MF	URU	Mariano Bogliacino
20	FW	ITA	Andrea Russotto
22	GK	ITA	Matteo Gianello
23	MF	URU	Walter Gargano
24	MF	ITA	Samuele Dalla Bona
25	FW	URU	Marcelo Zalayeta
28	DF	ITA	Paolo Cannavaro (captain)
30	GK	ARG	Nicolás Navarro
32	MF	URU	Nicolás Amodio
44	GK	ITA	Luigi Sepe
70	GK	ITA	Luca Bucci
77	MF	ITA	Daniele Mannini
83	DF	ITA	Leandro Rinaudo
96	DF	ITA	Matteo Contini

== Pre-season and friendlies ==
11 July 2008	Hajduk Split (Croatia)	1–0	(Italy) Napoli	Split, Croatia
	Linić 29'			Stadium: Stadion Poljud

15 July 2008	Zalaegerszegi TE (Hungary)	1–1	(Italy) Napoli	Zalaegerszeg, Hungary
	Waltner 30'		Piá 44'	Stadium: ZTE Arena

== Competitions ==
=== Serie A ===
==== League table ====
Pos	Team	Pld	W	D	L	GF	GA	GD	Pts	Qualification or relegation
10	Lazio	38	15	5	18	46	55	−9	50	Qualification to Europa League play-off round (Note: Lazio qualified for the play-off round of the 2009–10 UEFA Europa League by winning the 2008–09 Coppa Italia.)
11	Atalanta	38	13	8	17	45	48	−3	47	
12	Napoli	38	12	10	16	43	45	−2	46 (Note: Napoli finished ahead of Sampdoria on head-to-head points: Napoli 2–0 Sampdoria, Sampdoria 2–2 Napoli.)	
13	Sampdoria	38	11	13	14	49	52	−3	46	
14	Siena	38	12	8	18	33	44	−11	44	

Source: lega-calcio.it (in Italian)
Rules for classification: 1) points; 2) head-to-head points; 3) head-to-head goal difference; 4) head-to-head goals scored; 5) goal difference; 6) number of goals scored.

==== Results summary ====
Overall								Home						Away					
Pld	W	D	L	GF	GA	GD	Pts	W	D	L	GF	GA	GD	W	D	L	GF	GA	GD
38	12	10	16	43	45	−2	46	10	5	4	27	16	+11	2	5	12	16	29	−13

Last updated: 31 May 2009.
Source: Competitive matches

==== Results by round ====
Round	1	2	3	4	5	6	7	8	9	10	11	12	13	14	15	16	17	18	19	20	21	22	23	24	25	26	27	28	29	30	31	32	33	34	35	36	37	38
Ground	A	H	A	H	A	A	H	A	H	A	H	A	H	A	H	H	A	H	A	H	A	H	A	H	H	A	H	A	H	A	H	A	H	A	A	H	A	H
Result	D	W	D	W	W	L	W	W	W	L	W	L	D	L	W	W	L	W	L	L	L	D	L	D	L	L	L	D	D	D	D	L	W	L	D	L	L	W
Position	11	5	7	4	2	6	4	3	2	4	3	4	4	4	4	3	5	4	5	5	7	8	8	10	10	11	11	11	11	11	12	14	12	12	13	13	13	12

Updated to match(es) played on 31 May 2009. Source: Competitive matches
A = Away; H = Home; W = Win; D = Draw; L = Loss

==== Matches ====
31 August 2008 1	Roma	1–1	Napoli	Rome
15:00 CEST (UTC+02:00)	Aquilani 29'		Hamšík 56'	Stadium: Stadio Olimpico; Attendance: 38,983; Referee: Nicola Rizzoli

14 September 2008 2	Napoli	2–1	Fiorentina	Naples
15:00 CEST (UTC+02:00)	Hamšík 48'; Maggio 70'		Mutu 40'	Stadium: Stadio San Paolo; Attendance: 26,553; Referee: Paolo Tagliavento

21 September 2008 3	Udinese	0–0	Napoli	Udine
15:00 CEST (UTC+02:00)				Stadium: Stadio Friuli; Attendance: 15,500; Referee: Daniele Orsato

24 September 2008 4	Napoli	2–1	Palermo	Naples
20:30 CEST (UTC+02:00)	Hamšík 14'; Zalayeta 75'		Miccoli 83' (pen.)	Stadium: Stadio San Paolo; Attendance: 30,535; Referee: Gianluca Rocchi

28 September 2008 5	Bologna	0–1	Napoli	Bologna
15:00 CEST (UTC+02:00)			Denis 87'	Stadium: Stadio Renato Dall'Ara; Attendance: 17,743; Referee: Nicola Ayroldi

5 October 2008 6	Genoa	3–2	Napoli	Genoa
15:00 CEST (UTC+02:00)	Sokratis 44'; Palladino 53'; Milito 72'		Lavezzi 2'; Denis 75'	Stadium: Stadio Luigi Ferraris; Attendance: 24,891; Referee: Paolo Dondarini

18 October 2008 7	Napoli	2–1	Juventus	Naples
20:30 CEST (UTC+02:00)	Hamšík 64'; Lavezzi 80'		Amauri 61'	Stadium: Stadio San Paolo; Attendance: 43,710; Referee: Massimiliano Saccani

26 October 2008 8	Lazio	0–1	Napoli	Rome
15:00 CEST (UTC+02:00)			Siviglia 60' (o.g.)	Stadium: Stadio Olimpico; Attendance: 25,500; Referee: Luca Banti

29 October 2008 9	Napoli	3–0	Reggina	Naples
20:30 CEST (UTC+02:00)	Denis 8', 16', 64'			Stadium: Stadio San Paolo; Attendance: 45,438; Referee: Andrea Gervasoni

2 November 2008 10	Milan	1–0	Napoli	Milan
20:30 CET (UTC+01:00)	Ronaldinho 86'			Stadium: San Siro; Attendance: 54,079; Referee: Gianluca Rocchi

9 November 2008 11	Napoli	2–0	Sampdoria	Naples
15:00 CET (UTC+01:00)	Mannini 23'; Zalayeta 74'			Stadium: Stadio San Paolo; Attendance: 47,782; Referee: Roberto Rosetti

16 November 2008 12	Atalanta	3–1	Napoli	Bergamo
15:00 CET (UTC+01:00)	Ferreira Pinto 62'; Manfredini 89'; Floccari 90+1'		Hamšík 73' (pen.)	Stadium: Stadio Atleti Azzurri d'Italia; Attendance: 11,707; Referee: Christian Brighi

23 November 2008 13	Napoli	2–2	Cagliari	Naples
15:00 CET (UTC+01:00)	Hamšík 9'; Lavezzi 84'		D. López 56'; Conti 90+5'	Stadium: Stadio San Paolo; Attendance: 36,516; Referee: Nicola Pierpaoli

30 November 2008 14	Internazionale	2–1	Napoli	Milan
15:00 CET (UTC+01:00)	Córdoba 16'; Muntari 24'		Lavezzi 36'	Stadium: San Siro; Attendance: 45,595; Referee: Roberto Rosetti

7 December 2008 15	Napoli	2–0	Siena	Naples
15:00 CET (UTC+01:00)	Maggio 62'; Denis 72'			Stadium: Stadio San Paolo; Attendance: 36,636; Referee: Antonio Damato

13 December 2008 16	Napoli	3–0	Lecce	Naples
20:30 CET (UTC+01:00)	Hamšík 11' (pen.); Pazienza 42'; Denis 65'			Stadium: Stadio San Paolo; Attendance: 39,657; Referee: Paolo Valeri

21 December 2008 17	Torino	1–0	Napoli	Turin
15:00 CET (UTC+01:00)	Bianchi 53'			Stadium: Stadio Olimpico di Torino; Attendance: 16,537; Referee: Nicola Rizzoli

11 January 2009 18	Napoli	1–0	Catania	Naples
15:00 CET (UTC+01:00)	Maggio 80'			Stadium: Stadio San Paolo; Attendance: 39,930; Referee: Domenico Celi

18 January 2009 19	Chievo	2–1	Napoli	Verona
15:00 CET (UTC+01:00)	Marcolini 32' (pen.), 74' (pen.)		Lavezzi 53'	Stadium: Stadio Marc'Antonio Bentegodi; Attendance: 9,378; Referee: Stefano Farina

25 January 2009 20	Napoli	0–3	Roma	Naples
15:00 CET (UTC+01:00)			Mexès 18'; Juan 32'; Vučinić 50'	Stadium: Stadio San Paolo; Attendance: 60,241; Referee: Emidio Morganti

28 January 2009 21	Fiorentina	2–1	Napoli	Florence
20:30 CET (UTC+01:00)	Santana 47'; Montolivo 77'		Vitale 49'	Stadium: Stadio Artemio Franchi; Attendance: 28,863; Referee: Nicola Rizzoli

31 January 2009 22	Napoli	2–2	Udinese	Naples
18:15 CET (UTC+01:00)	Hamšík 24'; Lavezzi 27'		Di Natale 32' (pen.); Quagliarella 45'	Stadium: Stadio San Paolo; Attendance: 37,204; Referee: Andrea Gervasoni

8 February 2009 23	Palermo	2–1	Napoli	Palermo
20:30 CET (UTC+01:00)	Migliaccio 2'; F. Simplício 14'		Hamšík 43'	Stadium: Stadio Renzo Barbera; Attendance: 20,185; Referee: Massimiliano Saccani

14 February 2009 24	Napoli	1–1	Bologna	Naples
20:30 CET (UTC+01:00)	Maggio 19'		Di Vaio 23'	Stadium: Stadio San Paolo; Attendance: 34,413; Referee: Luca Banti

22 February 2009 25	Napoli	0–1	Genoa	Naples
15:00 CET (UTC+01:00)			Janković 69'	Stadium: Stadio San Paolo; Attendance: 39,284; Referee: Daniele Orsato

28 February 2009 26	Juventus	1–0	Napoli	Turin
20:30 CET (UTC+01:00)	Marchisio 44'			Stadium: Stadio Olimpico di Torino; Attendance: 20,700; Referee: Nicola Ayroldi

8 March 2009 27	Napoli	0–2	Lazio	Naples
15:00 CET (UTC+01:00)			Rocchi 57', 65'	Stadium: Stadio San Paolo; Attendance: 33,119; Referee: Massimiliano Saccani

15 March 2009 28	Reggina	1–1	Napoli	Reggio Calabria
15:00 CET (UTC+01:00)	Corradi 27'		Lavezzi 64'	Stadium: Stadio Oreste Granillo; Attendance: 10,027; Referee: Matteo Trefoloni

22 March 2009 29	Napoli	0–0	Milan	Naples
20:30 CET (UTC+01:00)				Stadium: Stadio San Paolo; Attendance: 57,966; Referee: Andrea De Marco

5 April 2009 30	Sampdoria	2–2	Napoli	Genoa
15:00 CEST (UTC+02:00)	Palombo 28', 63'		Zalayeta 44'; Denis 90+2'	Stadium: Stadio Luigi Ferraris; Attendance: 21,644; Referee: Paolo Tagliavento

11 April 2009 31	Napoli	0–0	Atalanta	Naples
15:00 CEST (UTC+02:00)				Stadium: Stadio San Paolo; Attendance: 36,773; Referee: Dino Tommasi

19 April 2009 32	Cagliari	2–0	Napoli	Cagliari
15:00 CEST (UTC+02:00)	Jeda 5'; Lazzari 90+2'			Stadium: Stadio Sant'Elia; Attendance: 13,000; Referee: Domenico Celi

26 April 2009 33	Napoli	1–0	Internazionale	Naples
20:30 CEST (UTC+02:00)	Zalayeta 73'			Stadium: Stadio San Paolo; Attendance: 53,772; Referee: Roberto Rosetti

3 May 2009 34	Siena	2–1	Napoli	Siena
15:00 CEST (UTC+02:00)	Kharja 11'; Maccarone 25'		Piá 80'	Stadium: Stadio Artemio Franchi – Montepaschi Arena; Attendance: 9,842; Referee: Nicola Ayroldi

10 May 2009 35	Lecce	1–1	Napoli	Lecce
15:00 CEST (UTC+02:00)	Zanchetta 44' (pen.)		Piá 33'	Stadium: Stadio Via del Mare; Attendance: 14,511; Referee: Nicola Pierpaoli

17 May 2009 36	Napoli	1–2	Torino	Naples
15:00 CEST (UTC+02:00)	Piá 42'		Bianchi 51'; Rosina 72'	Stadium: Stadio San Paolo; Attendance: 30,091; Referee: Antonio Damato

24 May 2009 37	Catania	3–1	Napoli	Catania
15:00 CEST (UTC+02:00)	Morimoto 42'; Mascara 88'; Falconieri 90+1'		Bogliacino 28'	Stadium: Stadio Angelo Massimino; Attendance: 17,408; Referee: Leonardo Baracani

31 May 2009 38	Napoli	3–0	Chievo	Naples
15:00 CEST (UTC+02:00)	Montervino 4'; Bogliacino 7'; Piá 18'			Stadium: Stadio San Paolo; Attendance: 27,423; Referee: Renzo Candussio

=== Coppa Italia ===
12 November 2008 Round of 16	Napoli	3–1	Salernitana	Naples
21:00 CET	Peccarisi 16' (o.g.); Piá 25'; Hamšík 53' (pen.)		Di Napoli 33'	Stadium: Stadio San Paolo; Attendance: 19,459; Referee: Andrea De Marco

4 February 2009 Quarter-finals	Juventus	0–0 (a.e.t.) (4–3 p)	Napoli	Turin
20:45 CET				Stadium: Stadio Olimpico di Torino; Attendance: 13,525; Referee: Nicola Ayroldi
	Penalties
	Del Piero (penalty scored); Trezeguet (penalty scored); Nedvěd (penalty missed); Marchionni (penalty scored); Sissoko (penalty missed); Legrottaglie (penalty scored)		(penalty scored) Hamšík; (penalty scored) Bogliacino; (penalty scored) Denis; (penalty missed) Lavezzi; (penalty missed) Contini; (penalty missed) Gargano

=== UEFA Intertoto Cup ===
20 July 2008 First leg	Panionios (Greece)	0–1	(Italy) Napoli	Athens, Greece
18:00 CEST (UTC+02:00)			Bogliacino 31'	Stadium: Nea Smyrni Stadium; Attendance: 3,125; Referee: Duarte Gomes (Portugal)

26 July 2008 Second leg	Napoli (Italy)	1–0 (2–0 agg.)	(Greece) Panionios	Naples, Italy
21:00 CEST (UTC+02:00)	Hamšík 65'			Stadium: Stadio San Paolo; Attendance: 54,137; Referee: César Muñiz Fernández (Spain)

=== UEFA Cup ===
==== Second qualifying round ====
14 August 2008 First leg	Vllaznia (Albania)	0–3	(Italy) Napoli	Shkodër, Albania
20:30 CEST (UTC+02:00)		Report	Piá 28', 47'; Denis 75'	Stadium: Loro Boriçi Stadium; Attendance: 11,200; Referee: Stanislav Sukhina (Russia)

28 August 2008 Second leg	Napoli (Italy)	5–0 (8–0 agg.)	(Albania) Vllaznia	Naples, Italy
21:00 CEST (UTC+02:00)	Rinaudo 42', 54'; Piá 52'; Lavezzi 80'; Hamšík 87'	Report		Stadium: Stadio San Paolo; Attendance: 21,550; Referee: Fırat Aydınus (Turkey)

==== First round ====
18 September 2008 First leg	Napoli (Italy)	3–2	(Portugal) Benfica	Naples, Italy
21:00 CEST (UTC+02:00)	Vitale 18'; Denis 19'; Maggio 54'	Report	Suazo 16'; Luisão 59'	Stadium: Stadio San Paolo; Attendance: 51,597; Referee: Björn Kuipers (Netherlands)

2 October 2008 Second leg	Benfica (Portugal)	2–0 (4–3 agg.)	(Italy) Napoli	Lisbon, Portugal
21:15 CEST (UTC+02:00)	Reyes 57'; Gomes 84'	Report		Stadium: Estádio da Luz; Attendance: 56,500; Referee: Wolfgang Stark (Germany)

== Transfers ==
=== In ===
Pos.	Player	From	Fee
FW	(Argentina) Germán Denis	Independiente	€6.3M
DF	(Italy) Leandro Rinaudo	Palermo	€4.8M
MF	(Italy) Christian Maggio	Sampdoria	€12.1M
FW	(Italy) Andrea Russotto	Bellinzona	Loan
DF	(Italy) Salvatore Aronica	Reggina	undisclosed
MF	(Argentina) Jesús Dátolo	Boca Juniors	€8M

=== Out ===
Pos.	Player	To	Fee
MF	(Argentina) Roberto Sosa	Gimnasia	Free
DF	(Austria) György Garics	Atalanta	Co-ownership, Undisclosed
DF	(Italy) Andrea Cupi	Empoli	Free
DF	(Italy) Tommaso Romito	Pescara	Co-ownership, Undisclosed
FW	(Italy) Emanuele Calaiò	Siena	Co-ownership, Undisclosed
DF	(Italy) Maurizio Domizzi	Udinese	Co-ownership, Undisclosed

=== Players out on loan ===
Pos.	Player	On loan to
FW	(Italy) Christian Bucchi	Ascoli
DF	(Italy) Erminio Rullo	Triestina

== Squad statistics ==
=== Appearances and goals ===
Last updated on 30 May 2009

No.	Pos	Nat	Player	Total		Serie A		UEFA Intertoto Cup		UEFA Cup		Coppa Italia	
No.	Pos	Nat	Player	Apps	Goals	Apps	Goals	Apps	Goals	Apps	Goals	Apps	Goals
1	GK	(Italy) ITA	Gennaro Iezzo	16	0	14	0	2	0	0	0	0	0
2	DF	(Italy) ITA	Gianluca Grava	9	0	5+1	0	1	0	1	0	1	0
3	MF	(Italy) ITA	Luigi Vitale	23	2	17+1	1	2	0	2	1	0+1	0
4	MF	(Italy) ITA	Francesco Montervino	16	1	6+7	1	0	0	1	0	2	0
5	MF	(Italy) ITA	Michele Pazienza	36	1	18+11	1	0+2	0	2+1	0	2	0
6	DF	(Italy) ITA	Salvatore Aronica	25	0	15+8	0	0	0	0	0	2	0
7	FW	(Argentina) ARG	Ezequiel Lavezzi	34	8	29+1	7	0	0	2+1	1	1	0
8	MF	(Italy) ITA	Manuele Blasi	36	0	31+1	0	2	0	2	0	0	0
9	FW	(Argentina) ARG	Germán Denis	40	9	22+12	8	2	0	1+2	1	0+1	0
11	MF	(Italy) ITA	Christian Maggio	28	5	22+1	4	2	0	2	1	0+1	0
12	FW	(Brazil) BRA	Piá	20	6	8+7	4	0+2	0	1+1	1	1	1
13	DF	(Italy) ITA	Fabiano Santacroce	30	0	27	0	0	0	2	0	1	0
15	MF	(Argentina) ARG	Jesús Dátolo	9	0	3+6	0	0	0	0	0	0	0
17	MF	(Slovakia) SVK	Marek Hamšík	39	12	31+1	9	2	1	2+1	1	2	1
18	MF	(Uruguay) URU	Mariano Bogliacino	19	3	8+7	2	2	1	0	0	0+2	0
19	DF	(Italy) ITA	Mirko Savini	0	0	0	0	0	0	0	0	0	0
20	MF	(Italy) ITA	Andrea Russotto	17	0	0+15	0	0	0	0+1	0	0+1	0
22	GK	(Italy) ITA	Matteo Gianello	8	0	5+1	0	0	0	2	0	0	0
23	MF	(Uruguay) URU	Walter Gargano	33	0	23+3	0	2	0	3	0	2	0
24	MF	(Italy) ITA	Samuele Dalla Bona	0	0	0	0	0	0	0	0	0	0
25	FW	(Uruguay) URU	Marcelo Zalayeta	32	4	17+10	4	0	0	2+1	0	2	0
28	DF	(Italy) ITA	Paolo Cannavaro	36	0	30	0	2	0	3	0	1	0
30	GK	(Argentina) ARG	Nicolás Navarro	22	0	18+1	0	0	0	1	0	2	0
32	MF	(Uruguay) URU	Nicolás Amodio	3	0	0+3	0	0	0	0	0	0	0
44	GK	(Italy) ITA	Luigi Sepe	1	0	0+1	0	0	0	0	0	0	0
70	GK	(Italy) ITA	Luca Bucci	1	0	1	0	0	0	0	0	0	0
77	MF	(Italy) ITA	Daniele Mannini	26	0	21+3	0	0	0	0+1	0	1	0
83	MF	(Italy) ITA	Leandro Rinaudo	21	0	13+4	0	1	0	2	0	1	0
96	DF	(Italy) ITA	Matteo Contini	40	0	31+3	0	2	0	3	0	1	0

=== Disciplinary record ===
Disciplinary records for 2008–09 league and cup matches. Players with 1 card or more included only.

No.	Nat.	Player	Yellow cards	Red cards
2	(Italy)	Luigi Vitale	2	0
4	(Italy)	Francesco Montervino	1	0
5	(Italy)	Michele Pazienza	1	0
6	(Italy)	Salvatore Aronica	2	0
8	(Italy)	Manuele Blasi	2	0
9	(Argentina)	Germán Denis	1	0
13	(Italy)	Fabiano Santacroce	3	2
28	(Italy)	Paolo Cannavaro	1	0

=== Starting 11 ===
No.	Pos.	Nat.	Name	MS	Notes
30	GK	(Argentina)	Navarro	21	
13	CB	(Italy)	Santacroce	30	
28	CB	(Italy)	Cannavaro	36	
96	CB	(Italy)	Contini	36	
11	RWB	(Italy)	Maggio	26	
8	CM	(Italy)	Blasi	35	
23	CM	(Uruguay)	Gargano	30	
17	CM	(Slovakia)	Hamšík	37	
77	LWB	(Italy)	Mannini	22	
7	ST	(Argentina)	Lavezzi	32	
9	CF	(Argentina)	Denis	25	

Last updated: 31 May 2009
Source: Squad statistics and Start formations
Only competitive matches.
Using the most used start formation.
Ordered by position on pitch (from back right to front left).
