= 2007–08 SSC Napoli season =

Napoli
2007–08 season
- Chairman: Aurelio De Laurentiis
- Manager: Edoardo Reja
- Stadium: Stadio San Paolo
- Serie A: 8th (in Intertoto Cup)
- Coppa Italia: Round of 16
- Top goalscorer: League: Marek Hamšík (9); All: Ezequiel Lavezzi (11); Maurizio Domizzi (11)
- Highest home attendance: 59,272 vs Roma (9 March 2008)
- Lowest home attendance: 31,344 vs Catania (25 November 2007)
- Average home league attendance: 43,046
Home colours	Away colours	Third colours

SSC Napoli returned to Serie A with a stable funding from Aurelio De Laurentiis and a couple of exciting new signings in Marek Hamšík and Ezequiel Lavezzi. With those two quality players in the squad, Napoli was a reliable force, finishing 8th in the standings. Another surprising performer was defensive general Maurizio Domizzi, who scored 11 goals in all competitions, becoming the club's tied top scorer with Lavezzi.

== Squad ==
Note: Flags indicate national team as defined under FIFA eligibility rules; some limited exceptions apply. Players may hold more than one non-FIFA nationality.

No.	Pos.	Nation	Player
1	GK	(Italy) ITA	Gennaro Iezzo
2	DF	(Italy) ITA	Gianluca Grava
3	DF	(Italy) ITA	Erminio Rullo
4	MF	(Italy) ITA	Francesco Montervino
5	MF	(Italy) ITA	Michele Pazienza
5	MF	(Italy) ITA	Fabio Gatti
6	DF	(Paraguay) PAR	Rubén Maldonado
7	FW	(Argentina) ARG	Ezequiel Lavezzi
8	MF	(Italy) ITA	Manuele Blasi
9	FW	(Argentina) ARG	Roberto Sosa
11	FW	(Italy) ITA	Emanuele Calaiò
12	GK	(Italy) ITA	Biagio Del Giudice
13	DF	(Italy) ITA	Fabiano Santacroce
14	DF	(Austria) AUT	György Garics
16	DF	(Italy) ITA	Andrea Cupi

No.	Pos.	Nation	Player
17	MF	(Slovakia) SVK	Marek Hamšík
18	MF	(Uruguay) URU	Mariano Bogliacino
19	DF	(Italy) ITA	Mirko Savini
20	FW	(Italy) ITA	Roberto De Zerbi
21	DF	(Italy) ITA	Maurizio Domizzi
22	GK	(Italy) ITA	Matteo Gianello
23	MF	(Uruguay) URU	Walter Gargano
24	MF	(Italy) ITA	Samuele Dalla Bona
25	FW	(Uruguay) URU	Marcelo Zalayeta
27	MF	(Italy) ITA	Marco Capparella
28	DF	(Italy) ITA	Paolo Cannavaro (captain)
30	GK	(Argentina) ARG	Nicolás Navarro
77	MF	(Italy) ITA	Daniele Mannini
96	DF	(Italy) ITA	Matteo Contini

== Competitions ==
=== Serie A ===
==== League table ====
Pos	Team	Pld	W	D	L	GF	GA	GD	Pts	Qualification or relegation
6	Sampdoria	38	17	9	12	56	46	+10	60	Qualification to UEFA Cup first round (Note: The 7th-placed team qualified for the UEFA Cup due to both of the Coppa Italia finalists, Roma and Internazionale, finishing 6th or higher.)
7	Udinese	38	16	9	13	48	53	−5	57	Qualification to UEFA Cup first round
8	Napoli	38	14	8	16	50	53	−3	50	Qualification to Intertoto Cup third round
9	Atalanta	38	12	12	14	52	56	−4	48 (Note: Atalanta finished ahead of Genoa on head-to-head points: Genoa 2-1 Atalanta, Atalanta 2-0 Genoa.)	
10	Genoa	38	13	9	16	44	52	−8	48	

Source: Serie A
Rules for classification: 1) points; 2) head-to-head points; 3) head-to-head goal difference; 4) head-to-head goals scored; 5) goal difference; 6) number of goals scored.

==== Results summary ====
Overall								Home						Away					
Pld	W	D	L	GF	GA	GD	Pts	W	D	L	GF	GA	GD	W	D	L	GF	GA	GD
38	14	8	16	50	53	−3	50	11	4	4	27	16	+11	3	4	12	23	37	−14

Last updated: 18 May 2008.
Source: Competitive matches

==== Results by round ====
Round	1	2	3	4	5	6	7	8	9	10	11	12	13	14	15	16	17	18	19	20	21	22	23	24	25	26	27	28	29	30	31	32	33	34	35	36	37	38
Ground	H	A	H	A	H	H	A	A	H	A	H	A	H	A	H	A	H	A	H	A	H	A	H	A	A	H	H	A	H	A	H	A	H	A	H	A	H	A
Result	L	W	W	D	W	L	D	L	W	L	D	L	W	L	W	D	D	L	D	L	W	L	L	W	L	W	L	L	W	D	W	L	W	W	D	L	W	L
Position	16	8	3	5	4	5	9	8	6	7	7	9	7	9	8	9	8	10	11	11	11	11	11	11	11	11	12	12	10	11	10	10	9	9	9	9	8	8

Updated to match(es) played on 18 May 2008. Source: Competitive matches
A = Away; H = Home; W = Win; D = Draw; L = Loss

==== Matches ====
26 August 2007 1	Napoli	0–2	Cagliari	Naples
15:00 CEST (UTC+02:00)			Matri 49'; Foggia 59' (pen.)	Stadium: Stadio San Paolo; Attendance: 39,026; Referee: Mauro Bergonzi

2 September 2007 2	Udinese	0–5	Napoli	Udine
15:00 CEST (UTC+02:00)			Zalayeta 16', 70'; Domizzi 41'; Lavezzi 75'; Sosa 81'	Stadium: Stadio Friuli; Attendance: 16,197; Referee: Andrea Gervasoni

16 September 2007 3	Napoli	2–0	Sampdoria	Naples
15:00 CEST (UTC+02:00)	Zalayeta 43'; Hamšík 77'			Stadium: Stadio San Paolo; Attendance: 43,490; Referee: Gabriele Gava

23 September 2007 4	Empoli	0–0	Napoli	Empoli
15:00 CEST (UTC+02:00)				Stadium: Stadio Carlo Castellani; Attendance: 11,985; Referee: Nicola Rizzoli

26 September 2007 5	Napoli	1–0	Livorno	Naples
20:30 CEST (UTC+02:00)	Sosa 85'			Stadium: Stadio San Paolo; Attendance: 37,203; Referee: Emidio Morganti

30 September 2007 6	Napoli	1–2	Genoa	Naples
15:00 CEST (UTC+02:00)	Domizzi 52'		P. Cannavaro 12' (o.g.); Sculli 89'	Stadium: Stadio San Paolo; Attendance: 0 Referee: Nicola Pierpaoli

6 October 2007 7	Internazionale	2–1	Napoli	Milan
20:30 CEST (UTC+02:00)	J. Cruz 20', 36'		Sosa 85'	Stadium: San Siro; Attendance: 46,536; Referee: Roberto Rosetti

20 October 2007 8	Roma	4–4	Napoli	Rome
18:00 CEST (UTC+02:00)	Totti 30'; Perrotta 42'; De Rossi 52'; Pizarro 80'		Lavezzi 2'; Hamšík 47'; Gargano 64'; Zalayeta 84'	Stadium: Stadio Olimpico; Attendance: 27,313; Referee: Paolo Tagliavento

27 October 2007 9	Napoli	3–1	Juventus	Naples
20:30 CEST (UTC+02:00)	Gargano 49'; Domizzi 62' (pen.), 70' (pen.)		Del Piero 46'	Stadium: Stadio San Paolo; Attendance: 56,022; Referee: Mauro Bergonzi

31 October 2007 10	Fiorentina	1–0	Napoli	Florence
20:30 CET (UTC+01:00)	Vieri 61'			Stadium: Stadio Artemio Franchi; Attendance: 32,658; Referee: Gabriele Gava

4 November 2007 11	Napoli	1–1	Reggina	Naples
15:00 CET (UTC+01:00)	Lavezzi 89'		Vigiani 54'	Stadium: Stadio San Paolo; Attendance: 34,490; Referee: Nicola Rizzoli

10 November 2007 12	Palermo	2–1	Napoli	Palermo
20:30 CET (UTC+01:00)	Tedesco 57', 66'		Gargano 54'	Stadium: Stadio Renzo Barbera; Attendance: 25,138; Referee: Roberto Rosetti

25 November 2007 13	Napoli	2–0	Catania	Naples
15:00 CET (UTC+01:00)	Zalayeta 43', 65'			Stadium: Stadio San Paolo; Attendance: 31,344; Referee: Christian Brighi

2 December 2007 14	Atalanta	5–1	Napoli	Bergamo
15:00 CET (UTC+01:00)	Floccari 6'; Langella 21'; Doni 36'; Carrozzieri 47'; Ferreira Pinto 73'		Sosa 60'	Stadium: Stadio Atleti Azzurri d'Italia; Attendance: 6,388; Referee: Andrea Gervasoni

9 December 2007 15	Napoli	1–0	Parma	Naples
15:00 CET (UTC+01:00)	Zalayeta 18'			Stadium: Stadio San Paolo; Attendance: 35,349; Referee: Gianluca Rocchi

16 December 2007 16	Siena	1–1	Napoli	Siena
15:00 CET (UTC+01:00)	Frick 63'		Bogliacino 65'	Stadium: Stadio Artemio Franchi; Attendance: 10,686; Referee: Paolo Mazzoleni

23 December 2007 17	Napoli	1–1	Torino	Naples
15:00 CET (UTC+01:00)	Hamšík 81'		Rosina 36' (pen.)	Stadium: Stadio San Paolo; Attendance: 40,795; Referee: Matteo Trefoloni

13 January 2008 18	Milan	5–2	Napoli	Milan
20:30 CET (UTC+01:00)	Ronaldo 15', 46'; Seedorf 31'; Kaká 68'; Pato 74'		Sosa 28'; Domizzi 38' (pen.)	Stadium: San Siro; Attendance: 70,085; Referee: Roberto Rosetti

20 January 2008 19	Napoli	2–2	Lazio	Naples
15:00 CET (UTC+01:00)	Hamšík 5', 90+4'		Ledesma 26'; Pandev 31'	Stadium: Stadio San Paolo; Attendance: 34,480; Referee: Gianluca Rocchi

27 January 2008 20	Cagliari	2–1	Napoli	Cagliari
15:00 CET (UTC+01:00)	Matri 90+3'; Conti 90 + 5'		Hamšík 58'	Stadium: Stadio Sant'Elia; Attendance: 12,000; Referee: Luca Banti

2 February 2008 21	Napoli	3–1	Udinese	Naples
20:30 CET (UTC+01:00)	Zapata 3' (o.g.); Lavezzi 74', 75'		Pepe 9'	Stadium: Stadio San Paolo; Attendance: 36,034; Referee: Nicola Ayroldi

10 February 2008 22	Sampdoria	2–0	Napoli	Genoa
15:00 CET (UTC+01:00)	G. Delvecchio 76'; Franceschini 82'			Stadium: Stadio Luigi Ferraris; Attendance: 43,490; Referee: Gabriele Gava

17 February 2008 23	Napoli	1–3	Empoli	Naples
15:00 CET (UTC+01:00)	Mannini 37'		Pozzi 22', 66'; Budel 81'	Stadium: Stadio San Paolo; Attendance: 46,946; Referee: Paolo Mazzoleni

24 February 2008 24	Livorno	1–2	Napoli	Livorno
15:00 CET (UTC+01:00)	Diamanti 74'		Calaiò 12', 45+3'	Stadium: Stadio Armando Picchi; Attendance: 8,495; Referee: Massimiliano Saccani

27 February 2008 25	Genoa	2–0	Napoli	Genoa
20:30 CET (UTC+01:00)	Sculli 41'; Borriello 75' (pen.)			Stadium: Stadio Luigi Ferraris; Attendance: 26,417; Referee: Andrea Gervasoni

2 March 2008 26	Napoli	1–0	Internazionale	Naples
20:30 CET (UTC+01:00)	Zalayeta 3'			Stadium: Stadio San Paolo; Attendance: 53,818; Referee: Nicola Rizzoli

9 March 2008 27	Napoli	0–2	Roma	Naples
15:00 CET (UTC+01:00)			Perrotta 2'; Totti 45' (pen.)	Stadium: Stadio San Paolo; Attendance: 59,272; Referee: Massimiliano Saccani

16 March 2008 28	Juventus	1–0	Napoli	Turin
20:30 CET (UTC+01:00)	Iaquinta 88'			Stadium: Stadio Olimpico di Torino; Attendance: 21,095; Referee: Gianluca Rocchi

19 March 2008 29	Napoli	2–0	Fiorentina	Naples
20:30 CET (UTC+01:00)	Lavezzi 23', 31'			Stadium: Stadio San Paolo; Attendance: 42,661; Referee: Roberto Rosetti

22 March 2008 30	Reggina	1–1	Napoli	Reggio Calabria
15:00 CET (UTC+01:00)	Brienza 90+3'		Sosa 76'	Stadium: Stadio Oreste Granillo; Attendance: 12,383; Referee: Antonio Damato

30 March 2008 31	Napoli	1–0	Palermo	Naples
20:30 CEST (UTC+02:00)	Hamšík 90+2'			Stadium: Stadio San Paolo; Attendance: 49,341; Referee: Luca Banti

6 April 2008 32	Catania	3–0	Napoli	Catania
15:00 CEST (UTC+02:00)	L. Colucci 5'; Spinesi 16'; Vargas 48'			Stadium: Stadio Angelo Massimino; Attendance: 18,206; Referee: Daniele Orsato

13 April 2008 33	Napoli	2–0	Atalanta	Naples
15:00 CEST (UTC+02:00)	Hamšík 62'; Lavezzi 64'			Stadium: Stadio San Paolo; Attendance: 38,688; Referee: Maurizio Ciampi

20 April 2008 34	Parma	1–2	Napoli	Parma
15:00 CEST (UTC+02:00)	Budan 23' (pen.)		Domizzi 45+3'; Bogliacino 72'	Stadium: Stadio Ennio Tardini; Attendance: 17,996; Referee: Nicola Ayroldi

27 April 2008 35	Napoli	0–0	Siena	Naples
15:00 CEST (UTC+02:00)				Stadium: Stadio San Paolo; Attendance: 39,086; Referee: Antonio Giannoccaro

4 May 2008 36	Torino	2–1	Napoli	Turin
15:00 CEST (UTC+02:00)	Rosina 27' (pen.); Di Michele 56'		Contini 53'	Stadium: Stadio Olimpico di Torino; Attendance: 21,112; Referee: Andrea De Marco

11 May 2008 37	Napoli	3–1	Milan	Naples
15:00 CEST (UTC+02:00)	Hamšík 36'; Domizzi 69'; Garics 90+2'		Seedorf 90+4'	Stadium: Stadio San Paolo; Attendance: 55,874; Referee: Stefano Farina

18 May 2008 38	Lazio	2–1	Napoli	Rome
15:00 CEST (UTC+02:00)	Rocchi 14'; Firmani 71'		Domizzi 83'	Stadium: Stadio Olimpico; Attendance: 14,939; Referee: Massimiliano Velotto

=== Coppa Italia ===
15 August 2007 First elim. round	Napoli	4–0	Siena	Naples
20:30 CEST	Calaiò 20'; Hamšík 40'; De Zerbi 75'; Domizzi 90'	Report		Stadium: Stadio San Paolo; Attendance: 19,882; Referee: Massimiliano Velotto

18 August 2007 Second elim. round	Napoli	3–1 (a.e.t.)	Pisa	Naples
20:30 CET	Lavezzi 50', 103', 119'		Kutuzov 19'	Stadium: Stadio San Paolo; Attendance: 24,416; Referee: Riccardo Pinzani

29 August 2007 Third elim. round	Napoli	1–1 (a.e.t.) (3–2 p)	Livorno	Naples
20:30 CET	Domizzi 24'		Tavano 82'	Stadium: Stadio San Paolo; Attendance: 25,000; Referee: Domenico Celi
	Penalties
	Domizzi (penalty scored); Calaiò (penalty scored); Dalla Bona (penalty missed); Gargano (penalty scored)		(penalty missed) Diamanti; (penalty scored) Rossini; (penalty scored) Loviso; (penalty missed) Balleri; (penalty missed) Tavano

19 December 2007 Round of 16; First leg	Lazio	2–1	Napoli	Rome
20:45 CET	De Silvestri 66'; Baronio 71'		Dalla Bona 28'	Stadium: Stadio Olimpico; Attendance: 5,506; Referee: Nicola Stefanini

17 January 2008 Round of 16; Second leg	Napoli	1–1	Lazio	Naples
20:45 CET	Domizzi 79'		Tare 55'	Stadium: Stadio San Paolo; Attendance: 29,564; Referee: Paolo Mazzoleni

== Statistics ==
=== Top scorers ===
Includes all competitive matches.

Rnk	Pos	Nat	Name	Serie A	Coppa Italia	Total
1	FW	(Argentina)	Ezequiel Lavezzi	8	3	11
=	DF	(Italy)	Maurizio Domizzi	8	3	11
2	MF	(Slovakia)	Marek Hamšík	9	1	10
3	FW	(Uruguay)	Marcelo Zalayeta	8	0	8
4	FW	(Argentina)	Roberto Sosa	6	0	6
5	MF	(Uruguay)	Mariano Bogliacino	3	0	3
=	FW	(Italy)	Emanuele Calaiò	2	1	3
6	MF	(Uruguay)	Walter Gargano	2	0	2
7	FW	(Italy)	Roberto De Zerbi	0	1	1
=	MF	(Italy)	Daniele Mannini	1	0	1
=	MF	(Italy)	Samuele Dalla Bona	0	1	1
=	DF	(Italy)	Paolo Cannavaro	1	0	1
=	DF	(Italy)	Matteo Contini	1	0	1
=	DF	(Austria)	György Garics	1	0	1
			TOTALS	50	13	63

Last updated: 18 May 2008

=== Starting 11 ===
No.	Pos.	Nat.	Name	MS	Notes
1	GK	(Italy)	Iezzo	20	
21	CB	(Italy)	Domizzi	33	
28	CB	(Italy)	Cannavaro	39	
96	CB	(Italy)	Contini	25	
14	RWB	(Austria)	Garics	18	
8	CM	(Italy)	Blasi	30	
23	CM	(Uruguay)	Gargano	37	
17	CM	(Slovakia)	Hamšík	35	
19	LWB	(Italy)	Savini	30	
7	ST	(Argentina)	Lavezzi	35	
25	CF	(Uruguay)	Zalayeta	23	

Last updated: 18 May 2008
Source: Squad statistics and Start formations
Only competitive matches.
Using the most used start formation.
Ordered by position on pitch (from back right to front left).

== Sources ==
- RSSSF - Italy 2007/08
