= Birra Moretti Trophy =

Italian association football friendly tournament

- Founded: 1997
- Abolished: 2008
- Region: Italy
- Teams: 3
- Last champions: Juventus
- Most championships: Juventus (6 titles)

The Trofeo Birra Moretti (Birra Moretti Trophy) was an annual football friendly tournament that had been organised and sponsored by Birra Moretti from 1997 to 2008. The teams played three round-robin matches lasting 45-minutes each. If any match ended in a draw, it was decided by shoot-outs or penalties (as in 2008 edition).

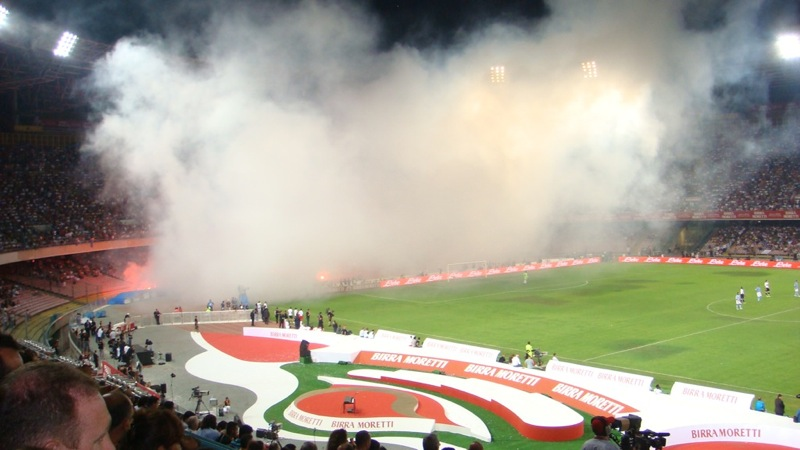
The stage of the awards ceremony at San Paolo in Naples during the 2007 edition.

After 2008, the event has not taken place anymore. Officially, Heineken Italia announced its intention to suspend it for only one year in 2009, coinciding with a change of promotional strategies at the 150th anniversary of Beer Moretti S.p.A., but was not resumed even in the following years.

== Formula ==
The tournament was played in 3 matches, each of 45 minutes (plus any recovery): the loser of the first match challenged the third team, later engaged against the winner of the opening match. In most of the editions, the matches were divided into 2 halves (from 22 min 30 s each) to give kickoff to each formation: the interval was also useful to the organizers for promotional and advertising purposes. If after 45 minutes, the match was tied, there was a shoot-out (penalty in motion) with 3 executions per team and possible continuation to the bitter end. Penalty shots. The score was thus assigned:

- 3 points for victory in the 45 minutes
- 2 points for winning on penalties
- 1 point for losing on penalties
- no points for the defeat in the 45 minutes

For tie situations in the standings, the goal difference first and the detached standings were considered first. Only the goals of the 45 minutes were counted in the goal difference.

== Winners ==
- 1997: Juventus
- 1998: Udinese
- 1999: Parma
- 2000: Juventus
- 2001: Internazionale
- 2002: Internazionale
- 2003: Juventus
- 2004: Juventus
- 2005: Napoli
- 2006: Juventus
- 2007: Internazionale
- 2008: Juventus

== Editions ==
=== 2003 ===
- 3 points for win, 0 points for loss
- 2 points for shoot-out win, 1 point for shoot-out loss
- Juventus F.C. wins tournament

Team	Pld	W	SOW	SOL	L	GF	GA	GD	Pts
Juventus	2	1	1	0	0	3	2	+1	5
Sampdoria	2	0	1	1	0	2	2	0	3
Internazionale	2	0	0	1	1	2	3	−1	1

8 August 2003	Juventus (Italy)	2 – 1	(Italy) Internazionale	Stadio San Nicola, Bari
20:30 CEST	Camoranesi 7'; Di Vaio 16'		34' Crespo	Referee: (Italy) Tiziano Pieri

8 August 2003	Sampdoria (Italy)	1 – 1 (1 – 0 p)	(Italy) Internazionale	Stadio San Nicola, Bari
21:30 CEST	Bazzani 18'		7' Martins	Referee: (Italy) Marco Gabriele
	Penalties
	Yanagisawa (penalty missed); Job (penalty scored)		(penalty missed) Kallon; (penalty missed) Martins; (penalty missed) Luciano

8 August 2003	Sampdoria (Italy)	1 – 1 (3 – 4 p)	(Italy) Juventus	Stadio San Nicola, Bari
22:30 CEST	Pedone 1'		4' Di Vaio	Referee: (Italy) Nicola Ayroldi
	Penalties
			(penalty missed) Appiah; (penalty scored) Maresca; (penalty scored) Olivera; (penalty scored) Miccoli; (penalty scored) Fresi

=== 2004 ===
- 3 points for win, 0 points for loss
- 2 points for shoot-out win, 1 point for shoot-out loss
- Juventus F.C. wins tournament

Team	Pld	W	SOW	SOL	L	GF	GA	GD	Pts
Juventus	2	1	1	0	0	1	0	+1	5
Palermo	2	1	0	1	0	2	1	+1	4
Internazionale	2	0	0	0	2	1	3	−2	0

4 August 2004	Juventus (Italy)	1 – 0	(Italy) Internazionale	Stadio San Nicola, Bari
20:30 CEST	Trezeguet 7'			Attendance: 60,000; Referee: (Italy) Gianluca Paparesta

4 August 2004	Palermo (Italy)	2 – 1	(Italy) Internazionale	Stadio San Nicola, Bari
21:30 CEST	Morrone 30'; Toni 43'		44' Ventola	Attendance: 60,000; Referee: (Italy) Nicola Ayroldi

4 August 2004	Palermo (Italy)	0 – 0 (1 – 2 p)	(Italy) Juventus	Stadio San Nicola, Bari
22:30 CEST				Attendance: 60,000; Referee: (Italy) Tiziano Pieri
	Penalties
	Ferri (penalty missed); E. Filippini (penalty missed); Farías (penalty scored)		(penalty missed) Baiocco; (penalty scored) Olivera; (penalty scored) Miccoli

=== 2005 ===
- 3 points for win, 0 points for loss
- 2 points for shoot-out win, 1 point for shoot-out loss
- S.S.C. Napoli wins tournament

Team	Pld	W	SOW	SOL	L	GF	GA	GD	Pts
Napoli	2	1	1	0	0	3	2	+1	5
Juventus	2	1	0	1	0	3	1	+2	4
Internazionale	2	0	0	0	2	1	4	−3	0

12 August 2005	Juventus (Italy)	2 – 0	(Italy) Internazionale	Stadio San Paolo, Naples
20:30 CEST	Ibrahimović 1', 9'	Report		Attendance: 40,000; Referee: (Italy) Matteo Trefoloni

12 August 2005	Napoli (Italy)	2 – 1	(Italy) Internazionale	Stadio San Paolo, Naples
21:30 CEST	Bogliacino 13'; Piá 23'	Report	22' (pen.) Recoba	Attendance: 40,000; Referee: (Italy) Antonio Dattilo

12 August 2005	Napoli (Italy)	1 – 1 (2 – 0 p)	(Italy) Juventus	Stadio San Paolo, Naples
22:30 CEST	Sosa 4' (pen.)	Report	15' Zalayeta	Attendance: 40,000; Referee: (Italy) Christian Brighi
	Penalties
	Gatti (penalty scored); Capparella (penalty scored)		(penalty missed) Zambrotta; (penalty missed) Mutu

=== 2006 ===
- 3 points for win, 0 points for loss
- 2 points for shoot-out win, 1 point for shoot-out loss
- Juventus F.C. wins tournament

Team	Pld	W	SOW	SOL	L	GF	GA	GD	Pts
Juventus	2	1	1	0	0	1	0	+1	5
Napoli	2	1	0	1	0	1	0	+1	4
Internazionale	2	0	0	0	2	0	2	−2	0

11 August 2006	Juventus (Italy)	1 – 0	(Italy) Internazionale	Stadio San Paolo, Naples
20:30 CEST	Zalayeta 13'			Referee: (Italy) Domenico Messina

11 August 2006	Napoli (Italy)	1 – 0	(Italy) Internazionale	Stadio San Paolo, Naples
21:30 CEST	Calaiò 22'			Referee: (Italy) Luca Banti

11 August 2006	Napoli (Italy)	0 – 0 (0 – 1 p)	(Italy) Juventus	Stadio San Paolo, Naples
22:30 CEST				Referee: (Italy) Paolo Tagliavento
	Penalties
	Gatti (penalty missed); Capparella (penalty missed); Domizzi (penalty missed)		(penalty missed) Paro; (penalty scored) Chiumiento

=== 2007 ===
- 3 points for win, 0 points for loss
- 2 points for shoot-out win, 1 point for shoot-out loss
- F.C. Internazionale Milano wins tournament

Team	Pld	W	SOW	SOL	L	GF	GA	GD	Pts
Internazionale	2	2	0	0	0	3	0	+3	6
Juventus	2	1	0	0	1	1	1	0	3
Napoli	2	0	0	0	2	0	3	−3	0

9 August 2007	Napoli (Italy)	0 – 1	(Italy) Juventus	Stadio San Paolo, Naples
20:30 CEST			25' Del Piero	Attendance: 60,000; Referee: (Italy) Nicola Stefanini

9 August 2007	Napoli (Italy)	0 – 2	(Italy) Internazionale	Stadio San Paolo, Naples
21:30 CEST			20' Stanković; 21' Suazo	Attendance: 60,000; Referee: (Italy) Antonio Giannoccaro

9 August 2007	Juventus (Italy)	0 – 1	(Italy) Internazionale	Stadio San Paolo, Naples
22:30 CEST			2' César	Attendance: 60,000; Referee: (Italy) Gianluca Rocchi

=== 2008 ===
- 3 points for win, 0 points for loss
- 2 points for penalty kick win, 1 point for penalty kick loss
- Juventus F.C. wins tournament based on head-to-head result

Team	Pld	W	PKW	PKL	L	GF	GA	GD	Pts
Juventus	2	0	2	0	0	0	0	0	4
Milan	2	1	0	1	0	1	0	+1	4
Napoli	2	0	0	1	1	0	1	−1	1

21 August 2008	Napoli (Italy)	0 – 0 (4 – 5 p)	(Italy) Juventus	Stadio San Paolo, Naples
20:30 CEST		Report		Attendance: 50,000; Referee: (Italy) Domenico Celi
	Penalties
	De Zerbi (penalty missed); Zalayeta (penalty scored); Blasi (penalty scored); Vitale (penalty scored); P. Cannavaro (penalty scored)		(penalty scored) Esposito; (penalty scored) Nedvěd; (penalty scored) Giovinco; (penalty scored) Salihamidžić; (penalty scored) Amauri

21 August 2008	Napoli (Italy)	0 – 1	(Italy) Milan	Stadio San Paolo, Naples
21:30 CEST		Report	44' Paloschi	Attendance: 50,000; Referee: (Italy) Nicola Pierpaoli

21 August 2008	Juventus (Italy)	0 – 0 (5 – 4 p)	(Italy) Milan	Stadio San Paolo, Naples
22:30 CEST		Report		Attendance: 50,000; Referee: (Italy) Andrea Gervasoni
	Penalties
	Ariaudo (penalty scored); Chimenti (penalty scored); Legrottaglie (penalty scored); Pasquato (penalty scored); Amauri (penalty missed); Molinaro (penalty scored)		(penalty scored) Seedorf; (penalty scored) Brocchi; (penalty scored) Paloschi; (penalty scored) Osuji; (penalty missed) Ambrosini; (penalty missed) Favalli

== Gunners ==
The best mark in the event is Christian Vieri with 6 goals, all made with the Inter shirt.

== Television ==
All editions of the Birra Moretti Trophy were transmitted in clear and exclusive channels from Mediaset (sometimes Canale 5, sometimes Italia 1, in some editions the first minigirl was transmitted by Italy 1 and the other two by Channel 5).
