= Gaetano Grieco =

Italian footballer

Personal information
- Date of birth: 7 November 1982 (age 44)
- Place of birth: Naples, Italy
- Height: 1.75 m (5 ft 9 in)
- Position: Forward

Team information
- Current team: Aversa Normanna

Youth career
- 1998–2000: Genoa

Senior career*
Years	Team	Apps	(Gls)
1999–2001	Genoa	30	(5)
2001–2005	Parma	3	(0)
2002–2003	→ Empoli (loan)	10	(1)
2004	→ Genoa (loan)	9	(1)
2005	→ Foggia (loan)	13	(3)
2005–2008	Napoli	16	(0)
2006–2007	→ Avellino (loan)	33	(10)
2007–2008	→ Cavese (loan)	11	(3)
2008	→ Monza (loan)	12	(3)
2008–2010	Juve Stabia	19	(1)
2010–	Aversa Normanna	13	(1)

International career
2000–2001	Italy U18	6	(6)
- * Club domestic league appearances and goals as of 19:16, 8 May 2010 (UTC)

Gaetano Grieco (born 7 November 1982) is an Italian former footballer who played as a forward.

== Club career ==
=== Genoa ===
Born in Naples, Campania, Grieco started his career at Ligurian side Geona. In the late 1990s (in the 1999–2000 season or earlier) he was sold to Parma in a co-ownership deal but was loaned back to Genoa. Grieco made his debut on 12 September 1999, coming on as a substitute for Alessandro Manetti in the 82nd minute against Pescara. Genoa lost the match 1–2.

He was a regular member of the first team the next season, scoring 5 goals.

=== Parma and loans ===
The co-ownership deal was renewed in June 2000 but in June 2001 Parma bought the remained 50% registration rights.

Grieco only played once for Parma in his first Serie A season. He made his debut on 28 October 2001, he substituted Hidetoshi Nakata in the 83rd minute against Hellas Verona. Parma eventually 2–2 draw with the Veneto side who scored by Emiliano Bonazzoli.

In June 2002, he was loaned to Serie A side Empoli along with Amauri. After a half season without an appearance, he was loaned back to Serie B side Genoa in January 2004.

In January 2005, he was loaned to Serie C1 side Foggia after a half season inactive.

=== Napoli and loans ===
In 2005–06 season he left for Napoli Soccer of Serie C1, where he won the champion. Under the shadow of Roberto Sosa, Emanuele Calaiò and Piá, he was mainly a substitute and scored nil. In the next season he left for Avellino and scored 10 goals to help the club win promotion back to Serie B. In August 2007, he was loaned to Serie C1 once again, for Cavese. In January 2008 he left for Monza.

=== Juve Stabia & Aversa ===
In 2008–09 season he left for Lega Pro Prima Divisione side Juve Stabia along with Marco Capparella, which also located in Campania. Napoli also allowed strikers Sosa and Calaiò to leave and recalled Piá as backup player. But the deal finalized in November 2008 after the court void the player contract with Napoli.

He followed the club relegated to Lega Pro Seconda Divisione but played nil. In January 2010, he left for another Seconda Divisione side Aversa Normanna along with Luigi Rinaldi (who also from Genoa CFC and born in Naples), which also located in Campania.

== International career ==
Grieco scored 6 goals for the Italy national under-18 football team in the qualification campaign for the 2001 UEFA European Under-18 Championship. The Azzurrini were drawn in the same group as England, Andorra, and Faroe Islands. They scored a total of 16 goals but lost to England, meaning England qualified for the next qualifying round.

== Honours ==
Parma

- Coppa Italia: 2001–02

Napoli

- Serie C1: 2005–06
