= Lucas Cantoro =

Argentine retired footballer

Personal information
- Full name: Lucas Maximiliano Cantoro
- Date of birth: 3 April 1979 (age 47)
- Place of birth: Argentina
- Position: Striker

Senior career*
Years	Team	Apps	(Gls)
-2001	Club Atlético Vélez Sarsfield	6	(0)
2001	Racing Club de Montevideo→(loan)		
2001-2002	A.C. Monza		
2002-2004	Isernia F.C.		
2004-2005	A.C. Sansovino		
2005-2006	Calcio Foggia 1920 S.S.D.		
2006-2007	Calcio Padova		
2007	A.S.D. Martina Calcio 1947		
2007-2008	Paganese Calcio 1926		
2008-2009	Cosenza Calcio		
2009	S.S.D. Potenza Calcio		
2009-2010	A.C. Pisa 1909		
2011	Hà Nội F.C.	24	(16)
2011-20xx	Hanoi FC		
2014	Qormi F.C.		
2014-2015	Pol. Olympia Agnonese		
2015-2016	Isernia F.C.		
- * Club domestic league appearances and goals

Lucas Cantoro (born 3 April 1979, in Argentina) is an Argentine retired footballer who is last known to have played for Isernia in Italy in 2016.

== Career ==
Cantoro started his senior career with Club Atlético Vélez Sarsfield. In 2011, he signed for Hà Nội in the Vietnamese V.League 1, where he made twenty-four league appearances and scored sixteen goals. After that, he played for Maltese club Qormi and Italian clubs Pol. Olympia Agnonese and Isernia before retiring in 2016.
