= Juan Silva (footballer, born 1981) =

Uruguayan footballer (born 1981)

Juan Ignacio Silva Cerón (born January 15, 1981, in Montevideo, Uruguay) is a Uruguayan footballer currently playing for Miramar Misiones of the Primera Division in Uruguay.

== Teams ==
- (Uruguay) River Plate 2000-2002
- (Uruguay) Deportivo Maldonado 2003-2004
- (Guatemala) Comunicaciones 2005
- (Uruguay) Rentistas 2005-2006
- (Uruguay) Rampla Juniors 2006
- (Italy) Triestina 2007
- (Uruguay) Peñarol 2007-2008
- (Norway) Lyn Oslo 2008
- (Uruguay) Rampla Juniors 2009
- (Uruguay) Rampla Juniors 2010
- (Uruguay) Miramar Misiones 2011–present
