= Gaetano Fontana =

Italian footballer and manager

Personal information
- Date of birth: 21 February 1970 (age 56)
- Place of birth: Catanzaro, Italy
- Height: 1.79 m (5 ft 10 in)
- Position: Attacking midfielder

Senior career*
Years	Team	Apps	(Gls)
1988–1991	Catanzaro	45	(4)
1991–1993	Padova	35	(0)
1993–1994	Reggina	29	(5)
1994–1995	Padova	6	(0)
1995–1997	Alessandria	40	(7)
1997–2000	Juve Stabia	83	(14)
2000–2003	Ascoli	104	(34)
2004	Fiorentina	25	(4)
2005–2006	Napoli	36	(4)
2006–2007	Ascoli	11	(0)

Managerial career
- 2008–2009: Centobuchi
- 2009–2010: Santegidiese
- 2011–2012: Santegidiese
- 2013: Nocerina
- 2016–2017: Juve Stabia
- 2017: Cosenza
- 2018: Casertana
- 2019: Fano
- 2021–2022: Imolese
- 2022–2023: Turris
- 2024: Latina
- 2024–2025: Gubbio
- 2026–: Triestina
- * Club domestic league appearances and goals

Gaetano Fontana (born 21 February 1970) is an Italian football manager and former midfielder, currently in charge of Serie D club Triestina.

== Coaching career ==
On 18 June 2018 he was unveiled as new head coach of Casertana.

On 22 July 2019, he was hired as head coach of Serie C club Fano. On 2 December 2019, he was dismissed following 8 consecutive losses.

On 26 July 2021 he was appointed head coach of Serie C club Imolese.

On 29 December 2022, Fontana was hired by Serie C struggling club Turris.

On 16 January 2024, Fontana returned to management as the new head coach of Serie C club Latina, agreeing on a contract until the end of the season. Fontana was dismissed in July 2024 after rumours he had secretly held negotiations with Salernitana.

On 10 December 2024, Serie C club Gubbio announced the hiring of Fontana as their new head coach. He was dismissed by Gubbio on 16 June 2025.

On 16 July 2026 Fontana was appointed manager of Triestina in Italian fourth level, following their relegation from Serie C at the end of the 2025–26 season.
