= Luca Lacrimini =

Italian footballer

Personal information
- Full name: Luca Lacrimini
- Date of birth: 10 March 1978 (age 48)
- Place of birth: Città di Castello, Italy
- Height: 1.70 m (5 ft 7 in)
- Position: Defender

Senior career*
Years	Team	Apps	(Gls)
1997–2001	Torres	100	(2)
2001–2004	Fermana	70	(0)
2003–2005	Chieti	42	(1)
2005–2006	Sangiovannese	15	(1)
2006–2008	Napoli	9	(0)
2006–2007	→ Frosinone (loan)	21	(0)
2007–2008	→ Ancona (loan)	26	(1)
2008–2009	Cavese	18	(0)
2009–2010	Perugia	16	(0)
- * Club domestic league appearances and goals as of 12:51, 4 May 2010 (UTC)

Luca Lacrimini (born 10 March 1978 in Città di Castello) is a former Italian footballer.

== Biography ==
On 21 July 2006 he was loaned to Frosinone. On 30 July 2007 he left for Serie C1 side Ancona.

On 1 September 2008 he joined Cavese on free transfer. In July 2009 he left for Perugia.
