= Francesco Montervino =

Italian footballer (born 1978)

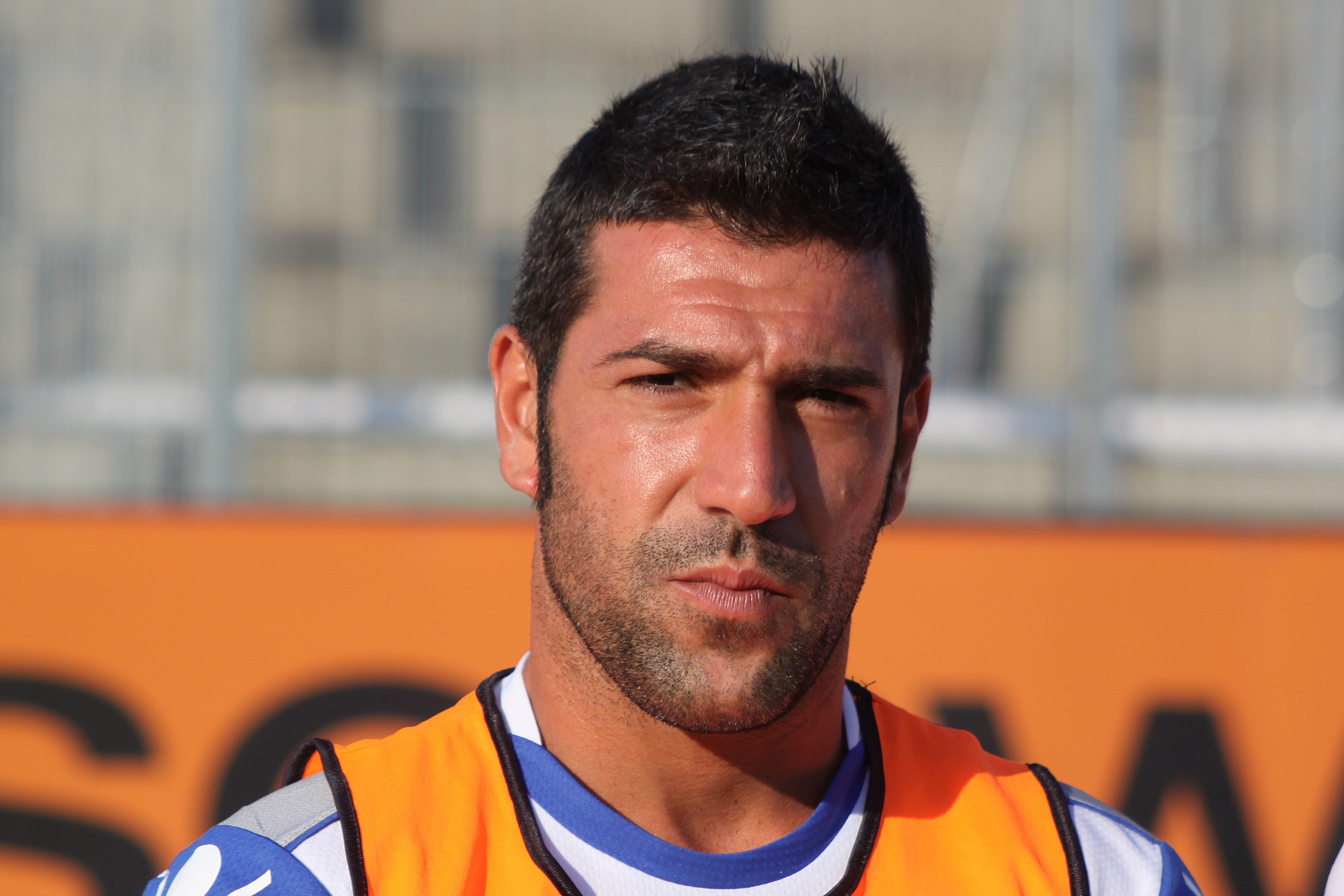
- Montervino with Napoli

Personal information
- Date of birth: 7 May 1978 (age 48)
- Place of birth: Taranto, Italy
- Height: 1.76 m (5 ft 9 in)
- Position: Midfielder

Team information
- Current team: Salernitana

Senior career*
Years	Team	Apps	(Gls)
1994–1995	Fasano	1	(0)
1995–1996	→ Parma (loan)	0	(0)
1996–1997	Taranto	21	(3)
1997–2003	Ancona	121	(8)
2003–2004	Napoli	36	(0)
2004	→ Catania (loan)	19	(0)
2004–2009	Napoli	106	(6)
2009–2011	Salernitana	37	(1)
2011–2012	Salerno	29	(3)
2012–2014	Salernitana	48	(4)
Total		418	(25)
- * Club domestic league appearances and goals

Francesco Montervino (born 7 May 1978) is an Italian football sporting director and former midfielder, who last played for Salernitana.

== Career ==
As a youth, Montervino's first team was the Baby Ippodromo, where he remained there until he was 13. He then played for the youth team of his hometown Taranto, and subsequently for the youth teams of Fasano, and A.C.Parma. He then transferred to the Fasano senior side in 1996, where he played 21 matches and scored 3 goals.

=== Ancona (1997–2003) ===
In 1997, Montervino transferred to Serie B side Ancona and remained there for six years, playing 121 matches and scoring 8 goals.

=== Napoli (2003–2009) ===
In 2003 Montervino signed for Napoli, where he soon became a popular figure with the fans, due to his dynamism, passion, work-rate, leadership, and tenacious style of play. He spent the next seven seasons with the club, aside from a loan spell with Catania in 2004, and was seen as the symbol of the club's rebirth, as he contributed to the Napoli's promotions from Serie C to Serie B, and eventually Serie A, later becoming the team's captain. During his time with the team, he also made his European debut with the club in the UEFA Europa League.

=== Salernitana (2009–2014) and Salerno (2011–12) ===
After seven years with Napoli, Montervino moved to Serie B side Salernitana on 31 August 2009. During his spell with Salernitana, he also briefly played for Salerno, the new club of the city, during the 2011–12 season, before returning to Salernitana in Lega Pro 2. After the conclusion of the 2013–14 season, Montervino was a free-agent, not having renewed his contract with the club, and subsequently retired from professional football, to pursue a career as a sporting director.

== Style of play ==
A dynamic, tenacious, and hard-working box-to-box player, with an ability to make attacking runs, Montervino primarily functioned as a central midfielder or as a defensive midfielder due to his ball-winning ability, although he was capable of playing anywhere in midfield, and was also occasionally deployed as an offensive midfielder; despite not being particularly skilled from a technical standpoint, he also possessed a solid first touch. Due to his tactical versatility and defensive work-rate, he was also capable of playing in several other positions, and was also deployed as a full-back, wing-back and as a wide midfielder on either flank on occasion. Throughout his career he stood out for his leadership and dedication on the pitch, in particular during his stint as Napoli's captain.

== Outside of football ==
In 2008, Montervino expressed interest in pursuing a career as a restaurateur outside of football. In 2011, he inaugurated his new restaurant Com'era, in Meta di Sorrento.

== After retirement ==
Following his retirement, Montervino worked as a sporting director for his former club Taranto in 2015.

== Honours ==
Napoli

- Serie C1: 2005–06

Salernitana

- Coppa Italia Lega Pro: 2013–14

Sporting positions
Preceded by Gennaro Scarlato	Napoli captain 2005–2006	Succeeded by Gennaro Iezzo
