= Nicolás Amodio =

Uruguayan footballer (born 1983)

Personal information
- Full name: Nicolás Amodio
- Date of birth: March 10, 1983 (age 43)
- Place of birth: Montevideo, Uruguay
- Height: 1.79 m (5 ft 10 1/2 in)
- Position: Midfielder

Senior career*
Years	Team	Apps	(Gls)
2003–2004	Defensor Sporting	28	(1)
2004–2005	Sambenedettese	32	(1)
2005–2011	Napoli	55	(1)
2007–2008	→ Treviso (loan)	9	(0)
2008	→ Mantova (loan)	17	(0)
2010	→ Piacenza Calcio (loan)	18	(0)
2011	→ Portogruaro (loan)	16	(0)
2011–2013	Peñarol	8	(0)
2013–2015	Lecce	23	(2)
- * Club domestic league appearances and goals

Nicolás Amodio (born 10 March 1983) is a former Uruguayan footballer who played as a midfielder.

== History ==
Amodio started his football career at hometown club Defensor Sporting in Uruguay during 2003, Sporting were playing in Primera División Uruguaya at the time, which is the nation's top league. He appeared for the club only twice, before relocating to Italy.

The first Italian club he played for was Sambenedettese in Serie C, he notched up 30 appearances scoring 1 goal during his only season for the club. He would move next to Napoli along with fellow Uruguayan midfielder, Mariano Bogliacino.

Amodio was a prominent member for the club during the 2005–06 season, he turned out for them 29 times. Napoli gained promotion back to Serie B by the end of the season. In January 2010 Napoli loaned the Uruguayan midfielder to Serie B club Piacenza Calcio until June 2010.

In August 2013 he signs a contract with US Lecce.
