= Fabio Gatti =

Italian footballer

Personal information
- Date of birth: 4 January 1982 (age 44)
- Place of birth: Perugia, Italy
- Height: 1.78 m (5 ft 10 in)
- Position: Midfielder

Team information
- Current team: Lecco

Youth career
- Perugia

Senior career*
Years	Team	Apps	(Gls)
2001–2004	Perugia	48	(0)
2002–2003	→ Catania (loan)	25	(0)
2004–2007	Napoli	43	(0)
2006	→ Cremonese (loan)	16	(0)
2008	Modena	18	(0)
2008–2010	Perugia	27	(1)
2010	→ Vicenza (loan)	11	(1)
2011	Paganese	14	(0)
2011–	Lecco		

International career
2001–2003	Italy U21	7	(0)
- * Club domestic league appearances and goals

Fabio Gatti (born 4 January 1982) is an Italian former footballer who played as a midfielder.

== Club career ==
Gatti started his career at Perugia. He played twice for the club in the 2002 UEFA Intertoto Cup and once in Serie A before he left on loan to Catania. After the relegation of Perugia in 2004, he was sold to SSC Napoli in Serie C1 in a co-ownership deal. He made 16 league appearances in his first season. After he played 4 league matches in the first half of his second season, he was loaned to Cremonese of Serie B. He made 16 appearances as Cremonese were relegated in June. He returned to Napoli and helped them to promotion to Serie B as Serie C1 champion, and then Gatti made 19 starts as Napoli finished Serie B runner-up. In his final season, he was completely ruled out of the squad. In January 2008, he signed a short-term contract with Modena.

In September 2008, he signed a contract with hometown club Perugia at Prima Divisione. In January 2010 he was exchanged with Orlando Urbano, Filippo Forò and Giampietro Perrulli.

In January 2011, he was signed along with Urbano.

In July 2011 he left for Lecco.

== International career ==
Gatti played 7 matches for Italy U21. He was called up to the 2002 UEFA European Under-21 Football Championship, but did not play.

== Honours ==
Perugia

- UEFA Intertoto Cup: 2003

Napoli

- Serie C1: 2005–06
- Serie B (Serie A promotion): 2006–07
