= Tommaso Romito =

Italian footballer

Personal information
- Full name: Tommaso Romito
- Date of birth: 9 February 1982 (age 44)
- Place of birth: Bari, Italy
- Height: 1.81 m (5 ft 11 in)
- Position: Defender

Senior career*
Years	Team	Apps	(Gls)
2000–2001	Locorotondo	26	(1)
2001–2002	Bari primavera	29	(6)
2002–2005	Chieti	52	(0)
2005	→ Napoli (loan)	3	(0)
2005–2006	Napoli	26	(2)
2006–2007	Salernitana	10	(1)
2007–2010	Pescara	39	(1)
2010–2011	→ Lanciano (loan)	22	(0)
2011–2012	Pergocrema	16	(0)
2012–2013	Fano	17	(1)
2013–2014	Nocerina	6	(0)
- * Club domestic league appearances and goals as of 31 January 2012

Tommaso Romito (born 9 February 1982 in Bari) is a retired Italian footballer.

== Career ==
Romito was signed by Napoli in January 2005 and won a promotion with the club in 2006. He was out of Napoli's plan at Serie B and then Serie A, Romito was loaned to Salernitana of Serie C1 and Pescara of Serie C1. In summer 2008, he was signed by Pescara in co-ownership deal.
