= Luca Banti =

Italian football referee

- Full name: Luca Banti
- Born: 27 March 1974 (age 52); Livorno, Italy

Domestic
Years	League	Role

International
Years	League	Role
2009–2018	FIFA listed	Referee

Luca Banti (Italian: [ˈluːka ˈbanti]; born 27 March 1974 in Livorno) is an Italian football referee. In 2009, he became a UEFA Category three referee and at the start of 2010 he was promoted to category two and later to category one.

Banti became a FIFA referee in 2009. He has served as a referee in 2014 World Cup qualifiers.
