= Matteo Gianello =

Italian footballer (born 1976)

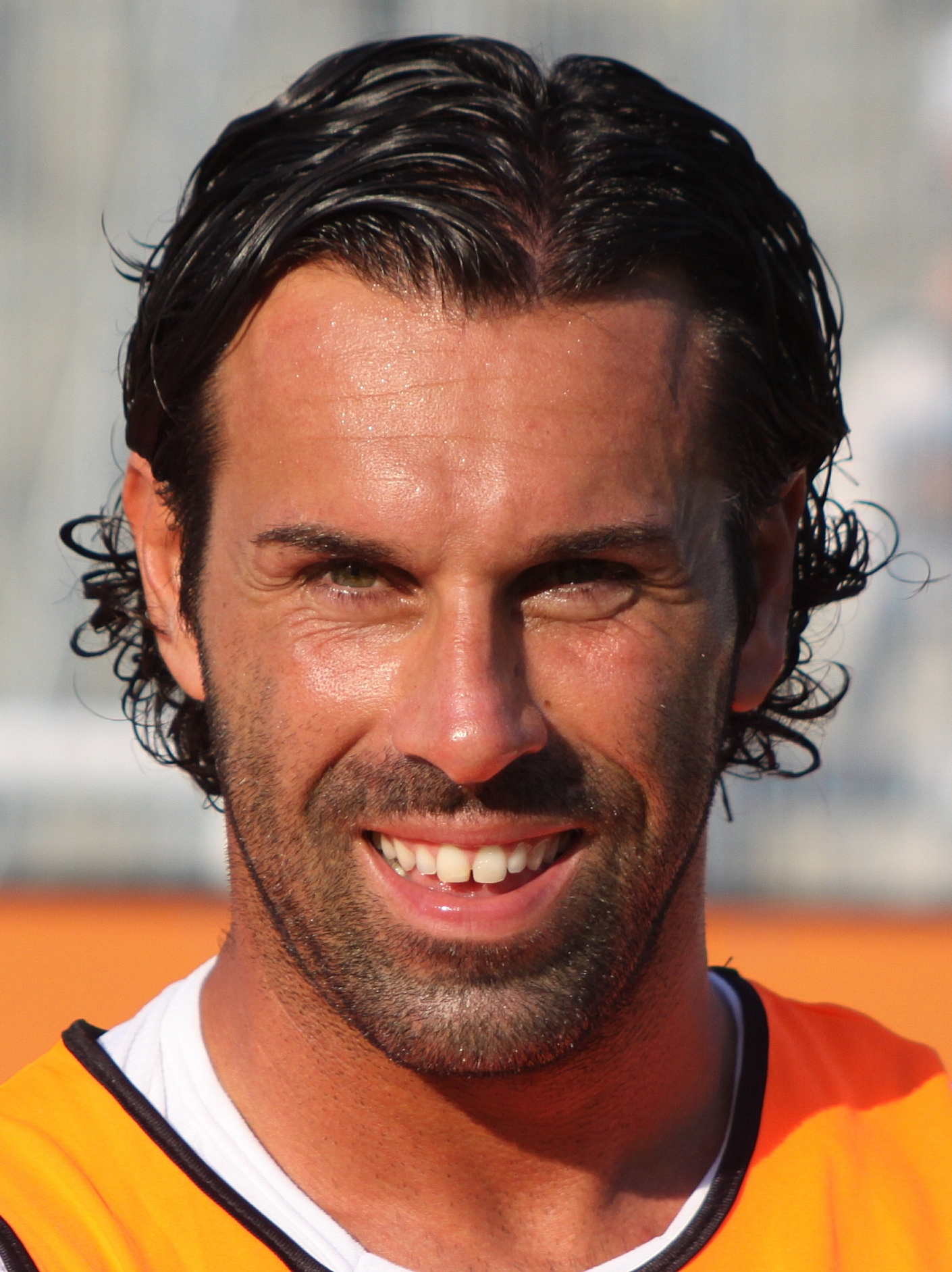
- Gianello with Napoli

Personal information
- Date of birth: 7 May 1976 (age 50)
- Place of birth: Bovolone, Italy
- Height: 1.89 m (6 ft 2 in)
- Position: Goalkeeper

Youth career
- Chievo

Senior career*
Years	Team	Apps	(Gls)
1993–2000	Chievo	69	(0)
1994–1995	→ Sampdoria (loan)	0	(0)
2000–2004	Siena	55	(0)
2002–2003	→ Verona (loan)	1	(0)
2004	→ Lodigiani (loan)	15	(0)
2004–2011	Napoli	45	(0)
2011	Sarego	3	(0)
2012	Villafranca	4	(0)
Total		192	(0)
- * Club domestic league appearances and goals

Matteo Gianello (born 7 May 1976) is an Italian former professional footballer who played as a goalkeeper. In 2012, he was charged with match fixing during his time at Napoli, regarding matches played in 2010.

He originally came from Bovolone, Italy. He was part of the team that brought Napoli from Serie C back to Serie A. In 2013, his ban from professional football was reduced from three years and three months to one year and nine months.
