= Andrea Cupi =

Italian footballer (born 1976)

Personal information
- Date of birth: 27 January 1976 (age 50)
- Place of birth: Frascati, Italy
- Height: 1.76 m (5 ft 9 in)
- Position: Defender

Senior career*
Years	Team	Apps	(Gls)
1994–1996	Roma	0	(0)
1996–1997	Cisco Roma	21	(0)
1997–1998	Carpi	31	(0)
1998–2005	Empoli	136	(0)
2006–2008	Napoli	48	(0)
2008–2010	Empoli	22	(0)
Total		258	(0)
- * Club domestic league appearances and goals

Andrea Cupi (born 27 January 1976) is an Italian former professional footballer who played as a defender.

Cupi played for Empoli where he spent much of his career and played over 100 games before he signed for Napoli on a free transfer in January 2006.
