= Marco Capparella =

Italian footballer (born 1975)

Personal information
- Date of birth: 28 March 1975 (age 51)
- Place of birth: Rome, Italy
- Height: 1.70 m (5 ft 7 in)
- Position: Midfielder

Team information
- Current team: Fiorentina (U17 manager)

Senior career*
Years	Team	Apps	(Gls)
1994–1995	Sparta Novara	34	(18)
1995–1997	Varese	62	(7)
1997–1999	Sora	64	(18)
1999–2000	Perugia	0	(0)
2000–2001	Catania	14	(1)
2001	→ Andria (loan)	13	(4)
2001–2003	Sora	51	(8)
2003	→ Avellino (loan)	13	(4)
2003–2004	Avellino	42	(11)
2004–2005	Ascoli	19	(2)
2005	→ Napoli (loan)	9	(1)
2005–2008	Napoli	42	(3)
2008–2010	Juve Stabia	36	(11)
2010	→ Valle del Giovenco (loan)	12	(4)
2010–2011	→ Casertana (loan)	8	(1)
2011–2012	L'Aquila	35	(1)
2012	San Nicolò		
2013–2014	Torrese		
2014–2015	Martinsicuro		
2015–2016	Pontevomano		

Managerial career
- 2015–2016: Pontevomano (player-coach)
- 2018–2020: Castelnuovo Vomano
- 2020–2023: Fiorentina (youth)
- 2023–: Fiorentina (U17)
- * Club domestic league appearances and goals

Marco Capparella (born 28 March 1975) is an Italian football coach and a former midfielder who is the manager of the Under-17 squad of Fiorentina.

== Career ==
On 1 July 2011, Capparella signed a contract with L'Aquila for the 2011–12 season.
