= Piá (footballer, born 1982) =

Brazilian footballer

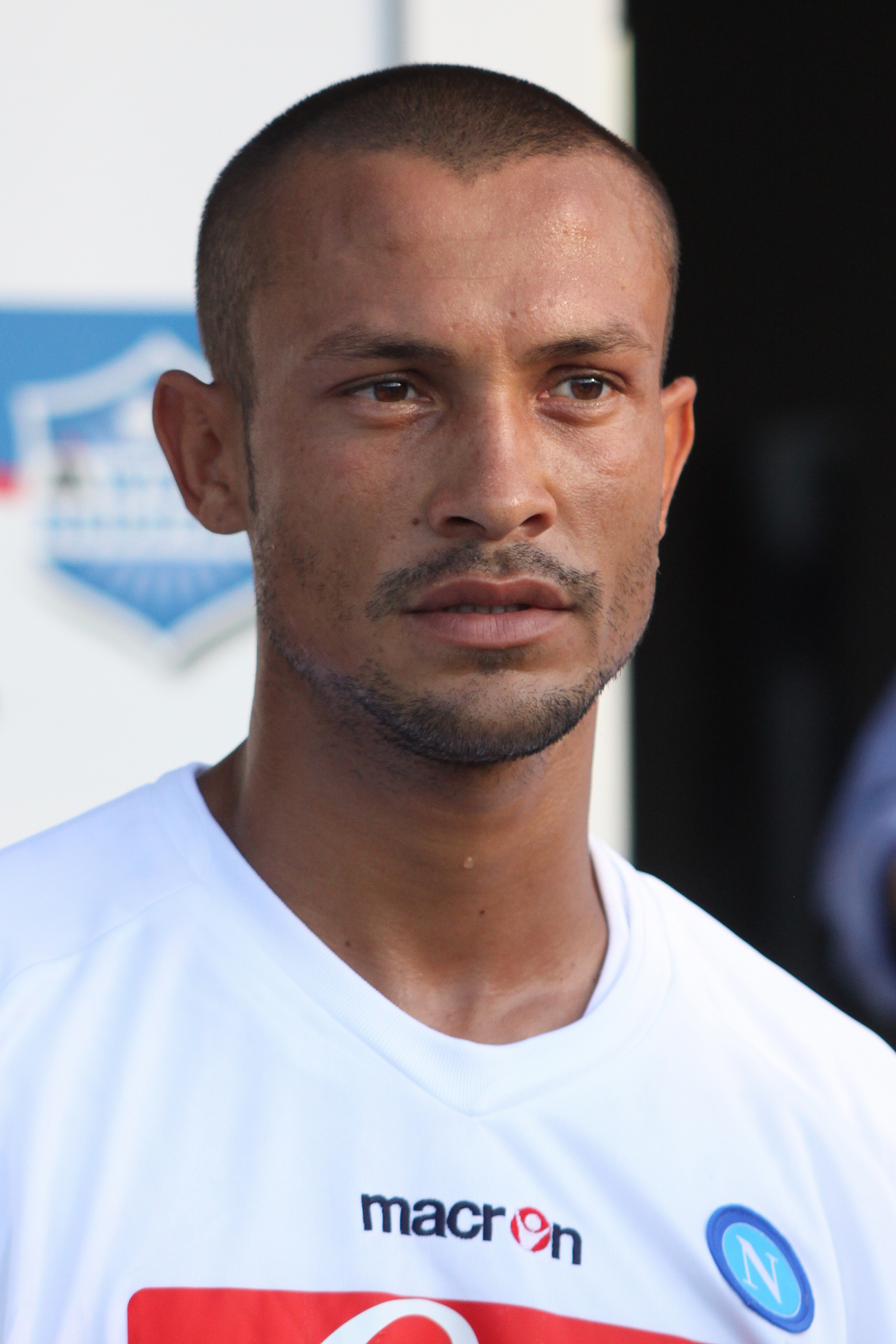

Personal information
- Full name: João Batista Inácio
- Date of birth: 22 March 1982 (age 44)
- Place of birth: Ibitinga, Brazil
- Height: 1.77 m (5 ft 10 in)
- Positions: Striker; winger

Youth career
- 1999–2001: Atalanta

Senior career*
Years	Team	Apps	(Gls)
2001–2005	Atalanta	33	(1)
2003–2004	→ Ascoli (loan)	36	(13)
2005–2010	Napoli	79	(16)
2007–2008	→ Treviso (loan)	16	(3)
2008	→ Catania (loan)	8	(0)
2010	→ Torino (loan)	17	(3)
2010–2011	Portogruaro	13	(1)
2011–2012	Pergocrema	22	(10)
2012–2013	Lecce	21	(3)
2013–2014	L'Aquila	12	(1)
2014	Taranto	7	(0)
2014–2015	Darfo Boario	12	(7)
2015	Varese	1	(0)
2016	Pro Patria	4	(0)
2016	Darfo Boario	11	(2)
2016–2017	Adrense	12	(4)
- * Club domestic league appearances and goals as of 17:45, 17 April 2017 (UTC) ‡ National team caps and goals as of 20 October 2012

João Batista Inácio (born 22 March 1982), commonly known as Piá, is a Brazilian former footballer who played as a forward.

== Football career ==
=== Atalanta ===
Piá got his start by playing for Atalanta in Serie A, where he made his Serie A debut on 2 December 2001, in the 4–2 defeat to Internazionale. He scored only one goal in 23 appearances during his first years at the club. A loan spell came next as he joined up with then Serie B side Ascoli for a season, where this spell proved to be quite a successful time, scoring 13 goals in 36 games.

=== Napoli ===
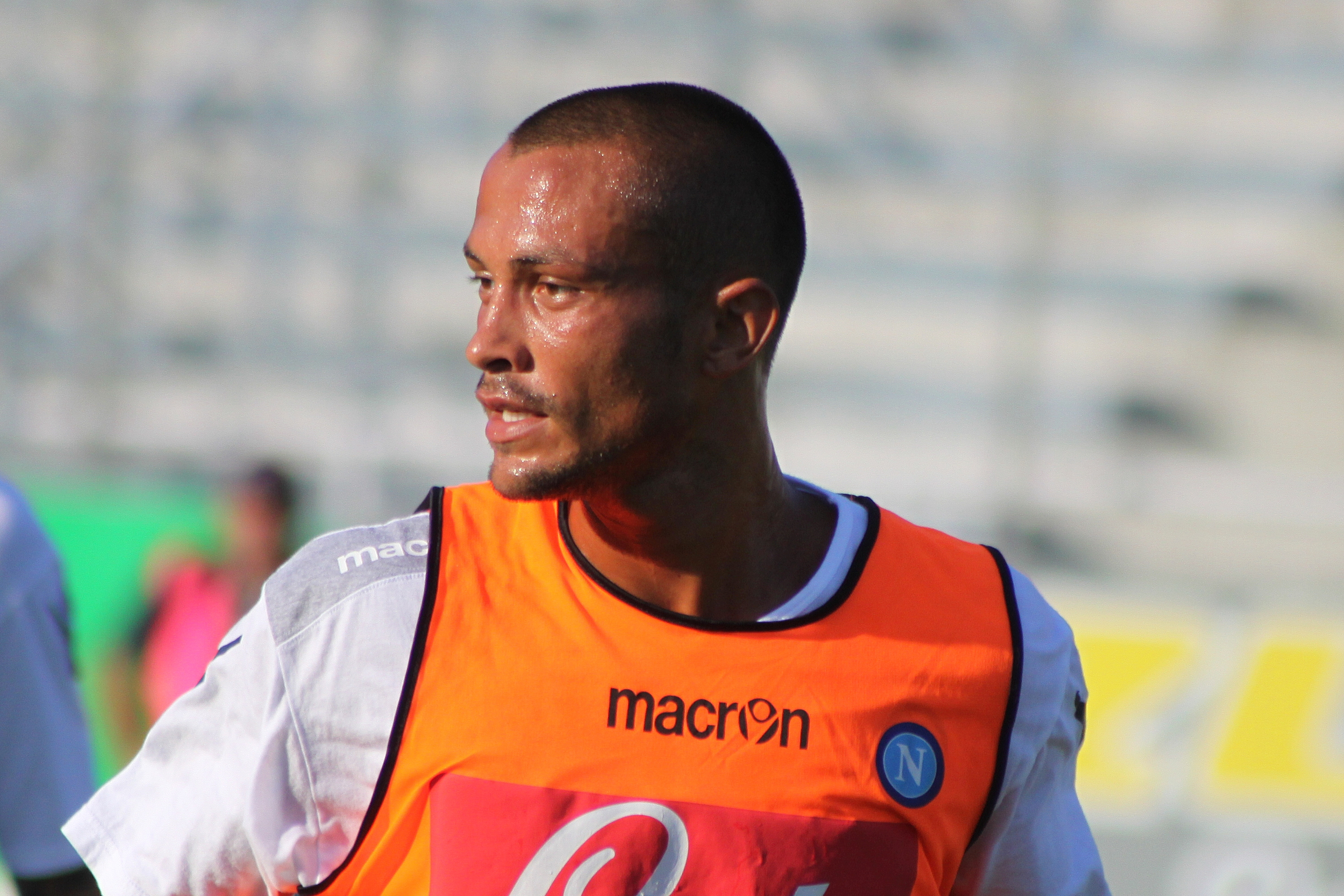
Piá training with Napoli

After his loan spell ended, Piá returned to Atalanta making 10 more appearances for the club, before transferring to Napoli on a co-ownership deal in January 2005, for €750,000. He scored during his first official match for Napoli, in the 3–0 victory over Giulianova.

Piá helped the club achieve the Serie C1 championship, gaining promotion back into Serie B. The co-ownership deal with Atalanta was resolved in favour of Napoli in early 2005, for another €600,000. Despite being a regular starter with the club, and signing a new deal in May 2006 that will keep him at the club until 2011, he became a surplus in Napoli's Serie A campaign, and thus he was loaned to Treviso for another Serie B season. After just six months in Serie B with Treviso, he was loaned out to Serie A side Catania.

In June 2008, he returned to Napoli to wear once again the Neapolitan colours, and made his debut in the UEFA Cup match against Vllaznia, where he scored a brace in the 3–0 win. In the return fixture, he scored the second goal in the 5–0 defeat of the Albanian club.

In January 2010 he was loaned to Serie B side Torino.

=== Portogruaro ===
On 31 August 2010, he left Napoli permanently to join newly promoted Serie B side Portogruaro.

=== Lega Pro clubs ===
In September 2011 he left for Italian third division club Pergocrema. After scoring 10 goals with Pergocrema, he signed with Lecce the following the season.

== Name spelling ==
The nickname Piá is pronounced as it is spelled (in his native Portuguese). The accent would signify that the stress is on the second syllable. In Italian, the language of his current team, the phonetic equivalent is written Pià, which is used for Italian television graphics.

== Personal life ==
He is the older brother of Brazilian footballer Joelson, who also spent most of his career in Italy.

His son Samuele Inácio, born in 2008, followed in his footsteps and is currently a youth player for Borussia Dortmund and the Italian youth representatives.
