= Gennaro Iezzo =

Italian footballer (born 1973)

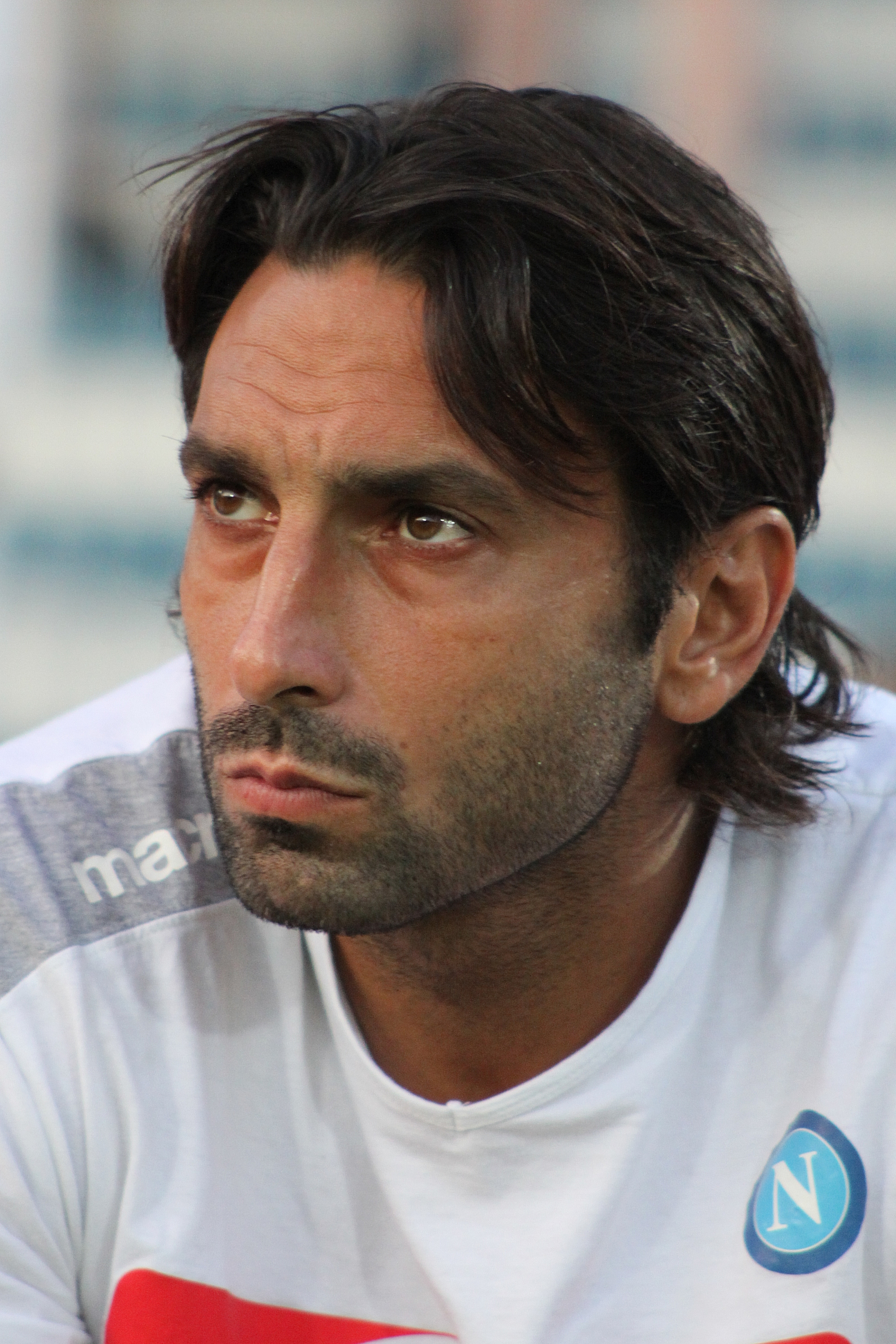
- Iezzo with Napoli

Personal information
- Date of birth: 8 June 1973 (age 53)
- Place of birth: Castellammare di Stabia, Italy
- Height: 1.85 m (6 ft 1 in)
- Position: Goalkeeper

Team information
- Current team: Chieti (head coach)

Youth career
- 1989–1990: Juve Stabia

Senior career*
Years	Team	Apps	(Gls)
1990–1991	Scafatese	2	(0)
1991–1992	Avellino	0	(0)
1992–1994	Scafatese	23	(0)
1994–1997	Nocerina	22	(0)
1997–1999	Verona	5	(0)
1999–2003	Catania	95	(0)
2003–2005	Cagliari	25	(0)
2005–2011	Napoli	105	(0)
2011–2012	Nuvla San Felice	0	(0)
Total		277	(0)

Managerial career
- 2012: Sant'Antonio Abate
- 2022: Botev Vratsa
- 2023–: Chieti
- * Club domestic league appearances and goals

Gennaro Iezzo (born 8 June 1973) is an Italian football manager and former player who played as a goalkeeper. He is the head coach of Serie D club Chieti.

== Playing career ==
Iezzo began his career at hometown club Juve Stabia before moving on to play for Scafatese, Avellino, Nocerina, Verona, Calcio Catania and Cagliari. He spent two seasons as the partenopei's number one in Serie C1 and Serie B, helping Napoli earn promotion back into Serie A, also briefly serving as the club's captain.

== Managerial career ==
In 2012, Iezzo resigned as coach of Serie D club Sant'Antonio Abate after getting three consecutive defeats in first three games.

In April 2022, Iezzo returned into management as the new head coach of POFC Botev Vratsa in the Bulgarian First League. In his five games in charge of the club, he achieved two wins, two draws and a defeat, and saved the team from relegation after leading them to defeat Etar Veliko Tarnovo 3–2 in a promotion/relegation playoff.

On 27 December 2023, Iezzo was unveiled as the new head coach of Serie D promotion hopefuls Chieti.
