= Andrea Gervasoni =

Italian football referee

- Full name: Andrea Gervasoni
- Born: 21 July 1975 (age 51); Castiglione delle Stiviere, Mantua, Italy

Domestic
Years	League	Role
2003–2006	Serie C	Referee
2006–2010	Serie A & B	Referee
2010–2015	Serie A	Referee

Andrea Gervasoni (born 21 July 1975) is an Italian professional football referee who officiates primarily in the Serie A.
