= Roberto Sosa (Argentine footballer) =

Argentine footballer and manager

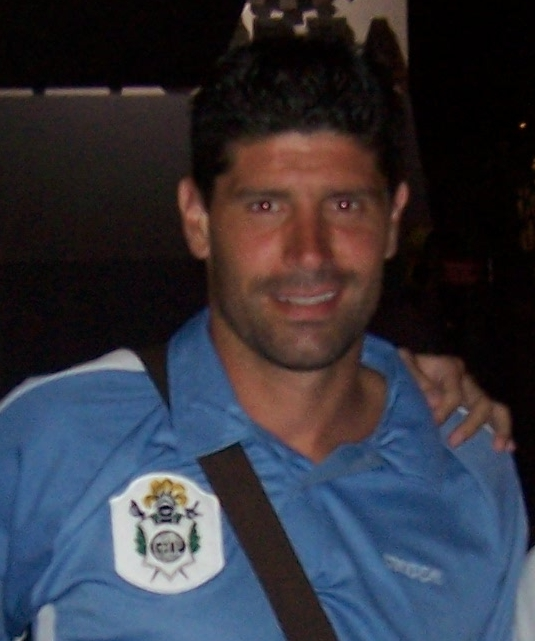

Personal information
- Full name: Roberto Carlos Sosa
- Date of birth: 24 January 1975 (age 51)
- Place of birth: Santa Rosa, La Pampa, Argentina
- Height: 1.89 m (6 ft 2 in)
- Position: Striker

Youth career
- Gimnasia de La Plata

Senior career*
Years	Team	Apps	(Gls)
1995–1998	Gimnasia de La Plata	83	(38)
1998–2002	Udinese	103	(31)
2002	Boca Juniors	7	(0)
2002–2003	Gimnasia de La Plata	15	(2)
2003–2004	Ascoli	18	(4)
2004	→ Messina (loan)	21	(5)
2004–2008	Napoli	116	(28)
2008–2010	Gimnasia de La Plata	32	(2)
2010–2011	Sanremese	8	(2)
2011–2012	FC Rapperswil-Jona	24	(3)
Total		427	(115)

Managerial career
- 2014–2015: Sorrento
- 2015–2016: Savoia
- 2016–2017: Vultur Rionero
- * Club domestic league appearances and goals

Roberto Carlos Sosa (born 24 January 1975) is an Argentine former professional footballer and coach.

== Playing career ==
Sosa was born in Santa Rosa, La Pampa. He started playing for Gimnasia y Esgrima La Plata in 1995. His best season with Gimnasia was in 1997–98 when he scored 28 goals in 38 matches. He was the top scorer in the 1998 Argentine Torneo Clausura, with 17 goals. After this excellent season, Sosa was transferred to Italy, to play with Serie A team Udinese.

He spent almost 10 years playing in Europe, playing with Serie A and Serie B teams Ascoli and Messina. He also spent four years with S.S.C. Napoli between 2004 and 2008, helping Napoli to return to the Italian Serie A. Then, he returned to Argentina to play for his first club Gimnasia y Esgrima de La Plata, which was struggling to keep its Primera A standing. Even though Sosa had a mediocre 2008/09 season, scoring only 2 goals in 24 games, he helped Gimnasia to avoid relegation.

Perhaps, his most memorable moment during his last return to Gimnasia happened on 5 April 2009. Sosa was unable to deliver on his promise to score twice against derby rivals Estudiantes, and became upset with those who criticized him for running his mouth, citing his ten-year playing spell in Europe.

In June 2010, Sosa signed in for Sanremese. In December 2010, he received death threats to leave the club by the 'Ndrangheta. He was out of the team by February. He finished the season playing for FC Rapperswil-Jona in Switzerland Third Division. At the end of the season, he retired.

Roberto Sosa was not a technical player, but he was an effective scorer. Overall, he scored 112 goals in 385 games.

== Post-playing and coaching career ==
After his retirement, Sosa has been working as a color commentator for Sky Italia and took his coaching badges. On 1 August 2014, he was appointed head coach of recently relegated Serie D club Sorrento. He left Sorrento by mutual consent on 5 January 2015.

He then served as head coach of Eccellenza Campania club Savoia throughout the 2015–16 season, ended in third place.

In September 2016, Sosa accepted an offer from newly promoted Serie D club Vultur Rionero.

== Personal life ==
Sosa's son Tomás, born 2001 in Udine, followed on his father's footsteps and he plays for Serie C club Pontedera as of February 2023.

== Honours ==
=== Udinese ===
- UEFA Intertoto Cup: 2000

=== Napoli ===
- Serie C1
  - Winners (1): 2005–06
