= Emanuele Calaiò =

Italian footballer (born 1982)

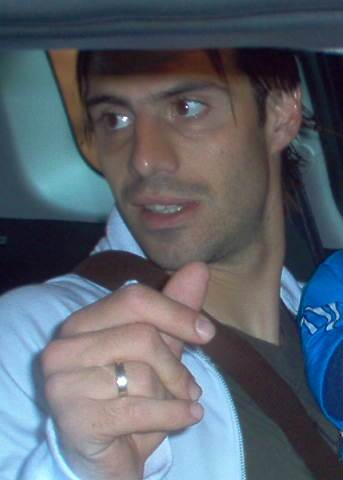

Personal information
- Full name: Emanuele Calaiò
- Date of birth: 8 January 1982 (age 44)
- Place of birth: Palermo, Italy
- Height: 1.79 m (5 ft 10 in)
- Position: Striker

Team information
- Current team: Zeta Napoli

Youth career
- 1997–1999: Torino

Senior career*
| Years | Team | Apps | (Gls) |
| 1999–2003 | Torino | 20 | (3) |
| 2002 | → Ternana (loan) | 10 | (2) |
| 2002–2003 | → Messina (loan) | 12 | (2) |
| 2003–2005 | Pescara | 70 | (28) |
| 2005–2008 | Napoli | 112 | (40) |
| 2008–2013 | Siena | 148 | (46) |
| 2013 | → Napoli (loan) | 6 | (0) |
| 2013–2014 | Napoli | 0 | (0) |
| 2013–2014 | → Genoa (loan) | 22 | (3) |
| 2014–2015 | Catania | 35 | (18) |
| 2015–2016 | Spezia | 39 | (9) |
| 2016–2019 | Parma | 77 | (30) |
| 2019 | Salernitana | 12 | (2) |
| 2025- | Zeta Napoli | 20 | (36) |
| Total | | 552 | (214) |

International career
| 1998 | Italy U15 | 3 | (0) |
| 1999 | Italy U17 | 1 | (0) |
| 2000–2001 | Italy U18 | 4 | (1) |
| 2001–2003 | Italy U20 | 14 | (12) |
| 2001 | Italy U21 | 1 | (0) |
- * Club domestic league appearances and goals

Emanuele Calaiò (born 8 January 1982) is an Italian footballer who played as a striker who plays for Zeta Napoli.

== Club career ==
Calaiò started his football career at Torino making his league debut against Reggina on 6 January 2000, he scored a goal for Torino three minutes into his debut. He made 20 league appearances in total for Torino.

In January 2002, Calaiò was exchanged with Alessandro Cibocchi of Ternana with inflated price tag to create a paper profit for both clubs (for which Ternana was fined in 2010, 8 years later) and then a short spell with Messina followed. In January 2003, he was loaned by Pescara and turned permanently in June 2004. He also returned to Torino Calcio in 2003 in exchange with Cibocchi again.

With Pescara, Calaiò solidified himself as an impressive striker, the club won promotion back into Serie B in 2003, with Calaiò scoring 20 times in his second season. In the third at Serie B, he scored 6 in the first half of the season.

=== Napoli ===
In January 2005, Napoli in Serie C1 signed him for €2.85 million, he scored just 6 in the first season, but in the second he scored 18, won the champion and promotion back to Serie B with club. He scored 14 in his third season with Napoli, won promotion back to Serie A. With the arrival of Marcelo Zalayeta and Ezequiel Lavezzi, he had limited chances to play.

=== Siena ===
In July 2008, Calaiò joined fellow Serie A team, Siena in a co-ownership bid, for €2.3 million. in June 2009 Siena signed him outright for €1.25 million (which made Napoli register a financial loss of €1.05 million). He followed Siena, relegated to Serie B in 2010 and finished as the runner-up and promoted back to top division. On 10 June 2011, he signed a new three-year contract. He was one of the two starting strikers along with Mattia Destro in 2011–12 Serie A season, scoring 11 goals in 25 league matches until he broke his leg in March 2012.

=== Return to Napoli ===
On 11 January 2013, his transfer to former team Napoli was officially announced. He arrived on-loan with the option to make the switch permanent if Napoli qualified for the Champions League during the 2013 season.

=== Catania ===
On 11 July 2014, his transfer to Catania was officially announced. He signed a two-year contract with an option for a third.

=== Spezia ===
On 3 August 2015, Calaiò was signed by Spezia.

=== Parma ===
On 4 August 2016, Calaiò was sold to Parma. On 23 July 2018, he was handed a two-year ban and a €20,000 fine, following text messages "eliciting a reduced effort" from two players of Spezia during the 2017–18 Serie B, a match Parma won 2–0 to secure promotion to 2018–19 Serie A. On 9 August, Calaiò's ban was reduced, expiring on 31 December 2018, however the fine was increased to €30,000.

=== Salernitana ===
On 31 January 2019, Calaiò signed to Salernitana. On 17 September 2019, he announced his retirement from playing.

== International career ==
Calaiò capped for both Italy U21 and Serie B U21 selection which played the latter for the match 3–2 won Belgium U21 on 30 March 2004. He also received the Serie B U21 call-up for the match against Legnano.

He also call-up to 2000 UEFA European Under-18 Football Championship qualification and played in qualifying match in 2001 edition. Calaiò capped once for U17 team, at that time the feeder team of U18. (now called Italy national under-18 football team)

== Style of play ==
A left–footed striker, Calaiò was mainly known for his heading, ability in the air, and eye for goal; he was also an accurate penalty taker.

== Personal life ==
Calaiò is married to Federica, sister of Nicola Mora's wife. Both players played for Torino during the 2000–01 season and Napoli in 2004–05.

== Career statistics ==
As of 12 September 2009

| Club performance | | | League | | Cup | | Total | |
| Season | Club | League | Apps | Goals | Apps | Goals | Apps | Goals |
| Italy | | | League | | Coppa Italia | | Total | |
|---|---|---|---|---|---|---|---|---|
| 1999–2000 | Torino | Serie A | 7 | 1 | 0 | 0 | 7 | 1 |
| 2000–01 | Torino | Serie B | 9 | 2 | 2 | 0 | 11 | 2 |
| 2001–02 | Torino | Serie A | 4 | 0 | 1 | 0 | 5 | 0 |
| 2001–02 | Ternana | Serie B | 10 | 2 | | | 10 | 2 |
| 2002–03 | Messina | Serie B | 12 | 2 | 0 | 0 | 12 | 2 |
| 2002–03 | Pescara | Serie C1 | 8 | 1 | | | 10^{1} | 1 |
| 2003–04 | Pescara | Serie B | 43 | 20 | 1 | 0 | 44 | 20 |
| 2004–05 | Pescara | Serie B | 19 | 6 | 3 | 2 | 22 | 8 |
| 2004–05 | Napoli | Serie C1 | 15 | 6 | | | 18^{2} | 6 |
| 2005–06 | Napoli | Serie C1 | 33 | 18 | 3 | 1 | 36 | 19 |
| 2006–07 | Napoli | Serie B | 38 | 14 | 3 | 2 | 41 | 16 |
| 2007–08 | Napoli | Serie A | 26 | 2 | 5 | 1 | 31 | 3 |
| 2008–09 | Siena | Serie A | 33 | 5 | 2 | 1 | 35 | 6 |
| 2009–10 | Siena | Serie A | 33 | 8 | 1 | 1 | 34 | 9 |
| 2010–11 | Siena | Serie B | 39 | 18 | 1 | 0 | 40 | 18 |
| 2011–12 | Siena | Serie A | 25 | 11 | 1 | 1 | 26 | 12 |
| 2012–13 | Siena | Serie A | 18 | 4 | 1 | 1 | 19 | 5 |
| 2013–14 | Genoa | Serie A | 22 | 3 | | | 22 | 3 |
| 2014–15 | Catania | Serie B | 35 | 18 | 2 | 0 | 37 | 18 |
| 2015–16 | Spezia | Serie B | 37 | 9 | 3 | 2 | 40 | 11 |
| 2016–17 | Parma | Lega Pro | 36 | 15 | 1 | 1 | 37 | 16 |
| Career total | | | 502 | 165 | 30 | 13 | 532 | 178 |

^{1}Include 2 matches at promotion playoffs
^{2}Include 3 matches at promotion playoffs

== Honours ==
Torino

- Serie B: 2000–01

Napoli

- Serie C1: 2005–06
- Serie B: 2006–07
