= Mariano Bogliacino =

Uruguayan footballer (born 1980)

Personal information
- Full name: Mariano Adriàn Hernandez Bogliacino
- Date of birth: 2 June 1980 (age 46)
- Place of birth: Colonia, Uruguay
- Height: 1.77 m (5 ft 9 1/2 in)
- Position: Attacking midfielder

Team information
- Current team: Deportivo Maldonado

Youth career
- 1998: Plaza Colonia
- 1999: Villa Española

Senior career*
Years	Team	Apps	(Gls)
1998–2002	Plaza Colonia	41	(11)
2003	→ Peñarol (loan)	8	(0)
2003–2004	→ Las Palmas (loan)	25	(2)
2004–2005	Sambenedettese	31	(5)
2005–2011	Napoli	139	(17)
2010–2011	→ Chievo (loan)	34	(1)
2011–2012	Bari	28	(1)
2012–2015	Lecce	70	(20)
2015–2016	Martina Franca	16	(0)
2016–2019	Plaza Colonia	80	(1)
2019–2021	Deportivo Maldonado	40	(1)
- * Club domestic league appearances and goals as of 14:56, 7 October 2019 (UTC)

Mariano Adriàn Bogliacino (Italian pronunciation: [boʎʎaˈtʃino]; born 2 June 1980) is a Uruguayan former football midfielder who last played for Deportivo Maldonado. He is of Italian descent.

== Career ==
Bogliacino begun his career as a football player in his hometown team, Plaza Colonia. He showed great technical potential in the Uruguayan Premiership, playing as offensive midfielder, left wing ad half-back. After a short Spanish experience at Las Palmas (La Liga 2), Bogliacino moved to Italy, where he played for Sambenedettese in Serie C1 (the third level of Italian football) for two years.

He was a skilled half-back and scored twice against Napoli, which had just been relegated to the third category because of the team's failure. Napoli's manager, the wise and careful Pierpaolo Marino, immediately noticed the player. In the summer of 2005, Bogliacino was bought by Napoli. That year, Napoli won Serie C1 and Bogliacino became a more important player on the team. The trainer Edy Reja used Bogliacino both as left wing and as central midfielder. In June 2007, he signed a new 5-year contract with club.

== Personal life ==
He is married and has a daughter, Celeste, born in Naples. She is named after the national and club team's colour (in Spanish and Italian celeste means light blue).
