= 2005–06 Serie C1 =

Italian football league season

Geographical distribution of 2006-07 Serie C1 teams. Serie C1/A teams are depicted with red dots, whereas Serie C1/B ones were represented with yellow.

The 2005–06 Serie C1 was the twenty-eighth edition of Serie C1, the third highest league in the Italian football league system. It was divided into two phases: the regular season, played from 28 August 2005 to 7 May 2006, and the playoff phase. Once the regular season was over teams placed 2nd to 5th entered a playoff to determine the second team in each division to be promoted to Serie B. At the same time, teams placed 14th to 17th entered a playout for the right to remain in Serie C1 the following season.

As usual, Serie C1 was composed by two divisions, whose teams were divided geographically. Division C1/A was mainly composed by Northern Italy teams, with the exception of Salernitana, whereas Division C1/B included mostly Central and Southern Italy teams. The league featured also two former Italian national champions, Genoa and Napoli, both eventually achieving promotion in the end.

Teams finishing first in the regular season, plus one team winning the playoff round from each division were promoted to Serie B; teams finishing last in the regular season, plus two relegation playoff losers from each division were relegated to Serie C2. In all, four teams were promoted to Serie B, and six teams were relegated to Serie C2.

== Final standings ==
=== Serie C1/A ===
Pos	Team	Pld	W	D	L	GF	GA	GD	Pts	Promotion or relegation
1	Spezia (C, P)	34	17	12	5	42	22	+20	63	Promoted to the Serie B
2	Genoa (P)	34	15	14	5	42	27	+15	56 (Note: Genoa had 3 points deducted due to match fixing in the previous season)	Won promotion playoffs
3	Monza	34	14	14	6	35	25	+10	56	Lost to promotion playoffs
4	Pavia	34	15	9	10	44	29	+15	54	Lost to promotion playoffs
5	Salernitana	34	13	13	8	42	30	+12	52	Lost to promotion playoffs
6	Cittadella	34	14	8	12	38	33	+5	50	
7	Teramo	34	14	11	9	39	35	+4	49 (Note: Teramo had 4 points deducted due to financial irregularities)	
8	Novara	34	12	12	10	40	36	+4	48	
9	Padova	34	11	14	9	36	32	+4	47	
10	Pro Patria	34	10	14	10	36	39	−3	44	
11	Pizzighettone	34	9	16	9	37	32	+5	43	
12	Giulianova	34	10	13	11	33	33	0	43	
13	Ravenna	34	11	10	13	30	33	−3	43	
14	Pro Sesto	34	11	5	18	28	48	−20	38	Lost relegation playoff (Note: Pro Sesto reprieved from relegation to fill vacancies created.)
15	Sambenedettese	34	11	9	14	35	48	−13	36 (Note: Sambenedettese had 6 points deducted due to financial irregularities)	Won relegation playoff
16	Lumezzane (R)	34	9	8	17	35	44	−9	35	Lost relegation playoff
17	San Marino	34	8	11	15	32	38	−6	35	Won relegation playoff
18	Fermana (R)	34	2	7	25	18	58	−40	13	Relegated to the Serie D (Note: Fermana declared bankrupt and relegated to Serie D.)

(C) Champions; (P) Promoted; (R) Relegated

=== Serie C1/B ===
Pos	Team	Pld	W	D	L	GF	GA	GD	Pts	Promotion or relegation
1	Napoli (C, P)	34	19	11	4	48	20	+28	68	Promoted to the Serie B
2	Frosinone (P)	34	15	10	9	43	37	+6	55	Won promotion playoffs
3	Sassari Torres (R)	34	12	17	5	44	32	+12	53	Relegated to the Serie C2 (Note: Gela and Sassari Torres declared bankrupt and relegated to Serie C2.)
4	Grosseto	34	12	15	7	43	32	+11	51	Lost in promotion playoffs
5	Sangiovannese	34	12	15	7	37	34	+3	51	Lost in promotion playoffs
6	Perugia	34	14	8	12	35	37	−2	50	
7	Lucchese	34	13	10	11	33	27	+6	49	
8	Martina	34	13	8	13	41	39	+2	47	
9	Pistoiese	34	8	18	8	28	24	+4	42	
10	Manfredonia	34	10	12	12	36	38	−2	42	
11	Lanciano	34	10	11	13	36	35	+1	41	
12	Gela (R)	34	9	16	9	31	35	−4	41 (Note: Gela had 2 points deducted due to financial irregularities)	Relegated to the Serie C2
13	Foggia	34	8	16	10	32	32	0	40	
14	Acireale (R)	34	8	15	11	29	34	−5	39	Relegated to the Serie D (Note: Acireale and Chieti declared bankrupt and relegated to Serie D.)
15	Pisa	34	11	6	17	31	43	−12	39	Won relegation playoff
16	Massese	34	9	11	14	21	36	−15	38	Lost relegation playoff (Note: Massese reprieved from relegation to fill vacancies created.)
17	Juve Stabia	34	7	12	15	25	36	−11	33	Won relegation playoff
18	Chieti (R)	34	7	7	20	24	46	−22	28	Relegated to the Serie D

(C) Champions; (P) Promoted; (R) Relegated

== Promotion and relegation playoffs ==
=== Serie C1/A ===
==== Promotion ====
Promotion playoff semifinals
First legs played 28 May 2006; return legs played 4 June 2006

Team 1	Agg.	Team 2	1st leg	2nd leg
Salernitana (5)	3-3 (a)	(2) Genoa	2-1	1-2
Pavia (4)	1-3	(3) Monza	1-1	0-2

Promotion playoff finals
First leg played 11 June 2006; return leg played 18 June 2006

Team 1	Agg.	Team 2	1st leg	2nd leg
Monza (3)	1-2	(3) Genoa	0-2	1-0

Genoa promoted to Serie B

==== Relegation ====
Relegation playoffs
First legs played May 21, 2006; return legs played May 28, 2006

Team 1	Agg.	Team 2	1st leg	2nd leg
San Marino (17)	1-0	(14) Pro Sesto	1-0	0-0
Lumezzane (16)	3-5	(15) Sambenedettese	3-1	0-4

Pro Sesto and Lumezzane relegated to Serie C2

=== Serie C1/B ===
==== Promotion ====
Promotion playoff semifinals
First legs played May 21, 2006; return legs played May 28, 2006

Team 1	Agg.	Team 2	1st leg	2nd leg
Sangiovannese (5)	0-0	(2) Frosinone	0-0	0-0
Grosseto (4)	2-0	(3) Sassari Torres	1-0	1-0

Promotion playoff finals
First leg played June 4, 2006; return leg played June 11, 2006

Team 1	Agg.	Team 2	1st leg	2nd leg
Grosseto (4)	0-1	(2) Frosinone	0-0	0-1

Frosinone promoted to Serie B

==== Relegation ====
Relegation playoffs
First legs played 21 May 2006; return legs played 28 May 2006

Team 1	Agg.	Team 2	1st leg	2nd leg
Juve Stabia (17)	3-2	(14) Acireale	2-1	1-1
Massese (16)	2-2	(15) Pisa	2-1	0-1

Acireale and Massese relegated to Serie C2
