= 2010–11 SSC Napoli season =

Napoli
2010–11 season
- President: Aurelio De Laurentiis
- Manager: Walter Mazzarri
- Stadium: Stadio San Paolo
- Serie A: 3rd
- Coppa Italia: Quarter-finals
- UEFA Europa League: Round of 32
- Top goalscorer: League: Edinson Cavani (26); All: Edinson Cavani (33)
- Highest home attendance: 58,666 vs Juventus (9 January 2011, Serie A)
- Lowest home attendance: 26,931 vs Parma (7 November 2010, Serie A)
- Average home league attendance: 45,608
Home colours	Away colours	Third colours

Società Sportiva Calcio Napoli's 2010–11 season was its 65th in Serie A, and fourth consecutive year in the top flight. Napoli will also take part in the 2010–11 UEFA Europa League as a result of finishing 6th in the 2009–10 Serie A table, its highest in Serie A since it also finished 6th in 1993–94.

== Season review ==
Following the end of the World Cup, Napoli bought Edinson Cavani from fellow Southern club Palermo. He cost roughly €17 million for Napoli, and was the clubs' most expensive player ever bought. The club also loaned out playmaker Luca Cigarini to Sevilla, despite having the medical postponed due to illness.

== Players ==
=== Squad information ===
As of 1 September 2010

Note: Flags indicate national team as defined under FIFA eligibility rules; some limited exceptions apply. Players may hold more than one non-FIFA nationality.

No.	Pos.	Nation	Player
1	GK	ITA	Gennaro Iezzo
2	DF	ITA	Gianluca Grava
3	MF	ITA	Luigi Vitale
4	DF	ESP	Víctor Ruiz
5	MF	ITA	Michele Pazienza
6	DF	ITA	Salvatore Aronica
7	FW	URU	Edinson Cavani
8	DF	ITA	Andrea Dossena
9	FW	ITA	Giuseppe Mascara
11	MF	ITA	Christian Maggio
12	FW	ITA	Nicolao Dumitru
13	DF	ITA	Fabiano Santacroce
14	DF	ARG	Hugo Campagnaro
17	MF	SVK	Marek Hamšík
18	DF	COL	Juan Zúñiga
21	MF	ALG	Hassan Yebda (on loan from Benfica)
22	FW	ARG	Ezequiel Lavezzi
23	MF	URU	Walter Gargano
25	DF	BRA	Emílson Cribari

No.	Pos.	Nation	Player
26	GK	ITA	Morgan De Sanctis
28	DF	ITA	Paolo Cannavaro
33	GK	ITA	Matteo Gianello
77	MF	ARG	José Sosa
80	MF	ITA	Manuele Blasi
82	GK	ITA	Luigi Sepe
83	MF	ITA	Carlo Colella
84	DF	ITA	Walter Guerra
88	FW	ITA	Giuseppe Iuliano
91	MF	ITA	Raffaele Maiello
92	DF	ITA	Armando Izzo
93	MF	ITA	Daniele Donnarumma
94	DF	ITA	Diego Petrarca
95	MF	ITA	Francesco Simonetti
96	MF	ITA	Marco Eligibile
97	MF	ITA	Vincenzo Gatto
98	DF	ITA	Ciro Simonetti
99	FW	ITA	Cristiano Lucarelli (on loan from Parma)

== Transfers ==
=== In ===
Date	Pos.	Name	From	Fee
14 July 2010	FW	(Uruguay) Edinson Cavani	(Italy) Palermo	Loan^{1}
21 August 2010	FW	(Italy) Cristiano Lucarelli	(Italy) Parma	Loan
27 August 2010	MF	(Algeria) Hassan Yebda	(Portugal) Benfica	Loan
30 August 2010	MF	(Argentina) José Sosa	(Germany) Bayern Munich	€2 million
31 August 2010	DF	(Brazil) Emílson Cribari	(Italy) Lazio	€500,000

1.Napoli will pay a fee of €17 million to purchase Cavani outright when loan expires.

=== Out ===
Date	Pos.	Name	To	Fee
5 July 2010	DF	(Italy) Matteo Contini	(Spain) Real Zaragoza	Undisclosed
24 July 2010	GK	(Argentina) Nicolás Navarro	(Argentina) Argentinos Juniors	Free
17 August 2010	FW	(Argentina) Germán Denis	(Italy) Udinese	Undisclosed
25 August 2010	FW	(Uruguay) Marcelo Zalayeta	(Turkey) Kayserispor	Free
31 August 2010	MF	(Italy) Roberto De Zerbi	(Romania) CFR Cluj	Free

=== Loan out ===
Date from	Date to	Pos.	Name	To
8 July 2010	Conclusion of season	MF	(Argentina) Jesús Dátolo	(Spain) Espanyol
15 July 2010	Conclusion of season	FW	(Austria) Erwin Hoffer	(Germany) 1. FC Kaiserslautern
22 July 2010	Conclusion of season^{2}	MF	(Uruguay) Mariano Bogliacino	(Italy) Chievo
2 August 2010	Conclusion of season	MF	(Italy) Luca Cigarini	(Spain) Sevilla
17 August 2010	Conclusion of season	MF	(Uruguay) Nicolás Amodio	(Italy) Portosummaga
27 August 2010	Conclusion of season^{3}	FW	(Italy) Fabio Quagliarella	(Italy) Juventus
31 August 2010	Conclusion of season^{4}	DF	(Italy) Leandro Rinaudo	(Italy) Juventus
31 August 2010	Conclusion of season	MF	(Italy) Samuele Dalla Bona	(Italy) Atalanta
		FW	(Italy) Luca Giannone	(Italy) Matera

2.Chievo has an option to purchase Bogliacino outright when deal expires.
3.Juventus paid €4.5 million for the loan, and is expected to purchase Quagliarella outright when deal expires.
4.Juventus paid €600,000 for the loan, and has an option to purchase Rinaudo outright for €5 million when loan expires.

== Competitions ==
=== Serie A ===
==== League table ====
Pos	Team	Pld	W	D	L	GF	GA	GD	Pts	Qualification or relegation
1	Milan (C)	38	24	10	4	65	24	+41	82	Qualification to Champions League group stage
2	Internazionale	38	23	7	8	69	42	+27	76	Qualification to Champions League group stage
3	Napoli	38	21	7	10	59	39	+20	70	Qualification to Champions League group stage
4	Udinese	38	20	6	12	65	43	+22	66 (Note: Udinese finished ahead of Lazio on head-to-head away goals scored: Udinese 2–1 Lazio, Lazio 3–2 Udinese.)	Qualification to Champions League play-off round
5	Lazio	38	20	6	12	55	39	+16	66	Qualification to Europa League play-off round (Note: As Internazionale won the 2010–11 Coppa Italia and already qualified for the Champions League, Palermo entered the 2011–12 UEFA Europa League third qualification round as the cup runners-up.)

Source: Lega Serie A
Rules for classification: 1) points; 2) head-to-head points; 3) head-to-head goal difference; 4) head-to-head goals scored; 5) goal difference; 6) number of goals scored.
(C) Champions

==== Results summary ====
Overall								Home						Away					
Pld	W	D	L	GF	GA	GD	Pts	W	D	L	GF	GA	GD	W	D	L	GF	GA	GD
38	21	7	10	59	39	+20	70	12	4	3	33	15	+18	9	3	7	26	24	+2

Last updated: 22 May 2011.
Source: Competitive matches

==== Results by round ====
Round	1	2	3	4	5	6	7	8	9	10	11	12	13	14	15	16	17	18	19	20	21	22	23	24	25	26	27	28	29	30	31	32	33	34	35	36	37	38
Ground	A	H	A	H	A	H	A	H	A	H	A	A	H	A	H	A	H	A	H	H	A	H	A	H	A	H	A	H	A	H	H	A	H	A	H	A	H	A
Result	D	D	W	L	W	W	D	L	W	W	W	L	W	L	W	W	W	L	W	D	W	W	L	W	W	W	L	D	W	W	W	W	L	L	W	L	D	D
Position	8	14	7	11	6	3	4	6	5	5	3	3	3	4	4	3	2	3	2	3	2	2	3	3	2	2	3	3	3	3	2	2	2	3	3	3	3	3

Updated to match(es) played on 22 May 2011. Source: Competitive matches
A = Away; H = Home; W = Win; D = Draw; L = Loss

==== Matches ====
29 August 2010 1	Fiorentina	1–1	Napoli	Florence
20:45 CEST (UTC+02:00)	Krøldrup (yellow card) 16'; D'Agostino 49'; Vargas (red card) 67'; Zanetti (yellow card) 80'	Report	Cavani 7', (yellow card) 55'; Lavezzi (yellow card) 24'; Blasi (yellow card) 54' (yellow-red card) 73'; Campagnaro (yellow card) 67'; Hamšík (yellow card) 78'	Stadium: Stadio Artemio Franchi; Attendance: 25,025; Referee: Andrea Gervasoni

12 September 2010 2	Napoli	2–2	Bari	Naples
20:45 CEST (UTC+02:00)	Cavani 30'; Hamšík (yellow card) 33'; Cannavaro 87'	Report	Barreto 12'; Álvarez (yellow card) 33'; Donati (yellow card) 56'; Almirón (yellow card) 64'; Castillo 88'; Parisi (yellow card) 90+1'	Stadium: Stadio San Paolo; Attendance: 27,214; Referee: Andrea De Marco

19 September 2010 3	Sampdoria	1–2	Napoli	Genoa
20:45 CEST (UTC+02:00)	Lucchini (yellow card) 10'; Cassano 78' (pen.); Gastaldello (yellow card) 83'; Mannini (yellow card) 90+3'	Report	Campagnaro (yellow card) 38'; Lavezzi (yellow card) 51'; Grava (yellow card) 56'; Hamšík (yellow card) 72', (goal) 83'; Cannavaro (yellow card) 77'; Gargano (yellow card) 79'; Pazienza (yellow card) 80'; Cavani 86'	Stadium: Stadio Luigi Ferraris; Attendance: 23,566; Referee: Paolo Valeri

22 September 2010 4	Napoli	1–3	Chievo	Naples
20:45 CEST (UTC+02:00)	Cannavaro 6', (yellow card) 65'	Report	Pellissier 22', 74'; Fernandes 58', (yellow card) 72'	Stadium: Stadio San Paolo; Attendance: 46,037; Referee: Antonio Danilo Giannoccaro

26 September 2010 5	Cesena	1–4	Napoli	Cesena
12:30 CEST (UTC+02:00)	Parolo 48'; Schelotto (yellow card) 68'; Lauro (yellow card) 80'	Report	Pazienza (yellow card) 49'; Lavezzi 72'; Hamšík 81' (pen.); Cavani 88', 90+2'	Stadium: Stadio Dino Manuzzi; Attendance: 16,250; Referee: Antonio Damato

3 October 2010 6	Napoli	2–0	Roma	Naples
15:00 CEST (UTC+02:00)	Pazienza (yellow card) 26'; Gargano (yellow card) 53'; Lavezzi (yellow card) 54'; Hamšík 72'; Aronica (yellow card) 81'; Juan 83' (o.g.)	Report	Cassetti (yellow card) 48'; Pizarro (yellow card) 61'	Stadium: Stadio San Paolo; Attendance: 44,782; Referee: Paolo Tagliavento

17 October 2010 7	Catania	1–1	Napoli	Catania
15:00 CEST (UTC+02:00)	Gómez 69'; López (yellow card) 74'	Report	Dossena (yellow card) 33'; Cavani 39'; De Sanctis (yellow card) 87'; Cannavaro (red card) 90+4'	Stadium: Stadio Angelo Massimino; Attendance: 13,136; Referee: Mauro Bergonzi

25 October 2010 8	Napoli	1–2	Milan	Naples
20:45 CEST (UTC+02:00)	Pazienza (yellow card) 37' (yellow-red card) 45+1'; Lavezzi 78'; Aronica (yellow card) 82'	Report	Robinho 22', (yellow card) 65'; Papastathopoulos (yellow card) 28'; Ibrahimović 71'; Boateng (yellow card) 81'; Bonera (yellow card) 89'	Stadium: Stadio San Paolo; Attendance: 53,909; Referee: Nicola Rizzoli

31 October 2010 9	Brescia	0–1	Napoli	Brescia
15:00 CET (UTC+01:00)	Córdova (yellow card) 48'	Report	Gargano (yellow card) 43'; Lavezzi 77'	Stadium: Stadio Mario Rigamonti; Attendance: 6,008; Referee: Paolo Valeri

7 November 2010 10	Napoli	2–0	Parma	Naples
15:00 CET (UTC+01:00)	Cavani 19', 86'; Vitale (yellow card) 59'; Grava (yellow card) 75'	Report	Marqués (yellow card) 76'	Stadium: Stadio San Paolo; Attendance: 26,931; Referee: Paolo Mazzoleni

10 November 2010 11	Cagliari	0–1	Napoli	Cagliari
20:45 CET (UTC+01:00)	Cossu (yellow card) 32'; Nainggolan (yellow card) 74'; Biondini (yellow card) 88'; Pinardi (yellow card) 90+1'	Report	Yebda (yellow card) 70'; Gargano (yellow card) 87'; Lavezzi 90+4'	Stadium: Stadio Sant'Elia; Attendance: 13,000; Referee: Gianluca Rocchi

14 November 2010 12	Lazio	2–0	Napoli	Rome
12:30 CET (UTC+01:00)	Zárate 15'; Dias (yellow card) 52'; Floccari 61'	Report	Grava (yellow card) 57'; Campagnaro (yellow card) 70'; Sosa (yellow card) 89'	Stadium: Stadio Olimpico; Attendance: 24,487; Referee: Mauro Bergonzi

21 November 2010 13	Napoli	4–1	Bologna	Naples
20:45 CET (UTC+01:00)	Maggio 2'; Hamšík 36', 48'; Cavani 74'	Report	Meggiorini 68'	Stadium: Stadio San Paolo; Attendance: 27,806; Referee: Andrea Gervasoni

28 November 2010 14	Udinese	3–1	Napoli	Udine
15:00 CET (UTC+01:00)	Di Natale 16' (pen.), 45', 57'; Pinzi (yellow card) 67'; Benatia (yellow card) 77'; Domizzi (yellow card) 80'	Report	De Sanctis (yellow card) 15'; Maggio (yellow card) 33'; Cannavaro (yellow card) 44'; Hamšík 58'; Gargano (yellow card) 67'	Stadium: Stadio Friuli; Attendance: 15,087; Referee: Andrea Romeo

6 December 2010 15	Napoli	1–0	Palermo	Naples
20:45 CET (UTC+01:00)	Grava (yellow card) 53'; Aronica (yellow card) 87'; Maggio 90+5'	Report	Goian (yellow card) 20'; Cassani (yellow card) 90+1'	Stadium: Stadio San Paolo; Attendance: 36,487; Referee: Emidio Morganti

11 December 2010 16	Genoa	0–1	Napoli	Genoa
20:45 CET (UTC+01:00)	Veloso (yellow card) 37'	Report	Hamšík 25'; Campagnaro (yellow card) 31'; Zúñiga (yellow card) 40'; Pazienza (yellow card) 72' (yellow-red card) 85'; Cannavaro (yellow card) 88'	Stadium: Stadio Luigi Ferraris; Attendance: 24,288; Referee: Christian Brighi

19 December 2010 17	Napoli	1–0	Lecce	Naples
15:00 CET (UTC+01:00)	Gargano (yellow card) 56'; Santacroce (yellow card) 61'; Cavani 90+3', (yellow card) 90+4'	Report	Fabiano (yellow card) 25'	Stadium: Stadio San Paolo; Attendance: 32,293; Referee: Domenico Celi

6 January 2011 18	Internazionale	3–1	Napoli	Milan
20:45 CET (UTC+01:00)	Motta 3', 55'; Chivu (yellow card) 6'; Zanetti (yellow card) 21'; Cambiasso 37'; Maicon (yellow card) 81'	Report	Aronica (yellow card) 11'; Pazienza 25'; Campagnaro (yellow card) 68'	Stadium: San Siro; Attendance: 60,515; Referee: Gianluca Rocchi

9 January 2011 19	Napoli	3–0	Juventus	Naples
20:45 CET (UTC+01:00)	Cavani 20', 26', 53'; Dossena (yellow card) 45'; Hamšík (yellow card) 55'; Maggio (yellow card) 57'	Report	Traoré (yellow card) 41'; Pepe (yellow card) 60'	Stadium: Stadio San Paolo; Attendance: 58,666; Referee: Emidio Morganti

15 January 2011 20	Napoli	0–0	Fiorentina	Naples
18:00 CET (UTC+01:00)	Campagnaro (yellow card) 86'	Report		Stadium: Stadio San Paolo; Attendance: 49,443; Referee: Luca Banti

23 January 2011 21	Bari	0–2	Napoli	Bari
15:00 CET (UTC+01:00)	Parisi (yellow card) 42' (yellow-red card) 67'; Raggi (yellow card) 44'	Report	Lavezzi 38'; Campagnaro (yellow card) 79'; Cavani 87'	Stadium: Stadio San Nicola; Attendance: 17,879; Referee: Paolo Mazzoleni

30 January 2011 22	Napoli	4–0	Sampdoria	Naples
15:00 CET (UTC+01:00)	Cavani 16', 45' (pen.), 57'; Yebda (yellow card) 24'; Hamšík 48'; Lavezzi (yellow card) 51'	Report	Tissone (yellow card) 38'; Volta (yellow card) 41'; Accardi (yellow card) 44'; Poli (yellow card) 82'	Stadium: Stadio San Paolo; Attendance: 36,264; Referee: Gianluca Rocchi

2 February 2011 23	Chievo	2–0	Napoli	Verona
20:45 CET (UTC+01:00)	Moscardelli 20'; Rigoni (yellow card) 32'; Sardo 50', (yellow card) 51'	Report	Pazienza (yellow card) 53'; Cavani (yellow card) 69'; Cannavaro (yellow card) 86'	Stadium: Stadio Marc'Antonio Bentegodi; Attendance: 11,610; Referee: Daniele Orsato

6 February 2011 24	Napoli	2–0	Cesena	Naples
15:00 CET (UTC+01:00)	Cavani 13'; Maggio (yellow card) 43'; Santacroce (yellow card) 80'; Sosa 90+1'	Report	Jiménez (yellow card) 90+3'	Stadium: Stadio San Paolo; Attendance: 34,565; Referee: Domenico Celi

12 February 2011 25	Roma	0–2	Napoli	Rome
20:45 CET (UTC+01:00)	Rosi (yellow card) 22'; Juan (yellow card) 48'; De Rossi (yellow card) 54'; Perrotta (yellow card) 58'; Cassetti (yellow card) 82'	Report	Lavezzi (yellow card) 22'; Aronica (yellow card) 30'; Dossena (yellow card) 45+1'; Cavani 49' (pen.), 83'; Campagnaro (yellow card) 80'	Stadium: Stadio Olimpico; Attendance: 32,354; Referee: Mauro Bergonzi

20 February 2011 26	Napoli	1–0	Catania	Naples
20:45 CET (UTC+01:00)	Yebda (yellow card) 16'; Zúñiga 25'; Hamšík (yellow card) 41'; Santacroce (yellow card) 60'	Report	Andújar (yellow card) 26'; Bergessio (yellow card) 60'; Spolli (yellow card) 72'	Stadium: Stadio San Paolo; Attendance: 35,602; Referee: Gabriele Gava

28 February 2011 27	Milan	3–0	Napoli	Milan
20:45 CET (UTC+01:00)	Pato (yellow card) 44', (goal) 79'; Ibrahimović 49' (pen.); Boateng 77', (yellow card) 77'	Report	Aronica (yellow card) 48'; Gargano (yellow card) 70'	Stadium: San Siro; Attendance: 77,276; Referee: Gianluca Rocchi

6 March 2011 28	Napoli	0–0	Brescia	Naples
15:00 CET (UTC+01:00)	Dossena (yellow card) 52'; Aronica (yellow card) 74'; Cannavaro (yellow card) 90+2'	Report	Hetemaj (yellow card) 39'; Mareco (yellow card) 53'; Diamanti (yellow card) 73'; Accardi (yellow card) 79'	Stadium: Stadio San Paolo; Attendance: 29,146; Referee: Paolo Mazzoleni

13 March 2011 29	Parma	1–3	Napoli	Parma
20:45 CET (UTC+01:00)	Palladino 29'; Modesto (yellow card) 35'; Lucarelli (yellow card) 38'; Galloppa (red card) 59'; Valiani (yellow card) 80'	Report	Hamšík 52'; Maggio (yellow card) 55', (goal) 87'; Lavezzi 56'; Cannavaro (yellow card) 66'	Stadium: Stadio Ennio Tardini; Attendance: 16,273; Referee: Emidio Morganti

20 March 2011 30	Napoli	2–1	Cagliari	Naples
20:45 CET (UTC+01:00)	Cavani 49' (pen.), 61'; Lavezzi (yellow card) 86'	Report	Conti (yellow card) 26'; Ariaudo (yellow card) 48'; Acquafresca 56'; Biondini (yellow card) 87'	Stadium: Stadio San Paolo; Attendance: 44,497; Referee: Antonio Damato

3 April 2011 31	Napoli	4–3	Lazio	Naples
12:30 CEST (UTC+02:00)	Dossena (yellow card) 34', (goal) 60'; Cavani 62', 82' (pen.), 88', (yellow card) 90+2'; Campagnaro (yellow card) 87'	Report	Dias (yellow card) 24', (goal) 56'; Mauri 29'; Aronica 68' (o.g.); Sculli (yellow card) 69'; Biava (red card) 80'	Stadium: Stadio San Paolo; Attendance: 57,155; Referee: Luca Banti

10 April 2011 32	Bologna	0–2	Napoli	Bologna
15:00 CEST (UTC+02:00)	Morleo (yellow card) 14'; Ekdal (yellow card) 37'; Viviano (yellow card) 45+1'; Pérez (yellow card) 89'	Report	Campagnaro (yellow card) 15'; Ruiz (yellow card) 26'; Mascara 30', (yellow card) 30'; Lavezzi (yellow card) 41'; Hamšík 45+2' (pen.)	Stadium: Stadio Renato Dall'Ara; Attendance: 33,092; Referee: Daniele Orsato

17 April 2011 33	Napoli	1–2	Udinese	Naples
20:45 CEST (UTC+02:00)	Pazienza (yellow card) 42'; Lavezzi (yellow card) 69'; Cannavaro (yellow card) 79'; Mascara 90+6'	Report	Asamoah (yellow card) 13'; Inler 55'; Denis 61'; Handanović (yellow card) 70'; Domizzi (red card) 87'	Stadium: Stadio San Paolo; Attendance: 56,757; Referee: Paolo Tagliavento

23 April 2011 34	Palermo	2–1	Napoli	Palermo
15:00 CEST (UTC+02:00)	Cassani (yellow card) 1'; Balzaretti (yellow card) 14', (goal) 38'; Nocerino (yellow card) 35'; Bovo 45+1' (pen.), (yellow card) 90+3'	Report	Cavani 2' (pen.); Pazienza (yellow card) 31'; Mascara (yellow card) 37'	Stadium: Stadio Renzo Barbera; Attendance: 26,778; Referee: Antonio Damato

30 April 2011 35	Napoli	1–0	Genoa	Naples
20:45 CEST (UTC+02:00)	Gargano (yellow card) 74'; Hamšík 83'; Mascara (yellow card) 90+2'	Report	Rafinha (yellow card) 61'	Stadium: Stadio San Paolo; Attendance: 52,495; Referee: Gabriele Gava

8 May 2011 36	Lecce	2–1	Napoli	Lecce
15:00 CEST (UTC+02:00)	Giacomazzi (yellow card) 38'; Corvia 49' (pen.), (yellow card) 44' (yellow-red card) 54'; Chevantón 88', (yellow card) 89'	Report	Maggio (yellow card) 27'; Mascara 67', (yellow card) 79'; Cavani (yellow card) 59' (yellow-red card) 74'; De Sanctis (yellow card) 88'	Stadium: Stadio Via del Mare; Attendance: 14,406; Referee: Paolo Valeri

15 May 2011 37	Napoli	1–1	Internazionale	Naples
20:45 CEST (UTC+02:00)	Zúñiga 45+1', (yellow card) 45+1'	Report	Eto'o 15'	Stadium: Stadio San Paolo; Attendance: 57,400; Referee: Andrea De Marco

22 May 2011 38	Juventus	2–2	Napoli	Turin
20:45 CEST (UTC+02:00)	Chiellini (yellow card) 26', (goal) 47'; Marchisio (yellow card) 57'; Barzagli (yellow card) 82'; Matri 84'	Report	Maggio 22'; Ruiz (yellow card) 44'; Mascara (yellow card) 60'; Gargano (yellow card) 66'; Lucarelli 70'	Stadium: Stadio Olimpico di Torino; Attendance: 23,389; Referee: Nicola Rizzoli

=== Coppa Italia ===
Napoli qualified into the Round of 16 in the 2010–11 Coppa Italia by finishing sixth in the previous year's table, marking the first time since 1994–95 Napoli have entered the tournament at that stage. Napoli aim for its fourth victory in the national competition, and first since its 1986–87 finals win against Atalanta.

18 January 2011 Round of 16	Napoli	2–1	Bologna	Naples
21:00 CET (UTC+01:00)	Yebda 9'; Lavezzi 23', (yellow card) 24'; Cribari (yellow card) 55'	Report	Meggiorini 56' (pen.); Esposito (yellow card) 83'; Mutarelli (yellow card) 88'	Stadium: Stadio San Paolo; Attendance: 33,806; Referee: Andrea Romeo

26 January 2011 Quarter-finals	Napoli	0–0 (a.e.t.) (4–5 p)	Internazionale	Naples
20:45 CET (UTC+01:00)	Cannavaro (yellow card) 26'; Cavani (yellow card) 97'	Report	Motta (yellow card) 41'; Lúcio (yellow card) 111'	Stadium: Stadio San Paolo; Attendance: 40,580; Referee: Paolo Valeri
	Penalties
	Cavani (penalty scored); Hamšík (penalty scored); Lavezzi (penalty missed); Zúñiga (penalty scored); Yebda (penalty scored)		(penalty scored) Eto'o; (penalty scored) Cambiasso; (penalty scored) Pandev; (penalty scored) Motta; (penalty scored) Chivu

=== UEFA Europa League ===
Napoli qualified to the play-off round of the 2010–11 UEFA Europa League by finishing 6th in Serie A in 2009–10. This marks Napoli's first appearance in the competition since the 1994–95 UEFA Cup, under its previous name, and 13th overall. Napoli aim to add to its only triumph in the competition: its 1988–89 UEFA Cup victory over VfB Stuttgart.

==== Play-off round ====
Napoli were drawn against Swedish side IF Elfsborg of the Allsvenskan, who advanced through defeats of FC Iskra-Stal and FK Teteks in the previous qualifying rounds. Hosting the first leg at the Stadio San Paolo, Napoli survived on a clear-path goal by Ezequiel Lavezzi in first half stoppage time, taking a 1-0 lead to Sweden.

Edinson Cavani, kept off the scoresheet in his debut with Napoli, hoped for better fortunes in the return leg of the matchup. Indeed, he scored his first two goals as a member of the club to help go up 3–0 on aggregate through halftime in Sweden. Napoli would go on to win by that score, and advance to the group stage.

19 August 2010 First leg	Napoli (Italy)	1–0	(Sweden) Elfsborg	Naples, Italy
21:00 CEST (UTC+02:00)	Pazienza (yellow card) 37'; Lavezzi 45+1'; Aronica (yellow card) 84'	Report	Lučić (yellow card) 8'; Jönsson (yellow card) 27'; Florén (yellow card) 29'	Stadium: Stadio San Paolo; Attendance: 35,534; Referee: Anastassios Kakos (Greece)

26 August 2010 Second leg	Elfsborg (Sweden)	0–2 (0–3 agg.)	(Italy) Napoli	Borås, Sweden
20:45 CEST (UTC+02:00)	Larsson (yellow card) 67'	Report	Cavani 29', 38', (yellow card) 41'; Lavezzi (yellow card) 45+2'	Stadium: Borås Arena; Attendance: 16,000; Referee: Saïd Ennjimi (France)

==== Group stage ====
Pos	Team	Pld	W	D	L	GF	GA	GD	Pts	Qualification
1	(England) Liverpool	6	2	4	0	8	3	+5	10	Advance to knockout phase
2	(Italy) Napoli	6	1	4	1	8	9	−1	7	Advance to knockout phase
3	(Romania) Steaua București	6	1	3	2	9	11	−2	6	
4	(Netherlands) Utrecht	6	0	5	1	5	7	−2	5	

Source: Soccerway

16 September 2010 1	Napoli (Italy)	0–0	(Netherlands) Utrecht	Naples, Italy
21:05 CEST (UTC+02:00)	Yebda (yellow card) 54'; Cavani (yellow card) 62'; Gargano (yellow card) 80'; Maggio (yellow card) 83'; Santacroce (yellow card) 90+1'	Report	Van Wolfswinkel (yellow card) 23'; Demouge (yellow card) 37'; Silberbauer (yellow card) 42'	Stadium: Stadio San Paolo; Attendance: 27,897; Referee: István Vad (Hungary)

30 September 2010 2	Steaua București (Romania)	3–3	(Italy) Napoli	Bucharest, Romania
19:00 CEST (UTC+02:00)	Cribari 2' (o.g.); Tǎnase 11'; Kapetanos 16', (red card) 31'; Tătărușanu (yellow card) 63'; Latovlevici (yellow card) 90+8'; Nicoliţă (yellow card) 90+8'	Report	Vitale 44'; Lavezzi (yellow card) 54'; Hamšík 73'; Gargano (yellow card) 90+1'; Cavani 90+8'	Stadium: Stadionul Steaua; Attendance: 10,033; Referee: Marcin Borski (Poland)

21 October 2010 3	Napoli (Italy)	0–0	(England) Liverpool	Naples, Italy
19:00 CEST (UTC+02:00)	Pazienza (yellow card) 56'	Report	Škrtel (yellow card) 28'	Stadium: Stadio San Paolo; Attendance: 52,910; Referee: Thorsten Kinhöfer (Germany)

4 November 2010 4	Liverpool (England)	3–1	(Italy) Napoli	Liverpool, England
21:05 CET (UTC+01:00)	Johnson (yellow card) 25'; Kyrgiakos (yellow card) 67'; Gerrard 76', 88' (pen.), 89'	Report	Lavezzi 28'; Dossena (yellow card) 47'; Campagnaro (yellow card) 67'; De Sanctis (yellow card) 76'; Cavani (yellow card) 90+3'	Stadium: Anfield; Attendance: 33,895; Referee: Fredy Fautrel (France)

2 December 2010 5	Utrecht (Netherlands)	3–3	(Italy) Napoli	Utrecht, Netherlands
19:00 CET (UTC+01:00)	Van Wolfswinkel 6', 28' (pen.), (yellow card) 75'; Demouge 35', (yellow card) 78'; Nijholt (yellow card) 83'	Report	Cavani 5', 42', 70' (pen.); Campagnaro (yellow card) 34'; Hamšík (yellow card) 49'; De Sanctis (yellow card) 78'; Zúñiga (yellow card) 79'; Yebda (yellow card) 83'; Lavezzi (yellow card) 83'; Gargano (yellow card) 83'	Stadium: Stadion Galgenwaard; Attendance: 22,500; Referee: Eduardo Iturralde González (Spain)

15 December 2010 6	Napoli (Italy)	1–0	(Romania) Steaua București	Naples, Italy
21:05 CET (UTC+01:00)	Maggio (yellow card) 73'; Cannavaro (yellow card) 76' (yellow-red card) 90+6'; Cavani 90+3'; Zúñiga (yellow card) 90+4'	Report	Székely (yellow card) 11'; Bonfim (yellow card) 66'; Gomes (yellow card) 76'; Surdu (yellow card) 81'; Martinović (yellow card) 90+6'	Stadium: Stadio San Paolo; Attendance: 40,631; Referee: Pavel Královec (Czech Republic)

==== Knockout phase ====
===== Round of 32 =====
17 February 2011 First leg	Napoli (Italy)	0–0	(Spain) Villarreal	Naples, Italy
19:00 CET (UTC+01:00)	Dossena (yellow card) 47'; Cribari (yellow card) 90+2'; Aronica (yellow card) 64' (yellow-red card) 90+5'	Report	Capdevila (yellow card) 29'; Rodríguez (yellow card) 36'; Marchena (yellow card) 89'	Stadium: Stadio San Paolo; Attendance: 47,529; Referee: Mark Clattenburg (England)

24 February 2011 Second leg	Villarreal (Spain)	2–1	(Italy) Napoli	Villarreal, Spain
21:05 CET (UTC+01:00)	Musacchio (yellow card) 41'; Nilmar 42', (yellow card) 74'; Rossi 45+1'; Cazorla (yellow card) 60'; Capdevila (yellow card) 65'	Report	Hamšík 18', (yellow card) 76'; De Sanctis (yellow card) 45+2'; Yebda (yellow card) 45+2'; Ruiz (yellow card) 52'; Campagnaro (yellow card) 61'	Stadium: El Madrigal; Attendance: 21,061; Referee: Cüneyt Çakır (Turkey)

== Statistics ==
=== Appearances and goals ===
No.	Pos	Nat	Player	Total		Serie A		Coppa Italia		Europa League	
No.	Pos	Nat	Player	Apps	Goals	Apps	Goals	Apps	Goals	Apps	Goals
Goalkeepers
1	GK	(Italy) ITA	Gennaro Iezzo	1	0	0	0	1	0	0	0
26	GK	(Italy) ITA	Morgan De Sanctis	49	0	38	0	1	0	10	0
33	GK	(Italy) ITA	Matteo Gianello	0	0	0	0	0	0	0	0
Defenders
2	DF	(Italy) ITA	Gianluca Grava	17	0	13	0	0	0	4	0
4	DF	(Spain) ESP	Víctor Ruiz	7	0	6	0	0	0	1	0
6	DF	(Italy) ITA	Salvatore Aronica	35	0	26	0	2	0	7	0
8	DF	(Italy) ITA	Andrea Dossena	42	1	33	1	1	0	8	0
11	DF	(Italy) ITA	Christian Maggio	44	4	33	4	2	0	9	0
13	DF	(Italy) ITA	Fabiano Santacroce	14	0	11	0	1	0	2	0
14	DF	(Argentina) ARG	Hugo Campagnaro	39	0	31	0	1	0	7	0
18	DF	(Colombia) COL	Juan Zúñiga	36	2	27	2	1	0	8	0
25	DF	(Brazil) BRA	Emílson Cribari	14	0	9	0	1	0	4	0
28	DF	(Italy) ITA	Paolo Cannavaro	40	2	32	2	1	0	7	0
Midfielders
3	MF	(Italy) ITA	Luigi Vitale	10	1	6	0	1	0	3	1
5	MF	(Italy) ITA	Michele Pazienza	39	1	31	1	1	0	7	0
17	MF	(Slovakia) SVK	Marek Hamšík	49	13	37	11	2	0	10	2
21	MF	(Algeria) ALG	Hassan Yebda	39	1	29	0	2	1	8	0
23	MF	(Uruguay) URU	Walter Gargano	46	0	36	0	1	0	9	0
77	MF	(Argentina) ARG	José Sosa	31	1	24	1	1	0	6	0
80	MF	(Italy) ITA	Manuele Blasi	5	0	2	0	1	0	2	0
91	MF	(Italy) ITA	Raffaele Maiello	3	0	3	0	0	0	0	0
Forwards
7	FW	(Uruguay) URU	Edinson Cavani	47	33	35	26	2	0	10	7
9	FW	(Italy) ITA	Giuseppe Mascara	16	3	14	3	0	0	2	0
12	FW	(Italy) ITA	Nicolao Dumitru	12	0	9	0	0	0	3	0
22	FW	(Argentina) ARG	Ezequiel Lavezzi	42	9	31	6	2	1	9	2
99	FW	(Italy) ITA	Cristiano Lucarelli	11	1	9	1	1	0	1	0
Players transferred out during the season
27	FW	(Italy) ITA	Fabio Quagliarella	1	0	0	0	0	0	1	0

Last updated: 15 January 2016
Source: Competitions

=== Goalscorers ===
Rank	No.	Pos	Nat	Name	Serie A	Coppa Italia	UEFA EL	Total
Own goal					0	0	0	0
Totals					0	0	0	0

Last updated: 6 January 2016
