= 2009–10 SSC Napoli season =

Napoli
2009–10 season
- Chairman: Aurelio De Laurentiis
- Manager: Roberto Donadoni (until 5 October); Walter Mazzarri (from 6 October)
- Stadium: Stadio San Paolo
- Serie A: 6th
- Coppa Italia: Round of 16
- Top goalscorer: League: Marek Hamšík (12); All: Marek Hamšík (12)
- Highest home attendance: 56.211 vs Inter (14 February 2010)
- Lowest home attendance: 23.209 vs Siena (27 September 2009)
- Average home league attendance: 40.797
| Home colours | Away colours | Third colours |

The 2009–10 SSC Napoli season was the club's 67th season in Serie A, its third consecutive season in Serie A and its 83rd season overall.

== Squad ==
As of 31 August 2009

Note: Flags indicate national team as defined under FIFA eligibility rules; some limited exceptions apply. Players may hold more than one non-FIFA nationality.

| No. | Pos. | Nation | Player |
|---|---|---|---|
| 1 | GK | ITA | Gennaro Iezzo |
| 2 | DF | ITA | Gianluca Grava |
| 5 | MF | ITA | Michele Pazienza |
| 6 | DF | ITA | Salvatore Aronica |
| 7 | FW | ARG | Ezequiel Lavezzi |
| 8 | MF | ITA | Manuele Blasi |
| 9 | FW | AUT | Erwin Hoffer |
| 11 | MF | ITA | Christian Maggio |
| 12 | FW | BRA | Piá |
| 13 | DF | ITA | Fabiano Santacroce |
| 14 | DF | ARG | Hugo Campagnaro |
| 15 | MF | ARG | Jesús Dátolo |
| 16 | DF | COL | Juan Camilo Zúñiga |

| No. | Pos. | Nation | Player |
|---|---|---|---|
| 17 | MF | SVK | Marek Hamšík |
| 18 | MF | URU | Mariano Bogliacino |
| 19 | FW | ARG | Germán Denis |
| 21 | MF | ITA | Luca Cigarini |
| 22 | GK | ITA | Matteo Gianello |
| 23 | MF | URU | Walter Gargano |
| 26 | GK | ITA | Morgan De Sanctis |
| 27 | FW | ITA | Fabio Quagliarella |
| 28 | DF | ITA | Paolo Cannavaro (captain) |
| 32 | MF | URU | Nicolás Amodio |
| 33 | DF | ITA | Erminio Rullo |
| 77 | DF | ITA | Leandro Rinaudo |
| 96 | DF | ITA | Matteo Contini |

=== Transfers ===
==== In ====
| Date | Pos. | Name | From | Fee |
|---|---|---|---|---|
| 1 July 2009 | MF | (Italy) Roberto De Zerbi | (Italy) Avellino | End of loan |
| 1 July 2009 | DF | (Italy) Erminio Rullo | (Italy) Triestina | End of loan |
| 1 June 2009 | FW | (Italy) Fabio Quagliarella | (Italy) Udinese | €18.75 million |
| 3 July 2009 | MF | (Italy) Luca Cigarini | (Italy) Atalanta | €12 million |
| 9 July 2009 | DF | (Argentina) Hugo Campagnaro | (Italy) Sampdoria | €5 million and joint-ownership of Daniele Mannini |
| 9 July 2009 | MF | (Colombia) Juan Camilo Zúñiga | (Italy) Siena | €8.5 million |
| 24 July 2009 | GK | (Italy) Morgan De Sanctis | (Spain) Sevilla | €1.5 million |
| 28 July 2009 | FW | (Austria) Erwin Hoffer | (Austria) Rapid Wien | €5.5 million |
| 8 January 2010 | DF | (Italy) Andrea Dossena | (England) Liverpool | €4.25 million |

==== Out ====
| Date | Pos. | Name | To | Fee |
|---|---|---|---|---|
| 8 June 2009 | DF | (Austria) György Garics | (Italy) Atalanta | Undisclosed |
| 9 July 2009 | MF | (Italy) Daniele Mannini | (Italy) Sampdoria | Joint-ownership bid |

==== Loan out ====
| Date From | Date To | Pos. | Name | Moving To |
|---|---|---|---|---|
| 15 July 2009 | 2010 | FW | (Italy) Camillo Ciano | (Italy) Lecco |
| 15 July 2009 | 2010 | DF | (Italy) Mario D'Urso | (Italy) Lecco |
| 15 July 2009 | 2010 | MF | (Italy) Luca Giannone | (Italy) Lecco |
| 15 July 2009 | 2010 | MF | (Italy) Cosmo Palumbo | (Italy) Lecco |
| 5 August 2009 | 2010 | FW | (Italy) Cristian Bucchi | (Italy) Cesena |
| 7 August 2009 | 2010 | MF | (Italy) Samuele Dalla Bona | (Greece) Iraklis |
| 21 August 2009 | 2010 | FW | (Uruguay) Marcelo Zalayeta | (Italy) Bologna |
| 21 August 2009 | 2010 | MF | (Italy) Luigi Vitale | (Italy) Livorno |
| 20 August 2009 | 2010 | GK | (Argentina) Nicolás Navarro | (Argentina) River Plate |
| 31 August 2009 | 2010 | MF | (Italy) Manuele Blasi | (Italy) Palermo |

== Pre-season and friendlies ==
| 20 July 2009 | St. Pölten (Austria) | 0–2 | (Italy) Napoli | Sankt Pölten |
| 19:00 CEST | | | Lavezzi 65'; Zúñiga 67' | Referee: Hameter |

| 21 July 2009 | Wiener Neustadt (Austria) | 1–4 | (Italy) Napoli | Wiener Neustadt |
| 19:00 CEST | Kurtisi 32' | | Hamšík 18' (pen.); Pazienza 47'; Denis 76', 80' | Referee: Schmidt |

| 30 July 2009 | Sollenau (Austria) | 1–5 | (Italy) Napoli | Wiener Neustadt |
| 18:00 CEST | Knaller 37' | | Lavezzi 7', 31'; Hamšík 35', 41' (pen.); Denis 49' | Referee: Loschober |

| 5 August 2009 | Napoli (Italy) | 0–0 | (Spain) Espanyol | Naples |
| 21:00 CEST | Gargano (yellow card) 22' | | Callejón (yellow card) 22' | Stadium: Stadio San Paolo; Attendance: c. 40,000; Referee: Carmine Russo |

| 8 August 2009 | West Ham United (England) | 0–1 | (Italy) Napoli | London |
| 15:00 GMT | Collins (yellow card) 55' | | Pazienza (yellow card) 42'; Blasi (yellow card) 76' (yellow-red card) 83'; Quagliarella 78' | Stadium: Boleyn Ground; Attendance: 21,364; Referee: Keith Stroud |

| 11 August 2009 | Napoli (Italy) | 1–1 | (Spain) Racing Santander | Naples |
| 21:00 CEST | Bogliacino 56' | | Serrano (yellow card) 31'; Juanjo 72' | Stadium: Stadio San Paolo; Attendance: 15,000; Referee: Carmine Russo |

== Competitions ==
=== Serie A ===
==== League table ====
| Pos | Team | Pld | W | D | L | GF | GA | GD | Pts | Qualification or relegation |
|---|---|---|---|---|---|---|---|---|---|---|
| 4 | Sampdoria | 38 | 19 | 10 | 9 | 49 | 41 | +8 | 67 | Qualification to Champions League play-off round |
| 5 | Palermo | 38 | 18 | 11 | 9 | 59 | 47 | +12 | 65 | Qualification to Europa League play-off round |
| 6 | Napoli | 38 | 15 | 14 | 9 | 50 | 43 | +7 | 59 | Qualification to Europa League play-off round |
| 7 | Juventus | 38 | 16 | 7 | 15 | 55 | 56 | −1 | 55 | Qualification to Europa League third qualifying round |
| 8 | Parma | 38 | 14 | 10 | 14 | 46 | 51 | −5 | 52 | |

Source: Lega Calcio and Yahoo! Sport
Rules for classification: 1) points; 2) head-to-head points; 3) head-to-head goal difference; 4) head-to-head goals scored; 5) goal difference; 6) number of goals scored.

==== Results summary ====
| Overall | | | | | | | | Home | | | | | | Away | | | | | |
| Pld | W | D | L | GF | GA | GD | Pts | W | D | L | GF | GA | GD | W | D | L | GF | GA | GD |
|---|---|---|---|---|---|---|---|---|---|---|---|---|---|---|---|---|---|---|---|
| 38 | 15 | 14 | 9 | 50 | 43 | +7 | 59 | 9 | 8 | 2 | 26 | 16 | +10 | 6 | 6 | 7 | 24 | 27 | −3 |

Last updated: 16 May 2010.
Source: Competitive matches

==== Results by round ====
| Round | 1 | 2 | 3 | 4 | 5 | 6 | 7 | 8 | 9 | 10 | 11 | 12 | 13 | 14 | 15 | 16 | 17 | 18 | 19 | 20 | 21 | 22 | 23 | 24 | 25 | 26 | 27 | 28 | 29 | 30 | 31 | 32 | 33 | 34 | 35 | 36 | 37 | 38 |
|---|---|---|---|---|---|---|---|---|---|---|---|---|---|---|---|---|---|---|---|---|---|---|---|---|---|---|---|---|---|---|---|---|---|---|---|---|---|---|
| Ground | A | H | A | H | A | H | A | H | A | H | A | A | H | A | H | A | H | A | H | H | A | H | A | H | A | H | A | H | A | H | H | A | H | A | H | A | H | A |
| Result | L | W | L | D | L | W | L | W | W | D | W | D | D | D | W | D | W | W | W | D | W | D | L | D | D | D | L | L | D | W | W | D | L | W | D | W | W | L |
| Position | 18 | 9 | 15 | 14 | 17 | 14 | 15 | 14 | 9 | 12 | 6 | 10 | 9 | 11 | 9 | 11 | 6 | 4 | 4 | 4 | 4 | 4 | 4 | 4 | 5 | 6 | 7 | 8 | 7 | 6 | 5 | 6 | 7 | 6 | 7 | 6 | 6 | 6 |

Updated to match(es) played on 16 May 2010. Source: Competitive matches
A = Away; H = Home; W = Win; D = Draw; L = Loss

==== Matches ====
| 23 August 2009 1 | Palermo | 2–1 | Napoli | Palermo |
| 20:45 CEST (UTC+02:00) | Cavani 44'; Miccoli 75' (pen.) | Report | Hamšík 73' | Stadium: Stadio Renzo Barbera; Attendance: 31,236; Referee: Roberto Rosetti |

| 30 August 2009 2 | Napoli | 3–1 | Livorno | Naples |
| 20:45 CEST (UTC+02:00) | Quagliarella 10', 83'; Hamšík 36' | Report | Lucarelli 47' | Stadium: Stadio San Paolo; Attendance: 32,063; Referee: Andrea De Marco |

| 13 September 2009 3 | Genoa | 4–1 | Napoli | Genoa |
| 20:45 CEST (UTC+02:00) | Floccari 45' (pen.); Mesto 55'; Crespo 75'; Kharja 88' (pen.) | Report | Hamšík 41' | Stadium: Stadio Luigi Ferraris; Attendance: 32,234; Referee: Paolo Tagliavento |

| 20 September 2009 4 | Napoli | 0–0 | Udinese | Naples |
| 18:00 CEST (UTC+02:00) | | Report | | Stadium: Stadio San Paolo; Attendance: 30,946; Referee: Massimiliano Saccani |

| 23 September 2009 5 | Internazionale | 3–1 | Napoli | Milan |
| 20:45 CEST (UTC+02:00) | Eto'o 2'; Milito 5'; Lúcio 32' | Report | Lavezzi 37' | Stadium: San Siro; Attendance: 41,695; Referee: Matteo Trefoloni |

| 27 September 2009 6 | Napoli | 2–1 | Siena | Naples |
| 15:00 CEST (UTC+02:00) | Hamšík 49', 64' (pen.) | Report | Maccarone 55' | Stadium: Stadio San Paolo; Attendance: 23,209; Referee: Paolo Valeri |

| 4 October 2009 7 | Roma | 2–1 | Napoli | Rome |
| 15:00 CEST (UTC+02:00) | Totti 37', 63' | Report | Lavezzi 26' | Stadium: Stadio Olimpico; Attendance: 28,119; Referee: Luca Banti |

| 18 October 2009 8 | Napoli | 2–1 | Bologna | Naples |
| 15:00 CEST (UTC+02:00) | Quagliarella 72'; Maggio 90+1' | Report | Adaílton 15' | Stadium: Stadio San Paolo; Attendance: 26,407; Referee: Andrea De Marco |

| 25 October 2009 9 | Fiorentina | 0–1 | Napoli | Florence |
| 15:00 CET (UTC+01:00) | | Report | Maggio 88' | Stadium: Stadio Artemio Franchi; Attendance: 26,864; Referee: Emidio Morganti |

| 28 October 2009 10 | Napoli | 2–2 | Milan | Naples |
| 20:45 CET (UTC+01:00) | Cigarini 90'; Denis 90+3' | Report | Inzaghi 3'; Pato 6' | Stadium: Stadio San Paolo; Attendance: 55,709; Referee: Nicola Rizzoli |

| 31 October 2009 11 | Juventus | 2–3 | Napoli | Turin |
| 18:00 CET (UTC+01:00) | Trezeguet 34'; Giovinco 54' | Report | Hamšík 58', 83'; Dátolo 64' | Stadium: Stadio Olimpico di Torino; Attendance: 22,899; Referee: Antonio Damato |

| 8 November 2009 12 | Catania | 0–0 | Napoli | Catania |
| 18:00 CET (UTC+01:00) | | Report | | Stadium: Stadio Angelo Massimino; Attendance: 14,106; Referee: Roberto Rosetti |

| 22 November 2009 13 | Napoli | 0–0 | Lazio | Naples |
| 15:00 CET (UTC+01:00) | | | | Stadium: Stadio San Paolo; Attendance: 46,524; Referee: Massimiliano Saccani |

| 29 November 2009 14 | Parma | 1–1 | Napoli | Parma |
| 15:00 CET (UTC+01:00) | Amoruso 86' (pen.) | | Denis 33' | Stadium: Stadio Ennio Tardini; Attendance: 19,737; Referee: Matteo Trefoloni |

| 6 December 2009 15 | Napoli | 3–2 | Bari | Naples |
| 15:00 CET (UTC+01:00) | Quagliarella 55', 88'; Maggio 72' | | Barreto 49'; Ranocchia 63' | Stadium: Stadio San Paolo; Attendance: 29,547; Referee: Andrea Romeo |

| 13 December 2009 16 | Cagliari | 3–3 | Napoli | Cagliari |
| 18:00 CET (UTC+01:00) | Larrivey 75'; Matri 80'; Jeda 90' | | Lavezzi 21'; Pazienza 65'; Bogliacino 90+6' | Stadium: Stadio Sant'Elia; Attendance: c. 18,000; Referee: Nicola Pierpaoli |

| 20 December 2009 17 | Napoli | 2–0 | Chievo | Naples |
| 15:00 CET (UTC+01:00) | Hamšík 7'; Quagliarella 87' | | | Stadium: Stadio San Paolo; Attendance: 31,973; Referee: Mauro Bergonzi |

| 6 January 2010 18 | Atalanta | 0–2 | Napoli | Bergamo |
| 15:00 CET (UTC+01:00) | | | Quagliarella 7'; Pazienza 58' | Stadium: Stadio Atleti Azzurri d'Italia; Attendance: 11,061; Referee: Roberto Rosetti |

| 10 January 2010 19 | Napoli | 1–0 | Sampdoria | Naples |
| 15:00 CET (UTC+01:00) | Denis 71' | | | Stadium: Stadio San Paolo; Attendance: 40,962; Referee: Nicola Rizzoli |

| 17 January 2010 20 | Napoli | 0–0 | Palermo | Naples |
| 20:45 CET (UTC+01:00) | | | | Stadium: Stadio San Paolo; Attendance: 49,451; Referee: Daniele Orsato |

| 24 January 2010 21 | Livorno | 0–2 | Napoli | Livorno |
| 15:00 CET (UTC+01:00) | | | Maggio 45+1'; Cigarini 90+1' | Stadium: Stadio Armando Picchi; Attendance: 9,883; Referee: Paolo Mazzoleni |

| 30 January 2010 22 | Napoli | 0–0 | Genoa | Naples |
| 20:45 CET (UTC+01:00) | | | | Stadium: Stadio San Paolo; Attendance: 47,612; Referee: Emidio Morganti |

| 7 February 2010 23 | Udinese | 3–1 | Napoli | Udine |
| 15:00 CET (UTC+01:00) | Di Natale 7', 90+1', 90+3' | | Maggio 21' | Stadium: Stadio Friuli; Attendance: 20,084; Referee: Antonio Damato |

| 14 February 2010 24 | Napoli | 0–0 | Internazionale | Naples |
| 20:45 CET (UTC+01:00) | | | | Stadium: Stadio San Paolo; Attendance: 56,311; Referee: Roberto Rosetti |

| 21 February 2010 25 | Siena | 0–0 | Napoli | Siena |
| 15:00 CET (UTC+01:00) | | | | Stadium: Stadio Artemio Franchi - Montepaschi Arena; Attendance: 10,865; Referee: Antonio Giannoccaro |

| 28 February 2010 26 | Napoli | 2–2 | Roma | Naples |
| 15:00 CET (UTC+01:00) | Denis 75'; Hamšík 90' | | Baptista 59' (pen.); Vučinić 65' | Stadium: Stadio San Paolo; Attendance: 50,832; Referee: Nicola Rizzoli |

| 7 March 2010 27 | Bologna | 2–1 | Napoli | Bologna |
| 15:00 CET (UTC+01:00) | Zalayeta 7'; Adaílton 12' | | Rinaudo 14' | Stadium: Stadio Renato Dall'Ara; Attendance: 21,052; Referee: Andrea Romeo |

| 13 March 2010 28 | Napoli | 1–3 | Fiorentina | Naples |
| 20:45 CET (UTC+01:00) | Lavezzi 47' | | Gilardino 60', 87'; Jovetić 90+5' | Stadium: Stadio San Paolo; Attendance: 31,986; Referee: Luca Banti |

| 21 March 2010 29 | Milan | 1–1 | Napoli | Milan |
| 15:00 CET (UTC+01:00) | Inzaghi 26' | | Campagnaro 13' | Stadium: San Siro; Attendance: 51,044; Referee: Mauro Bergonzi |

| 25 March 2010 30 | Napoli | 3–1 | Juventus | Naples |
| 20:45 CET (UTC+01:00) | Hamšík 51'; Quagliarella 72'; Lavezzi 87' | | Chiellini 7' | Stadium: Stadio San Paolo; Attendance: 52,249; Referee: Rizzoli |

| 28 March 2010 31 | Napoli | 1–0 | Catania | Naples |
| 15:00 CEST (UTC+02:00) | Cannavaro 51' | | | Stadium: Stadio San Paolo; Attendance: 31,642; Referee: Paolo Valeri |

| 3 April 2010 32 | Lazio | 1–1 | Napoli | Rome |
| 15:00 CEST (UTC+02:00) | Floccari 4' | | Hamšík 38' | Stadium: Stadio Olimpico; Attendance: 31,820; Referee: Daniele Orsato |

| 10 April 2010 33 | Napoli | 2–3 | Parma | Naples |
| 18:00 CEST (UTC+02:00) | Quagliarella 3'; Hamšík 78' | | Antonelli 63'; A. Lucarelli 68'; Jiménez 87' | Stadium: Stadio San Paolo; Attendance: 36,527; Referee: Andrea Romeo |

| 18 April 2010 34 | Bari | 1–2 | Napoli | Bari |
| 15:00 CEST (UTC+02:00) | Almirón 75' | | Lavezzi 28, 57' | Stadium: Stadio San Nicola; Attendance: 19,507; Referee: Mauro Bergonzi |

| 25 April 2010 35 | Napoli | 0–0 | Cagliari | Naples |
| 15:00 CEST (UTC+02:00) | | | | Stadium: Stadio San Paolo; Attendance: 41,450; Referee: Paolo Mazzoleni |

| 2 May 2010 36 | Chievo | 1–2 | Napoli | Verona |
| 15:00 CEST (UTC+02:00) | Granoche 75' | | Denis 45+1'; Lavezzi 86' | Stadium: Stadio Marcantonio Bentegodi; Attendance: 11,049; Referee: Andrea De Marco |

| 9 May 2010 37 | Napoli | 2–0 | Atalanta | Naples |
| 15:00 CEST (UTC+02:00) | Quagliarella 43', 83' | | | Stadium: Stadio San Paolo; Attendance: 43,111; Referee: Daniele Orsato |

| 16 May 2010 38 | Sampdoria | 1–0 | Napoli | Genoa |
| 15:00 CEST (UTC+02:00) | Pazzini 51' | | | Stadium: Stadio Luigi Ferraris; Attendance: 30,883; Referee: Nicola Rizzoli |

==== Top scorers ====
- (Slovakia) Marek Hamšík – 12
- (Italy) Fabio Quagliarella – 11
- (Argentina) Ezequiel Lavezzi – 8
- (Argentina) Germán Denis – 5
- (Italy) Christian Maggio – 4

=== Coppa Italia ===
| 16 August 2009 Third elim. round | Napoli | 3–0 | Salernitana | Naples |
| 20:30 CEST | Maggio 29'; Blasi (yellow card) 33'; Lavezzi 43'; Hoffer 84' | Report | Pestrin (yellow card) 36' | Stadium: Stadio San Paolo; Attendance: 20,391; Referee: Andrea Gervasoni |

| 26 November 2009 Fourth elim. round | Napoli | 1–0 | Cittadella | Naples |
| 20:30 CET | Bogliacino 27' | | | Stadium: Stadio San Paolo; Attendance: 30,000; Referee: Domenico Celi |

| 13 January 2010 Round of 16 | Juventus | 3–0 | Napoli | Turin |
| 20:45 CET | Diego 24'; Del Piero 77', 83' (pen.) | | | Stadium: Stadio Olimpico di Torino; Attendance: 18,000; Referee: Andrea Romeo |

== Starting 11 ==
| No. | Pos. | Nat. | Name | MS | Notes |
|---|---|---|---|---|---|
| 26 | GK | (Italy) | De Sanctis | 39 | |
| 14 | CB | (Argentina) | Campagnaro | 30 | |
| 28 | CB | (Italy) | Cannavaro | 33 | |
| 2 | CB | (Italy) | Grava | 23 | |
| 11 | RWB | (Italy) | Maggio | 34 | |
| 5 | CM | (Italy) | Pazienza | 27 | |
| 23 | CM | (Uruguay) | Gargano | 37 | |
| 6 | LWB | (Italy) | Aronica | 25 | |
| 17 | AM | (Slovakia) | Hamšík | 38 | |
| 7 | ST | (Argentina) | Lavezzi | 28 | |
| 27 | CF | (Italy) | Quagliarella | 33 | |

Last updated: 16 May 2010
Source: Squad statistics and Start formations
Only competitive matches.
Using the most used start formation.
Ordered by position on pitch (from back right to front left).
