= Leandro Rinaudo =

Italian footballer (born 1983)

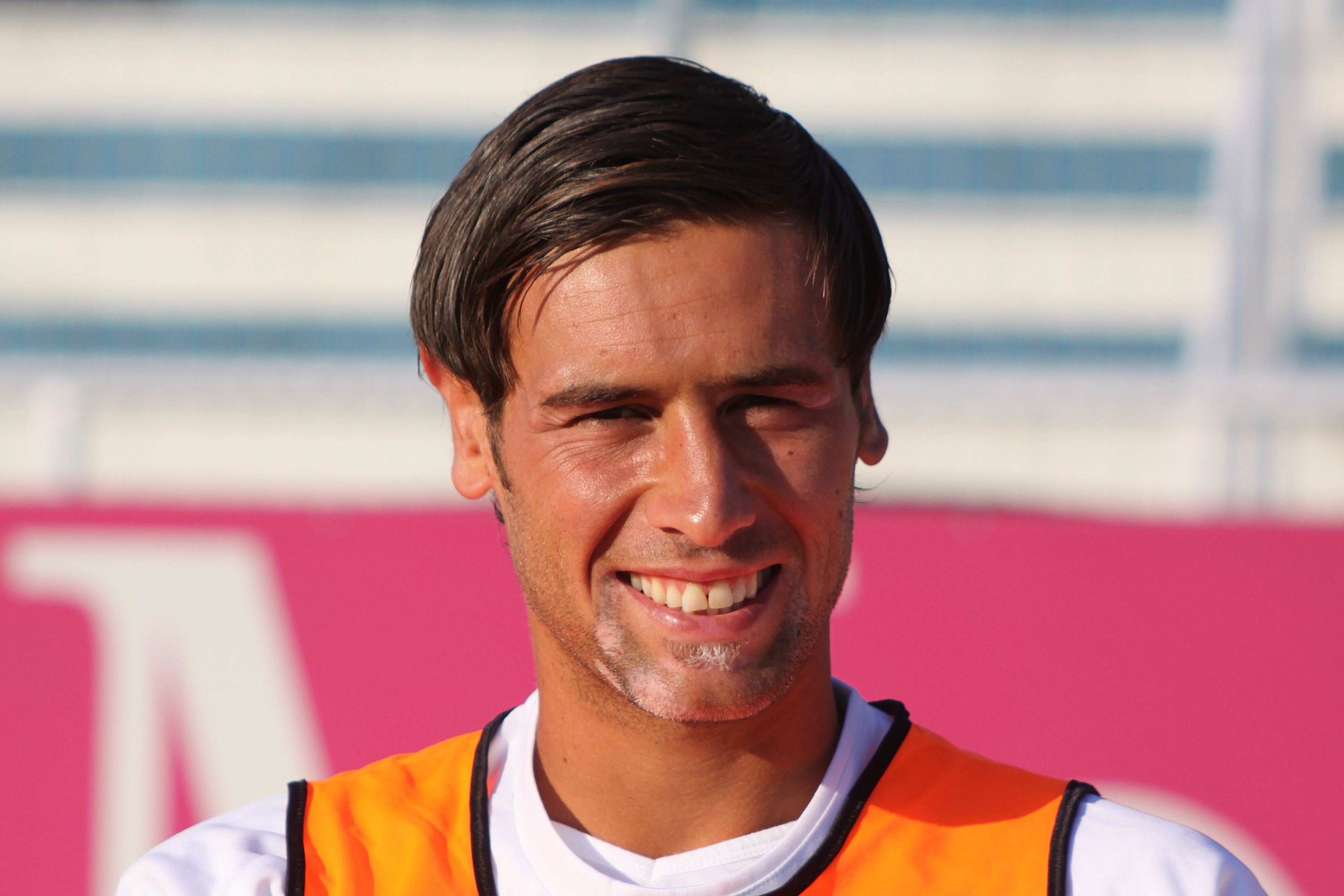

Personal information
- Full name: Leandro Rinaudo
- Date of birth: 9 May 1983 (age 43)
- Place of birth: Palermo, Italy
- Height: 1.91 m (6 ft 3 in)
- Position: Centre back

Youth career
- Palermo

Senior career*
Years	Team	Apps	(Gls)
2002–2008	Palermo	31	(2)
2002–2003	→ Varese (loan)	7	(0)
2003–2004	→ Salernitana (loan)	23	(0)
2004–2005	→ Cesena (loan)	36	(1)
2006–2007	→ Siena (loan)	27	(1)
2008–2013	Napoli	37	(1)
2010–2011	→ Juventus (loan)	1	(0)
2012	→ Novara (loan)	5	(0)
2013–2014	Livorno	21	(1)
2014–2015	Virtus Entella	8	(0)
2015	→ Bari (loan)	11	(0)
2015–2016	Vicenza	4	(0)

International career
2005	Italy U21 B	1	(0)
- * Club domestic league appearances and goals as of 12 February 2015

Leandro Rinaudo (born 9 May 1983) is an Italian former footballer who played as a defender, and a current sports director.

== Early years ==
He comes from the Kalsa neighbourhood of Palermo.

== Club career ==
=== Palermo ===
A youth product of Palermo, Rinaudo was loaned to Serie C1 club Varese in the first year of Maurizio Zamparini's era. The loan was pre-matured in January 2003. However, he failed to enter the first team as Zamparini bought a couple of players from his former club Venezia.

On 30 August 2003, Rinaudo was loaned to Serie B club Salernitana, also playing for the Salernitana youth team in the Coppa Italia Primavera as an overage player.

After Palermo won promotion to Serie A in 2004 as Serie B champion, Rinaudo was excluded from the club's Serie A plan and was loaned to another Serie B club Cesena, where he started to play as one of the regular starters.

Rinaudo returned to Palermo on 1 July 2005. That season, he served as a backup for Christian Terlizzi, Giuseppe Biava, Cristian Zaccardo (right back or centre back) and Andrea Barzagli and therefore only made seven starts in the league, in addition to three starts in the 2005–06 UEFA Cup.

In the 2006–07 Serie A season, near the end of summer transfer window, Rinaudo left for fellow Serie A club Siena along with Paul Codrea. Rinaudo partnered with Daniele Portanova as centre-back, and the team improved in goal conceded, which made Rinaudo earn a third return to Palermo. He made 21 starts in Serie A that season, in which he mainly competed with Biava for the central back position to partner with Barzagli and Zaccardo, usually as right back and Mattia Cassani sometimes as a right winger or left back.

=== Napoli ===
On 4 June 2008, Rinaudo was sold to fellow Serie A club Napoli for €5.5 million, signing a five-year contract. He was not a regular in his first season at Napoli, however, mainly serving as a backup behind Fabiano Santacroce, Paolo Cannavaro and Matteo Contini

In 2009–10, Rinaudo made just 13 starts in Serie A. As Napoli preferred 3–5–2 formation, Salvatore Aronica, Paolo Cannavaro, Gianluca Grava, Hugo Campagnaro and Matteo Contini were usually starters, relegating Rinaudo to the backup centre back role.

Rinaudo did not receive a call-up for Napoli's first official match of the 2010–11 season, against Elfsborg in the UEFA Europea League. The coach used Cannavaro, Aronica, Campagnaro and Grava in the first three matches and demoted Rinaudo to sixth-choice centre back behind Santacroce (who typically played as unused substitute).

=== Juventus ===
As a result of not being called up to the opening game for Napoli in Serie A, Rinaudo opted for and completed a loan move to Juventus on 31 August for a fee of €600,000, with an option to make the transfer permanent for €5 million, thus re-joining former Napoli teammate Fabio Quagliarella, Palermo teammate Amauri and former Palermo coach Luigi Delneri. Napoli also signed centre-back Emílson Cribari on the same day. Rinaudo would be the backup centre back along with Nicola Legrottaglie to cover first choice defenders Giorgio Chiellini and Leonardo Bonucci. Rinaudo also set to join Bari but never completed.

He made his club debut on 26 September 2010, but unusually as a right back; the head coach rested right back Marco Motta and moved Zdeněk Grygera to left back to replace the injured Paolo De Ceglie. That match, Juve defeated Cagliari 4–2. Before the start of the next match, however, a group stage match in the Europa League against Manchester City, Rinaudo was injured and had an operation on the Lumbosacral joint.

=== Novara ===
On 1 July 2011, Rinaudo returned to Napoli, though he was excluded from 2011–12 UEFA Champions League 25-men senior squad. He still earned a reported €850,000. On 11 January 2012, he was loaned to Serie A strugglers Novara, who sat 18th in the league table at the time.

=== Livorno ===
Rinaudo made several appearances for Livorno. Infamously, he made a nasty, from-behind tackle on Giuseppe Rossi that damaged Rossi's knee and kept him out of football for months. Rinaudo's tackle was so poor that he drew international condemnation.

=== Serie B ===
In the summer of 2014, Rinaudo was signed by Virtus Entella. In January 2015, he was signed by Bari. On 20 September 2015, he was signed by Vicenza. On 20 January 2016, however, he was released.

== International career ==
Rinaudo never received any call-up from Italy at youth level, although during the 2004–05 season, he received several call-ups from Italy under-21 Serie B representative team. He was capped once at international level, in the team's only game of the team that season against Bosnia and Herzegovina; he replaced Marco Pomante in the second half. The Italy under-21 Serie B side won the match 3–2.

== After retiring ==
After he retired in 2016, Rinaudo was hired as a scout and the right hand of the sporting director at Vicenza. In October 2017, he changed position and was hired by the club as the new technical director.

In June 2018, he was hired by U.S. Cremonese as their sporting director. He was fired on 28 February 2019.

On 3 August 2019, he returned to his native Palermo, joining the newly refounded club (now in Serie D) as the head of the youth system area.

On 28 July 2022, following the resignations of head coach Silvio Baldini and director of football Renzo Castagnini a few weeks after City Football Group's takeover of Palermo was completed, Rinaudo was promoted to sporting director on an interim basis. On 20 October 2022, Rinaudo was permanently appointed sporting director. On 5 June 2024, after nearly two seasons in charge as sporting director, Palermo confirmed Rinaudo's departure from the club.
