= Fabiano Santacroce =

Italian footballer (born 1986)

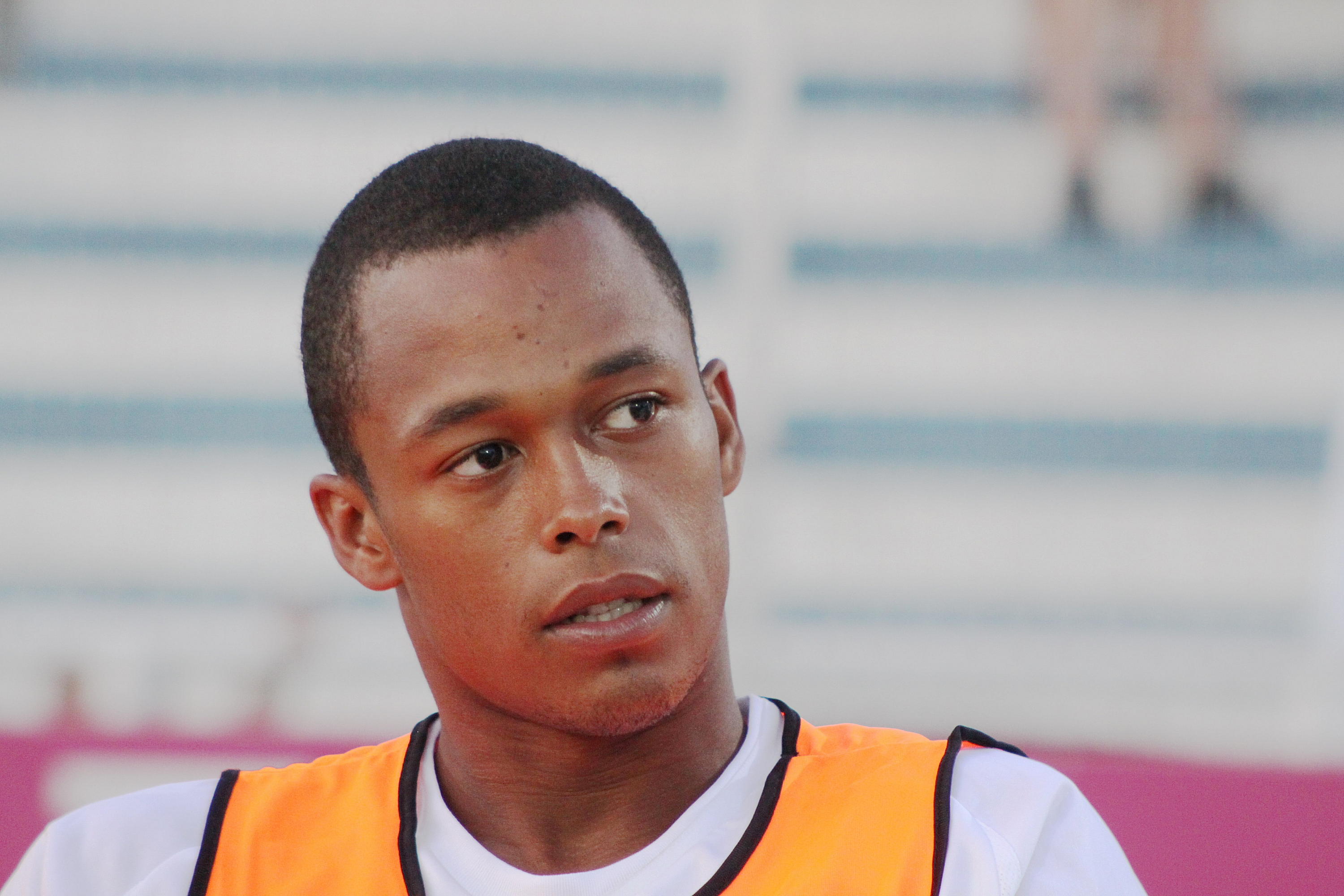
- Santacroce with Napoli in 2009

Personal information
- Full name: Whellington Fabiano Santacroce
- Date of birth: 24 August 1986 (age 40)
- Place of birth: Camaçari, Brazil
- Height: 1.81 m (5 ft 11 in)
- Position: Defender

Youth career
- 2000–2004: Como

Senior career*
Years	Team	Apps	(Gls)
2004–2005	Como	13	(0)
2005–2008	Brescia	43	(3)
2008–2011	Napoli	55	(0)
2011–2015	Parma	35	(0)
2013–2014	→ Padova (loan)	20	(0)
2015–2016	Ternana	2	(0)
2017	Juve Stabia	10	(0)
2018–2019	Cuneo	30	(0)
2019–2020	Virtus Verona	7	(0)
2022	Weese Ca8	2	(0)

International career
2007–2009	Italy U21	6	(0)
- * Club domestic league appearances and goals

Whellington Fabiano Santacroce (born 24 August 1986) is an Italian former professional footballer who played as a defender in the centre or on the left. He was born in Brazil to an Italian father and an Afro-Brazilian mother, then spent his childhood in the Lombard town of Casatenovo, in Northern Italy. At the international level, he has represented the Italy national under-21 football team. He is cousin of fellow footballer Alessandro Santos, who played for Japan-

== Club career ==
=== Como ===
Santacroce was a youth product of Calcio Como SpA. He finished as the losing side in the round 16 of 2004 Primavera Reserve League. He was in the starting lineup alongside future Serie A players Marco Parolo, Giuseppe Greco and Daniele Padelli.

Parolo and Santacroce were promoted to the Como first team in 2004, as the club had faced financial difficulties as well as relegation from Serie B in 2004. Santacroce remained with the club in the whole 2004–05 Serie C1 despite being declared bankrupt on 22 December 2004. Santacroce was in the starting XI in Como's relegation "play-out", which the playoffs matches Como losing to Novara in 1–2 aggregate. Como folded at the end of the season, as a takeover bid was denied.

=== Brescia ===
Santacroce moved to Brescia as a free agent and played for their Primavera team before making his first team debut for the rondinelle in a Serie B game on 23 April 2006, against Cesena. He played at Brescia from 2005 to 2007, also ensuring a place in the Italian U-21 team due to his impressive performances with the Lombardian side.

=== Napoli ===
During the January 2008 transfer window, Serie A club Napoli completed the signing of Santacroce in a permanent move, for €5.5 million, becoming the third Brescia player to join the azzurri that year, the other two being Marek Hamšík and Daniele Mannini. He quickly established himself in Napoli's regular lineup, forming a valid defence duo with team captain Paolo Cannavaro, and playing very well throughout the remainder of the season. Santacroce has been described by a number of people in Italy, including Napoli chairman Aurelio De Laurentiis, as the "new Alessandro Nesta" That half season he started 13 times as well as 27 times in 2008–09 Serie A. However, after the arrival of Hugo Campagnaro, Walter Mazzarri started to fix his 3-man defence to Salvatore Aronica, Campagnaro and Cannavaro.

=== Parma ===
At the start of 2011–12 Serie A, Napoli sent Manuele Blasi and Santacroce to Parma as part of the compensation of signing Blerim Džemaili (€9 million). Santacroce went on loan for €100,000. He was largely used as a back-up central defender and made 12 league appearances, which was enough to secure him a move to Parma in a co-ownership deal for €900,000 in 4-year contract in July 2012. Santacroce wore no.13 shirt that season, changing from no.33.

Following the 2012–13 Serie A season, the remaining half of Santacroce's ownership was purchased from Napoli by Parma for free. The club now owns him outright. On 6 August 2013, Santacroce left for Padova in a temporary deal. Santacroce was given no.3 shirt of the first team.

=== Ternana and Juve Stabia ===
On 1 February 2016, the last day of the transfer market goes in Serie B with Ternana, signing a contract until June with the option for the following season. Collect only two appearances and 30 June is released from the Umbrian club. The 19 January 2017 is made official its acquisition by Juve Stabia.

=== Virtus Verona ===
On 17 August 2019, he signed a one-year contract with Virtus Verona. He retired from football in early 2021, and pursued a career as a sports agent. Before retiring completely, Santacroce had a short spell at Italien amateur club Weese Ca8.

== International career ==
Santacroce has been a member of the Italy U-21 national team from 2007 to 2009.

In 2008–09, Santacroce was confirmed as a Napoli regular, and his performances were quickly noted by new Italy head coach Marcello Lippi, who on 5 October 2008 called him to join the azzurri squad for the FIFA World Cup 2010 qualification matches against Bulgaria and Montenegro. Santacroce dedicated his senior call-up to his former Como youth team coach Stefano Borgonovo, who was battling amyotrophic lateral sclerosis at the time, succumbing to the disease in 2013.

"We live in intolerant times. If the presence of Santacroce with the national team sends a message against racism, I am happy about that."

— The Italy manager, Marcello Lippi, on calling up Santacroce.

However, he was an unused substitute during these matches, and never played a senior international match.

== Career statistics ==
=== Club ===
Statistics accurate up until 16 May 2012

Season	Team	League			Domestic cup			European			Total	
Season	Team	Division	Games	Goals	Competition	Games	Goals	Competition	Games	Goals	Games	Goals
2004–05	Como	C1	13	0	CIC	0	0	–	–	–	13	0
Total Como			13	0		0	0		–	–	13	0
2005–06	Brescia	B	2	0	CI	0	0	–	–	–	2	0
2006–07	Brescia	B	25	2	CI	1	0	–	–	–	26	2
2007–08	Brescia	B	16	1	CI	1	0	–	–	–	17	1
Total Brescia			43	3		2	0		–	–	45	3
2007–08	Napoli	A	13	0	CI	0	0	–	–	–	13	0
2008–09	Napoli	A	27	0	CI	1	0	CU	2	0	30	0
2009–10	Napoli	A	4	0	CI	1	0	–	–	–	5	0
2010–11	Napoli	A	11	0	CI	1	0	EL	2	0	14	0
Total Napoli			55	0		3	0		4	0	62	0
2011–12	Parma	A	12	0	CI	1	0	–	–	–	13	0
Total			123	3		6	0		4	0	133	3
