= Rinaudo =

Rinaudo is a surname. Notable people with the surname include:

- Fabián Rinaudo (born 1987), Argentinian football player
- Leandro Rinaudo (born 1983), Italian football player
