= Andrea Gentile =

Italian footballer (born 1980)

Personal information
- Full name: Andrea Gentile
- Date of birth: 9 February 1980 (age 46)
- Place of birth: Aosta, Italy
- Height: 1.70 m (5 ft 7 in)
- Position: Midfielder

Youth career
- Juventus

Senior career*
Years	Team	Apps	(Gls)
1998–2003	Juventus	0	(0)
1998–1999	→ Valle d'Aosta (loan)	26	(0)
2000–2002	→ Brescello (loan)	59	(3)
2002–2003	→ Triestina (loan)	25	(1)
2003–2007	Messina	31	(2)
2004–2005	→ Arezzo (loan)	35	(4)
2005–2006	→ Torino (loan)	7	(0)
2006–2007	→ Crotone (loan)	19	(0)
2007	→ Monza (loan)	11	(0)
2007–2009	Padova	37	(1)
2010	Olbia	7	(2)
2010–2011	Canavese	18	(0)
2011–2012	Cuneo	28	(2)
2013–2014	Vallée d'Aoste	17	(0)

International career
1995	Italy U16	2	(0)
1995–1996	Italy U17	3	(0)
- * Club domestic league appearances and goals

Andrea Gentile (born 9 February 1980) is an Italian retired footballer who played as a midfielder.

== Career ==
Born in Aosta Valley, Gentile started his career at Juventus. After spent 2002–03 season loaned back to Aosta for Serie D side Valle d'Aosta, along with Luigi Lavecchia were loaned to Brescello, where Gentile played for 2 seasons. He then loaned to Serie B side Triestina.

In 2003, along with Lavecchia and Salvatore Aronica were sold to Messina for €1.5 million (€500,000 each) in co-ownership deal. Gentile won promotion to Serie A in June 2004, but went back to Serie B for Arezzo on loan, along with Lavecchia.

In 2005–06 season, as first he went to Torino on loan, after a limited chance, he went to Crotone on loan. In June 2006, the co-ownership contract of Juve and Messina expired, Gentile now fully owned by Messina. Gentile remained at Crotone for the first half of the season, played 4 starts in 11 appearances. In mid-season, he left for Serie C1 side Monza on loan (exchanged with Vinicio Espinal).

In July 2007, he left for Padova in co-ownership deal, signed a 2+1 year contract. In June 2008 Padova acquire the remain rights form Messina few weeks before the bankrupt of Messina. He then played 15 league matches for Padova before released on 30 June 2009. Padova won promotion to Serie B in June 2009

In March 2010, Olbia of Lega Pro Seconda Divisione announced the signing of Gentile.
