= Walter Gargano =

Uruguayan footballer (born 1984)

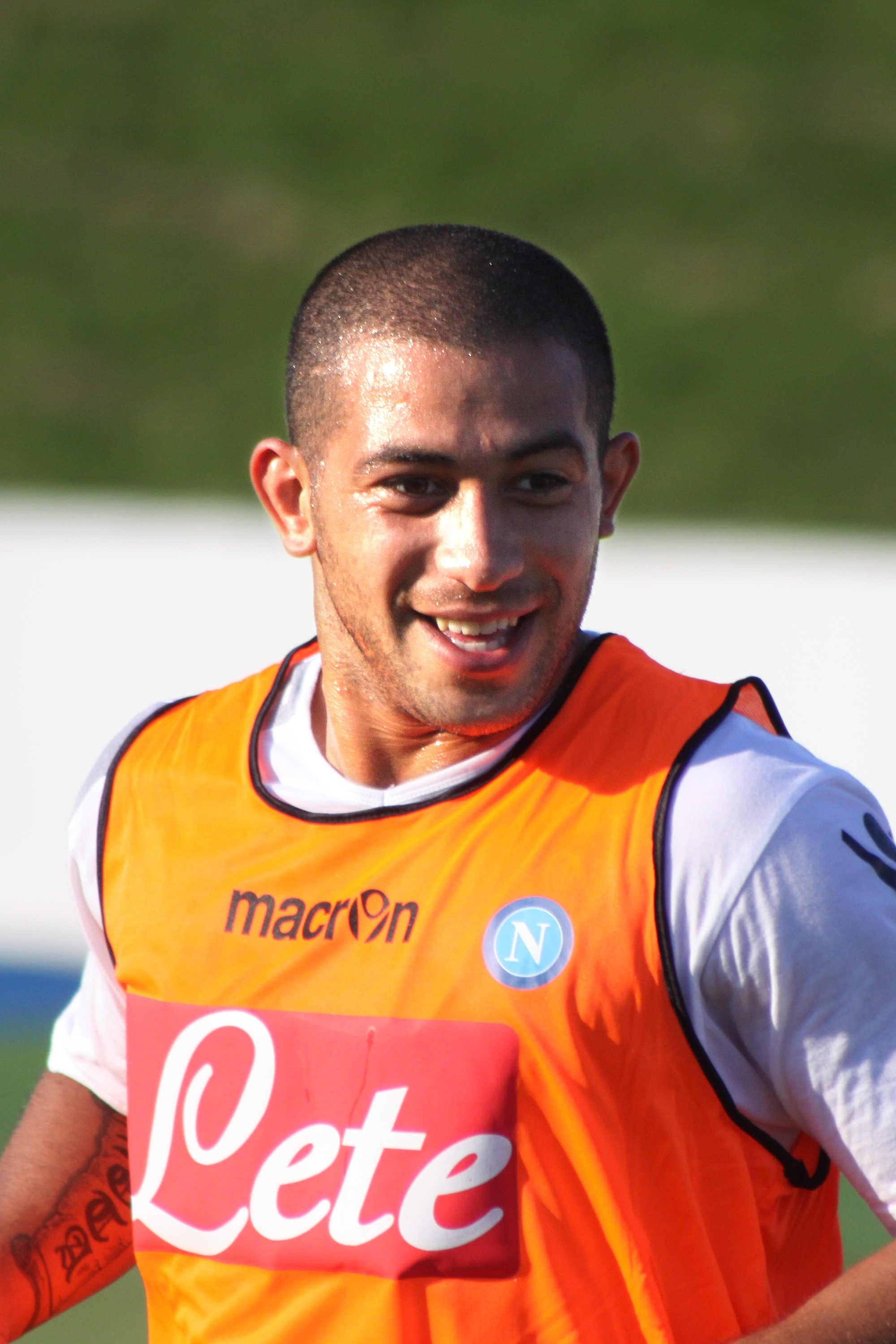
- Gargano training for Napoli in 2009

Personal information
- Full name: Walter Alejandro Gargano Guevara
- Date of birth: 23 July 1984 (age 42)
- Place of birth: Paysandú, Uruguay
- Height: 1.67 m (5 ft 6 in)
- Position: Defensive midfielder

Youth career
- 2001–2003: Danubio

Senior career*
Years	Team	Apps	(Gls)
2003–2007	Danubio	102	(3)
2007–2015	Napoli	189	(4)
2012–2013	→ Internazionale (loan)	28	(0)
2013–2014	→ Parma (loan)	22	(1)
2015–2017	Monterrey	64	(0)
2017–2023	Peñarol	106	(2)
2023–2024	River Plate	13	(0)
2024	Durazno	0	(0)
Total		524	(10)

International career
2006–2014	Uruguay	64	(1)
Medal record
Representing Uruguay
Copa América
Winner	2011 Argentina
- * Club domestic league appearances and goals

Walter Alejandro Gargano Guevara (Spanish pronunciation: [ˈwalteɾ ɣaɾˈɣano]; born 23 July 1984) is a Uruguayan former footballer who played as a defensive midfielder.

== Club career ==
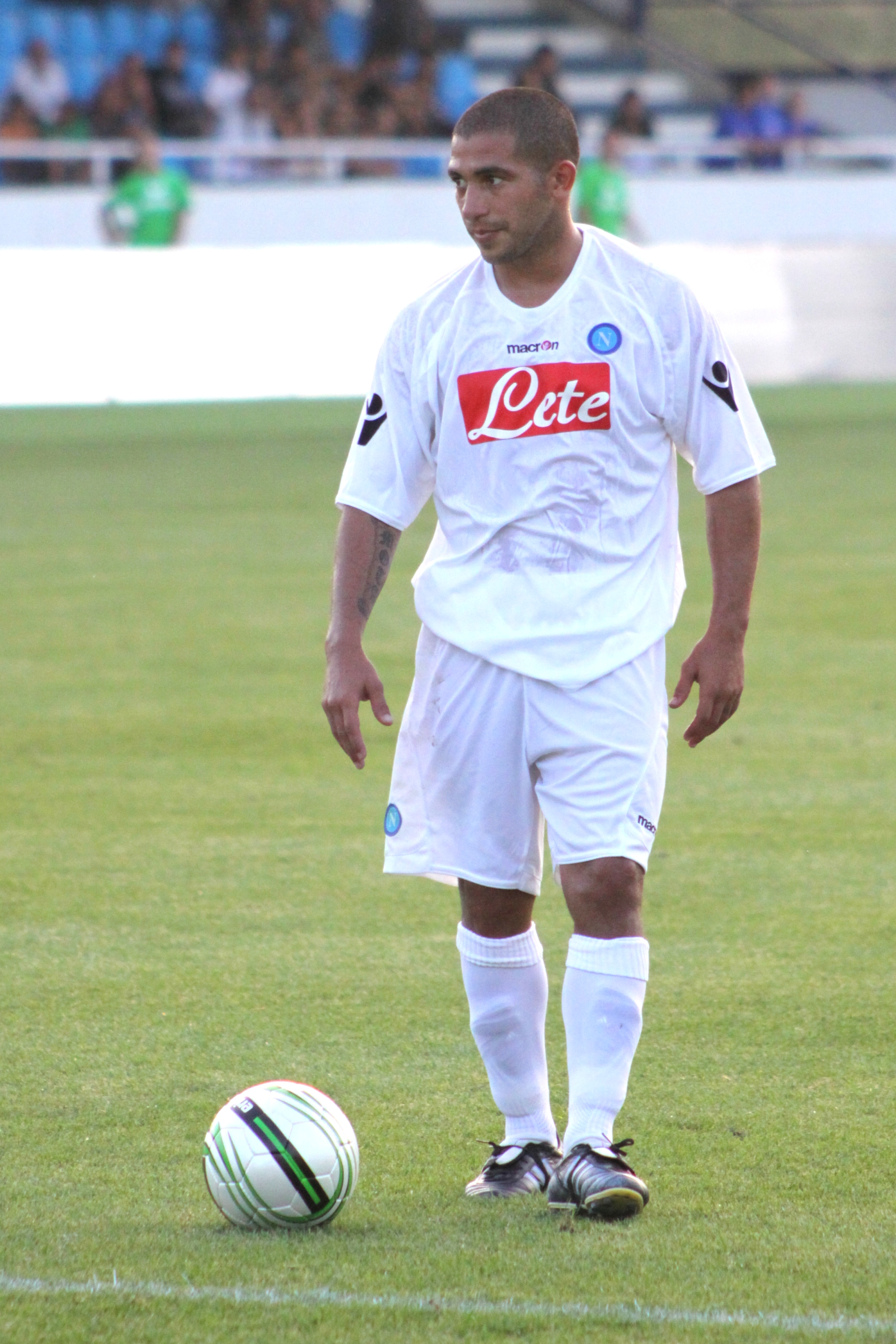
Gargano with Napoli during a friendly

=== Youth career ===
Gargano started playing football aged three and joined the now defunct youth club Centella in Paysandú. In the youth club, he was in the midfield position. While in the youth, Gargano played against his future club Danubio, where he was soon discovered by the club and joined them.

=== Danubio ===
Gargano started his professional career with Danubio in 2003 and made his league debut aged 19. He won two national titles with Danubio (2004 (which was his first season winning it) and 2006–07). He made 102 appearances and scored three times and was a regular player in the first team.

=== Napoli ===
On 30 June 2007, Gargano agreed a transfer from Uruguayan club Danubio to newly promoted Napoli for a fee of £2m signing a five-year contract. He made his first appearance for the club in a 4–0 win over Cesena and made his Serie A debut on 26 August 2007 against Cagliari. On 20 October 2007, he scored his first goal in a 4–4 draw against Roma and netted the following week, in a 3–1 win over Juventus. In his first season, he made 34 appearances scoring twice. Also during his first season, Gargano received two sending offs, a second bookable offence in a 5–2 loss against Milan on 13 January 2008 and three months on, a straight red card in a 2–1 win over Parma on 20 April 2008.

The following season, Gargano made his UEFA Cup debut in a 3–2 win over Benfica in the first round. However, in the second leg, Benfica would win 2–0, eliminating Napoli. On 29 September 2008, he provided a winning goal for Germán Denis, scoring the only goal in the game against Bologna. In the mid second season, he suffered a fractured foot during training in March 2009 and was sidelined for two months. He recovered in time to feature in the last two games of the Serie A season, against Catania and Chievo.

In January 2010, Gargano renewed his contract with Napoli until 2015. He made his 100th appearance for the club in a 3–1 loss against Fiorentina on 13 March 2010. The following season, he played all six matches in Napoli's Europa League campaign as the club advanced to the knockout stage, only to be eliminated by Villarreal. He continued to establish himself in the first team, playing as a defensive midfielder.

The following season, Gargano was linked with a move while the arrival of Gökhan Inler from Udinese threatened his first-team place. Eventually, he remained at the club. Having placed third in the league the previous, the club entered the Champions League. He made his debut in the Champions League in a 1–1 draw against Manchester City and played all seven matches, with Napoli progressing through the knockout stage before being eliminated by Chelsea. Gargano was involved in the squad assisting a goal for Edinson Cavani, who scored a hat-trick in a 3–1 win over defending champions Milan. On 21 December 2011, he scored his first goal in a 6–1 win against Genoa, ending his four-year goal drought. Three months later, on 9 March 2012, he scored his second of the season in a 6–3 win over Cagliari. At the end of the season, Napoli won the Coppa Italia final in a 2–0 win over Juventus in which Gargano did not feature after picking up his second yellow card in the semi-final match against Siena.

=== Internazionale ===
Gargano signed for Internazionale on 23 August 2012 on loan for €1.25m with an option to make the move permanent for €8.25m. Three days after his move, he made his debut in the opening game of the season in a 3–0 win over Pescara.

=== Monterrey ===
In the summer of 2015, Gargano signed for Mexican club Monterrey, after his eight-year long spell in Italy. He played at the inauguration of the BBVA Bancomer stadium, the new home stadium for Monterrey.

== International career ==
Gargano represented his nation at the 2007 Copa América, where they finished in fourth place. He was included in the Uruguayan squad for the 2010 World Cup, where he came on as a substitute on several occasions, as Uruguay finished fourth in the tournament. In 2011, he was part of the Copa América winning Uruguay squad, and scored in the penalty shoot-out victory against Argentina in the quarter-finals. He also took part at the 2013 FIFA Confederations Cup, where Uruguay finished fourth; in the bronze medal match against Italy, following a 2–2 draw after extra-time, he missed the decisive penalty in his nation's 3–2 shoot-out defeat. He later took part at the 2014 FIFA World Cup.

== Personal life ==
Gargano is married to former Napoli teammate Marek Hamšík's sister, Michaela. Together, the couple have three children: Matias, born on 7 May 2010, Thiago, born on 7 April 2012, and Leo, born on 27 November 2017.

== Career statistics ==
=== Club ===
Appearances and goals by club, season and competition
Club	Season	League			National cup		Continental		Other		Total	
Club	Season	Division	Apps	Goals	Apps	Goals	Apps	Goals	Apps	Goals	Apps	Goals
Napoli	2007–08	Serie A	34	2	0	0	–		–		34	2
Napoli	2008–09	Serie A	26	0	2	0	3 (Note: Appearances in UEFA Cup)	0	–		31	0
Napoli	2009–10	Serie A	36	0	3	0	–		–		39	0
Napoli	2010–11	Serie A	36	0	1	0	9 (Note: Appearances in UEFA Europa League)	0	–		46	0
Napoli	2011–12	Serie A	33	2	3	0	7 (Note: Appearances in UEFA Champions League)	0	–		43	2
Napoli	2012–13	Serie A	–		–		–		1 (Note: Appearance in Supercoppa Italiana)	0	1	0
Napoli	2014–15	Serie A	24	0	3	0	8 (Note: Two appearances in UEFA Champions League, six appearances in UEFA Europa League)	0	1	0	36	0
Napoli	Total		189	4	12	0	27	0	2	0	230	4
Inter Milan (loan)	2012–13	Serie A	28	0	1	0	7	0	–		36	0
Parma (loan)	2013–14	Serie A	22	1	1	0	–		–		23	1
Monterrey	2015–16	Liga MX	37	0	6	0	–		–		43	0
Monterrey	2016–17	Liga MX	27	0	6	0	3 (Note: Appearances in CONCACAF Champions League)	0	–		36	0
Monterrey	Total		64	0	12	0	3	0	–		79	0
Peñarol	2017	Uruguayan Primera División	16	0	–		–		–		16	0
Peñarol	2018	Uruguayan Primera División	10	1	–		1 (Note: Appearance(s) in Copa Libertadores)	0	1 (Note: Appearance in Supercopa Uruguaya)	0	12	1
Peñarol	2019	Uruguayan Primera División	24	0	–		8 (Note: Four appearances in Copa Libertadores, four appearances and one goal in Copa Sudamericana)	1	1	0	33	1
Peñarol	2020	Uruguayan Primera División	23	0	–		5 (Note: Four appearances in Copa Libertadores, one appearance in Copa Sudamericana)	0	–		28	0
Peñarol	2021	Uruguayan Primera División	21	1	–		13 (Note: Appearances in Copa Sudamericana)	1	–		34	2
Peñarol	2022	Uruguayan Primera División	12	0	–		6	0	1	0	19	0
Peñarol	Total		106	2	–		33	2	3	0	142	4
Career total			409	7	26	0	70	2	5	0	510	9

=== International ===
Appearances and goals by national team and year
National team	Year	Apps	Goals
Uruguay	2006	4	0
Uruguay	2007	7	0
Uruguay	2008	9	0
Uruguay	2009	6	0
Uruguay	2010	9	0
Uruguay	2011	6	1
Uruguay	2012	8	0
Uruguay	2013	11	0
Uruguay	2014	4	0
Total		64	1

Scores and results list Uruguay's goal tally first, score column indicates score after each Gargano goal.

List of international goals scored by Passang Tshering
No.	Date	Venue	Opponent	Score	Result	Competition
1	29 May 2011	Rhein-Neckar-Arena, Sinsheim, Germany	Germany	1–2	1–2	Friendly

== Honours ==
Napoli

- Coppa Italia: 2011–12
- Supercoppa Italiana: 2014

Peñarol

- Uruguayan Primera División: 2018, 2021
- Supercopa Uruguaya: 2018, 2022

Uruguay

- Copa América: 2011
