= Michele Pazienza =

Italian footballer (born 1982)

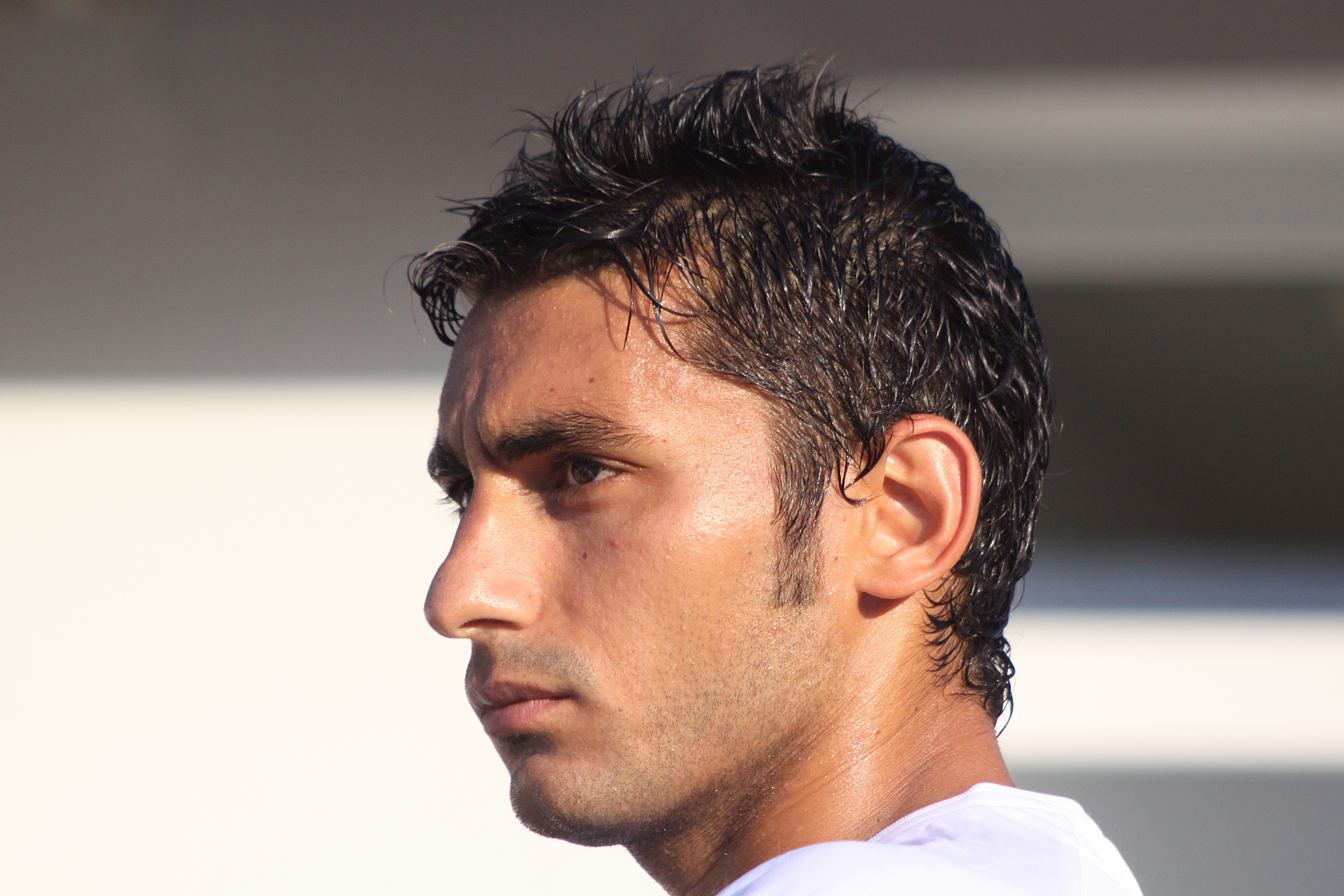

Personal information
- Date of birth: 5 August 1982 (age 44)
- Place of birth: San Severo, Italy
- Height: 1.75 m (5 ft 9 in)
- Position: Defensive midfielder

Youth career
- Foggia

Senior career*
Years	Team	Apps	(Gls)
2000–2003	Foggia	88	(6)
2003–2007	Udinese	52	(0)
2005–2007	→ Fiorentina (loan)	44	(0)
2007–2008	Fiorentina	8	(0)
2008–2011	Napoli	106	(4)
2011–2012	Juventus	8	(0)
2012	→ Udinese (loan)	15	(1)
2012–2015	Bologna	37	(2)
2015–2016	Vicenza	6	(0)
2016	Reggiana	6	(0)
2016–2017	Manfredonia	25	(1)

Managerial career
- 2017–2018: Pisa
- 2018: Siracusa
- 2020–2023: Audace Cerignola
- 2023–2024: Avellino
- 2024–2025: Benevento
- 2025: Torres
- 2026–: Foggia
- * Club domestic league appearances and goals

Michele Pazienza (Italian pronunciation: [miˈkɛːle patˈtsjɛntsa]; born 5 August 1982) is an Italian football coach and a former player who played as a defensive midfielder.

== Career ==
=== Foggia ===
Pazienza was born in San Severo in the province of Foggia, and grew up in Foggia Calcio's youth team. He debuted with the first team in Serie C2 in 2000. Pazienza played with Foggia until 2003, scoring six goals in 88 appearances and helping the team reach the promotion play-offs in 2002 and promotion to Serie C1 in 2003.

=== Udinese ===
The following season Pazienza then transferred to Udinese, also making his Serie A debut with the club. He made 52 appearances in his two seasons with the club.

=== Fiorentina ===
Pazienza left on loan to Fiorentina for the 2005–06 and 2006–07 seasons for a loan fee of €350,000 annually and was then purchased outright by the club in June 2007 for an additional fee of €3.15 million (a misc. fee that cost La Viola an additional €160,000 was later shifted to other company); he made 52 league appearances for la Viola in total.

=== Napoli ===
During the 2008 winter transfer window, Pazienza was purchased by Napoli in a 3 1/2-year contract for a transfer fee of €4.25 million. In total, he made 106 appearances for the club, scoring four goals.

=== Juventus ===
On 9 June 2011, Pazienza signed a three-year contract with Juventus on a free transfer. After only making eight appearances under Antonio Conte, he moved on loan from Juventus back to Udinese on 31 January 2012, where he played the remainder of the season, making 15 appearances and scoring a goal, for a total of 23 Serie A appearances that season.

=== Bologna ===
On 30 August 2012, Pazienza was purchased by Bologna for €300,000 on a three-year contract, worth €1,081,615 in the first season and €1,261,569 in the second and the third season respectively in gross. The transfer also cost Bologna an additional €366,000 as other fees. Pazienza was ranked joint-4th as the highest earner from the Bologna squad in the 2012–13 season.

Pazienza made 37 league appearances for Bologna in the first two seasons. However, he did not play any game in his last year of contract in 2014–15 season, when the club was relegated to Serie B.

=== Vicenza & Reggiana ===
On 14 July 2015, Pazienza signed for Serie B club Vicenza Calcio on a free transfer; he was awarded the number 4 shirt.

On 4 February 2016, he was transferred to Lega Pro side Reggiana on a five-month contract.

In the summer of 2016, along with other free agents, Pazienza obtained the license to be a youth team coach (UEFA B License).

=== Manfredonia ===
In August, Pazienza started to train with Serie D club Manfredonia. He signed a contract on 24 September.

== Style of play ==
Although Pazienza primarily excelled as a ball winner and at breaking down opposition attacks, he was also capable of aiding his team offensively due to his stamina, work rate, dynamism, finesse, and ability to make attacking runs into the area; he was also able to aid his team creatively and was an effective assist provider.

== Coaching career ==
=== Pisa ===
Pazienza was promoted to the head coach position at Serie C club Pisa from their Under-19 squad on 19 October 2017 following the firing of Carmine Gautieri. He was dismissed from Pisa on 26 March 2018.

=== Siracusa ===
On 5 November 2018, he was appointed manager of Siracusa. He was fired by Siracusa on 15 December 2018.

=== Audace Cerignola ===
On 15 July 2020, Pazienza was named the new head coach of Serie D club Audace Cerignola. Despite failing on promotion, he was confirmed also for the 2021–22 Serie D campaign, during which he led Audace Cerignola to be crowned Group H champions, thus ensuring themselves a Serie C place for the first time in over 80 years in the club's history.

After three seasons in charge of Audace Cerignola, he left the club by the end of the 2022–23 season.

=== Avellino ===
On 13 September 2023, Pazienza returned to management as the new head coach of Serie C club Avellino. He was dismissed on 22 September 2024, together with the rest of the technical area staff, including sporting director Giorgio Perinetti, following a negative start of the season.

=== Benevento ===
On 5 February 2025, Pazienza was announced as the new head coach of Serie C promotion hopefuls Benevento. He was sacked on 11 March 2025, having only managed the club for five matches.

=== Torres ===
On 18 June 2025, Pazienza was unveiled as the new head coach of Serie C club Torres. He was dismissed on 2 November 2025, after a negative start in the season that left Torres in the relegation playoff zone.

== Managerial statistics ==
As of match played 12 March 2025

Managerial record by team and tenure
Team	Nat	From	To	Record							
Team	Nat	From	To	G	W	D	L	GF	GA	GD	Win %
Pisa	(Italy)	19 October 2017	26 March 2018	22	9	9	4	27	19	+8	40.91
Siracusa	(Italy)	5 November 2018	15 December 2018	7	1	3	3	4	7	−3	14.29
Audace Cerignola	(Italy)	15 July 2020	21 June 2023	123	65	33	25	219	122	+97	52.85
Avellino	(Italy)	13 September 2023	22 September 2024	52	26	13	13	84	47	+37	50.00
Benevento	(Italy)	5 February 2025	12 March 2025	5	0	4	1	3	5	−2	0.00
Total				209	101	61	47	337	200	+137	48.33

== Honours ==
=== Managerial ===
Audace Cerignola

- Serie D: 2021–22 (Group H)
