= Manuele Blasi =

Italian footballer (born 1980)

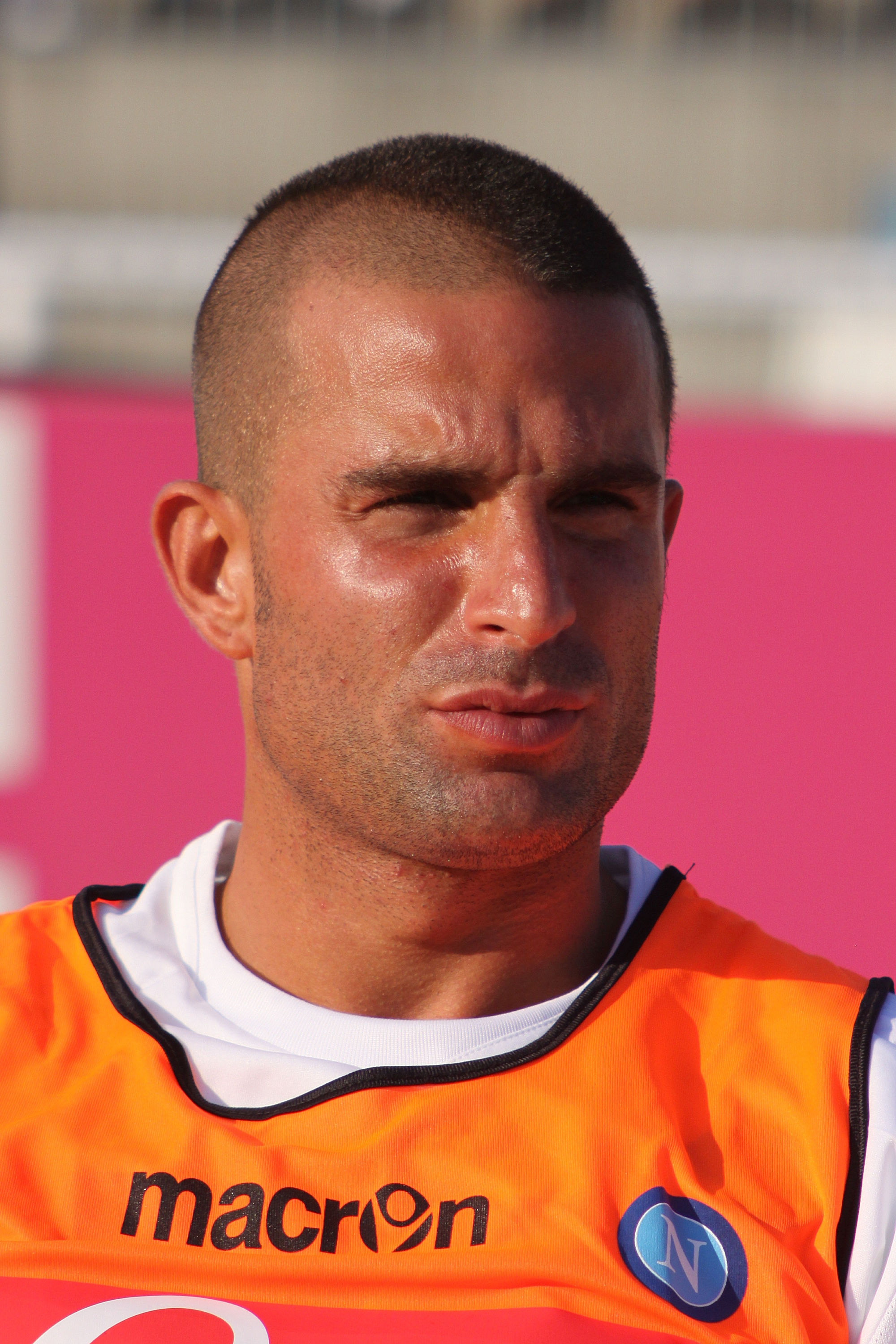
- Blasi with Napoli in 2009

Personal information
- Date of birth: 17 August 1980 (age 46)
- Place of birth: Civitavecchia, Italy
- Height: 1.78 m (5 ft 10 in)
- Position: Midfielder

Team information
- Current team: FC Paradiso (sporting director)

Youth career
- 1996–1998: Roma

Senior career*
Years	Team	Apps	(Gls)
1998–2000	Roma	5	(0)
1998–1999	→ Lecce (loan)	12	(0)
2000–2002	Perugia	46	(0)
2002–2007	Juventus	40	(0)
2002–2003	→ Perugia (loan)	30	(0)
2003–2004	→ Parma (loan)	12	(0)
2006–2007	→ Fiorentina (loan)	31	(1)
2007–2011	Napoli	61	(0)
2009–2010	→ Palermo (loan)	14	(0)
2011–2012	Parma	6	(0)
2012	Lecce	16	(0)
2012–2013	Pescara	12	(0)
2013–2015	Varese	45	(0)
2015–2016	Chennaiyin FC	19	(0)
2016	→ Ischia (loan)	4	(0)
2017	CPC 2005		

International career
1996	Italy U15	10	(1)
1996–1997	Italy U16	10	(0)
1998–1999	Italy U18	10	(0)
2000	Italy U20	4	(0)
2000–2002	Italy U21	6	(0)
2004–2005	Italy	8	(0)

Managerial career
- 2017–2018: CPC 2005
- 2019–2020: Hamrun Spartans
- 2020–2021: Ayia Napa
- 2021: Apolonia Fier
- 2023: Enosis Neon Paralimni
- 2024–2025: FC Paradiso
- * Club domestic league appearances and goals

Manuele Blasi (Italian pronunciation: [manuˈɛːle ˈblaːzi]; born 17 August 1980) is an Italian former professional footballer who played a midfielder, currently working as the sporting director of Swiss club FC Paradiso.

== Club career ==
Primarily a central midfielder, Blasi made his Serie A debut for AS Roma in a match against Piacenza on 22 January 2000. He also played for Lecce at Serie B before returning to Roma. In mid-2000, he was signed by Perugia at (first in a co-ownership deal for a peppercorn of 1 million Italian lire; €516). At Perugia, he played 46 Serie A matches. In June 2001, he was signed permanently for 18 billion lire (€9.296 million), however, in terms of the signing of Giuseppe Cattivera also for 18 billion lire.

In July 2002, he was signed by Juventus for about €17.7 million, and loaned back to Perugia in the first season.

In the second season he joined Parma. He was suspended due to testing positive for nandrolone until March.

=== Juventus ===
Blasi returned to Juventus FC in 2004, under Fabio Capello, his coach at Roma; he received his first Italy call-up in August. In his first season with Juventus, he was often partnered with his former Roma teammate Emerson in the centre of the team's midfield, in Capello's 4–4–2 formation, fighting off competition from Stephen Appiah and Alessio Tacchinardi for a starting spot, and collecting 27 appearances as Juventus won the league title.

The following season, due to the injuries of Jonathan Zebina and Gianluca Pessotto, he often played as a right-back. Due to the arrival of Patrick Vieira and the emergence of Giorgio Chiellini, however, he often found a lack of first team opportunities both in midfield and defence, although he was awarded a new contract extension, which would keep him with the club until 2009. He made six starts for the club throughout the season, as the team won a second consecutive league title.

While waiting for the outcome of the 2006 Italian football scandal sentences, which ultimately saw Juventus relegated to Serie B and stripped of their previous two league titles due to their involvement in Calciopoli, Blasi joined Fiorentina on a loan with an option to buy, under Cesare Prandelli, who had previously also been his coach at Parma.

=== Napoli ===
Along with his former Juventus teammate Marcelo Zalayeta, Blasi was sold to newly promoted Serie A team Napoli for €1.4 million and €2.45 million respectively in co-ownership deal in the summer of 2007. He signed a five-year contract with the club. In June 2008, Napoli bought the remaining half of the player's registration rights from Juventus for €2.6 million.

On 31 August 2009, Blasi was loaned to Palermo after he had played the opening match of the season against Salernitana in the Coppa Italia on 16 August. On 20 May 2010, he joined AC Milan on loan exclusively for a three-game friendly tournament in the United States.

=== Lecce ===
On 27 January 2012, Blasi signed with Serie A side Lecce during the January transfer window.

=== Pescara ===
On 7 August 2012, Blasi joined the newly promoted Serie A side Delfino Pescara 1936 on a one-year deal.

=== Varese ===
Blasi joined Varese in 2013. He spent two seasons at the club and was released in 2015.

=== Chennaiyin ===
Blasi joined Indian club Chennaiyin FC in 2015 after the expiry of his contract at Varese. He was retained in 2016, after a short spell at Ischia Isolaverde.

== International career ==
At youth level, Blasi played for the Italy U-15 team, the Italy U-16 team in 1997 UEFA European Under-16 Championship qualifying; the Italy U-18 team at the 1999 UEFA European Under-18 Championship, where they lost out to the Portugal U-18 side in the final; and the Italy U-20 team at the 2000 Toulon Tournament. He also played for the Italy U-21 side at the 2002 UEFA European Under-21 Championship, as a starter, due to the injury of Enzo Maresca; he partnered Matteo Brighi, Andrea Pirlo and Marco Marchionni in midfield, as they reached the semi-finals.

Manuele Blasi has also played for the Italy senior national team, for which he debuted on 18 August 2004 in a 2–0 friendly away loss against Iceland, at the age of 24, which was also manager Marcello Lippi's first match in charge of the national side. In total, he made eight appearances for Italy between 2004 and 2005.

== Style of play ==
A box-to-box midfielder, with high stamina. Blasi is a versatile player, who is capable of playing as a right-sided or central midfielder, or as a defensive midfielder in the centre of a three-man midfield, where his primary function is to break down opposition plays and distribute the ball to his teammates. He is known for his leadership and team spirit, although he has also drawn criticism at times from his managers for committing too many fouls and for tending to pick up cards. Primarily a midfielder, throughout his career, he has also played as a right-back on occasion. Due to his technical characteristics and wide range of skills, he has been also deployed as a deep-lying playmaker in midfield, in front of the back-line, courtesy of his good feet, distribution, and ability to switch the play.

== Coaching career ==
On 12 January 2017, it was announced that Blasi had joined Italian amateur club CPC 2005 Civitavecchia. However, in September 2017, he was announced as the club's new manager.

On 23 May 2019, Blasi was named manager of the Maltese club of Hamrun Spartans for his first professional experience as a manager. Despite reaching the quarter-finals in the Maltese FA Trophy, he was sacked by the club on the beginning of February 2020.

Blasi also served as head coach of Swiss team FC Paradiso from October 2024 to March 2025, successively switching to a sporting director position within the same club.

== Career statistics ==
=== Club ===
Appearances and goals by club, season and competition
Club	Season	League			Coppa Italia		Continental		Total	
Club	Season	Division	Apps	Goals	Apps	Goals	Apps	Goals	Apps	Goals
Lecce (loan)	1998–99	Serie B	12	0	6	0	–		18	0
Roma	1999–2000	Serie A	5	0	2	0	0	0	7	0
Perugia	2000–01	Serie A	20	0	1	0	2	0	23	0
Perugia	2001–02	Serie A	26	0	4	0	0	0	30	0
Perugia	Total		46	0	5	0	2	0	53	0
Perugia (loan)	2002–03	Serie A	30	0	5	0	2	0	37	0
Parma (loan)	2003–04	Serie A	12	0	0	0	1	0	13	0
Juventus	2004–05	Serie A	27	0	1	0	8	0	36	0
Juventus	2005–06	Serie A	13	0	3	0	5	0	21	0
Juventus	Total		40	0	4	0	13	0	57	0
Fiorentina (loan)	2006–07	Serie A	31	1	2	0	0	0	33	1
Napoli	2007–08	Serie A	27	0	3	0	0	0	30	0
Napoli	2008–09	Serie A	32	0	0	0	5	0	37	0
Napoli	2009–10	Serie A	0	0	1	0	0	0	1	0
Napoli	2010–11	Serie A	2	0	1	0	2	0	5	0
Napoli	Total		61	0	5	0	7	0	73	0
Palermo (loan)	2009–10	Serie A	14	0	1	0	0	0	15	0
Parma	2011–12	Serie A	6	0	1	0	0	0	7	0
Lecce	2011–12	Serie A	16	0	2	0	–		18	0
Pescara	2012–13	Serie A	12	0	0	0	–		12	0
Varese	2013–14	Serie B	22	0	1	0	–		23	0
Varese	2013–14	Serie B	23	0	3	0	–		26	0
Varese	Total		45	0	4	0	0	0	49	0
Career total			330	1	37	0	25	0	392	1

=== International ===
Appearances and goals by national team and year
National team	Year	Apps	Goals
Italy	2004	4	0
Italy	2005	4	0
Total		8	0

== Honours ==
Chennaiyin FC

- Indian Super League: 2015
