= Salvatore Aronica =

Italian footballer (born 1978)

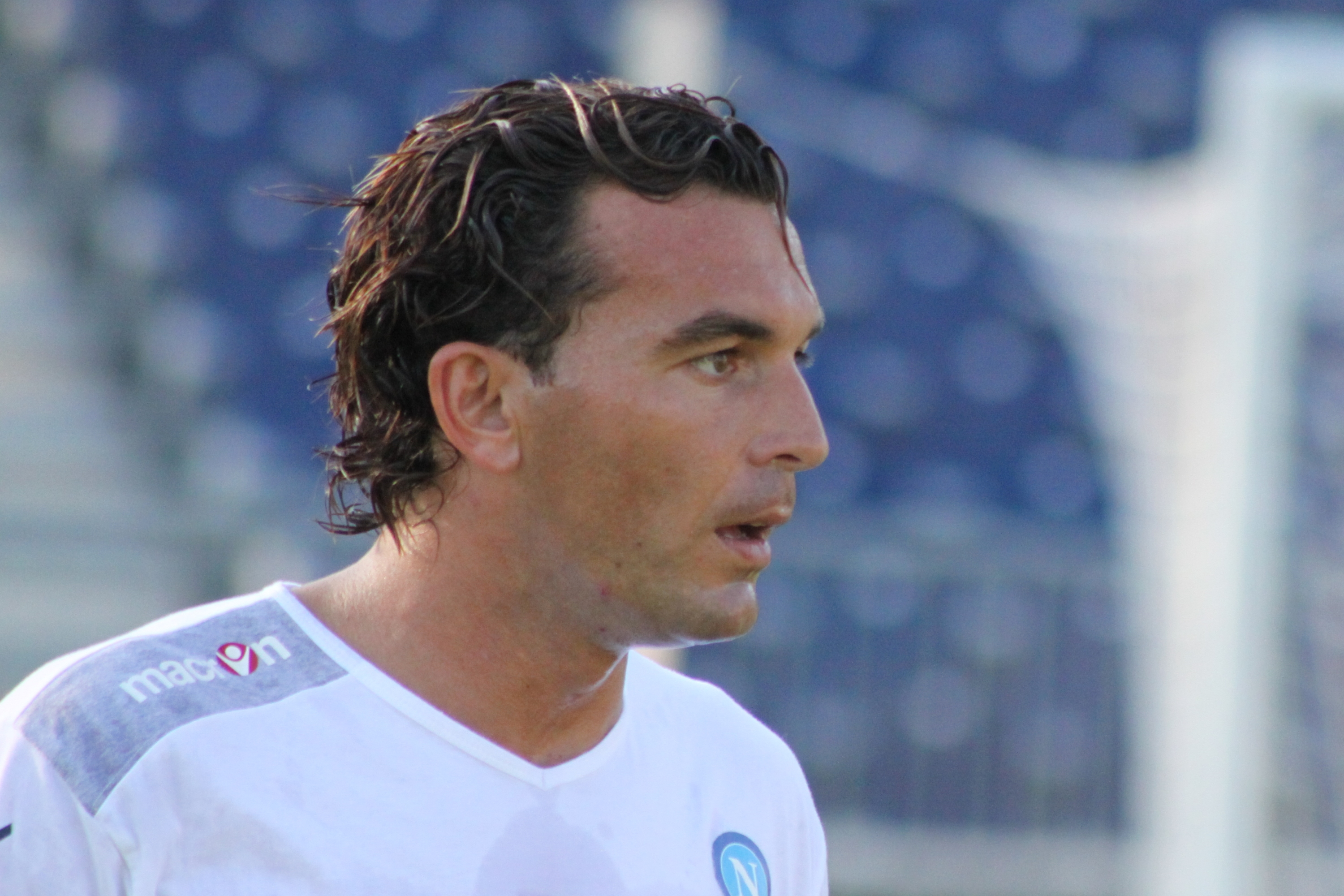
- Aronica with Napoli

Personal information
- Date of birth: 20 January 1978 (age 48)
- Place of birth: Palermo, Italy
- Height: 1.80 m (5 ft 11 in)
- Positions: Centre-back; left-back

Team information
- Current team: Trapani (head coach)

Youth career
- Bagheria

Senior career*
Years	Team	Apps	(Gls)
1994–1996	Bagheria	32	(0)
1996–1998	Juventus	1	(0)
1998–2002	Crotone	107	(1)
2002–2003	Ascoli	31	(0)
2003–2006	Messina	97	(0)
2006–2008	Reggina	71	(0)
2008–2013	Napoli	111	(0)
2013–2014	Palermo	16	(0)
2015	Reggina	13	(0)
2015	Calcio Sicilia		
Total		479	(1)

Managerial career
- 2020–2021: Savoia
- 2022–2023: Don Carlo Misilmeri
- 2024: Trapani
- 2025–: Trapani
- * Club domestic league appearances and goals

Salvatore Aronica (born 20 January 1978) is an Italian football manager and former player who played as a defender, currently in charge of Serie D Group I club Trapani.

== Playing career ==
Aronica spent his early career with Juventus, but he was sent to Crotone on loan. The deal became a co-ownership deal for the 2000–01 and 2001–02 seasons for €91,000. In June 2002, Aronica returned to Juventus for an undisclosed fee but was loaned to Serie B side Ascoli with an option to purchase. However, the next season, he moved to Messina from Juventus, along with Luigi Lavecchia and Andrea Gentile, in another co-ownership deal. Aronica was valued at €1 million at that time, thus Messina purchased half for €500,000. In June 2006, Messina purchased Aronica for an undisclosed fee (approximately €240,000 to €300,000) and acquired Lavecchia and Gentile outright. However, in July 2006, he was sold to Reggina.

He was signed by Napoli on 1 September 2008, for €2,675,000, With the departure of Maurizio Domizzi and Erminio Rullo, Aronica was featured as a left-sided central defender or as a left-sided wingback ahead of Mirko Savini in the team's 3–5–2 formation, sharing the role of the team's left wingback with Luigi Vitale.

In 2010–11 season he started to play with Paolo Cannavaro and Hugo Campagnaro consistently. Although they played well that season, in the following season, the squad's lack of depth made it difficult to face both 2011–12 UEFA Champions League and 2011–12 Serie A, making the club slip from a third-place finish in 2010–11 to fifth place in 2011–12. In May 2012 Aronica renewed his contract (1+1 year).

On 29 December 2012, he moved to Palermo, signing a contract until 2015. His Palermo stay was, however, difficult from the very beginning, as he failed in helping his club to escape relegation and was subsequently excluded from the first team for the whole 2013–14 Serie B season, as well as the early part of 2014–15. He mutually rescinded his contract in December 2014.

On 14 January 2015, he returned to Lega Pro side Reggina. After helping the club avoid relegation, he left the team at the end of the season, and briefly joined Calcio Sicilia, before retiring from professional football in 2015.

== Coaching career ==
After retiring, Aronica obtained his Italy Category 2 Coaching License (UEFA A License), making him eligible to coach youth and Lega Pro teams or as an assistant manager in Serie A and Serie B. In September 2018, it was announced that Aronica would join Trapani as a youth coach. On 15 July 2019, he moved in as Under-17 youth coach for Trapani.

In July 2020 he took over his first coaching role, as manager of Serie D club Savoia. He was sacked on 4 February 2021.

On 19 December 2022, Aronica was unveiled as head coach of Eccellenza Sicily amateurs Don Carlo Misilmeri. He left the club by the end of the season after guiding it to the promotion playoffs.

In July 2024, Aronica signed as the new Under-19 coach of Trapani. On 2 September 2024, following the dismissal of head coach Alfio Torrisi, Aronica was temporarily promoted in charge of the first team. After leading Trapani to a 2–1 away win to Crotone on his debut, Trapani chairman and owner Valerio Antonini announced to have appointed Aronica as the permanent head coach for the season. He was removed from his managerial duties on 11 December 2024, after failing to improve the team's results. On 30 March 2025, he was re-hired as head coach of Trapani following the dismissal of Vincenzo Torrente, becoming the fifth manager of the season of the club.

== Personal life ==
On 23 June 2003, Aronica married Caterina Moltrasio. Together, they have two children, born in 2004 and 2010.

In May 2007, Aronica was made an honorary citizen of Reggio Calabria after helping the local club Reggina avoid relegation during the 2006–07 Serie A season.

== Controversy ==
On 24 March 2009, Aronica, along with Franco Brienza and Vincenzo Montalbano, was included in the list of players who were accused of conspiring with the Mafia to fix some of Palermo's matches in 2003. Aronica was playing for Ascoli at the time but was involved in one of the matches which was under investigation, namely Ascoli–Palermo (1–2), from 24 May 2003. In September 2009, however, the case was archived, as the statute of limitations had expired.

In July 2018, Aronica and former Napoli footballers Pepe Reina and Paolo Cannavaro were subject to a hearing by the Italian Football Federation over links to the Esposito brothers, high-ranking members of the Camorra.
