= Gianluca Grava =

Italian footballer

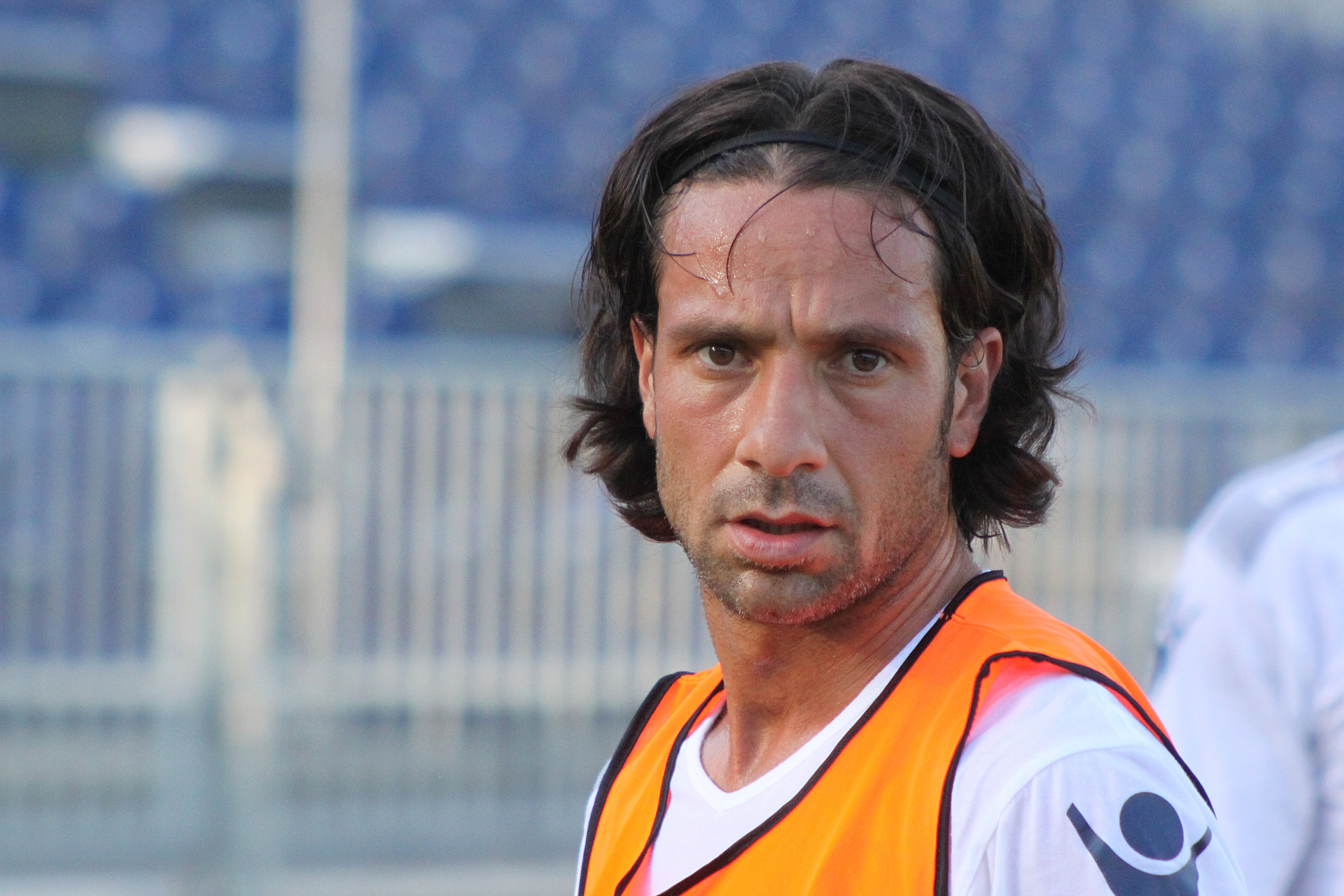

Personal information
- Date of birth: 7 March 1977 (age 48)
- Place of birth: Caserta, Italy
- Height: 1.72 m (5 ft 8 in)
- Position(s): Right back, Centre back

Senior career*
Years	Team	Apps	(Gls)
1993–1997	Casertana	84	(7)
1997–1998	Turris	28	(0)
1998–2004	Ternana	143	(1)
2004–2005	Catanzaro	15	(0)
2005–2013	Napoli	148	(2)
- *Club domestic league appearances and goals

Gianluca Grava (born 7 March 1977) is an Italian retired football defender who currently works as Technical Director of the youth sector for Serie A club Napoli.

== Career ==
He made his Serie A debut at the age of 30 in Napoli's 5–0 victory over Udinese on 2 September 2007; he had previously made over 350 appearances with various clubs in the lower divisions of Italian football.

On 1 July 2011, he extended his contract again.

== Honours ==
Napoli

- Serie C1 : 2005–06
- Coppa Italia: 2011–12
