= Hugo Campagnaro =

Argentine footballer (born 1980)

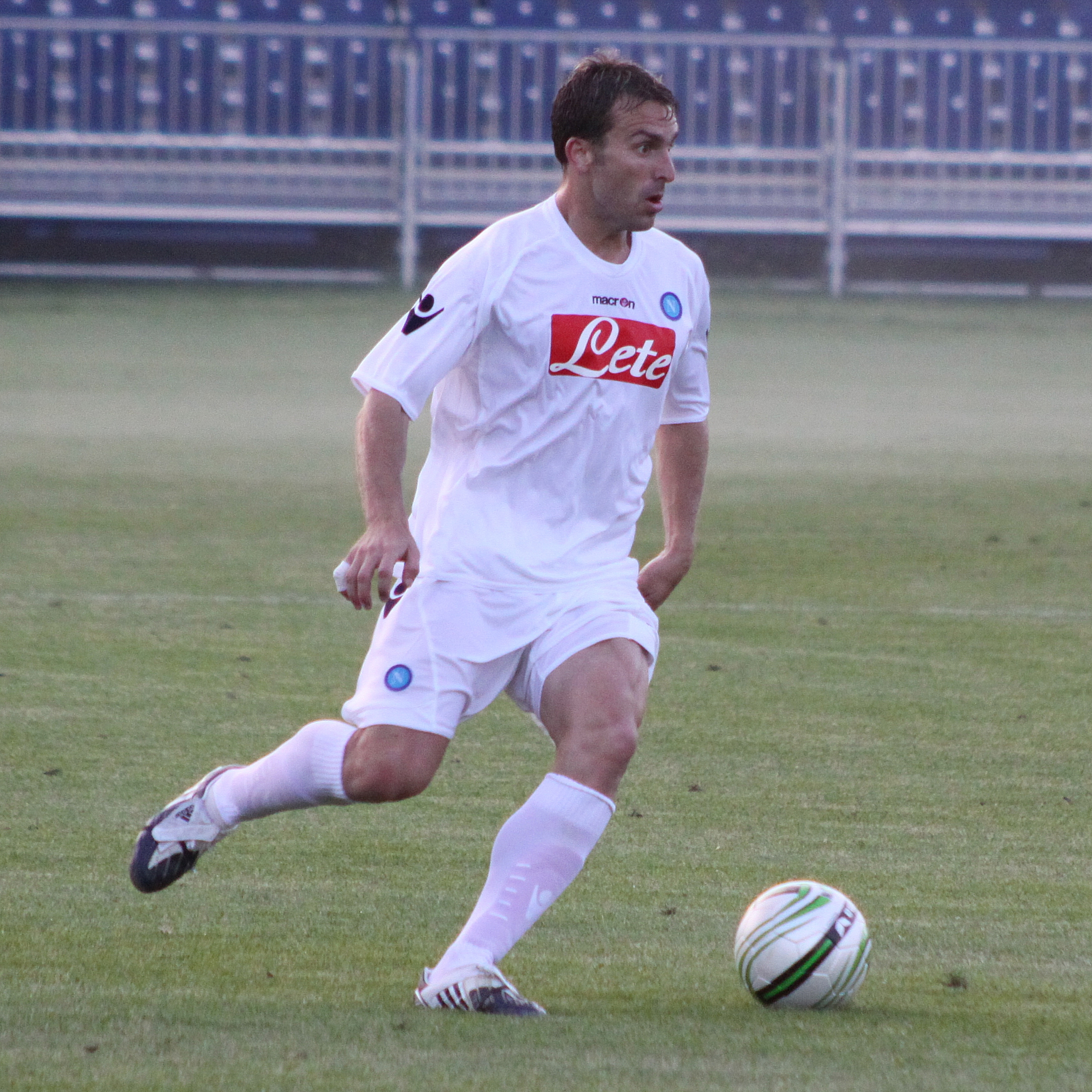
- Campganaro playing for Napoli in 2009

Personal information
- Full name: Hugo Armando Campagnaro
- Date of birth: 27 June 1980 (age 46)
- Place of birth: Córdoba, Argentina
- Height: 1.81 m (5 ft 11 in)
- Position: Centre back

Senior career*
Years	Team	Apps	(Gls)
1998–2002	Deportivo Morón	103	(6)
2002–2007	Piacenza	127	(10)
2007–2009	Sampdoria	38	(1)
2009–2013	Napoli	118	(4)
2013–2015	Inter Milan	31	(0)
2015–2020	Pescara	62	(4)

International career
2012–2014	Argentina	17	(0)
Medal record
Argentina
FIFA World Cup
Runner-up	2014 Brazil	Team
- * Club domestic league appearances and goals

Hugo Armando Campagnaro (Spanish pronunciation: [ˈuɣo]; born 27 June 1980) is an Argentine former professional footballer who played as a centre back.

He started his club career in Argentina with Deportivo Morón, before moving to Europe to play for Italian club Pescara. After five seasons in the Serie A and then Serie B, he joined top flight club Sampdoria. He then spent four seasons at Napoli, where he won the Coppa Italia, and two at Inter Milan. In 2015, he joined Serie B club Pescara, helping them earn a promotion in 2016. He retired at the club in 2020.

He made his debut for Argentina in 2012 at the age of 31. He earned 17 caps for his country, and represented them at the 2014 World Cup, where he won a runners-up medal.

== Club career ==
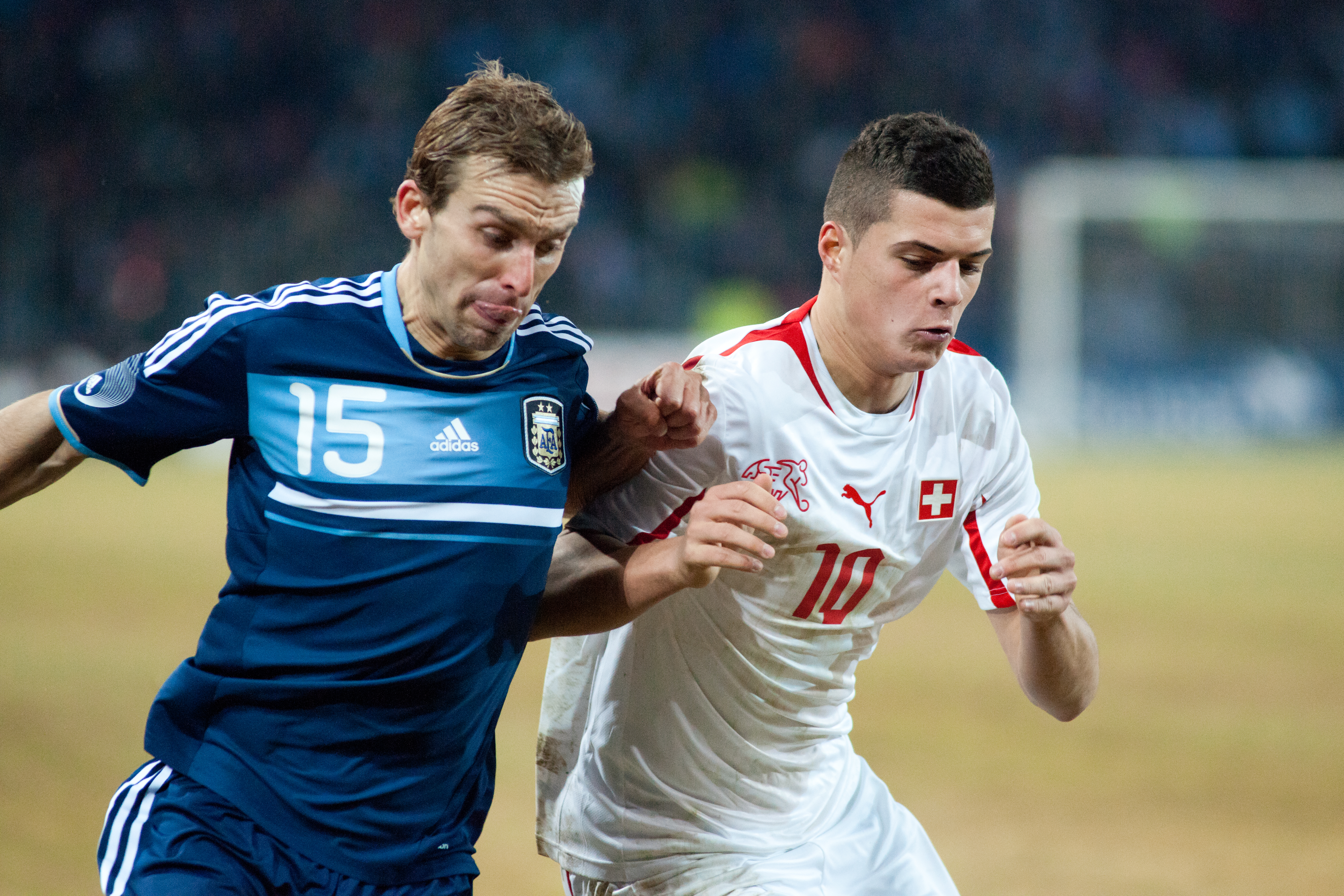
Hugo Campagnaro in his debut for Argentina against Switzerland in 2012

He started his career at Club Deportivo Morón, playing in the Argentine second and third division. In 2002, having not played first division football, he was signed by Piacenza, who were in Serie A at the time.

In the summer of 2007, he was signed by Sampdoria in preparation for their 2007 UEFA Intertoto Cup campaign. Campagnaro was worth €1.55 million at the time.

=== Napoli ===
On 9 July 2009, Campagnaro was sold to Napoli for €7 million. As part of the deal, Daniele Mannini moved to Sampdoria in a joint-ownership bid for €3.5 million; Campagnaro signed a four-year contract.

Campagnaro made his debut with Napoli on 23 August 2009 in week one of the 2009–10 Serie A season against Palermo, playing the entire match in a 2–1 away loss. Later, in March 2010, he scored his first goal for Napoli after an assist by Ezequiel Lavezzi in a 1–1 draw against Milan at the San Siro. He finished his first season with Napoli having played 30 matches, 28 of which were in Serie A, with Napoli finishing 6th place in the league and qualifying for the 2010–11 UEFA Europa League play-off round.

In the 2010–11 season, he was one of Napoli's most important players, helping the team to finish the season in 3rd place and qualifying directly to the group phase of the 2011–12 UEFA Champions League. He played 39 matches in all competitions. He made his European debut with Napoli in the second match of the play-off round against Swedish side Elfsborg, playing the final 17 minutes in a 2–0 win at Borås Arena.

During the 2011–12 season, Campagnaro won his first trophy with Napoli, the Coppa Italia, where he played 90 minutes to help the team to a 2–0 win against Serie A champions Juventus at Stadio Olimpico. On 14 September 2011, for the first time in his career, he made his Champions League debut on Matchday 1 against Manchester City, playing 90 minutes in a 1–1 draw at the Etihad Stadium. Napoli finished Group A in Champions League as runners-up with 11 points, with Bayern Munich topping the group. In the first leg of the round of 16 clash against English side Chelsea (who would go on to win the tournament), Campagnaro played 90 minutes for Napoli in an historic 3–1 win at San Paolo. Napoli lost the second match 4–1 after extra time at Stamford Bridge and were eliminated from the tournament.

In his final season at Napoli, Campagnaro played the entire match of the 2012 Supercoppa Italiana with Napoli losing 4–2 after extra time against Juventus in China's Beijing National Stadium. In the league, he played 28 matches, scoring once in a 1–1 draw against Lazio on 9 February 2013. On 1 July 2013, his contract expired and he left the club.

=== Inter Milan ===
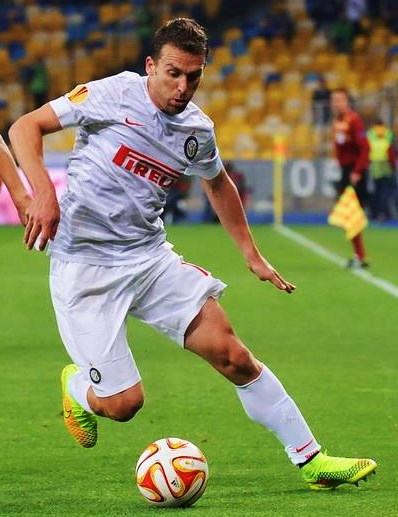
Campagnaro playing for Inter Milan

On 6 July 2013, Campagnaro signed for Inter Milan on a two-year deal. He made his debut with Inter in the third round of the 2013–14 Coppa Italia competition, with Inter beating Cittadella 4–0 to qualify to the next round. He started the match and played 65 minutes alongside Ranocchia and Juan Jesus. He debuted in Serie A on 25 August in week one of the 2013–14 season against Genoa in a 2–0 win at San Siro. He ended first season in the Nerazzurri shirt playing 23 matches in all competitions.

For the 2014–15 season, many rumours circulated regarding a possible departure from Inter, but the player refused to negotiate a cancellation of his contract and did not leave the club. He made his European debut for Inter in the first match of the group stage of the 2014–15 Europa League against Ukrainian side Dnipro Dnipropetrovsk.

== International career ==
He made his debut for Argentina national football team on 29 February 2012 in a friendly match against Switzerland, which Argentina won 3–1.

In June 2014, Campagnaro was named in Argentina's squad for the 2014 FIFA World Cup. He started in Argentina's 2–1 defeat of Bosnia and Herzegovina at the Estádio do Maracanã, playing the first half before being substituted for Fernando Gago. He did not play again for the rest of the tournament, with Argentina finishing runners-up after losing 1–0 in final of Estádio do Maracanã against Germany after extra time.

== Style of play ==
A strong, solid, and aggressive centreback, with good anticipation and reactions, Campagnaro is difficult to beat in one on one situations, and has been given the nickname El Toro (the bull). In addition to his physical attributes, he possesses good technique, vision, and tactical versatility; because of these attributes, he can play in both a 3-man and 4-man defence, and has even been deployed as a right-back, where he is often involved in the build-up of plays, due to his distribution.

== Personal life ==
On 9 June 2011, he was involved in a serious road traffic accident in the province of Córdoba, Argentina, which killed one of the passengers in his SUV and two people in the other car involved in the incident.

== Career statistics ==
=== Clubs ===
As of 31 October 2018

Appearances and goals by club, season and competition
Club	Season	League		Cup		League Cup		Continental		Other^{1}		Total	
Club	Season	Apps	Goals	Apps	Goals	Apps	Goals	Apps	Goals	Apps	Goals	Apps	Goals
Deportivo Morón	1998–99	2	0	0	0	–		–		–		2	0
Deportivo Morón	1999–00	28	0	0	0	–		–		–		28	0
Deportivo Morón	2000–01	31	1	0	0	–		–		–		31	1
Deportivo Morón	2001–02	42	5	0	0	–		–		–		42	5
Deportivo Morón	Total	103	6	0	0	0	0	0	0	0	0	103	6
Piacenza	2002–03	12	2	4	0	–		–		–		16	2
Piacenza	2003–04	22	2	1	0	–		–		–		23	2
Piacenza	2004–05	34	3	3	1	–		–		–		37	4
Piacenza	2005–06	31	2	3	0	–		–		–		34	2
Piacenza	2006–07	28	1	0	0	–		–		–		28	1
Piacenza	Total	127	10	10	1	0	0	0	0	0	0	137	11
Sampdoria	2007–08	22	0	3	0	–		6	1	–		31	1
Sampdoria	2008–09	16	1	3	0	–		4	0	–		23	1
Sampdoria	Total	38	1	6	0	0	0	10	1	0	0	54	2
Napoli	2009–10	28	1	2	0	–		–		–		30	1
Napoli	2010–11	31	0	1	0	–		7	0	–		39	0
Napoli	2011–12	31	2	4	0	–		8	0	–		43	2
Napoli	2012–13	28	1	1	2	–		1	0	1	0	31	1
Napoli	Total	118	4	8	0	0	0	16	0	1	0	143	4
Inter Milan	2013–14	21	0	2	0	–		–		–		23	0
Inter Milan	2014–15	10	0	0	0	–		6	0	–		16	0
Inter Milan	Total	31	0	2	0	0	0	6	0	0	0	39	0
Pescara	2015–16	17	0	0	0	–		–		–		17	0
Pescara	2016–17	19	2	0	0	–		–		–		19	2
Pescara	2017–18	7	0	1	0	–		–		–		8	0
Pescara	2018–19	7	0	0	0	–		–		–		7	0
Pescara	Total	50	2	1	0	0	0	0	0	0	0	51	2
Career total		467	23	25	1	0	0	32	1	1	0	525	25

=== International ===
Appearances and goals by national team and year
National team	Year	Apps	Goals
Argentina	2012	7	0
Argentina	2013	6	0
Argentina	2014	4	0
Argentina	Total	17	0

== Honours ==
=== Club ===
Sampdoria

- Coppa Italia runner-up: 2008–09

Napoli

- Coppa Italia: 2011–12

=== International ===
Argentina

- FIFA World Cup runner-up 2014
