= 2004–05 Napoli Soccer season =

Napoli
2004–05 season
- Chairman: Aurelio De Laurentiis
- Manager: Gian Piero Ventura; Edoardo Reja
- Serie C1: 3rd (lost in playoff to Avellino)
- Top goalscorer: Roberto Sosa (8)
Home colours	Away colours	Third colours

Napoli Soccer played its first season in Serie C in 2004–05. Following the takeover of the defunct club by Aurelio De Laurentiis, a squad was completed in two weeks, with only a few players from the 2003-04 season being signed. The all-new team did not perform to the level of expectations, and lost out to Avellino in the playoff finals.

Despite the fact Napoli were playing in such a low division, they retained higher average attendances than most of the Serie A clubs, breaking the Serie C attendance record with 51,000 at one match.

== Squad ==
Note: Flags indicate national team as defined under FIFA eligibility rules; some limited exceptions apply. Players may hold more than one non-FIFA nationality.

No.	Pos.	Nation	Player
—	GK	(Italy) ITA	Emanuele Belardi
—	GK	(Italy) ITA	Matteo Gianello
—	GK	(Belgium) BEL	Olivier Renard
—	GK	(Italy) ITA	Antonio Saviano
—	DF	(Italy) ITA	Salvatore Accursi
—	DF	(Italy) ITA	Simone Bonomi
—	DF	(Italy) ITA	David Giubilato
—	DF	(Italy) ITA	Gianluca Grava
—	DF	(Italy) ITA	Giovanni Ignoffo
—	DF	(Italy) ITA	Nicola Mora
—	DF	(Italy) ITA	Tommaso Romito
—	DF	(Italy) ITA	Alberto Savino
—	DF	(Italy) ITA	Gennaro Scarlato
—	DF	(Italy) ITA	Claudio Terzi
—	MF	(Italy) ITA	Ignazio Abate
—	MF	(Italy) ITA	Marco Capparella
—	MF	(Italy) ITA	Luigi Consonni

No.	Pos.	Nation	Player
—	MF	(Sweden) SWE	Karl Corneliusson
—	MF	(Italy) ITA	Nicola Corrent
—	MF	(Italy) ITA	Gaetano Fontana
—	MF	(Italy) ITA	Fabio Gatti
—	MF	(Brazil) BRA	Leandro Guerreiro
—	MF	(Italy) ITA	Francesco Montervino
—	MF	(Italy) ITA	Cataldo Montesanto
—	MF	(Brazil) BRA	Robson Toledo
—	FW	(Italy) ITA	Emanuele Berrettoni
—	FW	(Italy) ITA	Emanuele Calaiò
—	FW	(Italy) ITA	Gennaro Esposito
—	FW	(Brazil) BRA	Piá
—	FW	(Italy) ITA	Nicola Pozzi
—	FW	(Italy) ITA	Gennaro Schettino
—	FW	(Argentina) ARG	Roberto Sosa
—	FW	(Italy) ITA	Massimiliano Varricchio

== Serie C1 ==
=== League table ===
Pos	Team	Pld	W	D	L	GF	GA	GD	Pts
1	Rimini Calcio F.C.	34	19	13	2	50	23	+27	70
2	U.S. Avellino	34	18	10	6	48	29	+19	64
3	S.S.C. Napoli	34	17	10	7	45	31	+14	61
4	S.S. Sambenedettese Calcio	34	14	12	8	38	25	+13	54
5	A.C. Reggiana 1919	34	13	15	6	41	24	+17	51 (Note: 3 points deducted)

=== Results summary ===
Overall								Home						Away					
Pld	W	D	L	GF	GA	GD	Pts	W	D	L	GF	GA	GD	W	D	L	GF	GA	GD
34	17	10	7	45	31	+14	61	12	4	1	30	12	+18	5	6	6	15	19	−4

=== Results by round ===
Round	1	2	3	4	5	6	7	8	9	10	11	12	13	14	15	16	17	18	19	20	21	22	23	24	25	26	27	28	29	30	31	32	33	34
Ground	H	A	H	A	A	H	A	H	H	A	H	A	H	A	H	A	H	A	H	A	H	H	A	H	A	A	H	A	H	A	H	A	H	A
Result	W	L	D	W	L	D	D	L	W	D	W	L	W	L	W	L	W	L	D	W	W	W	L	W	W	W	W	D	W	D	W	D	D	W

A = Away; H = Home; W = Win; D = Draw; L = Loss

=== Matches ===
26 September 2004 3	Napoli	3–3	Cittadella	Naples
	Ignoffo 8'; Savino 27'; Toledo 30'		Carteri 4'; Giacobbo 49'; De Gasperi 69'	Stadium: Stadio San Paolo; Attendance: 45,770; Referee: Fabrizio Brunialti

3 October 2004 4	Lanciano	1–2	Napoli	Lanciano
	Ticli 9'		Pozzi 37'; Abate 60'	Stadium: Stadio Guido Biondi; Attendance: 4,789; Referee: Giorgio Lops

6 October 2004 1	Napoli	1–0	Vis Pesaro	Naples
	Varricchio 90+4'			Stadium: Stadio San Paolo; Attendance: 43,881; Referee: Gabriele Gava

10 October 2004 5	Reggiana	2–0	Napoli	Reggio Emilia
	Deflorio 46'; Olorunleke 58'			Stadium: Stadio Giglio; Attendance: 17,741; Referee: Maurizio Ciampi

17 October 2004 6	Napoli	0–0	Avellino	Naples
				Stadium: Stadio San Paolo; Attendance: 61,626; Referee: Luca Marelli

21 October 2004 2	Fermana	2–0	Napoli	Fermo
	Vitali 73'; Onesti 77'			Stadium: Stadio Bruno Recchioni; Attendance: 4,500; Referee: Antonio Damato

24 October 2004 7	SPAL	0–0	Napoli	Ferrara
				Stadium: Stadio Paolo Mazza; Attendance: 6,892; Referee: Daniele Orsato

31 October 2004 8	Napoli	1–2	Chieti	Naples
	Sosa 80'		Terrevoli 53'; Guariniello 64'	Stadium: Stadio San Paolo; Attendance: 31,419; Referee: Nicola Pierpaoli

7 November 2004 9	Napoli	2–0	Benevento	Naples
	Varricchio 33'; Maschio 47' (o.g.)			Stadium: Stadio San Paolo; Attendance: 27,282; Referee: Domenico Celi

14 November 2004 10	Teramo	1–1	Napoli	Teramo
	Cardinale 70'		Varricchio 28'	Stadium: Stadio Comunale; Attendance: 2,598; Referee: Andrea Gervasoni

21 November 2004 11	Napoli	2–1	Sambenedettese	Naples
	Ignoffo 71', 90+1'		Bogliacino 69'	Stadium: Stadio San Paolo; Attendance: 46,350; Referee: Gabriele Gava

28 November 2004 12	Padova	1–0	Napoli	Padua
	Zecchin 13'			Stadium: Stadio Euganeo; Attendance: 7,894; Referee: Luca Marelli

5 December 2004 13	Napoli	2–0	Sora	Naples
	Carnevali 24' (o.g.); Sosa 30'			Stadium: Stadio San Paolo; Attendance: 24,430; Referee: Roland Herberg

8 December 2004 14	Foggia	4–1	Napoli	Foggia
	Cellini 17', 27'; Cimarelli 48'; Mounard 75'		Montesanto 45'	Stadium: Stadio Pino Zaccheria; Attendance: 9,000; Referee: Massimiliano Velotto

12 December 2004 15	Napoli	1–0	Martina	Naples
	Varricchio 5'			Stadium: Stadio San Paolo; Attendance: 22,199; Referee: Fabrizio Lena

19 December 2004 16	Rimini	2–1	Napoli	Rimini
	Ricchiuti 71', 78'		Terzi 89'	Stadium: Stadio Romeo Neri; Attendance: 6,474; Referee: Domenico Celi

6 January 2005 17	Napoli	3–0	Giulianova	Naples
	Corrent 17'; Piá 70'; Sosa 87'			Stadium: Stadio San Paolo; Attendance: 35,712; Referee: Cristian Zanzi

9 January 2005 18	Vis Pesaro	1–1	Napoli	Pesaro
	Gaeta 42'		Sosa 90+2'	Stadium: Stadio Tonino Benelli; Attendance: 3,000; Referee: Roland Herberg

16 January 2005 19	Napoli	1–1	Fermana	Naples
	Gautieri 8'		Pirro 32'	Stadium: Stadio San Paolo; Attendance: 33,373; Referee: Marco Giglioni

23 January 2005 20	Cittadella	1–3	Napoli	Cittadella
	Montervino 88' (o.g.)		Montervino 36'; Musso 41' (o.g.); Sosa 87'	Stadium: Stadio Pier Cesare Tombolato; Attendance: 2,502; Referee: Gian Luca Crugliano

30 January 2005 21	Napoli	4–1	Lanciano	Naples
	Fontana 25' (pen.); Calaiò 46', 79'; Scarlato 60'		Soncin 19'	Stadium: Stadio San Paolo; Attendance: 30,201; Referee: Antonio Damato

7 February 2005 22	Napoli	2–0	Reggiana	Naples
	Abate 14'; Calaiò 49'			Stadium: Stadio San Paolo; Attendance: 32,058; Referee: Orsato

13 February 2005 23	Avellino	2–0	Napoli	Avellino
	Rastelli 75'; Biancolino 81'			Stadium: Stadio Partenio; Attendance: 21,169; Referee: Maurizio Ciampi

27 February 2005 24	Napoli	1–0	SPAL	Naples
	Sosa 77'			Stadium: Stadio San Paolo; Attendance: 27,489; Referee: Giorgio Lops

6 March 2005 25	Chieti	0–1	Napoli	Chieti
			Calaiò 37'	Stadium: Stadio Guido Angelini; Attendance: 2,329; Referee: Massimiliano Velotto

13 March 2005 26	Benevento	0–2	Napoli	Benevento
			Piá 50'; Sosa 82'	Stadium: Stadio Santa Colomba; Attendance: 14,843; Referee: Daniele Orsato

20 March 2005 27	Napoli	1–0	Teramo	Naples
	Consonni 90'			Stadium: Stadio San Paolo; Attendance: 36,472; Referee: Denis Salati

26 March 2005 28	Sambenedettese	0–0	Napoli	San Benedetto del Tronto
				Stadium: Stadio Riviera delle Palme; Attendance: 10,000; Referee: Luca Marelli

10 April 2005 29	Napoli	2–1	Padova	Naples
	Consonni 19'; Sosa 89'		De Franceschi 50'	Stadium: Stadio San Paolo; Attendance: 40,000; Referee: Giorgio Lops

17 April 2005 30	Sora	0–0	Napoli	Sora
				Stadium: Stadio Claudio Tomei; Attendance: 4,331; Referee: Gabriele Gava

24 April 2005 31	Napoli	3–2	Foggia	Naples
	Calaiò 55'; Piá 90+2'; Scarlato 90+3'		Grieco 2'; Mounard 77'	Stadium: Stadio San Paolo; Attendance: 30,681; Referee: Massimiliano Velotto

1 May 2005 32	Martina	1–1	Napoli	Martina Franca
	Lisuzzo 33'		Calaiò 73'	Stadium: Stadio Gian Domenico Tursi; Attendance: 4,250; Referee: Roland Herberg

8 May 2005 33	Napoli	1–1	Rimini	Naples
	Piá 64'		Muslimović 44'	Stadium: Stadio San Paolo; Attendance: 34,108; Referee: Roland Herberg

15 May 2005 34	Giulianova	1–2	Napoli	Giulianova
	Ranalli 38'		Schettino 79'; Piá 84'	Stadium: Stadio Rubens Fadini; Attendance: 2,000; Referee: Denis Salati

=== Promotion play-offs ===
29 May 2005 Semi-finals; First leg	Sambenedettese	1–1	Napoli	San Benedetto del Tronto
	Bogliacino 30'		Capparella 90'	Stadium: Stadio Riviera delle Palme; Attendance: 12,000; Referee: Antonio Damato

5 June 2005 Semi-finals; Second leg	Napoli	2–0 (3–1 agg.)	Sambenedettese	Naples
	Capparella 10'; Sosa 42'			Stadium: Stadio San Paolo; Attendance: 58,585; Referee: Luca Marelli

12 June 2005 Final; First leg	Napoli	0–0	Avellino	Naples
				Stadium: Stadio San Paolo; Attendance: 63,153; Referee: Gabriele Gava

19 June 2005 Final; Second leg	Avellino	2–1 (2–1 agg.)	Napoli	Avellino
	Biancolino 39'; Moretti 46' (pen.)		Sosa 80'	Stadium: Stadio Partenio; Attendance: 21,763; Referee: Luca Marelli
