= 2006–07 AC Milan season =

Milan
2006–07 season
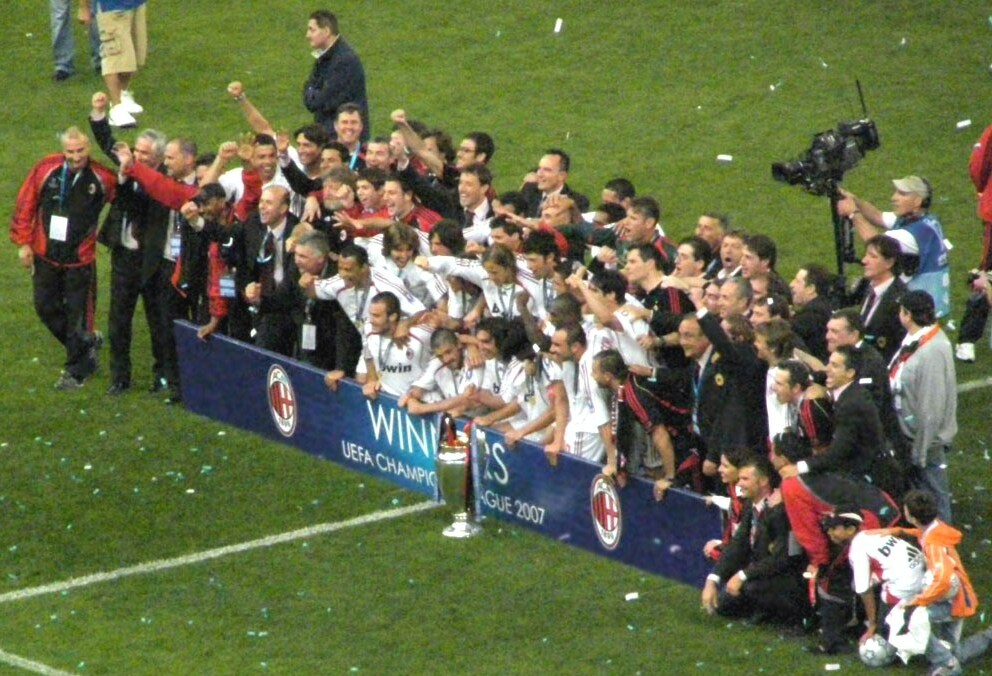
- AC Milan players celebrating winning the 2007 UEFA Champions League Final
- Chairman: Silvio Berlusconi
- Manager: Carlo Ancelotti
- Stadium: San Siro
- Serie A: 4th
- Coppa Italia: Semi-finals
- UEFA Champions League: Winners
- Top goalscorer: League: Alberto Gilardino (12); All: Kaká (18)
- Average home league attendance: 47,117
Home colours	Away colours	Third colours

During the 2006–07 season AC Milan competed in Serie A, Coppa Italia and UEFA Champions League. Milan won their record breaking 7th Champions League title avenging their loss to Liverpool in the 2005 final. As of 2026, this was the last time AC Milan has won the Champions League.

The 2006–07 season has had its ups and downs for Milan. Having started the 2006–07 Serie A season with an eight-point penalty due to the Calciopoli scandal, a poor run of results during which Milan only registered one win in nine matches left them in a lowly 15th place on only 11 points. After two consecutive losses against Atalanta and Roma, Milan had a streak of seven-straight undefeated matches. Two wins against Catania and Udinese left Milan only six points behind fourth place and qualification for the 2007–08 UEFA Champions League. Milan eventually finished fourth in Serie A, behind Lazio. After displaying poor physical condition throughout most of the fall, the team took a January retreat in Malta to regain condition and try to achieve a fourth-place finish in Serie A and further progression in the Champions League.

4–3–2–1 formation, also known as the "Christmas Tree", featured Andrea Pirlo as a deep-lying playmaker supported by ball winners Gennaro Gattuso and Massimo Ambrosini on their respective sides of the pitch, while Kaká was given the absolute creative freedom, playing as an attacking midfielder in a free role. Lacking traditional wingers among the attacking players, the team relied on Marek Jankulovski and Massimo Oddo, who played as attacking full-backs.

Milan's performances in the Champions League were a different story. Drawn in a group described as easy by some pundits, with AEK Athens, Lille and Anderlecht, Milan won the group with ten points, despite losing the last two games. In the Champions League, Milan overcame Celtic in the round of 16, Bayern Munich in the quarter-finals and Manchester United in the semi-finals. They would go on to beat Liverpool in the final, avenging their defeat in the 2005 final. Kaká was in strong form for Milan in the Champions League, scoring 10 goals in 12 matches and winning that year's Champions League Golden Boot.

== Squad ==
Note: Flags indicate national team as defined under FIFA eligibility rules; some limited exceptions apply. Players may hold more than one non-FIFA nationality.

No.	Pos.	Nation	Player
1	GK	BRA	Dida
2	DF	BRA	Cafu
3	DF	ITA	Paolo Maldini
4	DF	GEO	Kakha Kaladze
5	DF	ITA	Alessandro Costacurta
7	FW	BRA	Ricardo Oliveira
8	MF	ITA	Gennaro Gattuso
9	FW	ITA	Filippo Inzaghi
10	MF	NED	Clarence Seedorf
11	FW	ITA	Alberto Gilardino
13	DF	ITA	Alessandro Nesta
15	FW	ITA	Marco Borriello
16	GK	AUS	Zeljko Kalac
17	DF	CRO	Dario Šimić
18	DF	CZE	Marek Jankulovski
19	DF	ITA	Giuseppe Favalli
20	MF	FRA	Yoann Gourcuff

No.	Pos.	Nation	Player
21	MF	ITA	Andrea Pirlo
22	MF	BRA	Kaká
23	MF	ITA	Massimo Ambrosini
24	DF	ARG	Leandro Grimi
25	DF	ITA	Daniele Bonera
26	GK	ITA	Marco Storari
27	DF	BRA	Serginho
28	MF	ITA	Alex Guerci
29	GK	ITA	Valerio Fiori
31	DF	ITA	Luca Antonelli
32	MF	ITA	Cristian Brocchi
33	FW	ITA	Davide Di Gennaro
34	MF	ITA	Gastone Bottini
36	DF	ITA	Matteo Darmian
38	MF	ITA	Matteo Lunati
44	DF	ITA	Massimo Oddo

=== Transfers ===
In
Pos.	Name	from	Type
FW	Ricardo Oliveira	Real Betis	(€17 million)
MF	Yoann Gourcuff	Rennes	(€3 million)
DF	Daniele Bonera	Parma	
DF	Giuseppe Favalli	Inter	free
GK	Ferdinando Coppola		free
GK	Christian Abbiati	Juventus	loan ended
DF	Ignazio Abate	Piacenza	loan ended
DF	Luca Antonini	Sampdoria	co-ownership
DF	Romano Perticone	Pizzighettone	loan ended
MF	Catilina Aubameyang	Chiasso	loan ended
MF	Cristian Brocchi	Fiorentina	loan ended
MF	Samuele Dalla Bona	Sampdoria	loan ended
MF	Massimo Donati	Messina	loan ended
MF	Pasquale Foggia	Ascoli	loan ended
FW	Marco Borriello	Treviso	loan ended
FW	Alessandro Matri	Lumezzane	loan ended

Out
Pos.	Name	To	Type
FW	Andriy Shevchenko	Chelsea	(€42 million)
DF	Jaap Stam	Ajax	
MF	Rui Costa	Benfica	end of contract
MF	Samuele Dalla Bona	Napoli	
MF	Johann Vogel	Real Betis	
FW	Marcio Amoroso	Corinthians	
MF	Catilina Aubameyang	Libreville	
GK	Christian Abbiati	Torino	loan
GK	Ferdinando Coppola	Piacenza	loan
DF	Ignazio Abate	Modena	loan
DF	Luca Antonini	Siena	loan
DF	Davide Astori	Pizzighettone	loan
DF	Lino Marzorati	Empoli	loan
DF	Romano Perticone	Hellas Verona	loan
MF	Massimo Donati	Atalanta	loan
MF	Pasquale Foggia	Lazio	loan
FW	Matteo Ardemagni	Perugia	loan
FW	Vitali Kutuzov	Sampdoria	co-ownership
FW	Alessandro Matri	Rimini	loan

==== Winter ====
In
Pos.	Name	from	Type
FW	Ronaldo	Real Madrid	(€7,5 million)
DF	Massimo Oddo	Lazio	(€7,7 million)
GK	Marco Storari	Messina	
DF	Leandro Grimi	Racing Club	(€2 million)
FW	Matteo Ardemagni	Perugia	loan ended

Out
Pos.	Name	To	Type
MF	Pasquale Foggia	Lazio	
FW	Matteo Ardemagni	Pizzighettone	loan

== Competitions ==
Win Draw Loss

=== Serie A ===
==== League table ====
Pos	Team	Pld	W	D	L	GF	GA	GD	Pts	Qualification or relegation
2	Roma	38	22	9	7	74	34	+40	75	Qualification to Champions League group stage (Note: Milan qualified for 2007–08 UEFA Champions League group stage instead of third qualifying round as the title holders.)
3	Lazio (Note: Fiorentina were docked 15 points, Reggina 11 points, Milan 8 points and Lazio 3 points, all for involvement in the 2006 Italian football scandal.)	38	18	11	9	59	33	+26	62	Qualification to Champions League third qualifying round
4	Milan	38	19	12	7	57	36	+21	61	Qualification to Champions League group stage
5	Palermo	38	16	10	12	58	51	+7	58	Qualification to UEFA Cup first round
6	Fiorentina	38	21	10	7	62	31	+31	58	Qualification to UEFA Cup first round

Source: "Serie A 2006/2007 - 38. Round". worldfootball.net. 21 July 2025.
Rules for classification: 1) points; 2) goal difference; 3) number of goals scored.

==== Results summary ====
Overall								Home						Away					
Pld	W	D	L	GF	GA	GD	Pts	W	D	L	GF	GA	GD	W	D	L	GF	GA	GD
38	19	12	7	57	36	+21	69	12	3	4	30	17	+13	7	9	3	27	19	+8

Last updated: 27 May 2007.
Source: Competitive matches

==== Results by round ====
Round	1	2	3	4	5	6	7	8	9	10	11	12	13	14	15	16	17	18	19	20	21	22	23	24	25	26	27	28	29	30	31	32	33	34	35	36	37	38	39
Ground	H	A	H	A	H	A	H	A	H	A	H	A	H	A	H	A	H	A	H	A	H	P	H	A	H	A	H	A	H	A	H	A	A	H	A	H	A	H	A
Result	W	W	W	D	D	D	L	W	L	L	L	D	W	D	D	D	W	W	W	D	W	-	W	W	W	D	W	L	W	D	W	W	W	W	W	D	D	L	L
Position	17	17	12	12	12	13	14	12	14	16	16	15	15	15	15	14	13	12	9	9	9	9	7	6	5	6	6	6	5	6	5	4	4	4	3	4	3	4	4

Source: Competitive matches
A = Away; H = Home; W = Win; D = Draw; L = Loss; = Leader, 2007–08 UEFA Champions League Groups stage; = 2007–08 UEFA Champions League Groups stage; = 2007–08 UEFA Champions League Qualifying round; = 2007–08 UEFA Cup; = 2007–08 Serie B

==== Matches ====
10 September 2006 1	Milan	2–1	Lazio	Milan
15:00 CEST (UTC+02:00)	Inzaghi 27', (yellow card) 45+1'; Cafu (yellow card) 37'; Oliveira 70'; Maldini (yellow card) 79'	Report	Mudingayi (yellow card) 33'; Ledesma (yellow card) 61'; Cribari (yellow card) 69'; Makinwa 73'	Stadium: San Siro; Attendance: 44,770; Referee: Paolo Bertini

17 September 2006 2	Parma	0–2	Milan	Parma
20:30 CEST (UTC+02:00)	Paci (yellow card) 37'; De Lucia (yellow card) 85'	Report	Seedorf 25'; Bonera (yellow card) 33'; Oliveira (yellow card) 46'; Dida (yellow card) 72'; Kaká 85' (pen.)	Stadium: Stadio Ennio Tardini; Attendance: 19,746; Referee: Matteo Trefoloni

20 September 2006 3	Milan	1–0	Ascoli	Milan
20:30 CEST (UTC+02:00)	Jankulovski 67'; Ambrosini (yellow card) 90+1'	Report	Nastase (yellow card) 43'; Delvecchio (yellow card) 90'	Stadium: San Siro; Attendance: 43,085; Referee: Paolo Dondarini

23 September 2006 4	Livorno	0–0	Milan	Livorno
18:00 CEST (UTC+02:00)	Passoni (yellow card) 33'; Balleri (yellow card) 40'	Report	Nesta (yellow card) 30'; Ambrosini (yellow card) 45'; Bonera (yellow card) 70'	Stadium: Stadio Armando Picchi; Attendance: 12,456; Referee: Nicola Ayroldi

1 October 2006 5	Milan	0–0	Siena	Milan
15:00 CEST (UTC+02:00)		Report	Bertotto (yellow card) 66'; Gastaldello (yellow card) 66'; Rinaudo (yellow card) 71'; Brevi (yellow card) 90+1'	Stadium: San Siro; Attendance: 44,658; Referee: Nicola Stefanini

14 October 2006 6	Sampdoria	1–1	Milan	Genoa
18:00 CEST (UTC+02:00)	Bonazzoli 69'; Zenoni (yellow card) 71'; Delvecchio (yellow card) 84'	Report	Jankulovski (yellow card) 73'; Kaká (yellow card) 80'; Kaladze 84'; Bonera (yellow card) 90'	Stadium: Stadio Luigi Ferraris; Attendance: 25,334; Referee: Roberto Rosetti

22 October 2006 7	Milan	0–2	Palermo	Milan
20:30 CEST (UTC+02:00)	Gattuso (yellow card) 31'		Biava (yellow card) 26'; Bresciano 48'; Corini (yellow card) 57'; Diana (yellow card) 61'; Amauri 74'	Stadium: San Siro; Attendance: 50,028; Referee: Gianluca Rocchi

25 October 2006 8	Chievo	0–1	Milan	Verona
15:00 CEST (UTC+02:00)	Luciano (yellow card) 22'; Mandelli (yellow card) 69'		Jankulovski 30', (yellow card) 31'; Šimić (yellow card) 48'	Stadium: Stadio Marc'Antonio Bentegodi; Attendance: 12,343; Referee: Nicola Rizzoli

28 October 2006 9	Milan	3–4	Internazionale	Milan
20:30 CEST (UTC+02:00)	Gattuso (yellow card) 5'; Inzaghi (yellow card) 19'; Seedorf (yellow card) 30', (goal) 51'; Gilardino (yellow card) 51', (goal) 76'; Kaká 90'		Vieira (yellow card) 4'; Crespo 17'; Stanković 22'; Ibrahimović 47'; Maicon (yellow card) 54'; Materazzi 68', (yellow card) 55' (red card) 69'; Júlio César (yellow card) 88'; Burdisso (yellow card) 90+5'	Stadium: San Siro; Attendance: 78,921; Referee: Stefano Farina

5 November 2006 10	Atalanta	2–0	Milan	Bergamo
15:00 CET (UTC+01:00)	Ventola 50'; Donati (yellow card) 61'; Soncin 90+2'		Šimić (yellow card) 11'; Gourcuff (yellow card) 55'	Stadium: Stadio Atleti Azzurri d'Italia; Attendance: 23,799; Referee: Tiziano Pieri

11 November 2006 11	Milan	1–2	Roma	Milan
20:30 CET (UTC+01:00)	Brocchi 56'; Oliveira (yellow card) 61'; Brocchi (yellow card) 72'		Totti 7', 83'; De Rossi (yellow card) 61'; Mancini (yellow card) 76'; Pizarro (yellow card) 85'	Stadium: San Siro; Attendance: 55,322; Referee: Domenico Messina

18 November 2006 12	Empoli	0–0	Milan	Empoli
18:00 CET (UTC+01:00)	Moro (yellow card) 38'; Balli (yellow card) 84'		Costacurta (yellow card) 23'; Pirlo (yellow card) 28'; Brocchi (yellow card) 75'	Stadium: Stadio Carlo Castellani; Attendance: 7,327; Referee: Paolo Tagliavento

25 November 2006 13	Milan	1–0	Messina	Milan
20:30 CET (UTC+01:00)	Maldini 13'		Iuliano (yellow card) 31'; De Vezze (yellow card) 36'; Lavecchia (yellow card) 47'; Zoro (yellow card) 71'; Di Napoli (yellow card) 78'	Stadium: San Siro; Attendance: 42,515; Referee: Gabriel Gava

3 December 2006 14	Cagliari	2–2	Milan	Cagliari
15:00 CET (UTC+01:00)	Conti (yellow card) 42'; Suazo 54' (pen.); Capone 65'	Report	Gilardino 49'; Borriello 69'; Pirlo (red card) 75'	Stadium: Stadio Sant'Elia; Attendance: 20,000; Referee: Christian Brighi

10 December 2006 15	Milan	0–0	Torino	Milan
15:00 CET (UTC+01:00)	Jankulovski (yellow card) 43'	Report	Barone (yellow card) 41'; De Ascentis (yellow card) 44'	Stadium: San Siro; Attendance: 54,022; Referee: Oscar Girardi

16 December 2006 16	Fiorentina	2–2	Milan	Florence
18:00 CET (UTC+01:00)	Mutu 20' (pen.), 76'; Krøddldrup (yellow card) 28'; Dainelli (yellow card) 67'	Report	Gilardino 3', 89'; Pirlo (yellow card) 29'; Šimić (yellow card) 65'; Gattuso (yellow card) 82'; Cafu (yellow card) 87'	Stadium: Stadio Artemio Franchi; Attendance: 42,000; Referee: Massimiliano Saccani

20 December 2006 17	Milan	3–0	Catania	Milan
20:30 CET (UTC+01:00)	Kaká 4', 88'; Bonera (yellow card) 60'; Gilardino 82'; Gourcuff (yellow card) 90'	Report		Stadium: San Siro; Attendance: 40,000; Referee: Paolo Dondarini

23 December 2006 18	Udinese	0–3	Milan	Udine
15:00 CET (UTC+01:00)	Eremenko (yellow card) 16'; Pinzi (yellow card) 30'	Report	Kaká 28' (pen.); Gilardino 35'; Seedorf (yellow card) 63'; Oliveira 76'; Gattuso (yellow card) 80'	Stadium: Stadio Friuli; Attendance: 15,000; Referee: Nicola Rizzoli

14 January 2007 19	Milan	3–1	Reggina	Milan
15:00 CET (UTC+01:00)	Pirlo 6'; Seedorf 35'; Gilardino 78'	Report	Bianchi 66'	Stadium: San Siro; Attendance: 43,996; Referee: Nicola Ayroldi

21 January 2007 20	Lazio	0–0	Milan	Rome
20:30 CET (UTC+01:00)	Zauri (yellow card) 49'	Report	Bonera (yellow card) 49'	Stadium: Stadio Olimpico; Attendance: 28,948; Referee: Massimiliano Saccali

28 January 2007 21	Milan	1–0	Parma	Milan
15:00 CET (UTC+01:00)	Inzaghi 76'	(Report)	Grella (yellow card) 72'; Morfeo (yellow card) 72'	Stadium: San Siro; Attendance: 41,752; Referee: Gabriel Gava

11 February 2007 23	Milan	2–1	Livorno	Milan
15:00 CET (UTC+01:00)	Gattuso 29'; Jankulovski 68'	Report	Lucarelli 31'	Stadium: San Siro; Attendance: 21,649; Referee: Roberto Rosetti

17 February 2007 24	Siena	3–4	Milan	Siena
15:00 CET (UTC+01:00)	Vergassola 19'; Maccarone 31', 89'; Gastaldello (yellow card) 52'; Codrea (yellow card) 58'; Galloppa (yellow card) 90'	Report	Ronaldo 15', 81'; Oliveira 29' (yellow card) 45'; Pirlo (yellow card) 57'; Brocchi (red card) 78'; Ambrosini 90+4'	Stadium: Montepaschi Arena; Attendance: 11,191; Referee: Domenico Messina

25 February 2007 25	Milan	1–0	Sampdoria	Milan
20:30 CET (UTC+01:00)	Oddo (red card) 10'; Bonera (yellow card) 71'; Ambrosini 90'	Report	Falcone (yellow card) 31'; Olivera (yellow card) 35' (red card) 39'; Bonazzoli (yellow card) 53'	Stadium: San Siro; Attendance: 39,168; Referee: Nicola Ayroldi

28 February 2007 26	Palermo	0–0	Milan	Palermo
14:00 CET (UTC+01:00)	Fontana (yellow card) 7'; Guana (yellow card) 82'; Pisano (yellow card) 90+1'	Report	Favalli (yellow card) 30'; Bonera (yellow card) 63'	Stadium: Stadio Barbera; Attendance: 25,361; Referee: Simone Trefoloni

3 March 2007 27	Milan	3–1	Chievo	Milan
20:30 CET (UTC+01:00)	Gilardino 33', (yellow card) 70'; Gattuso (yellow card) 44'; Oddo 55'; Seedorf 90+3'	Report	Pellissier 17'	Stadium: San Siro; Attendance: unknown Referee: Paolo Tagliavento

11 March 2007 28	Internazionale	2–1	Milan	Milan
20:30 CET (UTC+01:00)	Ibrahimović (yellow card) 30', (goal) 75'; Cruz 54'; Samuel (yellow card) 71'; Córdoba (yellow card) 86'	Report	Ronaldo 40'; Pirlo (yellow card) 72'	Stadium: Giuseppe Meazza; Attendance: unknown Referee: Nicola Rizzoli

18 March 2007 29	Milan	1–0	Atalanta	Milan
14:00 CET (UTC+01:00)	Ambrosini 40', (yellow card) 61'; Bonera (yellow card) 64'	Report	Bernardini (yellow card) 29'; Migliaccio (yellow card) 57'; Doni (yellow card) 68'	Stadium: San Siro; Attendance: 45,491; Referee: Massimiliano Saccani

31 March 2007 30	Roma	1–1	Milan	Rome
19:30 CEST (UTC+02:00)	Mexès 3'; Cassetti (yellow card) 61'; Chivu (yellow card) 89'; Pizarro (yellow card) 90'	Report	Favalli (yellow card) 16'; Cafu (yellow card) 43'; Gilardino 61'	Stadium: Stadio Olimpico; Attendance: 43,829; Referee: Domenico Messina

7 April 2007 31	Milan	3–1	Empoli	Milan
19:30 CEST (UTC+02:00)	Ronaldo 12'; Gilardino 44' (yellow card) 45'; Gattuso (yellow card) 72'; Favalli 78'	Report	Saudati 43'; Pozzi (yellow card) 53'	Stadium: San Siro; Attendance: 45,847; Referee: Matteo Trefoloni

15 April 2007 32	Messina	1–3	Milan	Messina
14:00 CEST (UTC+02:00)	Rigano (yellow card) 28'; De Vezze (yellow card) 40'; Zanchi (yellow card) 45'; Álvarez (yellow card) 67'; Lavecchia (yellow card) 73'; Masiello 93'	Report	Kaká 14'; Favalli 30'; Gourcuff (yellow card) 33'; Pirlo (yellow card) 80'; Serginho (yellow card) 82'; Ronaldo 85'	Stadium: Stadio San Filippo; Attendance: 27,837; Referee: Roberto Rosetti

18 April 2007 22	Ascoli	2–5	Milan	Ascoli Piceno
14:00 CEST (UTC+02:00)	Melara (yellow card) 14'; Eleftheropoulos (yellow card) 24'; Di Biagio 32' (pen.); Guberti 41'; Corallo (yellow card) 43'; Lombardi (yellow card) 55'; Foglio (yellow card) 61'	Report	Gilardino 2', 27'; Kaká 25' (pen.), 35'; Gattuso (yellow card) 58'; Bonera (yellow card) 59'; Seedorf 78'	Stadium: Stadio Cino e Lillo Del Duca; Attendance: 15,648; Referee: Nicola Ayroldi
Note: Match suspended and rescheduled from 4 February 2007 due to the death of Police Inspector Filippo Raciti during the Catania football riot.

21 April 2007 33	Milan	3–1	Cagliari	Milan
19:30 CEST (UTC+02:00)	Ronaldo 14', 69'; Kaladze (yellow card) 73' (red card) 85'; Pirlo 80'	Report	López (yellow card) 33'; Conti (yellow card) 43'; Pisano (yellow card) 43'; Suazo 32' (pen.)	Stadium: San Siro; Attendance: 45,592; Referee: Mauro Bergonzi

28 April 2007 34	Torino	0–1	Milan	Turin
19:30 CEST (UTC+02:00)	Brevi (yellow card) 58' (red card) 73'	(Report)	Seedorf 26'; Gilardino (yellow card) 57'; Ronaldo (yellow card) 90'	Stadium: Stadio Olimpico; Attendance: 21,461; Referee: Domenico Messina

6 May 2007 35	Milan	0–0	Fiorentina	Milan
14:00 CEST (UTC+02:00)		Report	Gamberini (yellow card) 25'; Liverani (yellow card) 58'; Blasi (yellow card) 66'; Mutu (yellow card) 89'	Stadium: San Siro; Attendance: unknown Referee: Roberto Rosetti

13 May 2007 36	Catania	1–1	Milan	Bologna
14:00 CEST (UTC+02:00)	Spinesi 61'	(Report)	Seedorf 6'; Inzaghi (yellow card) 56'; Gattuso (yellow card) 78'; Brocchi (yellow card) 90'	Stadium: Stadio Renato Dall'Ara; Attendance: unknown Referee: Massimiliano Saccani

19 May 2007 37	Milan	2–3	Udinese	Milan
19:30 CEST (UTC+02:00)	Gourcuff 36' (yellow card) 36'; Costacurta 57' (pen.); Oliveira (yellow card) 87'	Report	Asamoah 10'; Di Natale 53'; Barreto 61' (yellow card) 62'	Stadium: San Siro; Attendance: unknown Referee: Andrea Gervasoni

27 May 2007 38	Reggina	2–0	Milan	Reggio Calabria
14:00 CEST (UTC+02:00)	Amoruso 10'; Di Dio (yellow card) 59'; Amerini 67'	Report	Gattuso (yellow card) 83'	Stadium: Stadio Oreste Granillo; Attendance: unknown Referee: Gianluca Rocchi

=== Coppa Italia ===
==== Round of 16 ====
8 November 2006	Milan	4–2	Brescia	Milan
20:30 CET (UTC+01:00)	Cafu (yellow card) 31'; Borriello 60', 86'; Brocchi 67'; Inzaghi 78'	Report	Serafini 34'; Alfageme 37'	Stadium: San Siro; Attendance: 2,000; Referee: Paolo Mazzoleni

28 November 2006	Brescia	1–2 (3–6 agg.)	Milan	Brescia
21:00 CET (UTC+01:00)	Hamšík 43'	(Report)	Oliveira 15'; Zoboli 19' (o.g.); Borriello (yellow card) 62'	Stadium: Mario Rigamonti; Attendance: 2,700

==== Quarter-finals ====
11 January 2007	Milan	2–0	Arezzo	Milan
21:00 CET (UTC+01:00)	Gilardino 35'; Inzaghi 50'	(Report)	Martinetti (yellow card) 24'; Bricca (yellow card) 55'	Stadium: San Siro; Attendance: 4,000; Referee: Andrea De Marco

18 January 2007	Arezzo	1–0 (1–2 agg.)	Milan	Arezzo
21:00 CET (UTC+01:00)	Floro Flores 53'	Report	Brocchi (yellow card) 45'; Jankulovski (yellow card) 61'	Stadium: Stadio Comunale; Attendance: 9,121; Referee: Oberdan Pantana

==== Semi-finals ====
25 January 2007	Milan	2–2	Roma	Milan
21:15 CET (UTC+01:00)	Oliveira 4'; Ambrosini (yellow card) 10'; Inzaghi 23'; Pirlo (yellow card) 65'	Report	Perrotta 29'; Pizarro 39'; Mexès (yellow card) 53'	Stadium: San Siro; Attendance: 6,045; Referee: Paolo Bertini

31 January 2007	Roma	3–1 (5–3 agg.)	Milan	Rome
21:15 CET (UTC+01:00)	Mancini 8'; Perrotta 23'; Pizarro 46'	Report	Gilardino 18'; Costacurta (yellow card) 33'	Stadium: Stadio Olimpico; Attendance: 39,249; Referee: Nicola Rizzoli

=== UEFA Champions League ===
==== Qualifying rounds ====
===== Third qualifying round =====
9 August 2006 First leg	Milan (Italy)	1–0	(Serbia) Red Star Belgrade	Milan, Italy
20:45 CEST (UTC+02:00)	Inzaghi 22'	Report	Perović (yellow card) 14'; Gueye (yellow card) 38'	Stadium: San Siro; Attendance: 70,510; Referee: Jan Wegereef (Netherlands)

22 August 2006 Second leg	Red Star Belgrade (Serbia)	1–2 (1–3 agg.)	(Italy) Milan	Belgrade, Serbia
21:00 CEST (UTC+02:00)	Gueye (yellow card) 48'; Đokić 80'	Report	Inzaghi 29'; Kaká (yellow card) 57'; Seedorf 79'	Stadium: Red Star Stadium; Attendance: 49,604; Referee: Claus Bo Larsen (Denmark)

==== Group stage ====
Pos	Team	Pld	W	D	L	GF	GA	GD	Pts	Qualification
1	(Italy) Milan	6	3	1	2	8	4	+4	10	Advance to knockout stage
2	(France) Lille	6	2	3	1	8	5	+3	9	Advance to knockout stage
3	(Greece) AEK Athens	6	2	2	2	6	9	−3	8	Transfer to UEFA Cup
4	(Belgium) Anderlecht	6	0	4	2	7	11	−4	4	

Source: RSSSF

13 September 2006 1	Milan (Italy)	3–0	(Greece) AEK Athens	Milan, Italy
20:45 CEST (UTC+02:00)	Inzaghi 17'; Maldini (yellow card) 23'; Gourcuff 41'; Kaká 76' (pen.)	Report	Cirillo (yellow card) 27'; Moras (yellow card) 64'	Stadium: San Siro; Attendance: 45,000; Referee: Mike Riley (England)

26 September 2006 2	Lille (France)	0–0	(Italy) Milan	Lens, France
20:45 CEST (UTC+02:00)	Cabaye (yellow card) 90+4'	Report	Jankulovski (yellow card) 88'	Stadium: Stade Félix Bollaert; Attendance: 22,500; Referee: Manuel Mejuto González (Spain)

17 October 2006 3	Anderlecht (Belgium)	0–1	(Italy) Milan	Anderlecht, Belgium
20:45 CEST (UTC+02:00)	Vanden Borre (yellow card) 7'	Report	Kaladze (yellow card) 25'; Bonera (yellow card) 32' (yellow-red card) 47'; Kaká 58'	Stadium: Constant Vanden Stock Stadium; Attendance: 20,129; Referee: Luis Medina Cantalejo (Spain)

1 November 2006 4	Milan (Italy)	4–1	(Belgium) Anderlecht	Milan, Italy
20:45 CET (UTC+01:00)	Kaká 6' (pen.), 22', 56'; Gattuso (yellow card) 74'; Gilardino 88', (yellow card) 89'	Report	Biglia (yellow card) 58'; Juhász 61'; Hassan (yellow card) 83'	Stadium: San Siro; Attendance: 42,300; Referee: Herbert Fandel (Germany)

21 November 2006 5	AEK Athens (Greece)	1–0	(Italy) Milan	Athens, Greece
20:45 CET (UTC+01:00)	Júlio César 32'; Tziortziopoulos (yellow card) 34'; Tőzsér (yellow card) 58'	Report	Oliveira (yellow card) 45'; Seedorf (yellow card) 75'	Stadium: Olympic Stadium; Attendance: 56,203; Referee: Eric Braamhaar (Netherlands)

6 December 2006 6	Milan (Italy)	0–2	(France) Lille	Milan, Italy
20:45 CET (UTC+01:00)		Report	Odemwingie 7'; Keïta (yellow card) 58', (goal) 67'	Stadium: San Siro; Attendance: 27,067; Referee: Graham Poll (England)

==== Knockout phase ====
===== Round of 16 =====
20 February 2007 First leg	Celtic (Scotland)	0–0	(Italy) Milan	Glasgow, Scotland
20:45	Nakamura (yellow card) 36'	Report	Maldini (yellow card) 10'; Gilardino (yellow card) 71'	Stadium: Celtic Park; Attendance: 58,785; Referee: Terje Hauge (Norway)

7 March 2007 Second leg	Milan (Italy)	1–0 (a.e.t.) (1–0 agg.)	(Scotland) Celtic	Milan, Italy
20:45	Ambrosini (yellow card) 42'; Kaká 93'	Report	McManus (yellow card) 41'; Naylor (yellow card) 56'; McGeady (yellow card) 86'; Lennon (yellow card) 104'	Stadium: San Siro; Attendance: 65,000; Referee: Konrad Plautz (Austria)

===== Quarter-finals =====
3 April 2007 First leg	Milan (Italy)	2–2	(Germany) Bayern Munich	Milan, Italy
20:45	Pirlo 40'; Gilardino (yellow card) 53'; Kaká 84' (pen.)	Report	Salihamidžić (yellow card) 33'; Van Buyten 78', 90+4', (yellow card) 84'	Stadium: San Siro; Attendance: 77,700; Referee: Yuri Baskakov (Russia)

11 April 2007 Second leg	Bayern Munich (Germany)	0–2 (2–4 agg.)	(Italy) Milan	Munich, Germany
20:45	Van Bommel (yellow card) 47'; Salihamidžić (yellow card) 63'	Report	Seedorf 27'; Inzaghi 31'	Stadium: Allianz Arena; Attendance: 65,000; Referee: Manuel Mejuto González (Spain)

===== Semi-finals =====
24 April 2007 First leg	Manchester United (England)	3–2	(Italy) Milan	Manchester, England
19:45	Ronaldo 6'; Evra (yellow card) 42'; Rooney 59', 90+1'; Giggs (yellow card) 62'	Report	Kaká 22', 37', (yellow card) 62'; Bonera (yellow card) 74'	Stadium: Old Trafford; Attendance: 73,820; Referee: Kyros Vassaras (Greece)

2 May 2007 Second leg	Milan (Italy)	3–0 (5–3 agg.)	(England) Manchester United	Milan, Italy
20:45	Kaká 11'; Seedorf 30'; Ambrosini (yellow card) 75'; Gilardino 78'; Gattuso (yellow card) 81'	Report	Ronaldo (yellow card) 84'	Stadium: San Siro; Attendance: 78,500; Referee: Frank De Bleeckere (Belgium)

===== Final =====
23 May 2007 Final	Milan (Italy)	2–1	(England) Liverpool	Athens, Greece
20:45 CEST (UTC+02:00)	Inzaghi 45', 82'; Gattuso (yellow card) 40'; Jankulovski (yellow card) 54'	Report	Mascherano (yellow card) 58'; Carragher (yellow card) 60'; Kuyt 89'	Stadium: OACA Spyro Louis Stadium; Attendance: 74,000; Referee: Herbert Fandel (Germany)

== Statistics ==
=== Players statistics ===
No.	Pos	Nat	Player	Total		Serie A		Champions League		Coppa Italia	
No.	Pos	Nat	Player	Apps	Goals	Apps	Goals	Apps	Goals	Apps	Goals
1	GK	(Brazil) BRA	Dida	41	0	25	0	13	0	3	0
2	DF	(Brazil) BRA	Cafu	35	0	21+3	0	4+4	0	3	0
25	DF	(Italy) ITA	Bonera	36	0	23+2	0	4+2	0	5	0
17	DF	(Croatia) CRO	Simic	34	0	17+5	0	5+1	0	6	0
18	DF	(Czech Republic) CZE	Jankulovski	50	3	26+7	3	11+2	0	4	0
8	MF	(Italy) ITA	Gattuso	47	1	24+6	1	12+1	0	4	0
21	MF	(Italy) ITA	Pirlo	52	3	31+3	2	13+1	1	4	0
32	MF	(Italy) ITA	Brocchi	42	2	25+4	1	4+4	0	5	1
10	MF	(Netherlands) NED	Seedorf	51	10	26+6	7	12+2	3	5	0
22	AM	(Brazil) BRA	Kaká	48	18	30+1	8	14+1	10	2	0
11	FW	(Italy) ITA	Gilardino	45	16	25+5	12	7+4	2	4	2
16	GK	(Australia) AUS	Kalac	16	0	10	0	2+1	0	3	0
23	MF	(Italy) ITA	Ambrosini	34	3	19	3	12	0	3	0
7	FW	(Brazil) BRA	Oliveira	37	5	16+10	3	4+2	0	5	2
3	DF	(Italy) ITA	Maldini	27	1	16+2	1	9	0	0	0
4	DF	(Georgia (country)) GEO	Kaladze	26	1	14+4	1	5+2	0	1	0
99	FW	(Brazil) BRA	Ronaldo	14	7	12+2	7	0	0	0	0
19	DF	(Italy) ITA	Favalli	22	2	12+3	2	1+3	0	3	0
13	DF	(Italy) ITA	Nesta	22	0	12+2	0	8	0	0	0
9	FW	(Italy) ITA	Inzaghi	37	11	11+9	2	10+2	6	5	3
20	MF	(France) FRA	Gourcuff	34	2	9+12	1	5+4	1	4	0
44	DF	(Italy) ITA	Oddo	18	1	8+2	1	7	0	1	0
15	FW	(Italy) ITA	Borriello	14	3	4+5	1	1+2	0	2	2
27	DF	(Brazil) BRA	Serginho	9	0	4+2	0	2+1	0	0	0
5	DF	(Italy) ITA	Costacurta	11	1	3	1	3	0	5	0
26	GK	(Italy) ITA	Storari	3	0	3	0	0	0	0	0
24	DF	(Argentina) ARG	Grimi	4	0	1+2	0	0	0	1	0
28	MF	(Italy) ITA	Guerci	1	0	0+1	0	0	0	0	0
29	GK	(Italy) ITA	Fiori	0	0	0	0	0	0	0	0
31	DF	(Italy) ITA	Antonelli	3	0	0+1	0	0	0	2	0
33	FW	(Italy) ITA	Di Gennaro	1	0	0+1	0	0	0	0	0
34	MF	(Italy) ITA	Bottini	1	0	0	0	0	0	1	0
36	DF	(Italy) ITA	Darmian	2	0	0+1	0	0	0	1	0
38	MF	(Italy) ITA	Lunati	1	0	0	0	0	0	1	0

- Source: http://calcio-seriea.net/presenze/2006/1302/
