= Accursi =

Accursi is a surname. Notable people with the surname include:

- Mike Accursi (born 1975), Canadian lacrosse player
- Salvatore Accursi (born 1978), Italian footballer and manager
- Taylor Accursi (born 1995), Canadian ice hockey player
