= La Vecchia =

La Vecchia is an Italian surname. Notable people with the surname include:

- Jaynee LaVecchia (born 1954), American justice
- Luigi Lavecchia (born 1981), Italian footballer
