= Matías Miramontes =

Argentine footballer (born 1981)

Personal information
- Full name: Matías Martín Miramontes
- Date of birth: 27 December 1981 (age 44)
- Place of birth: Banfield, Argentina
- Height: 1.75 m (5 ft 9 in)
- Position: Left winger

Team information
- Current team: Club Atlético Acebal

Senior career*
Years	Team	Apps	(Gls)
1999–2003	Temperley	85	(12)
2003–2005	Venezia	64	(4)
2005–2006	União de Leiria	12	(0)
2006–2007	Newell's Old Boys	10	(0)
2007–2008	Gimnasia de Jujuy	26	(0)
2008–2010	Ancona	66	(11)
2010–2011	Cremonese	9	(1)
2011	→ Triestina (loan)	13	(1)
2011–2012	Frosinone	16	(0)
2012–2013	Temperley	36	(1)
2015–	Sportivo Las Parejas	4	(1)
Total		35	(1)
- * Club domestic league appearances and goals as of 4 May 2015

Matías Martín Miramontes (born 27 December 1981) is an Argentine footballer who plays as a left winger for Atlético Acebal in Argentina. Miramontes also holds European Union nationality.

== Career ==
Miramontes started his playing career in 1999 with Temperley in the lower leagues of Argentine football. In 2003, he was signed by Italian Serie B side Venezia where he made 64 league appearances, scoring 4 goals. In 2005, he joined U.D. Leiria of Portugal, but soon returned to Argentina where he spent a season with Newell's Old Boys before joining Gimnasia de Jujuy in 2007.

In August 2008 he returned to Serie B for Ancona, signed a 2-year contract.

On 29 July 2010, he signed a 2-year contract with Cremonese. In January 2011 he was exchanged with Robson Toledo.
