= Ignazio Abate =

Italian footballer (born 1986)

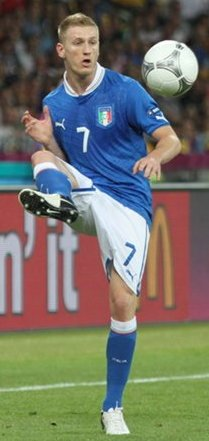
- Abate with Italy in 2012

Personal information
- Full name: Ignazio Abate
- Date of birth: 12 November 1986 (age 40)
- Place of birth: Sant'Agata de' Goti, Italy
- Height: 1.80 m (5 ft 11 in)
- Position: Right back

Team information
- Current team: Torino (head coach)

Youth career
- Rescaldina
- 1999–2004: AC Milan

Senior career*
Years	Team	Apps	(Gls)
2003–2007	AC Milan	0	(0)
2004–2005	→ Napoli (loan)	29	(2)
2005–2006	→ Piacenza (loan)	14	(0)
2006–2007	→ Modena (loan)	38	(1)
2007–2008	Empoli	24	(1)
2008–2009	Torino	25	(1)
2009–2019	AC Milan	244	(4)
Total		372	(8)

International career
2004	Italy U18	3	(0)
2005	Italy U19	2	(1)
2005–2006	Italy U20	6	(0)
2006–2009	Italy U21	10	(1)
2008	Olympic Italy	8	(1)
2011–2015	Italy	22	(1)

Managerial career
- 2024–2025: Ternana
- 2025: Ternana
- 2025–2026: Juve Stabia
- 2026–: Torino
Medal record
Men's Football
Representing Italy
UEFA European Championship
Runner-up	2012 Poland–Ukraine
FIFA Confederations Cup
Third place	2013 Brazil
- * Club domestic league appearances and goals

Ignazio Abate (Italian pronunciation: [iɲˈɲattsjo aˈbaːte]; born 12 November 1986) is an Italian professional football coach and a former player who played as a full-back. He is the head coach of Serie A club Torino.

Although naturally a winger, he could also play as a wide midfielder, wing-back, and on rare occasions, as a centre-back. As a player, Abate was renowned for his stamina, quick sprints, and ability to make attacking runs down the right flank. In his prime, he was considered one of the fastest players in the top leagues of European football.

Abate started playing football with amateur club Rescaldina, before joining Milan's youth system in 1999 and making his professional debut for the club in December 2003. From 2004 to 2009, he spent five years on various loan spells with several Italian clubs, before going back to Milan. During the 2010–11 Serie A season, Abate contributed to Milan winning their 18th Scudetto as a first-choice in the right full-back position. After ten consecutive seasons with Milan and 306 competitive appearances for the team, Abate became a free agent in July 2019 and announced his retirement as a player in 2020. In 2021, he returned to the club as a youth coach.

Abate has represented the Italy national team and the Italy U21 national team, and also played for the Italian U19 national team and the Italian U20 national team. Prior to starring for the senior team, he represented his country in the 2008 Summer Olympics and 2009 European U-21 Championship. He made his senior international debut in November 2011, in a friendly match against Poland, and has since then represented the country in UEFA Euro 2012, winning a runners-up medal, at the 2013 FIFA Confederations Cup, winning a bronze medal, and at the 2014 FIFA World Cup. Nearly two years after his debut, Abate scored his first international goal against Germany in November 2013.

== Early years ==
Abate was born in Sant'Agata de' Goti, the son of former Italian goalkeeper Beniamino Abate, now a coach with the Milan youth academy.

== Club career ==
=== Early career ===
Abate started playing football with amateur club Rescaldina, before joining AC Milan's youth system in 1999. During the 2003–04 season, he made his professional debut, playing in a Coppa Italia game against Sampdoria on 3 December. He made his debut, in European competitions, in a Champions League group-stage game versus Celta Vigo on 9 December. In that match, he set the record as the youngest Milan player to ever play in the UEFA Champions League, at 17 years and 27 days.

=== Various loan spells (2004–2007) ===
For the 2004–05 season, he was loaned out to Napoli in Serie C1, where he made 29 appearances and scored 2 goals. Initially set to spend the 2005–06 season on loan at Serie A side Sampdoria, his proposed loan to the Blucerchiati was terminated by his parent club, who then loaned him to Serie B side Piacenza, where he made 13 appearances. The following campaign was more successful for the young winger, who made 38 appearances during his loan spell at Modena.

=== Serie A debut (2007–2009) ===
In the 2007–08 season, Abate eventually made his Serie A debut, after being acquired by Empoli in a co-ownership deal, for €900,000. That year, he also scored his first goal in Serie A, in a match against Genoa, on 27 April 2008. Following Empoli's relegation, Milan fully purchased him for €2 million as well as Luca Antonini for €2.75M (and sold Nicola Pozzi and Lino Marzoratti for €4.75M total fee) only to send him to Torino in another co-ownership deal, for €2 million. Despite an early injury, he had a good season, featuring in 25 games and scoring 1 goal.

=== Back to AC Milan ===
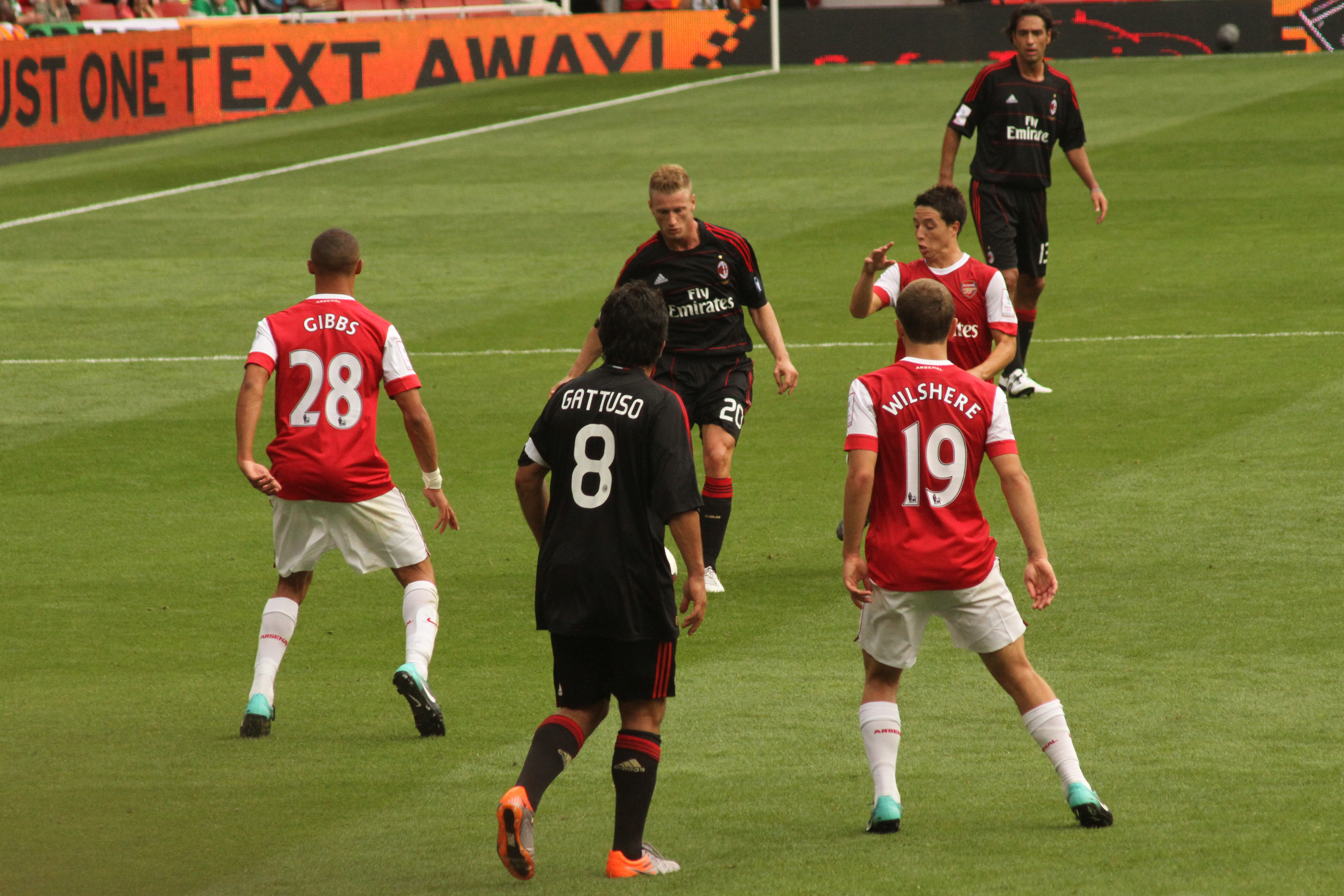
Abate playing for Milan against Arsenal.

On 24 June 2009, Milan reclaimed Abate for €2.55 million and this time he was included in the team squad for the upcoming 2009–10 season. After serving mainly as a reserve midfielder in the first few games, he later started to be employed as the regular right back by Milan head coach, Leonardo. He made 36 appearances in his first season back at Milan. Due to his good performances, on 11 February 2010 he was offered and signed an extension to his contract until 2014.

New coach Allegri kept him in the same position for the 2010–11 season. His dribbling skills and speed in the right wing allowed him to outrun opponent defenders, while his crossing into the centre also resulted in goals regularly. His solid defensive play also lent a hand in winning Milan their 18th Scudetto and the Supercoppa Italiana. He made 37 appearances in total in his second season back at Milan. The following season, Abate was again the starting right back at Milan, making 40 appearances in all competitions. On 25 September 2013, Abate scored his first Milan goal after nearly a decade since his debut, a 92-minute equalizer in a 3–3 away draw against Bologna.

In the 2014–15 season, Abate captained Milan for the first time in his career, the first time in a 2–0 loss to Palermo on 2 November 2014. Abate made his 200th Milan appearance on 9 May 2015 in a 2–1 win over Roma. On 11 June 2015, Milan announced Abate had signed a contract extension to keep him at the club until 2019.

Abate played as a regularly starting right-back in the 2015–16 season. One notable moment for him occurred on 22 February 2016, when he made an excellent sliding tackle on Lorenzo Insigne on the right wing, preventing him from scoring a second goal in a 1–1 away draw against Napoli.

In late March 2017, after initially being sidelined for Milan's following fixtures against Chievo, Juventus, and Genoa, Abate was ruled out for the remainder of the 2016–17 season, due to requiring surgery after suffering "blunt force trauma" to his left eye, after being hit by a ball in the face during a match against Sassuolo on 26 February.

In late 2018, Abate temporarily assumed the role of a centre-back in the wake of an unexpected severe injury crisis that struck the team's defence. In this role, he was praised for his performances by the club's coach, Gennaro Gattuso, and various Italian media outlets alike.

On 19 May 2019, Abate made his final home appearance for Milan in a 2–0 win over Frosinone at the San Siro stadium. During the match, the Milan Ultras of the Curva Sud saluted him by holding up a banner with the message "10 years of commitment and humility. You've gained the respect of the Ultras. Thank you Ignazio." Abate cried after seeing the message. His final appearance for the club came a week later, in a 3–2 away win over SPAL on 26 May.

== International career ==
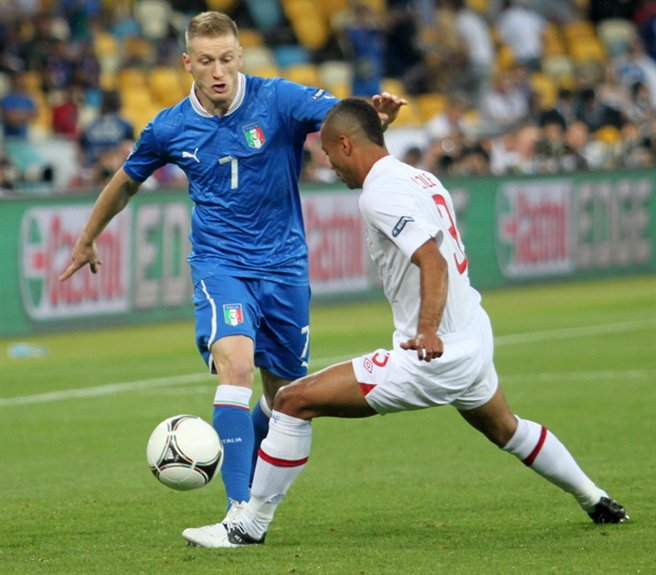
Abate (left) in action for Italy against England in the quarter-final of UEFA Euro 2012

After playing at various levels of youth international football for Italy, at under-19 and under-20 level, Abate made his debut with the Italian under-21 side in a friendly against Luxembourg, coming off the bench during the second half, on 12 December 2006.

With the Olympic national team coached by Casiraghi, he won the 2008 Toulon Tournament, in which he played four games and scored a goal against the United States. He also took part in the 2008 Summer Olympics in Beijing. He then participated in the 2009 European U-21 Championship held in Sweden, making two appearances as Italy reached the semi-finals.

Abate made his senior international debut for Italy in November 2011, in a friendly match against Poland. Abate was a member of the Italian squad that reached the UEFA Euro 2012 final.

Abate also took part in the 2013 FIFA Confederations Cup for Italy, making three appearances in the group stage before suffering an injury which kept him out of the semi-finals, as Italy went on to win a bronze medal. Nearly two years after his debut, Abate scored his first international goal in a friendly match against Germany in November 2013, which ended in a 1–1 draw. He was part of Cesare Prandelli's 23-man Italy squad for the 2014 FIFA World Cup held in Brazil, making one appearance throughout the tournament, in Italy's 1–0 defeat against Costa Rica in their second group match, as Italy were eliminated in the group stage.

== Managerial career ==
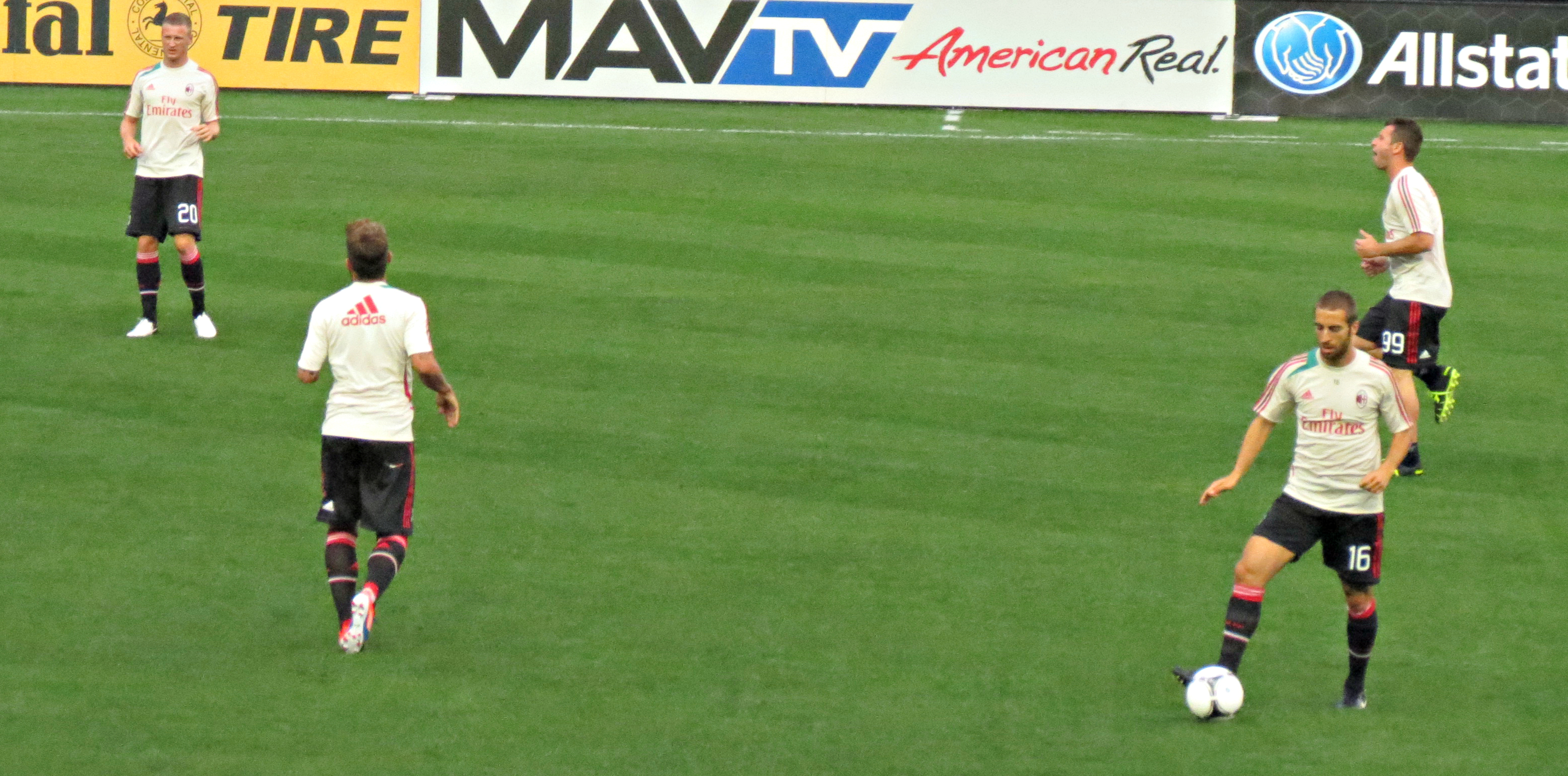
Abate warming up with AC Milan

On 2 July 2021, Abate was appointed as AC Milan's under-16 side coach. In the 2021–22 season, he led Milan U16 to reach the league final, then lost to Roma. On 5 July 2022, Milan announced Abate's promotion as coach of the under-19 side. On 21 June 2024, Abate took on his first head coaching role, becoming the new manager of Serie C club Ternana. On 6 February 2025 Ternana sacked Abate, only to rehire him the following day. He was sacked once again on 1 April 2025, following a 1–4 loss against Lucchese, despite the team being in second place in the league only behind Virtus Entella.

On 18 June 2025, Abate was announced as the new head coach of Serie B club Juve Stabia.

== Personal life ==
Abate and his wife Valentina have three sons, Matteo (born 19 November 2011), Andrea (born 14 May 2013) and Benjamin (born 23 February 2018). The couple got married on 18 June 2015.

== Career statistics ==
=== Club ===
Appearances and goals by club, season and competition
Club	Season	League			Coppa Italia		Europe		Other		Total	
Club	Season	Division	Apps	Goals	Apps	Goals	Apps	Goals	Apps	Goals	Apps	Goals
AC Milan	2003–04	Serie A	0	0	1	0	1 (Note: Appearance(s) in UEFA Champions League)	0	—		2	0
AC Milan	2004–05	Serie A	0	0	0	0	0	0	—		0	0
AC Milan	2005–06	Serie A	0	0	0	0	0	0	—		0	0
AC Milan	2006–07	Serie A	0	0	0	0	0	0	—		0	0
AC Milan	Total		0	0	1	0	1	0	0	0	2	0
Napoli (loan)	2004–05	Serie C1	29	2	0	0	—		4 (Note: Appearances in Serie C1 promotion playoffs)	0	33	2
Piacenza (loan)	2005–06	Serie B	13	0	0	0	—		—		13	0
Modena (loan)	2006–07	Serie B	38	1	3	0	—		—		41	1
Empoli	2007–08	Serie A	24	1	2	1	2 (Note: Appearances in UEFA Europa League)	0	—		28	2
Torino	2008–09	Serie A	25	1	2	0	—		—		27	1
AC Milan	2009–10	Serie A	30	0	1	0	5	0	—		36	0
AC Milan	2010–11	Serie A	29	0	2	0	6	0	—		37	0
AC Milan	2011–12	Serie A	29	0	2	0	8	0	1 (Note: Appearance in Supercoppa Italiana)	0	40	0
AC Milan	2012–13	Serie A	27	0	2	0	4	0	—		33	0
AC Milan	2013–14	Serie A	19	1	1	0	8	0	—		28	1
AC Milan	2014–15	Serie A	23	0	2	0	—		—		25	0
AC Milan	2015–16	Serie A	27	1	1	0	—		—		28	1
AC Milan	2016–17	Serie A	23	0	2	0	—		1	0	26	0
AC Milan	2017–18	Serie A	17	1	2	0	8	0	—		27	1
AC Milan	2018–19	Serie A	19	0	2	0	3	0	—		24	0
AC Milan	Milan total		243	3	18	0	43	0	2	0	306	3
Career total			372	8	25	1	45	0	6	0	448	9

=== International ===
Appearances and goals by national team and year
National team	Year	Apps	Goals
Italy	2011	1	0
Italy	2012	6	0
Italy	2013	10	1
Italy	2014	4	0
Italy	2015	1	0
Total		22	1

Scores and results list Italy's goal tally first, score column indicates score after each Abate goal.

List of international goals scored by Ignazio Abate
No.	Date	Venue	Opponent	Score	Result	Competition
1	15 November 2013	San Siro, Milan, Italy	Germany	1–1	1–1	Friendly

== Managerial statistics ==
As of match played 21 November 2026

Managerial record by team and tenure
Team	Nat	From	To	Record								Ref
Team	Nat	From	To	G	W	D	L	GF	GA	GD	Win %	Ref
Ternana	(Italy)	21 June 2024	1 April 2025	35	21	9	5	63	23	+40	60.00	
Juve Stabia	(Italy)	18 June 2025	12 June 2026	42	12	19	11	48	51	−3	28.57	
Torino	(Italy)	12 June 2026	present	14	5	2	7	16	19	−3	35.71	
Total				91	38	30	23	127	93	+34	41.76	—

== Honours ==
AC Milan

- Serie A: 2010–11
- Supercoppa Italiana: 2011, 2016

Italy U-21

- Toulon Tournament: 2008

Italy

- UEFA European Championship runner-up: 2012
