= Giovanni Ignoffo =

Italian footballer and manager

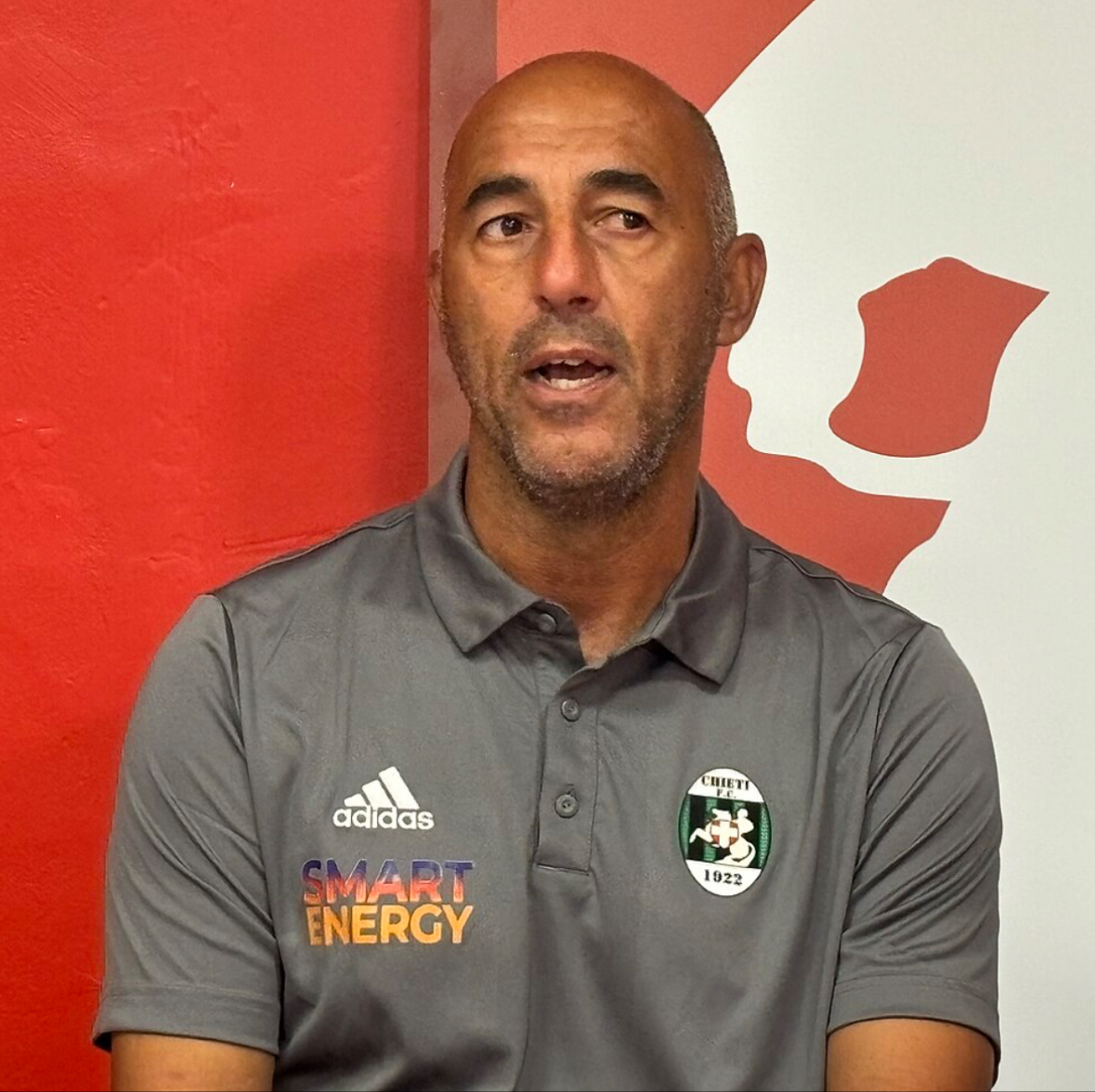

Personal information
- Full name: Giovanni Battista Ignoffo
- Date of birth: 3 April 1977 (age 49)
- Place of birth: Monreale, Italy
- Height: 1.84 m (6 ft 0 in)
- Position: Centre back

Youth career
- 1987–1988: Monreale
- 1988–1995: Palermo

Senior career*
Years	Team	Apps	(Gls)
1995–1999	Palermo	38	(0)
1996–1997	→ Leffe (loan)	29	(0)
2000	Marsala	13	(0)
2000–2003	Avellino	93	(4)
2003–2004	Perugia	14	(1)
2004–2005	Napoli	32	(3)
2005–2006	Salernitana	32	(0)
2006–2008	Foggia	60	(3)
2008–2010	Benevento	43	(1)
2010–2012	Siracusa	50	(2)
2012–2014	Messina	50	(2)
Total		454	(16)

Managerial career
- 2016–2017: Benevento U19
- 2017–2019: Palermo U17
- 2019: Avellino
- 2020–2021: Siracusa
- 2021: San Luca
- 2022–2023: Acireale
- 2023–2024: Ragusa
- 2024: Chieti
- 2026: Marsala
- 2026–: FBC Gravina
- * Club domestic league appearances and goals

Giovanni Battista Ignoffo (born 3 April 1977) is an Italian professional football manager and a former player. He is currently as a manager for Italian Serie D club FBC Gravina.

== Playing career ==
A defender, Ignoffo started his career in his native Sicily, making his professional debut with Palermo.

He played 14 games and scored 1 goal in the Serie A in the 2003–04 season for Perugia Calcio.

== Coaching career ==
After retirement, he joined Benevento as a youth coach in 2014. He left Benevento in 2017 to become the Under-17 coach of Palermo.

On 1 August 2019 he was named new head coach of Serie C club Avellino, a former club of his as a player. The season started well, with 3 victories in first 4 games and 5th spot in the standings. However, on 16 October 2019, Avellino dismissed him, with the club gaining 1 point in 5 latest games and dropping to 14th position in the table.

On 18 August 2021, he was hired as a head coach by Serie D club San Luca. After starting the season with three victories, the club then gained four ties and three losses in the following seven games, and Ignoffo was fired on 9 November 2021.

On 27 December 2022, Ignoffo was confirmed as the new head coach of Serie D club Acireale.

After completing the season with Acireale, on 25 June 2023 Ignoffo signed for fellow Serie D club Ragusa.

== Honours ==
Perugia

- UEFA Intertoto Cup: 2003
