= Alex Guerci =

Italian footballer (born 1989)

Personal information
- Full name: Alex Guerci
- Date of birth: 31 July 1989 (age 37)
- Place of birth: Soresina, Italy
- Height: 1.76 m (5 ft 9 in)
- Position: Defensive midfielder

Team information
- Current team: Soresinese

Youth career
- AC Milan

Senior career*
Years	Team	Apps	(Gls)
2006–2008	AC Milan	1	(0)
2008–2012	Pergocrema	31	(1)
2012	Lecco	1	(0)
2012–2013	Pergolettese	31	(4)
2013–2014	Alzano Cene	21	(2)
2014–2015	Aurora Seriate	27	(1)
2015	USD Grumellese	8	(0)
2015–2016	RapalloBogliasco	17	(0)
2016–2017	Massese	30	(1)
2017–2018	Pergolettese	19	(0)
2018–2019	Ciliverghe Mazzano	29	(0)
2019	Sant'Angelo		
2019-2022	SSD Mapello		
2022-	Soresinese		
- * Club domestic league appearances and goals as of 16:01, 6 November 2019 (UTC)

Alex Guerci (born 31 July 1989) is an Italian professional footballer who plays as a midfielder for Soresinese

== Club career ==
=== A.C. Milan ===
Guerci got his first first-team call-up for a Champions League match against Anderlecht, on 17 October 2006 and managed to get a spot on the bench, due to Kaladze's last minute injury. He was also on the bench in a Coppa Italia game against Brescia and, due to the large number of injured players, in another Champions League match against AEK Athens.

He made his first-team debut as a second-half substitute for Leandro Grimi in a 2-3 loss at San Siro against Udinese on 19 May 2007.

=== Pergocrema ===
In June 2008, Guerci was transferred to Pergocrema in a co-ownership deal and was fully acquired the following season.
