= Stadio Claudio Tomei =

Football stadium in Frosinone province, Italy

Coordinates: 41°43′03″N 13°37′19″E

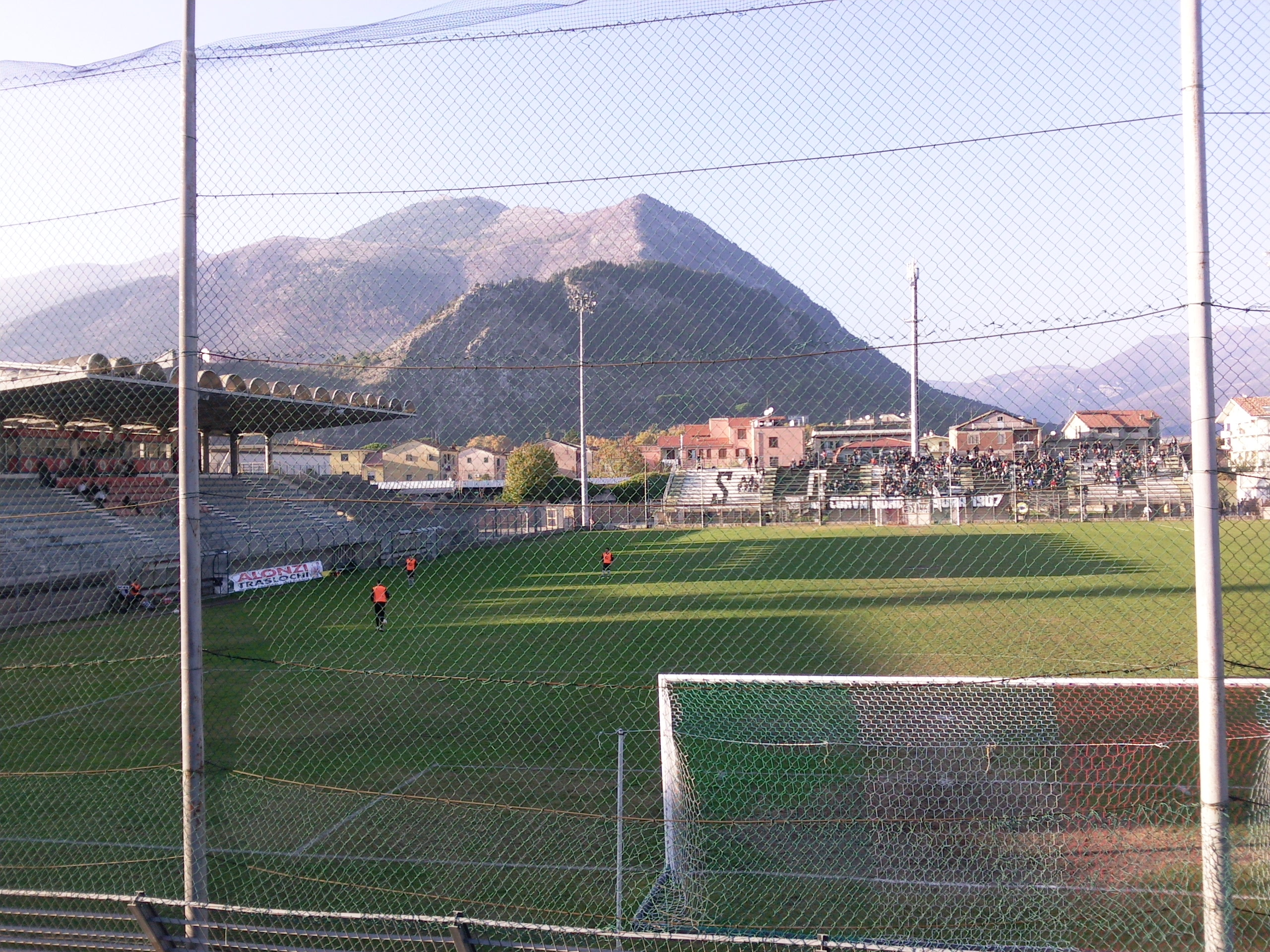
- Stadio Sora 2011
- Interactive map of Stadio Claudio Tomei
- Location: Sora, Italy
- Capacity: 3,950

Construction
- Built: 1928
- Renovated: 2014

Tenant
- A.S.D. G.C. Sora

Stadio Claudio Tomei is a stadium in Sora, Italy. It is primarily used for football, and was the home to the A.S.D. G.C. Sora. It opened in 1928 and holds 3,950 spectators.
