= Luca Antonini =

Italian footballer

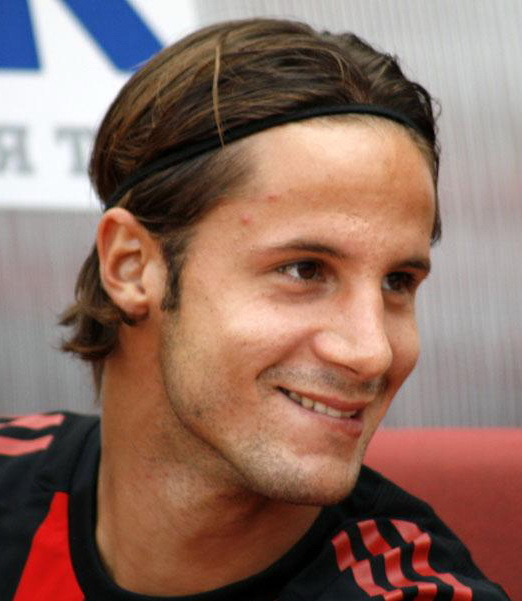
- Antonini in 2008

Personal information
- Full name: Luca Antonini
- Date of birth: 4 August 1982 (age 44)
- Place of birth: Milan, Italy
- Height: 1.82 m (6 ft 0 in)
- Position: Left-back

Youth career
- 1990–2001: Milan

Senior career*
Years	Team	Apps	(Gls)
2001–2003	Milan	0	(0)
2001–2002	→ Prato (loan)	26	(3)
2002–2003	→ Ancona (loan)	17	(1)
2003–2007	Sampdoria	3	(0)
2004–2005	→ Modena (loan)	15	(1)
2005	→ Pescara (loan)	22	(3)
2005–2006	→ Arezzo (loan)	39	(3)
2006–2007	→ Siena (loan)	32	(3)
2007–2008	Empoli	32	(0)
2008–2013	Milan	81	(1)
2013–2015	Genoa	33	(3)
2015	Ascoli	14	(1)
2016	→ Livorno (loan)	16	(0)
2016	Prato	9	(0)
Total		339	(19)

International career
1999	Italy U-17	1	(0)
2000–2001	Italy U-18	4	(0)
- * Club domestic league appearances and goals as of 11:56, 18 June 2016 (UTC)

Luca Antonini (Italian pronunciation: [ˈluːka antoˈniːni]; born 4 August 1982) is an Italian former professional footballer who played as a left-back. He is best known for his five seasons with AC Milan, for which he played from 2008 until 2013. During that time, he made 111 appearances for the club in all competitions, scored one goal, and won the 2010–11 Serie A as the team's starting left-back.

== Club career ==
=== Early career ===
Antonini started his career at Milan, originally as a winger, playing for 11 years in their youth teams. At the start of the 2001–02 season, he was loaned out to Serie C2 side Prato, where he made his professional debut, totalling 26 appearances and scoring 3 goals. The following year, he made 17 appearances and scored one goal in his first Serie B season, during a loan spell at Ancona. The team got promoted to Serie A and Antonini's contribution was significant, as he became a regular in the second half of the season.

=== Sampdoria (2003–2004) ===
In June 2003 he moved to Sampdoria in a co-ownership deal with the Rossoneri, for €2 million. In exchange, Ikechukwu Kalu moved to Milan in co-ownership deal for €1 million. He did not get much playing time, as he served mainly as a backup winger for Gasbarroni. However, he made his Serie A debut on 14 December, in an away match against Perugia.

=== Various loan spells (2004–2007) ===
The following season, he returned to play in Serie B, being first loaned out to Modena and then switching, during the January transfer window, to Pescara. Still seeking more playing time, for the 2005–06 season he moved to Arezzo on another loan spell, where he finally managed to play regularly throughout the whole season, making 39 appearances and scoring 3 goals.

At the beginning of the 2006–07 season, the then 24-year-old midfielder was sent to Siena on a fourth consecutive loan spell and faced his second Serie A season, which proved much more successful than the first one. He made 32 appearances and scored 3 goals. In particular, his very first goal in the top-tier came on 26 November, in a home game against Fiorentina.

=== Empoli (2007–2008) ===
Prior to the start of the 2007–08 season, Milan reclaimed Antonini for €1 million and sent him to Empoli also for €1 million, along with his future teammate Ignazio Abate (the 50% valued €0.9 million), in a new co-ownership deal. With Empoli, Antonini made his debut in European competitions on 20 September 2007, in a UEFA Cup first-round game against Zürich, also scoring a penalty. Despite the team being relegated, he had an extremely good season, also showing versatility when coach Alberto Malesani started to employ him as a full-back.

=== Return to Milan (2008–2013) ===
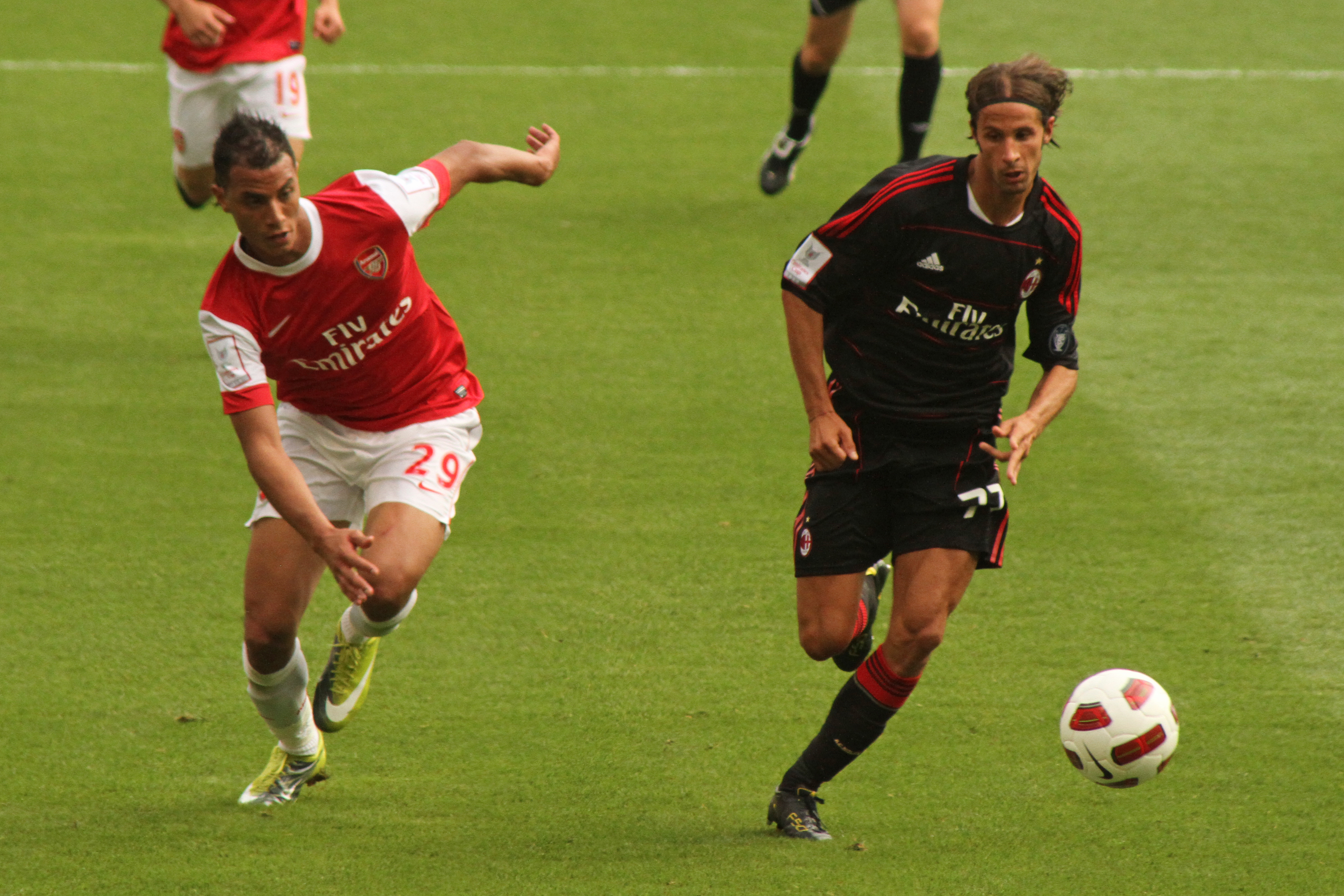
Antonini (right) and Marouane Chamakh of Arsenal in action for the Emirates Cup 2010

On 9 June 2008, Antonini was brought back by Milan and included in their squad for €2.75 million plus €150,000 other fee, in a pure player swap. (Antonini and Abate to Milan for a total fee of €4.75 million, Pozzi and Marzoratti to Empoli for a total fee of €4.75 million)

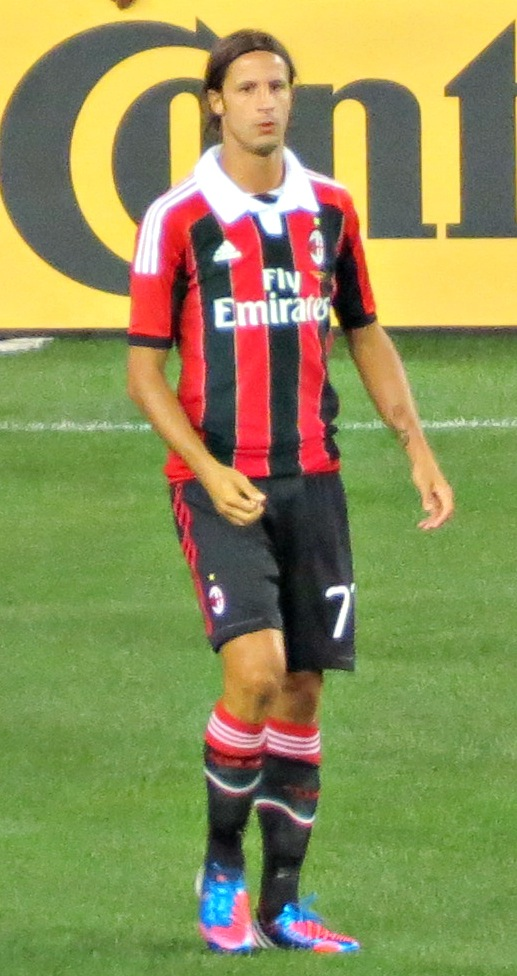
Antonini in action for A.C. Milan in 2012

In his first season with the Rossoneri, he did not get much playing time though, making only 11 league appearances. For the 2009–10 campaign, Milan signed a new head coach Leonardo, who initially did not seem to take Antonini into much consideration. However, as the season progressed, injuries to first-string players such as Zambrotta and Jankulovski prompted the Brazilian to put him in the line-up. Antonini seized his chance and earned Leonardo's trust by constantly performing well.

His valuable performances also persuaded the club to offer him a contract extension until 2014, which was signed on 11 February 2010. He finished his second year at Milan on a high, scoring his first goal for the Rossoneri in the last match of the season, a home game against Juventus, on 15 May 2010.

When new coach Massimiliano Allegri was appointed in the summer of 2010, he kept Antonini at the left-back position and Luca was a regular in the starting XI for the whole of the 2010–11 season, helping Milan win their 18th Scudetto. He continued to be a regular for the 2011–12 season, where Milan disappointingly finished second to Juventus but managed to win the Supercoppa Italiana in the summer of 2011.

=== Genoa (2013–2015) ===
At the start of the 2013–14 season, Antonini left Milan to join Genoa as part of a deal which saw midfielder Valter Birsa move the other way. He made 26 appearances in Serie A, scoring two goals, in his first season with the Grifone. The following season, he made just seven appearances and was then released by the club.

=== Ascoli and Livorno loan (2015–2016) ===
Antonini joined Serie B side Ascoli on 4 September 2015. On 1 February 2016, he moved to Livorno on a half-season loan.

=== Return to Prato (2016) ===
On 22 July 2016, Antonini signed with Prato in Lega Pro, the team with which he originally made his professional debut.

On 23 November 2016, Prato has announced that Antonini's contract was mutually terminated following his willingness to end his playing career. As revealed in the press release, Antonini will be appointed as a member of staff in the youth sector of the club.

== International career ==
Antonini made up a total of 5 caps with Italy U-17 and U-18, between 1999 and 2001. However, he did not receive any further call-up at higher levels of youth international football.

Nine years later, Antonini got his first call-up for the senior team; newly appointed coach Cesare Prandelli named him in the squad for a friendly against Ivory Coast, to be played on 10 August 2010. However, he was left as an unused substitute.

== Style of play ==
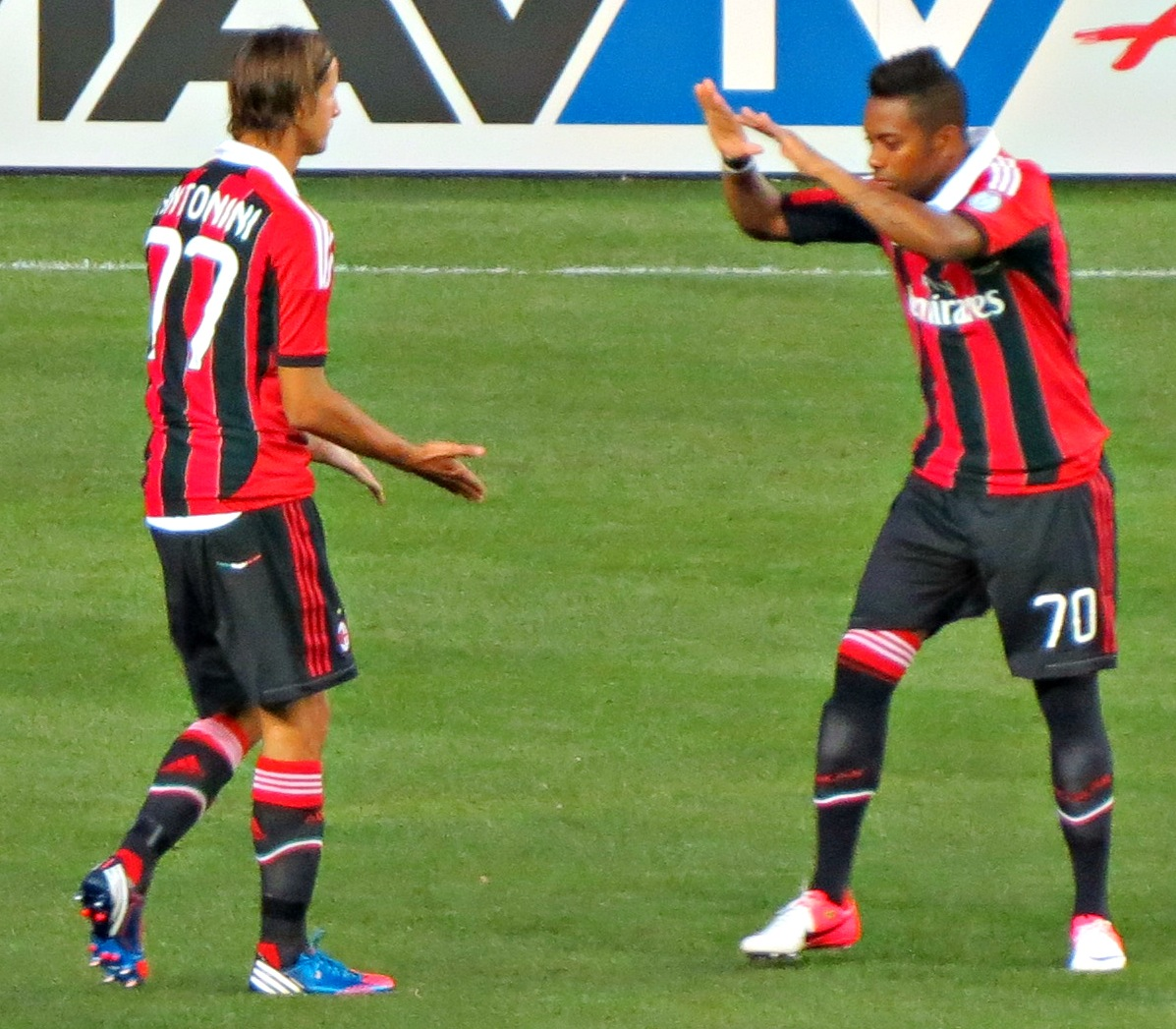
Antonini with Robinho

In his youth, Antonini was as a winger but later played as a full-back in his professional career. He is naturally right-footed and could play on either flank. His running speed and stamina helped him to contribute both offensively and defensively to his teams.

== Personal life ==
Antonini is married to Benedetta Balleggi, whom he first met at the time he was in Prato. The couple have two daughters, Sofia Vittoria (b. 2007) and Viola Maria (b. 2010).

== Career statistics ==
Updated 31 January 2018.

Team	Season	Domestic League		Domestic Cup		European Competition^{1}		Other Tournaments^{2}		Total	
Team	Season	Apps	Goals	Apps	Goals	Apps	Goals	Apps	Goals	Apps	Goals
Prato	2001–02	26	3	0	0	–		4	0	30	3
Ancona	2002–03	17	1	2	0	–		–		19	1
Sampdoria	2003–04	3	0	4	1	–		–		7	1
Modena	2004–05	15	1	0	0	–		–		15	1
Pescara	2005	22	3	–		–		–		22	3
Arezzo	2005–06	39	3	1	0	–		–		40	3
Siena	2006–07	32	3	2	0	–		–		34	3
Empoli	2007–08	32	0	2	1	2	1	–		36	2
Milan	2008–09	11	0	1	0	6	0	–		18	0
Milan	2009–10	22	1	1	0	2	0	–		25	1
Milan	2010–11	22	0	0	0	1	0	–		23	0
Milan	2011–12	20	0	0	0	4	0	0	0	24	0
Milan	2012–13	6	0	1	0	2	0	–		9	0
Milan	Total	81	1	3	0	17	0	0	0	111	1
Genoa	2013–14	26	2	–		–		–		26	2
Genoa	2014–15	7	1	1	0	–		–		8	1
Genoa	Total	33	3	1	0	0	0	0	0	34	3
Ascoli	2015–16	14	1	–		–		–		14	1
Livorno	2015–16	16	0	–		–		–		16	0
Prato	2016–17	9	0	2	1	–		–		11	1
Career Total		324	18	17	3	17	1	4	0	374	22

^{1}European competitions include UEFA Champions League and UEFA Cup
^{2}Other tournaments include Supercoppa Italiana and Coppa Italia Serie C

== Honours ==
AC Milan

- Serie A: 2010–11
- Supercoppa Italiana: 2011
