= Luigi Consonni =

Italian former footballer

Personal information
- Full name: Luigi Consonni
- Date of birth: 7 February 1977 (age 49)
- Place of birth: Seregno, Italy
- Height: 1.83 m (6 ft 0 in)
- Position: Midfielder

Youth career
- Juventus

Senior career*
Years	Team	Apps	(Gls)
1995–1996	Juventus	0	(0)
1996–2000	Fiorenzuola	98	(6)
2000–2001	Rimini	30	(6)
2001–2002	Pistoiese	34	(1)
2002–2003	Cosenza	15	(0)
2003	→ Salernitana (loan)	9	(0)
2003–2005	SPAL	45	(4)
2005	Napoli	15 (18)	(2)
2005–2012	Grosseto	198 (204)	(10)
2012–2014	Albinia	38	(7)
2014–2017	Roselle	65 (66)	(6)
- * Club domestic league appearances and goals

Luigi Consonni (born 7 February 1977) is an Italian former footballer who last played as a midfielder for Italian club Grosseto in Serie B.

== Career ==
A native of Lombardy, Consonni started his career at the Italian team Juventus. He joined the Serie C1 team Fiorenzuola in 1996. He spent the next five years playing at Serie C1 and Serie C2 (Fiorenzuola and Rimini).

On 21 June 2002, he joined the Serie B team Cosenza.

He joined Napoli in 2005 and finally Grosseto, his last professional team. With the maremmani he played 198 games and scored 10 goals as the team's captain.

He played for amateur teams Albinia and Roselle before his retirement in 2017.
