= Gianpietro Zecchin =

Italian footballer and coach

Personal information
- Date of birth: 5 May 1983 (age 43)
- Place of birth: Camposampiero, Italy
- Height: 1.68 m (5 ft 6 in)
- Position: Left midfielder

Team information
- Current team: Mestre (head coach)

Youth career
- Padova

Senior career*
Years	Team	Apps	(Gls)
2001–2007	Padova	113	(17)
2001–2003	→ Südtirol (loan)	63	(12)
2007–2009	Grosseto	21	(0)
2008–2009	→ Ravenna (loan)	26	(3)
2009–2015	Varese	192	(19)
2016	Campodarsego	9	(0)
2016–2018	Mestre	42	(5)

International career
2003–2004	Italy U20 "C"		

Managerial career
- 2018–2021: Mestre
- 2021: Manzanese
- 2021–: Mestre
- * Club domestic league appearances and goals

Gianpietro Zecchin (born 5 May 1983) is an Italian football coach and a former player. He is the head coach of Mestre.

== Biography ==
Born in Camposampiero, the province of Padua (Italian: Padova), Veneto, Zecchin started his career at Calcio Padova. After the club promoted to Serie C1 in 2001, Zecchin spent 2 seasons in Serie C2 club South Tyrol. In 2003 Zecchin returned to the city of Padua and spent 4 seasons. However the club failed to promote to Serie B from Serie C1. In June 2006 Zecchin signed a new 2-year contract and again in late August 2007 However, on 30 August 2007 Zecchin was sold to Serie B club Grosseto in co-ownership deal. Zecchin played 21 times in his first Serie B season, mainly as substitutes. In June 2008 Grosseto bought Zecchin outright. In August 2008 Zecchin left for 2008–09 Lega Pro Prima Divisione newcomer Ravenna, which the team just relegated from the second division. In August 2009 Zecchin moved to another third division club Varese in temporary deal, where he won his first promotion to Serie B. In June 2010 Varese bought Zecchin outright. Since promoted Varese almost promoted again 2012 (losing finalists of promotion playoffs). In August 2012 Zecchin added one more year to his contract to last until 30 June 2014.

== Coaching career ==
After being offered a role as the head coach of Mestre, Zecchin retired and accepted the offer. He was officially appointed as the club's new head coach on 16 July 2018.

On 19 June 2021, he moved to Manzanese, which was forced to drop down to Eccellenza despite qualifying for the Serie D promotion play-offs in the previous season for financial reasons.

On 16 October 2021, he returned to Mestre.
