= Andrea Lisuzzo =

Italian footballer (born 1981)

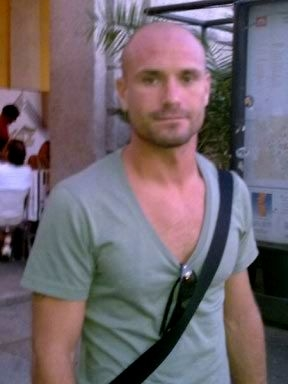

Personal information
- Date of birth: 26 January 1981 (age 45)
- Place of birth: Palermo, Italy
- Height: 1.83 m (6 ft 0 in)
- Position: Centre-back

Team information
- Current team: Ternana (head coach)

Youth career
- 1997–1998: Palermo

Senior career*
Years	Team	Apps	(Gls)
1998–2003	Palermo	16	(0)
2000	→ Foggia (loan)	5	(0)
2001–2002	→ Gela (loan)	38	(2)
2002–2003	→ Fano (loan)	23	(2)
2003–2007	Martina	110	(5)
2007–2009	Foggia	43	(0)
2009–2013	Novara	113	(5)
2013–2014	Spezia	38	(2)
2014–2018	Pisa	112	(4)

Managerial career
- 2020–2023: Empoli (U17)
- 2023–2024: Empoli (U18)
- 2024–2025: Pontedera (assistant)
- 2026–: Ternana
- * Club domestic league appearances and goals

Andrea Lisuzzo (born 26 January 1981) is an Italian football coach and a former player who is head coach of Serie D club Ternana. Lisuzzo has played over 200 matches in Serie C1/Lega Pro Prima Divisione.

== Career ==
Born in Palermo, Lisuzzo started his career at hometown club Palermo. He then played for Foggia of Serie C1, Fano, Martina and again Foggia. On 23 May 2009 he agreed a new 2-year contract with Foggia.

=== Novara ===
On 7 July 2009 he was transferred to Novara. He was a regular starter of the team, winning promotion twice, which the team would play in 2011–12 Serie A.

=== Spezia ===
On 10 July 2013 Lisuzzo joined Spezia Calcio.

=== Pisa ===
On 30 July 2014 Lisuzzo joined Pisa.

== Honours ==
- Lega Pro Prima Divisione: 2010
- Supercoppa di Lega di Prima Divisione: 2010
