= Massimiliano Varricchio =

Italian footballer

Personal information
- Date of birth: 14 November 1976 (age 49)
- Place of birth: San Giovanni in Persiceto, Italy
- Height: 1.83 m (6 ft 0 in)
- Position: Forward

Youth career
- 1994–1995: Crevalcore

Senior career*
Years	Team	Apps	(Gls)
1995–1996	Crevalcore	20	(6)
1996–1997	Centese	22	(7)
1997–1998	Virtus Castelfranco	30	(24)
1998–1999	Treviso	26	(4)
1999–2000	Cosenza	8	(0)
2000	Pisa	13	(3)
2000–2001	Castel di Sangro	29	(12)
2001–2003	Pisa	43	(17)
2003–2004	Treviso	28	(4)
2004–2005	Napoli	17	(4)
2005	Pescara	18	(4)
2005–2007	Spezia	48	(20)
2007–2010	Padova	50	(27)
2010	→ Cremonese (loan)	9	(1)
2011	Prato	10	(7)
2011–2012	Cuneo	26	(15)
2012–2013	Giacomense	32	(22)
2013–2014	SPAL	27	(20)
- * Club domestic league appearances and goals

Massimiliano Varricchio (born 14 November 1976) is an Italian former football forward.
