= ASD GC Sora =

Defunct Italian football club

Sora
- Full name: Associazione Sportiva Dilettantistica Ginnastica e Calcio Sora
- Founded: 1907
- Dissolved: 2026
- Ground: Stadio Claudio Tomei, Sora, Italy
- Capacity: 3,950
- Chairman: Giovanni Palma
- Manager: Alessio Ciardi
- League: Serie D Girone F
- 2025–26: 13th

Associazione Sportiva Dilettantistica Ginnastica e Calcio Sora was an Italian association football club, based in Sora, Lazio, that played in Serie D.

== History ==
It was founded in 1907. It has participated at the national championships several times in Serie C from the season 1933–1934 and the then in Prima Divisione 1933–1934. The last period of prolonged stay in Serie C lasted 13 years, has started the season in Serie C2 1992–93 and continued until the 2004–05 season in Serie C1.

After the company failed in 2005, a phoenix club was militating in Eccellenza Lazio.

In the 2010–11 season, by beating the Lupa Frascati, in the tie-breaker for first place of group B Eccellenza Lazio, on 22 May 2011 at the Stadio Flaminio, it guarantees the participation in the 2011–12 season in Serie D.

In the summer of 2015, Sora had a large financial deficit and did not participate in the Serie D next season, ultimately folding.

It refounded in 2016, entering Prima Categoria, gaining promotion to Promozione the following season.

In July 2026, the team didn't sign up for the next season in Serie D, thus folding again.

== Colors and badge ==
Its colours were black and white.

== Stadium ==
The club played its home matches at Stadio Claudio Tomei in Sora.

== Honours ==
- Campionato Interregionale
  - 1991–92 (Group E)
- Eccellenza
  - 2010–11 (Group B), 2022–23 (Group B)
- Promozione
  - 1952–53 (Group B), 1977–78 (Group B), 1988–89 (Group C)
- Prima Categoria
  - 1967–68 (Group B), 1987–88, 2006–07, 2016–17 (Group H)
- Seconda Divisione
  - 1932–33
