= Robson Toledo =

Brazilian footballer (born 1981)

Personal information
- Full name: Robson Toledo Machado
- Date of birth: 18 July 1981 (age 45)
- Place of birth: São Paulo, Brazil
- Height: 1.72 m (5 ft 8 in)
- Position: Left winger

Team information
- Current team: Pistoiese

Youth career
- Campinas
- 1999–2000: Perugia
- 2000–2001: Lugano

Senior career*
Years	Team	Apps	(Gls)
2001–2002	Rieti	26	(1)
2002–2004	Catanzaro	52	(5)
2004–2007	Udinese	0	(0)
2004–2005	→ Napoli (loan)	11	(1)
2005	→ Ascoli (loan)	8	(0)
2005–2006	→ Cisco Roma (loan)	33	(3)
2006–2007	→ Taranto (loan)	31	(4)
2007–2011	Ravenna	69	(6)
2008–2009	→ Pro Patria (loan)	28	(8)
2010–2011	→ Triestina (loan)	16	(0)
2011	→ Cremonese (loan)	13	(0)
2011–2012	Como	24	(3)
2012–2014	Pistoiese	49	(12)
2014	Arezzo	0	(0)
- * Club domestic league appearances and goals as of 00:34, 5 September 2014 (UTC)

Robson Toledo Machado (born 18 July 1981 in São Paulo), commonly known as Robson Toledo, is a Brazilian footballer who plays as a midfielder.

== Football career ==
Toledo started his career at Campinas in São Paulo state. He was signed by Perugia, which was at that time in the Italian Serie A. He was then sent to Lugano of Swiss Nationalliga A to continue his youth career. He then transferred to Rieti of the Italian Serie D.

He then signed by Catanzaro, where he helped the club get promoted to Serie C1 in 2003 and subsequently to Serie B in 2004.

He was spotted by Udinese, where he was eventually signed in the January transfer window, but was soon loaned back to Catanzaro of rest of 2003–04 season.

In the following seasons, he was loaned to Napoli (Serie C1), Ascoli (Serie B), Cisco Roma (Serie C2) and Taranto (Serie C1).

On 5 July 2007, Ravenna, newly arrived in Serie B, signed Toledo in joint-ownership bid. In the summer of 2008, he was loaned to Pro Patria. On 27 June 2009, Ravenna announced that the club made a higher bid in a closed tender against Udinese to buy the remaining 50% rights to the player.

On 16 August 2010, he was loaned to Serie B team Triestina with an option to purchase. In January 2011, he was exchanged with Matías Miramontes.

In August 2011 he was signed by Como.

He then played two seasons for Pistoiese. In June 2014 he was signed by Arezzo, but was excluded by direct choice of head coach Ezio Capuano later in August.
