= Raffaele Biancolino =

Italian footballer

Personal information
- Date of birth: 14 August 1977 (age 49)
- Place of birth: Naples, Italy
- Height: 1.80 m (5 ft 11 in)
- Position: Striker

Team information
- Current team: Avellino (head coach)

Senior career*
Years	Team	Apps	(Gls)
1995–1996	Giugliano	20	(1)
1996–1998	Leffe	31	(6)
1998–1999	Anagni	27	(13)
1999–2000	Renato Curi Angolana	30	(19)
2000	Ancona	3	(0)
2000–2001	Fidelis Andria	19	(4)
2001	Taranto	2	(1)
2001–2003	Chieti	46	(16)
2003–2004	Avellino	18	(7)
2004–2005	Venezia	34	(8)
2005–2007	Avellino	65	(35)
2007–2008	Messina	30	(11)
2008–2009	Juve Stabia	20	(7)
2009–2011	Cosenza	51	(20)
2011–2012	Salerno	29	(22)
2012–2014	Avellino	32	(10)

Managerial career
- 2019–2020: Carotenuto
- 2020: Città di Avellino
- 2022: Avellino (caretaker)
- 2024–2026: Avellino
- * Club domestic league appearances and goals

Raffaele Biancolino (born 14 August 1977) is a former Italian footballer who played as a striker. He was most recently the head coach of Serie B club Avellino.

== Playing career ==
Born in Naples, Biancolino played for lower-league clubs well into his 20s. He only appeared for a Serie B side in the 2000–01 season, playing only three months for Ancona.

After returning to Serie C1, Biancolino joined Avellino in January 2003 and helped the side return to the second level. However, after being sparingly used at the start of the 2003–04 season, he moved to fellow second-divisioner Venezia in January 2004. Biancolino remained in the second and third levels in the following seasons, representing former side Avellino, Messina (being his side's top scorer in his only season at the club), Juve Stabia and Cosenza.

In July 2012, 34-year-old Biancolino joined Serie D side Salerno Calcio. After a sole season with the side (also being topscorer), he moved to Avellino, after refusing to play for Salernitana.

== Coaching career ==
In March 2018, Biancolino joined Avellino's youth coaching staff as an assistant.

In September 2019, he was named new head coach of Promozione amateurs Carotenuto. He then served as head coach of Eccellenza amateurs Città di Avellino from April to May 2021.

In August 2021, Biancolino returned to Avellino as the assistant coach of Tonino Iandolo in charge of the Primavera Under-19 team. In July 2022 he was promoted in charge of the Under-19 team.

On 17 October 2022, Biancolino was named caretaker coach of Avellino, following the dismissal of head coach Roberto Taurino. He was in charge of the team for a single league game, a 0–2 loss to Viterbese, before being replaced by new permanent boss Massimo Rastelli.

On 22 September 2024, following the dismissal of Michele Pazienza after a negative start to the new season, Biancolino was once again instated as caretaker head coach of Avellino. After a string of positive results, on 5 October 2024 Avellino confirmed Biancolino would stay on as the permanent head coach of the first team. He eventually guided Avellino to win the Group C title and, subsequently, ensuring automatic promotion to Serie B for the following season.

== Honours ==
=== Manager ===
Avellino

- Serie C: 2024–25 (Group C)
