= Lino Marzorati =

Italian footballer

Personal information
- Date of birth: 12 October 1986 (age 40)
- Place of birth: Rho, Italy
- Height: 1.81 m (5 ft 11 in)
- Positions: Centre-back; right-back

Youth career
- AC Milan

Senior career*
Years	Team	Apps	(Gls)
2004–2006	AC Milan	1	(0)
2006–2011	Empoli	107	(3)
2009–2010	→ Cagliari	13	(0)
2011–2014	Sassuolo	62	(1)
2014–2016	Modena	42	(0)
2017–2018	Prato	34	(2)
2018–2019	Juve Stabia	39	(1)
2019–2020	Cavese	20	(0)
2020–2022	Lecco	44	(1)

International career^{‡}
2002	Italy U16	3	(0)
2002–2003	Italy U17	15	(0)
2005	Italy U19	11	(0)
2005–2006	Italy U20	7	(0)
2006–2009	Italy U21	15	(0)
2008	Italy Olympic	2	(0)
- * Club domestic league appearances and goals as of 24 April 2022 ‡ National team caps and goals as of 9 June 2009

Lino Marzorati (born 12 October 1986) is an Italian footballer who plays as a defender. For most of his career Marzorati's last name had been spelled with two t's, but in early 2007 he announced it was an error and his name is spelled only with one t. However his last name is still officially registered as Marzoratti.

== Club career ==
Defined a bright prospect by A.C. Milan coach Carlo Ancelotti, Marzorati, who played for the team's youth academy, was called to join the first team squad during the 2004–05 season. He was sold to Empoli in a co-ownership deal for €750,000 after a successful loan in 2007 (along with Nicola Pozzi, Luca Antonini and Ignazio Abate) and later Empoli fully contracted with the player for €1.5 million (however, along with Pozzi (€3.25M), fully counter-weight by the return of Antonini (€2.75M) and Abate (€2M). In summer 2009 he joined Cagliari Calcio in another co-ownership deal, for €1 million. In June 2010 he was bought back by Empoli for just €300,000.

In summer 2011 he was sold to fellow Serie B club Sassuolo for just €200,000 in co-ownership deal on a three-year deal. He was signed outright for another €200,000 circa January 2012.

On 28 January 2014, Marzorati left Serie A side Sassuolo for Serie B side Modena, signing a 2 1/2-year deal.

On 10 July 2019, he signed a two-year contract with Cavese. On 7 September 2020, he transferred to Lecco.

== International career ==
Marzorati represented Italy U-20 in the FIFA World Youth Championship 2005. On 12 December 2006, he made his International under-21 debut against Luxembourg.

== Career statistics ==
=== Club ===
As of match played 19 September 2021

Appearances and goals by club, season and competition
Club	Season	League			National Cup		Continental		Other		Total	
Club	Season	Division	Apps	Goals	Apps	Goals	Apps	Goals	Apps	Goals	Apps	Goals
AC Milan	2004–05	Serie A	1	0	0	0	—		—		1	0
AC Milan	2005–06	Serie A	0	0	2	0	—		—		2	0
AC Milan	Total		1	0	2	0	0	0	0	0	3	0
Empoli	2006–07	Serie A	26	1	4	0	—		—		30	1
Empoli	2007–08	Serie A	32	1	1	0	2	0	—		35	1
Empoli	2008–09	Serie B	27	0	1	0	—		—		28	0
Empoli	2010–11	Serie B	23	0	1	0	—		—		24	0
Empoli	Total		108	2	7	0	2	0	0	0	117	2
Cagliari (loan)	2009–10	Serie A	13	0	1	0	—		—		14	0
Sassuolo	2011–12	Serie B	34	0	0	0	—		2 (Note: Appearance(s) in Promotion Playoffs)	0	36	0
Sassuolo	2012–13	Serie B	19	0	0	0	—		—		19	0
Sassuolo	2013–14	Serie A	9	1	0	0	—		—		9	1
Sassuolo	Total		62	1	0	0	0	0	2	0	64	1
Modena	2013–14	Serie B	16	0	0	0	—		—		16	0
Modena	2014–15	Serie B	24	0	2	0	—		2 (Note: Appearance(s) in Relegation Playoffs)	0	28	0
Modena	2015–16	Serie B	34	1	2	0	—		—		36	1
Modena	Total		74	1	4	0	0	0	2	0	80	1
Prato	2016–17	Lega Pro	15	2	0	0	—		2	0	17	2
Prato	2017–18	Serie C	17	0	0	0	—		3 (Note: Appearance(s) in Coppa Italia Serie C)	1	20	1
Prato	Total		32	2	0	0	0	0	5	0	37	3
Juve Stabia	2017–18	Serie C	10	1	0	0	—		1	0	11	1
Juve Stabia	2018–19	Serie C	26	0	2	0	—		2 (Note: Appearance(s) in Supercoppa di Serie C)	0	30	0
Juve Stabia	Total		36	1	2	0	0	0	3	0	41	1
Cavese	2019–20	Serie C	20	0	1	0	—		—		21	0
Lecco	2020–21	Serie C	21	1	0	0	—		—		21	1
Lecco	2021–22	Serie C	3	0	0	0	—		1	0	4	0
Lecco	Total		24	1	0	0	0	0	1	0	25	1
Career total			370	8	17	0	2	0	14	0	403	8

== Honours ==
Sasssuolo

- Serie B: 2012–13
