= Riccardo Corallo =

Italian footballer

Personal information
- Full name: Riccardo Corallo
- Date of birth: 31 March 1980 (age 46)
- Place of birth: Rivoli, Italy
- Height: 1.87 m (6 ft 2 in)
- Position: Defender

Youth career
- 1990–1998: Torino

Senior career*
Years	Team	Apps	(Gls)
1998	Varese	1	(0)
1999	Lazio	0	(0)
1999–2000	Reggiana	15	(1)
2000–2002	Avellino	34	(0)
2002–2003	Messina	0	(0)
2003	Reggiana	1	(0)
2003	SPAL	13	(2)
2003–2005	Ascoli	23	(0)
2005	Cremonese	8	(0)
2005–2007	Ascoli	12	(0)
2007–2009	Avellino	25	(1)
2009–2010	Pro Vercelli	19	(0)
2011	Gloria Bistriţa	11	(0)
2011	Viterbese Castrense	2	(0)
2012	Montichiari	10	(0)
2012–2013	Bogliasco D'Albertis	7	(0)
Total		181	(4)
- * Club domestic league appearances and goals as of 24 September 2019

Riccardo Corallo is a retired Italian footballer. He played as a defender.
