= Gastone Bottini =

Italian footballer

Personal information
- Date of birth: 24 February 1987 (age 39)
- Place of birth: Varese, Italy
- Position: Midfielder

Youth career
- Milan

Senior career*
Years	Team	Apps	(Gls)
2006–2007	Milan	0	(0)
2007–2008	Lecco	20	(0)
2008–2009	Montichiari	14	(0)
2009–2011	Valenzana	19	(0)
2011–2012	Inveruno	10	(1)
2012	Gallaratese	10	(0)
2012–	Verbano	12	(0)
- * Club domestic league appearances and goals as of 14 March 2010

Gastone Bottini (born 24 February 1987) is a former Italian professional footballer.

== Club career ==
On November 28, 2006 Bottini made his first-team debut for A.C. Milan in a Coppa Italia game against Brescia, replacing Marco Borriello in the final minutes.

In 2009, he left for Valenzana.

He retired from professional football in 2024, at age 37.
