= Matteo Lunati =

Italian footballer

Personal information
- Full name: Matteo Lunati
- Date of birth: 2 July 1987 (age 39)
- Place of birth: Ferrara, Italy
- Height: 1.82 m (6 ft 0 in)
- Position: Midfielder

Team information
- Current team: Calcio Portogruaro Summaga

Youth career
- Spal
- 2006–2008: Milan

Senior career*
Years	Team	Apps	(Gls)
2005–2006	Spal	29	(0)
2006–2009	Milan	0	(0)
2008	→ San Marino (loan)	6	(0)
2008–2009	→ Como (loan)	2	(0)
2010–2011	Real Rimini	0	(0)
2011–2012	Calcio Portogruaro Summaga	30	(2)
Total		37	(0)
- * Club domestic league appearances and goals as of 9 August 2010

Matteo Lunati (born 2 July 1987) is an Italian footballer who plays as a midfielder for club Calcio Portogruaro Summaga.

== Club career ==
After spending his youth years with Spal and Milan, Lunati made his first-team debut for the Rossoneri in a Coppa Italia game against Brescia on 8 November 2006. Milan, however, loaned him out for the 2008–09 season to San Marino and Como.

In August 2010, Lunati signed for Serie D side Real Rimini.
