= Gennaro Scarlato =

Italian footballer and manager

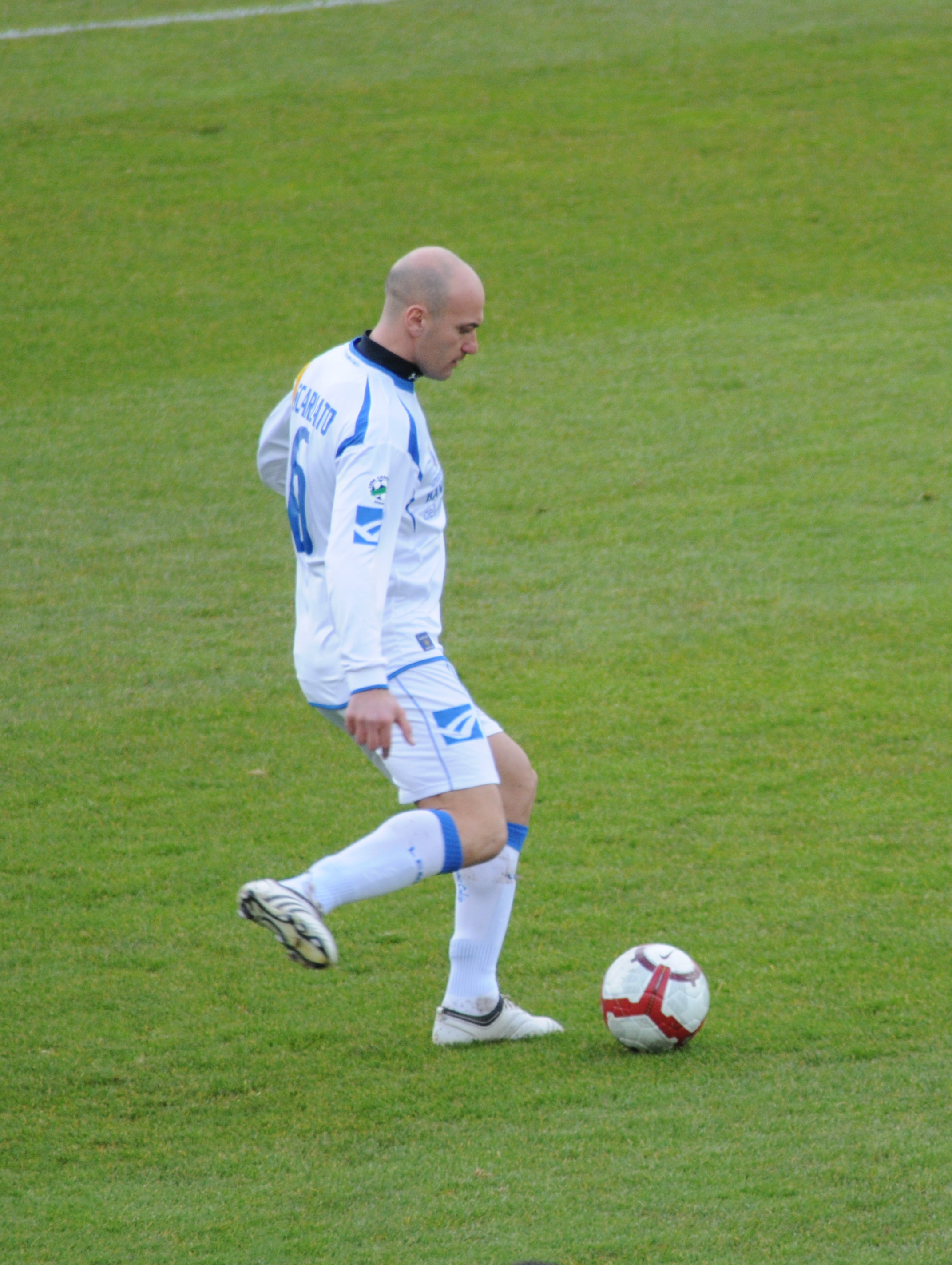

Personal information
- Full name: 2010,
- Date of birth: 3 May 1977 (age 49)
- Place of birth: Naples, Italy
- Height: 1.82 m (6 ft 0 in)
- Position: Defender

Senior career*
Years	Team	Apps	(Gls)
1996–2000	Napoli	43	(1)
1999	→ Vicenza (loan)	11	(0)
2000	Torino	5	(0)
2000–2001	Ravenna	21	(1)
2001–2002	Udinese	17	(1)
2002–2004	Ternana	65	(1)
2004–2005	Napoli	28	(2)
2005–2006	Crotone	27	(1)
2006–2007	Spezia	37	(3)
2007–2011	Frosinone	81	(7)
2011	Cosenza	1	(0)
2012	Ischia	16	(0)
Total		352	(17)

International career
1994	Italy U-18	5	(1)
1995	Italy U-18	2	(0)
1998	Italy U-21	1	(0)
1999	Italy U-21	4	(1)
2000	Italy U-21	1	(0)

Managerial career
- 2012: Marino
- * Club domestic league appearances and goals

Gennaro Scarlato (born 3 May 1977 in Naples) is an Italian association football manager and former player who played as a defender.

== Playing career ==
=== International ===
He was in the provisional squad of Italian U-21 team in 2000 UEFA U-21 Championship and 2000 Olympics, but never made any appearance.

== Coaching career ==
On 19 September 2012, he became the new coach of Marino (head coach) in the Serie D, in place of Nunzio Iardino who had resigned. On 30 October 2012, he was sacked.
