= Luigi Lavecchia =

Italian footballer and manager

Personal information
- Date of birth: 25 August 1981 (age 45)
- Place of birth: Turin, Italy
- Height: 1.77 m (5 ft 10 in)
- Position: Defender

Youth career
- 1995–2000: Juventus

Senior career*
Years	Team	Apps	(Gls)
2000–2002	Juventus	0	(0)
2000	→ Crotone (loan)	0	(0)
2000–2001	→ Brescello (loan)	13	(0)
2001–2002	→ Torres (loan)	32	(3)
2002–2003	Ascoli	27	(0)
2003–2007	Messina	70	(2)
2004–2005	→ Arezzo (loan)	26	(0)
2005–2006	→ Le Mans (loan)	1	(0)
2007–2010	Bologna	28	(0)
2011	FCM Târgu Mureş	1	(0)
2011–2013	Torres	0	(0)
2013–2015	Fertilia		
Total		198	(5)

International career
1997	Italy U16	1	(0)
2000	Italy U18	4	(0)
2000–2002	Italy U20	8	(1)
2002–2003	Italy U21	3	(0)

Managerial career
- 2014–2015: Fertilia
- * Club domestic league appearances and goals

Luigi Lavecchia (born 25 August 1981) is an Italian former footballer who played for as a defender. He is a current manager.

== Career ==
Lavecchia was born in Turin and started out as a youth player with home-town club Juventus. He had then spells in Serie B with five different clubs: Crotone, Ascoli, Messina, Arezzo, Bologna and in Ligue 1 with Le Mans.

=== Bologna ===
In the summer of 2007, Luigi Lavecchia signed with the Serie B team Bologna with whom he promoted to Serie A.

=== Romania ===
In February 2011, he signed with the Romanian club FCM Târgu Mureş to play in Liga 1.
