= Salvatore Accursi =

Italian football Defender

Personal information
- Date of birth: 3 February 1978 (age 48)
- Place of birth: Locri, Italy
- Height: 1.86 m (6 ft 1 in)
- Position: Defender

Team information
- Current team: Catanzaro (assistant)

Senior career*
Years	Team	Apps	(Gls)
1995–1998	Locri	77	(2)
1998–2000	Messina	50	(0)
2000–2001	Cagliari	0	(0)
2001	Brescello	16	(0)
2001–2003	Messina	27	(1)
2003	Martina	8	(0)
2003–2004	Messina	20	(0)
2004–2005	Napoli	8	(0)
2005–2010	Perugia	95	(1)
2010–2011	Salernitana	21	(0)
2011–2012	Catanzaro	18	(2)

Managerial career
- 2015–2016: Catanzaro (assistant)
- 2020–2021: Perugia (assistant)
- 2021–2022: Benevento (assistant)
- 2023–2024: Cosenza (assistant)
- 2024–: Catanzaro (assistant)
- * Club domestic league appearances and goals

Salvatore Accursi (born 3 February 1978) is an Italian football coach and a former defender. He is the assistant manager of Catanzaro.

== Caps on Italian Series ==
Serie B : 47 apps, 1 goal

Serie C1 : 126 apps, 1 goal

Serie C2 : 50 apps

Serie D : 66 apps, 1 goal

Eccellenza : 11 apps, 1 goal

Total : 300 apps, 4 goal
