= Nicola Pozzi =

Italian footballer

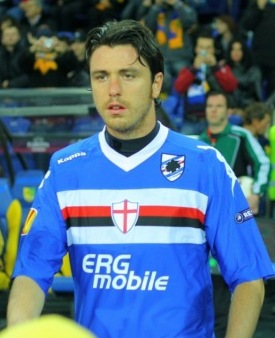
- Pozzi with Sampdoria in 2010

Personal information
- Date of birth: 30 June 1986 (age 40)
- Place of birth: Santarcangelo di Romagna, Italy
- Height: 1.82 m (6 ft 0 in)
- Position: Striker

Team information
- Current team: Sampdoria (technical collaborator)

Senior career*
Years	Team	Apps	(Gls)
2002–2004	Cesena	19	(4)
2004–2005	Milan	0	(0)
2004	→ Napoli (loan)	3	(1)
2005	→ Pescara (loan)	4	(0)
2005–2009	Empoli	103	(26)
2009–2014	Sampdoria	92	(31)
2013	→ Siena (loan)	3	(0)
2014–2015	Parma	3	(0)
2015	→ Chievo (loan)	0	(0)
2015–2016	Vicenza	4	(0)
2016–2017	Pro Piacenza	7	(2)
2017–2019	San Donato Tavarnelle	39	(6)

International career
2006–2009	Italy U-21	8	(1)

Managerial career
- 2021–2022: Grassina
- * Club domestic league appearances and goals as of 9 June 2015

Nicola Pozzi (born 30 June 1986) is an Italian football coach and former striker, currently in charge as a technical collaborator at Serie B club Sampdoria.

== Playing career ==
=== Milan ===
Signed by AC Milan from then-Serie C1 side Cesena in January 2004, he was successively loaned to Napoli and Pescara, before being sent on loan to Empoli for two consecutive seasons (2005–06 and 2006–07).

=== Empoli ===
In 2007–08 season, his status was changed to co-owned by both sides, for €750,000 (that season Empoli also signed Luca Antonini (€1 million), Lino Marzoratti (€750,000) and Ignazio Abate (€900,000) in co-ownership deals), and on 16 June 2008 Empoli got full ownership for €3.25 million (Pozzi) and €1.5 million (Marzoratti ) in exchange of Antonini (€2.75 million) and Abate (€2 million) who returned to AC Milan, effectively made Empoli pay €3.4 million in net for Pozzi and Marzoratti, as well as the special loan of Abate and Antonini.

On 9 December 2007, he scored all four goals in Empoli's 4–1 victory over Cagliari. However, he suffered a season-ending knee injury after netting a brace in a 3–1 defeat of Napoli on February 17, and was sidelined for six months, effectively ruling him out of the Azzurrini squad for the 2008 Olympics.

Pozzi also represented Italy at the Under-21 level.

=== Sampdoria ===
On 31 August 2009, Sampdoria announced via their website the loan signing of Pozzi for €180,000 with the option to make the signing permanent. In June 2010, Sampdoria decided to sign him outright, for €5.2 million on a five-year contract.

=== Parma ===
After playing five seasons well at Sampdoria, Pozzi moved to Serie A side Parma on 31 January 2014, with Stefano Okaka moving in the opposite direction, signing a three-and-a-half year deal. The deal was a cashless swap, as both Pozzi and Okaka were valued for €2 million.

On 2 February 2015, Pozzi joined Chievo in a temporary deal.

=== Vicenza ===
On 31 August 2015, he was signed by Vicenza in a two-year deal. He took the number 9 shirt from Stefano Pettinari.

However, on 25 August 2016, he was released.

== Coaching career ==
On 26 June 2021, Pozzi took on his first head coaching role, being appointed at the helm of Tuscan Eccellenza amateur club Grassina. He left the club in June 2022, after suffering relegation to Promozione.

On 19 October 2025, he was unveiled as Angelo Gregucci's new technical collaborator at Serie B club Sampdoria.
