= 2009–10 UC Sampdoria season =

Sampdoria
2009–10 season
- Chairman: Riccardo Garrone
- Manager: Luigi Delneri
- Stadium: Stadio Luigi Ferraris
- Serie A: 4th
- Coppa Italia: Fourth round
- Top goalscorer: League: Giampaolo Pazzini (19); All: Giampaolo Pazzini (21)
Home colours	Away colours	Third colours

2009–10 Serie A is the 62nd Serie A season in Unione Calcio Sampdoria's history. Sampdoria also participated in 2009–10 Coppa Italia, starting from the 3rd round. Sampdoria finished the 2008–09 Serie A season in 13th place, so they failed to qualify for any of the European competitions for the 2009–10 season. On 16 May 2010, Sampdoria finished their great season with a 1–0 win against S.S.C. Napoli, securing 4th place in 2009–10 Serie A and the final 2010–11 UEFA Champions League qualification spot.

== First-team squad ==
Squad at end of season

Note: Flags indicate national team as defined under FIFA eligibility rules; some limited exceptions apply. Players may hold more than one non-FIFA nationality.

No.	Pos.	Nation	Player
1	GK	(Italy) ITA	Luca Castellazzi
2	DF	(Italy) ITA	Fabio Lamorte
3	DF	(Switzerland) SUI	Reto Ziegler
5	DF	(Italy) ITA	Pietro Accardi
6	DF	(Italy) ITA	Stefano Lucchini
7	MF	(Italy) ITA	Daniele Mannini
8	DF	(Italy) ITA	Luciano Zauri (on loan from Lazio)
9	FW	(Italy) ITA	Nicola Pozzi (on loan from Empoli)
10	FW	(Italy) ITA	Giampaolo Pazzini
11	FW	(Serbia) SRB	Stefan Šćepović (on loan from OFK Beograd)
12	MF	(Argentina) ARG	Fernando Tissone
13	DF	(Italy) ITA	Marco Rossi (on loan from Parma)
14	MF	(Austria) AUT	Dieter Elsneg (on loan from Frosinone)
15	DF	(Italy) ITA	Vasco Regini
16	MF	(Italy) ITA	Andrea Poli

No.	Pos.	Nation	Player
17	MF	(Italy) ITA	Angelo Palombo
18	MF	(Italy) ITA	Stefano Guberti (on loan from Roma)
19	MF	(Italy) ITA	Daniele Franceschini
20	MF	(Switzerland) SUI	Marco Padalino
21	GK	(Italy) ITA	Matteo Guardalben
22	DF	(Italy) ITA	Fabrizio Cacciatore
23	GK	(Italy) ITA	Mario Cassano (on loan from Piacenza)
27	GK	(Italy) ITA	Marco Costantino (on loan from SPAL)
28	DF	(Italy) ITA	Daniele Gastaldello
30	GK	(Italy) ITA	Marco Storari (on loan from Milan)
77	MF	(Italy) ITA	Franco Semioli
90	FW	(Italy) ITA	Emanuele Testardi (on loan from Pescara)
91	MF	(Italy) ITA	Roberto Soriano
92	DF	(Italy) ITA	Daniele Messina
99	FW	(Italy) ITA	Antonio Cassano

=== Left club during season ===
Note: Flags indicate national team as defined under FIFA eligibility rules; some limited exceptions apply. Players may hold more than one non-FIFA nationality.

No.	Pos.	Nation	Player
11	FW	(Italy) ITA	Claudio Bellucci (on loan to Livorno)
23	DF	(Lithuania) LTU	Marius Stankevičius (on loan to Sevilla)
30	MF	(Italy) ITA	Paolo Sammarco (on loan to Udinese)
34	MF	(Italy) ITA	Daniele Dessena (on loan to Cagliari)

No.	Pos.	Nation	Player
88	FW	(Italy) ITA	Salvatore Foti (on loan to Piacenza)
89	FW	(Italy) ITA	Guido Marilungo (on loan to Lecce)
90	GK	(Italy) ITA	Vincenzo Fiorillo (on loan to Reggina)

== List of transfers in 2009–10 ==
Players in

Player	From	Type	Tr. Window
Gianluigi Bianco	Empoli	Co-ownership resolution	Summer
Matteo Guardalben	Treviso	Transfer	Summer
Fernando Tissone	Udinese	Transfer	Summer
Salvatore Foti	Treviso	Transfer	Summer
Daniele Mannini	Napoli	Transfer	Summer
Franco Semioli	Fiorentina	Transfer	Summer
Nicola Pozzi	Empoli	Loan	Summer
Marco Rossi	Parma	Loan	Summer
Luciano Zauri	Lazio	Loan	Summer
Mario Cassano	Piacenza	Loan	Winter
Marco Storari	Milan	Loan	Winter
Stefano Guberti	Roma	Loan	Winter
Stefan Šćepović	OFK Belgrade	Loan	Winter

Players out

Player	To	Transfer Window
Jonathan Rossini	Udinese	Summer
Mirko Eramo	Monza	Summer
Massimo Bonanni	Pescara	Summer
Emiliano Bonazzoli	Reggina	Summer
Hugo Campagnaro	Napoli	Summer
Leonardo Miglionico	Livorno	Summer
Gennaro Delvecchio	Catania	Summer
Mirko Pieri	Livorno	Summer
Michele Ferri	Vicenza	Summer
Stefano Scappini	Ravenna	Summer
Gianluigi Bianco	Sassuolo	Summer (Loan)
Solomon Enow	Spezia	Summer (co-ownership)
Luca Calzolaio	Spezia	Summer (co-ownership)
Marius Stankevičius	Sevilla	Winter(Loan)

== Competitions ==
=== Serie A ===
==== League table ====
Pos	Team	Pld	W	D	L	GF	GA	GD	Pts	Qualification or relegation
2	Roma	38	24	8	6	68	41	+27	80	Qualification to Champions League group stage
3	Milan	38	20	10	8	60	39	+21	70	Qualification to Champions League group stage
4	Sampdoria	38	19	10	9	49	41	+8	67	Qualification to Champions League play-off round
5	Palermo	38	18	11	9	59	47	+12	65	Qualification to Europa League play-off round
6	Napoli	38	15	14	9	50	43	+7	59	Qualification to Europa League play-off round

Source: Lega Calcio and Yahoo! Sport
Rules for classification: 1) points; 2) head-to-head points; 3) head-to-head goal difference; 4) head-to-head goals scored; 5) goal difference; 6) number of goals scored.

==== Results summary ====
Overall								Home						Away					
Pld	W	D	L	GF	GA	GD	Pts	W	D	L	GF	GA	GD	W	D	L	GF	GA	GD
38	19	10	9	49	41	+8	67	13	6	0	31	10	+21	6	4	9	18	31	−13

Last updated: 16 May 2010.
Source: Competitive matches

==== Results by round ====
Round	1	2	3	4	5	6	7	8	9	10	11	12	13	14	15	16	17	18	19	20	21	22	23	24	25	26	27	28	29	30	31	32	33	34	35	36	37	38
Ground	A	H	A	H	A	H	H	A	H	A	H	A	H	A	A	H	A	H	A	H	A	H	A	H	A	A	H	A	H	A	H	A	H	H	A	H	A	H
Result	W	W	W	W	L	W	D	D	W	L	D	L	W	L	L	D	L	D	L	D	W	W	W	W	D	L	W	D	W	L	D	W	W	W	W	W	D	W
Position	4	1	3	1	3	1	2	2	2	3	3	5	4	4	8	6	10	10	12	13	10	7	6	5	7	7	6	6	5	5	7	5	5	4	4	4	4	4

Updated to match(es) played on 16 May 2010. Source: Competitive matches
A = Away; H = Home; W = Win; D = Draw; L = Loss

==== Matches ====
23 August 2009 1	Catania	1–2	Sampdoria	Catania
20:45 CEST	Morimoto 38'		Pazzini 9'; Gastaldello 90+3'	Stadium: Stadio Angelo Massimino; Attendance: 14,325; Referee: Luca Banti

30 August 2009 2	Sampdoria	3–1	Udinese	Genoa
20:45 CEST	Pazzini 11'; Mannini 45+1'; Cassano 83'		Di Natale 56'	Stadium: Stadio Luigi Ferraris; Attendance: 22,995; Referee: Matteo Trefoloni

13 September 2009 3	Atalanta	0–1	Sampdoria	Bergamo
15:00 CEST			Mannini 63'	Stadium: Stadio Atleti Azzurri d'Italia; Attendance: 13,461; Referee: Gabriele Gava

20 September 2009 4	Sampdoria	4–1	Siena	Genoa
15:00 CEST	Palombo 23'; Mannini 31'; Padalino 48', 85'		Fini 68'	Stadium: Stadio Luigi Ferraris; Attendance: 22,859; Referee: Carmine Russo

23 September 2009 5	Fiorentina	2–0	Sampdoria	Florence
20:45 CEST	Jovetić 25'; Gilardino 66'			Stadium: Stadio Artemio Franchi; Attendance: 26,307; Referee: Emidio Morganti

26 September 2009 6	Sampdoria	1–0	Internazionale	Genoa
18:00 CEST	Pazzini 72'			Stadium: Stadio Luigi Ferraris; Attendance: 30,629; Referee: Nicola Rizzoli

4 October 2009 7	Sampdoria	1–1	Parma	Genoa
15:00 CEST	Pazzini 23'		Galloppa 30'	Stadium: Stadio Luigi Ferraris; Attendance: 24,312; Referee: Paolo Mazzoleni

18 October 2009 8	Lazio	1–1	Sampdoria	Rome
15:00 CEST	Matuzalém 42'		Pazzini 40'	Stadium: Stadio Olimpico; Attendance: 33,103; Referee: Daniele Orsato

24 October 2009 9	Sampdoria	4–1	Bologna	Genoa
18:00 CEST	Pazzini 8'; Mannini 17', 33'; Ziegler 26'		Osvaldo 62'	Stadium: Stadio Luigi Ferraris; Attendance: 23,379; Referee: Massimiliano Saccani

28 October 2009 10	Juventus	5–1	Sampdoria	Turin
20:45 CET	Amauri 26', 62'; Chiellini 42'; Camoranesi 50'; Trezeguet 88'		Pazzini 63'	Stadium: Stadio Olimpico di Torino; Attendance: 25,273; Referee: Gianluca Rocchi

1 November 2009 11	Sampdoria	0–0	Bari	Genoa
15:00 CET				Stadium: Stadio Luigi Ferraris; Attendance: 26,179; Referee: Paolo Valeri

8 November 2009 12	Cagliari	2–0	Sampdoria	Cagliari
15:00 CET	Conti 85'; Matri 89'			Stadium: Stadio Sant'Elia; Attendance: 12,000; Referee: Andrea Gervasoni

22 November 2009 13	Sampdoria	2–1	Chievo	Genoa
15:00 CET	M. Rossi 19'; Pazzini 65'		Mantovani 80'	Stadium: Stadio Luigi Ferraris; Attendance: 21,957; Referee: Carmine Russo

28 November 2009 14	Genoa	3–0	Sampdoria	Genoa
20:45 CET	Milanetto 10' (pen.); Rossi 53'; Palladino 75' (pen.)			Stadium: Stadio Luigi Ferraris; Attendance: 33,265; Referee: Roberto Rosetti

5 December 2009 15	Milan	3–0	Sampdoria	Milan
18:00 CET	Borriello 1'; Seedorf 20'; Pato 23'			Stadium: San Siro; Attendance: 42,824; Referee: Gianluca Rocchi

13 December 2009 16	Sampdoria	0–0	Roma	Genoa
20:45 CET				Stadium: Stadio Luigi Ferraris; Attendance: 24,073; Referee: Antonio Damato

20 December 2009 17	Livorno	3–1	Sampdoria	Livorno
15:00 CET	Rivas 39'; Danilevicius 47', 90+3'		Cassano 15'	Stadium: Stadio Armando Picchi; Attendance: 9,371; Referee: Domenico Celi

6 January 2010 18	Sampdoria	1–1	Palermo	Genoa
15:00 CET	Cassano 41'		Cavani 40'	Stadium: Stadio Luigi Ferraris; Attendance: 21,539; Referee: Andrea Romeo

10 January 2010 19	Napoli	1–0	Sampdoria	Naples
15:00 CET	Denis 71'			Stadium: Stadio San Paolo; Attendance: 40,962; Referee: Nicola Rizzoli

17 January 2010 20	Sampdoria	1–1	Catania	Genoa
15:00 CET	Pazzini 45' (pen.)		Llama 14'	Stadium: Stadio Luigi Ferraris; Attendance: 20,405; Referee: Emidio Morganti

24 January 2010 21	Udinese	2–3	Sampdoria	Udine
15:00 CET	Di Natale 7' (pen.); Isla 44'		Pazzini 27' (pen.); Pozzi 57'; Semioli 66'	Stadium: Stadio Friuli; Attendance: 16,167; Referee: Carmine Russo

31 January 2010 22	Sampdoria	2–0	Atalanta	Genoa
15:00 CET	Palombo 36'; Pazzini 45+1'			Stadium: Stadio Luigi Ferraris; Attendance: 22,408; Referee: Domenico Celi

7 February 2010 23	Siena	1–2	Sampdoria	Siena
15:00 CET	Maccarone 82'		Gastaldello 3'; Pozzi 77'	Stadium: Stadio Artemio Franchi; Attendance: 10,853; Referee: Renzo Candussio

13 February 2010 24	Sampdoria	2–0	Fiorentina	Genoa
20:45 CET	Semioli 16'; Pazzini 40'			Stadium: Stadio Luigi Ferraris; Attendance: 23,485; Referee: Emidio Morganti

20 February 2010 25	Internazionale	0–0	Sampdoria	Milan
20:45 CET				Stadium: San Siro; Attendance: 53,806; Referee: Paolo Tagliavento

28 February 2010 26	Parma	1–0	Sampdoria	Parma
15:00 CET	Zaccardo 54'			Stadium: Stadio Ennio Tardini; Attendance: 18,789; Referee: Gianluca Rocchi

7 March 2010 27	Sampdoria	2–1	Lazio	Genoa
15:00 CET	Guberti 29'; Pazzini 36'		Floccari 7'	Stadium: Stadio Luigi Ferraris; Attendance: 23,919; Referee: Christian Brighi

14 March 2010 28	Bologna	1–1	Sampdoria	Bologna
15:00 CET	Raggi 90+2'		Gastaldello 86'	Stadium: Stadio Renato Dall'Ara; Attendance: 18,573; Referee: Sebastiano Peruzzo

21 March 2010 29	Sampdoria	1–0	Juventus	Genoa
20:45 CET	Cassano 76'			Stadium: Stadio Luigi Ferraris; Attendance: 27,398; Referee: Paolo Tagliavento

24 March 2010 30	Bari	2–1	Sampdoria	Bari
20:45 CET	Meggiorini 58'; P. Barreto 86'		Cassano 19'	Stadium: Stadio San Nicola; Attendance: 28,368; Referee: Carmine Russo

28 March 2010 31	Sampdoria	1–1	Cagliari	Genoa
15:00 CEST	Guberti 48'		Nenê 81'	Stadium: Stadio Luigi Ferraris; Attendance: 22,633; Referee: Luca Banti

3 April 2010 32	Chievo	1–2	Sampdoria	Verona
15:00 CEST	Mantovani 76'		Cassano 1'; Pazzini 55'	Stadium: Stadio Marcantonio Bentegodi; Attendance: 10,087; Referee: Gabriele Gava

11 April 2010 33	Sampdoria	1–0	Genoa	Genoa
20:45 CEST	Cassano 23'			Stadium: Stadio Luigi Ferraris; Attendance: 34,494; Referee: Paolo Tagliavento

18 April 2010 34	Sampdoria	2–1	Milan	Genoa
15:00 CEST	Cassano 54' (pen.); Pazzini 90+2'		Borriello 20'	Stadium: Stadio Luigi Ferraris; Attendance: 28,764; Referee: Nicola Rizzoli

25 April 2010 35	Roma	1–2	Sampdoria	Rome
20:45 CEST	Totti 14'		Pazzini 52', 85'	Stadium: Stadio Olimpico; Attendance: 56,379; Referee: Antonio Damato

2 May 2010 36	Sampdoria	2–0	Livorno	Genoa
15:00 CEST	Cassano 5'; Ziegler 84'			Stadium: Stadio Luigi Ferraris; Attendance: 25,076; Referee: Matteo Trefoloni

9 May 2010 37	Palermo	1–1	Sampdoria	Palermo
15:00 CEST	Miccoli 68' (pen.)		Pazzini 54' (pen.)	Stadium: Stadio Renzo Barbera; Attendance: 35,872; Referee: Roberto Rosetti

16 May 2010 38	Sampdoria	1–0	Napoli	Genoa
15:00 CEST	Pazzini 51'			Stadium: Stadio Luigi Ferraris; Attendance: 30,883; Referee: Nicola Rizzoli

=== Coppa Italia ===
16 August 2009 Third round	Sampdoria	6–2	Lecce	Genoa
20:30 CEST	Pazzini 8', 33'; Cassano 32', 59'; Palombo 76' (pen.); Padalino 90'		Defendi 73'; Lucchini 81' (o.g.)	Stadium: Stadio Luigi Ferraris; Attendance: 10,240; Referee: Roberto Rosetti

1 December 2009 Fourth round	Sampdoria	1–2	Livorno	Genoa
20:30 CET	Mannini 46'		Lucchini 76' (o.g.); Danilevičius 86'	Stadium: Stadio Luigi Ferraris; Attendance: 4,212; Referee: Nicola Stefanini

== Squad statistics ==
Last update 17 May 2010'

No.	Position	Player	Total Apps(40)	Total GS	Total	Serie A Apps(38)	Serie A GS	Serie A	Cop. It. Apps(2)	Cop. It. GS	Cop. It.
1	GK	Luca Castellazzi	20	20	28*	19	19	26*	1	1	2*
21	GK	Matteo Guardalben	0	0	0	0	0	0	0	0	0
23	GK	Mario Cassano	0	0	0	0	0	0	0	0	0
30	GK	Marco Storari	19	19	14*	19	19	14*	0	0	0
90	GK	Vincenzo Fiorillo	2	1	3*	1	0	1*	1	1	2*
5	DF	Pietro Accardi	15	6	0	14	5	0	1	1	0
6	DF	Stefano Lucchini	28	27	0	26	25	0	2	2	0
13	DF	Marco Rossi	22	18	1	20	17	1	2	1	0
15	DF	Vasco Regini	0	0	0	0	0	0	0	0	0
22	DF	Fabrizio Cacciatore	11	6	0	10	5	0	1	1	0
23	DF	Marius Stankevičius	16	15	0	14	14	0	2	1	0
28	DF	Daniele Gastaldello	33	33	3	33	33	3	0	0	0
3	MF	Reto Ziegler	38	32	2	37	31	2	1	1	0
7	MF	Daniele Mannini	38	27	6	36	25	5	2	2	1
8	MF	Luciano Zauri	33	26	0	32	25	0	1	1	0
12	MF	Fernando Tissone	31	17	0	29	15	0	2	2	0
16	MF	Andrea Poli	32	26	0	31	26	0	1	0	0
17	MF	Angelo Palombo	38	38	3	36	36	2	2	2	1
18	MF	Stefano Guberti	16	13	2	16	13	2	0	0	0
19	MF	Daniele Franceschini	7	2	0	6	1	0	1	1	0
20	MF	Marco Padalino	22	7	3	20	6	2	2	1	1
77	MF	Franco Semioli	26	25	2	26	25	2	0	0	0
91	MF	Roberto Soriano	0	0	0	0	0	0	0	0	0
9	FW	Nicola Pozzi	19	8	2	18	7	2	1	1	0
10	FW	Giampaolo Pazzini	39	38	21	37	37	19	2	1	2
11	FW	Claudio Bellucci	10	4	0	8	3	0	2	1	0
11	FW	Stefan Šćepović	2	1	0	2	1	0	0	0	0
88	FW	Salvatore Foti	0	0	0	0	0	0	0	0	0
90	FW	Emanuele Testardi	5	0	0	5	0	0	0	0	0
99	FW	Antonio Cassano	33	31	11	32	30	9	1	1	2

== Goalscorers ==
	Total	Serie A
Pazzini	21	19
Cassano	11	9
Mannini	6	5
Gastaldello	3	3
Palombo	3	2
Padalino	3	2
Semioli	2	2
Pozzi	2	2
Guberti	2	2
Ziegler	2	2
Rossi	1	1
