= 2010–11 UC Sampdoria season =

Sampdoria
2010–11 season
- President: Riccardo Garrone
- Head Coach: Domenico Di Carlo (until 7 March); Alberto Cavasin (from 7 March)
- Serie A: 18th (Relegated to Serie B)
- Coppa Italia: Quarter-finals
- UEFA Champions League: Play–off Round
- UEFA Europa League: Group stage
- Top goalscorer: League: Nicola Pozzi, Giampaolo Pazzini (6); All: Giampaolo Pazzini (11)
Home colours	Away colours	Third colours

The 2010–11 season is Sampdoria's 64th in existence, and eighth consecutive season Serie A. Sampdoria finished the 2009–10 Serie A season in fourth place.

Sampdoria competed in the UEFA Champions League for the first time since finishing runner-up in 1991–92.

The season was a disastrous one relative to the success of 2009–10, with the club suffering relegation following the January departures of star players Antonio Cassano and Giampaolo Pazzini.

== Pre-season and friendlies ==
A total of 29 players gathered for the beginning of pre-season training at Moena on 6 July.

14 July 2010 Friendly	Monti Pallidi (Italy)	0–15	(Italy) Sampdoria	Moena, Italy
		Report	Cacciatore 9'; Cassano 30', 32'; Marilungo 35' (pen.); Obiang 36', 40'; Foti 50', 58'; Zaza 55', 86'; Koman 59'; Pozzi 65', 77', 84', 88'	Stadium: Stadio Cesare Benatti; Attendance: 900; Referee: Giacomo Frisanco

17 July 2010 Friendly	Bolzano (Italy)	0–17	(Italy) Sampdoria	Moena, Italy
		Report	Pozzi 7', 28', 29', 34'; Cassano 13', 45'; Dessena 31'; Cacciatore 49', 76', 77'; Foti 52', 60', 80', 85'; Marilungo 58', 90'; Bradiani 83' (o.g.)	Stadium: Stadio Cesare Benatti; Attendance: 2,000; Referee: Pederzoli

20 July 2010^{1} Friendly	Sampdoria (Italy)	4–0	(Hungary) Bőcs	Moena, Italy
	Koman 17', 25'; Cassano 32'; Foti 85'	Report		Stadium: Stadio Cesare Benatti; Attendance: 500; Referee: Andrea Saggese

25 July 2010 Friendly	Porto (Portugal)	2–1	(Italy) Sampdoria	Porto, Portugal
	Fernando 21'; Hulk 24', (yellow card) 38'	Report	Mannini (yellow card) 19'; Cassano 28' (pen.); Gastaldello (yellow card) 85'	Stadium: Estádio do Dragão; Attendance: 39,000; Referee: Jorge Sousa (Portugal)

31 July 2010 Ciutat de Barcelona Trophy	Espanyol (Spain)	0–0 (6–5 p)	(Italy) Sampdoria	Cornellà de Llobregat, Spain
	Álvarez (yellow card) 61'	Report	Mannini (yellow card) 32'; Lucchini (yellow card) 37'; Dessena (yellow card) 57'; Gastaldello (yellow card) 59'; Pozzi (yellow card) 83'	Stadium: Estadi Cornellà-El Prat; Referee: Alfonso Javier Álvarez Izquierdo (Spain)
	Penalties
	Alonso (penalty scored); Álvarez (penalty missed); Fonte (penalty scored); Vázquez (penalty scored); E. López (penalty scored); Pau (penalty scored); Galán (penalty scored)		(penalty missed) Cacciatore; (penalty scored) Koman; (penalty scored) Dessena; (penalty scored) Pozzi; (penalty scored) Gastaldello; (penalty scored) Semioli; (penalty missed) Volta

4 August 2010 Friendly	Sampdoria (Italy)	2–0	(Italy) Südtirol	Moena, Italy
	Palombo 73'; Pozzi 82'	Report	Romano (yellow card) 90'	Stadium: Stadio Cesare Benatti; Referee: Andrea Saggese

7 August 2010 Friendly	1. FC Köln (Germany)	2–0	(Italy) Sampdoria	Cologne, Germany
	Novaković 8'; Freis 34'	Report		Stadium: RheinEnergieStadion; Attendance: 12,000; Referee: Christian Bandurski (Germany)

12 August 2010 Friendly	Verbania (Italy)	0–10	(Italy) Sampdoria	Verbania, Italy
		Report	Gastaldello 7'; Marilungo 23', 49', 54'; Pazzini 26'; Guberti 35'; Mannini 60'; Galuppini 71'; Rizzo 77'; Foti 82'	Stadium: Stadio Carlo Pedroli; Attendance: 3,000; Referee: Beatrice Archesso

^{1} Match played in three 30-minute segments.

== Competitions ==
=== Serie A ===
==== League table ====
Pos	Team	Pld	W	D	L	GF	GA	GD	Pts	Qualification or relegation
16	Bologna	38	11	12	15	35	52	−17	42 (Note: Bologna were deducted a total 3 points: 1 point because of unpaid taxes, plus 2 points because of unpaid wages.)	
17	Lecce	38	11	8	19	46	66	−20	41	
18	Sampdoria (R)	38	8	12	18	33	49	−16	36	Relegation to Serie B
19	Brescia (R)	38	7	11	20	34	52	−18	32	Relegation to Serie B
20	Bari (R)	38	5	9	24	27	56	−29	24	Relegation to Serie B

Source: Lega Serie A
Rules for classification: 1) points; 2) head-to-head points; 3) head-to-head goal difference; 4) head-to-head goals scored; 5) goal difference; 6) number of goals scored.
(R) Relegated

==== Results summary ====
Overall								Home						Away					
Pld	W	D	L	GF	GA	GD	Pts	W	D	L	GF	GA	GD	W	D	L	GF	GA	GD
38	8	12	18	33	50	−17	36	5	6	8	21	20	+1	3	6	10	12	30	−18

Last updated: 22 May 2011.
Source: Competitive matches

==== Results by round ====
Round	1	2	3	4	5	6	7	8	9	10	11	12	13	14	15	16	17	18	19	20	21	22	23	24	25	26	27	28	29	30	31	32	33	34	35	36	37	38
Ground	H	A	H	A	H	A	H	A	A	H	A	H	A	H	H	A	H	A	H	A	H	A	H	A	H	A	H	H	A	H	A	H	A	A	H	A	H	A
Result	W	D	L	D	D	D	W	D	W	D	L	D	W	D	W	L	L	L	W	L	D	L	L	L	W	D	L	L	L	L	D	L	L	W	D	L	L	L
Position	3	3	11	9	12	14	7	8	6	6	7	10	8	8	6	8	9	10	9	10	10	13	14	14	14	14	14	14	15	16	15	16	18	17	17	18	18	18

Updated to match(es) played on 22 May 2011. Source: Competitive matches
A = Away; H = Home; W = Win; D = Draw; L = Loss

==== Matches ====
29 August 2010 1	Sampdoria	2–0	Lazio	Genoa
20:45 CEST	Cassano 60' (pen.); Guberti 71'	Report		Stadium: Stadio Luigi Ferraris; Attendance: 21,504; Referee: Andrea Romeo

12 September 2010 2	Juventus	3–3	Sampdoria	Turin
15:00 CEST	Marchisio 43'; Pepe 50'; Quagliarella 67'	Report	Pozzi 36', 73'; Cassano 64'	Stadium: Stadio Olimpico; Attendance: 23,949; Referee: Paolo Mazzoleni

19 September 2010 3	Sampdoria	1–2	Napoli	Genoa
CEST	Cassano 78' (pen.)	Report	Hamšík 83'; Cavani 86'	Stadium: Stadio Luigi Ferraris; Attendance: 23,566; Referee: Paolo Valeri

22 September 2010 4	Cagliari	0–0	Sampdoria	Cagliari
20:45 CEST		Report		Stadium: Stadio Sant'Elia; Attendance: 10,000; Referee: Nicola Pierpaoli

26 September 2010 5	Sampdoria	0–0	Udinese	Genoa
15:00 CEST		Report		Stadium: Stadio Luigi Ferraris; Attendance: 21,478; Referee: Andrea Gervasoni

3 October 2010 6	Bologna	1–1	Sampdoria	Bologna
15:00 CEST	Britos 65'	Report	Portanova 45+1' (o.g.)	Stadium: Stadio Renato Dall'Ara; Attendance: 15,431; Referee: Leonardo Baracani

17 October 2010 7	Sampdoria	2–1	Fiorentina	Genoa
15:00 CEST	Ziegler 81'; Cassano 82'	Report	Marchionni 6'	Stadium: Stadio Luigi Ferraris; Attendance: 22,738; Referee: Christian Brighi

24 October 2010 8	Internazionale	1–1	Sampdoria	Milan
20:45 CEST	Eto'o 80'	Report	Guberti 62'	Stadium: San Siro; Attendance: 56,415; Referee: Daniele Orsato

31 October 2010 9	Cesena	0–1	Sampdoria	Cesena
15:00 CET		Report	Pazzini 90+2'	Stadium: Stadio Dino Manuzzi; Attendance: 12,541; Referee: Domenico Celi

7 November 2010 10	Sampdoria	0–0	Catania	Genoa
15:00 CET		Report		Stadium: Stadio Luigi Ferraris; Attendance: 20,778; Referee: Antonio Giannoccaro

11 November 2010 11	Parma	1–0	Sampdoria	Parma
20:45 CET	Bojinov 84'	Report		Stadium: Stadio Ennio Tardini; Attendance: 16,009; Referee: Sebastiano Peruzzo

14 November 2010 12	Sampdoria	0–0	Chievo	Genoa
15:00 CET		Report		Stadium: Stadio Luigi Ferraris; Attendance: 20,526; Referee: Riccardo Pinzani

21 November 2010 13	Lecce	2–3	Sampdoria	Lecce
15:00 CET	Di Michele 72'; Diamoutene 83'	Report	Pazzini 8', 39' (pen.), 88'	Stadium: Stadio Via del Mare; Attendance: 6,609; Referee: Gabriele Gava

27 November 2010 14	Sampdoria	1–1	Milan	Genoa
18:00 CET	Pazzini 59'	Report	Robinho 43'	Stadium: Stadio Luigi Ferraris; Attendance: 26,820; Referee: Paolo Mazzoleni

5 December 2010 15	Sampdoria	3–0	Bari	Genoa
15:00 CET	Pazzini 17' (pen.); Guberti 56', 61'	Report		Stadium: Stadio Luigi Ferraris; Attendance: 20,877; Referee: Nicola Pierpaoli

12 December 2010 16	Brescia	1–0	Sampdoria	Brescia
15:00 CET	Córdova 13'	Report		Stadium: Stadio Mario Rigamonti; Attendance: 11,403; Referee: Antonio Giannoccaro

6 January 2011 18	Palermo	3–0	Sampdoria	Palermo
15:00 CET	Miccoli 37'; Migliaccio 50'; Maccarone 79'	Report		Stadium: Stadio Renzo Barbera; Attendance: 26,020; Referee: Domenico Celi

9 January 2011 19	Sampdoria	2–1	Roma	Genoa
12:30 CET	Pozzi 58' (pen.); Guberti 84'	Report	Vučinić 17'	Stadium: Stadio Luigi Ferraris; Attendance: 22,802; Referee: Gianluca Rocchi

16 January 2011 20	Lazio	1–0	Sampdoria	Rome
15:00 CET	Kozák 84'	Report		Stadium: Stadio Olimpico; Attendance: 21,833; Referee: Nicola Rizzoli

23 January 2011 21	Sampdoria	0–0	Juventus	Genoa
15:00 CET		Report		Stadium: Stadio Luigi Ferraris; Attendance: 25,933; Referee: Paolo Valeri

30 January 2011 22	Napoli	4–0	Sampdoria	Naples
15:00 CET	Cavani 16', 45' (pen.), 57'; Hamšík 48'	Report		Stadium: Stadio San Paolo; Attendance: 48,084; Referee: Gianluca Rocchi

2 February 2011 23	Sampdoria	0–1	Cagliari	Genoa
20:45 CET		Report	Nainggolan 37'	Stadium: Stadio Luigi Ferraris; Attendance: 20,494; Referee: Sebastiano Peruzzo

5 February 2011 24	Udinese	2–0	Sampdoria	Udine
18:00 CET	Sánchez 17'; Di Natale 40'	Report		Stadium: Stadio Friuli; Attendance: 14,383; Referee: Nicola Pierpaoli

13 February 2011 25	Sampdoria	3–1	Bologna	Genoa
15:00 CET	Palombo 8'; Gastaldello 11'; Maccarone 15'	Report	Paponi 65'	Stadium: Stadio Luigi Ferraris; Attendance: 20,924; Referee: Andrea Gervasoni

16 February 2011 17	Sampdoria	0–1	Genoa	Genoa
18:30 CET		Report	Rafinha 55'	Stadium: Stadio Luigi Ferraris; Attendance: 31,500; Referee: Emidio Morganti

20 February 2011 26	Fiorentina	0–0	Sampdoria	Florence
15:00 CET		Report		Stadium: Stadio Artemio Franchi; Attendance: 21,723; Referee: Nicola Rizzoli

27 February 2011 27	Sampdoria	0–2	Internazionale	Genoa
20:45 CET		Report	Sneijder 73'; Eto'o 90+4'	Stadium: Stadio Luigi Ferraris; Attendance: 24,417; Referee: Andrea Gervasoni

6 March 2011 28	Sampdoria	2–3	Cesena	Genoa
12:30 CET	Volta 82'; Maccarone 90+2' (pen.)	Report	Parolo 43'; Giaccherini 46', 47'	Stadium: Stadio Luigi Ferraris; Attendance: 21,215; Referee: Nicola Pierpaoli

13 March 2011 29	Catania	1–0	Sampdoria	Catania
15:00 CET	Llama 78'	Report		Stadium: Stadio Angelo Massimino; Attendance: 12,541; Referee: Nicola Rizzoli

20 March 2011 30	Sampdoria	0–1	Parma	Genoa
15:00 CET		Report	Zaccardo 65'	Stadium: Stadio Luigi Ferraris; Attendance: 21,895; Referee: Paolo Valeri

3 April 2011 31	Chievo	0–0	Sampdoria	Verona
15:00 CEST		Report		Stadium: Stadio Marc'Antonio Bentegodi; Attendance: 14,456; Referee: Christian Brighi

10 April 2011 32	Sampdoria	1–2	Lecce	Genoa
15:00 CEST	Maccarone 69'	Report	Di Michele 39'; Olivera 66'	Stadium: Stadio Luigi Ferraris; Attendance: 26,531; Referee: Paolo Tagliavento

16 April 2011 33	Milan	3–0	Sampdoria	Milan
20:45 CEST	Seedorf 20'; Cassano 54' (pen.); Robinho 61'	Report		Stadium: San Siro; Attendance: 60,028; Referee: Domenico Celi

23 April 2011 34	Bari	0–1	Sampdoria	Bari
15:00 CEST		Report	Pozzi 59' (pen.)	Stadium: Stadio San Nicola; Attendance: 14,881; Referee: Andrea Gervasoni

1 May 2011 35	Sampdoria	3–3	Brescia	Genoa
15:00 CEST	Pozzi 55'; Tissone 63'; Mannini 90+1'	Report	Éder 50'; Caracciolo 57', 84'	Stadium: Stadio Luigi Ferraris; Attendance: 25,055; Referee: Gianluca Rocchi

8 May 2011 36	Genoa	2–1	Sampdoria	Genoa
20:45 CEST	Floro Flores 45+1'; Boselli 90+7'	Report	Pozzi 66'	Stadium: Stadio Luigi Ferraris; Attendance: 29,465; Referee: Paolo Tagliavento

15 May 2011 37	Sampdoria	1–2	Palermo	Genoa
CEST	Biabiany 50'	Report	Miccoli 45+1'; Pinilla 86'	Stadium: Stadio Luigi Ferraris; Attendance: 24,221; Referee: Paolo Mazzoleni

22 May 2011 38	Roma	3–1	Sampdoria	Rome
20:45 CEST	Totti 30'; Vučinić 70'; Borriello 86'	Report	Mannini 26'	Stadium: Stadio Olimpico; Attendance: 28,944; Referee: Luca Banti

=== Coppa Italia ===
Based on their finish in the 2009–10 season, Sampdoria began the 2010–11 Coppa Italia in the round of 16.

19 January 2011 Round of 16	Sampdoria	2–2 (a.e.t.) (5–4 p)	Udinese	Genoa
17:30 CET	Macheda 31'; Mannini (yellow card) 51'; Volta (yellow card) 65'; Poli (yellow card) 70'; Dessena (red card) 99'; Pazzini 108' (pen.); Tissone (yellow card) 115'	Report	Isla 90'; Denis 91'; Sánchez (yellow card) 92'; Coda (yellow card) 105'; Cuadrado (yellow card) 113'	Stadium: Stadio Luigi Ferraris; Attendance: 5,082; Referee: Domenico Celi
	Penalties
	Mannini (penalty scored); Pozzi (penalty scored); Guberti (penalty scored); Ziegler (penalty missed); Pazzini (penalty scored); Tissone (penalty scored)		(penalty scored) Sánchez; (penalty scored) Abdi; (penalty scored) Inler; (penalty scored) Armero; (penalty missed) Denis; (penalty missed) Isla

26 January 2011 Quarter-finals	Sampdoria	1–2	Milan	Genoa
17:30 CET	Maccarone (yellow card) 43'; Guberti 51'	Report	Pato 17', 22'; Oddo (yellow card) 82'	Stadium: Stadio Luigi Ferraris; Attendance: 11,458; Referee: Paolo Mazzoleni

=== UEFA Champions League ===
By finishing in fourth position in Serie A, Sampdoria will play in the play-off round of the Champions League. The draw for the play-off round took place on 6 August. Sampdoria were unseeded in the non-Champions route of the draw. They were drawn against four time German champions Werder Bremen.

The first leg, played at Weserstadion in Bremen, was won 3–1 by the home side. Werder Bremen scored all three of their goals in the second half, including a 67th minute penalty from Torsten Frings. The penalty was given after Stefano Lucchini brought down Sebastian Prödl in the area. Lucchini was given a second yellow card for the foul, which led to his sending off. In the last moments of the match, Giampaolo Pazzini gave Sampdoria some hope with an away goal.

The return at Stadio Luigi Ferraris in Genoa saw Sampdoria jump out to an early lead on a pair of Giampaolo Pazzini goals. Antonio Cassano scored a late goal to put Sampdoria ahead 3–0 in the match and ahead 4–3 on aggregate score. In added time, Werder Bremen answered back through Markus Rosenberg to force extra time. In the first half of extra time, Claudio Pizarro scored giving Werder Bremen a 5–4 lead on aggregate. Sampdoria were unable to respond, and they were eliminated from Champions League play.

==== Play-off round ====
18 August 2010 First leg	Werder Bremen (Germany)	3–1	(Italy) Sampdoria	Bremen, Germany
20:45 CEST	Fritz 51', (yellow card) 53'; Frings 67' (pen.); Pizarro 69'	Report	Volta (yellow card) 18'; Ziegler (yellow card) 52'; Lucchini (yellow card) 61' (yellow-red card) 66'; Cassano (yellow card) 81'; Pazzini 90'	Stadium: Weserstadion; Attendance: 25,276; Referee: Stéphane Lannoy (France)

24 August 2010 Second leg	Sampdoria (Italy)	3–2 (a.e.t.) (4–5 agg.)	(Germany) Werder Bremen	Genoa, Italy
20:45 CEST	Pazzini 8', 13'; Dessena (yellow card) 23'; Gastaldello (yellow card) 77'; Cassano 85'; Palombo (yellow card) 88'	Report	Prödl (yellow card) 13'; Arnautović (yellow card) 79'; Rosenberg 90+3'; Pizarro (yellow card) 93', (goal) 100'	Stadium: Stadio Luigi Ferraris; Attendance: 27,574; Referee: Viktor Kassai (Hungary)

=== UEFA Europa League ===
As a result of their elimination from the Champions League, Sampdoria entered the 2010–11 UEFA Europa League in the group stage.

The draw took place on 27 August. Sampdoria were drawn to play in Group I along with PSV from the Netherlands, Ukrainian club Metalist Kharkiv and Hungarian club Debrecen. They finished a distant third in the group, with only one win, against Debrecen.

==== Group stage ====
Pos	Team	Pld	W	D	L	GF	GA	GD	Pts	Qualification	PSV	MET	SAM	DEB
1	(Netherlands) PSV Eindhoven	6	4	2	0	10	3	+7	14	Advance to knockout phase	—	0–0	1–1	3–0
2	(Ukraine) Metalist Kharkiv	6	3	2	1	9	4	+5	11	Advance to knockout phase	0–2	—	2–1	2–1
3	(Italy) Sampdoria	6	1	2	3	4	7	−3	5		1–2	0–0	—	1–0
4	(Hungary) Debrecen	6	1	0	5	4	13	−9	3		1–2	0–5	2–0	—

Source: Soccerway

16 September 2010 1	PSV (Netherlands)	1–1	(Italy) Sampdoria	Eindhoven, Netherlands
21:05	Dzsudzsák (yellow card) 71', (goal) 90'	Report	Semioli (yellow card) 12'; Cacciatore 25', (yellow card) 63'; Mannini (yellow card) 35'; Koman (yellow card) 41'; Padalino (yellow card) 89'	Stadium: Philips Stadion; Attendance: 17,500; Referee: Knut Kircher (Germany)

30 September 2010 2	Sampdoria (Italy)	1–0	(Hungary) Debrecen	Genoa, Italy
19:00	Pazzini 18' (pen.); Lucchini (yellow card) 58'	Report	Mijadinoski (yellow card) 18'; Laczkó (yellow card) 18'; Kiss (yellow card) 62'	Stadium: Stadio Luigi Ferraris; Attendance: 12,159; Referee: Libor Kovařík (Czech Republic)

21 October 2010 3	Metalist Kharkiv (Ukraine)	2–1	(Italy) Sampdoria	Kharkiv, Ukraine
19:00	Taison 38', (red card) 56'; Dević (yellow card) 46'; Fininho (yellow card) 50'; Xavier 73'	Report	Cacciatore (yellow card) 26'; Koman 32'; Gastaldello (yellow card) 52'; Volta (yellow card) 56'	Stadium: Metalist Stadium; Attendance: 34,580; Referee: Florian Meyer (Germany)

4 November 2010 4	Sampdoria (Italy)	0–0	(Ukraine) Metalist Kharkiv	Genoa, Italy
21:05	Gastaldello (yellow card) 42'	Report	Gueye (yellow card) 45'; Dišljenković (yellow card) 89'	Stadium: Stadio Luigi Ferraris; Attendance: 13,259; Referee: Fernando Teixeira Vitienes (Spain)

1 December 2010 5	Sampdoria (Italy)	1–2	(Netherlands) PSV Eindhoven	Genoa, Italy
19:00	Pazzini 45+3'; Gastaldello (yellow card) 70'; Poli (yellow card) 75'; Marilungo (yellow card) 76' (yellow-red card) 89'; Dessena (yellow card) 90+3'	Report	Toivonen (yellow card) 45+2', (goal) 51', 90'; Marcelo (yellow card) 63'; Pieters (yellow card) 76'	Stadium: Stadio Luigi Ferraris; Attendance: 12,131; Referee: Markus Strömbergsson (Sweden)

16 December 2010 6	Debrecen (Hungary)	2–0	(Italy) Sampdoria	Budapest, Hungary^{1}
21:05	Kabát 48'; Bódi (yellow card) 78'; Volta 86' (o.g.)	Report	Rossini (yellow card) 81'	Stadium: Ferenc Puskás Stadium; Attendance: 5,500; Referee: Stanislav Sukhina (Russia)

Note 1: Debrecen played their group matches in Budapest at Ferenc Puskás Stadium as Debrecen's Stadion Oláh Gábor Út did not meet UEFA criteria.

== Squad statistics ==
As of 22 May (end of the season)

No.	Pos.	Name	League		Coppa Italia		Europe		Total		Discipline^{1}	
No.	Pos.	Name	Apps	Goals	Apps	Goals	Apps	Goals	Apps	Goals	Yellow card	Red card
1	GK	(Brazil) Angelo da Costa	4	-8	2	-4	2	-2	8	-14	1	0
2	DF	(Croatia) Vedran Celjak	0	0	0	0	0	0	0	0	0	0
3	DF	(Switzerland) Reto Ziegler	34	1	2	0	6	0	42	1	5	0
4	MF	(Italy) Daniele Dessena	22	0	1	0	7	0	30	0	5	1
5	DF	(Italy) Pietro Accardi	9	0	1	0	1	0	11	0	3	0
6	DF	(Italy) Stefano Lucchini	26	0	1	0	3	0	30	0	9	2
7	MF	(Italy) Daniele Mannini	30	2	2	0	8	0	40	2	8	1
8	MF	(Italy) Stefano Guberti	36	5	2	1	8	0	46	6	2	0
9	FW	(Italy) Nicola Pozzi	22	6	1	0	3	0	26	6	3	0
10	FW	(Italy) Giampaolo Pazzini	19	6	1	1	5	5	25	12	3	0
11	MF	(Hungary) Vladimir Koman	26	0	1	0	6	1	33	1	2	0
12	MF	(Argentina) Fernando Tissone	22	1	2	0	3	0	27	1	6	1
13	DF	(Italy) Romano Perticone	0	0	0	0	0	0	0	0	0	0
14	MF	(Spain) Pedro Obiang	4	0	0	0	1	0	5	0	0	0
16	MF	(Italy) Andrea Poli	21	0	2	0	5	0	28	0	9	1
17	MF	(Italy) Angelo Palombo	34	1	2	0	6	0	42	1	3	0
18	DF	(Hungary) Zsolt Laczkó	9	0	0	0	0	0	9	0	2	0
19	DF	(Italy) Fabrizio Cacciatore	5	0	0	0	5	1	10	1	3	0
20	MF	(Italy) Marco Padalino	1	0	0	0	1	0	2	0	1	0
21	MF	(Italy) Paolo Sammarco	0	0	0	0	1	0	1	0	0	0
22	GK	(Italy) Vincenzo Fiorillo	0	0	0	0	0	0	0	0	0	0
23	DF	(Lithuania) Marius Stankevičius	0	0	0	0	2	0	2	0	0	0
23	FW	(Uruguay) Bruno Fornaroli	1	0	0	0	0	0	1	0	0	0
24	DF	(Switzerland) Jonathan Rossini	0	0	0	0	1	0	1	0	1	0
25	DF	(Costa Rica) Gilberto Martínez	9	0	0	0	0	0	9	0	2	0
26	DF	(Italy) Massimo Volta	25	1	2	0	8	0	35	1	12	0
27	MF	(France) Jonathan Biabiany	16	1	0	0	0	0	16	1	1	0
28	DF	(Italy) Daniele Gastaldello	29	1	1	0	6	0	36	1	12	1
32	FW	(Italy) Massimo Maccarone	17	3	1	0	0	0	18	3	1	0
41	FW	(Italy) Federico Macheda	14	0	2	1	0	0	16	1	2	0
52	DF	(Italy) Andrea Grieco	0	0	0	0	1	0	1	0	0	0
53	DF	(Italy) Fabio Lamorte	0	0	0	0	1	0	1	0	0	0
54	DF	(Italy) Daniele Messina	0	0	0	0	1	0	1	0	0	0
55	MF	(Serbia) Nenad Krstičić	0	0	0	0	1	0	1	0	0	0
77	MF	(Italy) Franco Semioli	7	0	0	0	3	0	10	0	1	0
78	DF	(Italy) Luciano Zauri	27	0	1	0	1	0	29	0	2	0
85	GK	(Italy) Gianluca Curci	35	-40	0	0	6	-10	41	-50	2	0
88	FW	(Italy) Salvatore Foti	0	0	0	0	0	0	0	0	0	0
89	FW	(Italy) Guido Marilungo	15	0	0	0	5	0	20	0	3	1
91	FW	(Italy) Simone Zaza	2	0	0	0	0	0	2	0	0	0
99	FW	(Italy) Antonio Cassano	7	4	0	0	5	1	12	5	2	0

^{1}Disciplinary record for all competitions.
