= Mario Cassano =

Italian former professional footballer

Personal information
- Date of birth: 8 October 1983 (age 43)
- Place of birth: Vizzolo Predabissi, Italy
- Height: 1.85 m (6 ft 1 in)
- Position: Goalkeeper

Youth career
- 2001–2002: Fiorentina
- 2002–2003: Empoli

Senior career*
| Years | Team | Apps | (Gls) |
| 1999–2001 | Voghera | 35 | (0) |
| 2001–2002 | Fiorentina | 2 | (0) |
| 2002–2005 | Empoli | 12 | (0) |
| 2005–2012 | Piacenza | 161 | (0) |
| 2009–2010 | → Reggina (loan) | 17 | (0) |
| 2010 | → Sampdoria (loan) | 7 | (0) |

International career^{‡}
| 2003–2004 | Italy U-20 | 6 | (0) |
| 2005 | Italy U-21 Serie B | 1 | (0) |
- * Club domestic league appearances and goals as of 28 August 2010 ‡ National team caps and goals as of 18 March 2005

Mario Cassano (born 8 October 1983) is an Italian former professional footballer who played as a goalkeeper.

== Club career ==
Born in Vizzolo Predabissi, Lombardy, Cassano started his senior career at Serie D side Voghera, located a nearby province. In the summer of 2001, he joined A.C. Fiorentina and played twice for first team. In August 2002, after the bankrupt of La Viola, he joined Empoli F.C. which also located in Tuscany. After 3 seasons as backup goalkeeper, he joined Serie B side Piacenza, where he played as first choice except 2006–07 season behind Ferdinando Coppola (and also injured) and first season shared the role with Gabriele Aldegani. In the 2009–10 season, he swapped clubs with Christian Puggioni, both joined the team on loan. In January 2010, Sampdoria signed Cassano on loan, due to the injury of their first choice Luca Castellazzi and sent Vincenzo Fiorillo to Reggina on loan. However, he worked as backup of Marco Storari, another new signing. At the end of the loan spell, he came back to Piacenza. Cassano was the first choice until December 2011. He was questioned by the prosecutor on 21 March 2012.

Cassano was banned from football in June 2012.

=== Italian football scandal ===
On 1 June 2012, the prosecutor requested to ban Cassano for 5 years due to involvement in the 2011–12 Italian football scandal. It was suspected that the match AlbinoLeffe–Piacenza on 20 December 2010, Atalanta–Piacenza on 19 March 2011 were fixed. Eventually, FIGC announced to ban him for 5 years on 18 June 2012.

== International career ==
Cassano has capped for Italy U20 team, the feeder team of the U21 team, for which the coach also tested several other players. He also received several U21 call-ups but did not play.
