= Stefano Guberti =

Italian footballer

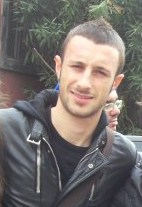

Personal information
- Date of birth: 6 November 1984 (age 42)
- Place of birth: Sesto San Giovanni, Italy
- Height: 1.80 m (5 ft 11 in)
- Position: Winger

Senior career*
Years	Team	Apps	(Gls)
2004–2005	Alghero	25	(1)
2005–2006	Torres	29	(3)
2006–2009	Ascoli	73	(9)
2009	Bari	18	(9)
2009–2010	Roma	6	(0)
2010	→ Sampdoria (loan)	16	(2)
2010–2011	Sampdoria	36	(5)
2011–2012	Roma	0	(0)
2011–2012	→ Torino (loan)	8	(0)
2015–2017	Perugia	47	(5)
2017–2020	Robur Siena	75	(12)
2020–2021	Latte Dolce	15	(0)
2021–2022	Siena	47	(6)
- * Club domestic league appearances and goals as of 23 April 2022

Stefano Guberti (born 6 November 1984) is an Italian former professional footballer who played as a midfielder.

== Career ==
Guberti started his career at Sardinian club Alghero of Serie D. He then played for Sassari Torres in Serie C1. On 30 June 2006, he signed for Ascoli who were then in Serie A. He made his Serie A debut against Atalanta on 10 September 2006.

On 2 February 2009, he joined Bari on a short six-month contract. On selecting the number 17 shirt at Bari, Guberti declared that it was the number I had in Serie A with which I scored my first goal against Milan, so I hope it brings good luck.

On 22 June 2009, he joined Roma for free (as his contract with Bari was expired), signing a four-year contract for roughly €800,000 per season, as confirmed by his new club.

He made his official Roma debut on 30 July 2009, against K.A.A. Gent at UEFA Europa League 3rd qualifying round. On 11 January 2010, U.C. Sampdoria loaned the winger from AS Roma until June 2010. Guberti played for Roma in pre-season, but on 6 August 2010, Sampdoria bought him for €1.5 million, in a co-ownership deal. However, after the club relegated, Sampdoria gave up the registration rights of Guberti and Daniele Mannini for a peppercorn fee of €500 each.

On 15 July 2011, Guberti was loaned to Serie B club Torino with option to co-own the player. Guberti also extended the contract with Roma on the same day, to 2014, and increase the gross basic salary to €1.128 million. To form a co-ownership, the player must had a minimum 2-year left in his former contract with the "mother" club.

In summer 2012 he was suspended for three years due to 2011–12 Italian football scandal.

On 4 March 2021, he returned to Siena, now in Serie D. He helped the club to achieve promotion to Serie C for the 2021–22 season.

== Career statistics ==
As of match played 3 April 2022

Appearances and goals by club, season and competition
Club	Season	League			National Cup		Continental		Other		Total	
Club	Season	Division	Apps	Goals	Apps	Goals	Apps	Goals	Apps	Goals	Apps	Goals
Alghero	2004–05	Serie D	25	1	—		—		—		25	1
Torres	2005–06	Serie C1	29	3	—		—		2 (Note: Appearance(s) in Promotion Playoffs)	0	31	3
Ascoli	2006–07	Serie A	22	1	1	0	—		—		23	1
Ascoli	2007–08	Serie B	40	7	5	3	—		—		45	10
Ascoli	2008–09	Serie B	11	1	3	0	—		—		14	1
Ascoli	Total		73	9	9	3	0	0	0	0	82	12
Bari	2008–09	Serie B	18	9	—		—		—		18	9
Roma	2009–10	Serie A	6	0	0	0	6 (Note: Appearance(s) in UEFA Europa League)	1	—		12	1
Sampdoria (loan)	2009–10	Serie A	16	2	0	0	—		—		16	2
Sampdoria	2010–11	Serie A	36	5	2	1	8 (Note: Two appearances in UEFA Champions League, six appearances in UEFA Europa League)	0	—		46	6
Sampdoria	Total		52	7	2	1	8	0	0	0	62	8
Roma	2012–13	Serie A	0	0	0	0	—		—		0	0
Torino (loan)	2011–12	Serie B	8	0	2	0	—		—		10	0
Perugia	2015–16	Serie B	12	1	0	0	—		—		12	1
Perugia	2016–17	Serie B	35	4	3	0	—		2	0	40	4
Perugia	Total		47	5	3	0	0	0	2	0	52	5
Robur Siena	2017–18	Serie C	32	5	—		—		5	0	37	5
Robur Siena	2018–19	Serie C	32	6	2	0	—		1	0	35	6
Robur Siena	2019–20	Serie C	11	1	0	0	—		1	0	12	1
Robur Siena	Total		75	12	2	0	0	0	7	0	84	12
Latte Dolce	2020–21	Serie D	15	0	—		—		—		15	0
Siena	2020–21	Serie D	1	0	—		—		—		1	0
Siena	2021–22	Serie C	32	2	—		—		—		32	2
Siena	Total		33	2	0	0	0	0	0	0	33	2
Career total			381	48	18	4	14	1	11	0	424	53

== Honours ==
Bari

- Serie B: 2008–09
