= Volodymyr Koman =

Ukrainian footballer (1964–2023)

Personal information
- Date of birth: 20 February 1964
- Place of birth: Uzhhorod, Ukrainian SSR, USSR
- Date of death: 27 September 2023 (aged 59)
- Place of death: Szombathely, Hungary
- Position: Midfielder

Senior career*
Years	Team	Apps	(Gls)
1983–1984	Dynamo Kyiv	1	(0)
1985–1989	Zakarpattia Uzhhorod	160	(28)
1990	Bukovyna Chernivtsi	35	(0)
1990–1992	Szombathelyi Haladás		
1992–1993	Sabaria-Tipo SE	27	(7)

International career
1983	Ukraine		
- * Club domestic league appearances and goals

Volodymyr Mykhaylovych Koman (Ukrainian: Володимир Михайлович Коман; 20 February 1964 – 27 September 2023) was a Ukrainian professional footballer who played as a midfielder. He was the father of Hungarian international Vladimir Koman. In 1983 Koman took part in the Summer Spartakiad of the Peoples of the USSR in the team of Ukrainian SSR. Koman died on 27 September 2023, at the age of 59.
