= Vladimir Koman =

Ukrainian-born Hungarian footballer (born 1989)

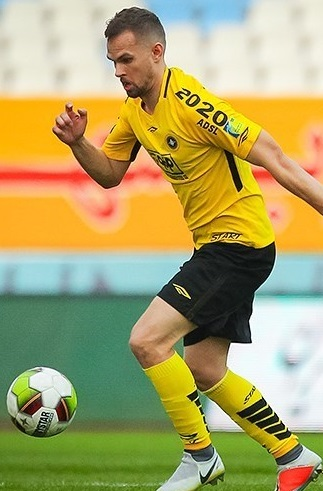
- Koman with Sepahan in 2018

Personal information
- Full name: Vladimir Koman Junior
- Date of birth: 16 March 1989 (age 37)
- Place of birth: Uzhhorod, Ukrainian SSR, Soviet Union
- Height: 1.73 m (5 ft 8 in)
- Positions: Attacking midfielder; winger

Team information
- Current team: Dorog
- Number: 10

Senior career*
Years	Team	Apps	(Gls)
2004–2005	Szombathely	25	(3)
2005–2012	Sampdoria	35	(0)
2008–2009	→ Avellino (loan)	28	(4)
2009–2010	→ Bari (loan)	16	(2)
2012	Monaco	17	(0)
2012–2014	Krasnodar	26	(1)
2013–2014	→ Ural Sverdlosk Oblast (loan)	17	(1)
2015–2016	Diósgyőr	36	(3)
2016–2018	Adanaspor	48	(3)
2018–2020	Sepahan	40	(3)
2020–2021	Hatta	10	(0)
2021–2022	Chennaiyin	17	(3)
2022–2023	Diósgyőr	27	(2)
2025	Kelen	12	(1)
2025–	Dorog	17	(2)

International career
2005–2006	Hungary U17	9	(1)
2006–2007	Hungary U19	9	(1)
2008–2009	Hungary U20	11	(6)
2009–2010	Hungary U21	5	(2)
2010–2015	Hungary	36	(7)
- * Club domestic league appearances and goals as of 14 January 2026

Vladimir Koman Jr. (born 16 March 1989) is a professional footballer who plays as an attacking midfielder. Born in Ukraine, he represented the Hungary national team.

== Club career ==
Koman was born in Uzhhorod, Zakarpattia Oblast, Ukrainian Soviet Socialist Republic, Soviet Union. When he was a child, in 1991, his family moved to Szombathely, where he played his first matches for the local football team Haladás and made his debut in the NB2 league at age 15. His father, Volodymyr Koman, was also a football player. Koman played 25 matches and scored three goals in the 2004–05 season of the Hungarian National Championship II.

=== Sampdoria ===
After joining Italian club Sampdoria, Koman made his Serie A debut on 7 April 2007 starting in the home match against Torino, recording the assist for the match's only goal, scored by Emiliano Bonazzoli. He then led Sampdoria to win the 2007–08 Campionato Nazionale Primavera title, and also took part at the 2008 UEFA European Under-19 Championship captaining the Hungary under-19 national team.

Koman spent the 2008–09 season on loan to Avellino. He scored four goals in 28 matches in Serie B for Avellino.

For the 2009–10, Koman was loaned to Bari. He scored his first Serie A goal against Palermo in a 4–2 win on 30 January 2010, making him the first Hungarian player to score in the Italian top flight in 15 years. He finished the season with two goals in 16 appearances.

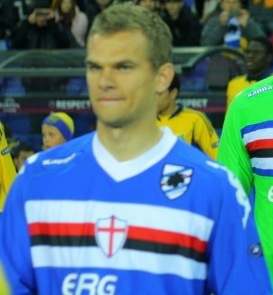
Koman with Sampdoria in 2010

Koman re-joined Sampdoria for the 2010–11 season, becoming a regular member of the squad. In the 2010–11 UEFA Europa League, he assisted a goal against PSV, and scored his first goal against Metalist Kharkiv in the 32nd minute of a Europa League match. Koman was appointed as a captain against Debrecen in the last round of the 2010–11 Europa League.

=== Monaco ===
On 31 January 2012, Koman joined Monaco on a four-and-a-half-year contract. His contract with Sampdoria was set to expire in May 2012. On 15 April, Koman was interviewed after the victory against Metz; he iterated he is expecting his first goal and enjoyed playing in Ligue 2. However, after 17 matches, he left the club for Russian Premier League side Krasnodar.

=== Krasnodar ===
In June 2012, Koman signed a contract with Krasnodar. On 23 July, he made his Premier League debut against Rubin Kazan, a 2–1 victory. He scored his first goal against Volga Nizhny Novgorod in a 1–1 away draw. On 1 July 2014, Krasnodar and Koman mutually terminated their contract, making Koman a free agent.

In August 2014, Hungarian League club Diósgyőr sought to sign Koman, but he rejected the offer. Koman's manager Bálint Kovács confirmed to Nemzeti Sport that Belgian Pro League club Club Brugge expressed interest in signing Koman in September 2014.

On 12 November 2014, Koman was named by American digital media company Bleacher Report as one of the most notable free agents available for the 2014–15 season, along with Víctor Valdés and Simão.

==== FC Ural (on loan) ====
Due to lack of playing time with Krasnodar, in the 2013 summer transfer window, Koman was loaned out to fellow Russian league club Ural Sverdlosk Oblast. He made his debut on 16 September 2013 against Dynamo Moscow, where he played the full match. On 15 May 2014, he scored his first goal in the 2013–14 Russian Premier League season on the 30th matchday against Volga Nizhny Novgorod, in the 45th minute. The match was won by Ural.

=== Diósgyőr ===
On 4 February 2015, Koman joined Hungarian League side Diósgyőr. On 1 August 2015, he scored his first goal for Diósgyőr in the 2015–16 Nemzeti Bajnokság I match in a 2–1 defeat against title-holders Videoton at the DVTK Stadion, Miskolc. He scored the goal from a penalty kick in the ninth minute. On 12 December 2015, he scored his second goal of the season against Békéscsaba 1912 Előre at the DVTK Stadion in the 61st minute.

According to the Croatian SportCom.hr, Croatian First League club Rijeka showed interest in signing Koman. The Croatian club was looking for a player to replace Moisés, who left Rijeka for Série A club Palmeiras.

=== Chennaiyin ===
On 4 September 2021, Koman joined Indian Super League side Chennaiyin on a one-year deal, ahead of the 2021–22 Indian Super League season. He debuted on 23 November against Hyderabad FC in a 1–0 win, where he scored the winner through penalty.

== International career ==
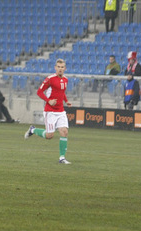
Koman playing for Hungary against Poland in Poznań in 2011.

Koman was part of the Hungary under-20 national team which finished third at the 2009 FIFA U-20 World Cup. He scored five goals in six matches, placing him second on the top goalscorers' list, behind Dominic Adiyiah of Ghana.

Koman was named to the Hungary senior team by head coach Erwin Koeman for the friendlies against Germany and the Netherlands in late May and early June 2010 respectively. He made his senior debut against Germany on 29 May 2010. Koman scored his first international goal against Moldova at the Szusza Ferenc Stadium in a UEFA Euro 2012 qualifying match, where Hungary won 2–1. He scored his second goal against San Marino at the Ferenc Puskás Stadium in another Euro 2012 qualifier. On 7 June 2011, Koman scored his third goal in Euro 2012 qualifying, again against San Marino. Hungary won the match 3–0 away in Serravalle, San Marino. He scored the first goal of the four against Iceland at the Ferenc Stadium, a 4–0 victory.

On 7 September 2012, Hungary began its 2014 FIFA World Cup qualifying campaign with a 5–0 away against Andorra, in which Koman scored Hungary's fifth goal, in the 82nd minute. On 16 October, Hungary battled back to defeat Turkey 3–1 at home; Koman scored the match's equalizer. On 10 September 2013, Koman provided two assists – one for his former under-21 teammate Krisztián Németh and one for Tamás Hajnal – in a 5–1 victory over Estonia in a 2014 World Cup qualifier at the Ferenc Puskás Stadium.

== Personal life ==
In June 2014, Koman married his Russian girlfriend Zarina at the Four Seasons Hotel in Budapest.

== Career statistics ==
=== Club ===
As of 3 March 2022

Appearances and goals by club, season and competition
Club	Season	League			Cup		Continental		Total	
Club	Season	Division	Apps	Goals	Apps	Goals	Apps	Goals	Apps	Goals
Sampdoria	2006–07	Serie A	4	0	0	0	0	0	4	0
Sampdoria	2007–08	Serie A	0	0	0	0	0	0	0	0
Sampdoria	2010–11	Serie A	25	0	1	0	6 (Note: Appearance(s) in UEFA Europa League)	1	32	1
Sampdoria	2011–12	Serie B	6	0	1	0	0	0	7	0
Sampdoria	Total		35	0	2	0	6	1	43	1
Avellino (loan)	2008–09	Serie B	28	4	0	0	0	0	28	4
Bari (loan)	2009–10	Serie A	16	2	1	0	0	0	17	2
Monaco	2011–12	Ligue 2	17	0	0	0	0	0	17	0
Krasnodar	2012–13	Russian Premier League	26	1	2	0	0	0	28	1
Ural Sverdlosk (loan)	2013–14	Russian Premier League	17	1	1	0	0	0	18	1
Diósgyőr	2014–15	Nemzeti Bajnokság I	10	0	0	0	0	0	10	0
Diósgyőr	2015–16	Nemzeti Bajnokság I	26	3	0	0	0	0	26	3
Diósgyőr	Total		36	3	0	0	0	0	36	3
Adanaspor	2016–17	Süper Lig	31	1	1	0	0	0	32	1
Adanaspor	2017–18	TFF First League	17	2	1	0	0	0	18	2
Adanaspor	Total		48	3	2	0	0	0	50	3
Sepahan	2018–19	Persian Gulf Pro League	22	2	4	0	0	0	25	2
Sepahan	2019–20	Persian Gulf Pro League	18	1	1	0	1 (Note: Appearance(s) in AFC Champions League)	0	20	1
Sepahan	Total		40	3	5	0	1	0	46	3
Hatta	2020–21	UAE Pro League	10	0	2	0	0	0	12	0
Chennaiyin	2021–22	Indian Super League	17	3	0	0	0	0	17	3
Career total			289	20	15	0	7	1	311	21

=== International ===
Appearances and goals by national team and year
National team	Year	Apps	Goals
Hungary	2010	7	2
Hungary	2011	11	3
Hungary	2012	7	2
Hungary	2013	9	0
Hungary	2014	2	0
Hungary	2015	0	0
Total		36	7

Scores and results list Hungary's goal tally first, score column indicates score after each Koman goal.

List of international goals scored by Vladimir Koman
No.	Date	Venue	Opponent	Score	Result	Competition
1	7 September 2010	Szusza Stadium, Budapest	Moldova	2–0	2–1	UEFA Euro 2012 qualifying
2	8 October 2010	Ferenc Puskás Stadium, Budapest	San Marino	6–0	8–0	UEFA Euro 2012 qualifying
3	7 June 2011	Stadio Olimpico, Serravalle	San Marino	3–0	3–0	UEFA Euro 2012 qualifying
4	10 August 2011	Ferenc Puskás Stadium, Budapest	Iceland	1–0	4–0	International friendly
5	11 September 2011	Ferenc Puskás Stadium, Budapest	Liechtenstein	4–0	5–0	International friendly
6	7 September 2012	Estadi Comunal, Andorra la Vella	Andorra	5–0	5–0	2014 FIFA World Cup qualifying
7	16 October 2012	Ferenc Puskás Stadium, Budapest	Turkey	1–1	3–1	2014 FIFA World Cup qualifying

== Honours ==
Sampdoria

- Trofeo Giacinto Facchetti: 2007–08

Hungary

- UEFA European Under-17 Championship: final tournament 2006
- UEFA European Under-19 Championship: semi-finalist 2008
- FIFA U-20 World Cup: third place 2009

Individual

- 2009 FIFA U-20 World Cup Silver Shoe
