= Reto Ziegler =

Swiss footballer (born 1986)

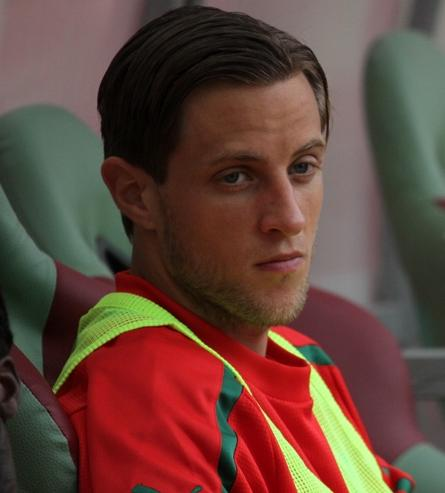
- Ziegler with Lokomotiv Moscow in 2012

Personal information
- Full name: Reto Pirmin Ziegler
- Date of birth: 16 January 1986 (age 40)
- Place of birth: Geneva, Switzerland
- Height: 1.83 m (6 ft 0 in)
- Position: Left-back

Youth career
- 1993–1995: Gland
- 1995–1997: Servette
- 1997–1998: US Terre Sainte
- 1998–2000: Servette
- 2000–2002: Grasshoppers

Senior career*
Years	Team	Apps	(Gls)
2002–2004	Grasshoppers	41	(0)
2004–2007	Tottenham Hotspur	24	(1)
2005–2006	→ Hamburger SV (loan)	8	(0)
2006	→ Wigan Athletic (loan)	10	(0)
2007	→ Sampdoria (loan)	15	(1)
2007–2011	Sampdoria	127	(4)
2011–2015	Juventus	0	(0)
2011–2012	→ Fenerbahçe (loan)	38	(1)
2012–2013	→ Lokomotiv Moscow (loan)	6	(0)
2013	→ Fenerbahçe (loan)	16	(0)
2013–2014	→ Sassuolo (loan)	17	(0)
2015–2017	Sion	72	(12)
2017	Luzern	9	(2)
2018–2020	FC Dallas	80	(11)
2021–2022	Lugano	58	(7)
2023–2025	Sion	62	(9)

International career
2000–2001	Switzerland U15	4	(1)
2001–2003	Switzerland U17	8	(0)
2003–2004	Switzerland U18	4	(0)
2004	Switzerland U19	4	(0)
2004–2009	Switzerland U21	30	(2)
2005–2014	Switzerland	35	(1)
Medal record
Men's football
Representing Switzerland
UEFA European Under-17 Championship
Winner	2002 Denmark
- * Club domestic league appearances and goals

Reto Pirmin Ziegler (French pronunciation: [ʁə.to zi.ɡlɛʁ]; born 16 January 1986) is a Swiss former professional footballer who played as a left-back. He played top-flight football in seven countries. He earned 35 international caps for Switzerland and played at both the 2010 and 2014 FIFA World Cups.

== Club career ==
=== Early career ===
In the summer of 2004, Ziegler signed a contract with Tottenham Hotspur, which was initially meant to begin on 1 January 2005, when his contract with Grasshoppers expired. However, the two clubs – reportedly through the initiative of then-Tottenham sporting director Frank Arnesen – agreed to an immediate transfer, and Ziegler joined Spurs in late August of that year.

=== Tottenham Hotspur ===
Despite being just 18 years old, Ziegler soon made his debut and became an important member of the team under both head coach Jacques Santini, who left in October after just a few months in charge, and his successor, Martin Jol. Ziegler featured mostly at left midfield but also played a few matches as left full-back, often switching position with Timothée Atouba, another versatile left-sided player with the team at the time.

Ziegler featured in 31 matches in all competitions that season, including 23 in the Premier League. He showed great promise and improvement, and became popular with the fans for his attack-minded play on the left side and good passing ability. One of his most memorable moments from that season came in the home loss to Arsenal. Near the end of the game, he played a delicate chipped pass to Frédéric Kanouté, who scored to make it 4–5. Another memorable moment was in the 1 January 2005 match against Everton, where he scored his first goal en route to a 5–2 Tottenham win. At the time, it was his only goal of his professional career. At the end of the season, he was named the JSM Young Player of The Year, an award given to a young Tottenham player by its junior fan club.

In the summer of 2005, Ziegler was sent on loan to German Bundesliga club Hamburger SV, where he featured in 11 league matches and 3 UEFA Cup matches, but was criticised by manager Thomas Doll for a poor attitude and rarely played more than a few minutes per match. He was recalled from the loan by Tottenham in January 2006, only to be put back out on loan, this time at another Premier League club, Wigan Athletic. He played with Wigan until the end of the 2005–06 season, receiving five starts and five substitute appearances in the Premier League and one start in the FA Cup, performing well but not spectacularly. He also appeared as a substitute in the 2006 Football League Cup Final against Manchester United, a 4–0 defeat.

Ziegler returned to Tottenham for the 2006–07 season and featured in four matches, including starts in the League Cup against Milton Keynes Dons and in the UEFA Cup against Slavia Prague, as well as a substitute appearance against Manchester United in the Premier League. On 31 January 2007, he joined Italian Serie A club Sampdoria on loan until the end of the season.

=== Sampdoria ===
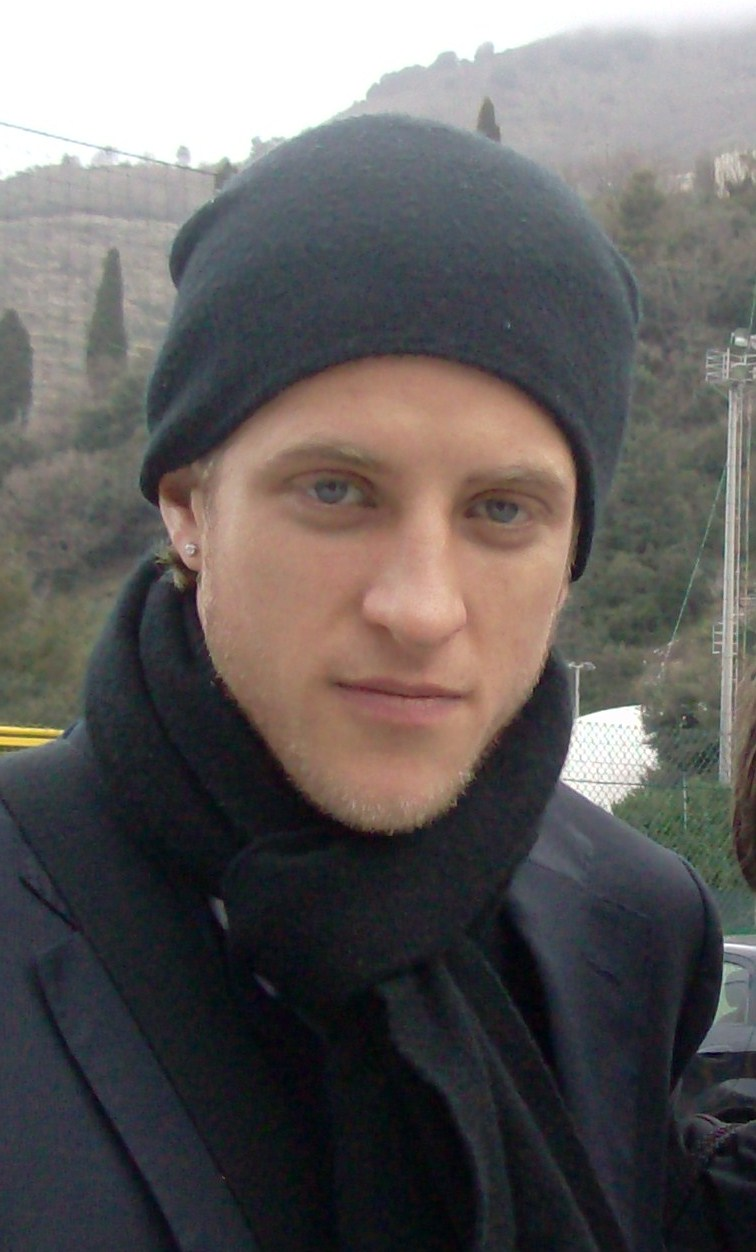
Ziegler with Sampdoria after training

On 18 February 2007, Ziegler played his first Serie A match for Sampdoria against Parma. He scored his first goal in his tenth Serie A appearance for the club against Messina on 21 April 2007. In May, Spurs brought in young left back Gareth Bale, and Ziegler opted to sign for Sampdoria permanently on 3 July 2007. During his first season, he was in and out of the starting line-up, and most of his appearances were substitutions.

Ziegler finally managed to retain his place more regularly during the first half of the 2009–10 season. After a string of substitute appearances, he became first-choice left back. During the winter transfer window, he was linked with a move to Juventus. Having just secured his place in the starting 11, he refuted the transfer rumours saying that he wanted to continue his run in the starting line-up in hopes of being selected for the upcoming FIFA World Cup with Switzerland.

Since his contract would expire on 30 June 2011, in January 2011, Ziegler was linked to Milan, as Sampdoria opted to gain some cash. However, he did not leave. Instead, Sampdoria sold its striker Giampaolo Pazzini and let Antonio Cassano leave as a free agent. The team subsequently performed poorly and were eventually relegated to Serie B.

=== Juventus ===
Ziegler joined Juventus on a free transfer on 26 May 2011, having signed a four-year contract. He passed a medical on 25 May.

=== Fenerbahçe ===
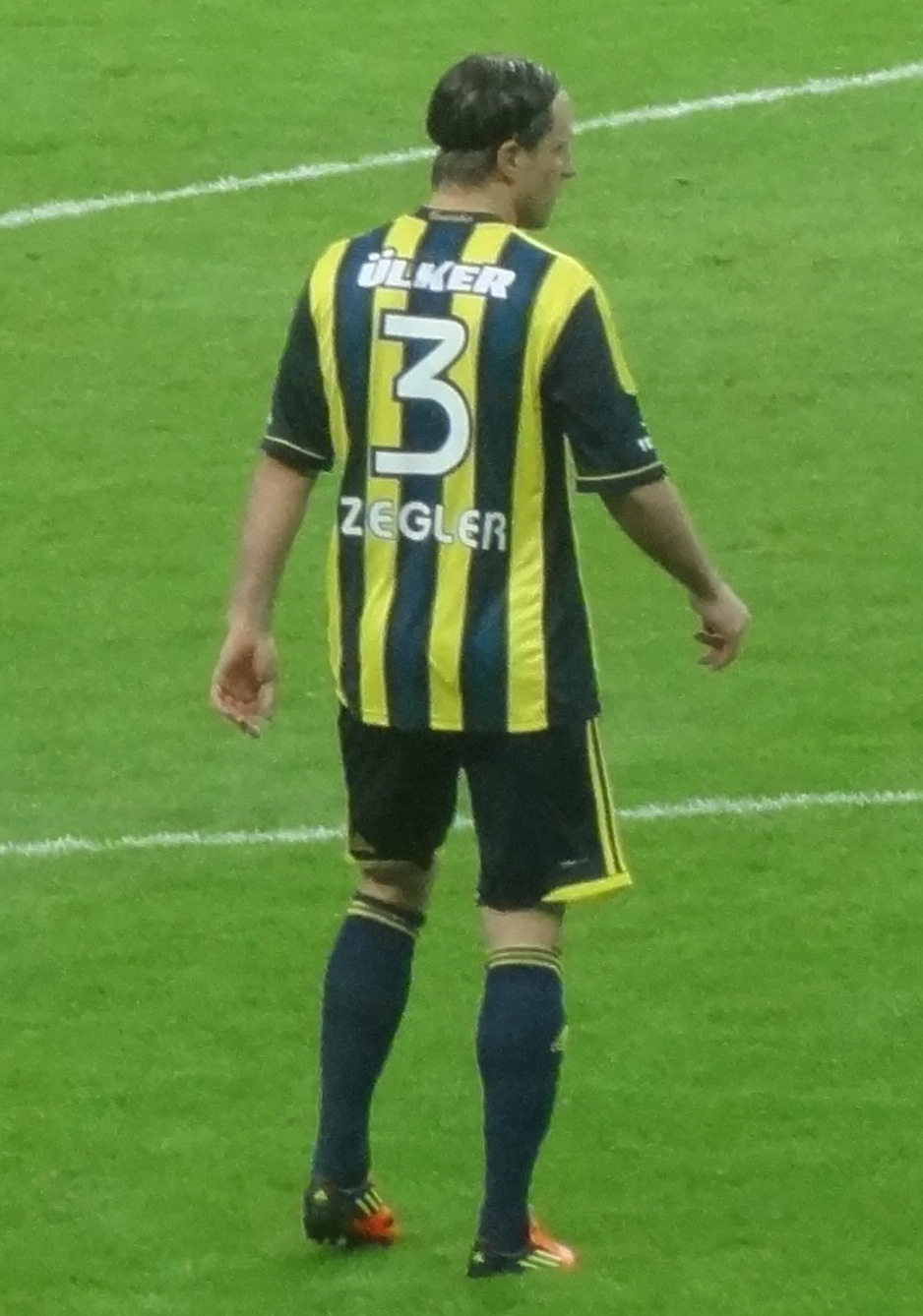
Ziegler with Fenerbahçe

On 2 September 2011, Fenerbahçe announced they were holding discussions with Juventus and Ziegler to loan him for the 2011–12 season. The next day, it was announced that all parties had reached an agreement for his loan. On 22 April 2012, Ziegler scored the first goal in the derby match against Galatasaray, which Fenerbahçe won 2–1.

=== Lokomotiv Moscow ===
After his spell with Fenerbahçe, Ziegler was loaned to Russian Premier League side Lokomotiv Moscow.

=== Fenerbahçe (second spell) ===
Ziegler returned on loan to Fenerbahçe on 31 January 2013 until the end of the 2012–13 season.

=== Sassuolo ===
On 20 August 2013, Sassuolo confirmed it had acquired Ziegler on loan from Juventus for an undisclosed period and fee.

=== Sion ===
On 2 February 2015, Ziegler transferred to Sion in his native Switzerland, signing a six-month contract until the end of the season. He would later sign a new contract with Sion and would play for the club until the end of the 2016–17 season.

=== FC Dallas ===
On 2 January 2018, MLS club FC Dallas announced the signing of Ziegler. In the 2018 season, he was the club's primary starter at left center-back. He scored four goals and was sent off a team-high three times. Ziegler's contract with Dallas expired following their 2020 season.

=== Lugano ===
On 25 February 2021, Ziegler joined FC Lugano.

=== Return to Sion ===
On 25 December 2022, Ziegler signed a 1.5-year contract with Sion.

=== Retirement ===
On 11 October 2025, Ziegler announced his retirement from playing.

== International career ==
Ziegler is a former youth international and was in the Switzerland U-17 squad that won the 2002 U-17 European Championships.

Ziegler made his full debut for Switzerland in a 2006 FIFA World Cup qualification match against France on 26 March 2005, helping his team secure a point through a 0–0 draw at the Stade de France. He gained two more caps before drifting out of the frame and was not named to Switzerland's squad for the 2006 World Cup.

For the Swiss U-21 team, he scored a late free-kick against the Netherlands in September 2008 to send Switzerland through to the play-off round of the 2009 UEFA European Under-21 Championship.

On 19 November 2008, Ziegler scored his only senior goal for Switzerland, a powerful left-footed strike against Finland which won the Swiss the match, 1–0. He was selected for the 2010 World Cup squad. He started at left back and played the full 90 minutes in all three matches in the group stage. Switzerland did not advance out of the group. Ziegler was selected again for Switzerland's 2014 World Cup squad. This time, however, he did not appear in any matches.

== Personal life ==
Ziegler's brother Ronald also played as a professional footballer, including for Swiss side ES FC Malley.

He has been married to Swiss former alpine skier Elodie Rudaz since June 2017. The couple have two daughters.

== Career statistics ==
=== Club ===
As of match played 11 December 2021

Appearances and goals by club, season and competition
Club	Season	League			Cup		Continental		Other		Total	
Club	Season	Division	Apps	Goals	Apps	Goals	Apps	Goals	Apps	Goals	Apps	Goals
Grasshoppers	2002–03	Nationalliga A	10	0	0	0	0	0	—		10	0
Grasshoppers	2003–04	Swiss Super League	31	0	0	0	0	0	—		31	0
Grasshoppers	Total		41	0	0	0	0	0	0	0	41	0
Tottenham	2004–05	Premier League	23	1	5	0	—		3 (Note: Appearances in the League Cup)	0	31	1
Tottenham	2006–07	Premier League	1	0	0	0	2 (Note: Appearances in the UEFA Cup)	0	1	0	4	0
Tottenham	Total		24	1	5	0	2	0	4	0	35	1
Hamburger SV (loan)	2005–06	Bundesliga	8	0	0	0	0	0	—		8	0
Wigan (loan)	2005–06	Premier League	10	0	1	0	—		2	0	13	0
Sampdoria (loan)	2006–07	Serie A	15	1	0	0	—		—		15	1
Sampdoria	2007–08	Serie A	20	0	0	0	0	0	—		20	0
Sampdoria	2008–09	Serie A	22	0	0	0	8	0	—		30	0
Sampdoria	2009–10	Serie A	37	2	1	0	0	0	—		38	2
Sampdoria	2010–11	Serie A	34	1	2	0	6 (Note: Two appearances in the Champions League, four in the Europa League)	0	—		42	1
Sampdoria	Total		113	3	3	0	14	0	0	0	130	3
Juventus	2011–12	Serie A	0	0	0	0	0	0	0	0	0	0
Fenerbahçe (loan)	2011–12	Süper Lig	38	1	4	0	—		—		42	1
Lokomotiv Moscow (loan)	2012–13	Russian Premier League	6	0	1	0	—		—		7	0
Fenerbahçe (loan)	2012–13	Süper Lig	7	0	2	0	8	0	—		17	0
Sassuolo (loan)	2013–14	Serie A	17	0	1	0	—		—		18	0
Sion	2014–15	Swiss Super League	17	1	3	0	—		—		20	1
Sion	2015–16	Swiss Super League	30	3	3	0	7	0	—		40	3
Sion	2016–17	Swiss Super League	25	8	5	1	—		—		30	9
Sion	Total		72	12	11	1	7	0	0	0	90	13
FC Luzern	2017–18	Swiss Super League	9	2	1	0	—		—		10	2
FC Dallas	2018	MLS	30	4	1	0	2 (Note: Appearances in the CONCACAF Champions League)	0	—		33	4
FC Dallas	2019	MLS	33	5	1	1	—		—		34	6
FC Dallas	2020	MLS	17	2	0	0	—		—		17	2
FC Dallas	Total		80	11	2	1	2	0	0	0	84	12
Lugano	2020–21	Swiss Super League	15	1	1	0	—		—		16	1
Lugano	2021–22	Swiss Super League	16	4	2	0	—		—		18	4
Lugano	Total		31	5	3	0	0	0	0	0	34	5
Career total			471	36	34	2	33	0	6	0	544	38

=== International ===
Score and result list Switzerland's goal tally first, score column indicates score after Ziegler goal.

International goal scored by Reto Ziegler
No.	Date	Venue	Opponent	Score	Result	Competition
1	19 November 2008	AFG Arena, St. Gallen, Switzerland	Finland	1–0	1–0	Friendly

== Honours ==
Grasshoppers

- Nationalliga A: 2003

Wigan Athletic

- Football League Cup runner-up: 2005–06

Fenerbahçe

- Turkish Cup: 2011–12, 2012–13

Sion

- Swiss Cup: 2014–15

Lugano

- Swiss Cup: 2021–22

Switzerland U17

- UEFA U-17 European Champion: 2002

Individual

- Swiss Super League Team of the Year: 2016–17
