= Vincenzo Fiorillo =

Italian footballer (born 1990)

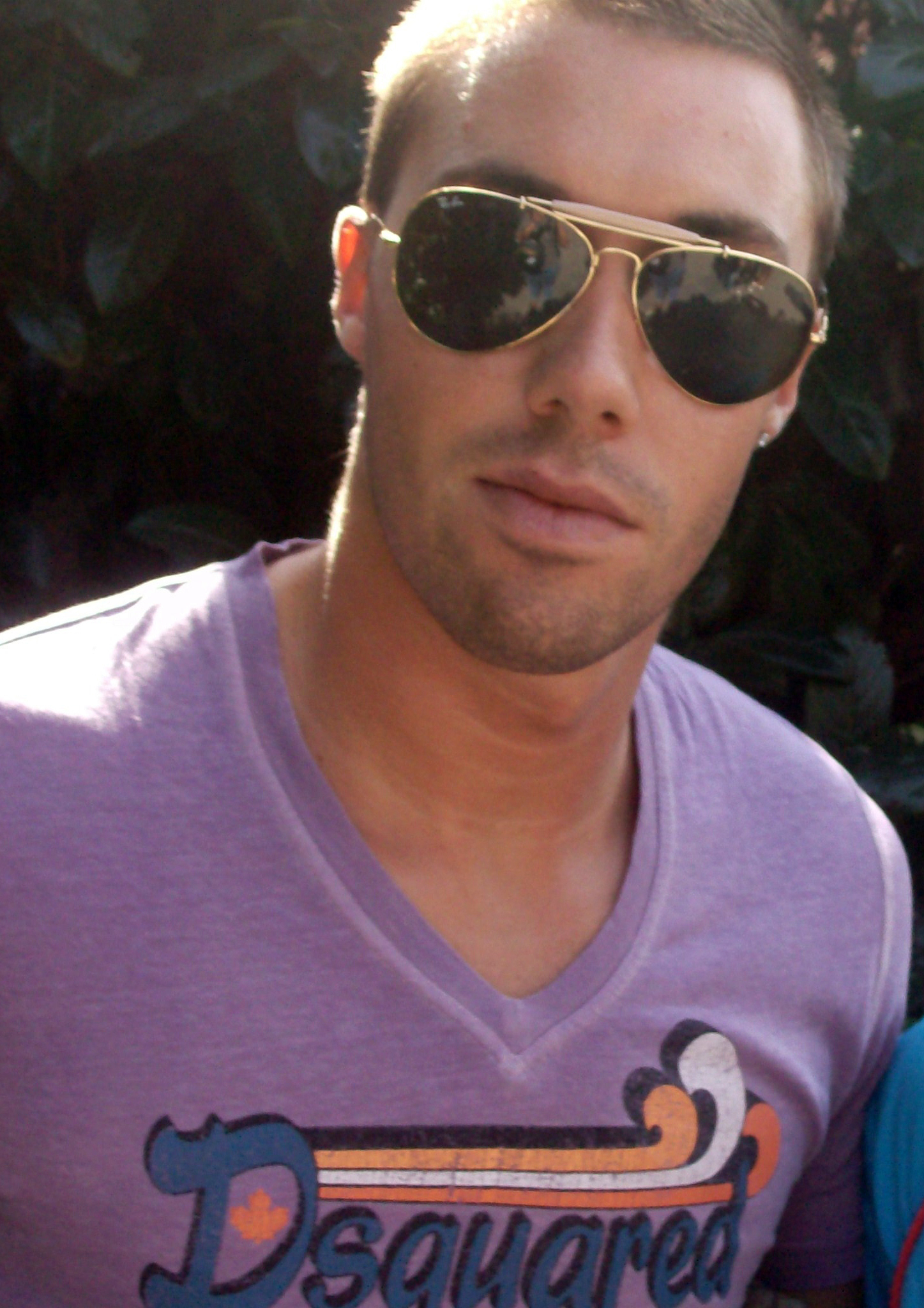
- Fiorillo with Sampdoria in 2011

Personal information
- Full name: Vincenzo Fiorillo
- Date of birth: 13 January 1990 (age 36)
- Place of birth: Genoa, Italy
- Height: 1.91 m (6 ft 3 in)
- Position: Goalkeeper

Team information
- Current team: Pescara
- Number: 90

Youth career
- –2004: Nuova Oregina
- 2004–2009: Sampdoria

Senior career*
Years	Team	Apps	(Gls)
2008–2014	Sampdoria	9	(0)
2010	→ Reggina (loan)	5	(0)
2011	→ Spezia (loan)	8	(0)
2012–2013	→ Livorno (loan)	28	(0)
2014–2016	Juventus	0	(0)
2014–2016	→ Pescara (loan)	59	(0)
2016–2021	Pescara	141	(0)
2021–2025	Salernitana	11	(0)
2025	→ Carrarese (loan)	12	(0)
2025–2026	Carrarese	1	(0)
2026–	Pescara	0	(0)

International career
2006–2007	Italy U-17	4	(0)
2007–2008	Italy U-19	9	(0)
2008–2011	Italy U-20	11	(0)
2009	Italy U-21	3	(0)
2011	Italy U-21 Serie B	2	(0)
- * Club domestic league appearances and goals as of 27 September 2026

Vincenzo Fiorillo (born 13 January 1990) is an Italian professional footballer who plays as a goalkeeper for Serie C Group B club Pescara.

== Club career ==
=== Sampdoria ===
Born in Genoa, Fiorillo started playing football in Nuova Oregina Calcio from the Oregina neighborhood of Genoa. In 2004, he was transferred to local Serie A side, U.C. Sampdoria. He remained within Sampdoria's youth ranks for 5 years, and on 10 April 2008 he was part of the first ever Sampdoria Primavera squad to win the Coppa Italia Primavera. In the final he saved two of four penalties in the shootout against Atalanta, thus securing victory for Blucerchiati. He also won the first ever Campionato Nazionale Primavera for Sampdoria, after he finished as the runner-up with the club in the 2007 edition.

Originally considered a rising star, being even compared to Gianluigi Buffon, Fiorillo made his Serie A debut on 13 April 2008, against Reggina. He remained with Sampdoria for the start of the 2009–10 Serie A campaign, but on 13 January 2010, he was sent on loan to Reggina in an exchange deal for goalkeeper Mario Cassano. After making 5 Serie B appearances for the amaranto Fiorillo returned to Sampdoria on 30 June 2010, upon the expiration of his loan deal.

In January 2011 he left Genoa once again for another 6-month loan to another Ligurian club Spezia, where he appeared in 8 league matches during the second half of the 2010–11 Lega Pro Prima Divisione. After returning to Sampdoria once more, he was successively loaned out again on 4 August 2011– this time to Livorno in the Serie B. With the Tuscan outfit, Fiorillo finally managed to win a first team spot thanks to his impressive performances that were fundamental in his club's ultimate promotion to Serie A following their promotion play-off victory. After 28 league appearances for Livorno, he returned to Sampdoria at the end of his loan spell, remaining as the second-choice keeper to Angelo da Costa Júnior.

=== Juventus ===
In January 2014, Fiorillo was involved in a co-ownership player-exchange deal with 50% of his contract being sold to reigning Serie A champions, Juventus in exchange for 50% of the contractual rights of Juventus' Stefano Beltrame. Both 50% rights were valued for €2 million. As part of the deal, Fiorillo remained with Sampdoria on a six-month temporary loan deal, and Beltrame returned to Bari, with whom he was previously on loan with from Juventus. On 19 June 2014, Juventus and Sampdoria renewed the co-ownership agreement of the player, with Juventus holding the registration rights of the goalkeeper. On 30 June 2014, Fiorillo moved to Juventus upon the expiration of the loan agreement.

==== Pescara (loan) ====
On 23 July 2014, it was officially communicated that Fiorillo signed for Serie B side Pescara on a season-long loan deal along with teammate Gabriel Appelt. Fiorillo wore number 1 shirt for their first team. In June 2015 Juventus acquired Fiorillo outright from Sampdoria for free; Beltrame also returned to Juve in January 2015 in a pure player swap.

On 23 July 2015, Fiorillo returned to Pescara in a temporary deal, with an option to purchase, which would become an obligation if Pescara promoted to 2016–17 Serie A. Fiorillo kept his number 1 shirt for the new season.

=== Pescara ===
After Pescara activated the conditional obligation to buy Fiorillo outright in summer 2016 for €2 million, he remained in Pescara for their 2016–17 Serie A campaign. However, he was the backup of former Argentine internationals Albano Bizzarri instead.

=== Carrarese ===
On 31 January 2025, Fiorillo moved on loan to Carrarese. On 15 July 2025, he returned to Carrarese on a permanent basis.

== International career ==
Fiorillo was a regular member of the national youth teams until his 20th birthday, after which he failed to play for a professional team regularly. Fiorillo played twice in 2007 UEFA European Under-17 Football Championship elite qualification, ahead the regular starter Sergio Viotti.

Fiorillo also was part of the Italy U-19 squad at the 2008 UEFA European Under-19 Football Championship, where he was voted as the best goalkeeper of the competition. In addition, he was one of the youngest members of the Italy squad, as he had also been eligible for the 2009 edition. Fiorillo played once in 2008 qualifying (against Malta), though he was the backup of Ugo Gabrieli for the rest of the matches. He was the starting keeper ahead Carlo Pinsoglio in the elite round. Despite losing to Germany in the final, the Azzurrini still qualified for the 2009 FIFA U-20 World Cup. He took part at the 2009 FIFA U-20 World Cup as the captain of the Italian team in September 2009. He also finished as the runner-up in the 2009 Mediterranean Games as captain.

On 25 March 2009, he made his debut with the Italy U-21 squad in a friendly match against Austria. That match de facto played by players born in or after 1988 for an event usually played by U-20 (Four Nations Tournament), but all players were selected by U-21 coach Pierluigi Casiraghi to select junior member to the final round of 2009 U-21 Euro, which the age limit in fact was born in 1986 or after. Fiorillo was not included in the final squad of 2009 U-21 Euro but Andrea Seculin (who made U-21 debut on the same day) did, as Seculin did not go to the FIFA U-20 World Cup.

Fiorillo was the first choice keeper in the first round of 2009 UEFA European Under-21 Football Championship qualification. Coach Casiraghi later picked Seculin as first choice. Since November 2009 he did not receive any U-21 call-up. Fiorillo also failed to receive any call-up from Italy U-20 team until June 2011 for the last round of 2010–11 Four Nations Tournament. In 2011–12 season, he was capped for another feeder team of U-21, the Italy U-21 Serie B twice.

== Career statistics ==
As of match played 13 May 2025

Appearances and goals by club, season and competition
Club	Season	League			National cup		Europe		Other		Total	
Club	Season	Division	Apps	Goals	Apps	Goals	Apps	Goals	Apps	Goals	Apps	Goals
Sampdoria	2006–07	Serie A	0	0	—		—		—		0	0
Sampdoria	2007–08	Serie A	1	0	0	0	0	0	—		1	0
Sampdoria	2008–09	Serie A	2	0	0	0	0	0	—		2	0
Sampdoria	2009–10	Serie A	1	0	1	0	—		—		2	0
Sampdoria	2010–11	Serie A	0	0	0	0	0	0	—		0	0
Sampdoria	2011–12	Serie B	0	0	0	0	—		0	0	0	0
Sampdoria	2013–14	Serie A	5	0	2	0	—		—		7	0
Sampdoria	Total		9	0	3	0	0	0	—		12	0
Reggina (loan)	2009–10	Serie B	5	0	—		—		—		5	0
Spezia (loan)	2010–11	Lego Pro 1D	8	0	—		—		—		8	0
Livorno (loan)	2012–13	Serie B	28	0	1	0	—		0	0	29	0
Pescara (loan)	2014–15	Serie B	26	0	2	0	—		5	0	33	0
Pescara (loan)	2015–16	Serie B	33	0	2	0	—		4	0	39	0
Pescara (loan)	Total		59	0	4	0	—		9	0	72	0
Pescara	2016–17	Serie A	9	0	1	0	—		—		10	0
Pescara	2017–18	Serie B	34	0	2	0	—		—		39	0
Pescara	2018–19	Serie B	32	0	2	0	—		2	0	39	0
Pescara	2019–20	Serie B	28	0	2	0	—		2	0	39	0
Pescara	2020–21	Serie B	38	0	0	0	—		—		39	0
Pescara	Total		141	0	7	0	—		4	0	152	0
Salernitana	2021–22	Serie A	1	0	1	0	—		—		2	0
Salernitana	2022–23	Serie A	1	0	0	0	—		—		1	0
Salernitana	2023–24	Serie A	4	0	1	0	—		—		5	0
Salernitana	2024–25	Serie B	5	0	1	0	—		—		6	0
Salernitana	Total		11	0	3	0	—		—		14	0
Carrarese (loan)	2024–25	Serie B	12	0	—		—		—		12	0
Career total			273	0	22	0	0	0	13	0	308	0
