= Andrea Grieco =

Italian footballer (born 1991)

Personal information
- Date of birth: 5 October 1991 (age 35)
- Place of birth: San Giovanni Rotondo, Italy
- Height: 1.86 m (6 ft 1 in)
- Position: Defender

Team information
- Current team: Aprilia

Youth career
- Guanzatese
- Como
- Sampdoria

Senior career*
Years	Team	Apps	(Gls)
2010–	Sampdoria	0	(0)
2011–2012	→ Viareggio (loan)	9	(0)
2012	→ Aprilia (loan)		

International career^{‡}
2007–2008	Italy U19	3	(0)
2009–2010	Italy U19	2	(0)
2011–	Italy U19	2	(0)
- * Club domestic league appearances and goals as of April 17, 2011 ‡ National team caps and goals as of April 17, 2011

Andrea Grieco (born 5 October 1991) is an Italian football player. He currently plays for Aprilia, on loan from U.C. Sampdoria. His preferred position is right-back.

Grieco made his debut for the club in the match against Debrecen.
