= Luca Castellazzi =

Italian footballer (born 1975)

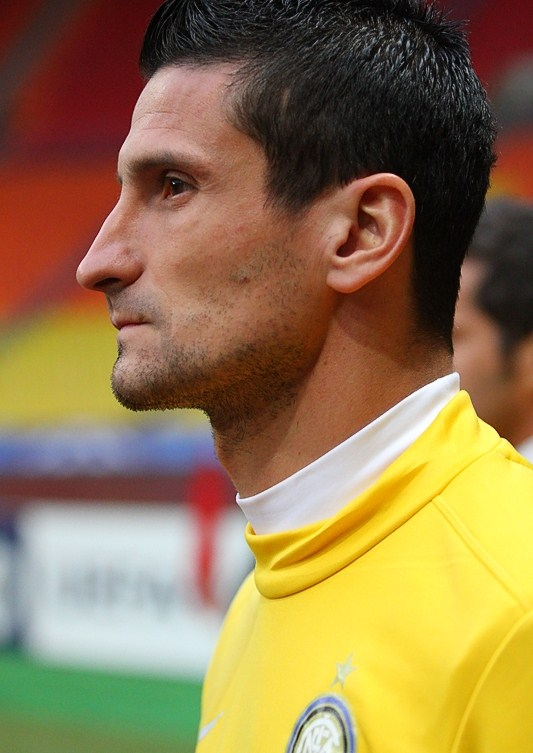
- Castellazzi with Inter Milan in 2011

Personal information
- Date of birth: 19 July 1975 (age 51)
- Place of birth: Gorgonzola, Italy
- Height: 1.92 m (6 ft 4 in)
- Position: Goalkeeper

Youth career
- 1992–1994: Monza

Senior career*
Years	Team	Apps	(Gls)
1994–1995	Varese	18	(0)
1995–1996	Monza	32	(0)
1996–1999	Padova	57	(0)
1999	→ Pescara (loan)	3	(0)
1999–2005	Brescia	106	(0)
2002–2003	→ Reggina (loan)	14	(0)
2003	→ Catania (loan)	18	(0)
2005–2010	Sampdoria	101	(0)
2010–2014	Inter Milan	24	(0)
2014–2016	Torino	0	(0)
Total		373	(0)

Managerial career
- 2016–2018: Torino (team manager)
- 2022–: AC Milan (goalkeeper coach–U17)
- * Club domestic league appearances and goals as of 16:57, 15 February 2016 (UTC)

Luca Castellazzi (born 19 July 1975) is an Italian former professional footballer who played as a goalkeeper. He serves as the goalkeeper coach of AC Milan young team under 17.

== Club career ==
=== Early career ===
Castellazzi began his career at Monza. He then spent time in Serie B, Serie C1 and Serie C2 with Padova and Pescara, before joining Brescia along with Vincenzo Mazzeo.

=== Brescia ===
Castellazzi followed Brescia promoted to Serie A in the summer of 2000. He made his Serie A debut on 21 January 2001, against Vicenza. In the 2001–02 season, he was first choice for the team but during the next season lost his place to Matteo Sereni. After being loaned to Reggina and Catania in the 2002–03 season, he finally became a regular starter again in the 2004–05 season, in which he played all 38 Serie A matches. Castellazzi initially the first choice of 2003–04 season, but lost his place to Federico Agliardi after matchday 4 and regained his place on matchday 23.

=== Sampdoria ===
After Brescia were relegated to Serie B in the summer of 2005, Castellazzi joined Sampdoria on a free transfer, signing a reported two-year contract. He received the number 1 shirt from Luigi Turci. The first season he was the backup of Francesco Antonioli, and Castellazzi only played the three matches which Antonioli missed.

In his second season, Castellazzi finally earned a regular place, and in January 2008, he signed a contract extension again which would run until summer 2010.

After the injury during 2009–10 season, Castellazzi lost his starting place to Marco Storari, and in February 2010, it was rumoured he had signed a pre-contract with Inter Milan.

In total, Castellazzi played 101 league matches for the Genoese side, while his understudies Antonio Mirante, Gianluca Berti and Carlo Zotti played 22 matches during 2007–08 to 2008–09 season, 11 matches and 1 match in 2006–07 respectively.

=== Inter Milan ===
On 17 June 2010, Castellazzi joined UEFA Champions League and Serie A champions Inter Milan on a free transfer, tying him to the club until 2012. He became one of the understudies to Júlio César along with Paolo Orlandoni and replaced the retired Francesco Toldo. During the 2010–11 season, Castellazzi played in all three major competitions – Serie A, Champions League and Coppa Italia – due to injuries afflicting the first-choice Júlio César.

On 11 May 2012, Castellazzi signed a new contract with Inter, keeping him at the club until 2014.

=== Torino ===
Castellazzi signed for Torino on a free transfer after completing his contract with Inter in 2014. He debuted for the Granata on 14 January 2015 in the Coppa Italia against Lazio, replacing Cristian Molinaro after the expulsion of Daniele Padelli.

Castellazzi signed a new deal with Torino in 2015, keeping him with the club until June 2016; once expired, he retired from football to become team manager of the club.

== Style of play ==
An experienced shot-stopper, Castellazzi was known for his professionalism and consistency as a goalkeeper, as well as his excellent reflexes and ability between the posts, which enabled him to produce spectacular and decisive saves. He was less effective and confident at coming off his line to deal with high balls, however. In his youth, he was considered to be a promising goalkeeper, and his main role-models were Luca Marchegiani and Walter Zenga.

== Honours ==
Inter Milan

- Supercoppa Italiana: 2010
- FIFA Club World Cup: 2010
- Coppa Italia: 2010–11
