= Daniele Mannini =

Italian footballer (born 1983)

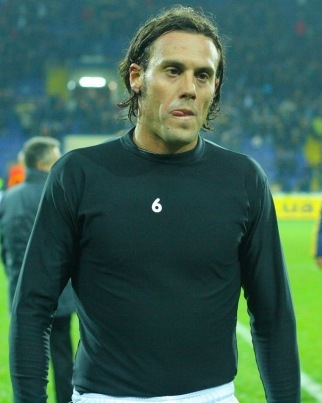

Personal information
- Date of birth: 25 October 1983 (age 43)
- Place of birth: Viareggio, Italy
- Height: 1.83 m (6 ft 0 in)
- Position: Winger

Team information
- Current team: Beverley Town

Youth career
- 2000–2001: Lucchese

Senior career*
Years	Team	Apps	(Gls)
2001–2003	Viareggio	33	(4)
2003–2004	Pisa	32	(4)
2004–2008	Brescia	118	(12)
2008–2009	Napoli	39	(2)
2009–2011	Sampdoria	66	(7)
2011–2014	Siena	32	(0)
2014	→ Pisa (loan)	11	(1)
2014–2015	Lecce	31	(1)
2015–2018	Pisa	94	(17)
2018–2020	Pontedera	51	(7)
2022–2023	Beverley Town	1	(0)
- * Club domestic league appearances and goals as of 22 July 2022

Daniele Mannini (born 25 October 1983) is an Italian footballer who plays as a winger. Appearing for clubs such as Pisa, Brescia, Napoli and Sampdoria over the course of a near two decade long professional career, he made over 150 appearances in Serie A, also playing for several seasons in Serie B and Serie C. Following his professional retirement in 2020 he moved to England, where he came out of retirement in July 2022 to play for Northern Counties East Football League Division One club Beverley Town.

== Career ==
=== Early career ===
Son of former ACF Fiorentina goalkeeper Alessandro Mannini, Daniele started his professional career at hometown club Viareggio, playing with them in the Italian Serie C2 and Serie D tiers.

=== Pisa ===
In summer 2003, he joined Pisa of Serie C1.

=== Brescia ===
In 2004–05 season he joined Serie A club Brescia. On 12 September 2004, he made his Serie A debut against Juventus. He stayed with Brescia after they were relegated to Serie B in summer 2005, and played with them until 31 January 2008.

=== Napoli ===
He left for Serie A club Napoli on 31 January 2008, joining fellow Brescia players Santacroce and Hamsik, for a total fee of €18 million within a season. Mannini himself was tagged for €7 million. In January 2009 he was handed a one-year suspension by the Court of Arbitration for Sport (CAS) along with former teammate Davide Possanzini from WADA for being late for a drugs test following a Serie B match between Brescia and Chievo in December 2007. Later the ban was frozen by CAS due to appeal process., The ban was cancelled on 27 July 2009 after being proved there was no real intention to avoid the controls from Possanzini and Mannini.

=== Sampdoria ===
In July 2009, Mannini joined Sampdoria in co-ownership bid, for €3.5 million (€7 million divided half). On the same day Hugo Campagnaro joined Napoli for €7 million.

Mannini made an excellent start in his first season at Sampdoria, scoring 5 goals in Serie A and 3 assists in just 8 games.

At the end of 2010–11 Serie A, Doria was relegated. The club gave up the co-ownership and allowed players to return to their mother clubs for a peppercorn fee of €500 each, such as keeper Gianluca Curci and winger Stefano Guberti. However the co-ownership of Mannini was not resolved before the deadline on 24 June. Thus, both clubs had to submit a bid in a sealed envelope to Lega Serie A in order to decide the highest bidder, which was only €500. on the other hand, Sampdoria abstain entirely from making an offer.

=== Siena ===
On 6 August 2011, Mannini moved to newly promoted Serie A club Siena in another co-ownership deal for €450,000 (plus €200,000 other fee) in a 4-year contract. In June 2013 Siena acquired Mannini outright for free after the club was relegated. Both clubs failed to form any deal before the deadline, but Napoli did not submit a bid.

==== Pisa (loan) ====
On 31 January 2014 he was signed by the third-level club Pisa in a temporary deal. He was released after Siena failed to register for 2014–15 Serie B.

=== Lecce ===
On 1 September 2014 he was signed by US Lecce.

=== Return to Pisa ===
Mannini was re-signed by Pisa on 27 August 2015.

=== Pontedera ===
On 15 January 2020, his contract with Pontedera was terminated by mutual consent.

=== Beverley Town ===
Having been released by Pontedera, Mannini elected to retire from football, and moved to East Yorkshire to work as a sales executive for a food company. During a chance encounter while they were both out walking dogs, Mannini met Mark Smith, the chairman of Beverley Town, a local team preparing for their first ever season in Division One of the Northern Counties East Football League, which saw Smith invite Mannini to pre-season training. On 22 July 2022, Beverley Town announced that Mannini had joined them for the upcoming season.
