= Salvatore Foti =

Italian football coach and former player (born 1988)

Personal information
- Full name: Salvatore Foti
- Date of birth: 8 August 1988 (age 38)
- Place of birth: Palermo, Italy
- Height: 1.92 m (6 ft 4 in)
- Position: Forward

Team information
- Current team: Acireale (manager)

Youth career
- Acireale
- Atletico Catania
- –2005: Venezia

Senior career*
Years	Team	Apps	(Gls)
2005–2012	Sampdoria	19	(2)
2007	→ Vicenza (loan)	23	(6)
2008	→ Messina (loan)	17	(2)
2008–2009	→ Treviso (loan)	19	(1)
2010	→ Piacenza (loan)	18	(3)
2010–2011	→ Empoli (loan)	17	(3)
2012	→ Brescia (loan)	6	(0)
2012–2013	Lecce	15	(8)
2014–2015	Chiasso	0	(0)
2014–2015	→ Balerna (loan)	0	(0)
Total		134	(25)

International career
2003	Italy U15	4	(1)
2003–2004	Italy U16	9	(4)
2004–2005	Italy U17	14	(4)
2007–2008	Italy U20	3	(1)

Managerial career
- 2026–: Acireale
- * Club domestic league appearances and goals

Salvatore Foti (born 8 August 1988) is an Italian football coach and former professional player who is the head coach of club Acireale.

He played as a forward, making 15 Serie A appearances and scoring once in the league for Sampdoria, and then spending most of his career in Serie B, totalling 104 games and 16 goals for seven clubs. He was also a youth international for Italy.

After retiring at age 27 following unsuccessful back surgery, he worked as a coach for several teams.

== Club career ==
=== Early career ===
Foti was born in Palermo, Sicily, as the son of an amateur footballer who chose a career in banking over the opportunity to be a professional player. He played at Acireale and Atletico Catania on his native island before moving to Venezia.

=== Sampdoria ===
After playing for Italy under-17 at their hosting of the 2005 UEFA European Championship, Foti joined Sampdoria, managed by Walter Novellino. He made his professional debut on 8 December 2005 in the last 16 first leg of the Coppa Italia away to Cagliari, coming on as a 47th-minute substitute for Andrea Gasbarroni in a 1–1 draw; his Serie A debut was a month later, three minutes in a 2–0 home loss to Livorno. On his first start on 12 February 2006, he scored his only top-flight goal at the end of a 4–2 win over Messina at the Stadio Luigi Ferraris; eleven days earlier he had scored his first goal in the cup, a 2–2 home draw with Udinese in the quarter-final second leg as the opponents advanced on the away goals rule. He was compared to Zlatan Ibrahimović, then of Juventus, for his height and ball skills.

Foti was sold to Udinese in summer 2006 in a co-ownership deal for €2 million. At the same time Sampdoria acquired Fabio Quagliarella and Mirko Pieri for €1.5M and €0.5M respectively in co-ownership deal. He was loaned back to Sampdoria for the first half of the 2006–07 season, and then to Serie B's Vicenza for the second half in order to give him the opportunity to play more first team football.

Foti started the 2007–08 season again with Sampdoria; on 21 July he made his only European appearance of his career in the dying seconds of a 1–0 win at Cherno More of Bulgaria in the UEFA Intertoto Cup third round first leg. He mostly featured as a backup player, being later loaned to another Serie B club, this time Messina. In the summer of 2008, he was loaned to Treviso for the entire 2008–09 season. He returned to Sampdoria in June 2009 for free, and then spent 1 1/2 seasons at Serie B teams Piacenza and Empoli. In January 2012 he was loaned to again to another Serie B team Brescia, while Juan Antonio joined Sampdoria definitely.

=== Later career ===
In the summer of 2012, Foti joined Lega Pro Prima Divisione side Lecce following their relegation from Serie A and subsequent expulsion from Serie B. On his debut, he scored the opening goal and created the second for Cosimo Chiricò in a 2–0 win over San Marino, and scored his second goal a week later in a 3–1 win against Treviso. After scoring again in a 2–2 against Como, he made his first start for the club at home to Virtus Entella, and scored a hat trick, taking his tally to six goals from just one start and four substitute appearances.

A free agent for the entire summer of 2013, Foti decided to have surgery in October that year on a herniated vertebra. The operation was unsuccessful, leaving him unable to train or even play with his daughter, and he pursued legal action. In July 2014, he signed a two-year contract for Swiss Challenge League team Chiasso, managed by compatriot Gianluca Zambrotta. Due to his physical condition, he made no appearances, nor did he while on loan at Balerna, a lower division club. He retired in January 2016, aged 27.

== International career ==
Foti played all five matches of 2005 UEFA European Under-17 Football Championship. He also played seven friendlies for the U17 team and twice in 2005 FIFA U-17 World Championship.

== Coaching career ==
In December 2015, shortly before retiring as a player, Foti obtained a UEFA B licence. From 2016, he was part of Marco Giampaolo's coaching staff at Sampdoria, Milan and Torino.

On 2 January 2022, Foti was hired as assistant manager to José Mourinho at Roma, after the exit of João Sacramento. With the Portuguese manager suspended, Foti led Roma on 27 February in a 1–0 win at Spezia with an added-time penalty by Tammy Abraham, followed six days later by a home win by the same margin against Atalanta. In the 2022–23 season, he oversaw Roma's 2–1 away win over Internazionale, their 1–0 home win against Bologna and their 2–2 draw against AC Milan at the San Siro. On 5 March 2023, he oversaw a 1–0 win at the Stadio Olimpico against Juventus to remain unbeaten in his six games.

Foti received a one-month suspension for his actions in a 2–1 home loss to Cremonese in the Coppa Italia quarter-finals for threats and insults against visiting coaches and match officials. He left Roma following Mourinho's sacking in January 2024.

In June 2024, Foti agreed to follow Mourinho as his assistant at Fenerbahçe.

On 19 October 2025, after a few months without a job, Foti was announced as Angelo Gregucci's new assistant coach at struggling Serie B club Sampdoria. On 9 March 2026, following a 3–0 loss to Frosinone, both Foti and Gregucci were dismissed from their respective roles with immediate effect.

On 31 July 2026, Foti was appointed head coach of Acireale, the Eccellenza club where he had come through as a player.
