= Daniele Messina =

Italian footballer (born 1992)

Personal information
- Date of birth: 19 March 1992 (age 34)
- Place of birth: Adrano, Italy
- Position: Defender

Team information
- Current team: Calcio Biancavilla

Youth career
- Adrano
- 2008–2011: Sampdoria

Senior career*
Years	Team	Apps	(Gls)
2007–2008	Adrano	5	(?)
2008–2013	Sampdoria	0	(0)
2011–2012	→ Foligno (loan)	4	(0)
2012	→ Sambonifacese (loan)	4	(0)
2012–2013	→ Gavorrano (loan)	5	(0)
2013	→ HinterReggio (loan)	10	(0)
2014	Vittoriosa Stars		
2014	Orlandina	7	(0)
2014–2015	Leonfortese	9	(0)
2015	Siracusa	0	(0)
2015–2016	Nuorese	31	(0)
2016	Pro Sesto	6	(0)
2016–2017	Fiorenzuola	17	(6)
2017–2018	Matelica	27	(2)
2018–2019	Monterosi FC	33	(0)
2019–2019	Calcio Biancavilla	2	(0)
- * Club domestic league appearances and goals as of 12:53, 20 November 2019 (UTC)

Daniele Messina (born 19 March 1992) is an Italian professional footballer who plays for Serie D club Calcio Biancavilla.

== Biography ==
=== Adrano ===
Messina started his career at Adrano.

=== Sampdoria ===
He joined U.C. Sampdoria in 2008 from Adrano initially on a temporary deal. In 2009, he joined the Genoese club outright, for €40,000 on a four-year contract. He made his debut for Samp in a UEFA Europa League match against Debrecen on 26 January 2011.

=== Serie C loans ===
Messina left for Foligno in July 2011. In January 2012 he was signed by Sambonifacese. In July 2012 he joined Gavorrano. On 31 January 2013, he was signed by HinterReggio.

=== Malta ===
Circa February 2014 Messina joined Maltese club Vittoriosa Stars on free transfer.

=== Biancavilla ===
On 14 July 2019, Messina signed with Serie D club Calcio Biancavilla.

== Career statistics ==
As of 16 December 2010

Club	Season	League			Coppa Italia		Europe		Total	
Club	Season	Division	Apps	Goals	Apps	Goals	Apps	Goals	Apps	Goals
Sampdoria	2010–11	Serie A	0	0	0	0	1	0	1	0
Career total			0	0	0	0	1	0	1	0
