= Marco Storari =

Italian footballer (born 1977)

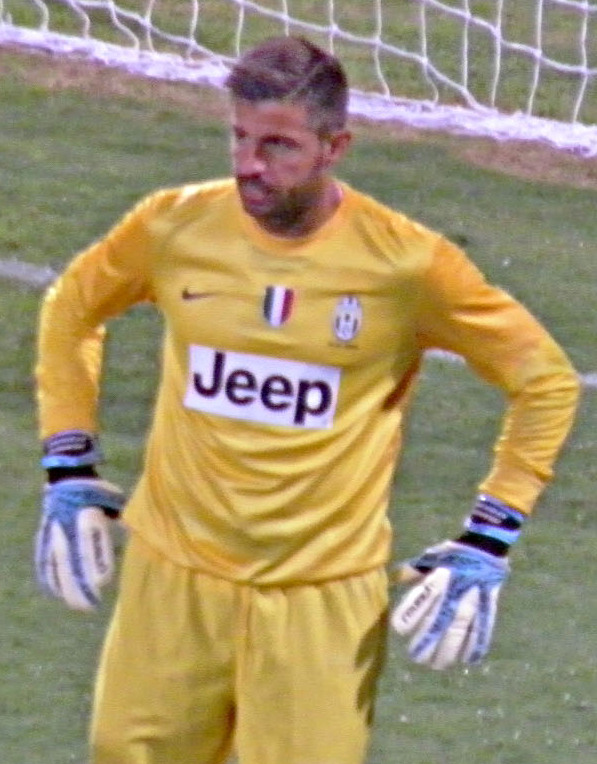
- Storari playing for Juventus in 2012

Personal information
- Date of birth: 7 January 1977 (age 49)
- Place of birth: Pisa, Italy
- Height: 1.87 m (6 ft 2 in)
- Position: Goalkeeper

Youth career
- 1995–1998: Perugia
- 1998: Montevarchi

Senior career*
Years	Team	Apps	(Gls)
1998–2002	Ancona	91	(0)
2002–2003	Napoli	4	(0)
2002–2003	→ Messina (loan)	16	(0)
2003–2007	Messina	127	(0)
2007–2010	Milan	10	(0)
2007–2008	→ Levante (loan)	17	(0)
2008	→ Cagliari (loan)	20	(0)
2008–2009	→ Fiorentina (loan)	1	(0)
2010	→ Sampdoria (loan)	19	(0)
2010–2015	Juventus	43	(0)
2015–2017	Cagliari	56	(0)
2017–2018	Milan	0	(0)
Total		404	(0)
- * Club domestic league appearances and goals as of 30 June 2018

Marco Storari (born 7 January 1977) is an Italian former footballer who played as a goalkeeper.

After a lengthy spell in Italy's lower leagues, he arrived in Serie A aged 27. Steady performances for Messina prompted his signing by A.C. Milan in 2007; during his time at the Milanese club, Storari had loan spells with several other Italian sides, as well as Spanish club Levante. He later joined Juventus in 2010, where he mainly served as a back-up to Gianluigi Buffon, winning four consecutive Serie A titles with the club as well as the Coppa Italia. He later returned to Cagliari, where he spent a season and a half, helping the team win the 2015–16 Serie B title and earn promotion to Serie A. He returned to Milan in January 2017, where he spent another season and a half as the club's reserve goalkeeper before retiring in the summer of 2018.

== Club career ==
=== Early years / Messina ===
Born in Pisa, Storari finished his football formation at Perugia and Montevarchi (six months), making his professional debuts with Ancona, in the third division. With the latter, he helped to promotion to Serie B in 2000.

After two seasons, Storari left for Napoli which was also then in the second level, in a joint-ownership deal. He continued to play in that category subsequently, joining Messina on loan in January 2002 in exchange for Emanuele Manitta, with the deal being made permanent in summer 2003; Messina promoted at the end of the 2003–04 campaign, with him as an undisputed starter.

Storari made his Serie A debut on 12 September 2004 in a 0–0 away draw against Parma, as the newcomer club went on to finish in seventh place. In the following seasons he remained the starter, as Messina nearly relegated in 2005–06 after only being reinstated after the outcome of the 2006 Italian football scandal, but eventually dropping down a level the following year, as last.

=== Milan ===
On 17 January 2007, Storari was acquired by A.C. Milan for €1.2 million, signing a 2 1/2-year contract as an emergency signing as both Dida and backup Željko Kalac were out of action due to injury. In three league appearances, against Livorno, Siena and Udinese, he conceded seven goals.

On 3 July 2007, reports surfaced that Milan were close to sending Storari to La Liga side Real Betis, on a one-year loan. The deal was increased to two years and the player, along with his manager, traveled to Seville. Although having stayed in the city for three days, Betis president Manuel Ruiz de Lopera failed to meet with the player and Storari returned to Italy as the transfer failed to materialize; on 12 August he was eventually loaned to another club in Spain, Levante, on a two-year contract.

However, the loan deal ended after only six months, as the Valencian team was immerse in a deep financial crisis; on 5 January 2008 Storari returned to Italy, with Cagliari due to Levante's inability to pay his salary. "[The] club was in financial difficulty and couldn’t pay me...there are some wonderful people here who were honest with us, but working without pay is a difficult situation to be in".

Storari signed a loan contract for Fiorentina in July 2008. His output consisted of a Coppa Italia match and another in the league, barred by longtime first-choice Sébastien Frey.

Due to an injury to starter Christian Abbiati, Storari began 2009–10 as first-choice, over Dida. On 22 August 2009, two years and three months after his last official match for the club, he was between the posts for the 2–1 win at Siena; additionally, in October, he signed a new contract, adding two extra years to his existing one, but suffered an injury afterwards, losing his place to the Brazilian.

After the recovery of Abbiati, Storari faced additional competition for a regular starting berth. Thus, on 15 January 2010, he went on loan to Sampdoria, replacing injured Luca Castellazzi; he played his first game two days later, in a 1–1 home draw against Catania.

=== Juventus ===
After Sampdoria failed to agree a deal with Milan to sign him outright, after losing Castellazzi to Inter Milan on a free transfer, Storari was sold to Juventus from Milan for a fee of €4.5 million on 23 June 2010, becoming the second signing of head coach Luigi Delneri and sports director Giuseppe Marotta, with whom he already had worked at Sampdoria. He signed a three-year contract effective on 1 July, providing cover for Gianluigi Buffon who sustained a back injury at the 2010 FIFA World Cup, and competed for a starting spot with Alex Manninger; Milan signed Marco Amelia on loan from Genoa on the same day, to act as his replacement.

After the recovery of Buffon, Storari became second-choice again. Despite the backup role he did not leave the Vecchia Signora in the summer of 2011 to play more often, and instead extended his contract until 30 June 2014 in November.

On 16 May 2015, as Juventus had already been crowned league champions for the fourth straight time, Storari started against Inter in order to rest Buffon for the 2015 UEFA Champions League Final. In the last five minutes of play, he made a double save on Rodrigo Palacio first and then Mauro Icardi to keep his team's 2–1 lead and secure the away win. Additionally, he appeared in five matches in the Italian Cup, including the 2–1 final win over Lazio.

=== Return to Cagliari ===
On 3 July 2015, Storari signed with Cagliari on a two-year contract, returning to the club after a seven-year absence. In his first season in his second spell he only missed one league in 42, helping to obtain top flight promotion after one year.

=== Return to Milan ===
On 10 January 2017, 40-year-old Storari re-joined his former team Milan on an initial six-month deal. In June, he extended his contract until the end of 2017–18 season. After his contract with the club expired at the end of the season, Storari became a free agent in the summer of 2018, after which he subsequently retired from professional football.

== International career ==
Storari was never capped for Italy, although he was selected as third-choice by national boss Marcello Lippi for a 2006 FIFA World Cup qualifier against Slovenia in October 2005.

== Style of play ==
Storari was known for his consistent shot-stopping and good reactions, as well as his leadership behind the back-line; he was also adept at stopping penalties.

== Personal life ==
Storari and his wife Veronica had two sons, Tommaso (b. 2010) and Piergiorgio (2011).

== Career statistics ==
=== Club ===
Appearances and goals by club, season and competition
Club	Season	League			National cup (Note: Includes Coppa Italia)		Europe		Other		Total	
Club	Season	Division	Apps	Goals	Apps	Goals	Apps	Goals	Apps	Goals	Apps	Goals
Ancona	1998–99	Serie C1	0	0	0	0	—		—		0	0
Ancona	1999–2000	Serie C1	33	0	0	0	—		3 (Note: Appearances in Serie C1 play-offs)	0	36	0
Ancona	2000–01	Serie B	36	0	3	0	—		—		39	0
Ancona	2001–02	Serie B	22	0	3	0	—		—		25	0
Ancona	Total		91	0	6	0	—		3	0	100	0
Napoli	2002–03	Serie B	4	0	0	0	—		—		4	0
Messina	2002–03	Serie B	16	0	0	0	—		—		16	0
Messina	2003–04	Serie B	45	0	1	0	—		—		46	0
Messina	2004–05	Serie A	28	0	2	0	—		—		30	0
Messina	2005–06	Serie A	35	0	0	0	—		—		35	0
Messina	2006–07	Serie A	19	0	3	0	—		—		22	0
Messina	Total		143	0	6	0	—		—		149	0
Milan	2006–07	Serie A	3	0	0	0	0	0	—		3	0
Milan	2009–10	Serie A	7	0	1	0	2 (Note: Appearances in UEFA Champions League)	0	—		10	0
Milan	Total		10	0	1	0	2	0	—		13	0
Levante (loan)	2007–08	La Liga	17	0	0	0	—		—		17	0
Cagliari (loan)	2007–08	Serie A	20	0	1	0	—		—		21	0
Fiorentina (loan)	2008–09	Serie A	1	0	1	0	0	0	—		2	0
Sampdoria (loan)	2009–10	Serie A	19	0	0	0	—		—		19	0
Juventus	2010–11	Serie A	23	0	1	0	5 (Note: Appearances in UEFA Europa League)	0	—		29	0
Juventus	2011–12	Serie A	3	0	5	0	—		—		8	0
Juventus	2012–13	Serie A	6	0	3	0	0	0	0	0	5	0
Juventus	2013–14	Serie A	6	0	2	0	0	0	0	0	8	0
Juventus	2014–15	Serie A	5	0	5	0	0	0	0	0	10	0
Juventus	Total		43	0	16	0	5	0	0	0	64	0
Cagliari	2015–16	Serie B	41	0	2	0	—		—		43	0
Cagliari	2016–17	Serie A	15	0	1	0	—		—		16	0
Cagliari	Total		56	0	3	0	—		—		59	0
Milan	2016–17	Serie A	0	0	0	0	—		—		0	0
Milan	2017–18	Serie A	0	0	0	0	2	0	—		2	0
Milan	Total		0	0	0	0	2	0	—		2	0
Career total			404	0	34	0	9	0	3	0	450	0

== Honours ==
Juventus

- Serie A: 2011–12, 2012–13, 2013–14, 2014–15
- Supercoppa Italiana: 2012, 2013; Runner-up 2014
- Coppa Italia: 2014–15; Runner-up 2011–12
- UEFA Champions League: Runner-up 2014–15

Cagliari

- Serie B: 2015–16

=== Individual ===
The Guardian Serie A Team of the Season: 2009–10
