= 2008–09 ACF Fiorentina season =

Fiorentina
2008–09 season
- President: Andrea Della Valle
- Manager: Cesare Prandelli
- Stadium: Stadio Artemio Franchi
- Serie A: 4th
- Coppa Italia: Round of 16
- UEFA Champions League: Group stage
- UEFA Cup: Round of 32
- Top goalscorer: League: Alberto Gilardino (19); All: Alberto Gilardino (25)
- Highest home attendance: 41,839 vs Milan (31 May 2009, Serie A)
- Lowest home attendance: 19,018 vs Ajax (19 February 2009, UEFA Cup)
- Average home league attendance: 31,200
Home colours	Away colours	Third colours

The 2008–09 season was ACF Fiorentina's 83rd season in Italian football and their 71st season in the first-tier of Italian football, Serie A. Having finished fourth the previous season, La Viola earned qualification to the UEFA Champions League for the first time in eight years.

== Players ==
=== Squad information ===
As of 26 July 2008 Note: Flags indicate national team as defined under FIFA eligibility rules; some limited exceptions apply. Players may hold more than one non-FIFA nationality.

No.	Pos.	Nation	Player
1	GK	FRA	Sébastien Frey
2	DF	DEN	Per Krøldrup
3	DF	ITA	Dario Dainelli (captain)
4	MF	ITA	Marco Donadel
5	DF	ITA	Alessandro Gamberini
6	DF	PER	Juan Manuel Vargas
7	MF	ITA	Franco Semioli
8	FW	MNE	Stevan Jovetić
10	FW	ROU	Adrian Mutu
11	FW	ITA	Alberto Gilardino
13	GK	ITA	Marco Storari
14	DF	ITA	Luciano Zauri
15	DF	CZE	Ondřej Mazuch
18	MF	ITA	Riccardo Montolivo
19	MF	ITA	Massimo Gobbi
20	MF	DEN	Martin Jørgensen

No.	Pos.	Nation	Player
21	DF	ITA	Gianluca Comotto
22	MF	SRB	Zdravko Kuzmanović
23	DF	ITA	Manuel Pasqual
24	MF	ARG	Mario Santana
25	GK	SRB	Vlada Avramov
26	DF	BRA	Alex
28	FW	BRA	Jefferson
30	MF	ARG	Sergio Almirón
32	FW	ITA	Emiliano Bonazzoli
33	GK	ITA	Andrea Seculin
35	MF	SEN	Pape Moussa Diakhatè
38	MF	ITA	Lorenzo Morelli
41	DF	ITA	Massimiliano Tagliani
44	DF	ITA	Federico Masi
46	FW	ITA	Piergiuseppe Maritato
88	MF	BRA	Felipe Melo

== Transfers ==
=== In ===
Summer transfer window

No.	Pos.	Player	From	Fee
88	MF	(Brazil) Felipe Melo	Almería	€13 million
46	FW	(Italy) Piergiuseppe Maritato	Juventus	undisclosed
11	FW	(Italy) Alberto Gilardino	Milan	€14 million
8	FW	(Montenegro) Stevan Jovetić	Partizan	€8 million
34	MF	(Serbia) Nikola Gulan	Sampdoria	undisclosed
28	FW	(Brazil) Jefferson	Paraná	free transfer
21	DF	(Italy) Gianluca Comotto	Torino	€4.3 million
6	DF	(Peru) Juan Manuel Vargas	Catania	€11 million
13	GK	(Italy) Marco Storari	Milan	on loan
14	DF	(Italy) Luciano Zauri	Lazio	on loan
30	MF	(Argentina) Sergio Almirón	Juventus	on loan

Winter transfer window

No.	Pos.	Player	From	Fee
32	FW	(Italy) Emiliano Bonazzoli	Sampdoria	on loan
--	MF	(Italy) Davide Carcuro	Treviso	loan return (co-ownership)
--	GK	(Italy) Tommaso Scuffia	Maceratese	undisclosed

=== Out ===
Summer transfer window

No.	Pos.	Player	To	Fee
11	MF	(Italy) Fabio Liverani	Palermo	free transfer
32	FW	(Italy) Christian Vieri	Atalanta	free transfer
99	FW	(Italy) Daniele Cacia	Piacenza	blind auction
6	DF	(Italy) Alessandro Potenza	Genoa	undisclosed
21	FW	(Czech Republic) Tomáš Ujfaluši	Atlético Madrid	free transfer
--	MF	(Brazil) Guilherme	N/A	released
12	GK	(Italy) Cristiano Lupatelli	N/A	released

Winter transfer window

No.	Pos.	Player	From	Fee
29	FW	(Italy) Giampaolo Pazzini	Sampdoria	€10 million
9	FW	(Italy) Dani Osvaldo	Bologna	€7 million

=== On loan ===
No.	Pos.	Player	On loan to	Until
27	FW	(Italy) Samuel Di Carmine	Queens Park Rangers	June 2009
14	FW	(Italy) Arturo Lupoli	Norwich City	June 2009
16	MF	(Czech Republic) Jan Hable	Baník Ostrava	June 2009
17	FW	(Senegal) Papa Waigo	Lecce	June 2009
34	FW	(France) Matthias Lepiller	Eupen	June 2009
54	MF	(Portugal) Manuel da Costa	Sampdoria	June 2009
34	MF	(Serbia) Nikola Gulan	1860 Munich	June 2009

== Pre-season and friendlies ==
17 July 2008 Friendly	Sciliar	0–12	Fiorentina	Schlern, Italy
		Report	Santana 9', 23'; Da Costa 21', 74'; Osvaldo 21'; Pazzini 27', 30', 32'; Gilardino 48'; Semioli 54', 67'; Jovetić 78' (pen.)	Stadium: Centro Sportivo Laranza

20 July 2007 Friendly	Hellas Verona	1–1	Fiorentina	Bolzano, Italy
	Castellan 73'	Report	Gilardino 5'	Stadium: Stadio Marco Druso; Referee: Dino Tommasi

26 July 2008 Friendly	Figline	0–1	Fiorentina	Figline Valdarno, Italy
		Report	Osvaldo 18'	Stadium: Stadio Goffredo Del Buffa

30 July 2008 Friendly	Fiorentina	1–3	(Spain) Barcelona	Florence, Italy
20:45 CEST (UTC+02:00)	Pazzini 69'	Report	Puyol 29'; Jeffrén 48'; Bojan 72'	Stadium: Stadio Artemio Franchi; Referee: Massimiliano Saccani

6 August 2008 Friendly	Fiorentina	3–1	(Romania) Progresul București	Florence, Italy
	Kuzmanović 3'; Gilardino 50'; Pazzini 69'	Report	Costescu 12'	Stadium: Stadio Artemio Franchi

19 August 2008 Friendly	Amici del Forte	2–6	Fiorentina	Forte dei Marmi, Italy
	Nappi 26', 70'	Report	Osvaldo 4', 14'; Kuzmanović 9', 51'; Pazzini 14', 52'

22 August 2008 Friendly	AZ (Netherlands)	0–2	Fiorentina	Alkmaar, Netherlands
		Report	Pazzini 23', 87'	Stadium: DSB Stadion; Attendance: 11,000; Referee: Peter Wink

== Competitions ==
=== Overall ===
Competition	Started round	Current position	Final position	First match	Last match
Serie A	Matchday 1	—	4th	31 August 2008	31 May 2009
Coppa Italia	Round of 16	—	Round of 16	17 December 2008	
Champions League	Third qualifying round	—	Group stage	12 August 2008	10 December 2008
UEFA Cup	Round of 32	—	Round of 32	19 February 2009	26 February 2009

Last updated: 31 May 2009

=== Serie A ===
==== League table ====
Pos	Team	Pld	W	D	L	GF	GA	GD	Pts	Qualification or relegation
2	Juventus	38	21	11	6	69	37	+32	74 (Note: Juventus finished ahead of Milan on head-to-head points: Juventus 4–2 Milan, Milan 1–1 Juventus.)	Qualification to Champions League group stage
3	Milan	38	22	8	8	70	35	+35	74	Qualification to Champions League group stage
4	Fiorentina	38	21	5	12	53	38	+15	68 (Note: Fiorentina finished ahead of Genoa on head-to-head points: Fiorentina 1–0 Genoa, Genoa 3–3 Fiorentina.)	Qualification to Champions League play-off round
5	Genoa	38	19	11	8	56	39	+17	68	Qualification to Europa League play-off round (Note: Lazio qualified for the play-off round of the 2009–10 UEFA Europa League by winning the 2008–09 Coppa Italia.)
6	Roma	38	18	9	11	64	61	+3	63	Qualification to Europa League third qualifying round

Source: lega-calcio.it (in Italian)
Rules for classification: 1) points; 2) head-to-head points; 3) head-to-head goal difference; 4) head-to-head goals scored; 5) goal difference; 6) number of goals scored.

==== Results summary ====
Overall								Home						Away					
Pld	W	D	L	GF	GA	GD	Pts	W	D	L	GF	GA	GD	W	D	L	GF	GA	GD
38	21	5	12	53	38	+15	68	14	2	3	29	14	+15	7	3	9	24	24	0

Last updated: 31 May 2009.
Source: Competitive matches

==== Results by round ====
Round	1	2	3	4	5	6	7	8	9	10	11	12	13	14	15	16	17	18	19	20	21	22	23	24	25	26	27	28	29	30	31	32	33	34	35	36	37	38
Ground	H	A	H	A	H	A	H	A	H	A	H	A	H	A	A	H	A	H	A	A	H	A	H	A	H	A	H	A	H	A	H	A	H	H	A	H	A	H
Result	D	L	W	L	W	W	W	W	D	L	W	L	W	L	W	W	W	L	L	L	W	W	W	D	W	D	L	L	W	W	W	L	W	W	W	W	D	L
Position	8	15	12	16	12	9	7	5	5	8	8	9	6	6	5	5	4	6	6	7	6	5	4	4	4	4	4	4	4	4	4	4	4	4	4	4	4	4

Updated to match(es) played on 31 May 2009. Source: Competitive matches
A = Away; H = Home; W = Win; D = Draw; L = Loss

==== Matches ====
31 August 2008 1	Fiorentina	1–1	Juventus	Florence
20:30 CEST (UTC+02:00)	Melo (yellow card) 33' (yellow-red card) 83'; Gilardino 89', (yellow card) 90'	Report	Grygera (yellow card) 23'; Nedvěd (yellow card) 28', (goal) 39'; Camoranesi (yellow card) 64'; Legrottaglie (yellow card) 83'	Stadium: Stadio Artemio Franchi; Attendance: 40,560; Referee: Emidio Morganti

14 September 2008 2	Napoli	2–1	Fiorentina	Naples
15:00 CEST (UTC+02:00)	Cannavaro (yellow card) 20'; Blasi (yellow card) 27'; Hamšík 49'; Aronica (yellow card) 66'; Maggio 70'	Report	Montolivo (yellow card) 27'; Mutu 40'; Zauri (yellow card) 45+1'; Donadel (yellow card) 83'	Stadium: Stadio San Paolo; Attendance: 26,553; Referee: Paolo Tagliavento

21 September 2008 3	Fiorentina	1–0	Bologna	Florence
15:00 CEST (UTC+02:00)	Jørgensen (yellow card) 32'; Gilardino 36'; Pazzini (yellow card) 81'; Jovetić (yellow card) 84'	Report	Di Vaio (yellow card) 79'	Stadium: Stadio Artemio Franchi; Attendance: 24,645; Referee: Antonio Damato

24 September 2008 4	Lazio	3–0	Fiorentina	Rome
20:30 CEST (UTC+02:00)	Mauri 51'; Pandev (yellow card) 53', (goal) 55'; Siviglia 59'; Radu (yellow card) 90+1'	Report	Zauri (yellow card) 20'; Melo (yellow card) 75'; Pazzini (yellow card) 90+1'	Stadium: Stadio Olimpico; Attendance: 32,500; Referee: Andrea De Marco

27 September 2008 5	Fiorentina	1–0	Genoa	Florence
20:30 CEST (UTC+02:00)	Donadel (yellow card) 20'; Gilardino (yellow card) 50', (goal) 61'; Dainelli (yellow card) 53'; Montolivo (yellow card) 79'; Osvaldo (yellow card) 90'	Report	Milanetto (yellow card) 22'; Bocchetti (yellow card) 27'; Papastathopoulos (yellow card) 77'; Olivera (yellow card) 89'	Stadium: Stadio Artemio Franchi; Attendance: 29,930; Referee: Roberto Rosetti

5 October 2008 6	Chievo	0–2	Fiorentina	Verona
15:00 CEST (UTC+02:00)	Scardina (red card) 38'; Langella (yellow card) 42'; Marcolini (yellow card) 45'; Italiano (yellow card) 60'	Report	Gamberini (yellow card) 22'; Kuzmanović 32'; Comotto (yellow card) 53'; Gilardino 73'	Stadium: Stadio Marc'Antonio Bentegodi; Attendance: 12,273; Referee: Luca Banti

18 October 2008 7	Fiorentina	3–0	Reggina	Florence
18:00 CEST (UTC+02:00)	Pazzini 40' (pen.); Comotto (yellow card) 41'; Gilardino 75', 81'	Report	Carmona (yellow card) 36'; Campagnolo (red card) 38'	Stadium: Stadio Artemio Franchi; Attendance: 28,931; Referee: Daniele Orsato

26 October 2008 8	Palermo	1–3	Fiorentina	Palermo
20:30 CET (UTC+01:00)	Simplício 50'; Bresciano (yellow card) 77'; Liverani (yellow card) 86'	Report	Gilardino 20'; Mutu 42', 62'; Montolivo (yellow card) 70'	Stadium: Stadio Renzo Barbera; Attendance: 21,679; Referee: Emidio Morganti

29 October 2008 9	Fiorentina	0–0	Internazionale	Florence
20:30 CET (UTC+01:00)	Krøldrup (yellow card) 53'	Report	Maicon (yellow card) 60'	Stadium: Stadio Artemio Franchi; Attendance: 36,358; Referee: Roberto Rosetti

2 November 2008 10	Siena	1–0	Fiorentina	Siena
13:00 CET (UTC+01:00)	Calaiò (yellow card) 43'; Kharja 76'	Report	Pazzini (yellow card) 90+1'	Stadium: Stadio Artemio Franchi – Montepaschi Arena; Attendance: 12,352; Referee: Stefano Farina

9 November 2008 11	Fiorentina	2–1	Atalanta	Florence
15:00 CET (UTC+01:00)	Melo 20'; Gilardino 23'; Comotto (yellow card) 76'	Report	Garics (yellow card) 11'; Guarente (yellow card) 35'; Bonaventura (yellow card) 62'; Floccari 76' (pen.)	Stadium: Stadio Artemio Franchi; Attendance: 27,884; Referee: Antonio Damato

16 November 2008 12	Cagliari	1–0	Fiorentina	Cagliari
15:00 CET (UTC+01:00)	Acquafresca 31' (pen.); Fini (yellow card) 37'; Matheu (yellow card) 46'	Report	Melo (yellow card) 13'; Gamberini (yellow card) 31'; Frey (yellow card) 72'; Zauri (yellow card) 73'; Gilardino (yellow card) 76'	Stadium: Stadio Sant'Elia; Attendance: 12,000; Referee: Gabriele Gava

22 November 2008 13	Fiorentina	4–2	Udinese	Florence
18:00 CET (UTC+01:00)	Dainelli (yellow card) 18'; Vargas (yellow card) 35'; Mutu 52' (pen.); Montolivo 63', 78'; Gilardino 79'; Comotto (red card) 82'	Report	Floro Flores 29'; Pepe (yellow card) 35'; Domizzi (yellow card) 51'; Di Natale 83' (pen.); D'Agostino (yellow card) 83'	Stadium: Stadio Artemio Franchi; Attendance: 28,981; Referee: Daniele Orsato

30 November 2008 14	Roma	1–0	Fiorentina	Rome
15:00 CET (UTC+01:00)	De Rossi (yellow card) 19'; Totti 59'; Taddei (yellow card) 77'	Report	Melo (yellow card) 57'; Mutu (yellow card) 63'	Stadium: Stadio Olimpico; Attendance: 37,565; Referee: Paolo Tagliavento

7 December 2008 15	Torino	1–4	Fiorentina	Turin
15:00 CET (UTC+01:00)	Zanetti (yellow card) 64'; Rosina 77' (pen.); Rubin (yellow card) 87'	Report	Mutu 3'; Krøldrup (yellow card) 31'; Gilardino 43', 84'; Kuzmanović 75'; Melo (yellow card) 77'	Stadium: Stadio Olimpico di Torino; Attendance: 15,627; Referee: Massimiliano Saccani

14 December 2008 16	Fiorentina	2–0	Catania	Florence
15:00 CET (UTC+01:00)	Mutu 56'; Jovetić (yellow card) 69'; Gilardino 79'; Almirón (yellow card) 88'	Report	Terlizzi (yellow card) 22'; Martínez (yellow card) 45+1'; Tedesco (yellow card) 73'	Stadium: Stadio Artemio Franchi; Attendance: 27,256; Referee: Andrea De Marco

21 December 2008 17	Sampdoria	0–1	Fiorentina	Genoa
15:00 CET (UTC+01:00)	Bottinelli (yellow card) 15'; Campagnaro (yellow card) 16'	Report	Melo (yellow card) 3'; Montolivo 19', (yellow card) 82'; Vargas (yellow card) 70'; Mutu (yellow card) 85'	Stadium: Stadio Luigi Ferraris; Attendance: 22,813; Referee: Daniele Orsato

11 January 2009 18	Fiorentina	1–2	Lecce	Florence
15:00 CET (UTC+01:00)	Melo 24', (yellow card) 42'; Osvaldo (yellow card) 90+4' (red card) 90+4'	Report	Giacomazzi 6', (yellow card) 53'; Castillo 28'; Giuliatto (yellow card) 43'	Stadium: Stadio Artemio Franchi; Attendance: 27,551; Referee: Paolo Mazzoleni

17 January 2009 19	Milan	1–0	Fiorentina	Milan
20:30 CET (UTC+01:00)	Pato 7'; Beckham (yellow card) 30'; Jankulovski (yellow card) 33' (yellow-red card) 90+1'	Report	Vargas (yellow card) 22'; Comotto (yellow card) 26'	Stadium: San Siro; Attendance: 65,692; Referee: Roberto Rosetti

24 January 2009 20	Juventus	1–0	Fiorentina	Turin
20:30 CET (UTC+01:00)	Marchisio 21'; Grygera (yellow card) 26'; Zanetti (yellow card) 66'; Giovinco (yellow card) 88'	Report	Montolivo (yellow card) 31'; Melo (yellow card) 66'	Stadium: Stadio Olimpico di Torino; Attendance: 22,560; Referee: Massimiliano Saccani

28 January 2009 21	Fiorentina	2–1	Napoli	Florence
20:30 CET (UTC+01:00)	Santana 47'; Zauri (yellow card) 52'; Comotto (yellow card) 71'; Montolivo 79'	Report	Vitale 49'; Montervino (yellow card) 85' (yellow-red card) 90+2'	Stadium: Stadio Artemio Franchi; Attendance: 28,863; Referee: Nicola Rizzoli

2 February 2009 22	Bologna	1–3	Fiorentina	Bologna
15:15 CET (UTC+01:00)	Mingazzini 52'; Osvaldo (yellow card) 72'	Report	Mutu 6', 16', (yellow card) 8'; Montolivo (yellow card) 20'; Comotto (yellow card) 80'; Gilardino 90+3'	Stadium: Stadio Renato Dall'Ara; Attendance: 10,261; Referee: Daniele Orsato

8 February 2009 23	Fiorentina	1–0	Lazio	Florence
15:00 CET (UTC+01:00)	Dainelli (yellow card) 28'; Montolivo (yellow card) 35'; Gilardino 89'; Melo (yellow card) 90+1'	Report	De Silvestri (yellow card) 11' (yellow-red card) 18'; Ledesma (yellow card) 35'; Zárate (yellow card) 59'; Muslera (yellow card) 62'	Stadium: Stadio Artemio Franchi; Attendance: 28,787; Referee: Andrea De Marco

15 February 2009 24	Genoa	3–3	Fiorentina	Genoa
15:00 CET (UTC+01:00)	Motta 11', (yellow card) 89'; Biava (yellow card) 13' (yellow-red card) 30'; Palladino 38'; Jurić (yellow card) 39'; Milito 56' (pen.)	Report	Jovetić (yellow card) 21'; Gamberini (yellow card) 56'; Mutu 60' (pen.), 80', 90+4'; Bonazzoli (yellow card) 83'; Donadel (yellow card) 90'	Stadium: Stadio Luigi Ferraris; Attendance: 27,253; Referee: Nicola Rizzoli

22 February 2009 25	Fiorentina	2–1	Chievo	Florence
15:00 CET (UTC+01:00)	Kuzmanović (yellow card) 25'; Gilardino 73', (yellow card) 90'; Mutu 90+4'	Report	Morero 13'; Mantovani (yellow card) 62'; Italiano (yellow card) 68' (yellow-red card) 82'; Sorrentino (yellow card) 72'; Colucci (yellow card) 76'	Stadium: Stadio Artemio Franchi; Attendance: 27,599; Referee: Christian Brighi

1 March 2009 26	Reggina	1–1	Fiorentina	Reggio Calabria
15:00 CET (UTC+01:00)	Sestu 20', (yellow card) 22'; Krajčík (yellow card) 59'; Cozza (yellow card) 74'; Lanzaro (yellow card) 87'	Report	Bonazzoli 22'; Vargas (yellow card) 25'; Melo (yellow card) 90+2'	Stadium: Stadio Oreste Granillo; Attendance: 9,600; Referee: Mauro Bergonzi

8 March 2009 27	Fiorentina	0–2	Palermo	Florence
15:00 CET (UTC+01:00)	Dainelli (yellow card) 42'	Report	Carrozzieri (yellow card) 24'; Guana (yellow card) 43'; Bovo (yellow card) 46'; Simplício 48'; Miccoli 56'	Stadium: Stadio Artemio Franchi; Attendance: 29,179; Referee: Andrea De Marco

15 March 2009 28	Internazionale	2–0	Fiorentina	Milan
20:30 CET (UTC+01:00)	Ibrahimović 11', 90+5'; Balotelli (yellow card) 33'; Samuel (yellow card) 42'; Muntari (yellow card) 51'; Santon (yellow card) 63'; Júlio César (yellow card) 71'	Report	Melo (yellow card) 49'	Stadium: San Siro; Attendance: 51,535; Referee: Daniele Orsato

22 March 2009 29	Fiorentina	1–0	Siena	Florence
15:00 CET (UTC+01:00)	Gamberini (yellow card) 29'; Comotto (yellow card) 32'; Melo (yellow card) 69'; Mutu 72'	Report	Brandão (yellow card) 49'; Del Grosso (yellow card) 69'	Stadium: Stadio Artemio Franchi; Attendance: 29,238; Referee: Luca Banti

5 April 2009 30	Atalanta	1–2	Fiorentina	Bergamo
13:00 CEST (UTC+02:00)	Parravicini (yellow card) 29'; Valdés (yellow card) 30'; Plasmati 50', (yellow card) 56'; Padoin (yellow card) 51'; Peluso (red card) 57'; Pellegrino (yellow card) 78'	Report	Almirón (yellow card) 2'; Jovetić 59' (pen.); Gilardino 90', (yellow card) 90'	Stadium: Stadio Atleti Azzurri d'Italia; Attendance: 12,083; Referee: Matteo Trefoloni

12 April 2009 31	Fiorentina	2–1	Cagliari	Florence
15:00 CEST (UTC+02:00)	Gilardino (yellow card) 51'; Pasqual 53'; Montolivo (yellow card) 83'; Vargas 85'	Report	Conti (yellow card) 39'; Agostini (yellow card) 54' (yellow-red card) 65'; Canini (yellow card) 55' (yellow-red card) 89'; Cossu (yellow card) 61'; López (yellow card) 74'; Ragatzu 87'	Stadium: Stadio Artemio Franchi; Attendance: 30,288; Referee: Antonio Damato

19 April 2009 32	Udinese	3–1	Fiorentina	Udine
15:00 CEST (UTC+02:00)	Asamoah 10'; D'Agostino 47' (pen.), 69'	Report	Gamberini (yellow card) 32'; Dainelli 67', (yellow card) 68'; Kuzmanović (yellow card) 89'	Stadium: Stadio Friuli; Attendance: 16,736; Referee: Mauro Bergonzi

25 April 2009 33	Fiorentina	4–1	Roma	Florence
20:30 CEST (UTC+02:00)	Vargas 6', (yellow card) 8'; Donadel (yellow card) 20'; Dainelli (yellow card) 45+2'; Gilardino 47', 67'; Semioli (yellow card) 59'; Gobbi 73'	Report	Cassetti (yellow card) 27'; Brighi (yellow card) 50'; Pizarro (yellow card) 55' (yellow-red card) 59'; Baptista 87'	Stadium: Stadio Artemio Franchi; Attendance: 35,683; Referee: Luca Banti

3 May 2009 34	Fiorentina	1–0	Torino	Florence
15:00 CEST (UTC+02:00)	Kuzmanović (yellow card) 53'; Vargas 57'	Report	Ogbonna (yellow card) 37'; Sereni (red card) 90+2'	Stadium: Stadio Artemio Franchi; Attendance: 31,218; Referee: Stefano Farina

10 May 2009 35	Catania	0–2	Fiorentina	Catania
15:00 CEST (UTC+02:00)	Carboni (yellow card) 14'; Silvestri (yellow card) 34'; Tedesco (yellow card) 58'	Report	Jovetić 11'; Montolivo (yellow card) 38'; Comotto (yellow card) 61'; Dainelli (yellow card) 67'; Zauri 90+2'	Stadium: Stadio Angelo Massimino; Attendance: 18,142; Referee: Nicola Rizzoli

17 May 2009 36	Fiorentina	1–0	Sampdoria	Florence
15:00 CEST (UTC+02:00)	Gilardino 21'	Report	Raggi (yellow card) 53'; Ferri (yellow card) 72'; Sammarco (yellow card) 86'	Stadium: Stadio Artemio Franchi; Attendance: 38,005; Referee: Andrea Gervasoni

24 May 2009 37	Lecce	1–1	Fiorentina	Lecce
15:00 CEST (UTC+02:00)	Zanchetta (yellow card) 31'; Tiribocchi 50'; Giuliatto (yellow card) 75'; Fabiano (yellow card) 76'	Report	Krøldrup (yellow card) 19'; Dainelli (yellow card) 61'; Melo (yellow card) 81' (red card) 88'; Jørgensen 89'	Stadium: Stadio Via del Mare; Attendance: 7,608; Referee: Gabriele Gava

31 May 2009 38	Fiorentina	0–2	Milan	Florence
15:00 CEST (UTC+02:00)		Report	Flamini (yellow card) 45+1'; Kaká 55'; Pato 76'	Stadium: Stadio Artemio Franchi; Attendance: 41,839; Referee: Nicola Rizzoli

=== Coppa Italia ===
17 December 2008 Round of 16	Fiorentina	0–1	Torino	Florence
20:30 CET (UTC+01:00)			Bianchi 19'	Stadium: Stadio Artemio Franchi; Referee: Antonio Damato

=== UEFA Champions League ===
==== Third qualifying round ====
12 August 2008 First leg	Fiorentina (Italy)	2–0	(Czech Republic) Slavia Prague	Florence, Italy
20:45 CEST (UTC+02:00)	Mutu 3'; Gilardino 57'	Report	Belaïd (yellow card) 62'	Stadium: Stadio Artemio Franchi; Attendance: 32,560; Referee: Howard Webb (England)

27 August 2008 Second leg	Slavia Prague (Czech Republic)	0–0 (0–2 agg.)	(Italy) Fiorentina	Prague, Czech Republic
20:45 CEST (UTC+02:00)		Report	Gobbi (yellow card) 74'	Stadium: Synot Tip Arena; Attendance: 14,943; Referee: Bertrand Layec (France)

==== Group stage ====
Pos	Team	Pld	W	D	L	GF	GA	GD	Pts	Qualification
1	(Germany) Bayern Munich	6	4	2	0	12	4	+8	14	Advance to knockout phase
2	(France) Lyon	6	3	2	1	14	10	+4	11	Advance to knockout phase
3	(Italy) Fiorentina	6	1	3	2	5	8	−3	6	Transfer to UEFA Cup
4	(Romania) Steaua București	6	0	1	5	3	12	−9	1	

Source: RSSSF

17 September 2008 1	Lyon (France)	2–2	(Italy) Fiorentina	Lyon, France
20:45 CEST (UTC+02:00)	Piquionne 73'; Benzema (yellow card) 74', (goal) 86'	Report	Gilardino 12', 42', (yellow card) 74'; Dainelli (yellow card) 62'; Melo (yellow card) 68'; Jørgensen (yellow card) 90+1'	Stadium: Stade de Gerland; Attendance: 43,000; Referee: Peter Fröjdfeldt (Sweden)

30 September 2008 2	Fiorentina (Italy)	0–0	(Romania) Steaua București	Florence, Italy
20:45 CEST (UTC+02:00)		Report	Marin (yellow card) 28'; Stancu (yellow card) 70'	Stadium: Stadio Artemio Franchi; Attendance: 25,383; Referee: Mike Riley (England)

21 October 2008 3	Bayern Munich (Germany)	3–0	(Italy) Fiorentina	Munich, Germany
20:45 CEST (UTC+02:00)	Klose 4'; Schweinsteiger 25'; Oddo (yellow card) 58'; Ribéry (yellow card) 82'; Zé Roberto 90'	Report	Kuzmanović (yellow card) 29'; Dainelli (yellow card) 64'; Gobbi (yellow card) 79'	Stadium: Allianz Arena; Attendance: 66,000; Referee: Olegário Benquerença (Portugal)

5 November 2008 4	Fiorentina (Italy)	1–1	(Germany) Bayern Munich	Florence, Italy
20:45 CET (UTC+01:00)	Mutu 11'; Montolivo (yellow card) 90+2'	Report	Borowski (yellow card) 45+1', (goal) 78'	Stadium: Stadio Artemio Franchi; Attendance: 37,034; Referee: Alberto Undiano Mallenco (Spain)

25 November 2008 5	Fiorentina (Italy)	1–2	(France) Lyon	Florence, Italy
20:45 CET (UTC+01:00)	Dainelli (yellow card) 45'; Gilardino 45'; Zauri (yellow card) 75'; Mutu (yellow card) 90+1'	Report	Makoun 15'; Benzema 27'; Juninho (yellow card) 56'; Cris (yellow card) 90+2'	Stadium: Stadio Artemio Franchi; Attendance: 23,736; Referee: Viktor Kassai (Hungary)

10 December 2008 6	Steaua București (Romania)	0–1	(Italy) Fiorentina	Bucharest, Romania
20:45 CET (UTC+01:00)	Nicoliță (yellow card) 1'; Moreno (yellow card) 20'; Semedo (yellow card) 21'; Golański (yellow card) 64' (yellow-red card) 72'; Lovin (yellow card) 71'; Rădoi (yellow card) 82'	Report	Zauri (yellow card) 15'; Gilardino (yellow card) 63', (goal) 66'	Stadium: Stadionul Steaua; Attendance: 14,862; Referee: Luis Medina Cantalejo (Spain)

=== UEFA Cup ===
==== Final phase ====
===== Round of 32 =====
19 February 2009 First leg	Fiorentina (Italy)	0–1	(Netherlands) Ajax	Florence, Italy
20:45 CET (UTC+01:00)	Gamberini (yellow card) 44'	Report	Suárez (yellow card) 44'; Schilder (yellow card) 45+1'; Bakircioglü 60'; Vermaelen (yellow card) 63'	Stadium: Stadio Artemio Franchi; Attendance: 19,018; Referee: César Muñiz Fernández (Spain)

26 February 2009 Second leg	Ajax (Netherlands)	1–1 (2–1 agg.)	(Italy) Fiorentina	Amsterdam, Netherlands
20:45 CET (UTC+01:00)	Enoh (yellow card) 15'; Lindgren (yellow card) 24'; Leonardo 88'	Report	Donadel (yellow card) 23'; Mutu (yellow card) 30'; Zauri (yellow card) 39'; Gilardino 61'	Stadium: Amsterdam Arena; Attendance: 42,779; Referee: Stefan Johannesson (Sweden)

== Statistics ==
=== Appearances and goals ===
No.	Pos	Nat	Player	Total		Serie A		UEFA Champions League		UEFA Cup		Coppa Italia	
No.	Pos	Nat	Player	Apps	Goals	Apps	Goals	Apps	Goals	Apps	Goals	Apps	Goals
1	GK	(France) FRA	Sébastien Frey	47	-36	37	-26	8	-8	2	-2	0	0
2	DF	(Denmark) DEN	Per Krøldrup	26	0	18+2	0	4	0	1	0	1	0
3	DF	(Italy) ITA	Dario Dainelli	29	1	20+1	1	7	0	1	0	0	0
4	DF	(Italy) ITA	Marco Donadel	33	0	19+10	0	2	0	1	0	1	0
5	DF	(Italy) ITA	Alessandro Gamberini	42	0	34	0	6	0	2	0	0	0
6	DF	(Peru) PER	Juan Manuel Vargas	34	3	24+3	3	7	0	0	0	0	0
7	MF	(Italy) ITA	Franco Semioli	23	0	13+8	0	0	0	2	0	0	0
8	FW	(Montenegro) MNE	Stevan Jovetić	35	2	19+10	2	3	0	2	0	1	0
10	FW	(Romania) ROU	Adrian Mutu	30	15	19	13	8	2	2	0	1	0
11	FW	(Italy) ITA	Alberto Gilardino	46	25	34+1	19	8	5	2	1	1	0
13	GK	(Italy) ITA	Marco Storari	2	-2	1	-1	0	0	0	0	1	-1
14	DF	(Italy) ITA	Luciano Zauri	29	1	13+5	1	8	0	2	0	1	0
17	FW	(Senegal) SEN	Papa Waigo	0	0	0	0	0	0	0	0	0	0
18	MF	(Italy) ITA	Riccardo Montolivo	42	4	32+2	4	6	0	2	0	0	0
19	MF	(Italy) ITA	Massimo Gobbi	22	1	6+11	1	4	0	1	0	0	0
20	MF	(Denmark) DEN	Martin Jørgensen	13	1	5+5	1	2	0	1	0	0	0
21	DF	(Italy) ITA	Gianluca Comotto	30	0	25+3	0	1	0	0	0	1	0
22	MF	(Serbia) SRB	Zdravko Kuzmanović	40	2	25+7	2	6	0	1	0	1	0
23	DF	(Italy) ITA	Manuel Pasqual	22	1	15+4	1	0	0	2	0	1	0
24	MF	(Argentina) ARG	Mario Santana	20	1	17+3	1	0	0	0	0	0	0
30	MF	(Argentina) ARG	Sergio Almirón	17	0	6+5	0	4	0	1	0	1	0
32	FW	(Italy) ITA	Emiliano Bonazzoli	12	1	1+11	1	0	0	0	0	0	0
44	DF	(Italy) ITA	Federico Masi	1	0	0	0	1	0	0	0	0	0
88	MF	(Brazil) BRA	Felipe Melo	40	2	29	2	8	0	2	0	1	0
Players sold or loaned out during the 2009 winter transfer window:
9	FW	(Italy) ITA	Dani Osvaldo	12	0	2+6	0	4	0	0	0	0	0
29	FW	(Italy) ITA	Giampaolo Pazzini	16	1	3+9	1	4	0	0	0	0	0
54	DF	(Portugal) POR	Manuel da Costa	2	0	1	0	0	0	0	0	1	0

=== Goalscorers ===
Rank	No.	Pos	Nat	Name	Serie A	Coppa Italia	UEFA CL	UEFA Cup	Total
Own goal					0	0	0	0	0
Totals					0	0	0	0	0

Last updated:

=== Clean sheets ===
Rank	No.	Pos	Nat	Name	Serie A	Coppa Italia	UEFA CL	UEFA Cup	Total
Totals					0	0	0	0	0

Last updated:

=== Disciplinary record ===
No.	Pos	Nat	Player	Serie A			Coppa Italia			UEFA CL			UEFA Cup			Total		
No.	Pos	Nat	Player	Yellow card	(yellow card) (yellow-red card)	Red card	Yellow card	(yellow card) (yellow-red card)	Red card	Yellow card	(yellow card) (yellow-red card)	Red card	Yellow card	(yellow card) (yellow-red card)	Red card	Yellow card	(yellow card) (yellow-red card)	Red card
Totals				0	0	0	0	0	0	0	0	0	0	0	0	0	0	0

Last updated:
