= 2007–08 ACF Fiorentina season =

Fiorentina
2007–08 season
- President: Andrea Della Valle
- Manager: Cesare Prandelli
- Stadium: Stadio Artemio Franchi
- Serie A: 4th
- Coppa Italia: Quarter-finals
- UEFA Cup: Semi-finals
- Top goalscorer: League: Adrian Mutu (17); All: Adrian Mutu (23)
- Highest home attendance: 42,449 vs Internazionale (2 December 2007, Serie A)
- Lowest home attendance: 3,733 vs Ascoli (11 December 2007, Coppa Italia)
- Average home league attendance: 31,387
Home colours	Away colours	Third colours

The 2007–08 season was ACF Fiorentina's 82nd season in Italian football in their existence and their 70th season in the first-tier of Italian football, Serie A. Having finished 6th the previous season with a tally of 58 points, La Viola earned qualification into the first round of the 2007–08 UEFA Cup.

The 2007–08 season was a very successful one for the Viola. They reached the semi-finals of the UEFA Cup where they were beaten on penalties by Rangers and finished fourth in Serie A ahead of Milan, thus qualifying for the 2008–09 UEFA Champions League.

== Players ==
=== Squad information ===
As of 19 March 2008

Note: Flags indicate national team as defined under FIFA eligibility rules; some limited exceptions apply. Players may hold more than one non-FIFA nationality.

No.	Pos.	Nation	Player
1	GK	FRA	Sébastien Frey
2	DF	DEN	Per Krøldrup
3	DF	ITA	Dario Dainelli (captain)
4	MF	ITA	Marco Donadel
5	DF	ITA	Alessandro Gamberini
6	DF	ITA	Alessandro Potenza
7	MF	ITA	Franco Semioli
9	FW	ITA	Dani Osvaldo
10	FW	ROU	Adrian Mutu
11	MF	ITA	Fabio Liverani
12	GK	ITA	Cristiano Lupatelli
15	DF	CZE	Ondřej Mazuch
16	MF	CZE	Jan Hable
17	FW	SEN	Papa Waigo
18	MF	ITA	Riccardo Montolivo
19	MF	ITA	Massimo Gobbi

No.	Pos.	Nation	Player
20	MF	DEN	Martin Jørgensen
21	DF	CZE	Tomáš Ujfaluši
22	MF	SRB	Zdravko Kuzmanović
23	DF	ITA	Manuel Pasqual
24	MF	ARG	Mario Santana
25	GK	SRB	Vlada Avramov
26	DF	BRA	Alex (from youth team)
27	FW	ITA	Samuel Di Carmine (from youth team)
29	FW	ITA	Giampaolo Pazzini
31	GK	ITA	Edoardo Pazzagli (from youth team)
32	FW	ITA	Christian Vieri
33	DF	ITA	Massimiliano Tagliani (from youth team)
34	FW	FRA	Matthias Lepiller (from youth team)
35	MF	SEN	Pape Diakhaté (from youth team)
54	DF	POR	Manuel da Costa
99	FW	ITA	Daniele Cacia

== Transfers ==
=== In ===
Summer transfer window

No.	Pos.	Player	From	Fee
14	FW	(Italy) Arturo Lupoli	Arsenal	free transfer
16	MF	(Czech Republic) Jan Hable	Hradec Králové	€0.8 million
15	DF	(Czech Republic) Ondřej Mazuch	Brno	€2.8 million
13	DF	(Belgium) Anthony Vanden Borre	Anderlecht	undisclosed
17	DF	(Italy) Federico Balzaretti	Juventus	€3.8 million
--	FW	(Italy) Leonardo Pettinari	Sangiovannese	Co-ownership Resolution, undisclosed
7	MF	(Italy) Franco Semioli	Chievo	€5.5 million
32	FW	(Italy) Christian Vieri	Atalanta	free transfer
99	FW	(Italy) Daniele Cacia	Piacenza	Undisclosed
9	FW	(Argentina) Pablo Daniel Osvaldo	Atalanta	€4.5 million
8	MF	(Italy) Michele Pazienza	Udinese	Undisclosed

Winter transfer window

No.	Pos.	Player	From	Fee
17	FW	(Senegal) Papa Waigo	Genoa	undisclosed
54	DF	(Portugal) Manuel da Costa	PSV	€4.5 million
--	MF	(Italy) Giacomo Zappacosta	Pescara	undisclosed

=== Out ===
Summer transfer window

No.	Pos.	Player	To	Fee
17	MF	(Italy) Manuele Blasi	Juventus	loan return
30	FW	(Italy) Luca Toni	Bayern Munich	€11 million
32	DF	(Italy) Davide Brivio	Atalanta	undisclosed
--	DF	(Italy) Christian Maggio	Sampdoria	undisclosed
83	FW	(Brazil) Reginaldo	Parma	€4.5 million
--	FW	(Italy) Leonardo Pettinari	Reggina	undisclosed
--	MF	(Italy) Alessandro Gherardi	Bellinzona	undisclosed
8	FW	(Bulgaria) Valeri Bojinov	Manchester City	€8 million

Winter transfer window

No.	Pos.	Player	From	Fee
13	DF	(Belgium) Anthony Vanden Borre	Genoa	undisclosed
17	DF	(Italy) Federico Balzaretti	Palermo	undisclosed
8	MF	(Italy) Michele Pazienza	Napoli	€3 million

=== On loan ===
No.	Pos.	Player	On loan to	Until
14	FW	(Italy) Arturo Lupoli	Treviso	June 2008
--	MF	(Brazil) Guilherme	Mantova	June 2008
--	MF	(Italy) Andrea Paolucci	Cesena	June 2008

== Competitions ==
=== Overall ===
Competition	Started round	Current position	Final position	First match	Last match
Serie A	Matchday 1	—	4th	26 August 2007	18 May 2008
Coppa Italia	Round of 16	—	Quarter-finals	11 December 2007	30 January 2008
UEFA Cup	First round	—	Semi-finals	20 September 2007	1 May 2008

Last updated: 18 May 2008

=== Serie A ===
==== League table ====
Pos	Team	Pld	W	D	L	GF	GA	GD	Pts	Qualification or relegation
2	Roma	38	24	10	4	72	37	+35	82	Qualification to Champions League group stage
3	Juventus	38	20	12	6	72	37	+35	72	Qualification to Champions League third qualifying round
4	Fiorentina	38	19	9	10	55	39	+16	66	Qualification to Champions League third qualifying round
5	Milan	38	18	10	10	66	38	+28	64	Qualification to UEFA Cup first round (Note: The 7th-placed team qualified for the UEFA Cup due to both of the Coppa Italia finalists, Roma and Internazionale, finishing 6th or higher.)
6	Sampdoria	38	17	9	12	56	46	+10	60	Qualification to UEFA Cup first round

Source: Serie A
Rules for classification: 1) points; 2) head-to-head points; 3) head-to-head goal difference; 4) head-to-head goals scored; 5) goal difference; 6) number of goals scored.

==== Results summary ====
Overall								Home						Away					
Pld	W	D	L	GF	GA	GD	Pts	W	D	L	GF	GA	GD	W	D	L	GF	GA	GD
38	19	9	10	55	39	+16	66	12	4	3	35	18	+17	7	5	7	20	21	−1

Last updated: 18 May 2008.
Source: Competitive matches

==== Results by round ====
Round	1	2	3	4	5	6	7	8	9	10	11	12	13	14	15	16	17	18	19	20	21	22	23	24	25	26	27	28	29	30	31	32	33	34	35	36	37	38
Ground	H	A	H	A	H	A	H	H	A	H	A	H	A	H	A	A	H	A	H	A	H	A	H	A	H	A	A	H	A	H	A	H	A	H	H	A	H	A
Result	W	D	D	W	D	W	D	W	D	W	W	L	D	L	L	D	W	W	W	W	L	D	W	L	W	W	L	W	L	W	L	W	L	W	D	L	W	W
Position	3	4	6	4	6	3	4	3	3	4	2	3	5	5	5	5	5	5	4	4	4	4	4	5	4	4	4	4	4	4	4	4	4	4	4	5	4	4

Updated to match(es) played on 18 May 2008. Source: Competitive matches
A = Away; H = Home; W = Win; D = Draw; L = Loss

==== Matches ====
26 August 2007 1	Fiorentina	3–1	Empoli	Florence
15:00 CEST (UTC+02:00)	Pazzini 56'; Mutu 65'; Montolivo 70'	Report	Giacomazzi (yellow card) 26'; Saudati 90+2'	Stadium: Stadio Artemio Franchi; Attendance: 31,280; Referee: Matteo Trefoloni

3 September 2007 2	Milan	1–1	Fiorentina	Milan
18:00 CEST (UTC+02:00)	Kaká 27' (pen.); Gattuso (yellow card) 83'	Report	Mutu 56'; Ujfaluši (yellow card) 79'; Liverani (yellow card) 83'; Semioli (yellow card) 90+3'	Stadium: San Siro; Attendance: 57,000; Referee: Stefano Farina

16 September 2007 3	Fiorentina	2–2	Atalanta	Florence
15:00 CEST (UTC+02:00)	Rivalta 26' (o.g.); Dainelli (yellow card) 46'; Pasqual (yellow card) 52'; Vieri 74', (yellow card) 75'; Donadel (yellow card) 90'	Report	Doni (yellow card) 34', (goal) 51'; Carrozzieri (yellow card) 45+4' (yellow-red card) 48'; Langella (yellow card) 54'; Talamonti (yellow card) 60'; Zampagna 86'	Stadium: Stadio Artemio Franchi; Attendance: 28,383; Referee: Domenico Celi

23 September 2007 4	Catania	0–1	Fiorentina	Catania
15:00 CEST (UTC+02:00)	Terlizzi (yellow card) 14'; Spinesi (yellow card) 34'; Martínez (yellow card) 43'; Tedesco (yellow card) 44'; Baiocco (red card) 79'	Report	Mutu 4'; Montolivo (yellow card) 27'; Santana (yellow card) 44'	Stadium: Stadio Angelo Massimino; Attendance: 18,000; Referee: Antonio Danilo Giannoccaro

26 September 2007 5	Fiorentina	2–2	Roma	Florence
20:30 CEST (UTC+02:00)	Gamberini 24'; Donadel (yellow card) 45' (yellow-red card) 85'; Mutu (yellow card) 76', (goal) 80' (pen.); Montolivo (yellow card) 90'	Report	Mexès (yellow card) 16'; Mancini 19'; Giuly 37'; Ferrari (yellow card) 79'	Stadium: Stadio Artemio Franchi; Attendance: 36,056; Referee: Mauro Bergonzi

29 September 2007 6	Livorno	0–3	Fiorentina	Livorno
20:30 CEST (UTC+02:00)	Giannichedda (yellow card) 23'; Filippini (yellow card) 36'; Galante (yellow card) 56'; Loviso (red card) 63'; Pasquale (yellow card) 82'	Report	Gamberini (yellow card) 6'; Liverani (yellow card) 24'; Gobbi (yellow card) 37'; Osvaldo 45', 66'; Santana 69'	Stadium: Stadio Armando Picchi; Attendance: 7,005; Referee: Roberto Rosetti

7 October 2007 7	Fiorentina	1–1	Juventus	Florence
15:00 CEST (UTC+02:00)	Kuzmanović (yellow card) 43'; Mutu 89' (pen.); Vieri (yellow card) 90+3'	Report	Nocerino (yellow card) 18'; Iaquinta 23'; Legrottaglie (yellow card) 83'; Chiellini (yellow card) 90+3'	Stadium: Stadio Artemio Franchi; Attendance: 40,087; Referee: Nicola Rizzoli

21 October 2007 8	Fiorentina	3–0	Siena	Florence
15:00 CEST (UTC+02:00)	Pazzini 15'; Mutu 31'; Vieri 71'	Report	Jarolím (yellow card) 33'; Loria (yellow card) 44'; Maccarone (yellow card) 88'	Stadium: Stadio Artemio Franchi; Attendance: 28,108; Referee: Antonio Damato

28 October 2007 9	Genoa	0–0	Fiorentina	Genoa
20:30 CET (UTC+01:00)	Jurić (yellow card) 40'; Sculli (yellow card) 42'; De León (yellow card) 45+3'	Report	Ujfaluši (yellow card) 48'; Montolivo (yellow card) 54'; Vieri (yellow card) 83'; Donadel (yellow card) 88'; Krøldrup (yellow card) 89'	Stadium: Stadio Luigi Ferraris; Attendance: 24,000; Referee: Emidio Morganti

31 October 2007 10	Fiorentina	1–0	Napoli	Florence
20:30 CET (UTC+01:00)	Vieri 61'; Dainelli (yellow card) 70'; Pasqual (yellow card) 83'	Report	Savini (yellow card) 51'; Domizzi (yellow card) 51'; Cannavaro (yellow card) 56'	Stadium: Stadio Artemio Franchi; Attendance: 32,568; Referee: Gabriele Gava

3 November 2007 11	Lazio	0–1	Fiorentina	Rome
18:00 CET (UTC+01:00)	Mutarelli (yellow card) 65' (yellow-red card) 90+4'; Mudingayi (yellow card) 90+3'	Report	Pazzini 19', (yellow card) 25'; Pasqual (yellow card) 34'; Mutu (yellow card) 69'	Stadium: Stadio Olimpico; Attendance: 12,000; Referee: Paolo Dondarini

11 November 2007 12	Fiorentina	1–2	Udinese	Florence
15:10 CET (UTC+01:00)	Pazzini 28'; Semioli (yellow card) 66'; Pasqual (red card) 83'	Report	Pepe (yellow card) 22'; Quagliarella 23'; Zapata (yellow card) 34'; Di Natale 62'; Handanović (yellow card) 68'; D'Agostino (yellow card) 90+3'	Stadium: Stadio Artemio Franchi; Attendance: 28,382; Referee: Domenico Celi

25 November 2007 13	Reggina	0–0	Fiorentina	Reggio Calabria
15:00 CET (UTC+01:00)	Cascione (yellow card) 53'; Barreto (yellow card) 90+4'	Report	Montolivo (yellow card) 41'; Balzaretti (yellow card) 45'	Stadium: Stadio Oreste Granillo; Attendance: 8,000; Referee: Nicola Ayroldi

2 December 2007 14	Fiorentina	0–2	Internazionale	Florence
15:00 CET (UTC+01:00)	Potenza (yellow card) 70'	Report	Jiménez 10'; Chivu (yellow card) 32'; Cruz 44'; Cambiasso (yellow card) 44'; Maicon (yellow card) 63'	Stadium: Stadio Artemio Franchi; Attendance: 42,442; Referee: Stefano Farina

8 December 2007 15	Palermo	2–0	Fiorentina	Palermo
20:30 CET (UTC+01:00)	Miccoli 17', (yellow card) 19'; Zaccardo (yellow card) 26'; Simplício (yellow card) 52', (goal) 80'; Bresciano (yellow card) 66'	Report	Gobbi (yellow card) 9'; Montolivo (yellow card) 13'; Donadel (yellow card) 37'	Stadium: Stadio Renzo Barbera; Attendance: 22,823; Referee: Emidio Morganti

16 December 2007 16	Sampdoria	2–2	Fiorentina	Genoa
15:00 CET (UTC+01:00)	Gastaldello 18'; Cassano (yellow card) 40', (goal) 70'	Report	Pazienza (yellow card) 30'; Mutu 39'; Donadel 58'; Liverani (yellow card) 70'; Santana (yellow card) 72'	Stadium: Stadio Luigi Ferraris; Attendance: 20,000; Referee: Gabriele Gava

23 December 2007 17	Fiorentina	5–1	Cagliari	Florence
15:00 CET (UTC+01:00)	Montolivo 3'; Mutu 41', 45+1' (pen.); Santana 48', 79'; Dainelli (yellow card) 76'	Report	Fini 6'; Ferri (yellow card) 38'	Stadium: Stadio Artemio Franchi; Attendance: 26,076; Referee: Carmine Russo

13 January 2008 18	Parma	1–2	Fiorentina	Parma
15:00 CET (UTC+01:00)	Coly 69'	Report	Mutu 44', 85' (pen.)	Stadium: Stadio Ennio Tardini; Attendance: 15,162; Referee: Christian Brighi

19 January 2008 19	Fiorentina	2–1	Torino	Florence
20:30 CET (UTC+01:00)	Vieri 45+1' (pen.); Montolivo (yellow card) 54'; Mutu 75' (pen.)	Report	Corini (yellow card) 36'; Grella 58'; Lanna (yellow card) 75'	Stadium: Stadio Artemio Franchi; Attendance: 27,995; Referee: Paolo Tagliavento

27 January 2008 20	Empoli	0–2	Fiorentina	Empoli
15:00 CET (UTC+01:00)	Pozzi (yellow card) 7'; Pratali (yellow card) 69'; Vanigli (yellow card) 90'	Report	Ujfaluši (yellow card) 21'; Donadel (yellow card) 39'; Mutu 86'; Pazzini 90+3', (yellow card) 90+4'	Stadium: Stadio Carlo Castellani; Attendance: 12,000; Referee: Stefano Farina

3 February 2008 21	Fiorentina	0–1	Milan	Florence
20:30 CET (UTC+01:00)		Report	Oddo (yellow card) 26'; Gilardino (yellow card) 42'; Nesta (yellow card) 49'; Pato 77'; Pirlo (yellow card) 86'	Stadium: Stadio Artemio Franchi; Attendance: 38,977; Referee: Massimiliano Saccani

9 February 2008 22	Atalanta	2–2	Fiorentina	Bergamo
18:00 CET (UTC+01:00)	Tissone (yellow card) 15'; Manfredini (yellow card) 25'; Muslimović 30', 90', (yellow card) 69'; Langella (yellow card) 52'; De Ascentis (yellow card) 74'	Report	Pazzini 29'; Ujfaluši (yellow card) 42'; Semioli 60'; Montolivo (yellow card) 90+3'	Stadium: Stadio Atleti Azzurri d'Italia; Attendance: 10,822; Referee: Andrea De Marco

17 February 2008 23	Fiorentina	2–1	Catania	Florence
15:00 CET (UTC+01:00)	Kuzmanović 40'; Mutu 70', (yellow card) 78'; Pazzini (yellow card) 79'; Donadel (yellow card) 83'	Report	Vargas 60'; Silvestri (yellow card) 90'; Baiocco (yellow card) 90+2'	Stadium: Stadio Artemio Franchi; Attendance: 26,648; Referee: Luca Banti

24 February 2008 24	Roma	1–0	Fiorentina	Rome
15:00 CET (UTC+01:00)	Cicinho 54', (yellow card) 85' (yellow-red card) 90+2'; De Rossi (yellow card) 66'; Perrotta (yellow card) 90'	Report	Vieri (yellow card) 45+1'	Stadium: Stadio Olimpico; Attendance: 34,254; Referee: Emidio Morganti

27 February 2008 25	Fiorentina	1–0	Livorno	Florence
20:30 CET (UTC+01:00)	Kuzmanović (yellow card) 11'; Donadel (yellow card) 31'; Papa Waigo (yellow card) 43', (goal) 57'	Report	Knežević (yellow card) 17'; Pasquale (yellow card) 33'	Stadium: Stadio Artemio Franchi; Attendance: 26,291; Referee: Gabriele Gava

2 March 2008 26	Juventus	2–3	Fiorentina	Turin
15:00 CET (UTC+01:00)	Sissoko 29'; Camoranesi (yellow card) 56', (goal) 57'	Report	Gobbi 19', (yellow card) 61'; Papa Waigo 75'; Osvaldo (yellow card) 85' (yellow-red card) 90+4', (goal) 90+3'	Stadium: Stadio Olimpico di Torino; Attendance: 20,993; Referee: Stefano Farina

9 March 2008 27	Siena	1–0	Fiorentina	Siena
15:00 CET (UTC+01:00)	Maccarone (yellow card) 52' (yellow-red card) 81', (goal) 80'; Galloppa (yellow card) 71'; Riganò (yellow card) 90+4'	Report	Donadel (yellow card) 60'	Stadium: Stadio Artemio Franchi – Montepaschi Arena; Attendance: 14,000; Referee: Andrea De Marco

16 March 2008 28	Fiorentina	3–1	Genoa	Florence
15:00 CET (UTC+01:00)	Santana 19'; Mutu 30'; Gobbi (yellow card) 40'; Papa Waigo (yellow card) 45+1'; Pazzini 57'	Report	Lucarelli (yellow card) 29'; Konko (yellow card) 67'; Masiero 83'; Borriello (yellow card) 85'; De León (yellow card) 86'	Stadium: Stadio Artemio Franchi; Attendance: 28,628; Referee: Nicola Ayroldi

19 March 2008 29	Napoli	2–0	Fiorentina	Naples
20:30 CET (UTC+01:00)	Blasi (yellow card) 16'; Lavezzi 23', 31'; Savini (yellow card) 33'; Mannini (yellow card) 71'; Domizzi (yellow card) 72'; Cannavaro (yellow card) 90+1'	Report	Osvaldo (yellow card) 22'; Krøldrup (yellow card) 37'; Ujfaluši (yellow card) 65'	Stadium: Stadio San Paolo; Attendance: 47,500; Referee: Roberto Rosetti

22 March 2008 30	Fiorentina	1–0	Lazio	Florence
15:00 CET (UTC+01:00)	Liverani (yellow card) 23'; Potenza (yellow card) 49'; Santana (yellow card) 64'; Pazzini 77'; Mutu (yellow card) 90'	Report	Mutarelli (yellow card) 35' (yellow-red card) 37'; Mudingayi (yellow card) 66'; Ledesma (yellow card) 90+1'; Meghni (yellow card) 90+3'	Stadium: Stadio Artemio Franchi; Attendance: 26,579; Referee: Daniele Orsato

30 March 2008 31	Udinese	3–1	Fiorentina	Udine
15:00 CEST (UTC+02:00)	Inler 12'; Ferronetti (yellow card) 28'; Di Natale 72'; Quagliarella 76'	Report	Vieri 63'; Osvaldo (yellow card) 76'	Stadium: Stadio Friuli; Attendance: 15,000; Referee: Emidio Morganti

6 April 2008 32	Fiorentina	2–0	Reggina	Florence
15:00 CEST (UTC+02:00)	Pazzini 23'; Donadel (yellow card) 45+1'; Mutu 90+2'	Report	Valdez (yellow card) 59'	Stadium: Stadio Artemio Franchi; Attendance: 27,321; Referee: Domenico Celi

13 April 2008 33	Internazionale	2–0	Fiorentina	Milan
20:30 CEST (UTC+02:00)	Vieira (yellow card) 51'; Cambiasso 55'; Balotelli 62', (yellow card) 66'	Report	Gamberini (yellow card) 45'	Stadium: San Siro; Attendance: 53,483; Referee: Massimiliano Saccani

19 April 2008 34	Fiorentina	1–0	Palermo	Florence
20:30 CEST (UTC+02:00)	Donadel (yellow card) 19', (goal) 29'; Pazzini (yellow card) 70'; Kuzmanović (yellow card) 74'	Report	Zaccardo (yellow card) 12'; Amauri (yellow card) 25'; Biava (yellow card) 32'; Rinaudo (yellow card) 50' (yellow-red card) 73'; Cassani (yellow card) 70'; Bresciano (yellow card) 90'	Stadium: Stadio Artemio Franchi; Attendance: 27,321; Referee: Antonio Damato

27 April 2008 35	Fiorentina	2–2	Sampdoria	Florence
15:00 CEST (UTC+02:00)	Donadel (yellow card) 67'; Vieri 78'; Mutu 84' (pen.); Montolivo (yellow card) 90+3'	Report	Pieri (yellow card) 7'; Accardi (yellow card) 59'; Maggio 63', (yellow card) 86'; Gastaldello 90+4'	Stadium: Stadio Artemio Franchi; Attendance: 36,627; Referee: Roberto Rosetti

4 May 2008 36	Cagliari	2–1	Fiorentina	Cagliari
15:00 CEST (UTC+02:00)	Jeda 21'; Conti (yellow card) 44', (goal) 51'	Report	Pasqual (yellow card) 16'; Santana 53'; Gamberini (yellow card) 90'; Mutu (yellow card) 90' (red card) 90+1'	Stadium: Stadio Sant'Elia; Attendance: 18,000; Referee: Stefano Farina

11 May 2008 37	Fiorentina	3–1	Parma	Florence
15:00 CEST (UTC+02:00)	Santana 39'; Semioli (yellow card) 69', (goal) 77'; Ujfaluši (yellow card) 70'; Osvaldo 86'; Donadel (yellow card) 89'	Report	Budan 11'; Mariga (yellow card) 36'; Morrone (yellow card) 58'; Rossi (red card) 80'; Paci (yellow card) 85'; Dessena (yellow card) 89'	Stadium: Stadio Artemio Franchi; Attendance: 36,289; Referee: Emidio Morganti

18 May 2008 38	Torino	0–1	Fiorentina	Turin
15:00 CEST (UTC+02:00)		Report	Semioli (yellow card) 74'; Osvaldo 77'	Stadium: Stadio Olimpico di Torino; Attendance: 23,000; Referee: Stefano Farina

=== Coppa Italia ===
==== Round of 16 ====
11 December 2007 First leg	Ascoli	1–1	Fiorentina	Ascoli Piceno
20:30 CET (UTC+01:00)	Guberti 79'		Krøldrup 30'	Stadium: Stadio Cino e Lillo Del Duca; Attendance: 3,880; Referee: Paolo Valeri

16 January 2008 Second leg	Fiorentina	2–0 (3–1 agg.)	Ascoli	Florence
18:00 CET (UTC+01:00)	Pazzini 60', 70'			Stadium: Stadio Artemio Franchi; Attendance: 3,733; Referee: Georgio Lops

==== Quarter-finals ====
24 January 2008 First leg	Lazio	2–1	Fiorentina	Rome
20:00 CET (UTC+01:00)	Kolarov 19'; Behrami 20'		Pazzini 40'	Stadium: Stadio Olimpico; Attendance: 9,800; Referee: Massimiliano Saccani

30 January 2008 Second leg	Fiorentina	1–2 (2–4 agg.)	Lazio	Florence
16:45 CET (UTC+01:00)	Semioli 17'		Kolarov 34'; Rocchi 62'	Stadium: Stadio Artemio Franchi; Attendance: 10,457; Referee: Christian Brighi

=== UEFA Cup ===
==== First round ====
20 September 2007 First leg	Groningen (Netherlands)	1–1	(Italy) Fiorentina	Groningen, Netherlands
20:30 CEST (UTC+02:00)	Lovre 25'; Lindgren (yellow card) 60'	Report	Semioli 65'; Mutu (yellow card) 78'; Frey (yellow card) 86'	Stadium: Euroborg; Referee: Lucílio Batista (Portugal)

4 October 2007 Second leg	Fiorentina (Italy)	1–1 (a.e.t.) (2–2 agg.) (4–3 p)	(Netherlands) Groningen	Florence, Italy
21:00 CEST (UTC+02:00)	Mutu 59'; Donadel (yellow card) 64'	Report	Nevland 55'; Meerdink (yellow card) 73'; Silva (yellow card) 115'	Stadium: Stadio Artemio Franchi; Referee: Florian Meyer (Germany)
	Penalties
	Pazzini (penalty scored); Montolivo (penalty scored); Kuzmanović (penalty scored); Santana (penalty missed); Mutu (penalty scored)		(penalty missed) Levchenko; (penalty scored) Van de Laak; (penalty missed) Lindgren; (penalty scored) Silva; (penalty scored) Lovre

==== Group stage ====
Pos	Team	Pld	W	D	L	GF	GA	GD	Pts	Qualification	VIL	FIO	AEK	MLA	ELF
1	(Spain) Villarreal	4	3	1	0	7	3	+4	10	Advance to knockout stage	—	1–1	—	—	2–0
2	(Italy) Fiorentina	4	2	2	0	10	4	+6	8	Advance to knockout stage	—	—	—	2–1	6–1
3	(Greece) AEK Athens	4	1	2	1	4	4	0	5	Advance to knockout stage	1–2	1–1	—	—	—
4	(Czech Republic) Mladá Boleslav	4	1	0	3	5	6	−1	3		1–2	—	0–1	—	—
5	(Sweden) IF Elfsborg	4	0	1	3	3	12	−9	1		—	—	1–1	1–3	—

25 October 2007 1	Villarreal (Spain)	1–1	(Italy) Fiorentina	Villarreal, Spain
20:45 CEST (UTC+02:00)	Capdevila (yellow card) 21', (goal) 88'	Report	Pazienza (yellow card) 19'; Vieri 48'; Vanden Borre (yellow card) 85'; Ujfaluši (yellow card) 89'	Stadium: El Madrigal; Attendance: 15,000; Referee: Stéphane Lannoy (France)

8 November 2007 2	Fiorentina (Italy)	6–1	(Sweden) Elfsborg	Florence, Italy
20:45 CET (UTC+01:00)	Jørgensen 4', 78'; Vieri 5'; Donadel (yellow card) 55', (goal) 62'; Krøldrup 65'; Di Carmine 87'	Report	Ishizaki (yellow card) 36', (goal) 41'	Stadium: Stadio Artemio Franchi; Attendance: 18,732; Referee: Selçuk Dereli (Turkey)

29 November 2007 3	AEK Athens (Greece)	1–1	(Italy) Fiorentina	Athens, Greece
20:00 CET (UTC+01:00)	Ratinho (yellow card) 12'; Balzaretti 33' (o.g.)	Report	Osvaldo 29'; Krøldrup (yellow card) 66'; Liverani (yellow card) 71'	Stadium: Olympic Stadium; Attendance: 26,386; Referee: Craig Thomson (Scotland)

20 December 2007 4	Fiorentina (Italy)	2–1	(Czech Republic) Mladá Boleslav	Florence, Italy
20:45 CET (UTC+01:00)	Donadel (yellow card) 40'; Mutu 44' (pen.); Vieri 67'	Report	Kopic (yellow card) 45+1'; Rajnoch (yellow card) 56', (goal) 60'; Procházka (yellow card) 85'	Stadium: Stadio Artemio Franchi; Attendance: 11,140; Referee: João Ferreira (Portugal)

==== Final phase ====
===== Round of 32 =====
14 February 2008 First leg	Rosenborg (Norway)	0–1	(Italy) Fiorentina	Trondheim, Norway
20:45 CET (UTC+01:00)		Report	Mutu 16'; Montolivo (yellow card) 45'	Stadium: Lerkendal Stadion; Attendance: 16,000; Referee: Mark Clattenburg (England)

21 February 2008 Second leg	Fiorentina (Italy)	2–1 (3–1 agg.)	(Norway) Rosenborg	Florence, Italy
20:45 CET (UTC+01:00)	Liverani 38'; Cacia 81'	Report	Kvarme (yellow card) 53'; Storflor (yellow card) 84'; Y. Koné 88'	Stadium: Stadio Artemio Franchi; Attendance: 23,139; Referee: Darko Ceferin (Slovenia)

===== Round of 16 =====
6 March 2008 First leg	Fiorentina (Italy)	2–0	(England) Everton	Florence, Italy
20:45 CET (UTC+01:00)	Ujfaluši (yellow card) 40'; Kuzmanović 70'; Montolivo 81'; Gobbi (yellow card) 90+3'	Report	Yakubu (yellow card) 36'; Pienaar (yellow card) 40'; Howard (yellow card) 60'	Stadium: Stadio Artemio Franchi; Attendance: 32,934; Referee: Paul Allaerts (Belgium)

12 March 2008 Second leg	Everton (England)	2–0 (a.e.t.) (2–2 agg.) (2–4 p)	(Italy) Fiorentina	Liverpool, England
20:45 CET (UTC+01:00)	Johnson 16'; Arteta 67'; Yobo (yellow card) 74'; Yakubu (yellow card) 80'	Report	Dainelli (yellow card) 29'; Montolivo (yellow card) 32'; Pazzini (yellow card) 62'; Gamberini (yellow card) 90'; Jørgensen (yellow card) 100'	Stadium: Goodison Park; Attendance: 38,026; Referee: Eric Braamhaar (Netherlands)
	Penalties
	Gravesen (penalty scored); Yakubu (penalty missed); Arteta (penalty scored); Jagielka (penalty missed)		(penalty scored) Pazzini; (penalty scored) Montolivo; (penalty scored) Osvaldo; (penalty scored) Santana

===== Quarter-finals =====
3 April 2008 First leg	Fiorentina (Italy)	1–1	(Netherlands) PSV Eindhoven	Florence, Italy
20:45 CEST (UTC+02:00)	Mutu 56'; Donadel (yellow card) 90'	Report	Koevermans 63'; Farfán (yellow card) 90+3'	Stadium: Stadio Artemio Franchi; Attendance: 34,317; Referee: Laurent Duhamel (France)

10 April 2008 Second leg	PSV Eindhoven (Netherlands)	0–2 (1–3 agg.)	(Italy) Fiorentina	Eindhoven, Netherlands
20:45 CEST (UTC+02:00)	Marcellis (yellow card) 69'	Report	Mutu (yellow card) 19', (goal) 38', 53'; Donadel (yellow card) 25'	Stadium: Philips Stadion; Attendance: 35,000; Referee: Luis Medina Cantalejo (Spain)

===== Semi-finals =====
24 April 2008 First leg	Rangers (Scotland)	0–0	(Italy) Fiorentina	Glasgow, Scotland
20:45 CEST (UTC+02:00)		Report	Santana (yellow card) 22'; Gamberini (yellow card) 78'; Gobbi (yellow card) 83'	Stadium: Ibrox Stadium; Attendance: 49,199; Referee: Kyros Vassaras (Greece)

1 May 2008 Second leg	Fiorentina (Italy)	0–0 (a.e.t.) (0–0 agg.) (2–4 p)	(Scotland) Rangers	Florence, Italy
20:45 CEST (UTC+02:00)		Report	Thomson (yellow card) 28'; Weir (yellow card) 70'; Cousin (yellow card) 73' (yellow-red card) 109'	Stadium: Stadio Artemio Franchi; Attendance: 39,130; Referee: Frank De Bleeckere (Belgium)
	Penalties
	Kuzmanović (penalty scored); Montolivo (penalty scored); Liverani (penalty missed); Vieri (penalty missed)		(penalty missed) Ferguson; (penalty scored) Whittaker; (penalty scored) Papac; (penalty scored) Hemdani; (penalty scored) Novo

== Statistics ==
=== Appearances and goals ===
No.	Pos	Nat	Player	Total		Serie A		UEFA Cup		Coppa Italia	
No.	Pos	Nat	Player	Apps	Goals	Apps	Goals	Apps	Goals	Apps	Goals
1	GK	(France) FRA	Sébastien Frey	49	-11	35	0	13	-9	1	-2
2	DF	(Denmark) DEN	Per Krøldrup	29	2	18	0	8	1	3	1
3	DF	(Italy) ITA	Dario Dainelli	29	0	18+3	0	6	0	2	0
4	DF	(Italy) ITA	Marco Donadel	44	2	27+4	2	10	0	3	0
5	DF	(Italy) ITA	Alessandro Gamberini	41	1	31	1	9	0	1	0
6	DF	(Italy) ITA	Alessandro Potenza	17	0	11+4	0	0	0	2	0
7	MF	(Italy) ITA	Franco Semioli	32	2	12+9	2	7	0	4	0
9	FW	(Italy) ITA	Dani Osvaldo	25	6	7+6	5	8	1	4	0
10	FW	(Romania) ROU	Adrian Mutu	40	23	28+1	17	10	6	1	0
11	MF	(Italy) ITA	Fabio Liverani	39	1	23+5	0	10	1	1	0
12	GK	(Italy) ITA	Cristiano Lupatelli	6	-4	2	0	1	-1	3	-3
15	DF	(Czech Republic) CZE	Ondřej Mazuch	2	0	0	0	0	0	2	0
17	FW	(Senegal) SEN	Papa Waigo	7	2	2+5	2	0	0	0	0
18	MF	(Italy) ITA	Riccardo Montolivo	46	3	31+3	2	10	1	2	0
19	MF	(Italy) ITA	Massimo Gobbi	36	1	15+8	1	9	0	4	0
20	MF	(Denmark) DEN	Martin Jørgensen	39	2	14+12	0	10	2	3	0
21	DF	(Czech Republic) CZE	Tomáš Ujfaluši	43	0	28	0	13	0	2	0
22	MF	(Serbia) SRB	Zdravko Kuzmanović	48	3	25+9	1	12	2	2	0
23	DF	(Italy) ITA	Manuel Pasqual	40	0	25+4	0	9	0	2	0
24	MF	(Argentina) ARG	Mario Santana	34	6	22+4	6	8	0	0	0
25	GK	(Serbia) SRB	Vlada Avramov	2	0	1+1	0	0	0	0	0
27	FW	(Italy) ITA	Samuel Di Carmine	1	1	0	0	1	1	0	0
29	FW	(Italy) ITA	Giampaolo Pazzini	47	12	29+2	9	12	0	4	3
32	FW	(Italy) ITA	Christian Vieri	39	9	7+19	6	12	3	1	0
99	FW	(Italy) ITA	Daniele Cacia	5	1	0+3	0	1	1	1	0
Players sold or loaned out during the 2008 winter transfer window:
7	DF	(Italy) ITA	Federico Balzaretti	11	0	4+2	0	3	0	2	0
8	MF	(Italy) ITA	Michele Pazienza	16	0	3+5	0	4	0	4	0
13	DF	(Belgium) BEL	Anthony Vanden Borre	5	0	0+2	0	2	0	1	0
14	FW	(Italy) ITA	Arturo Lupoli	1	0	0	0	0	0	1	0

=== Goalscorers ===
Rank	No.	Pos	Nat	Name	Serie A	Coppa Italia	UEFA Cup	Total
Own goal					0	0	0	0
Totals					0	0	0	0

Last updated:

=== Clean sheets ===
Rank	No.	Pos	Nat	Name	Serie A	Coppa Italia	UEFA Cup	Total
Totals					0	0	0	0

Last updated:

=== Disciplinary record ===
No.	Pos	Nat	Player	Serie A			Coppa Italia			UEFA Cup			Total		
No.	Pos	Nat	Player	Yellow card	(yellow card) (yellow-red card)	Red card	Yellow card	(yellow card) (yellow-red card)	Red card	Yellow card	(yellow card) (yellow-red card)	Red card	Yellow card	(yellow card) (yellow-red card)	Red card
Totals				0	0	0	0	0	0	0	0	0	0	0	0

Last updated:
