= Pape Moussa Diakhatè =

Senegalese footballer (born 1989)

Personal information
- Date of birth: 22 April 1989 (age 37)
- Place of birth: Pikine, Senegal
- Height: 1.86 m (6 ft 1 in)
- Position: Midfielder

Team information
- Current team: Dinamo București

Youth career
- A.S. de Cambérène
- 2007–2009: Fiorentina

Senior career*
| Years | Team | Apps | (Gls) |
| 2009–2011 | Fiorentina | 0 | (0) |
| 2009–2011 | → Eupen (loan) | 6 | (1) |
| 2011–2013 | Eupen | 20 | (0) |
| 2013–2014 | Dinamo II București | ? | (?) |
| 2016-2017 | AC Virtus Bolzano | ? | (?) |
| 2017- | Thonon Évian Grand Genève | 2 | (0 fc leman presqu'ils 2020) |
- * Club domestic league appearances and goals as of 1 July 2020

Pape Moussa Diakhaté (born 22 April 1989) is a Senegalese footballer who currently plays for Thonon Évian.

== Biography ==
At age 18, he signed a 5-year contract with Italian Serie A club Fiorentina. In August 2009, he was loaned to Belgian Second Division for Eupen, made la Viola had a quota to register a new non-EU signing from abroad. Fiorentina later obtained 2 quotas and registered Keirrison and Adem Ljajić in January 2010.

He won promotion to Belgian First Division in June 2010. The club later kept Diakhatè in Eupen for another season, and his viola team-mate Matthias Lepiller and Jefferson also joined him on loan.
