= Manuel Pasqual =

Italian footballer

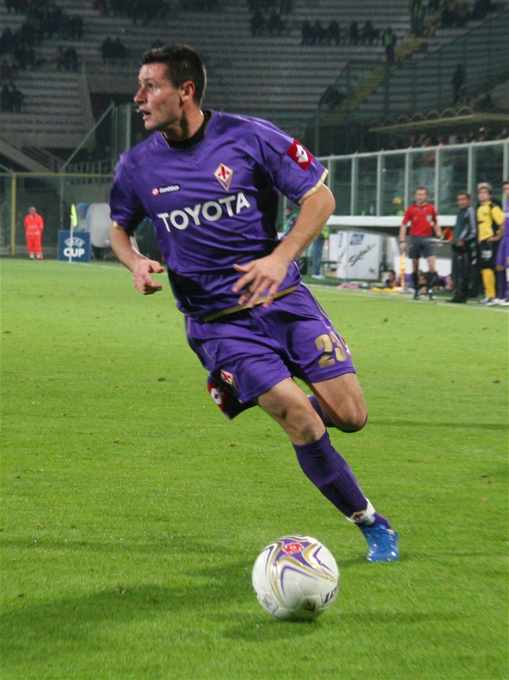
- Pasqual playing for Fiorentina in 2007

Personal information
- Full name: Manuel Pasqual
- Date of birth: 13 March 1982 (age 44)
- Place of birth: San Donà di Piave, Italy
- Height: 1.78 m (5 ft 10 in)
- Position: Left back

Senior career*
Years	Team	Apps	(Gls)
1999–2000	Derthona	15	(0)
2000–2001	Pordenone	30	(1)
2001–2002	Treviso	2	(0)
2002–2005	Arezzo	108	(3)
2005–2016	Fiorentina	302	(7)
2016–2019	Empoli	92	(7)

International career^{‡}
2006–2015	Italy	11	(0)
- * Club domestic league appearances and goals as of 09:30, 3 June 2019 (UTC) ‡ National team caps and goals as of 10 May 2017

Manuel Pasqual (Italian pronunciation: [ˈmaːnwel paˈskwal]; born 13 March 1982) is a retired Italian professional footballer who played for the Italy national team. He is an offensive left-back who is well known for his crossing ability. He is also capable of playing as a wide midfielder or as wing-back on the left in a 3–5–2 formation. Pasqual is a dead-ball specialist and often took free-kicks and corners for Fiorentina, providing several assists from his curling indirect set pieces and crosses.

== Club career ==
=== Early career ===
After a couple of seasons playing for lowly-placed Serie D teams such as Derthona and Pordenone, Pasqual joined Serie C1's Arezzo in January 2002, having previously played for Treviso, at that point also a team in Serie C1. Pasqual became a key player at Arezzo, and one of the main catalysts for promotion into Serie B. Pasqual played one more remarkable season for Arezzo.

=== Fiorentina ===
On 4 July 2005, Pasqual joined Fiorentina in a joint-ownership deal. He made his Serie A debut on 18 September against Udinese, a match which finished 4–2. His good form in his first Serie A season earned him a call-up to the Italy national team from its head coach, Marcello Lippi. Fiorentina made a full bid for his services in June 2006.

At Fiorentina, Pasqual became known for his powerful left foot and foraging runs. After a disappointing dip in form during the 2007–08 season, Pasqual was highly linked with the likes of Juventus and Napli, and was almost certain to leave with the arrival of winger Juan Manuel Vargas. However, Vargas' disappointing form in defence allowed him to move forward, and Pasqual made a grand return in the 2008–09 season, silencing many of his critics with his performances and even scoring his first goal in over two years.

In July 2009, Pasqual signed a new, three-year contract with Fiorentina. He extended his contract again in November 2011.

Since the 2012–13 season, Pasqual has been Fiorentina's team captain.

=== Empoli ===
On 31 May 2016, Pasqual signed with Empoli on a two-year contract.

== International career ==
Pasqual's performances earned him a national team call up by then-Italy coach Marcello Lippi, who capped him for a friendly match against Germany, played at his club's home stadium in Florence, the Stadio Artemio Franchi, on 1 March 2006. Italy sensationally won the match by 4–1, with Pasqual coming on in the last minute as a substitute for Mauro Camoranesi. Pasqual also attracted the attention of Roberto Donadoni, who succeeded Lippi. Donadoni called-up Pasqual for Italy's UEFA Euro 2008 qualification matches against Lithuania and France in September, and matches against Ukraine and Georgia in October. On 10 September 2013, he was capped by Italy coach Cesare Prandelli in a 2014 FIFA World Cup qualifier against the Czech Republic. He was named in Prandelli's 30-man provisional squad for the final tournament on 13 May 2014, but was cut from the final 23-man squad named on 1 June.

== Career statistics ==
=== Club ===
As of match played 26 May 2019

Appearances and goals by club, season and competition
Club	Season	League		Coppa Italia		Europe		Other		Total	
Club	Season	Apps	Goals	Apps	Goals	Apps	Goals	Apps	Goals	Apps	Goals
Derthona	1999–2000	15	0	0	0	—		—		15	0
Pordenone	2000–01	30	1	0	0	—		—		30	1
Treviso	2001–02	2	0	2	0	—		—		4	0
Arezzo	2001–02	10	0	0	0	—		—		10	0
Arezzo	2002–03	31	1	1	0	—		—		32	1
Arezzo	2003–04	28	2	1	0	—		2	1	31	3
Arezzo	2004–05	39	0	3	0	—		—		42	0
Arezzo	Total	108	3	5	0	—		—		115	4
Fiorentina	2005–06	35	1	4	0	—		—		39	1
Fiorentina	2006–07	34	0	2	0	—		—		36	0
Fiorentina	2007–08	29	0	2	0	9 (Note: All appearances in UEFA Cup)	0	—		40	0
Fiorentina	2008–09	19	1	1	0	2 (Note: All appearances in UEFA Europa League)	0	—		22	1
Fiorentina	2009–10	21	0	3	0	5 (Note: All appearances in UEFA Champions League)	0	—		29	0
Fiorentina	2010–11	34	1	0	0	—		—		34	1
Fiorentina	2011–12	32	0	2	0	—		—		34	0
Fiorentina	2012–13	35	2	3	1	—		—		38	3
Fiorentina	2013–14	26	0	4	1	5	0	—		35	1
Fiorentina	2014–15	20	2	1	0	7	1	—		28	3
Fiorentina	2015–16	17	0	1	0	3	0	—		21	0
Fiorentina	Total	302	7	23	2	31	1	—		356	10
Empoli	2016–17	32	2	1	0	—		—		33	2
Empoli	2017–18	38	4	1	0	—		—		39	4
Empoli	2018–19	22	1	1	0	—		—		23	1
Empoli	Total	92	7	3	0	0	0	0	0	95	7
Career total		549	18	33	2	31	1	—		615	22

=== International ===
As of match played 3 September 2015

Italy
Year	Apps	Goals
2006	2	0
2013	3	0
2014	4	0
2015	2	0
Total	11	0
