= Zdravko Kuzmanović =

Serbian footballer (born 1987)

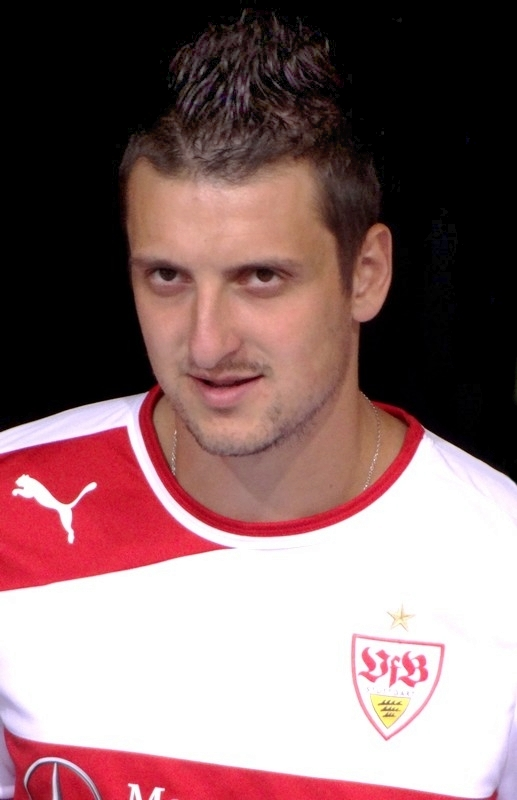
- Kuzmanović with VfB Stuttgart in 2011

Personal information
- Full name: Zdravko Kuzmanović
- Date of birth: 22 September 1987 (age 39)
- Place of birth: Thun, Switzerland
- Height: 1.86 m (6 ft 1 in)
- Position: Midfielder

Youth career
- 1994–2001: Dürrenast
- 2001–2003: Young Boys
- 2003–2005: FC Basel

Senior career*
Years	Team	Apps	(Gls)
2005–2007	FC Basel	34	(4)
2005	→ FC Basel II (loan)	12	(2)
2007–2009	Fiorentina	70	(3)
2009–2013	VfB Stuttgart	96	(17)
2013–2015	Inter Milan	42	(1)
2015–2020	FC Basel	28	(1)
2016	→ Udinese (loan)	16	(0)
2016–2018	→ Málaga (loan)	12	(0)
Total		310	(28)

International career
2006–2007	Switzerland U21	4	(0)
2007–2014	Serbia	50	(6)
- * Club domestic league appearances and goals as of 9 September 2020

Zdravko Kuzmanović (Serbian Cyrillic: Здравко Кузмановић, pronounced [zdrǎːʋko kuzmǎːnoʋitɕ]; born 22 September 1987) is a Serbian former footballer who played as a defensive or central midfielder. He last played for FC Basel. He represented Serbia in the 2010 FIFA World Cup.

== Early life ==
Born in Thun, Switzerland to a Bosnian Serb expat father Ljubo who had played football professionally and homemaker mother Petra, Zdravko grew up with a younger sister Nakica.

During early adolescence, Kuzmanović followed in his father's footsteps by pursuing organized football. He first joined the Dürrenast and Young Boys academies before moving to Basel.

== Club career ==
=== FC Basel ===
Kuzmanović started his professional career at Basel.

He was promoted to first team in 2005–06 season and also played for Basel II at 1. Liga that season. Kuzmanović scored his first goals for Basel in the second round of the Swiss Cup, in a 6–1 win over BSC Old Boys. Kuzmanović scored two more goals later in the season. Following his good performance, he was reported by UEFA as one of the most interesting young players in Europe and was awarded with the Swiss Golden Player Award for season 2006.

The 2006–07 season started well for Kuzmanović. He established himself in the first team and scored his first league goal of the season on 13 August 2006, in a 4–1 win over Thun. By the first half of the 2006–07 season, Kuzmanović had made twenty–eight appearances and scored five times in all competitions.

=== ACF Fiorentina ===
In early 2007, Kuzmanović was approached by Palermo, but the negotiations with the Rosaneri stopped abruptly. On 30 January 2007, at the age of 19, he signed a four-and-a-half-year contract with ACF Fiorentina after learning its midfielder Marco Donadel would be away for about two months because of a calf injury. The move was controversial when Palermo president Maurizio Zamparini and sporting director Rino Foschi accused Fiorentina of 'misconduct' by describing their director of football Pantaleo Corvino as a 'jackal'. In response, Corvino said "better jackal than chicken" before reaffirming the correctness of his actions. In an interview for the club's official website years later, Kuzmanović explained how his move to Palermo fell through.

I did not like Zamparini. It was him and the tall bald guy [Foschi, ed] [...] plus a girl for the translation. They gave me only five minutes, said they had to return to Italy. The contract was not good but how could I decide quickly? I said am I important or not? If I am you can not do it all in five minutes. They did not answer, I closed it there: Take the plane, I'm going home. Then one day my agent called and said Fiorentina want you, they are a great club and are serious about you. I said yes immediately.

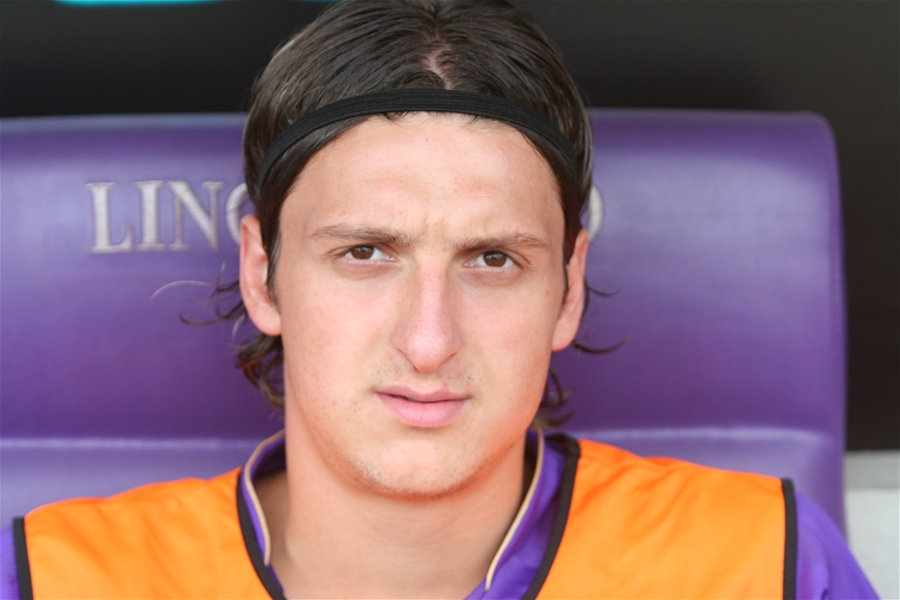
Kuzmanović at Fiorentina

After being on the substitute bench for most of the matches, he played his first Serie A match for Fiorentina in a 5–1 win over against Torino on 4 March 2007. In his first half of the season at Fiorentina, Kuzmanović went on to make three more appearances.

In his first full season at Fiorentina, Kuzmanović managed to established himself in the first team and then scored his first goal for the club against Catania on 17 February 2008. In the UEFA Cup campaign knockout stage in the quarter-final against Everton, Kuzmanović scored his first European goal in a 2–0 win in the first leg. In the second leg, Everton managed to catch up with a 2–0 win, resulting an extra time and the game played on the penalties, which Fiorentina won 4–2. Kuzmanović ended the 2007–08 season making forty–eight appearances and scoring two times in all competitions.

The following season, on 14 October 2008, Kuzmanović signed a contract with the club that would keep him until 2013. Kuzmanović ended the 2008–09 season, making forty–one appearances and scoring two times in all competitions.

During his time at the club, Kuzmanović went on to become an integral first team player for Fiorentina, notching up over 70 Serie A appearances and featuring in their successful European competition runs.

=== VfB Stuttgart ===
On 31 August 2009 on the transfer deadline, Kuzmanović signed a four-year contract with VfB Stuttgart worth £7million.

On 12 September 2009, Kuzmanović made his Stuttgart debut, playing 22 minutes, in a 3–1 loss against Hamburg. Kuzmanović also made his Champions League debut for Stuttgart in a 1–3 defeat at home to Sevilla on 20 October 2009 and later scored his first Champions League goal in the return leg when Sevilla and Stuttgart played a 1–1 draw. Then on 21 November 2009, Kuzmanović scored his first goal for Stuttgart in a 1–1 draw against Hertha BSC, but was sent–off later in the game. Kuzmanović established himself in the starting eleven, taking the first team place from Thomas Hitzlsperger and made thirty–four appearances and scoring five times in all competitions despite injury.

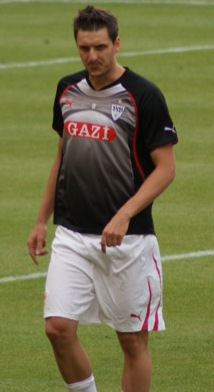
Kuzmanović warming up during training at VfB Stuttgart in August 2010.

Kuzmanović managed to regain his first team place and started the 2010–11 season well when he scored his first goal of the season, in a 7–0 thrash victory over Borussia Mönchengladbach on 18 September 2010, Kuzmanović’s performance soon attracted interests from Serie A clubs, but he played down rumours of leaving Stuttgart, insisting he was happy to stay at Stuttgart. In the round of 64, the second leg in the Europa League campaign against Benfica, Kuzmanović received a straight red card in stoppage time, as Stuttgart would not only lose for the second time against them, but being eliminated from the Europa League campaign. The 2010–11 season saw Kuzmanović making forty-seven appearances and scoring eleven times in all competitions.

In the 2011–12 season, transfer speculation to sign Kuzmanović continued when English side Chelsea had their 23 million bid turned down. Kuzmanović started the season by making seven appearances, including his first goal of the season as Stuttgart won 3–0 against Hannover 96 on 10 September 2011 before suffering a hamstring injury, which caused him to miss two matches. He then returned in mid-October and scored on his return on 22 October 2011, in a 2–2 draw against Nürnberg. Kuzmanović finished the 2011–12 season, making twenty–nine appearances and scoring six times in all competitions.

In the 2012–13 season, Kuzmanović had featured less at the start of the season, having suffered a torn muscle in his right thigh. On 24 September 2012, it was announced that Kuzmanović expected to leave the club at the end of the 2012–13 season after there were contract talks between the player and the club. After that, he was often playing out of position, both in substitution and starts. In December 2012, Kuzmanović's relationship with the club turned sour and beyond repair when contract talks broke down.

=== Internazionale ===
On 31 January 2013, Kuzmanović moved to Italian side Internazionale for an undisclosed fee.

Kuzmanović made his Internazionale debut on 3 February 2013, where he made his first start and provided the only goal in the game for Internazionale, as they lost 3–1 to AS Siena. Kuzmanović went on to establish himself in the first team, making thirteen appearances for the club.

However, in the 2013–14 season, under the new management of Walter Mazzarri, Kuzmanović was deployed only sparingly and spent most of the season on the substitute bench. and injured, making fifteen appearances for the club. With lack of first team opportunities, Kuzmanović attracted interests from Roma, but stayed at the club, stating he was happy at the club.

Then in the 2014–15 season Roberto Mancini was hired as the new Inter coach and under his management, Kuzmanović played more frequently. Kuzmanović played a role in both legs of the Europa League Qualification Round when he provided two assists in both games against Stjarnan. It was not until 29 October 2014 when he made his first league appearance of the 2014–15 season and provided the assist in the only goal of the game, in a 1–0 win over Sampdoria. Though he was placed on a loan list in January, he was taken off after the transfer window closed. Kuzmanović suffered an injury that kept out for the month. He finished the 2014–15 season, making twenty–five appearances and scoring once.

Ahead of the 2015–16 season, Kuzmanović's future at Inter Milan became uncertain after being linked with a move to Serie A clubs and Watford.

=== Return to FC Basel ===
==== First season ====
On 30 June 2015, Kuzmanović returned to FC Basel on a five-year deal. Upon returning to Basel after spending eight-years away, Kuzmanović said he wanted to stay at Basel for the rest of his career. After the announcement of Matías Delgado's captaincy, Kuzmanović was appointed as the club's vice–captain, alongside Marek Suchý.

Kuzmanović made his Basel debut in the opening game of the season, where he came on as a substitute for Delgado in the 63rd minute, in a 2–1 win over Vaduz. Kuzmanović suffered an injury when he tore his muscle in his right thigh, in a 3–1 win over Thun on 12 August 2015 and was sidelined for four weeks. After his return to the first team, Kuzmanović struggled to regain his first team place, due to strong performance from Taulant Xhaka and Mohamed Elneny and his return to the club became questionable.

With his first team opportunities limited, Kuzmanović was linked with a move back to Serie A, with Genoa, Bologna and Sampdoria and was expected to leave the club in the January transfer window. Another factor to leave the club was a dispute with manager Urs Fischer.

==== Loan to Udinese ====
On 21 January 2016, Basel announced that they had loaned out Kuzmanović to Udinese until the end of the season. This came after Kuzmanović was given permission to leave the club's training camp to join Udinese.

Kuzmanović made his Udinese debut in a 0–0 draw against Lazio on 31 January 2016. Since his return, Kuzmanović became a first team regular in midfield position, which he enjoyed playing and went on to make sixteen appearances, for the club. Despite being rumoured to join Udinese on a permanent basis for 5 million euro, Kuzmanović returned to his parent club instead.

==== Loan to Málaga ====
On 30 June 2016, Kuzmanović was loaned to La Liga side Málaga for one year. He made his Málaga debut in the opening game of the season, coming on as a 71st-minute substitute for goalscorer Juanpi in a 1–1 home draw against CA Osasuna.

==== After loan ====
Under trainer Marcel Koller Basel won the Swiss Cup in the 2018–19 season. In the first round, Basel beat FC Montlingen 3–0, in the second round Echallens Région 7–2 and in the round of 16 Winterthur 1–0. In the quarter-finals Sion were defeated 4–2 after extra time and in the semi-finals Zürich were defeated 3–1. All these games were played away from home. The final was held on 19 May 2019 in the Stade de Suisse Wankdorf Bern against Thun. Striker Albian Ajeti scored the first goal, Fabian Frei the second for Basel, then Dejan Sorgić netted a goal for Thun, but the end result was 2–1 for Basel. Kuzmanović played in four cup games and scored a goal in the semi-final against Zürich.

On 12 June 2020 the club announced that the contract with Kuzmanovic would not be prolonged. Between the years 2005 to 2007 and again from 2015 to 2020 Kuzmanovic played a total of 131 games for Basel scoring a total of 12 goals. 62 of these games were in the Swiss Super League, 12 in the Swiss Cup, two in the Champions League, 14 in the UEFA Europa League and 41 were friendly games. He scored five goals in the domestic league, three in the domestic cup, two in the UEFA Cup and the other two were scored during the test games. After that, Kuzmanović announced that he ended his playing career.

== International career ==
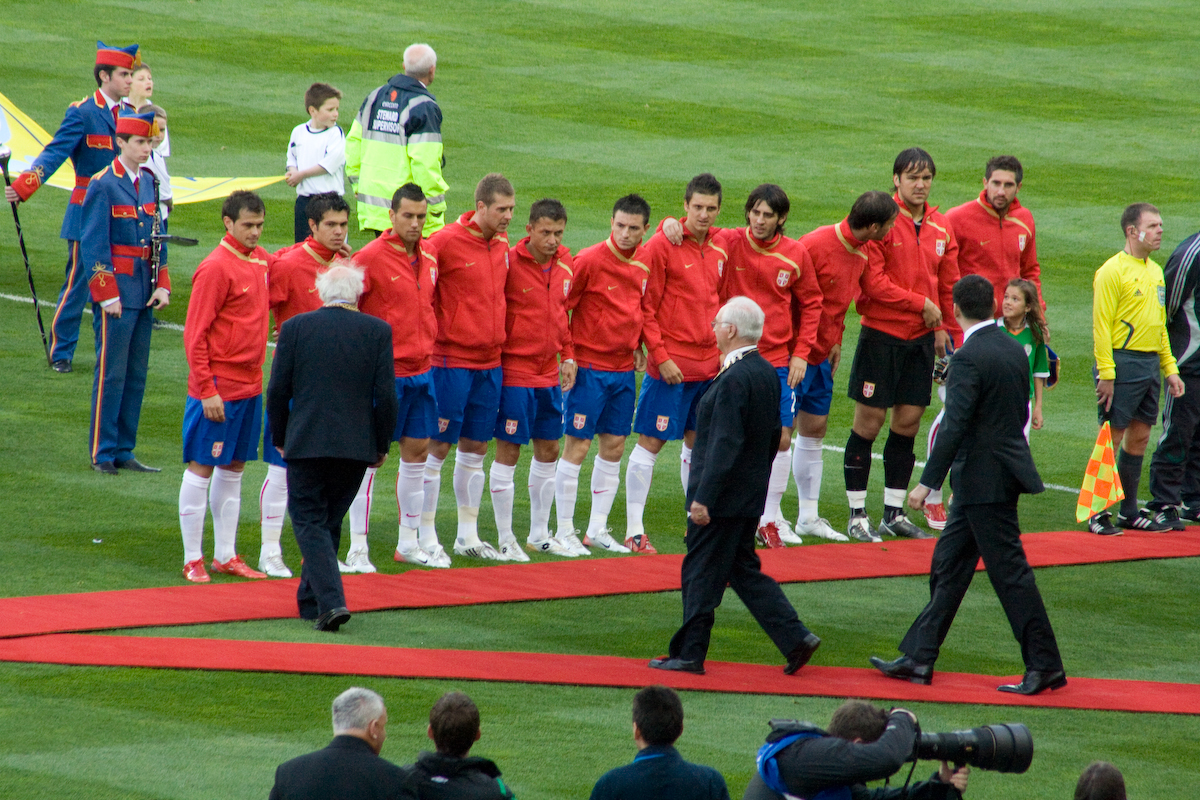
Kuzmanović (fifth from right) with the Serbia national team in Dublin in May 2008.

In early 2007, Serbian FA began talks with him about the possibility of playing for the Serbia national team and he accepted the call up to the squad against Kazakhstan and Portugal in March 2007. He scored his first two goals for Serbia in the away game versus Belgium in August 2007, but they weren't enough to get a point, since Serbia lost 3–2. Although Kuzmanović was born in Thun and played for Switzerland at youth level, he has decided to play for Serbia on the senior level, stating: "I'm Serbian and I want to give all for my country, it's a matter of what you feel in your heart and I must listen to it."

He played once at 2007 UEFA European Under-21 Football Championship qualifying for Switzerland U21 thus being ineligible to play for Serbia at the same campaign, which Serbia lost to the Netherlands in the final. He also played a friendly versus France U21 in February 2007 before he accepted the call-up from Serbia.

In the 2010 FIFA World Cup, Kuzmanović was among twenty–three players named in the Serbia squad for the World Cup. Then in a match between Serbia and Ghana, Kuzmanović conceded a penalty by handling the ball. Ghana scored and won the match 1–0. Despite this, Kuzmanović went on to appear in two more World Cup matches, though Serbia was eliminated in the group stage.

He earned a total of 50 caps (6 goals) and his final international was a November 2014 European Championship qualification match against Denmark.

== Career statistics ==
=== Club ===
As of 29 September 2019

Club	Season	League		Cup		Europe		Other		Total	
Club	Season	Apps	Goals	Apps	Goals	Apps	Goals	Apps	Goals	Apps	Goals
Basel	2004–05	0	0	1	0	0	0	0	0	1	0
Basel	2005–06	17	1	1	2	3	1	0	0	21	4
Basel	2006–07	17	3	3	0	8	2	0	0	28	5
Basel	Total	34	4	5	2	11	3	0	0	50	9
Fiorentina	2006–07	4	0	0	0	0	0	0	0	4	0
Fiorentina	2007–08	34	1	2	0	12	1	0	0	48	2
Fiorentina	2008–09	32	2	1	0	8	0	0	0	41	2
Fiorentina	Total	70	3	3	0	20	1	0	0	93	4
VfB Stuttgart	2009–10	26	3	2	0	6	2	0	0	34	5
VfB Stuttgart	2010–11	32	9	3	0	12	2	0	0	47	11
VfB Stuttgart	2011–12	26	5	3	1	0	0	0	0	29	6
VfB Stuttgart	2012–13	12	0	2	0	3	0	0	0	17	0
VfB Stuttgart	Total	96	17	10	1	21	4	0	0	127	22
Internazionale	2012–13	13	0	1	0	0	0	0	0	14	0
Internazionale	2013–14	15	0	1	0	0	0	0	0	16	0
Internazionale	2014–15	14	0	1	0	10	1	0	0	25	1
Internazionale	Total	42	0	3	0	10	1	0	0	55	1
Basel	2015–16	12	0	2	0	4	0	0	0	18	0
Basel	2018–19	13	1	3	1	0	0	0	0	16	2
Basel	2019–20	3	0	1	0	0	0	0	0	4	0
Basel	Total	28	1	6	1	4	0	0	0	38	2
Udinese (loan)	2015–16	16	0	0	0	0	0	0	0	16	0
Udinese (loan)	Total	16	0	0	0	0	0	0	0	16	0
Málaga (loan)	2016–17	4	0	0	0	0	0	0	0	4	0
Málaga (loan)	2017–18	8	0	0	0	0	0	0	0	8	0
Málaga (loan)	Total	12	0	0	0	0	0	0	0	12	0
Career total		298	25	27	4	68	9	0	0	393	38

=== International ===
Serbia national team
Year	Apps	Goals
2007	7	2
2008	8	0
2009	9	1
2010	11	1
2011	8	1
2012	3	1
2013	1	0
2014	3	0
Total	50	6

==== International goals ====
Zdravko Kuzmanović: International goals
No.	Date	Venue	Opponent	Score	Result	Competition
1.	22 August 2007	King Baudouin Stadium, Brussels, Belgium	Belgium	2–1	3–2	UEFA Euro 2008 qualifying
2.	22 August 2007	King Baudouin Stadium, Brussels, Belgium	Belgium	3–2	3–2	UEFA Euro 2008 qualifying
3.	10 October 2009	Red Star Stadium, Belgrade, Serbia	Romania	3–0	5–0	2010 FIFA World Cup qualifying
4.	3 March 2010	Stade 5 Juillet 1962, Algiers, Algeria	Algeria	0–2	0–3	Friendly
5.	6 September 2011	Stadion FK Partizan, Belgrade, Serbia	Faroe Islands	3–1	3–1	UEFA Euro 2012 qualifying
6.	28 February 2012	Tsirion Stadium, Limassol, Cyprus	Armenia	0–1	0–2	Friendly

== Honours ==
Basel

- Swiss Cup: 2018–19

== Personal ==
Hailing from the Skugrić village near Modriča, Kuzmanović's father Ljubo played association football professionally: starting locally in the Gradačac-based FK Zvijezda before transferring abroad to a Berlin-based club and eventually ending his career in Switzerland with FC Thun at which point he continued living there and started a family. Kuzmanović's paternal grandfather had previously also played for the lower league FK Zvijezda.

=== Marriages and children ===
In 2010, while playing for VfB Stuttgart, Kuzmanović began dating Marina Ružić, Salzburg-born professional translator of Serbian parentage. The couple married in May 2012 and had a daughter, Sofija, in 2013. Residing in Stuttgart, the family moved to Basel in summer 2015 as Kuzmanović transferred back to the city. Their second child, daughter Anastasija, was born in Salzburg in July 2015. The couple divorced in 2018.

By February 2019, Kuzmanović was dating Bogdana Ilić whom he married soon afterwards. She has since become active as a social media influencer. Initially residing in Switzerland, the couple had a child, son Nemanja, in February 2020. Shortly after the birth of their child, the family moved to Serbia. Their second child, daughter Natalija, was born in December 2021.
