= Richard Vanigli =

Italian footballer

Personal information
- Full name: Richard Vanigli
- Date of birth: June 1, 1971 (age 55)
- Place of birth: Forlì, Italy
- Height: 1.77 m (5 ft 10 in)
- Position: Centre back

Team information
- Current team: Catania (assistant coach)

Youth career
- 1988–1989: Forlì
- 1989–1991: AC Milan

Senior career*
Years	Team	Apps	(Gls)
1991–1993	Varese	61	(0)
1993–1996	Cosenza	87	(0)
1996–1997	Lecce	23	(0)
1997–1998	Castel di Sangro	23	(0)
1998–2004	Livorno	186	(4)
2004–2008	Empoli	64	(0)
2008–2009	Ancona	26	(2)
2009–2012	Forlì	43	(1)
Total		513	(7)

Managerial career
- 2014–2015: Forlì
- * Club domestic league appearances and goals

Richard Vanigli (born 1 June 1971 in Forlì) is an Italian former footballer, currently in charge as Cristiano Lucarelli's assistant coach at Catania.

== Playing career ==
A hard-working centre-back, he started playing in the lower leagues, making his Serie B debut with Cosenza in 1993, and his Serie A debut with Lecce in 1996.

In 1998 he joined Livorno, playing six years for the Tuscans throughout three different divisions (from Serie C1 to Serie A). In 2004 he left Livorno for Empoli, winning a second personal Serie A promotion on his first season.

On 19 February 2006, in Empoli's match against Roma, Richard Vanigli fouled Francesco Totti, who suffered a fracture of his left fibula and ligament damage. Totti had to make an amazing quick recovery to participate in the victorious 2006 World Cup, in just about 2 months.

Vanigli is therefore mostly remembered in the Italian football scene for putting Totti's career at risk.

In 2009, he left professional football to move back at hometown club Forlì in the Eccellenza league.

== Coaching career ==
After retirement, he stayed at Forlì as youth coach, and then also as head coach from December 2014 to March 2015.

He successively followed former teammate (turned manager) Cristiano Lucarelli, serving as his assistant at Tuttocuoio, Messina and most recently Catania.
