= Giacomo Tedesco =

Italian footballer and manager

Personal information
- Date of birth: February 1, 1976 (age 50)
- Place of birth: Palermo, Italy
- Height: 1.75 m (5 ft 9 in)
- Position: Midfielder

Senior career*
Years	Team	Apps	(Gls)
1994–1997	Palermo	67	(3)
1997–2002	Salernitana	133	(13)
2000–2001	→ Napoli (loan)	14	(0)
2003	Cosenza	15	(1)
2003–2007	Reggina	121	(5)
2007–2009	Catania	60	(4)
2009	Bologna	8	(0)
2010–2011	Reggina	39	(0)
2011–2013	Trapani	49	(3)

Managerial career
- 2014–2015: Reggina U19
- 2015: Reggina
- 2018: Igea Virtus
- 2018–2019: Igea Virtus
- * Club domestic league appearances and goals

Giacomo Tedesco (born February 1, 1976) is an Italian former football midfielder and football manager.

== Club career ==
Born in Palermo, Tedesco started his professional career with his hometown club U.S. Città di Palermo in 1994. He remained in the Sicilian capital for 3 seasons, making nearly 70 total appearances and scoring 3 goals. In 1997, he moved to Salernitana, where he would go on to make 133 appearances scoring 13 goals between 1997 and 2002. Although he was loaned out to Napoli, for the 2000–2001 season. In six months with the southern Italian club, he played in 14 total games. In 2003, he briefly moved to Cosenza where he scored a single goal in 14 appearances. Later in 2003, he was sold to Serie A side Reggina Calcio, where he would spend a solid 4 years in Calabria, all in Italy's top flight. He scored 5 goals for Reggina in a total of over 120 appearances. In 2007, despite having a successful spell in Calabria, Tedesco transferred to Sicilian side Calcio Catania. Since joining Catania, he has made over 50 appearances scoring 4 goals in just two seasons. Under former coaches, Walter Zenga and Silvio Baldini Tedesco was consistently part of the starting XI and is always a hard working consistent performer on the left wing. On 9 July 2009, Tedesco was very surprisingly sold to Bologna FC who have signed the midfielder from Calcio Catania on a two-year deal. On 14 January 2010, Tedesco was sent back to Reggina in an exchange deal for Antonio Buscè.

== Coaching career ==
From August 2014, Tedesco became the manager of the Beretti team (U-19) of Reggina. On 20 April 2015, he was promoted to the first team manager following the departure of Roberto Alberti. At the end of the season, he left the club.

After almost three and a half years without a job, Igea Virtus appointed Tedesco as their new manager on 24 October 2018. After zero victories in his first six games, he was fired less than one month later on 30 November. However, he was re-appointed on 7 December 2018. He was fired again on 28 January 2019.

== Personal life ==
Tedesco has two brothers who were also footballers: Giovanni, formerly of Palermo and Perugia among others, and Salvatore, who mostly spent his career in the lower ranks of professional football.
