= Jan Hable =

Czech footballer

Personal information
- Date of birth: 4 January 1989 (age 37)
- Place of birth: Hradec Králové, Czechoslovakia
- Height: 1.89 m (6 ft 2 1/2 in)
- Position: Midfielder

Senior career*
Years	Team	Apps	(Gls)
2006–2007	Hradec Králové	4	(0)
2007–2009	Fiorentina	0	(0)
2009	→ Baník Ostrava (loan)	9	(0)
2009–2011	Ascoli	1	(0)
2010–2011	→ Kerkyra (loan)	20	(0)
2011–2013	Kerkyra	31	(0)
2013	Baník Ostrava	19	(0)
2014–2016	Hradec Králové	3	(0)

International career
2004–2005	Czech Republic U16	7	(0)
2005–2006	Czech Republic U17	16	(0)
2006	Czech Republic U18	6	(0)
2007–2008	Czech Republic U19	11	(0)
2009	Czech Republic U21	1	(0)
Medal record
Men's football
Representing Czech Republic
UEFA European Under-17 Championship
Runner-up	2006 Luxembourg
- * Club domestic league appearances and goals

Jan Hable (born 4 January 1989) is a Czech former footballer, who played in the Czech First League for Baník Ostrava and Hradec Králové.

== Career ==
Hable started his career at FC Hradec Králové before moving on 2 June 2007 to Serie A club, ACF Fiorentina.

On 23 January 2009 the Czech midfielder was playing, still on loan, for Banik Ostrava and on 4 January 2010 ACF Fiorentina declared that the Czech came back from the loan.

On 28 January 2010 he was transferred to Ascoli in co-ownership deal.

== International ==
Hable has played at various underage levels for the Czech Republic.
