= Franco Semioli =

Italian footballer (born 1980)

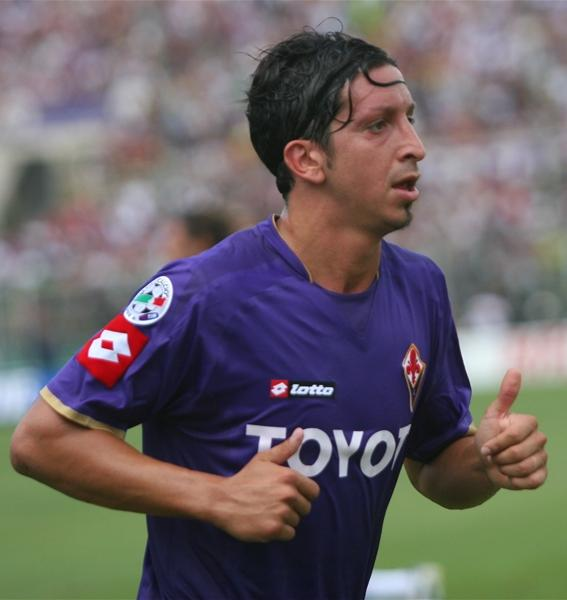

Personal information
- Date of birth: 20 June 1980 (age 46)
- Place of birth: Cirié, Italy
- Height: 1.77 m (5 ft 10 in)
- Position: Right winger

Youth career
- Torino

Senior career*
Years	Team	Apps	(Gls)
1998–2000	Torino	2	(0)
1999–2000	→ Salernitana (loan)	24	(0)
2000–2003	Internazionale	0	(0)
2000–2002	→ Torino (loan)	19	(1)
2002	→ Ternana (loan)	13	(0)
2002–2003	→ Vicenza (loan)	31	(3)
2003–2007	Chievo	133	(10)
2007–2009	Fiorentina	42	(2)
2009–2012	Sampdoria	51	(2)
2012–2013	Vicenza	29	(1)
2014–2016	Chieri	54	(6)

International career
1998	Italy U17	5	(3)
1998–1999	Italy U18	12	(6)
1999–2001	Italy U20	7	(1)
2006–2007	Italy	3	(0)

Managerial career
- 2022–2023: Novara
- * Club domestic league appearances and goals

Franco Semioli (Italian pronunciation: [ˈfraŋko seˈmjɔːli]; born 20 June 1980) is an Italian football coach and former player. A midfielder, he played as a right winger.

He was most recently head coach of Serie C club Novara.

== Club career ==
=== Early years with Torino and Inter and loan spells ===
Semioli, a Piedmontese, made his professional debut playing for local club Torino during the 1998–99 season. Semioli and his teammate Riccardo Fissore were then signed by Internazionale in June 2000, in a co-ownership deal for a total of 6 billion lire; as part of the deal, Fabio Galante moved to Turin for 5.1 billion lire. Semioli spent seasons back on loan with Torino, and on loan at Ternana and Vicenza, while Torino bought back Fissore for 2 billion lire in June 2001; in total, Inter received 1.1 billion lire in net cash from Torino for Galante.

=== Chievo ===
In June 2003 Internazionale bought the remain half from Torino, and then joint-owned with Chievo in July for €1.05 million, as part of the loan fee of Luciano. Chievo got full ownership in June 2005 for €500,000 as part of Júlio César's deal.

He became a representative players for Chievo, and was a renown player in 2005–06 season contributing 2 goals and 12 assists.

=== Fiorentina ===
In July 2007 Semioli signed for Fiorentina for a fee of €7.3 million on a four-year contract.

He scored Fiorentina's first UEFA Cup goal against Groningen and scored crucial goals against Atalanta and Parma which allowed Fiorentina to surpass AC Milan for the final Champions League spot. In the 2008–09 season Semioli was widely believed to be on his way out because of the tactic change and the arrival of players such as Stevan Jovetic. However, after season ending injuries to Adrian Mutu and Mario Santana, Semioli found his way back onto the first team, and was a valuable asset to Gilardino, providing him with many crosses and being a terror on the wings.

=== Sampdoria ===
Following the arrival of Marco Marchionni to Fiorentina, in July 2009, for €4.5 million, it was confirmed that Semioli was transferred to Sampdoria as a four-year deal, for €4 million fee in August, rejoining his former coach at Chievo, Luigi Delneri. Franco scored his first goal 13 February with a header against his former team Fiorentina which gave Bluecerchiati the lead.

=== Vicenza ===
After three years at Sampdoria, Semioli was transferred to former club Vicenza in a deal that included Sampdoria teammates Marco Padalino and Zsolt Laczkó moving in the same direction, all for free.

== International career ==
Semioli represented the Italy Under-18 team at the 1999 UEFA European Under-18 Football Championship, where they reached the final, only to lose to the Portugal Under-18 side.

In the 2006 FIFA World Cup he was one of the four backup players for the 23-men main squad chosen by manager Marcello Lippi to step in for any possible injuries. However, he was not called up to the final 23-man squad and thus never received a winners medal. On 16 August 2006, Semioli made his Italy national team senior debut in a 2–0 friendly defeat against Croatia, in Livorno, under Roberto Donadoni.

Semioli was recalled to the Italy squad for the final Euro 2008 qualifier with Scotland. In total he made 3 appearances for Italy between 2006 and 2007.

== Coaching career ==
After retirement as a professional footballer, Semioli obtained the UEFA A Licence, which made him eligible to start his career as a head coach in Lega Pro clubs.

After a short sting as assistant coach of Chieri, in 2018 Semioli signed for Pro Vercelli as a youth coach for the Under-17 players. In 2019, he moved to Torino as a youth coach.

On 28 July 2022, Semioli was announced as the new Under-19 Primavera coach of Novara. On 1 December 2022, he was promoted to head coach, taking charge of the first team in the Serie C league. He was however dismissed on 16 January 2023.

== Career statistics ==
=== International ===
National team	Club	Season	Apps	Goals
Italy	Chievo	2006–07	2	0
Italy	Fiorentina	2007–08	1	0
Total			3	0

International appearances and goals
1.	16 August 2006	Livorno, Italy	Croatia	0–2	0	Friendly
2.	6 September 2006	Saint-Denis, France	France	1–3	0	UEFA Euro 2008 qualifying
3.	17 October 2007	Siena, Italy	South Africa	2–0	0	Friendly
