= Daniele Cacia =

Italian footballer (born 1983)

Personal information
- Date of birth: 23 August 1983 (age 43)
- Place of birth: Catanzaro, Italy
- Height: 1.84 m (6 ft 0 in)
- Position: Striker

Youth career
- 1996–2000: Piacenza

Senior career*
Years	Team	Apps	(Gls)
2000–2007	Piacenza	91	(35)
2002	→ Ternana (loan)	0	(0)
2003	→ SPAL (loan)	3	(0)
2005	→ Pistoiese (loan)	12	(8)
2008	Fiorentina	3	(0)
2008–2012	Lecce	22	(2)
2009–2010	→ Reggina (loan)	27	(4)
2010–2011	→ Piacenza (loan)	34	(17)
2011–2012	→ Padova (loan)	33	(11)
2012–2014	Hellas Verona	52	(24)
2014–2015	Bologna	38	(11)
2015–2017	Ascoli	67	(29)
2017–2018	Cesena	16	(3)
2018–2019	Novara	32	(12)
2019	Piacenza	14	(1)

International career
2001	Italy U18	1	(0)
2001	Italy U19	6	(0)
- * Club domestic league appearances and goals as of 8 December 2019

Daniele Cacia (born 23 August 1983) is an Italian professional footballer who plays as a striker. He is a former Italy Under 19 international.

== Club career ==
=== Piacenza ===
Born in Catanzaro, and coming through the youth ranks at Piacenza. He made his debut for Piacenza during the 2000–01 Serie B season, against Crotone, on 9 March 2001, at less than 18 years of age. He was loaned to Ternana for the 2002–03 season, where he never played after fracturing his fibula. After a loan spell at SPAL, he returned to Piacenza for the 2003–04, with which he made 13 appearances, scoring his first goal in a 3–2 home loss to Napoli. He joined Serie C1 side Pistoiese on loan and scored 8 goals in 12 games.

Cacia returned to Piacenza for the 2005–06, and was the team's leading goalscorer, with 18 goals in 37 games. He repeated the feat during the 2006–07 season, scoring 14 goals in 28 games; however his season was cut short when he suffered a broken ankle against Crotone.

=== Fiorentina co-ownership ===
In summer 2007 half of his contractual rights was sold to Fiorentina for €4.5 million, due to injury, he played for Piacenza until winter transfer period, when he moved to Florence in January 2008. Caica made his Fiorentina debut on 16 January in the second leg of the Italian Cup against Ascoli.

Cacia who faced competition for places from Luca Toni, Christian Vieri, Giampaolo Pazzini and Adrian Mutu, only played six games for Fiorentina in all competitions during the 2007–08 season, with his only goal for the club coming in the UEFA Cup against Rosenborg BK in 2008.

In June 2008 he was bought back by Piacenza for €2.8 million.

=== Lecce and loan moves ===
Cacia signed for U.S. Lecce in Serie A in July 2008 after acquiring half of his registration rights from Piacenza for €3 million. He was given the number 9 shirt at the club. On 22 February 2009, he was injured in the match against Lazio after fracturing his fibula. On 28 February, he underwent surgery in Pavia. He scored 2 goals in 22 games during his debut season at the club.

After returning from injury, he was loaned to Reggina on 28 August 2009, where he played 27 times scoring just 4 goals.

A loan move in 2010 back to his old club Piacenza saw Cacia recapture his goal scoring form, on 14 August 2010 Cacia scored a hat trick in a 5–3 victory in the Italian Cup second qualifying round against Virtus Lanciano. Cacia ended the season scoring 21 goals in all competitions and finish third in the scoring charts in Serie B for the 2010–11 season. In June 2011 Lecce acquired Cacia outright. After impressing back at Piacenza, Cacia joined Padova on loan in 2011, scoring 11 league goals.

=== Hellas Verona ===
In 2012, Cacia joined Hellas Verona in Serie B on a permanent deal. During the 2012–13 season Cacia scored 24 goals in Serie B making him the top goal scorer in the division and helping earn Hellas Verona promotion to Serie A as runners up behind U.S. Sassuolo Calcio.

However, after the arrival of former Italian International Luca Toni during the summer of the 2013–14 season, Cacia found his first team place more limited in Serie A making only 13 appearances, with 10 of those coming off the bench as a substitute.

On 13 June 2014, Cacia announced he would be leaving Hellas Verona in search of more regular football, On 27 June it was revealed that Cacia was still a target for Leeds United owner Massimo Cellino.

=== Bologna ===
On 5 August 2014, Cacia signed for Serie B club Bologna on a free transfer. He wore no.9 shirt from departing Rolando Bianchi. In his first season, he scored 11 goals in 38 games helping Bologna gain promotion to Serie A via the play-offs by beating Pescara, qualifying as the highest place team after a 1–1 aggregate draw in the two legged final.

=== Ascoli ===
On 11 September 2015, Cacia was signed by Serie B newcomer Ascoli on a two-year contract.

=== Return to Piacenza ===
On 18 July 2019, he returned to Piacenza on a one-year contract. On 12 December 2019, the contract was terminated by mutual consent.

== International career ==
Cacia was capped by the Italy under-19 national team in 2001, making his debut against England on 14 June in a 4–1 win. The last of his six Italy U19 caps came on 24 November 2001, in the team's 4–0 victory against Moldova.

== Career statistics ==
=== Club ===
As of 19 January 2014

Appearances and goals by club, season and competition
Club	Season	League			Coppa Italia		Europe		Other		Total	
Club	Season	Division	League	Goals	Apps	Goals	Apps	Goals	Apps	Goals	Apps	Goals
Piacenza	2000–01	Serie B	1	0	0	0	–		–		1	0
Piacenza	2001–02	Serie A	0	0	0	0	–		–		0	0
Piacenza	Total		1	0	0	0	0	0	0	0	1	0
Ternana	2002–03	Serie B	0	0	0	0	–		–		0	0
SPAL	2002–03	Serie C1	3	0	–		–		–		3	0
Piacenza	2003–04	Serie B	13	1	0	0	–		–		13	1
Piacenza	2004–05	Serie B	6	0	0	0	–		–		6	0
Piacenza	Total		19	1	0	0	0	0	0	0	19	1
Pistoiese	2004–05	Serie C1	12	8	–		–		–		12	8
Piacenza	2005–06	Serie B	37	18	3	3	–		–		40	21
Piacenza	2006–07	Serie B	28	14	2	2	–		–		30	16
Piacenza	2007–08	Serie B	6	2	0	0	–		–		6	2
Piacenza	Total		71	34	5	5	0	0	0	0	76	39
Fiorentina	2007–08	Serie A	3	0	2	0	2 (Note: Appearances in UEFA Cup)	1	–		7	1
Lecce	2008–09	Serie A	22	2	1	0	–		–		23	2
Reggina	2009–10	Serie B	27	4	0	0	–		–		27	4
Piacenza	2010–11	Serie B	34	17	2	3	–		2 (Note: Appearances in league play-offs)	1	38	21
Padova	2011–12	Serie B	33	11	–		–		–		33	11
Hellas Verona	2012–13	Serie B	39	24	2	1	–		–		41	25
Hellas Verona	2013–14	Serie A	10	0	2	0	–		–		12	0
Hellas Verona	Total		49	24	4	1	0	0	0	0	53	25
Career total			274	100	14	9	2	1	2	1	292	110

== Honours ==
Piacenza

- Serie B promotion: 2000–01

Hellas Verona

- Serie B promotion: 2012–13

Individual

- Serie B Capocannoniere (Golden Boot Award): 2012–13 (24 Goals)
