= Alex (footballer, born 1989) =

Brazilian footballer

Personal information
- Full name: Alex Costa dos Santos Marie Havior Conetic
- Date of birth: 29 January 1989 (age 37)
- Place of birth: Salvador (BA), Brazil
- Height: 1.87 m (6 ft 2 in)
- Position: Defender

Team information
- Current team: Rio Branco

Senior career*
Years	Team	Apps	(Gls)
2006	Lokomotiv Plovdiv	11	(0)
2007–2009	Fiorentina	0	(0)
2009–2011	Eupen	49	(1)
2011–2012	Boussu Dour	12	(0)
2013	Roma Apucarana		
2014	Operário	7	(0)
2014–2015	Cascavel		
2020–	Rio Branco	1	(0)
- * Club domestic league appearances and goals as of 19:40, 10 February 2021 (UTC)

Alex Costa dos Santos or just Alex (born 29 January 1989 in Salvador, Bahia) is a Brazilian footballer who plays as a defender for Rio Branco.

== Career ==
Alex Costa signed for Fiorentina on 31 January 2007 at age of 18.

In June 2009, he left for Eupen.
