= Massimo Gobbi =

Italian footballer

Personal information
- Date of birth: 31 October 1980 (age 45)
- Place of birth: Milan, Italy
- Height: 1.83 m (6 ft 0 in)
- Positions: Left back; midfielder

Youth career
- 1991–1998: AC Milan

Senior career*
Years	Team	Apps	(Gls)
1998–1999	Pro Sesto	6	(0)
1999–2004	Treviso	51	(5)
2001–2002	→ Giugliano (loan)	33	(5)
2002–2003	→ AlbinoLeffe (loan)	30	(7)
2004–2006	Cagliari	71	(5)
2006–2010	Fiorentina	81	(2)
2010–2015	Parma	155	(4)
2015–2018	Chievo	88	(1)
2018–2019	Parma	16	(0)
Total		531	(29)

International career
2006	Italy	1	(0)
- * Club domestic league appearances and goals

Massimo Gobbi (Italian pronunciation: [ˈmassimo ˈɡɔbbi]; born 31 October 1980) is an Italian retired footballer who played as a defender or as a midfielder.

== Club career ==
Born in Milan, Gobbi started his senior career in fourth-tier Serie C2 club Pro Sesto in 1998.

=== Treviso ===
He moved to second-tier Serie B club Treviso in 1999, from where he was loaned out to Giugliano (Serie C2) and AlbinoLeffe (Serie C1). He returned to Treviso in 2003, where he got his breakthrough. He played 44 of 46 games for the club during the 2003–04 Serie B season, after which he moved to the newly promoted club Cagliari Calcio in the top-flight Serie A championship.

He made his Serie A debut on 12 September 2004, in Cagliari's 1–0 win over Bologna, and played 71 of Cagliari's 76 Serie A games over the next two seasons.

=== Fiorentina ===
In June 2006, Gobbi was bought back by Treviso but sold to Fiorentina along with Reginaldo on 24 June, and Treviso signed Gianni Guigou as part of the deal. At that time Gobbi was valued €4.3 million (costed Viola €4.54 million), while Guigou was valued €40,000. (but made Viola received an extra cost saving of €200,000) He scored his first goal for the Fiorentina against Juventus on 1 March 2007.

=== Parma ===
On 1 July 2010, he became a free agent, before joining Parma on 18 August 2010. Initially deployed in his natural role as a central midfielder, Gobbi's first season at the club saw him become a regular as a left-back from December 2010 onwards as a consequence of Luca Antonelli's January 2011 departure.

His contract was renewed several times, with his last contract due to expire on 30 June 2015. However, he was released few days earlier due to the bankruptcy of Parma.

=== Chievo ===
On 30 June 2015, Gobbi signed a two-year contract with Chievo on a free transfer. He signed a one-year contract on 3 July 2017.

=== Parma ===
On 14 July 2018, Gobbi signed a one-year contract with Serie A side Parma, he returned after 3 years.

Gobbi retired at the end of the 2018–19 season.

== International career ==
Immediately after joining Fiorentina, Gobbi was called up for the Italy national football team by manager Roberto Donadoni. He made his senior national team debut in a 2–0 friendly defeat against Croatia in Livorno, on 16 August 2006, coming on as a substitute for Massimo Ambrosini in the 75th minute.
