= Fabio Liverani =

Italian football manager and former player

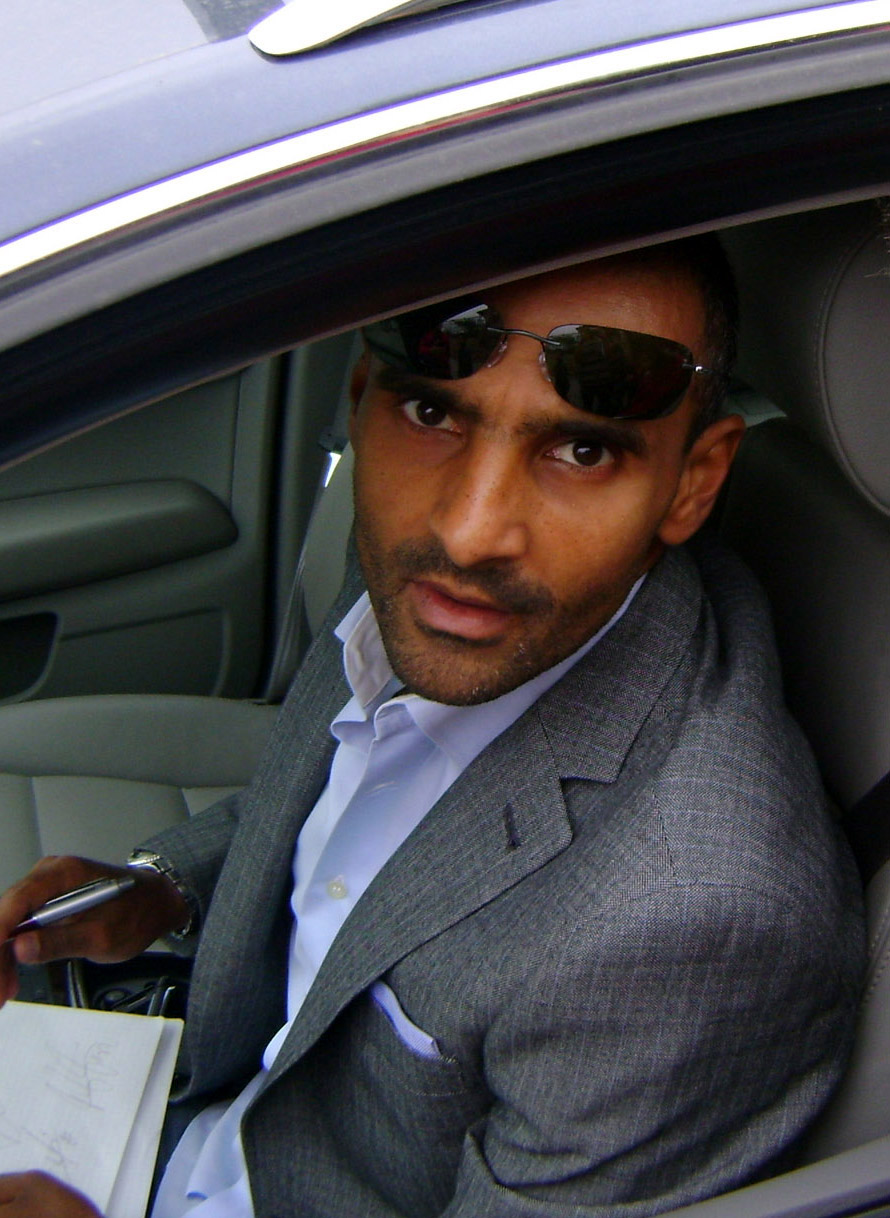
- Liverani in 2009

Personal information
- Full name: Fabio Liverani
- Date of birth: 29 April 1976 (age 50)
- Place of birth: Rome, Italy
- Height: 1.75 m (5 ft 9 in)
- Position: Central midfielder

Youth career
- 1994–1995: Palermo
- 1995–1996: Napoli
- 1996: Cagliari

Senior career*
Years	Team	Apps	(Gls)
1996	Nocerina	2	(0)
1997–2000	Viterbese	104	(18)
2000–2001	Perugia	32	(3)
2001–2006	Lazio	126	(6)
2006–2008	Fiorentina	64	(1)
2008–2011	Palermo	66	(0)
2011	Lugano	0	(0)
Total		394	(28)

International career
2001–2006	Italy	3	(0)

Managerial career
- 2013: Genoa
- 2014–2015: Leyton Orient
- 2017: Ternana
- 2017–2020: Lecce
- 2020–2021: Parma
- 2022: Cagliari
- 2024: Salernitana
- 2025–2026: Ternana
- * Club domestic league appearances and goals

Fabio Liverani (Italian pronunciation: [ˈfaːbjo liveˈraːni]; born 29 April 1976) is an Italian football manager and former midfielder.

He made 288 Serie A appearances across 12 seasons, representing Perugia, Lazio, Fiorentina and Palermo. He was the first black player for the Italy national team, playing three matches from 2001 to 2006.

In 2013, Liverani began his managerial career with a brief spell at top-flight club Genoa. He also managed the English club Leyton Orient and the Serie B club Ternana before taking Lecce to two consecutive promotions to the top flight.

== Club career ==
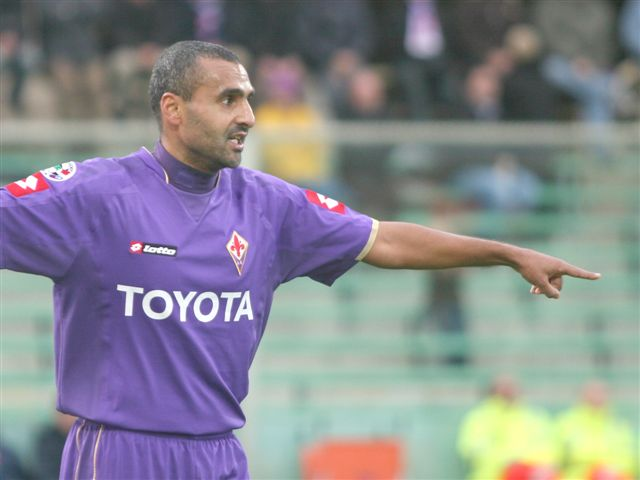
Liverani playing for Fiorentina in 2008

Liverani was born in Rome, Italy, to a Somali mother and an Italian father. He made his professional footballing debut with Viterbese of Serie C2 in 1996–97. He transferred to Perugia in the 2000–01 season. From 2001 to 2006, Liverani played for Lazio in Italy's Serie A. He was part of their team that won the Coppa Italia in 2004, defeating Juventus 4–2 on aggregate.

The 2006 season saw Liverani move to Fiorentina. He played a total of two seasons with the team, including the Viola' team's 2007–08 Serie A campaign, which ended with Fiorentina securing fourth place and a spot in the third qualifying round of the 2008–09 UEFA Champions League. Fiorentina and Liverani parted company the following season.

In May 2008, Liverani signed a three-year contract with Palermo, being also appointed team captain. Liverani was forced to miss the first three months of the 2009–10 season due to a serious injury that he had sustained on May, and broke back into the first team only on November, then being replaced as permanent team captain by Fabrizio Miccoli. In his first game as a regular, against Chievo, the first game of new head coach Delio Rossi in charge of the team, Liverani went on to be sent off during the game.

On 30 August 2011, he moved to Lugano, signing a two-year contract. Liverani never played for the Swiss, and rescinded his contract by mutual consent later on November.

== International career ==
On 25 April 2001, Liverani became the first black Italian footballer to play internationally with the Italy national team, making his debut with the Azzurri in a friendly match against South Africa in Perugia, under the management of Giovanni Trapattoni; the match ended in a 1–0 victory for the Italians.

On 16 August 2006, he was again summoned to start for the Italy national team in a friendly in Livorno against Croatia by the team's new coach, Roberto Donadoni; the match ended in a 2–0 loss. In total he made three appearances for Italy.

== Style of play ==
In spite of his lack of pace, agility, stamina or defensive skills, Liverani was a highly creative, reliable and quick-thinking player, who was known in particular for his technique, vision, range of distribution and precise passing with his left foot, which enabled him to create chances for teammates, and made him an excellent assist provider. Due to his skills and ability to set the tempo of his team's play in midfield, he usually operated in the centre or in front of the back-line, where he functioned as a deep-lying playmaker in midfield. In addition to his playmaking abilities as a footballer, he also stood out for his mentality and leadership, both on and off the pitch.

== Managerial career ==
=== Genoa ===
Following his retirement, Liverani was offered a position as youth coach at Genoa, in charge of the Allievi Regionali B squad, which he accepted on 15 November 2011.

On 7 June 2013, Genoa president Enrico Preziosi announced the appointment of Liverani as new first team manager in place of Davide Ballardini. He was sacked on 29 September after one win in his seven Serie A games in charge, and replaced by Gian Piero Gasperini.

=== Leyton Orient ===
On 8 December 2014, Liverani was appointed as manager of English League One team, Leyton Orient on a 2 1/2-year contract replacing Mauro Milanese who returned to his role as Sporting Director after eight matches in charge. Following their relegation to League Two, Liverani left the club by mutual consent in May 2015.

=== Ternana ===
On 6 March 2017, Liverani was appointed as manager of Serie B team, Ternana replacing Carmine Gautieri who was sacked after gaining only three points in seven matches. Ternana was last with only 23 points in 29 matches, but he gained 26 points in 13 games to avoid direct relegation as well as play-outs. At the end of the season, with the club under new ownership, Liverani's contract was not renewed.

=== Lecce ===
On 17 September 2017, Liverani was appointed manager of Lecce, with whom he achieved two direct promotions from Serie C to Serie A, thus bringing the Salento club back to the Italian top-tier league after seven years. Lecce made it to the last day of the 2019–20 season, before being relegated with a 4–3 home loss to Parma. On 19 August 2020, Liverani was sacked.

=== Parma ===
On 28 August 2020, Liverani was appointed manager of Parma on a two-year contract, after the dismissal of Roberto D'Aversa. On 7 January 2021, after four straight losses, Liverani was sacked.

=== Cagliari ===
On 8 June 2022, Liverani was unveiled as the new head coach of Cagliari, following the club's relegation to Serie B.

On 20 December 2022, Liverani was dismissed from his coaching duties following a 1–2 loss at Palermo and a disappointing first half of the season with Cagliari in fourteenth place in the league table.

=== Salernitana ===
On 11 February 2024, Liverani was appointed new head coach of the bottom-placed Serie A club Salernitana until the end of the season.

=== Second stint at Ternana ===
On 1 April 2025, Liverani was named the new head coach of Serie C promotion hopefuls Ternana, replacing Ignazio Abate, returning to the Rossoverdi eight years after his first stint at the club. He has been dismissed on 16 March 2026.

== Managerial statistics ==
As of 18 March 2024

Managerial record by team and tenure
Team	Nat	From	To	Record							
Team	Nat	From	To	G	W	D	L	GF	GA	GD	Win %
Genoa	(Italy)	7 June 2013	29 September 2013	7	1	2	4	7	12	−5	14.29
Leyton Orient	(England)	8 December 2014	13 May 2015	27	8	6	13	35	40	−5	29.63
Ternana	(Italy)	6 March 2017	30 June 2017	13	8	2	3	19	11	+8	61.54
Lecce	(Italy)	17 September 2017	19 August 2020	115	51	27	37	179	171	+8	44.35
Parma	(Italy)	28 August 2020	7 January 2021	18	4	6	8	18	33	−15	22.22
Cagliari	(Italy)	1 July 2022	20 December 2022	20	6	7	7	24	26	−2	30.00
Salernitana	(Italy)	11 February 2024	18 March 2024	5	0	1	4	3	12	−9	0.00
Total				205	78	51	76	285	305	−20	38.05

== Honours ==
Lazio

- Coppa Italia: 2003–04
