= Per Krøldrup =

Danish footballer (born 1979)

Personal information
- Full name: Per Billeskov Krøldrup
- Date of birth: 31 July 1979 (age 47)
- Place of birth: Farsø, Denmark
- Height: 1.94 m (6 ft 4 in)
- Position: Centre back

Youth career
- 1985–1994: Farsø/Ullits IK
- 1994–1998: Aalborg Chang

Senior career*
Years	Team	Apps	(Gls)
1998–2001	B.93	57	(8)
2001–2005	Udinese	91	(3)
2005–2006	Everton	1	(0)
2006–2012	Fiorentina	117	(3)
2013	Pescara	5	(0)
2013–2014	Olhanense	17	(4)
Total		288	(18)

International career
2004–2010	Denmark	33	(0)
- * Club domestic league appearances and goals

Per Billeskov Krøldrup (Danish pronunciation: [pʰeɐ̯ ˈkʁœlˀdʁɔp]; born 31 July 1979) is a Danish former professional footballer who played as a defender.

He has played 33 games for the Denmark national team, and was part of their squad for the 2004 European Championship.

== Club career ==
=== Early career ===
Born in Farsø, Krøldrup started his footballing career at Danish lower league clubs Farsø/Ullits IK and Aalborg Chang. He then went on to play for Copenhagen-based B.93 in the second-tier Danish 1st Division before transferring to Udinese in the Italian top-flight Serie A championship in 2001. In his final season at the club, they finished fourth and qualified for the UEFA Champions League.

=== Everton ===
In June 2005, Krøldrup moved from Udinese to English club Everton on a four-year deal for a transfer fee of £5million. Before having played a single game for the club, he suffered a groin injury and had to undergo surgery. He made his debut for Everton on 26 December 2005 in a 4-0 defeat to Aston Villa, which was to be his only league game for the club.

His Everton career was later described as one of the worst transfers in the history of the club and English football, and Krøldrup has stated his difficulties of adapting to the physical aspects of the English game.

=== Fiorentina ===
Krøldrup transferred back to Italy on 19 January 2006, when he joined ACF Fiorentina, 31 days after his Everton debut.

Following the 2006 Serie A scandal, where several clubs were on trial for match fixing, Fiorentina were initially relegated to Serie B in July 2006. Krøldrup was amongst the players wanting to leave. However, as Fiorentina made an appeal to the Italian Football Federation, the club remained in Serie A and most of their players, including Krøldrup, remained with the Florence club. He made his Champions League debut on 12 August 2008 against Slavia Prague, a 2–0 win for La Viola.

Krøldrup's contract with Fiorentina was set to expire in June 2010, but on 17 May 2010 he signed a new deal that expired in 2012.

=== Pescara and Olhanense ===
On 8 March 2013, Krøldrup signed a short-term contract with Serie A club Delfino Pescara 1936 for the rest of the 2012–13 season.

After a Summer as a free agent, he signed for Olhanense of the Portuguese Primeira Liga on 1 October 2013.

== International career ==
At Udinese, Krøldrup played alongside Danish national team player Martin Jørgensen, who claimed that Krøldrup was ready for the Danish national team in March 2002. Krøldrup was not called up for the national team until February 2004, making his debut against Turkey. He was a part of the Danish squad for the 2004 European Championship, though he did not play any games at the tournament.

== Career statistics ==
=== International ===
Appearances and goals by national team and year
National team	Year	Apps	Goals
Denmark	2004	9	0
Denmark	2005	4	0
Denmark	2006	2	0
Denmark	2007	3	0
Denmark	2008	5	0
Denmark	2009	4	0
Denmark	2010	6	0
Total		33	0
