= Jefferson (footballer, born January 1988) =

Brazilian footballer

Personal information
- Full name: Jefferson Andrade Siqueira
- Date of birth: 6 January 1988 (age 38)
- Place of birth: Guarulhos, Brazil
- Height: 1.89 m (6 ft 2 in)
- Position: Striker

Team information
- Current team: Fidelis Andria
- Number: 79

Youth career
- 2004–2005: Paraná

Senior career*
Years	Team	Apps	(Gls)
2007–2008	Paraná	10	(2)
2008–2012	Fiorentina	0	(0)
2009–2010	→ Frosinone (loan)	4	(0)
2010	→ Cassino (loan)	12	(6)
2010–2011	→ Eupen (loan)	17	(3)
2011–2012	→ Latina (loan)	19	(9)
2012–2014	Latina	57	(13)
2014–2015	Livorno	15	(2)
2015–2016	Latina	13	(1)
2016	→ Casertana (loan)	12	(3)
2016–2017	Teramo	8	(3)
2017–2018	Viterbese	36	(14)
2018–2019	Monza	13	(1)
2019	→ Giana Erminio (loan)	13	(2)
2019–2020	Monopoli	20	(5)
2020–2021	Padova	8	(0)
2021	→ Catanzaro (loan)	7	(0)
2021–2022	Latina	30	(7)
2022–2023	Catania	21	(8)
2023–	Fidelis Andria	4	(0)
- * Club domestic league appearances and goals as of 1 October 2023

Jefferson Andrade Siqueira or simply Jefferson (born 6 January 1988) is a Brazilian footballer who plays as a striker for Italian Serie D club Fidelis Andria.

== Career ==
Jefferson started his career at A.D. Guarulhos – SP playing for the Juniores – U 20 team. He was considered a top talent and impressed many scouts with his exceptional football brain and skills. After scoring 8 goals in 15 games at a major tournament Jefferson moved to Paraná Clube – PR in 2004. From 2004–2008 Jefferson played 48 games and scored 27 goals for Paraná, catching the attention of numerous European teams. Fiorentina signed the player for the 2008/ 2009 season. In August 2009 Jefferson was loaned to Frosinone in order to play a season of first team football. Fiorentina wanted the player to get a full season of football so that for the 2010/ 2011 season Jefferson could start playing for the Fiorentina first team. Frosinone caused a lot of off field problems, which meant the player moved to Cassino in January 2010 for the remainder of the 2009/2010 season as the team is only 30 minutes away from Frosinone. Jefferson played 13 games and scored 7 goals for Cassino.

On 10 January 2019, he joined Giana Erminio on loan.

On 2 September 2019, he signed with Monopoli.

On 10 August 2020 he moved to Padova on a 1-year deal. On 29 January 2021 he was loaned to Catanzaro.

Jefferson is a technical player often used as a target man with a goal scoring instinct.
