= Matthias Lepiller =

French footballer (born 1988)

Personal information
- Date of birth: 12 June 1988 (age 38)
- Place of birth: Le Havre, France
- Height: 1.82 m (6 ft 0 in)
- Position: Forward

Youth career
- 2003–2004: Le Havre

Senior career*
Years	Team	Apps	(Gls)
2004–2006	Le Havre	2	(0)
2006–2012	Fiorentina	0	(0)
2008–2009	→ Grasshopper (loan)	4	(0)
2009–2011	→ Eupen (loan)	37	(13)
2011–2012	→ Verona (loan)	13	(4)
2012–2014	Novara	45	(7)
2014–2015	Juve Stabia	11	(1)
- * Club domestic league appearances and goals

Matthias Lepiller (born 12 June 1988) is a French footballer who plays at forward position.

== Career ==
=== Le Havre ===
He made two appearances for Le Havre AC before joining ACF Fiorentina at age of 18 on free transfer in 2006. He made his Ligue 2 debut against AS Nancy, 3 December 2004.

=== Fiorentina ===
In July 2008 he rejected a transfer to Queens Park Rangers on loan. In August was loaned out to Grasshopper-Club Zürich, he turned back on 12 January 2009 to ACF Fiorentina. The French player was then loaned out to K.A.S. Eupen from 2009 to 2011 and subsequently to Verona.

On 16 September 2009, it was announced that Fiorentina was ordered by FIFA to pay Le Havre €600,000 for signing Lepiller in 2006. La viola appealed, but the Court of Arbitration for Sport upheld the decision.

=== Novara ===
On 30 August 2012, Lepiller joined Serie B side Novara Calcio.

=== Juve Stabia ===
In summer 2014 he was signed by Juve Stabia. In 2015, after the closure of January transfer window, Lepiller was released.
