= 2003 UEFA European Under-19 Championship squads =

Player listings in youth football competition

Players born on or after 1 January 1984 were eligible to participate in the tournament. Players' age as of 16 July 2003 – the tournament's opening day. Players in bold have later been capped at full international level.

== Group A ==
=== Italy ===
Head coach: (Italy) Paolo Berrettini

No.	Pos.	Player	Date of birth (age)	Caps	Goals	Club
1	GK	Marco Paoloni	21 February 1984 (aged 19)	4	0	(Italy) Roma
2	DF	Damiano Ferronetti	1 November 1984 (aged 18)	7	0	(Italy) Roma
3	DF	Andrea Mantovani	22 June 1984 (aged 19)	9	0	(Italy) Torino
4	MF	Gabriele Perico	11 March 1984 (aged 19)	8	2	(Italy) Atalanta
5	DF	Mauro Belotti	13 May 1984 (aged 19)	9	1	(Italy) Atalanta
6	DF	**Giorgio Chiellini**	14 August 1984 (aged 18)	13	1	(Italy) Livorno
7	MF	Adriano D'Astolfo	23 March 1984 (aged 19)	10	0	(Italy) Lodigiani
8	MF	**Alberto Aquilani**	7 July 1984 (aged 19)	10	0	(Italy) Roma
9	FW	Luigi Della Rocca	2 September 1984 (aged 18)	7	1	(Italy) Bologna
10	MF	Francesco Lodi	23 March 1984 (aged 19)	9	9	(Italy) Empoli
11	FW	**Gianpaolo Pazzini**	2 August 1984 (aged 18)	6	4	(Italy) Atalanta
12	GK	Andrea Ivaldi	24 February 1984 (aged 19)	6	0	(Italy) Genoa
13	DF	Giuseppe Scurto	5 January 1984 (aged 19)	3	0	(Italy) Roma
14	DF	Alessandro Potenza	8 March 1984 (aged 19)	5	0	(Italy) Internazionale
15	MF	Mirko Stefani	25 January 1984 (aged 19)	3	0	(Italy) Milan
16	MF	Simon Laner	28 January 1984 (aged 19)	4	0	(Italy) Hellas Verona
17	MF	Simone Padoin	18 March 1984 (aged 19)	5	0	(Italy) Atalanta
18	FW	**Raffaele Palladino**	17 April 1984 (aged 19)	2	2	(Italy) Juventus

=== Liechtenstein ===
Head Coach : (Germany) Ralf Loose

No.	Pos.	Player	Date of birth (age)	Caps	Goals	Club
1	GK	Daniel Steuble	21 March 1984 (aged 19)			(Liechtenstein) Eschen/Mauren
2	DF	Christoph Bühler	31 January 1987 (aged 16)			(Liechtenstein) Triesenberg
3	DF	**Sandro Maierhofer**	31 May 1985 (aged 18)			(Liechtenstein) Balzers
4	MF	Reto Mündle	3 July 1984 (aged 19)			(Liechtenstein) Vaduz
5	DF	**Franz-Josef Vogt**	30 October 1985 (aged 17)			(Liechtenstein) Balzers
6	DF	Matthias Biedermann	13 August 1985 (aged 17)			(Liechtenstein) Vaduz
7	MF	**Claudio Alabor**	20 January 1985 (aged 18)			(Liechtenstein) Ruggell
8	FW	Pascal Söldi	23 February 1984 (aged 19)			(Liechtenstein) Balzers
9	MF	**Martin Büchel**	19 February 1987 (aged 16)			(Liechtenstein) Ruggell
10	MF	Christoph Frick	24 January 1984 (aged 19)			(Liechtenstein) Vaduz
11	FW	Mirco Stoffel				
12	GK	Florian Meier	19 March 1986 (aged 17)			(Liechtenstein) Ruggell
13	MF	Michael Noser				
14	DF	Marc Messenger				
15	MF	**Stefan Büchel**	30 June 1986 (aged 17)			(Liechtenstein) Ruggell
16	MF	Sandro Hasler	7 December 1985 (aged 17)			(Liechtenstein) Ruggell
17	DF	**Marco Ritzberger**	27 December 1986 (aged 16)			(Liechtenstein) Vaduz
18	FW	**Raphael Rohrer**	3 May 1985 (aged 18)			(Liechtenstein) Schaan

=== Norway ===
Head coach: (Norway) Egil Olsen

No.	Pos.	Player	Date of birth (age)	Caps	Goals	Club
1	GK	**Rune Jarstein**	29 September 1984 (aged 18)			(Norway) Odd
2	DF	Martin Overvik	1 April 1984 (aged 19)			(Norway) Alta
3	DF	Kristian Flittie Onstad	9 May 1984 (aged 19)			(Norway) Lyn
4	DF	Vegard Lie	22 February 1984 (aged 19)			(Norway) Odd
5	DF	Gisle Refseth	21 March 1984 (aged 19)			(Norway) Rosenborg
6	DF	Eirik Bertheussen	2 April 1984 (aged 19)			(Norway) Tromsø
7	MF	Kjell André Thu	8 July 1984 (aged 19)			(Norway) Ørn-Horten
8	FW	Olav Tuelo Johannesen	23 February 1984 (aged 19)			(Norway) Sandefjord
9	FW	Branimir Poljac	17 May 1984 (aged 19)			(Norway) Stabæk
10	MF	**Petter Vaagan Moen**	5 February 1984 (aged 19)			(Norway) Hamarkameratene
11	MF	Jone Samuelsen	6 July 1984 (aged 19)			(Norway) Haugesund
12	GK	Magnus Hjulstad	15 March 1984 (aged 19)			(Norway) Vålerenga
13	DF	**Trond Erik Bertelsen**	5 June 1984 (aged 19)			(Norway) Haugesund
14	DF	Tommy Edvardsen	26 December 1984 (aged 18)			(Norway) Vålerenga
15	MF	Michael Røn	25 July 1984 (aged 18)			(Norway) Fredrikstad
16	FW	**Daniel Fredheim Holm**	30 July 1985 (aged 17)			(Norway) Skeid
17	MF	**Trond Olsen**	5 February 1984 (aged 19)			(Norway) Bodø/Glimt
18	MF	**Henning Hauger**	17 July 1985 (aged 17)			(Norway) Stabæk

=== Portugal ===
Head coach: (Portugal) Carlos Alberto Lopes Dinis

No.	Pos.	Player	Date of birth (age)	Caps	Goals	Club
1	GK	Paulo Ribeiro	6 June 1984 (aged 19)			(Portugal) Vitória de Setúbal
2	DF	Eurípedes Amoreirinha	5 August 1984 (aged 18)			(Portugal) Alverca
3	MF	Amaro Filipe	25 October 1984 (aged 18)			(Portugal) Benfica
4	DF	Miguel Ângelo	10 October 1984 (aged 18)			(Portugal) Sporting CP
5	MF	Rodrigo Ângelo	15 October 1984 (aged 18)			(Portugal) Porto B
6	MF	Sérgio Organista	26 August 1984 (aged 18)			(Portugal) Porto
7	DF	**João Pereira**	25 February 1984 (aged 19)			(Portugal) Benfica
8	MF	Daniel	6 May 1984 (aged 19)			(Portugal) Chaves
9	FW	**Hugo Almeida**	23 May 1984 (aged 19)			(Portugal) Porto
10	FW	Helio Pinto	29 February 1984 (aged 19)			(Portugal) Benfica
11	FW	Paulo Sérgio	24 January 1984 (aged 19)			(Portugal) Sporting CP
12	GK	Tecelão	30 March 1984 (aged 19)			(Portugal) Sporting CP
13	MF	João Pedro	17 September 1984 (aged 18)			(Portugal) Boavista
14	MF	Filipe Oliveira	27 May 1984 (aged 19)			(England) Chelsea
15	MF	Cadinha	1 September 1984 (aged 18)			(Portugal) Leixões
16	MF	Pedro Pereira	3 January 1984 (aged 19)			(Portugal) Braga
17	GK	Carlos Fonseca	5 January 1985 (aged 18)			(Portugal) Leixões
18	MF	Flávio Igor	10 February 1984 (aged 19)			(Portugal) Porto B

== Group B ==
=== Austria ===
Head Coach : (Austria) Paul Gludovatz

No.	Pos.	Player	Date of birth (age)	Caps	Club
1	GK	**Robert Almer**	20 March 1984 (aged 19)		Austria Wien
2	DF	Thomas Lechner	22 October 1985 (aged 17)		(Austria) Grazer AK
3	DF	Martin Lassnig	9 January 1984 (aged 19)		(Austria) LASK
4	DF	Jürgen Rauchbauer	15 May 1984 (aged 19)		Austria Wien
5	DF	Markus Berger	21 January 1985 (aged 18)		(Austria) SV Ried
6	MF	**Thomas Prager**	13 September 1985 (aged 17)		(Netherlands) Heerenveen
7	MF	**Klaus Salmutter**	3 January 1984 (aged 19)		(Austria) Sturm Graz
8	MF	Pascal Velek	9 March 1984 (aged 19)		Austria Wien
9	FW	Lukas Mössner	14 March 1984 (aged 19)		(Germany) SC Freiburg
10	MF	Salmin Čehajić	7 May 1984 (aged 19)		(Austria) Rapid Wien
11	MF	**Jürgen Säumel**	8 September 1984 (aged 18)		(Austria) Sturm Graz
12	GK	Thomas Vollnhofer	2 September 1984 (aged 18)		(Austria) SKN St. Pölten
13	DF	Mario Fürthaler	26 October 1984 (aged 18)		(Austria) SC Untersiebenbrunn
14	DF	Mario Bolter	1 July 1984 (aged 19)		(Austria) SC Bregenz
15	MF	Sandro Lindschinger	18 October 1985 (aged 17)		(Austria) Sturm Graz
16	MF	René Schicker	28 September 1984 (aged 18)		Austria Salzburg
17	MF	Ernst Öbster	17 March 1984 (aged 19)		Austria Salzburg
18	FW	**Roman Kienast**	29 March 1984 (aged 19)		(Austria) Rapid Wien

=== Czech Republic ===
Head Coach : (Czech Republic) Michal Bílek

No.	Pos.	Player	Date of birth (age)	Caps	Club
1	GK	Tomáš Černý	10 April 1985 (aged 18)		(Czech Republic) Sigma Olomouc
2	DF	**Václav Procházka**	8 May 1984 (aged 19)		(Czech Republic) Viktoria Plzeň
3	DF	Lukáš Nachtman	11 May 1984 (aged 19)		(Czech Republic) Slavia Prague
4	MF	**Roman Hubník**	6 June 1984 (aged 19)		(Czech Republic) Sigma Olomouc
5	DF	**Michal Kadlec**	13 December 1984 (aged 18)		(Czech Republic) Slovácko
6	DF	Martin Pulkert	24 February 1984 (aged 19)		(Czech Republic) 1. HFK Olomouc
7	MF	Ladislav Volešák	7 April 1984 (aged 19)		(Czech Republic) Sparta Prague
8	FW	Pavel Siranec	24 May 1984 (aged 19)		(Czech Republic) Sigma Olomouc
9	FW	Adam Varadi	30 April 1985 (aged 18)		(Czech Republic) Baník Ostrava
10	DF	**Martin Klein**	2 July 1984 (aged 19)		(Czech Republic) Sparta Prague
11	DF	Michal Blažej	27 March 1984 (aged 19)		(Czech Republic) Hradec Králové
12	DF	Milan Matula	22 April 1984 (aged 19)		(Czech Republic) Slovan Liberec
13	MF	Josef Brodský	19 May 1985 (aged 18)		(Czech Republic) Marila Příbram
14	FW	Petr Mikolanda	12 September 1984 (aged 18)		(Czech Republic) Viktoria Žižkov
15	FW	Petr Kobylík	8 May 1985 (aged 18)		(Czech Republic) Sigma Olomouc
16	GK	Petr Bolek	13 June 1984 (aged 19)		(Czech Republic) Baník Ostrava
17	MF	Pavel Malcharek	16 February 1986 (aged 17)		(Czech Republic) Vítkovice
18	DF	Aleš Neuwirth	4 January 1985 (aged 18)		(Czech Republic) Baník Ostrava

=== England ===
Head coach: (England) Stuart Baxter

No.	Pos.	Player	Date of birth (age)	Caps	Club
1	GK	Luke Steele	24 September 1984 (aged 18)		(England) Manchester United
2	DF	**Justin Hoyte**	20 November 1984 (aged 18)		(England) Arsenal
3	MF	Peter Whittingham	8 September 1984 (aged 18)		(England) Aston Villa
4	MF	John Welsh	10 January 1984 (aged 19)		(England) Liverpool
5	DF	Liam Ridgewell	21 July 1984 (aged 18)		(England) Aston Villa
6	DF	Andrew Davies	17 December 1984 (aged 18)		(England) Middlesbrough
7	MF	Wayne Routledge	7 January 1985 (aged 18)		(England) Crystal Palace
8	MF	Ciaran Donnelly	2 April 1984 (aged 19)		(England) Blackburn Rovers
9	FW	Thomas Wright	28 September 1984 (aged 18)		(England) Leicester City
10	MF	Lee Croft	26 June 1985 (aged 18)		(England) Manchester City
11	MF	**Stewart Downing**	22 July 1984 (aged 18)		(England) Middlesbrough
12	DF	Steven Schumacher	30 April 1984 (aged 19)		(England) Everton
13	GK	**Lee Camp**	22 August 1984 (aged 18)		(England) Derby County
14	DF	Alan Moogan	22 April 1984 (aged 19)		(England) Everton
15	DF	Dean Leacock	10 June 1984 (aged 19)		(England) Fulham
16	DF	Marcel McKie	22 September 1984 (aged 18)		(England) Tottenham Hotspur
17	FW	Jerome Watt	20 October 1984 (aged 18)		(England) Blackburn Rovers
18	FW	Dorryl Proffitt	2 May 1985 (aged 18)		(England) Manchester City

=== France ===
Head Coach : (France) René Girard

No.	Pos.	Player	Date of birth (age)	Caps	Club
1	GK	Florent Chaigneau	21 March 1984 (aged 19)		(France) Rennes
2	DF	**Abdelaziz Kamara**	10 April 1984 (aged 19)		(France) Saint-Étienne
3	DF	Jérémy Berthod	24 April 1984 (aged 19)		(France) Lyon
4	DF	Julio Colombo	2 February 1984 (aged 19)		(France) Montpellier
5	DF	**Jacques Faty**	25 February 1984 (aged 19)		(France) Rennes
6	DF	Stéphen Drouin	27 January 1984 (aged 19)		(France) Rennes
7	MF	Luigi Glombard	21 August 1984 (aged 18)		(France) Nantes
8	MF	**Hassan Yebda**	14 May 1984 (aged 19)		(France) Auxerre
9	FW	Sébastien Grax	23 June 1984 (aged 19)		(France) Monaco
10	MF	**Mourad Meghni**	16 April 1984 (aged 19)		(Italy) Bologna
11	MF	Yann Jouffre	23 July 1984 (aged 18)		(France) Nîmes
12	MF	**Emerse Faé**	24 January 1984 (aged 19)		(France) Nantes
13	FW	**Sylvain Idangar**	4 March 1984 (aged 19)		(France) Lyon
14	DF	Albin Ebondo	23 February 1984 (aged 19)		(France) Toulouse
15	MF	Kévin Jacmot	22 March 1984 (aged 19)		(France) Lyon
16	GK	Michaël Fabre	15 July 1984 (aged 19)		(Italy) Bologna
17	DF	Grégory Bourillon	1 July 1984 (aged 19)		(France) Rennes
18	MF	Serisay Barthelemy	6 January 1984 (aged 19)		(France) Saint-Étienne
