= 2003 UEFA European Under-19 Championship =

2003 UEFA Under-19 Championship
U-19-Fußball-Europameisterschaft 2003

Tournament details
- Host country: Liechtenstein
- Dates: 16–26 July
- Teams: 8 (from 1 confederation)
- Venues: 5 (in 5 host cities)

Final positions
- Champions: Italy (3rd title)
- Runners-up: Portugal

Tournament statistics
- Matches played: 15
- Goals scored: 54 (3.6 per match)
- Top scorer(s): (Portugal) Paulo Sérgio (5 goals)
- Best player: (Italy) Alberto Aquilani

The 2003 UEFA European Under-19 Championship was held in Liechtenstein from 16 to 26 July 2003. Players born after 1 January 1984 could participate in this competition.

== Venues ==
Vaduz	Balzers	Eschen
Rheinpark Stadion	Sportplatz Rheinau	Sportpark Eschen-Mauren
Capacity: 3,654	Capacity: 2,500	Capacity: 2,100
2003 UEFA European Under-19 Championship is located in Liechtenstein
Triesen	Schaan	
Sportanlage Blumenau	Sportanlage Rheinwiese	
Capacity: 1,500	Capacity: 1,500	

== Qualifications ==
There were two separate rounds of qualifications held before the Final Tournament.

1. 2003 UEFA European Under-19 Championship first qualifying round
2. 2003 UEFA European Under-19 Championship second qualifying round

== Teams ==
The eight teams that participated in the final tournament were:

- Austria
- Czech Republic
- England
- France
- Italy
- Liechtenstein (host)
- Norway
- Portugal

== Match officials ==
Six referees were selected for the tournament:

- (Germany) Michael Weiner
- (Greece) Athanassios Briakos
- (Netherlands) Ruud Bossen
- (Russia) Nikolai Ivanov
- (Spain) Carlos Megía Dávila
- (Turkey) Selçuk Dereli

== Group stage ==
=== Group A ===
Teams	Pld	W	D	L	GF	GA	GD	Pts
Italy	3	2	1	0	7	2	+5	7
Portugal	3	1	2	0	8	3	+5	5
Norway	3	1	1	1	4	4	0	4
Liechtenstein	3	0	0	3	2	12	−10	0

16 July 2003
17:00 CET

Liechtenstein	0–5	Portugal
	Report	João Pereira 17'; Hugo Almeida 63'; Alabor 73' (o.g.); Fonseca 82'; Paulo Sérgio 84'

Rheinpark Stadion, Vaduz
Referee: Nikolai Ivanov (Russia)
16 July 2003
18:30 CET

Norway	0–1	Italy
	Report	Aquilani 89' (pen.)

Sportplatz Rheinau, Balzers
Referee: Athanassios Briakos (Greece)

18 July 2003
15:30 CET

Portugal	1–1	Italy
Daniel 49'	Report	Lodi 58'

Sportpark Eschen-Mauren, Eschen
Referee: Michael Weiner (Germany)
18 July 2003
18:30 CET

Liechtenstein	1–2	Norway
Maierhofer 4'	Report	Poljac 28'; Bühler 37' (o.g.)

Blumenau Stadium, Triesen
Referee: Selçuk Dereli (Turkey)

20 July 2003
18:30 CET

Portugal	2–2	Norway
Paulo Sérgio 61', 80'	Report	Johannesen 3'; Daniel Holm 21'

Sportsplatz Rheinwiese, Schaan
Referee: Ruud Bossen (Netherlands)
20 July 2003
18:30 CET

Italy	5–1	Liechtenstein
Della Rocca 11'; Palladino 39'; Laner 53', 67'; Lodi 55' (pen.)	Report	Büchel 68'

Sportplatz Rheinau, Balzers
Referee: Carlos Megía Dávila (Spain)

=== Group B ===
Teams	Pld	W	D	L	GF	GA	GD	Pts
Austria	3	2	1	0	7	3	+4	7
Czech Republic	3	1	1	1	7	7	0	4
England	3	1	0	2	3	5	−2	3
France	3	0	2	1	4	6	−2	2

16 July 2003
18:30 CET

England	1–2	Austria
Downing 36'	Report	Mössner 5'; Säumel 60'

Sportsplatz Rheinwiese, Schaan
Referee: Selçuk Dereli (Turkey)
16 July 2003
20:10 CET

France	3–3	Czech Republic
Grax 6', 63' (pen.); Idangar 70'	Report	Mikolanda 26'; Procházka 87'; Matula 90+3'

Rheinpark Stadion, Vaduz
Referee: Carlos Megía Dávila (Spain)

18 July 2003
18:30 CET

France	0–2	England
	Report	Ridgewell 41'; Routledge 90+2'

Sportpark Eschen-Mauren, Eschen
Referee: Ruud Bossen (Netherlands)
18 July 2003
18:30 CET

Czech Republic	1–4	Austria
Mikolanda 10'	Report	Schicker 36', 45'; Kienast 38', 54'

Sportsplatz Rheinwiese, Schaan
Referee: Athanassios Briakos (Greece)

20 July 2003
18:30 CET

Czech Republic	3–0	England
Nachtman 47'; Brodský 54'; Siranec 63'	Report

Sportpark Eschen-Mauren, Eschen
Referee: Michael Weiner (Germany)
20 July 2003
18:30 CET

Austria	1–1	France
Čehajić 82' (pen.)	Report	Grax 90+2' (pen.)

Blumenau Stadium, Triesen
Referee: Nikolai Ivanov (Russia)

== Semi-finals ==
23 July 2003
16:30 CET

Austria	3–6 (a.e.t.)	Portugal
Salmutter 24', 28'; Mössner 84'	Report	Hugo Almeida 31' (pen.); Organista 38'; Paulo Sérgio 54', 103' (pen.); Pedro Pereira 100', 104'

Rheinpark Stadion, Vaduz
Referee: Michael Weiner (Germany)

23 July 2003
20:00 CET

Italy	1–0	Czech Republic
Pazzini 57'	Report

Rheinpark Stadion, Vaduz
Referee: Carlos Megía Dávila (Spain)

== Final ==
26 July 2003
20:00 CET

Italy	2–0	Portugal
Della Rocca 3'; Pazzini 27'	Report

Rheinpark Stadion, Vaduz
Attendance: 4500
Referee: Selçuk Dereli (Turkey)

2003 UEFA U-19 European champions

Italy
Third title

== Goalscorers ==
5 goals

- (Portugal) Paulo Sérgio

3 goals

- (France) Sébastien Grax

2 goals

- (Austria) Roman Kienast
- (Austria) Lukas Mössner
- (Austria) Klaus Salmutter
- (Austria) René Schicker
- (Czech Republic) Petr Mikolanda
- (Italy) Simon Laner
- (Italy) Francesco Lodi
- (Italy) Giampaolo Pazzini
- (Italy) Della Rocca
- (Portugal) Hugo Almeida
- (Portugal) Pedro Pereira

1 goal

- (Austria) Salmin Čehajić
- (Austria) Jürgen Säumel
- (Czech Republic) Josef Brodský
- (Czech Republic) Milan Matula
- (Czech Republic) Lukáš Nachtman
- (Czech Republic) Václav Procházka
- (Czech Republic) Pavel Siranec
- (England) Stewart Downing
- (England) Liam Ridgewell
- (England) Wayne Routledge
- (France) Sylvain Idangar
- (Italy) Alberto Aquilani
- (Italy) Raffaele Palladino
- (Liechtenstein) Martin Büchel
- (Liechtenstein) Sandro Maierhofer
- (Norway) Daniel Fredheim Holm
- (Norway) Olav Tuelo Johannesen
- (Norway) Branimir Poljac
- (Portugal) Daniel
- (Portugal) Fonseca
- (Portugal) Organista
- (Portugal) João Pereira

Own goals

- (Liechtenstein) Claudio Alabor (playing against Portugal)
- (Liechtenstein) Christoph Bühler (playing against Norway)

== See also ==
- 2003 UEFA European Under-19 Championship first qualifying round
- 2003 UEFA European Under-19 Championship second qualifying round
