= 2012–13 ACF Fiorentina season =

Fiorentina
2012–13 season
- President: Mario Cognigni
- Manager: Vincenzo Montella
- Stadium: Stadio Artemio Franchi
- Serie A: 4th
- Coppa Italia: Quarter-finals
- Top goalscorer: League: Stevan Jovetić (13); All: Stevan Jovetić (13)
- Highest home attendance: 38,440 vs Juventus (25 September 2012, Serie A)
- Lowest home attendance: 7,311 vs Juve Stabia (28 November 2012, Coppa Italia)
- Average home league attendance: 25,665
Home colours	Away colours	Third colours

The 2012–13 season was the 86th season in ACF Fiorentina's history, their 75th season in Serie A, and the eighth consecutive season since promotion from Serie B in 2004. The club competed in Serie A, finishing fourth for the first time since the 2008–09 season, and in the 2012–13 edition in Coppa Italia, where they were eliminated in the quarter-finals.

In addition to the success of achieving fourth place, the season was also notable for the return of striker Luca Toni to the club, with whom he scored 31 goals in the 2005–06 season, winning the European Golden Shoe.

== Players ==
=== Squad information ===
Last updated on 19 May 2013
Appearances include league matches only

No.	Name	Nat	Position(s)	Date of birth (Age at end of season)	Signed from	Signed in	Apps.	Goals
Goalkeepers
1	Emiliano Viviano	(Italy)	GK	December 1, 1985 (aged 27)	(Italy) Palermo	2012	32	0
12	Cristiano Lupatelli	(Italy)	GK	June 21, 1978 (aged 35)	(Italy) Genoa	2012	1	0
24	Luca Lezzerini	(Italy)	GK	March 24, 1995 (aged 18)	(Italy) Youth Sector	2011	0	0
89	Neto	(Brazil)	GK	July 19, 1989 (aged 23)	(Brazil) Atlético Paranaense	2011	8	0
Defenders
2	Gonzalo Rodríguez	(Argentina)	CB	April 10, 1984 (aged 29)	(Spain) Villarreal	2012	35	6
3	Ahmed Hegazi	(Egypt)	CB	January 25, 1991 (aged 22)	(Egypt) Ismaily	2012	2	0
4	Facundo Roncaglia	(Argentina)	CB / RB	February 10, 1987 (aged 26)	(Argentina) Boca Juniors	2012	24	3
5	Marvin Compper	(Germany)	CB / LB	June 14, 1985 (aged 28)	(Germany) 1899 Hoffenheim	2013	7	0
15	Stefan Savić	(Montenegro)	CB / RB	January 8, 1991 (aged 22)	(England) Manchester City	2012	26	2
23	Manuel Pasqual (Captain)	(Italy)	LB / LM	March 13, 1982 (aged 31)	(Italy) Arezzo	2005	239	5
31	Michele Camporese	(Italy)	CB	May 19, 1992 (aged 21)	(Italy) Youth Sector	2011	16	1
40	Nenad Tomović	(Serbia)	CB / LB / RB	August 30, 1987 (aged 25)	(Italy) Genoa	2012	26	0
Midfielders
6	Mohamed Sissoko	(Mali)	CM / DM	January 22, 1985 (aged 28)	(France) Paris Saint-Germain	2013	5	0
7	David Pizarro	(Chile)	CM / DM	September 11, 1979 (aged 33)	(Italy) Roma	2012	29	3
10	Alberto Aquilani	(Italy)	CM / DM / AM	July 7, 1984 (aged 28)	(England) Liverpool	2012	25	7
11	Juan Cuadrado	(Colombia)	RW / AM	May 26, 1988 (aged 25)	(Italy) Udinese	2012	36	5
14	Matías Fernández	(Chile)	AM / CM	May 15, 1986 (aged 27)	(Portugal) Sporting CP	2012	22	1
19	Cristian Llama	(Argentina)	CM	June 26, 1986 (aged 27)	(Italy) Catania	2012	5	0
20	Borja Valero	(Spain)	CM / DM / AM	January 12, 1985 (aged 28)	(Spain) Villarreal	2012	37	1
21	Giulio Migliaccio	(Italy)	DM / CM	June 23, 1981 (aged 32)	(Italy) Palermo	2012	24	1
27	Rafał Wolski	(Poland)	AM / LW / RW	November 10, 1992 (aged 20)	(Poland) Legia Warsaw	2013	1	0
92	Rômulo	(Brazil)	RB / CM	May 22, 1987 (aged 26)	(Brazil) Atlético Paranaense	2011	30	2
Forwards
8	Stevan Jovetić	(Montenegro)	CF / ST	November 2, 1989 (aged 23)	(Serbia) Partizan	2008	116	35
9	Mounir El Hamdaoui	(Morocco)	CF / ST	July 14, 1984 (aged 28)	(Netherlands) Ajax	2012	19	3
18	Marcelo Larrondo	(Argentina)	CF / ST	August 16, 1988 (aged 24)	(Italy) Siena	2013	7	2
22	Adem Ljajić	(Serbia)	LW / RW / SS / AM	29 September 1991 (aged 21)	(Serbia) Partizan	2010	78	15
30	Luca Toni	(Italy)	CF / ST	May 26, 1977 (aged 36)	(United Arab Emirates) Al-Nasr	2012	27	8
49	Giuseppe Rossi	(Italy)	ST / SS	February 1, 1987 (aged 26)	(Spain) Villarreal	2013	1	0
Players transferred during the season
5	Rubén Olivera	(Uruguay)	AM / CM / RW / LW	May 4, 1983 (aged 30)	(Italy) Lecce	2012	13	0
15	Matija Nastasić	(Serbia)	CB	March 28, 1993 (aged 20)	(Serbia) Teleoptik	2011	26	2
16	Mattia Cassani	(Italy)	RB	August 26, 1983 (aged 29)	(Italy) Palermo	2011	34	1
17	Haris Seferovic	(Switzerland)	CF / ST	February 22, 1992 (aged 21)	(Switzerland) Grasshoppers	2010	8	0
18	Francesco Della Rocca	(Italy)	CM	September 14, 1987 (aged 25)	(Italy) Palermo	2012	0	0

== Transfers ==
=== In ===
No.	Pos.	Nat.	Name	Age	EU	Moving from	Type	Transfer window	Ends	Transfer fee	Source
3	DF	(Egypt)	Ahmed Hegazi	21	Non-EU	Ismaily (Egypt)	Transfer	Summer	2016	€ 1.5M	
16	DF	(Italy)	Mattia Cassani	28	EU	Palermo	Transfer	Summer	2014	Undisclosed	violachannel.TV
4	DF	(Argentina)	Facundo Roncaglia	25	EU	Boca Juniors (Argentina)	End of Contract	Summer	2016	Free	
9	FW	(Morocco)	Mounir El Hamdaoui	27	EU	Ajax (Netherlands)	Transfer	Summer	2015	€ 0.7M	
12	GK	(Italy)	Cristiano Lupatelli	34	EU	Genoa	End of Contract	Summer	2013	Free	
11	MF	(Colombia)	Juan Cuadrado	24	Non-EU	Udinese	Loan	Summer	2015	Undisclosed	
14	MF	(Chile)	Matías Fernández	26	Non-EU	Sporting CP (Portugal)	Transfer	Summer	2016	€ 4M	violachannel.TV
1	GK	(Italy)	Emiliano Viviano	26	EU	Palermo	Loan	Summer	2013	Undisclosed	
18	MF	(Italy)	Francesco Della Rocca	24	EU	Palermo	Loan	Summer	2013	Undisclosed	
20	MF	(Spain)	Borja Valero	27	EU	Villarreal (Spain)	Transfer	Summer	2017	€ 7M	violachannel.TV
2	DF	(Argentina)	Gonzalo Rodríguez	28	EU	Villarreal (Spain)	Transfer	Summer	2015	€ 1.3M	violachannel.TV
10	MF	(Italy)	Alberto Aquilani	28	EU	Liverpool (England)	Transfer	Summer	2015	€ 8.6M	violachannel.TV
7	MF	(Chile)	David Pizarro	32	EU	Roma	Transfer	Summer	2015	Free	
21	MF	(Italy)	Giulio Migliaccio	31	EU	Palermo	Loan	Summer	2013	Undisclosed	
40	DF	(Serbia)	Nenad Tomović	25	Non-EU	Genoa	Co-Ownership	Summer		€ 2.5M	
15	DF	(Montenegro)	Stefan Savić	21	Non-EU	Manchester City (England)	Transfer	Summer	2016	Swap	
19	MF	(Argentina)	Cristian Llama	26	EU	Catania	Loan	Summer	2013	Undisclosed	
30	FW	(Italy)	Luca Toni	35	EU	Al-Nasr (United Arab Emirates)	Transfer	Summer	2013	Free	
49	FW	(Italy)	Giuseppe Rossi	25	EU	Villarreal (Spain)	Transfer	Winter	2017	€ 9.5M	NBCSports.com
5	DF	(Germany)	Marvin Compper	27	EU	Hoffenheim (Germany)	Transfer	Winter	2015	Undisclosed	Goal.com
6	MF	(Mali)	Mohamed Sissoko	28	EU	PSG (France)	Loan	Winter	2013	Loan	Skysports.com
27	MF	(Poland)	Rafał Wolski	19	EU	Legia Warsaw (Poland)	Transfer	Winter		€ 2.2M	Goal.com

=== Out ===
No.	Pos.	Nat.	Name	Age	EU	Moving to	Type	Transfer window	Transfer fee	Source
	GK	(Poland)	Artur Boruc	32	EU	Southampton (England)	End of Contract	Summer	Free	
	DF	(Denmark)	Per Krøldrup	33	EU	Free agent	End of Contract	Summer	Free	
	MF	(Ghana)	Amidu Salifu	19	Non-EU	Catania	Loan	Summer	Undisclosed	
	GK	(Italy)	Edoardo Pazzagli	23	EU	Milan	End of Contract	Summer	Free	
	MF	(Italy)	Riccardo Montolivo	27	EU	Milan	End of Contract	Summer	Free	
	GK	(Brazil)	Marcos Miranda	20	EU	Pro Vercelli	End of Contract	Summer	Free	
	FW	(Italy)	Amauri	32	EU	Parma	End of Contract	Summer	Free	
	FW	(Brazil)	Jefferson	24	EU	Latina	Transfer	Summer	Undisclosed	
	DF	(Italy)	Cristiano Piccini	19	EU	Spezia	Loan	Summer	Undisclosed	
	MF	(Ghana)	Daniel Kofi Agyei	20	Non-EU	Juve Stabia	Loan	Summer	Undisclosed	
	MF	(Morocco)	Houssine Kharja	29	EU	Al-Arabi (Qatar)	Released	Summer	Undisclosed	
	FW	(Senegal)	Khouma Babacar	19	Non-EU	Padova	Loan	Summer	Undisclosed	
	DF	(Italy)	Lorenzo De Silvestri	24	EU	Sampdoria	Loan	Summer	Undisclosed	
	DF	(Italy)	Alessandro Gamberini	30	EU	Napoli	Transfer	Summer	€ 1.5M	
	MF	(Switzerland)	Valon Behrami	27	EU	Napoli	Transfer	Summer	€ 7M	
	DF	(Italy)	Cesare Natali	33	EU	Bologna	End of Contract	Summer	Free	
	DF	(Brazil)	Felipe	28	EU	Siena	Loan	Summer	Undisclosed	
	FW	(Italy)	Alessio Cerci	25	EU	Torino	Co-Ownership	Summer	€ 2.5M	
	MF	(Italy)	Andrea Lazzari	27	EU	Udinese	Loan	Summer	Undisclosed	
	MF	(Peru)	Juan Manuel Vargas	28	Non-EU	Genoa	Loan	Summer	Undisclosed	
	DF	(Serbia)	Matija Nastasić	19	Non-EU	Manchester City (England)	Transfer	Summer	€ 14.8M	

== Pre-season and friendlies ==
27 July 2012 Friendly	Fiorentina	0–0	Hellas Verona	Moena
17:30 CEST (UTC+02:00)				Stadium: Campo Sportivo Cesare Benatti

5 August 2012 Friendly	Fiorentina (Italy)	2–1	(Greece) Aris	Moena
17:30 CEST (UTC+02:00)				Stadium: Campo Sportivo Cesare Benatti

== Competitions ==
=== Overall ===
Competition	Started round	Current position	Final position	First match	Last match
Serie A	Matchday 1	—	4th	25 August 2012	19 May 2013
Coppa Italia	Third round	—	Quarter-finals	18 August 2012	16 January 2013

Last updated: 19 May 2013

=== Serie A ===
==== League table ====
Pos	Team	Pld	W	D	L	GF	GA	GD	Pts	Qualification or relegation
2	Napoli	38	23	9	6	73	36	+37	78	Qualification for the Champions League group stage
3	Milan	38	21	9	8	67	39	+28	72	Qualification for the Champions League play-off round
4	Fiorentina	38	21	7	10	72	44	+28	70	Qualification for the Europa League play-off round
5	Udinese	38	18	12	8	59	45	+14	66	Qualification for the Europa League third qualifying round
6	Roma	38	18	8	12	71	56	+15	62	

Source: Serie A, Soccerway
Rules for classification: 1st points; 2nd head-to-head points; 3rd head-to-head goal difference; 4th goal difference; 5th number of goals scored; 6th public draw.
(Head-to-head record is applied for clubs with the same number of points only once all matches between said clubs have been played)

==== Results summary ====
Overall								Home						Away					
Pld	W	D	L	GF	GA	GD	Pts	W	D	L	GF	GA	GD	W	D	L	GF	GA	GD
38	21	7	10	72	44	+28	70	13	4	2	40	19	+21	8	3	8	32	25	+7

Last updated: 19 May 2013.
Source: Competitive matches

==== Results by round ====
Round	1	2	3	4	5	6	7	8	9	10	11	12	13	14	15	16	17	18	19	20	21	22	23	24	25	26	27	28	29	30	31	32	33	34	35	36	37	38
Ground	H	A	H	A	H	A	H	A	H	A	H	A	H	A	H	A	H	A	H	A	H	A	H	A	H	A	H	A	H	A	H	A	H	A	H	A	H	A
Result	W	L	W	D	D	L	W	D	W	W	W	W	W	D	D	L	W	W	L	L	D	L	W	L	W	L	W	W	W	L	D	W	W	W	L	W	W	W
Position	6	11	6	6	7	6	5	6	5	5	4	4	4	4	4	6	4	4	5	5	5	6	6	6	6	6	6	4	4	4	4	4	4	4	4	4	4	4

Updated to match(es) played on 19 May 2013. Source: Competitive matches
A = Away; H = Home; W = Win; D = Draw; L = Loss

==== Matches ====
25 August 2012 1	Fiorentina	2–1	Udinese	Florence
18:00 CEST (UTC+02:00)	Jovetić 67', 90', (yellow card) 89'; Cuadrado (yellow card) 80'	Report	Maicosuel 28'; Danilo (yellow card) 87'	Stadium: Stadio Artemio Franchi; Attendance: 24,601; Referee: Paolo Mazzoleni

2 September 2012 2	Napoli	2–1	Fiorentina	Naples
20:45 CEST (UTC+02:00)	Cavani (yellow card) 44'; Hamšík 55'; Džemaili 75'; Cannavaro (yellow card) 82'	Report	Roncaglia (yellow card) 37'; Tomović (yellow card) 57'; Jovetić 87'	Stadium: Stadio San Paolo; Attendance: 32,286; Referee: Antonio Damato

16 September 2012 3	Fiorentina	2–0	Catania	Florence
15:00 CEST (UTC+02:00)	Ljajić (yellow card) 19'; Pizarro (yellow card) 39'; Jovetić 42', (yellow card) 68'; Toni 65'	Report	Gómez (yellow card) 39'; Spolli (yellow card) 84'	Stadium: Stadio Artemio Franchi; Attendance: 21,835; Referee: Daniele Doveri

22 September 2012 4	Parma	1–1	Fiorentina	Parma
18:00 CEST (UTC+02:00)	Benalouane (yellow card) 46'; Valdés (yellow card) 57', (goal) 90' (pen.); Galloppa (yellow card) 60'; Rosi (yellow card) 73', (red card) 87'	Report	Roncaglia 20'; Pizarro (yellow card) 31'; Cuadrado (yellow card) 77'; Toni (yellow card) 90'	Stadium: Stadio Ennio Tardini; Attendance: 12,980; Referee: Paolo Valeri

25 September 2012 5	Fiorentina	0–0	Juventus	Florence
20:45 CEST (UTC+02:00)	Pizarro (yellow card) 39'; Gonzalo (yellow card) 45'; Ljajić (yellow card) 49'	Report	Vidal (yellow card) 56'	Stadium: Stadio Artemio Franchi; Attendance: 38,440; Referee: Paolo Tagliavento

30 September 2012 6	Internazionale	2–1	Fiorentina	Milan
20:45 CEST (UTC+02:00)	Milito 17' (pen.); Samuel (yellow card) 28'; Ranocchia (yellow card) 31'; Cassano 34'; Cambiasso (yellow card) 71'; Guarín (yellow card) 90'	Report	Gonzalo (yellow card) 16' (yellow-red card) 62'; Rômulo 40'; Fernández (yellow card) 55'; Roncaglia (yellow card) 64'; Jovetić (yellow card) 88'	Stadium: San Siro; Attendance: 41,082; Referee: Antonio Danilo Giannoccaro

7 October 2012 7	Fiorentina	1–0	Bologna	Florence
15:00 CEST (UTC+02:00)	Jovetić 7'; Roncaglia (yellow card) 28'; Pasqual (yellow card) 36'; Olivera (yellow card) 75'; Migliaccio (yellow card) 81'	Report	Natali (yellow card) 32'; Pazienza (yellow card) 65'; Taïder (yellow card) 90'	Stadium: Stadio Artemio Franchi; Attendance: 20,983; Referee: Daniele Orsato

21 October 2012 8	Chievo	1–1	Fiorentina	Verona
15:00 CEST (UTC+02:00)	Théréau 17'; Dramé (yellow card) 39'; Jokić (yellow card) 73'	Report	Gonzalo 18'; Tomović (yellow card) 47'; Pizarro (yellow card) 76'; Roncaglia (yellow card) 79'	Stadium: Stadio Marc'Antonio Bentegodi; Referee: Marco Guida

28 October 2012 9	Fiorentina	2–0	Lazio	Florence
15:00 CET (UTC+01:00)	Tomović (yellow card) 32'; Ljajić 45'; Gonzalo (yellow card) 52'; Olivera (yellow card) 57'; Toni 90'	Report	Ledesma (yellow card) 12' (yellow-red card) 75'; Konko (yellow card) 25'; Lulić (yellow card) 34'; Dias (yellow card) 39'; Hernanes (red card) 82'	Stadium: Stadio Artemio Franchi; Attendance: 19,395; Referee: Mauro Bergonzi

1 November 2012 10	Genoa	0–1	Fiorentina	Genoa
20:45 CET (UTC+01:00)	Sampirisi (yellow card) 11'; Moretti (yellow card) 13'; Immobile (yellow card) 21'; Granqvist (yellow card) 57'; Kucka (yellow card) 65'; Bertolacci (yellow card) 69'	Report	Pasqual 14', (yellow card) 35'; Pizarro (yellow card) 56'; Cuadrado (yellow card) 70'	Stadium: Stadio Luigi Ferraris; Attendance: 18,952; Referee: Luca Banti

4 November 2012 11	Fiorentina	4–1	Cagliari	Florence
15:00 CET (UTC+01:00)	Gonzalo 14'; Roncaglia (yellow card) 36'; Jovetić 50'; Toni 54'; Pizarro (yellow card) 56'; Cuadrado 84'	Report	Casarini 42', (yellow card) 44'	Stadium: Stadio Artemio Franchi; Attendance: 19,533; Referee: Gianpaolo Calvarese

11 November 2012 12	Milan	1–3	Fiorentina	Milan
15:00 CET (UTC+01:00)	Bonera (yellow card) 30'; Pazzini 59'; Ambrosini (yellow card) 61'; Mexès (yellow card) 68'	Report	Aquilani 10', (yellow card) 63'; Pizarro (yellow card) 24'; Roncaglia (yellow card) 33'; Valero (yellow card) 34', (goal) 38'; El Hamdaoui 87'	Stadium: San Siro; Attendance: 36,180; Referee: Andrea Romeo

18 November 2012 13	Fiorentina	4–1	Atalanta	Florence
15:00 CET (UTC+01:00)	Gonzalo 5'; Pizarro (yellow card) 25'; Aquilani 42', 45+2'; Toni 49'	Report	Stendardo (yellow card) 19'; Bonaventura 32'; Cigarini (red card) 45+1'; Brivio (yellow card) 52'; Manfredini (yellow card) 56'; Cazzola (yellow card) 61'	Stadium: Stadio Artemio Franchi; Attendance: 27,219; Referee: Andrea De Marco

25 November 2012 14	Torino	2–2	Fiorentina	Turin
15:00 CET (UTC+01:00)	Cerci 40'; D'Ambrosio (yellow card) 73'; Birsa 76'	Report	Olivera (yellow card) 49'; Gonzalo 74' (pen.); El Hamdaoui 84'	Stadium: Stadio Olimpico di Torino; Attendance: 15,879; Referee: Antonio Damato

2 December 2012 15	Fiorentina	2–2	Sampdoria	Florence
20:45 CET (UTC+01:00)	Pizarro (yellow card) 6'; Savić 22', 75'	Report	Krstičić (yellow card) 13', (goal) 48'; Tissone (yellow card) 67'; Gonzalo 72' (o.g.); Berardi (yellow card) 77'; Mustafi (red card) 89'	Stadium: Stadio Artemio Franchi; Attendance: 24,049; Referee: Paolo Valeri

9 December 2012 16	Roma	4–2	Fiorentina	Rome
20:45 CET (UTC+01:00)	Castán 7'; Totti 19', 45+1'; Tachtsidis (yellow card) 22'; Osvaldo 89'	Report	Roncaglia 14', (yellow card) 81'; Olivera (yellow card) 22'; Cassani (yellow card) 35'; El Hamdaoui 46'; Gonzalo (yellow card) 68'; Cuadrado (yellow card) 72'	Stadium: Stadio Olimpico; Attendance: 41,689; Referee: Luca Banti

16 December 2012 17	Fiorentina	4–1	Siena	Florence
12:30 CET (UTC+01:00)	Toni 15', 79'; Pizarro 18' (pen.), (yellow card) 31'; Aquilani 44'; Roncaglia (yellow card) 61'	Report	Felipe (yellow card) 18'; Vergassola (yellow card) 31'; Neto (yellow card) 63'; Rosina (yellow card) 67'; Paci (yellow card) 69' (yellow-red card) 87'; Reginaldo 70'	Stadium: Stadio Artemio Franchi; Attendance: 22,455; Referee: Paolo Tagliavento

22 December 2012 18	Palermo	0–3	Fiorentina	Palermo
15:00 CET (UTC+01:00)	Muñoz (yellow card) 27'; Donati (yellow card) 82'; Pisano (yellow card) 85'	Report	Gonzalo (yellow card) 10', (goal) 89' (pen.); Migliaccio (yellow card) 32'; Jovetić 50', 83' (pen.); Cuadrado (yellow card) 54'; Cassani (yellow card) 90+2'	Stadium: Stadio Renzo Barbera; Attendance: 14,562; Referee: Domenico Celi

6 January 2013 19	Fiorentina	0–2	Pescara	Florence
15:00 CET (UTC+01:00)	Valero (yellow card) 70'	Report	Togni (yellow card) 5'; Çelik (yellow card) 34', (goal) 90+1'; Jonathas (yellow card) 36', (goal) 57'; Terlizzi (yellow card) 40'; Modesto (yellow card) 47'	Stadium: Stadio Artemio Franchi; Attendance: 22,903; Referee: Piero Giacomelli

13 January 2013 20	Udinese	3–1	Fiorentina	Udine
15:00 CET (UTC+01:00)	Pinzi (yellow card) 45'; Di Natale 45+2' (pen.), 66', (yellow card) 45+2'; Lazzari (yellow card) 59'; Muriel 67'	Report	Brkić 20' (o.g.); Aquilani (yellow card) 45+1'; Gonzalo (yellow card) 64'; Valero (yellow card) 90+3'	Stadium: Stadio Friuli; Attendance: 10,150; Referee: Andrea Romeo

20 January 2013 21	Fiorentina	1–1	Napoli	Florence
15:00 CET (UTC+01:00)	Toni (yellow card) 25'; Savić (yellow card) 28'; Roncaglia 33'; Gonzalo (yellow card) 37'	Report	Behrami (yellow card) 13'; Gamberini (yellow card) 17'; Inler (yellow card) 26'; Cavani 42'	Stadium: Stadio Artemio Franchi; Attendance: 28,632; Referee: Mauro Bergonzi

27 January 2013 22	Catania	2–1	Fiorentina	Catania
15:00 CET (UTC+01:00)	Capuano (yellow card) 19'; Bellusci (yellow card) 35'; Biagianti (yellow card) 37'; Legrottaglie 50'; Spolli (yellow card) 60'; Álvarez (yellow card) 86'; Castro 88', (yellow card) 90+2'	Report	Migliaccio 21'; Savić (yellow card) 32'; Cuadrado (yellow card) 64'; Aquilani (red card) 78'	Stadium: Stadio Angelo Massimino; Attendance: 14,500; Referee: Domenico Celi

3 February 2013 23	Fiorentina	2–0	Parma	Florence
15:00 CET (UTC+01:00)	Toni 28'; Jovetić 50'; Migliaccio (yellow card) 70'	Report	Rosi (yellow card) 45'; Sansone (yellow card) 49'; Marchionni (yellow card) 90'	Stadium: Stadio Artemio Franchi; Attendance: 19,672; Referee: Carmine Russo

10 February 2013 24	Juventus	2–0	Fiorentina	Turin
15:00 CET (UTC+01:00)	Vučinić 20'; Matri 42'; Marchisio (yellow card) 56'; Peluso (yellow card) 58'	Report	Cuadrado (yellow card) 52'; Viviano (yellow card) 75'; Pizarro (yellow card) 86'	Stadium: Juventus Stadium; Attendance: 38,551; Referee: Paolo Mazzoleni

17 February 2013 25	Fiorentina	4–1	Internazionale	Florence
15:00 CET (UTC+01:00)	Ljajić 13', 65'; Pasqual (yellow card) 27'; Jovetić 33', 55'; Pizarro (yellow card) 37'; Savić (yellow card) 71'	Report	Ranocchia (yellow card) 47'; Guarín (yellow card) 55'; Juan Jesus (yellow card) 59'; Pereira (yellow card) 67'; Cassano 87'	Stadium: Stadio Artemio Franchi; Attendance: 20,485; Referee: Nicola Rizzoli

24 February 2013 26	Bologna	2–1	Fiorentina	Bologna
15:00 CET (UTC+01:00)	Antonsson (yellow card) 29'; Diamanti (yellow card) 45'; Gabbiadini (yellow card) 52'; Motta 58'; Christodoulopoulos 84'	Report	Ljajić 27'; Cuadrado (yellow card) 57'; Aquilani (yellow card) 87'	Stadium: Stadio Renato Dall'Ara; Attendance: 17,890; Referee: Marco Guida

3 March 2013 27	Fiorentina	2–1	Chievo	Florence
15:00	Pasqual 4'; Pizarro (yellow card) 65'; Aquilani (yellow card) 71'; Larrondo 78'	Report	Rigoni (yellow card) 10'; Cofie 38'	Stadium: Stadio Artemio Franchi; Attendance: 22,071; Referee: Daniele Doveri

10 March 2013 28	Lazio	0–2	Fiorentina	Rome
20:45 CET (UTC+01:00)	Hernanes (yellow card) 51'; Dias (yellow card) 64'; González (yellow card) 69'; Cana (yellow card) 75'	Report	Jovetić 20'; Ljajić 49'; Rômulo (yellow card) 89'	Stadium: Stadio Olimpico; Attendance: 29,145; Referee: Andrea Gervasoni

17 March 2013 29	Fiorentina	3–2	Genoa	Florence
15:00 CET (UTC+01:00)	Aquilani 33'; Cuadrado 62'; Gonzalo (yellow card) 75'; Cassani 77' (o.g.); Valero (yellow card) 80'	Report	Antonelli (yellow card) 45', (goal) 69'; Portanova 58'; Granqvist (yellow card) 67'; Bertolacci (yellow card) 45+1' (yellow-red card) 75'; Jorquera (yellow card) 83'	Stadium: Stadio Artemio Franchi; Attendance: 21,319; Referee: Nicola Rizzoli

30 March 2013 30	Cagliari	2–1	Fiorentina	Quartu Sant'Elena
15:00 CEST (UTC+02:00)	Pinilla 11', 39' (pen.); Pisano (yellow card) 79'; Dessena (yellow card) 84'; Cossu (yellow card) 90'	Report	Gonzalo (yellow card) 25'; Cuadrado (yellow card) 38', (goal) 73'	Stadium: Stadio Is Arenas; Referee: Daniele Orsato

7 April 2013 31	Fiorentina	2–2	Milan	Florence
15:00 CEST (UTC+02:00)	Tomović (red card) 40'; Cuadrado (yellow card) 44'; Ljajić 66' (pen.); Aquilani (yellow card) 67'; Pizarro 73' (pen.); Roncaglia (yellow card) 81'	Report	Montolivo 14', (yellow card) 35'; Muntari (yellow card) 45'; Flamini 62'; Balotelli (yellow card) 71'	Stadium: Stadio Artemio Franchi; Attendance: 39,469; Referee: Paolo Tagliavento

14 April 2013 32	Atalanta	0–2	Fiorentina	Bergamo
15:00 CEST (UTC+02:00)	Stendardo (yellow card) 60'; Livaja (yellow card) 75'; Bonaventura (yellow card) 77'; Denis (red card) 90'	Report	Sissoko (yellow card) 25'; Pizarro 61' (pen.); Pasqual (yellow card) 63'; Larrondo 72', (yellow card) 78'	Stadium: Stadio Atleti Azzurri d'Italia; Attendance: 17,100; Referee: Carmine Russo

21 April 2013 33	Fiorentina	4–3	Torino	Florence
15:00 CEST (UTC+02:00)	Cuadrado 8', (yellow card) 50'; Aquilani 16'; Ljajić 33'; Rômulo 86'	Report	Darmian (yellow card) 32' (yellow-red card) 90+2'; Barreto 45'; Santana 56'; Cerci 77'; Vives (yellow card) 82'	Stadium: Stadio Artemio Franchi; Attendance: 33,994; Referee: Gianpaolo Calvarese

28 April 2013 34	Sampdoria	0–3	Fiorentina	Genoa
15:00 CEST (UTC+02:00)	Palombo (yellow card) 40'; Gastaldello (red card) 80'; Éder (yellow card) 86'	Report	Gonzalo (yellow card) 32'; Cuadrado 36'; Ljajić 41'; Aquilani (yellow card) 53', (goal) 73'; Savić (yellow card) 86'	Stadium: Stadio Luigi Ferraris; Attendance: 23,278; Referee: Nicola Rizzoli

5 May 2013 35	Fiorentina	0–1	Roma	Florence
15:00 CEST (UTC+02:00)	Tomović (yellow card) 65'; Toni (yellow card) 79'	Report	De Rossi (yellow card) 61'; Balzaretti (yellow card) 64'; Osvaldo 90+2', (yellow card) 90+3'	Stadium: Stadio Artemio Franchi; Attendance: 33,399; Referee: Paolo Mazzoleni

8 May 2013 36	Siena	0–1	Fiorentina	Siena
20:45 CEST (UTC+02:00)	Terlizzi (yellow card) 14'; Calello (yellow card) 28'; Vergassola (yellow card) 69'; Terzi (yellow card) 74'; Teixeira (yellow card) 76'; Rosina (yellow card) 90+3'	Report	Gonzalo 14'; Compper (yellow card) 16'; Migliaccio (yellow card) 88'	Stadium: Stadio Artemio Franchi – Montepaschi Arena; Attendance: 11,435; Referee: Daniele Orsato

12 May 2013 37	Fiorentina	1–0	Palermo	Florence
12:30 CEST (UTC+02:00)	Savić (yellow card) 16'; Toni 41'	Report	Faurlín (yellow card) 27'; Kurtić (yellow card) 61'; García (yellow card) 66'; Viola (yellow card) 78'	Stadium: Stadio Artemio Franchi; Attendance: 27,189; Referee: Antonio Damato

19 May 2013 38	Pescara	1–5	Fiorentina	Pescara
20:45 CEST (UTC+02:00)	Vittiglio 76'	Report	Ljajić 16', 24', 59'; Fernández 28'; Jovetić 54'	Stadium: Stadio Adriatico; Attendance: 9,607; Referee: Andrea De Marco

=== Coppa Italia ===
18 August 2012 Third round	Fiorentina	2–0	Novara	Florence
18:00 CET (UTC+01:00)	Ljajić 43'; Pasqual 54'		Alhassan (yellow card) 28'; Peverelli (yellow card) 80'	Stadium: Stadio Artemio Franchi; Attendance: 12,952; Referee: Davide Massa

28 November 2012 Fourth round	Fiorentina	2–0	Juve Stabia	Florence
21:00 CET (UTC+01:00)	Seferovic 52', (yellow card) 90'; Hegazi 73'		Dicuonzo (yellow card) 57'; Agyei (yellow card) 72'; Murolo (yellow card) 82' (red card) 89'	Stadium: Stadio Artemio Franchi; Attendance: 7,311; Referee: Domenico Celi

19 December 2012 Round of 16	Udinese	0–1	Fiorentina	Udine
16:30 CET (UTC+01:00)	Lazzari (yellow card) 45+1'; Pinzi (yellow card) 50'; Pereyra (yellow card) 85'		Aquilani (yellow card) 21'; Valero 36'; Cuadrado (yellow card) 78'; Jovetić (yellow card) 87'; Seferovic (yellow card) 90+1'	Stadium: Stadio Friuli; Attendance: 8,000; Referee: Gianpaolo Calvarese

16 January 2013 Quarter-finals	Fiorentina	0–1 (a.e.t.)	Roma	Florence
20:00 CET (UTC+01:00)	Aquilani (yellow card) 61'; Tomović (yellow card) 74'; Savić (yellow card) 120'; Cuadrado (red card) 120+2'; Neto (yellow card) 120+4'		Florenzi (yellow card) 37'; Burdisso (yellow card) 40'; Pjanić (yellow card) 43'; Castán (yellow card) 53'; Bradley (yellow card) 55'; Destro 97'; Taddei (yellow card) 115' (yellow-red card) 117'; Dodô (red card) 120+2'	Stadium: Stadio Artemio Franchi; Attendance: 20,003; Referee: Nicola Rizzoli

== Statistics ==
=== Appearances and goals ===
No.	Pos	Nat	Player	Total		Serie A		Coppa Italia	
No.	Pos	Nat	Player	Apps	Goals	Apps	Goals	Apps	Goals
Goalkeepers
1	GK	(Italy) ITA	Emiliano Viviano	32	0	32	0	0	0
12	GK	(Italy) ITA	Cristiano Lupatelli	1	0	0+1	0	0	0
89	GK	(Brazil) BRA	Neto	10	0	6	0	4	0
Defenders
2	DF	(Argentina) ARG	Gonzalo Rodríguez	38	6	35	6	3	0
3	DF	(Egypt) EGY	Ahmed Hegazi	3	1	0+2	0	1	1
4	DF	(Argentina) ARG	Facundo Roncaglia	26	3	24	3	2	0
5	DF	(Germany) GER	Marvin Compper	7	0	6+1	0	0	0
15	DF	(Montenegro) MNE	Stefan Savić	27	2	26	2	1	0
23	DF	(Italy) ITA	Manuel Pasqual	38	3	35	2	3	1
31	DF	(Italy) ITA	Michele Camporese	0	0	0	0	0	0
40	DF	(Serbia) SRB	Nenad Tomović	29	0	23+3	0	3	0
Midfielders
6	MF	(Mali) MLI	Mohamed Sissoko	5	0	1+4	0	0	0
7	MF	(Chile) CHI	David Pizarro	31	3	28+1	3	2	0
10	MF	(Italy) ITA	Alberto Aquilani	27	7	20+5	7	2	0
11	MF	(Colombia) COL	Juan Cuadrado	40	5	34+2	5	2+2	0
14	MF	(Chile) CHI	Matías Fernández	25	1	9+13	1	2+1	0
19	MF	(Argentina) ARG	Cristian Llama	7	0	1+4	0	1+1	0
20	MF	(Spain) ESP	Borja Valero	41	2	37	1	3+1	1
21	MF	(Italy) ITA	Giulio Migliaccio	27	1	9+15	1	2+1	0
27	MF	(Poland) POL	Rafał Wolski	1	0	0+1	0	0	0
92	MF	(Brazil) BRA	Rômulo	24	2	10+10	2	2+2	0
Forwards
8	FW	(Montenegro) MNE	Stevan Jovetić	34	13	31	13	2+1	0
9	FW	(Morocco) MAR	Mounir El Hamdaoui	20	3	3+16	3	1	0
18	FW	(Argentina) ARG	Marcelo Larrondo	7	2	2+5	2	0	0
22	FW	(Serbia) SRB	Adem Ljajić	31	12	21+7	11	2+1	1
30	FW	(Italy) ITA	Luca Toni	28	8	15+12	8	1	0
49	FW	(Italy) ITA	Giuseppe Rossi	1	0	0+1	0	0	0
Players transferred out during the season
5	MF	(Uruguay) URU	Rubén Olivera	4	0	4	0	0	0
15	DF	(Serbia) SRB	Matija Nastasić	1	0	1	0	0	0
16	DF	(Italy) ITA	Mattia Cassani	10	0	4+4	0	2	0
17	FW	(Switzerland) SUI	Haris Seferovic	9	1	1+6	0	2	1

Last updated: 19 May 2013
Source: Competitions

=== Goalscorers ===
Rank	No.	Pos	Nat	Name	Serie A	Coppa Italia	Total
1	8	FW	(Montenegro)	Stevan Jovetić	13	0	13
2	22	FW	(Serbia)	Adem Ljajić	11	1	12
3	30	FW	(Italy)	Luca Toni	8	0	8
4	10	MF	(Italy)	Alberto Aquilani	7	0	7
5	2	DF	(Argentina)	Gonzalo Rodríguez	6	0	6
6	11	MF	(Colombia)	Juan Cuadrado	5	0	5
7	4	DF	(Argentina)	Facundo Roncaglia	3	0	3
7	7	MF	(Chile)	David Pizarro	3	0	3
7	9	FW	(Morocco)	Mounir El Hamdaoui	3	0	3
7	23	DF	(Italy)	Manuel Pasqual	2	1	3
11	15	DF	(Montenegro)	Stefan Savić	2	0	2
11	18	FW	(Argentina)	Marcelo Larrondo	2	0	2
11	20	MF	(Spain)	Borja Valero	1	1	2
11	92	MF	(Brazil)	Rômulo	2	0	2
15	3	DF	(Egypt)	Ahmed Hegazi	0	1	1
15	14	MF	(Chile)	Matías Fernández	1	0	1
15	17	FW	(Switzerland)	Haris Seferovic	0	1	1
15	21	MF	(Italy)	Giulio Migliaccio	1	0	1
Own goal					2	0	2
Totals					72	5	77

Last updated: 19 May 2013

=== Clean sheets ===
Rank	No.	Pos	Nat	Name	Serie A	Coppa Italia	Total
1	1	GK	(Italy)	Emiliano Viviano	11	0	11
2	89	GK	(Brazil)	Neto	1	3	4
Totals					12	3	15

Last updated: 19 May 2013

=== Disciplinary record ===
No.	Pos	Nat	Name	Serie A			Coppa Italia			Total		
No.	Pos	Nat	Name	Booked	(yellow card) (yellow-red card)	Sent off (straight red)	Booked	(yellow card) (yellow-red card)	Sent off (straight red)	Booked	(yellow card) (yellow-red card)	Sent off (straight red)
1	GK	(Italy)	Emiliano Viviano	1	0	0	0	0	0	1	0	0
12	GK	(Italy)	Cristiano Lupatelli	0	0	0	0	0	0	0	0	0
24	GK	(Italy)	Luca Lezzerini	0	0	0	0	0	0	0	0	0
89	GK	(Brazil)	Neto	1	0	0	1	0	0	2	0	0
2	DF	(Argentina)	Gonzalo Rodríguez	9	1	0	0	0	0	9	1	0
3	DF	(Egypt)	Ahmed Hegazi	0	0	0	0	0	0	0	0	0
4	DF	(Argentina)	Facundo Roncaglia	9	0	0	0	0	0	9	0	0
5	DF	(Germany)	Marvin Compper	1	0	0	0	0	0	1	0	0
15	DF	(Serbia)	Matija Nastasić	0	0	0	0	0	0	0	0	0
15	DF	(Montenegro)	Stefan Savić	5	0	0	1	0	0	6	0	0
16	DF	(Italy)	Mattia Cassani	2	0	0	0	0	0	2	0	0
23	DF	(Italy)	Manuel Pasqual	4	0	0	0	0	0	4	0	0
31	DF	(Italy)	Michele Camporese	0	0	0	0	0	0	0	0	0
40	DF	(Serbia)	Nenad Tomović	4	0	1	1	0	0	5	0	1
5	MF	(Uruguay)	Rubén Olivera	4	0	0	0	0	0	4	0	0
6	MF	(Mali)	Mohamed Sissoko	1	0	0	0	0	0	1	0	0
7	MF	(Chile)	David Pizarro	13	0	0	0	0	0	13	0	0
10	MF	(Italy)	Alberto Aquilani	6	0	1	2	0	0	8	0	1
11	MF	(Colombia)	Juan Cuadrado	11	0	0	1	0	1	12	0	1
14	MF	(Chile)	Matías Fernández	1	0	0	0	0	0	1	0	0
18	MF	(Italy)	Francesco Della Rocca	0	0	0	0	0	0	0	0	0
19	MF	(Argentina)	Cristian Llama	0	0	0	0	0	0	0	0	0
20	MF	(Spain)	Borja Valero	4	0	0	0	0	0	4	0	0
21	MF	(Italy)	Giulio Migliaccio	5	0	0	0	0	0	5	0	0
27	MF	(Poland)	Rafał Wolski	0	0	0	0	0	0	0	0	0
92	MF	(Brazil)	Rômulo	1	0	0	0	0	0	1	0	0
8	FW	(Montenegro)	Stevan Jovetić	3	0	0	1	0	0	4	0	0
9	FW	(Morocco)	Mounir El Hamdaoui	0	0	0	0	0	0	0	0	0
17	FW	(Switzerland)	Haris Seferovic	0	0	0	2	0	0	2	0	0
18	FW	(Argentina)	Marcelo Larrondo	1	0	0	0	0	0	1	0	0
22	FW	(Serbia)	Adem Ljajić	2	0	0	0	0	0	2	0	0
30	FW	(Italy)	Luca Toni	3	0	0	0	0	0	3	0	0
49	FW	(Italy)	Giuseppe Rossi	0	0	0	0	0	0	0	0	0
Totals				91	1	2	9	0	1	100	1	3

Last updated: 19 May 2013
