= Carlos Fonseca (disambiguation) =

Carlos Fonseca (1936–1976) was a Nicaraguan politician, teacher and librarian who founded the Sandinista National Liberation Front.

Carlos Fonseca may also refer to:

- Carlos Fonseca (football manager) (born 1981), Spanish football manager
- Carlos Fonseca (footballer, born 1985), Portuguese football goalkeeper
- Carlos Fonseca (footballer, born 1987), Portuguese footballer for FC Tobol
- Carlos Fonseca (boxer) (born 1955), boxer from Brazil
- Carlos Esteban Fonseca, Puerto Rican television actor
