= Thomas Vollnhofer =

Austrian footballer

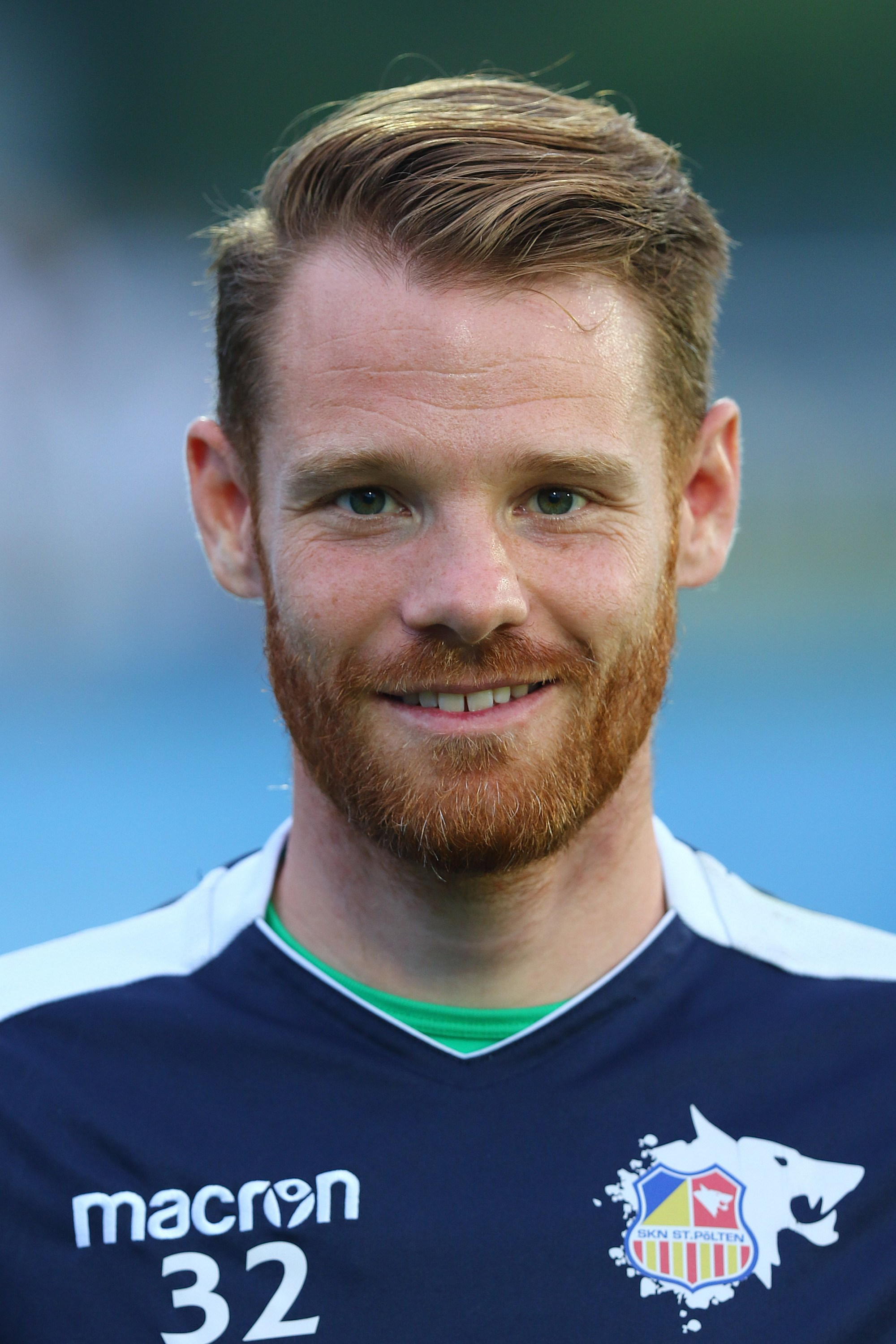

Personal information
- Full name: Thomas Vollnhofer
- Date of birth: 2 September 1984 (age 42)
- Place of birth: Oberpullendorf, Austria
- Height: 1.80 m (5 ft 11 in)
- Position: Goalkeeper

Team information
- Current team: SKN St. Pölten II
- Number: 32

Youth career
- 1990–1998: USC Kirchschlag
- 1998–2002: BNZ St. Pölten

Senior career*
Years	Team	Apps	(Gls)
2002–2012	SKN St. Pölten	232	(0)
2012–2015	Wiener Neustadt	66	(0)
2015–2016	First Vienna	30	(0)
2016–2020	SKN St. Pölten	17	(0)
2016–	SKN St. Pölten II	21	(0)

International career
2000–2001	Austria U16		
2001–2002	Austria U17	13	(0)
2002–2003	Austria U19		
Medal record
Representing Austria
UEFA European Under-19 Championship
Third place	Liechtenstein 2003	U-19 Team
- * Club domestic league appearances and goals as of 6 June 2022

Thomas Vollnhofer (born 2 September 1984) is an Austrian footballer who plays as a goalkeeper for SKN St. Pölten II.

== International career ==
Between 2000 and 2003, Vollnhofer was capped for various Austrian national youth teams, representing his country at under-16, under-17 and under-19 level. For the U19, he was capped a total of 13 times under coach Paul Gludovatz. He was part of the team winning the third place in the 2003 UEFA European Under-19 Championship.

== Honours ==
Austria U19

- UEFA European Under-19 Championship third place: 2003
