= 2003 UEFA European Under-19 Championship qualification =

The 2003 UEFA European Under-19 Championship qualifying competition was a men's under-19 football competition played in 2002 and 2003 to determine the seven teams joining Liechtenstein, who qualified automatically as hosts, in the 2003 UEFA European Under-19 Championship final tournament.

== First qualifying round ==
The first qualifying round saw 22 teams (11 group winners and runners-up) qualify for the second qualifying round.

=== Byes ===
The following teams received a bye for this round:

- Austria
- Czech Republic
- Greece
- Liechtenstein (main tournament host)
- Portugal
- Republic of Ireland
- Spain

=== Group 1 ===
Team	Pld	W	D	L	GF	GA	GD	Pts
Italy	3	3	0	0	9	3	+6	9
Slovakia	3	2	0	1	6	4	+2	6
Lithuania	3	1	0	2	7	6	+1	3
Armenia	3	0	0	3	2	11	−9	0

All matches were played in Lithuania.

Italy	4–1	Armenia
Lithuania	1–3	Slovakia
Italy	3–1	Lithuania
Armenia	1–2	Slovakia
Slovakia	1–2	Italy
Armenia	0–5	Lithuania

=== Group 2 ===
Team	Pld	W	D	L	GF	GA	GD	Pts
Poland	3	2	1	0	2	0	+2	7
Sweden	3	1	2	0	3	2	+1	5
Croatia	3	1	1	1	2	2	0	4
Belarus	3	0	0	3	3	6	−3	0

All matches were played in Sweden.

Poland	1–0	Belarus
Sweden	0–0	Croatia
Belarus	1–2	Croatia
Poland	0–0	Sweden
Croatia	0–1	Poland
Belarus	2–3	Sweden

=== Group 3 ===
Team	Pld	W	D	L	GF	GA	GD	Pts
England	3	3	0	0	16	0	+16	9
Macedonia	3	2	0	1	6	4	+2	6
Romania	3	1	0	2	6	10	−4	3
Moldova	3	0	0	3	3	17	−14	0

All matches were played in England.

Romania	6–2	Moldova
Macedonia	0–3	England
Romania	0–4	Macedonia
Moldova	0–9	England
England	4–0	Romania
Moldova	1–2	Macedonia

=== Group 4 ===
Team	Pld	W	D	L	GF	GA	GD	Pts
Netherlands	3	2	1	0	8	1	+7	7
Latvia	3	1	1	1	3	5	−2	4
Turkey	3	1	1	1	3	3	0	4
Finland	3	0	1	2	1	6	−5	1

All matches were played in Latvia.

Finland	1–1	Latvia
Turkey	1–1	Netherlands
Finland	0–2	Turkey
Latvia	0–4	Netherlands
Netherlands	3–0	Finland
Latvia	2–0	Turkey

=== Group 5 ===
Team	Pld	W	D	L	GF	GA	GD	Pts
Germany	3	3	0	0	21	1	+20	9
Israel	3	2	0	1	9	4	+5	6
Azerbaijan	3	1	0	2	3	11	−8	3
San Marino	3	0	0	3	0	17	−17	0

All matches were played in Germany.

Israel	4–0	Azerbaijan
San Marino	0–10	Germany
Azerbaijan	0–7	Germany
Israel	4–0	San Marino
Germany	4–1	Israel
Azerbaijan	3–0	San Marino

=== Group 6 ===
Team	Pld	W	D	L	GF	GA	GD	Pts
Denmark	3	3	0	0	7	1	+6	9
Switzerland	3	2	0	1	8	2	+6	6
Bulgaria	3	1	0	2	4	6	−2	3
Estonia	3	0	0	3	2	12	−10	0

All matches were played in Switzerland.

Estonia	1–4	Denmark
Switzerland	3–1	Bulgaria
Bulgaria	0–2	Denmark
Switzerland	5–0	Estonia
Denmark	1–0	Switzerland
Bulgaria	3–1	Estonia

=== Group 7 ===
Team	Pld	W	D	L	GF	GA	GD	Pts
Cyprus	3	3	0	0	6	1	+5	9
Norway	3	2	0	1	8	3	+5	6
Malta	3	0	1	2	2	6	−4	1
Bosnia and Herzegovina	3	0	1	2	5	11	−6	1

All matches were played in Cyprus.

Norway	2–0	Malta
Cyprus	3–1	Bosnia and Herzegovina
Norway	0–1	Cyprus
Malta	2–2	Bosnia and Herzegovina
Bosnia and Herzegovina	2–6	Norway
Malta	0–2	Cyprus

=== Group 8 ===
Team	Pld	W	D	L	GF	GA	GD	Pts
Georgia	3	2	0	1	4	1	+3	6
Belgium	3	2	0	1	4	2	+2	6
Ukraine	3	2	0	1	8	3	+5	6
Faroe Islands	3	0	0	3	0	10	−10	0

All matches were played in Georgia.

Belgium	1–0	Georgia
Faroe Islands	0–6	Ukraine
Belgium	2–0	Faroe Islands
Georgia	2–0	Ukraine
Ukraine	2–1	Belgium
Georgia	2–0	Faroe Islands

=== Group 9 ===
Team	Pld	W	D	L	GF	GA	GD	Pts
France	3	3	0	0	14	0	+14	9
Russia	3	2	0	1	8	1	+7	6
Luxembourg	3	1	0	2	2	8	−6	3
Albania	3	0	0	3	1	16	−15	0

All matches were played in Russia.

France	4–0	Luxembourg
Albania	0–5	Russia
France	9–0	Albania
Luxembourg	0–3	Russia
Russia	0–1	France
Luxembourg	2–1	Albania

=== Group 10 ===
Team	Pld	W	D	L	GF	GA	GD	Pts
Slovenia	3	2	0	1	7	4	+3	6
FR Yugoslavia	3	2	0	1	8	6	+2	6
Scotland	3	2	0	1	5	6	−1	6
Iceland	3	0	0	3	3	7	−4	0

All matches were played in Slovenia.

FR Yugoslavia	3–1	Iceland
Slovenia	1–2	Scotland
Scotland	1–4	FR Yugoslavia
Iceland	1–2	Slovenia
FR Yugoslavia	1–4	Slovenia
Iceland	1–2	Scotland

=== Group 11 ===
Team	Pld	W	D	L	GF	GA	GD	Pts
Hungary	3	3	0	0	11	1	+10	9
Northern Ireland	3	2	0	1	9	2	+7	6
Wales	3	1	0	2	2	9	−7	3
Andorra	3	0	0	3	0	10	−10	0

All matches were played in Northern Ireland.

Northern Ireland	4–0	Andorra
Wales	0–5	Hungary
Northern Ireland	4–0	Wales
Andorra	0–4	Hungary
Hungary	2–1	Northern Ireland
Andorra	0–2	Wales

== Second qualifying round ==
The second qualifying round saw seven group winners qualify for the main tournament in Liechtenstein.

=== Teams ===
The following teams qualified for this round:

11 group winners from the first qualifying round.

- Cyprus
- Denmark
- England
- France
- Georgia
- Germany
- Hungary
- Italy
- Netherlands
- Poland
- Slovenia

11 group runners-up from the first qualifying round

- Belgium
- Israel
- Latvia
- Macedonia
- Northern Ireland
- Norway
- Russia
- Serbia and Montenegro (as FR Yugoslavia in previous round)
- Slovakia
- Sweden
- Switzerland

6 teams received a bye for the first qualifying round

- Austria
- Czech Republic
- Greece
- Portugal
- Republic of Ireland
- Spain

=== Group 1 ===
All matches were played in Germany.

Teams	Pld	W	D	L	GF	GA	GD	Pts
Czech Republic	3	2	1	0	3	1	+2	7
Belgium	3	1	2	0	3	2	+1	5
Germany	3	1	1	1	11	8	+3	4
Slovakia	3	0	0	3	4	10	–6	0

Czech Republic	1–0	Slovakia
Germany	2–2	Belgium
Czech Republic	2–1	Germany
Slovakia	0–1	Belgium
Belgium	0–0	Czech Republic
Slovakia	4–8	Germany

=== Group 2 ===
All matches were played in France.

Teams	Pld	W	D	L	GF	GA	GD	Pts
France	3	2	1	0	5	1	+4	7
Spain	3	1	1	1	3	2	+1	4
Israel	3	1	0	2	5	6	–1	3
Poland	3	1	0	2	2	6	–4	3

Spain	1–2	Poland
Israel	1–4	France
Spain	2–0	Israel
Poland	0–1	France
France	0–0	Spain
Poland	0–4	Israel

=== Group 3 ===
All matches were played in Portugal.

Teams	Pld	W	D	L	GF	GA	GD	Pts
Portugal	3	2	1	0	7	2	+5	7
Russia	3	2	1	0	5	2	+3	7
Denmark	3	1	0	2	5	7	–2	3
Sweden	3	0	0	3	3	9	–6	0

Portugal	4–1	Sweden
Denmark	1–3	Russia
Portugal	3–1	Denmark
Sweden	1–2	Russia
Russia	0–0	Portugal
Sweden	1–3	Denmark

=== Group 4 ===
All matches were played in Ireland.

Teams	Pld	W	D	L	GF	GA	GD	Pts
England	3	3	0	0	5	0	+5	9
Republic of Ireland	3	2	0	1	5	3	+2	6
Slovenia	3	1	0	2	2	6	–4	3
Switzerland	3	0	0	3	3	6	–3	0

Republic of Ireland	0–1	England
Switzerland	1–2	Slovenia
Republic of Ireland	3–2	Switzerland
England	3–0	Slovenia
Slovenia	0–2	Republic of Ireland
England	1–0	Switzerland

=== Group 5 ===
All matches were played in Austria. Serbia and Montenegro participated as FR Yugoslavia in the first qualifying round.

Teams	Pld	W	D	L	GF	GA	GD	Pts
Austria	3	3	0	0	9	1	+8	9
Serbia and Montenegro	3	2	0	1	10	3	+7	6
Macedonia	3	0	1	2	2	9	–7	1
Cyprus	3	0	1	2	2	10	–8	1

Austria	3–1	Macedonia
Cyprus	1–5	Serbia and Montenegro
Austria	4–0	Cyprus
Macedonia	0–5	Serbia and Montenegro
Serbia and Montenegro	0–2	Austria
Macedonia	1–1	Cyprus

=== Group 6 ===
All matches were played in Hungary.

Teams	Pld	W	D	L	GF	GA	GD	Pts
Norway	3	2	1	0	4	2	+2	7
Hungary	3	2	0	1	8	5	+3	6
Netherlands	3	0	2	1	3	5	–2	2
Greece	3	0	1	2	3	6	–3	1

Greece	1–1	Netherlands
Norway	2–1	Hungary
Greece	0–1	Norway
Netherlands	1–3	Hungary
Hungary	4–2	Greece
Netherlands	1–1	Norway

=== Group 7 ===
All matches were played in Italy.

Teams	Pld	W	D	L	GF	GA	GD	Pts
Italy	3	3	0	0	9	2	+7	9
Georgia	3	1	1	1	4	4	0	4
Latvia	3	1	0	2	2	6	–4	3
Northern Ireland	3	0	1	2	1	4	–3	1

Italy	4–1	Latvia
Georgia	1–1	Northern Ireland
Italy	3–1	Georgia
Latvia	1–0	Northern Ireland
Northern Ireland	0–2	Italy
Latvia	0–2	Georgia

== See also ==
- 2003 UEFA European Under-19 Championship
