= Flávio Igor =

Portuguese footballer (born 1984)

Personal information
- Full name: Flávio Igor Rodrigues Silva Pereira Ferreira
- Date of birth: 10 February 1984 (age 42)
- Place of birth: Gondomar, Portugal
- Height: 1.67 m (5 ft 5 1/2 in)
- Position: Midfielder

Team information
- Current team: Sousense
- Number: 16

Youth career
- 1998–2003: Porto

Senior career*
Years	Team	Apps	(Gls)
2001–2005	Porto B		
2005–2006	Vitória de Setúbal B		
2006–2008	Vila Meã		
2008–2009	Tirsense		
2009–2011	Chaves	9	(0)
2011–2012	Famalicão	29	(1)
2012–2013	Ribeirão	24	(0)
2013–2014	Fátima	5	(1)
2014–	Sousense	82	(5)
- * Club domestic league appearances and goals as of 12 March 2017

Flávio Igor Rodrigues Silva Pereira Ferreira, known as Flávio Igor (born 10 February 1984) is a Portuguese football player who plays for Sousense.

== Club career ==
He made his professional debut in the Segunda Liga for Chaves on 8 November 2009 in a game against Santa Clara.

== International ==
He represented Portugal at the 2003 UEFA European Under-19 Championship, at which Portugal were the runners-up.
