= Daniel Kofi Agyei =

Ghanaian footballer (born 1992)

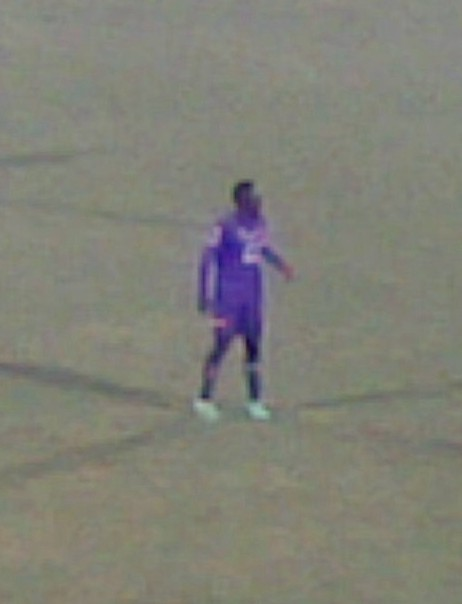

Personal information
- Date of birth: 1 January 1992 (age 34)
- Place of birth: Accra, Greater Accra, Ghana
- Height: 1.78 m (5 ft 10 in)
- Position: Midfielder

Team information
- Current team: Carrarese Giovani

Senior career*
Years	Team	Apps	(Gls)
2010–2013	Fiorentina	1	(0)
2012–2013	→ Juve Stabia (loan)	18	(0)
2013–2017	Benevento	51	(2)
2015–2016	→ Casertana (loan)	25	(2)
2016–2017	→ Ancona (loan)	31	(1)
2017–2021	Carrarese	88	(0)
2021–	Casale	0	(0)
- * Club domestic league appearances and goals as of 2 May 2021

Daniel Kofi Agyei (born 1 January 1992) is a Ghanaian professional footballer who plays for Italian club Casale as a midfielder.

== Career ==
Agyei made his Serie A debut for Fiorentina on 16 May 2010 in a match against Bari when he came on as a substitute in the 48th minute for Marco Donadel.

On 4 July 2012, he moved to S.S. Juve Stabia on loan

On 2 September 2013, Benevento buy the Co-ownership from Fiorentina. On 17 June 2014 remain in co-ownership to Benevento for another year.

On 25 June 2015, Benevento buy all part of the player.

On 22 October 2021, he signed with the Serie D club Casale.

== Career statistics ==
As of 21 May 2010

Club performance			League		Cup		Continental		Total	
Season	Club	League	Apps	Goals	Apps	Goals	Apps	Goals	Apps	Goals
Italy			League		Coppa Italia		Europe		Total	
2009–10	Fiorentina	Serie A	1	0	0	0	0	0	1	0
2010–11	Fiorentina	Serie A	0	0	0	0	0	0	0	0
2011–12	Fiorentina	Serie A	0	0	0	0	0	0	1	0
			League		Cup		Continental		Total	
Total	Italy		1	0	0	0	0	0	1	0
Career total			1	0	0	0	0	0	1	0
