= Magnus Hjulstad =

Norwegian footballer (born 1984)

Magnus Sjønnesen Hjulstad (born 15 March 1984) is a retired Norwegian football goalkeeper.

Hjulstad played youth football for Klemetsrud IL and Nordstrand IF. He was capped twice for both Norway u-17, u-18 and u-19. In 2002, he joined Vålerenga.

In 2004, he joined Drøbak-Frogn, first on loan and then permanent. In late 2005 he was loaned to Fredrikstad FK for the last month of the season as a backup. He went on to Strømsgodset IF in 2006. In 2008, he signed for Lørenskog IF. After two seasons there, he was once again back in the Tippeligaen, with Sarpsborg 08 FF in 2010.

After the 2011 season he signed for a newly promoted First Division club, Bærum SK. After only half a year, he went on to Hønefoss in mid-2012. He played throughout 2013.
