= João Pedro (footballer, born 1984) =

Portuguese footballer

- João Pedro as a União Lamas player

Personal information
- Full name: João Pedro Henriques Neto
- Date of birth: 11 September 1984 (age 42)
- Place of birth: Porto, Portugal
- Height: 1.78 m (5 ft 10 in)
- Position: Midfielder

Youth career
- 1992–1999: Boavista
- 1999–2000: Pasteleira
- 2000–2003: Boavista

Senior career*
Years	Team	Apps	(Gls)
2003–2007	Boavista	9	(0)
2003–2004	→ Ermesinde (loan)	31	(3)
2005–2006	→ Beira-Mar (loan)	10	(0)
2006–2007	→ União Lamas (loan)	18	(1)
2007–2008	ASIL Lysi	15	(0)
2008–2009	Digenis Akritas	14	(0)
2009–2011	Gondomar	43	(1)
2011–2012	Doxa	20	(2)
2014	Cinfães	5	(0)
Total		165	(7)

International career
2003	Portugal U19	2	(0)
- * Club domestic league appearances and goals

João Pedro Henriques Neto (born 11 September 1984 in Porto), known as João Pedro, is a former Portuguese footballer who played as a midfielder.
