= Franz-Josef Vogt =

Liechtenstein footballer

Personal information
- Date of birth: 30 October 1985 (age 40)
- Place of birth: Triesen, Liechtenstein
- Position: Defender

Team information
- Current team: FC Balzers II (Head coach)

Senior career*
Years	Team	Apps	(Gls)
2002–2010	FC Balzers	15	(0)
2005–2006	→ FC Chur 97 (loan)		
2010–2013	USV Eschen/Mauren	39	(1)
2013–2014	FC Buchs	0	(0)
2016–2019	FC Balzers II		

International career
2003–2013	Liechtenstein	29	(0)

Managerial career
- 2019–2020: FC Balzers II
- * Club domestic league appearances and goals

Franz-Josef Vogt (born 30 October 1985) is a Liechtensteiner football coach and former player who also served as head coach of FC Balzers II.

== Career ==
Vogt played club football for FC Buchs from 2013 to 2014, and formerly played for USV Eschen/Mauren, FC Balzers and FC Chur 97.

In the summer 2019, he was hired as head coach of FC Balzers II
