= Cristian Llama =

Argentine footballer

Personal information
- Full name: Cristian Ezequiel Llama
- Date of birth: June 26, 1986 (age 40)
- Place of birth: Lomas de Zamora, Argentina
- Height: 1.80 m (5 ft 11 in)
- Position: Midfielder

Team information
- Current team: Akragas

Youth career
- Arsenal de Sarandí

Senior career*
Years	Team	Apps	(Gls)
2004–2007	Arsenal de Sarandí	57	(6)
2007–2013	Catania	70	(3)
2008	→ Newell's Old Boys (loan)	3	(0)
2012–2013	→ Fiorentina (loan)	5	(0)
2013–2014	Veracruz	15	(0)
2014–2016	Colón	21	(5)
2016–2017	Aldosivi	27	(1)
2017–2018	Gimnasia Mendoza	11	(2)
2018–2019	Catania	25	(0)
2020–2021	Gimnasia Mendoza	39	(7)
2022	Mushuc Runa	6	(0)
2022–2023	San Martín Tucumán	4	(0)
2023–	Akragas	0	(0)
- * Club domestic league appearances and goals as of 16:54, 31 July 2022 (UTC)

Cristian Ezequiel Llama (born June 26, 1986) is an Argentine football midfielder who plays for Italian Serie D club Akragas.

== Club career ==
=== Arsenal de Sarandí ===
Llama began his professional career in his home country of Argentina in 2004, with Arsenal de Sarandí. In his first season with the club, Llama made 16 appearances and scored 2 goals. In his second season, he went on to make an additional 19 appearances. However, the player really thrived in his third season, where he made 23 league starts and managed 4 goals. His impressive displays caught the eyes of numerous European clubs, most notably from Italy, Spain, and Switzerland.

=== Calcio Catania ===
On 30 June 2012, the young Argentine completed his European transfer, joining Italian Serie A side Catania. The player found playing time hard to come by in his first season at the club due to the presence of wingers Juan Manuel Vargas, Jorge Andres Martinez, Mariano Izco, and Giacomo Tedesco. After four months in Sicily, the player made just one appearance and was, therefore, loaned out to Newell's Old Boys, for the second half of the 2007–08 season, in time for the Argentine Clausura. However, the loan move was unsuccessful, and Llama was limited to just three appearances due to injury. After six months in Argentina he was brought back to Catania under new coach Walter Zenga. In his first full season in Sicily, Llama was regularly featured in Zenga's plans and made 19 appearances in all competitions. He was also a regular during the 2009–10 season, under coach Gianluca Atzori and later, Siniša Mihajlović, on the left wing, until a major injury struck in March 2010. Before the injury, Llama had made 23 league starts scoring two goals and was the "in-form" player following Mihajlovic's appointment as head coach on 8 December 2009. His return was not complete until December 2010. Llama made just 30 league appearances for the Elefante over the next two seasons.

On 31 August 2012, Llama was sent out on a season-long loan deal to fellow Serie A outfit, Fiorentina, where he rejoined former Catania coach, Vincenzo Montella. However, after just five league appearances, the player returned to Sicily on 30 June 2013.

After five years playing back home in Argentina, he returned to Catania on 20 July 2018. He was released from his Catania contract by mutual consent on 20 December 2019.

=== Return to Argentina ===
In December 2019, Llama signed with Gimnasia Mendoza and returned to the club on 1 January 2020. In January 2022, Llama moved to Ecuadorian Serie A side Mushuc Runa. Llama returned to his homeland in June 2022, as he signed with San Martín de Tucumán.

=== Second return to Sicily ===
On 3 July 2023, Llama agreed to return to Sicily, joining newly promoted Serie D club Akragas.
