= Abdelaziz Kamara =

Mauritanian footballer (born 1984)

Personal information
- Full name: Abdelhazzi Kamaradimo
- Date of birth: 10 April 1984 (age 42)
- Place of birth: Saint-Denis, France
- Height: 1.86 m (6 ft 1 in)
- Position: Defender

Youth career
- 2000–2005: Saint-Étienne

Senior career*
Years	Team	Apps	(Gls)
2003–2005	Saint-Étienne B	60	(0)
2005–2006	Saint-Étienne	3	(0)
2006–2008	Châteauroux	6	(0)
2008–2009	Stade Nyonnais	16	(0)
2009–2010	Farul Constanţa		
2010–2011	Canet Roussillon		
2011–2014	SNID		

International career
1998	France U16	1	(0)
2000	France U18	9	(0)
2006–2013	Mauritania	16	(0)
- * Club domestic league appearances and goals

Abdelhazzi Kamaradimo (born 10 April 1984) is a former professional footballer who played as a defender. Born in France, he played for the Mauritania national team.
