= Miguel Ângelo (footballer, born 1984) =

Portuguese footballer

Personal information
- Full name: Miguel Ângelo Ferreira de Castro
- Date of birth: 10 October 1984 (age 42)
- Place of birth: Lisbon, Portugal
- Height: 1.85 m (6 ft 1 in)
- Position: Centre-back

Youth career
- 1993–1996: Sanjoanense Lisboa
- 1996–2003: Sporting CP

Senior career*
Years	Team	Apps	(Gls)
2003–2006	Sporting CP B	27	(2)
2004–2005	→ Casa Pia (loan)	38	(4)
2005–2006	→ Barreirense (loan)	27	(1)
2006–2009	Trofense	46	(1)
2007–2008	→ Portimonense (loan)	28	(5)
2009–2010	Marítimo	2	(1)
2010	→ Olhanense (loan)	13	(0)
2010–2011	APOP	24	(0)
2011–2013	Arouca	25	(2)
2013–2016	Chaves	71	(3)
2016–2017	Cova Piedade	29	(1)
2017–2019	Pinhalnovense	60	(1)
2019–2020	Sintrense	23	(1)
2020–2022	Olímpico Montijo	41	(2)
Total		454	(24)

International career
2002	Portugal U18	5	(0)
2002–2003	Portugal U19	14	(0)
2005	Portugal U21	2	(0)
2006	Portugal B	1	(0)
- * Club domestic league appearances and goals

Miguel Ângelo Ferreira de Castro (born 10 October 1984), known as Miguel Ângelo, is a Portuguese former professional footballer who played as a central defender.

== Club career ==
Born in Lisbon, Miguel Ângelo joined Sporting CP's academy at the age of 11. He made his senior debut with their reserves in the third division, then proceeded to be loaned to Casa Pia A.C. and F.C. Barreirense, the latter club competing in the Segunda Liga where he first appeared as a professional.

Miguel Ângelo spent most of his career in the second tier, amassing totals of 202 matches and 12 goals over nine seasons while representing, other than Barreirense, C.D. Trofense, Portimonense SC, F.C. Arouca, G.D. Chaves and C.D. Cova da Piedade. His Primeira Liga input consisted of 25 games with Trofense in 2008–09 (one goal, team relegation), two with C.S. Marítimo and 13 with S.C. Olhanense both in the following campaign.

Miguel Ângelo returned to division three in the summer of 2017, signing with C.D. Pinhalnovense. Two years later, he joined S.U. Sintrense.

== International career ==
Miguel Ângelo won the first of his two caps for Portugal at under-21 level on 8 February 2005, when he played the second half of the 2–0 friendly win against the Republic of Ireland held in Rio Maior.

== Career statistics ==
As of match played on 4 April 2015

Club	Season	League			Cup		Other		Total	
Club	Season	Division	Apps	Goals	Apps	Goals	Apps	Goals	Apps	Goals
Sporting CP B	2003–04	Segunda Divisão	27	2	—		—		27	2
Casa Pia (loan)	2004–05	Segunda Divisão	38	4	—		—		8	1
Barreirense (loan)	2005–06	Segunda Liga	27	1	2	1	—		29	2
Trofense	2006–07	Segunda Liga	21	0	0	0	—		21	0
Trofense	2008–09	Primeira Liga	25	1	5	0	—		30	1
Trofense	Total		46	1	5	0	—		51	1
Portimonense	2007–08	Segunda Liga	28	5	6	0	—		34	5
Marítimo	2009–10	Primeira Liga	2	1	2	0	—		4	1
Olhanense (loan)	2009–10	Primeira Liga	13	0	0	0	—		13	0
APOP	2010–11	Cypriot First Division	24	0	0	0	—		24	0
Arouca	2011–12	Segunda Liga	14	1	2	0	—		16	1
Arouca	2012–13	Segunda Liga	11	1	2	0	—		13	1
Arouca	Total		25	2	4	0	—		29	2
Chaves	2013–14	Segunda Liga	19	2	3	0	—		22	2
Chaves	2014–15	Segunda Liga	23	0	4	1	—		27	1
Chaves	Total		42	2	7	1	—		49	3
Career total			272	18	26	2	0	0	298	20
