= Mario Bolter =

Austrian footballer

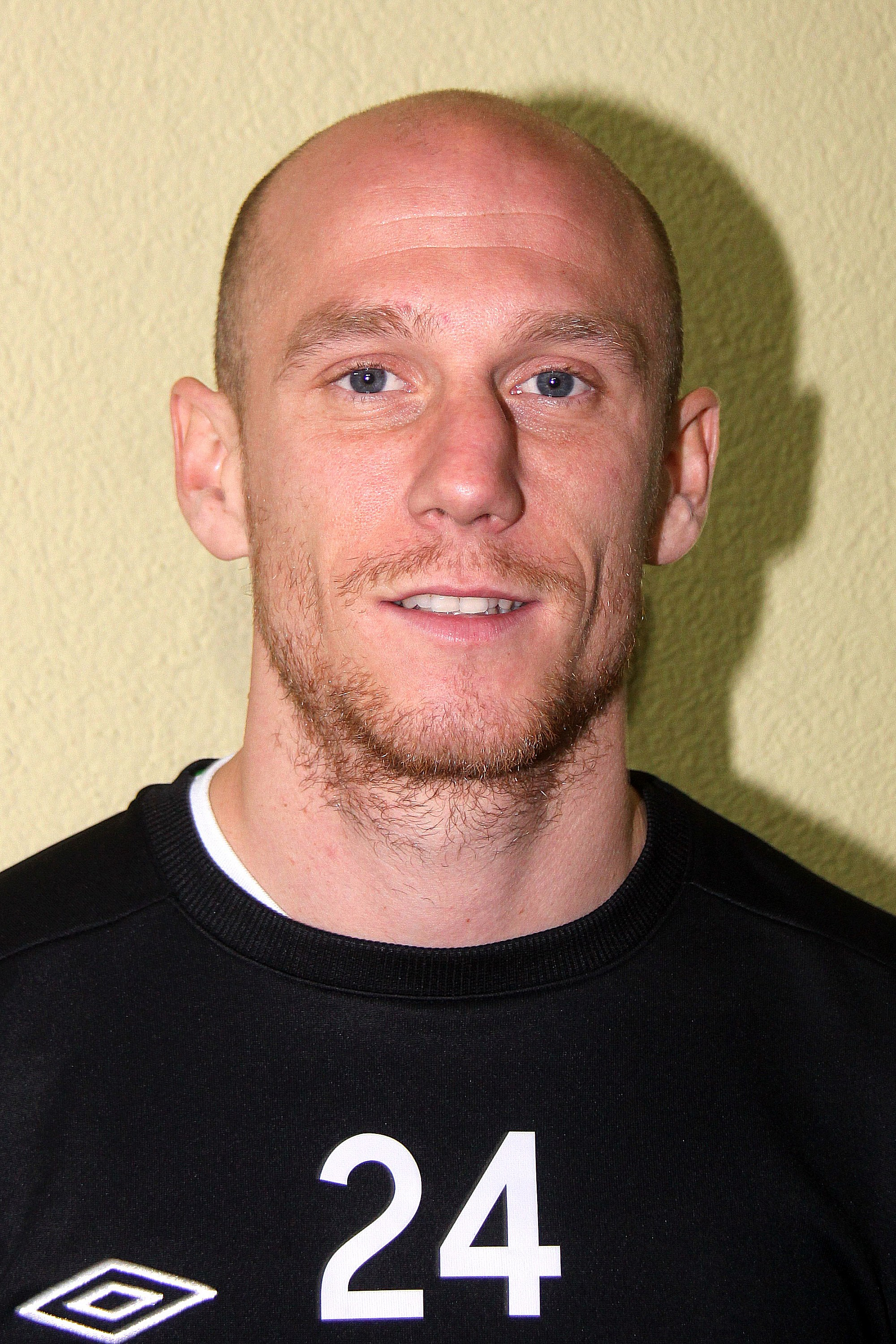

Personal information
- Date of birth: 1 July 1984 (age 42)
- Place of birth: Feldkirch, Austria
- Height: 1.78 m (5 ft 10 in)
- Position: Midfielder

Team information
- Current team: SC Röthis

Youth career
- 1992–1998: FC Götzis
- 1998: FC Lauterach
- 1998–2002: AKA Vorarlberg

Senior career*
Years	Team	Apps	(Gls)
2002–2003	Grasshoppers	0	(0)
2003–2005	Schwarz-Weiß Bregenz	49	(0)
2005–2007	ASKÖ Pasching	8	(0)
2006–2007	→ SC Rheindorf Altach (loan)	22	(0)
2007–2008	SC Rheindorf Altach	13	(0)
2008–2011	SC Austria Lustenau	64	(2)
2011–2013	FC Lustenau	58	(0)
2013–2017	SC Austria Lustenau	121	(1)
2017–	SC Röthis		

International career^{‡}
2003–2006	Austria U21	5	(0)
- * Club domestic league appearances and goals as of 12 May 2017 ‡ National team caps and goals as of 3 June 2016

Mario Bolter (born 1 July 1984) is an Austrian footballer who currently plays as a defensive midfielder for SC Röthis.
