= Cadinha =

Portuguese footballer (born 1984)

Personal information
- Full name: Ricardo Jorge Ferreira dos Santos
- Date of birth: 1 September 1984 (age 42)
- Place of birth: Matosinhos, Portugal
- Height: 1.71 m (5 ft 7 in)
- Position: Midfielder

Team information
- Current team: Pedrouços

Youth career
- 1994–2003: Leixões

Senior career*
Years	Team	Apps	(Gls)
2003–2008	Leixões	42	(2)
2005–2006	→ Ovarense (loan)	28	(3)
2008	→ Ribeirão (loan)	16	(1)
2008–2009	Gondomar	16	(1)
2009–2012	Boavista	72	(6)
2012–2013	Chaves	8	(1)
2013–2016	Leixões	103	(7)
2016–2017	Rio Tinto	12	(2)
2017	Pasteleira	3	(1)
2017–	Pedrouços	24	(2)

International career
2003	Portugal U19	2	(0)
- * Club domestic league appearances and goals as of 8 April 2018

Ricardo Jorge Ferreira dos Santos (born 1 September 1984), known as Cadinha, is a Portuguese professional footballer who plays for Pedrouços A.C. as a midfielder.

== Club career ==
Born in Matosinhos, Cadinha spent the better part of his career with hometown club Leixões SC, reaching the youth academy at the age of 10. After two loans, he was released on 30 June 2008 and went on to represent, alternating between the Segunda Liga and the third division, Gondomar SC, Boavista F.C. and G.D. Chaves.

Cadinha returned to Leixões in January 2013, with the side still in the second level.
