= Francesco Della Rocca =

Italian footballer

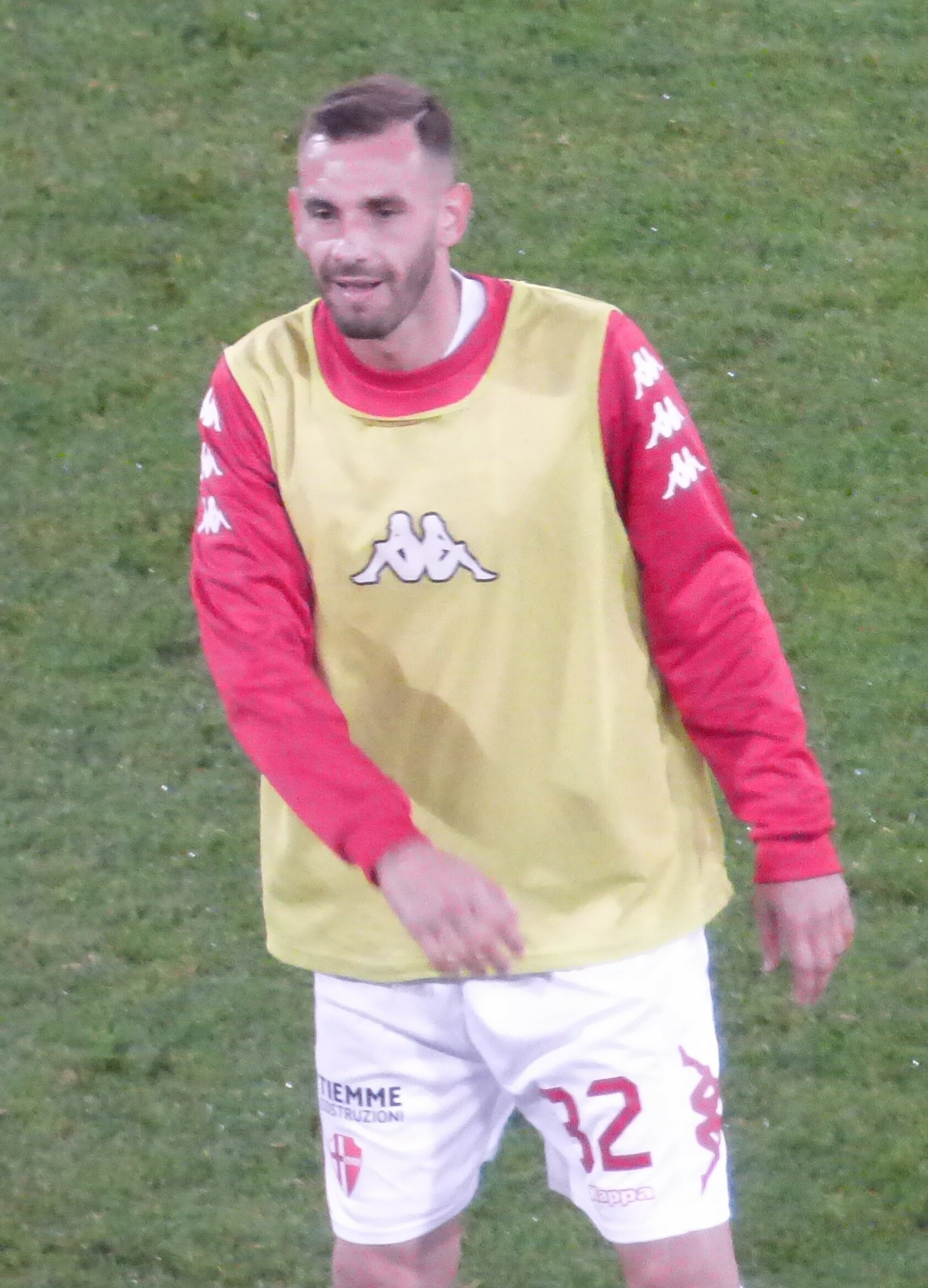
- Della Rocca in 2018

Personal information
- Date of birth: 14 September 1987 (age 39)
- Place of birth: Brindisi, Italy
- Height: 1.82 m (6 ft 0 in)
- Position: Central midfielder

Youth career
- 2003–2005: Bologna

Senior career*
| Years | Team | Apps | (Gls) |
| 2005–2011 | Bologna | 36 | (0) |
| 2006–2007 | → Sambenedettese (loan) | 16 | (0) |
| 2007–2008 | → Avellino (loan) | 12 | (0) |
| 2008–2009 | → Sassuolo (loan) | 7 | (0) |
| 2009–2010 | → Brescia (loan) | 3 | (0) |
| 2010 | → Perugia (loan) | 6 | (1) |
| 2011–2015 | Palermo | 26 | (0) |
| 2012–2013 | → Fiorentina (loan) | 0 | (0) |
| 2013 | → Siena (loan) | 17 | (0) |
| 2013–2014 | → Bologna (loan) | 9 | (0) |
| 2015–2016 | Perugia | 37 | (0) |
| 2016–2018 | Salernitana | 36 | (2) |
| 2018–2019 | Padova | 4 | (0) |
| Total | | 209 | (3) |

International career
| 2003 | Italy U16 | 2 | (0) |
| 2005–2006 | Italy U19 | 3 | (0) |
| 2008 | Italy U20 | 1 | (0) |
- * Club domestic league appearances and goals

Francesco Della Rocca (born 14 September 1987) is an Italian former footballer who played as a central midfielder.

== Club career ==
=== Bologna ===
A Bologna youth product, he spent the early years of his professional career on loan to minor league clubs before playing his first full Serie A season in 2010–11.

=== Palermo ===
On 23 August 2011, he signed a new five-year contract with Bologna, but left the club only a week later to join Palermo in a co-ownership bid, for €3.5 million.

In summer 2012, he joined ACF Fiorentina. However, he was injured in September 2012. On 12 January 2013, he moved on loan to Siena, and then spent the 2013–14 season on loan at his old club Bologna, playing only nine times.

He returned to Palermo after the end of his loan spell on 1 July 2014, and was called up for the Rosanero's first team pre-season camp. In summer 2014, Palermo also acquired the remain 50% registration rights of Della Rocca, for a peppercorn fee of €500.

On 30 August 2015, the contract of Palermo and Della Rocca was canceled in mutual consent.

=== Perugia ===
On 30 August 2015, Della Rocca was signed by Perugia.

=== Salernitana ===
On 31 August 2016, he joined Salernitana in a two-year deal.

=== Padova ===
On 9 July 2018, he joined Serie B club Padova, signing a one-year contract with an additional one-year extension option. His contract was dissolved by mutual consent on 31 January 2019.

== Personal life ==
He is the younger brother of Luigi Della Rocca.
