= Luigi Della Rocca =

Italian footballer

Personal information
- Full name: Luigi Andrea Della Rocca
- Date of birth: 2 September 1984 (age 42)
- Place of birth: Brindisi, Italy
- Height: 1.85 m (6 ft 1 in)
- Position: Forward

Youth career
- Bologna

Senior career*
| Years | Team | Apps | (Gls) |
| 2001–2007 | Bologna | 60 | (9) |
| 2003–2004 | → Catania (loan) | 12 | (0) |
| 2004 | → Atalanta (loan) | 5 | (0) |
| 2004–2005 | → Pisa (loan) | 12 | (2) |
| 2007–2011 | Triestina | 69 | (17) |
| 2011–2013 | Portogruaro | 39 | (11) |
| 2013–2014 | Carpi | 21 | (6) |
| 2014 | Cremonese | 14 | (4) |
| 2014–2016 | Lecce | 21 | (1) |
| 2015 | → Novara (loan) | 11 | (1) |
| 2015–2016 | → Rimini (loan) | 12 | (0) |
| 2017–2021 | AS Sasso Marconi | 93 | (13) |

International career
| 2001 | Italy U-17 | 7 | (5) |
| 2002 | Italy U-18 | 6 | (4) |
| 2002–2003 | Italy U-19 | 11 | (3) |
| 2003–2004 | Italy U-20 | 4 | (0) |
- * Club domestic league appearances and goals

Luigi Andrea Della Rocca (born 2 September 1984) is an Italian former footballer who played as a forward.

== Club career ==
=== Triestina ===
Della Rocca was signed by Triestina in January 2007 in a co-ownership deal for €350,000. In June 2009 Della Rocca was signed by Triestina outright for another €150,000.

=== Lega Pro clubs ===
Della Rocca signed a 3-year contract with Lega Pro Prima Divisione club Portogruaro in mid-2011. He left for Carpi on 31 January 2013.

In January 2014 Della Rocca was signed by Cremonese.

On 11 July 2014 Della Rocca was signed by U.S. Lecce. On 2 February 2015 Della Rocca was signed by Novara in a temporary deal, with Jacopo Manconi and Gustavo Vagenin moved to opposite direction. They finished as the first in Group A of 2014–15 Lega Pro season.

On 22 August 2015 Della Rocca was signed by Rimini in a temporary deal. In January 2016 an injury put an end to his season.

On 31 August 2016 he parted ways with Lecce as his contract was terminated in a mutual consent.

== International career ==
He won the 2003 UEFA European Under-19 Championship with the Italian U-19 team. He participated in 2001 UEFA European Under-16 Championship, which was renamed to under-17 Championship after 2001 edition.

== Personal life ==
He is the elder brother of Francesco Della Rocca.

== Honours ==
- Lega Pro: 2015 (Novara)
