= Michele Murolo =

Italian footballer (born 1983)

Personal information
- Date of birth: 27 November 1983 (age 42)
- Place of birth: Naples, Italy
- Height: 1.87 m (6 ft 2 in)
- Position: Centre back

Team information
- Current team: Pomigliano (sporting director)

Senior career*
| Years | Team | Apps | (Gls) |
| 2002–2010 | Marcianise | 194 | (6) |
| 2010–2011 | Salernitana | 18 | (1) |
| 2011–2012 | Spezia | 21 | (1) |
| 2012–2014 | Juve Stabia | 37 | (2) |
| 2014 | Vicenza | 7 | (0) |
| 2014–2016 | Casertana | 48 | (6) |
| 2017–2021 | Carrarese | 60 | (5) |
| 2021–2022 | Paganese | 22 | (2) |
| 2022–2023 | Afragolese | 17 | (1) |
| Total | | 424 | (24) |
- * Club domestic league appearances and goals

Michele Murolo (born 27 November 1983) is an Italian former footballer who is currently as a sporting director for Pomigliano.

== Biography ==
Born in Naples, Campania, Murolo started his career at Campania club Marcianise. The club promoted from Serie D (fifth division until 2014) to Serie C2 in 2005 (fourth division until 2014) and again from Serie C2 to Lega Pro Prima Divisione (ex–Serie C1). The club was excluded from 2010–11 season due to financial difficulties. Murolo left for another Campania club Salernitana in 2010, however the club also bankrupted at the end of season.

In 2011, he was signed by Ligurian club Spezia. He won promotion again, this time from the third division to Serie B. However, on 10 August 2012 he was released. Murolo immediately returned to Campania for fellow Serie B club Juve Stabia.

On 13 January 2014 he was signed by the third division club Vicenza in 1 1/2-year contract, with Angelo Di Stasio moved to opposite direction. 25 July 2014 he was signed by Casertana for free. In 2017, he was signed by Carrarese after a short trial period.

On 31 July 2021 he joined Paganese on a one-season deal.

== Executive career ==
On 31 July 2023, Murolo was appointed sporting director at Nola until 9 September 2024.

He left Nola and was appointed sporting director at Pomigliano on 26 June 2026 until now.
