= Branimir Poljac =

Norwegian footballer (born 1984)

Personal information
- Full name: Branimir Poljac
- Date of birth: 17 May 1984 (age 42)
- Place of birth: Oslo, Norway
- Height: 1.83 m (6 ft 0 in)
- Positions: Striker; winger

Youth career
- Klemetsrud
- KFUM Oslo
- Stabæk

Senior career*
Years	Team	Apps	(Gls)
2002–2007	Stabæk	42	(11)
2004	→ Start (loan)	1	(0)
2008	Moss	20	(3)
2009–2010	Konyaspor	40	(11)

International career^{‡}
2000	Norway U16	4	(1)
2002	Norway U18	9	(4)
2003	Norway U19	9	(1)
2001–2004	Norway U21	6	(0)
- * Club domestic league appearances and goals as of 24 May 2010 ‡ National team caps and goals as of 21 January 2009

Branimir Poljac (born 17 May 1984) is a former Norwegian football striker who was playing for Konyaspor in Turkey before he had a car accident which ended his career. He has Croatian parents.

== Career ==
Poljac started his career in Klemetsrud and KFUM Oslo and then as a junior player he signed for Stabæk. He played for Stabæk in the Norwegian Tippeliga, but limited playing time saw him moving to Moss ahead of the 2008 season. In January 2009, Poljac signed with the Turkish club Konyaspor.

On 2 April 2010, Poljac was seriously injured in a car accident. Poljac lost control of his car in a curve, and went off the road, landing on its roof. According to news reports, Poljac suffered serious neck injuries in the crash, and might be permananently paralyzed. On the 6 April, it was first reported that he was still in a serious condition and could potentially die and that the risk for him, becoming paralyzed was as high as 90%.

Later the same day, doctors said, that he would survive the accident, whereas Branimir Poljac stated:

I survived a huge accident. For now I feel lucky I am live. I want to get well as soon as possible and return to football. From the accident until today, I want to thank everyone who has supported me. Everyone who loves me, keep on praying for me.

In order to give him moral support, a website has been created for his honour, called "Legend Poljac" where people wrote messages to him.

Poljac is currently in Norway in Sunnaas Hospital and fighting back after his accident. He is slowly regaining use of his limbs. At first he could only move his shoulders, but now he is beginning to feel his arms, and his situation has moved very fast forward. In an interview he stated that he will be back somehow, as fit as before the accident.

== Konyaspor's involvement with Poljac after the accident ==
Konyaspor is constantly in touch with Poljac. The team bus now displays the pictures of Poljac, and the Turkish Football Federation has reimbursed the player with 100,000 Turkish liras for the accident.
