= Petr Mikolanda =

Czech footballer and manager

Personal information
- Date of birth: 12 September 1984 (age 42)
- Place of birth: Prague, Czechoslovakia
- Height: 1.93 m (6 ft 4 in)
- Position: Striker

Team information
- Current team: Benešov (Manager)

Youth career
- 1989–1991: Sokol Nebušice
- 1991–2002: Motorlet Prague
- 2002–2003: → Slavia Prague

Senior career*
Years	Team	Apps	(Gls)
2003–2005	Viktoria Žižkov	39	(13)
2005–2006	West Ham United	0	(0)
2005	→ Northampton Town (loan)	2	(0)
2005–2006	→ Swindon Town (loan)	5	(0)
2006	→ Rushden and Diamonds (loan)	9	(1)
2006–2007	Mladá Boleslav	7	(0)
2010	Viktoria Žižkov		
2011–2013	Zápy		
2014	Ostrá		
2014–2015	Lhota		
2016	Admira Prague		
2016–2017	Sokol Semice		
2018	Sokol Nespeky		

International career
2003	Czech Republic U-19	7	(5)
2003	Czech Republic U-20	2	(0)
2004–2006	Czech Republic U-21	14	(2)

Managerial career
- Viktoria Žižkov (youth)
- –2016: Admira Prague (youth)
- 2016–2018: Slavia Prague (youth)
- 2016–2019: Czech Republic U-21 (assistant)
- 2018: Viktoria Žižkov
- 2018–2019: Táborsko
- 2019–2020: Al Raed (youth)
- 2020–2022: Horky nad Jizerou
- 2022–2023: Meteor Prague U-19
- 2023–: Benešov
- * Club domestic league appearances and goals

Petr Mikolanda (born 12 September 1984) is a former football player and current manager of SK Benešov.

== Career ==
Mikolanda scored his first competitive goal for Žižkov on 14 August 2003 in the 3–0 UEFA Cup victory over Zhenis Astana. He subsequently joined West Ham in July 2005 having scored 13 goals in the Czech second division in the 2004–05 season for Viktoria Žižkov. He joined Football League Two side Northampton Town on loan in September 2005, where he made three league and cup appearances. His loan spell at Northampton was cut short by injury but after recovering, he joined Swindon Town on loan in November 2005, for whom he made one start and four substitute appearances. He then joined Rushden and Diamonds on loan for the rest of the season in January 2006, and made nine appearances for Rushden, scoring a goal against Notts County with a half-volley from 30 yards. Mikolanda was released by West Ham manager Alan Pardew in May 2006, and joined FK Mladá Boleslav on a free transfer.

In 2007, he was diagnosed with inflammation of the kidney and was forced to stop his career. He then coached the youth team at Viktoria Žižkov whilst waiting for a kidney transplantation.

In July 2010, Mikolanda announced his comeback to professional football after three years of surgery, signing a new contract with FK Viktoria Žižkov. "The doctors stated that I'll be able to play again. I was waiting for this moment for three years and I never gave up, although many people thought that I had no chance. Now I'm ready and I can't wait to play again," he said.

=== Coaching and later career ===
Right after he stopped his career, Mikolanda was hired as a youth coach at Viktoria Žižkov. In July 2010, Mikolanda announced his comeback to professional football after three years of surgery, signing a new contract with FK Viktoria Žižkov. "The doctors stated that I'll be able to play again. I was waiting for this moment for three years and I never gave up, although many people thought that I had no chance. Now I'm ready and I can't wait to play again," he said. He then worked as a youth coach at Admira Prague and later became part of the club's first team as a player alongside his coaching duties.

Between 2011 and 2013, Mikolanda played for SK Zápy. In 2014, he played for Ostrá. Later in 2014, he moved to SK Lhota. In 2016, he played for Admira Prague and later also at AFK Sokol Semice. In the summer of 2016 he also became youth coach at Slavia Prague. He was also part of the technical staff of the Czech U-21 national team until 2019.

Ahead of the 2018–19 season, Mikolanda was appointed manager of his former club, Viktoria Žižkov. On 30 October 2018, after less than four months, Mikolanda was fired. Žižkov was at the bottom of the table at this point with only 10 points after 13 rounds of play.

On 20 December 2018 he was appointed manager of FC MAS Táborsko. On 28 April 2019 Mikolanda was sacked with 5 matches left in the season because the team was in the relegation zone. In August 2019, Mikolanda became an academy coach at Saudi Arabian club Al Raed FC, where he was for a year.

Ahead of the 2020–21 season, Mikolanda became manager of Horky nad Jizerou. He was fired in April 2022. In the 2022–23 season, Mikolanda was coaching the U-19 squad of Meteor Prague.

On 30 August 2023, Mikolanda was appointed manager of SK Benešov.
