= Olav Tuelo Johannesen =

Norwegian footballer (born 1984)

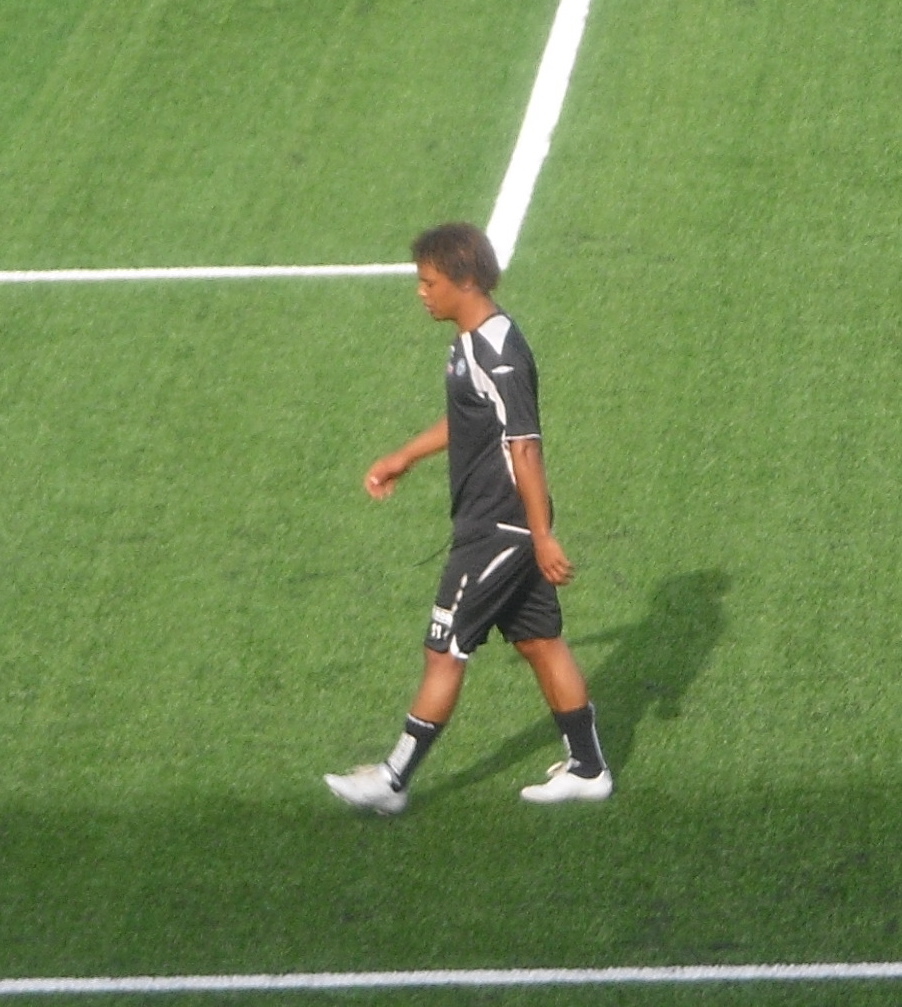

Personal information
- Date of birth: 23 February 1984 (age 42)
- Place of birth: Larvik, Norway
- Height: 1.79 m (5 ft 10 1/2 in)
- Positions: Attacking midfielder; striker

Youth career
- Larvik Turn

Senior career*
| Years | Team | Apps | (Gls) |
| 2002–2003 | Larvik Turn | | |
| 2003–2007 | Sandefjord | 71 | (9) |
| 2005–2006 | → Bodø/Glimt (loan) | 14 | (2) |
| 2006–2007 | → HamKam (loan) | 6 | (1) |
| 2008–2013 | Kongsvinger | 138 | (39) |
| 2011 | → Start (loan) | 10 | (1) |

International career
| 2003 | Norway U19 | 1 | (1) |
- * Club domestic league appearances and goals as of 19 April 2014

Olav Tuelo Johannesen (born 23 February 1984) is a Norwegian footballer who plays as a forward. He also holds citizenship of Botswana. He was born to a Motswana mother and a Norwegian father.

== Club career ==
Tuelo Johannesen started his career at Larvik Turn as a youth player.

In 2003, he made a transfer to Sandefjord, and he made his Tippeligaen debut in the scoreless draw against Stabæk on 9 April 2006.

During his period in Sandefjord, he was loaned out to Bodø/Glimt (2005–2006) and HamKam (2006–2007).

In 2007 Olav made a transfer to Kongsvinger. He played 105 matches for the club.

On 1 August 2011 he was signed by IK Start until the end of the season.

== Career statistics ==
As of 30 December 2013

| Season | Club | Division | League | | Cup | | Total | |
| Season | Club | Division | Apps | Goals | Apps | Goals | Apps | Goals |
|---|---|---|---|---|---|---|---|---|
| 2003 | Sandefjord | Adeccoligaen | 21 | 4 | 1 | 0 | 22 | 4 |
| 2004 | Sandefjord | Adeccoligaen | 18 | 3 | 5 | 3 | 23 | 6 |
| 2005 | Sandefjord | Adeccoligaen | 16 | 2 | 0 | 0 | 16 | 2 |
| 2006 | Sandefjord | Tippeligaen | 10 | 0 | 1 | 1 | 11 | 1 |
| 2006 | Bodø/Glimt | Adeccoligaen | 14 | 2 | 5 | 3 | 19 | 5 |
| 2007 | Sandefjord | Tippeligaen | 6 | 0 | 1 | 0 | 7 | 0 |
| 2007 | HamKam | Adeccoligaen | 6 | 1 | 0 | 0 | 6 | 1 |
| 2008 | Kongsvinger | Adeccoligaen | 21 | 4 | 0 | 0 | 21 | 4 |
| 2009 | Kongsvinger | Adeccoligaen | 24 | 3 | 1 | 0 | 25 | 3 |
| 2010 | Kongsvinger | Tippeligaen | 26 | 6 | 4 | 0 | 30 | 6 |
| 2011 | Kongsvinger | Adeccoligaen | 15 | 8 | 3 | 5 | 18 | 13 |
| 2011 | Start | Tippeligaen | 10 | 1 | 2 | 0 | 12 | 1 |
| 2012 | Kongsvinger | Adeccoligaen | 26 | 12 | 3 | 0 | 29 | 12 |
| 2013 | Kongsvinger | Adeccoligaen | 26 | 6 | 1 | 2 | 27 | 8 |
| Career Total | | | 239 | 52 | 27 | 14 | 266 | 66 |
