= Lukas Mössner =

Austrian footballer

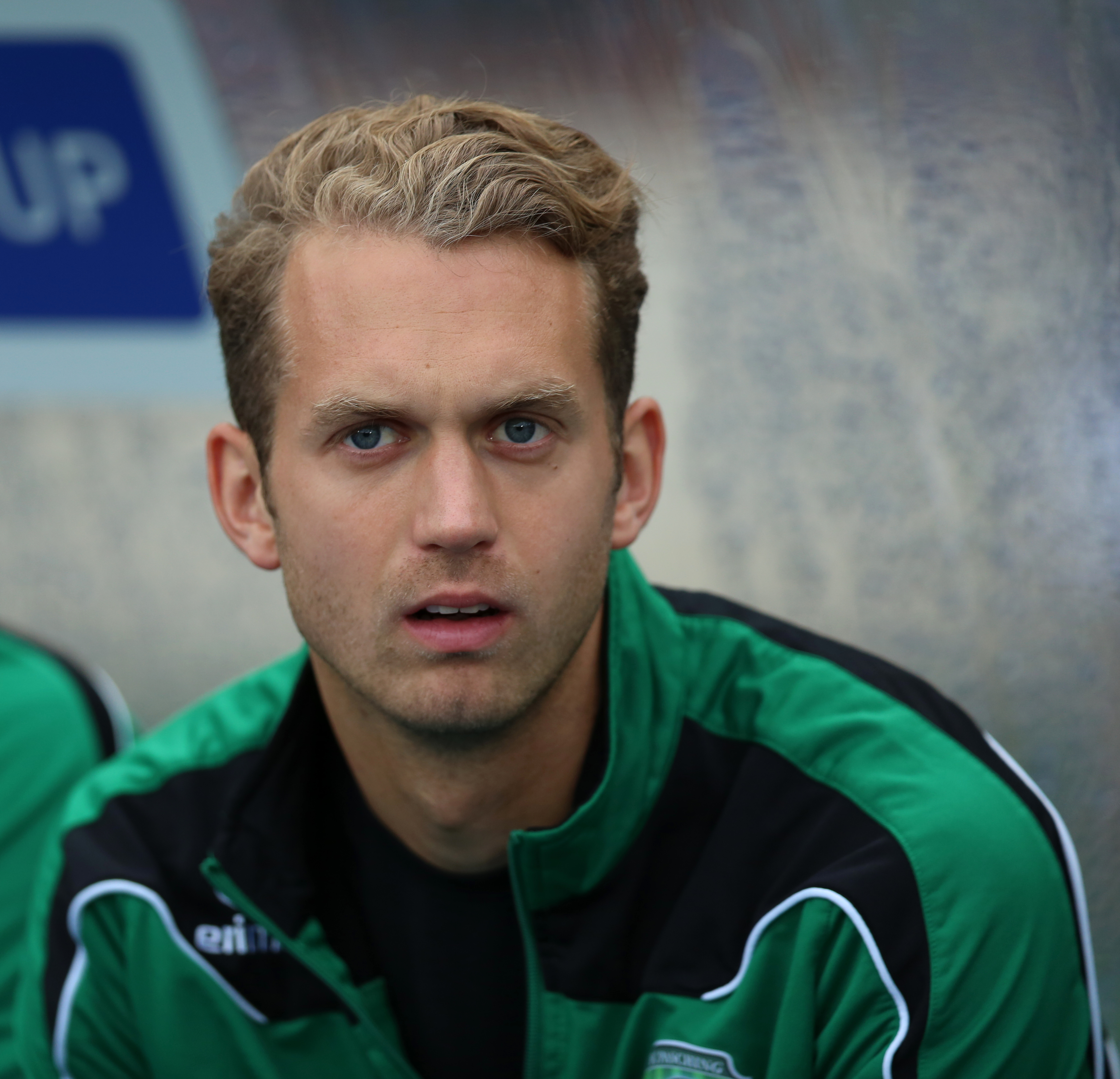

Personal information
- Full name: Lukas Mössner
- Date of birth: 14 March 1984 (age 42)
- Place of birth: Sankt Pölten, Austria
- Height: 1.88 m (6 ft 2 in)
- Position: Forward

Youth career
- 1992–1994: SKVg Pottenbrunn
- 1994–2002: VSE St. Pölten
- 2002–2003: SC Freiburg

Senior career*
Years	Team	Apps	(Gls)
2002–2004	SC Freiburg II	55	(13)
2005–2006	SV Mattersburg	22	(3)
2005–2007	FC Pasching	0	(0)
2006–2007	→ SC Schwanenstadt (loan)	28	(22)
2007–2008	Austria Kärnten	27	(2)
2008–2009	Austria Wien	4	(0)
2009–2010	St. Pölten	29	(5)
2010–2011	Eintracht Trier	28	(11)
2011–2012	TSV Hartberg	35	(10)
2012–2014	FC Pasching	48	(16)
2014–2016	Floridsdorfer AC	55	(10)
2016–2017	ASV Draßburg		
2017–2018	St. Georgen/Eisenstadt	39	(29)
2018–2020	SV Wimpassing	37	(12)

International career
2003–2007	Austria U-21	14	(3)

Managerial career
- 2014–2015: Floridsdorfer AC (U9 assistant)
- 2016–2017: SV Wimpassing (U12 assistant)
- 2017–2018: St. Georgen/Eisenstadt (assistant)
- 2017–2018: St. Georgen/Eisenstadt II
- 2018–2020: SV Wimpassing II (individual coach)
- 2018–2020: SV Wimpassing (U10 manager)
- * Club domestic league appearances and goals

Lukas Mössner (born 14 March 1984 in Sankt Pölten) is an Austrian footballer currently playing for ASV Draßburg. He has also made 14 appearances for the Austria U-21 team, scoring three goals.

== Honours ==
Pasching

- Austrian Cup: 2012–13
