= Paul Gludovatz =

Austrian football manager (1946–2021)

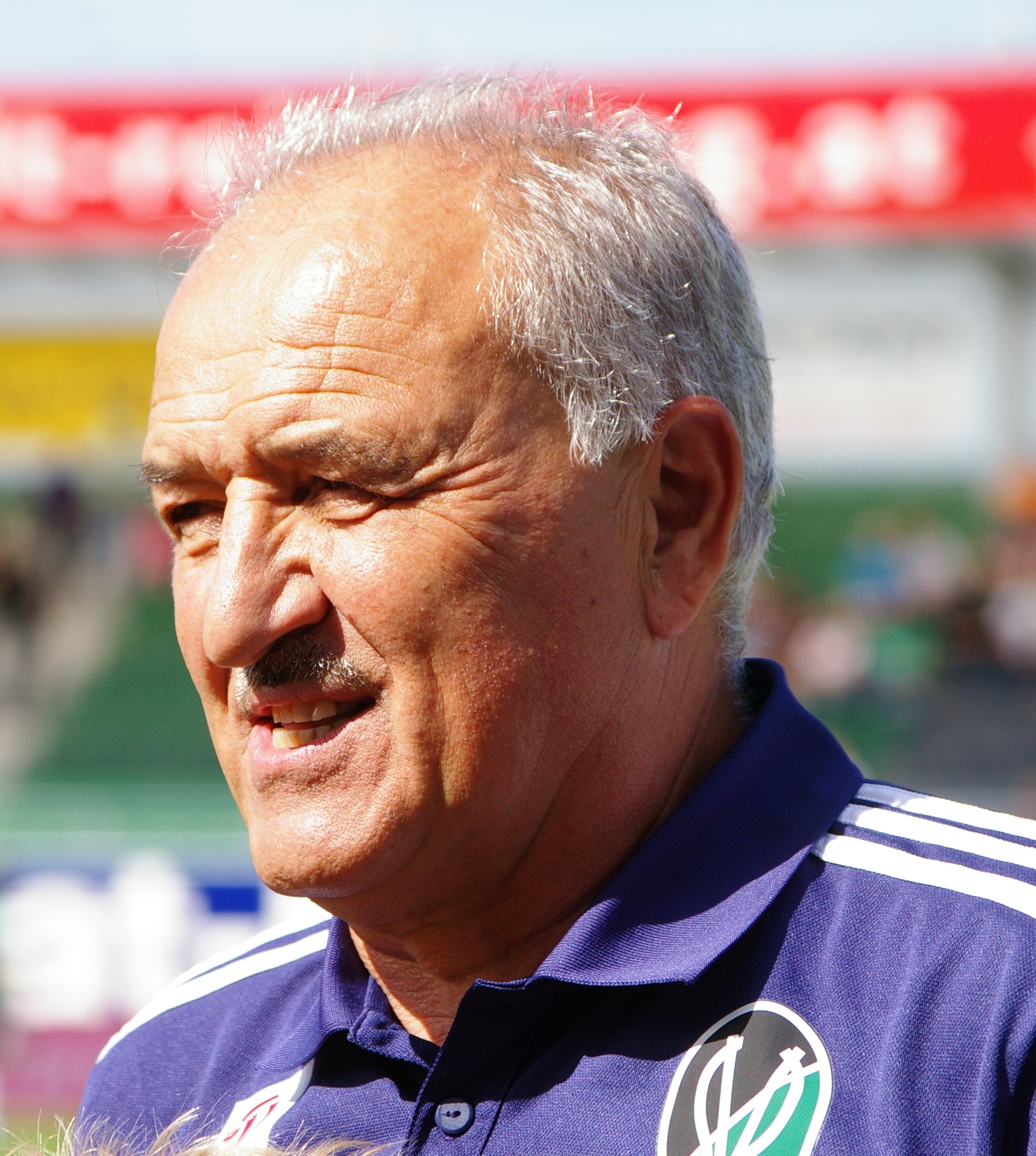

Personal information
- Date of birth: 10 June 1946
- Place of birth: Eberau, Austria
- Date of death: 12 November 2021 (aged 75)

Managerial career
- Years: Team
- –2006: Austria U-19
- 2006–2008: Austria U-20
- 2008-2012: SV Ried
- 2012–2013: TSV Hartberg
- 2013–2015: SV Eberau
- 2015–2016: SV Ried

Paul Gludovatz (10 June 1946 – 12 November 2021) was an Austrian football manager.

== Career ==
He managed Austrian national youth football teams in different age brackets from 1981 to 2008.

== Death ==
Gludovatz died from complications of COVID-19 on 12 November 2021, amid the COVID-19 pandemic in Austria. He was 75.
