= Lukáš Nachtman =

Czech footballer

Personal information
- Date of birth: 11 May 1984 (age 42)
- Place of birth: Prague, Czechoslovakia
- Height: 1.94 m (6 ft 4 in)
- Position: Left-back

Youth career
- 1989–1997: Tempo Prague
- 1997–1998: Junior Praha
- 1998–2002: Slavia Prague

Senior career*
Years	Team	Apps	(Gls)
2003–2007	Slavia Prague B	73	(12)
2005–2007	Slavia Prague	1	(0)
2005–2006	Chmel Blšany (loan)	14	(1)
2008	Rimavská Sobota	5	(0)
2008–2011	Slovan Bratislava		
2009	Artmedia Petržalka (loan)		
2011–2012	Moravany nad Váhom		
2012–2013	Neded		
2013	Blava Jaslovské Bohunice		

International career
2000–2001	Czech Republic U17	5	(0)
2002	Czech Republic U19	4	(0)
2003	Czech Republic U20	3	(0)
- * Club domestic league appearances and goals

Lukáš Nachtman (born 11 May 1984) is a Czech former footballer.

== Career ==
Nachtman began his career with Tempo Prague and joined Junior Praha in 1997, where he played for one year, signing for Slavia Prague in 1998. He played for the reserve team of Slavia before making his début for the senior side on 2 August 2003 against Chmel Blšany. In 2004 Nachtman joined Blšany on loan. Nachtman subsequently returned to Slavia before signing for Slovak side Rimavská Sobota on 28 February 2008. He left the club after six months and signed for Slovan Bratislava on 16 June 2008 and later signed a loan deal with Artmedia Petržalka in February 2009.

== International ==
Nachtman played for his homeland Czech Republic at under-17 level, later also playing for the under-19s and under-20s.
