= Carlos Fonseca (footballer, born 1985) =

Portuguese footballer

Personal information
- Full name: Carlos Miguel Correia Fonseca
- Date of birth: 5 January 1985 (age 41)
- Place of birth: Senhora da Hora, Portugal
- Height: 1.80 m (5 ft 11 in)
- Position: Goalkeeper

Youth career
- 1992–1994: Porto
- 1996–2004: Leixões

Senior career*
Years	Team	Apps	(Gls)
2004–2012	Leixões	32	(0)
2004–2005	→ Padroense (loan)		
2007–2008	→ Moreirense (loan)	2	(0)
2012–2013	Vitória Setúbal	0	(0)
2013–2014	Salgueiros 08	28	(0)
2015–2017	Salgueiros	23	(0)
Total		85	(0)
- * Club domestic league appearances and goals

Carlos Miguel Correia Fonseca (born 5 January 1985 in Senhora da Hora, Matosinhos) is a Portuguese former professional footballer who played as a goalkeeper.
