= 2010–11 ACF Fiorentina season =

Fiorentina
2010–11 season
- President: Mario Cognigni
- Manager: Siniša Mihajlović
- Stadium: Stadio Artemio Franchi
- Serie A: 9th
- Coppa Italia: Round of 16
- Top goalscorer: League: Alberto Gilardino (12); All: Alberto Gilardino (12)
- Highest home attendance: 34,483 vs Juventus (17 April 2011, Serie A)
- Lowest home attendance: 4,904 vs Reggina (30 November 2010, Coppa Italia)
- Average home league attendance: 23,608
Home colours	Away colours	Third colours

The 2010–11 season was ACF Fiorentina's 85th season in Italian football and their 73rd season in the first-tier, Serie A. This was also the sixth consecutive season for the club in the top-level division of the Italian football league system.

After five seasons at the helm of the Tuscan club, Cesare Prandelli was succeeded by Siniša Mihajlović, with the former taking the role as head coach of the Italy national team. For Fiorentina, this was also the first season from the last three that Fiorentina did not compete in a European competition, after finishing 11th the previous season.

== Players ==
=== Squad information ===
Last updated on 22 May 2011
Appearances include league matches only

No.	Name	Nat	Position(s)	Date of birth (Age at end of season)	Signed from	Signed in	Apps.	Goals
Goalkeepers
1	Sébastien Frey	(France)	GK	18 March 1980 (aged 31)	(Italy) Parma	2005	175	0
33	Andrea Seculin	(Italy)	GK	14 July 1990 (aged 20)	(Italy) Südtirol	2008	0	0
35	Vlada Avramov	(Serbia)	GK	5 April 1979 (aged 32)	(Italy) Treviso	2008	5	0
41	Luca Lezzerini	(Italy)	GK	24 March 1995 (aged 16)	(Italy) Youth Sector	2011	0	0
84	Artur Boruc	(Poland)	GK	20 February 1980 (aged 31)	(Scotland) Celtic	2010	26	0
89	Neto	(Brazil)	GK	19 July 1989 (aged 21)	(Brazil) Atlético Paranaense	2011	0	0
Defenders
2	Per Krøldrup	(Denmark)	CB	31 July 1979 (aged 31)	(England) Everton	2006	117	3
5	Alessandro Gamberini	(Italy)	CB	27 August 1981 (aged 29)	(Italy) Bologna	2005	165	5
14	Cesare Natali	(Italy)	CB	5 April 1979 (aged 32)	(Italy) Torino	2009	37	0
23	Manuel Pasqual (Captain)	(Italy)	LB / LM	13 March 1982 (aged 30)	(Italy) Arezzo	2005	172	3
25	Gianluca Comotto	(Italy)	CB / RB / RM	16 October 1978 (aged 32)	(Italy) Torino	2008	74	0
29	Lorenzo De Silvestri	(Italy)	RB	23 May 1988 (aged 23)	(Italy) Lazio	2009	52	2
30	Nikola Gulan	(Serbia)	LB / DM / LM	23 March 1989 (aged 22)	(Serbia) Partizan	2008	6	0
31	Michele Camporese	(Italy)	CB	19 May 1992 (aged 19)	(Italy) Youth Sector	2011	9	1
40	Cristiano Piccini	(Italy)	RB / RM	26 September 1992 (aged 18)	(Italy) Youth Sector	2010	1	0
Midfielders
4	Marco Donadel	(Italy)	DM / CM	21 April 1983 (aged 28)	(Italy) Milan	2005	184	4
6	Juan Manuel Vargas	(Peru)	LW / LB / LM	5 October 1983 (aged 27)	(Italy) Catania	2008	80	12
7	Mario Santana	(Argentina)	RW / LW / AM	23 December 1981 (aged 29)	(Italy) Palermo	2006	108	15
17	Amidu Salifu	(Ghana)	CM	20 September 1992 (aged 18)	(Italy) Vicenza	2011	1	0
18	Riccardo Montolivo	(Italy)	DM / CM	18 January 1985 (aged 26)	(Italy) Atalanta	2005	189	13

== Transfers ==
=== In ===
No.	Pos.	Nat.	Name	Age	EU	Moving from	Type	Transfer window	Ends	Transfer fee	Source
	DF	(Brazil)	Felipe	25	EU	Udinese	Transfer	Summer		Undisclosed	
89	MF	(Italy)	Gaetano D'Agostino	28	EU	Udinese	Co-ownership	Summer	2013	€4.5M	udinese.it
	GK	(Italy)	Pierluigi Gollini	15	EU	SPAL	Transfer	Summer		Undisclosed	firenzeviola.it
	MF	(Italy)	Michel Panatti	16	EU	Monza	Loan	Summer	2011	N/A	firenzeviola.it
84	GK	(Poland)	Artur Boruc	30	EU	Celtic (Scotland)	Transfer	Summer	2013	€1.2M	violachannel.tv
	FW	(Italy)	Simone D'Anna	20	EU	Virtus Casarano	Transfer	Summer		Undisclosed	firenzeviola.it
24	MF	(Italy)	Alessio Cerci	23	EU	Roma	Transfer	Summer	2015	€4M	violachannel.tv
	GK	(Italy)	Isaia Bertolacci	14	EU	Lucchese	Transfer	Summer		Undisclosed	calciomercato.com
89	GK	(Brazil)	Neto	21	Non-EU	Atlético Paranaense (Brazil)	Transfer	Winter	2016	€3M	violachannel.tv
	DF	(Italy)	Giacomo Lepri	20	Non-EU	Paganese	Transfer	Winter		Undisclosed	firenzeviola.it
85	MF	(Switzerland)	Valon Behrami	25	EU	West Ham United (England)	Transfer	Winter	2014	€2M	violachannel.tv
	MF	(Ghana)	Amidu Salifu	18	Non-EU	Vicenza	Co-ownership	Winter	2014	€2.4M	violachannel.tv

Total spending: ▼ ~€17.1 million

=== Out ===
No.	Pos.	Nat.	Name	Age	EU	Moving to	Type	Transfer window	Transfer fee	Source
15	DF	(Czech Republic)	Ondřej Mazuch	21	EU	Anderlecht (Belgium)	Transfer	Summer	€1.3M	rsca.be
	MF	(Uganda)	Savio Nsereko	20	EU	1860 Munich (Germany)	Loan	Summer		violachannel.tv
	DF	(Italy)	Ramzi Aya	19	EU	Reggiana	Co-ownership	Summer		violachannel.tv
	DF	(Italy)	Samuele Bettoni	20	EU	Reggiana	Co-ownership	Summer		violachannel.tv
	FW	(Italy)	Lorenzo Morelli	22	EU	Juve Stabia	Co-ownership	Summer	Undisclosed	violachannel.tv
	FW	(Brazil)	Jefferson	22	EU	Eupen (Belgium)	Loan	Summer		violachannel.tv
	MF	(Senegal)	Pape Moussa Diakhatè	21	Non-EU	Eupen (Belgium)	Transfer	Summer	Undisclosed	
19	DF	(Italy)	Massimo Gobbi	29	EU	Parma	End of contract	Summer		violachannel.tv
	MF	(Italy)	Andrea Paolucci	23	EU	Andria BAT	Transfer	Summer	Undisclosed	violachannel.tv
	MF	(Italy)	Lorenzo Tafi	19	EU	Prato	Transfer	Summer	Undisclosed	violachannel.tv
	FW	(Italy)	Lorenzo Morelli	22	EU	Gavorrano	Co-ownership	Summer	Undisclosed	violachannel.tv
	MF	(Italy)	Giacomo Lepri	19	EU	Paganese	Co-ownership	Summer	Undisclosed	violachannel.tv
	MF	(Italy)	Massimiliano Tagliani	21	EU	Ravenna	Co-ownership	Summer	Undisclosed	violachannel.tv
	FW	(Italy)	Samuel Di Carmine	21	EU	Frosinone	Co-ownership	Summer	Undisclosed	violachannel.tv
	FW	(Italy)	Piergiuseppe Maritato	21	EU	Reggiana	Loan	Summer		violachannel.tv
	MF	(Italy)	Francesco Di Tacchio	20	EU	Frosinone	Loan	Summer		violachannel.tv
	MF	(Italy)	Francesco Di Tacchio	20	EU	Frosinone	Co-ownership	Summer	Undisclosed	violachannel.tv
	MF	(Italy)	Giacomo Lepri	20	EU	San Marino	Co-ownership	Winter	Undisclosed	sanmarinocalcio.com
15	MF	(Italy)	Cristiano Zanetti	33	EU	Brescia	Transfer	Winter	Undisclosed	violachannel.tv
28	MF	(Argentina)	Mario Bolatti	25	EU	Internacional (Brazil)	Transfer	Winter	Undisclosed	violachannel.tv
20	MF	(Senegal)	Papa Waigo	26	EU	Grosseto	Loan	Winter		violachannel.tv
	MF	(Uganda)	Savio Nsereko	21	EU	Chernomorets Burgas (Bulgaria)	Loan	Winter		violachannel.tv
	DF	(Italy)	Felipe dal Belo	26	EU	Cesena	Loan	Winter		violachannel.tv

Total income: ▲ ~€1.3 million

== Pre-season and friendlies ==
18 July 2010 Friendly	Calcio Cortina	0–6	Fiorentina	Cortina d'Ampezzo, Italy
17:30 CEST (UTC+02:00)		Report	Ljajić 30'; Jovetić 50', 83', 87'; Agyei 78'; Seferovic 85'	Attendance: 600

22 July 2010 Friendly	Vazzolese	0–9	Fiorentina	Cortina d'Ampezzo, Italy
17:30 CEST (UTC+02:00)		Report	Di Carmine 2', 10', 12', 58'; Ljajić 8', 26', 32'; Vargas 37', 39'	Attendance: 700

25 July 2010 Friendly	Montebelluna	0–8	Fiorentina	Cortina d'Ampezzo, Italy
17:30 CEST (UTC+02:00)		Report	Di Carmine 4', 44'; Ljajić 20', 29'; Seferovic 55', 90'; Jovetić 64' (pen.); Capuano 82' (o.g.)

7 August 2010 Friendly	Tottenham Hotspur	3–2	Fiorentina	London, England
16:00 CEST (UTC+02:00)	Pavlyuchenko 29'; Keane 56', 88'	Report	Gilardino 7'; Ljajić 35'	Stadium: White Hart Lane

11 August 2010 Friendly	Lucchese	0–4	Fiorentina	San Piero a Sieve, Italy
18:00 CEST (UTC+02:00)		Report	Gilardino 11'; Natali 15'; Matos 76', 86'

14 August 2010 Friendly	Fortis Juventus	0–8	Fiorentina	Borgo San Lorenzo, Italy
--:-- CEST (UTC+02:00)		Report	Marchionni 7'; Natali 10', 16'; Gilardino 23', 42' (pen.); Gamberini 51'; Seferovic 76', 83'

18 August 2010 Orange Trophy Final	Valencia	2–0	Fiorentina	Valencia, Spain
21:30 CEST (UTC+02:00)	Soldado 72'; Aduriz 77'	Report		Stadium: Mestalla; Attendance: 41,000; Referee: Juan Martínez Munuera (Spain)

== Competitions ==
=== Overall ===
Competition	Started round	Current position	Final position	First match	Last match
Serie A	Matchday 1	—	9th	29 August 2010	22 May 2011
Coppa Italia	Third round	—	Round of 16	26 October 2010	14 December 2010

Last updated: 22 May 2011

=== Serie A ===
==== League table ====
Pos	Team	Pld	W	D	L	GF	GA	GD	Pts	Qualification or relegation
7	Juventus	38	15	13	10	57	47	+10	58	
8	Palermo	38	17	5	16	58	63	−5	56	Qualification to Europa League third qualifying round (Note: As Internazionale won the 2010–11 Coppa Italia and already qualified for the Champions League, Palermo entered the 2011–12 UEFA Europa League third qualification round as the cup runners-up.)
9	Fiorentina	38	12	15	11	49	44	+5	51 (Note: Fiorentina finished ahead of Genoa on head-to-head points: Fiorentina 1–0 Genoa, Genoa 1–1 Fiorentina.)	
10	Genoa	38	14	9	15	45	47	−2	51	
11	ChievoVerona	38	11	13	14	38	40	−2	46 (Note: Chievo finished ahead of Parma and Catania on head-to-head points: Chievo: 6 pts, Parma: 5 pts, Catania: 4 pts.)	

Source: Lega Serie A
Rules for classification: 1) points; 2) head-to-head points; 3) head-to-head goal difference; 4) head-to-head goals scored; 5) goal difference; 6) number of goals scored.

==== Results summary ====
Overall								Home						Away					
Pld	W	D	L	GF	GA	GD	Pts	W	D	L	GF	GA	GD	W	D	L	GF	GA	GD
38	12	15	11	49	44	+5	51	9	6	4	28	18	+10	3	9	7	21	26	−5

Last updated: 22 May 2011.
Source: Competitive matches

==== Results by round ====
Round	1	2	3	4	5	6	7	8	9	10	11	12	13	14	15	16	17	18	19	20	21	22	23	24	25	26	27	28	29	30	31	32	33	34	35	36	37	38
Ground	H	A	H	A	H	H	A	H	A	H	A	H	A	A	H	A	H	A	H	A	H	A	H	A	A	H	A	H	A	H	A	H	H	A	H	A	H	A
Result	D	L	L	D	W	L	L	W	D	W	L	W	L	D	W	L	L	D	W	D	D	L	W	D	W	D	D	W	W	D	D	L	D	W	W	L	D	D
Position	7	17	18	18	14	16	19	15	15	11	13	12	13	14	12	13	14	15	12	12	12	13	12	12	10	11	12	10	8	9	9	10	10	9	9	9	9	9

Updated to match(es) played on 22 May 2011. Source: Competitive matches
A = Away; H = Home; W = Win; D = Draw; L = Loss

==== Matches ====
29 August 2010 1	Fiorentina	1–1	Napoli	Florence
20:45 CEST (UTC+02:00)	Krøldrup (yellow card) 16'; D'Agostino 50'; Vargas (red card) 67'; Zanetti (yellow card) 81'	Report	Cavani 7', (yellow card) 16'; Lavezzi (yellow card) 24'; Blasi (yellow card) 54' (yellow-red card) 74'; Campagnaro (yellow card) 67'; Hamšík (yellow card) 78'	Stadium: Stadio Artemio Franchi; Attendance: 25,025; Referee: Andrea Gervasoni

12 September 2010 2	Lecce	1–0	Fiorentina	Lecce
15:00 CEST (UTC+02:00)	Di Michele 8'; Ferrario (yellow card) 15'; Rosati (yellow card) 81'	Report	Ljajić (yellow card) 90+4'	Stadium: Stadio Via del Mare; Attendance: 8,979; Referee: Daniele Orsato

19 September 2010 3	Fiorentina	1–2	Lazio	Florence
18:00 CEST (UTC+02:00)	Ljajić 19' (pen.); Gamberini (yellow card) 89'	Report	Ledesma 32'; Radu (yellow card) 45'; Kozák 67'	Stadium: Stadio Artemio Franchi; Attendance: 20,868; Referee: Antonio Damato

22 September 2010 4	Genoa	1–1	Fiorentina	Genoa
20:45 CEST (UTC+02:00)	Mesto 18'; Chico (yellow card) 44'; Dainelli (yellow card) 51'; Sculli (yellow card) 62'	Report	Gilardino 11'; Pasqual (yellow card) 25'; Frey (yellow card) 61'	Stadium: Stadio Luigi Ferraris; Attendance: 23,101; Referee: Paolo Tagliavento

26 September 2010 5	Fiorentina	2–0	Parma	Florence
15:00 CEST (UTC+02:00)	Ljajić 61' (pen.); Natali (yellow card) 67'; De Silvestri 77'	Report	Valiani (yellow card) 56'; Lucarelli (yellow card) 60'; Paci (yellow card) 65'; Candreva (yellow card) 73'	Stadium: Stadio Artemio Franchi; Attendance: 21,126; Referee: Andrea Romeo

3 October 2010 6	Fiorentina	1–2	Palermo	Florence
15:00 CEST (UTC+02:00)	Gilardino 58'; Ljajić (yellow card) 65'; Montolivo (red card) 73'	Report	Iličić 20'; Pastore 37'; Balzaretti (yellow card) 63'	Stadium: Stadio Artemio Franchi; Attendance: 22,795; Referee: Paolo Mazzoleni

17 October 2010 7	Sampdoria	2–1	Fiorentina	Genoa
15:00 CEST (UTC+02:00)	Palombo (yellow card) 39'; Lucchini (yellow card) 40'; Pazzini (yellow card) 60'; Ziegler 81'; Cassano 82', (yellow card) 83'	Report	Marchionni 6'; Natali (yellow card) 19'; Gilardino (yellow card) 69'; Felipe (yellow card) 80'; Comotto (yellow card) 90+4'	Stadium: Stadio Luigi Ferraris; Attendance: 22,738; Referee: Christian Brighi

24 October 2010 8	Fiorentina	2–1	Bari	Florence
15:00 CEST (UTC+02:00)	Donadel 34', (yellow card) 62'; Natali (yellow card) 46'; Marchionni (yellow card) 56'; Pasqual (yellow card) 68'; Gilardino 82'	Report	Almirón (yellow card) 57'; Belmonte (yellow card) 68'; Parisi 90+2'	Stadium: Stadio Artemio Franchi; Attendance: 23,874; Referee: Emidio Morganti

31 October 2010 9	Catania	0–0	Fiorentina	Catania
20:45 CET (UTC+01:00)	Potenza (yellow card) 46'	Report	Comotto (yellow card) 80'; Natali (yellow card) 88'	Stadium: Stadio Angelo Massimino; Attendance: 13,990; Referee: Nicola Rizzoli

7 November 2010 10	Fiorentina	1–0	Chievo	Florence
15:00 CET (UTC+01:00)	Cerci 80'; Boruc (yellow card) 86'	Report	Andreolli (yellow card) 27'; Mantovani (yellow card) 53'	Stadium: Stadio Artemio Franchi; Attendance: 21,236; Referee: Carmine Russo

10 November 2010 11	Roma	3–2	Fiorentina	Rome
20:45 CET (UTC+01:00)	Simplício 45'; Borriello 51'; Perrotta 77'; N. Burdisso (yellow card) 88'	Report	Donadel (yellow card) 9'; Santana (yellow card) 31'; Boruc (yellow card) 42'; Gilardino 68'; D'Agostino 90'	Stadium: Stadio Olimpico; Attendance: 28,804; Referee: Mauro Bergonzi

14 November 2010 12	Fiorentina	1–0	Cesena	Florence
15:00 CET (UTC+01:00)	Gilardino 59'; Comotto (yellow card) 53'; D'Agostino (yellow card) 90+3'	Report	Benalouane (yellow card) 36'	Stadium: Stadio Artemio Franchi; Attendance: 20,340; Referee: Antonio Danilo Giannoccaro

20 November 2010 13	Milan	1–0	Fiorentina	Milan
20:45 CET (UTC+01:00)	Flamini (yellow card) 32'; Ibrahimović 45', (yellow card) 90+2'	Report	Krøldrup (yellow card) 90+3' (red card) 90+4'	Stadium: San Siro; Attendance: 47,549; Referee: Antonio Damato

28 November 2010 14	Juventus	1–1	Fiorentina	Turin
15:00 CET (UTC+01:00)	Bonucci (yellow card) 44'; Pepe 83', (yellow card) 90+5'; Marchisio (yellow card) 90+2'	Report	Motta 4' (o.g.); Pasqual (yellow card) 63'; Felipe (yellow card) 80' (yellow-red card) 88'; Comotto (yellow card) 82'	Stadium: Stadio Olimpico di Torino; Attendance: 21,740; Referee: Paolo Valeri

5 December 2010 15	Fiorentina	1–0	Cagliari	Florence
15:00 CET (UTC+01:00)	Mutu 52', (yellow card) 57'; Donadel (yellow card) 54'; Boruc (yellow card) 90'	Report	Astori (yellow card) 51'	Stadium: Stadio Artemio Franchi; Attendance: 21,644; Referee: Sebastian Peruzzo

12 December 2010 16	Udinese	2–1	Fiorentina	Udine
15:00 CET (UTC+01:00)	Sánchez (yellow card) 45'; Armero 64'; Di Natale 80'; Denis (yellow card) 90+3'	Report	Mutu (yellow card) 17'; Vargas (yellow card) 20'; Donadel (yellow card) 21'; Santana 31'; Krøldrup (yellow card) 76'; Bolatti (yellow card) 83'; De Silvestri (yellow card) 90+4'	Stadium: Stadio Friuli; Attendance: 14,107; Referee: Andrea De Marco

6 January 2011 18	Bologna	1–1	Fiorentina	Bologna
20:45 CET (UTC+01:00)	Di Vaio 4'; Moras (yellow card) 90+2'	Report	Marchionni (yellow card) 56'; Santana 67'; Krøldrup (yellow card) 77'	Stadium: Stadio Renato Dall'Ara; Attendance: 15,926; Referee: Antonio Danilo Giannoccaro

9 January 2011 19	Fiorentina	3–2	Brescia	Florence
15:00 CET (UTC+01:00)	Gilardino 72'; Santana 86'; Ljajić 88'	Report	Diamanti 30'; Kone (yellow card) 40'; Córdova 45+4'	Stadium: Stadio Artemio Franchi; Attendance: 20,664; Referee: Paolo Mazzoleni

16 January 2011 20	Napoli	0–0	Fiorentina	Naples
15:00 CET (UTC+01:00)	Campagnaro (yellow card) 86'	Report		Stadium: Stadio San Paolo; Attendance: 49,443; Referee: Luca Banti

23 January 2011 21	Fiorentina	1–1	Lecce	Florence
15:00 CET (UTC+01:00)	Pasqual (yellow card) 40'; Gilardino 56'; Donadel (yellow card) 88'	Report	Di Michele 29'; Giacomazzi (yellow card) 51'; Brivio (yellow card) 55'; Jeda (yellow card) 63'	Stadium: Stadio Artemio Franchi; Attendance: 20,292; Referee: Davide Massa

30 January 2011 22	Lazio	2–0	Fiorentina	Rome
15:00 CET (UTC+01:00)	Mauri (yellow card) 45+3'; Kozák 69' (pen.), 73'; Lichtsteiner (yellow card) 89'	Report	Gulan (yellow card) 10'; Donadel (yellow card) 39'; Cerci (yellow card) 67'; Krøldrup (yellow card) 68'	Stadium: Stadio Olimpico; Attendance: 20,655; Referee: Andrea De Marco

2 February 2011 23	Fiorentina	1–0	Genoa	Florence
20:45 CET (UTC+01:00)	Santana 40'; Donadel (yellow card) 63'; Pasqual (yellow card) 83'	Report	Moretti (yellow card) 45'; Veloso (yellow card) 70'	Stadium: Stadio Artemio Franchi; Attendance: 20,129; Referee: Domenico Celi

6 February 2011 24	Parma	1–1	Fiorentina	Parma
15:00 CET (UTC+01:00)	Amauri 15', (yellow card) 15'; Galloppa (yellow card) 19'; Mirante (yellow card) 48'; Gobbi (yellow card) 48'; Lucarelli (yellow card) 50'; Morrone (yellow card) 67'; Džemaili (yellow card) 90+1'	Report	D'Agostino (yellow card) 45+1', (goal) 47' (pen.); Gamberini (yellow card) 56'; Marchionni (yellow card) 64'	Stadium: Stadio Ennio Tardini; Attendance: 13,446; Referee: Gabriele Gava

13 February 2011 25	Palermo	2–4	Fiorentina	Palermo
12:30 CET (UTC+01:00)	Pastore 7'; Balzaretti (yellow card) 15'; Muñoz (yellow card) 24'; Nocerino 48'; Bovo (yellow card) 66'	Report	Gilardino 36'; Pasqual (yellow card) 45+1'; Camporese 70'; Bovo 78' (o.g.); Montolivo 88'	Stadium: Stadio Renzo Barbera; Attendance: 24,571; Referee: Carmine Russo

16 February 2011 17	Fiorentina	1–2	Internazionale	Florence
18:30 CET (UTC+01:00)	Comotto (yellow card) 20'; Pasqual 32'	Report	Camporese 6' (o.g.); Pazzini 62'; Stanković (yellow card) 86'	Stadium: Stadio Artemio Franchi; Attendance: 31,595; Referee: Antonio Damato

20 February 2011 26	Fiorentina	0–0	Sampdoria	Florence
15:00 CET (UTC+01:00)	Montolivo (yellow card) 68'	Report	Koman (yellow card) 11'; Volta (yellow card) 58'	Stadium: Stadio Artemio Franchi; Attendance: 21,723; Referee: Nicola Rizzoli

27 February 2011 27	Bari	1–1	Fiorentina	Bari
15:00 CET (UTC+01:00)	Codrea (yellow card) 25'; Ghezzal 87'	Report	Gilardino 21'; Natali (yellow card) 44'; Comotto (yellow card) 56'	Stadium: Stadio San Nicola; Attendance: 14,739; Referee: Marco Guida

6 March 2011 28	Fiorentina	3–0	Catania	Florence
15:00 CET (UTC+01:00)	Mutu 21', 24', (yellow card) 22'; Pasqual (yellow card) 28'; Donadel (yellow card) 50'; Gilardino 61'	Report	Pesce (yellow card) 54'	Stadium: Stadio Artemio Franchi; Attendance: 20,813; Referee: Domenico Celi

13 March 2011 29	Chievo	0–1	Fiorentina	Verona
20:45 CET (UTC+01:00)	Mantovani (yellow card) 47'; Pellissier (yellow card) 74'; Andreolli (yellow card) 83'; Cesar (yellow card) 90+1'	Report	Vargas 48'; Gilardino (yellow card) 83'	Stadium: Stadio Marc'Antonio Bentegodi; Attendance: 10,489; Referee: Andrea De Marco

20 March 2011 30	Fiorentina	2–2	Roma	Florence
20:45 CET (UTC+01:00)	Mutu 22'; Gamberini 35'; Comotto (yellow card) 61'; Natali (yellow card) 90+3'	Report	Totti 28' (pen.), 52'; Mexès (yellow card) 66'; Ménez (yellow card) 82'	Stadium: Stadio Artemio Franchi; Attendance: 23,634; Referee: Paolo Mazzoleni

3 April 2011 31	Cesena	2–2	Fiorentina	Cesena
15:00 CEST (UTC+02:00)	Santon (yellow card) 14'; Jiménez 18'; Caserta 86'	Report	Mutu (yellow card) 14'; Gilardino 35'; Montolivo (yellow card) 39', (goal) 69'; De Silvestri (yellow card) 49'	Stadium: Stadio Dino Manuzzi; Attendance: 17,876; Referee: Gabriele Gava

10 April 2011 32	Fiorentina	1–2	Milan	Florence
20:45 CEST (UTC+02:00)	Donadel (yellow card) 21'; Gilardino (yellow card) 72'; Santana (yellow card) 75'; Vargas 79'	Report	Seedorf 8'; Pato 41'; Ibrahimović (yellow card) 77' (red card) 87'	Stadium: Stadio Artemio Franchi; Attendance: 32,677; Referee: Emidio Morganti

17 April 2011 33	Fiorentina	0–0	Juventus	Florence
15:00 CEST (UTC+02:00)		Report	Sørensen (yellow card) 62'	Stadium: Stadio Artemio Franchi; Attendance: 34,483; Referee: Daniele Orsato

24 April 2011 34	Cagliari	1–2	Fiorentina	Cagliari
15:00 CEST (UTC+02:00)	Cossu 46'	Report	Donadel (yellow card) 12'; Krøldrup (yellow card) 21'; Cerci 45+1', 49'	Stadium: Stadio Sant'Elia; Attendance: 8,000; Referee: Daniele Doveri

1 May 2011 35	Fiorentina	5–2	Udinese	Florence
15:00 CEST (UTC+02:00)	Vargas 9'; D'Agostino 21', 51'; Montolivo (yellow card) 66'; Cerci 71', 86'	Report	Badu (yellow card) 14'; Pinzi 29'; Asamoah 57'; Benatia (yellow card) 64'; Cuadrado (yellow card) 67'	Stadium: Stadio Artemio Franchi; Attendance: 24,604; Referee: Christian Brighi

8 May 2011 36	Internazionale	3–1	Fiorentina	Milan
15:00 CEST (UTC+02:00)	Pazzini 25'; Cambiasso 28'; Coutinho 77'	Report	De Silvestri (yellow card) 27'; Gilardino 74'	Stadium: San Siro; Attendance: 55,879; Referee: Luca Banti

15 May 2011 37	Fiorentina	1–1	Bologna	Florence
12:30 CEST (UTC+02:00)	Cerci 20'; Santana (yellow card) 43'; Krøldrup (red card) 54'	Report	Britos (yellow card) 5'; Ramírez 50', (yellow card) 79' (yellow-red card) 79'; Cherubin (yellow card) 64'	Stadium: Stadio Artemio Franchi; Attendance: 21,026; Referee: Antonio Danilo Giannoccaro

22 May 2011 38	Brescia	2–2	Fiorentina	Brescia
15:00 CEST (UTC+02:00)	Éder 19'; Zebina (yellow card) 51'; Accardi 88'; Zoboli (yellow card) 89'	Report	Vargas 2'; Cerci 74'	Stadium: Stadio Mario Rigamonti; Attendance: 3,000; Referee: Gianpaolo Calvarese

=== Coppa Italia ===
26 October 2010 Third round	Fiorentina	1–0 (a.e.t.)	Empoli	Florence
20:45 CEST (UTC+02:00)	De Silvestri (yellow card); Camporese (yellow card); Babacar 119' (yellow card)		Tonelli (yellow card)	Stadium: Stadio Artemio Franchi; Attendance: 5,000; Referee: Domenico Celi

30 November 2010 Fourth round	Fiorentina	3–0	Reggina	Florence
20:45 CET (UTC+01:00)	Babacar 29'; Marchionni 44'; Cerci 47'			Stadium: Stadio Artemio Franchi; Attendance: 4,904; Referee: Carmine Russo

14 December 2010 Round of 16	Parma	2–1	Fiorentina	Parma
21:00 CET (UTC+01:00)	Crespo 115', 118'		Camporese (yellow card) 71'; Santana 113', (yellow card) 114'	Stadium: Stadio Ennio Tardini; Attendance: 3,517; Referee: Paolo Mazzoleni

== Statistics ==
=== Appearances and goals ===
				Total				Serie A		Coppa Italia		
N	Pos.	Name	Nat.	GS	App	Gls	Min	App	Gls	App	Gls	Notes
1	GK	Frey	(France)	11	11	-13	990	11	−13			(−) denotes goals conceded
2	DF	Krøldrup	(Denmark)	20	22		1874	19		3		
4	MF	Donadel	(Italy)	28	31	1	2345	29	1	2		
5	DF	Gamberini	(Italy)	35	36	1	3225	35	1	1		
6	MF	Vargas	(Peru)	19	24	4	1667	24	4			
7	MF	Santana	(Argentina)	22	30	5	2006	28	4	2	1	
8	FW	Jovetić	(Montenegro)									
9	FW	Babacar	(Senegal)	6	21	2	710	18		3	2	
10	FW	Mutu	(Romania)	18	20	4	1521	20	4			
11	FW	Gilardino	(Italy)	35	36	12	3060	35	12	1		
14	DF	Natali	(Italy)	16	20		1404	20				
15	MF	Zanetti	(Italy)	5	7		452	6		1		Transferred to Brescia
16	DF	Felipe	(Brazil)	3	6		303	5		1		Loaned out to Cesena
18	MF	Montolivo	(Italy)	29	29	2	2546	29	2			
20	DF	Papa Waigo	(Senegal)	1	2		86	1		1		Loaned out to Grosseto
21	MF	D'Agostino	(Italy)	13	21	3	1339	20	3	1		
22	MF	Ljajić	(Serbia)	15	28	3	1601	26	3	2		
23	DF	Pasqual	(Italy)	33	34	1	2997	34	1			
24	MF	Cerci	(Italy)	20	27	8	1601	24	7	3	1	
25	DF	Comotto	(Italy)	17	22		1683	20		2		
27	FW	Seferovic	(Switzerland)		3		92	1		2		
29	DF	De Silvestri	(Italy)	25	28	1	2228	26	1	2		
28	MF	Bolatti	(Argentina)	3	13		429	10		3		Transferred to Internacional
30	DF	Gulan	(Serbia)	6	9		536	6		3		
31	DF	Camporese	(Italy)	8	11	1	824	9	1	2		
32	MF	Marchionni	(Italy)	15	26	2	1432	24	1	2	1	
35	GK	Avramov	(Serbia)	3	3	-4	300	1	−2	2	−2	(−) denotes goals conceded
36	MF	Carraro	(Italy)	1	1		90			1		
39	DF	Masi	(Italy)		1		8			1		
84	GK	Boruc	(Poland)	26	27	-29	2340	26	−29	1		(−) denotes goals conceded
85	MF	Behrami	(Switzerland)	11	13		966	13				
89	GK	Neto	(Brazil)									

Last updated: 5 July
Source: aic.football.it
Ordered by players' shirt numbers
0 shown as blank

=== Goalscorers ===
Rank	No.	Pos	Nat	Name	Serie A	Coppa Italia	Total
1	11	FW	(Italy)	Alberto Gilardino	12	0	12
2	24	FW	(Italy)	Alessio Cerci	7	1	8
3	7	MF	(Argentina)	Mario Santana	4	1	5
3	21	MF	(Italy)	Gaetano D'Agostino	5	0	5
5	6	MF	(Peru)	Juan Manuel Vargas	4	0	4
5	10	FW	(Romania)	Adrian Mutu	4	0	4
7	22	FW	(Serbia)	Adem Ljajić	3	0	3
8	9	FW	(Senegal)	Khouma Babacar	0	2	2
8	18	MF	(Italy)	Riccardo Montolivo	2	0	2
8	32	MF	(Italy)	Marco Marchionni	1	1	2
11	4	MF	(Italy)	Marco Donadel	1	0	1
11	5	DF	(Italy)	Alessandro Gamberini	1	0	1
11	23	DF	(Italy)	Manuel Pasqual	1	0	1
11	29	DF	(Italy)	Lorenzo De Silvestri	1	0	1
11	31	DF	(Italy)	Michele Camporese	1	0	1
Own goal					2	0	2
Totals					49	5	54

Last updated: 22 May 2011
