= Nicolò Manfredini =

Italian footballer

Personal information
- Date of birth: 1 May 1988 (age 38)
- Place of birth: Ferrara, Italy
- Height: 1.90 m (6 ft 3 in)
- Position: Goalkeeper

Youth career
- SPAL
- 2005–2007: Fiorentina

Senior career*
Years	Team	Apps	(Gls)
2007–2012	Fiorentina	0	(0)
2007–2008	→ Carpi (loan)	34	(0)
2008–2009	→ Gubbio (loan)	27	(0)
2009–2011	→ Reggiana (loan)	27	(0)
2012–2017	Modena	80	(0)
2017–2019	Spezia	17	(0)
2019–2025	Benevento	24	(0)

International career
2006	Italy U-19	1	(0)
2015	Italy University	6	(0)
- * Club domestic league appearances and goals as of 27 April 2025

Nicolò Manfredini (born 1 May 1988) is an Italian footballer who plays as a goalkeeper.

== Career ==
=== Early career ===
Born in Ferrara, Emilia–Romagna, Manfredini started his career at hometown club SPAL. In June 2005, he was signed by Tuscany and Serie A club Fiorentina. He was the starting goalkeeper of the club's Primavera under-20 team from 2005–06 to 2006–07; Manfredini finished as the losing side in the round of 16 in the 2006–07 season.

In 2007, Manfredini left for Serie D club Carpi. In the next season, he was signed by Lega Pro Seconda Divisione club Gubbio.

=== Reggiana ===
In July 2009, he left for Lega Pro Prima Divisione club Reggiana along with Marco Romizi and Lorenzo Morelli for a peppercorn fee of €1,000 each. In the same window, La Viola also signed Matteo Arati (for €400,000) and Maxwell Acosty (for €125,000); it made the deal was a partial cash-plus-player-swap. Manfredini was a backup in the first season for Luca Tomasig. In the second season, Manfredini became the first choice.

=== Return to Fiorentina ===
In June 2011, Fiorentina bought back Manfredini (for €215,000) along with Ramzi Aya (for €215,000), Samuele Bettoni (for €500) and Piergiuseppe Maritato (for €100,000); while Arati formally returned to Reggio Emilia (for €180,500) (Romizi and Morelli already returned to Florence in 2010). (Aya also returned to Reggio Emilia in August for €500) The deals made La Viola paid Reggiana €349,500 in net.

However, along with Edoardo Pazzagli, his successor in the youth team in 2007, they were unable to sign with another Italian minor team. Manfredini also could not return to Reggio Emilia like team-mate Aya, as the club had signed Marco Silvestri. Pazzagli successfully became the fourth choice of the first team, while a young keeper (b. 1995), Luca Lezzerini, became the fourth. Manfredini only able to play in the Primavera (literally "spring") league as overage player, replacing the departed Andrea Seculin. He shared the starting role with Lezzerini (played in rounds 1 to 6), ahead of another young player (born 1995) Alessandro Bacci (played in rounds 12 and 13 after Manfredini was sent off during round 12). Both players were, in fact, eligible to Allievi Nazionali U-17 team, but La Viola was lack of goalkeeper born between 1992 and 1994, as Marcos Miranda was allowed to join a professional team.

After the winter break, Fiorentina completed the paperwork to sign Tomas Švedkauskas, who became the first choice of the reserve. Švedkauskas was an EU minor summer signing which require the club to provide extra general education. As Manfredini was not eligible to the playoff round in May as overage player, Manfredini was not longer needed by the youth team who aimed for younger players.

Manfredini finally returned to first team on 6 April, where he received a call-up as third keeper (which was occupied by Edoardo Pazzagli but his contract was set to expire on 30 June 2012), behind second-choice Neto. He was dropped in the next two matches (week 32 and 34) but returned for rescheduled 33 and week 35 (as second keeper after Artur Boruc was suspended).

=== Modena ===
On 25 July 2012, Manfredini moved to Modena on co-ownership for a fee of €300. He was the backup of U21 internationals Simone Colombi. In June 2013, Fiorentina and Modena failed to agree on the price for the remain 50% registration rights, but La Viola did not submit a bid to Lega Serie A to buy back Manfredini, thus on 21 June it was announced that Modena signed the remaining half for free. Despite the expire of the loan of Colombi, Modena also signed Marco Costantino from Juventus in player swap to compete with Manfredini. On 23 July, the chance of Manfredini was further limited due to the arrival of Carlo Pinsoglio.

Manfredini played more regularly throughout the 2015–16 Serie B season, and was made first-choice goalkeeper for the following 2016–17 Lega Pro club campaign, for which he was also named club captain.
