= Tommaso Scuffia =

Italian footballer

Personal information
- Date of birth: 12 December 1991 (age 34)
- Place of birth: Macerata, Italy
- Position: Goalkeeper

Team information
- Current team: Roccella

Youth career
- Maceratese

Senior career*
Years	Team	Apps	(Gls)
2008–2009	Maceratese	21	(0)
2009–2011	Fiorentina	0	(0)
2011	→ Rimini (loan)	5	(0)
2011–2013	Melfi	71	(0)
2013–2016	Catanzaro	15	(0)
2015	→ Lecce (loan)	6	(0)
2016–2017	Ancona	23	(0)
2017–	Roccella	18	(0)

International career
2008–2009	Italy U19	2	(0)
- * Club domestic league appearances and goals as of 12 February 2018

Tommaso Scuffia (born 12 December 1991) is an Italian footballer who plays as a goalkeeper for Roccella.

== Club career ==
=== Early career ===
Born in Macerata, Marche, Scuffia started his career at hometown club Maceratese. Scuffia made his senior debut in 2008–09 Serie D. Scuffia left the club in January 2009, 6 months before the club was expelled from the inter-regional league due to financial difficulties.

=== Fiorentina ===
In mid of 2008–09 season he was signed by Serie A club Fiorentina. He was immediately named in the squad for 2009 Torneo di Viareggio as the backup of Andrea Seculin. He wore no.31 shirt in the first team in 2009–10 season as the fourth keeper, behind Sébastien Frey, Vlada Avramov and Seculin. However Scuffia was not eligible to 2009–10 UEFA Champions League List B (along with Marcos Miranda), and La Viola named Simone David as fourth keeper as David was eligible. Scuffia was in the pre-season camp of the first team in July 2009. Since April 2010 Miranda became the fourth keeper, and received numbers of call-up. In the reserve Seculin was the first choice, Scuffia played 7 times and Andrea Tozzo 5 times.

With the signing of Artur Boruc in mid-2010 to replace the injured Frey, Scuffia's shirt number was stripped as well as Marcos Miranda became the fourth (the fifth if counting Frey). Scuffia also excluded from the first team squad for the pre-season camp in July 2010. Scuffia re-acquired a shirt number in October (No. 34). He also received first team call-up again since the injury of Avramov, ahead Miranda in early January 2011.

However his fourth choice role was short-lived. On 10 January 2011 he left for Serie D (fifth tier at that time) club Rimini, few days after the signing of Neto.

=== Melfi ===
In July 2011 he joined Lega Pro Seconda Divisione club Melfi on a reported free transfer. Scuffia succeeded Andrea Pozzato as first choice. That season Melfi hired the entire squad with young players ranged from born 1989 to 1993.

=== Catanzaro ===
On 3 July 2013 Scuffia was signed by Catanzaro in a 2+1-year contract. On 22 January 2015 Scuffia and Gianluca Di Chiara were signed by fellow Lega Pro club U.S. Lecce in temporary deals, with an option to purchase.

=== Ancona ===
On 31 August 2016 Scuffia was signed by U.S. Ancona 1905 as a free agent.

== International career ==
Scuffia received call-up from Marche regional Allievi representative team in December 2006. He made his national team debut for the under-19 team against Romania in December 2008, the first match of U-19 born 1991 team. As a Serie D player, he replaced Simone Colombi at half-time. He played the next match in January 2009 against Denmark U18 for Italy U-18 team, de facto the same team with U-19 born 1991 team that season (second half of 2008–09 season). Both team were coached by Massimo Piscedda. However, since leaving for la Viola, Scuffia did not receive any call-up due to lack of play time.

Scuffia received his first call-up in November 2008 from Antonio Rocca, for a goalkeeper training camp. He received a call-up from A.Rocca again in 2009.
