= Maritato =

Maritato is an Italian surname. Notable people with the surname include:

- James Maritato (born 1972), American professional wrestler
- Piergiuseppe Maritato (born 1989), Italian footballer
