= Andrea Seculin =

Italian footballer (born 1990)

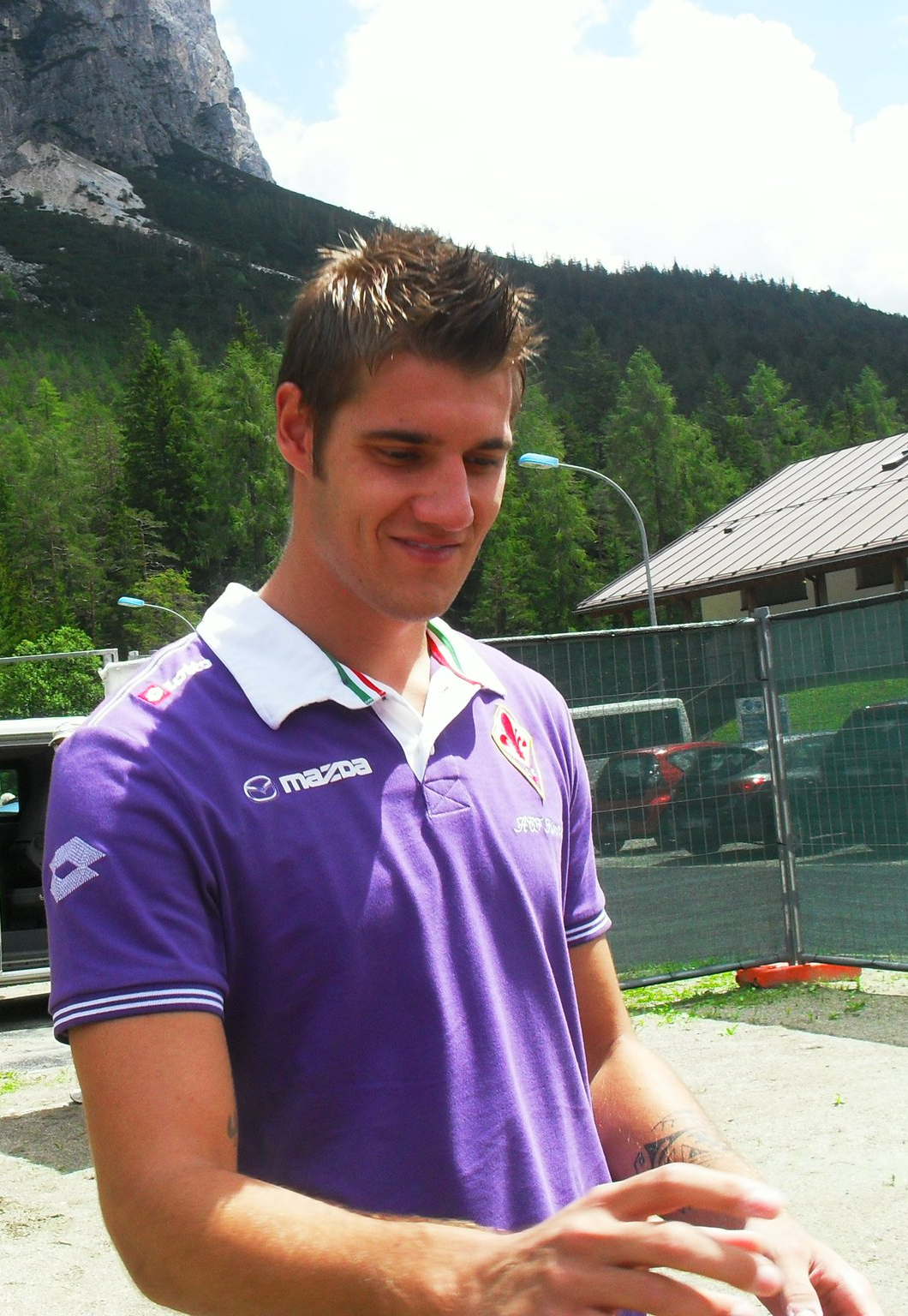
- Seculin with Fiorentina in July 2011

Personal information
- Date of birth: 14 July 1990 (age 36)
- Place of birth: Gorizia, Italy
- Height: 1.90 m (6 ft 3 in)
- Position: Goalkeeper

Team information
- Current team: Arezzo
- Number: 90

Youth career
- Pro Romans
- 2006?–2008: South Tyrol
- 2008–2010: Fiorentina

Senior career*
Years	Team	Apps	(Gls)
2010–2013	Fiorentina	0	(0)
2011–2013	→ Juve Stabia (loan)	35	(0)
2013–2021	Chievo	10	(0)
2013–2014	→ Avellino (loan)	24	(0)
2019–2020	→ Sampdoria (loan)	0	(0)
2021–2022	SPAL	6	(0)
2022	Pistoiese	16	(0)
2022–2024	Modena	18	(0)
2024–2025	Trapani	21	(0)
2025	→ Modena (loan)	0	(0)
2025–2026	Reggiana	3	(0)
2026–	Arezzo	0	(0)

International career
2009	Italy U-20	1	(0)
2009–2010	Italy U-21	4	(0)
- * Club domestic league appearances and goals as of 8 May 2026

Andrea Seculin (born 14 July 1990) is an Italian professional footballer who plays as a goalkeeper for Serie B club Arezzo.

== Club career ==
=== Early career ===
Born in Gorizia, Venezia Giulia, Seculin started his career in Pro Romans of Romans d'Isonzo. He received a call-up to Friuli-Venezia Giulia Allievi representative team in 2005, for Coppa Nazionale Primavera, an event that 19 Italian regions against each other. Friuli-Venezia Giulia finished as the 12th place.

He then left for FC South Tyrol and played in Berretti under-20 team, the top level of youth leagues for Lega Pro clubs.

=== Fiorentina ===
In January 2008 he was signed by Tuscany club Fiorentina, for €300,000 on a 4 1/2-year contract. Seculin immediately entered the Primavera under-20 team (Lega Calcio version of Berretti league), taking the starting role from Edoardo Pazzagli. Seculin finished as losing semi-finalists in 2008 playoffs round. Seculin also played in quarter-finals and Pazzagli played in the two leg of the round of 16. Seculin was the starting keeper in the "spring" in the 2008–09 season and was the fourth keeper of the first team. However, he was not eligible to the list B of 2008–09 UEFA Champions League, in which Matteo Bacciosi became the fourth keeper in UCL instead. Primavera team did not qualify for the playoffs round in the 2008–09 season. In summer 2009 Seculin signed a new five-year contract with La Viola which ended on 30 June 2014.

Seculin also entered 2009–10 UEFA Champions League squad as the third keeper in the 22-man senior squad, replacing the left of Marco Storari. That season la Viola had Sébastien Frey and Vlada Avramov as first choice and backup. With youth team, the spring did not qualify again in 2009–10 season.

Since the signing of Artur Boruc in 2010–11 Serie A, he became the fourth keeper of the first team (or third not counting injured Frey; ahead Marcos Miranda and Tommaso Scuffia; in January became fifth after signing Neto) and as an overage player of the youth team, finished as the runner-up of 2011 Torneo di Viareggio, winning 2011 Coppa Italia Primavera. He also finished as the semi-finalists of the playoffs round of the youth league.

Seculin was awarded no. 33 for the first team in 2008–09 season. He then changed to no.90 in 2009–10 season and re-took 33 in 2010–11 season. In the first half-season he wore no.44.

=== Juve Stabia ===
In July 2011 he left for Serie B newcomer Juve Stabia. The club loaned numbers of players from la Viola as well as other team. He had to compete with Simone Colombi for the first choice in first half of season, played 6 games, on round 1, 3, 8 to 10 and 15. He wore no.90 shirt that season, his year of birth. Since January 2012 Seculin was the regular starter.

=== Chievo ===
==== Loan to Avellino ====
In July 2013 Seculin was signed by Chievo for undisclosed fee, re-joining fellow U21 internationals Marco Silvestri and Sergio Viotti. Seculin was immediately left for Serie B newcomer Avellino.

==== Loan to Sampdoria ====
On 2 September 2019, he was loaned to Serie A club Sampdoria with an option to purchase.

=== SPAL ===
On 28 July 2021 he joined SPAL.

=== Pistoiese ===
On 31 January 2022, Seculin signed a three-year contract with Pistoiese.

=== Modena ===
On 6 July 2022, Seculin signed with Modena. On 14 July 2023, his contract with Modena was extended until 2024, with an option for another year.

=== Trapani ===
On 12 July 2024, Seculin moved to Trapani in Serie C. On 29 January 2025, Seculin returned to Modena on loan.

=== Reggiana ===
On 9 August 2025, Seculin signed a one-season contract with Reggiana.

== International career ==
Seculin received his first U-21 team call-up in 2008. He made his debut in March 2009, a friendly. That match de facto played by players born in or after 1988 for an event usually played by U-20 (Four Nations Tournament), but all players were selected by U-21 coach Pierluigi Casiraghi to select junior member to the final round of 2009 U-21 Euro, which the age limit in fact was born in 1986 or after. Seculin successfully entered the final squad of 2009 UEFA European Under-21 Football Championship, as understudy of Andrea Consigli and Salvatore Sirigu, both 3 years older than Seculin.

He was the backup keeper of Vincenzo Fiorillo in 2011 UEFA European Under-21 Football Championship qualification first round. He played his competitive debut in the round 2 of the qualification, against the weakest team Luxembourg U-21. He also played the round 3 against Bosnia and Herzegovina. Vito Mannone then became the first choice in round 4 and 5, with Fiorillo and Seculin became the second and third. The coach Pierluigi Casiraghi later picked Mattia Perin and then Alberto Frison as backup.

After Azzurrini was eliminated in the playoffs round, new coach Ciro Ferrara recalled Seculin in the first match Ferrara in charge, winning Turkey 2–1 on 17 November 2010. Seculin was substituted by Perin at half time. Ferrara then used keepers with professional appearances instead of Seculin and Perin, nor Fiorillo who had a handful club appearances. After Seculin made his professional debut in August 2011, he did not receive any call-up yet. Instead, Seculin played for Italy under-21 Serie B representative team against Italy U20 in December 2011, an unofficial charity match.
