= Stadio Antonio Bianco =

Multi-use stadium in Gallipoli, Italy

Coordinates: 40°2′47″N 18°0′26″E

- Interactive map of Stadio Antonio Bianco
- Former names: Stadio Lido San Giovanni (1969-1994)
- Location: Gallipoli, Italy
- Owner: Municipality of Gallipoli
- Capacity: 5,000
- Surface: Synthetic Grass

Construction
- Opened: 1969
- Renovated: 1978; 1994; 2003

Tenant
- Gallipoli Calcio

Stadio Antonio Bianco is a multi-use stadium in Gallipoli, Italy. It is currently used mostly for football matches and is the home ground of Gallipoli Football 1909. The stadium holds 5,000 people.
