= Marcos Miranda =

Brazilian footballer (born 1992)

Personal information
- Full name: Marcos Vinícius Santos Miranda
- Date of birth: 6 March 1992 (age 34)
- Place of birth: Itabuna, Brazil
- Height: 1.90 m (6 ft 3 in)
- Position: Goalkeeper

Team information
- Current team: Gol Gohar
- Number: 25

Youth career
- 2005–2006: Campo Grande
- 2007–2009: Treviso
- 2009–2011: Fiorentina

Senior career*
Years	Team	Apps	(Gls)
2011–2013	Pro Vercelli	3	(0)
2013–2014	Sorrento	14	(0)
2014–2015	Chievo	0	(0)
2014–2015	→ Istra 1961 (loan)	0	(0)
2016	Rio Claro		
2016	Paranavaí	3	(0)
2017	CEOV		
2017	Interporto		
2018–2019	Brasil de Pelotas	1	(0)
2020	Náutico	5	(0)
20200	Vila Nova	4	(0)
2021	Uberlândia	12	(0)
2021	Santa Cruz	1	(0)
2022	Floresta	26	(0)
2023–2025	Amazonas	5	(0)
2025–	Gol Gohar	0	(0)
- * Club domestic league appearances and goals as of 9 September 2023

Marcos Vinícius Santos Miranda, sometimes known as Marcão, (born 6 March 1992) is a Brazilian footballer who plays as a goalkeeper for Gol Gohar.

== Career ==
=== Youth career ===
Born in Itabuna, Brazil, Marcos Miranda started his career at Campo Grande. As the club was associated with agent company Pedrinho VRP, Miranda moved to Italy along with other players. Miranda was signed by Treviso. He was the member of Allievi Nazionali under-17 team in 2008–09 season. In July 2009, few days before the bankruptcy of Treviso, he was signed by Fiorentina for €250,000, signing 5-year contract. In June Davide Carcuro also returned to Treviso from La Viola for €60,000.

Miranda was the backup keeper of Andrea Seculin in Primavera under-20 team. The other backup keeper were Andrea Tozzo (2009–10) and Tommaso Scuffia (until January 2011). Miranda finished as the runner-up of 2011 Torneo di Viareggio as unused sub. Miranda also won 2010–11 Coppa Italia Primavera again as unused bench. The team finished as the losing semi-finalists of the Primavera league.

In 2010–11 Serie A, Marcos Miranda was awarded no.12 shirt as fourth keeper of the first team (or fifth counting injured Frey), behind Artur Boruc, Vlada Avramov and Seculin. Miranda was in the pre-season camp of the first team in July 2010. Miranda also got a shirt number during 2009–10 Serie A, as no.33. Miranda received a few call-up from the first team since April 2010, took the fourth keeper role from Scuffia. Miranda's fourth choice role was ended in January 2011 after Scuffia reacquired the role, and followed by the signing of Neto.

=== Pro Vercelli ===
Marcos Miranda did not receive a call-up to La Viola''s 2011 pre-season camp. In August 2011 Miranda left for Pro Vercelli along with Pietro Iemmello. Miranda was an overage member of Berretti under-19 team He also became the backup of Alex Valentini in the first team. Miranda also played once in 2011–12 Coppa Italia Lega Pro, in the first round of knock-out stage. In May he played the last round of the league for the first team, a 0–0 draw with Carpi. He returned to backup role in promotion playoffs, which Pro Vercelli was the winner.

In June 2012 Pro Vercelli was gifted half of the registration rights of Miranda for a peppercorn of €50, as well as the temporary deal of Iemmello was renewed. On 21 June 2013 it was confirmed that Pro Vercelli got the remain 50% registration rights as La Viola neither formed any agreement with Pro Vercelli before the deadline nor submit a mandatory bid to the league office afterwards.

On 2 September 2013 Pro Vercelli swapped keeper Miranda with keeper Aniello Ambrosio of Sorrento, both in definitive deal.

=== Sorrento ===
Marcos Miranda was the understudy of Giuseppe Polizzi in 2013–14 Lega Pro Seconda Divisione.

=== Chievo ===
In summer 2014 he was signed by Chievo. On 23 July 2014 he was signed by Istra 1961, where he played for the third-tier reserve team until the end of his loan in the summer of 2015.

=== Brasil de Pelotas ===
He returned to Brazil in 2016, and had spells in state competitions with Rio Claro, Paranavaí, Operário-MT and Interporto, before signing with Brasil de Pelotas in December 2017.
