= Ramzi Aya =

Italian footballer

Personal information
- Date of birth: 8 February 1990 (age 36)
- Place of birth: Rome, Italy
- Height: 1.84 m (6 ft 0 in)
- Position: Defender

Youth career
- Roma Team Sport
- 2006–2010: Fiorentina

Senior career*
Years	Team	Apps	(Gls)
2010–2013	Reggiana	81	(1)
2014–2015	Rimini	13	(1)
2014–2015	Torres	28	(2)
2015–2017	Fidelis Andria	63	(3)
2017–2019	Catania	78	(2)
2019–2020	Pisa	18	(1)
2020	→ Salernitana (loan)	15	(0)
2020–2022	Salernitana	25	(1)
2022	Reggina	4	(0)
2022–2025	Avellino	16	(1)
2023–2024	→ Casertana (loan)	0	(0)

International career
2009–2011	Italy U20	2	(0)
- * Club domestic league appearances and goals as of 27 April 2025

Ramzi Aya (Arabic: رَمْزِيّ آيَة; born 8 February 1990) is an Italian professional footballer who plays as a defender. He is of Tunisian descent.

== Club career ==
Born in Rome, capital of Lazio (and Italy), Aya started his career at "Roma Team Sport", a club which signed a partnership agreement with A.S. Roma. In 2005, he was selected to Lazio region U15 representative team, as a midfielder.

=== Fiorentina (youth) ===
In 2006, he moved to ACF Fiorentina's Allievi U17 team, rejoining fellow Lazio representatives Federico Masi. Aya was promoted to the reserve in 2007–08 season, which he only entered the play-offs round once in 2008. The team lost to Sampdoria in semi-finals. Fiorentina reserve failed to enter Campionato Nazionale Primavera playoffs in 2009 and 2010.

Since 2008 Aya also received a shirt number from the first team, No.43 (vacated by Paolo Pincio) and no.41 (vacated by Tagliani) in 2009–10. Aya was eligible to UEFA List B criteria since 2008 (until a possible 2011–12 edition), thus he was included in the List B squad for Viola in 2008–09 and 2009–10 UEFA Champions League.

Aya played twice for the first team in post-season friendly in 2009 and 2010.

=== Reggiana ===
In June 2010 Aya left for Reggiana in co-ownership deal along with Samuele Bettoni, for €200,000 and €500 respectively. Co-currently, Marco Romizi and Lorenzo Morelli returned to La Viola for €200,000 and €150,000 respectively. Thus, Fiorentina paid the Emilia minor club €149,500 in net before the end of 2009–10 financial year of Reggiana, as a de facto incentive to act as a farm for Viola. In August 2010 Reggiana signed Piergiuseppe Maritato for €500.

Aya made 23 starts in 2010–11 Lega Pro Prima Divisione. In June 2011 Fiorentina bought back Viola youth product Niccolò Manfredini, (€215,000), Aya (€215,000), Samuele Bettoni (€500) and Maritato (€100,000) from Reggiana, co-currently sold Reggiana youth product Matteo Arati back to Reggio Emilia for €180,500. It made Reggiana received €350,000 in net before the end of 2010–11 season.

On 13 August Maritato was sold to Vicenza in co-ownership deal for a peppercorn fee of €500. Aya followed the footsteps of Maritato to leave Florence on 31 August 2011 also for €500 in co-ownership deal. The club failed to find a buyer for its youth product, which Aya forced to return to Reggiana. Fiorentina failed to sell Bettoni, N.Manfredini, and Edoardo Pazzagli who did not play any game in 2011–12 season.

In the second season with Reggiana, Aya made 30 starts in 2011–12 Lega Pro Prima Divisione.

On 23 June he is purchased entirely by Reggiana.

=== Fidelis Andria ===
On 30 August 2015, he joined Andria for free.

=== Salernitana ===
On 21 January 2020, he joined Serie B club Salernitana on loan until the end of the 2019–20 season, with Salernitana holding an obligation to purchase his rights at the completion of the loan term.

=== Reggina ===
On 24 January 2022, he signed with Reggina.

=== Avellino ===
On 6 August 2022, Aya joined Avellino. On 8 September 2023, he was loaned to Casertana. He never appeared for Casertana due to a knee injury.

== International career ==
Aya was capped twice for Italy national under-20 football team, coached by Francesco Rocca. He played once in 2008–09 season, against Germany in the last match of 2008–09 Four Nations. Aya was not selected to 2009 Mediterranean Games, but selected to de facto U20 B team in annual post-season fixture of U20, unofficial friendlies against Serie D League XI, coached by U19 coach Massimo Piscedda. In June 2011 Aya was recalled by F.Rocca for the last match of 2010–11 Four Nations against Poland.

== Career statistics ==
=== Club ===
As of match played 23 August 2023

Appearances and goals by club, season and competition
Club	Season	League			National Cup (Note: Includes Coppa Italia, Coppa Italia Serie D)		Europe		Other		Total	
Club	Season	Division	Apps	Goals	Apps	Goals	Apps	Goals	Apps	Goals	Apps	Goals
Reggiana	2010–11	Lega Pro 1	27	0	2	0	—		—		29	0
Reggiana	2011–12	Lega Pro 1	31	0	0	0	—		—		31	0
Reggiana	2012–13	Lega Pro 1	23	0	2	0	—		2 (Note: Appearance(s) in Lega Pro play-out)	0	27	0
Reggiana	Total		81	0	4	0	—		2	0	87	0
Rimini	2013–14	Lega Pro 2	13	1	0	0	—		—		13	1
Sassari Torres	2014–15	Lega Pro	28	2	0	0	—		—		28	2
Fidelis Andria	2015–16	Lega Pro	29	0	0	0	—		—		29	0
Fidelis Andria	2016–17	Lega Pro	34	3	2	0	—		—		36	3
Fidelis Andria	Total		63	3	2	0	—		—		65	3
Catania	2017–18	Serie C	34	1	2	0	—		4 (Note: Appearance(s) in Serie C play-off)	0	40	1
Catania	2018–19	Serie C	35	1	3	0	—		5	0	43	1
Catania	Total		69	2	5	0	—		9	0	83	2
Pisa	2019–20	Serie B	18	1	2	1	—		—		20	2
Salernitana	2019–20	Serie B	15	0	0	0	—		—		15	0
Salernitana	2020–21	Serie B	23	1	1	0	—		—		24	1
Salernitana	2021–22	Serie A	2	0	1	0	—		—		3	0
Salernitana	Total		40	1	2	0	—		—		42	1
Reggina	2021–22	Serie B	4	0	0	0	—		—		4	0
Avellino	2022–23	Serie C	16	1	1	0	—		—		17	1
Career total			332	11	16	1	—		11	0	359	12
