= Daniele Giordano =

Italian footballer (born 1991)

Personal information
- Date of birth: 4 March 1991 (age 35)
- Height: 1.88 m (6 ft 2 in)
- Position: Goalkeeper

Team information
- Current team: Città di Gragnano

Youth career
- ?–2008: Lecce
- 2008–2010: Celtic

Senior career*
Years	Team	Apps	(Gls)
2010–2011	Celtic	0	(0)
2010–2011	→ Montrose (loan)	3	(0)
2011–2013	Perugia	42	(0)
2013–2014	Melfi	25	(0)
2014–2015	Ischia	14	(0)
2015–2016	Taranto	2	(0)
2016	Madre Pietra Daunia	1	(0)
2017–	Città di Gragnano	16	(0)

International career
2006–2007	Italy U-16	4	(0)
- * Club domestic league appearances and goals

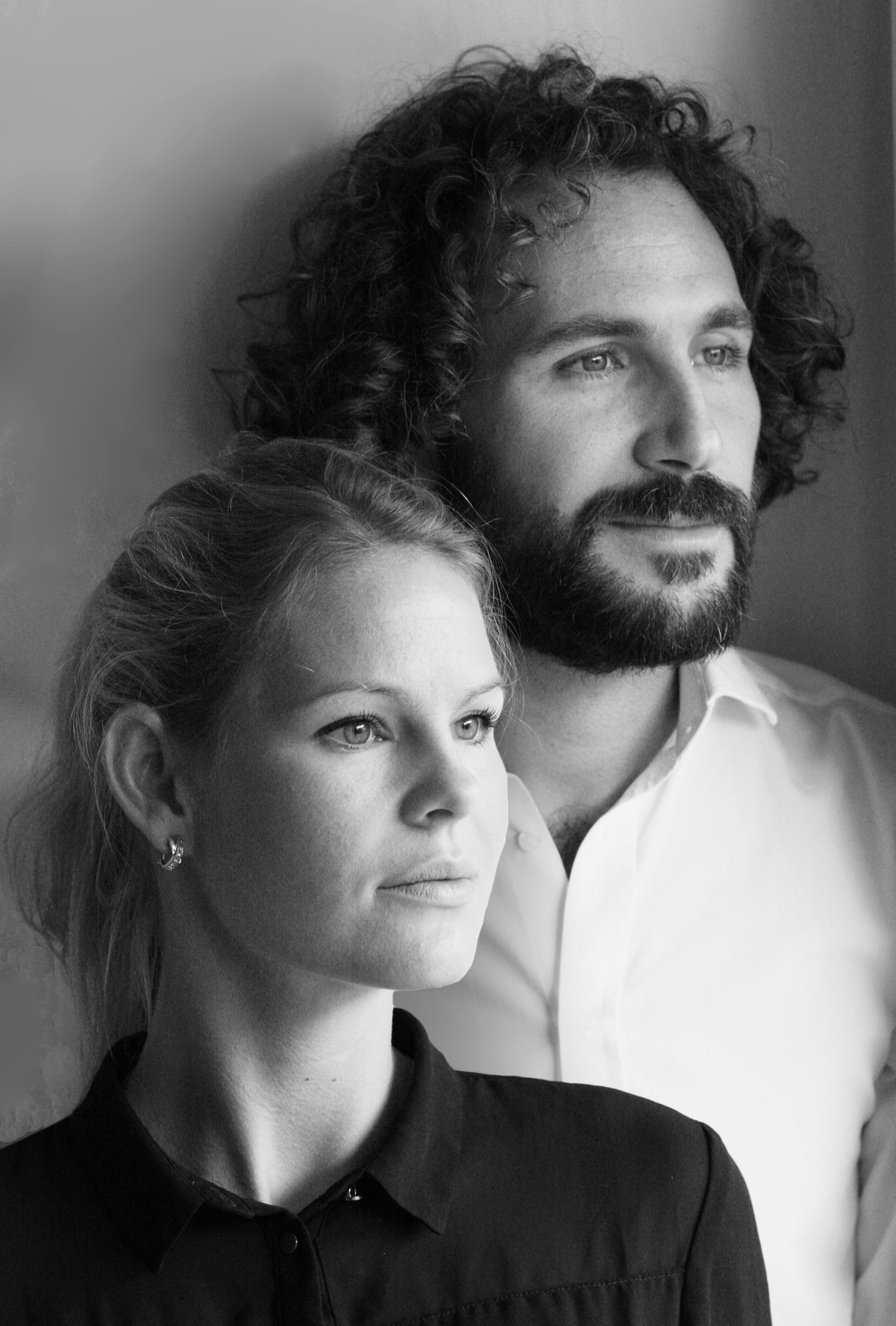
Daniele Giordano and Nadine Hadamik

Daniele Giordano (born 4 March 1991) is an Italian footballer who plays as a goalkeeper for Afro-Napoli

== Club career ==
He started his career at U.S. Lecce before moving to Celtic in 2008. In 2010, he was loaned to Montrose. In 2011, he returned to Italy for A.C. Perugia Calcio. On 18 July 2013 he was released.

He was signed by Melfi. The club qualified to 2014–15 Serie C as the 6th of Group B of 2013–14 Lega Pro Seconda Divisione.

== International career ==
=== Representative team ===
Since he returned to Italy, he was picked by Italy Lega Pro under-20 representative team, a feeder team of the Italian national youth team, for a training camp and practice match. He also played for U-16 and U-17 team (as unused bench) before left for Scotland. He wore no.1 shirt in 2008 UEFA European Under-17 Football Championship elite qualification, but as the backup of Filippo Perucchini, because Simone Colombi left the squad in the final minutes.
