= Samuele Bettoni =

Italian footballer

Personal information
- Date of birth: 28 November 1989 (age 36)
- Place of birth: Rome, Lazio, Italy
- Height: 1.88 m (6 ft 2 in)
- Position: Left-back

Team information
- Current team: Fanfulla

Youth career
- Fiorentina

Senior career*
Years	Team	Apps	(Gls)
2009–2012	Fiorentina	0	(0)
2010	→ Olbia (loan)	0	(0)
2010–2011	→ Reggiana (loan)	3	(0)
2011	→ Sangiovannese (loan)	9	(0)
2012	Mendrisio	12	(2)
2013–2015	Scandicci	58	(1)
2015–2016	MapelloBonate	34	(2)
2016	Varesina	8	(0)
2016–2018	OltrepòVoghera	51	(6)
2018–2019	Casale	27	(3)
2019–2020	Pro Sesto	21	(0)
2020–2021	Casale	31	(3)
2021–2022	Legnano	27	(0)
2022–	Fanfulla	26	(1)
- * Club domestic league appearances and goals as of 19:15, 26 February 2023 (UTC)

Samuele Bettoni (born 28 November 1989) is an Italian footballer who currently plays for Fanfulla.

== Biography ==
=== Fiorentina ===
Bettoni started his career at ACF Fiorentina. He played a few games in end-season friendlies for the first team in May 2009. He was named in the List B squad (club youth product) for 2009–10 UEFA Champions League, which was not included in the 25-men List A quota. That season UEFA demanded the players must had two year uninterrupted experience with the club prior registration. Prior that experience, Bettoni also in the List B squad for 2007–08 UEFA Cup but not named in 2008–09 UEFA Champions League despite eligible.

Bettoni also played as an overage player in 2009–10 season for the under-20 team, such as in 2010 Torneo di Viareggio. The team failed to qualify to the playoffs of Primavera League in 2008–09 and 2009–10 season. Bettoni played in the playoffs of 2008 edition.

Bettoni wore no.43 shirt for the first season in 2009–10 season and previously no. 36 in 2007–08 season. He did not have a shirt number in 2008–09 season.

=== Reggiana ===
In June 2010 la Viola sold Bettoni to Reggiana along with Piergiuseppe Maritato (€500) and defender Ramzi Aya (for €200,000), all three in co-ownership deal. Bettoni was tagged for a peppercorn fee of €500 only. It was part of the compensation that Marco Romizi (€200,000) and Lorenzo Morelli (€150,000) returned to Florence. Co-owned player Matteo Arati also returned to Reggio Emilia on loan for one season. However Bettoni only played 3 times in Lega Pro Prima Divisione (Italian third division) and 9 more in Lega Pro Seconda Divisione (fourth division) for his loan club SanGiovannese.

=== Return to Fiorentina ===
In June 2011 Aya (€215,000), Bettoni (€500), Piergiuseppe Maritato (€100,000) and Niccolò Manfredini (€215,000) were returned to Florence and Arati formally returned to Reggio Emilia (€180,500). However Bettoni failed to find a new club along with Manfredini, while Aya returned to Emilia in late August for €500.

Bettoni was released on 31 December 2011 as his contract was due to expire on 30 June 2012.
