= Lorenzo Morelli =

Italian footballer

Personal information
- Date of birth: 25 April 1988 (age 38)
- Place of birth: Florence, Italy
- Height: 1.85 m (6 ft 1 in)
- Position: Forward

Team information
- Current team: Asd Rondinella Marzocco

Youth career
- Fiorentina

Senior career*
Years	Team	Apps	(Gls)
2008–2009	Fiorentina	0	(0)
2009	→ Venezia (loan)	4	(1)
2009–2010	Reggiana	5	(0)
2010–2012	Prato	8	(1)
2012–2015	Scandicci	41	(24)
2015–present	A.S.D. Fortis Juventus 1909	8	(6)
- * Club domestic league appearances and goals

Lorenzo Morelli (born 25 April 1988) is an Italian footballer who plays for Lega Pro club Prato.

== Biography ==
=== Fiorentina (youth) ===
Born in Florence, capital of Tuscany, Morelli started his career at ACF Fiorentina. He was a member of the Allievi U17 team in the 2004–05 season. From 2005 to 2008, Morelli was a member of the reserve and was an overage player (1 year older than the 1989 age limit) in the first half of the 2008–09 season. With the reserve, he entered the semi-finals of 2007–08 Campionato Nazionale Primavera, losing to Sampdoria. However the first choice forwards were Matthias Lepiller and Samuel Di Carmine.

Morelli also included in List B squad of la Viola in 2007–08 UEFA Cup (along with Di Carmine) and 2008–09 UEFA Champions League. He wore no.42 shirt for the first team in 2007–08 season and changed to No.38 in 2008–09 season. Fiorentina did not lend Morelli to other clubs in the 2008–09 season as he was the only List B forward for the team, or much younger player had to be named. After Fiorentina was eliminated, Morelli moved to Venezia in February 2009, as part of the deal of Matteo Chinellato. Fiorentina did not named any List B forward in 2008–09 UEFA Cup.

=== Venezia ===
Morelli played 4 times for Venezia in 2008–09 Lega Pro Prima Divisione. After the season, the club went bankrupt.

=== Reggiana ===
On 3 July 2009, Morelli left for Reggiana along with Niccolò Manfredini and Marco Romizi in a co-ownership deal for €1,000 each. Morelli had a good start for Reggiana in which he scored in his debut in 2009–10 Coppa Italia. However, he only played five times in 2009–10 Lega Pro Prima Divisione. However, Fiorentina still paid Reggiana €200,000 and €150,000 respectively to buy back Romizi and Morelli. Concurrently, the Emilia club signed Ramzi Aya and Samuele Bettoni for €200,000 and €500 respectively. Thus, Reggiana received €145,500 in net as a de facto incentive to lend a place to Fiorentina as a "farmland" of its youth product.

=== Prato ===
Despite had €300,000 book value in accounting, Prato accepted to sign Morelli for a peppercorn fee of €500 in a co-ownership deal only on 20 August 2010. Fiorentina announced that Morelli had left for Juve Stabia in June and Gavorrano in July, but apparently collapsed. At Prato, Lorenzo Morelli also joined this namesake, who played for Giovanissimi U15 team in the 2009–10 season.

Morelli only played 3 times in 2010–11 Lega Pro Seconda Divisione. In June 2011, Fiorentina sold Morelli outright to Tuscany and re-signed Lorenzo Tafi and Edoardo Pazzagli. All 3 deals were for a peppercorn fee of €500. Tafi was later re-sold by La Viola again for a peppercorn, but Pazzagli failed to leave the club.

Despite being abandoned by Fiorentina, Prato gave Morelli another season, but in 2011–12 Lega Pro Prima Divisione. The club had been promoted in 2011 to fill the vacancies. Morelli made little improvement and played 5 times in the third division.
