= Michele Camporese =

Italian footballer

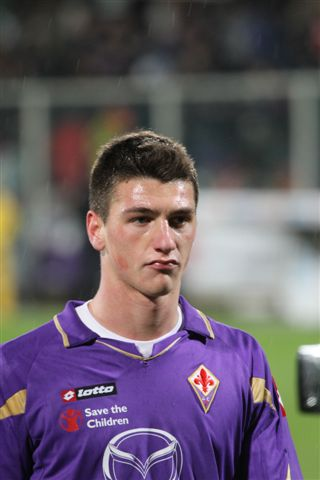

Personal information
- Date of birth: 19 May 1992 (age 34)
- Place of birth: Pisa, Italy
- Height: 1.86 m (6 ft 1 in)
- Position: Centre-back

Youth career
- Fiorentina

Senior career*
Years	Team	Apps	(Gls)
2010–2015	Fiorentina	16	(1)
2013–2014	→ Cesena (loan)	21	(2)
2014–2015	→ Bari (loan)	21	(0)
2015–2016	Empoli	2	(0)
2016–2018	Benevento	33	(0)
2017–2018	→ Foggia (loan)	38	(1)
2018–2019	Foggia	10	(2)
2019–2022	Pordenone	81	(7)
2022	→ Cosenza (loan)	15	(5)
2022–2023	Reggina	26	(0)
2023–2024	Feralpisalò	2	(0)
2024	→ Cosenza (loan)	19	(1)
2024	Cosenza	7	(0)
2025	Milan Futuro	15	(2)
2026	Livorno	11	(0)

International career
2008	Italy U16	3	(0)
2008–2009	Italy U17	14	(1)
2009–2010	Italy U18	7	(0)
2010–2011	Italy U19	4	(0)
2011–2012	Italy U20	4	(0)
2010–2011	Italy U21	3	(0)
- * Club domestic league appearances and goals as of 23:30, 27 April 2026 (UTC)

Michele Camporese (Italian pronunciation: [miˈkɛːle kampoˈreːze; -eːse]; born 19 May 1992) is an Italian professional footballer who plays as a centre-back.

== Club career ==
Born in Pisa, Tuscany, Camporese is a product of Fiorentina's youth system. He made his debut for the Viola in the Coppa Italia tie against Empoli on 26 October 2010, replacing Alessandro Gamberini in the 66th minute and played the whole extra time. Fiorentina won the match 1–0 assuring qualification to the successive round; Camporese was cautioned in the added time of second half. On 20 November 2010, he made his Serie A debut, replacing the injured Cesare Natali at half time in the match against Milan in San Siro. In the next match he replaced suspended Per Krøldrup as starting centre back, partnered with Alessandro Gamberini against Juventus. On 13 February 2011 he scored his first goal in Serie A in a match won 4–2 against Palermo.

In November 2011 he signed a new 5-year contract with La Viola.

On 13 July 2013, Fiorentina confirmed on their website that Michele Camporese had joined Cesena on a season-long loan.

On 25 July 2015, Camporese departed Fiorentina for Empoli after spending five seasons in Florence. It was confirmed by Empoli that he had agreed a contract until 30 June 2018.

On 18 July 2019, he signed a 2-year contract with Pordenone.

On 31 January 2022, Camporese moved on loan to Cosenza.

On 20 July 2022, he signed a three-year contract with Reggina.

On 4 September 2023, Camporese joined Feralpisalò on a contract until June 2025.

On 10 January 2024, he returned to Cosenza on loan with an obligation to buy.

On 17 January 2025, Camporese joined the newly created Serie C club Milan Futuro, which serves as the reserve team of Serie A club AC Milan. On 1 July 2025, after six months with the team during the 2024–25 season, after relegation to Serie D, Camporese and Milan Futuro reached an agreement to terminate his contract, making him a free agent ahead of the 2025–26 season.

On 28 January 2026, he signed with Serie C club Livorno as a free agent.

== International career ==
Camporese has played for every Italy's youth team level, except for the U-20. With the Italy U-17 team he capped twice at the 2009 UEFA European Under-17 Football Championship qualifying round and another two times in the elite round. In the final tournament, his only appearance arrived as a second half cameo in the semi-final defeat against Germany U-17. He then started all four matches in 2009 FIFA U-17 World Cup, in which the Azzurrini bowed out from the competition after defeat against Switzerland in the quarter finals. With Italy U-19 he played all three matches of the 2011 UEFA U-19 Championship qualifiers.

Under the new regime of Ciro Ferrara, he received his first call-up for Italy U-21 in November 2010. He made his debut on 17 November 2010, replacing Riccardo Brosco in the first half of the friendly match, winning Turkey 2–1.
