= Piergiuseppe Maritato =

Italian footballer (born 1989)

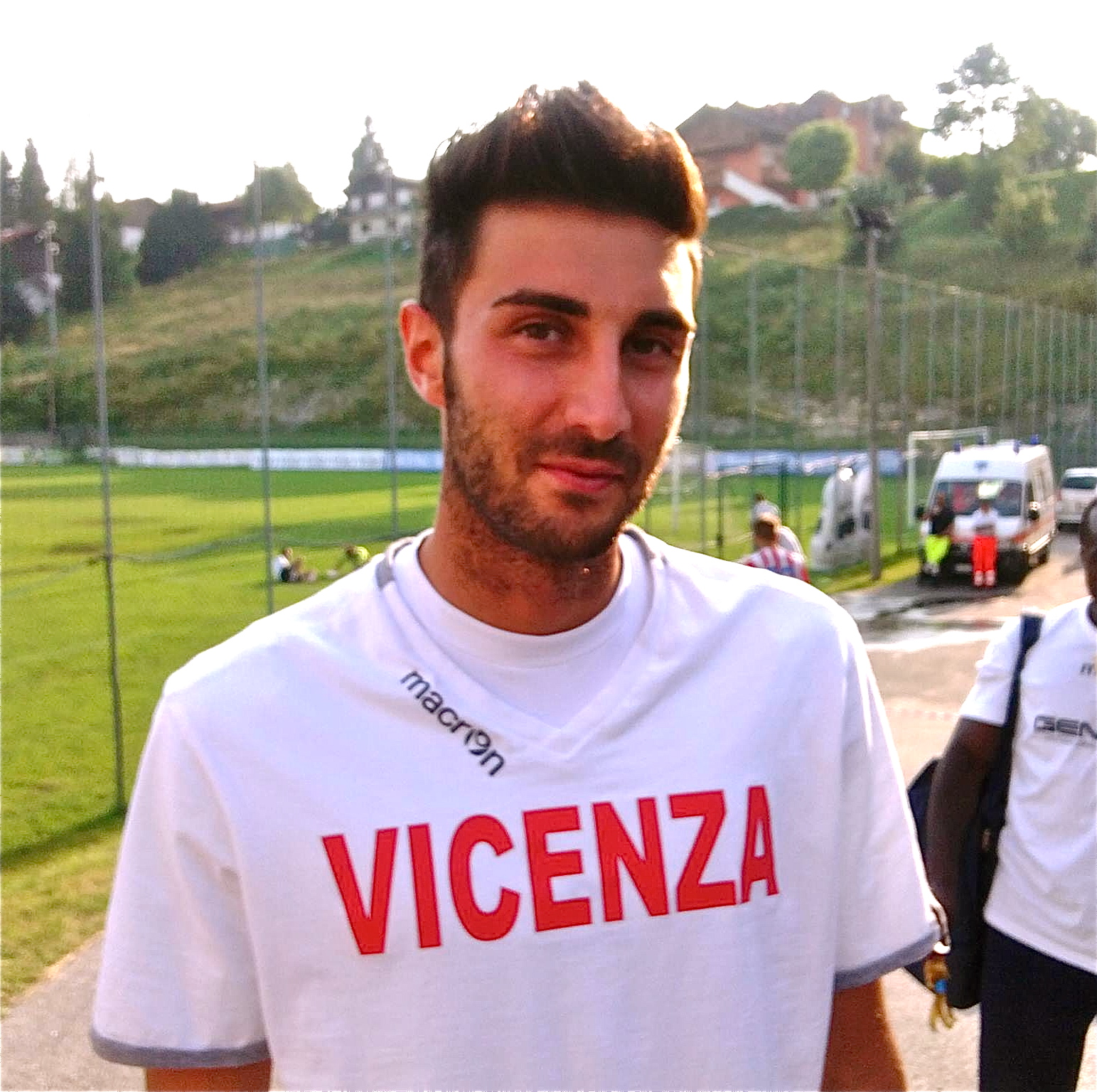
- Piergiuseppe Maritato

Personal information
- Full name: Piergiuseppe Maritato
- Date of birth: 19 March 1989 (age 37)
- Place of birth: Cetraro, Italy
- Height: 1.85 m (6 ft 1 in)
- Position: Striker

Team information
- Current team: USD Breno

Youth career
- Juventus
- 2008–2009: Fiorentina

Senior career*
Years	Team	Apps	(Gls)
2009–2010	Fiorentina	0	(0)
2009–2010	→ Gallipoli (loan)	5	(0)
2010	→ Giulianova (loan)	12	(0)
2010–2011	Reggiana	22	(3)
2011–2016	Vicenza	26	(8)
2012	→ Sorrento (loan)	3	(0)
2012–2013	→ Südtirol (loan)	29	(6)
2015	→ Como (loan)	2	(0)
2015–2016	→ Südtirol (loan)	11	(3)
2016	→ Lucchese (loan)	11	(1)
2016–2017	Livorno	38	(10)
2017	Modena	5	(1)
2018	Pontedera	14	(1)
2018–2019	Reggina	3	(0)
2019	Renate	14	(3)
2020–2021	Piacenza	13	(3)
2021	AlbinoLeffe	6	(0)
2021–2022	Lamezia Terme	11	(0)
2022–2023	Villa Valle	46	(13)
2023–	USD Breno	2	(0)

International career
2005	Italy U-16	1	(1)
2005–2006	Italy U-17	16	(4)
2006	Italy U-18	1	(0)
2009	Italy U-20	3	(0)
- * Club domestic league appearances and goals as of 17 September 2023

Piergiuseppe Maritato (born 19 March 1989) is an Italian footballer who plays for Serie D club USD Breno.

He represented Italy at the 2009 FIFA U-20 World Cup.

== Biography ==
Born in Cetraro, Calabria, Maritato was a player of Juventus F.C. Youth Sector, in Turin, Piedmont.

=== Fiorentina ===
In 2008, he was signed by fellow Serie A club ACF Fiorentina on a free transfer in a 5-year contract. However, it also cost La Viola €300,000 as other fee. In 2009 Maritato was farmed to Gallipoli (along with Massimiliano Tagliani), which the club was unable to pay for the agent fee of just €12,000, for Maritato's transfer. In January 2010 Maritato was signed by Giulianova in a temporary deal.

In summer 2010 Maritato was farmed to Reggiana in a co-ownership deal for a peppercorn fee of €500.

=== Vicenza ===
In June 2011 Fiorentina bought back Maritato for €100,000, Niccolò Manfredini for €215,000, Ramzi Aya for €215,000 and Samuele Bettoni for €500; Matteo Arati to Reggiana for €180,500. The deals made Fiorentina paid Reggiana €350,000 in net in that month. In the same transfer window Maritato joined Serie B club Vicenza in another co-ownership deal for €500 in a 4-year contract. Maritato was farmed to Sorrento on 31 January 2012, and then South Tyrol on 31 August 2012. Vicenza also signed the remain 50% registration rights of Maritato from Fiorentina for free in June 2012. His contract with Vicenza was also extended.

Maritato became a member of the first team of Vicenza in 2013–14 season, after the relegation Lega Pro Prima Divisione. Maritato remained with Vicenza for the first half of 2014–15 Serie B, which the club was accidentally selected to replace A.C. Siena. Maritato picked no.9 shirt. On 2 February 2015 Maritato was signed by Calcio Como. Maritato played 4 times in Serie B and 2 times in Lega Pro respectively in 2014–15 season.

On 14 July 2015 he was re-signed by South Tyrol in a temporary deal.

On 11 August 2016 Maritato was released by Vicenza.

=== Reggina ===
In 2018, he was signed by another Serie C club Reggina after spending six months with Pontedera.

=== Renate ===
On 8 July 2019, he joined Renate on a 2-year contract.

=== AlbinoLeffe ===
On 1 February 2021, he joined AlbinoLeffe.

=== International career ===
Maritato was a player for Italy in 2005 UEFA European Under-17 Championship, which he played twice. He also participated in 2006 UEFA European Under-17 Championship elite round.
