= ASD Città di Gallipoli =

Italian football club

Gallipoli
- Full name: Associazione Sportiva Dilettantistica Città di Gallipoli
- Nickname: Galletti (Roosters)
- Founded: 1966 as US Gallipoli; 1979 as Virtus Gallipoli; 1999 as Gallipoli Calcio; 2010 as Gallipoli Football; 2023 as Città di Gallipoli
- Dissolved: 2026
- Ground: Stadio Antonio Bianco, Gallipoli, Italy
- Capacity: 6,000
- 2023–24: Serie D/H, 15th (relegated after play-out)
Home colours	Away colours

A.S.D. Città di Gallipoli is an Italian association football club based in Gallipoli, Apulia.

== History ==
=== AC Gallipoli ===
The club was founded in 1999 as Associazione Calcio Gallipoli to represent the town of Gallipoli from the province of Lecce. The club quickly rose up the Italian football system, being one of the two who were promoted from Eccellenza Apulia in 2003–04.

After gaining a promotion during their first ever season in Serie D, the club changed its name to Gallipoli Calcio in 2005. Gallipoli then completed it by winning a third consecutive promotion to Serie C1, and making their absolute debut in the Italian third-highest level in the 2006–07 season, which ended in a mid-table place. Former Serie A star Dario Bonetti was then chosen as new boss for the 2007–08 season; he was however sacked later following disagreements with the board, in spite of impressive performances which gave the team a third place in the table. The club ultimately ended the season in ninth place, well below their initial expectations. Former Roma playing hero Giuseppe Giannini was successively appointed as new head coach for Gallipoli's 2008–09 campaign, which ended in triumph, as the giallorossi won a historic first promotion to Serie B as league winners in the final week.

In July 2009, the club's future was put in doubt when President of the club, oil businessman and Senator Vincenzo Barba, announced that the club was up for sale at no cost. In addition, their home stadium (Stadio Antonio Bianco) was declared unfit as Serie B venue, so the club will be forced to play home games at the Via del Mare in Lecce. The situation seriously hampered their preparations for their first season in Serie B and the club was forced to play with its under-19 squad for their Coppa Italia second round match versus Lumezzane in which they were soundly beaten in a 6–0 defeat. With only two weeks before the start of the league, only four first team players were still under contract and no pre-season training camp was organized and no head coach was appointed yet.

On 11 August 2009, an Udine-based company called "D'Odorico Group" took over the club from Barba, putting an end to weeks of speculation regarding the future of the club. The new owner confirmed Giannini as coach. Despite being underdogs, Gallipoli managed to earn 28 points, thus ending the first half of the season in eleventh place, but the situation crumbled in the second leg. Giannini resigned on 22 March 2010 after the club regularly failed to pay salaries to its players. After a two-game tenure under youth team coach Giovanni De Pasquale, former Triestina, Torino and Treviso boss Ezio Rossi was appointed. The change did not have any effect, as Gallipoli were relegated back to the third tier on 16 May 2010. The club had severe financial issues, and this caused at first the inability to request the admission to the Italian third tier (30 June 2010). The club owed Luca Pasqualin of P.D.P. srl for agent fee of €12,000 for signing Piergiuseppe Maritato and upheld by Tribunale Nazionale di Arbitrato per lo Sport of CONI.

Then, in July 2010, a court in Lecce declared the club bankrupt.

=== ASD Gallipoli Football 1909 ===
A new club called A.S.D. Gallipoli Football 1909 was founded on 13 July 2010. Its goal is entering Promozione, the 2nd tier of amatorial Italian football. The first season (2010–2011) finished with Gallipoli that reached the 3° place in graduatory, and then they lose the play-off to be promoted in Eccellenza Apulia. Gallipoli finished 3rd Group B of Promozione Apulia and again lost promotion play-offs. But the club admitted to Eccellenza Apulia later. Gallipoli finished 7th in 2012–13 season. Finally Gallipoli won Eccellenza Apulia in 2013–14 season and promoted to Group H of Serie D. After two seasons in Italian Serie D and after many societary changes, the team downgrades again in Eccellenza Apulia in 2015–16 and stay for the following seven seasons.

=== ASD Città di Gallipoli ===
In the 2022–23 Eccellenza Apulia group B a double representation of the city of Gallipoli is scheduled for the first time, with the participation of Gallipoli Football 1909 and of a new team, called ASD Città di Gallipoli, promoted after victorious campaign in Promozione Apulia in the previous season. At the end of the season, Gallipoli Football 1909 transfer their title to San Pietro Vernotico and ASD Città di Gallipoli become the only team representing the city of Gallipoli in the fifth level of Italian football. Meanwhile, ASD Città di Gallipoli win the group B and the national play-offs and get promoted to Serie D. The club competed in Serie D Group H that season, after earning promotion from Eccellenza Puglia in 2023. However, their Serie D spell ended in that same season following a 2-0 defeat to Angri in the relegation play-out on 12 May 2024. As a result, they were relegated back to the regional Eccellenza Puglia championship.

In the 2025–2026 season, ASD Città di Gallipoli were relegated from Eccellenza to Promozione. However, burdened by a financial crisis and heavy debts, the club failed to register for the 2026–2027 Promozione Puglia championship.

The Puglia Regional Committee (LND FIGC) confirmed in July 2026 that the club had failed to complete its registration and was subsequently removed from the Italian Football Federation.

== Honours ==
- Supercoppa di Lega Serie C: 1
  - Winners: 2009
- Coppa Italia Serie C: 1
  - Winners: 2006

Local

- Serie C1: 1
  - Winners: 2008–09
- Serie C2: 1
  - Winners: 2005–06
- Serie D:
  - Promoted: 2004–05
- Eccellenza Apulia: 2
  - Winners: 2003–04, 2013–14
