= Massimiliano Tagliani =

Italian footballer

Personal information
- Date of birth: 4 April 1989 (age 37)
- Place of birth: Mazzano, Italy
- Height: 1.85 m (6 ft 1 in)
- Position: Defender

Team information
- Current team: USD Breno

Youth career
- 2005: Brescia
- 2005–2009: Fiorentina

Senior career*
Years	Team	Apps	(Gls)
2009–2010	Fiorentina	0	(0)
2009–2010	→ Gallipoli (loan)	13	(0)
2010–2011	Ravenna	22	(1)
2011–2016	Südtirol	94	(1)
2016–2017	Lumezzane	35	(1)
2017–2018	Rezzato	29	(0)
2018–2019	Franciacorta	32	(2)
2019–	USD Breno	110	(4)

International career^{‡}
2004–2005	Italy U-16	2	(0)
2005–2006	Italy U-17	16	(4)
2006–2007	Italy U-18	3	(0)
2007–2008	Italy U-19	5	(0)
2008–2010	Italy U-20	8	(0)
- * Club domestic league appearances and goals as of 17 September 2023 ‡ National team caps and goals as of 7 April 2010

Massimiliano Tagliani (born 4 April 1989) is an Italian professional footballer who plays for Serie D club USD Breno.

He represented Italy at the 2005 UEFA European Under-17 Football Championship (as well as qualifying stage), 2008 UEFA European Under-19 Football Championship and the 2009 Mediterranean Games.

Tagliani joined ACF Fiorentina from Brescia Calcio in 2005 for €1.5 million. In 2010 Tagliani joined Ravenna Calcio in co-ownership deal for a peppercorn fee of €500.

After the bankruptcy of Ravenna, Tagliani joined Südtirol in December.
