= Simone Colombi =

Italian footballer

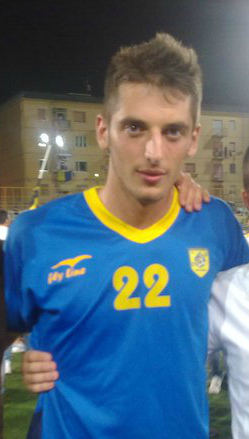

Personal information
- Date of birth: 1 July 1991 (age 35)
- Place of birth: Seriate, Italy
- Height: 1.88 m (6 ft 2 in)
- Position: Goalkeeper

Team information
- Current team: Virtus Entella
- Number: 91

Youth career
- Atalanta

Senior career*
Years	Team	Apps	(Gls)
2009–2014	Atalanta	0	(0)
2009–2010	→ Pergocrema (loan)	18	(0)
2010	→ Alessandria (loan)	2	(0)
2011–2012	→ Juve Stabia (loan)	39	(0)
2012–2013	→ Modena (loan)	36	(0)
2013–2014	→ Padova (loan)	12	(0)
2014	→ Carpi (loan)	20	(0)
2014–2017	Cagliari	3	(0)
2015–2016	→ Palermo (loan)	1	(0)
2016–2017	→ Carpi (loan)	16	(0)
2017–2019	Carpi	58	(0)
2019–2022	Parma	9	(0)
2022–2023	Reggina	26	(0)
2023–2025	Rimini	60	(0)
2025–	Virtus Entella	30	(0)

International career^{‡}
2007–2008	Italy U17	5	(0)
2008–2010	Italy U19	16	(0)
2010	Italy U20	1	(0)
2012–2013	Italy U21	2	(0)
- * Club domestic league appearances and goals as of 13 May 2026 ‡ National team caps and goals as of 2 July 2013

Simone Colombi (born 1 July 1991) is an Italian professional footballer who plays as a goalkeeper for Serie B club Virtus Entella.

== Club career ==
=== Atalanta ===
Born in Seriate, the province of Bergamo, Colombi started his career with hometown club Atalanta Bergamo. He was awarded number 91 shirt in 2008–09 season, as third keeper behind Ferdinando Coppola and Andrea Consigli.

In June 2009, he left for Lega Pro Prima Divisione club Pergocrema. He was the first-choice keeper of Pergocrema until the arrival of Enrico Rossi in February. He regained his place in starting 11 in the return leg of relegation tie-breaker, which the team 1–1 draw with Pro Patria and 3–3 tie in aggregate and won the play-out by more away goal.

In August 2010, he left for fellow Lega Pro club Alessandria via Atalanta, which he was the understudy of Andrea Servili. He also signed a new 3-year contract with Atalanta on 3 August.

In January 2011, he was loaned to Lega Pro Prima Divisione club Juve Stabia. He played regularly since his arrival, helping the team gain promotion to Serie B after the play-offs. As a result, the loan is confirmed for the 2011–12 season. On 31 August 2011, he made his debut in Serie B with Juve Stabia, losing 2–1 at home against Verona. Afterward, he had spells on loan at several Serie B teams, including Modena, Padova and Carpi.

=== Cagliari ===
On 2 July 2014, Serie A side Cagliari acquired Colombi outright from Atalanta, for €1.4 million fee. In the summer of 2015 goes on loan to Palermo.

=== Carpi ===
On 2 July 2016, Serie B side Carpi reached an agreement with Cagliari for the loan of Colombi for one season. On 10 June 2017 Carpi signed him outright.

=== Parma ===
On 11 July 2019, Seria A side Parma signed Colombi to a three-year contract.

=== Reggina ===
On 19 July 2022, Colombia moved to Reggina on a three-year deal.

=== Rimini ===
After Reggina's exclusion from Serie B due to financial irregularities, on 12 October 2023, Colombi signed with Rimini.

=== Virtus Entella ===
On 7 July 2025, Colombi signed with Virtus Entella in Serie B.

== International career ==
=== Under-16 and Under-17 ===
Colombi made his U16 debut at U16 international Val-de-Marne tournament. He played once in U17 Euro qualification, and the two other matches as Filippo Perucchini's backup. The two goalkeepers were also called up to the 2008 Minsk U17 International Tournament to prepare for the elite round. He received a call-up to the elite round qualification. However, Colombi was dropped from the final squad; Perucchini and Daniele Giordano were the starting and reserve keeper respectively.

=== Under-19 ===
Colombi then trained with the U19 team (born 1990 team) to compete for a place in the keeper role for 2009 UEFA European Under-19 Football Championship qualification. However, Perucchini won the backup keeper spot. After the U19 team eliminated early, all born 1990 member were graduated and the season for players born 1991 or after came an early start in December 2008, which Colombi started the match that 3–1 won Romania. He was replaced by Tommaso Scuffia at halftime. He started the next match in March against Norway and Ukraine in April (both replaced by Luigi Sepe as second half) However, he also missed the match in January 2009 and in April (both U18 team for born 1991 or after). He returned to the team in September, started the match against Denmark (replaced by Sepe at 2nd half) and against the Netherlands in October. He started 2 out of 3 matches in the 2010 UEFA European Under-19 Football Championship qualification ahead of Sepe (who also played 1 match). Colombi remained as the starting keeper in the 3 friendlies before the elite round, ahead of his backup Valerio Frasca, Alessandro Iacobucci and Mattia Perin.

Colombi played all 6 matches in elite qualification and the final tournament ahead of Perin. The Azzurrini finished as the bottom of Group B (equal 7th).

=== Under-20 ===
In September 2010, he was called to Italy national under-21 football team, as no.3 keeper behind Vito Mannone and Mattia Perin for the last two qualification matches.

In November 2010, he made his debut on Italy U-20, against Germany He substituted Marco Silvestri in the first half of the match.

=== Under-21 ===
He made his debut with the Italy U-21 on 25 April 2012, in a friendly match against Scotland. Colombi was the backup of Francesco Bardi in 2013 UEFA European Under-21 Football Championship.
