= Vlada Avramov =

Serbian footballer

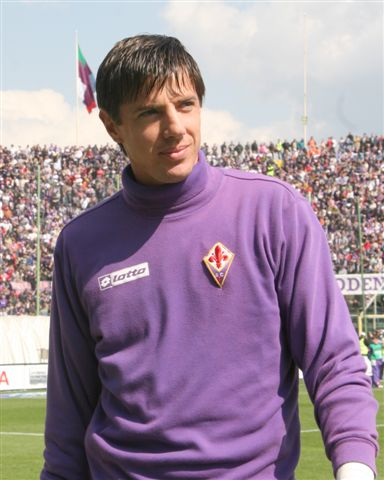
- Avramov in 2008

Personal information
- Date of birth: 5 April 1979 (age 47)
- Place of birth: Novi Sad, SR Serbia, SFR Yugoslavia
- Height: 1.88 m (6 ft 2 in)
- Position: Goalkeeper

Youth career
- 1991–1998: Vojvodina

Senior career*
Years	Team	Apps	(Gls)
1998–2001	Vojvodina	44	(0)
2001–2006	Vicenza	86	(0)
2005–2006	→ Pescara (loan)	26	(0)
2006–2011	Fiorentina	5	(0)
2006–2007	→ Treviso (loan)	38	(0)
2011–2014	Cagliari	31	(0)
2014–2015	Torino	0	(0)
2014–2015	→ Atalanta (loan)	1	(0)
2015	FC Tokyo	8	(0)
Total		239	(0)

International career
2001	FR Yugoslavia U21	3	(0)
2007	Serbia	2	(0)

Managerial career
- 2017–2018: Al-Nasr (GK coach)
- 2018: Brescia (GK coach)
- 2019–2020: Budapest Honvéd (GK coach)
- 2020–2021: Caykur Rizespor (GK coach)
- 2022–2024: Budapest Honvéd (GK coach)
- 2024–2026: Al-Okhdood (GK coach)
- 2026: Oțelul Galați (GK coach)
- * Club domestic league appearances and goals

Vlada Avramov (Serbian Cyrillic: Влада Аврамов; born 5 April 1979) is a Serbian former professional footballer.

== Club career ==
Avramov started his career at First League of FR Yugoslavia with FK Vojvodina. In 2001, he moved to Vicenza, and after played five seasons in Serie B (one of them on loan at Pescara), he joined Fiorentina in August 2006, being immediately loaned to Treviso.

Avramov returned to Fiorentina in June 2007, and after spending the vast majority of the campaign as a backup to Sébastien Frey, made his Serie A debut on 17 February 2008, replacing the latter in the 55th minute of a 2–1 home win against Catania. He would spend his spell as second-choice, however.

On 19 July 2011 Avramov signed for Cagliari. Initially behind Michael Agazzi, he overtook the latter during the 2013–14 season, appearing in 23 matches.

On 19 July 2014 Avramov joined Torino, and was subsequently loaned to Atalanta on 1 September. His contract with Torino expired on 1 July 2015 leaving him as a free agent.

== International career ==
He earned his first call-up to national team against Azerbaijan on 2 September 2006, but he made his debut on 21 November 2007 versus Poland, due to injury of long term regular Vladimir Stojković. He played his second and final international three days later.

== Career statistics ==
=== International ===
Appearances and goals by national team and year
National team	Year	Apps	Goals
Serbia	2007	2	0
Total		2	0

== Coaching career ==
On 11 July 2018, Avramov was officially unveiled as new goalkeeping coach of Serie B club Brescia under head coach David Suazo. From August 2020 until January 2021, he was the goalkeeping coach at the Turkish club Caykur Rizespor.

== Personal life ==
Avramov dated Novi Sad-based swimwear designer Nina Karlavaris for five years.

During August 2013, 34-year-old Cagliari goalkeeper Avramov began dating the Serbian singer Slavica Ćukteraš. The couple were engaged almost immediately, as he reportedly proposed two weeks into the relationship. Due to Ćukteraš's prominence in Serbia, the relationship attracted significant coverage in the country's press. Prompted by difficulties maintaining a long-distance relationship, throughout 2014, they reportedly went through several breakups followed by quick reconciliation. They wed in June 2016 during a vacation on the Maldives in an impromptu beach ceremony that was reportedly a surprise even for the 5-month pregnant bride. The two publicly announced their marriage only months later in October 2016 once their daughter Viktorija was born.

The couple separated during late 2019.
