= 2009–10 ACF Fiorentina season =

Fiorentina
2009–10 season
- President: Andrea Della Valle (until 24 September 2009); Mario Cognigni (from 24 September 2009)
- Manager: Cesare Prandelli
- Stadium: Stadio Artemio Franchi
- Serie A: 11th
- Coppa Italia: Semi-finals
- UEFA Champions League: Round of 16
- Top goalscorer: League: Alberto Gilardino (15); All: Alberto Gilardino (19)
- Highest home attendance: 42,762 vs Bayern Munich (9 March 2010, Champions League)
- Lowest home attendance: 7,000 vs Chievo (14 January 2010, Coppa Italia)
- Average home league attendance: 27,428
| Home colours | Away colours | Third colours |

The 2009–10 season was ACF Fiorentina's 84th season in Italian football in their existence and their 72nd season in the first-tier of Italian football, Serie A. Having finished fourth the previous season ahead of Genoa, La Viola earned qualification into the UEFA Champions League for the second year in a row.

== Club ==
=== Coaching staff ===
| Position | Staff |
|---|---|
| Head coach | (Italy) Cesare Prandelli |
| Assistant coach | (Italy) Gabriele Pin |
| Goalkeeping coach | (Italy) Vincenzo Di Palma |
| Physical trainer | (Italy) Giambattista Venturati |

Source: Violachannel.tv and Lega-calcio.it

== Players ==
=== Squad information ===
| N | Pos. | Nat. | Name | Age | EU | Since | App | Goals | Ends | Transfer fee | Notes |
|---|---|---|---|---|---|---|---|---|---|---|---|
| 1 | GK | (France) | Frey | 30 | EU | 2005 | 196 | 0 | 2013 | €5.75M | |
| 2 | DF | (Denmark) | Krøldrup | 31 | EU | 2006 | 107 | 6 | 2012 | €4M | |
| 4 | MF | (Italy) | Donadel | 27 | EU | 2005 | 165 | 4 | 2011 | €1.3M | |
| 5 | DF | (Italy) | Gamberini | 28 | EU | 2005 | 152 | 4 | 2013 | €3M | |
| 6 | MF | (Peru) | Vargas | 26 | Non-EU | 2008 | 72 | 10 | 2013 | €12M | |
| 7 | MF | (Germany) | Nsereko | 20 | EU | 2009 | 0 | 0 | 2014 | €5.7M | |
| 8 | FW | (Montenegro) | Jovetić | 20 | Non-EU | 2008 | 68 | 12 | 2013 | €8M | |
| 10 | FW | (Romania) | Mutu | 31 | EU | 2006 | 118 | 63 | 2012 | €8M | |
| 11 | FW | (Italy) | Gilardino | 27 | EU | 2008 | 90 | 42 | 2013 | €14M | |
| 14 | DF | (Italy) | Natali | 31 | EU | 2009 | 25 | 0 | 2012 | €2.8M | |
| 15 | MF | (Italy) | Zanetti | 33 | EU | 2009 | 29 | 0 | 2011 | €2M | |
| 16 | DF | (Brazil) | Felipe | 25 | EU | 2009 | 24 | 0 | 2011 | Loan | |
| 17 | MF | (Italy) | Di Tacchio | 20 | EU | 2009 | 0 | 0 | 2013 | Co-ownership | |
| 18 | MF | (Italy) | Montolivo | 25 | EU | 2005 | 193 | 13 | 2012 | €5.5M | |
| 19 | DF | (Italy) | Gobbi | 29 | EU | 2006 | 103 | 2 | 2010 | €5.8M | |
| 21 | FW | (Senegal) | Babacar | 17 | Non-EU | 2008 | 5 | 2 | 2014 | Youth system | |
| 22 | MF | (Serbia) | Ljajić | 18 | Non-EU | 2010 | 10 | 0 | 2011 | €8M | |
| 23 | DF | (Italy) | Pasqual | 28 | EU | 2005 | 158 | 2 | 2013 | Free | |
| 24 | MF | (Argentina) | Santana | 28 | EU | 2006 | 104 | 12 | 2010 | €5.5M | |
| 25 | DF | (Italy) | Comotto | 31 | EU | 2008 | 63 | 0 | 2011 | €4.3M | |
| 27 | FW | (Switzerland) | Seferovic | 18 | Non-EU | 2010 | 0 | 0 | 2016 | €2M | |
| 28 | MF | (Argentina) | Bolatti | 25 | Non-EU | 2010 | 14 | 0 | 2014 | €3.8M | |
| 29 | DF | (Italy) | De Silvestri | 22 | EU | 2009 | 34 | 1 | 2013 | €5.5M | |
| 32 | MF | (Italy) | Marchionni | 29 | EU | 2009 | 39 | 7 | 2012 | €4.5M | |
| 35 | GK | (Serbia) | Avramov | 31 | Non-EU | 2008 | 6 | 0 | 2011 | €1.2M | |
| 39 | FW | (Brazil) | Keirrison | 21 | Non-EU | 2010 | 12 | 2 | 2010 | Loan | |
| 45 | MF | (Italy) | Carraro | 22 | EU | | 3 | 0 | | Youth system | |
| 90 | GK | (Italy) | Seculin | 19 | EU | 2007 | 0 | 0 | 2013 | Youth system | |

- Last updated: 1 June 2010
- Ordered by players' shirt numbers.

== Transfers ==
=== In ===
| No. | Pos. | Nat. | Name | Age | EU | Moving from | Type | Transfer window | Ends | Transfer fee | Source |
|---|---|---|---|---|---|---|---|---|---|---|---|
| 54 | DF | (Portugal) | Manuel da Costa | 39 | EU | Sampdoria | Loan end | Summer | 2013 | n/a | |
| 34 | MF | (Serbia) | Nikola Gulan | 36 | EU | 1860 Munich (Germany) | Loan end | Summer | 2010 | n/a | |
| — | FW | (Italy) | Samuel Di Carmine | 37 | EU | Queens Park Rangers (England) | Loan end | Summer | | n/a | |
| — | FW | (Italy) | Arturo Lupoli | 38 | EU | Sheffield United (England) | Loan end | Summer | 2012 | n/a | |
| — | FW | (Senegal) | Papa Waigo | 41 | Non-EU | Lecce | Loan end | Summer | 2010 | n/a | |
| 32 | RM | (Italy) | Marco Marchionni | 28 | EU | Juventus | Transfer | Summer | 2013 | €4.5M | Violachannel.tv |
| 14 | CB | (Italy) | Cesare Natali | 30 | EU | Torino | Transfer | Summer | 2012 | €2.8M | Violachannel.tv |
| 15 | CM | (Italy) | Cristiano Zanetti | 32 | EU | Juventus | Transfer | Summer | 2011 | €2M | Violachannel.tv |
| 9 | FW | (Argentina) | José Ignacio Castillo | 33 | Non-EU | Lecce | Transfer | Summer | 2011 | €0.9M | Violachannel.tv |
| 17 | MF | (Italy) | Francesco Di Tacchio | 19 | EU | Ascoli | Swap | Summer | | €2M | Violachannel.tv |
| 17 | RB | (Italy) | Lorenzo De Silvestri | 21 | EU | Lazio | Transfer | Summer | 2014 | €5.7M | Violachannel.tv |
| 7 | MF | (Germany) | Savio Nsereko | 20 | EU | West Ham United (England) | Transfer | Summer | 2014 | €3M + da Costa | Violachannel.tv |
| 16 | DF | (Brazil) | Felipe | 25 | EU | Udinese | Loan | Winter | 2010 | Loan | Violachannel.tv |
| 22 | AM | (Serbia) | Adem Ljajić | 18 | Non-EU | Partizan (Serbia) | Transfer | Winter | 2014 | €8M | Violachannel.tv |
| 28 | AM | (Argentina) | Mario Bolatti | 24 | Non-EU | Porto (Portugal) | Transfer | Winter | 2014 | €3.8M | violachannel.tv |
| 27 | FW | (Switzerland) | Haris Seferovic | 17 | Non-EU | Grasshopper Club Zürich (Switzerland) | Transfer | Winter | 2016 | €2M | violachannel.tv |

Last updated: 1 June 2010

Total spending: ▼€34.7 million + Manuel da Costa

=== Out ===
| No. | Pos. | Nat. | Name | Age | EU | Moving to | Type | Transfer window | Transfer fee | Source |
|---|---|---|---|---|---|---|---|---|---|---|
| 15 | DF | (Czech Republic) | Ondřej Mazuch | 20 | EU | Anderlecht (Belgium) | Loan | Summer | n/a | Violachannel.tv |
| 33 | DF | (Italy) | Massimiliano Tagliani | 20 | EU | Gallipoli | Loan | Summer | n/a | Violachannel.tv |
| 34 | MF | (Serbia) | Nikola Gulan | 20 | Non-EU | Empoli | Loan | Summer | n/a | Violachannel.tv |
| 27 | FW | (Italy) | Samuel Di Carmine | 20 | EU | Gallipoli | Loan | Summer | n/a | Violachannel.tv |
| 28 | FW | (Brazil) | Jefferson | 21 | EU | Frosinone | Loan | Summer | n/a | Violachannel.tv |
| 46 | FW | (Italy) | Piergiuseppe Maritato | 20 | EU | Gallipoli | Loan | Summer | n/a | Violachannel.tv |
| 13 | FW | (Senegal) | Papa Waigo | 25 | Non-EU | Southampton (England) | Loan | Summer | n/a | Tuttomercatoweb.com |
| 88 | MF | (Brazil) | Felipe Melo | 26 | EU | Juventus | Transfer | Summer | €25M | Tuttosport.com |
| 7 | MF | (Italy) | Franco Semioli | 29 | EU | Sampdoria | Transfer | Summer | €4.5M | Repubblica.it |
| 16 | FW | (Italy) | Arturo Lupoli | 22 | EU | Ascoli | Swap | Summer | Part-exchange for Di Tacchio | Violachannel.tv |
| 22 | CM | (Serbia) | Zdravko Kuzmanović | 21 | Non-EU | VfB Stuttgart (Germany) | Transfer | Summer | €8M | Violachannel.tv |
| 54 | CB | (Portugal) | Manuel da Costa | 23 | EU | West Ham United (England) | Swap | Summer | Part-exchange for Savio Nsereko | Violachannel.tv |
| 3 | CB | (Italy) | Dario Dainelli | 30 | EU | Genoa | Transfer | Winter | €2.5M | Violachannel.tv |
| 9 | FW | (Argentina) | José Ignacio Castillo | 34 | Non-EU | Bari | Transfer | Winter | Undisclosed | Violachannel.tv |
| 20 | AM | (Denmark) | Martin Jørgensen | 34 | EU | AGF (Denmark) | Transfer | Winter | Undisclosed | Violachannel.tv |

Last updated: 30 April 2010

Total income: ▲ ~€40 million

== Competitions ==
=== Overall ===
| Competition | Started round | Current position | Final position | First match | Last match |
|---|---|---|---|---|---|
| Serie A | Matchday 1 | — | 11th | 22 August 2009 | 16 May 2010 |
| Coppa Italia | Round of 16 | — | Semi-finals | 14 January 2010 | 13 April 2010 |
| Champions League | Group stage | — | Round of 16 | 18 August 2009 | 9 March 2010 |

Last updated: 16 May 2010

=== Serie A ===
==== League table ====
| Pos | Team | Pld | W | D | L | GF | GA | GD | Pts |
|---|---|---|---|---|---|---|---|---|---|
| 9 | Genoa | 38 | 14 | 9 | 15 | 57 | 61 | −4 | 51 |
| 10 | Bari | 38 | 13 | 11 | 14 | 49 | 49 | 0 | 50 |
| 11 | Fiorentina | 38 | 13 | 8 | 17 | 48 | 47 | +1 | 47 |
| 12 | Lazio | 38 | 11 | 13 | 14 | 39 | 43 | −4 | 46 |
| 13 | Catania | 38 | 10 | 15 | 13 | 44 | 45 | −1 | 45 |

Source: Lega Calcio and Yahoo! Sport
Rules for classification: 1) points; 2) head-to-head points; 3) head-to-head goal difference; 4) head-to-head goals scored; 5) goal difference; 6) number of goals scored.

==== Results summary ====
| Overall | | | | | | | | Home | | | | | | Away | | | | | |
| Pld | W | D | L | GF | GA | GD | Pts | W | D | L | GF | GA | GD | W | D | L | GF | GA | GD |
|---|---|---|---|---|---|---|---|---|---|---|---|---|---|---|---|---|---|---|---|
| 38 | 13 | 8 | 17 | 48 | 47 | +1 | 47 | 9 | 3 | 7 | 28 | 20 | +8 | 4 | 5 | 10 | 20 | 27 | −7 |

Last updated: 16 May 2010.
Source: Competitive matches

==== Results by round ====
| Round | 1 | 2 | 3 | 4 | 5 | 6 | 7 | 8 | 9 | 10 | 11 | 12 | 13 | 14 | 15 | 16 | 17 | 18 | 19 | 20 | 21 | 22 | 23 | 24 | 25 | 26 | 27 | 28 | 29 | 30 | 31 | 32 | 33 | 34 | 35 | 36 | 37 | 38 |
|---|---|---|---|---|---|---|---|---|---|---|---|---|---|---|---|---|---|---|---|---|---|---|---|---|---|---|---|---|---|---|---|---|---|---|---|---|---|---|
| Ground | A | H | H | A | H | A | H | A | H | A | H | A | H | A | H | A | H | A | H | H | A | A | H | A | H | A | H | A | H | A | H | A | H | A | H | A | H | A |
| Result | D | W | W | L | W | W | D | D | L | L | W | W | L | L | W | L | L | W | W | L | L | D | L | L | W | D | L | W | W | L | W | D | D | L | L | L | D | L |
| Position | 11 | 7 | 5 | 6 | 4 | 4 | 4 | 4 | 5 | 8 | 5 | 4 | 6 | 10 | 5 | 10 | 7 | 6 | 7 | 9 | 9 | 9 | 10 | 11 | 11 | 10 | 11 | 10 | 11 | 11 | 11 | 11 | 11 | 11 | 11 | 11 | 11 | 11 |

Updated to match(es) played on 16 May 2010. Source: Competitive matches
A = Away; H = Home; W = Win; D = Draw; L = Loss

==== Matches ====
| 22 August 2009 1 | Bologna | 1–1 | Fiorentina | Bologna |
| 18:00 CEST (UTC+02:00) | Osvaldo 24'; Britos (yellow card) 69' | Report | Montolivo (yellow card) 31'; Mutu 64'; Comotto (yellow card) 67' | Stadium: Stadio Renato Dall'Ara; Attendance: 17,244; Referee: Andrea Gervasoni |

| 30 August 2009 2 | Fiorentina | 1–0 | Palermo | Florence |
| 20:45 CEST (UTC+02:00) | Jovetić 29'; Zanetti (yellow card) 71'; Donadel (yellow card) 83' | Report | Kjær (yellow card) 53'; Miccoli (yellow card) 56' | Stadium: Stadio Artemio Franchi; Attendance: 24,576; Referee: Daniele Orsato |

| 13 September 2009 3 | Fiorentina | 1–0 | Cagliari | Florence |
| 15:00 CEST (UTC+02:00) | Montolivo (yellow card) 36'; Gilardino 55' | Report | Conti (yellow card) 50'; Astori (yellow card) 90+5' | Stadium: Stadio Artemio Franchi; Attendance: 23,176; Referee: Luca Banti |

| 20 September 2009 4 | Roma | 3–1 | Fiorentina | Rome |
| 20:45 CEST (UTC+02:00) | Totti 27' (pen.), 32'; De Rossi 41' | Report | Pasqual (yellow card) 13'; Dainelli (yellow card) 77'; Gamberini (yellow card) 82'; Gilardino 84' | Stadium: Stadio Olimpico; Attendance: 31,378; Referee: Nicola Rizzoli |

| 23 September 2009 5 | Fiorentina | 2–0 | Sampdoria | Florence |
| 20:45 CEST (UTC+02:00) | Jovetić 25'; Vargas (yellow card) 32'; Gilardino 66' | Report | Gastaldello (yellow card) 27'; Palombo (yellow card) 76' | Stadium: Stadio Artemio Franchi; Attendance: 26,307; Referee: Emidio Morganti |

| 26 September 2009 6 | Livorno | 0–1 | Fiorentina | Livorno |
| 20:45 CEST (UTC+02:00) | Tavano (yellow card) 20'; Marcus Diniz (yellow card) 75' | Report | Dainelli (yellow card) 16' (yellow-red card) 84'; Donadel (yellow card) 22'; Mutu (yellow card) 39'; Jovetić 75' (pen.) | Stadium: Stadio Armando Picchi; Attendance: 11,915; Referee: Antonio Damato |

| 4 October 2009 7 | Fiorentina | 0–0 | Lazio | Florence |
| 15:00 CEST (UTC+02:00) | | Report | Cribari (yellow card) 37'; Matuzalém (yellow card) 48'; Del Nero (yellow card) 51' | Stadium: Stadio Artemio Franchi; Attendance: 26,436; Referee: Christian Brighi |

| 17 October 2009 8 | Juventus | 1–1 | Fiorentina | Turin |
| 18:00 CEST (UTC+02:00) | Sissoko (yellow card) 1'; Amauri 19'; Grygera (yellow card) 38' | Report | Vargas 5'; Montolivo (yellow card) 37'; Gobbi (yellow card) 58' | Stadium: Stadio Olimpico di Torino; Attendance: 25,779; Referee: Nicola Rizzoli |

| 25 October 2009 9 | Fiorentina | 0–1 | Napoli | Florence |
| 15:00 CET (UTC+01:00) | Mutu (yellow card) 13'; Zanetti (yellow card) 59'; Gamberini (yellow card) 83' | Report | Grava (yellow card) 34'; Aronica (yellow card) 44'; Contini (yellow card) 57'; Rinaudo (yellow card) 81'; Maggio 88' | Stadium: Stadio Artemio Franchi; Attendance: 26,864; Referee: Emidio Morganti |

| 28 October 2009 10 | Genoa | 2–1 | Fiorentina | Genoa |
| 20:45 CET (UTC+01:00) | Biava (yellow card) 27'; Palladino 43'; Bocchetti (yellow card) 62'; Mesto 73' | Report | Jovetić (yellow card) 45+1'; Marchionni 63' | Stadium: Stadio Luigi Ferraris; Attendance: 25,778; Referee: Massimiliano Saccani |

| 1 November 2009 11 | Fiorentina | 3–1 | Catania | Florence |
| 15:00 CET (UTC+01:00) | Marchionni 5', 69'; Dainelli (yellow card) 32' (yellow-red card) 45'; Krøldrup (yellow card) 72'; Gilardino 86' | Report | Carboni (yellow card) 43'; Mascara 48', (yellow card) 49'; Silvestre (yellow card) 50'; Capuano (yellow card) 52' (yellow-red card) 58' | Stadium: Stadio Artemio Franchi; Attendance: 23,975; Referee: Paolo Tagliavento |

| 8 November 2009 12 | Udinese | 0–1 | Fiorentina | Udine |
| 15:00 CET (UTC+01:00) | Zapata (yellow card) 83'; Coda (yellow card) 86'; Di Natale (yellow card) 88' | Report | Montolivo (yellow card) 18'; Comotto (yellow card) 44'; Castillo (yellow card) 62'; Vargas 84'; Marchionni (yellow card) 87' | Stadium: Stadio Friuli; Attendance: 17,736; Referee: Carmine Russo |

| 21 November 2009 13 | Fiorentina | 2–3 | Parma | Florence |
| 20:45 CET (UTC+01:00) | Pasqual (yellow card) 35'; Zanetti (yellow card) 40'; Gilardino 26', 62'; Donadel (yellow card) 82' (yellow-red card) 86' | Report | Amoruso 30', (yellow card) 53'; Bojinov 52'; Galloppa (yellow card) 59'; Lanzafame 68'; Džemaili (yellow card) 90+3'; Dellafiore (yellow card) 90+5' | Stadium: Stadio Artemio Franchi; Attendance: 25,086; Referee: Daniele Orsato |

| 29 November 2009 14 | Internazionale | 1–0 | Fiorentina | Milan |
| 15:00 CET (UTC+01:00) | Chivu (yellow card) 33'; Samuel (yellow card) 80'; Milito 84' (pen.) | Report | Gobbi (yellow card) 35'; Krøldrup (yellow card) 42'; Zanetti (yellow card) 67'; Comotto (yellow card) 84' | Stadium: San Siro; Attendance: 59,471; Referee: Antonio Damato |

| 6 December 2009 15 | Fiorentina | 2–0 | Atalanta | Florence |
| 15:00 CET (UTC+01:00) | Vargas 26'; De Silvestri (yellow card) 28'; Gilardino 89' | Report | Manfredini (yellow card) 44'; Valdés (yellow card) 82' (yellow-red card) 84' | Stadium: Stadio Artemio Franchi; Attendance: 24,671; Referee: Domenico Celi |

| 13 December 2009 16 | Chievo | 2–1 | Fiorentina | Verona |
| 15:00 CET (UTC+01:00) | Pinzi 12', (yellow card) 17'; Sardo 24', (yellow card) 24'; Morero (yellow card) 29' | Report | Montolivo 5', (yellow card) 26'; Gilardino (yellow card) 28'; Santana (yellow card) 58' | Stadium: Stadio Marc'Antonio Bentegodi; Attendance: 10,508; Referee: Paolo Valeri |

| 6 January 2010 18 | Siena | 1–5 | Fiorentina | Siena |
| 15:00 CET (UTC+01:00) | Rosi (yellow card) 27'; Maccarone 84' (pen.) | Report | Krøldrup 5', (yellow card) 84'; Donadel (yellow card) 17'; Santana 28'; Pasqual (yellow card) 33'; Gilardino 36', 66'; Comotto (yellow card) 61'; Mutu 79'; Gobbi (yellow card) 88' | Stadium: Stadio Artemio Franchi – Montepaschi Arena; Attendance: 13,296; Referee: Domenico Celi |

| 10 January 2010 19 | Fiorentina | 2–1 | Bari | Florence |
| 15:00 CET (UTC+01:00) | Mutu 38'; Montolivo (yellow card) 40'; Felipe (yellow card) 48'; Donadel (yellow card) 61'; Castillo 74', (red card) 80' | Report | Parisi (yellow card) 17'; Barreto 25'; Almirón (yellow card) 33' (yellow-red card) 57'; Meggiorini (yellow card) 84' | Stadium: Stadio Artemio Franchi; Attendance: 25,972; Referee: Andrea Gervasoni |

| 17 January 2010 20 | Fiorentina | 1–2 | Bologna | Florence |
| 15:00 CET (UTC+01:00) | Mutu 51' | Report | Giménez 28'; Di Vaio 45'; Buscè (yellow card) 69'; Mudingayi (yellow card) 75' | Stadium: Stadio Artemio Franchi; Attendance: 24,913; Referee: Luca Banti |

| 24 January 2010 21 | Palermo | 3–0 | Fiorentina | Palermo |
| 15:00 CET (UTC+01:00) | Hernández 28', 37', (yellow card) 29'; Balzaretti (yellow card) 39'; Budan 59' | Report | Montolivo (yellow card) 16' | Stadium: Stadio Renzo Barbera; Attendance: 21,585; Referee: Antonio Damato |

| 31 January 2010 22 | Cagliari | 2–2 | Fiorentina | Cagliari |
| 15:00 CET (UTC+01:00) | Cossu (yellow card) 2' (yellow-red card) 51'; Conti (yellow card) 27'; Lazzari 36'; Astori 48' | Report | Marchionni 7'; Felipe (yellow card) 8'; Jovetić (yellow card) 35', (goal) 63'; Vargas (yellow card) 57' | Stadium: Stadio Sant'Elia; Attendance: 15,000; Referee: Paolo Valeri |

| 7 February 2010 23 | Fiorentina | 0–1 | Roma | Florence |
| 20:45 CET (UTC+01:00) | Marchionni (yellow card) 45'; De Silvestri (yellow card) 57' | Report | Perrotta (yellow card) 32'; Vučinić 82' | Stadium: Stadio Artemio Franchi; Attendance: 27,442; Referee: Nicola Rizzoli |

| 13 February 2010 24 | Sampdoria | 2–0 | Fiorentina | Genoa |
| 20:45 CET (UTC+01:00) | Semioli 17'; Pazzini 40' | Report | Krøldrup (yellow card) 27'; Vargas (yellow card) 81'; Felipe (yellow card) 87'; Montolivo (yellow card) 90' | Stadium: Stadio Luigi Ferraris; Attendance: 23,485; Referee: Emidio Morganti |

| 13 February 2010 25 | Fiorentina | 2–1 | Livorno | Florence |
| 15:00 CET (UTC+01:00) | Donadel (yellow card) 40'; Vargas 62'; Gilardino 78'; Felipe (yellow card) 84' | Report | Filippini (yellow card) 22'; Marchini (yellow card) 25'; Rivas 36', (red card) 66'; Mozart (yellow card) 45+1'; Moro (yellow card) 62'; Pulzetti (yellow card) 64'; Knežević (yellow card) 79' | Stadium: Stadio Artemio Franchi; Attendance: 24,997; Referee: Domenico Celi |

| 24 February 2010 17 | Fiorentina | 1–2 | Milan | Florence |
| 18:30 CET (UTC+01:00) | Gilardino 14'; Marchionni (yellow card) 20' | Report | Huntelaar 81'; Jankulovski (yellow card) 83'; Pato 90+1', (yellow card) 90+2' | Stadium: Stadio Artemio Franchi; Attendance: 38,389; Referee: Roberto Rosetti |

| 27 February 2010 26 | Lazio | 1–1 | Fiorentina | Rome |
| 20:45 CET (UTC+01:00) | Siviglia 7', (yellow card) 64'; Ledesma (yellow card) 40' | Report | Felipe (yellow card) 81'; Zanetti (yellow card) 86'; Keirrison 90+2'; Krøldrup (yellow card) 90+4' | Stadium: Stadio Olimpico; Attendance: 30,708; Referee: Andrea Romeo |

| 6 March 2010 27 | Fiorentina | 1–2 | Juventus | Florence |
| 18:00 CET (UTC+01:00) | Marchionni 32' | Report | Diego 2'; Sissoko (yellow card) 41'; Zebina (yellow card) 56'; Grosso 68'; Marchisio (yellow card) 85' | Stadium: Stadio Artemio Franchi; Attendance: 34,805; Referee: Antonio Damato |

| 13 March 2010 28 | Napoli | 1–3 | Fiorentina | Naples |
| 20:45 CET (UTC+01:00) | Pazienza (yellow card) 5'; Lavezzi 48', (yellow card) 49' | Report | Felipe (yellow card) 19'; Comotto (yellow card) 44'; Gilardino 60', 87'; Jovetić 90+5' | Stadium: Stadio San Paolo; Attendance: 31,986; Referee: Luca Banti |

| 13 March 2010 29 | Fiorentina | 3–0 | Genoa | Florence |
| 18:00 CET (UTC+01:00) | Santana 5', (yellow card) 56'; Pasqual (yellow card) 71'; Gilardino 73' (pen.); Babacar 86' | Report | Criscito (yellow card) 54'; Jurić (yellow card) 65'; Papastathopoulos (yellow card) 68' | Stadium: Stadio Artemio Franchi; Attendance: 25,543; Referee: Carmine Russo |

| 24 March 2010 30 | Catania | 1–0 | Fiorentina | Catania |
| 20:45 CET (UTC+01:00) | Mascara 2', (yellow card) 58'; Biagianti (yellow card) 59' | Report | Babacar (yellow card) 70' | Stadium: Stadio Angelo Massimino; Attendance: 14,531; Referee: Andrea Gervasoni |

| 28 March 2010 31 | Fiorentina | 4–1 | Udinese | Florence |
| 15:00 CEST (UTC+02:00) | Gobbi (yellow card) 20'; Vargas 36'; Comotto (yellow card) 44'; Zanetti (yellow card) 51'; Gilardino 57'; Santana 68'; Montolivo (yellow card) 78'; Jovetić 84' | Report | Pepe 41', (yellow card) 41'; Ferronetti (yellow card) 58' | Stadium: Stadio Artemio Franchi; Attendance: 25,418; Referee: Gabriele Gava |

| 3 April 2010 32 | Parma | 1–1 | Fiorentina | Parma |
| 15:00 CEST (UTC+02:00) | Lucarelli (yellow card) 38'; Bojinov 68'; Valiani (yellow card) 70'; Dellafiore (yellow card) 90+1' | Report | De Silvestri 22'; Zanetti (yellow card) 45+1'; Comotto (yellow card) 53'; Natali (yellow card) 65'; Krøldrup (yellow card) 77' | Stadium: Stadio Ennio Tardini; Attendance: 18,702; Referee: Andrea De Marco |

| 10 April 2010 33 | Fiorentina | 2–2 | Internazionale | Florence |
| 20:45 CEST (UTC+02:00) | Keirrison 11'; Pasqual (yellow card) 18'; Krøldrup (yellow card) 42', (goal) 82'; Natali (yellow card) 53'; Bolatti (yellow card) 78'; Gobbi (yellow card) 89' | Report | Chivu (yellow card) 38'; Milito 74'; Eto'o 81'; Muntari (yellow card) 90+3' | Stadium: Stadio Artemio Franchi; Attendance: 36,981; Referee: Mauro Bergonzi |

| 18 April 2010 34 | Atalanta | 2–1 | Fiorentina | Bergamo |
| 15:00 CEST (UTC+02:00) | Ferreira Pinto 7'; Tiribocchi (yellow card) 30', (goal) 69'; Manfredini (yellow card) 50' | Report | Bolatti (yellow card) 35'; Montolivo 75'; Gobbi (yellow card) 85' (yellow-red card) 90+2' | Stadium: Stadio Atleti Azzurri d'Italia; Attendance: 13,614; Referee: Andrea Romeo |

| 25 April 2010 35 | Fiorentina | 0–2 | Chievo | Florence |
| 15:00 CEST (UTC+02:00) | | Report | Mandelli (yellow card) 13'; Mantovani (yellow card) 34'; Pinzi (yellow card) 53'; Pellissier 54'; Sardo 74', (yellow card) 75' | Stadium: Stadio Artemio Franchi; Attendance: 26,198; Referee: Sebastiano Peruzzo |

| 1 May 2010 36 | Milan | 1–0 | Fiorentina | Milan |
| 20:45 CEST (UTC+02:00) | Ronaldinho (yellow card) 44', (goal) 78' (pen.); Ambrosini (yellow card) 49' (yellow-red card) 87'; Favalli (yellow card) 87' | Report | De Silvestri (yellow card) 43' | Stadium: San Siro; Attendance: 47,579; Referee: Carmine Russo |

| 9 May 2010 37 | Fiorentina | 1–1 | Siena | Florence |
| 15:00 CEST (UTC+02:00) | Marchionni 14'; Krøldrup (yellow card) 90' | Report | Vergassola 3'; Cribari (yellow card) 30'; Del Grosso (yellow card) 44'; Rosi (yellow card) 73'; Larrondo (yellow card) 90' | Stadium: Stadio Artemio Franchi; Attendance: 29,378; Referee: Riccardo Tozzi |

| 16 May 2010 38 | Bari | 2–0 | Fiorentina | Bari |
| 15:00 CEST (UTC+02:00) | Bonucci (yellow card) 15'; Stellini (yellow card) 16', (goal) 36'; Parisi (yellow card) 79'; Rivas 90+5' | Report | Donadel (yellow card) 35'; Felipe (yellow card) 45'; Montolivo (yellow card) 73'; Natali (yellow card) 90+1'; Gamberini (red card) 90+1' | Stadium: Stadio San Nicola; Attendance: 23,318; Referee: Angelo Giancola |

=== Coppa Italia ===
| 14 January 2010 Round of 16 | Fiorentina | 3–2 | Chievo | Florence |
| 16:00 CET (UTC+01:00) | Mutu 34', 77'; Donadel (yellow card) 40'; Montolivo (yellow card) 62'; Babacar 75' | | Granoche 7'; Bentivoglio 37'; Frey (yellow card) 54'; Ariatti (yellow card) 64'; Pinzi (yellow card) 65' | Stadium: Stadio Artemio Franchi; Attendance: 7,000; Referee: Matteo Trefoloni |

| 20 January 2010 Quarter-finals | Fiorentina | 3–2 | Lazio | Florence |
| 21:00 CET (UTC+01:00) | Mutu 9', 44'; Vargas (yellow card) 14'; Santana (yellow card) 33'; Donadel (yellow card) 51'; Krøldrup 59' | | Dabo (yellow card) 23'; Zárate 50', (yellow card) 62'; Rocchi 67'; Kolarov (yellow card) 78'; Radu (yellow card) 79'; Brocchi (yellow card) 80' | Stadium: Stadio Artemio Franchi; Attendance: 10,565; Referee: Domenico Celi |

| 3 February 2010 Semi-finals; First leg | Internazionale | 1–0 | Fiorentina | Milan |
| 20:45 CET (UTC+01:00) | Milito 34'; Lúcio (yellow card) 81' | | Pasqual (yellow card) 68'; Gamberini (yellow card) 69' | Stadium: San Siro; Attendance: 15,000; Referee: Paolo Tagliavento |

| 13 April 2010 Semi-finals; Second leg | Fiorentina | 0–1 (0–2 agg.) | Internazionale | Florence |
| 20:45 CEST (UTC+02:00) | Vargas (yellow card) 3' | | Córdoba (yellow card) 10'; Balotelli (yellow card) 28'; Motta (yellow card) 55'; Eto'o 57'; Chivu (yellow card) 59' | Stadium: Stadio Artemio Franchi; Attendance: 36,003; Referee: Nicola Rizzoli |

=== UEFA Champions League ===
==== Play-off round ====
| 18 August 2009 First leg | Sporting CP (Portugal) | 2–2 | (Italy) Fiorentina | Lisbon, Portugal |
| 20:45 CEST (UTC+02:00) | Vukčević (yellow card) 12' (yellow-red card) 59', (goal) 58'; Veloso 66' | Report | Vargas 6'; Gamberini (yellow card) 12'; Zanetti (yellow card) 15'; Dainelli (yellow card) 29'; Gilardino 79' | Stadium: Estádio José Alvalade; Attendance: 27,602; Referee: Viktor Kassai (Hungary) |

| 26 August 2009 Second leg | Fiorentina (Italy) | 1–1 (3a–3 agg.) | (Portugal) Sporting CP | Florence, Italy |
| 20:45 CEST (UTC+02:00) | Comotto (yellow card) 33'; Jovetić 54', (yellow card) 68'; Zanetti (yellow card) 60' | Report | Moutinho 35'; P. Silva (yellow card) 49'; Marques (yellow card) 70'; Caneira (yellow card) 90+2' | Stadium: Stadio Artemio Franchi; Attendance: 30,000; Referee: Howard Webb (England) |

==== Group stage ====
| Pos | Team | Pld | W | D | L | GF | GA | GD | Pts | Qualification |
|---|---|---|---|---|---|---|---|---|---|---|
| 1 | (Italy) Fiorentina | 6 | 5 | 0 | 1 | 14 | 7 | +7 | 15 | Advance to knockout phase |
| 2 | (France) Lyon | 6 | 4 | 1 | 1 | 12 | 3 | +9 | 13 | Advance to knockout phase |
| 3 | (England) Liverpool | 6 | 2 | 1 | 3 | 5 | 7 | −2 | 7 | Transfer to Europa League |
| 4 | (Hungary) Debrecen | 6 | 0 | 0 | 6 | 5 | 19 | −14 | 0 | |

Source: RSSSF

| 16 September 2009 1 | Lyon (France) | 1–0 | (Italy) Fiorentina | Lyon, France |
| 20:45 CEST (UTC+02:00) | López (yellow card) 34'; Pjanić (yellow card) 38', (goal) 76'; Toulalan (yellow card) 54' | Report | Donadel (yellow card) 40'; Gilardino (red card) 45+1'; Dainelli (yellow card) 45+1'; Gamberini (yellow card) 50' | Stadium: Stade de Gerland; Attendance: 37,169; Referee: Pieter Vink (Netherlands) |

| 29 September 2009 2 | Fiorentina (Italy) | 2–0 | (England) Liverpool | Florence, Italy |
| 20:45 CEST (UTC+02:00) | Jovetić 28', 37' | Report | | Stadium: Stadio Artemio Franchi; Attendance: 33,426; Referee: Felix Brych (Germany) |

| 20 October 2009 3 | Debrecen (Hungary) | 3–4 | (Italy) Fiorentina | Budapest, Hungary |
| 20:45 CEST (UTC+02:00) | Czvitkovics 2'; Rudolf 28', (yellow card) 28'; Bodnár (yellow card) 81'; Coulibaly 88' | Report | Mutu 6', 20'; Gilardino 10'; Donadel (yellow card) 16'; Santana 37' | Stadium: Ferenc Puskás Stadium; Attendance: 41,500; Referee: Craig Thomson (Scotland) |

| 4 November 2009 4 | Fiorentina (Italy) | 5–2 | (Hungary) Debrecen | Florence, Italy |
| 20:45 CET (UTC+01:00) | Mutu 14'; Dainelli (yellow card) 28', (goal) 52'; Montolivo 59'; Marchionni 61'; Gilardino 74' | Report | Ramos (yellow card) 27'; Rudolf 38'; Coulibaly 70' | Stadium: Stadio Artemio Franchi; Attendance: 19,676; Referee: Manuel Mejuto González (Spain) |

| 24 November 2009 5 | Fiorentina (Italy) | 1–0 | (France) Lyon | Florence, Italy |
| 20:45 CET (UTC+01:00) | Vargas 28' (pen.); Gilardino (yellow card) 32'; Dainelli (yellow card) 35'; Gobbi (yellow card) 70' | Report | Cissokho (yellow card) 21'; Pjanić (yellow card) 88'; Källström (yellow card) 90+1' | Stadium: Stadio Artemio Franchi; Attendance: 34,301; Referee: Olegário Benquerença (Portugal) |

| 9 December 2009 6 | Liverpool (England) | 1–2 | (Italy) Fiorentina | Liverpool, England |
| 20:45 CET (UTC+01:00) | Benayoun 43' | Report | Jørgensen 63'; Montolivo (yellow card) 66'; Gilardino 90+2', (yellow card) 90+3' | Stadium: Anfield; Attendance: 40,863; Referee: Damir Skomina (Slovenia) |

==== Knockout phase ====
===== Round of 16 =====
| 17 February 2010 First leg | Bayern Munich (Germany) | 2–1 | (Italy) Fiorentina | Munich, Germany |
| 20:45 CET (UTC+01:00) | Van Bommel (yellow card) 28'; Robben 45+3' (pen.); Klose (yellow card) 78', (goal) 89' | Report | Krøldrup 50'; De Silvestri (yellow card) 52'; Gobbi (red card) 73'; Marchionni (yellow card) 77'; Vargas (yellow card) 90' | Stadium: Allianz Arena; Attendance: 66,000; Referee: Tom Henning Øvrebø (Norway) |

| 9 March 2010 Second leg | Fiorentina (Italy) | 3–2 (4–4a agg.) | (Germany) Bayern Munich | Florence, Italy |
| 20:45 CET (UTC+01:00) | Vargas 28'; Krøldrup (yellow card) 39'; Jovetić 54', 64'; Felipe (yellow card) 78' | Report | Schweinsteiger (yellow card) 22'; Van Bommel 60', (yellow card) 85'; Robben 65' | Stadium: Stadio Artemio Franchi; Attendance: 42,762; Referee: Alberto Undiano Mallenco (Spain) |

== Statistics ==
=== Appearances and goals ===
| | | | | Total | | | | Serie A | | UEFA Champions League | | Coppa Italia | | |
| N | Pos. | Name | Nat. | GS | App | Gls | Min | App | Gls | App | Gls | App | Gls | Notes |
|---|---|---|---|---|---|---|---|---|---|---|---|---|---|---|
| 1 | GK | Sébastien Frey | (France) | 45 | 45 | | 4050 | 36 | | 7 | | 2 | | |
| 2 | CB | Per Krøldrup | (Denmark) | 30 | 32 | 4 | 2802 | 25 | 2 | 5 | 1 | 2 | 1 | |
| | CB | Dario Dainelli | (Italy) | 16 | 16 | 1 | 1340 | 11 | | 5 | 1 | | | Transferred to Genoa |
| 4 | CM | Marco Donadel | (Italy) | 26 | 37 | | 2311 | 28 | | 7 | | 2 | | |
| 5 | CB | Alessandro Gamberini | (Italy) | 21 | 23 | | 1749 | 18 | | 4 | | 1 | | |
| 6 | LM | Juan Manuel Vargas | (Peru) | 36 | 39 | 7 | 3168 | 29 | 5 | 8 | 2 | 2 | | |
| 7 | MF | Savio Nsereko | (Germany) | | | | | | | | | | | Loaned to Bologna |
| 8 | FW | Stevan Jovetić | (Montenegro) | 29 | 34 | 10 | 2521 | 29 | 6 | 4 | 4 | 1 | | |
| | FW | José Ignacio Castillo | (Argentina) | | 7 | 1 | 135 | 6 | 1 | 1 | | | | Transferred to Bari |
| 10 | FW | Adrian Mutu | (Romania) | 15 | 17 | 11 | 1230 | 11 | 4 | 4 | 3 | 2 | 4 | |
| 11 | FW | Alberto Gilardino | (Italy) | 41 | 45 | 18 | 3751 | 36 | 15 | 7 | 3 | 2 | | |
| 13 | FW | Papa Waigo | (Senegal) | | | | | | | | | | | Loaned to Southampton |
| 14 | CB | Cesare Natali | (Italy) | 20 | 24 | | 1841 | 17 | | 4 | | 3 | | |
| 15 | CM | Cristiano Zanetti | (Italy) | 21 | 28 | | 1790 | 23 | | 5 | | | | |
| 16 | CB | Felipe | (Brazil) | 17 | 20 | | 1480 | 18 | | 2 | | | | |
| 17 | CM | Francesco Di Tacchio | (Italy) | | | | | | | | | | | |
| 18 | CM | Riccardo Montolivo | (Italy) | 41 | 47 | 3 | 3644 | 36 | 2 | 8 | 1 | 3 | | |
| 19 | LB | Massimo Gobbi | (Italy) | 25 | 32 | | 2330 | 25 | | 4 | | 3 | | |
| | MF | Martin Jørgensen | (Denmark) | 3 | 17 | 1 | 587 | 13 | | 4 | 1 | | | Transferred to AGF |
| 21 | FW | Khouma Babacar | (Senegal) | 1 | 5 | 2 | 189 | 4 | 1 | | | 1 | 1 | |
| 22 | AM | Adem Ljajić | (Serbia) | 3 | 10 | | 365 | 9 | | | | 1 | | |
| 23 | LB | Manuel Pasqual | (Italy) | 24 | 29 | | 1949 | 21 | | 5 | | 3 | | |
| 24 | MF | Mario Santana | (Argentina) | 27 | 34 | 4 | 2000 | 26 | 3 | 5 | 1 | 3 | | |
| 25 | RB | Gianluca Comotto | (Italy) | 29 | 34 | | 2548 | 26 | | 6 | | 2 | | |
| 26 | MF | Daniel Kofi Agyei | (Ghana) | | 1 | | 42 | 1 | | | | | | |
| 27 | FW | Haris Seferovic | (Switzerland) | | | | | | | | | | | |
| 28 | MF | Mario Bolatti | (Argentina) | 11 | 14 | | 887 | 12 | | 1 | | 1 | | |
| 29 | RB | Lorenzo De Silvestri | (Italy) | 23 | 33 | 1 | 2243 | 26 | 1 | 5 | | 2 | | |
| 32 | RM | Marco Marchionni | (Italy) | 29 | 38 | 7 | 2609 | 28 | 6 | 7 | 1 | 3 | | |
| 35 | GK | Vlada Avramov | (Serbia) | 4 | 4 | | 360 | 2 | | 1 | | 1 | | |
| 39 | FW | Keirrison | (Brazil) | 2 | 12 | 2 | 293 | 10 | 2 | 1 | | 1 | | |
| 45 | MF | Federico Carraro | (Italy) | | 3 | | 51 | 1 | | | | 2 | | |
| 90 | GK | Andrea Seculin | (Italy) | | | | | | | | | | | |

Last updated: 9 June 2010
Source: ESPN Soccernet
Ordered by shirt numbers
0 shown as blank

=== Goalscorers ===
| Rank | No. | Pos | Nat | Name | Serie A | Coppa Italia | UEFA CL | Total |
|---|---|---|---|---|---|---|---|---|
| 1 | 11 | FW | (Italy) | Alberto Gilardino | 15 | 0 | 4 | 19 |
| Own goal | | | | | 0 | 0 | 0 | 0 |
| Total | | | | | 48 | 6 | 21 | 75 |

Last updated: 16 May 2010
