= Prina =

Prina may refer to:

- Giuseppe Prina (1766–1814), Italian statesman
- Luca Prina (born 1965), Italian football coach
- Pier Francesco Prina (18th century), Italian artist
- Sonia Prina (born 1975), Italian operatic singer
- Stephen Prina (born 1954), American artist
- Vincenzo Prina (born 1936), Olympic Italian rower
- SS Prina, a Belgian cargo ship in service 1937-
