= Federico Carraro =

Italian footballer

Personal information
- Date of birth: 23 June 1992 (age 34)
- Place of birth: Padua, Italy
- Height: 1.78 m (5 ft 10 in)
- Position: Attacking midfielder

Team information
- Current team: Gubbio
- Number: 21

Youth career
- 2006–2011: Fiorentina

Senior career*
Years	Team	Apps	(Gls)
2009–2013	Fiorentina	1	(0)
2011–2012	→ Modena (loan)	8	(0)
2012–2013	→ Pro Vercelli (loan)	9	(0)
2013	→ Gavorrano (loan)	13	(8)
2013–2016	Pavia	72	(6)
2016–2017	Teramo	19	(1)
2017	Modena	5	(0)
2017–2019	Imolese	60	(3)
2019–2025	Feralpisalò	111	(2)
2024–2025	→ Trapani (loan)	24	(2)
2025–	Gubbio	31	(4)

International career^{‡}
2006–2008	Italy U-16	7	(0)
2008–2009	Italy U-17	7	(2)
2009	Italy U-18	4	(0)
2010–2011	Italy U-19	10	(2)
2010	Italy U-20	1	(0)
- * Club domestic league appearances and goals as of 30 April 2026 ‡ National team caps and goals as of 21 February 2013

Federico Carraro (born 23 June 1992) is an Italian footballer who plays for Serie C Group B club Gubbio as an attacking midfielder.

== Club career ==
Carraro started his career with Padova youth teams, before joining Fiorentina academy in 2006. He made his debut for the first squad of Fiorentina on 14 January 2010, when he came on as a substitute in the 81st minute for Khouma Babacar in a Coppa Italia game against ChievoVerona. On January 20, he came on as a substitute again, this time in the quarterfinal against Lazio. On 16 May 2010 he made his Serie A debut, when he came on as a substitute for Adem Ljajić in the 65th minute of the game against Bari.

The following season, he played for the first time as a starter in the Coppa Italia game against Reggina on 30 November 2010.

He moved to Serie B club Modena on loan for the 2011–12 season. On 30 August 2011 he made his debut in the home match lost 1–0 against Bari.

On 31 January 2012 he moved on loan to Pro Vercelli. On 17 July 2012 extended his contract for another year at the Serie B club.

On 11 January 2013 he moved on loan to Gavorrano.

On 24 July 2013 Pavia bought the co-ownership from Fiorentina.

On 20 June 2014, Pavia bought the other part of co-ownership from Fiorentina.

On 12 July 2019 he joined Feralpisalò on a 3-year contract. On 10 July 2024, Carraro was loaned to Trapani.

== International career ==
He represented the Italy U-17 team at the 2009 FIFA U-17 World Cup and scored 2 goals in the tournament.

== Career statistics ==
=== Club ===
As of match played 4 September 2021

Appearances and goals by club, season and competition
Club	Season	League			National Cup		Continental		Other		Total	
Club	Season	Division	Apps	Goals	Apps	Goals	Apps	Goals	Apps	Goals	Apps	Goals
Fiorentina	2009–10	Serie A	1	0	2	0	0	0	—		3	0
Fiorentina	2010–11	Serie A	0	0	1	0	—		—		1	0
Fiorentina	Total		1	0	3	0	0	0	0	0	4	0
Modena (loan)	2011–12	Serie B	8	0	2	0	—		—		10	0
Pro Vercelli (loan)	2011–12	Lega Pro 1	8	0	0	0	—		1 (Note: Appearance(s) in Promotion Playoffs)	0	9	0
Pro Vercelli (loan)	2012–13	Serie B	1	0	1	0	—		—		2	0
Pro Vercelli (loan)	Total		9	0	1	0	0	0	1	0	11	0
Gavorrano (loan)	2012–13	Lega Pro 2	13	8	0	0	—		4 (Note: Appearance(s) in Relegation Playoffs)	2	17	10
Pavia	2013–14	Lega Pro 1	30	4	0	0	—		2 (Note: Appearance(s) in Coppa Italia Serie C)	0	32	4
Pavia	2014–15	Lega Pro	23	1	0	0	—		1	1	24	2
Pavia	2015–16	Lega Pro	19	1	2	0	—		1	0	22	1
Pavia	Total		72	6	2	0	0	0	4	1	78	7
Teramo	2016–17	Lega Pro	19	1	1	1	—		2	0	22	2
Modena	2017–18	Serie C	5	0	0	0	—		0	0	5	0
Imolese	2017–18	Serie D	23	0	0	0	—		2	0	25	0
Imolese	2018–19	Serie C	37	3	2	0	—		7 (Note: Four appearances in Serie C Playoffs, three appearances in Coppa Italia Serie C)	0	46	3
Imolese	Total		60	3	2	0	0	0	9	0	71	3
Feralpisalò	2019–20	Serie C	18	0	1	0	—		3	0	22	0
Feralpisalò	2020–21	Serie C	34	1	2	0	—		4	0	40	1
Feralpisalò	2021–22	Serie C	2	0	0	0	—		1	0	3	0
Feralpisalò	Total		54	1	3	0	0	0	8	0	65	1
Career total			241	19	14	1	0	0	28	3	283	23
