= Luca Prina =

Italian football coach (born 1965)

Personal information
- Full name: Luca Prina
- Date of birth: 11 May 1965 (age 61)
- Place of birth: Biella, Italy

Managerial career
- Years: Team
- 2006–2007: Pro Belvedere Vercelli
- 2008–2009: Biellese
- 2009–2010: Canavese
- 2011–2015: Virtus Entella
- 2016: Mantova
- 2018–2019: Rezzato
- 2021–2022: Pro Patria

Luca Prina (born 11 May 1965) is an Italian football coach, last in charge as head coach of Serie C side Pro Patria.

== Career ==
Prina started his career in 2006 as head coach of Serie D amateurs Pro Belvedere Vercelli, obtaining a ninth place by the end of the season. In 2008–09 he guided Serie D club Biellese to promotion (then revoked due to financial issues involving the club). The following season, he took his first professional role as head coach at Lega Pro Seconda Divisione club Canavese.

In April 2011 he took over at another Lega Pro Seconda Divisione club, Virtus Entella. After saving the club from relegation, he guided Virtus Entella to promotion to Lega Pro Prima Divisione in 2011–12.

In 2012–13, Virtus Entella emerged as a promotion outsider, qualifying for the post-season playoffs thanks to an impressive fifth place and then being defeated by Lecce in a two-legged semi-final. This was followed by an even more successful finish in the 2013–14 Lega Pro Prima Divisione, as Virtus Entella managed to top the league for almost the full season and won promotion to Serie B for its first time ever.

As head coach of a newly promoted Serie B club, Prina was therefore successfully admitted to the yearly UEFA Pro Licence course to be held in Coverciano.

He was removed as head coach on 12 April 2015 after a negative run of results led his club into the relegation zone in Serie B.

On 14 March 2016, he was named new head coach of relegation-threatened Lega Pro club Mantova, guiding the club to retaining their professional status after playoffs. On 28 November 2016, he was sacked after a negative start to the season, with the club bottom of the league.

Prina returned to football in April 2018, as new Under-19 coach of Chievo, following Lorenzo D'Anna's promotion as head coach. He left the club in June 2018 to be replaced by Paolo Mandelli.

On 7 October 2018, he joined Serie D club Rezzato as new head coach, with 2006 FIFA World Cup winner Alberto Gilardino as his assistant. On 28 February 2019, Gilardino was promoted to head coach of Rezzato, with Prina demoted to the supervisory role.

On 22 June 2021, Prina accepted to return to management as the new head coach of Serie C club Pro Patria on a one-year contract. He was dismissed on 1 March 2022, leaving Pro Patria in the relegation zone.
