= Pier Francesco Prina =

Italian painter

Pier Francesco Prina (early 18th century) was an Italian painter. He was a native of Novara. He was living in 1718. He painted some of the decoration, along with the painter Francesco Pozzi of Valsoldo, for the Basilica of San Gaudienzo in Novara.
