= Mario Bolatti =

Argentine footballer

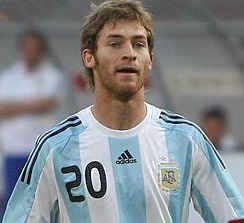
- Bolatti playing for Argentina in 2009

Personal information
- Full name: Mario Ariel Bolatti
- Date of birth: 17 February 1985 (age 41)
- Place of birth: La Para, Argentina
- Height: 1.90 m (6 ft 3 in)
- Position: Central midfielder

Team information
- Current team: Huracán (technical secretary)

Youth career
- 1996–2003: Belgrano

Senior career*
Years	Team	Apps	(Gls)
2003–2007	Belgrano	86	(1)
2007–2009	Porto	15	(0)
2009	→ Huracán (loan)	36	(5)
2010–2011	Fiorentina	22	(0)
2011–2015	Internacional	30	(1)
2013	→ Racing Club (loan)	16	(0)
2014–2015	→ Botafogo (loan)	36	(4)
2015–2017	Belgrano	33	(5)
2017–2018	Boca Unidos	18	(1)
Total		292	(17)

International career
2009–2011	Argentina	12	(1)

Managerial career
- 2021–: Huracán (technical secretary)
- * Club domestic league appearances and goals

Mario Ariel Bolatti (born 17 February 1985) is an Argentine former footballer who played as a central midfielder.

== Club career ==
Bolatti began his career in 2003 at Belgrano. In 2006, his team was promoted to the Argentine Primera División, but the club was relegated after only one season in the top flight. Bolatti was subsequently transferred to Portuguese club Porto in July 2007, where he signed a four-year contract. Porto acquired 60% of his economic rights for future transfer fees the club received while unnamed parties held the remaining 40%.

Bolatti moved on a six-month loan to Huracán for the 2009 Torneo Clausura upon recommendation from Porto teammate Lucho González. He was selected as the best player in the tournament by Argentine sports daily Olé and was a key player in Huracán's championship bid, which was thwarted by Vélez Sarsfield in the last match.

In July 2009, Porto sold all its economic rights in Bolatti (60%) to Natland Financieringsmaatschappij B.V. in order to acquire Radamel Falcao's remaining registration rights from the Dutch company. Both economic rights were valued at €1.5 million, making Bolatti's transfer value at that time worth €2.5 million in total. Porto later retained 20% of his economic rights and received €1 million only from Natland.

The retained 20% economic rights were "worth" €232,360 in accounting (as a financial asset instead of intangible asset, latter "weathered" by time), the portion of the residual (un-amortized) value of the acquisition costs that Porto paid in 2007. Porto retained the economic rights and the non-dividable registration rights to make Porto the entity to receive transfer fee for Natland and arrange a loan deal for the company. In the interim, Bolatti remained with Huracán for the 2009 Torneo Apertura.

On 18 January 2010, Bolatti was transferred to Italian Serie A club Fiorentina for €3.5 million. Porto received €500,000 for its 20% portion, but using the previous "market" value of €2.5 million as calculation.

On 6 February 2011, Bolatti joined Brazilian Série A club Internacional for €4.5 million. Two years later, and after receiving limited playing time during the previous season, Bolatti signed with Argentine side Racing Club on a six-month loan.

== International career ==
On 14 October 2009 in Montevideo, Uruguay, after coming on as a substitute, Bolatti scored the crucial goal in the 84th minute of the game which ensured Argentina's qualification to the 2010 FIFA World Cup. He was later named to Argentina's final 23-man squad by manager Diego Maradona for the tournament's final stages, in South Africa.

== After retirement ==
In March 2021, Bolatti was hired as a technical secretary at his former club Huracán.

=== International goals ===
No.	Date	Venue	Opponent	Score	Result	Competition	Ref.
1	14 October 2009	Montevideo, Uruguay	Uruguay	1–0	1–0	2010 World Cup qualification	

== Honours ==
Porto

- Primeira Liga (1): 2007–08
- Taça de Portugal (1): 2008–09

Internacional

- Campeonato Gaúcho (2): 2011, 2012
- Recopa Sudamericana (1): 2011
