= Alberto Gilardino =

Italian football manager (born 1982)

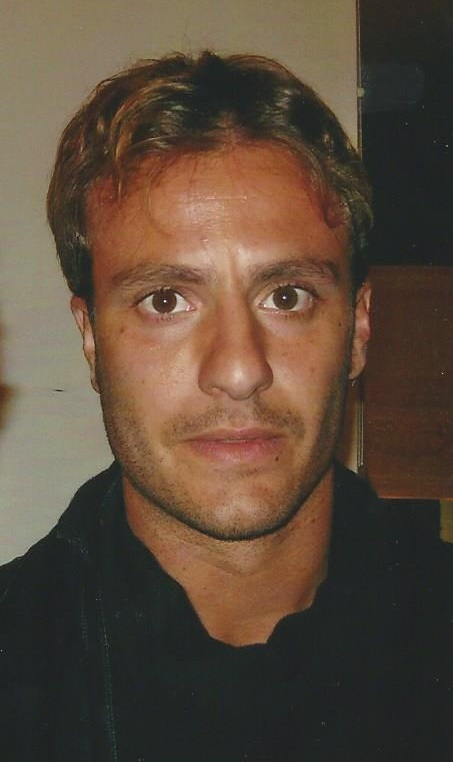
- Gilardino in 2010

Personal information
- Full name: Alberto Gilardino
- Date of birth: 5 July 1982 (age 44)
- Place of birth: Biella, Italy
- Height: 1.84 m (6 ft 0 in)
- Position: Striker

Team information
- Current team: Parma (head coach)

Youth career
- Cossatese
- 1996–1997: Biellese
- 1997–1999: Piacenza

Senior career*
Years	Team	Apps	(Gls)
1999–2000	Piacenza	17	(3)
2000–2002	Hellas Verona	39	(5)
2002–2005	Parma	96	(50)
2005–2008	AC Milan	94	(36)
2008–2012	Fiorentina	118	(48)
2012–2014	Genoa	50	(19)
2012–2013	→ Bologna (loan)	36	(13)
2014–2015	Guangzhou Evergrande	14	(5)
2015	→ Fiorentina (loan)	14	(4)
2015–2016	Palermo	33	(10)
2016–2017	Empoli	14	(0)
2017	Pescara	3	(0)
2017–2018	Spezia	16	(6)
Total		544	(199)

International career
1998	Italy U15	10	(1)
1998	Italy U16	2	(0)
1999–2000	Italy U19	3	(0)
2000–2004	Italy U21	24	(15)
2004	Italy Olympic	6	(4)
2004–2013	Italy	57	(19)

Managerial career
- 2019: Rezzato
- 2019–2020: Pro Vercelli
- 2020–2021: Siena
- 2021: Siena
- 2022–2024: Genoa
- 2025–2026: Pisa
- 2026–: Parma
Medal record
Representing Italy
Association football
FIFA World Cup
Winner	2006 Germany
Summer Olympics
Bronze medal – third place	2004 Athens
UEFA European Under-21 Championship
Winner	2004 Germany
FIFA Confederations Cup
Third place	2013 Brazil
- * Club domestic league appearances and goals

Alberto Gilardino Ufficiale OMRI (Italian pronunciation: [alˈbɛrto dʒilarˈdiːno]; born 5 July 1982) is an Italian professional football manager and a former player who played as a striker; he currently manages Parma.

In Gilardino's early career, he was compared to Filippo Inzaghi due to his opportunism, positional sense and eye for goal. Gilardino is the tenth-youngest player to have scored 100 goals in Serie A, a feat which he managed at the age of 26 years and 105 days. With 188 Serie A goals, Gilardino is currently among the top 10 all-time scorers in Serie A history. His trademark goal celebration saw him get to his knees and play an imaginary violin.

Gilardino has played for several Italian clubs throughout his career. He first came to prominence during his time at Parma due to his consistent goalscoring, which earned him the Serie A Young Footballer of the Year Award in 2004, followed by the Serie A Footballer of the Year and the Serie A Italian Footballer of the Year Awards in 2005, as well as a move to AC Milan. With Milan, he won the 2006–07 UEFA Champions League, the 2007 UEFA Super Cup and the 2007 FIFA Club World Cup. Gilardino has also played for Chinese club Guangzhou Evergrande, with whom he won the 2014 Chinese Super League.

Gilardino has represented Italy at under-19, under-20, under-21, and senior levels. Gilardino was a part of the Italian side that won the 2004 UEFA Under-21 Championship, where he became the tournament's leading goalscorer. He was also named as the best player of the tournament, and one of two strikers in the UEFA Team of the Tournament. Later that year, he also won a bronze medal with Italy at the 2004 Summer Olympics. He is the all-time top scorer of the Italy U-21 national team with 19 goals in 30 appearances. At senior level, he was part of the 2006 FIFA World Cup-winning squad, and has also participated at the 2009 FIFA Confederations Cup, the 2010 World Cup and the 2013 Confederations Cup, where he won a bronze medal. In his career Gilardino scored 432 goals.

== Club career ==
=== Early life and Piacenza ===
Resident from birth to Cossato, in the province of Biella, Gilardino started playing with Cossatese, with whom he remained until the Under-15 category of Juniors.

After another year in the youth of ASD Junior Biellese Libertas under the guidance of Luca Prina, Gilardino went to Piacenza. The coach Luigi Simoni gave him his debut in Serie A at age 17, on 6 January 2000, against AC Milan. The season ended with the Piacenza's relegation to Serie B, but Gilardino still managed to make an impact by scoring 3 goals in 17 matches.

=== Verona ===
In September 2000, "Gila", as he is often nicknamed and already considered a talent, was sold to Hellas Verona in co-ownership, for 7 billion Italian lire (€3,615,198). Despite his young age, he scored five goals in his two seasons at the club where he made 39 league appearances. Gilardino attracted Verona to sign him in full in June 2001, for 8.5 billion lire. (€4,389,884).

Gilardino was bought by Parma in a co-ownership deal during the 2001–02 season for 9.5 billion lire (€4,906,341) and loaned back to Verona. At Verona, Gilardino played two seasons under the guidance of Attilio Perotti, and then Alberto Malesani.

Gilardino was also involved in a car accident which ruled him out of the season on 28 April 2001: a truck crossed his car off the road and ended up in the river Sile, but he managed to abandon it before it sank. However, a fracture of the sternum ruled him out of the rest of the season. Gilardino, not yet 20 years old, scored 5 goals in 39 matches in two seasons at Verona.

=== Parma ===
Gilardino's career was launched on the international stage in 2002, as Parma purchased the remained 50% of his registration rights and returned Šerić to Verona. The move was strongly requested by then Parma coach Cesare Prandelli. Later, Adrian Mutu, Gilardino's teammate at Verona, was also signed, to replace the departing Marco Di Vaio. However, Mutu and Adriano started most of Parma's matches in the 2002–03 Serie A, relegating Gilardino to the substitutes' bench. Gilardino nonetheless made 24 league appearances and scored four goals, as well as one goal in the Coppa Italia.

In the 2003–04 season, Gilardino scored 23 goals in Serie A, 17 of which came in the second half of the season, also thanks to the return of Adriano to Internazionale. Gilardino's 23 goals placed him second in Serie A for the season, behind Andriy Shevchenko's 24. Gilardino also scored three goals in the UEFA Cup. The player credited his manager Cesare Prandelli for helping him to grow technically. Gilardino's success at club and U-21 level earned him a contract extension until June 2007.

In his third championship in Parma (2004–05), he repeated this feat, scoring another 23 goals in the league and finishing as the second-best scorer in Serie A once again, preceded by Cristiano Lucarelli's 24. He scored in a playoff match against Bologna, bringing his total haul to 24 goals. He also scored once in the UEFA Cup. He scored 51 goals for Parma in only 97 appearances in Serie A.

=== AC Milan ===
On 17 July 2005, Gilardino made a €25 million transfer to Milan, acquiring the number 11 shirt. He scored his first goal for the Rossoneri in a match against Sampdoria. He would finish the 2005–06 season with 17 goals in 34 Serie A appearances and two goals in three appearances in the Coppa Italia, but he failed to find his offensive form in Milan's 2005–06 UEFA Champions League campaign, going goal-less in all 12 matches.

In the 2006–07 season, Gilardino's scored his first UEFA Champions League goal on 1 November 2006, in a 4–1 win against Anderlecht. His European offensive output the next season was equally disappointing, with only two goals. However, one of his two goals helped Milan seal a decisive 3–0 win over Manchester United in the second leg of the semi-finals on 3 May 2007, which put them back into the Champions League final and set up a rematch with Liverpool. He played only two minutes as a substitute for Filippo Inzaghi in Milan's 2–1 victory.

Gilardino led Milan in 2006–07 Serie A scoring with 12 goals; no other Milan player hit double figures. At the end of the season, he revealed in an interview to feel challenged, to experience bitterness at not having played the Champions League final won by Milan, and was considering the possibility of leaving Milan. However, following a clarification with management, he decided to stay.

Gilardino contributed a brace in Milan's 5–1 defeat of Lazio on 7 October 2007 (which marked his first domestic goal following a double in Milan's 5–2 victory over Ascoli on 18 April), and likewise for his first Champions League brace netting of the season in a 4–1 victory over Shakhtar Donetsk on 24 October. In the second half of the season, Gilardino was often left on the substitutes' bench by manager Carlo Ancelotti, to be relegated to third striker behind Inzaghi and Alexandre Pato. Later, Gilardino described the last few months spent at Milan as the worst of his career, while stressing the positive aspects of his experience in Milan and his estimate for the Rossoneri.

With Milan, Gilardino was considered a strong front man who was adept at holding the ball and leading attacks.

=== Fiorentina ===
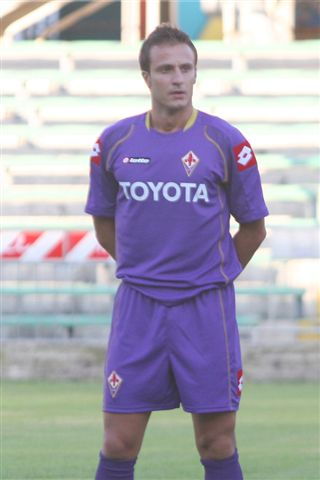
Gilardino with Fiorentina in 2008

On 25 May 2008, Fiorentina sporting director Pantaleo Corvino confirmed a deal to sign Gilardino from Milan had been completed. On 28 May, the deal was confirmed from the official website of the Rossoneri: Gilardino moved for €15 million and signed a five-year deal. At Fiorentina, Gilardino was reunited by former Parma teammates Adrian Mutu, Sébastien Frey and Marco Donadel, as well as his former manager at Parma, Cesare Prandelli.

Gilardino's first goal with the Violas was in the first leg of the third qualifying round for the 2008–09 Champions League against Slavia Prague, where he scored the second goal of the match. On 31 August, Gilardino scored on his Serie A debut against Juventus in the 89th minute to tie the match at 1–1. In the successive league match, he supplied an assist to Adrian Mutu to open the score in the match against Napoli, but Fiorentina still finished on the losing side by suffering a 1–2 defeat at the Stadio San Paolo. In the first match in the Champions League group stage, against Lyon, he scored two goals in the first half to give Fiorentina a two-goal cushion, only to be cancelled by two second-half goals from Frédéric Piquionne and Karim Benzema. On 18 October, thanks to a brace against Reggina, Gila became the seventh youngest Italian player to score 100 goals in Serie A. On 27 October 2008, Gilardino was given a two-match suspension for unsportsmanlike conduct have after scoring with his hand in Fiorentina's 3–1 victory at Palermo. The handball was not seen by referee Emidio Morganti. Gilardino insisted the handball was unintentional, claiming it was caused by defender Paolo Dellafiore.

On 25 April 2009, Gilardino scored a brace in Fiorentina's 4–1 victory against Roma, thereby scoring 100 goals in his last six years. In the same period in Europe, only Samuel Eto'o, Thierry Henry and Luca Toni scored more goals. Gilardino finished the 2008–09 season with 19 Serie A goals (all from open play), placing him in fourth place in the league scoring charts and contributing significantly to Fiorentina's fourth place in the Serie A. Among the highlights of his season was a double against Roma and an astonishing tight angle shot against Genoa while being marked by three defenders.

Gilardino had an exceptional campaign in the Champions League the following season, first scoring a dramatic late goal to give Fiorentina a 2–2 draw at Sporting CP, then against Debrecen, and then scoring in the third minute of stoppage time against Liverpool in the final match day of the group stage at Anfield, which gave Fiorentina a first-place finish at the expense of Lyon. On this occasion, Gilardino scored ten goals in European competitions for Fiorentina, equalling the record set by Gabriel Batistuta. Gilardino later said the goal at Anfield was the most important goal of his career. He ended the 2009–10 season with four goals in the Champions League and 15 in Serie A.

On 27 February 2011, Gilardino scored the ninth league goal of the season and his 200th career goal as a professional player in a match against Bari, which gave Fiorentina a 1–0 lead.(138 in Serie A, 8 in Italian Cup, 13 in the Champions League, 5 in the UEFA Cup, 17 in the senior national team, 15 in Under 21 national team, 4 in the Italian Olympic team). On 6 March 2011, Gilardino scored in Fiorentina's 3–0 victory against Catania, his 44th goal in Serie A for Fiorentina. This placed him in tenth place among the markers purple and 30th place in the scorer list of all time.

On 21 August, Gilardino scored the first goal of the 2011–12 Serie A season in the match Fiorentina against Cittadella, which ended 2–1. His first league goal of the season came in the second round against Bologna. On 17 December, he scored his second goal of the season.

=== Genoa ===
On 3 January 2012, Gilardino signed a four-and-a-half-year contract with Genoa, and cost €8 million. Gilardino chose 82 as his shirt number, as his number 11 was occupied by Boško Janković. On 29 January, during a match against Napoli, he scored his first Genoa goal, at the Stadio Luigi Ferraris. He scored his first brace for Genoa from the penalty spot at the San Siro against Internazionale in an eventual 5–4 loss. He scored his fourth goal in a 2–0 win over Palermo on 13 May, helping Genoa stay six points clear of the relegation zone.

Gilardino scored 4 goals in 14 appearances at Genoa in the second half of the 2011–12 Serie A season. Referred to the facts of Siena – Genoa 1–4 match in the 2011–2012 season ( pressure from the fans in the stadium with the players that they had to remove the mesh), 6 October 2012 federal prosecutors asked for 30 thousand euro fine for Gilardino and his other 14 teammates.

==== Loan to Bologna ====
On 31 August 2012, Gilardino switched clubs again, joining Bologna for €1.3 million loan fee. Gilardino signed a contract worth €2,341,288. He made his debut with the shirt Emilian on 1 September 2012 in the lost game against Milan, succeeding Robert Acquafresca. Gilardino netted a brace on 16 September, helping his new side overcome a 2–0 halftime deficit to defeat Roma 3–2 at the Stadio Olimpico in Rome. Gilardino scored his second brace for Bologna, in their 4–0 defeat of Catania on 30 September, bringing his goal tally to five in five games. Gilardino scored his sixth goal for Bologna on 18 November, opening the scoring in a comfortable 3–0 defeat of Palermo, earning his new club a much needed three points.

Gilardino led Bologna to a much needed win on 12 January 2013, netting a brace in the side's 4–0 defeat of Chievo Verona. He powered the club to a 1–0 defeat of Inter Milan on 10 March, scoring with a classy volley from a Diego Pérez cross, firmly establishing Bologna in mid-table and easing their relegation fears. He finished the season with 13 goals in 35 matches.

==== Return to Genoa ====
After the season at Bologna, where he dragged his team to an early salvation thanks to his 13 goals, he returned to Genoa, at the request of the former midfielder Fabio Liverani, who had become the new coach of the club. He scored his first goal of the season on 17 August against Spezia in the Italian Cup, the defeat on penalties after a 2–2 draw in regulation time accrued. He made his debut in the league in the 0–2 defeat at the San Siro against Inter and scored his first goal of the season in Serie A the following Sunday during the 2–5 home defeat against Fiorentina. On 20 October, Gilardino scored two goals in the home game against Chievo Verona in the 2–1 game won by Genoa.

On 30 October, in the 9th round of the Serie A, Gilardino scored a decisive goal that allows Genoa in front of Parma. The story is also repeated on the next match against Lazio at the Stadio Olimpico, with a penalty kick goal of doubling. On 23 November, Gilardino carries a penalty equalizer against Milan at the San Siro, coming to 6 season goals in the top flight. On 8 December, Gilardino scored the opening goal at the Stadio Sant'Elia against Cagliari Calcio in a 1–2 loss game. On 6 January 2014, he scored the eighth goal of the season on a penalty kick against Sassuolo leading Genoa to 500 victories in Serie A matches with the formula of a single round. On 26 January against Fiorentina Gilardino scored the opening goal in a thrilling 3–3 draw. On 16 February, he scored his first brace against Udinese since he returned the I Rossoblu, which led his team a 3–3 draw. With this two goals, Gilardino reaches 11 season goals and 170 total goals in Serie A, thus exceeding Giuseppe Savoldi and then temporarily ranking 14th among the Serie A all-time scorers. He finished the 2013–14 Serie A season with 15 goals in 36 matches.

=== Guangzhou Evergrande ===
On 5 July 2014, it was announced that Genoa had accepted a €5 million offer for Gilardino from Chinese side Guangzhou Evergrande. Gilardino signed a contract with the Chinese side until 31 December 2016 for an amount of 10 million. Gilardino finished his 2014 CSL season in Guangzhou with 5 goals in 14 matches, as Guangzhou won the Chinese Super League title for the fourth consecutive season.

==== Return to Fiorentina on loan ====
On 25 January 2015, Fiorentina officially announced that the club had made a deal with Guangzhou Evergrande that Gilardino would transfer to Fiorentina on loan until the end of 2014–15 season, with a reported buyout clause of €1.5 million. On 31 January, Gilardino scored in his new debut for the viola in a 1–1 draw against Genoa. On 26 April, Gilardino scored his 175th Serie A goal in a game against Cagliari. On 18 May, he scores a goal against his former team Parma in a 3–0 win of Fiorentina. He finished the second half season with 4 goals in 14 matches. At the end of the season, Fiorentina decided not to sign him and Gilardino returned to China.

=== Palermo ===
On 27 August 2015, Gilardino signed with Palermo. He made his debut for Palermo in a 2–2 draw against the Carpi on 13 September. On 4 October, Gilardino scored against Roma, ending 2–4 for the giallorossi. Gilardino scored the second goal of the season in the game against Inter Milan, making his eighth goal against the Nerazzurri. On 30 January 2016, he scored his 184th Serie A goal in a 1–1 away draw against Carpi, equalling Gabriel Batistuta as the eleventh-highest score in Serie A history. He also tied the record for the most different clubs scored against in Serie A (38), which he now holds alongside Francesco Totti and Roberto Baggio. On 15 May 2016, he scored in a 3–2 home win over Verona to help save Palermo from relegation at the conclusion of the 2015–16 Serie A season; the goal also enabled him to equal Giuseppe Signori and Alessandro Del Piero as the joint-ninth highest goalscorer in Serie A history, with 188 goals. He finished the season with 10 Serie A goals in 33 matches.

=== Empoli ===
On 7 July 2016, Gilardino signed with Empoli on a two-year contract. He spent six months at the club, making 16 appearances across all competitions and scoring one goal.

=== Pescara ===
On 9 January 2017, Gilardino joined Pescara. He only made 3 appearances for the club.

=== Spezia ===
On 3 October 2017, Gilardino signed with Spezia. He left the club by the end of the season and, on 20 September 2018, announced his retirement.

== International career ==
=== Youth career ===
Gilardino played for Italy at the 2004 Olympics in Athens, winning a bronze medal; he scored a decisive goal against Iraq in the match for third place. He also led Italy's under-21 team to victory in the 2004 UEFA European Under-21 Championship, being named the best player and top scorer of the tournament with four goals. Gilardino is currently the all-time top scorer for the Italy national under-21 team, with 19 goals in 30 matches.

=== Debut and first Lippi era ===
After the 2004 Olympics, Gilardino was chosen by the senior national team coach Marcello Lippi. He made his debut on 4 September 2004, at the age of 22, in a 2–1 home win in a World Cup qualifier against Norway. On 13 October, he scored his first international goal in a 4–3 win in a World Cup qualifier against Belarus, in Parma. Lippi considered him a starter, often in tandem with Luca Toni.

Gilardino was a member of the 23-man Italy squad that won the 2006 FIFA World Cup. He played in the first two matches, scoring a goal in his nation's second group match, a 1–1 draw against the United States, with a diving header off a free kick by Andrea Pirlo; He came on as a substitute in the semifinal match against hosts Germany, hitting the post in extra time; in the last minute of the second half of extra time, he provided the assist for Alessandro Del Piero's goal two minutes after the first goal, sealing the Azzurri's 2–0 victory, which earned them a place in the final; Italy subsequently defeated France 5–3 on penalties in the final, following a 1–1 draw after extra time.

=== Donadoni era ===
On 17 October 2007, Gilardino assumed the team captaincy for the first time in his international career after Daniele De Rossi was substituted during Italy's 2–0 friendly win over South Africa. Because of his negative 2007–08 season with the Rossoneri, which ended with a miserly 7 goals in 30 appearances, Gilardino was not selected for UEFA Euro 2008 by coach Roberto Donadoni.

=== Second Lippi era ===
Gilardino returned to the national team on 20 August 2008 following Lippi's reappointment on the Azzurri bench. He marked his return to the national side by scoring the first of Italy's two goals at the end of the first half in an international friendly against Austria, which ended in a 2–2 draw.

In June 2009, Lippi called Gilardino up for the 2009 FIFA Confederations Cup in South Africa. Gilardino played a friendly match against New Zealand in Pretoria, South Africa days before Italy's first match, netting two goals and displaying a wonderful performance. However, the Italian team was eliminated in the first round of the Confederations Cup after a loss to Brazil.

On 10 October 2009, Gilardino scored what he described at the time as the most important goal of his career, after scoring the equalising goal in the 89th minute of a 2–2 away draw against Ireland; this enabled Italy to qualify for the 2010 World Cup as group winners, to try to defend their 2006 title.

On 14 October 2009, Gilardino scored a hat-trick in the final 13 minutes of the game against Cyprus to cap a 3–2 victory for Italy, allowing the team to overturn the double disadvantage and win the game.

Gilardino was part of the Italian 2010 FIFA World Cup squad. He started Italy's first game on the group stage against Paraguay, which ended in a 1–1 draw. The tournament was a disaster for Italy and the team was eliminated in the group stage.

=== Prandelli era ===
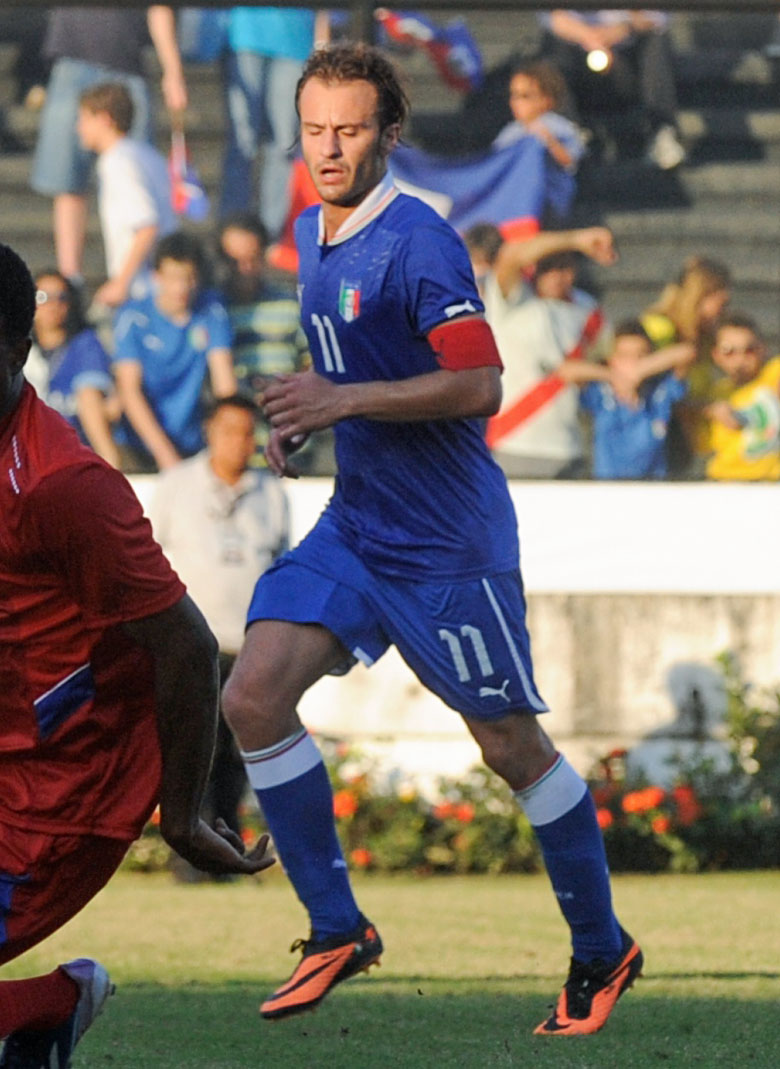
Gilardino captaining Italy in 2013 during a friendly match versus Haiti

After the embarrassment that was the 2010 World Cup, Cesare Prandelli was chosen as Italy's new coach. On 7 September 2010, Gilardino scored the first goal in the 5–0 victory against the Faroe Islands in the second qualification match for Euro 2012. On 29 March 2011, Gilardino was made captain in a friendly match between Ukraine-Italy (0–2) held in Kyiv, 30 years since a Fiorentina player (Giancarlo Antognoni) last held the Azzurri captaincy. As result of his good form after his arrival at Bologna, Gilardino was called back to the national team, alongside his teammate Alessandro Diamanti. On 7 October 2012, after an absence of over a year, Gilardino was called up again for the 2014 World Cup qualifying matches against Armenia and Denmark. On 6 February, in the friendly against the Netherlands, Gilardino came on as a sub in the final minutes, providing an assist for Marco Verratti's equaliser. On 31 May 2013, Gilardino scored a goal in Azzurri's 4–0 victory against San Marino.

After the positive performance against San Marino, Gilardino was called up for the 2013 FIFA Confederations Cup in Brazil by Prandelli on 3 June 2013. He came on for Mario Balotelli in the second half for the first group match against Mexico on 16 June. After Balotelli's injury, Gilardino took his place for all of Italy's subsequent matches, including the semi-final against Spain, and the victorious third place match against Uruguay.

On 6 September 2013, as Balotelli and Pablo Osvaldo were suspended, Gilardino made the starting eleven for the match against Bulgaria, qualifying for the 2014 World Cup, his first half goal sealing a 1–0 win for the Azzurri. This goal helped Gilardino to overtake Roberto Bettega on the all-time leading scorers' list of the Italy national team, and made him the first Genoa player to score a goal for the Azzurri since Riccardo Carapellese scored in the match against France on 12 February 1956.

== Managerial career ==
=== Rezzato ===
In September 2018, Gilardino received his UEFA A and UEFA B coaching licences. On 7 October 2018, Gilardino was named assistant coach and technical director of Serie D club Rezzato alongside head coach Luca Prina. On 28 February 2019, Gilardino was promoted to head coach of Rezzato, with Prina demoted to the supervisory role.

=== Pro Vercelli ===
On 11 July 2019, Gilardino was appointed manager of Pro Vercelli.

=== Siena ===
On 8 September 2020 he was appointed new manager of Siena, which just underwent bankruptcy and change of name and was forced to restart from Serie D. He left his job by mutual consent on 12 January 2021, with Siena in second place in the league table.

On 11 February 2021, he was re-hired as Siena head coach. He completed the season in third place and was confirmed in charge of the club following its readmission to Serie C for the 2021–22 season.

On 24 October 2021, Siena announced to have dismissed Gilardino for a second time following a lackluster start in the club's Serie C campaign.

=== Genoa ===
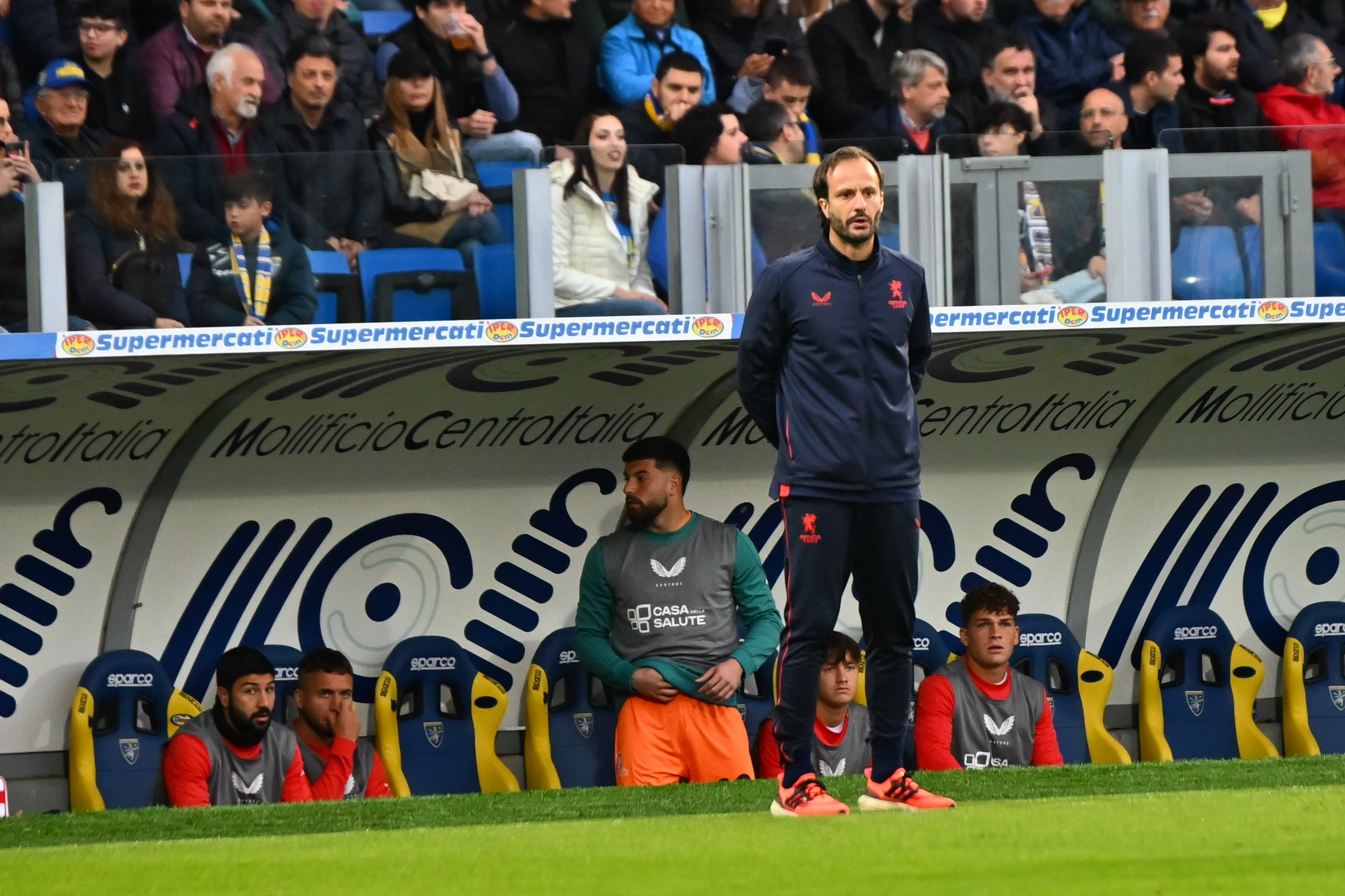
Gilardino as Genoa coach in 2023

On 1 July 2022, Gilardino was unveiled as the new head of Genoa Primavera, the Under-19 team of the Rossoblu.

On 6 December 2022, Gilardino was temporarily promoted as head coach following the dismissal of Alexander Blessin from the Serie B side. Following a positive string of results and an improvement in performances, Gilardino was permanently appointed head coach. After guiding Genoa to direct promotion to Serie A, Gilardino signed a contract extension until 30 June 2024, with an option to extend it for one further year.

On 19 November 2024, after a series of poor results and with the team on the verge of the relegation zone, Gilardino was sacked.

=== Pisa ===
On 26 June 2025, newly-promoted Serie A club Pisa announced the hiring of Gilardino on a two-year deal with a contract extension option for one further year, taking over from departing head coach Filippo Inzaghi. He was sacked on 1 February 2026 after a series of poor results and with the team in relegation zone.

== Playing style ==
Widely regarded as one of the best strikers of his generation, he was a quick and prolific forward skilled in the air, both with his head and acrobatically, due to his height. Gilardino played mainly as a striker who preferred to be served in the penalty area. This position allowed him to score goals and finish off chances by getting on the end of his teammates' crosses. Possessing good technique and an eye for goal, he is capable of shooting first time, but is also known for his ability to use his skills and strength to protect the ball and to defend himself with his back to goal; he often uses this ability to provide depth to his team, holding up the ball and subsequently laying it off for teammates, providing them with assists. Gilardino is naturally right-footed, but in his early years at Parma, he was able to improve his ability with his left foot.

== Personal life ==
Shortly after getting his drivers license in April 2001, Gilardino was driving two sisters, Silvia and Cosetta Puppinato, back to their home in Treviso when he veered his Volkswagen Golf off the road and plunged into a canal. As the car sank, and despite injuries to his vertebra, he managed to open his door and pull the sisters to safety.

Gilardino is close friends with former Milan teammate Daniele Bonera; they were also teammates at Parma. Gilardino once dedicated one of his goals to Daniele's baby daughter Talitha. Besides his goal-scoring, he is well-remembered for his goal celebration as well – getting on his knees and "playing the violin" at the touchline in front of the fans. He became engaged to Alice Bregoli on 31 March 2006 and had their first baby, a girl named Ginevra, on 2 March 2008. The couple were wed on 5 July 2009 at La Cervara Abbey in Santa Margherita Ligure, in the province of Genoa. Their second daughter, named Gemma, was born on 19 March 2011, while their third daughter, Giulia, was born on 4 September 2012.

== Career statistics ==
=== Club ===
Appearances and goals by club, season and competition
Club	Season	League			National cup (Note: Includes Coppa Italia, Chinese FA Cup)		Continental		Other		Total	
Club	Season	Division	Apps	Goals	Apps	Goals	Apps	Goals	Apps	Goals	Apps	Goals
Piacenza	1999–2000	Serie A	17	3	0	0	–		–		17	3
Piacenza	2000–01	Serie A	0	0	3	2	–		–		3	2
Piacenza	Total		17	3	3	2	–		–		20	5
Verona	2000–01	Serie A	22	3	–		–		2 (Note: Appearances in Serie A relegation tie-breaker)	0	24	3
Verona	2001–02	Serie A	17	2	2	1	–		–		19	3
Verona	Total		39	5	2	1	–		2	0	43	6
Parma	2002–03	Serie A	24	4	2	1	2 (Note: Appearances in UEFA Cup)	0	–		28	5
Parma	2003–04	Serie A	34	23	2	0	4	3	–		40	26
Parma	2004–05	Serie A	38	23	1	0	8	1	1 (Note: Appearance in Serie A relegation play-offs)	1	48	25
Parma	Total		96	50	5	1	14	4	1	1	116	56
AC Milan	2005–06	Serie A	34	17	3	2	10 (Note: Appearances in UEFA Champions League)	0	–		47	19
AC Milan	2006–07	Serie A	30	12	4	2	11	2	–		45	16
AC Milan	2007–08	Serie A	30	7	1	0	7	2	2 (Note: One appearance in UEFA Super Cup, one appearance in FIFA Club World Cup)	0	40	9
AC Milan	Total		94	36	8	4	28	4	2	0	132	44
Fiorentina	2008–09	Serie A	35	19	1	0	10 (Note: Eight appearances and five goals in UEFA Champions League, two appearances and one goal in UEFA Cup)	6	–		46	25
Fiorentina	2009–10	Serie A	36	15	3	0	9	4	–		48	19
Fiorentina	2010–11	Serie A	35	12	1	0	–		–		36	12
Fiorentina	2011–12	Serie A	12	2	1	1	–		–		13	3
Fiorentina	Total		118	48	6	1	19	10	–		143	59
Genoa	2011–12	Serie A	14	4	–		–		–		14	4
Genoa	2012–13	Serie A	0	0	1	1	–		–		1	1
Genoa	2013–14	Serie A	36	15	1	1	–		–		37	16
Genoa	Total		50	19	2	2	–		–		52	21
Bologna (loan)	2012–13	Serie A	36	13	1	0	–		–		37	13
Guangzhou Evergrande	2014	Chinese Super League	14	5	1	1	2 (Note: Appearances in AFC Champions League)	0	–		17	6
Fiorentina (loan)	2014–15	Serie A	14	4	0	0	0	0	–		14	4
Palermo	2015–16	Serie A	33	10	1	1	–		–		34	11
Empoli	2016–17	Serie A	14	0	2	1	–		–		16	1
Pescara	2016–17	Serie A	3	0	–		–		–		3	0
Spezia	2017–18	Serie B	16	6	0	0	–		–		16	6
Career total			544	199	31	14	63	18	5	1	643	232

=== International ===
Appearances and goals by national team and year
National team	Year	Apps	Goals
Italy	2004	4	1
Italy	2005	8	4
Italy	2006	11	4
Italy	2007	2	0
Italy	2008	5	1
Italy	2009	9	6
Italy	2010	6	1
Italy	2011	2	0
Italy	2012	0	0
Italy	2013	10	2
Total		57	19

Scores and results list Italy's goal tally first, score column indicates score after each Gilardino goal.

List of international goals scored by Alberto Gilardino
No.	Date	Venue	Opponent	Score	Result	Competition
1	13 October 2004	Stadio Ennio Tardini, Parma, Italy	Belarus	4–2	4–3	2006 FIFA World Cup qualification
2	9 February 2005	Stadio Sant'Elia, Cagliari, Italy	Russia	1–0	2–0	Friendly
3	17 August 2005	Lansdowne Road, Dublin, Ireland	Republic of Ireland	2–0	2–1	Friendly
4	12 October 2005	Stadio Via del mare, Lecce, Italy	Moldova	2–1	2–1	2006 FIFA World Cup qualification
5	12 November 2005	Amsterdam ArenA Amsterdam, Netherlands	Netherlands	1–1	3–1	Friendly
6	1 March 2006	Stadio Artemio Franchi, Florence, Italy	Germany	1–0	4–1	Friendly
7	30 April 2006	Stade de Genève, Geneva, Switzerland	Switzerland	1–0	1–1	Friendly
8	17 June 2006	Fritz-Walter-Stadion, Kaiserslautern, Germany	United States	1–0	1–1	2006 FIFA World Cup
9	6 September 2006	Stade de France, Saint-Denis, France	France	1–2	1–3	UEFA Euro 2008 qualification
10	20 August 2008	Stade du Ray, Nice, France	Austria	1–2	2–2	Friendly
11	10 June 2009	Atteridgeville Super Stadium, Pretoria, South Africa	New Zealand	1–1	4–3	Friendly
12	10 June 2009	Atteridgeville Super Stadium, Pretoria, South Africa	New Zealand	2–2	4–3	Friendly
13	10 October 2009	Croke Park, Dublin, Ireland	Republic of Ireland	2–2	2–2	2010 FIFA World Cup qualification
14	14 October 2009	Stadio Ennio Tardini, Parma, Italy	Cyprus	1–2	3–2	2010 FIFA World Cup qualification
15	14 October 2009	Stadio Ennio Tardini, Parma, Italy	Cyprus	2–2	3–2	2010 FIFA World Cup qualification
16	14 October 2009	Stadio Ennio Tardini, Parma, Italy	Cyprus	3–2	3–2	2010 FIFA World Cup qualification
17	7 September 2010	Stadio Artemio Franchi, Florence, Italy	Faroe Islands	1–0	5–0	UEFA Euro 2012 qualification
18	31 May 2013	Stadio Renato Dall'Ara, Bologna, Italy	San Marino	2–0	4–0	Friendly
19	6 September 2013	Stadio Renzo Barbera, Palermo, Italy	Bulgaria	1–0	1–0	2014 FIFA World Cup qualification

== Managerial statistics ==
As of match played 21 November 2026

Team	From	To	Record				
Team	From	To	G	W	D	L	Win %
Rezzato	28 February 2019	30 June 2019	10	6	0	4	60.00
Pro Vercelli	11 July 2019	30 June 2020	30	9	10	11	30.00
Siena	8 September 2020	11 January 2021	9	5	2	2	55.56
Siena	11 February 2021	24 October 2021	32	13	10	9	40.63
Genoa	6 December 2022	19 November 2024	79	32	24	23	40.51
Pisa	26 June 2025	1 February 2026	25	1	12	12	4.00
Parma	29 September 2026	present	7	1	1	5	14.29
Total			192	67	59	66	34.90

== Honours ==
AC Milan

- UEFA Champions League: 2006–07
- UEFA Super Cup: 2007
- FIFA Club World Cup: 2007

Guangzhou Evergrande

- Chinese Super League: 2014

Italy U21

- UEFA European Under-21 Championship: 2004

Italy U23

- Olympic Bronze Medal: 2004

Italy

- FIFA World Cup: 2006
- FIFA Confederations Cup third place: 2013

Individual

- Serie A Footballer of the Year: 2005
- Serie A Italian Footballer of the Year: 2005
- Serie A Young Footballer of the Year: 2004
- UEFA European Under-21 Championship Golden Player: 2004
- UEFA European Under-21 Championship top scorer: 2004

Orders

- 5th Class / Knight: Cavaliere Ordine al Merito della Repubblica Italiana: 2004
- 4th Class / Officer: Ufficiale Ordine al Merito della Repubblica Italiana: 2006
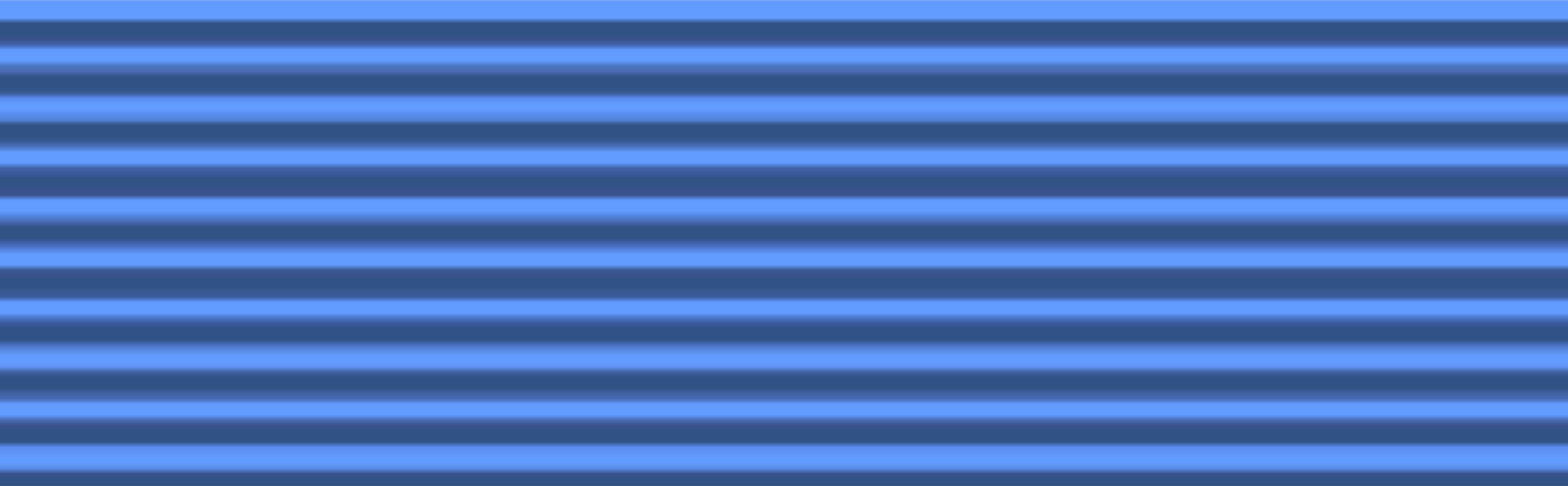
- CONI: Golden Collar of Sports Merit: 2006
