= 2012 Supercoppa Italiana =

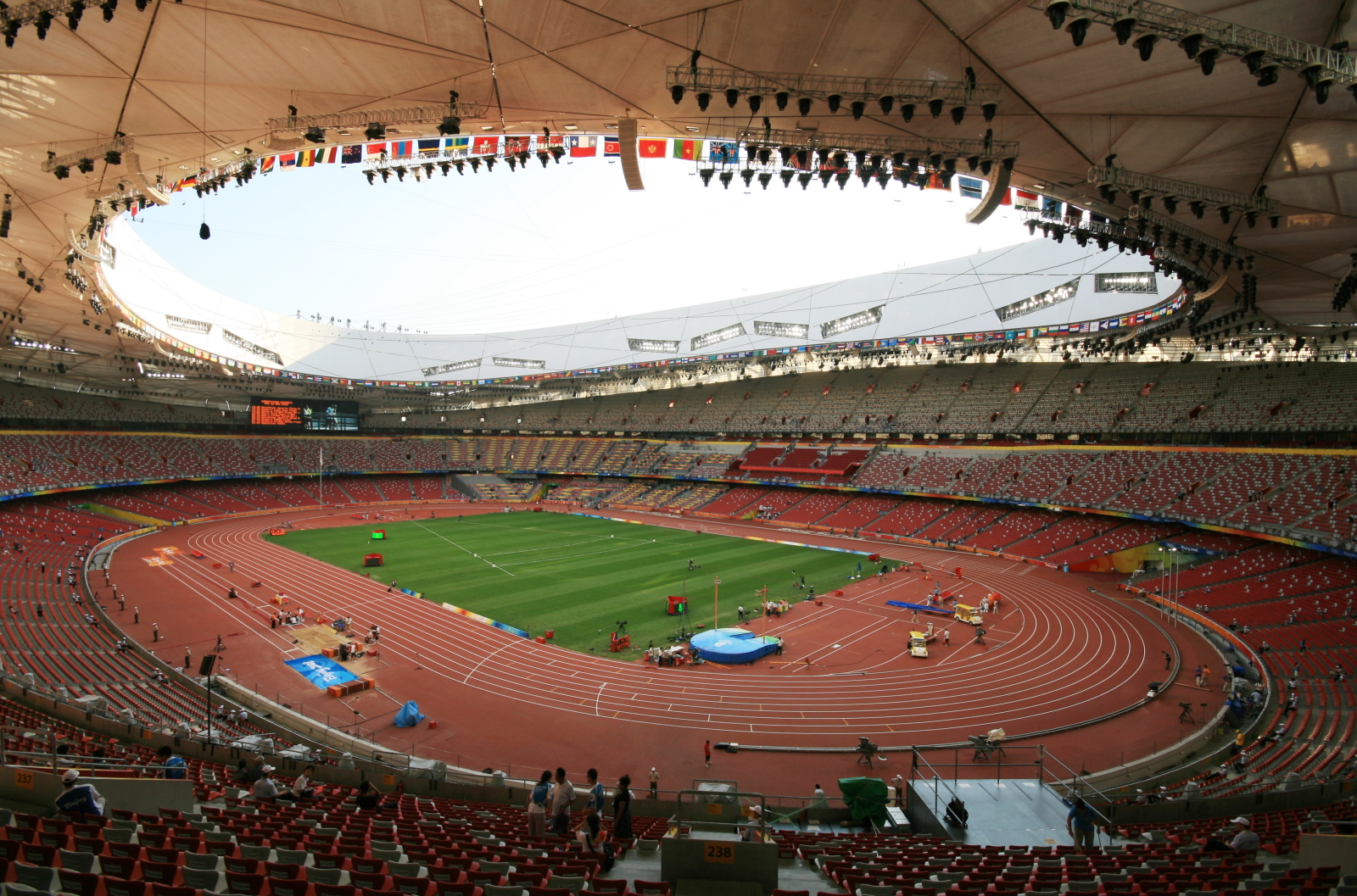
- Bird's Nest Stadium
Juventus	Napoli
Serie A	Coppa Italia
4	2
- After extra time
- Date: 11 August 2012
- Venue: Beijing National Stadium, Beijing
- Referee: Paolo Silvio Mazzoleni
- Attendance: 75,000

The 2012 TIM Supercoppa Italiana Final was the 25th edition of the Supercoppa, an annual football match contested by the winners of the previous season's Serie A and Coppa Italia competitions. It was the third instance in four years that the match took place in China, where it has an increasing fanbase in Italian football.

Juventus qualified to take part by winning the 2011–12 Serie A title, while Napoli qualified by winning the 2012 Coppa Italia Final.

Juventus won the game 4–2 after extra time.

== Details ==
11 August 2012
20:00 UTC+08:00

Juventus	4–2 (a.e.t.)	Napoli
Asamoah 37'; Vidal 74' (pen.); Maggio 97' (o.g.); Vučinić 101'	Report	Cavani 27'; Pandev 41'

Beijing National Stadium, Beijing (China PR)
Attendance: 75,000
Referee: Paolo Silvio Mazzoleni

Juventus	Napoli

JUVENTUS:
GK	1	(Italy) Gianluigi Buffon (c)
CB	2	(Brazil) Lúcio
CB	19	(Italy) Leonardo Bonucci	(yellow card) 112'
CB	15	(Italy) Andrea Barzagli
RM	26	(Switzerland) Stephan Lichtsteiner	(yellow card) 78'	(substituted off) 89'
CM	23	(Chile) Arturo Vidal
CM	21	(Italy) Andrea Pirlo
CM	8	(Italy) Claudio Marchisio
LM	22	(Ghana) Kwadwo Asamoah
CF	32	(Italy) Alessandro Matri		(substituted off) 46'
CF	12	(Italy) Sebastian Giovinco	(yellow card) 90+3'	(substituted off) 117'
Substitutes:
GK	30	(Italy) Marco Storari
DF	11	(Italy) Paolo De Ceglie
MF	20	(Italy) Simone Padoin		(substituted on) 89'
MF	24	(Italy) Emanuele Giaccherini		(substituted on) 117'
MF	39	(Italy) Luca Marrone
FW	9	(Montenegro) Mirko Vučinić		(substituted on) 46'
FW	27	(Italy) Fabio Quagliarella
Manager:
(Italy) Massimo Carrera

NAPOLI:
GK	1	(Italy) Morgan De Sanctis
CB	14	(Argentina) Hugo Campagnaro
CB	28	(Italy) Paolo Cannavaro (c)	(yellow card) 52'	(substituted off) 62'
CB	5	(Uruguay) Miguel Britos	(yellow card) 32'
RM	11	(Italy) Christian Maggio
CM	85	(Switzerland) Valon Behrami	(yellow card) 53'
CM	88	(Switzerland) Gökhan Inler		(substituted off) 106'
CM	17	(Slovakia) Marek Hamšík		(substituted off) 68'
LM	18	(Colombia) Juan Zúñiga	(yellow card) 78' (yellow-red card) 90+3'
AM	19	(North Macedonia) Goran Pandev	(red card) 85'
CF	7	(Uruguay) Edinson Cavani	(yellow card) 64'
Substitutes:
GK	22	(Italy) Antonio Rosati
DF	6	(Italy) Salvatore Aronica
DF	8	(Italy) Andrea Dossena		(substituted on) 106'
DF	21	(Argentina) Federico Fernández		(substituted on) 62'
MF	23	(Uruguay) Walter Gargano		(substituted on) 68'
FW	9	(Chile) Eduardo Vargas
FW	24	(Italy) Lorenzo Insigne
Manager:
(Italy) Walter Mazzarri				(red card) 90+3'

MAN OF THE MATCH

MATCH OFFICIALS

- Assistant referees: Renato Faverani, Andrea Edoardo Stefani
- Fourth official: Paolo Bergonzi

MATCH RULES

- 90 minutes (two halves of 45 minutes each).
- 30 minutes of extra-time (two halves of 15 minutes each) if necessary.
- Penalty shoot-out if scores still level.
- Seven named substitutes.
- Maximum of three substitutions.

== See also ==
- 2012–13 Serie A
- 2012–13 Coppa Italia
- 2012–13 Juventus FC season
- 2012–13 SSC Napoli season
- Juventus FC–SSC Napoli rivalry

Played between same clubs:

- 1990 Supercoppa Italiana
- 2014 Supercoppa Italiana
- 2020 Supercoppa Italiana
