= 2012–13 SSC Napoli season =

Napoli
2012–13 season
- Chairman: Aurelio De Laurentiis
- Manager: Walter Mazzarri
- Stadium: Stadio San Paolo
- Serie A: 2nd
- Coppa Italia: Round of 16
- UEFA Europa League: Round of 32
- Supercoppa Italiana: Runners-up
- Top goalscorer: League: Edinson Cavani (29); All: Edinson Cavani (38)
- Highest home attendance: 58,143 vs Juventus (1 March 2013, Serie A)
- Lowest home attendance: 9,434 vs PSV Eindhoven (6 December 2012, Europa League)
- Average home league attendance: 39,636
Home colours	Away colours	Third colours

The 2012–13 season saw Società Sportiva Calcio Napoli compete in Serie A, UEFA Europa League and Coppa Italia. In December 2012, Napoli were docked two points for two of their players not reporting plans to fix matches in 2010. About a month later, however, Napoli won their appeal against the ban and the punishments were overturned.

== Players ==
=== Squad information ===
As of 31 August 2012

Note: Flags indicate national team as defined under FIFA eligibility rules; some limited exceptions apply. Players may hold more than one non-FIFA nationality.

No.	Pos.	Nation	Player
1	GK	ITA	Morgan De Sanctis
2	DF	ITA	Gianluca Grava (vice-captain)
3	DF	BRA	Bruno Uvini
4	MF	ITA	Marco Donadel
5	DF	URU	Miguel Britos
6	DF	ITA	Salvatore Aronica
7	FW	URU	Edinson Cavani
8	DF	ITA	Andrea Dossena
9	FW	CHI	Eduardo Vargas
11	DF	ITA	Christian Maggio
12	GK	ITA	Diamante Crispino
13	MF	MAR	Omar El Kaddouri
14	DF	ARG	Hugo Campagnaro
15	GK	ITA	Roberto Colombo
16	DF	ITA	Giandomenico Mesto

No.	Pos.	Nation	Player
17	MF	SVK	Marek Hamšík (vice-captain)
18	DF	COL	Camilo Zúñiga
19	FW	MKD	Goran Pandev
20	MF	SUI	Blerim Džemaili
21	DF	ARG	Federico Fernández
22	GK	ITA	Antonio Rosati
24	FW	ITA	Lorenzo Insigne
28	DF	ITA	Paolo Cannavaro (captain)
33	DF	ITA	Leandro Rinaudo
55	DF	ITA	Alessandro Gamberini
85	MF	SUI	Valon Behrami
86	FW	HUN	Soma Novothny
88	MF	SUI	Gökhan Inler
94	MF	ITA	Giuseppe Fornito

== Competitions ==
=== Supercoppa Italiana ===
11 August 2012	Juventus	4–2 (a.e.t.)	Napoli	Beijing, China
14:00 CEST (UTC+02:00)	Asamoah 37'; Vidal 73' (pen.); Lichtsteiner (yellow card) 76'; Giovinco (yellow card) 90+2'; Maggio 97' (o.g.); Vučinić 102'; Bonucci (yellow card) 112'	report	Cavani 27', (yellow card) 64'; Britos (yellow card) 32'; Pandev 44', (red card) 85'; Cannavaro (yellow card) 52'; Behrami (yellow card) 53'; Zúñiga (yellow card) 76' (yellow-red card) 90+3'	Stadium: Beijing National Stadium; Attendance: 65,000; Referee: Paolo Silvio Mazzoleni

=== Serie A ===
==== League table ====
Pos	Team	Pld	W	D	L	GF	GA	GD	Pts	Qualification or relegation
1	Juventus (C)	38	27	6	5	71	24	+47	87	Qualification for the Champions League group stage
2	Napoli	38	23	9	6	73	36	+37	78	Qualification for the Champions League group stage
3	Milan	38	21	9	8	67	39	+28	72	Qualification for the Champions League play-off round
4	Fiorentina	38	21	7	10	72	44	+28	70	Qualification for the Europa League play-off round
5	Udinese	38	18	12	8	59	45	+14	66	Qualification for the Europa League third qualifying round

Source: Serie A, Soccerway
Rules for classification: 1st points; 2nd head-to-head points; 3rd head-to-head goal difference; 4th goal difference; 5th number of goals scored; 6th public draw.
(Head-to-head record is applied for clubs with the same number of points only once all matches between said clubs have been played)
(C) Champions

==== Results summary ====
Overall								Home						Away					
Pld	W	D	L	GF	GA	GD	Pts	W	D	L	GF	GA	GD	W	D	L	GF	GA	GD
38	23	9	6	73	36	+37	78	14	4	1	44	18	+26	9	5	5	29	18	+11

Last updated: 19 May 2013.
Source: Competitive matches

==== Results by round ====
Round	1	2	3	4	5	6	7	8	9	10	11	12	13	14	15	16	17	18	19	20	21	22	23	24	25	26	27	28	29	30	31	32	33	34	35	36	37	38
Ground	A	H	H	A	H	A	H	A	H	A	H	A	H	A	H	A	H	A	H	H	A	A	H	A	H	A	H	A	H	A	H	A	H	A	H	A	H	A
Result	W	W	W	D	W	W	W	L	W	L	D	W	D	W	W	L	L	W	W	W	D	W	W	D	D	D	D	L	W	W	W	D	W	W	W	W	W	L
Position	2	2	2	2	2	2	2	2	2	3	3	3	3	2	2	3	5	5	3	2	2	2	2	2	2	2	2	2	2	2	2	2	2	2	2	2	2	2

Updated to match(es) played on 19 May 2013. Source: Competitive matches
A = Away; H = Home; W = Win; D = Draw; L = Loss

==== Matches ====
26 August 2012 1	Palermo	0–3	Napoli	Palermo
20:45 CEST (UTC+02:00)	Von Bergen (yellow card) 44'; Bertolo (yellow card) 48'; Barreto (yellow card) 62'	Report	Hamšík 45+3'; Aronica (yellow card) 63'; Maggio 79'; Britos (yellow card) 81'; Cavani 88'; De Sanctis (yellow card) 90+2'	Stadium: Stadio Renzo Barbera; Attendance: 20,763; Referee: Daniele Orsato

2 September 2012 2	Napoli	2–1	Fiorentina	Naples
20:45 CEST (UTC+02:00)	Cavani (yellow card) 44'; Hamšík 55'; Džemaili 75'; Cannavaro (yellow card) 81'	Report	Roncaglia (yellow card) 38'; Tomović (yellow card) 57'; Jovetić 87'	Stadium: Stadio San Paolo; Attendance: 32,286; Referee: Antonio Damato

16 September 2012 3	Napoli	3–1	Parma	Naples
15:00 CEST (UTC+02:00)	Cavani 3' (pen.); Pandev 39'; Inler (yellow card) 52'; Insigne 77'	Report	Mirante (yellow card) 2'; Galloppa (yellow card) 42'; Parolo 44'; Rosi (yellow card) 51'; Valdés (yellow card) 55'	Stadium: Stadio San Paolo; Attendance: 31,133; Referee: Andrea Gervasoni

23 September 2012 4	Catania	0–0	Napoli	Catania
15:00 CEST (UTC+02:00)	Álvarez (red card) 2'; Bergessio (yellow card) 8'; Legrottaglie (yellow card) 59'; Almirón (yellow card) 62'	Report	Zúñiga (yellow card) 6'; Inler (yellow card) 16'; Aronica (yellow card) 64'; Vargas (yellow card) 73'	Stadium: Stadio Angelo Massimino; Referee: Mauro Bergonzi

26 September 2012 5	Napoli	3–0	Lazio	Naples
20:45 CEST (UTC+02:00)	Cannavaro (yellow card) 12'; Cavani 19', 31', 64'; Pandev (yellow card) 53'; Vargas (yellow card) 87'	Report	Cavanda (yellow card) 6'; Konko (yellow card) 25'; Hernanes (yellow card) 45+3'	Stadium: Stadio San Paolo; Attendance: 34,433; Referee: Luca Banti

30 September 2012 6	Sampdoria	0–1	Napoli	Genoa
15:00 CEST (UTC+02:00)	Berardi (yellow card) 34'; Obiang (yellow card) 41'; Gastaldello (yellow card) 57' (yellow-red card) 67'; Costa (yellow card) 58'	Report	Behrami (yellow card) 37'; Cavani 68' (pen.); Cannavaro (yellow card) 89'; Insigne (yellow card) 90'	Stadium: Stadio Luigi Ferraris; Attendance: 24,702; Referee: Paolo Tagliavento

7 October 2012 7	Napoli	2–1	Udinese	Naples
20:45 CEST (UTC+02:00)	Hamšík (yellow card) 27', (goal) 30'; Pandev 45+1'; Maggio (yellow card) 83'	Report	Pinzi 43'; Danilo (yellow card) 70'; Maicosuel (yellow card) 74'; Benatia (yellow card) 77'	Stadium: Stadio San Paolo; Attendance: 43,148; Referee: Daniele Doveri

20 October 2012 8	Juventus	2–0	Napoli	Turin
18:00 CEST (UTC+02:00)	Vidal (yellow card) 30'; Chiellini (yellow card) 64'; Barzagli (yellow card) 69'; Cáceres 80', (yellow card) 80'; Pogba 82'	Report	Cavani (yellow card) 30'; Campagnaro (yellow card) 64'; Inler (yellow card) 90'	Stadium: Juventus Stadium; Attendance: 40,562; Referee: Antonio Damato

28 October 2012 9	Napoli	1–0	Chievo	Naples
20:45 CET (UTC+01:00)	Hamšík 58'; Vargas (yellow card) 90+2'	Report	Andreolli (yellow card) 13'; Rigoni (yellow card) 20'; Vacek (yellow card) 67' (yellow-red card) 77'	Stadium: Stadio San Paolo; Attendance: 34,953; Referee: Domenico Celi

31 October 2012 10	Atalanta	1–0	Napoli	Bergamo
20:45 CET (UTC+01:00)	Carmona 19', (yellow card) 43'; Cazzola (yellow card) 30'	Report	Cannavaro (yellow card) 28'; Pandev (yellow card) 34'; De Sanctis (yellow card) 81'	Stadium: Stadio Atleti Azzurri d'Italia; Attendance: 14,883; Referee: Daniele Orsato

4 November 2012 11	Napoli	1–1	Torino	Naples
15:00 CET (UTC+01:00)	Cavani 6'; Džemaili (yellow card) 19'; Behrami (yellow card) 81'; Dossena (yellow card) 86'	Report	Basha (yellow card) 35'; Cerci (yellow card) 54'; Brighi (yellow card) 64'; Sansone 90+1', (yellow card) 90+2'; Gillet (yellow card) 90+3'	Stadium: Stadio San Paolo; Attendance: 34,813; Referee: Paolo Valeri

11 November 2012 12	Genoa	2–4	Napoli	Genoa
15:00 CET (UTC+01:00)	Immobile 23', (yellow card) 90+2'; Bertolacci 56'; Merkel (yellow card) 78'	Report	Gamberini (yellow card) 40'; Džemaili (yellow card) 45+1'; Behrami (yellow card) 46'; Mesto 54'; Cavani 79'; Hamšík 90'; Insigne 90+4'	Stadium: Stadio Luigi Ferraris; Attendance: 20,581; Referee: Nicola Rizzoli

17 November 2012 13	Napoli	2–2	Milan	Naples
20:45 CET (UTC+01:00)	Inler 4'; Insigne 30'; Cavani (yellow card) 52'; Campagnaro (yellow card) 62'; Cannavaro (yellow card) 64'	Report	El Shaarawy 44', 83', (yellow card) 90'; Bojan (yellow card) 78'	Stadium: Stadio San Paolo; Attendance: 52,546; Referee: Mauro Bergonzi

26 November 2012 14	Cagliari	0–1	Napoli	Quartu Sant'Elena
19:00 CET (UTC+01:00)	Sau (yellow card) 33'; Rossettini (yellow card) 83'; Avelar (yellow card) 90+3'	Report	Džemaili (yellow card) 6'; Hamšík 73'	Stadium: Stadio Is Arenas; Referee: Antonio Danilo Giannoccaro

2 December 2012 15	Napoli	5–1	Pescara	Naples
12:30 CET (UTC+01:00)	Inler 9', 78'; Hamšík 15'; Behrami (yellow card) 39'; Cavani 58' (pen.), 63'; Zúñiga (yellow card) 83'	Report	Bjarnason 18'; Bocchetti (red card) 57'; Zanon (yellow card) 70'; Romagnoli (yellow card) 85'	Stadium: Stadio San Paolo; Attendance: 43,243; Referee: Sebastiano Peruzzo

9 December 2012 16	Internazionale	2–1	Napoli	Milan
20:45 CET (UTC+01:00)	Guarín 6'; Handanović (yellow card) 28'; Milito 39'; Gargano (yellow card) 58'	Report	Gamberini (yellow card) 43'; Cavani 54'; Pandev (yellow card) 60'; Behrami (yellow card) 61'; Britos (yellow card) 90+4'	Stadium: San Siro; Attendance: 57,374; Referee: Nicola Rizzoli

16 December 2012 17	Napoli	2–3	Bologna	Naples
20:45 CET (UTC+01:00)	Gamberini 50'; Cavani 70'	Report	Gabbiadini 10'; Cherubin (yellow card) 18'; Morleo (yellow card) 45+3'; Garics (yellow card) 84'; Kone 86'; Portanova 89'	Stadium: Stadio San Paolo; Attendance: 26,023; Referee: Paolo Valeri

22 December 2012 18	Siena	0–2	Napoli	Siena
15:00 CET (UTC+01:00)	Contini (yellow card) 77'; Calaiò (yellow card) 90' (yellow-red card) 90+1'	Report	Maggio 86'; Cavani 90' (pen.)	Stadium: Stadio Artemio Franchi – Montepaschi Arena; Attendance: 9,489; Referee: Andrea De Marco

6 January 2013 19	Napoli	4–1	Roma	Naples
15:00 CET (UTC+01:00)	Cavani 4', 48', 70'; Campagnaro (yellow card) 22'; De Sanctis (yellow card) 32'; Maggio 90', (yellow card) 90+1'	Report	Pjanić (yellow card) 19' (yellow-red card) 75'; Totti (yellow card) 25'; Osvaldo 72'	Stadium: Stadio San Paolo; Attendance: 42,091; Referee: Paolo Tagliavento

13 January 2013 20	Napoli	3–0	Palermo	Naples
15:00 CET (UTC+01:00)	Maggio 30'; Inler 34'; Insigne 73'	Report	Barreto (yellow card) 45'; Anselmo (yellow card) 54'	Stadium: Stadio San Paolo; Attendance: 27,777; Referee: Andrea Gervasoni

20 January 2012 21	Fiorentina	1–1	Napoli	Florence
12:30 CET (UTC+01:00)	Toni (yellow card) 25'; Savić (yellow card) 28'; Roncaglia 33'; Gonzalo (yellow card) 37'	Report	Behrami (yellow card) 13'; Gamberini (yellow card) 17'; Inler (yellow card) 26'; Cavani 42'	Stadium: Stadio Artemio Franchi; Attendance: 28,632; Referee: Mauro Bergonzi

27 January 2012 22	Parma	1–2	Napoli	Parma
15:00 CET (UTC+01:00)	Santacroce (yellow card) 19'; Paletta (yellow card) 35'; Marchionni (yellow card) 45'; Cannavaro 74' (o.g.); Lucarelli (yellow card) 87'; Valdés (yellow card) 89'	Report	Hamšík 20', (yellow card) 88'; Britos (yellow card) 50'; Campagnaro (yellow card) 64'; Cavani 85'	Stadium: Stadio Ennio Tardini; Attendance: 15,883; Referee: Gianluca Rocchi

2 February 2013 23	Napoli	2–0	Catania	Naples
20:45 CET (UTC+01:00)	Behrami (yellow card) 5'; Hamšík 31'; Grava (yellow card) 40'; Cannavaro 44'; Džemaili (yellow card) 57'	Report	Spolli (yellow card) 37'	Stadium: Stadio San Paolo; Attendance: 46,055; Referee: Gianpaolo Calvarese

9 February 2012 24	Lazio	1–1	Napoli	Rome
20:45 CET (UTC+01:00)	Floccari 11'; Ledesma (yellow card) 50'; Hernanes (yellow card) 57'; Radu (yellow card) 58'; Dias (yellow card) 67'; Cana (yellow card) 81'	Report	Mesto (yellow card) 25'; Insigne (yellow card) 45+3'; Campagnaro (yellow card) 70', (goal) 87'	Stadium: Stadio Olimpico; Attendance: 38,594; Referee: Daniele Orsato

17 February 2013 25	Napoli	0–0	Sampdoria	Naples
15:00 CET (UTC+01:00)	Campagnaro (yellow card) 30'; Inler (yellow card) 63'	Report	Gastaldello (yellow card) 75'	Stadium: Stadio San Paolo; Attendance: 41,734; Referee: Daniele Doveri

25 February 2013 26	Udinese	0–0	Napoli	Udine
19:00 CET (UTC+01:00)	Pereyra (yellow card) 18'	Report	Inler (yellow card) 19'; Armero (yellow card) 65'; Behrami (yellow card) 66'; Cannavaro (yellow card) 81'	Stadium: Stadio Friuli; Attendance: 16,000; Referee: Antonio Damato

1 March 2013 27	Napoli	1–1	Juventus	Naples
20:45 CET (UTC+01:00)	Inler 43'; Cavani (yellow card) 45+2'; Behrami (yellow card) 54'; Cannavaro (yellow card) 56'; Zúñiga (yellow card) 66'	Report	Chiellini 10'; Vidal (yellow card) 44'; Peluso (yellow card) 87'	Stadium: Stadio San Paolo; Attendance: 58,143; Referee: Daniele Orsato

10 March 2013 28	Chievo	2–0	Napoli	Verona
15:00 CET (UTC+01:00)	Dramé 12'; Andreolli (yellow card) 38'; Théréau 43'; Dainelli (yellow card) 58'	Report	Džemaili (yellow card) 53'	Stadium: Stadio Marc'Antonio Bentegodi; Referee: Gianluca Rocchi

17 March 2013 29	Napoli	3–2	Atalanta	Naples
15:00 CET (UTC+01:00)	Cavani 4' (pen.), 65'; Behrami (yellow card) 45'; Pandev 81'; Insigne (yellow card) 90+4'	Report	Giorgi (yellow card) 3'; Lucchini (yellow card) 30'; Cannavaro 31' (o.g.); Denis 73', (yellow card) 84'; Bonaventura (yellow card) 88'	Stadium: Stadio San Paolo; Attendance: 38,337; Referee: Paolo Valeri

30 March 2013 30	Torino	3–5	Napoli	Turin
21:00 CET (UTC+01:00)	Barreto 30'; Darmian (yellow card) 38'; Basha (yellow card) 43'; Rodríguez (yellow card) 51'; Jonathas 75' (pen.); Meggiorini 78'; Glik (yellow card) 80'; Gazzi (yellow card) 90+3'	Report	Džemaili 10', 47', 80', (yellow card) 87'; Cavani (yellow card) 81', (goal) 84', 90'	Stadium: Stadio Olimpico di Torino; Attendance: 18,850; Referee: Antonio Danilo Giannoccaro

7 April 2013 31	Napoli	2–0	Genoa	Naples
20:45 CEST (UTC+02:00)	Pandev 18'; Džemaili 29'; Campagnaro (yellow card) 37'	Report	Kucka (yellow card) 64'; Immobile (yellow card) 73'; Vargas (yellow card) 80'	Stadium: Stadio San Paolo; Attendance: 34,376; Referee: Luca Banti

14 April 2013 32	Milan	1–1	Napoli	Milan
20:45 CEST (UTC+02:00)	Flamini 30', (red card) 72'; Pazzini (yellow card) 84'; Mexès (yellow card) 89'	Report	Pandev 33'; De Sanctis (yellow card) 64'; Maggio (yellow card) 72'; Cavani (yellow card) 75'; Britos (yellow card) 87'; Campagnaro (yellow card) 89'	Stadium: San Siro; Attendance: 72,054; Referee: Gianluca Rocchi

21 April 2013 33	Napoli	3–2	Cagliari	Naples
15:00 CEST (UTC+02:00)	Cannavaro (yellow card) 23'; Astori 48' (o.g.); Cavani (yellow card) 45+1', (goal) 64'; Insigne 90+3'; Behrami (yellow card) 90+6'	Report	Ibarbo 18'; Dessena (yellow card) 42'; Nenê (yellow card) 57'; Nainggolan (yellow card) 65'; Sau 71'; Cabrera (yellow card) 74'; Ekdal (yellow card) 90+6'	Stadium: Stadio San Paolo; Attendance: 39,987; Referee: Andrea De Marco

27 April 2013 34	Pescara	0–3	Napoli	Pescara
20:45 CEST (UTC+02:00)	Rizzo (yellow card) 24'; Di Francesco (yellow card) 53'; Balzano (yellow card) 88'	Report	Britos (yellow card) 30'; Inler 46'; Pandev 58'; Džemaili 81'	Stadium: Stadio Adriatico; Attendance: 11,881; Referee: Andrea Romeo

5 May 2013 35	Napoli	3–1	Internazionale	Naples
20:45 CEST (UTC+02:00)	Cavani 3', 33' (pen.), 78'; Behrami (yellow card) 90+2'	Report	Álvarez 23' (pen.); Jonathan (yellow card) 32'; Juan (yellow card) 62'; Ranocchia (yellow card) 76'	Stadium: Stadio San Paolo; Attendance: 39,569; Referee: Antonio Danilo Giannoccaro

8 May 2013 36	Bologna	0–3	Napoli	Bologna
20:45 CEST (UTC+02:00)	Kone (yellow card) 8'; Gilardino (yellow card) 8'; Pérez (yellow card) 45+2'; Diamanti (yellow card) 57'	Report	Džemaili (yellow card) 36', (goal) 67'; Hamšík 53'; Britos (yellow card) 58'; Cavani 63' (pen.)	Stadium: Stadio Renato Dall'Ara; Attendance: 25,000; Referee: Davide Massa

12 May 2013 37	Napoli	2–1	Siena	Naples
15:00 CEST (UTC+02:00)	Cavani 73'; Insigne (yellow card) 77'; Hamšík 90+3'	Report	Grillo 36'	Stadium: Stadio San Paolo; Attendance: 52,433; Referee: Piero Giacomelli

19 May 2013 38	Roma	2–1	Napoli	Rome
20:45 CEST (UTC+02:00)	Marquinho 47'; Destro 58', (yellow card) 78'	Report	Rolando (yellow card) 80'; Cavani 84'; Džemaili (yellow card) 85'; Armero (yellow card) 87'	Stadium: Stadio Olimpico; Attendance: 32,454; Referee: Luca Banti

=== Coppa Italia ===
19 December 2012 Round of 16	Napoli	1–2	Bologna	Naples
21:00 CET (UTC+01:00)	Cavani 12'	Report	Pasquato 38'; Kone 90+2'	Stadium: Stadio San Paolo; Attendance: 10,366; Referee: Daniele Doveri

=== UEFA Europa League ===
==== Group stage ====
Pos	Team	Pld	W	D	L	GF	GA	GD	Pts	Qualification
1	(Ukraine) Dnipro Dnipropetrovsk	6	5	0	1	16	8	+8	15	Advance to knockout phase
2	(Italy) Napoli	6	3	0	3	12	12	0	9	Advance to knockout phase
3	(Netherlands) PSV Eindhoven	6	2	1	3	8	7	+1	7	
4	(Sweden) AIK	6	1	1	4	5	14	−9	4	

Source: Soccerway

20 September 2012 1	Napoli (Italy)	4–0	(Sweden) AIK	Naples, Italy
19:00 CEST (UTC+02:00)	Vargas 6', 46', 69'; Donadel (yellow card) 45+1'; Hamšík (red card) 75'; Džemaili 90+1'	Report	Johansson (yellow card) 75'; Bangura (yellow card) 89'	Stadium: Stadio San Paolo; Attendance: 35,000; Referee: Clément Turpin (France)

4 October 2012 2	PSV Eindhoven (Netherlands)	3–0	(Italy) Napoli	Eindhoven, Netherlands
21:05 CEST (UTC+02:00)	Lens 19'; Mertens 41'; Bouma (yellow card) 55'; Marcelo 52'; Derijck (yellow card) 74'	Report	El Kaddouri (yellow card) 2'; Dossena (yellow card) 48'; Fernández (yellow card) 57'; Cannavaro (yellow card) 84'; Mesto (yellow card) 86'; Pandev (yellow card) 86'; Cavani (yellow card) 88'; Aronica (yellow card) 90+1'	Stadium: Philips Stadion; Attendance: 18,200; Referee: Alexandru Tudor (Romania)

25 October 2012 3	Dnipro Dnipropetrovsk (Ukraine)	3–1	(Italy) Napoli	Dnipropetrovsk, Ukraine
21:05 CEST (UTC+02:00)	Fedetskiy 2'; Matheus 42'; Giuliano 64'; Kankava (yellow card) 69'; Mazuch (yellow card) 74'	Report	Donadel (yellow card) 40'; Džemaili (yellow card) 41'; Fernández (yellow card) 45+1'; Cavani 75' (pen.)	Stadium: Dnipro Arena; Attendance: 29,000; Referee: Hüseyin Göçek (Turkey)

8 November 2012 4	Napoli (Italy)	4–2	(Ukraine) Dnipro Dnipropetrovsk	Naples, Italy
19:00 CET (UTC+01:00)	Cavani 7', 77', 88', 90+3'; Inler (yellow card) 52'; Fernández (yellow card) 81'	Report	Konoplyanka (yellow card) 21'; Aliyev (yellow card) 25'; Fedetskiy 34'; Zozulya 52'; Rotan (yellow card) 76'; Mandzyuk (yellow card) 78'	Stadium: Stadio San Paolo; Attendance: 25,000; Referee: Alon Yefet (Israel)

22 November 2012 5	AIK (Sweden)	1–2	(Italy) Napoli	Solna, Sweden
21:05 CET (UTC+01:00)	Daníelsson 35'; Moro (yellow card) 45'; Backman (yellow card) 72'	Report	Džemaili 20'; Cavani (yellow card) 45+1', (goal) 90+3' (pen.); Aronica (red card) 85'; Behrami (yellow card) 90'	Stadium: Råsunda Stadium; Attendance: 28,552; Referee: Ovidiu Hațegan (Romania)

6 December 2012 6	Napoli (Italy)	1–3	(Netherlands) PSV Eindhoven	Naples, Italy
19:00 CET (UTC+01:00)	Cavani 18'; Campagnaro (yellow card) 71'	Report	Van Ooijen (yellow card) 12'; Matavž 30', 41', 60'; Depay (yellow card) 71'; Wijnaldum (yellow card) 74'	Stadium: Stadio San Paolo; Attendance: 9,434; Referee: Mike Dean (England)

==== Knockout phase ====
===== Round of 32 =====
14 February 2013 First leg	Napoli (Italy)	0–3	(Czech Republic) Viktoria Plzeň	Naples, Italy
19:00 CET (UTC+01:00)	Rolando (yellow card) 39'; Inler (yellow card) 80'	Report	Darida 28'; Rajtoral 79'; Tecl 90'; Hejda (yellow card) 90+4'	Stadium: Stadio San Paolo; Attendance: 15,000; Referee: Pol van Boekel (Netherlands)

21 February 2013 Second leg	Viktoria Plzeň (Czech Republic)	2–0 (5–0 agg.)	(Italy) Napoli	Plzeň, Czech Republic
21:05 CET (UTC+01:00)	Limberský (yellow card) 16'; Kovařík 51'; Bakoš (yellow card) 55'; Darida (yellow card) 70'; Tecl 74'	Report	Behrami (yellow card) 31'; Donadel (yellow card) 43'; Gamberini (yellow card) 55'; Cavani (yellow card) 70'; Maggio (yellow card) 76'	Stadium: Stadion města Plzně; Attendance: 11,067; Referee: Viktor Kassai (Hungary)

== Statistics ==
=== Appearances and goals ===
No.	Pos	Nat	Player	Total		Serie A		Coppa Italia		Europa League		Supercoppa Italiana	
No.	Pos	Nat	Player	Apps	Goals	Apps	Goals	Apps	Goals	Apps	Goals	Apps	Goals
Goalkeepers
1	GK	(Italy) ITA	Morgan De Sanctis	38	0	34	0	1	0	2	0	1	0
15	GK	(Italy) ITA	Roberto Colombo	0	0	0	0	0	0	0	0	0	0
22	GK	(Italy) ITA	Antonio Rosati	10	0	4	0	0	0	6	0	0	0
Defenders
2	DF	(Italy) ITA	Gianluca Grava	2	0	2	0	0	0	0	0	0	0
5	DF	(Uruguay) URU	Miguel Britos	27	0	22	0	1	0	3	0	1	0
6	DF	(Portugal) POR	Rolando	9	0	4+3	0	0	0	2	0	0	0
11	DF	(Italy) ITA	Christian Maggio	36	4	31	4	1	0	3	0	1	0
14	DF	(Argentina) ARG	Hugo Campagnaro	31	1	27+1	1	1	0	1	0	1	0
16	DF	(Italy) ITA	Giandomenico Mesto	23	1	7+9	1	1	0	5+1	0	0	0
18	DF	(Colombia) COL	Juan Zúñiga	40	0	30+2	0	0+1	0	3+3	0	1	0
27	DF	(Colombia) COL	Pablo Armero	15	0	4+11	0	0	0	0	0	0	0
28	DF	(Italy) ITA	Paolo Cannavaro	35	1	32	1	0	0	1+1	0	1	0
55	DF	(Italy) ITA	Alessandro Gamberini	30	1	24+1	1	0	0	5	0	0	0
Midfielders
4	MF	(Italy) ITA	Marco Donadel	13	0	1+3	0	1	0	8	0	0	0
13	MF	(Morocco) MAR	Omar El Kaddouri	12	0	1+6	0	1	0	4	0	0	0
17	MF	(Slovakia) SVK	Marek Hamšík	44	11	37+1	11	0+1	0	0+4	0	1	0
20	MF	(Switzerland) SUI	Blerim Džemaili	41	9	19+15	7	0	0	6+1	2	0	0
85	MF	(Switzerland) SUI	Valon Behrami	37	0	32+1	0	0	0	3	0	1	0
88	MF	(Switzerland) SUI	Gökhan Inler	39	6	25+6	6	1	0	2+4	0	1	0
Forwards
7	FW	(Uruguay) URU	Edinson Cavani	43	38	33+1	29	1	1	4+3	7	1	1
9	FW	(Italy) ITA	Emanuele Calaiò	8	0	1+5	0	0	0	1+1	0	0	0
19	FW	(North Macedonia) MKD	Goran Pandev	41	7	25+8	6	1	0	2+4	0	1	1
24	FW	(Italy) ITA	Lorenzo Insigne	43	5	16+21	5	0+1	0	4+1	0	0	0
Players transferred out during the season
6	DF	(Italy) ITA	Salvatore Aronica	10	0	3+2	0	0	0	5	0	0	0
8	DF	(Italy) ITA	Andrea Dossena	15	0	3+4	0	1	0	6	0	0+1	0
9	FW	(Chile) CHI	Eduardo Vargas	15	3	0+9	0	0	0	6	3	0	0
21	DF	(Argentina) ARG	Federico Fernández	9	0	1+1	0	1	0	5	0	0+1	0
23	MF	(Uruguay) URU	Walter Gargano	1	0	0	0	0	0	0	0	0+1	0

Last updated: 19 May 2013
Source: Competitions

=== Goalscorers ===
Rank	No.	Pos	Nat	Name	Serie A	Supercoppa	Coppa Italia	UEFA EL	Total
1	7	FW	(Uruguay)	Edinson Cavani	29	1	1	7	38
2	17	MF	(Slovakia)	Marek Hamšík	11	0	0	0	11
3	20	MF	(Switzerland)	Blerim Džemaili	7	0	0	2	9
4	19	FW	(North Macedonia)	Goran Pandev	6	1	0	0	7
5	88	MF	(Switzerland)	Gökhan Inler	6	0	0	0	6
6	24	FW	(Italy)	Lorenzo Insigne	5	0	0	0	5
7	11	DF	(Italy)	Christian Maggio	4	0	0	0	4
8	9	FW	(Chile)	Eduardo Vargas	0	0	0	3	3
9	14	DF	(Argentina)	Hugo Campagnaro	1	0	0	0	1
9	16	DF	(Italy)	Giandomenico Mesto	1	0	0	0	1
9	28	DF	(Italy)	Paolo Cannavaro	1	0	0	0	1
9	55	DF	(Italy)	Alessandro Gamberini	1	0	0	0	1
Own goal					1	0	0	0	1
Totals					73	2	1	12	88

Last updated: 19 May 2013
