= 2013–14 SSC Napoli season =

Napoli
2013–14 season
- Chairman: Aurelio De Laurentiis
- Manager: Rafael Benítez
- Stadium: Stadio San Paolo
- Serie A: 3rd
- Coppa Italia: Winners
- UEFA Champions League: Group stage (3rd)
- UEFA Europa League: Round of 16
- Top goalscorer: League: Gonzalo Higuaín (17); All: Gonzalo Higuaín (24)
- Highest home attendance: 56,225 vs Sampdoria (6 January 2014, Serie A)
- Lowest home attendance: 10,000 vs Hellas Verona (24 February 2014, Serie A)
- Average home league attendance: 40,632
Home colours	Away colours	Third colours

The 2013–14 season saw Società Sportiva Calcio Napoli compete in Serie A, UEFA Champions League, UEFA Europa League and Coppa Italia. It was the club's 68th season in Serie A.

== Players ==
=== Squad information ===
As of 30 March 2014

Note: Flags indicate national team as defined under FIFA eligibility rules; some limited exceptions apply. Players may hold more than one non-FIFA nationality.

No.	Pos.	Nation	Player
1	GK	BRA	Rafael
2	DF	FRA	Anthony Réveillère
4	DF	BRA	Henrique
5	DF	URU	Miguel Britos
7	FW	ESP	José Callejón
8	MF	BRA	Jorginho
9	FW	ARG	Gonzalo Higuaín
11	DF	ITA	Christian Maggio (vice-captain)
13	MF	ITA	Davide Bariti
14	FW	BEL	Dries Mertens
15	GK	ITA	Roberto Colombo
16	DF	ITA	Giandomenico Mesto
17	MF	SVK	Marek Hamšík (captain)
18	DF	COL	Juan Zúñiga

No.	Pos.	Nation	Player
19	FW	MKD	Goran Pandev
20	MF	SUI	Blerim Džemaili
21	DF	ARG	Federico Fernández
22	MF	CRO	Josip Radošević
24	FW	ITA	Lorenzo Insigne
25	GK	ESP	Pepe Reina (on loan from Liverpool)
31	DF	ALG	Faouzi Ghoulam
33	DF	ESP	Raúl Albiol
80	GK	ESP	Toni Doblas
85	MF	SUI	Valon Behrami
88	MF	SUI	Gökhan Inler
91	FW	COL	Duván Zapata
95	DF	POL	Igor Łasicki

== Transfers ==
=== In ===
No.	Pos.	Nat.	Name	Age	EU	Moving from	Type	Transfer window	Ends	Transfer fee	Source
27	DF	(Colombia)	Pablo Armero	26	Non-EU	Udinese	Co-Ownership	Summer	2016	€4 million	S.S.C. Napoli
13	MF	(Morocco)	Omar El Kaddouri	22	EU	Brescia	Full Ownership	Summer	2017	€1.4 million	S.S.C. Napoli
14	FW	(Belgium)	Dries Mertens	26	EU	PSV (Netherlands)	Transfer	Summer	2018	€9.5 million	S.S.C. Napoli
82	FW	(Italy)	Emanuele Calaiò	31	EU	Siena	Transfer	Summer	2015	€1.25 million	
22	MF	(Croatia)	Josip Radošević	19	EU	Hajduk Split (Croatia)	Transfer	Summer	2017	€1 million	
7	FW	(Spain)	José Callejón	26	EU	Real Madrid (Spain)	Transfer	Summer	2018	€9.5 million	S.S.C. Napoli
1	GK	(Brazil)	Rafael	23	EU	Santos (Brazil)	Transfer	Summer	2018	€5 million	S.S.C. Napoli
33	DF	(Spain)	Raúl Albiol	27	EU	Real Madrid (Spain)	Transfer	Summer	2017	€12 million	S.S.C. Napoli
9	FW	(Argentina)	Gonzalo Higuaín	25	EU	Real Madrid (Spain)	Transfer	Summer	2018	€37 million	S.S.C Napoli
25	GK	(Spain)	Pepe Reina	30	EU	Liverpool (England)	Loan	Summer	2014	Free	S.S.C. Napoli
91	FW	(Colombia)	Duván Zapata	22	Non-EU	Estudiantes (LP) (Argentina)	Transfer	Summer	2018	€7.5 million	S.S.C. Napoli
2	DF	(France)	Anthony Réveillère	33	EU	Free agent	Transfer	Summer	2014	Free	S.S.C. Napoli
8	MF	(Brazil)	Jorginho	22	EU	Verona	Co-ownership	Winter	2018	€5.5 million	S.S.C. Napoli
—	GK	(Argentina)	Mariano Andújar	30	EU	Catania	Co-Ownership	Winter	2017	€2 million	S.S.C. Napoli
4	DF	(Brazil)	Henrique	27	Non-EU	Palmeiras (Brazil)	Transfer	Winter	2017	€4 million	S.S.C. Napoli
31	DF	(Algeria)	Faouzi Ghoulam	22	EU	Saint-Étienne (France)	Transfer	Winter	2018	€5 million	S.S.C. Napoli
80	GK	(Spain)	Toni Doblas	33	EU	Free agent	Transfer	Winter	2014	Free	S.S.C. Napoli

Total expenditure: €104.65 million

=== Out ===
No.	Pos.	Nat.	Name	Age	EU	Moving to	Type	Transfer window	Transfer fee	Source
—	MF	(Italy)	Andrea Mazzarani	24	EU	Udinese	Ownership Resolved	Summer	Free	Serie A
6	DF	(Portugal)	Rolando	27	EU	Porto (Portugal)	End of Loan	Summer	N/A	
—	DF	(Italy)	Francesco Bruno	23	EU	Casertana	Released	Summer	Free	
—	MF	(Italy)	Walter Guerra	21	EU	Free agent	Released	Summer	Free	
2	DF	(Italy)	Gianluca Grava	36	EU	Retirement	End of Career	Summer	N/A	
—	MF	(Italy)	Luca Cigarini	27	EU	Atalanta	Co-Ownership	Summer	€2.2 million	Serie A
22	GK	(Italy)	Antonio Rosati	30	EU	Sassuolo	Loan	Summer	Free	U.S. Sassuolo Calcio
13	MF	(Morocco)	Omar El Kaddouri	22	EU	Torino	Loan	Summer	Free	Torino F.C.
94	MF	(Italy)	Giuseppe Fornito	18	EU	Pescara	Loan	Summer	Free	
14	DF	(Argentina)	Hugo Campagnaro	33	EU	Internazionale	End of Contract	Summer	Free	Inter Milan
7	FW	(Uruguay)	Edinson Cavani	26	EU	Paris Saint-Germain (France)	Transfer	Summer	€64.5 million	Paris Saint-German F.C.
55	DF	(Italy)	Alessandro Gamberini	31	EU	Genoa	Loan	Summer	Free	S.S.C. Napoli
—	MF	(Italy)	Carlo Collela	21	EU	Mariano Keller	Released	Summer	Free	Tutto Mercato Web
1	GK	(Italy)	Morgan De Sanctis	36	EU	Roma	Transfer	Summer	€0.5 million	A.S. Roma
—	MF	(Argentina)	Cristian Chávez	26	Non-EU	PAS Giannina (Greece)	Transfer	Summer	Free	PAS Giannina F.C.
—	MF	(Argentina)	Mario Santana	31	EU	Genoa	Transfer	Summer	€3 million	Genoa C.F.C.
—	FW	(Austria)	Erwin Hoffer	26	EU	Fortuna Düsseldorf (Germany)	Transfer	Summer	€0.5 million	Fortuna Düsseldorf
33	DF	(Italy)	Leandro Rinaudo	30	EU	Livorno	End of Contract	Summer	Free	A.S. Livorno Calcio
4	MF	(Italy)	Marco Donadel	30	EU	Hellas Verona	Loan	Summer	Free	Hellas Verona F.C.
8	DF	(Italy)	Andrea Dossena	31	EU	Sunderland (England)	Transfer	Summer	Free	Sunderland A.F.C.
86	FW	(Hungary)	Soma Novothny	19	EU	Paganese	Loan	Summer	Free	
—	FW	(Italy)	Camillo Ciano	23	EU	Avellino	Loan	Winter	Free	A.S. Avellino 1912
22	GK	(Italy)	Antonio Rosati	30	EU	Fiorentina	Loan	Winter	Free	ACF Fiorentina
—	GK	(Argentina)	Mariano Andújar	30	EU	Catania	Loan	Winter	Free	Calcio Catania
27	DF	(Colombia)	Pablo Armero	27	Non-EU	West Ham United (England)	Loan	Winter	Free	West Ham United F.C.
28	DF	(Italy)	Paolo Cannavaro	32	EU	Sassuolo	Loan	Winter	Free	U.S. Sassuolo Calcio
—	FW	(Italy)	Nicolao Dumitru	22	EU	Reggina	Loan	Winter	Free	Reggina Calcio
—	FW	(Chile)	Eduardo Vargas	24	Non-EU	Valencia (Spain)	Loan	Winter	€0.5 million	Valencia CF
3	DF	(Brazil)	Bruno Uvini	22	EU	Santos (Brazil)	Loan	Winter	Free	S.S.C. Napoli

Last updated: 30 March 2014
EU = if holds or not a European Union passport; Country: when 2 flags, 1st flag = country that plays for internationally, 2nd flag = country of birth; N = number on jersey; P = Position (for position name, pause mouse pointer on abbreviation); Name = Name on jersey (for more extensive name, pause mouse pointer on name); Age = age on the day of the signing; Moving from = only indicate the club the player was playing before start playing for this club in this season, for the type of the moving see Status column; Moving to = only indicates the club the player is going to play next, for the type of the moving see Status column; Ends = when the player's current contract ends; n/a = Not applicable.

Total revenue: €71.2 million

Net income: ▼€34.45 million

== Pre-season and friendlies ==
20 July 2013 Friendly	FeralpiSalò	1–5	Napoli	Salò
17:30 CEST (UTC+02:00)	Pinardi 48' (pen.)	Report	Calaiò 15', 35'; Bariti 18'; Džemaili 38'; Novothny 87'	Stadium: Stadio Lino Turino; Referee: Alessandro Caso di Verona

26 July 2013 Friendly	Carpi	0–3	Napoli	Dimaro
17:00 CEST (UTC+02:00)		Report	Pandev 9'; Behrami 14'; Džemaili 19'	Stadium: Stadio Comunale; Referee: Daniele Rasia di Bassano del Grappa

29 July 2013 Lete Cup	Napoli	3–1	(Turkey) Galatasaray	Naples
20:45 CEST (UTC+02:00)	Pandev 5'; Zúñiga 81'; Insigne 90+4' (pen.)	Report	Amrabat 58'; Nounkeu (red card) 90+1'; Muslera (red card) 90+3'	Stadium: Stadio San Paolo; Attendance: 54,694

3 August 2013 Emirates Cup	Arsenal (England)	2–2	Napoli	London, England
17:20 CEST (UTC+02:00)	Podolski (penalty missed) 18'; Giroud 72'; Koscielny 86'	Report	Insigne 7'; Pandev 28'; Dossena (yellow card) 80'	Stadium: Emirates Stadium; Attendance: 59,554; Referee: Kevin Friend

4 August 2013 Emirates Cup	Napoli	1–3	(Portugal) Porto	London, England
15:00 CEST (UTC+02:00)	Pandev 45' (pen.)	Report	Ghilas 50'; Fernández 68' (o.g.); Licá 78'	Stadium: Emirates Stadium; Attendance: 59,608; Referee: Anthony Taylor

9 August 2013 MSC Crociere Cup	Napoli	2–1	(Portugal) Benfica	Naples
20:45 CEST (UTC+02:00)	Behrami 8'; Higuaín 70'	Report	Luisão 44'	Stadium: Stadio San Paolo; Attendance: 37,717

14 August 2013 Friendly	Cesena	1–0	Napoli	Cesena
20:45 CEST (UTC+02:00)	Nadarević 11'	Report	Callejón (penalty missed) 35'	Stadium: Stadio Dino Manuzzi

== Competitions ==
=== Serie A ===
==== League table ====
Pos	Team	Pld	W	D	L	GF	GA	GD	Pts	Qualification or relegation
1	Juventus (C)	38	33	3	2	80	23	+57	102	Qualification for the Champions League group stage
2	Roma	38	26	7	5	72	25	+47	85	Qualification for the Champions League group stage
3	Napoli	38	23	9	6	77	39	+38	78	Qualification for the Champions League play-off round
4	Fiorentina	38	19	8	11	65	44	+21	65	Qualification for the Europa League group stage (Note: Since the 2013–14 Coppa Italia champions Napoli and runners–up Fiorentina qualified for the 2014–15 European football season thus 4th, 5th and 6th in Serie A (barring any failure to receive a "UEFA licence" from the FIGC or a ban from European competition) would qualify for group stage, play-off round and third qualifying round respectively.)
5	Internazionale	38	15	15	8	62	39	+23	60	Qualification for the Europa League play-off round

Source: Serie A, Soccerway
Rules for classification: 1st points; 2nd head-to-head points; 3rd head-to-head goal difference; 4th goal difference; 5th number of goals scored; 6th public draw.
(Head-to-head record is applied for clubs with the same number of points only once all matches between said clubs have been played)
(C) Champions

==== Results summary ====
Overall								Home						Away					
Pld	W	D	L	GF	GA	GD	Pts	W	D	L	GF	GA	GD	W	D	L	GF	GA	GD
38	23	9	6	77	39	+38	78	13	4	2	43	15	+28	10	5	4	34	24	+10

Last updated: 11 May 2014.
Source: Competitive matches

==== Results by round ====
Round	1	2	3	4	5	6	7	8	9	10	11	12	13	14	15	16	17	18	19	20	21	22	23	24	25	26	27	28	29	30	31	32	33	34	35	36	37	38
Ground	H	A	H	A	H	A	H	A	H	A	H	A	H	A	H	H	A	H	A	A	H	A	H	A	H	A	H	A	H	A	H	A	H	A	A	H	A	H
Result	W	W	W	W	D	W	W	L	W	W	W	L	L	W	D	W	D	W	W	D	D	L	W	W	D	D	W	W	L	W	W	L	W	D	D	W	W	W
Position	1	1	1	2	3	2	2	2	2	2	2	3	3	3	3	3	3	3	3	3	3	3	3	3	3	3	3	3	3	3	3	3	3	3	3	3	3	3

Updated to match(es) played on 11 May 2014. Source: Competitive matches
A = Away; H = Home; W = Win; D = Draw; L = Loss

==== Matches ====
25 August 2013 1	Napoli	3–0	Bologna	Naples
20:45 CEST (UTC+02:00)	Maggio (yellow card) 28'; Callejón 32'; Hamšík 45+2', 63'	Report	Krhin (yellow card) 3'; Kone (yellow card) 85'; Garics (yellow card) 88'	Stadium: Stadio San Paolo; Attendance: 39,632; Referee: Andrea De Marco

31 August 2013 2	Chievo	2–4	Napoli	Verona
18:00 CEST (UTC+02:00)	Paloschi 24', 40'; Rigoni (yellow card) 56'	Report	Hamšík 13', 64'; Callejón 27'; Britos (yellow card) 62'; Higuaín 70'	Stadium: Stadio Marc'Antonio Bentegodi; Attendance: 10,031; Referee: Paolo Valeri

14 September 2013 3	Napoli	2–0	Atalanta	Naples
20:45 CEST (UTC+02:00)	Higuaín 71'; Callejón (yellow card) 74', (goal) 81'	Report	Cigarini (yellow card) 35' (yellow-red card) 74'	Stadium: Stadio San Paolo; Attendance: 38,821; Referee: Gianluca Rocchi

22 September 2013 4	Milan	1–2	Napoli	Milan
20:45 CEST (UTC+02:00)	Balotelli (yellow card) 57' (yellow-red card) 90+4', (goal) 90+1'; Poli (yellow card) 62'; De Jong (yellow card) 67'	Report	Britos 6', (yellow card) 85'; Higuaín 53'	Stadium: San Siro; Attendance: 51,384; Referee: Luca Banti

25 September 2013 5	Napoli	1–1	Sassuolo	Naples
20:45 CEST (UTC+02:00)	Džemaili 15'; Fernández (yellow card) 46'; Inler (yellow card) 73'	Report	Zaza 20'; Marzoratti (yellow card) 66'; Laribi (yellow card) 85'	Stadium: Stadio San Paolo; Attendance: 55,677; Referee: Daniele Doveri

28 September 2013 6	Genoa	0–2	Napoli	Genoa
18:00 CEST (UTC+02:00)	Matuzalém (yellow card) 32'; Kucka (yellow card) 62'	Report	Mesto (yellow card) 5'; Pandev 14', 25'; Higuaín (yellow card) 87'	Stadium: Stadio Luigi Ferraris; Attendance: 23,883; Referee: Antonio Damato

6 October 2013 7	Napoli	4–0	Livorno	Naples
15:00 CEST (UTC+02:00)	Pandev 3'; Inler 26'; Callejón 54'; Hamšík 83'	Report	Luci (yellow card) 61'; Rinaudo (yellow card) 90+2'	Stadium: Stadio San Paolo; Attendance: 46,503; Referee: Mauro Bergonzi

18 October 2013 8	Roma	2–0	Napoli	Rome
20:45 CEST (UTC+02:00)	Pjanić 45+4', 71' (pen.), (yellow card) 74'; Benatia (yellow card) 90+2'	Report	Pandev (yellow card) 25'; Cannavaro (yellow card) 45+2' (yellow-red card) 70'; Inler (yellow card) 74'	Stadium: Stadio Olimpico; Attendance: 45,913; Referee: Daniele Orsato

27 October 2013 9	Napoli	2–0	Torino	Naples
12:30 CEST (UTC+02:00)	Higuaín 14' (pen.), 32' (pen.); Fernández (yellow card) 45'	Report	Basha (red card) 87'	Stadium: Stadio San Paolo; Attendance: 42,209; Referee: Andrea De Marco

30 October 2013 10	Fiorentina	1–2	Napoli	Florence
20:45 CET (UTC+01:00)	Rossi 28' (pen.); Cuadrado (yellow card) 54' (yellow-red card) 90+1'; Valero (yellow card) 63'; Compper (yellow card) 76'	Report	Callejón 12'; Pandev (yellow card) 22'; Maggio (yellow card) 28' (yellow-red card) 80'; Mertens 36'; Behrami (yellow card) 55'; Albiol (yellow card) 60'	Stadium: Stadio Artemio Franchi; Attendance: 34,482; Referee: Gianpaolo Calvarese

2 November 2013 11	Napoli	2–1	Catania	Naples
20:45 CET (UTC+01:00)	Callejón 15'; Hamšík 20'	Report	Castro 25'	Stadium: Stadio San Paolo; Attendance: 47,609; Referee: Massimiliano Irrati

10 November 2013 12	Juventus	3–0	Napoli	Turin
20:45 CET (UTC+01:00)	Llorente 2'; Bonucci (yellow card) 51'; Ogbonna (yellow card) 57' (yellow-red card) 83'; Vidal (yellow card) 72'; Pirlo 74'; Pogba 80'	Report	Hamšík (yellow card) 61'	Stadium: Juventus Stadium; Attendance: 38,969; Referee: Gianluca Rocchi

23 November 2013 13	Napoli	0–1	Parma	Naples
20:45 CET (UTC+01:00)	Higuaín (yellow card) 45'; Britos (yellow card) 79'	Report	Gargano (yellow card) 70'; Benalouane (yellow card) 74'; Cassano 81'	Stadium: Stadio San Paolo; Attendance: 36,400; Referee: Paolo Mazzoleni

2 December 2013 14	Lazio	2–4	Napoli	Rome
21:00 CET (UTC+01:00)	Behrami 25' (o.g.); Ciani (yellow card) 52'; Radu (yellow card) 68'; Keita 88'	Report	Higuaín 24', 72'; Pandev 50'; Britos (yellow card) 76'; Armero (yellow card) 79'; Callejón 90+1'	Stadium: Stadio Olimpico; Attendance: 38,112; Referee: Mauro Bergonzi

7 December 2013 15	Napoli	3–3	Udinese	Naples
20:45 CET (UTC+01:00)	Albiol (yellow card) 36'; Pandev 38', 41', (yellow card) 52'; Fernández (yellow card) 48'; Džemaili 71', (yellow card) 75'	Report	Fernández 45' (o.g.); Fernandes (yellow card) 62', (goal) 70'; Basta 81'; Domizzi (yellow card) 89'	Stadium: Stadio San Paolo; Attendance: 34,720; Referee: Andrea Gervasoni

15 December 2013 16	Napoli	4–2	Internazionale	Naples
20:45 CET (UTC+01:00)	Higuaín 9'; Insigne (yellow card) 29'; Inler (yellow card) 32'; Mertens 39'; Džemaili 41'; Callejón 81'	Report	Cambiasso 35'; Nagatomo 45+2'; Álvarez (yellow card) 46' (yellow-red card) 71'; Ranocchia (yellow card) 90+2'	Stadium: Stadio San Paolo; Attendance: 42,555; Referee: Paolo Tagliavento

21 December 2013 17	Cagliari	1–1	Napoli	Quartu Sant'Elena
20:45 CET (UTC+01:00)	Nenê (yellow card) 5', (goal) 9'; Pisano (yellow card) 74'	Report	Higuaín 19' (pen.); Callejón (yellow card) 41'; Behrami (yellow card) 65'	Stadium: Stadio Is Arenas; Attendance: 6,500; Referee: Paolo Valeri

6 January 2014 18	Napoli	2–0	Sampdoria	Naples
12:30 CET (UTC+01:00)	Higuaín (yellow card) 44'; Mertens (yellow card) 45', (goal) 53', 62'; Zapata (yellow card) 81'	Report	Obiang (yellow card) 35'; Regini (yellow card) 42'; Mustafi (yellow card) 61'	Stadium: Stadio San Paolo; Attendance: 56,225; Referee: Luca Banti

12 January 2014 19	Hellas Verona	0–3	Napoli	Verona
15:00 CET (UTC+01:00)	Cacciatore (yellow card) 85'	Report	Mertens 27'; Insigne 72'; Džemaili 76', (yellow card) 84'	Stadium: Stadio Marc'Antonio Bentegodi; Attendance: 22,756; Referee: Daniele Doveri

19 January 2014 20	Bologna	2–2	Napoli	Bologna
15:00 CET (UTC+01:00)	Bianchi 37', 90', (yellow card) 56'; Pérez (yellow card) 44'; Kone (yellow card) 57' (yellow-red card) 84'; Garics (yellow card) 60'; Pazienza (yellow card) 64'	Report	Albiol (yellow card) 15'; Higuaín 62' (pen.); Callejón 80'; Fernández (yellow card) 90+1'	Stadium: Stadio Renato Dall'Ara; Attendance: 23,398; Referee: Antonio Damato

25 January 2014 21	Napoli	1–1	Chievo	Naples
18:00 CET (UTC+01:00)	Maggio (yellow card) 59'; Albiol 88'	Report	Sardo 18'; Cesar (yellow card) 61'; Dainelli (yellow card) 66'	Stadium: Stadio San Paolo; Attendance: 39,157; Referee: Massimiliano Irrati

2 February 2014 22	Atalanta	3–0	Napoli	Bergamo
15:00 CET (UTC+01:00)	Denis 47', 64'; Moralez 70'	Report	Réveillère (yellow card) 66'; Mertens (yellow card) 67'	Stadium: Stadio Atleti Azzurri d'Italia; Attendance: 12,503; Referee: Nicola Rizzoli

8 February 2014 23	Napoli	3–1	Milan	Naples
20:45 CET (UTC+01:00)	Inler 11', (yellow card) 38'; Higuaín 56', 82'; Jorginho (yellow card) 68'; Callejón (yellow card) 87'	Report	Taarabt 7', (yellow card) 54'; Abbiati (yellow card) 22'	Stadium: Stadio San Paolo; Attendance: 38,593; Referee: Davide Massa

16 February 2014 24	Sassuolo	0–2	Napoli	Reggio Emilia
15:00 CET (UTC+01:00)	Marrone (yellow card) 20'; Ariaudo (yellow card) 53'; Longhi (yellow card) 57'; Zaza (yellow card) 86'	Report	Džemaili 37', (yellow card) 45+3'; Insigne (yellow card) 43', (goal) 55'; Radošević (yellow card) 89'	Stadium: Mapei Stadium – Città del Tricolore; Attendance: 17,713; Referee: Gianpaolo Calvarese

24 February 2014 25	Napoli	1–1	Genoa	Naples
21:00 CET (UTC+01:00)	Higuaín 18', (yellow card) 71'; Hamšík (yellow card) 45'; Albiol (yellow card) 53'; Callejón (yellow card) 73'; Mertens (yellow card) 83'	Report	Matuzalém (yellow card) 31'; Sculli (yellow card) 40'; Calaiò 84'	Stadium: Stadio San Paolo; Attendance: 30,377; Referee: Luca Banti

2 March 2014 26	Livorno	1–1	Napoli	Livorno
18:30 CET (UTC+01:00)	Reina 39' (o.g.); Benassi (yellow card) 52'; Mbaye (yellow card) 64'	Report	Mertens 27' (pen.); Britos (yellow card) 85'; Maggio (yellow card) 90+2'	Stadium: Stadio Armando Picchi; Attendance: 11,803; Referee: Paolo Mazzoleni

9 March 2014 27	Napoli	1–0	Roma	Naples
20:45 CET (UTC+01:00)	Callejón (yellow card) 34', (goal) 81'	Report	Maicon (yellow card) 33'; Taddei (yellow card) 84'	Stadium: Stadio San Paolo; Attendance: 38,879; Referee: Gianluca Rocchi

17 March 2014 28	Torino	0–1	Napoli	Turin
19:00 CET (UTC+01:00)	Bovo (yellow card) 7'; Glik (yellow card) 65'	Report	Jorginho (yellow card) 39'; Inler (yellow card) 55'; Higuaín 90'	Stadium: Stadio Olimpico di Torino; Attendance: 21,780; Referee: Daniele Doveri

23 March 2014 29	Napoli	0–1	Fiorentina	Naples
18:30 CET (UTC+01:00)	Ghoulam (red card) 37'; Higuaín (yellow card) 58'	Report	Gonzalo (yellow card) 49'; Joaquín 87'	Stadium: Stadio San Paolo; Attendance: 46,522; Referee: Paolo Tagliavento

26 March 2014 30	Catania	2–4	Napoli	Catania
20:45 CET (UTC+01:00)	Keko (yellow card) 23'; Monzón 52'; Gyömbér 75'	Report	Zapata 16', 43'; Callejón 25'; Henrique 40'	Stadium: Stadio Angelo Massimino; Attendance: 13,513; Referee: Davide Massa

30 March 2014 31	Napoli	2–0	Juventus	Naples
20:45 CEST (UTC+02:00)	Inler (yellow card) 35'; Callejón 37'; Henrique (yellow card) 63'; Mertens 81'	Report	Lichtsteiner (yellow card) 54'; Bonucci (yellow card) 58'; Vidal (yellow card) 90+3'	Stadium: Stadio San Paolo; Attendance: 46,134; Referee: Daniele Orsato

6 April 2014 32	Parma	1–0	Napoli	Parma
20:45 CEST (UTC+02:00)	Cassani (yellow card) 24'; Parolo 55', (yellow card) 78'; Marchionni (yellow card) 60'; Acquah (yellow card) 63'; Mirante (yellow card) 87'	Report	Zapata (yellow card) 76'; Albiol (yellow card) 79'	Stadium: Stadio Ennio Tardini; Attendance: 14,743; Referee: Mauro Bergonzi

13 April 2014 33	Napoli	4–2	Lazio	Naples
15:00 CEST (UTC+02:00)	Jorginho (yellow card) 2'; Higuaín (yellow card) 10', (goal) 49' (pen.), 67', 90+4'; Mertens 41', (yellow card) 45+1'; Britos (yellow card) 61'; Fernández (yellow card) 89'	Report	Cana (yellow card) 13' (yellow-red card) 48'; Lulić 21'; Ledesma (yellow card) 45'; Onazi 82'	Stadium: Stadio San Paolo; Attendance: 39,987; Referee: Luca Banti

19 April 2014 34	Udinese	1–1	Napoli	Udine
15:00 CEST (UTC+02:00)	Pinzi (yellow card) 1'; Pereyra (yellow card) 37'; Fernandes 54'	Report	Fernández (yellow card) 20' (yellow-red card) 89'; Callejón 39'; Behrami (yellow card) 65'; Jorginho (yellow card) 76'	Stadium: Stadio Friuli; Attendance: 16,219; Referee: Gianpaolo Calvarese

26 April 2014 35	Internazionale	0–0	Napoli	Milan
20:45 CEST (UTC+02:00)	Hernanes (yellow card) 61'	Report	Britos (yellow card) 26'; Henrique (yellow card) 37'; Ghoulam (yellow card) 82'	Stadium: San Siro; Attendance: 47,119; Referee: Nicola Rizzoli

6 May 2014 36	Napoli	3–0	Cagliari	Naples
21:00 CEST (UTC+02:00)	Mertens 33' (pen.); Pandev 43'; Džemaili 57', (yellow card) 90'; Mesto (yellow card) 67'; Britos (yellow card) 82'	Report	Conti (yellow card) 32'; Silvestri (red card) 54'; Rossettini (yellow card) 82'; Dessena (yellow card) 84'	Stadium: Stadio San Paolo; Attendance: 42,013; Referee: Davide Ghersini

11 May 2014 37	Sampdoria	2–5	Napoli	Genoa
15:00 CEST (UTC+02:00)	Éder 30'; Mustafi (yellow card) 63'; Wszołek 88'	Report	Zapata 19'; Insigne 27'; Callejón 32'; Hamšík 47'; Mustafi 61' (o.g.)	Stadium: Stadio Luigi Ferraris; Attendance: 20,651; Referee: Daniele Chiffi

18 May 2014 38	Napoli	5–1	Hellas Verona	Naples
20:45 CEST (UTC+02:00)	Callejón 5', (yellow card) 21'; Zapata 13', 25'; Radošević (yellow card) 59'; Mertens 62', 77'	Report	Agostini (yellow card) 54'; Iturbe 66'	Stadium: Stadio San Paolo; Attendance: 10,000; Referee: Luca Pairetto

=== Coppa Italia ===
15 January 2014 Round of 16	Napoli	3–1	Atalanta	Naples
21:00 CET (UTC+01:00)	Callejón 15', 80'; Insigne 72'; Albiol (yellow card) 82'	Report	De Luca 13'; Benalouane (yellow card) 54'; Cazzola (yellow card) 63'; Yepes (yellow card) 72' (red card) 75'; Livaja (yellow card) 82'	Stadium: Stadio San Paolo; Attendance: 35,000; Referee: Andrea De Marco

29 January 2014 Quarter-finals	Napoli	1–0	Lazio	Naples
20:45 CET (UTC+01:00)	Jorginho (yellow card) 15'; Higuaín 82', (yellow card) 84'	Report	Lulić (yellow card) 88'	Stadium: Stadio San Paolo; Attendance: 42,131; Referee: Luca Banti

5 February 2014 Semi-finals; First leg	Roma	3–2	Napoli	Rome
20:45 CET (UTC+01:00)	Gervinho 13', 88'; Strootman 32'; Nainggolan (yellow card) 39'	Report	De Sanctis 47' (o.g.); Mertens 70'; Inler (yellow card) 85'	Stadium: Stadio Olimpico; Attendance: 30,000; Referee: Mauro Bergonzi

12 February 2014 Semi-finals; Second leg	Napoli	3–0 (5–3 agg.)	Roma	Naples
20:45 CET (UTC+01:00)	Callejón 33', (yellow card) 74'; Higuaín 48'; Jorginho 51'; Maggio (yellow card) 57'	Report	Benatia (yellow card) 15'; Ljajić (yellow card) 21'; Strootman (yellow card) 79' (red card) 79'; Castán (yellow card) 83'	Stadium: Stadio San Paolo; Attendance: 42,231; Referee: Gianluca Rocchi

3 May 2014 Final	Fiorentina	1–3	Napoli	Rome
21:00 CEST (UTC+02:00)	Valero (yellow card) 10'; Vargas 28'; Iličić (yellow card) 40'; Tomović (yellow card) 48'; Fernández (yellow card) 65'	Report	Insigne 11', 17'; Albiol (yellow card) 36'; Inler (yellow card) 50' (yellow-red card) 79'; Reina (yellow card) 81'; Mertens 90+2'	Stadium: Stadio Olimpico; Attendance: 65,000; Referee: Daniele Orsato

=== UEFA Champions League ===
==== Group stage ====
Pos	Team	Pld	W	D	L	GF	GA	GD	Pts	Qualification	DOR	ARS	NAP	MAR
1	(Germany) Borussia Dortmund	6	4	0	2	11	6	+5	12 (Note: Tied on head-to-head points (6). Head-to-head goal difference: Borussia Dortmund +1, Arsenal 0, Napoli −1.)	Advance to knockout phase	—	0–1	3–1	3–0
2	(England) Arsenal	6	4	0	2	8	5	+3	12	Advance to knockout phase	1–2	—	2–0	2–0
3	(Italy) Napoli	6	4	0	2	10	9	+1	12	Transfer to Europa League	2–1	2–0	—	3–2
4	(France) Marseille	6	0	0	6	5	14	−9	0		1–2	1–2	1–2	—

Source: UEFA
Notes:

18 September 2013 1	Napoli (Italy)	2–1	(Germany) Borussia Dortmund	Naples, Italy
20:45 CEST (UTC+02:00)	Higuaín 29'; Behrami (yellow card) 33'; Britos (yellow card) 37'; Insigne 67', (yellow card) 68'	Report	Schmelzer (yellow card) 39'; Weidenfeller (red card) 45+1'; Zúñiga 87' (o.g.)	Stadium: Stadio San Paolo; Attendance: 55,766; Referee: Pedro Proença (Portugal)

1 October 2013 2	Arsenal (England)	2–0	(Italy) Napoli	London, England
20:45 CEST (UTC+02:00)	Özil 8'; Giroud 15'	Report		Stadium: Emirates Stadium; Attendance: 59,536; Referee: Milorad Mažić (Serbia)

22 October 2013 3	Marseille (France)	1–2	(Italy) Napoli	Marseille, France
20:45 CEST (UTC+02:00)	Cheyrou (yellow card) 44'; Payet (yellow card) 45'; A. Ayew 86'; J. Ayew (yellow card) 89'	Report	Callejón 42'; Zapata 67'	Stadium: Stade Vélodrome; Attendance: 39,790; Referee: Cüneyt Çakır (Turkey)

6 November 2013 4	Napoli (Italy)	3–2	(France) Marseille	Naples, Italy
20:45 CET (UTC+01:00)	Inler 22'; Higuaín 24', 75'; Fernández (yellow card) 34'	Report	A. Ayew 10'; Thauvin 64'; Payet (yellow card) 77'; Romao (yellow card) 80'	Stadium: Stadio San Paolo; Attendance: 39,148; Referee: Sergei Karasev (Russia)

26 November 2013 5	Borussia Dortmund (Germany)	3–1	(Italy) Napoli	Dortmund, Germany
20:45 CET (UTC+01:00)	Reus 10' (pen.); Kehl (yellow card) 38'; Błaszczykowski 60'; Aubameyang 78'	Report	Fernández (yellow card) 9'; Higuaín (yellow card) 11'; Albiol (yellow card) 36'; Pandev (yellow card) 38'; Insigne 71'	Stadium: Signal Iduna Park; Attendance: 65,829; Referee: Carlos Velasco Carballo (Spain)

11 December 2013 6	Napoli (Italy)	2–0	(England) Arsenal	Naples, Italy
20:45 CET (UTC+01:00)	Mertens (yellow card) 36'; Džemaili (yellow card) 41'; Higuaín 73'; Fernández (yellow card) 84'; Callejón 90+3'	Report	Arteta (yellow card) 62' (yellow-red card) 76'; Giroud (yellow card) 67'; Ramsey (yellow card) 84'	Stadium: Stadio San Paolo; Attendance: 34,027; Referee: Viktor Kassai (Hungary)

=== UEFA Europa League ===
==== Knockout phase ====
===== Round of 32 =====
20 February 2014 First leg	Swansea City (England)	0–0	(Italy) Napoli	Swansea, Wales
21:05 CET (UTC+01:00)	Pablo (yellow card) 56'; De Guzmán (yellow card) 85'	Report	Insigne (yellow card) 59'; Maggio (yellow card) 71'; Hamšík (yellow card) 72'	Stadium: Liberty Stadium; Attendance: 19,567; Referee: Ivan Bebek (Croatia)

27 February 2014 Second leg	Napoli (Italy)	3–1 (3–1 agg.)	(England) Swansea City	Naples, Italy
19:00 CET (UTC+01:00)	Insigne 17'; Higuaín 78'; Inler (yellow card) 85', (goal) 90+3'	Report	De Guzmán 30'; Cañas (yellow card) 47'; Chico (yellow card) 54'; Taylor (yellow card) 90+1'	Stadium: Stadio San Paolo; Attendance: 31,121; Referee: Ovidiu Haţegan (Romania)

===== Round of 16 =====
13 March 2014 First leg	Porto (Portugal)	1–0	(Italy) Napoli	Porto, Portugal
19:00 CET (UTC+01:00)	Martínez 57'; Alex Sandro (yellow card) 70'	Report	Réveillère (yellow card) 59'; Behrami (yellow card) 71'	Stadium: Estádio do Dragão; Attendance: 25,520; Referee: Pavel Královec (Czech Republic)

20 March 2014 Second leg	Napoli (Italy)	2–2 (2–3 agg.)	(Portugal) Porto	Naples, Italy
21.05 CET (UTC+01:00)	Pandev 21'; Henrique (yellow card) 52'; Behrami (yellow card) 70'; Zapata 90+2'	Report	Ghilas 69'; Quaresma 76'; Fernando (yellow card) 90'	Stadium: Stadio San Paolo; Attendance: 54,145; Referee: Martin Atkinson (England)

== Statistics ==
=== Appearances and goals ===
No.	Pos	Nat	Player	Total		Serie A		Coppa Italia		Champions League		Europa League	
No.	Pos	Nat	Player	Apps	Goals	Apps	Goals	Apps	Goals	Apps	Goals	Apps	Goals
Goalkeepers
1	GK	(Brazil) BRA	Rafael	11	0	7+1	0	1	0	1	0	1	0
15	GK	(Italy) ITA	Roberto Colombo	1	0	0+1	0	0	0	0	0	0	0
25	GK	(Spain) ESP	Pepe Reina	43	0	30	0	4	0	5	0	3+1	0
80	GK	(Spain) ESP	Toni Doblas	2	0	1+1	0	0	0	0	0	0	0
Defenders
2	DF	(France) FRA	Anthony Réveillère	18	0	13	0	3	0	0	0	2	0
4	DF	(Brazil) BRA	Henrique	17	1	8+3	1	1+1	0	0	0	4	0
5	DF	(Uruguay) URU	Miguel Britos	22	1	15+1	1	1	0	2	0	2+1	0
11	DF	(Italy) ITA	Christian Maggio	33	0	22	0	4	0	5	0	2	0
16	DF	(Italy) ITA	Giandomenico Mesto	14	0	10+1	0	0	0	1+2	0	0	0
18	DF	(Colombia) COL	Juan Zúñiga	8	0	4+2	0	0	0	2	0	0	0
21	DF	(Argentina) ARG	Federico Fernández	36	0	25+1	0	4	0	4+1	0	1	0
31	DF	(Algeria) ALG	Faouzi Ghoulam	21	0	14+1	0	2+1	0	0	0	3	0
33	DF	(Spain) ESP	Raúl Albiol	46	1	30+2	1	5	0	6	0	3	0
95	DF	(Poland) POL	Igor Łasicki	1	0	0+1	0	0	0	0	0	0	0
Midfielders
8	MF	(Brazil) BRA	Jorginho	19	1	12+3	0	4	1	0	0	0	0
13	MF	(Italy) ITA	Davide Bariti	3	0	0+2	0	0+1	0	0	0	0	0
17	MF	(Slovakia) SVK	Marek Hamšík	41	7	23+5	7	4+1	0	3+1	0	2+2	0
20	MF	(Switzerland) SUI	Blerim Džemaili	29	6	18+6	6	0+1	0	3	0	1	0
22	MF	(Croatia) CRO	Josip Radošević	9	0	0+8	0	1	0	0	0	0	0
85	MF	(Switzerland) SUI	Valon Behrami	33	0	16+5	0	0+3	0	5+1	0	3	0
88	MF	(Switzerland) SUI	Gökhan Inler	45	4	30+2	2	5	0	4+1	1	3	1
Forwards
7	FW	(Spain) ESP	José Callejón	52	20	32+5	15	5	3	6	2	3+1	0
9	FW	(Argentina) ARG	Gonzalo Higuaín	46	24	28+4	17	4+1	2	5	4	4	1
14	FW	(Belgium) BEL	Dries Mertens	47	13	21+12	11	1+3	2	4+2	0	1+3	0
19	FW	(North Macedonia) MKD	Goran Pandev	41	8	17+12	7	1+2	0	4+1	0	2+2	1
24	FW	(Italy) ITA	Lorenzo Insigne	51	9	25+11	3	4+1	3	2+4	2	4	1
91	FW	(Colombia) COL	Duván Zapata	22	7	5+11	5	1	0	0+3	1	0+2	1
Players transferred out during the season
3	DF	(Brazil) BRA	Bruno Uvini	1	0	0+1	0	0	0	0	0	0	0
27	DF	(Colombia) COL	Pablo Armero	18	0	9+5	0	0	0	4	0	0	0
28	DF	(Italy) ITA	Paolo Cannavaro	4	0	2+2	0	0	0	0	0	0	0

Last updated: 18 May 2014
Source: Competitions

=== Goalscorers ===
Rank	No.	Pos	Nat	Name	Serie A	Coppa Italia	UEFA CL	UEFA EL	Total
1	9	FW	(Argentina)	Gonzalo Higuaín	17	2	4	1	24
2	7	FW	(Spain)	José Callejón	15	3	2	0	20
3	14	FW	(Belgium)	Dries Mertens	11	2	0	0	13
4	24	FW	(Italy)	Lorenzo Insigne	3	3	2	1	9
5	19	FW	(North Macedonia)	Goran Pandev	7	0	0	1	8
6	17	MF	(Slovakia)	Marek Hamšík	7	0	0	0	7
6	91	FW	(Colombia)	Duván Zapata	5	0	1	1	7
8	20	MF	(Switzerland)	Blerim Džemaili	6	0	0	0	6
9	88	MF	(Switzerland)	Gökhan Inler	2	0	1	1	4
10	4	DF	(Brazil)	Henrique	1	0	0	0	1
10	5	DF	(Uruguay)	Miguel Britos	1	0	0	0	1
10	8	MF	(Brazil)	Jorginho	0	1	0	0	1
10	33	DF	(Spain)	Raúl Albiol	1	0	0	0	1
Own goal					1	1	0	0	2
Totals					77	12	10	5	104

Last updated: 18 May 2014
