= Gökhan Inler =

Swiss footballer (born 1984)

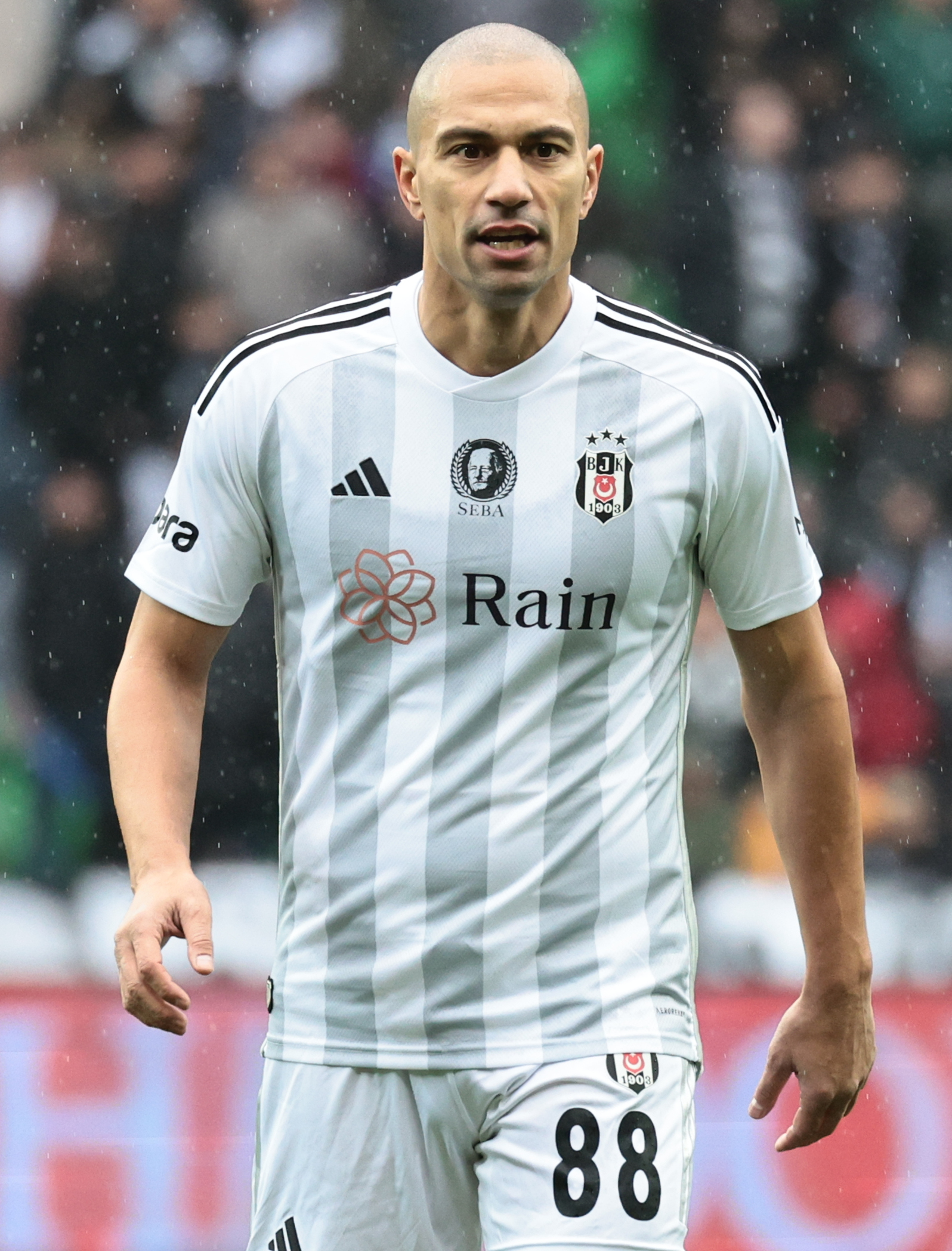
- Inler with Beşiktaş in 2023

Personal information
- Full name: Gökhan Inler
- Date of birth: 27 June 1984 (age 42)
- Place of birth: Olten, Switzerland
- Height: 1.83 m (6 ft 0 in)
- Position: Central midfielder

Team information
- Current team: Udinese (technical director)

Youth career
- 1992–1998: Olten
- 1998–2002: Solothurn
- 2002–2005: Basel

Senior career*
Years	Team	Apps	(Gls)
2005–2006	Aarau	25	(3)
2006–2007	Zürich	52	(3)
2007–2011	Udinese	141	(6)
2011–2015	Napoli	118	(9)
2015–2016	Leicester City	5	(0)
2016–2017	Beşiktaş	14	(0)
2017–2020	İstanbul Başakşehir	44	(1)
2020–2023	Adana Demirspor	62	(3)
2023–2024	Beşiktaş	0	(0)
Total		461	(25)

International career
2005	Switzerland U21	3	(0)
2006	Turkey U21	1	(0)
2006–2015	Switzerland	89	(7)
- * Club domestic league appearances and goals

Gökhan Inler (Turkish: İnler, born 27 June 1984) is a Swiss former professional footballer who played as a central midfielder. He is currently in charge as a technical director of Italian football club Udinese.

Inler began his professional career with Basel and later joined Aarau and Zürich, winning the Swiss Super League in both of his seasons with the latter. After four seasons with Udinese in the Italian Serie A, he joined Napoli in 2011, where he twice won the Coppa Italia.

Inler played under-21 football for both Switzerland and Turkey. He made his debut for the Switzerland senior team in 2006 and has since earned 89 caps, scoring seven goals, making him the nation's fifth-most capped player of all time. He represented the squad at UEFA Euro 2008 and two FIFA World Cups, captaining the Swiss in Brazil in 2014.

== Club career ==
=== Early career ===
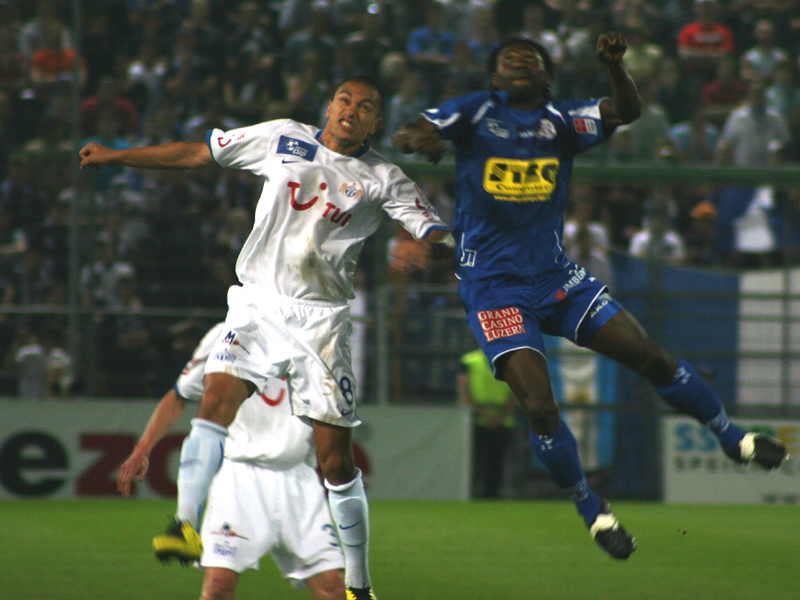
Inler battling for a header against Luzern in 2007

Born in Olten in the Canton of Solothurn, Inler began his career at Basel, later Aarau. On 20 March 2005, he made his Swiss Super League debut in a 2–3 home defeat against Grasshoppers. In January 2006, he was signed by Zürich and was part of the 2005–06 and 2007–08 Swiss championship-winning teams.

=== Udinese ===
==== 2007–08 season ====
Inler joined Udinese of the Italian Serie A in July 2007 after the Udine-based club met a buy-out clause in his Zürich contract, joining for an undisclosed fee and signing a five-year contract. He scored his first goal for Udinese in a 2–1 win over Torino, netting in the 52nd minute to make the score 2–0 for Udinese. On 30 March 2008, Inler scored his second Serie A goal, opening the scoring in an eventual 3–1 win over Fiorentina. Inler also set-up striker Antonio Di Natale for the winning goal later in the match. In Inler's first season in Italy, he started all domestic games for Udinese, scoring two goals and providing two assists. Inler and Udinese had a successful season, finishing seventh in Serie A and thus earning a berth in the first round of next season's UEFA Cup.

==== 2008–09 season ====
On the opening day of the 2008–09 Serie A season, Inler scored the third goal of a 3–1 win over Palermo and provided an assist for one of Antonio Di Natale's two goals. On 18 September, Inler then scored in the first leg of a UEFA Cup qualifying round game away against Borussia Dortmund, a game Udinese won 0–2. Despite then losing the home leg 2–0 courtesy of two goals from Tamás Hajnal, Udinese progressed after winning 4–3 on penalties, with Inler converting his kick. Inler featured in all four of Udinese's group stage games as they finished first in their group with nine points. In the round of 16, Inler started both legs against reigning champions Zenit Saint Petersburg, as Udinese won 2–1 on aggregate against the Russians. In the quarterfinal round against Werder Bremen, Udinese lost the first leg 3–1 away from home, but in the second leg, Inler struck early on for the hosts, netting a dipping shot from over 25 yards (23 m) out. Diego equalised for the Germans before Fabio Quagliarella netted twice before the break to bring the aggregate score to 4–4. Two second-half goals for Bremen, however, meant that the hosts were knocked out at the quarterfinal stage.

Inler's goal against Palermo proved to be his only league goal of the season, but he provided three more assists, including one helper in a stunning 6–2 victory over Cagliari on the final matchday of the season. The win assured that Udinese once again finished seventh in Serie A, this time five points behind Roma for the last European spot.

==== 2009–10 season ====
Udinese and Inler found the next season much more difficult. The playmaker did not have a successful season following his breakout campaign in the UEFA Cup from the previous year. He failed to score in 33 Serie A appearances and only provided one assist to Antonio Di Natale in a 2–1 loss to eventual champions Inter Milan. Udinese only secured their Serie A safety on the penultimate day of the season after a 2–2 draw at Cagliari, which also saw the hosts confirm their Serie A place for the next season. Four days later, Inler scored for Switzerland in a 1–1 draw against Italy in an international friendly in preparation for the 2010 FIFA World Cup, with former teammate Fabio Quagliarella scoring for the reigning world champions.

==== 2010–11 season ====
Inler and Udinese continued their poor form from the previous year to begin the 2010–11 Serie A campaign, losing four of their first five games, though fortunes quickly started to turn around for each. Udinese went on a streak of six-straight games without a loss, winning four in a row; in one game, Inler set up Antonio Floro Flores to level for the hosts against Cagliari, a game ending in a 1–1 draw on 7 November 2010. Following the winter break, Inler grabbed an assist in Udinese's 2–0 win over Chievo on 6 January 2011. In an enthralling game at the San Siro the next Sunday, Inler provided Antonio Di Natale with one of his goals in a 4–4 draw against eventual champions Milan. Inler then scored his first goal of the season in a 3–0 win over Cesena. The result meant that Udinese had not lost in 2011, a span of eight games, and moved up to sixth in the league table. Udinese drew their next game against Brescia before winning their next four, including a 7–0 thrashing of Palermo away from home. In the 13th and final game of their unbeaten streak, Inler scored against Catania in a 2–0 win. After finally losing, a 2–0 defeat to Lecce, Inler continued his fine run of form, scoring in a 2–1 win over title-chasers Napoli. Udinese drew with Milan on 22 May, confirming the former's fourth-place finish and Italy's final UEFA Champions League berth with one game remaining in the season.

=== Napoli ===
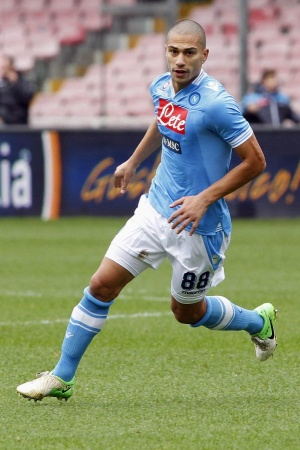
Inler playing for Napoli in 2013

Because of his good form in Udinese, helping them finish fourth in the 2010–11 Serie A table and securing a Champions League playoff spot, transfer speculation was rife that Inler would be on the move. In May 2011, Udinese agreed a deal with Napoli in a deal for the player worth €13 million. In July, Inler agreed personal terms with Napoli and was unveiled on 11 July, being presented in an unconventional manner, wearing a lion mask to hide his identity and sporting the jersey number 88. He made his Napoli debut in their 3–1 away win at Cesena on 10 September. Inler provided an assist for Federico Fernández in a 3–2 defeat to Bayern Munich in the group stages of the Champions League on 2 November. In the same game, he was involved in a challenge with Bastian Schweinsteiger that resulted in the German international requiring surgery for a broken collarbone. On 7 December, Inler scored his first goal for both his new club and in the Champions League; he opened the scoring with a left-footed drive in a 0–2 away win over Villarreal in the final game of the group stage phase, a win that took Napoli through to the knockout stages of the competition.

In Napoli's Round of 16 tie against Chelsea, Inler scored a long-range drive in the second leg at Stamford Bridge to send the game into extra-time. A late goal from Branislav Ivanović, however, ensured Chelsea progressed to the quarterfinals 5–4 on aggregate. On 25 April 2012, Napoli headed to the Stadio Via del Mare to face Lecce, where Inler provided both assists for goals by Marek Hamšík and Edinson Cavani, helping Napoli climb to fourth in Serie A standings. Later on in the season, Inler played in the Coppa Italia Final against Scudetto winners Juventus, winning his first piece of silverware with the Partenopei after they defeated league-champions Juve 2–0.

On 3 May 2014, Inler was sent off in Napoli's victory over Fiorentina in the 2014 Coppa Italia Final.

=== Leicester City ===
On 19 August 2015, Inler signed for Premier League club Leicester City on a three-year contract for an undisclosed fee. He made his debut three days later, replacing Danny Drinkwater for the final ten minutes of a 1–1 draw with Tottenham Hotspur at the King Power Stadium. Due to the good performances of Drinkwater and N'Golo Kanté, Inler totalled only seven Leicester appearances by the end of the calendar year. As a result, Inler was not called up to the Switzerland squad for Euro 2016. Nevertheless, he played the minimum five league games required to be eligible for a winner's medal when Leicester became 2015–16 Premier League champions.

=== Beşiktaş ===
On 31 August 2016, Inler signed a three-year contract with Süper Lig club Beşiktaş.

=== İstanbul Başakşehir ===
In the summer of 2017, after spending one season at Beşiktaş, Inler moved to league rivals İstanbul Başakşehir on a free transfer. He was released at the end of his contract on 19 August 2020.

== International career ==
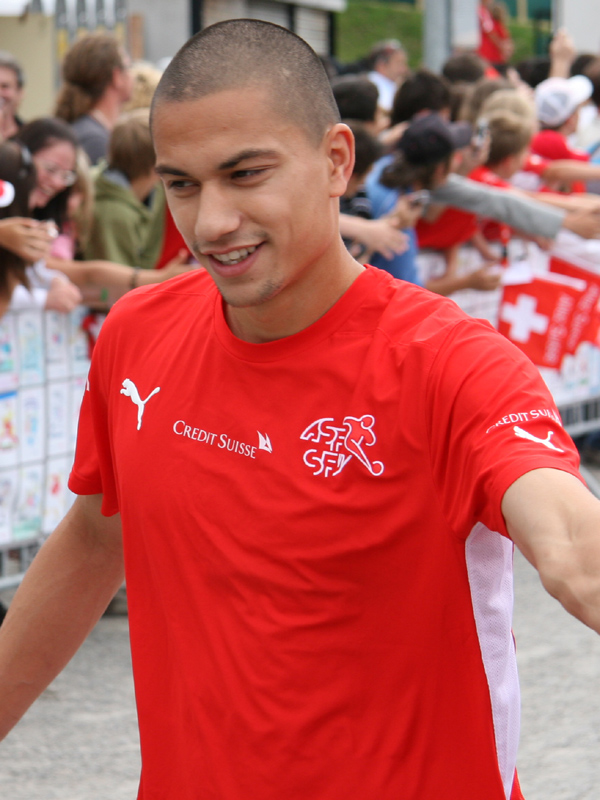
Inler with Switzerland in 2008

Inler played for the Swiss and Turkish national under-21 teams before debuting for the Swiss senior team on 2 September 2006 in an exhibition game against Venezuela in Basel. Inler played all of Switzerland's matches at UEFA Euro 2008 in which they were eliminated at the group stage on home soil.

Due to the absence of regular captain Alexander Frei on 16 June 2010, Inler captained Switzerland in a 1–0 victory against Spain in the group stage of the 2010 FIFA World Cup. Frei returned for the second group game, but Inler was again the captain in the third, a goalless draw with Honduras. After Frei's retirement in 2011, Inler became the Swiss captain, and played all four matches as they reached the last 16 of the 2014 FIFA World Cup. He was left out of the Swiss squad for UEFA Euro 2016 due to his lack of game time at Leicester City during the 2015–16 season.

== Style of play ==
A hard-working, tenacious, and tactically versatile midfielder, Inler is capable of aiding his team both defensively and offensively; an intelligent player, he is known both for his stamina and his movements off the ball, although his most prominent trait is his powerful and accurate striking ability from distance with both feet, and also from set pieces, which enables him to contribute to his team's offensive play with goals from midfield. Primarily a ball-winner, Inler is usually deployed as a central or defensive midfielder, where he is also capable of functioning creatively as a deep-lying playmaker in front of the defensive line, due to his vision, passing range, and ability to control the tempo of his team's play; his long passing accuracy allows him to effectively switch the play and create chances for teammates after winning back possession. Due to his height and physical attributes, he is also effective in the air.

== Coaching career ==
On 13 June 2024, Inler has been appointed as a Technical Director at Udinese.

== Personal life ==
Inler, born and brought up in Switzerland, has parents of Turkish origin. He is a lifelong fan of Beşiktaş. In an interview, he stated that when he was young he used to go to Beşiktaş's training camps, which were close to the house he grew up in Switzerland.

== Career statistics ==
=== Club ===
As of 4 August 2020

Appearances and goals by club, season and competition
Club	Season	League			National cup		League cup		Europe		Other		Total	
Club	Season	Division	Apps	Goals	Apps	Goals	Apps	Goals	Apps	Goals	Apps	Goals	Apps	Goals
Aarau	2004–05	Swiss Super League	14	3	0	0	—		0	0	—		14	3
Aarau	2005–06	Swiss Super League	11	0	0	0	—		0	0	—		11	0
Aarau	Total		25	3	0	0	—		0	0	—		25	3
Zürich	2005–06	Swiss Super League	17	2	0	0	—		0	0	—		17	2
Zürich	2006–07	Swiss Super League	35	1	0	0	—		2 (Note: Appearances in UEFA Champions League)	0	—		37	1
Zürich	Total		52	3	0	0	—		2	0	—		54	3
Udinese	2007–08	Serie A	37	2	3	0	—		—		—		40	2
Udinese	2008–09	Serie A	36	1	1	0	—		12 (Note: Appearances in UEFA Cup)	2	—		49	3
Udinese	2009–10	Serie A	33	0	4	1	—		—		—		37	1
Udinese	2010–11	Serie A	35	3	1	0	—		—		—		36	3
Udinese	Total		141	6	9	1	—		12	2	—		162	9
Napoli	2011–12	Serie A	36	0	5	0	—		8	2	—		49	2
Napoli	2012–13	Serie A	31	6	1	0	—		6 (Note: Appearance(s) in UEFA Europa League)	0	1 (Note: Appearance in Supercoppa Italiana)	0	39	6
Napoli	2013–14	Serie A	32	2	5	0	—		8 (Note: Five appearances and one goal in UEFA Champions League, three appearances and one goal in UEFA Europa League)	2	—		45	4
Napoli	2014–15	Serie A	19	1	2	0	—		11	0	1	0	33	1
Napoli	Total		118	9	13	0	—		33	4	2	0	166	13
Leicester City	2015–16	Premier League	5	0	2	0	3	0	—		—		10	0
Beşiktaş	2016–17	Süper Lig	14	0	6	0	—		10 (Note: Five appearances in UEFA Champions League, five appearances in UEFA Europa League)	0	—		30	0
İstanbul Başakşehir	2017–18	Süper Lig	22	1	3	0	—		10 (Note: Four appearances in UEFA Champions League, six appearances in UEFA Europa League)	0	—		35	1
İstanbul Başakşehir	2018–19	Süper Lig	12	0	4	0	—		1	0	—		17	0
İstanbul Başakşehir	2019–20	Süper Lig	10	0	2	0	—		0	0	—		12	0
İstanbul Başakşehir	Total		44	1	9	0	—		11	0	—		64	1
Career total			400	22	39	1	3	0	68	6	2	0	512	29

=== International ===
Appearances and goals by national team and year
National team	Year	Apps	Goals
Switzerland	2006	3	0
Switzerland	2007	10	1
Switzerland	2008	13	0
Switzerland	2009	7	0
Switzerland	2010	12	3
Switzerland	2011	9	0
Switzerland	2012	9	2
Switzerland	2013	7	0
Switzerland	2014	11	0
Switzerland	2015	8	1
Total		89	7

Scores and results list Templatonia's goal tally first, score column indicates score after each Inler goal.

List of international goals scored by Gökhan Inler
No.	Date	Venue	Opponent	Score	Result	Competition
1	22 March 2007	Lockhart Stadium, Fort Lauderdale, USA	Jamaica	2–0	2–0	Friendly
2	3 March 2010	AFG Arena, St. Gallen, Switzerland	Uruguay	1–0	1–3	Friendly
3	5 June 2010	Stade de Genève, Geneva, Switzerland	Italy	1–0	1–1	Friendly
4	12 October 2010	St. Jakob-Park, Basel, Switzerland	Wales	3–1	4–1	UEFA Euro 2012 qualifying
5	7 September 2012	Stožice Stadium, Ljubljana, Slovenia	Slovenia	2–0	2–0	2014 FIFA World Cup Qualification
6	11 September 2012	Swisspor Arena, Lucerne, Switzerland	Albania	2–0	2–0	2014 FIFA World Cup Qualification
7	9 October 2015	AFG Arena, St. Gallen, Switzerland	San Marino	2–0	7–0	UEFA Euro 2016 qualifying

== Honours ==
Zürich

- Swiss Super League: 2005–06, 2006–07

Napoli

- Coppa Italia: 2011–12, 2013–14
- Supercoppa Italiana: 2014

Leicester City

- Premier League: 2015–16

Beşiktaş

- Süper Lig: 2016–17
- Turkish Cup: 2023–24

İstanbul Başakşehir

- Süper Lig: 2019–20

Adana Demirspor

- TFF First League: 2020–21
