= Diamante Crispino =

Italian footballer (born 1994)

Personal information
- Date of birth: 5 September 1994 (age 32)
- Place of birth: Caserta, Italy
- Height: 1.88 m (6 ft 2 in)
- Position: Goalkeeper

Youth career
- Sporting Caivano
- –2013: Napoli

Senior career*
Years	Team	Apps	(Gls)
2013–2014	Napoli	0	(0)
2013–2014	→ Como (loan)	2	(0)
2014–2017	Como	51	(0)
2017–2019	Bisceglie	53	(0)
2019	Siracusa	16	(0)
2019–2020	Casertana	22	(0)
2020–2021	Virtus Francavilla	20	(0)
2021–2022	Pianese	13	(0)
2022–2023	Molfetta	21	(0)
2023–2024	Sora	5	(0)
2024–2025	Frattese	?	(0)
- * Club domestic league appearances and goals as of 8 October 2023

Diamante Crispino (born 5 September 1994) is a former Italian football player.

== Club career ==
He made his Serie C debut for Como on 22 December 2013 in a game against Pavia.

On 16 January 2019, he signed with Siracusa.

On 27 June 2019, Crispino signed with Casertana.

On 7 September 2020 he joined Virtus Francavilla on a 2-year contract.
