= Valon Behrami =

Swiss footballer (born 1985)

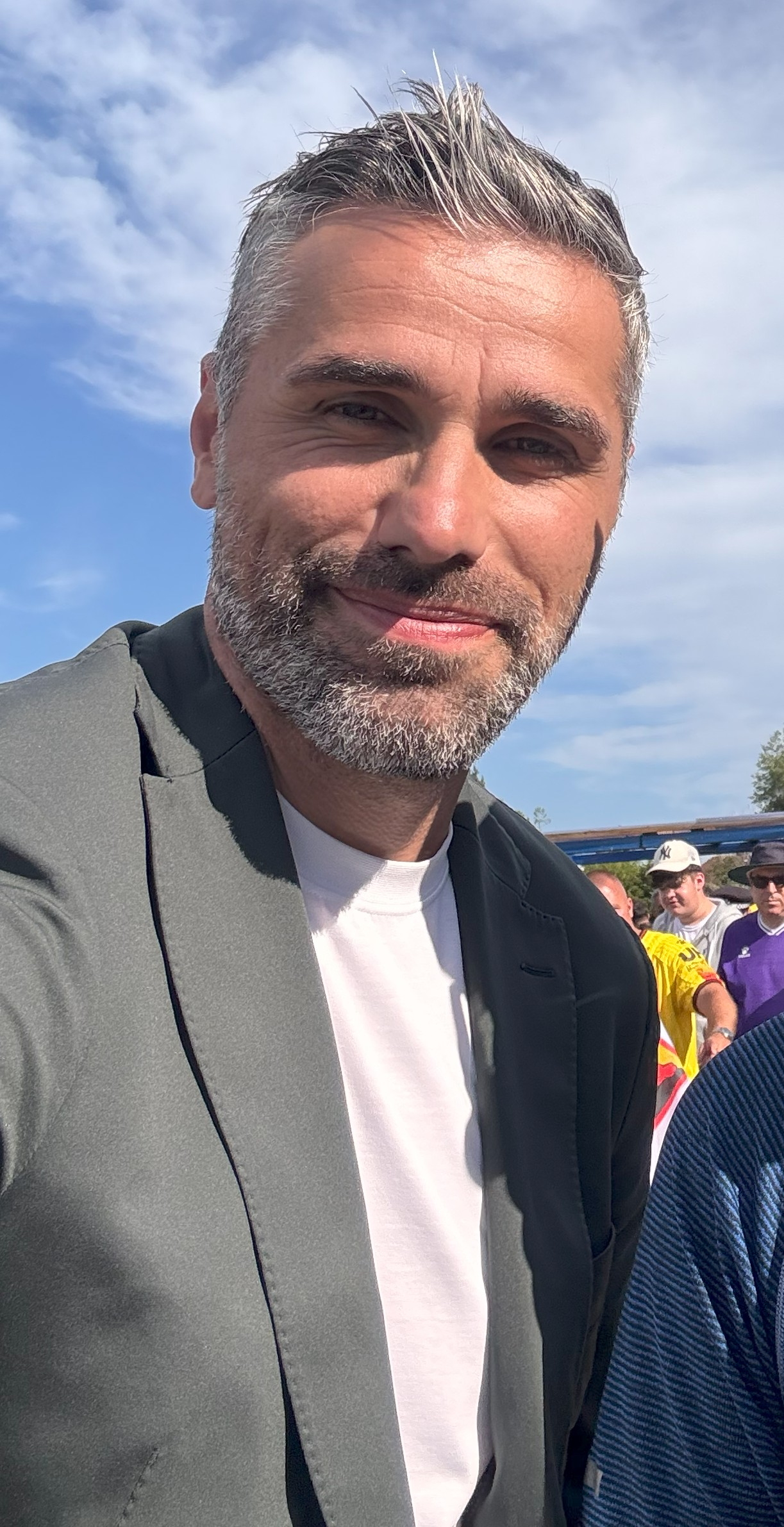
- Behrami in 2025.

Personal information
- Full name: Valon Behrami
- Date of birth: 19 April 1985 (age 41)
- Place of birth: Kosovska Mitrovica, Yugoslavia (present-day Kosovo)
- Height: 1.83 m (6 ft 0 in)
- Position: Midfielder

Youth career
- 1993–1997: Stabio
- 1997–2000: Chiasso
- 2000–2002: Lugano

Senior career*
| Years | Team | Apps | (Gls) |
| 2002–2003 | Lugano | 2 | (0) |
| 2003–2005 | Genoa | 24 | (0) |
| 2004–2005 | → Hellas Verona (loan) | 33 | (3) |
| 2005–2008 | Lazio | 65 | (4) |
| 2008–2011 | West Ham United | 58 | (4) |
| 2011–2012 | Fiorentina | 48 | (0) |
| 2012–2014 | Napoli | 54 | (0) |
| 2014–2015 | Hamburger SV | 22 | (0) |
| 2015–2017 | Watford | 43 | (0) |
| 2017–2019 | Udinese | 39 | (2) |
| 2019 | Sion | 4 | (0) |
| 2020–2022 | Genoa | 53 | (0) |
| 2022 | Brescia | 5 | (0) |
| Total | | 450 | (13) |

International career
| 2005–2018 | Switzerland | 83 | (2) |
- * Club domestic league appearances and goals

Valon Behrami (born 19 April 1985) is a Swiss former professional footballer who played as a midfielder. Despite starting his professional football career in Switzerland with FC Lugano, Behrami played mostly in Italy, though also played for two football clubs in England and one in Germany. In 2025 he was appointed as assistant to the Sporting Director at Watford FC.

Behrami was capped 83 times at international level by the Switzerland national team, playing at four FIFA World Cups, UEFA Euro 2008 and UEFA Euro 2016 from his debut in 2005 to his international retirement in 2018.

== Early life ==
Behrami was born to Kosovar Albanian parents in Mitrovica, Kosovo, at the time part of SR Serbia within SFR Yugoslavia. When he was five, his parents both lost their jobs; his mother Halime as a secretary and his father Ragip as a manager of a plastics company. As a result, Behrami along with his parents and older sister Valentina moved to Stabio, a village in Ticino, a canton in the Italian-speaking region of Switzerland. Behrami's mother described him as energetic: "As a child, running was Valon's favourite pastime – he just never got tired. Even now, he can hardly sit still for a second. He always needs a ball at his feet."

== Club career ==
=== Early career ===
Behrami started out playing football with Swiss club sides FC Stabio, FC Chiasso and FC Lugano. After a number of impressive appearances with Lugano, he was signed by Italian team Genoa in the 2003–04 season, and played for them in the Serie B championship. In January 2004 he joined Udinese along with Rodrigue Boisfer in exchange for Mohammed Gargo and Vittorio Micolucci, in flopped transfer price in co-ownership deal to create "paper" profit.

In the 2004–05 season, Genoa bought out Udinese' rights to the player and loaned him out to Verona, again in Serie B.

=== Lazio ===
After an impressive season with Verona, Lazio signed him on 25 July 2005, as first a co-ownership deal for €2.7 million. and Lazio bought him outright in January 2006, for the same price.

Despite his clearance hitting Rodrigo Taddei's head and ricocheting into Lazio's goal to concede their first goal of the match, his 92nd minute winning goal etched Behrami's name into Lazio's history books as they won the Derby della Capitale on 19 March 2008 and virtually finished the Scudetto hopes for rivals Roma.

=== West Ham United ===
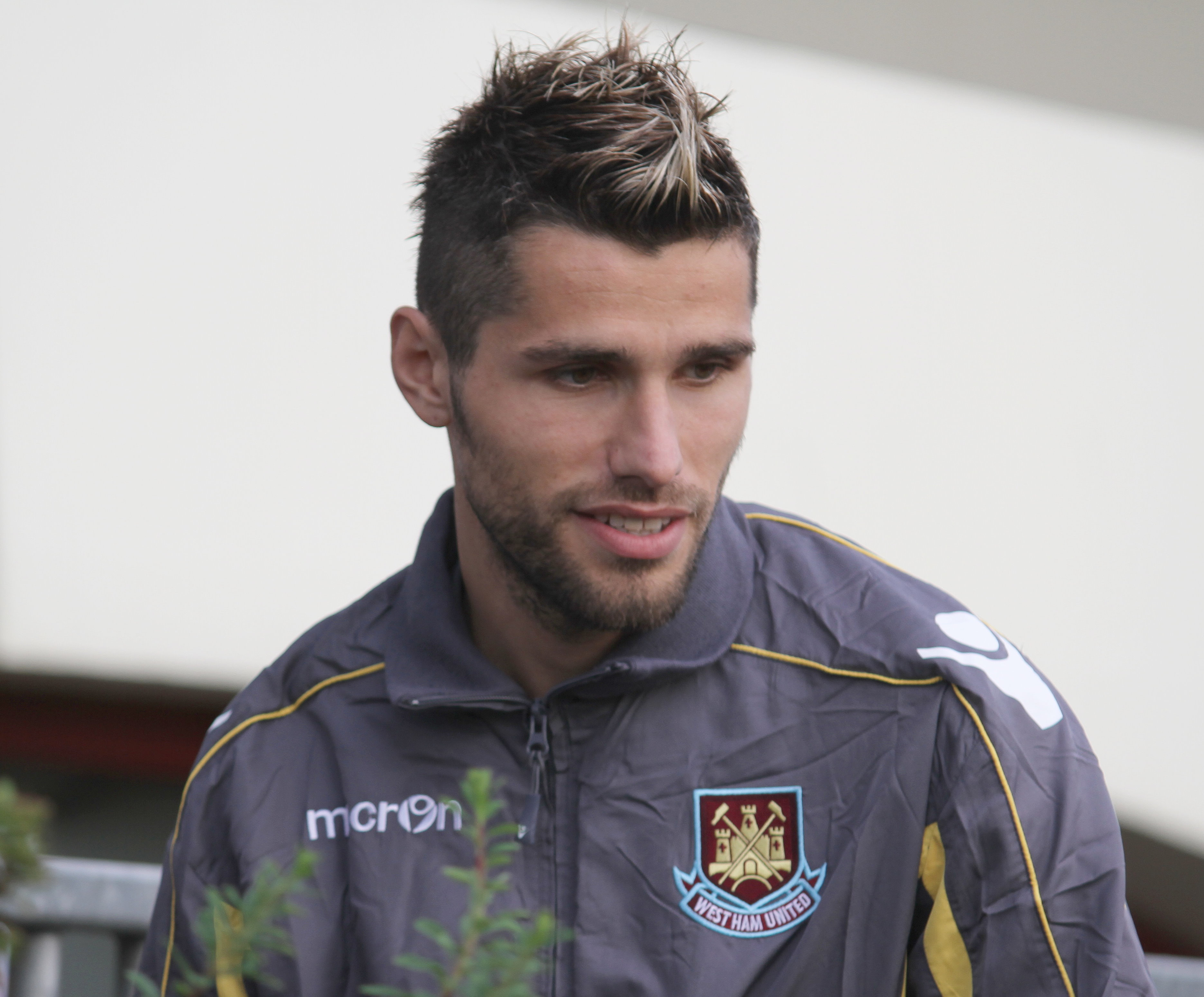
Behrami pictured at Upton Park, West Ham United's ground, on 11 September 2010

On 23 July 2008, West Ham United signed Behrami from Lazio, with the player signing a five-year contract for a fee of £5 million. Behrami made his debut for West Ham in the 2–1 home win over Wigan Athletic on16 August 2008. His versatility would see him become a vital part of West Ham's midfield, having begun the season as a stand in for captain Lucas Neill at right back. He scored his first goal for West Ham in the 1–0 away win against Sunderland on 23 November 2008.

During the home win over Manchester City on 1 March 2009, he suffered an anterior cruciate ligament injury in his left knee that required oxygen to be administered on the field during a six-minute break in play. His knee and ankle twisted badly when his studs caught in the turf resulting in a premature end to his 2008–09 season.

Behrami made his comeback as a substitute on 12 September 2009 against Wigan Athletic. His return was interrupted by injury again for a month from November. He scored his first and only goal of the 2009–10 league campaign with the opener in a 3–0 home win over relegation rivals Hull City on 20 February 2010.

=== Fiorentina ===
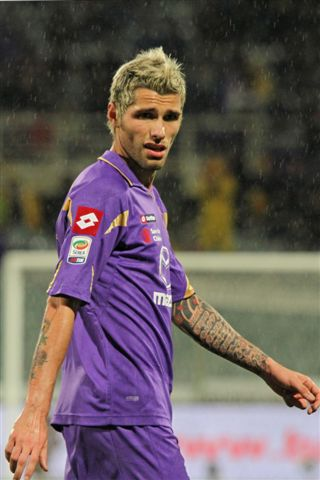
Behrami playing for Fiorentina

On 26 January 2011, Behrami moved to Fiorentina for an undisclosed fee, signing a three-and-a-half-year contract. He made his debut with Fiorentina on 29 January 2011, in a Serie A fixture against his former team Lazio.

=== Napoli ===
On 17 July 2012, Behrami and his Fiorentina teammate Alessandro Gamberini were signed by Napoli for undisclosed fees.

=== Hamburg ===
On 31 July 2014, Behrami flew into Germany to complete a medical ahead of his €4.5 million move to Hamburg. The subsequent bonuses could raise the fee to €6.5 million based on 20 appearances in his first season. He committed to a three-year contract with an option for a fourth. On 2 August 2014, the move was completed.

=== Watford ===
On 11 July 2015, Behrami watched on as his teammates drew 2–2 with AFC Wimbledon, later that afternoon the club confirmed Behrami signed a three-year contract with Watford.

=== Udinese ===
On 16 August 2017, Behrami signed a two-year deal with Italian club Udinese, who are owned by the Pozzo family just as his previous club Watford.

=== Sion ===
In July 2019, he joined Swiss club Sion. On 3 October 2019, his contract with Sion was terminated by mutual consent.

=== Return to Genoa ===
On 2 January 2020, Behrami joined Genoa for the second time. On 5 January, he came on in his debut as a substitute in a 2–1 home win against Sassuolo in the 72nd minute.

=== Brescia ===
On 31 January 2022, Behrami signed with Serie B club Brescia.

== International career ==
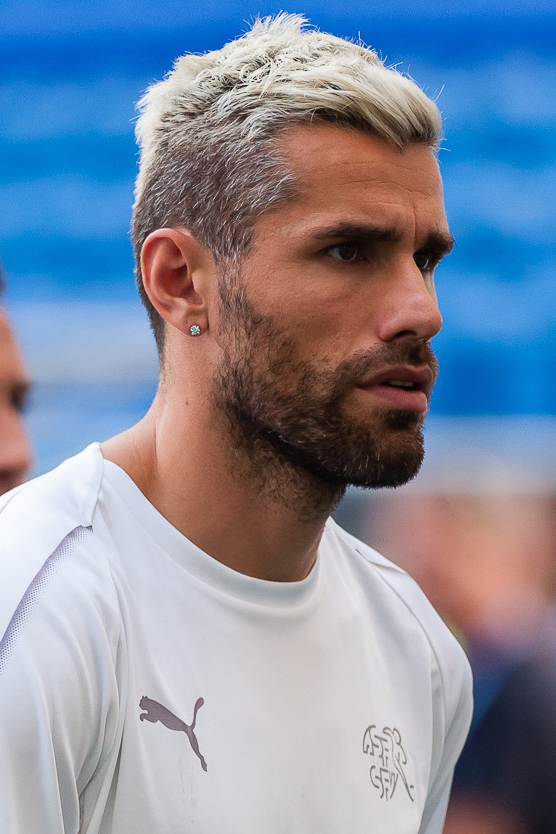
Behrami with Switzerland in 2018.

Behrami was capped for the Swiss national team at the Under-18, Under-19 and "A" levels; playing at FIFA World Cup in 2006, 2010, 2014 and 2018.

He received his first call-up to the senior team in October 2005, when Köbi Kuhn added him to the squad for World Cup qualifiers against France and the Republic of Ireland. He made his senior debut against France on 8 October 2005. Behrami scored a key goal against Turkey at the Stade de Suisse in the first leg of their 2006 World Cup qualifying playoff tie.

During the 2006 tournament, he suffered a groin injury which put him on the sidelines for the first two group matches. In the third match against South Korea, he was substituted late in the game in the 88th minute. He did not participate in the loss to Ukraine in the last 16. Behrami was in the starting eleven of Switzerland for all three matches during the 2008 UEFA European Championship, playing a total of 272 minutes. On 21 June, in the 2010 World Cup, after appearing to elbow Chilean player Arturo Vidal, Behrami was sent off with a red card in the second Group H match against Chile and became the first Swiss player to be sent off in a World Cup match. Behrami was included in the Switzerland 23-man squad for the 2018 FIFA World Cup. In their opening game, on 17 June, a 1–1 draw with Brazil, his performance was described as excellent, with note being made of his constant harassment of Brazil's Neymar. He became the first Swiss player to appear in four consecutive World Cup editions.

== Style of play ==
A defensive midfielder, Behrami is known for his tenacity and physicality on the pitch, as well as his ability to recover balls through his tackling; his physical and defensive qualities complemented the creative and technical abilities of compatriot Granit Xhaka in midfield at international level.

== Personal life ==
In July 2018 it became known that Behrami married his girlfriend, Swiss alpine ski racer Lara Gut, after only having been dating for a few months.

== Career statistics ==
=== Club ===
As of match played 5 December 2021

| Club | Season | League | | | National Cup | | League Cup | | Europe | | Other | | Total | |
| Club | Season | Division | Apps | Goals | Apps | Goals | Apps | Goals | Apps | Goals | Apps | Goals | Apps | Goals |
|---|---|---|---|---|---|---|---|---|---|---|---|---|---|---|
| Genoa | 2003–04 | Serie B | 24 | 0 | ? | ? | — | | — | | — | | 24 | 0 |
| Hellas Verona (loan) | 2004–05 | Serie B | 33 | 3 | ? | ? | — | | — | | — | | 33 | 3 |
| Lazio | 2005–06 | Serie A | 26 | 2 | 0 | 0 | — | | — | | — | | 26 | 2 |
| Lazio | 2006–07 | Serie A | 17 | 1 | 0 | 0 | — | | — | | — | | 17 | 1 |
| Lazio | 2007–08 | Serie A | 22 | 1 | 0 | 0 | — | | 5 | 0 | — | | 27 | 1 |
| Lazio | Total | | 65 | 4 | 0 | 0 | — | | 5 | 0 | — | | 70 | 4 |
| West Ham United | 2008–09 | Premier League | 24 | 1 | 2 | 1 | 1 | 0 | — | | — | | 27 | 2 |
| West Ham United | 2009–10 | Premier League | 27 | 1 | 1 | 0 | 0 | 0 | — | | — | | 28 | 1 |
| West Ham United | 2010–11 | Premier League | 7 | 2 | 0 | 0 | 1 | 0 | — | | — | | 8 | 2 |
| West Ham United | Total | | 58 | 4 | 3 | 1 | 2 | 0 | — | | — | | 63 | 5 |
| Fiorentina | 2010–11 | Serie A | 17 | 0 | 0 | 0 | — | | — | | — | | 17 | 0 |
| Fiorentina | 2011–12 | Serie A | 31 | 0 | 1 | 0 | — | | — | | — | | 32 | 0 |
| Fiorentina | Total | | 48 | 0 | 1 | 0 | — | | — | | — | | 49 | 0 |
| Napoli | 2012–13 | Serie A | 33 | 0 | 0 | 0 | — | | 3 | 0 | 1 (Note: Appearance in Supercoppa Italiana) | 0 | 37 | 0 |
| Napoli | 2013–14 | Serie A | 21 | 0 | 3 | 0 | — | | 9 | 0 | — | | 33 | 0 |
| Napoli | Total | | 54 | 0 | 3 | 0 | — | | 12 | 0 | 1 | 0 | 70 | 0 |
| Hamburger SV | 2014–15 | Bundesliga | 22 | 0 | 0 | 0 | — | | — | | — | | 22 | 0 |
| Watford | 2015–16 | Premier League | 21 | 0 | 1 | 0 | 0 | 0 | — | | — | | 22 | 0 |
| Watford | 2016–17 | Premier League | 27 | 0 | 0 | 0 | 0 | 0 | — | | — | | 27 | 0 |
| Watford | Total | | 48 | 0 | 1 | 0 | 0 | 0 | — | | — | | 49 | 0 |
| Udinese | 2017–18 | Serie A | 20 | 1 | 0 | 0 | — | | — | | — | | 20 | 1 |
| Udinese | 2018–19 | Serie A | 19 | 1 | 0 | 0 | — | | — | | — | | 19 | 1 |
| Udinese | Total | | 39 | 2 | 0 | 0 | — | | — | | – | | 39 | 2 |
| Sion | 2019–20 | Swiss Super League | 4 | 0 | 1 | 0 | — | | — | | — | | 5 | 0 |
| Genoa | 2019–20 | Serie A | 17 | 0 | 1 | 0 | — | | — | | — | | 18 | 0 |
| Genoa | 2020–21 | Serie A | 26 | 0 | 0 | 0 | — | | — | | — | | 26 | 0 |
| Genoa | 2021–22 | Serie A | 10 | 0 | 0 | 0 | — | | — | | — | | 10 | 0 |
| Genoa | Total | | 53 | 0 | 1 | 0 | — | | — | | – | | 54 | 0 |
| Career total | | | 419 | 13 | 10 | 1 | 2 | 0 | 17 | 0 | 1 | 0 | 449 | 14 |

=== International ===
| National team | Year | Apps | Goals |
|---|---|---|---|
Switzerland
| Switzerland | 2005 | 3 | 1 |
| Switzerland | 2006 | 4 | 0 |
| Switzerland | 2007 | 5 | 0 |
| Switzerland | 2008 | 12 | 1 |
| Switzerland | 2009 | 1 | 0 |
| Switzerland | 2010 | 3 | 0 |
| Switzerland | 2011 | 4 | 0 |
| Switzerland | 2012 | 6 | 0 |
| Switzerland | 2013 | 7 | 0 |
| Switzerland | 2014 | 11 | 0 |
| Switzerland | 2015 | 7 | 0 |
| Switzerland | 2016 | 10 | 0 |
| Switzerland | 2017 | 3 | 0 |
| Switzerland | 2018 | 7 | 0 |
| Total | | 83 | 2 |

==== International goals ====
Switzerland score listed first, score column indicates score after each Behrami goal.

International goals by date, venue, cap, opponent, score, result and competition
| No. | Date | Venue | Cap | Opponent | Score | Result | Competition |
|---|---|---|---|---|---|---|---|
| 1 | 12 November 2005 | Stade de Suisse, Bern, Switzerland | 2 | Turkey | 2–0 | 2–0 | 2006 FIFA World Cup qualification |
| 2 | 24 May 2008 | Stadio Cornaredo, Lugano, Switzerland | 14 | Slovenia | 2–0 | 2–0 | Friendly |

== Honours ==
=== Club ===
Napoli

- Coppa Italia: 2013–14

=== Records ===
- The only Swiss player to appear in four consecutive World Cups: (2006, 2010, 2014, 2018)
