= Goran Pandev =

Macedonian association football player (born 1983)

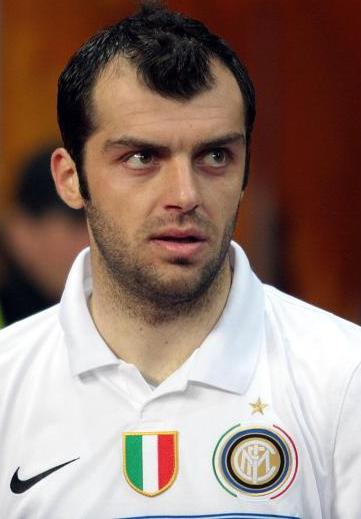
- Pandev with Inter Milan in 2010

Personal information
- Full name: Goran Pandev
- Date of birth: 27 July 1983 (age 43)
- Place of birth: Strumica, SR Macedonia, Yugoslavia
- Height: 1.84 m (6 ft 0 in)
- Position: Forward

Youth career
- Belasica

Senior career*
Years	Team	Apps	(Gls)
1999–2001	Belasica	18	(6)
2001–2004	Inter Milan	0	(0)
2002–2003	→ Spezia (loan)	22	(4)
2003–2004	→ Ancona (loan)	20	(1)
2004–2009	Lazio	159	(48)
2009–2012	Inter Milan	47	(5)
2011–2012	→ Napoli (loan)	30	(6)
2012–2014	Napoli	62	(13)
2014–2015	Galatasaray	4	(0)
2015–2022	Genoa	176	(28)
2022	Parma	11	(1)
Total		549	(112)

International career
1999	Macedonia U16	2	(0)
2000–2001	Macedonia U19	3	(2)
2001–2002	Macedonia U21	7	(2)
2001–2021	North Macedonia	122	(38)
- * Club domestic league appearances and goals

Goran Pandev (Macedonian: Горан Пандев, pronounced [ˈɡɔran ˈpandɛf]; born 27 July 1983) is a Macedonian former professional footballer who played as a forward. He is regarded as one of the best Macedonian footballers of all time.

After a stint at Lazio, Pandev moved to Inter Milan in early 2010. While playing for the Nerazzurri, Pandev collected a host of honours including winning the Serie A, the Coppa Italia and the UEFA Champions League in 2010 as part of a treble for the club. On 22 April 2021, he became the first Macedonian to score 100 goals in one of the top five European football leagues. He was the captain of the North Macedonia national team until retiring from international football in 2021. He is the country's all-time top scorer with 38 goals.

== Club career ==
=== Early career ===
Pandev was born in Strumica, SR Macedonia, which was part of Yugoslavia at the time, and began his football career with FK Belasica, the club with which he progressed through the youth academy. He only spent one season in the local Prva Liga, however, before being signed by Serie A giants Inter Milan in the summer of 2001 when he was just 18 years old.

Inter loaned Pandev to feeder club Spezia in July 2002, where he was a regular in Serie C1. The following year, he was again sent on loan, this time to newly promoted Serie A club Ancona. During his time at Ancona, the team had the worst season of any club in Serie A history.

=== Lazio ===
In January 2004, Serbian player Dejan Stanković was signed by Inter from Lazio and Pandev was sent to the capital in exchange on a co-ownership deal, for a nominal fee of €500, but he remained at Ancona until the end of the 2003–04 season. Pandev impressed in his first year at Lazio, as he made 29 appearances, scoring three goals, which included a memorable effort away to Juventus where he beat Fabio Cannavaro, Lilian Thuram and Gianluca Zambrotta before beating Gianluigi Buffon with an angled shot. In July 2005, 50 percent of his player registration rights were transferred to Udinese in exchange for David Pizarro's transfer to the Milanese club.

The following season, Delio Rossi was appointed manager of Lazio and Pandev began to form a deadly strike partnership with Tommaso Rocchi. In June 2006, Lazio bought the remaining 50 percent of his registration rights from Udinese for €4 million.

On 11 January 2009, Pandev scored his first hat-trick in Serie A against Reggina. On 24 March 2009, Pandev was awarded the Medal for Service to the Country by the then-President Branko Crvenkovski in acknowledgement of his sporting achievements and his contribution to developing and popularizing sport in Macedonia as well as promoting the country abroad.

==== Contract dispute with Lazio ====
In 2009, a dispute between Pandev and Lazio chairman Claudio Lotito erupted, resulting in a legal battle between Pandev and his club. The ruling was announced on 23 December 2009.

The dispute started with Pandev indicating his desire to leave Lazio during the summer of 2009. Chairman Lotito, apparently unhappy with Pandev's decision, froze him out of the squad. As a result, Pandev spent the remaining four months training on his own, without making a single appearance for his club. During this period, various clubs had indicated their interest in buying Pandev, most notably Zenit Saint Petersburg, which made an offer of €13 million for the player. Lazio chairman Lotito rejected the offer, demanding €15 million instead. The deal eventually fell through after both parties failed to agree on price.

On 26 September, Pandev officially filed for a termination of his contract with Lazio, having been frozen out of the squad and labelled a "rebel" by the club. Pandev argued that by freezing him out of the squad, Lazio had violated the terms of their contract with him. On 23 December 2009, the Lega Nazionale Professionisti ruled in Pandev's favor, ordering Lazio to release Pandev from his contract and pay him €170,000 for emotional distress. Lotito indicated his desire to appeal the decision.

=== Inter Milan ===
On 4 January 2010, Pandev signed a four-and-a-half-year contract with Inter Milan, wearing the number 27 shirt. He made his Inter debut as a starter in the 1–0 away win against Chievo on 6 January. His first two games for the Nerazzurri resulted in him contributing to both winners — setting up Mario Balotelli against Chievo and setting up Walter Samuel to score a last minute winner against Siena. He opened his scoring account in his third appearance for the club, pulling a goal back for Inter in an eventual 2–2 draw at Bari. Pandev was the main protagonist in the 2–0 victory against local rivals Milan as he first assisted Diego Milito with an overhead cross and scored a curling freekick to complete the win. He continued with his solid performances throughout the season, being an important player in Inter's winning of the first treble in the history of Italian football. Inter won their fifth consecutive Serie A title by defeating Siena in the final match, and also defeated Roma at Stadio Olimpico to win the Coppa Italia. On 22 May 2010, Inter won the UEFA Champions League in the final against Bayern Munich, with Pandev playing for 79 minutes and becoming the third Macedonian football player in history to ever win this championship.

He began the new season on 21 August by winning the 2010 Supercoppa Italiana under Rafael Benítez, scoring the equalizer versus Roma in an eventual 3–1 home win for the first silverware of the season. Six days later, he made an appearance as substitute as Inter lost the 2010 UEFA Super Cup to Atlético Madrid. Later in December 2010, Pandev was part of the team that competed at 2010 FIFA Club World Cup. He made his debut in the competition by playing full-90 minutes in the 3–0 victory against Seongnam Ilhwa Chunma in the semi-final. On 18 December, in the final against Congo's TP Mazembe, Pandev netted inside 13 minutes to make it his first goal in a major final as Inter won 3–0 to lift the trophy. On 15 March 2011, in the second leg of 2010–11 UEFA Champions League round of 16 tie against Bayern Munich, Pandev resulted decisive by scoring in the 88th minute following a Samuel Eto'o pass to make it 3–2 for Inter. Inter progressed to the quarter-finals on away goals rule, with Pandev describing his goal as the "most important" of his career. Later on 29 May 2011, in the 2011 Coppa Italia final match against Palermo, Pandev entered in the second half and provided the assist of Diego Milito goal in the 92nd minute for a 3–1 success. This turned out to be his last appearance for the club as he was removed during the summer transfer window.

=== Napoli ===
On 26 August 2011, Pandev joined Napoli on a season-long loan. On 10 September, Pandev came on as a substitute to make his Napoli debut against Cesena in the 66th minute with the score tied at 1–1. Despite Napoli making it 2–1 in their favour right after the Macedonian striker came on, Pandev missed an open goal in the 85th minute, hitting the crossbar from six yards out after a square pass across the face of goal was played to him; Napoli managed to win the match 3–1. On 29 November, Pandev came in for an injured Edinson Cavani and started a home match against rivals Juventus. He scored two goals, the first of which was his first for Napoli, and the second was a volley goal. The two goals put Napoli up 3–1 but Juventus came back to tie the game at 3–3, the final score. Pandev then went on to score his third Serie A goal for Napoli in their 6–1 pummeling of Genoa on 21 December. Following the winter break, Pandev netted his side's opening goal in a 1–3 victory in Sicily against Palermo on 8 January 2012. On 20 May 2012, Pandev won another Coppa Italia, setting up Marek Hamšík's goal in a 2–0 win over Juventus in Rome, meaning that he had been on the tournament's winning side for the past four consecutive years. On 6 June 2012, Pandev made a permanent switch from Inter to Napoli. Later, Napoli President Aurelio De Laurentiis noted on a radio interview that Pandev had taken a pay cut to join the Neapolitans, with the President noting this as a sign of commitment to the club and fans.

On 28 September 2013, Pandev scored both goals in Napoli's win over Genoa, sending the Neapolitans to the top of the league table. Pandev came on in place of Gonzalo Higuaín for the last 20 minutes of the 2014 Coppa Italia final, which Napoli won 3–1 against Fiorentina.

=== Galatasaray ===
On 1 September 2014, Pandev signed a two-year contract with Turkish club Galatasaray worth €2.4 million a year. Pandev struggled for game time at Galatasaray and he was mainly used as a cup player.

=== Genoa ===
Pandev signed a two-year contract with Italian club Genoa in 2015 after failing to get playing time at Galatasaray. He planned on retiring at the end of the 2019–20 season, but extended his contract following the postponement of UEFA Euro 2020 to 2021.

With a brace against Benevento on 21 April 2021, Pandev reached the 100-goal mark in his Serie A career. He became the first Macedonian to reach the century mark in one of the "Big 5" European leagues. He ended the 2020–21 season with his highest goals plus assists per 90 minutes since 2013–14.

On 13 August 2021, Pandev signed a contract with Genoa to stay in Serie A until 30 June 2022.

=== Parma and retirement ===
On 31 January 2022, Pandev moved to Serie B club Parma. On 22 September, at the age of 39, Pandev retired from professional football, ending his 22-year career with over 600 caps and 120 goals for club and country.

== International career ==
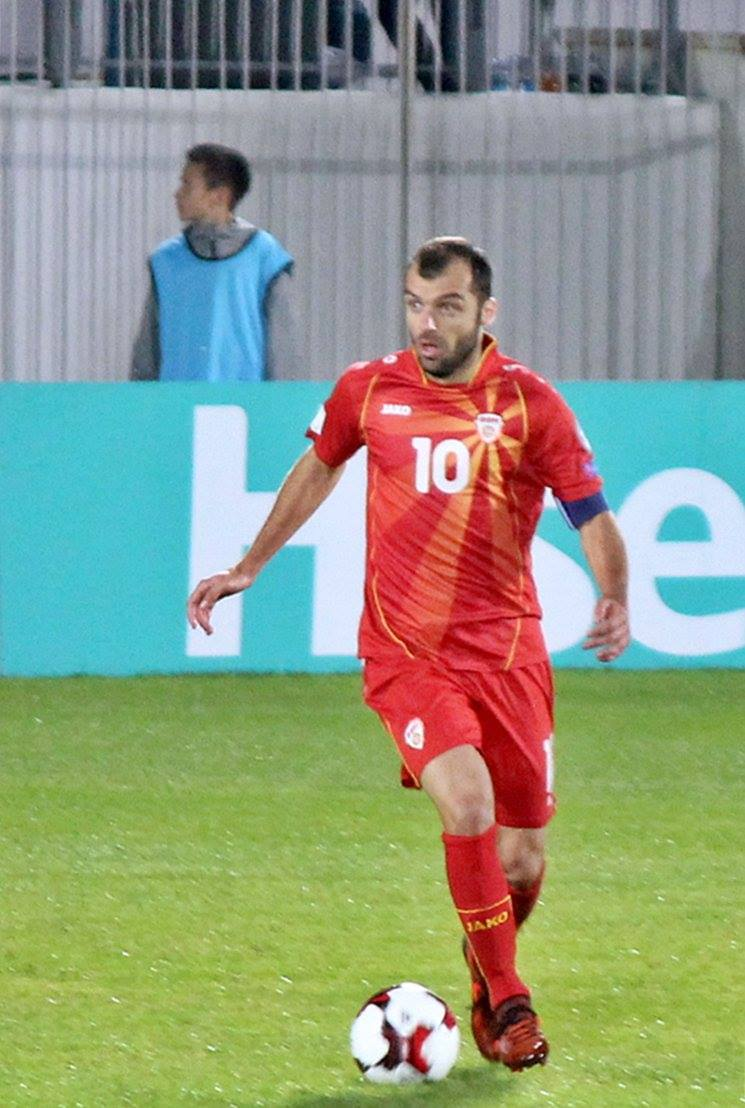
Pandev playing for Macedonia in 2017

In June 2001, Pandev made his senior debut for the Macedonian football team during an away FIFA World Cup qualification match against Turkey. With two goals against Spain on 12 August 2009, he became the national team's all-time leading scorer, surpassing Georgi Hristov.

Pandev intended to retire from international football in 2015, but was persuaded to keep playing by national manager Igor Angelovski. Pandev earned his 100th cap in a 3–1 home victory against Latvia in UEFA Euro 2020 qualification in March 2019. He scored the team's only goal in North Macedonia's 1–0 Euro 2020 play-off victory over Georgia in November 2020, which saw his nation qualify for a major international tournament for the very first time. In the tournament he scored North Macedonia's first ever goal at a major tournament, pouncing on a mistake to score in an open net in a 3–1 defeat to Austria at Euro 2020 in the nation's competition debut, making him the second-oldest scorer in the finals of a European Championship, only behind Ivica Vastić. On 21 June 2021, he played his last match for his national team against the Netherlands in the last group stage match of the Euro 2020.

== Style of play ==
Goran Pandev was a skilled Macedonian forward. Pandev was a quick, creative, and hard-working left-footed forward with good technique, who was capable both of creating and scoring goals, due to his opportunism and shooting accuracy, as well as his vision and passing ability. He was capable of playing in several offensive positions, either on the right or through the centre of the pitch, and was usually deployed in a supporting role, as a winger, as a second striker, or as an attacking midfielder, although he had also been fielded as a striker or as a false nine.

== Personal life ==
Pandev's younger brother Sashko is also a footballer. In 2019, Pandev obtained Italian citizenship in Naples. One year later, he auctioned the shirt he wore in the match in which he gained his 100th cap for North Macedonia for a hospital fighting the coronavirus pandemic. In 2010, Pandev founded a football academy in his country, named Akademija Pandev.

== Career statistics ==
=== Club ===
Appearances and goals by club, season and competition
Club	Season	League			National cup (Note: Includes Coppa Italia, Turkish Cup)		Europe		Other		Total	
Club	Season	Division	Apps	Goals	Apps	Goals	Apps	Goals	Apps	Goals	Apps	Goals
Belasica	2000–01	Macedonian First League	18	6	—		—		—		18	6
Inter Milan	2001–02	Serie A	—		—		—		—		0	0
Spezia (loan)	2002–03	Serie C1	22	4	—		—		—		22	4
Ancona (loan)	2003–04	Serie A	20	1	1	0	—		—		21	1
Lazio	2004–05	Serie A	25	3	1	0	4 (Note: Appearances in UEFA Cup)	1	0	0	30	4
Lazio	2005–06	Serie A	35	11	3	1	—		—		38	12
Lazio	2006–07	Serie A	36	11	3	3	—		—		39	14
Lazio	2007–08	Serie A	32	14	5	0	8 (Note: Appearances in UEFA Champions League)	5	—		45	19
Lazio	2008–09	Serie A	31	9	6	6	—		—		37	15
Lazio	Total		159	48	18	10	12	6	—		189	64
Inter Milan	2009–10	Serie A	19	3	2	0	6	0	—		27	3
Inter Milan	2010–11	Serie A	27	2	4	0	7	1	4 (Note: One appearance and one goal in Supercoppa Italiana, one appearance in UEFA Super Cup, two appearances and one goal in FIFA Club World Cup)	2	42	5
Inter Milan	2011–12	Serie A	1	0	0	0	0	0	0	0	1	0
Inter Milan	Total		47	5	6	0	13	1	4	2	70	8
Napoli (loan)	2011–12	Serie A	30	6	5	1	7	0	—		42	7
Napoli	2012–13	Serie A	33	6	1	0	6 (Note: Appearances in UEFA Europa League)	0	1 (Note: Appearance in Supercoppa Italiana)	1	41	7
Napoli	2013–14	Serie A	29	7	3	0	9 (Note: Five appearances in UEFA Champions League, four appearances and one goal in UEFA Europa League)	1	—		41	8
Napoli	Total		92	19	9	1	22	1	1	1	124	22
Galatasaray	2014–15	Süper Lig	4	0	10	7	3	0	0	0	17	7
Genoa	2015–16	Serie A	15	0	1	0	—		—		16	0
Genoa	2016–17	Serie A	20	3	3	4	—		—		23	7
Genoa	2017–18	Serie A	32	5	1	0	—		—		33	5
Genoa	2018–19	Serie A	26	4	2	0	—		—		28	4
Genoa	2019–20	Serie A	34	9	1	0	—		—		35	9
Genoa	2020–21	Serie A	29	7	1	0	—		—		30	7
Genoa	2021–22	Serie A	20	0	2	0	—		—		22	0
Genoa	Total		176	28	11	4	—		—		187	32
Parma	2021–22	Serie B	11	1	—		—		—		11	1
Career total			549	112	55	22	50	8	5	3	659	145

=== International ===
Appearances and goals by national team and year
National team	Year	Apps	Goals
North Macedonia (Note: North Macedonia was known as Macedonia until 2019)	2001	1	0
North Macedonia	2002	3	1
North Macedonia	2003	5	1
North Macedonia	2004	8	4
North Macedonia	2005	7	3
North Macedonia	2006	5	1
North Macedonia	2007	5	1
North Macedonia	2008	8	3
North Macedonia	2009	10	8
North Macedonia	2010	4	1
North Macedonia	2011	5	1
North Macedonia	2012	7	1
North Macedonia	2013	7	1
North Macedonia	2014	0	0
North Macedonia	2015	0	0
North Macedonia	2016	8	1
North Macedonia	2017	9	4
North Macedonia	2018	7	2
North Macedonia	2019	9	1
North Macedonia	2020	6	2
North Macedonia	2021	8	2
Total		122	38

Scores and results list North Macedonia's goal tally first, score column indicates score after each Pandev goal

List of international goals scored by Goran Pandev
No.	Date	Venue	Opponent	Score	Result	Competition
1	21 August 2002	Philip II Arena, Skopje, Macedonia	Malta	5–0	5–0	Friendly
2	20 August 2003	Stadion Goce Delčev, Prilep, Macedonia	Albania	2–1	3–1	Friendly
3	18 February 2004	Philip II Arena, Skopje, Macedonia	Bosnia and Herzegovina	1–0	1–0	Friendly
4	11 June 2004	A. Le Coq Arena, Tallinn, Estonia	Estonia	3–0	4–2	Friendly
5	18 August 2004	Philip II Arena, Skopje, Macedonia	Armenia	1–0	3–0	2006 FIFA World Cup qualification
6	9 October 2004	Philip II Arena, Skopje, Macedonia	Netherlands	1–1	2–2	2006 FIFA World Cup qualification
7	4 June 2005	Vazgen Sargsyan Republican Stadium, Yerevan, Armenia	Armenia	1–0	2–1	2006 FIFA World Cup qualification
8	4 June 2005	Vazgen Sargsyan Republican Stadium, Yerevan, Armenia	Armenia	2–0	2–1	2006 FIFA World Cup qualification
9	8 June 2005	Na Stínadlech, Teplice, Czech Republic	Czech Republic	1–0	1–6	2006 FIFA World Cup qualification
10	11 October 2006	Camp d’Esports d’Aixovall, Andorra La Vella, Andorra	Andorra	1–0	3–0	UEFA Euro 2008 qualifying
11	17 October 2007	Philip II Arena, Skopje, Macedonia	Andorra	3–0	3–0	UEFA Euro 2008 qualifying
12	20 August 2008	Stade Josy Barthel, Luxembourg City, Luxembourg	Luxembourg	1–0	4–1	Friendly
13	20 August 2008	Stade Josy Barthel, Luxembourg City, Luxembourg	Luxembourg	3–0	4–1	Friendly
14	10 September 2008	Philip II Arena, Skopje, Macedonia	Netherlands	1–2	1–2	2010 FIFA World Cup qualification
15	11 February 2009	Mardan Sports Complex, Antalya, Turkey	Moldova	1–0	1–1	Friendly
16	12 August 2009	Philip II Arena, Skopje, Macedonia	Spain	1–0	2–3	Friendly
17	12 August 2009	Philip II Arena, Skopje, Macedonia	Spain	2–0	2–3	Friendly
18	11 October 2009	Philip II Arena, Skopje, Macedonia	Qatar	1–1	2–1	Friendly
19	11 October 2009	Philip II Arena, Skopje, Macedonia	Qatar	2–1	2–1	Friendly
20	14 November 2009	Stadion Mladost, Strumica, Macedonia	Canada	2–0	3–0	Friendly
21	14 November 2009	Stadion Mladost, Strumica, Macedonia	Canada	3–0	3–0	Friendly
22	18 November 2009	Azadi Stadium, Tehran, Iran	Iran	1–1	1–1	Friendly
23	3 March 2010	Philip II Arena, Skopje, Macedonia	Montenegro	2–0	2–1	Friendly
24	10 August 2011	Dalga Arena, Baku, Azerbaijan	Azerbaijan	1–0	1–0	Friendly
25	15 August 2012	Philip II Arena, Skopje, Macedonia	Lithuania	1–0	1–0	Friendly
26	6 February 2013	Philip II Arena, Skopje, Macedonia	Denmark	1–0	3–0	Friendly
27	29 May 2016	Sportplatz Bad Erlach, Bad Erlach, Austria	Azerbaijan	2–0	3–1	Friendly
28	28 March 2017	Philip II Arena, Skopje, Macedonia	Belarus	2–0	3–0	Friendly
29	28 March 2017	Philip II Arena, Skopje, Macedonia	Belarus	3–0	3–0	Friendly
30	2 September 2017	Sammy Ofer Stadium, Haifa, Israel	Israel	1–0	1–0	2018 FIFA World Cup qualification
31	11 November 2017	Philip II Arena, Skopje, Macedonia	Norway	1–0	2–0	Friendly
32	9 September 2018	Philip II Arena, Skopje, Macedonia	Armenia	2–0	2–0	2018–19 UEFA Nations League D
33	13 October 2018	Philip II Arena, Skopje, Macedonia	Liechtenstein	3–0	4–1	2018–19 UEFA Nations League D
34	9 September 2019	Daugava Stadium, Riga, Latvia	Latvia	1–0	2–0	UEFA Euro 2020 qualifying
35	11 October 2020	A. Le Coq Arena, Tallinn, Estonia	Estonia	2–3	3–3	2020–21 UEFA Nations League C
36	12 November 2020	Boris Paichadze Dinamo Arena, Tbilisi, Georgia	Georgia	1–0	1–0	UEFA Euro 2020 qualifying play-offs
37	31 March 2021	MSV-Arena, Duisburg, Germany	Germany	1–0	2–1	2022 FIFA World Cup qualification
38	13 June 2021	Arena Națională, Bucharest, Romania	Austria	1–1	1–3	UEFA Euro 2020

== Honours ==
Lazio

- Coppa Italia: 2008–09

Inter Milan

- Serie A: 2009–10
- Coppa Italia: 2009–10, 2010–11
- Supercoppa Italiana: 2010
- UEFA Champions League: 2009–10
- FIFA Club World Cup: 2010

Napoli

- Coppa Italia: 2011–12, 2013–14

Galatasaray

- Süper Lig: 2014–15
- Turkish Cup: 2014–15

Individual

- Macedonian Footballer of the Year: 2004, 2006, 2007, 2008, 2010
- Coppa Italia top scorer: 2008–09, 2016–17

== See also ==
- List of men's footballers with 100 or more international caps
