= 2011–12 SSC Napoli season =

Napoli
2011–12 season
- President: Aurelio De Laurentiis
- Head coach: Walter Mazzarri
- Stadium: Stadio San Paolo
- Serie A: 5th
- Coppa Italia: Winners
- UEFA Champions League: Round of 16
- Top goalscorer: League: Edinson Cavani (23); All: Edinson Cavani (33)
- Highest home attendance: 60,074 vs Bayern Munich (18 October 2011, Champions League)
- Lowest home attendance: 25,297 vs Cesena (1 February 2012, Coppa Italia)
- Average home league attendance: 45,851
| Home colours | Away colours | Third colours |

Società Sportiva Calcio Napoli contested the Serie A, the UEFA Champions League (for the first time) and won the 2011–12 Coppa Italia during the 2011–12 season.

== Players ==
=== Squad information ===
Note: Flags indicate national team as defined under FIFA eligibility rules; some limited exceptions apply. Players may hold more than one non-FIFA nationality.

| No. | Pos. | Nation | Player |
|---|---|---|---|
| 1 | GK | ITA | Morgan De Sanctis |
| 2 | DF | ITA | Gianluca Grava |
| 3 | DF | ARG | Ignacio Fideleff |
| 4 | MF | ITA | Marco Donadel |
| 6 | DF | ITA | Salvatore Aronica |
| 7 | FW | URU | Edinson Cavani |
| 8 | DF | ITA | Andrea Dossena |
| 11 | MF | ITA | Christian Maggio |
| 14 | DF | ARG | Hugo Campagnaro |
| 15 | GK | ITA | Roberto Colombo |
| 16 | FW | CHI | Eduardo Vargas |
| 17 | MF | SVK | Marek Hamšík (vice-captain) |
| 18 | DF | COL | Juan Zúñiga |

| No. | Pos. | Nation | Player |
|---|---|---|---|
| 20 | MF | SUI | Blerim Džemaili |
| 21 | DF | ARG | Federico Fernández |
| 22 | FW | ARG | Ezequiel Lavezzi |
| 23 | MF | URU | Walter Gargano |
| 28 | DF | ITA | Paolo Cannavaro (captain) |
| 29 | FW | MKD | Goran Pandev (on loan from Internazionale) |
| 31 | MF | ITA | Jacopo Dezi |
| 83 | GK | ITA | Antonio Rosati |
| 85 | DF | URU | Miguel Britos |
| 88 | MF | SUI | Gökhan Inler |
| 90 | MF | ITA | Massimiliano Ammendola |
| 99 | FW | ITA | Cristiano Lucarelli |

== Competitions ==
=== Serie A ===
==== League table ====
| Pos | Team | Pld | W | D | L | GF | GA | GD | Pts | Qualification or relegation |
|---|---|---|---|---|---|---|---|---|---|---|
| 3 | Udinese | 38 | 18 | 10 | 10 | 52 | 35 | +17 | 64 | Qualification to Champions League play-off round |
| 4 | Lazio | 38 | 18 | 8 | 12 | 56 | 47 | +9 | 62 | Qualification to Europa League play-off round |
| 5 | Napoli | 38 | 16 | 13 | 9 | 66 | 46 | +20 | 61 | Qualification to Europa League group stage (Note: Napoli qualified to the group stage of the Europa League as winner of the 2011–12 Coppa Italia. As they finished fifth, the sixth-placed team of the league also qualified for the Europa League.) |
| 6 | Internazionale | 38 | 17 | 7 | 14 | 58 | 55 | +3 | 58 | Qualification to Europa League third qualifying round |
| 7 | Roma | 38 | 16 | 8 | 14 | 60 | 54 | +6 | 56 (Note: Roma finished ahead of Parma on head–to–head away goals scored: Parma 0–1 Roma, Roma 1–0 Parma.) | |

Source: Lega Serie A
Rules for classification: 1) points; 2) head-to-head points; 3) head-to-head goal difference; 4) head-to-head goals scored; 5) goal difference; 6) number of goals scored

==== Results summary ====
| Overall | | | | | | | | Home | | | | | | Away | | | | | |
| Pld | W | D | L | GF | GA | GD | Pts | W | D | L | GF | GA | GD | W | D | L | GF | GA | GD |
|---|---|---|---|---|---|---|---|---|---|---|---|---|---|---|---|---|---|---|---|
| 38 | 16 | 13 | 9 | 66 | 46 | +20 | 61 | 10 | 6 | 3 | 39 | 22 | +17 | 6 | 7 | 6 | 27 | 24 | +3 |

Last updated: 13 May 2012.
Source: Competitive matches

==== Results by round ====
| Round | 1 | 2 | 3 | 4 | 5 | 6 | 7 | 8 | 9 | 10 | 11 | 12 | 13 | 14 | 15 | 16 | 17 | 18 | 19 | 20 | 21 | 22 | 23 | 24 | 25 | 26 | 27 | 28 | 29 | 30 | 31 | 32 | 33 | 34 | 35 | 36 | 37 | 38 |
|---|---|---|---|---|---|---|---|---|---|---|---|---|---|---|---|---|---|---|---|---|---|---|---|---|---|---|---|---|---|---|---|---|---|---|---|---|---|---|
| Ground | H | A | H | A | H | A | H | A | H | A | H | H | A | H | A | H | A | H | A | A | H | A | H | A | H | A | H | A | H | A | A | H | A | H | A | H | A | H |
| Result | W | W | W | L | D | W | L | D | W | L | D | D | D | W | D | L | W | D | D | L | D | D | W | W | W | W | W | D | D | L | L | L | W | W | D | W | L | W |
| Position | 1 | 1 | 1 | 4 | 4 | 3 | 5 | 5 | 4 | 5 | 6 | 7 | 8 | 5 | 5 | 6 | 6 | 6 | 7 | 7 | 7 | 7 | 7 | 6 | 5 | 5 | 4 | 4 | 4 | 4 | 5 | 6 | 4 | 5 | 3 | 3 | 5 | 5 |

Updated to match(es) played on 13 May 2012. Source: Competitive matches
A = Away; H = Home; W = Win; D = Draw; L = Loss

==== Matches ====
| 10 September 2011 2 | Cesena | 1–3 | Napoli | Cesena |
| 20:45 CEST (UTC+02:00) | Guana 24'; Candreva (yellow card) 44'; Benalouane (yellow card) 52' (yellow-red card) 55'; Lauro (yellow card) 62' | Report | Lavezzi 3', (yellow card) 57'; Santana (yellow card) 34'; Cannavaro (yellow card) 59'; Campagnaro 67'; Hamšík 87' | Stadium: Stadio Dino Manuzzi; Attendance: 20,942; Referee: Mauro Bergonzi |

| 18 September 2011 3 | Napoli | 3–1 | Milan | Naples |
| 20:45 CEST (UTC+02:00) | Cavani 14', 36', 52', (yellow card) 73'; Aronica (yellow card) 62'; Gargano (yellow card) 73' | Report | Aquilani 11'; Nocerino (yellow card) 24'; Pato (yellow card) 54'; Nesta (yellow card) 62'; Antonini (yellow card) 76' | Stadium: Stadio San Paolo; Attendance: 51,025; Referee: Paolo Tagliavento |

| 21 September 2011 4 | Chievo | 1–0 | Napoli | Verona |
| 20:45 CEST (UTC+02:00) | Moscardelli 71'; Sorrentino (yellow card) 79'; Rigoni (yellow card) 80' | Report | Fideleff (yellow card) 67' | Stadium: Stadio Marc'Antonio Bentegodi; Attendance: 9,000; Referee: Antonio Damato |

| 24 September 2011 5 | Napoli | 0–0 | Fiorentina | Naples |
| 20:45 CEST (UTC+02:00) | Inler (yellow card) 41'; Hamšík (yellow card) 63' | Report | Vargas (yellow card) 49'; Behrami (yellow card) 82'; Montolivo (yellow card) 86' | Stadium: Stadio San Paolo; Attendance: 40,653; Referee: Paolo Valeri |

| 1 October 2011 6 | Internazionale | 0–3 | Napoli | Milan |
| 20:45 CEST (UTC+02:00) | Chivu (yellow card) 37'; Obi (yellow card) 10' (yellow-red card) 41'; Zanetti (yellow card) 45'; Júlio César (yellow card) 45+1' | Report | Zúñiga (yellow card) 28'; Campagnaro 43'; Maggio 56'; Mascara (yellow card) 73'; Hamšík 75' | Stadium: San Siro; Attendance: 64,824; Referee: Gianluca Rocchi |

| 15 October 2011 7 | Napoli | 1–2 | Parma | Naples |
| 20:45 CEST (UTC+02:00) | Lavezzi (yellow card) 73'; Mascara 76' | Report | Gobbi 57'; Biabiany (yellow card) 62'; Modesto 82' | Stadium: Stadio San Paolo; Attendance: 41,042; Referee: Paolo Mazzoleni |

| 23 October 2011 8 | Cagliari | 0–0 | Napoli | Cagliari |
| 15:00 CEST (UTC+02:00) | Nenê (yellow card) 74'; Conti (yellow card) 84'; Cossu (yellow card) 85' | Report | Lavezzi (yellow card) 45+1'; Maggio (yellow card) 90+2' | Stadium: Stadio Sant'Elia; Referee: Luca Banti |

| 26 October 2011 9 | Napoli | 2–0 | Udinese | Naples |
| 20:45 CEST (UTC+02:00) | Lavezzi 20'; Maggio 44' | Report | Asamoah (yellow card) 43'; Torje (yellow card) 45'; Pinzi (yellow card) 90'; Floro Flores (yellow card) 90+1' | Stadium: Stadio San Paolo; Attendance: 35,565; Referee: Andrea De Marco |

| 29 October 2011 10 | Catania | 2–1 | Napoli | Catania |
| 18:00 CEST (UTC+02:00) | Marchese 25'; Bergessio 48'; Bellusci (yellow card) 65' | Report | Cavani 1'; Santana (yellow card) 19' (yellow-red card) 42'; Cannavaro (yellow card) 61' | Stadium: Stadio Angelo Massimino; Attendance: 13,589; Referee: Domenico Celi |

| 29 November 2011 11 | Napoli | 3–3 | Juventus | Naples |
| 20:45 CET | Pandev (yellow card) 16', (goal) 40', 68'; Maggio (yellow card) 19'; Hamšík 22', (yellow card) 43' | Report | Bonucci (yellow card) 37'; Matri (yellow card) 40', (goal) 48'; Lichtsteiner (yellow card) 43'; Vidal (yellow card) 58'; Estigarribia 72'; Pepe 79' | Stadium: Stadio San Paolo; Attendance: 57,402; Referee: Paolo Tagliavento |
Note: The match was initially scheduled on November 6 but was postponed to November 29 because of bad weather conditions in Campania.

| 19 November 2011 12 | Napoli | 0–0 | Lazio | Naples |
| 20:45 CET | | Report | Cissé (yellow card) 6'; Radu (yellow card) 81'; Stankevičius (yellow card) 90+2' | Stadium: Stadio San Paolo; Attendance: 35,000; Referee: Nicola Rizzoli |

| 26 November 2011 13 | Atalanta | 1–1 | Napoli | Bergamo |
| 20:45 CET (UTC+01:00) | Lavezzi (yellow card) 37'; Denis 64'; Cigarini (yellow card) 79'; Consigli (yellow card) 89' | Report | Džemaili (yellow card) 4'; Zúñiga (yellow card) 41'; Fernández (yellow card) 54'; Lavezzi (yellow card) 90+2'; Cavani 90+4' | Stadium: Stadio Atleti Azzurri d'Italia; Attendance: 17,827; Referee: Daniele Orsato |

| 3 December 2011 14 | Napoli | 4–2 | Lecce | Naples |
| 20:45 CET (UTC+01:00) | Fideleff (yellow card) 13'; Lavezzi 26'; Cavani 33', 81'; Džemaili 41' | Report | Strasser (yellow card) 50'; Muriel 54'; Ferrario (yellow card) 81'; Corvia 90+3' | Stadium: Stadio San Paolo; Attendance: 39,544; Referee: Andrea Romeo |

| 11 December 2011 15 | Novara | 1–1 | Napoli | Novara |
| 20:45 CET (UTC+01:00) | Rigoni (yellow card) 32'; Dellafiore (yellow card) 47'; Radovanović 70'; Centurioni (yellow card) 85' | Report | Džemaili 84' | Stadium: Stadio Silvio Piola; Attendance: 16,328; Referee: Andrea De Marco |

| 18 December 2011 16 | Napoli | 1–3 | Roma | Naples |
| 20:45 CET (UTC+01:00) | Hamšík 82' | Report | De Sanctis 3' (o.g.); Rosi (yellow card) 49'; Totti (yellow card) 55'; Osvaldo 59'; Simplício 90' | Stadium: Stadio San Paolo; Attendance: 38,048; Referee: Domenico Celi |

| 21 December 2011 1 | Napoli | 6–1 | Genoa | Naples |
| 20:45 CET (UTC+01:00) | Cavani 12', 24'; Hamšík 17'; Aronica (yellow card) 21'; Pandev 45+1'; Gargano 49'; Zúñiga 80' | Report | Granqvist (yellow card) 9'; Jorquera 27' | Stadium: Stadio San Paolo; Attendance: 43,141; Referee: Paolo Valeri |

| 8 January 2012 17 | Palermo | 1–3 | Napoli | Palermo |
| 20:45 CET (UTC+01:00) | Miccoli 89' | Report | Pandev 35'; Cavani 54'; Hamšík 60' | Stadium: Stadio Renzo Barbera; Attendance: 22,110; Referee: Paolo Mazzoleni |

| 16 January 2012 18 | Napoli | 1–1 | Bologna | Naples |
| 20:45 CET (UTC+01:00) | Cavani 71' (pen.); Dossena (yellow card) 89' | Report | Acquafresca 14'; Mudingayi (yellow card) 36'; Morleo (yellow card) 66'; Cherubin (yellow card) 77'; Di Vaio (yellow card) 80' | Stadium: Stadio San Paolo; Attendance: 42,956; Referee: Christian Brighi |

| 22 January 2012 19 | Siena | 1–1 | Napoli | Siena |
| 15:00 CET (UTC+01:00) | Vitiello (yellow card) 28'; Pesoli (yellow card) 59'; Calaiò 67'; Bolzoni (yellow card) 72'; D'Agostino (yellow card) 80' | Report | Campagnaro (yellow card) 3'; Aronica (yellow card) 75'; Pandev 86' | Stadium: Stadio Artemio Franchi – Montepaschi Arena; Attendance: 14,643; Referee: Antonio Damato |

| 29 January 2012 20 | Genoa | 3–2 | Napoli | Genoa |
| 15:00 CET (UTC+01:00) | Kucka (yellow card) 3'; Palacio 31', 70', (yellow card) 90'; Gilardino 36'; Mesto (yellow card) 44'; Janković (yellow card) 59' | Report | Cannavaro (yellow card) 4'; Lavezzi (yellow card) 41', (goal) 82'; Džemaili (yellow card) 50'; Cavani 80' | Stadium: Stadio Luigi Ferraris; Attendance: 22,418; Referee: Gianluca Rocchi |

| 1 February 2012 21 | Napoli | 0–0 | Cesena | Naples |
| 20:45 CET (UTC+01:00) | Inler (yellow card) 35'; Gargano (yellow card) 50'; Britos (yellow card) 54'; Džemaili (yellow card) 87' | Report | Martinho (yellow card) 49'; Von Bergen (yellow card) 55'; Pudil (yellow card) 62'; Rodríguez (yellow card) 89' | Stadium: Stadio San Paolo; Attendance: 25,297; Referee: Luca Banti |

| 5 February 2012 22 | Milan | 0–0 | Napoli | Milan |
| 15:00 CET (UTC+01:00) | Van Bommel (yellow card) 13'; Seedorf (yellow card) 39'; Ibrahimović (red card) 64'; Emanuelson (yellow card) 75'; Mexès (yellow card) 78' | Report | Cavani (yellow card) 60'; De Sanctis (yellow card) 63'; Cannavaro (yellow card) 88' | Stadium: San Siro; Attendance: 44,011; Referee: Nicola Rizzoli |

| 13 February 2012 23 | Napoli | 2–0 | Chievo | Naples |
| 20:45 CET (UTC+01:00) | Britos 15', (yellow card) 90+3'; Cavani 38' (pen.); Grava (yellow card) 62'; Zúñiga (yellow card) 74' | Report | Sardo (yellow card) 56'; Hetemaj (yellow card) 70'; Andreolli (yellow card) 77' | Stadium: Stadio San Paolo; Attendance: 22,397; Referee: Gabriele Gava |

| 17 February 2012 24 | Fiorentina | 0–3 | Napoli | Florence |
| 20:45 CET (UTC+01:00) | Olivera (yellow card) 45+3'; Amauri (yellow card) 45+5' | Report | Cavani 3', 55'; Hamšík (yellow card) 35'; Rosati (yellow card) 73'; Lavezzi 90+1' | Stadium: Stadio Artemio Franchi; Attendance: 20,042; Referee: Daniele Orsato |

| 26 February 2012 25 | Napoli | 1–0 | Internazionale | Naples |
| 20:45 CET (UTC+01:00) | Gargano (yellow card) 19'; Lavezzi 59'; Aronica (red card) 79' | Report | Nagatomo (yellow card) 13'; Milito (yellow card) 45'; Córdoba (yellow card) 67'; Faraoni (yellow card) 70'; Poli (yellow card) 77' | Stadium: Stadio San Paolo; Attendance: 41,034; Referee: Mauro Bergonzi |

| 4 March 2012 26 | Parma | 1–2 | Napoli | Parma |
| 12:30 CET (UTC+01:00) | Zaccardo (yellow card) 12', (goal) 77'; Mariga (yellow card) 21'; Musacci (yellow card) 39'; Santacroce (yellow card) 66' | Report | Grava (yellow card) 2'; Cavani 40'; Džemaili (yellow card) 46'; Lavezzi (yellow card) 57', (goal) 86'; Cannavaro (yellow card) 64' | Stadium: Stadio Ennio Tardini; Attendance: 16,416; Referee: Paolo Valeri |

| 9 March 2012 27 | Napoli | 6–3 | Cagliari | Naples |
| 20:45 CET (UTC+01:00) | Hamšík 10'; Cannavaro 19'; Astori 30' (o.g.); Lavezzi 56' (pen.); Gargano 70'; Maggio 84' | Report | Larrivey 37', 77', 90+2'; Pisano (yellow card) 42'; Dessena (yellow card) 45'; Canini (yellow card) 51' | Stadium: Stadio San Paolo; Attendance: 40,022; Referee: Christian Brighi |

| 18 March 2012 28 | Udinese | 2–2 | Napoli | Udine |
| 20:45 CET (UTC+01:00) | Coda (yellow card) 26'; Pinzi 28'; Fabbrini (yellow card) 31' (yellow-red card) 60'; Di Natale 52'; Domizzi (yellow card) 74'; Floro Flores (yellow card) 90+1' | Report | Cavani 81', 85', (yellow card) 86'; Cannavaro (yellow card) 82' | Stadium: Stadio Friuli; Attendance: 21,661; Referee: Gianluca Rocchi |

| 25 March 2012 29 | Napoli | 2–2 | Catania | Naples |
| 15:00 CET (UTC+01:00) | Džemaili 61', (yellow card) 73'; Cavani 67' | Report | Barrientos (yellow card) 59'; Spolli 75'; Lanzafame 85'; Ricchiuti (yellow card) 87'; Legrottaglie (yellow card) 89' | Stadium: Stadio San Paolo; Attendance: 51,055; Referee: Andrea Gervasoni |

| 1 April 2012 30 | Juventus | 3–0 | Napoli | Turin |
| 20:45 CEST (UTC+02:00) | Lichtsteiner (yellow card) 38'; Vidal (yellow card) 39', (goal) 75'; De Ceglie (yellow card) 45+1'; Vučinić 53'; Marchisio (yellow card) 73'; Quagliarella 83' | Report | Gargano (yellow card) 63'; Cannavaro (yellow card) 68'; Zúñiga (red card) 86' | Stadium: Juventus Stadium; Attendance: 38,644; Referee: Daniele Orsato |

| 7 April 2012 31 | Lazio | 3–1 | Napoli | Rome |
| 21:00 CEST (UTC+02:00) | Candreva 9'; Mauri 68'; Ledesma 81' (pen.); Biava (yellow card) 88'; Brocchi (yellow card) 90+3' | Report | Pandev 34'; Cannavaro (yellow card) 62'; Džemaili (yellow card) 78'; Britos (yellow card) 80' | Stadium: Stadio Olimpico; Attendance: 38,410; Referee: Paolo Mazzoleni |

| 11 April 2012 32 | Napoli | 1–3 | Atalanta | Naples |
| 20:45 CEST (UTC+02:00) | Lavezzi 13'; Grava (yellow card) 31'; Fernández (yellow card) 54'; Pandev (red card) 69'; Džemaili (yellow card) 88' | Report | Bonaventura 10'; Denis (yellow card) 17'; Cazzola (yellow card) 42'; Peluso (yellow card) 50'; Bellini 58'; Carmona 68'; Lucchini (yellow card) 72'; Stendardo (yellow card) 74'; Mutarelli (yellow card) 81' | Stadium: Stadio San Paolo; Attendance: 35,519; Referee: Antonio Danilo Giannoccaro |

| 21 April 2012 34 | Napoli | 2–0 | Novara | Naples |
| 20:45 CEST (UTC+02:00) | Cavani 21'; Cannavaro 37'; Campagnaro (yellow card) 67' | Report | Morganella (yellow card) 45' | Stadium: Stadio San Paolo; Attendance: 31,675; Referee: Daniele Doveri |

| 25 April 2012 33 | Lecce | 0–2 | Napoli | Lecce |
| 15:00 CEST (UTC+02:00) | Cuadrado (yellow card) 41'; Delvecchio (yellow card) 53'; Blasi (yellow card) 77' | Report | Hamšík 5'; Cavani 51'; Cannavaro (yellow card) 53'; Fernández (yellow card) 65'; Džemaili (yellow card) 88' | Stadium: Stadio Via del Mare; Attendance: 18,113; Referee: Paolo Tagliavento |

| 28 April 2012 35 | Roma | 2–2 | Napoli | Rome |
| 20:45 CEST (UTC+02:00) | Taddei (yellow card) 34'; Marquinho 41', (yellow card) 80'; Heinze (yellow card) 76'; Gago (yellow card) 79'; Simplício 87'; Borini (yellow card) 90+3' | Report | Zúñiga 48'; Džemaili (yellow card) 50'; Cavani 67' | Stadium: Stadio Olimpico; Attendance: 29,643; Referee: Nicola Rizzoli |

| 1 May 2012 36 | Napoli | 2–0 | Palermo | Naples |
| 20:45 CEST (UTC+02:00) | Cavani 16' (pen.); Maggio (yellow card) 32'; Hamšík 35'; Fernández (yellow card) 59' | Report | Labrín (yellow card) 60' | Stadium: Stadio San Paolo; Attendance: 41,397; Referee: Andrea De Marco |

| 6 May 2012 37 | Bologna | 2–0 | Napoli | Bologna |
| 15:00 CEST (UTC+02:00) | Diamanti 17'; Loria (yellow card) 41'; Cherubin (yellow card) 57'; Rubin 64', (yellow card) 65'; Morleo (red card) 90' | Report | Gargano (yellow card) 43'; Britos (yellow card) 60'; Cannavaro (yellow card) 73'; Cavani (yellow card) 82'; Džemaili (yellow card) 83' (red card) 90'; Aronica (yellow card) 86'; Zúñiga (yellow card) 89' | Stadium: Stadio Renato Dall'Ara; Attendance: 26,647; Referee: Mauro Bergonzi |

| 13 May 2012 38 | Napoli | 2–1 | Siena | Naples |
| 20:45 CEST (UTC+02:00) | Dossena 6', 34', (yellow card) 35'; Campagnaro (yellow card) 30'; Hamšík (yellow card) 40'; Lavezzi (yellow card) 90' | Report | Destro 6', (yellow card) 15'; Parravicini (yellow card) 56'; D'Agostino (yellow card) 59'; Terzi (yellow card) 86' | Stadium: Stadio San Paolo; Attendance: 43,582; Referee: Domenico Celi |

=== Coppa Italia ===
| 12 January 2012 Round of 16 | Napoli | 2–1 | Cesena | Naples |
| 21:00 CET (UTC+01:00) | Cavani 65'; Pandev 86' | Report | Popescu 20' | Stadium: Stadio San Paolo; Referee: Daniele Doveri |

| 25 January 2012 Quarter-finals | Napoli | 2–0 | Internazionale | Naples |
| 20:45 CET (UTC+01:00) | Cavani 50' (pen.), 90+3' | Report | | Stadium: Stadio San Paolo; Referee: Domenico Celi |

| 9 February 2012 Semi-finals; First leg | Siena | 2–1 | Napoli | Siena |
| 20:45 CET (UTC+01:00) | Reginaldo 42'; D'Agostino 66' | Report | Pesoli 86' (o.g.) | Stadium: Stadio Artemio Franchi – Montepaschi Arena; Referee: Andrea De Marco |

| 21 March 2012 Semi-finals; Second leg | Napoli | 2–0 (3–2 agg.) | Siena | Naples |
| 20:45 CET (UTC+01:00) | Vergassola 11' (o.g.); Cavani 32'; Gargano (yellow card) 38' | Report | Mannini (yellow card) 55'; Pesoli (yellow card) 80' | Stadium: Stadio San Paolo; Referee: Paolo Valeri |

| 20 May 2012 Final | Juventus | 0–2 | Napoli | Rome |
| 21:00 CEST (UTC+02:00) | | Report | Cavani 63' (pen.); Hamšík 83' | Stadium: Stadio Olimpico; Attendance: 70,000; Referee: Christian Brighi |

=== UEFA Champions League ===
==== Group stage ====
| Pos | Team | Pld | W | D | L | GF | GA | GD | Pts | Qualification |
|---|---|---|---|---|---|---|---|---|---|---|
| 1 | (Germany) Bayern Munich | 6 | 4 | 1 | 1 | 11 | 6 | +5 | 13 | Advance to knockout phase |
| 2 | (Italy) Napoli | 6 | 3 | 2 | 1 | 10 | 6 | +4 | 11 | Advance to knockout phase |
| 3 | (England) Manchester City | 6 | 3 | 1 | 2 | 9 | 6 | +3 | 10 | Transfer to Europa League |
| 4 | (Spain) Villarreal | 6 | 0 | 0 | 6 | 2 | 14 | −12 | 0 | |

Source: Soccerway

| 14 September 2011 1 | Manchester City (England) | 1–1 | (Italy) Napoli | Manchester, England |
| 20:45 CEST (UTC+02:00) | Zabaleta (yellow card) 24'; Kolarov 74' | Report | Maggio (yellow card) 15'; Cannavaro (yellow card) 31'; Aronica (yellow card) 43'; Inler (yellow card) 59'; Cavani 69' | Stadium: City of Manchester Stadium; Attendance: 44,026; Referee: Jonas Eriksson (Sweden) |

| 27 September 2011 2 | Napoli (Italy) | 2–0 | (Spain) Villarreal | Naples, Italy |
| 20:45 CEST (UTC+02:00) | Aronica (yellow card) 5'; Hamšík 15'; Cavani 17' (pen.); Cannavaro (yellow card) 57' | Report | Rodríguez (yellow card) 16'; Cani (yellow card) 85'; Rossi (yellow card) 85' | Stadium: Stadio San Paolo; Attendance: 46,747; Referee: Frank De Bleeckere (Belgium) |

| 18 October 2011 3 | Napoli (Italy) | 1–1 | (Germany) Bayern Munich | Naples, Italy |
| 20:45 CEST (UTC+02:00) | Cannavaro (yellow card) 28'; Badstuber 39' (o.g.); Maggio (yellow card) 42'; Zúñiga (yellow card) 44'; Lavezzi (yellow card) 65' | Report | Kroos 2', (yellow card) 84'; Badstuber (yellow card) 7'; Schweinsteiger (yellow card) 28'; Ribéry (yellow card) 59'; Müller (yellow card) 79' | Stadium: Stadio San Paolo; Attendance: 60,074; Referee: Olegário Benquerença (Portugal) |

| 2 November 2011 4 | Bayern Munich (Germany) | 3–2 | (Italy) Napoli | Munich, Germany |
| 20:45 CET (UTC+01:00) | Gómez 17', 23', 42'; Boateng (yellow card) 73'; Badstuber (yellow card) 14' (yellow-red card) 77' | Report | Džemaili (yellow card) 36'; Fernández 45', 79', (yellow card) 64'; Cavani (yellow card) 69'; Zúñiga (yellow card) 69' (yellow-red card) 70' | Stadium: Allianz Arena; Attendance: 43,326; Referee: Pavel Královec (Czech Republic) |

| 22 November 2011 5 | Napoli (Italy) | 2–1 | (England) Manchester City | Naples, Italy |
| 20:45 CET (UTC+01:00) | Cavani 17', 49' | Report | Balotelli 33', (yellow card) 54'; Silva (yellow card) 61'; Kompany (yellow card) 77'; Kolarov (yellow card) 86' | Stadium: Stadio San Paolo; Attendance: 53,000; Referee: Damir Skomina (Slovenia) |

| 7 December 2011 6 | Villarreal (Spain) | 0–2 | (Italy) Napoli | Villarreal, Spain |
| 20:45 CET (UTC+01:00) | De Guzmán (yellow card) 4'; Zapata (yellow card) 22'; Pérez (yellow card) 38'; Ángel (yellow card) 90' | Report | Inler 65'; Hamšík 76'; Campagnaro (yellow card) 90' | Stadium: El Madrigal; Attendance: 15,350; Referee: Svein Oddvar Moen (Norway) |

==== Knockout phase ====
===== Round of 16 =====
| 21 February 2012 First leg | Napoli (Italy) | 3–1 | (England) Chelsea | Naples, Italy |
| 20:45 CET (UTC+01:00) | Lavezzi 38', 65'; Cavani (yellow card) 39', (goal) 45+2' | Report | Mata 27'; Meireles (yellow card) 41'; Cahill (yellow card) 56' | Stadium: Stadio San Paolo; Attendance: 52,495; Referee: Carlos Velasco Carballo (Spain) |

| 14 March 2012 Second leg | Chelsea (England) | 4–1 (a.e.t.) (5–4 agg.) | (Italy) Napoli | London, England |
| 20:45 CET (UTC+01:00) | Drogba 28'; Terry 47'; Lampard (yellow card) 43', (goal) 74' (pen.); A. Cole (yellow card) 98'; Ivanović 105+1' | Report | Cannavaro (yellow card) 53'; Inler 55', (yellow card) 112'; Dossena (yellow card) 68'; Campagnaro (yellow card) 115' | Stadium: Stamford Bridge; Attendance: 37,784; Referee: Felix Brych (Germany) |

== Statistics ==
=== Goalscorers ===
| Rank | No. | Pos | Nat | Name | Serie A | Coppa Italia | UEFA CL | Total |
|---|---|---|---|---|---|---|---|---|
| 1 | 7 | FW | (Uruguay) | Edinson Cavani | 23 | 5 | 5 | 33 |
| 2 | 17 | MF | (Slovakia) | Marek Hamšík | 9 | 1 | 2 | 12 |
| 3 | 22 | FW | (Argentina) | Ezequiel Lavezzi | 9 | 0 | 2 | 11 |
| 4 | 29 | FW | (North Macedonia) | Goran Pandev | 6 | 1 | 0 | 7 |
| 5 | 11 | DF | (Italy) | Christian Maggio | 3 | 0 | 0 | 3 |
| 5 | 20 | MF | (Switzerland) | Blerim Džemaili | 3 | 0 | 0 | 3 |
| 7 | 8 | DF | (Italy) | Andrea Dossena | 2 | 0 | 0 | 2 |
| 7 | 14 | DF | (Argentina) | Hugo Campagnaro | 2 | 0 | 0 | 2 |
| 7 | 18 | DF | (Colombia) | Juan Zúñiga | 2 | 0 | 0 | 2 |
| 7 | 21 | DF | (Argentina) | Federico Fernández | 0 | 0 | 2 | 2 |
| 7 | 23 | MF | (Uruguay) | Walter Gargano | 2 | 0 | 0 | 2 |
| 7 | 28 | DF | (Italy) | Paolo Cannavaro | 2 | 0 | 0 | 2 |
| 7 | 88 | MF | (Switzerland) | Gökhan Inler | 0 | 0 | 2 | 2 |
| 13 | 9 | FW | (Italy) | Giuseppe Mascara | 1 | 0 | 0 | 1 |
| 13 | 85 | DF | (Uruguay) | Miguel Britos | 1 | 0 | 0 | 1 |
| Own goal | | | | | 1 | 2 | 1 | 4 |
| Total | | | | | 66 | 9 | 14 | 89 |
