= 2012 Coppa Italia final =

64th Coppa Italia final
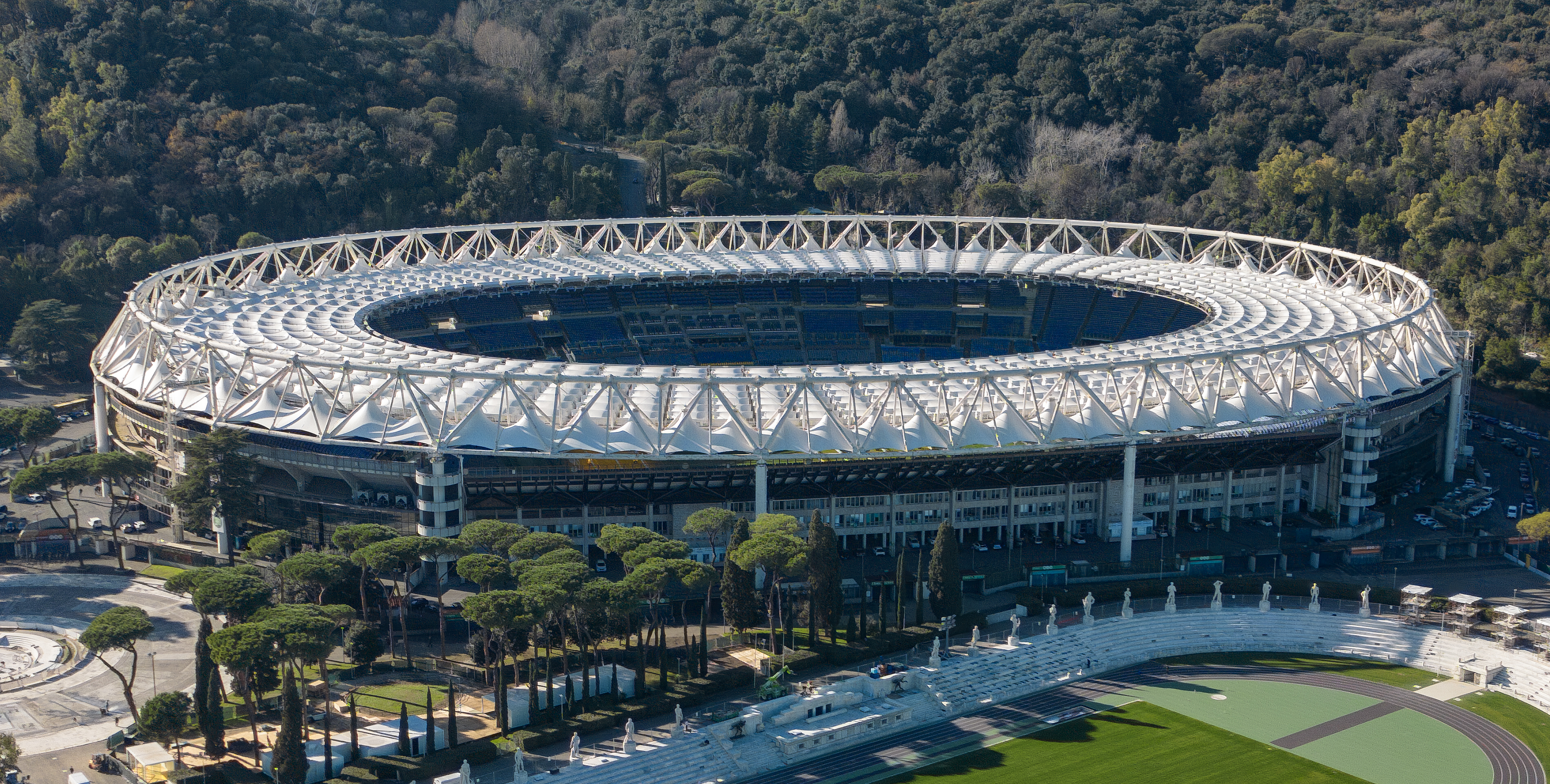
- Event: 2011–12 Coppa Italia
Juventus	Napoli
0	2
- Date: 20 May 2012
- Venue: Stadio Olimpico, Rome
- Referee: Christian Brighi
- Attendance: 61,803

The 2012 Coppa Italia final was the final match of the 2011–12 Coppa Italia, the top cup competition in Italian football. The match was played at the Stadio Olimpico in Rome on Sunday, 20 May 2012 between Juventus and Napoli. Napoli won the match 2–0, with Edinson Cavani and Marek Hamšík scoring. The cup victory was Napoli's fourth in the competition. The two teams also later faced each other in the 2012 Supercoppa Italiana, as Napoli were cup champions and Juventus were crowned 2012 Serie A Champions.

== Road to the final ==
Juventus		Round	Napoli
Opponent	Result	2011–12 Coppa Italia	Opponent	Result
Bologna	2–1 (a.e.t.)	Round of 16	Cesena	2–1
Roma	3–0	Quarterfinals	Inter	2–0
Milan	2–1 (A), 2–2 (a.e.t.) (H) (4–3 agg.)	Semifinals	Siena	1–2 (A), 2–0 (H) (3–2 agg.)

== Match ==
=== Details ===
20 May 2012
21:00 CEST

Juventus	0–2	Napoli
	Report	Cavani 63' (pen.); Hamšík 83'

Stadio Olimpico, Rome
Attendance: 61,803
Referee: Christian Brighi

Juventus	Napoli

GK	30	(Italy) Marco Storari	(yellow card) 62'
CB	15	(Italy) Andrea Barzagli
CB	19	(Italy) Leonardo Bonucci
CB	4	(Uruguay) Martín Cáceres
RM	26	(Switzerland) Stephan Lichtsteiner		(substituted off) 68'
DM	21	(Italy) Andrea Pirlo
CM	8	(Italy) Claudio Marchisio	(yellow card) 40'
CM	22	(Chile) Arturo Vidal
LM	28	(Paraguay) Marcelo Estigarribia
SS	10	(Italy) Alessandro Del Piero (c)		(substituted off) 68'
CF	23	(Italy) Marco Borriello	(yellow card) 64'	(substituted off) 72'
Substitutes:
GK	13	(Austria) Alexander Manninger
MF	7	(Italy) Simone Pepe		(substituted on) 68'
MF	20	(Italy) Simone Padoin
MF	22	(Italy) Emanuele Giaccherini
FW	14	(Montenegro) Mirko Vučinić		(substituted on) 68'
FW	18	(Italy) Fabio Quagliarella	(red card) 90'	(substituted on) 72'
FW	32	(Italy) Alessandro Matri
Manager:
(Italy) Antonio Conte

GK	1	(Italy) Morgan De Sanctis	(yellow card) 80'
CB	6	(Italy) Salvatore Aronica
CB	14	(Argentina) Hugo Campagnaro
CB	28	(Italy) Paolo Cannavaro (c)	(yellow card) 56'
RM	11	(Italy) Christian Maggio
CM	20	(Switzerland) Blerim Džemaili	(yellow card) 54'
CM	88	(Switzerland) Gökhan Inler
LM	18	(Colombia) Camilo Zúñiga
RW	17	(Slovakia) Marek Hamšík		(substituted off) 86'
LW	22	(Argentina) Ezequiel Lavezzi		(substituted off) 73'
CF	7	(Uruguay) Edinson Cavani		(substituted off) 90+3'
Substitutes:
GK	83	(Italy) Antonio Rosati
DF	2	(Italy) Gianluca Grava
DF	8	(Italy) Andrea Dossena		(substituted on) 85'
DF	21	(Argentina) Federico Fernández
DF	85	(Uruguay) Miguel Britos		(substituted on) 90+3'
FW	16	(Chile) Eduardo Vargas
FW	29	(North Macedonia) Goran Pandev		(substituted on) 73'
Manager:
(Italy) Walter Mazzarri

Assistant referees:
Giorgio Niccolai
Cristiano Copelli
Fourth official:
Mauro Bergonzi

== See also ==
- 2011–12 Juventus FC season
- 2011–12 SSC Napoli season
- 2020 Coppa Italia final - played between same clubs
- Juventus FC–SSC Napoli rivalry
