= Juan Camilo Zúñiga =

Colombian footballer (born 1985)

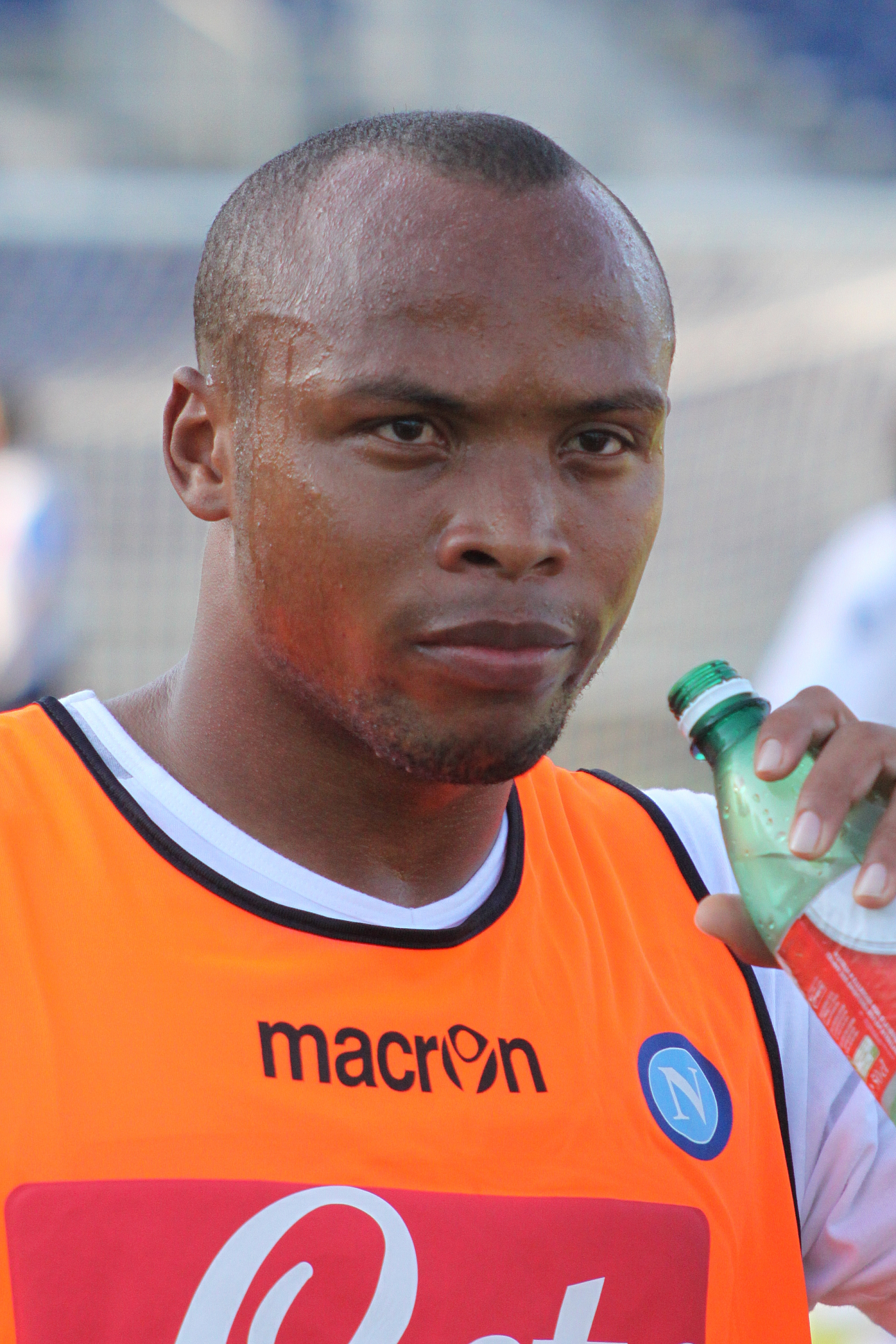
- Zúñiga with Napoli in 2009

Personal information
- Full name: Juan Camilo Zúñiga Mosquera
- Date of birth: 14 December 1985 (age 40)
- Place of birth: Chigorodó, Colombia
- Height: 1.72 m (5 ft 8 in)
- Position: Wing-back

Senior career*
Years	Team	Apps	(Gls)
2002–2008	Atlético Nacional	121	(9)
2008–2009	Siena	28	(0)
2009–2018	Napoli	125	(4)
2016	→ Bologna (loan)	9	(0)
2016–2017	→ Watford (loan)	21	(1)
2018	→ Atlético Nacional (loan)	4	(0)
Total		308	(14)

International career
2005	Colombia U20	4	(0)
2005–2015	Colombia	61	(1)
- * Club domestic league appearances and goals

Juan Camilo Zúñiga Mosquera (Latin American Spanish: [ˈxwaŋ kaˈmilo ˈsuɲiɣa mosˈkeɾa]; (Note: In isolation, Juan is pronounced [ˈxwan].) born 14 December 1985) is a Colombian former professional footballer who played as a wing-back.

Zúñiga has previously played for Italian clubs Siena and Napoli, having won two Coppa Italia titles with the latter; he was also sent on loan by Napoli to Bologna and Watford in 2016.

At international level, Zúñiga was part of the Colombia national football team that played in the 2014 FIFA World Cup, and has also represented his nation in three Copa América tournaments.

== Club career ==
=== Atlético Nacional ===
Born in Chigorodó, Antioquia, Zúñiga made his professional debut with Colombian giant Atlético Nacional. With Nacional, he gained three titles while being at the club for seven seasons. In total, he made 129 league appearances and scored 9 goals.

=== Siena ===
Zúñiga left Atlético Nacional in the summer of 2008 and was contracted by Italian side Siena. The transfer fee was €2.32 million. While at Siena, Zúñiga gave impressive performances, which attracted several clubs. In total, he made 28 leagues appearances, failing to score a goal.

=== Napoli ===
On 9 July 2009, Napoli signed the Colombian from Siena on a five-year deal for €8.5 million. Zúñiga then usually featured on the left-hand side of the 3–5–2 formation, as the left wingback, since Christian Maggio often occupies the right-hand side.

After the arrival of Andrea Dossena in January 2010, he lost his starting place and became a backup wingback on both flanks in the 2010–11 Serie A season.

Zúñiga scored his first Serie A goal for Napoli against Catania on 20 February 2011. His second goal was on 15 May 2011 against Internazionale in the 46th minute. His third, spectacular goal occurred against Genoa on 21 December 2011.

In late August 2013, Zúñiga suffered an injury. Weeks later, it was confirmed that he would be forced to have knee surgery and be out for a month, likely causing him to miss the rest of the season for 2013. Nevertheless, Zúñiga signed a new contract in October 2013.

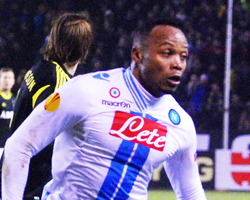
Zúñiga playing against AIK in the Europa League

In April 2014, it was announced after five months that Zúñiga had finally recovered from his knee injury and would continue regularly for Napoli.

In the first half of the 2015–16 Serie A season, he was left out of the squad.

==== Bologna (Loan) ====
On 13 January 2016, Zúñiga signed for Bologna on loan until the end of the season. He made his league debut for the club on 17 January 2016, in a 2–2 draw with Lazio. He replaced Emanuele Giaccherini in the 71st minute.

==== Watford (Loan) ====
On 13 July 2016, it was announced that Zúñiga would join Watford on a season-long loan, with an option to buy, reuniting with former Napoli teammates Miguel Britos and Valon Behrami, as well as manager Walter Mazzarri. On 18 September 2016, Zúñiga came on in the 83rd minute for Étienne Capoue and scored against Manchester United in his side's 3–1 win. In what was only his third appearance for Watford in the Premier League, he subsequently won a penalty, converted by Troy Deeney, for Watford's third goal. It was reported that Zúñiga returned to Naples after the loan, for his final year of contract.

=== Return to Atlético Nacional ===
After spending the first half of the 2017–18 season out of Napoli's squad, Zúñiga joined his first club Atlético Nacional on a free transfer on 30 January 2018.

=== Retirement ===
In 2018, Zúñiga announced his retirement from football.

== International career ==
Zúñiga played for Colombia in the 2005 World Youth Cup before progressing to the senior national team in 2005. He was regarded as being similar to other famous adventurous full-backs such as Cafu and Roberto Carlos by the Italian press during the under-20 World Youth Cup, because of his attacking nature. Zúñiga started most of Colombia 2014 World Cup qualifiers, only missing two games: against Venezuela after being given permission to leave the team for the birth of his son, and against Peru due to injury. He scored his first international goal during the qualifying campaign, which came in stoppage time in a 4–0 home win over Uruguay; he also assisted Radamel Falcao's opening goal during the match.

He was called up for the 2014 World Cup and appeared in four of the five matches that Colombia played in the tournament. On 4 July 2014, while Colombia's quarter-final match against hosts Brazil was nearing its end, Zúñiga landed his right knee into Neymar's lower back while challenging for the ball. Neymar was stretchered off and further examinations showed that Neymar suffered a fractured vertebra, ruling him out of the rest of the World Cup. After the match, which Colombia lost 2–1, Zúñiga insisted that he had not meant to injure Neymar. Neymar's teammate Thiago Silva defended Zúñiga, stating that he was not the type of player who would purposely cause an injury to any player. Conversely, Brazilian legend Ronaldo said that he believed that Zúñiga's violent challenge was a foul committed with the intention of causing harm. The day after the match, it was revealed that Zúñiga had sent a letter of apology to Neymar, saying that he was "deeply sorry and sad" for unintentionally causing the injury. Neymar later accepted the apology. Though Zúñiga publicly apologized to Neymar, his Instagram and Twitter accounts were flooded with racial insults and death threats addressed to him and his family by some Brazilian fans.

The following year, in the 2015 Copa América, Zúñiga participated in his team's second group match against Brazil, during which an on-pitch brawl broke out following Colombia's 1–0 victory.

== Style of play ==
A quick, energetic, versatile, and hard-working player, Zúñiga was capable of playing in several positions along the left flank, and was deployed as an attacking full-back, as a wing-back, and as a winger; a right-footed player, he was also capable of playing on the right, but from a tactical standpoint, he favoured the left flank, as it allowed him to take on and beat opponents in one on one situations, and subsequently cut inside and shoot on goal with his stronger foot. Once regarded as a possible heir of Cafu, he was mainly known for his pace, strength, technique, and dribbling skills, as well as his powerful striking ability from outside the area; these attributes made him a dangerous offensive threat, and enabled him both to score and create goals for teammates.

== Career statistics ==
=== Club ===
Appearances and goals by club, season and competition
Club	Season	League			Cup		League Cup		Other		Total	
Club	Season	Division	Apps	Goals	Apps	Goals	Apps	Goals	Apps	Goals	Apps	Goals
Atlético Nacional	2002	Categoría Primera A	4	0	—		—		—		4	0
Atlético Nacional	2003	Categoría Primera A	1	0	—		—		—		1	0
Atlético Nacional	2004	Categoría Primera A	23	0	—		—		—		23	0
Atlético Nacional	2005	Categoría Primera A	23	2	—		—		—		23	2
Atlético Nacional	2006	Categoría Primera A	24	1	—		—		—		24	1
Atlético Nacional	2007	Categoría Primera A	32	4	—		—		—		32	4
Atlético Nacional	2008	Categoría Primera A	14	2	—		—		—		14	2
Atlético Nacional	Total		121	9	—		—		—		121	9
Siena	2008–09	Serie A	28	0	0	0	—		—		28	0
Napoli	2009–10	Serie A	22	0	2	0	—		0	0	24	0
Napoli	2010–11	Serie A	27	2	2	0	—		8	0	37	2
Napoli	2011–12	Serie A	31	2	5	0	—		7	0	43	2
Napoli	2012–13	Serie A	32	0	1	0	—		7	0	40	0
Napoli	2013–14	Serie A	6	0	0	0	—		2	0	8	0
Napoli	2014–15	Serie A	7	0	0	0	—		3	0	10	0
Napoli	2015–16	Serie A	0	0	0	0	—		0	0	0	0
Napoli	Total		125	4	10	0	—		27	0	162	4
Bologna (loan)	2015–16	Serie A	9	0	0	0	—		—		9	0
Watford (loan)	2016–17	Premier League	21	1	0	0	1	0	—		22	1
Atlético Nacional (loan)	2018	Categoría Primera A	4	0	0	0	0	0	1	0	5	0
Career total			308	14	10	0	1	0	28	0	347	14

=== International ===
Scores and results list Colombia's goal tally first, score column indicates score after Zúñiga goal.

International goal scored by Juan Camilo Zúñiga
#	Date	Venue	Opponent	Score	Result	Competition
1.	7 September 2012	Estadio Metropolitano Roberto Meléndez, Barranquilla, Colombia	Uruguay	4–0	4–0	2014 FIFA World Cup qualification

== Honours ==
Atletico Nacional

- Categoría Primera A: 2005-I, 2007-I, 2007-II

Napoli

- Coppa Italia: 2011–12, 2013–14
