= 2016–17 Watford F.C. season =

English football team season

Watford
2016–17 season
- Owner: Gino Pozzo
- Chairman: Raffaele Riva
- Manager: Walter Mazzarri
- Stadium: Vicarage Road
- Premier League: 17th
- FA Cup: Fourth round (eliminated by Millwall)
- EFL Cup: Second round (eliminated by Gillingham)
- Top goalscorer: League: Troy Deeney (10); All: Troy Deeney (10)
- Highest home attendance: 21,118 v Manchester United (18 September 2016)
- Average home league attendance: 20,571
Home colours	Away colours

The 2016–17 season was Watford's 136th year in existence and second consecutive season in the Premier League. Watford also participated in the FA Cup and League Cup. The season covers the period from 1 July 2016 to 30 June 2017.

Walter Mazzarri took over as manager following the departure of Quique Sánchez Flores.

== Pre-season ==
In May 2016, Watford began to announce the pre-season friendlies.

10 July 2016 Friendly	Woking	1–1	Watford	Woking
17:00 BST	Carter 24'	Report	Berghuis 20'	Stadium: Laithwaite Community Stadium; Attendance: 1,280; Referee: Dean Treleaven

14 July 2016 Friendly	Stevenage	0–2	Watford	Stevenage
19:45 BST		Report	Capoue 50'; Sinclair 89'	Stadium: Broadhall Way; Referee: Darren Deadman

19 July 2016 Friendly	Union Berlin	1–3	Watford	Austria
15:00 BST	Thiel 70'	Report	Capoue 13'; Deeney 44' (pen.); Berghuis 84'	Stadium: Stadion St. Andrä

23 July 2016 Friendly	Anzhi Makhachkala	0–0	Watford	Austria
15:00 CEST		Report		Stadium: Sportplatz Gralla

30 July 2016 Friendly	Queens Park Rangers	2–0	Watford	London
15:00 BST	Polter 20'; Washington 82'	Report		Stadium: Loftus Road; Referee: Tim Robinson

6 August 2016 Friendly	Watford	2–2	Lorient	Watford
15:00 BST	Deeney 45' (pen.); Ighalo 58'	Report	Touré 61'; Philippoteaux 69'	Stadium: Vicarage Road; Attendance: 3,450; Referee: Jonathan Moss

=== Overview ===
Competition	Record							
Competition	G	W	D	L	GF	GA	GD	Win %
Premier League	38	11	7	20	40	68	−28	28.95
FA Cup	2	1	0	1	2	1	+1	50.00
EFL Cup	1	0	0	1	1	2	−1	0.00
Total	41	12	7	22	43	71	−28	29.27

Updated to match played 22 May 2017
Source: Competitions

== Competitions ==
=== Premier League ===
==== League table ====
Pos	Team	Pld	W	D	L	GF	GA	GD	Pts	Qualification or relegation
15	Swansea City	38	12	5	21	45	70	−25	41	
16	Burnley	38	11	7	20	39	55	−16	40	
17	Watford	38	11	7	20	40	68	−28	40	
18	Hull City (R)	38	9	7	22	37	80	−43	34	Relegation to EFL Championship
19	Middlesbrough (R)	38	5	13	20	27	53	−26	28	Relegation to EFL Championship

Source: Premier League
Rules for classification: 1) Points; 2) Goal difference; 3) Goals scored; 4) Play-offs (only if needed to decide champion, teams for relegation or teams for UEFA competitions).
(R) Relegated

==== Results summary ====
Overall								Home						Away					
Pld	W	D	L	GF	GA	GD	Pts	W	D	L	GF	GA	GD	W	D	L	GF	GA	GD
38	11	7	20	39	67	−28	40	8	4	7	25	28	−3	3	3	13	14	39	−25

Last updated: 21 May 2017.
Source: Premier League

==== Results by matchday ====
Matchday	1	2	3	4	5	6	7	8	9	10	11	12	13	14	15	16	17	18	19	20	21	22	23	24	25	26	27	28	29	30	31	32	33	34	35	36	37	38
Ground	A	H	H	A	H	A	H	A	A	H	A	H	H	A	H	A	A	H	H	A	H	A	A	H	A	H	H	A	H	H	A	H	A	H	A	A	A	H
Result	D	L	L	W	W	L	D	W	D	W	L	W	L	L	W	L	L	D	L	L	D	D	W	W	L	D	L	L	W	W	L	W	L	L	L	L	L	L
Position	5	13	18	10	9	11	11	10	9	7	8	8	8	10	7	11	12	10	13	14	14	14	13	10	12	12	13	14	12	9	10	10	10	13	15	16	16	17

Updated to match(es) played on 21 May 2017. Source: Statto.com
A = Away; H = Home; W = Win; D = Draw; L = Loss

==== Matches ====
13 August 2016 1	Southampton	1–1	Watford	Southampton
15:00 BST	Redmond 58'; Van Dijk (yellow card) 90+4'	Report	Capoue 9'; Guedioura (yellow card) 60'; Watson (red card) 76'; Gomes (yellow card) 87'	Stadium: St Mary's Stadium; Attendance: 31,488; Referee: Roger East

20 August 2016 2	Watford	1–2	Chelsea	Watford
15:00 BST	Deeney (yellow card) 19'; Capoue 55'; Britos (yellow card) 69'; Holebas (yellow card) 70'; Behrami (yellow card) 90+4'	Report	Cahill (yellow card) 20'; Costa (yellow card) 56', (goal) 87'; Batshuayi 80'; Hazard (yellow card) 90+2'	Stadium: Vicarage Road; Attendance: 20,772; Referee: Jon Moss

27 August 2016 3	Watford	1–3	Arsenal	Watford
15:00 BST	Prödl (yellow card) 17'; Ighalo (yellow card) 45+2'; Pereyra 57'; Deeney (yellow card) 60'; Amrabat (yellow card) 77'; Behrami (yellow card) 83'; Holebas (yellow card) 89'	Report	Cazorla 9' (pen.); Sánchez 40'; Özil 45+1'; Wilshere (yellow card) 90+2'	Stadium: Vicarage Road; Attendance: 20,545; Referee: Kevin Friend

10 September 2016 4	West Ham United	2–4	Watford	Stratford, London
15:00 BST	Antonio 5', 33'; Zaza (yellow card) 12'; Byram (yellow card) 85'	Report	Ighalo 41'; Behrami (yellow card) 42'; Deeney 45+2'; Capoue 53'; Holebas 63'; Okaka (yellow card) 86'	Stadium: Olympic Stadium; Attendance: 56,974; Referee: Martin Atkinson

18 September 2016 5	Watford	3–1	Manchester United	Watford
12:00 BST	Capoue 34'; Britos (yellow card) 77'; Holebas (yellow card) 77'; Zúñiga 83'; Deeney (yellow card) 86', (goal) 90+5' (pen.)	Report	Rashford 62'; Pogba (yellow card) 75'; Fellaini (yellow card) 88'; Depay (yellow card) 88'; Rooney (yellow card) 90+2'	Stadium: Vicarage Road; Attendance: 21,118; Referee: Michael Oliver

26 September 2016 6	Burnley	2–0	Watford	Burnley
20:00 BST	Hendrick 38'; Lowton (yellow card) 45+2'; Keane 50'	Report	Pereyra (yellow card) 22'; Holebas (yellow card) 37'; Success (yellow card) 65'	Stadium: Turf Moor; Attendance: 18,519; Referee: Mike Jones

1 October 2016 7	Watford	2–2	AFC Bournemouth	Watford
15:00 BST	Prödl (yellow card) 12'; Pereyra (yellow card) 28'; Deeney 50'; Behrami (yellow card) 56'; Success 65'	Report	Wilshere (yellow card) 20'; Wilson 31'; Smith (yellow card) 41'; Francis (yellow card) 45'; King 62'; Stanislas (yellow card) 89'	Stadium: Vicarage Road; Attendance: 20,575; Referee: Mike Dean

16 October 2016 8	Middlesbrough	0–1	Watford	Middlesbrough
13:30 BST	Barragán (yellow card) 21'; Stuani (yellow card) 38'; Ramírez (yellow card) 42'; De Roon (yellow card) 74'	Report	Holebas 54'; Amrabat (yellow card) 65'	Stadium: Riverside Stadium; Attendance: 28,131; Referee: Roger East

22 October 2016 9	Swansea City	0–0	Watford	Swansea
15:00 BST	Sigurðsson (yellow card) 49'; Britton (yellow card) 71'	Report	Capoue (yellow card) 45'	Stadium: Liberty Stadium; Attendance: 20,694; Referee: Paul Tierney

29 October 2016 10	Watford	1–0	Hull City	Watford
15:00 BST	Behrami (yellow card) 53'; Dawson 82' (o.g.)	Report	Mason (yellow card) 57'; Clucas (yellow card) 58'	Stadium: Vicarage Road; Attendance: 20,022; Referee: Jonathan Moss

6 November 2016 11	Liverpool	6–1	Watford	Liverpool
14:15 GMT	Mané 27', 60'; Coutinho 30'; Can 43'; Firmino 57'; Wijnaldum (yellow card) 88', (goal) 90+1'	Report	Holebas (yellow card) 56'; Janmaat 75'; Britos (yellow card) 80'	Stadium: Anfield; Attendance: 53,163; Referee: Michael Oliver

19 November 2016 12	Watford	2–1	Leicester City	Watford
15:00 GMT	Capoue 1'; Pereyra 12'; Zúñiga (yellow card) 21'; Britos (yellow card) 32'	Report	Mahrez 15' (pen.); Fuchs (yellow card) 53'; Drinkwater (yellow card) 65'; Gray (yellow card) 81'	Stadium: Vicarage Road Stadium; Attendance: 20,640; Referee: Neil Swarbrick

27 November 2016 13	Watford	0–1	Stoke City	Watford
12:00 GMT	Amrabat (yellow card) 24'; Britos (yellow card) 26' (yellow-red card) 90'; Holebas (yellow card) 40'; Behrami (yellow card) 90+2'	Report	Gomes 29' (o.g.)	Stadium: Vicarage Road Stadium; Attendance: 20,058; Referee: Robert Madley

3 December 2016 14	West Bromwich Albion	3–1	Watford	West Bromwich
15:00 GMT	McAuley (yellow card) 15'; Evans 16'; Brunt 34'; McClean (yellow card) 84'; Phillips 90+1'	Report	Kabasele 60'; Pereyra (red card) 84'; Deeney (yellow card) 85'	Stadium: The Hawthorns; Attendance: 22,244; Referee: Graham Scott

10 December 2016 15	Watford	3–2	Everton	Watford
12:30 GMT	Guedioura (yellow card) 7'; Okaka 36', 64'; Prödl 59'; Holebas (yellow card) 74'	Report	Deulofeu (yellow card) 14'; Lukaku 17', 86'; Baines (yellow card) 62'	Stadium: Vicarage Road; Attendance: 20,769; Referee: Anthony Taylor

14 December 2016 16	Manchester City	2–0	Watford	Manchester
20:00 GMT	Zabaleta 33' (yellow card) 75'; Silva 86'	Report	Prödl (yellow card) 21'; Capoue (yellow card) 73'	Stadium: Etihad Stadium; Referee: Kevin Friend

17 December 2016 17	Sunderland	1–0	Watford	Sunderland
15:00 GMT	Januzaj (yellow card) 36'; Van Aanholt 49'	Report	Behrami (yellow card) 45+1'; Kaboul (yellow card) 75'	Stadium: Stadium of Light; Attendance: 40,267; Referee: Robert Madley

26 December 2016 18	Watford	1–1	Crystal Palace	Watford
12:30 GMT	Holebas (yellow card) 53'; Deeney 71' (pen.); Britos (yellow card) 90+1'	Report	Cabaye 26'; C. Benteke (penalty missed) 36', (yellow card) 45'; Puncheon (yellow card) 45+2'; Zaha (yellow card) 87'	Stadium: Vicarage Road; Attendance: 20,304; Referee: Mark Clattenburg

1 January 2017 19	Watford	1–4	Tottenham Hotspur	Watford
13:30 GMT	Holebas (yellow card) 44'; Prödl (yellow card) 63'; Cathcart (yellow card) 83'; Kaboul 90+1'	Report	Kane 27', 33'; Alli 41', 46'	Stadium: Vicarage Road Stadium; Attendance: 20,882; Referee: Michael Oliver

3 January 2017 20	Stoke City	2–0	Watford	Stoke-on-Trent
20:00 GMT	Diouf (yellow card) 19'; Shawcross 45+3'; Crouch 49'	Report	Doucouré (yellow card) 76'; Kabasele (yellow card) 90+1'	Stadium: bet365 Stadium; Attendance: 27,010; Referee: Neil Swarbrick

14 January 2017 21	Watford	0–0	Middlesbrough	Watford
15:00 GMT	Okaka (yellow card) 78'; Britos (yellow card) 90+1'; Deeney (yellow card) 90+2'	Report	Fábio (yellow card) 90+2'	Stadium: Vicarage Road Stadium; Attendance: 20,659; Referee: Jonathan Moss

21 January 2017 22	AFC Bournemouth	2–2	Watford	Bournemouth
15:00 GMT	King 48'; Afobe 82'; S. Cook (yellow card) 90+4'	Report	Kabasele 24'; Deeney 64'; Holebas (yellow card) 70'; Kaboul (yellow card) 79'	Stadium: Dean Court; Attendance: 11,123; Referee: Lee Mason

31 January 2017 23	Arsenal	1–2	Watford	Holloway, London
19:45 GMT	Gabriel (yellow card) 21'; Monreal (yellow card) 25'; Iwobi 58'; Sánchez (yellow card) 86'	Report	Kaboul 10'; Deeney 13'; Prödl (yellow card) 66'; Okaka (yellow card) 88'; Cleverley (yellow card) 90'	Stadium: Emirates Stadium; Attendance: 60,035; Referee: Andre Marriner

4 February 2017 24	Watford	2–1	Burnley	Watford
15:00 GMT	Niang (yellow card) 6', (goal) 45+2'; Deeney 10'; Holebas (yellow card) 20'; Capoue (yellow card) 33'; Prödl (yellow card) 77'; Cathcart (yellow card) 90+4'	Report	Hendrick (red card) 6'; Barnes 78' (pen.)	Stadium: Vicarage Road; Attendance: 20,178; Referee: Michael Oliver

11 February 2017 25	Manchester United	2–0	Watford	Manchester
15:00 GMT	Mata 32'; Martial 60'; Valencia (yellow card) 90+2'	Report		Stadium: Old Trafford; Attendance: 75,301; Referee: Robert Madley

25 February 2017 26	Watford	1–1	West Ham United	Watford
17:30 GMT	Deeney 3' (pen.); Janmaat (yellow card) 36'; Cleverley (yellow card) 68'; Doucouré (yellow card) 79'; Holebas (yellow card) 83'	Report	Antonio (yellow card) 45+10' (yellow-red card) 86'; Kouyaté (yellow card) 65'; Ayew 73'	Stadium: Vicarage Road; Attendance: 20,702; Referee: Craig Pawson

4 March 2017 27	Watford	3–4	Southampton	Watford
15:00 GMT	Deeney 4', (yellow card) 83'; Okaka (yellow card) 44' (goal) 79'; Prödl (yellow card) 73'; Doucouré 90+4'	Report	Cédric (yellow card) 14'; Tadić 28'; Gabbiadini (yellow card) 33', (goal) 83'; Redmond 45+2', 86'	Stadium: Vicarage Road; Attendance: 20,670; Referee: Jonathan Moss

18 March 2017 28	Crystal Palace	1–0	Watford	Selhurst, London
15:00 GMT	Deeney 68' (o.g.)	Report	Cleverley (yellow card) 38'; Prödl (yellow card) 66'	Stadium: Selhurst Park; Attendance: 25,109; Referee: Martin Atkinson

1 April 2017 29	Watford	1–0	Sunderland	Watford
15:00 BST	Britos 59'; Capoue (yellow card) 90+3'	Report	Jones (yellow card) 72'; Khazri (yellow card) 77'; Koné (yellow card) 78'	Stadium: Vicarage Road; Attendance: 20,805; Referee: Lee Probert

4 April 2017 30	Watford	2–0	West Bromwich Albion	Watford
19:45 BST	Niang 13', (yellow card) 70'; Britos (yellow card) 40' (yellow-red card) 65'; Deeney 49'	Report	Robson-Kanu (yellow card) 43'; McClean (yellow card) 45+6'; Livermore (yellow card) 59'; Nyom (yellow card) 83'	Stadium: Vicarage Road; Attendance: 20,090; Referee: Paul Tierney

8 April 2017 31	Tottenham Hotspur	4–0	Watford	Tottenham, London
12:30 BST	Alli 33'; Dier 39'; Son 44', 55'	Report	Doucouré (yellow card) 34'	Stadium: White Hart Lane; Attendance: 31,706; Referee: Anthony Taylor

15 April 2017 32	Watford	1–0	Swansea City	Watford
15:00 BST	Capoue 42'	Report		Stadium: Vicarage Road; Attendance: 20,272; Referee: Lee Mason

22 April 2017 33	Hull City	2–0	Watford	Kingston upon Hull
15:00 BST	Niasse (red card) 25'; N'Diaye (yellow card) 42'; Marković 62' (yellow card) 66'; Clucas 71'; Robertson (yellow card) 81'	Report	Prödl (yellow card) 68'	Stadium: KCOM Stadium; Attendance: 20,432; Referee: Bobby Madley

1 May 2017 34	Watford	0–1	Liverpool	Watford
20:00 BST	Prödl (yellow card) 48'; Capoue (yellow card) 69'; Success (yellow card) 90+5'	Report	Lucas (yellow card) 44'; Can 45+2'	Stadium: Vicarage Road; Attendance: 20,959; Referee: Craig Pawson

6 May 2017 35	Leicester City	3–0	Watford	Leicester
15:00 BST	Ndidi 38'; Mahrez 58'; Albrighton 90+2'	Report		Stadium: King Power Stadium; Referee: Roger East

12 May 2017 36	Everton	1–0	Watford	Liverpool
19:45 BST	Barkley 56'	Report	Behrami (yellow card) 39'; Janmaat (yellow card) 39'; Holebas (yellow card) 70'	Stadium: Goodison Park; Attendance: 38,550; Referee: Kevin Friend

15 May 2017 37	Chelsea	4–3	Watford	Fulham, London
20:00 BST	Terry 22'; Aké (yellow card) 30'; Azpilicueta 36'; Batshuayi 49'; Chalobah (yellow card) 58'; Fàbregas 88'	Report	Holebas (yellow card) 3'; Amrabat (yellow card) 11'; Capoue 24'; Janmaat 51'; Okaka 74', (yellow card) 90+4'; Prödl (yellow card) 83' (yellow-red card) 90+1'; Deeney (yellow card) 90+3'	Stadium: Stamford Bridge; Attendance: 41,473; Referee: Lee Mason

21 May 2017 38	Watford	0–5	Manchester City	Watford
15:00 BST	Doucouré (yellow card) 45+1'	Report	Kompany 5'; Agüero 23', 36'; Fernandinho 41'; Jesus 58'	Stadium: Vicarage Road; Attendance: 20,829; Referee: Jonathan Moss

=== FA Cup ===
7 January 2017 Third round	Watford	2–0	Burton Albion	Watford
15:00 GMT	Kabasele 21'; Sinclair 77'	Report	Naylor (yellow card) 45+2'; Flanagan (yellow card) 62'; Brayford (yellow card) 80'	Stadium: Vicarage Road Stadium; Attendance: 13,270; Referee: Lee Mason

29 January 2017 Fourth round	Millwall	1–0	Watford	Bermondsey, London
12:00 GMT	Morison 85'; Wallace (yellow card) 90+6'	Report	Britos (yellow card) 90+6'; Mason (yellow card) 81'; Abdoulaye Doucouré (yellow card) 90+1'	Stadium: The Den; Attendance: 9,772; Referee: Martin Atkinson

=== EFL Cup ===
23 August 2016 Second round	Watford	1–2	Gillingham	Watford
19:45 BST	Ighalo 58'	Report	Byrne 82'; Dack 102'	Stadium: Vicarage Road; Attendance: 7,004; Referee: James Linington

== Staff ==
=== Squad information and statistics ===
Statistics correct as of 23 April 2017. (Note: From the start of pre-season to the end of the summer transfer window all players currently contracted to the club are listed. From the close of the summer transfer window all players who have been signed to the club since the close of the summer transfer window are listed. The following exceptions are made: a) if a player has appeared in a matchday squad prior to the end of the 2016 summer transfer window they will remain listed for the duration of the season b) players loaned out prior to the start of the season will not be listed until their return, with season-long loans omitted entirely - for players out on loan see the transfers section. Scholars with professional contracts are not listed unless they appear in a first-team matchday squad.)

No. = Squad number

Pos = Playing position

P = Number of games played

G = Number of goals scored

= Yellow cards

GK = Goalkeeper

DF = Defender

MF = Midfielder

FW = Forward

= Red cards

Yth = Whether player went through Watford's youth system

Joined club = Year that player became a Watford first team player (Note: For players who came through the club's youth system the date used refers to the year their professional contract begun, unless they appeared in a first-team match-day squad prior to that, in which case that date is used.)

Age = Current age

Left club during 2016–17

† Loan player (Note: A dagger is only displayed if the player was exclusively a loan player during the 2016–17 season. If they signed permanently over the course of the season then it is not displayed.)

2015–16 Watford player details
No.	Pos	Name	P	G	P	G	P	G	P	G	Yellow cards	Red cards	Age	Joined club	Yth	Notes
No.	Pos	Name	Premier League		FA Cup		League Cup		Total		Discipline		Age	Joined club	Yth	Notes
1	GK	Heurelho Gomes	33	0	0+1	0	0	0	33+1	0	1	0	45	2014	No	—
2	DF	Allan Nyom	0	0	0	0	1	0	1	0	0	0	38	2015	No	—
3	DF	Miguel Britos	26	1	2	0	0	0	28	1	7	2	41	2015	No	—
4	DF	Younès Kaboul	22	2	2	0	0	0	24	2	2	0	40	2016	No	—
5	DF	Sebastian Prödl	28+1	1	0+1	0	0	0	28+2	1	9	0	39	2015	No	—
6	DF	Adrian Mariappa	2+1	0	1	0	0	0	3+1	0	0	0	40	2016	Yes	—
7	MF	Nordin Amrabat	21+3	0	0	0	0	0	21+3	0	3	0	39	2016	No	—
8	MF	Tom Cleverley	12+1	0	0	0	0	0	12+1	0	3	0	37	2017	No	—
9	FW	Troy Deeney	29+3	10	1+1	0	1	0	31+4	10	6	0	38	2010	No	—
10	FW	Isaac Success	2+16	1	0	0	0	0	2+16	1	1	0	30	2016	Yes	—
11	MF	Valon Behrami	23+1	0	0	0	0	0	23+1	0	6	0	41	2015	No	—
12	MF	Kenedy	0+1	0	0	0	0	0	0+1	0	0	0	30	2016	No	—
13	GK	Rene Gilmartin	0	0	0	0	0	0	0	0	0	0	39	2014	No	—
14	DF	Juan Carlos Paredes	0	0	0	0	1	0	1	0	0	0	39	2014	No	—
15	DF	Craig Cathcart	13+2	0	1	0	0	0	14+2	0	3	0	37	2014	No	—
16	MF	Abdoulaye Doucouré	9+6	1	2	0	1	0	12+6	1	4	0	33	2016	No	—
17	MF	Adlène Guedioura	9+3	0	1	0	1	0	11+3	0	2	0	41	2015	No	—
18	DF	Juan Camilo Zúñiga	6+13	1	0	0	0+1	0	6+14	1	1	0	40	2016	No	†
19	FW	Jerome Sinclair	1+4	0	2	1	0	0	3+4	1	0	0	30	2016	Yes	—
20	FW	Matěj Vydra	0+1	0	0	0	1	0	1+1	0	0	0	34	2015	No	—
20	FW	Mauro Zárate	3	0	0	0	0	0	3	0	0	0	39	2017	No	—
21	MF	Ikechi Anya	0+1	0	0	0	1	0	1+1	0	0	0	38	2012	No	—
21	FW	M'Baye Niang	11	2	0	0	0	0	11	2	2	0	31	2017	No	—
22	MF	Daryl Janmaat	13+9	2	0+1	0	0	0	13+10	2	1	0	37	2016	No	—
23	MF	Ben Watson	0+4	0	1	0	1	0	2+4	0	0	1	41	2015	No	—
24	FW	Odion Ighalo	14+4	1	1	0	0+1	1	15+5	2	1	0	37	2014	No	—
25	DF	José Holebas	30	2	0	0	0	0	30	2	12	0	42	2015	No	—
26	DF	Brice Dja Djédjé	0	0	1+1	0	0	0	1+1	0	0	0	35	2016	No	—
27	DF	Christian Kabasele	5+8	2	1	1	1	0	7+8	3	1	0	35	2016	Yes	—
29	MF	Étienne Capoue	32	7	1	0	0+1	0	33+1	7	4	0	38	2015	No	—
30	GK	Costel Pantilimon	0+2	0	2	0	1	0	3+2	0	0	0	39	2016	No	—
31	DF	Tommie Hoban	0	0	0	0	1	0	1	0	0	0	32	2011	Yes	—
32	DF	Brandon Mason	0+1	0	2	0	0	0	2+1	0	1	0	29	2016	Yes	—
33	FW	Stefano Okaka	7+7	4	1	0	0	0	8+7	4	4	0	37	2016	No	—
34	GK	Giedrius Arlauskis	0	0	0	0	0	0	0	0	0	0	38	2015	No	—
35	MF	Carl Stewart	0	0	0+1	0	0	0	0+1	0	0	0	29	2016	Yes	—
37	MF	Roberto Pereyra	12+1	2	0	0	0	0	12+1	2	2	1	35	2016	No	—
39	FW	Michael Folivi	0+1	0	0	0	0	0	0+1	0	0	0	28	2016	Yes	—
42	DF	Andrew Eleftheriou	0+1	0	0	0	0	0	0	0	0	0	29	2016	Yes	—
—	DF	Ola Adeyemo	0	0	0	0	0	0	0	0	0	0	31	2016	No	—
—	GK	Charlie Bannister	0	0	0	0	0	0	0	0	0	0	29	2016	No	—
—	GK	Nathan Gartside	0	0	0	0	0	0	0	0	0	0	28	2016	Yes	—
—	FW	Alex Jakubiak	0	0	0	0	0	0	0	0	0	0	30	2014	Yes	—
—	FW	Ogo Obi	0	0	0	0	0	0	0	0	0	0	28	2016	Yes	—
—	MF	Rhyle Ovenden	0	0	0	0	0	0	0	0	0	0	28	2016	Yes	—
—	DF	Charlie Rowan	0	0	0	0	0	0	0	0	0	0	28	2016	Yes	—
—	DF	Connor Stevens	0	0	0	0	0	0	0	0	0	0	28	2016	Yes	—

=== Non-playing staff ===
- Head-coach: Walter Mazzarri
- Assistant coach: Nicolo Frustalupi
- Assistant coach: Claudio Nitti
- Assistant coach: Luca Vigiani
- Goalkeeping coach: Paolo De Toffol
- Goalkeeping coach: Alec Chamberlain
- Fitness coach: Giuseppe Pondrelli
- Technical director: Luke Dowling
- Chief scout: Filippo Giraldi
- Scout: Roberto Miggiano
- Analyst: Fabio Corradini
- Under-21 coach: Harry Kewell
- Under-21 assistant manager: Hayden Mullins
- Academy manager: Chris McGuane
- Lead professional development coach: David Horseman
- Academy head of coaching: Barry Quin
- Head of medical: Richard Collinge
- Head of sports science: Gianni Brignardello
- Sport scientist: Ben Dixon
- Head of Prevention and Osteopath: Daniel Reguera
- First-team Sports Rehabilitation: Mike Spanou
- First-team Sports Rehabilitation: Moto Watanabe
- Kit manager: Will Jones

Information correct as of 11 July 2016.

== Transfers ==
=== In ===
Date	Player	From	Fee	Ref
1 July 2016	Christian Kabasele (BEL)	Genk (BEL)	£6,000,000	
1 July 2016	Jerome Sinclair (ENG)	Liverpool (ENG)	£4,000,000	
1 July 2016	Isaac Success (NGA)	Granada (ESP)	£12,500,000	
21 July 2016	Brice Dja Djédjé (CIV)	Marseille (FRA)	£4,000,000	
8 August 2016	Charlie Bannister (ENG)	Aston Villa (ENG)	Free	
19 August 2016	Younès Kaboul (FRA)	Sunderland (ENG)	£4,000,000	
19 August 2016	Roberto Pereyra (ARG)	Juventus (ITA)	£13,000,000	
24 August 2016	Daryl Janmaat (NED)	Newcastle United (ENG)	£7,000,000	
29 August 2016	Stefano Okaka (ITA)	Anderlecht (BEL)	Undisclosed	
30 August 2016	Adrian Mariappa (JAM)	Crystal Palace (ENG)	Free transfer	
25 January 2017	Mauro Zárate (ARG)	Fiorentina (ITA)	Undisclosed	

=== Out ===
Date (Note: Where a player has been released, the date given is when their release was announced by Watford, not when their contract expired or when they joined their next club. The group of players released on 3 June 2016 had contracts that expired on 30 June 2016.)	Player	Transferred to (Note: Where a player has been released, the club they subsequently joined is listed, provided it occurred during the 2016-17 season.)	Fee	Ref
28 May 2016	Miguel Layún (MEX)	Porto (POR)	£6,000,000	
3 June 2016	Joel Ekstrand (SWE)	Bristol City (ENG)	Free transfer (Released)	
3 June 2016	George Byers (SCO)	Swansea City (WAL)	Free transfer (Released)	
3 June 2016	Josh Doherty (NIR)	Leyton Orient (ENG)	Free transfer (Released)	
3 June 2016	Uche Ikpeazu (ENG)	Cambridge United (ENG)	Free transfer (Released)	
3 June 2016	Jorell Johnson (ENG)	Hemel Hempstead Town (ENG)	Free transfer (Released)	
3 June 2016	Mahlondo Martin (ENG)	Kings Langley (ENG)	Free transfer (Released)	
3 June 2016	Bernard Mensah (ENG)	Aldershot Town (ENG)	Free transfer (Released)	
3 June 2016	Luke Simpson (ENG)	York City (ENG)	Free transfer (Released)	
3 June 2016	Alfie Young (ENG)	Hendon (ENG)	Free transfer (Released)	
1 July 2016	Gabriele Angella (ITA)	Udinese (ITA)	Undisclosed	
4 July 2016	José Manuel Jurado (ESP)	Espanyol (ESP)	£1,500,000	
12 July 2016	Juanfran (ESP)	Deportivo La Coruña (ESP)	Free transfer	
28 July 2016	Almen Abdi (SUI)	Sheffield Wednesday (ENG)	£3,500,000	
28 July 2016	Daniel Pudil (CZE)	Sheffield Wednesday (ENG)	£1,500,000	
10 August 2016	Essaïd Belkalem (ALG)	Orléans (FRA)	Free transfer (Released)	
27 August 2016	Matěj Vydra (CZE)	Derby County (ENG)	£12,500,000	
31 August 2016	Ikechi Anya (SCO)	Derby County (ENG)	£4,000,000	
31 August 2016	Sean Murray (IRL)	Swindon Town (ENG)	Free transfer	
31 August 2016	Allan Nyom (CMR)	West Bromwich Albion (ENG)	£4,000,000	
31 January 2017	Adlène Guedioura (ALG)	Middlesbrough (ENG)	£3,500,000	
31 January 2017	Odion Ighalo (NGA)	Changchun Yatai (CHN)	£20,000,000	

=== Loans in ===
Date from	Player	Loaned from	Date until	Ref
16 July 2016	Juan Camilo Zúñiga (COL)	Napoli (ITA)	End of Season	
30 August 2016	Kenedy (BRA)	Chelsea (ENG)	13 December 2016	
31 August 2016	Haviv Ohayon (ISR)	Maccabi Tel Aviv (ISR)	End of Season	
12 January 2017	Tom Cleverley (ENG)	Everton (ENG)	End of Season	
26 January 2017	M'Baye Niang (FRA)	AC Milan (ITA)	End of Season	

=== Loans out ===
Mathias Ranegie started the season on loan at Djurgårdens IF for the duration of the 2016 Allsvenskan season, having joined in February 2016.

Date from	Player	Loaned to	Date until	Ref
11 July 2016	Adalberto Peñaranda (VEN)	Udinese (ITA)	5 January 2017 (Note: On 5 January 2017, Adalberto Peñaranda was recalled from his loan at Udinese to join Malaga on loan.)	
27 July 2016	Obbi Oularé (BEL)	Zulte Waregem (BEL)	End of season	
27 July 2016	Dennon Lewis (ENG)	Woking (ENG)	End of season	
1 August 2016	Steven Berghuis (NED)	Feyenoord (NED)	End of season	
16 August 2016	Mario Suárez (ESP)	Valencia (ESP)	End of season	
26 August 2016	Tommie Hoban (IRL)	Blackburn Rovers (ENG)	End of season	
31 August 2016	Alex Jakubiak (SCO)	Fleetwood Town (ENG)	End of season	
5 January 2017	Adalberto Peñaranda (VEN)	Málaga (ESP)	End of season	
26 January 2017	Obbi Oularé (BEL)	Willem II (NED)	End of season	
30 January 2017	Alex Jakubiak (SCO)	Wycombe Wanderers (ENG)	End of season	
31 January 2017	Michael Folivi (ENG)	Coventry City (ENG)	End of season	
31 January 2017	Juan Carlos Paredes (ECU)	Olympiacos (GRE)	End of season	
31 January 2017	Jerome Sinclair (ENG)	Birmingham City (ENG)	End of season	
