= Miguel Britos =

Uruguayan footballer (born 1985)

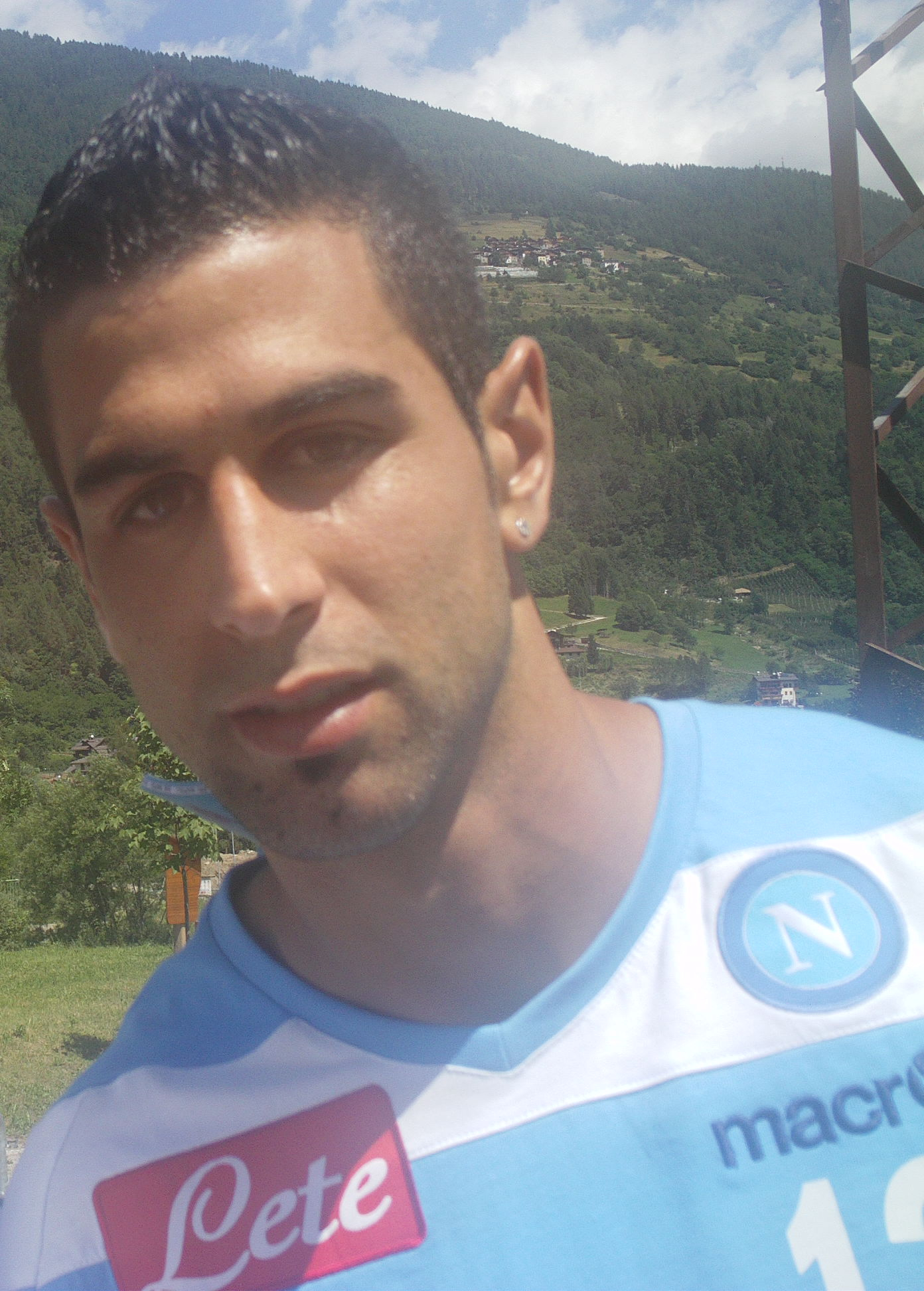
- Britos in 2011

Personal information
- Full name: Miguel Ángel Britos Cabrera
- Date of birth: 17 July 1985 (age 41)
- Place of birth: Maldonado, Uruguay
- Height: 1.88 m (6 ft 2 in)
- Position: Centre back

Senior career*
Years	Team	Apps	(Gls)
2005–2006	Fénix	12	(0)
2006–2007	Juventud	33	(3)
2007–2008	Montevideo Wanderers	26	(1)
2008–2011	Bologna	71	(4)
2011–2015	Napoli	68	(3)
2015–2019	Watford	66	(2)
- * Club domestic league appearances and goals as of 30 March 2019

Miguel Ángel Britos Cabrera (Spanish pronunciation: [miˈɣel ˈβɾitos]; (Note: In isolation, Britos is pronounced [ˈbɾitos].) born 17 July 1985) is a Uruguayan former professional footballer who played as a centre back.

== Club career ==
=== Fénix ===
Britos began his professional career playing with Fénix in 2005. After playing the 2005–06 Uruguayan Primera División season, his team was relegated to the Uruguayan Segunda División.

=== Juventud ===
On 1 July 2006, Britos was transferred to Juventud de Las Piedras, where he achieved the promotion to the 2007–08 Uruguayan Top Division season.

=== Wanderers ===
On 1 July 2007, Britos signed a new contract with Montevideo Wanderers.

=== Bologna ===
Britos then moved to Italy on 22 July 2008 where he played for Bologna in the Serie A, signing a five-year contract for a €2 million transfer fee. He made his Serie A debut on 21 September 2008 against Fiorentina. On 21 February 2009, he scored his first Serie A goal against Inter.

=== Napoli ===
Britos' talent did not go unnoticed, and he was subsequently purchased from Bologna by Napoli on 12 July 2011 in a €9 million transfer deal, signing a four-year contract. He scored his first goal for Napoli in a 2–0 home win over Chievo on 13 February 2012. Growing into an invaluable asset for Walter Mazzarri's side, Britos featured in the final of the Coppa Italia on 20 May 2012, as Napoli defeated Serie A champions Juventus 2–0.

On 23 May 2015, he headbutted Álvaro Morata in a 3–1 away defeat to Juventus, and was sent off.

=== Watford ===
On 22 July 2015, Britos joined newly promoted English side Watford on a three-year deal. He was sent off on his debut against Preston North End in the League Cup on 25 August 2015.

His contract with Watford was extended at the end of the 2017–18 season, running until June 2019, after the club exercised an option.

Britos left Watford in July 2019 and retired from football age 33, citing lack of motivation.

== Club statistics ==
As of match played 30 March 2019

Club	Season	League	Domestic League		Domestic Cups		Continental Cups		Total	
Club	Season	League	Apps	Goals	Apps	Goals	Apps	Goals	Apps	Goals
Fénix	2005–06	Primera División	12	0	-	-	-	-	12	0
Juventud	2006–07	Segunda División	16	1	-	-	-	-	16	1
Montevideo Wanderers	2007–08	Primera División	26	1	-	-	2	0	28	1
Bologna	2008–09	Serie A	14	1	2	0	-		16	1
Bologna	2009–10	Serie A	23	0	1	0	-		24	0
Bologna	2010–11	Serie A	34	3	0	0	-		34	3
Napoli	2011–12	Serie A	11	1	2	0	0	0	13	1
Napoli	2012–13	Serie A	22	0	1	0	3	0	27	0
Napoli	2013–14	Serie A	16	1	1	0	5	0	22	1
Napoli	2014–15	Serie A	17	1	4	0	12	0	33	1
Watford	2015–16	Premier League	24	0	3	0	0	0	27	0
Watford	2016–17	Premier League	27	1	2	0	0	0	29	1
Watford	2017–18	Premier League	12	1	0	0	0	0	12	1
Watford	2018–19	Premier League	3	0	3	0	0	0	6	0
Total	Career		259	13	19	0	22	0	291	13

== Honours ==
Juventud

- Torneo di Viareggio: 2006

Napoli

- Coppa Italia: 2011–12, 2013–14
- Supercoppa Italiana: 2014
