= Blerim Džemaili =

Swiss footballer (born 1986)

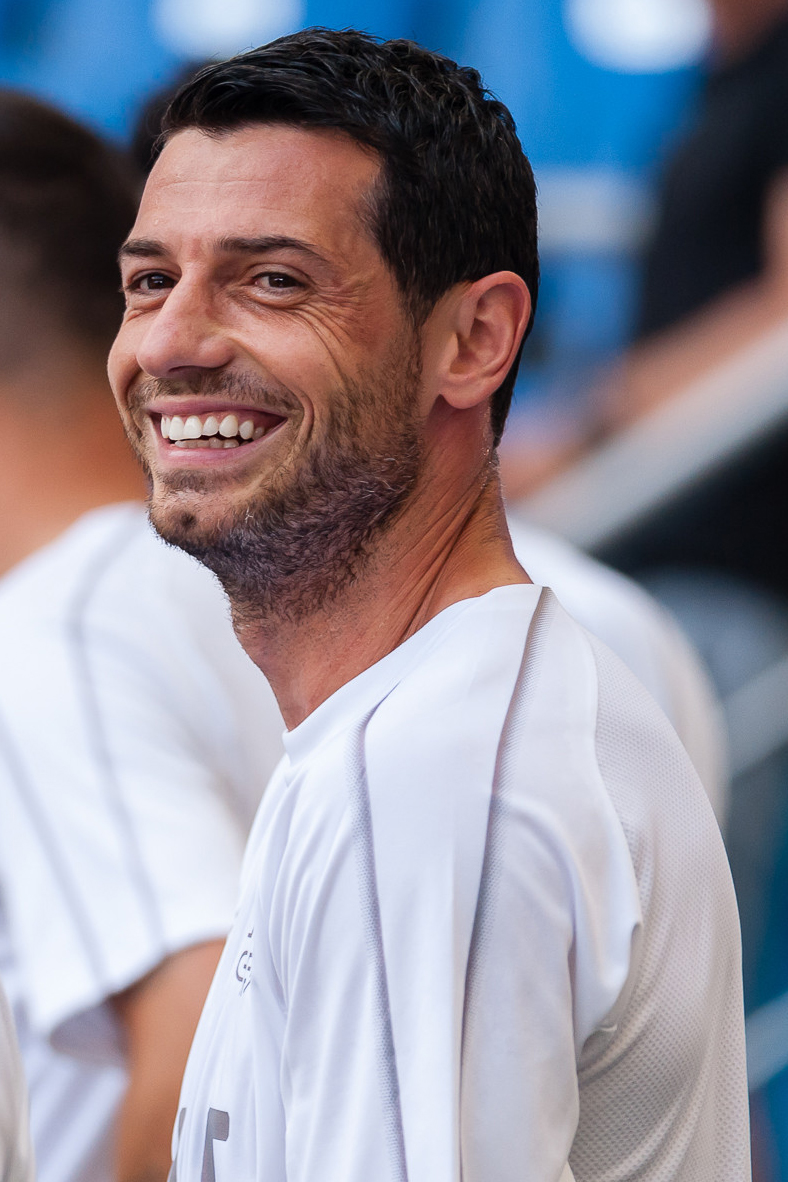
- Džemaili with Switzerland at the 2018 World Cup

Personal information
- Full name: Blerim Džemaili
- Date of birth: 12 April 1986 (age 40)
- Place of birth: Tetovo, SR Macedonia, Yugoslavia (now North Macedonia)
- Height: 1.80 m (5 ft 11 in)
- Position: Midfielder

Youth career
- 1995–1996: Oerlikon Zürich
- 1996–2000: FC Unterstrass
- 2000–2001: YF Juventus
- 2001–2003: Zürich

Senior career*
Years	Team	Apps	(Gls)
2003–2007	Zürich	111	(9)
2007–2009	Bolton Wanderers	0	(0)
2008–2009	→ Torino (loan)	23	(0)
2009–2010	Torino	7	(0)
2009–2010	→ Parma (loan)	19	(1)
2010–2011	Parma	30	(1)
2011–2014	Napoli	86	(16)
2014–2016	Galatasaray	11	(0)
2015–2016	→ Genoa (loan)	27	(3)
2016–2020	Bologna	88	(11)
2017	→ Montreal Impact (loan)	22	(7)
2020	Shenzhen FC	0	(0)
2020–2023	Zürich	59	(6)
Total		483	(54)

International career
2004–2008	Switzerland U21	16	(4)
2006–2018	Switzerland	69	(10)
- * Club domestic league appearances and goals

Blerim Džemaili (Albanian: Blerim Xhemaili, pronounced [blɛˈɾim dʒɛˈmaili]; Macedonian: Блерим Џемаили; born 12 April 1986) is a former professional footballer who played as a midfielder.

He began his career at FC Zürich, where he won the Swiss Super League twice. He subsequently spent most of his career in Italy, making 280 Serie A appearances for Torino, Parma, Napoli, Genoa and Bologna.

Born in Yugoslavia, Džemaili made his debut for the Switzerland national team in March 2006 and went on to make over 65 appearances. He was selected for their squads at the FIFA World Cup in 2006, 2014 and 2018, as well as UEFA Euro 2016.

== Childhood and early career ==
Džemaili was born to Fahrudin and Shemije Džemaili, an Albanian family from Bogovinje, in SFR Yugoslavia (now North Macedonia). At age four, he and his family migrated to Zürich, Switzerland. At age nine, he joined youth club Oerlikon Zürich for one year before moving to FC Unterstrass. At age 14, Blerim moved to third league team YF Juventus as a youth player before moving to FC Zürich in 2001. While with Zürich, Džemaili rose through the ranks and made the senior team at age 17.

In 2021, he revealed that he has been a fan of AC Milan since childhood. However, having had an opportunity to transfer to Milan in 2007, he chose to Bolton as his first foreign club due to desire to play in the English Premier League.

== Club career ==
=== Zürich ===
Džemaili began his senior career with Zürich. In his first season, he made 30 appearances for the club, scoring twice and creating three assists. Džemaili played either as a central or defensive midfielder. In the 2004–05 season, he helped the club win the Swiss Cup. Džemaili imposed a strong influence on the field as he possessed accurate passing capabilities as well as a fast and aggressive approach to the game. This led Džemaili to taking the role of captain during the 2005–06. Džemaili was 19 when he was chosen captain and is one of the youngest captains in Swiss football history. Džemaili led his team to glory as Zürich won the Swiss Super League in the 2005–06 and 2006–07 seasons.

After winning the Swiss cup and league, Džemaili moved to Premier League side Bolton Wanderers.

=== Bolton Wanderers ===
Džemaili signed a preliminary contract agreement with Bolton on 9 February 2007, meaning that he would sign for the Premier League outfit once his contract expired in the summer of 2007.

Former Bolton manager Sam Allardyce was quoted as saying, "Blerim is a fantastic player, who has played for the best team in Switzerland for the past three years. For someone so young, he has a wealth of experience. At the age of 20, he is the skipper of FC Zürich and is expected to become a regular international for Switzerland in the years ahead. He has hardly missed a game for FC Zurich since he started playing for them at the age of 17. I am excited by the prospect of working with Blerim next season." Džemaili, however, sustained a rupturing cruciate knee ligaments and was out for six months. He made his debut as a substitute in the club's FA Cup defeat to Sheffield United in what proved to be his only showing of the 2007–08 campaign. He later insisted that he would not change anything about his time at Bolton following his season-long loan move to Torino.

=== Torino and Parma ===
Džemaili joined Torino on a season-long loan deal, with an option to purchase outright, on 1 September 2008, making his debut with Torino on 24 September 2008, and became a staple fixture in their side for the season. In April 2009, Torino signed him outright from Bolton for €2 million. Torino announced that deal after their relegation to Serie B in June.

After having played just once for Torino at Coppa Italia, Džemaili completed a loan move to Parma on 31 August 2009, with an option to sign the 50% registration rights of the player at the end of season. In exchange, Daniele Vantaggiato moved to Turin on loan. first and second halves of Džemaili's registration rights were then bought by Parma in the summers of 2010 and 2011 for a total fee of €7 million.

=== Napoli ===
On 25 June 2011, Džemaili was signed by Napoli for €9 million with Fabiano Santacroce (loan) and Manuele Blasi (free) going the other way to Parma. Džemaili has been a consistent performer so far for Napoli. Džemaili has been well received by the fans as he has scored twice and assisted once in eleven appearances in the Serie A. His first was a right-footed shot from outside the box to the bottom left corner following a corner in a match against Lecce and his second was struck late to earn an equaliser as Napoli earned a point at Novara. Džemaili has also appeared six times in the UEFA Champions League group stages and helped Napoli into the final 16.

Džemaili had appeared regularly for the side in the Coppa Italia, and played the entire match in the final in which they defeated Juventus 2–0.

On 30 March 2013, he scored a hat-trick described by Goal.com as "spectacular", in a 5–3 win away at Torino. He netted the second goal in a 2–0 win against Genoa just a week later, making it four goals in two games. He also scored Napoli's third goal in a 3–0 win against Pescara on 27 April.

Džemaili was an unused substitute as Napoli won the 2014 Coppa Italia Final 3–1 against Fiorentina.

=== Galatasaray ===
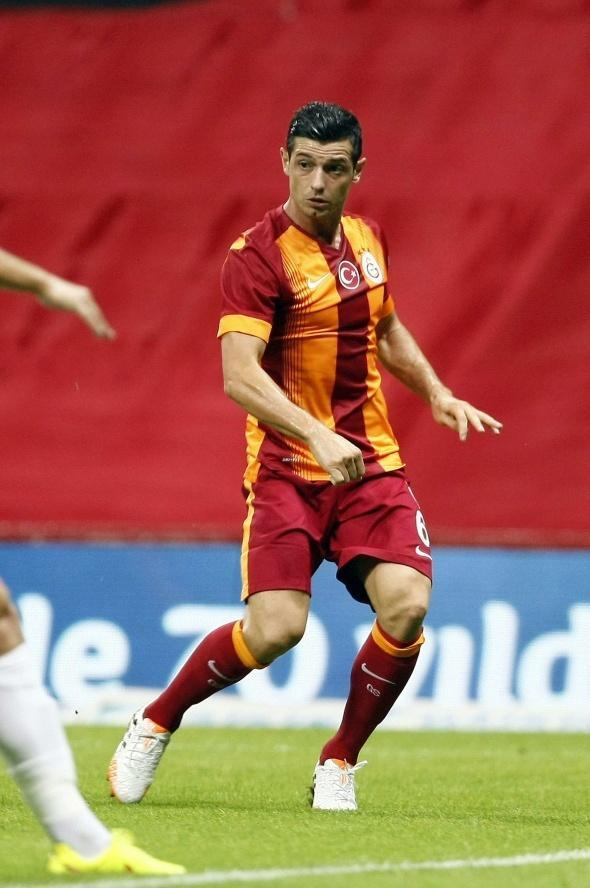
Džemaili playing for Galatasaray in 2014

On 1 September 2014, Džemaili signed a three-year contract with Turkish Süper Lig team Galatasaray for a €2.35 million transfer fee. He signed a three-year contract, worth €2.4 million, €2.1 million and €2.1 million respectively.

On 30 August 2015, Džemaili returned to Serie A to join Genoa on loan from Galatasaray. Galatasaray also bore €1.3 million of Džemaili's €2.1 million salary. On 27 September, Džemaili scored his first goal for the club with a direct free-kick that took a deflection off Giacomo Bonaventura. This was the lone goal in a 1–0 win over Milan. On 18 October, Džemaili received his first red card for the club, after getting two yellows (47th and 55th minute) in a 3–2 win over Chievo.

=== Bologna ===
On 17 August 2016, Džemaili returned to Italy again for Bologna, who paid Galatasaray a €1.3 million transfer fee. He was booked in matchday 33 on 22 April, missing the match on 30 April with the club mathematically avoiding the relegation by having 13 more points than Crotone with four matches remaining. Džemaili would join his new club Montreal Impact before the end of the Serie A season (and after Bologna secured the place of next season), making their 3–2 loss against Atalanta his last match.

==== Montreal Impact (loan) ====
On 9 December 2016, Montreal Impact president and Bologna chairman Joey Saputo announced that Džemaili would join the Major League Soccer (MLS) team on loan in the spring of 2017 as a Designated Player. On 9 May 2017, the loan was officially announced. On 19 January 2018, the Impact terminated the loan and Džemaili returned to Bologna. He had seven goals and 10 assists in 22 games for Montreal.

=== Shenzhen FC ===
On 31 January 2020, he transferred to Chinese club Shenzhen FC.

=== Zürich ===
In December 2020 Džemaili returned after 13 years to his youth club Zürich. He signed a contract for one and a half seasons.

At the conclusion of the 2022–23 season, Džemaili decided to retire from professional football.

== International career ==
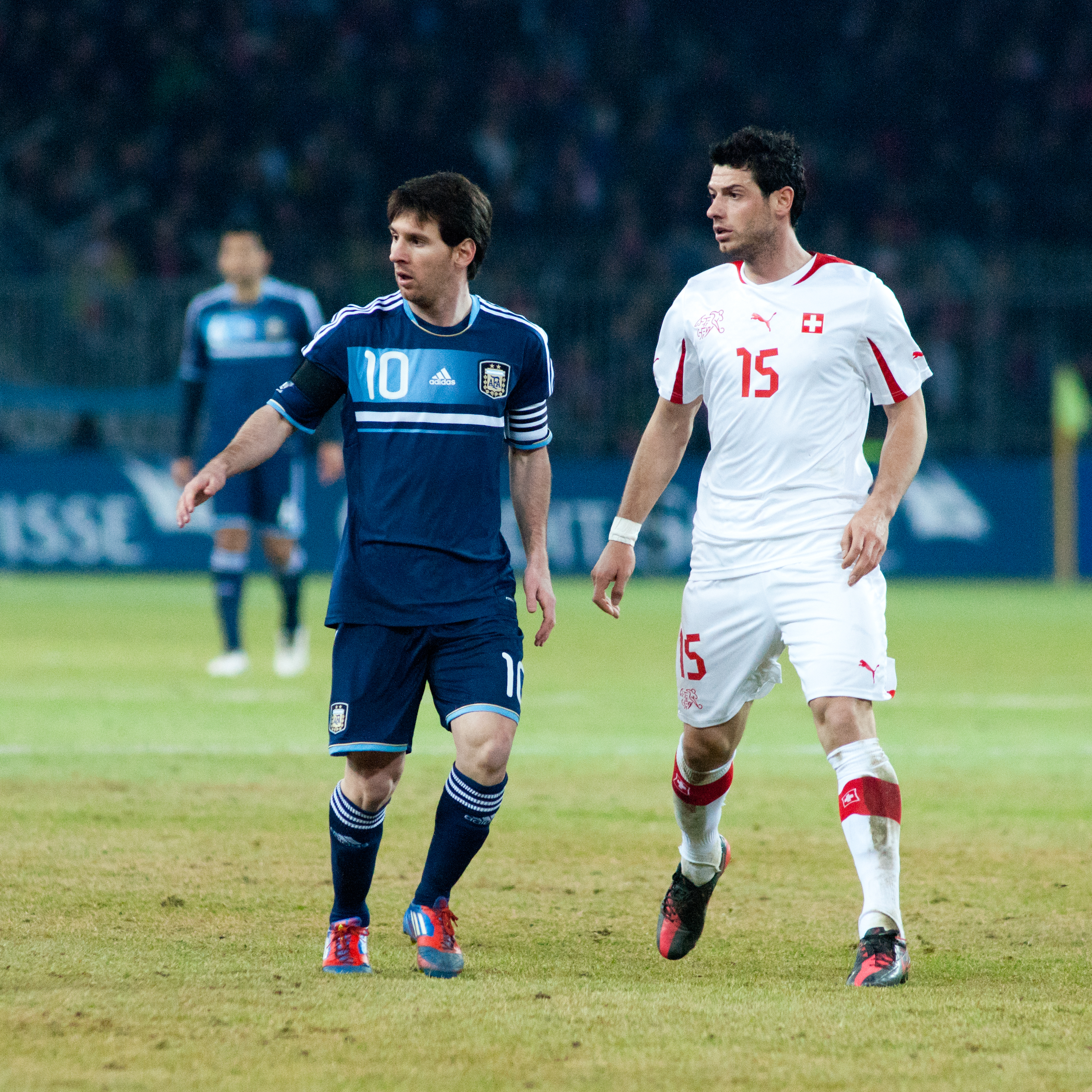
Džemaili marking Lionel Messi in a friendly against Argentina in 2012

Džemaili made his debut for the Switzerland national team in a friendly match against Scotland on 1 March 2006. He was a member of the Swiss squad at the 2006 FIFA World Cup without making an appearance. On 6 September 2013, Džemaili scored his first international goal from a penalty kick in a 4–4 home draw in a World Cup qualifier against Iceland. On 2 June 2014, Džemaili was named in Switzerland's 2014 World Cup squad by national coach Ottmar Hitzfeld. In the team's second match, against France, Džemaili came on at half-time for Valon Behrami. He scored the first direct free-kick of the tournament in a 5–2 loss to France. Džemaili scored his third international goal against San Marino on 10 October 2014 in UEFA Euro 2016 qualifying, heading-in Ricardo Rodríguez's corner to give the Swiss a 3–0 lead in an eventual 4–0 victory. Džemaili scored twice for Switzerland on 10 June 2015, the second of which came from a direct free-kick in a 3–0 friendly victory over Liechtenstein at Stockhorn Arena in Thun. Džemaili was part of the squad in Euro 2016 and 2018 World Cup qualification. He was included in the Switzerland national football team 23 man squad for the 2018 FIFA World Cup.

== Personal life ==
In 2015, Džemaili married Shkoder-born Albanian model Erjona Sulejmani who, in the same year, gave birth to their eldest son, Luan. By January 2018, they were divorced.

== Career statistics ==
=== Club ===
As of match played 24 November 2019

Appearances and goals by club, season and competition
Club	Season	League			Cup		Europe		Other		Total	
Club	Season	Division	Apps	Goals	Apps	Goals	Apps	Goals	Apps	Goals	Apps	Goals
Zürich	2003–04	Swiss Super League	30	2	0	0	0	0	–		30	2
Zürich	2004–05	Swiss Super League	26	1	1	0	0	0	–		27	1
Zürich	2005–06	Swiss Super League	32	3	5	3	4	1	–		41	7
Zürich	2006–07	Swiss Super League	23	3	1	0	2	0	–		26	3
Zürich	Total		111	9	7	3	6	1	0	0	124	13
Bolton Wanderers	2007–08	Premier League	0	0	1	0	—		–		1	0
Torino	2008–09	Serie A	30	0	2	0	—		–		32	0
Torino	2009–10	Serie A	0	0	1	0	—		–		1	0
Torino	Total		30	0	3	0	0	0	0	0	33	0
Parma	2009–10	Serie A	19	1	2	0	—		–		21	1
Parma	2010–11	Serie A	30	1	1	0	—		–		31	1
Parma	Total		49	2	3	0	0	0	0	0	52	2
Napoli	2011–12	Serie A	28	3	5	0	6	0	–		39	3
Napoli	2012–13	Serie A	34	7	0	0	7	2	–		41	9
Napoli	2013–14	Serie A	24	6	1	0	4	0	–		29	6
Napoli	Total		86	16	6	0	17	2	0	0	109	18
Galatasaray	2014–15	Süper Lig	11	0	5	1	4	0	–		20	1
Genoa (loan)	2015–16	Serie A	27	3	0	0	0	0	–		27	3
Bologna	2016–17	Serie A	31	8	2	1	0	0	–		33	9
Bologna	2017–18	Serie A	15	1	0	0	0	0	–		15	1
Bologna	2018–19	Serie A	28	1	2	1	0	0	–		30	2
Bologna	2019–20	Serie A	11	1	0	0	0	0	–		11	1
Bologna	Total		85	11	4	2	0	0	0	0	89	13
Montreal Impact (loan)	2017	MLS	22	7	0	0	0	0	3	1	25	8
Career total			421	48	29	6	27	3	3	1	480	58

=== International ===
As of 3 July 2018

Appearances and goals by national team and year
National team	Year	Apps	Goals
Switzerland	2006	5	0
Switzerland	2007	2	0
Switzerland	2008	1	0
Switzerland	2009	2	0
Switzerland	2010	0	0
Switzerland	2011	7	0
Switzerland	2012	7	0
Switzerland	2013	7	1
Switzerland	2014	9	2
Switzerland	2015	5	2
Switzerland	2016	10	1
Switzerland	2017	6	1
Switzerland	2018	8	3
Total		69	10

As of 27 June 2018
Scores and results list Switzerland's goal tally first, score column indicates score after each Džemaili goal.

List of international goals scored by Blerim Džemaili
No.	Date	Venue	Cap	Opponent	Score	Result	Competition
1	6 September 2013	Stade de Suisse, Bern, Switzerland	27	Iceland	4–1	4–4	2014 FIFA World Cup qualification
2	20 June 2014	Itaipava Arena Fonte Nova, Salvador, Brazil	35	France	1–5	2–5	2014 FIFA World Cup
3	14 October 2014	San Marino Stadium, Serravalle, San Marino	39	San Marino	3–0	4–0	UEFA Euro 2016 qualification
4	10 June 2015	Stockhorn Arena, Thun, Switzerland	41	Liechtenstein	1–0	3–0	Friendly
5	10 June 2015	Stockhorn Arena, Thun, Switzerland	41	Liechtenstein	3–0	3–0	Friendly
6	28 May 2016	Stade de Genève, Geneva, Switzerland	47	Belgium	1–0	1–2	Friendly
7	3 September 2017	Skonto Stadium, Riga, Latvia	58	Latvia	2–0	3–0	2018 FIFA World Cup qualification
8	23 March 2018	Olympic Stadium, Athens, Greece	62	Greece	1–0	1–0	Friendly
9	27 March 2018	Swissporarena, Lucerne, Switzerland	63	Panama	1–0	6–0	Friendly
10	27 June 2018	Nizhny Novgorod Stadium, Nizhny Novgorod, Russia	68	Costa Rica	1–0	2–2	2018 FIFA World Cup

== Honours ==
Zürich

- Swiss Super League: 2005–06, 2006–07, 2021–22
- Swiss Cup: 2004–05

Napoli

- Coppa Italia: 2011–12, 2013–14

Galatasaray

- Süper Lig: 2014–15
- Turkish Cup: 2014–15
