= Massimiliano Ammendola =

Italian footballer (born 1990)

Personal information
- Date of birth: 15 May 1990 (age 36)
- Place of birth: Pollena Trocchia, Italy
- Height: 1.73 m (5 ft 8 in)
- Position: Midfielder

Team information
- Current team: Puteolana

Youth career
- Napoli

Senior career*
Years	Team	Apps	(Gls)
2009–2012	Napoli	1	(0)
2009–2010	→ Crociati Noceto (loan)	3	(0)
2010–2011	→ Aversa Normanna (loan)	0	(0)
2012	Botev Vratsa	10	(1)
2013	Iraklis Psachna	6	(0)
2013–2015	Sol de América	14	(1)
2015–	Puteolana	0	(0)
- * Club domestic league appearances and goals as of 1 June 2014

Massimiliano Ammendola (born 15 May 1990) is a retired Italian footballer who played as a midfielder for Puteolana.

== Career ==
Ammendola started his career at Napoli. At the start of the 2009–10 season, he was loaned out for the entire season to Lega Pro Seconda Divisione team Crociati Noceto. He would return to Napoli at the start of the 2010–11 season, but was loaned out again, this time to Lega Pro Seconda Divisione team Aversa Normanna.

Ammendola returned to Napoli in January 2011. He made his first appearance for the senior Napoli squad on 21 April 2012 against Novara, coming on as a substitute for Marek Hamšík.

On 9 August 2012, Ammendola joined Bulgarian team Botev Vratsa. He made his A PFG debut on 26 August, in a 3–0 loss to Lokomotiv Sofia. On 22 September, Ammendola scored the only goal in a victory over Lokomotiv Plovdiv. On 11 December, his contract was terminated by mutual consent. Ammendola earned 10 appearances in the Bulgarian A Professional Football Group. After a year in Paraguay, Paraguayan Primera División, with Club Sol de América, where he played 14 appearances and scored, only, one goal, the contract at the end of June 2014 is not renewed and is currently a free transfer. Now trains in Pollena Trocchia (NA), and is followed by the agency AmSport. In 2015, decided to retire after which he remained without club for more than a year without any offers.
