= Walter Mazzarri =

Italian manager and retired association football player (born 1961)

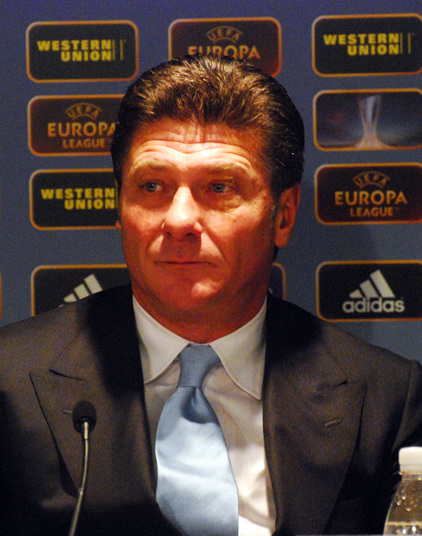
- Mazzarri with Napoli in 2012

Personal information
- Full name: Walter Mazzarri
- Date of birth: 1 October 1961 (age 65)
- Place of birth: San Vincenzo, Tuscany, Italy
- Height: 1.77 m (5 ft 10 in)
- Position: Midfielder

Team information
- Current team: Iraklis (head coach)

Senior career*
Years	Team	Apps	(Gls)
1981–1982	Pescara	26	(4)
1982	Cagliari	4	(0)
1982–1983	Reggiana	12	(1)
1983	Fiorentina	0	(0)
1983–1988	Empoli	91	(4)
1988–1989	Licata	8	(0)
1989–1990	Modena	21	(0)
1990–1991	Nola	30	(3)
1991–1992	Viareggio	11	(0)
1992–1994	Acireale	32	(1)
1994–1995	Torres	9	(0)
Total		244	(13)

Managerial career
- 2001–2002: Acireale
- 2002–2003: Pistoiese
- 2003–2004: Livorno
- 2004–2007: Reggina
- 2007–2009: Sampdoria
- 2009–2013: Napoli
- 2013–2014: Inter Milan
- 2016–2017: Watford
- 2018–2020: Torino
- 2021–2022: Cagliari
- 2023–2024: Napoli
- 2026–: Iraklis
- * Club domestic league appearances and goals

Walter Mazzarri (Italian pronunciation: [ˈvalter madˈdzarri]; born 1 October 1961) is an Italian professional football coach and former player. He is the current head coach of Greek Super League club Iraklis.

After a 14-year playing career with Italian clubs including Reggiana and Empoli, Mazzarri coached several smaller Italian sides and in 2007 took up a managerial position with Sampdoria. With the help of the attacking partnership of Antonio Cassano and Giampaolo Pazzini, he led the team to qualify for the UEFA Cup in his first season and subsequently reached the Coppa Italia final the next year. In 2009, he joined Napoli, where he implemented a 3–4–3 formation with which he later became associated. With the attacking trio of Ezequiel Lavezzi, Edinson Cavani and Marek Hamšík, nicknamed I tre tenori ("The three tenors"), he helped the team qualify for the UEFA Champions League for the first time in the club's history in 2011, and won the Coppa Italia the following season, the club's first trophy in over 20 years. In his final season with the team, he managed a second-place finish in Serie A, the club's best league finish in over 20 years. In 2013, he moved to Inter but was sacked halfway through his second season with the club. He later managed Torino in Serie A, and had one year in charge of Watford in England's Premier League in 2016–17. In 2023, after a gap year from his last management for Cagliari, he returned to Napoli but was sacked in February 2024 after three months.

== Playing career ==
Mazzarri, a midfielder and a product of Fiorentina's youth system, made his professional debut in 1981 for Pescara of Serie B, and played a short Serie A stint in Cagliari the following season, before being sold to Reggiana. He had his longest period at Empoli, who won promotion to Serie A for the first time during his time with the Tuscan side. After several spells with mostly minor teams, including a two-year stint with Acireale where he was part of the team that won a historic first promotion to Serie B, and then playing in the Italian second tier in 1993–94, Mazzarri ended his playing career in 1995 with Sassari Torres.

== Managerial career ==
=== Early years ===
Mazzarri started his coaching career as Renzo Ulivieri's assistant at Napoli in 1998. His first spell in charge came in 2001–02 for Sicilian Serie C2 team Acireale, where he had been a player from 1992 to 1994. Subsequently, he returned to his native Tuscany to coach Pistoiese of Serie C1 in 2002–03 and Livorno of Serie B in 2003–04, bringing the amaranto led by Cristiano Lucarelli back to Serie A. He was coach of Reggina from 2004 to 2007, leading the Calabrian side to Serie A survival in three consecutive seasons, the last obtained on the final day of the season despite an 11-point deduction. In May 2007, Mazzarri was made an honorary citizen of Reggio Calabria, after helping the club avoid relegation during the 2006–07 Serie A season.

=== Sampdoria ===
On 31 May 2007, he was announced as the new Sampdoria coach. He served as Sampdoria boss for two seasons, overseeing a considerable improvement in results, thanks to the likes of the attacking duo of Antonio Cassano, who publicly praised Mazzarri's coaching abilities, and Giampaolo Pazzini; the duo were likened to the partnership of Roberto Mancini and Gianluca Vialli, who won the scudetto with the club in 1991. Sampdoria's 2007–08 campaign ended in an impressive sixth place, which ensured qualification for the UEFA Cup. Mazzarri's fortunes declined slightly in 2008–09, as the Blucerchiati ended their campaign in 13th place; despite this, he managed to guide his team into the Coppa Italia final, notably defeating champions Inter 3–1 on aggregate in the semi-finals, before losing on penalties to Lazio in the final. Mazzarri left Sampdoria by mutual consent at the end of the 2008–09 season.

=== Napoli ===
On 6 October 2009 he was appointed manager of Napoli, replacing Roberto Donadoni. He finished his debut season in sixth place in Serie A, and was handed a new three-year contract at the end of the campaign.

In 2010–11, Mazzarri's Napoli finished third in the league and qualified directly for the group phase of the 2011–12 UEFA Champions League – their first time in Europe's premier competition in 21 years. His team were known for using an attacking 3–4–3 formation with a frontline three of Ezequiel Lavezzi, Marek Hamšík and Edinson Cavani, who were nicknamed I tre tenori ("The Three Tenors"); Mazzarri also employed variations upon this system on occasion, such as 3–5–2 formation, the 3–4–1–2, and the 3–5–1–1. They finished second in their Champions League group, behind Bayern Munich but ahead of Manchester City and Villarreal, to meet Chelsea in the last 16. Napoli won 3–1 at home in the first leg; they were subsequently beaten 4–1 at Stamford Bridge after extra time, being eliminated by the eventual champions.

Napoli won the 2012 Coppa Italia final over undefeated league champions Juventus on 20 May; this was Juventus's only loss of the season, and Napoli's first title in over 20 years. On 11 August that year, the club suffered a controversial 4–2 extra-time defeat to Juventus in the 2012 Supercoppa Italiana, which saw two Napoli players sent off as well as Mazzarri. He left the Azzurri on 19 May 2013, after leading them to a 2nd-place finish and a spot in the Champions League at the end of the 2012–13 Serie A season; this was the club's best league finish in over 20 years.

=== Inter Milan ===
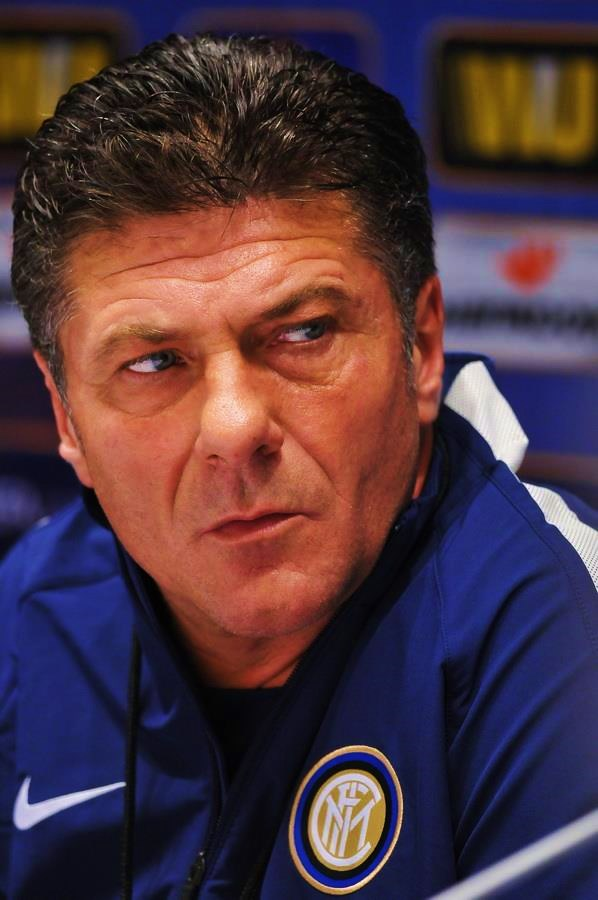
Mazzarri with Inter Milan in 2014

Mazzarri was officially appointed as the Inter Milan manager on 24 May 2013, after Andrea Stramaccioni was dismissed for a poor performance in the 2012–13 season. On 2 July 2014, he signed a one-year extension to tie him to the team until 30 June 2016.

He was sacked by Inter after a series of disappointing results on 14 November 2014, leaving the club in ninth place. He parted with the club before the 12th matchday, while they were five points below their season objective of the third position.

=== Watford ===
On 21 May 2016, Watford confirmed they had reached an agreement with Mazzarri to become head coach from 1 July 2016 on a three-year contract. He joined a club owned by his compatriot Giampaolo Pozzo, and worked without being able to speak English.

Mazzarri secured Watford's Premier League status that season, finishing one place above relegation in 17th, a four-place dip on their previous campaign. It was announced on 17 May 2017 that his contract would be terminated at the end of his first season at the club.

=== Torino ===
On 4 January 2018, Mazzarri was appointed manager of Torino, replacing Siniša Mihajlović. With a 7th-place finish in 2018–19 he led the Granata to the UEFA Europa League, where they were eliminated in the play-off round by Wolverhampton Wanderers.

On 4 February 2020, Mazzarri was dismissed following back-to-back 7–0 and 4–0 defeats to Atalanta and Lecce, respectively.

=== Cagliari ===
On 15 September 2021, Mazzarri signed a three-year contract with Serie A club Cagliari as their new head coach, replacing Leonardo Semplici. During his tenure, Cagliari failed to improve performances and found themselves deep in relegation trouble with three games to go, leading to Mazzarri's dismissal from his position on 2 May 2022.

=== Second stint at Napoli ===
On 14 November 2023, Napoli appointed Mazzarri as their new head coach on a seven-month contract, replacing Rudi Garcia, marking Mazzarri's return to Naples after ten years. He was sacked on 19 February 2024, after a 1–1 home draw to Genoa.

== Style of management and reception ==
Tactically, Mazzarri is known for using a fluid attacking 3–4–3 formation as a manager; at Napoli, his effective front three of Lavezzi, Hamšík, and Cavani were dubbed I tre tenori ("The Three Tenors"). He has also used variations of this system on occasion throughout his career, such as the 3–5–2 formation, the 3–4–1–2, the 3–4–2–1, and the 3–5–1–1, which made use of wing-backs in lieu of wide midfielders, who were crucial to the system's success. The wing-backs would push up to join the forwards in attack when the team were in possession, to help create or finish off chances. However, they would also subsequently track back off the ball, turning the defensive line-up into a back-five. During his second spell at Napoli, Mazzarri also used a 4–3–3 formation, which had been employed by his predecessor, Luciano Spalletti, during the 2022–23 season.

Although he earned a reputation as one of the best coaches in Serie A during the early 2010s, Mazzarri also became known in Italy for the excuses he made for poor performances during post-match interviews.

== Managerial statistics ==
As of match played 22 November 2026

Managerial record by team and tenure
Team	From	To	Record							
Team	From	To	G	W	D	L	GF	GA	GD	Win %
Acireale	17 September 2001	4 June 2002	31	10	10	11	32	31	+1	32.26
Pistoiese	4 June 2002	8 June 2003	39	12	11	16	35	45	−10	30.77
Livorno	8 June 2003	15 June 2004	47	20	20	7	76	46	+30	42.55
Reggina	15 June 2004	28 May 2007	123	37	39	47	140	173	−33	30.08
Sampdoria	31 May 2007	1 June 2009	99	38	29	32	134	117	+17	38.38
Napoli	6 October 2009	20 May 2013	182	89	50	43	292	203	+89	48.90
Inter Milan	24 May 2013	14 November 2014	58	25	21	12	99	57	+42	43.10
Watford	1 July 2016	21 May 2017	41	12	7	22	43	71	−28	29.27
Torino	4 January 2018	4 February 2020	90	37	25	28	132	109	+23	41.11
Cagliari	15 September 2021	2 May 2022	35	7	9	19	31	59	−28	20.00
Napoli	14 November 2023	19 February 2024	17	6	3	8	16	24	−8	35.29
Iraklis	12 May 2026	Present	12	2	4	6	14	23	−9	16.67
Total			773	294	228	251	1,044	958	+86	38.03

== Honours ==
=== Manager ===
Sampdoria

- Coppa Italia runner-up: 2008–09

Napoli

- Coppa Italia: 2011–12
- Supercoppa Italiana runner-up: 2012, 2023

Individual

- Enzo Bearzot Award: 2012
