= Lamberti =

Lamberti is a surname of Italian origin. Notable people with the surname include:

- Al Lamberti (born 1954), American former Sheriff of Broward County, in southeastern Florida
- Bonaventura Lamberti (1653–1721), Italian painter of the Baroque era
- Edoardo Lamberti (1895–1968), Italian cinematographer
- Giorgio Lamberti (tenor) (born 1938), Italian tenor
- Giorgio Lamberti (born 1969), Italian Olympic swimmer
- Giulio Lamberti (1895–1985), Italian rower
- Giuseppe Lamberti (born 1973), Italian coxswain
- Hermann-Josef Lamberti (born 1956), German banker and was Chief Operating Officer of Deutsche Bank until May 2012
- Hernán Agustín Lamberti (born 1984), Argentine professional footballer
- Ilario Davide Lamberti (born 1988), Italian footballer
- Isabel Lamberti, Dutch filmmaker
- Jean-Christophe Lamberti (born 1982), French professional football player
- Jeff Lamberti (born 1962), American politician from Iowa; state legislator
- Luciano Lamberti (born 1978), Argentine writer
- Luigi Lamberti (1769–after 1812), Italian composer of operas
- Medardo Lamberti (1890–1986), Italian rower
- Niccolò di Piero Lamberti (1370–1451), Venetian sculptor
- Niccolo Lamberti (fl. 14th century), Florentine painter
- Professor Lamberti (1892–1950), American vaudeville and burlesque performer
- Ralph J. Lamberti (1934–2025), American local politician from Staten Island, New York
- Tony Lamberti, American sound engineer
- Vincent Lamberti (c. 1927/1928–2014), American chemist and inventor

== Fictional characters ==
- Duca Lamberti, Italian detective created by Giorgio Scerbanenco and introduced in 1966

== See also ==
- Lambertini
