= 2006–07 Udinese Calcio season =

Udinese
2006–07 season
- Chairman: Franco Soldati
- Manager: Giovanni Galeone (until 16 January); Alberto Malesani (from 16 January to 30 June)
- Serie A: 10th
- Coppa Italia: Third round
- Top goalscorer: League: Antonio Di Natale (11); All: Antonio Di Natale (13)
Home colours	Away colours	Third colours

During the 2006–07 Italian football season, Udinese Calcio competed in Serie A.

== Season summary ==
Manager Giovanni Galeone was sacked on 16 January after disagreements with the club. He was replaced by Alberto Malesani, who led the club to an unimpressive 10th place in the final table. His contract was not extended at the end of the season, and Pasquale Marino was signed from Catania as his replacement.

== Competitions ==
=== Serie A ===
Pos	Team	Pld	W	D	L	GF	GA	GD	Pts	Qualification or relegation
8	Atalanta	38	12	14	12	56	54	+2	50	
9	Sampdoria	38	13	10	15	44	48	−4	49	Qualification to Intertoto Cup third round (Note: Sampdoria gained entry to the 2007 UEFA Intertoto Cup after Atalanta renounced. Sampdoria then qualified for the 2007–08 UEFA Cup first round.)
10	Udinese	38	12	10	16	49	55	−6	46	
11	Livorno	38	10	13	15	41	54	−13	43	
12	Parma	38	10	12	16	41	56	−15	42	

Rules for classification: 1) points; 2) goal difference; 3) number of goals scored.

== First-team squad ==
Squad at end of season

Note: Flags indicate national team as defined under FIFA eligibility rules; some limited exceptions apply. Players may hold more than one non-FIFA nationality.

No.	Pos.	Nation	Player
1	GK	(Italy) ITA	Morgan De Sanctis
2	DF	(Colombia) COL	Cristián Zapata
3	DF	(Italy) ITA	Damiano Zenoni
4	MF	(Italy) ITA	Gaetano D'Agostino
5	MF	(Nigeria) NGA	Christian Obodo
6	DF	(Italy) ITA	Andrea Coda
7	FW	(Brazil) BRA	Paulo Vitor Barreto
8	MF	(Italy) ITA	Giampiero Pinzi
9	FW	(Italy) ITA	Vincenzo Iaquinta
10	FW	(Italy) ITA	Antonio Di Natale
11	MF	(Ghana) GHA	Sulley Muntari
13	DF	(Italy) ITA	Emanuele Politti
14	DF	(Italy) ITA	Cesare Natali
15	FW	(Italy) ITA	Christian Tiboni
16	MF	(Cameroon) CMR	Kelvin Matute
17	DF	(Finland) FIN	Jarkko Hurme
18	FW	(Ghana) GHA	Asamoah Gyan
19	DF	(Brazil) BRA	Felipe
20	DF	(Italy) ITA	Andrea Dossena
21	DF	(Czech Republic) CZE	Tomáš Zápotočný
22	MF	(Uruguay) URU	Juan Surraco
23	FW	(France) FRA	Albin Hodža

No.	Pos.	Nation	Player
25	MF	(Italy) ITA	Andrea Migliorini
26	DF	(Italy) ITA	Marco Motta
27	MF	(Paraguay) PAR	José Montiel
28	GK	(Italy) ITA	Gennaro Terminiello (on loan from Sorrento)
29	MF	(Italy) ITA	Raffaele De Martino
30	DF	(Switzerland) SUI	Igor Djuric
31	DF	(France) FRA	Mohamadou Sissoko
32	FW	(Italy) ITA	Federico Gerardi
33	DF	(Italy) ITA	Giovanni Langella
34	DF	(Italy) ITA	Massimo Gotti
35	DF	(Italy) ITA	Olsen Gallinelli
40	FW	(Finland) FIN	Jani Virtanen
58	MF	(Italy) ITA	Daniele Fornaio
59	GK	(Italy) ITA	Carlo Sciarrone
66	DF	(Czech Republic) CZE	Tomáš Sivok
69	MF	(Brazil) BRA	Sodinha
70	GK	(Italy) ITA	Fabrizio Casazza
82	DF	(Serbia) SRB	Aleksandar Luković
86	DF	(Brazil) BRA	Guilherme Siqueira
87	MF	(Italy) ITA	Alessandro Osso
88	GK	(Italy) ITA	Marco Murriero
90	FW	(Argentina) ARG	Federico Laurito

=== Left club during season ===
Note: Flags indicate national team as defined under FIFA eligibility rules; some limited exceptions apply. Players may hold more than one non-FIFA nationality.

No.	Pos.	Nation	Player
12	GK	(Italy) ITA	Gabriele Paoletti (to Messina)
16	MF	(Argentina) ARG	Fernando Tissone (to Atalanta)
16	DF	(Italy) ITA	Michele Rinaldi (on loan to Rimini)
21	MF	(Colombia) COL	Abel Aguilar (on loan to Xerez)
22	DF	(Italy) ITA	Massimo Gotti (on loan to Ascoli)

No.	Pos.	Nation	Player
23	MF	(Finland) FIN	Roman Eremenko (on loan to Siena)
24	MF	(Paraguay) PAR	Claudio Vargas (on loan to Treviso)
25	MF	(Italy) ITA	Piermario Morosini (on loan to Bologna)
77	FW	(Brazil) BRA	Schumacher (on loan to Ciudad de Murcia)
