= Free agent =

Player who is eligible to sign with any club or franchise

In professional sports, a free agent is a player or manager who is eligible to sign with other clubs or franchises; i.e., not under contract to any specific team. The term is also used in reference to a player who is under a contract at present but who is allowed to solicit offers from other teams. In some circumstances, the free agent's options are limited by the league's rules.

Free agency was severely restricted in many sports leagues; instead, clubs had a reserve clause which allowed them to retain players indefinitely.

== Usage ==
=== Association football ===
In professional association football, a free agent is either a player that has been released by a professional association football club and now is no longer affiliated with any league, or a player whose contract with their current club has expired and is thus free to join any other club under the terms of the Bosman ruling.

Free agents do not have to be signed during the normal transfer window that is implemented in some countries' leagues. If they are signed by a team, the team signing them does not have to pay any fees – sometimes this is known as "a free transfer".

If a player is released from their club when the transfer window is closed, they cannot sign for another team until the window reopens. A notable case of this being Sol Campbell who in September 2009 was released from Notts County, just after a month from signing on a free transfer. He signed for his former club Arsenal in January 2010 during the winter transfer window, after spending a few months training with the team to maintain his fitness.

=== Australian Football League (AFL) ===
The Australian Football League introduced free agency at the end of 2012, after having had a brief "ten-year rule" in 1973 (when it was known as the Victorian Football League).

Out-of-contract players who are not within the top 25% paid players at their club will become unrestricted free agents after eight seasons of service at one club. Out-of-contract players who are within the top 25% paid players at their club become restricted free agents after eight seasons, then become unrestricted free agents after ten seasons. Clubs receive compensation in the form of draft picks for the loss of out-of-contract free agents, but players who are delisted become unrestricted free agents, regardless of length of service, and clubs are not compensated for the transfer of such free agents.

=== National Football League (NFL) ===
The NFL's current free agency system was introduced on March 1, 1993.

Unrestricted free agents

Unrestricted free agents (UFAs) are players with expired contracts that have completed four or more accrued seasons of service. They are free to sign with any franchise.

Restricted free agents

Restricted free agents (RFAs) are players who have three accrued seasons of service and whose contracts have expired. RFAs have received qualifying offers from their old clubs and are free to negotiate with any club until a deadline which occurs approximately a week prior to the NFL draft (for 2010 the deadline was April 15), at which time their rights revert to their original club. If a player accepts an offer from a new club, the old club will have the right to match the offer and retain the player. If the old club elects not to match the offer, it may receive draft-choice compensation depending on the level of the qualifying offer made to the player.

Exclusive rights free agents

Exclusive rights free agents (ERFAs) are players with two or fewer seasons of service time and whose contracts have expired. If their team tenders a qualifying offer (a one-year contract usually at league-minimum salary) the player has no negotiating rights with other teams, and must either sign the tender with the team or sit out the season.

Undrafted free agents

Undrafted free agents are players eligible for the NFL draft but were not selected; they can sign with any team.

"Plan B" free agency

Plan B free agency was a type of free agency that became active in the National Football League in February 1989 to 1992. Plan B free agency permitted all teams in the NFL to preserve limited rights of no more than 37 total players a season; if a player was a protected Plan B free agent, he was incapable of signing with another team without providing his old team the first opportunity to sign him again. The rest of the players were left unprotected, liberated to negotiate contracts with the rest of the teams in the league.

Eight players sued the NFL in U.S. federal court, stating that Plan B was an unlawful restraint of trade. In 1992, a jury found that Plan B violated antitrust laws and awarded damages to these players.

=== National Hockey League (NHL) ===
In the National Hockey League (NHL), between 2005 and 2008, the age of unrestricted free agency declined from 31 to 27. Under the old collective agreement, which expired in 2004, draft picks were awarded as compensation when a team lost an unrestricted free agent; however, under the current CBA teams losing unrestricted free agents do not receive any compensation.

In addition, any player at least 22 years of age who has not been selected in the NHL entry draft can sign with any team as a free agent. Any player who is not entry-level, but does not meet the qualifications of unrestricted free agency becomes a restricted free agent when his contract expires.

=== Major League Soccer (MLS) ===
Players eligible for free agency are 24 years of age and older with five MLS service years and are out of contract or have had their option declined.

=== National Women's Soccer League (NWSL) ===
Free agency has been available in the National Women's Soccer League since 2023; players eligible for free agency are required six years of service within the NWSL.

=== Major League Rugby (MLR) ===
In Major League Rugby, a player can be signed by any team as a free agent at 18 years old as long as they do not enroll in college. In case they do, they have to wait for MLR Draft at 21 years old.

== Deadlines and terms ==
In some leagues, free agency has deadlines. For example, under the most recent NHL Collective Bargaining Agreement, restricted free agents who do not sign contracts by December 1 of a given year will be ineligible to play in the National Hockey League for the balance of that season. However, other leagues (such as the National Basketball Association) have no such restrictions on signing periods in season, despite having a moratorium in the offseason.

In Europe, players can only move during transfer windows—during the close season and halfway through the league season. There are exceptions for unsigned professional players in the lower divisions.

=== Unrestricted free agent ===
Unrestricted free agents (UFA) are players not under contract with a team. They have either been released from their club, had the term of their contract expire without a renewal, or were not chosen in a league's draft of amateur players. These people, generally speaking, are free to entertain offers from all other teams in the player's most recent league and elsewhere and to decide with whom to sign a contract. Players who have been bought out of league standard contracts may have restrictions within that league, such as not being able to sign with the buy-out club for a period of time in the NHL, but are otherwise not restricted.

=== Restricted free agent ===
Restricted free agents (RFA) are typically players under contract with a team but are able to negotiate offers from other teams, with their current team able to match the terms of the newly offered contract. For a restricted free agent, some leagues require the comp team to offer to the original team one or more draft picks, when an offer is not matched, as compensation for losing the player.

=== Undrafted free agent ===
An undrafted free agent (UDFA) is a player in a professional sports league who is not selected in a draft. The term is most common in the National Football League (NFL), where rookies enter directly through the NFL draft and do not play in a minor league system. It can also occasionally be seen in the National Hockey League (NHL), which increasingly uses college hockey as a source; the NHL entry draft usually drafts players of high school age (i.e., junior leagues), which allows overlooked players who excel at the college level or in European professional leagues to bypass the draft and sign directly with the NHL. Notable undrafted players in sport include Martin St. Louis, Bruce Sutter, Ben Wallace, Kurt Warner, and Antonio Gates.

=== Legal provisions in the EU ===
In the European Union, the 1995 Bosman ruling by the European Court of Justice established the right of free agency for association football players in all EU member nations. The Bosman ruling has since been extended to cover other professional sports and players from Eastern Europe. Players were still tied to their clubs unless their contract ran out until the Webster ruling allowed players the opportunity to move between nations, though it does not allow free players to move within the national league in which they currently play.

== Other terminology ==
=== Free agent bust ===
A free agent bust is a highly touted or highly signed free agent who does not meet expectations. This can be for a variety of reasons such as being unable to adjust to the team's more demanding role, system or scheme of the team or if their time with team was affected by injuries.

==== NFL ====
In the NFL, numerous of notable highly touted free agents have signed with other teams, with the tenures being busts. One example is Larry Brown, most known from his two interception game which earned him a Super Bowl MVP award and championship in Super Bowl XXX, signed a five-year, $12.5 million free-agent deal with the Oakland Raiders. Brown played just 12 games with Oakland and then was waived after two seasons with the team. Another well known example is Albert Haynesworth. The highly coveted defensive tackle signed with the Redskins for a seven-year, $100 million deal which ultimately busted with his laziness and ineffectiveness on the team. He was let go after two years.

== See also ==
- Draft (sports)
