= Laurito (surname) =

Laurito is the surname of the following people:

- André Laurito (born 1983), German football player
- Federico Laurito (born 1990), Argentine football player
- Marisa Laurito (born 1951), Italian actress, singer and television personality
- Romina Laurito (born 1987), Italian rhythmic gymnast
