= Lorenzo Ghiberti =

Italian Early Renaissance artist (1378–1455)

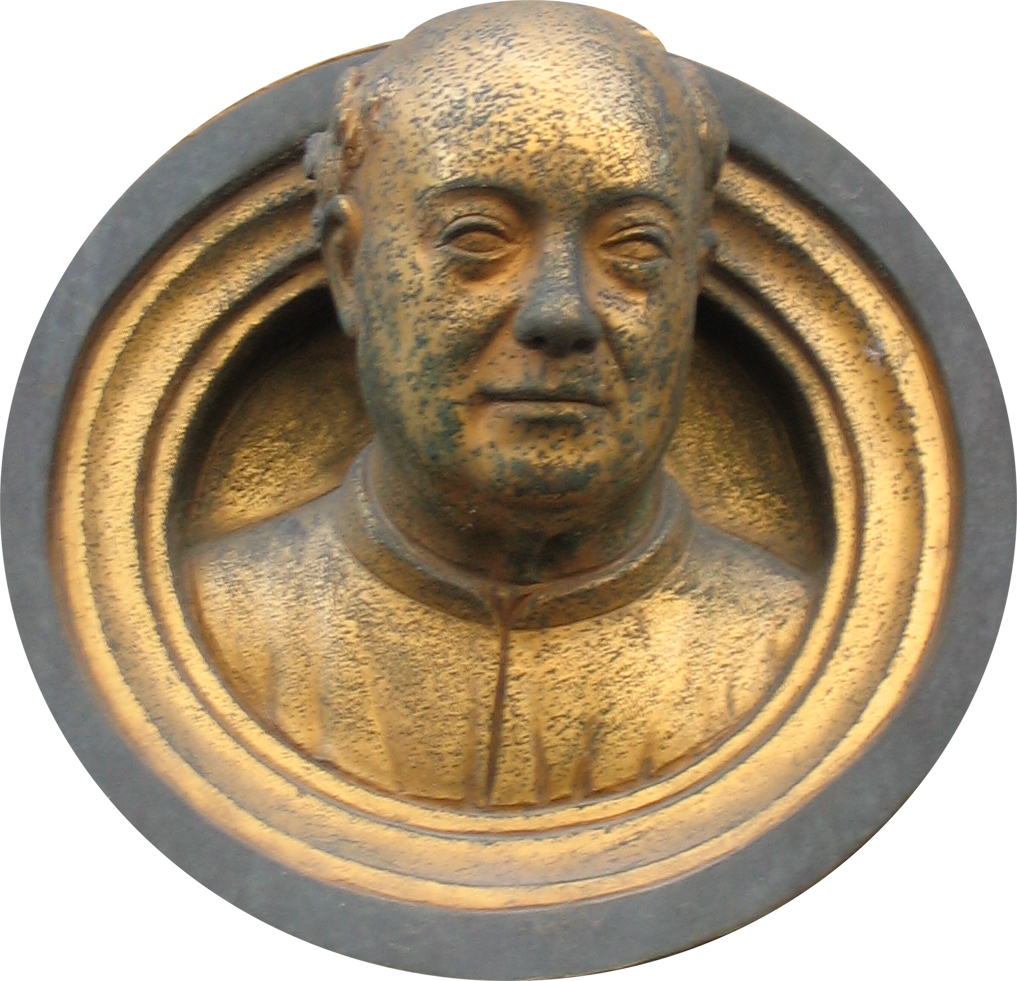
- Ghiberti on the Gates of Paradise. Modern copy in the Florence Baptistery.
- Born: Lorenzo di Bartolo; 1378; Florence, Republic of Florence
- Died: 1 December 1455 (aged 73–74); Florence, Republic of Florence
- Known for: Sculpture
- Notable work: Gates of Paradise, Florence Baptistery
- Movement: Early Renaissance

Lorenzo Ghiberti (UK: /ɡɪˈbɛərti/, US: /ɡiːˈ-/, Italian: [loˈrɛntso ɡiˈbɛrti]; né di Bartolo; 1378 – 1 December 1455) was an Italian Renaissance sculptor from Florence, a key figure in the Early Renaissance, best known as the creator of two sets of bronze doors of the Florence Baptistery, the later one called by Michelangelo the Gates of Paradise. Trained as a goldsmith and sculptor, he established an important workshop for sculpture in metal. His book of Commentarii contains important writing on art, as well as what may be the earliest surviving autobiography by any artist.

Ghiberti's career was dominated by his two successive commissions for pairs of bronze doors to the Florence Baptistery (Battistero di San Giovanni). They are recognized as a major masterpiece of the Early Renaissance, and were famous and influential from their unveiling.

== Early life ==
Ghiberti was born in 1378 in Pelago, a comune 20 km from Florence. It is said that Lorenzo was the son of Cione di Ser Buonaccorso Ghiberti and Fiore Ghiberti. However, there is some doubt about whether Cione was Ghiberti's actual father. At some point in their marriage, Fiore went to Florence and lived with a goldsmith by the name of Bartolo di Michele. Fiore and Bartolo maintained a common law marriage, so it is unknown who Ghiberti's biological father was. There is no documentation of Cione's death, but it is known that after his passing, Fiore and Bartolo married in 1406. Regardless, Bartolo was the only father Lorenzo knew, and they had a close and loving relationship. Bartolo was a clever and popular goldsmith in Florence, and trained Lorenzo in his trade. It was from this apprenticeship that Lorenzo learned the first principles of design.

Lorenzo was interested in many forms of art and did not confine himself to gold-working. He delighted in modelling copies of antique medals and also in painting. Lorenzo received formal training as a painter from Gherardo Starnina. He then went to work in the workshop of his stepfather. When the bubonic plague struck Florence in 1400, Ghiberti moved to Rimini.

In Rimini, he was fortunate enough to receive employment by Carlo I Malatesta, where he assisted in the completion of frescoes on the walls of the castle. It is believed that this is where he gained his love for the art of painting. However, shortly after his arrival, he received word from his friends back in his home town of Florence that the governors of the Baptistery were holding a competition and sending for masters who were skilled in bronze working. Despite his great appreciation for painting, Ghiberti asked Malatesta for leave. In 1401, he headed back to Florence to participate in a competition that was being held for the commission to make the second pair of bronze doors for the Baptistery of the Cathedral of Florence.

=== Florence Baptistery doors ===
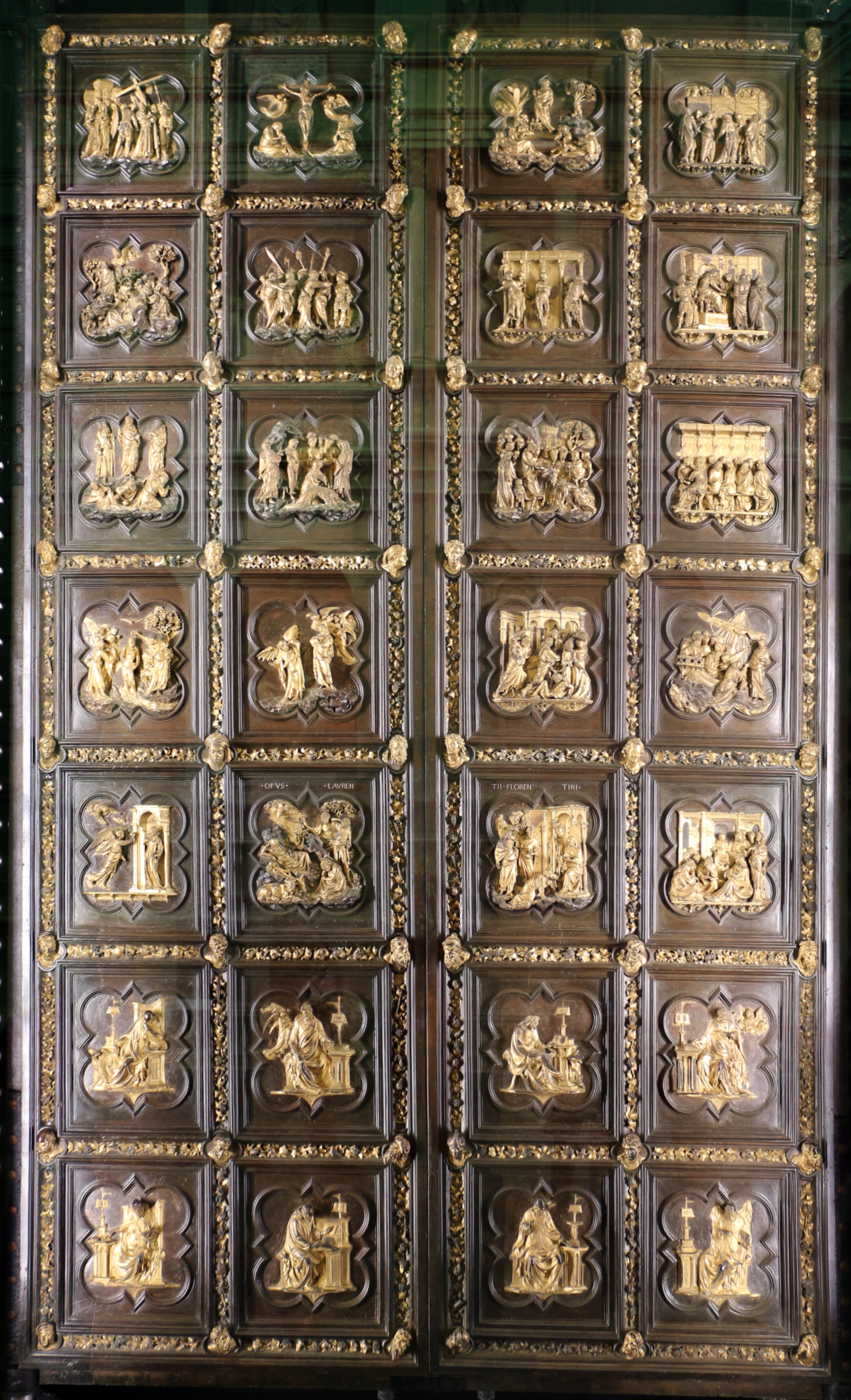
Ghiberti's first door from the North side of the Baptistry now in the Museo dell'Opera del Duomo

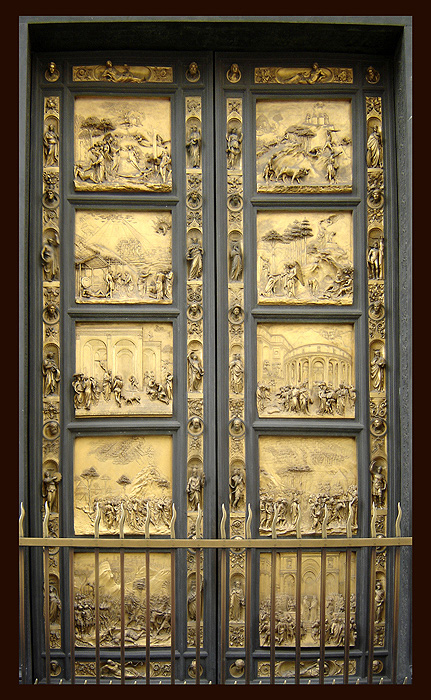
The copy of the Doors of Paradise on the East side of the Baptistry

Ghiberti first became famous when, as a 21-year-old, he won the 1401 competition for the first set of bronze doors, with Brunelleschi as the runner-up. The original plan was for the doors to depict scenes from the Old Testament, but the plan was changed to depict scenes from the New Testament instead. However, the trial piece, which survives, depicts the sacrifice of Isaac.

To carry out this commission, he set up a large workshop in which many artists trained, including Donatello, Masolino, Paolo Uccello, and Antonio del Pollaiuolo. When his first set of twenty-eight panels was complete, Ghiberti was commissioned to produce a second set for another doorway in the church, this time with scenes from the Old Testament, as originally intended for his first set. Instead of twenty-eight scenes, he produced ten rectangular scenes in a completely different style. These were more naturalistic, with perspective and a greater idealization of the subject. Dubbed "The Gates of Paradise" by Michelangelo, this second set remains a major monument of the age of Renaissance humanism.

The Gates of Paradise had ten panels with several episodes from a particular story from the Old Testament portrayed on each of them. The list below shows where each story is placed on the Gates of Paradise.

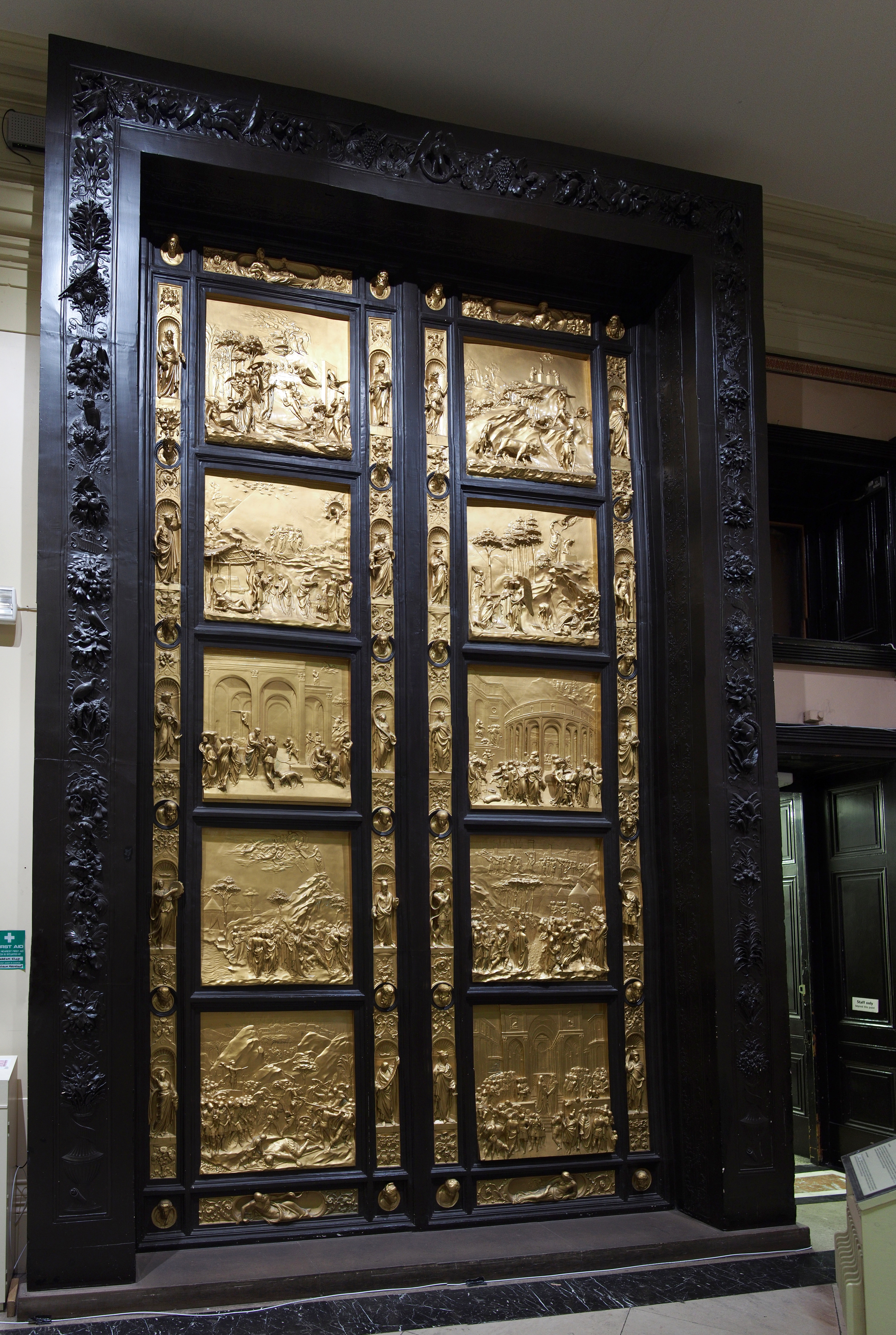

Doors of Paradise Panels (in order)
Adam & Eve	Cain and Abel
Noah	Abraham and Isaac
Jacob and Esau	Joseph
Moses	Joshua
David	Solomon

== Gates of Paradise multiple descriptive panels ==
The Story of Adam and Eve (Panel)

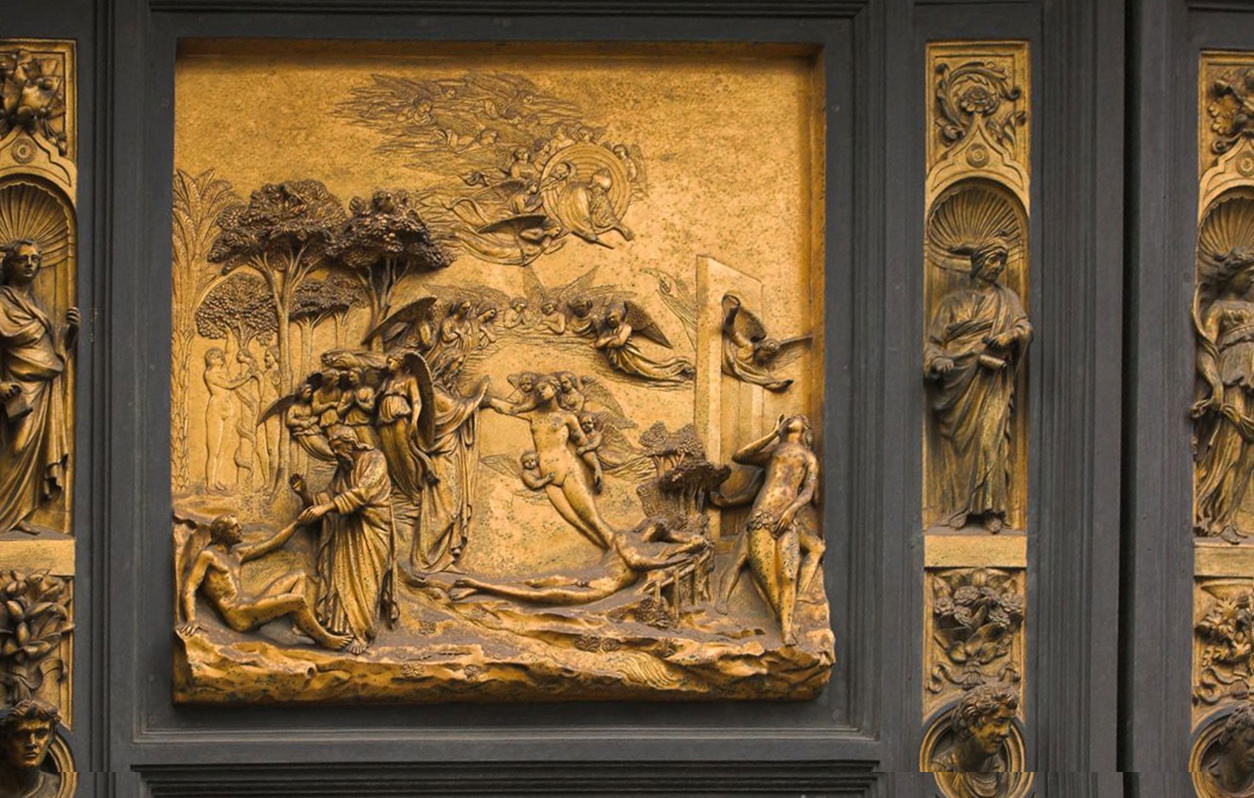

In the beginning of Genesis, God created the Universe (shown on the top of the image). When he created the universe, he created “The Garden of Eden”. This is where he created the first humans, Adam and Eve. Adam and Eve are eating an apple from the forbidden tree. Eve was tricked by Lucifer, God's fallen angel, who took the form of a serpent. Lucifer told Eve she would be like God if she ate the forbidden fruit (shown on left middle side). Lucifer, God's most beautiful angel, became a fallen angel and the devil (shown on the bottom left).

The Story of Cain and Abel (Panel)
Cain and Abel were the sons of Adam, the first man. Abel was younger than Cain. Cain was enraged because God preferred Abel's sacrifice over his (shown at the top of the photograph). Abel was known to be peaceful and was sitting calmly with the herd (shown on the middle left side). Cain tricked Abel to follow him and murders him (shown on the bottom).

The Story of Noah (Panel)
God did not like that the world was full of violence. He told Noah he was going to destroy the earth with a flood, and that Noah needed to build an Ark (shown by the waves in the photograph). He was told to bring two of each kind of animal and his family (shown on the left, right, and in the middle area). Moses is lying next to a barrel, signifying the drunks (shown on the bottom left).Moses is also offering a sacrifice (shown on the bottom right).

The Story of Abraham (Panel)

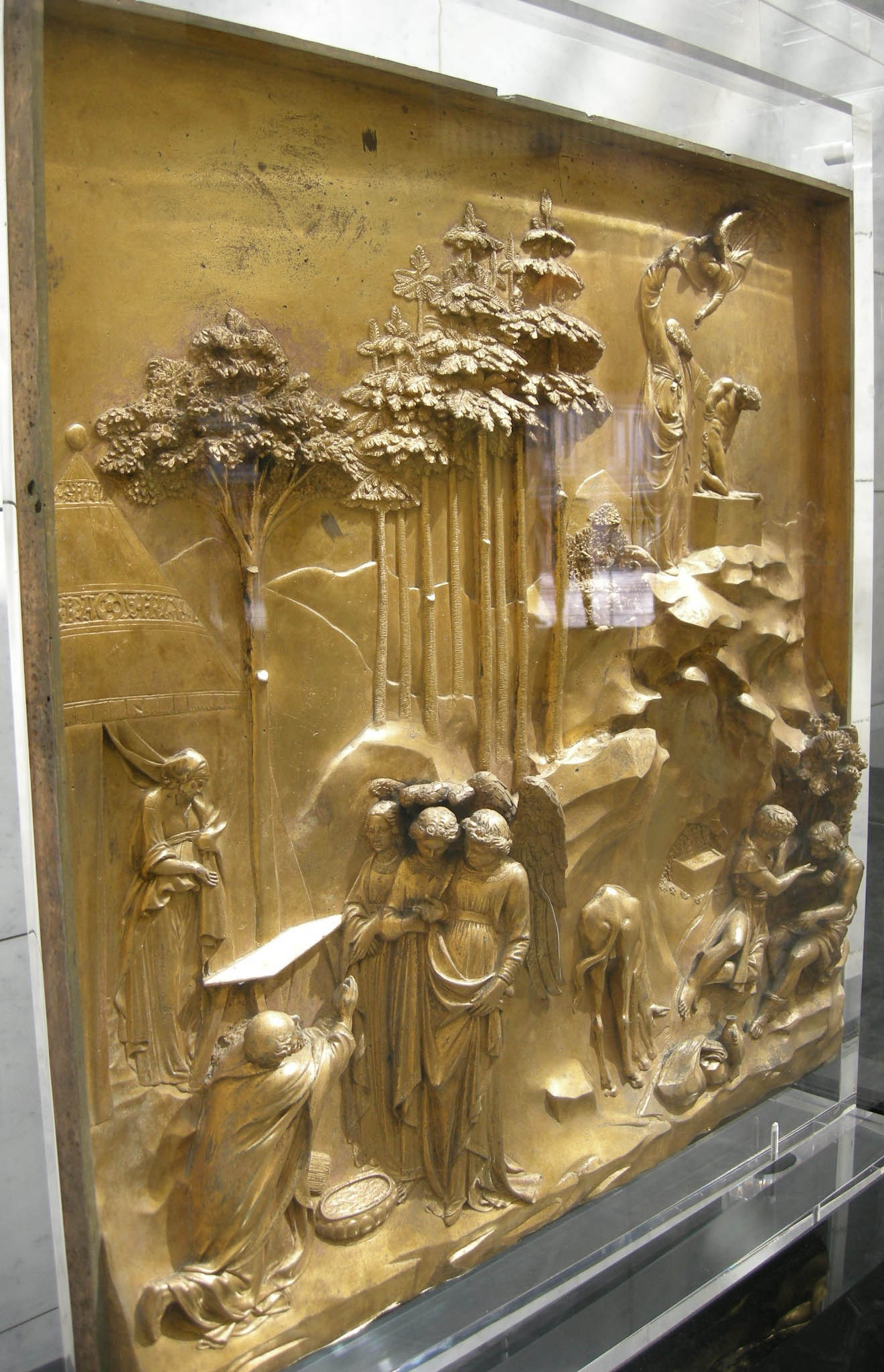

Three men came to Abraham. He clothed them, fed them, and gave them drinks. The three men were angels, and they revealed themselves as messengers of God (shown at the bottom left). They told him that his wife, Sarah, who was 80 years old, would bear a child. Once they had the child, named Isaac, God ordered Abraham to sacrifice him, but Abraham was ordered to stop by an angel (shown at the top).

The Story of Isaac (Panel)
Isaac was the son of Abraham. He was going to be sacrificed before an angel stopped Abraham from doing so. Jacob, Isaac's son, is receiving Issac's blessing (shown on the right). Rebecca, Isaac's wife, is listening to God tell her of her two sons who will have conflicts (shown on the rooftop).

The Story of Joseph (Panel)

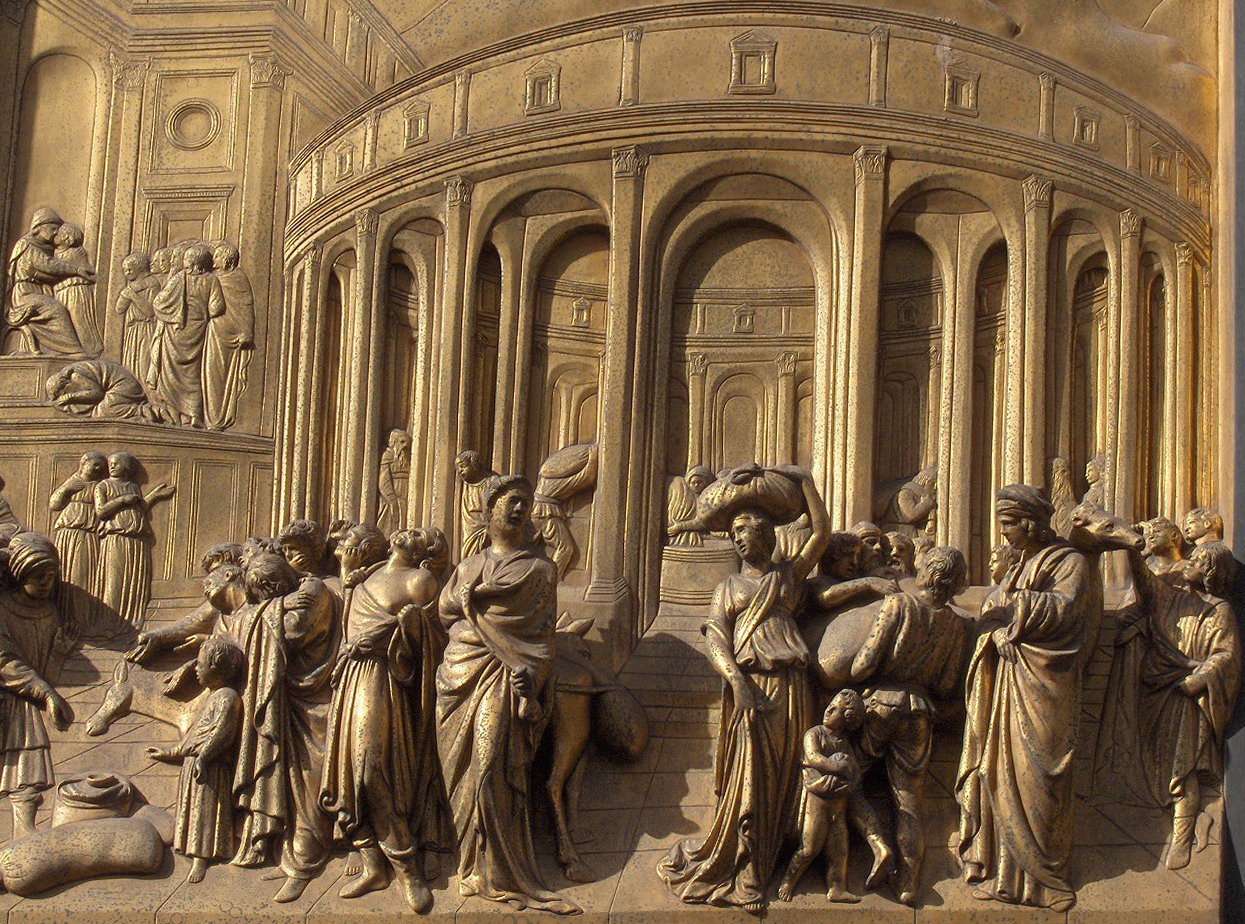

Joseph's father was Jacob, and they lived in Canaan. Joseph was the second youngest of 11 brothers, and his father spent more time with him. Jacob had given Joseph a special multi-colored robe, which his brothers became envious of. Joseph had two dreams he told his brothers about; one where they were all killing him, and the other where they were all bowing to him. They were enraged and were planning on killing him, but they sold him to slavery. Now owned by Egypt (shown at the bottom right), Joseph was imprisoned, and he told people the meaning of their dreams. The Pharaoh sought out Joseph to explain his dream. The Pharaoh told Joseph of his dreams of his city becoming low in food resources. Joseph suggested putting food aside each year for the upcoming low harvest (shown with people having plentiful food).

The Story of Moses (Panel)
Moses was hidden by his birth mother in a basket in the Nile River. The Pharaoh's daughter spotted Moses and took him from the basket (shown on the left with the river and people). Moses became a child of the Pharaoh of Egypt. He was born an Israelite, and his people were enslaved by the people of Egypt. The ten plagues hit Egypt, and people are shown to be frightened (shown by the people on the right). Moses led the Israelites out of Egypt to cross the Red Sea (shown on the right, people rejoicing). Moses received the Ten Commandments from God on Mount Sinai (shown at the top).

The Story of Joshua (Panel)
Moses died. Joshua was now the leader of the Israelites and had to lead them to the Promised Land (shown at the bottom). God's people cross the Jordan River (seen in the middle of a river stream). Joshua carried the ten commandments around the city of Jericho seven times, and the wall collapsed. Joshua and his army then succeeded in taking over the city (shown at the top).

The Story of David (Panel)
Saul was the king of Israel. God said Saul was not the chosen king to lead God's people. Samuel, a prophet, was sent by God to search for a new king. David was brought back to Saul. Saul liked David, so David became his armour bearer and carried his shield. There was a war between Israel and Egypt (shown throughout the photograph). Goliath, an Israeli general, promised that his army would quit if someone could kill him. David was skilled at killing beasts from protecting his sheep as a herdsman. He hit Goliath with a rock and killed him with his own sword (shown at the bottom of the photograph).

The Story of King Solomon (Panel)
King Solomon made an alliance with the Pharaoh king of Egypt and married his daughter (shown in the middle). God granted Solomon any wish. Solomon asked God to become a better leader, and God rewarded him with wisdom. People acknowledged Solomon as a good and wise king (shown with the rejoiceful crowd). Two prostitutes came to the king. They both had a baby, but one of the babies died. Both women swore that the live baby was theirs. King Solomon ordered the baby to be cut in half so they could share the baby. Its mother cried out for mercy on her baby, while the other submitted. Solomon rewarded the one who cried out, since he believed she was truly the mother (shown on the middle left side, behind his wife).

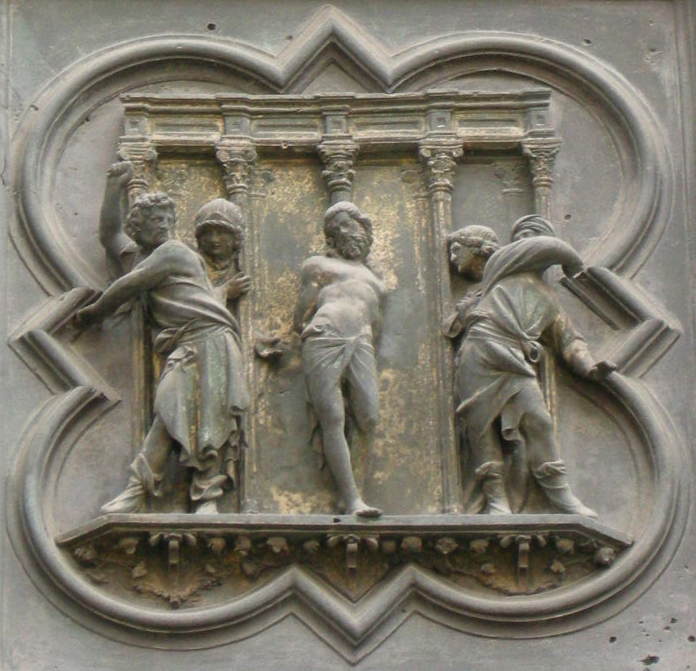
In Flagellation, one of the panels on the North Doors

=== Earlier doors by Andrea Pisano ===
As recommended by Giotto, Andrea Pisano was awarded the commission to design the first set of doors at the Florence Baptistery in 1329. The south doors were originally installed on the east side facing the Duomo, and were transferred to their present location in 1452. These proto-Renaissance doors consist of 28 quatrefoil panels, with the twenty top panels depicting scenes from the life of St. John the Baptist. The eight lower panels depict eight virtues: hope, faith, charity, humility, fortitude, temperance, justice, and prudence. Pisano took six years to complete them, finishing in 1336. In 1453, Ghiberti and his son Vittorio were commissioned to add a door case to Pisano's existing panels. Ghiberti died in 1455, eight years before the frame was finished leaving a majority of the work to Vittorio and other members of his workshop. There is a Latin inscription on top of the door: "Andreas Ugolini Nini de Pisis me fecit A.D. MCCCXXX" (Andrea Pisano made me in 1330). The South Doors were undergoing restoration during September, 2016.

=== 1401 competition ===
In 1401, the Arte di Calimala (Cloth Importers Guild) announced a competition to design doors that eventually would be placed on the north side of the baptistry. The original location for these doors was the east side of the baptistry, but the doors were moved to the north side of the baptistry after Ghiberti completed his second commission, known as the "Gates of Paradise".

These new doors would serve as a votive offering to celebrate Florence being spared from relatively recent scourges such as the Black Death in 1348. Each participant was given four tables of brass and was required to make a relief of the “Sacrifice of Isaac” on a piece of metal that was the size and shape of the door panels. Each artist was given a year to prepare their panel, and the artist who was judged the best was to be given the commission. While many artists competed for this commission the jury selected only seven semifinalists which included Ghiberti, Filippo Brunelleschi, Simone da Colle, Francesco di Val d’Ombrino, Niccolo d’ Arezzo, Jacopo della Quercia da Siena, and Niccolo Lamberti. In 1402 at the time of judging, only Ghiberti and Brunelleschi were finalists, and when the judges could not decide, they were assigned to work together on them. Brunelleschi's pride got in the way, and he went to Rome to study architecture, thereby leaving the then 21-year-old Ghiberti to work on the doors himself. Ghiberti's autobiography, however, claimed that he had won, "without a single dissenting voice." The original designs of The Sacrifice of Isaac by Ghiberti and Brunelleschi are on display in the museum of the Bargello in Florence. Differences between the Sacrifice of Isaac created by Brunelleschi and Ghiberti include the way that the panel was constructed and the overall efficiency of the panel. Brunelleschi's panel consisted of individual pieces of the figures of the artwork being placed onto the bronze framework. In contrast to Brunelleschi's method of creating the artwork on his panel, Ghiberti's casting of the art had all of the figures, with the exception of Isaac, created as one piece. The pieces of the figures themselves were all hollowed out on the inside. Due to the methods by which Ghiberti made the panel, it ended up being stronger, used less bronze, and had less weight than Brunelleschi's panel. By using less bronze, the panels were also more cost-efficient. Including the aspect of the art itself, these differences were included on how the council of the competition decided on the victor.

==== After the competition ====
After the competition, Ghiberti's father, Bartolo, assisted him greatly in perfecting the design of his door before it was cast. This commission brought immediate and lasting recognition to the young artist. In 1403, the formal contract was signed with Bartolo di Michele's workshop, the same workshop he had previously been trained in, and overnight it became the most prestigious in Florence. Four years later, in 1407, Lorenzo legally took over the commission and was prohibited from accepting additional commissions. He devoted much of his time to creating the gates and was paid two hundred florins a year for his work. To cast the doors, Lorenzo worked in a studio named the Aja or Threshing floor. The studio was located near the Hospital of Saint Maria Nuova, the oldest hospital that is still active in Florence today. At the Aja, Ghiberti built a large furnace to melt his metal in an attempt to cast the doors, however his first model was a failure. After this trial, he attempted once more to make a mould. On his second try, he was successful and ended up using 34,000 pounds of bronze, costing a total of 22,000 ducats. This was a large sum in this time period.

It took Ghiberti 21 years to complete the doors. These gilded bronze doors consist of twenty-eight panels, with twenty panels depicting the life of Christ from the New Testament, and on April 19, 1424 they were placed on the side of the Baptistery. Twenty panels showing the life of Christ from the New Testament are depicted: the Annunciation, Nativity, Adoration of the Magi, Dispute with the Doctors, Baptism of Christ, Temptation of Christ, Chasing the Merchants Away, Christ Walking on Water, Transfiguration, Resurrection of Lazarus, Christ’s Arrival in Jerusalem, Last Supper, Agony in the Garden, Christ Being Captured, Flagellation, Christ on Trial with Pilate, Trip to Calvary, Crucifixion, Resurrection, and Pentecost. The eight lower panels show the four evangelists and the Church Fathers: Saint Ambrose, Saint Jerome, Saint Gregory and Saint Augustine. The panels are surrounded by a framework of foliage in the door case and gilded busts of prophets and sibyls at the intersections of the panels. Originally installed on the east side in place of Pisano's doors, they were later moved to the north side. They are described by the art historian Antonio Paolucci as "the most important event in the history of Florentine art in the first quarter of the fifteenth century".

The bronze statues over the northern gate depict John the Baptist preaching to a Pharisee and Sadducee and were sculpted by Francesco Rustici. Rustici may have been aided in his design by Leonardo da Vinci, who assisted him in the choice of his tools.

==== After completion of the doors ====
After the completion of these doors, Ghiberti was widely recognized as a celebrity and the top artist in this field. He was given many commissions, including some from the pope. In 1425, he got a second commission for the Florence Baptistery, this time for the east doors, on which he and his workshop (including Michelozzo and Benozzo Gozzoli) toiled for 27 years, excelling themselves. The subjects of the designs for the doors were chosen by Leonardo Bruni d'Arezzo, then chancellor of the Republic of Florence. They have ten panels depicting scenes from the Old Testament, and were in turn installed on the east side. The panels are large rectangles and are no longer embedded in the traditional Gothic quatrefoil, as in the previous doors. Ghiberti employed the recently discovered principles of perspective to give depth to his compositions. Each panel depicts more than one episode. "The Story of Joseph" portrays the narrative scheme of Joseph Cast by His Brethren into the Well, Joseph Sold to the Merchants, The merchants delivering Joseph to the pharaoh, Joseph Interpreting the Pharaoh's dream, The Pharaoh Paying him Honour, Jacob Sends His Sons to Egypt and Joseph Recognizes His Brothers and Returns Home. According to Vasari's Lives, this panel was the most difficult and also the most beautiful. The figures are distributed in very low relief in a perspective space (a technique invented by Donatello and called rilievo schiacciato, which literally means "flattened relief"). Ghiberti uses different sculptural techniques, from incised lines to almost free-standing figure sculpture within the panels, further accentuating the sense of space.

The panels are included in a richly decorated gilt framework of foliage and fruit, with many statuettes of prophets and 24 busts. The two central busts are portraits of the artist and of his father, Bartolomeo Ghiberti.

The Annunciation panel portrays the scene with an angel dressed in a robe, wings, and a trumpet appearing to Mary, who is shown in an expression of shock, leaving a doorway. The Nativity panel depicts the birth of Christ with an ox, a donkey, Joseph and Mary, an angel, and the shepherds. All the characters in the panel are all depicted near a cave, while all but Mary are showing reverence towards her. The Adoration of the Magi panel shows the three magi giving praise to Christ and Mary, with Joseph and angels in the background. In the Christ Among the Doctors panel, Christ is depicted as a child sitting upon a throne-like chair surrounded by the doctors in discussion with him. The narrative of the doctors being shocked of how intelligently Christ spoke is demonstrated by how all the doctors are speaking to each other in intense discussion around Christ. The Baptism of Christ panel, Christ is shown surrounded by spectators, a dove, and his cousin, John the Baptist, being baptized in a river. The background includes intensely detailed trees with leaves, rocks, and a flowing river. The Temptation of Christ panel is shown with Christ surrounded by angels while facing the fallen angel, Satan, standing upon rocks. Satan is depicted as a human with bat-like wings and robes. The Chasing the Merchants Away panel depicts the scene with Christ pushing away a group of merchants with his fists raised inside the temple. The temple in the background is depicted by columns and arches with complex designs; the merchants are also shown holding goods while being pushed away. The Christ Walking on Water panel displays Jesus standing on water and the disciples at sea while Peter is drowning. The panel shows a ship detailed with sails, shown to have the individual ropes from the mast as well as the ship itself having artistic designs. The ocean is also detailed with the waves flowing, and where Jesus stands on the water, it bends down to show him standing on it. The Transfiguration panel shows Jesus standing with the prophets Moses and Elijah over his disciples Peter, James, and John. The awe of the three disciples is expressed by them being on the ground and looking away from Christ and the prophets. The Raising of Lazarus panel shows Lazarus leaving his tomb being surrounded by Christ, his sisters, and disciples. The awe of the sisters of Lazarus is shown by one of them on the ground, and the other is grabbing Lazarus while kneeling. The Entry into Jerusalem panel shows Christ riding upon a donkey, being greeted by a large crowd with the gates of Jerusalem in the background. Each individual in the crowd has a distinct face with different hairstyles and clothes. The Last Supper panel shows the well-known scene in the New Testament of Christ eating with the twelve disciples. The background is decorated with grapes on the columns and drapes in the background, while Christ is at the head of the table, and the disciples are sitting in unison. The Agony in the Garden panel shows Christ praying towards an angle and disciples sleeping behind him. The imagery of the garden is highly detailed with bushes, rocks, and trees. The Christ Being Captured panel shows Christ being marked by Judas to be arrested by the Roman soldiers while disciples are struggling against the soldiers. The soldiers each have individualized armour and weapons, such as a spear, axe, and sword. The Flagellation panel depicts Jesus being flogged by the Roman soldiers holding rods in a swinging motion. The Crucifixion panel of the North Doors depicts the scene with Mary and John at the foot of the cross, mourning with angels next to Christ hanging. Mary is shown to be in mourning, with her looking down away from the cross. Although the overall quality of the casting is considered exquisite, there are some known mistakes. For example, in panel 15 of the North Doors (Flagellation) the casting of the second column in the front row has been overlaid over an arm, so that one of the flagellators appears trapped in stone, with his hand sticking out of it.

Michelangelo referred to these doors as fit to be the "Gates of Paradise" (It. Porte del Paradiso), and they are still invariably referred to by this name. Giorgio Vasari described them a century later as "undeniably perfect in every way and must rank as the finest masterpiece ever created". Ghiberti himself said they were "the most singular work that I have ever made".

In 2007, the Metropolitan Museum of Art exhibited The Gates of Paradise: Lorenzo Ghiberti's Renaissance Masterpiece, an exhibition of “three of the doors' famous narrative reliefs, with their masterful retelling of Old Testament subjects, as well as four figural sections from their opulent surrounding frames, before they are permanently installed in the Museo dell'Opera del Duomo.”

== The bronze statues for Orsanmichele ==
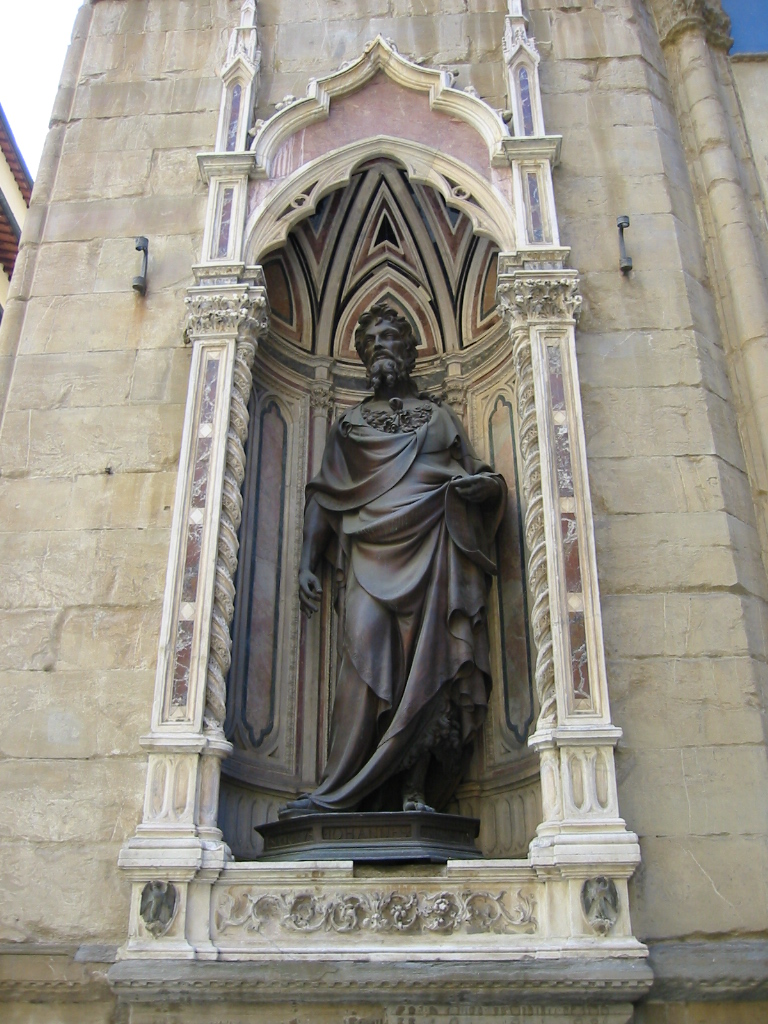
St. John the Baptist

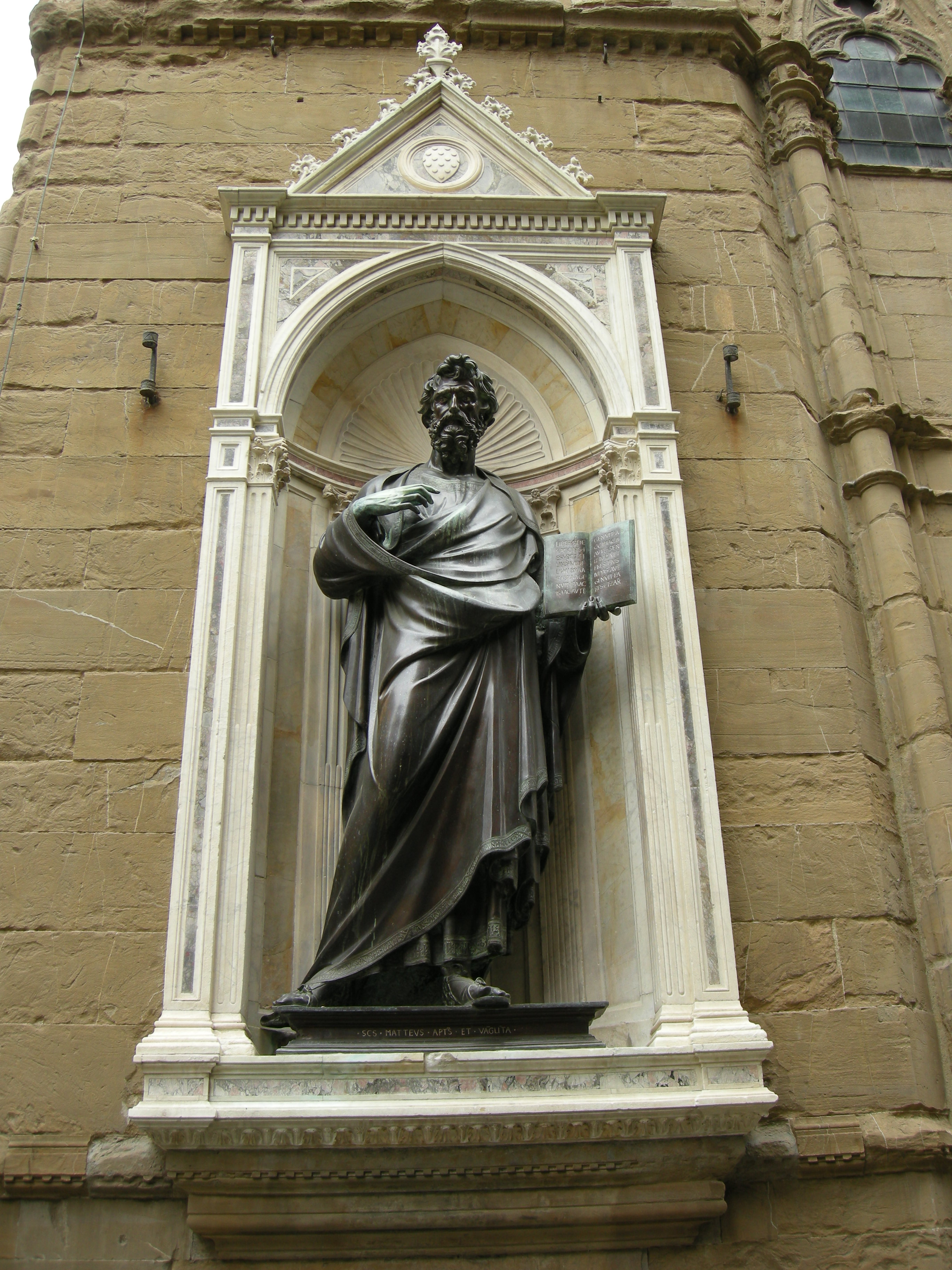
St. Matthew

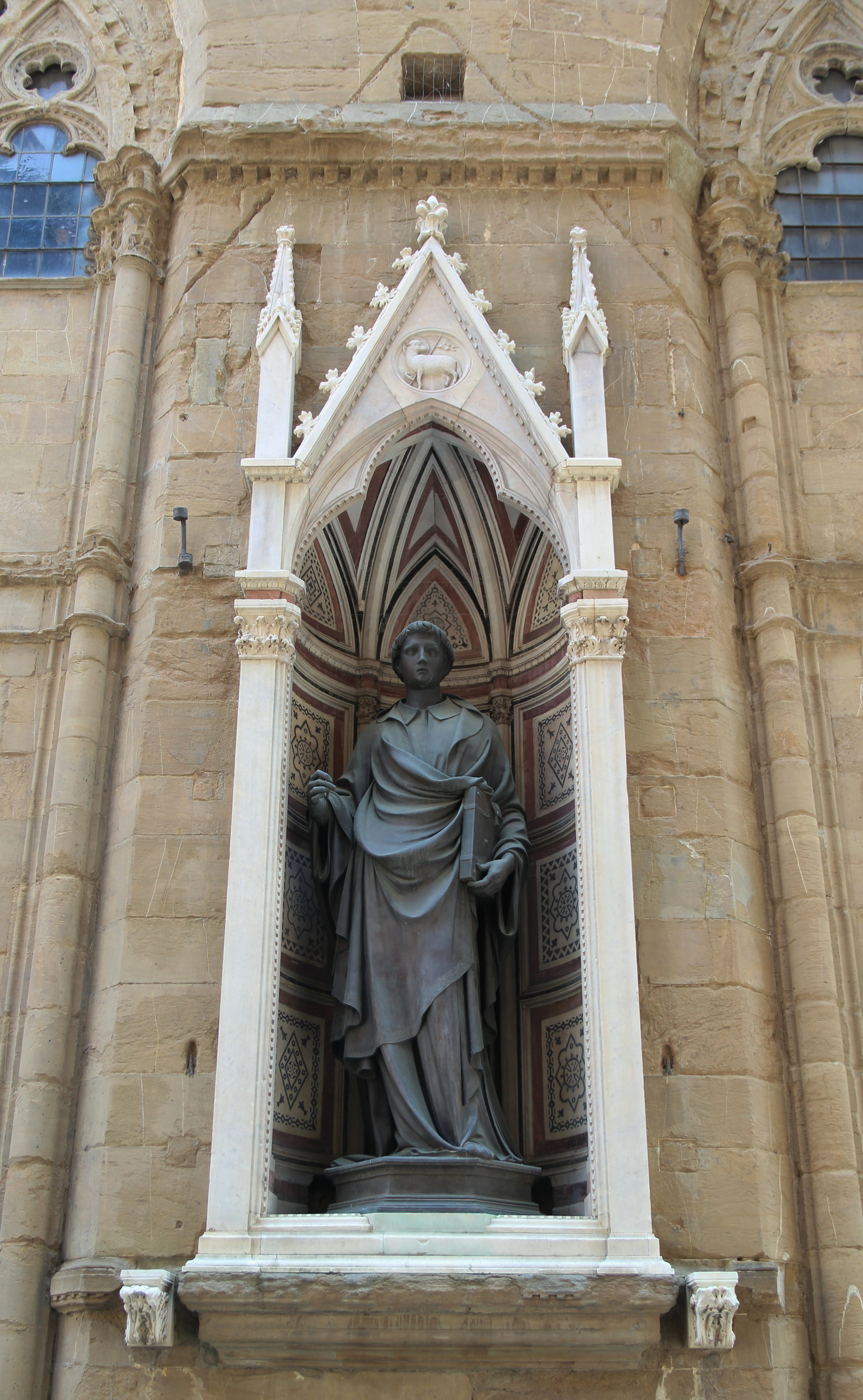
St. Stephen

=== St. John the Baptist ===
The St. John the Baptist statue sits in a niche of the Orsanmichele in Florence, which was built from 1412–-1416. This statue is based on the St. John the Baptist. Ghiberti's masterpiece was commissioned by the Arte di Calimala guild, which was the wool merchants' guild. They were one of the wealthiest in Florence. This statue was a technological advance for its time. Ghiberti had incredible casting skill to be able to bond this 8’ 4” statue made of bronze. Ghiberti's statue was influenced by the Gothic style in Italy, shown by the elegant curves of the drapery.

=== St. Matthew ===
This statue was commissioned by the Arte del Cambio, the bankers' guild and executed by Ghiberti between 1419 and 1423. The Saint Matthew statue reaches a height of 8’ 10” of bronze. It is also located in a niche in the Orsanmichele in Florence. The guild specified they wanted their statue to be as tall as or taller than the St. John the Baptist statue.

=== St. Stephen ===
He constructed a statue of St. Stephen for the Arte della Lana (Wool Manufacturers' Guild).

== Later life, family, and death ==
By 1417 Lorenzo Ghiberti was married to Marsila, the 16- year-old daughter of Bartolommeo di Lucca, a worthy comb-maker. Together they had two sons. In 1417, they had Tommaso Ghiberti, and a year later they had Vittorio Ghiberti. Ghiberti was wealthier than most of his contemporary artists, with his success bringing him great financial rewards. A surviving tax return of 1427 shows he owned a considerable amount of land both in Florence and outside the city. He also had a substantial amount of money invested in government bonds to his credit. Over the years, his real estate and monetary holdings continued to grow. While in Florence, Ghiberti, aged seventy-five, succumbed to a fever of unknown cause and was buried in the Basilica di Santa Croce on December 1, 1455.

Vittorio followed in his father's footsteps as a goldsmith and bronze-caster, but never rose to great fame. Later, he had a son whom he named Buonaccorso, who followed the (grand)paternal art. However, Buonaccorso had a different spin on his grandfather's work, with his metal castings taking the form of artillery and cannonballs. His manufacture of these weapons made him famous, mainly for supplying the wars of Sarzana and Pisa. Vittorio shares the burial spot in the Santa Croce with his father. Their gravestone mentions them both, with its inscription honouring Lorenzo's Battistero doors design, and Vittorio's ornamental work on Andrea da Pisa's doors (in addition to 'being a very worthy aid' to his father).

Tommaso did join his father's business, helping as a collaborator with Lorenzo's assistants. After his father's death, it is unknown if he continued in the business, as he is not mentioned in any of the documents after 1447.

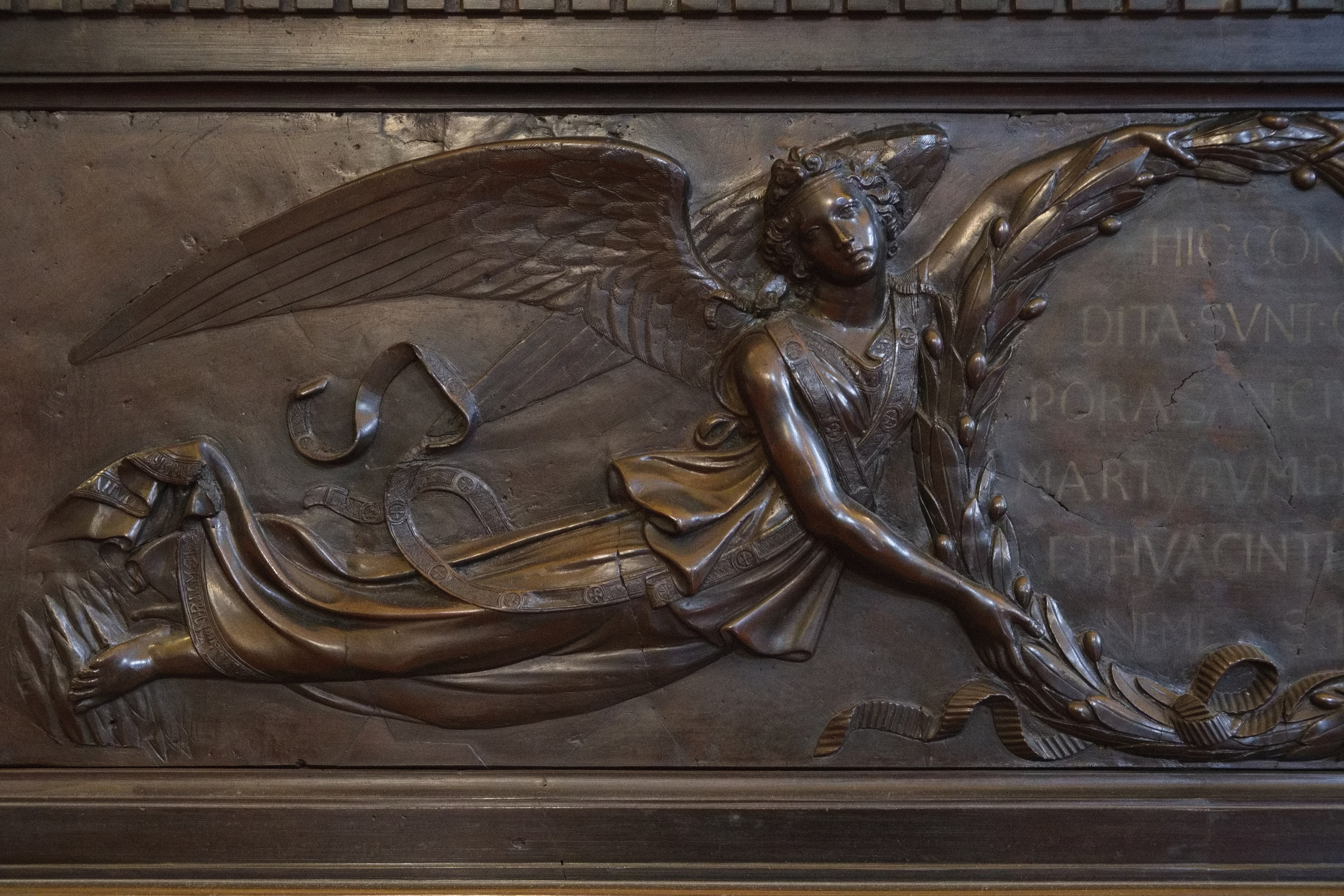
Detail of the Reliquary Shrine of SS Protus, Hyacinth and Nemesius, 1428, Bargello, Florence

== Other works ==
He was also a collector of classical artefacts and a historian. He was actively involved in the spreading of humanist ideas. His unfinished Commentarii are a valuable source of information about Renaissance art and contain what is considered the first autobiography of an artist. This work was a major source for Vasari's Vite.

Ghiberti's "Commentario" includes the earliest known surviving autobiography of an artist. He discusses the development of art from the time of Cimabue through to his own work. In describing his second bronze portal for the Florence Baptistry, he states: "In this work I sought to imitate nature as closely as possible, both in proportions and in perspective... the buildings appear as seen by the eye of one who gazes on them from a distance." The language Ghiberti used to describe his art has proved invaluable to art historians in understanding the aims Renaissance artists were striving for in their artworks.

Paolo Uccello, who was commonly regarded as the first great master of perspective, worked in Ghiberti's workshop for several years, making it difficult to determine the extent to which Uccello's innovations in perspective were due to Ghiberti's instruction. Donatello, known for one of the first examples of central-point perspective in sculpture, also worked briefly in Ghiberti's workshop. It was also about this time that Paolo began his lifelong friendship with Donatello. In about 1413, one of Ghiberti's contemporaries, Filippo Brunelleschi, demonstrated the geometrical method of perspective used today by artists by painting the outlines of various Florentine buildings onto a mirror. When the building's outline was continued, he noticed that all of the lines converged on the horizon line.

Recent scholarship indicates that in his work on perspective, Ghiberti was influenced by the Arab polymath Alhazen, who had written about the optical basis of perspective in the early eleventh century. His Book of Optics was translated into Italian in the fourteenth century as Deli Aspecti, and was quoted at length in Ghiberti's "Commentario terzo." Author A. Mark Smith suggests that, through Ghiberti, Alhazen's Book of Optics "may well have been central to the development of artificial perspective in early Renaissance Italian painting."

== Gallery ==
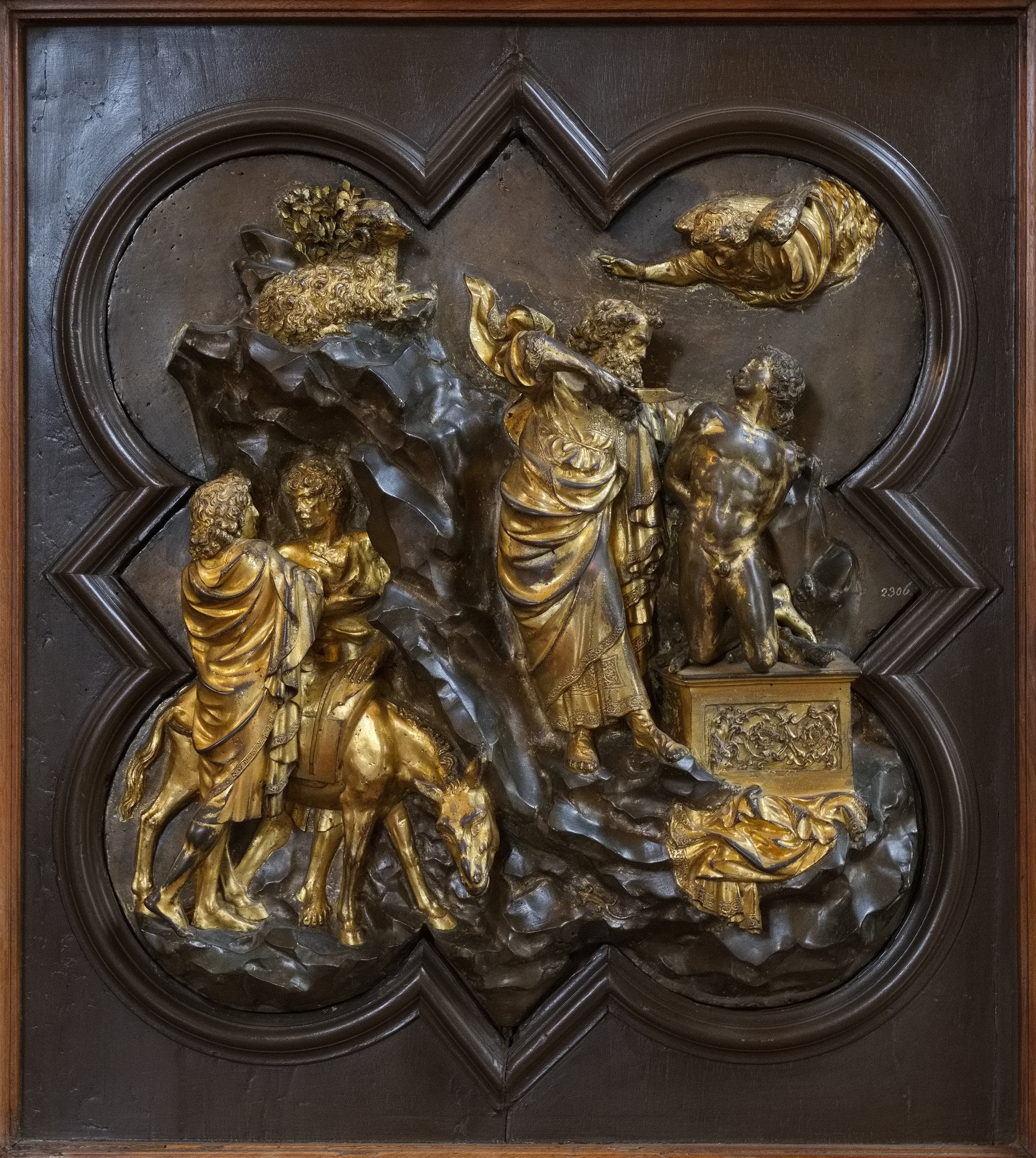
The Sacrifice of Isaac, Ghiberti's competition piece of 1401

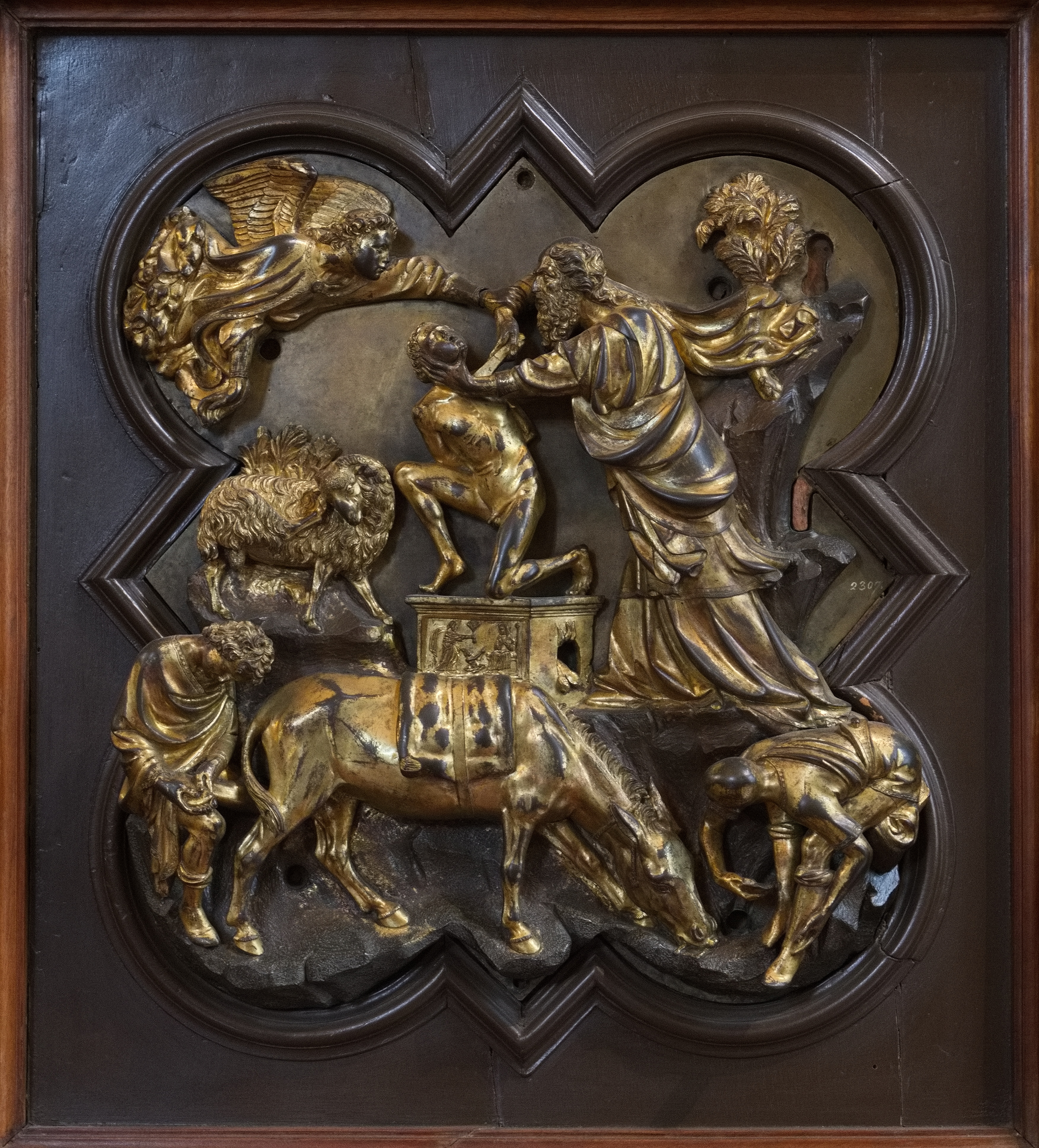
The Sacrifice of Isaac, Brunelleschi's competition piece of 1401

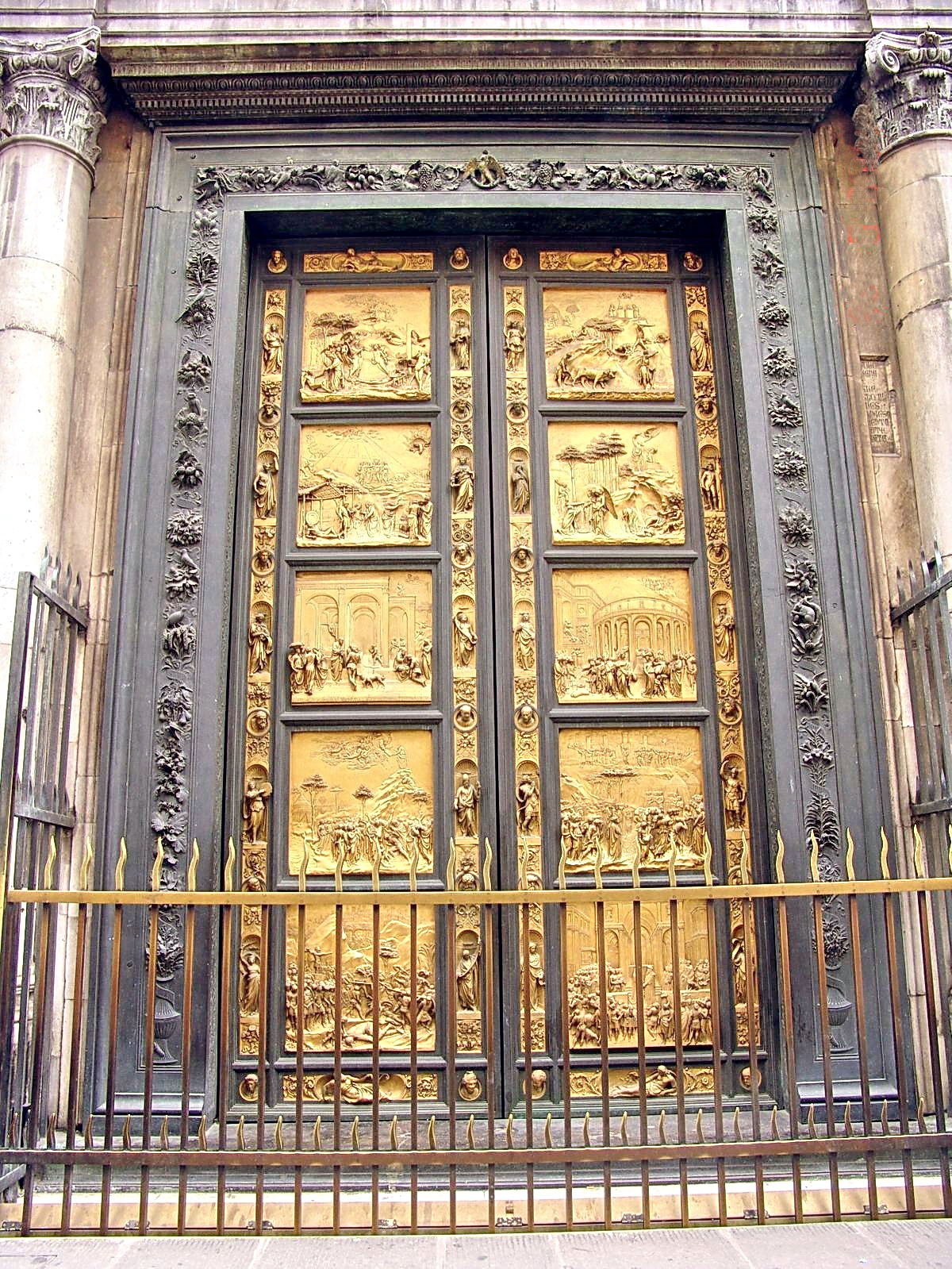
Gates of Paradise, Baptistery, Florence, the doors in situ are reproductions

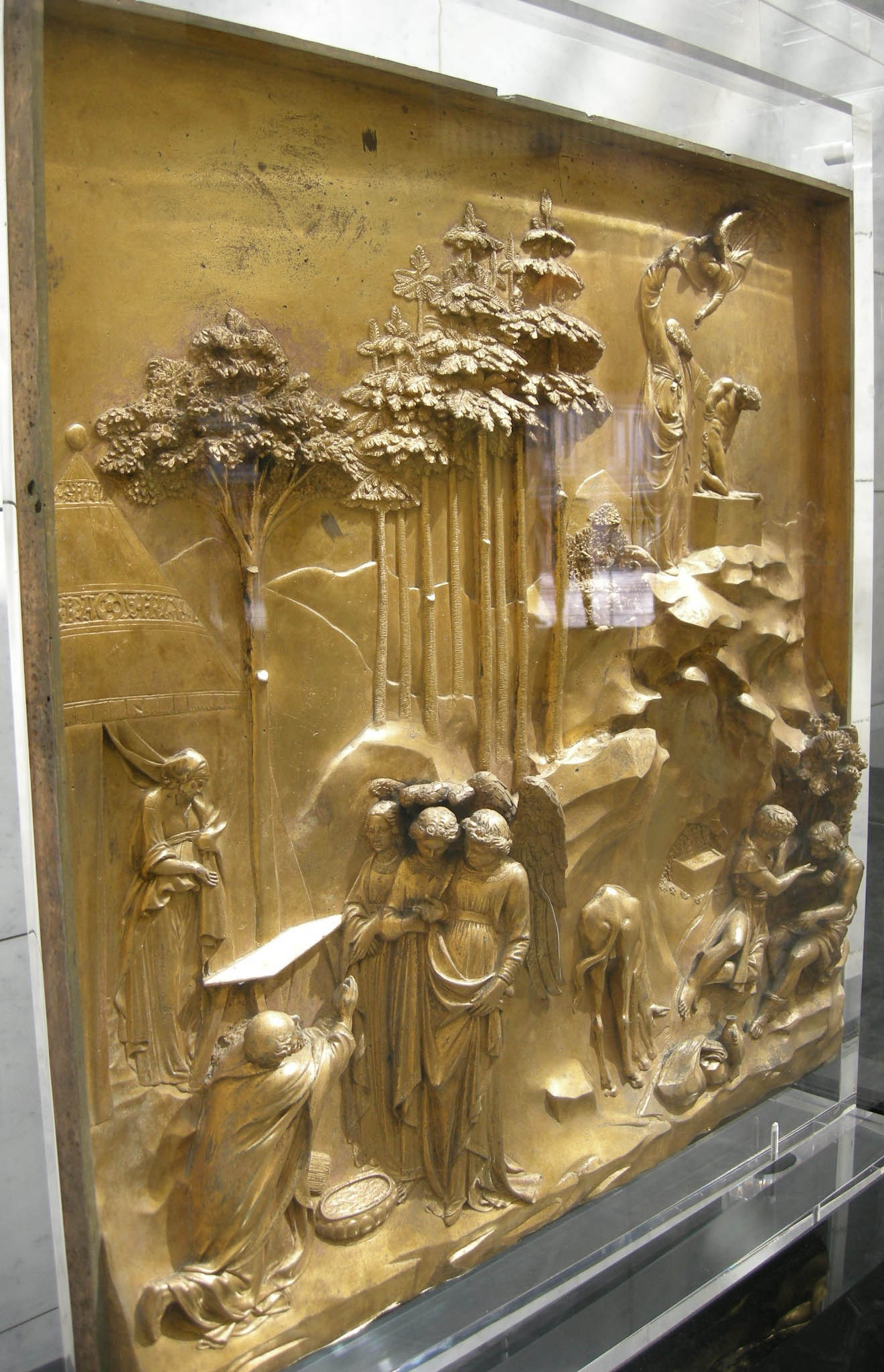
Angled view of a panel with the story of Abraham from the Florence Gates of Paradise (see above)

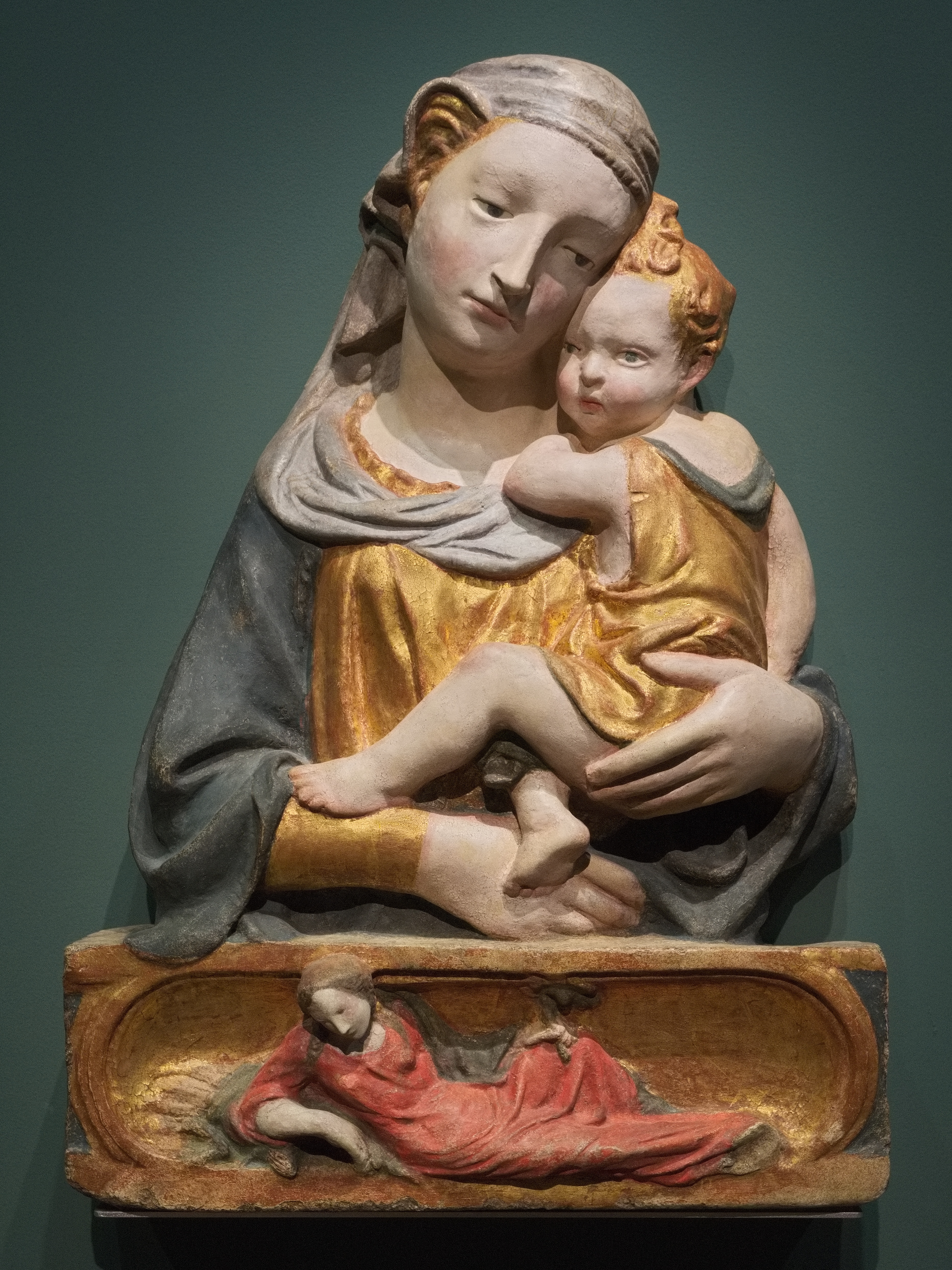
Virgin and Child and Reclyning Eve, the latter recurring as Maria in the Nativity on the North door, by Ghiberti or after him, 1430s, Bode Museum, Berlin

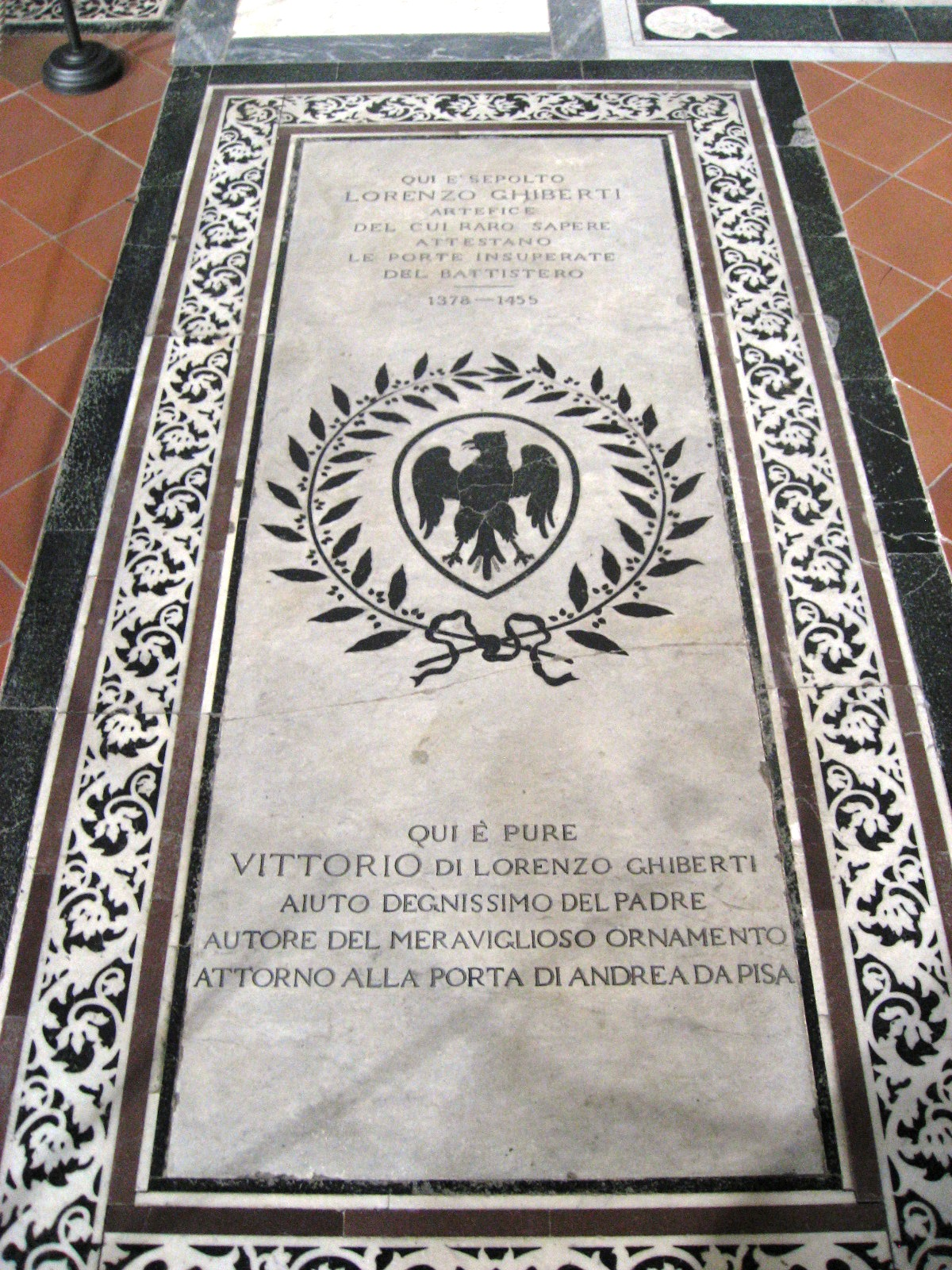
Tomb of Ghiberti in the Basilica of Santa Croce in Florence
