= 2005–06 Udinese Calcio season =

Udinese Calcio
2005–06 season
- President: Giampaolo Pozzo
- Manager: Serse Cosmi (until 10 February 2006); Néstor Sensini (interim manager); Loris Dominissini (until 20 March 2006); Giovanni Galeone
- Stadium: Stadio Friuli
- Serie A: 11th
- Coppa Italia: Semi-finals
- UEFA Cup: Round of 16
- Top goalscorer: Vincenzo Iaquinta (9) and Antonio Di Natale (9)
Home colours	Away colours	Third colours

During the 2005–06 Italian football season, Udinese Calcio competed in Serie A, Champions League and the UEFA Cup. In the latter, they were knocked out by Levski Sofia in the Round of 16. The team reached the semi-finals of Coppa Italia, where they were knocked out by Internazionale. The fixture had been moved from its original schedule. In the Champions League, the club finished third in Group C, which meant a transfer to UEFA Cup. Their final game in the group stage on 7 December 2005 was a 2–0 defeat against Barcelona. They tied with Werder Bremen with 7 points in total, but were eliminated due to a worse goal difference (−2).

== Competitions ==
=== Serie A ===
Pos	Team	Pld	W	D	L	GF	GA	GD	Pts
9	Fiorentina (Note: Milan, Fiorentina and Lazio were docked 30 points, all for involvement in the Calciopoli.)	38	22	8	8	66	41	+25	44
10	Ascoli	38	9	16	13	43	53	−10	43
11	Udinese	38	11	10	17	40	54	−14	43
12	Sampdoria	38	10	11	17	47	51	−4	41
13	Reggina	38	11	8	19	39	65	−26	41

Source: 2005–06 Serie A, Soccerway
Rules for classification: 1) points; 2) goal difference; 3) number of goals scored.

== First-team squad ==
Note: Flags indicate national team as defined under FIFA eligibility rules; some limited exceptions apply. Players may hold more than one non-FIFA nationality.

No.	Pos.	Nation	Player
1	GK	ITA	Morgan De Sanctis
3	DF	ITA	Michele Rinaldi
4	DF	ITA	Valerio Bertotto
5	MF	NGA	Christian Obodo
6	DF	ARG	Nestor Sensini
7	MF	ITA	Damiano Zenoni
8	MF	POR	José Luís Vidigal
9	FW	ITA	Vincenzo Iaquinta
10	FW	ITA	Antonio Di Natale
11	FW	LBY	Al-Saadi Gaddafi
12	GK	ITA	Gabriele Paoletti
13	NF	ITA	Giampiero Pinzi

No.	Pos.	Nation	Player
14	DF	ITA	Cesare Natali
18	MF	GHA	Sulley Muntari
19	DF	BRA	Felipe
22	DF	ITA	Massimo Gotti
25	DF	ITA	Piermario Morosini
26	MF	ITA	Mirko Pieri
27	MF	ITA	Marco Motta
31	FW	BRA	Barreto
32	DF	FRA	Vincent Candela
33	MF	ITA	Flavio Lazzari
39	DF	BRA	Juarez
58	GK	ITA	Carlo Sciarrone
