= Emanuele Manitta =

Italian footballer (born 1977)

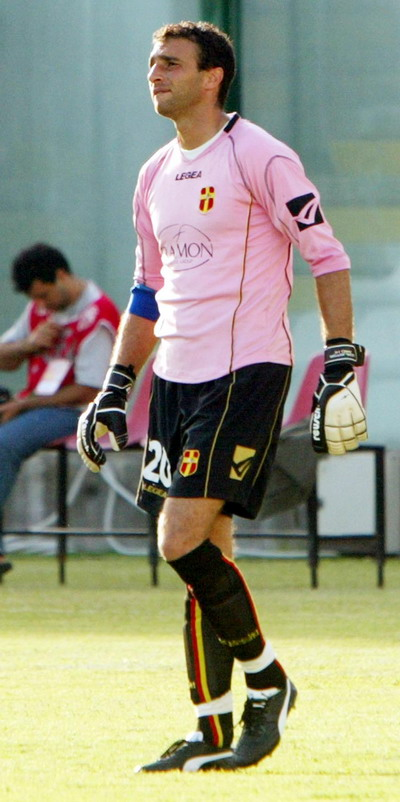
- Manitta in 2007

Personal information
- Date of birth: 12 January 1977 (age 49)
- Place of birth: Caltagirone, Italy
- Height: 1.88 m (6 ft 2 in)
- Position: Goalkeeper

Youth career
- 1994–1995: Bari

Senior career*
Years	Team	Apps	(Gls)
1995–1996	Ragusa	12	(0)
1996–1997	Peloro	30	(0)
1997–2003	Messina	140	(0)
2000–2001	→ Lecce (loan)	0	(0)
2003	→ Napoli (loan)	8	(0)
2003–2004	Napoli	41	(0)
2004–2005	Catanzaro	16	(0)
2005–2006	Bologna	2	(0)
2006–2007	Livorno	8	(0)
2007–2008	Messina	30	(0)
2008–2009	Siena	6	(0)
- * Club domestic league appearances and goals

Emanuele Manitta (born 12 January 1977) is a retired Italian football goalkeeper.

== Football career ==
=== Early career ===
A native of Caltagirone, Sicily, he spent one season at youth rank of A.S. Bari before to move to Sicilian amateur club U.S. Ragusa, at that time at Serie D. He then moved to Peloro Calcio of Serie D. In summer 1997, Peloro merged with Messina, at that time at Serie D.

=== Messina ===
At Messina, he helped the club gain promotion to Serie C2 in summer 1998, and to Serie C1 in summer 2000.

He won a loan contract from U.S. Lecce in summer 2000, but did not play.

He returned to Messina in summer 2001, this time at Serie B.

He won another loan contract from S.S.C. Napoli (Serie B) in January 2003, to replace Marco Storari, later the move became permanent. He played 41 out of 42 Serie B games that season.

But Napoli faced bankrupt in summer 2004, he started his career that finding a club in every summer.

=== Later career ===
He was first for Catanzaro (Serie B), but the club almost failed to protect her place on Serie B. He then joined Bologna as backup of Gianluca Pagliuca in Serie B, where he just made 2 appearances.

In summer 2006, he joined Livorno, where he made his Serie A debut on 21 January 2007 in a 1–1 draw against A.S. Roma. As a backup for Marco Amelia, he also played 8 Serie A games, but none in the 2006–07 UEFA Cup.

In summer 2007, he moved back to Messina, ahead Gabriele Paoletti as first choice, where he played 30 Serie B games. Following the disbandment of the Sicilian club, he was released for free in July 2008, and later signed by Siena on 3 October 2008 as an emergency replacement for Dimitrios Eleftheropoulos.

== Honours ==
Messina

- Serie D: 1997–98
- Serie C2: 1999–2000
