= Gabriele Paoletti =

Italian footballer

Personal information
- Date of birth: 11 April 1978 (age 48)
- Place of birth: Rome, Italy
- Height: 6 ft 3 in (1.91 m)
- Position: Goalkeeper

Senior career*
Years	Team	Apps	(Gls)
1997–2002	Torino	0	(0)
1998–2000	→ Modena (loan)	30	(0)
2000–2001	→ L'Aquila (loan)	33	(0)
2002–2004	Roma	0	(0)
2002–2003	→ Lanciano (loan)	20	(0)
2003–2004	→ Viterbese (loan)	32	(0)
2004–2005	Reggiana	33	(0)
2005–2006	Udinese	6	(0)
2007–2008	Messina	12	(0)
2008–2009	Arezzo	15	(0)
Total		181	(0)
- * Club domestic league appearances and goals

Gabriele Paoletti (born 11 April 1978) is a retired Italian football goalkeeper.

== Career ==
In the summer of 2002, Paoletti was exchanged for Alberto Maria Fontana. In summer 2004, he joined Reggiana in co-ownership deal, for €0.5K. He also played in the Italian Serie A as backup keeper for Udinese and Messina. In July 2005, he was signed by Udinese to provide extra cover for Morgan De Sanctis. In January 2007, he was signed by Messina as a replacement goalkeeper following the departure of Marco Storari. In the next season, he became backup of Emanuele Manitta.

Following Messina's bankruptcy, he was signed by Arezzo in November 2008.

== Career statistics ==
Appearances and goals by club, season and competition
Club	Season	League			National cup		Europe		Other		Total	
Club	Season	Division	Apps	Goals	Apps	Goals	Apps	Goals	Apps	Goals	Apps	Goals
Torino	2001–02	Serie A	0	0	0	0	—		—		0	0
Modena (loan)	1999–2000	Serie C1	30	0	—		—		—		30	0
L'Aquila (loan)	2000–01	Serie C1	33	0	—		—		—		33	0
Lanciano (loan)	2002–03	Serie C1	20	0	0	0	—		—		20	0
Viterbese (loan)	2003–04	Serie C1	32	0	—		—		4	0	36	0
Reggiana	2004–05	Serie C1	33	0	—		—		2	0	35	0
Udinese	2005–06	Serie A	4	0	3	0	0	0	—		7	0
Udinese	2006–07	Serie A	2	0	0	0	—		—		2	0
Udinese	Total		6	0	3	0	0	0	—		9	0
Messina	2006–07	Serie A	11	0	—		—		—		11	0
Messina	2007–08	Serie B	1	0	1	0	—		—		2	0
Messina	Total		12	0	1	0	—		—		13	0
Arezzo	2008–09	Lega Pro 1	15	0	—		—		2	0	17	0
Career total			181	0	4	0	0	0	8	0	193	0
