= Ilario Lamberti =

Italian footballer

Personal information
- Full name: Ilario Davide Lamberti
- Date of birth: 7 February 1988 (age 38)
- Place of birth: Crotone, Italy
- Height: 1.88 m (6 ft 2 in)
- Position: Goalkeeper

Team information
- Current team: Isola Capo Rizzuto

Youth career
- ?–2006: Crotone

Senior career*
Years	Team	Apps	(Gls)
2006–2007	Grottaglie	33	(0)
2007–2008	Martina	0	(0)
2007–2008	→ Udinese (loan)	0	(0)
2008–2009	Sapri	14	(0)
2009–2011	Bari	0	(0)
2010–2011	→ Valenzana (loan)	4	(0)
2011–2012	Bari	0	(0)
- * Club domestic league appearances and goals

Ilario Davide Lamberti (born 7 February 1988) is an Italian footballer.

== Biography ==
Born in Crotone, Calabria, Lamberti started his senior career at Serie D (amateur) team Grottaglie. He moved to Martina in 2007 but signed by Udinese in August, in exchanged with Marco Murriero. After 1 season in Primavera team, he left for another Serie D team Sapri.

=== Bari ===
On 5 June 2009, he was presented as a new player of Bari. He joined the team in free transfer, signing a 3-year deal. Lamberti was the third keeper of the team, behind Belgian Jean-François Gillet and former Liverpool player Daniele Padelli. He wore no.12 shirt for the first team but only played in friendlies and in Primavera team as overage player.

On 1 August 2010, he became a new player of Valenzana. He made his professional league debut on 31 October 2010, winning Casale 2–1. He played his first official game for the club on 15 August, replacing Alberto Frigerio who was sent off. The cup match Valenzana lost to Pro Vercelli 0–2. Due to Frigerio's suspension, he also played the next match on 18 August. The last match of the cup's group stage, was also played by Lamberti. After the arrival of Marco Serena in January 2011, he became the third keeper, and youth keeper Andrea Sperandio became the fourth.

== Honours ==
- Coppa Italia Serie D: 2009
