= Carlo Sciarrone =

Italian footballer (born 1983)

Personal information
- Date of birth: 17 November 1983 (age 42)
- Place of birth: Genoa, Italy
- Height: 1.91 m (6 ft 3 in)
- Position: Goalkeeper

Youth career
- 2002–2003: Viterbese

Senior career*
Years	Team	Apps	(Gls)
2003–2005	Chieti	18	(0)
2005–2007	Udinese	0	(0)
2007–2008	Massese	26	(0)
2008–2010	Gallipoli	22	(0)
- * Club domestic league appearances and goals

Carlo Sciarrone (born 17 November 1983) is an Italian footballer who plays as a goalkeeper.

== Career ==
In July 2005, Sciarrone was signed by Udinese, serving as the club's third-choice goalkeeper behind Morgan De Sanctis and Gabriele Paoletti. In summer 2007, he left for Massese in a co-ownership deal. The following season, he was signed by Gallipoli. He played twice throughout the season for the eventual Prima Divisione champions, behind Generoso Rossi. In the next season, he shared the first choice goalkeeping spot with Jan Koprivec and was backed by Simone Palese who played in a 6–0 away defeat in the 2009–10 Coppa Italia.

== Honours ==
Gallipoli

- Lega Pro Prima Divisione: 2009
