= Morgan De Sanctis =

Italian former professional footballer

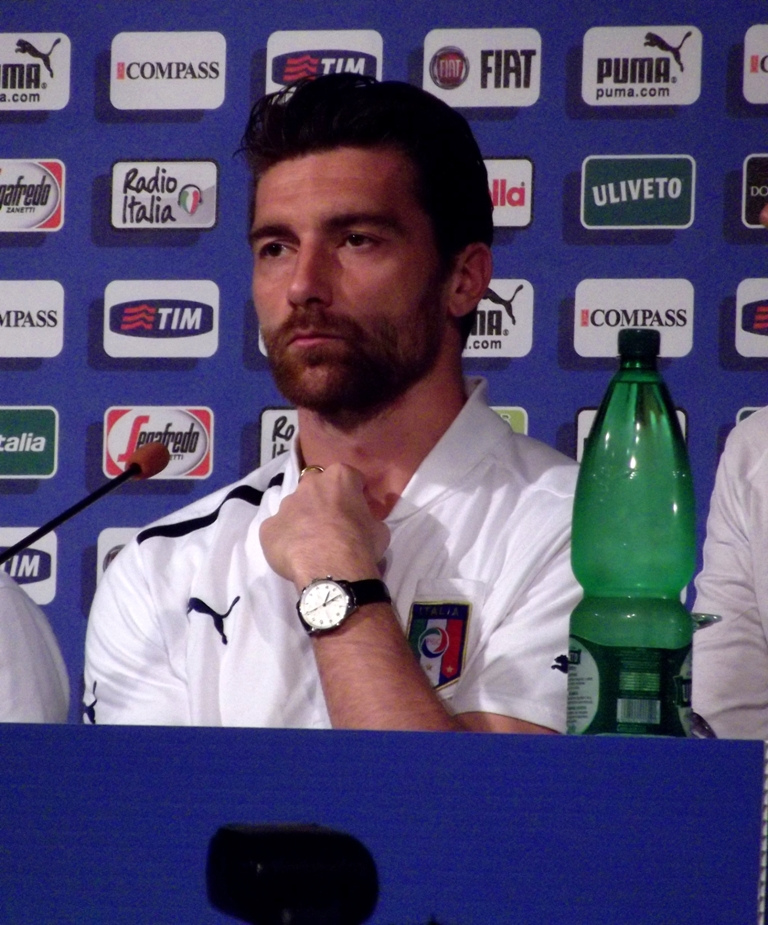
- De Sanctis pictured in 2012

Personal information
- Full name: Morgan De Sanctis
- Date of birth: 26 March 1977 (age 49)
- Place of birth: Guardiagrele, Italy
- Height: 1.90 m (6 ft 3 in)
- Position: Goalkeeper

Youth career
- Pescara

Senior career*
Years	Team	Apps	(Gls)
1994–1997	Pescara	74	(0)
1997–1999	Juventus	3	(0)
1999–2007	Udinese	194	(0)
2007–2009	Sevilla	8	(0)
2008–2009	→ Galatasaray (loan)	31	(0)
2009–2013	Napoli	147	(0)
2013–2016	Roma	71	(0)
2016–2017	Monaco	1	(0)
Total		529	(0)

International career
1994–1995	Italy U18	8	(0)
1999–2000	Italy U21	7	(0)
2005–2012	Italy	6	(0)
Medal record
Men's Football
Representing Italy
UEFA European Championship
Runner-up	2012 Poland–Ukraine
- * Club domestic league appearances and goals

Morgan De Sanctis (Italian pronunciation: [ˈmɔrɡan de ˈsaŋktis]; born 26 March 1977) is an Italian former professional footballer who played as a goalkeeper.

De Sanctis played for several Italian clubs throughout his career; he began his career with Pescara, and later also played for Juventus, Udinese, Napoli, and Roma; he also had spells in Spain and Turkey with Sevilla and Galatasaray respectively. He ended his playing career in France after a season with Monaco in 2017.

At international level, he has represented the Italy national team and was included in squads for the 2000 Summer Olympics, UEFA Euro 2008, the 2009 FIFA Confederations Cup, the 2010 FIFA World Cup and UEFA Euro 2012.

== Club career ==
=== Early career ===
After a three-year stint with Serie B side Pescara, De Sanctis became a reserve player for the Serie A giants Juventus, playing only three times in two seasons before joining Udinese in 1999 in a co-ownership deal along with Marco Zamboni, for 2.5 billion Lire (€1,291,142.25) each. In May 2000, the deal became permanent, for 8 billion lire (€4,131,655), as part of the deal that Juventus signed Marco Zanchi.

=== Udinese ===
After three seasons as a backup for Luigi Turci, he finally managed to start in the 2002–03 season. His contract was renewed on 10 November 2000, 18 October 2003 and 20 September 2005, which his annual gross salary increased from €569,000 (€310,000 net) in 2003 to €623,000 (€350,000 net) in 2005, plus other bonuses, including a loyalty bonus since 2005, for €350,878 a season (€200,000 net). He played all 6 group stage matches of the 2005–06 UEFA Champions League, and reached round of 16 of the 2005–06 UEFA Cup.

=== Sevilla ===
On 8 June 2007, he unilaterally terminated his contract with Udinese by misusing Webster ruling. He signed a four-year contract with Sevilla FC, worth €1,381,578.94 a season (€1.05 million in net). Udinese submitted the case to the FIFA Dispute Resolution Chamber as Udinese and De Sanctis failed to agree on the compensation. On 10 December 2009, the DRC awarded Udinese liable to receive €3,933,134 from De Sanctis, quoting Matuzalém's case as legal reference. The case then appealed to the Court of Arbitration for Sport and, on 1 March 2011, awarded Udinese a sum of €2,250,055.

==== Galatasaray (loan) ====
He was loaned out to Galatasaray for the 2008–09 season. He played all the league and European matches since 31 August.

=== Napoli ===
On 24 July 2009, Napoli signed the goalkeeper from Sevilla FC on a four-year deal for €1.5 million.

=== Roma ===
On 25 July 2013, Roma signed De Sanctis on a two-year deal from Napoli for a transfer fee of €500,000. He had aided to Roma's perfect start to the Serie A season, keeping nine clean sheets in the first ten games, conceding just once as they topped the table on 30 points. On 5 January 2014, in a crucial match against Juventus, he conceded three goals for the first time of the season, meaning that Roma were now 8 points behind Juventus at the top of the table. During the 2013–14 season, he went 745 consecutive minutes without conceding a goal in the Italian top-flight; he currently holds the joint seventh-highest unbeaten streak in Serie A, alongside Luca Marchegiani.

=== Monaco ===
On 13 July 2016, De Sanctis was signed by Monaco on a one-year deal.

He made his debut for the club on 26 July, in the first leg of the Third qualifying round of the UEFA Champions League against Fenerbahçe, but was forced off in the 12th minute of the eventual 2–1 away defeat after sustaining an injury. He served as the club's second goalkeeper throughout the season, making his only Ligue 1 appearance on 10 September, in a 4–1 away win over Lille. On 6 December, he featured in Monaco's 3–0 defeat to Bayer Leverkusen in the Champions League, becoming the first Italian player to play in the competition with five different clubs (Udinese, Sevilla, Napoli, Roma, and Monaco). Monaco went on to reach the semi-finals of the tournament, losing out to De Sanctis's former club Juventus. On 26 April 2017, he started in the club's 5–0 defeat to eventual champions Paris Saint-Germain in the Coupe de France semi-final.

Monaco finished the 2016–17 season as Ligue 1 champions. After De Sanctis's contract expired with the club on 31 July 2017, he announced his retirement from professional football.

== International career ==
At youth level, De Sanctis represented the Italy under-21 side on seven occasions between 1999 and 2000, and won the 2000 UEFA European Under-21 Championship with the team. He was also part of the Italy squad that took part at the 2000 Summer Olympics in Sydney.

De Sanctis never became a regular in the Italian senior national team due to the consistency of Gianluigi Buffon, and therefore often served as a back-up keeper. De Sanctis made his senior international debut for Italy on 30 March 2005, under manager Marcello Lippi, in a 0–0 friendly draw against Iceland. Although he did not make Lippi's 23-man squad for the 2006 FIFA World Cup, he was chosen as one of the four back-up players to be called up in the event of an injury to Buffon, Angelo Peruzzi or Marco Amelia. After the 2006 FIFA World Cup, he secured a place as the team's number two goalkeeper to travel with the Italian squad to UEFA Euro 2008, under Roberto Donadoni, as well as the 2009 FIFA Confederations Cup and the 2010 FIFA World Cup, under Lippi. Although Buffon suffered an injury in the opening match of the latter tournament, De Sanctis did not feature in any matches, as Federico Marchetti was instead chosen to start; Italy were eliminated in the first round.

The team's subsequent coach Cesare Prandelli preferred to include younger understudies, such as Antonio Mirante and Salvatore Sirigu, to Buffon, instead of De Sanctis. However, after injury to Emiliano Viviano, De Sanctis returned to the squad as Buffon's back-up for UEFA Euro 2012 qualifying matches in September 2011, and also appeared in Italy's 3–0 friendly win against Northern Ireland in Pescara on 11 October, three years after his last cap for Italy. He eventually made the squad for the final tournament, but did not play, as Italy reached the final. His final match for Italy came on 16 October 2012, in a 3–1 win over Denmark in a 2014 World Cup qualifier. On 26 March 2013, the day of his 36th birthday, he announced that he would be retiring from international football after Italy's World Cup qualifier against Malta later that day. In total, he made 6 appearances for Italy.

== Style of play ==
A reliable goalkeeper, known for his leadership from the back and vocal presence on the pitch, in his prime, De Sanctis was mostly known for his shot-stopping ability, positioning, handling, and speed when rushing off his line, and is regarded as one of the best Italian goalkeepers of his generation; he was also good at stopping penalties.

== Post-playing career ==
After retiring as a player, De Sanctis was appointed a team manager with his former club Roma in August 2017.

In the autumn of 2017, he enrolled in an UEFA's coaching programme, which allowed him to coach youth teams, and first teams in Serie C, as well as hold assistant manager positions in Serie B and Serie A. On 15 December, he received his coaching licence.

In December 2018, he also obtained his sporting director degree through the Coverciano Technical Centre.

After serving as deputy sporting director of Roma for a short period, working alongside sporting director Tiago Pinto, De Sanctis left the Giallorossi in February 2022. Later in June 2022, he was appointed sporting director of Serie A club Salernitana. He left the club on 21 December 2023 by mutual consent, following the appointment of his predecessor Walter Sabatini as the club's new managing director.

On 7 June 2024, De Sanctis was announced as the new sporting director of Serie B club Palermo. He was dismissed from his post on 3 January 2025, together with his collaborator Giulio Migliaccio, due to Palermo underperforming in the first half of the season and him being publicly criticised by the local supporters.

== Personal life ==
On January 5, 2021, De Sanctis was involved in a car accident in Rome, which caused severe injuries to him. He was rushed to hospital and had undergone an operation on an abdominal haemorrhage, where his spleen was removed.

== Career statistics ==
=== Club ===
Appearances and goals by club, season and competition
Club	Season	League			National cup (Note: Includes Coppa Italia, Copa del Rey, Coupe de France)		Europe		Other		Total	
Club	Season	Division	Apps	Goals	Apps	Goals	Apps	Goals	Apps	Goals	Apps	Goals
Pescara	1994–95	Serie B	30	0	0	0	—		—		30	0
Pescara	1995–96	Serie B	18	0	2	0	—		—		20	0
Pescara	1996–97	Serie B	26	0	3	0	—		—		29	0
Pescara	Total		74	0	5	0	—		—		79	0
Juventus	1997–98	Serie A	0	0	0	0	0	0	0	0	0	0
Juventus	1998–99	Serie A	3	0	1	0	0	0	0	0	4	0
Juventus	Total		3	0	1	0	0	0	0	0	4	0
Udinese	1999–2000	Serie A	7	0	1	0	2 (Note: Appearances in UEFA Cup)	0	—		10	0
Udinese	2000–01	Serie A	3	0	2	0	—		—		5	0
Udinese	2001–02	Serie A	10	0	4	0	—		—		14	0
Udinese	2002–03	Serie A	34	0	0	0	—		—		34	0
Udinese	2003–04	Serie A	34	0	0	0	2	0	—		36	0
Udinese	2004–05	Serie A	36	0	4	0	2	0	—		42	0
Udinese	2005–06	Serie A	34	0	4	0	12 (Note: Eight appearances in UEFA Champions League, four appearances in UEFA Cup)	0	—		50	0
Udinese	2006–07	Serie A	36	0	3	0	—		—		39	0
Udinese	Total		194	0	18	0	18	0	—		230	0
Sevilla	2007–08	La Liga	8	0	4	0	1 (Note: Appearances in UEFA Champions League)	0	0	0	13	0
Galatasaray	2008–09	Süper Lig	31	0	0	0	10	0	0	0	41	0
Napoli	2009–10	Serie A	38	0	1	0	—		—		39	0
Napoli	2010–11	Serie A	38	0	1	0	10 (Note: Appearances in UEFA Europa League)	0	—		49	0
Napoli	2011–12	Serie A	37	0	4	0	8	0	—		49	0
Napoli	2012–13	Serie A	34	0	1	0	2	0	1 (Note: Appearance in Supercoppa Italiana)	0	38	0
Napoli	Total		147	0	7	0	20	0	1	0	175	0
Roma	2013–14	Serie A	36	0	3	0	—		—		39	0
Roma	2014–15	Serie A	35	0	0	0	4	0	—		39	0
Roma	2015–16	Serie A	0	0	0	0	1	0	—		1	0
Roma	Total		71	0	3	0	5	0	—		79	0
Monaco	2016–17	Ligue 1	1	0	5	0	2	0	—		8	0
Career total			529	0	42	0	56	0	1	0	632	0

=== International ===
Appearances and goals by national team and year
National team	Year	Apps	Goals
Italy
Italy	2005	2	0
Italy	2006	0	0
Italy	2008	1	0
Italy	2009	0	0
Italy	2010	0	0
Italy	2011	1	0
Italy	2012	2	0
Italy	2013	0	0
Total		6	0

== Honours ==
=== Club ===
Juventus

- Serie A: 1997–98
- Supercoppa Italiana: 1997

Udinese

- UEFA Intertoto Cup: 2000

Galatasaray

- Turkish Super Cup: 2008

Napoli

- Coppa Italia: 2011–12

Monaco

- Ligue 1: 2016–17

=== International ===
Italy

- UEFA European Championship: Runner-up 2012

=== Individual ===
- Pallone d'Argento: 2009–10
