= Luigi Lamberti =

Italian composer

Luigi Lamberti (22 October 1769 – after 1812) was an Italian composer of operas and other pieces. He was born in Savona and, like Francesco Gnecco, he studied with Mariani, the maestro di capella of the Savona cathedral. Once his master died, he succeeded in the position. However, he was said to be of a restless spirit and abandoned the position. Moving to Paris in 1806, he published a number of compositions dedicated to princess Pauline Bonaparte. In Italy, he composed the operas Orfeo (1796), L' Amante Schernito, and I Due Fratelli Originali. He was prolific. He also composed various masses; vespers and hymns including two Tantum ergo and a Miserere; motets; concertos for three, four and five strings; and symphonies, among them are two titled Pubblio Claudio and The Death of Louis XVI. While he lived in Paris in 1812, it is not known what became of him afterward.
