= Marco Murriero =

Italian footballer

Personal information
- Date of birth: 20 January 1983 (age 43)
- Place of birth: Milan, Italy
- Height: 1.83 m (6 ft 0 in)
- Position: Goalkeeper

Senior career*
Years	Team	Apps	(Gls)
2005–2006	Bellinzona	14	(0)
2006–2007	Udinese	0	(0)
2007–2008	Martina	13	(0)

International career
	Padania	9	(0)
- * Club domestic league appearances and goals

Marco Murriero (born 20 January 1983) is an Italian football goalkeeper who last played for Martina.

Murriero was signed by Udinese in January 2006. He also played for Bellinzona from Italian speaking region at Swiss Challenge League. In summer 2007, Murriero joined Martina in co-ownership deal.

After Martina was not admitted to Lega Pro Seconda Divisione 2008–09, Murriero became free agent.
