= Federico Laurito =

Argentine footballer

Personal information
- Full name: Federico Raúl Laurito
- Date of birth: 18 May 1990 (age 36)
- Place of birth: Rosario, Argentina
- Height: 1.82 m (5 ft 11 1/2 in)
- Position: Forward

Youth career
- 2006–2007: Newell's Old Boys
- 2007–2008: Udinese

Senior career*
Years	Team	Apps	(Gls)
2008–2013	Udinese	0	(0)
2008–2009	→ Livorno (loan)	2	(0)
2009	→ Venezia (loan)	6	(0)
2009–2010	→ Huracán (loan)	11	(1)
2011	→ Empoli (loan)	9	(1)
2011–2012	→ Deportivo Cuenca (loan)	28	(16)
2013–2016	Universidad Católica	50	(29)
2014–2015	→ Barcelona SC (loan)	8	(1)
2015–2016	→ Arsenal de Sarandí (loan)	1	(0)
2016–2017	Unión La Calera	13	(3)
2017	Gualaceo SC	?	(1)
2017–2018	Fuerza Amarilla	7	(1)
2019	América de Quito	?	(13)
2019	LDU Portoviejo	?	(11)
2020	Independiente Medellín	3	(0)

International career
2005–2007	Argentina U17		
- * Club domestic league appearances and goals

Federico Raúl Laurito (born 18 May 1990) is a retired Argentine professional footballer.

After 8 months without a club, 30-year-old Laurito confirmed in February 2021 that he stopped playing professionally as he never recovered from a knee injury.
