= Niccolò Lamberti =

Italian painter

Niccolo Lamberti (late 14th century) was an Italian painter of the Florentine school, active in 1382.

He was a pupil of the Orcagna, and painted in company with Jacopo (?) in the palace at Volterra a fresco representing the Annunciation" with Saints. His son Pietro was active in Venice.
