= Webster ruling =

2008 decision of the Court of Arbitration for Sport

The Webster ruling is a test case in association football law involving Andy Webster, a defender formerly with Heart of Midlothian football club in Edinburgh, Scotland. In September 2006 he became the first player to exploit the updated transfer regulations of FIFA, football's governing body, which stipulated that players are able to unilaterally walk away from a contract after a fixed period, regardless of the duration of the contract itself. Although the long-term effects of the decision remain unclear, it has been compared to the landmark Bosman ruling of 1995 in its potential significance.

== Background ==
=== Regulations for the Status and Transfer of Players ===
The regulations which led to the Webster ruling were enacted in response to the European Commission, who in 1998 opined that FIFA's then current football transfer system served as an obstruction to players' freedom of movement compared to workers in other industries. FIFA, and its European governing body UEFA, campaigned for a special exemption for football, but after the commission threatened to abolish the system, the new regulations were put in place by September 2001. Because of the complexity and potential legal ramifications for players, it was five years before Webster's test case emerged.

=== Article 17 ===
Article 17 of FIFA's Regulations for the Status and Transfer of Players is entitled "Consequences of Terminating a Contract Without Just Cause", and is the fifth article of Chapter IV, "Maintenance of Contractual Stability between Professionals and Clubs". It outlines the provisions which apply if a contract is terminated without just cause, and the requirement for the party in breach to pay compensation. Specifically, it states that any player who signed a contract before the age of 28 can buy himself out of the contract three years after the deal was signed. If he is 28 or older the time limit is shortened to two years. Article 17 was introduced in December 2004, with effect from 1 July 2005.

=== Webster's transfers ===
In March 2001, Andy Webster joined Hearts from Arbroath F.C. for a reported £75,000, plus a "sell-on clause" which entitled Arbroath to 17.5 percent of any future sum received by Hearts for him. He played regularly for the next five years, and also played for the Scotland national football team. In July 2005, Glasgow side Rangers F.C. were credited with an interest in Webster, and the player requested permission to speak to them. This was refused, and Hearts told the player he would be part of their squad that season. However, in 2006 he became involved in a dispute with club owner Vladimir Romanov after refusing to extend his contract, and was subsequently omitted from the squad for the remainder of the 2005–06 season. Webster, who still had a year of his existing contract remaining, then signed for English Premiership club Wigan Athletic in August that year. The transfer was a protracted affair; it took several months before contracts were approved by FIFA, and the governing body took further time to ascertain if Webster's former club were due any compensation. The matter was further complicated by Hearts' initial refusal to release the player from their books as they sought to challenge the decision.

Despite the efforts made to sign him, Wigan did not provide Webster with a regular first team place, and in January 2007 he returned to Scotland after Rangers signed him on loan for the remainder of the 2006–07 season. Despite persistent injuries which prevented him playing, Rangers manager Walter Smith extended his loan contract to 2008, although a permanent move was not organised until June 2008 as litigation over the Hearts–Wigan transfer continued.

== FIFA and CAS rulings on the Webster case ==
Hearts had initially placed a valuation of £5 million on Webster. However, because he had served more than three years of his contract he was outside of FIFA's "protected period", and any compensation due to Hearts would, per Article 17, be based primarily on the amount of Webster's salary still outstanding—a figure estimated by Webster's advisors at approximately £250,000.

FIFA's transfer arbitration tribunal, the Dispute Resolution Chamber, met on 4 April 2007 and ruled that Hearts were due £625,000, based on Webster's future wages, his earning potential, and the legal costs. They also found Webster guilty of breaking his contract "without just cause", although only on a technicality; he and his agent were late informing the club of his intention to leave, because of confusion over the final match of the season (Hearts had reached the 2006 Scottish Cup Final, but the time limit was calculated from the club's last league game, four days prior to the Cup match). For this he was suspended for the first two weeks of the 2007–08 season.

Hearts were quick to lodge an appeal against the ruling, disputing the figure which they said had not been unambiguously calculated. Webster had also indicated a desire to appeal, believing the fine against him was excessive. On 30 January 2008 the Court of Arbitration for Sport, the highest arbitration authority in sport, met in Lausanne and clarified the original ruling. They also reduced the compensation due payable by Webster to £150,000.

== Reactions and analysis ==
The general assessment from commentators is that the ruling is the most significant since Jean-Marc Bosman successfully challenged the restrictions on freedom of movement for workers for footballers in 1995. There is also speculation that the days of record-breaking transfer fees may be at an end. High-profile players like Frank Lampard, Cristiano Ronaldo, Michael Owen, Steven Gerrard and Wayne Rooney have all been cited as examples of players who could either leave their club for a relatively small amount, or increase their contract bargaining power as a result. Several other players have taken advantage of Article 17, including Tony Sylva and Jonás Gutiérrez.

FIFA were highly critical of the ruling; president Sepp Blatter said "the verdict in favour of the player will have far-reaching and damaging effects on the game as a whole. [It] is... a Pyrrhic victory for those players and their agents who toy with the idea of rescinding contracts before they have been fulfilled." Football clubs were also hostile; A Hearts spokesman described it as a "dark day for football clubs", while Celtic, one of Hearts' and Rangers' rivals, stated bluntly that they would sue any player who broke his contract, believing that a court of law would support them regardless of any prior arbitration decision. The European Club Association has vocally criticised the ruling on several occasions, most notably after CAS decided Real Zaragoza had to compensate FC Shakhtar Donetsk for Brazilian midfielder Matuzalém's controversial transfer in May 2009.

Conversely, players' organisations were highly supportive of CAS's decision. Tony Higgins, a Scottish representative of international footballers' union FIFPro, said "Article 17 gives footballers the sort of employee rights that anyone else would expect in the workplace", while Fraser Wishart, the general secretary of the Scottish players' union who had supported Webster's case, described it as "a new groundbreaking decision enabling players to enjoy greater freedom of employment."

Despite the circumstances of his departure, Webster returned to play for Hearts again from February 2011 to May 2013, winning the Scottish Cup with the club in 2012.
