= 2018–19 Bologna FC 1909 season =

Bologna
2018–19 season
- President: Joey Saputo
- Manager: Filippo Inzaghi (until 28 January); Siniša Mihajlović (from 28 January)
- Stadium: Stadio Renato Dall'Ara
- Serie A: 10th
- Coppa Italia: Round of 16
- Top goalscorer: League: Riccardo Orsolini; Federico Santander (8 each); All: Riccardo Orsolini (10)
- Highest home attendance: 28,934 vs Juventus (24 February 2019, Serie A)
- Lowest home attendance: 3,075 vs Crotone (4 December 2018, Coppa Italia)
- Average home league attendance: 21,237
Home colours	Away colours	Third colours

The 2018–19 season was Bologna Football Club 1909's fourth season back in Serie A, after the club's relegation at the end of the 2013–14 season. Having finished 15th the previous season, the club competed in Serie A, finishing 10th, and in the Coppa Italia, where they were eliminated in the round of 16 by Juventus.

Roberto Donadoni, who coached the club during the 2015–16, 2016–17, and 2017–18 seasons, departed Bologna on 24 May 2018; he was replaced by former Juventus and Milan player and Italy international Filippo Inzaghi on 13 June. After a long period spent in 18th place and thus within the relegation zone, Inzaghi was in turn replaced by Siniša Mihajlović, on 28 January 2019.

== Players ==
=== Squad information ===
As of 25 May 2019

No.	Name	Nat	Position(s)	Date of birth (age)	Signed from	Signed in	Contract ends	Apps.	Goals	Notes
Goalkeepers
1	Angelo da Costa	(Brazil)	GK	12 November 1983 (aged 35)	(Italy) Sampdoria	2015	2020	36	0	
28	Łukasz Skorupski	(Poland)	GK	5 May 1991 (aged 28)	(Italy) Roma	2018	2023	38	0	
29	Antonio Santurro	(Dominican Republic)	GK	29 February 1992 (aged 27)	(Italy) Siracusa	2017	2020	1	0	
99	Caio Vinicius Pirana	(Brazil)	GK	8 May 1999 (aged 20)	(Italy) Campodarsego	2018	2023	0	0	
Defenders
4	Lyanco	(Brazil)	CB	1 February 1997 (aged 22)	(Italy) Torino	2019	2019	13	1	Loan
6	Nehuén Paz	(Argentina)	CB	28 April 1993 (aged 26)	(Argentina) Newell's Old Boys	2018	2021	2	0	
14	Federico Mattiello	(Italy)	RB / LB / RM	14 July 1995 (aged 23)	(Italy) Atalanta	2018	2019	17	1	Loan
15	Ibrahima Mbaye	(Senegal)	RB / LB	14 October 1994 (aged 24)	(Italy) Internazionale	2015	2023	87	4	
18	Filip Helander	(Sweden)	CB	22 April 1993 (aged 26)	(Italy) Hellas Verona	2016	2022	60	1	
23	Danilo	(Brazil)	CB	10 May 1984 (aged 35)	(Italy) Udinese	2018	2019	35	1	Loan
25	Gabriele Corbo	(Italy)	CB	11 January 2000 (aged 19)	(Italy) Spezia	2018	2023	1	0	
33	Arturo Calabresi	(Italy)	CB / RB	17 March 1996 (aged 23)	(Italy) Roma	2018	2022	18	1	
35	Mitchell Dijks	(Netherlands)	LB	9 February 1993 (aged 26)	(Netherlands) Ajax	2018	2023	25	1	
Midfielders
5	Erick Pulgar	(Chile)	DM / CB	15 January 1994 (aged 25)	(Chile) Universidad Católica	2015	2020	100	10	
8	Ádám Nagy	(Hungary)	DM / CM	17 June 1995 (aged 24)	(Hungary) Ferencváros	2016	2021	51	1	
16	Andrea Poli	(Italy)	CM	29 September 1989 (aged 29)	(Italy) Milan	2017	2021	62	6	
17	Godfred Donsah	(Ghana)	CM	7 June 1996 (aged 23)	(Italy) Cagliari	2015	2022	67	4	
19	Juan Manuel Valencia	(Colombia)	AM	20 June 1998 (aged 21)	(Colombia) Cortuluá	2017	2021	1	0	
21	Roberto Soriano	(Italy)	CM / LM / AM	8 February 1991 (aged 28)	(Spain) Villarreal	2019	2019	17	2	Loan
31	Blerim Džemaili	(Switzerland)	CM	12 April 1986 (aged 33)	(Turkey) Galatasaray	2016	2020	74	10	Captain
32	Mattias Svanberg	(Sweden)	CM	5 January 1999 (aged 20)	(Sweden) Malmö FF	2018	2023	23	0	
Forwards
7	Riccardo Orsolini	(Italy)	RW	24 January 1997 (aged 22)	(Italy) Juventus	2018	2019	43	8	Loan
9	Federico Santander	(Paraguay)	ST	4 June 1991 (aged 28)	(Denmark) Copenhagen	2018	2022	32	8	
10	Nicola Sansone	(Italy)	LW / SS / CF	10 September 1991 (aged 27)	(Spain) Villarreal	2019	2019	15	2	Loan
11	Ladislav Krejčí	(Czech Republic)	LW	5 July 1992 (aged 26)	(Czech Republic) Sparta Prague	2016	2020	67	1	
20	Simone Edera	(Italy)	RW	9 January 1997 (aged 22)	(Italy) Torino	2019	2019	4	0	Loan
22	Mattia Destro	(Italy)	ST	20 March 1991 (aged 28)	(Italy) Roma	2015	2020	100	29	Vice-captain
24	Rodrigo Palacio	(Argentina)	ST / SS	5 February 1982 (aged 37)	(Italy) Internazionale	2017	2019	56	6	
91	Diego Falcinelli	(Italy)	ST	26 June 1991 (aged 28)	(Italy) Sassuolo	2018	2022	16	0	
Players transferred during the season
3	Giancarlo González	(Costa Rica)	CB	8 February 1988 (aged 31)	(Italy) Palermo	2017	2020	34	0	
4	Sebastien De Maio	(France)	CB	5 March 1987 (aged 32)	(Belgium) Anderlecht	2017	2020	32	2	
30	Orji Okwonkwo	(Nigeria)	LW / RW / SS	19 January 1998 (aged 21)	(Italy) Youth Sector	2016	2021	27	3	

== Transfers ==
=== In ===
Date	Pos.	Player	Age	Moving from	Fee	Notes	Source
23 May 2018	DF	(Netherlands) Mitchell Dijks	25	(Netherlands) Ajax	Undisclosed		
21 June 2018	DF	(Italy) Arturo Calabresi	22	(Italy) Roma	Undisclosed		
21 June 2018	FW	(Paraguay) Federico Santander	27	(Denmark) Copenhagen	€6M		
22 June 2018	GK	(Poland) Łukasz Skorupski	27	(Italy) Roma	€9M		
1 July 2018	FW	(Nigeria) Orji Okwonkwo	20	(Italy) Brescia	Free	Loan return	
1 July 2018	DF	(Argentina) Nehuén Paz	25	(Argentina) Lanús	Free	Loan return	
1 July 2018	FW	(Croatia) Bruno Petković	23	(Italy) Hellas Verona	Free	Loan return	
1 July 2018	MF	(Italy) Luca Rizzo	26	(Italy) Atalanta	Free	Loan return	
4 July 2018	FW	(Italy) Diego Falcinelli	27	(Italy) Sassuolo	N/A	Part of swap deal for Federico Di Francesco	
5 July 2018	MF	(Sweden) Mattias Svanberg	19	(Sweden) Malmö FF	Undisclosed		

==== Loans in ====
Date	Pos.	Player	Age	Moving from	Fee	Notes	Source
20 July 2018	DF	(Italy) Federico Mattiello	23	(Italy) Atalanta	Loan	Loan with an obligation to buy	
16 August 2018	DF	(Brazil) Danilo	34	(Italy) Udinese	Loan	Loan with an obligation to buy	

=== Out ===
Date	Pos.	Player	Age	Moving to	Fee	Notes	Source
11 June 2018	FW	(Italy) Simone Verdi	25	(Italy) Napoli	€25M		
22 June 2018	GK	(Italy) Antonio Mirante	34	(Italy) Roma	€4M		
1 July 2018	DF	(Mali) Cheick Keita	22	(England) Birmingham City	Free	Loan return	
1 July 2018	DF	(Italy) Simone Romagnoli	28	(Italy) Empoli	Free	Loan return	
1 July 2018	DF	(Greece) Vasilis Torosidis	33	Unattached	Free	End of contract	
2 July 2018	DF	(Italy) Adam Masina	25	(England) Watford	€5M		
4 July 2018	FW	(Italy) Federico Di Francesco	24	(Italy) Sassuolo	N/A	Part of swap deal for Diego Falcinelli	
4 July 2018	MF	(Italy) Filippo Falco	26	(Italy) Lecce	Undisclosed		
4 August 2018	FW	(Croatia) Bruno Petković	23	(Croatia) Dinamo Zagreb	Undisclosed		

==== Loans out ====
Date	Pos.	Player	Age	Moving to	Fee	Notes	Source
13 June 2018	DF	(Italy) Alex Ferrari	23	(Italy) Sampdoria	Loan		
28 June 2018	DF	(Greece) Marios Oikonomou	25	(Greece) AEK Athens	Loan	Loan with an option to buy	
10 July 2018	MF	(Italy) Lorenzo Crisetig	25	(Italy) Frosinone	Loan	Loan with an option to buy	
9 August 2018	DF	(Sweden) Emil Krafth	24	(France) Amiens	Loan	Loan with an option to buy	
13 August 2018	MF	(Uruguay) César Falletti	25	(Italy) Palermo	Loan		
17 August 2018	MF	(Italy) Luca Rizzo	26	(Italy) Foggia	Loan		
21 August 2018	FW	(Uruguay) Felipe Avenatti	25	(Belgium) Kortrijk	Loan		

== Competitions ==
=== Serie A ===
==== League table ====
Pos	Team	Pld	W	D	L	GF	GA	GD	Pts	Qualification or relegation
8	Lazio	38	17	8	13	56	46	+10	57 (Note: Lazio were deducted 2 points by the Italian Football Federation.)	Qualification for the Europa League group stage (Note: Lazio qualified for the Europa League group stage by winning the 2018–19 Coppa Italia)
9	Sampdoria	38	15	8	15	60	51	+9	53	
10	Bologna	38	11	11	16	48	56	−8	44	
11	Sassuolo	38	9	16	13	53	60	−7	43	
12	Udinese	38	11	10	17	39	53	−14	43	

Source: Serie A, Soccerway
Rules for classification: 1) Points; 2) Head-to-head points; 3) Head-to-head goal difference; 4) Goal difference; 5) Goals scored; 6) Draw. (Note: Head-to-head record is used only after all the matches between the teams in question have been played).

==== Results summary ====
Overall								Home						Away					
Pld	W	D	L	GF	GA	GD	Pts	W	D	L	GF	GA	GD	W	D	L	GF	GA	GD
38	11	11	16	48	56	−8	44	9	4	6	28	22	+6	2	7	10	20	34	−14

Last updated: 25 May 2019.
Source: Competitive matches

==== Results by round ====
Round	1	2	3	4	5	6	7	8	9	10	11	12	13	14	15	16	17	18	19	20	21	22	23	24	25	26	27	28	29	30	31	32	33	34	35	36	37	38
Ground	H	A	H	A	H	A	H	A	H	A	H	A	H	A	A	H	A	H	A	A	H	A	H	A	H	A	H	A	H	A	H	A	H	H	A	H	A	H
Result	L	D	L	L	W	L	W	L	D	D	L	D	D	L	L	D	D	L	L	D	L	W	D	L	L	L	W	W	W	L	W	D	W	W	L	W	D	W
Position	16	14	17	18	18	18	15	16	17	17	17	16	18	18	18	18	18	18	18	18	18	18	17	18	18	18	18	18	17	18	17	17	16	14	15	13	12	10

Updated to match(es) played on 25 May 2019. Source: Competitive matches
A = Away; H = Home; W = Win; D = Draw; L = Loss

==== Matches ====
19 August 2018 1	Bologna	0–1	SPAL	Bologna
20:30 CEST (UTC+02:00)	Pulgar (yellow card) 20'; Mattiello (yellow card) 64'; Nagy (yellow card) 68' (yellow-red card) 90'	Report	Fares (yellow card) 45+1'; Kurtić 71'; Felipe (yellow card) 82'	Stadium: Stadio Renato Dall'Ara; Attendance: 21,158; Referee: Piero Giacomelli

26 August 2018 2	Frosinone	0–0	Bologna	Turin
20:30 CEST (UTC+02:00)	Perica (yellow card) 61'; Krajnc (yellow card) 86'	Report	Okwonkwo (yellow card) 84'	Stadium: Stadio Olimpico Grande Torino; Attendance: 0 Referee: Gianluca Manganiello
Note: Match played at the Stadio Olimpico Grande Torino instead of Frosinone's home stadium as punishment for unsporting behavior during the 2017–18 Serie B promotion play-off against Palermo.

1 September 2018 3	Bologna	0–3	Internazionale	Bologna
18:00 CEST (UTC+02:00)	Džemaili (yellow card) 60'	Report	Nainggolan 67'; Candreva 82'; Perišić 85'; Gagliardini (yellow card) 88'	Stadium: Stadio Renato Dall'Ara; Attendance: 26,082; Referee: Marco Di Bello

16 September 2018 4	Genoa	1–0	Bologna	Genoa
15:00 CEST (UTC+02:00)	Bessa (yellow card) 65'; Piątek 69'; Marchetti (yellow card) 90+8'	Report	Destro (yellow card) 2'; Dijks (yellow card) 39'; González (yellow card) 57'; Džemaili (yellow card) 61'; Pulgar (red card) 90+7'; Skorupski (yellow card) 90+8'	Stadium: Stadio Luigi Ferraris; Attendance: 20,032; Referee: Luca Banti

23 September 2018 5	Bologna	2–0	Roma	Bologna
15:00 CEST (UTC+02:00)	Mattiello 36'; Santander 59'; Mbaye (yellow card) 90+1'; De Maio (yellow card) 90+3'	Report	De Rossi (yellow card) 30'; Cristante (yellow card) 33'; Fazio (yellow card) 63'; Lo. Pellegrini (yellow card) 79'	Stadium: Stadio Renato Dall'Ara; Attendance: 20,067; Referee: Davide Massa

26 September 2018 6	Juventus	2–0	Bologna	Turin
20:30 CEST (UTC+02:00)	Dybala 12'; Matuidi 16'; Pjanić (yellow card) 33'; Cuadrado (yellow card) 74'	Report	Paz (yellow card) 37'; Danilo (yellow card) 67'; Calabresi (yellow card) 71'	Stadium: Allianz Stadium; Attendance: 38,472; Referee: Maurizio Mariani

30 September 2018 7	Bologna	2–1	Udinese	Bologna
12:30 CEST (UTC+02:00)	Santander 42'; Svanberg (yellow card) 47'; Nagy (yellow card) 58'; Orsolini 82'	Report	Pussetto 32', (yellow card) 54'; De Paul (yellow card) 69'; Behrami (yellow card) 72'; Machís (yellow card) 90+1'	Stadium: Stadio Renato Dall'Ara; Attendance: 19,039; Referee: Gianluca Manganiello

6 October 2018 8	Cagliari	2–0	Bologna	Cagliari
15:00 CEST (UTC+02:00)	João Pedro 22'; Pisacane (yellow card) 25'; Dessena (yellow card) 67'; Pavoletti 68'	Report	De Maio (yellow card) 14'; Dijks (yellow card) 35'; Okwonkwo (yellow card) 67'; Santander (yellow card) 90'	Stadium: Sardegna Arena; Attendance: 15,019; Referee: Fabrizio Pasqua

21 October 2018 9	Bologna	2–2	Torino	Bologna
15:00 CEST (UTC+02:00)	Calabresi (yellow card) 39', (goal) 77'; Santander 59'; Mbaye (yellow card) 64'	Report	Falque 14'; Belotti (yellow card) 27'; Baselli 54', (yellow card) 61'	Stadium: Stadio Renato Dall'Ara; Attendance: 23,245; Referee: Luca Banti

28 October 2018 10	Sassuolo	2–2	Bologna	Reggio Emilia
12:30 CET (UTC+01:00)	Marlon 17'; Ferrari (yellow card) 28'; Magnanelli (yellow card) 38'; Boateng 85' (pen.)	Report	Palacio 2', (yellow card) 49'; Poli (yellow card) 19'; Svanberg (yellow card) 41'; Mbaye 56'	Stadium: Mapei Stadium – Città del Tricolore; Attendance: 12,647; Referee: Daniele Doveri

4 November 2018 11	Bologna	1–2	Atalanta	Bologna
18:00 CET (UTC+01:00)	Mbaye 3'; Helander (yellow card) 47'	Report	Iličić (yellow card) 24'; Gómez (yellow card) 41'; Mancini 57'; Zapata 70'	Stadium: Stadio Renato Dall'Ara; Attendance: 19,038; Referee: Federico La Penna

11 November 2018 12	Chievo	2–2	Bologna	Verona
15:00 CET (UTC+01:00)	Meggiorini (yellow card) 5', (goal) 20' (pen.); Bani (yellow card) 15'; Obi 45'; Kiyine (yellow card) 61'	Report	Santander 5'; Calabresi (yellow card) 19'; Helander (yellow card) 38'; Krejčí (yellow card) 51'; Orsolini 56'	Stadium: Stadio Marc'Antonio Bentegodi; Attendance: 11,000; Referee: Daniele Orsato

25 November 2018 13	Bologna	0–0	Fiorentina	Bologna
15:00 CET (UTC+01:00)	Calabresi (yellow card) 61'; Krejčí (yellow card) 74'; Palacio (yellow card) 87'	Report	Vitor Hugo (yellow card) 47'	Stadium: Stadio Renato Dall'Ara; Attendance: 21,241; Referee: Marco Di Bello

1 December 2018 14	Sampdoria	4–1	Bologna	Genoa
20:30 CET (UTC+01:00)	Praet 10'; Quagliarella 25', 68'; Ramírez 41'; Tonelli (yellow card) 55'; Linetty (yellow card) 78'; Bereszyński (yellow card) 88'	Report	Poli 17'; Calabresi (yellow card) 53'; Santander (yellow card) 67'; Palacio (yellow card) 69'	Stadium: Stadio Luigi Ferraris; Attendance: 17,844; Referee: Rosario Abisso

9 December 2018 15	Empoli	2–1	Bologna	Empoli
15:00 CET (UTC+01:00)	Caputo 10'; Veseli (yellow card) 35'; Capezzi (yellow card) 45+2'; La Gumina 80'	Report	Poli (yellow card) 23', (goal) 41'; Džemaili (yellow card) 87'	Stadium: Stadio Carlo Castellani; Attendance: 8,379; Referee: Paolo Valeri
Note: Leonardo Capezzi was cautioned for dissent while a substitute.

18 December 2018 16	Bologna	0–0	Milan	Bologna
20:30 CET (UTC+01:00)	Santander (yellow card) 42'; Helander (yellow card) 84'	Report	Calabria (yellow card) 40'; Bakayoko (yellow card) 73' (yellow-red card) 76'; Kessié (yellow card) 83'; Romagnoli (yellow card) 90+4'	Stadium: Stadio Renato Dall'Ara; Attendance: 22,214; Referee: Fabio Maresca

22 December 2018 17	Parma	0–0	Bologna	Parma
15:00 CET (UTC+01:00)	Alves (yellow card) 21'; Siligardi (yellow card) 30'; Scozzarella (yellow card) 39'	Report	Nagy (yellow card) 31'; Mattiello (yellow card) 49'; Danilo (yellow card) 89'	Stadium: Stadio Ennio Tardini; Attendance: 15,058; Referee: Rosario Abisso

26 December 2018 18	Bologna	0–2	Lazio	Bologna
15:00 CET (UTC+01:00)	Calabresi (yellow card) 45'; Palacio (yellow card) 81'	Report	Luiz Felipe 30'; Lulić 90'	Stadium: Stadio Renato Dall'Ara; Attendance: 19,230; Referee: Luca Pairetto

29 December 2018 19	Napoli	3–2	Bologna	Naples
18:00 CET (UTC+01:00)	Milik 16', 51'; Malcuit (yellow card) 80'; Mertens 88'; Allan (yellow card) 90+4'	Report	Pulgar (yellow card) 25'; Santander 37'; De Maio (yellow card) 46'; Danilo 80'	Stadium: Stadio San Paolo; Attendance: 46,585; Referee: Gianpaolo Calvarese

20 January 2019 20	SPAL	1–1	Bologna	Ferrara
15:00 CET (UTC+01:00)	Valdifiori (yellow card) 40'; Kurtić 64'; Cionek (yellow card) 90+6'	Report	Palacio 24'; Soriano (yellow card) 30'; Helander (yellow card) 77'; Pulgar (yellow card) 90+4'	Stadium: Stadio Paolo Mazza; Attendance: 14,524; Referee: Michael Fabbri

27 January 2019 21	Bologna	0–4	Frosinone	Bologna
15:00 CET (UTC+01:00)	Poli (yellow card) 12'; Mattiello (red card) 13'; Sansone (yellow card) 54'; Helander (yellow card) 74'	Report	Capuano (yellow card) 5'; Ghiglione 18'; Ciano 21', 75'; Salamon (yellow card) 32'; Pinamonti 52'; Cassata (yellow card) 64'; Gori (yellow card) 81'	Stadium: Stadio Renato Dall'Ara; Attendance: 16,076; Referee: Luca Banti

3 February 2019 22	Internazionale	0–1	Bologna	Milan
18:00 CET (UTC+01:00)	Vecino (yellow card) 44'	Report	Santander 33'; Mbaye (yellow card) 41'; Danilo (yellow card) 65'	Stadium: San Siro; Attendance: 51,566; Referee: Fabrizio Pasqua

10 February 2019 23	Bologna	1–1	Genoa	Bologna
12:30 CET (UTC+01:00)	Destro 17'; Palacio (yellow card) 58'; Mbaye (yellow card) 81'	Report	Lerager 33'; Lazović (yellow card) 64'; Sanabria (yellow card) 86'	Stadium: Stadio Renato Dall'Ara; Attendance: 17,385; Referee: Gianluca Rocchi

18 February 2019 24	Roma	2–1	Bologna	Rome
20:30 CET (UTC+01:00)	Cristante (yellow card) 34'; Florenzi (yellow card) 40'; Kolarov 55' (pen.); Fazio 73'; Manolas (yellow card) 90+3'	Report	Danilo (yellow card) 12'; Pulgar (yellow card) 24'; Edera (yellow card) 43'; Sansone 84'; Dijks (yellow card) 90+2'	Stadium: Stadio Olimpico; Attendance: 31,572; Referee: Marco Di Bello

24 February 2019 25	Bologna	0–1	Juventus	Bologna
15:00 CET (UTC+01:00)	Pulgar (yellow card) 6'; Sansone (yellow card) 74'	Report	Bentancur (yellow card) 16'; Dybala 67'; Cancelo (yellow card) 90+2'	Stadium: Stadio Renato Dall'Ara; Attendance: 28,934; Referee: Gianpaolo Calvarese

3 March 2019 26	Udinese	2–1	Bologna	Udine
15:00 CET (UTC+01:00)	De Paul 25' (pen.); Mandragora (yellow card) 38'; Zeegelaar (yellow card) 51'; Pussetto 79'; Okaka (yellow card) 90+2'	Report	Poli (yellow card) 23'; Palacio 39'; Santander (yellow card) 81'; Dijks (yellow card) 89'	Stadium: Dacia Arena; Attendance: 18,349; Referee: Davide Massa

10 March 2019 27	Bologna	2–0	Cagliari	Bologna
12:30 CET (UTC+01:00)	Pulgar 34' (pen.); Džemaili (yellow card) 52'; Soriano 77'	Report	Bradarić (yellow card) 51'; Barella (yellow card) 52'; Srna (yellow card) 57'; Pellegrini (yellow card) 70'	Stadium: Stadio Renato Dall'Ara; Attendance: 20,557; Referee: Massimiliano Irrati

16 March 2019 28	Torino	2–3	Bologna	Turin
20:30 CET (UTC+01:00)	Pulgar 6' (o.g.); Baselli (yellow card) 11'; Nkoulou (yellow card) 75'; Izzo 89'; Aina (yellow card) 90+2' (red card) 90+2'; Berenguer (yellow card) 90+5'	Report	Poli 29'; Pulgar 34' (pen.); Soriano (yellow card) 41'; Sansone (yellow card) 50'; Lyanco (yellow card) 56' (yellow-red card) 88'; Orsolini 64'	Stadium: Stadio Olimpico Grande Torino; Attendance: 24,863; Referee: Maurizio Mariani

31 March 2019 29	Bologna	2–1	Sassuolo	Bologna
18:00 CEST (UTC+02:00)	Helander (yellow card) 22'; Pulgar 68' (pen.); Destro 90+6', (yellow card) 90+8'	Report	Demiral (yellow card) 29'; Sensi (yellow card) 61'; Bourabia (yellow card) 86'; Boga 90+2'	Stadium: Stadio Renato Dall'Ara; Attendance: 23,551; Referee: Marco Guida

4 April 2019 30	Atalanta	4–1	Bologna	Bergamo
21:00 CEST (UTC+02:00)	Iličić 3', 5'; Hateboer 9', (yellow card) 87'; Zapata 15', (yellow card) 60'	Report	González (yellow card) 51'; Orsolini 54'; Calabresi (yellow card) 86'; Valencia (yellow card) 87'	Stadium: Stadio Atleti Azzurri d'Italia; Attendance: 18,441; Referee: Gianluca Rocchi

8 April 2019 31	Bologna	3–0	Chievo	Bologna
20:30 CEST (UTC+02:00)	Lyanco (yellow card) 34'; Pulgar 65' (pen.), 68' (pen.); Dijks 89'	Report	Andreolli (yellow card) 12'; Léris (yellow card) 26'; Depaoli (yellow card) 44'; Rigoni (yellow card) 49'; Dioussé (yellow card) 61'; Stępiński (yellow card) 63'; Bani (yellow card) 73' (yellow-red card) 79'	Stadium: Stadio Renato Dall'Ara; Attendance: 19,107; Referee: Luca Pairetto

14 April 2019 32	Fiorentina	0–0	Bologna	Florence
15:00 CEST (UTC+02:00)	Muriel (yellow card) 74'; Veretout (yellow card) 90+3'	Report	Dijks (yellow card) 28'; Palacio (yellow card) 76'; Santander (yellow card) 83'	Stadium: Stadio Artemio Franchi; Attendance: 29,394; Referee: Piero Giacomelli

20 April 2019 33	Bologna	3–0	Sampdoria	Bologna
15:00 CEST (UTC+02:00)	Soriano (yellow card) 52'; Tonelli 54' (o.g.); Orsolini (yellow card) 58', (goal) 83'; Pulgar 69'	Report	Murru (yellow card) 41'; Sala (yellow card) 48'; Andersen (yellow card) 53'; Tonelli (yellow card) 68'	Stadium: Stadio Renato Dall'Ara; Attendance: 21,391; Referee: Maurizio Mariani

27 April 2019 34	Bologna	3–1	Empoli	Bologna
15:00 CEST (UTC+02:00)	Mbaye (yellow card) 25'; Orsolini (yellow card) 35', (goal) 82'; Soriano 51', (yellow card) 79'; Sansone 90+5'	Report	Pajač (yellow card) 7', (goal) 17'; Krunić (yellow card) 54'	Stadium: Stadio Renato Dall'Ara; Attendance: 25,189; Referee: Paolo Valeri

6 May 2019 35	Milan	2–1	Bologna	Milan
20:30 CEST (UTC+02:00)	Suso 37'; Borini 67'; Paquetá (yellow card) 74' (red card) 75'; Kessié (yellow card) 90+6'	Report	Poli (yellow card) 44'; Sansone (yellow card) 57' (yellow-red card) 90+6'; Calabresi (yellow card) 65'; Destro 72'; Pulgar (yellow card) 75'; Dijks (red card) 90+7'	Stadium: San Siro; Attendance: 51,472; Referee: Marco Di Bello

13 May 2019 36	Bologna	4–1	Parma	Bologna
19:00 CEST (UTC+02:00)	Soriano (yellow card) 48'; Orsolini 52'; Sepe 59' (o.g.); Lyanco 72'; Sierralta 84' (o.g.)	Report	Dimarco (yellow card) 33'; Rigoni (yellow card) 35'; Gervinho (yellow card) 58'; Alves (yellow card) 62' (yellow-red card) 62'; Scozzarella (yellow card) 71'; Inglese 81'	Stadium: Stadio Renato Dall'Ara; Attendance: 20,656; Referee: Luca Pairetto

20 May 2019 37	Lazio	3–3	Bologna	Rome
20:30 CEST (UTC+02:00)	Correa 14', (yellow card) 66'; Bastos 59'; Lucas (yellow card) 67'; Milinković-Savić 80'	Report	Poli 50'; Destro 51', (yellow card) 52'; Orsolini 63'	Stadium: Stadio Olimpico; Attendance: 35,644; Referee: Fabrizio Pasqua

25 May 2019 38	Bologna	3–2	Napoli	Bologna
20:30 CEST (UTC+02:00)	Santander 43', 88'; Džemaili 45'	Report	Ghoulam 57'; Mertens 78'; Zieliński (yellow card) 79'	Stadium: Stadio Renato Dall'Ara; Attendance: 19,351; Referee: Aleandro Di Paolo

=== Coppa Italia ===
12 August 2018 Third round	Bologna	2–0	Padova	Bologna
21:00 CEST (UTC+02:00)	Džemaili 70' (pen.); Pulgar (yellow card) 73'; Dijks 77'	Report	Pulzetti (yellow card) 31'; Salviato (yellow card) 51'	Stadium: Stadio Renato Dall'Ara; Attendance: 12,742; Referee: Michael Fabbri

4 December 2018 Fourth round	Bologna	3–0	Crotone	Bologna
18:00 CET (UTC+01:00)	Orsolini 40', 67'; Falcinelli 56'	Report	Sampirisi (yellow card) 18'; Zanellato (yellow card) 42'; Curado (yellow card) 55'	Stadium: Stadio Renato Dall'Ara; Attendance: 3,075; Referee: Juan Luca Sacchi

12 January 2019 Round of 16	Bologna	0–2	Juventus	Bologna
20:45 CET (UTC+01:00)	Soriano (yellow card) 82'	Report	Bernardeschi 9', (yellow card) 30'; De Sciglio (yellow card) 44'; Kean 49'; Can (yellow card) 69'	Stadium: Stadio Renato Dall'Ara; Attendance: 15,469; Referee: Federico La Penna

== Statistics ==
=== Appearances and goals ===
No.	Pos	Nat	Player	Total		Serie A		Coppa Italia	
No.	Pos	Nat	Player	Apps	Goals	Apps	Goals	Apps	Goals
Goalkeepers
1	GK	(Brazil) BRA	Angelo da Costa	2	0	0	0	2	0
28	GK	(Poland) POL	Łukasz Skorupski	39	0	38	0	1	0
29	GK	(Dominican Republic) DOM	Antonio Santurro	0	0	0	0	0	0
Defenders
4	DF	(Brazil) BRA	Lyanco	13	1	13	1	0	0
6	DF	(Argentina) ARG	Nehuén Paz	2	0	1+1	0	0	0
14	DF	(Italy) ITA	Federico Mattiello	19	1	16+1	1	2	0
15	DF	(Senegal) SEN	Ibrahima Mbaye	25	2	22+1	2	1+1	0
18	DF	(Sweden) SWE	Filip Helander	23	0	19+1	0	3	0
23	DF	(Brazil) BRA	Danilo	36	1	35	1	1	0
25	DF	(Italy) ITA	Gabriele Corbo	1	0	0+1	0	0	0
33	DF	(Italy) ITA	Arturo Calabresi	21	1	16+2	1	3	0
35	DF	(Netherlands) NED	Mitchell Dijks	28	2	23+2	1	3	1
Midfielders
5	MF	(Chile) CHI	Erick Pulgar	30	6	27+1	6	2	0
8	MF	(Hungary) HUN	Ádám Nagy	16	0	10+4	0	1+1	0
16	MF	(Italy) ITA	Andrea Poli	32	4	23+7	4	2	0
17	MF	(Ghana) GHA	Godfred Donsah	7	0	1+5	0	0+1	0
19	MF	(Colombia) COL	Juan Manuel Valencia	1	0	0+1	0	0	0
21	MF	(Italy) ITA	Roberto Soriano	18	2	17	2	1	0
31	MF	(Switzerland) SUI	Blerim Džemaili	30	2	20+8	1	1+1	1
32	MF	(Sweden) SWE	Mattias Svanberg	24	0	13+10	0	1	0
Forwards
7	FW	(Italy) ITA	Riccardo Orsolini	37	10	19+16	8	1+1	2
9	FW	(Paraguay) PAR	Federico Santander	33	8	22+9	8	1+1	0
10	FW	(Italy) ITA	Nicola Sansone	16	2	13+2	2	1	0
11	FW	(Czech Republic) CZE	Ladislav Krejčí	18	0	11+7	0	0	0
20	FW	(Italy) ITA	Simone Edera	4	0	3+1	0	0	0
22	FW	(Italy) ITA	Mattia Destro	18	4	5+12	4	1	0
24	FW	(Argentina) ARG	Rodrigo Palacio	31	3	26+2	3	1+2	0
91	FW	(Italy) ITA	Diego Falcinelli	18	1	8+8	0	2	1
Players transferred out during the season
3	DF	(Costa Rica) CRC	Giancarlo González	14	0	8+4	0	2	0
4	DF	(France) FRA	Sebastian De Maio	6	0	6	0	0	0
30	FW	(Nigeria) NGA	Orji Okwonkwo	9	0	2+6	0	0+1	0

Last updated: 25 May 2019
Source: Competitions

=== Goalscorers ===
Rank	No.	Pos	Nat	Name	Serie A	Coppa Italia	Total
1	7	FW	(Italy)	Riccardo Orsolini	8	2	10
2	9	FW	(Paraguay)	Federico Santander	8	0	8
3	5	MF	(Chile)	Erick Pulgar	6	0	6
4	16	MF	(Italy)	Andrea Poli	4	0	4
4	22	FW	(Italy)	Mattia Destro	4	0	4
6	24	FW	(Argentina)	Rodrigo Palacio	3	0	3
7	10	FW	(Italy)	Nicola Sansone	2	0	2
7	15	DF	(Senegal)	Ibrahima Mbaye	2	0	2
7	21	MF	(Italy)	Roberto Soriano	2	0	2
7	31	MF	(Switzerland)	Blerim Džemaili	1	1	2
11	4	DF	(Brazil)	Lyanco	1	0	1
11	14	DF	(Italy)	Federico Mattiello	1	0	1
11	23	DF	(Brazil)	Danilo	1	0	1
11	33	DF	(Italy)	Arturo Calabresi	1	0	1
11	35	DF	(Netherlands)	Mitchell Dijks	0	1	1
11	91	FW	(Italy)	Diego Falcinelli	0	1	1
Own goal					3	0	3
Totals					48	5	53

Last updated: 25 May 2019

=== Clean sheets ===
Rank	No.	Pos	Nat	Name	Serie A	Coppa Italia	Total
1	28	GK	(Poland)	Łukasz Skorupski	10	1	11
2	1	GK	(Brazil)	Angelo da Costa	0	1	1
Totals					10	2	12

Last updated: 25 May 2019

=== Disciplinary record ===
No.	Pos	Nat	Name	Serie A			Coppa Italia			Total		
No.	Pos	Nat	Name	Booked	(yellow card) (yellow-red card)	Sent off (straight red)	Booked	(yellow card) (yellow-red card)	Sent off (straight red)	Booked	(yellow card) (yellow-red card)	Sent off (straight red)
28	GK	(Poland)	Łukasz Skorupski	1	0	0	0	0	0	1	0	0
3	DF	(Costa Rica)	Giancarlo González	2	0	0	0	0	0	2	0	0
4	DF	(France)	Sebastian De Maio	3	0	0	0	0	0	3	0	0
4	DF	(Brazil)	Lyanco	1	1	0	0	0	0	1	1	0
6	DF	(Argentina)	Nehuén Paz	1	0	0	0	0	0	1	0	0
14	DF	(Italy)	Federico Mattiello	2	0	1	0	0	0	2	0	1
15	DF	(Senegal)	Ibrahima Mbaye	5	0	0	0	0	0	5	0	0
18	DF	(Sweden)	Filip Helander	6	0	0	0	0	0	6	0	0
23	DF	(Brazil)	Danilo	4	0	0	0	0	0	4	0	0
33	DF	(Italy)	Arturo Calabresi	8	0	0	0	0	0	8	0	0
35	DF	(Netherlands)	Mitchell Dijks	5	0	1	0	0	0	5	0	1
5	MF	(Chile)	Erick Pulgar	6	0	1	1	0	0	7	0	1
8	MF	(Hungary)	Ádám Nagy	2	1	0	0	0	0	2	1	0
16	MF	(Italy)	Andrea Poli	5	0	0	0	0	0	5	0	0
19	MF	(Colombia)	Juan Manuel Valencia	1	0	0	0	0	0	1	0	0
21	MF	(Italy)	Roberto Soriano	5	0	0	1	0	0	6	0	0
31	MF	(Switzerland)	Blerim Džemaili	4	0	0	0	0	0	4	0	0
32	MF	(Sweden)	Mattias Svanberg	2	0	0	0	0	0	2	0	0
7	FW	(Italy)	Riccardo Orsolini	2	0	0	0	0	0	2	0	0
9	FW	(Paraguay)	Federico Santander	5	0	0	0	0	0	5	0	0
10	FW	(Italy)	Nicola Sansone	3	1	0	0	0	0	3	1	0
11	FW	(Czech Republic)	Ladislav Krejčí	2	0	0	0	0	0	2	0	0
20	FW	(Italy)	Simone Edera	1	0	0	0	0	0	1	0	0
22	FW	(Italy)	Mattia Destro	3	0	0	0	0	0	3	0	0
24	FW	(Argentina)	Rodrigo Palacio	6	0	0	0	0	0	6	0	0
30	FW	(Nigeria)	Orji Okwonkwo	2	0	0	0	0	0	2	0	0
Totals				87	3	3	2	0	0	89	3	3

Last updated: 25 May 2019
