= 2017–18 Bologna FC 1909 season =

Bologna
2017–18 season
- President: Joey Saputo
- Manager: Roberto Donadoni
- Stadium: Stadio Renato Dall'Ara
- Serie A: 15th
- Coppa Italia: Third round
- Top goalscorer: League: Simone Verdi (10); All: Simone Verdi (10)
- Highest home attendance: 29,270 vs Juventus (17 December 2017, Serie A)
- Lowest home attendance: 9,184 vs Cittadella (12 August 2017, Coppa Italia)
- Average home league attendance: 20,903
Home colours	Away colours	Third colours

The 2017–18 season was Bologna Football Club 1909's third season back in Serie A, after the club's relegation at the end of the 2013–14 season. The club competed in Serie A, finishing 15th, and in the Coppa Italia, where they were eliminated in the third round by Serie B side Cittadella.

== Players ==
=== Squad information ===
As of 13 January 2018

Note: Flags indicate national team as defined under FIFA eligibility rules; some limited exceptions apply. Players may hold more than one non-FIFA nationality.

No.	Pos.	Nation	Player
1	GK	BRA	Angelo da Costa
2	MF	HUN	Ádám Nagy
3	DF	CRC	Giancarlo González
4	DF	SWE	Emil Krafth
5	MF	CHI	Erick Pulgar
6	DF	FRA	Sebastian De Maio
8	MF	ALG	Saphir Taïder
9	FW	ITA	Simone Verdi
10	FW	ITA	Mattia Destro
11	FW	CZE	Ladislav Krejčí
12	MF	ITA	Lorenzo Crisetig
14	FW	ITA	Federico Di Francesco
15	DF	SEN	Ibrahima Mbaye
16	MF	ITA	Andrea Poli

No.	Pos.	Nation	Player
17	MF	COL	Juan Manuel Valencia
18	DF	SWE	Filip Helander
20	DF	ITA	Domenico Maietta
21	MF	URU	César Falletti
24	FW	ARG	Rodrigo Palacio
25	DF	ITA	Adam Masina
28	DF	ITA	Daniele Gastaldello (captain)
29	GK	DOM	Antonio Santurro
30	FW	NGA	Orji Okwonkwo
34	GK	ITA	Federico Ravaglia
35	DF	GRE	Vasilis Torosidis
77	MF	GHA	Godfred Donsah
83	GK	ITA	Antonio Mirante

== Transfers ==
=== In ===
Date	Pos.	Player	Age	Moving from	Fee	Notes	Source
12 June 2017	DF	(Sweden) Filip Helander	24	(Italy) Hellas Verona	Undisclosed		
22 June 2017	DF	(Costa Rica) Giancarlo González	29	(Italy) Palermo	Undisclosed		
27 June 2017	DF	(France) Sebastian De Maio	30	(Belgium) Anderlecht	Undisclosed		
1 July 2017	DF	(Romania) Deian Boldor	22	(Italy) Hellas Verona	Loan return		
1 July 2017	MF	(Italy) Lorenzo Crisetig	24	(Italy) Crotone	Loan return		
1 July 2017	DF	(Italy) Alex Ferrari	23	(Italy) Hellas Verona	Loan return		
1 July 2017	FW	(France) Anthony Mounier	29	(Italy) Atalanta	Loan return		
1 July 2017	MF	(Italy) Andrea Poli	27	(Italy) Milan	Free		
17 August 2017	FW	(Argentina) Rodrigo Palacio	35	Unattached	Free		
13 January 2018	MF	(Italy) Luca Rizzo	25	(Italy) SPAL	Loan return		
19 January 2018	MF	(Switzerland) Blerim Džemaili	31	(Canada) Montreal Impact	Loan return		

==== Loans in ====
Date	Pos.	Player	Age	Moving from	Fee	Notes	Source
31 January 2018	FW	(Italy) Riccardo Orsolini	21	(Italy) Juventus	Loan		

=== Out ===
Date	Pos.	Player	Age	Moving to	Fee	Notes	Source
1 July 2017	FW	(Nigeria) Umar Sadiq	20	(Italy) Roma	Loan return		
1 July 2017	MF	(Italy) Federico Viviani	25	(Italy) Hellas Verona	Loan return		
31 August 2017	FW	(France) Anthony Mounier	29	(Greece) Panathinaikos	Undisclosed		

==== Loans out ====
Date	Pos.	Player	Age	Moving to	Fee	Notes	Source
9 May 2017	MF	(Switzerland) Blerim Džemaili	31	(Canada) Montreal Impact	Loan		
3 July 2017	DF	(Greece) Marios Oikonomou	24	(Italy) SPAL	Loan	Loan with an obligation to buy	
3 July 2017	MF	(Italy) Luca Rizzo	25	(Italy) SPAL	Loan	Loan with an option to buy	
11 January 2018	FW	(Croatia) Bruno Petković	23	(Italy) Hellas Verona	Loan		
13 January 2018	MF	(Italy) Luca Rizzo	25	(Italy) Atalanta	Loan	Loan with an option to buy	
19 January 2018	DF	(Romania) Deian Boldor	22	(Italy) Hellas Verona	Loan		
20 January 2018	MF	(Algeria) Saphir Taïder	25	(Canada) Montreal Impact	Loan		

== Pre-season and friendlies ==
16 July 2017	Bologna (Italy)	17–0	(San Marino) Virtus	Castelrotto
	Krejčí 3', 10'; Destro 7', 18', 45'; Falco 23', 26'; Falletti 30'; Nagy 42'; Taïder 43'; Di Francesco 46', 60', 89'; Petković 55', 71'; Verdi 68', 75'	Report		Referee: Zanonato

== Competitions ==
=== Serie A ===
==== League table ====
Pos	Team	Pld	W	D	L	GF	GA	GD	Pts
13	Chievo	38	10	10	18	36	59	−23	40 (Note: Chievo finished ahead of Udinese on head-to-head points: Chievo 1–1 Udinese, Udinese 1–2 Chievo.)
14	Udinese	38	12	4	22	48	63	−15	40
15	Bologna	38	11	6	21	40	52	−12	39
16	Cagliari	38	11	6	21	33	61	−28	39
17	SPAL	38	8	14	16	39	59	−20	38

Source: Serie A, Soccerway
Rules for classification: 1) Points; 2) Head-to-head points; 3) Head-to-head goal difference; 4) Goal difference; 5) Goals scored; 6) Draw.

==== Results summary ====
Overall								Home						Away					
Pld	W	D	L	GF	GA	GD	Pts	W	D	L	GF	GA	GD	W	D	L	GF	GA	GD
38	11	6	21	40	52	−12	39	6	4	9	25	26	−1	5	2	12	15	26	−11

Last updated: 20 May 2018.
Source: Competitive matches

==== Results by round ====
Round	1	2	3	4	5	6	7	8	9	10	11	12	13	14	15	16	17	18	19	20	21	22	23	24	25	26	27	28	29	30	31	32	33	34	35	36	37	38
Ground	H	A	H	A	H	A	A	H	A	H	A	H	A	H	H	A	H	A	H	A	H	A	H	A	H	H	A	H	A	H	A	H	A	A	H	A	H	A
Result	D	W	L	L	D	W	W	W	L	L	L	L	W	W	D	L	L	W	L	L	W	L	L	L	W	W	L	L	D	D	L	W	L	D	L	L	L	L
Position	8	8	9	13	13	11	10	7	8	11	12	12	10	8	9	11	12	12	12	12	12	12	12	12	12	12	12	12	11	11	11	11	11	12	12	13	13	15

Updated to match(es) played on 20 May 2018. Source: Competitive matches
A = Away; H = Home; W = Win; D = Draw; L = Loss

==== Matches ====
20 August 2017 1	Bologna	1–1	Torino	Bologna
20:45 CEST (UTC+02:00)	Di Francesco 27'; De Maio (yellow card) 48'; Pulgar (yellow card) 60'	Report	Ljajić 33'; Rincón (yellow card) 90+3'	Stadium: Stadio Renato Dall'Ara; Attendance: 19,033; Referee: Davide Massa

27 August 2017 2	Benevento	0–1	Bologna	Benevento
20:45 CEST (UTC+02:00)	Del Pinto (yellow card) 77'	Report	Poli (yellow card) 39'; Donsah 55'; Mirante (yellow card) 76'; De Maio (yellow card) 90+6'	Stadium: Stadio Ciro Vigorito; Attendance: 11,054; Referee: Gianpaolo Calvarese

10 September 2017 3	Bologna	0–3	Napoli	Bologna
20:45 CEST (UTC+02:00)	Helander (yellow card) 4'; Pulgar (yellow card) 12'; Destro (yellow card) 19'; Palacio (yellow card) 39'; Verdi (yellow card) 73'	Report	Chiricheș (yellow card) 18'; Callejón 66'; Mertens 83'; Zieliński 88'	Stadium: Stadio Renato Dall'Ara; Attendance: 22,398; Referee: Piero Giacomelli

16 September 2017 4	Fiorentina	2–1	Bologna	Florence
18:00 CEST (UTC+02:00)	Badelj (yellow card) 16'; Chiesa 51'; Pezzella 69'	Report	Palacio (yellow card) 9', (goal) 52'; Di Francesco (yellow card) 28'; Helander (yellow card) 76'	Stadium: Stadio Artemio Franchi; Attendance: 23,802; Referee: Paolo Valeri

19 September 2017 5	Bologna	1–1	Internazionale	Bologna
20:45 CEST (UTC+02:00)	Poli (yellow card) 19'; Verdi 32'; Donsah (yellow card) 44'; Mirante (yellow card) 76'; Petković (yellow card) 77'	Report	D'Ambrosio (yellow card) 29'; Icardi 77' (pen.); Éder (yellow card) 86'; Nagatomo (yellow card) 90+1'	Stadium: Stadio Renato Dall'Ara; Attendance: 26,067; Referee: Marco Di Bello

24 September 2017 6	Sassuolo	0–1	Bologna	Reggio Emilia
18:00 CEST (UTC+02:00)	Adjapong (yellow card) 52'; Magnanelli (yellow card) 73' (yellow-red card) 80'	Report	Pulgar (yellow card) 83'; Poli (yellow card) 86'; Okwonkwo 89', (yellow card) 90'; Donsah (yellow card) 90+2'	Stadium: Mapei Stadium – Città del Tricolore; Attendance: 10,805; Referee: Paolo Tagliavento

30 September 2017 7	Genoa	0–1	Bologna	Genoa
20:45 CEST (UTC+02:00)	Pellegri (yellow card) 6'; Palladino (yellow card) 38'; Rossettini (yellow card) 43'; Veloso (yellow card) 84'	Report	Helander (yellow card) 39'; Krafth (yellow card) 49'; Palacio 73'	Stadium: Stadio Luigi Ferraris; Attendance: 19,154; Referee: Gianluca Rocchi

15 October 2017 8	Bologna	2–1	SPAL	Bologna
15:00 CEST (UTC+02:00)	Masina (yellow card) 26'; Poli 30'; Salamon 49' (o.g.); Pulgar (yellow card) 55'	Report	Borriello (yellow card) 70'; Antenucci 88'; Costa (yellow card) 90+1'	Stadium: Stadio Renato Dall'Ara; Attendance: 24,074; Referee: Marco Guida

22 October 2017 9	Atalanta	1–0	Bologna	Bergamo
15:00 CEST (UTC+02:00)	Caldara (yellow card) 14'; Iličić (yellow card) 30'; De Roon (yellow card) 40'; Cornelius 71'	Report	Masina (yellow card) 42'; Palacio (yellow card) 56'; González (yellow card) 74' (yellow-red card) 80'	Stadium: Stadio Atleti Azzurri d'Italia; Attendance: 18,205; Referee: Fabio Maresca

25 October 2017 10	Bologna	1–2	Lazio	Bologna
CEST (UTC+02:00)	Masina (yellow card) 19'; Lulić 50' (o.g.); Falletti (yellow card) 85'	Report	Milinković-Savić 4'; Lulić 28'; Bastos (yellow card) 55'; Radu (yellow card) 73'	Stadium: Stadio Renato Dall'Ara; Attendance: 20,070; Referee: Davide Massa

28 October 2017 11	Roma	1–0	Bologna	Rome
20:45 CEST (UTC+02:00)	El Shaarawy 33'; De Rossi (yellow card) 71'	Report	Poli (yellow card) 48'; Pulgar (yellow card) 50'; Petković (yellow card) 69'; Helander (yellow card) 72'	Stadium: Stadio Olimpico; Attendance: 35,202; Referee: Michael Fabbri

4 November 2017 12	Bologna	2–3	Crotone	Bologna
18:00 CET (UTC+01:00)	Verdi 38', 45+1'; Krafth (yellow card) 67'; González (yellow card) 84'	Report	Budimir 42', 70', (yellow card) 48'; Sampirisi (yellow card) 44'; Simić (yellow card) 59'; Trotta 68' (pen.)	Stadium: Stadio Renato Dall'Ara; Attendance: 20,146; Referee: Fabrizio Pasqua

20 November 2017 13	Hellas Verona	2–3	Bologna	Verona
20:45 CET (UTC+01:00)	Büchel (yellow card) 8'; Cerci 12'; Cáceres 33'; Fares (yellow card) 59'	Report	González (yellow card) 6'; Destro 21'; Okwonkwo 74'; Donsah 76'	Stadium: Stadio Marc'Antonio Bentegodi; Attendance: 14,938; Referee: Maurizio Mariani

25 November 2017 14	Bologna	3–0	Sampdoria	Bologna
15:00 CET (UTC+01:00)	Verdi 3'; Mbaye 23'; Torosidis (yellow card) 44' (yellow-red card) 45+2'; Okwonkwo 73'	Report	Bereszyński (yellow card) 61'; Ferrari (yellow card) 70'	Stadium: Stadio Renato Dall'Ara; Attendance: 20,192; Referee: Fabio Maresca

3 December 2017 15	Bologna	1–1	Cagliari	Bologna
15:00 CET (UTC+01:00)	Destro (yellow card) 29', (goal) 81'; De Maio (yellow card) 44'; Palacio (yellow card) 62'; Maietta (yellow card) 64'; Poli (yellow card) 66'; Mirante (yellow card) 85'	Report	João Pedro 42'; Ceppitelli (yellow card) 47'; Barella (yellow card) 58'	Stadium: Stadio Renato Dall'Ara; Attendance: 21,940; Referee: Federico La Penna

10 December 2017 16	Milan	2–1	Bologna	Milan
20:45 CET (UTC+01:00)	Bonaventura 10', 76'	Report	Verdi 23'	Stadium: San Siro; Attendance: 39,504; Referee: Marco Guida

17 December 2017 17	Bologna	0–3	Juventus	Bologna
15:00 CET (UTC+01:00)	Masina (yellow card) 51'; Mbaye (yellow card) 60'; Petković (yellow card) 86'	Report	Pjanić 27'; Higuaín (yellow card) 31'; Mandžukić 36'; Matuidi 64'	Stadium: Stadio Renato Dall'Ara; Attendance: 29,270; Referee: Luca Banti

22 December 2017 18	Chievo	2–3	Bologna	Verona
18:00 CET (UTC+01:00)	Inglese 32'; Jaroszyński (yellow card) 73'; Tomović (yellow card) 77'; Cacciatore 85'	Report	Destro 4', 90'; Verdi 50'; Poli (yellow card) 60' (yellow-red card) 81'	Stadium: Stadio Marc'Antonio Bentegodi; Attendance: 7,000; Referee: Gianluca Manganiello

30 December 2017 19	Bologna	1–2	Udinese	Bologna
15:00 CET (UTC+01:00)	Danilo 27' (o.g.); Mirante (yellow card) 67'; Masina (yellow card) 78'	Report	Widmer 37'; Lasagna 48'; Stryger Larsen (yellow card) 53'; Behrami (yellow card) 57'; Danilo (yellow card) 76'	Stadium: Stadio Renato Dall'Ara; Attendance: 20,954; Referee: Claudio Gavillucci

6 January 2018 20	Torino	3–0	Bologna	Turin
12:30 CET (UTC+01:00)	Burdisso (yellow card) 20'; De Silvestri 38'; Niang 53'; Falque 85'	Report	González (yellow card) 43'; Okwonkwo (yellow card) 90+1'	Stadium: Stadio Olimpico Grande Torino; Attendance: 16,042; Referee: Antonio Damato

21 January 2018 21	Bologna	3–0	Benevento	Bologna
15:00 CET (UTC+01:00)	Poli (yellow card) 26'; Destro 35'; Džemaili (yellow card) 44', (goal) 88'; Mbaye (yellow card) 69'; De Maio 73'; Di Francesco (yellow card) 90+2'	Report	Venuti (yellow card) 34'; Memushaj (yellow card) 57'	Stadium: Stadio Renato Dall'Ara; Attendance: 20,515; Referee: Eugenio Abbattista

28 January 2018 22	Napoli	3–1	Bologna	Naples
15:00 CET (UTC+01:00)	Mbaye 5' (o.g.); Mertens 37' (pen.), 59'; Mário Rui (yellow card) 88'	Report	Palacio 1'; Masina (yellow card) 37'; De Maio (yellow card) 77'	Stadium: Stadio San Paolo; Attendance: 37,227; Referee: Paolo Mazzoleni

4 February 2018 23	Bologna	1–2	Fiorentina	Bologna
15:00 CET (UTC+01:00)	Pulgar 44'; Mbaye (yellow card) 64'; Poli (yellow card) 83'	Report	Mirante 41' (o.g.); Chiesa 71'; Biraghi (yellow card) 82'	Stadium: Stadio Renato Dall'Ara; Attendance: 19,301; Referee: Daniele Doveri

11 February 2018 24	Internazionale	2–1	Bologna	Milan
15:00 CET (UTC+01:00)	Éder 2'; Karamoh 63'; D'Ambrosio (yellow card) 80'	Report	Palacio (yellow card) 20', (goal) 25'; Mbaye (yellow card) 64' (yellow-red card) 68'; Masina (red card) 90+5'	Stadium: San Siro; Attendance: 46,915; Referee: Paolo Valeri

18 February 2018 25	Bologna	2–1	Sassuolo	Bologna
15:00 CET (UTC+01:00)	Poli 12'; De Maio (yellow card) 37'; Pulgar 88'	Report	Peluso (yellow card) 29'; Babacar 38'; Goldaniga (yellow card) 60' (yellow-red card) 86'; Ragusa (yellow card) 90+3'	Stadium: Stadio Renato Dall'Ara; Attendance: 16,271; Referee: Paolo Tagliavento

24 February 2018 26	Bologna	2–0	Genoa	Bologna
18:00 CET (UTC+01:00)	Di Francesco (yellow card) 28'; Destro 49', (yellow card) 50'; Falletti 72'	Report		Stadium: Stadio Renato Dall'Ara; Attendance: 16,383; Referee: Antonio Giua

3 March 2018 27	SPAL	1–0	Bologna	Ferrara
15:00 CET (UTC+01:00)	Lazzari (yellow card) 14'; Antenucci (yellow card) 36'; Mattiello (yellow card) 38' (yellow-red card) 90+3'; Felipe (yellow card) 43'; Grassi 48'	Report	González (red card) 10'; Džemaili (yellow card) 15'; Donsah (yellow card) 30'; Pulgar (yellow card) 72'	Stadium: Stadio Paolo Mazza; Attendance: 11,846; Referee: Gianluca Rocchi

11 March 2018 28	Bologna	0–1	Atalanta	Bologna
15:00 CET (UTC+01:00)	Avenatti (yellow card) 4'; Romagnoli (yellow card) 45+2'; Pulgar (yellow card) 58'	Report	De Roon 83'	Stadium: Stadio Renato Dall'Ara; Attendance: 17,917; Referee: Gianpaolo Calvarese

18 March 2018 29	Lazio	1–1	Bologna	Rome
18:00 CEST (UTC+02:00)	Lucas 16'; Wallace (yellow card) 25'; Bastos (yellow card) 58'	Report	Verdi 3'; De Maio (yellow card) 56'; Mirante (yellow card) 69'	Stadium: Stadio Olimpico; Attendance: 20,000; Referee: Antonio Damato

31 March 2018 30	Bologna	1–1	Roma	Bologna
12:30 CEST (UTC+02:00)	Pulgar 18', (yellow card) 72'; Santurro (yellow card) 36'; Palacio (yellow card) 87'	Report	De Rossi (yellow card) 45+2'; Džeko 76'	Stadium: Stadio Renato Dall'Ara; Attendance: 20,778; Referee: Massimiliano Irrati

8 April 2018 31	Crotone	1–0	Bologna	Crotone
15:00 CEST (UTC+02:00)	Simy 25'; Capuano (yellow card) 48'; Mandragora (yellow card) 74'	Report	Torosidis (yellow card) 42'; Di Francesco (yellow card) 44'; De Maio (yellow card) 86'; Džemaili (yellow card) 86'	Stadium: Stadio Ezio Scida; Attendance: 9,679; Referee: Gianpaolo Calvarese

15 April 2018 32	Bologna	2–0	Hellas Verona	Bologna
15:00 CEST (UTC+02:00)	Pulgar (yellow card) 20'; Verdi 31'; Crisetig (yellow card) 62'; Palacio (yellow card) 83'; Nagy 90+4'	Report	Caracciolo (yellow card) 17'; Lee Seung-woo (yellow card) 90+3'	Stadium: Stadio Renato Dall'Ara; Attendance: 19,172; Referee: Rosario Abisso

18 April 2018 33	Sampdoria	1–0	Bologna	Genoa
20:45 CEST (UTC+02:00)	Silvestre (yellow card) 55'; Zapata 90+3'	Report	Masina (yellow card) 39'; Palacio (yellow card) 80'; Crisetig (yellow card) 84'	Stadium: Stadio Luigi Ferraris; Attendance: 17,563; Referee: Gianluca Manganiello

22 April 2018 34	Cagliari	0–0	Bologna	Cagliari
12:30 CEST (UTC+02:00)	Padoin (yellow card) 38'; Cigarini (yellow card) 86'; Lykogiannis (yellow card) 87'	Report	González (yellow card) 23'; Crisetig (yellow card) 25'; Džemaili (yellow card) 36'; De Maio (yellow card) 63'; Nagy (yellow card) 86'	Stadium: Sardegna Arena; Attendance: 15,024; Referee: Daniele Doveri

29 April 2018 35	Bologna	1–2	Milan	Bologna
15:00 CEST (UTC+02:00)	Masina (yellow card) 52'; De Maio 74'	Report	Locatelli (yellow card) 23'; Çalhanoğlu 34'; Bonaventura 45+1'	Stadium: Stadio Renato Dall'Ara; Attendance: 24,263; Referee: Piero Giacomelli

5 May 2018 36	Juventus	3–1	Bologna	Turin
20:45 CEST (UTC+02:00)	Cuadrado (yellow card) 14'; Rugani (yellow card) 27'; De Maio 52' (o.g.); Khedira 63'; Dybala 69'	Report	Poli (yellow card) 18'; Verdi 30' (pen.); Crisetig (yellow card) 61'; Palacio (yellow card) 90'	Stadium: Allianz Stadium; Attendance: 40,714; Referee: Massimiliano Irrati

13 May 2018 37	Bologna	1–2	Chievo	Bologna
15:00 CEST (UTC+02:00)	Verdi 12' (pen.); Helander (yellow card) 22'	Report	Hetemaj (yellow card) 14'; Dainelli (yellow card) 17'; Giaccherini 48', (yellow card) 48'; Inglese 60'; Rigoni (yellow card) 63'	Stadium: Stadio Renato Dall'Ara; Attendance: 22,581; Referee: Luca Pairetto

20 May 2018 38	Udinese	1–0	Bologna	Udine
18:00 CEST (UTC+02:00)	Fofana 30'	Report	Torosidis (yellow card) 24'; Verdi (yellow card) 28'	Stadium: Dacia Arena; Attendance: 24,015; Referee: Claudio Gavillucci

=== Coppa Italia ===
12 August 2017 Third round	Bologna	0–3	Cittadella	Bologna
20:00 CEST (UTC+02:00)	Verdi (red card) 5'; Poli (yellow card) 10'; Masina (yellow card) 25'; De Maio (yellow card) 80'	Report	Kouamé 20'; Schenetti (yellow card) 37'; Pasa 42'; Litteri 45+1'; Iori (yellow card) 49'; Caccin (yellow card) 69'	Stadium: Stadio Renato Dall'Ara; Attendance: 9,184; Referee: Rosario Abisso

== Statistics ==
=== Appearances and goals ===
No.	Pos	Nat	Player	Total		Serie A		Coppa Italia	
No.	Pos	Nat	Player	Apps	Goals	Apps	Goals	Apps	Goals
Goalkeepers
1	GK	(Brazil) BRA	Angelo da Costa	4	0	4	0	0	0
29	GK	(Dominican Republic) DOM	Antonio Santurro	1	0	1	0	0	0
34	GK	(Italy) ITA	Federico Ravaglia	0	0	0	0	0	0
83	GK	(Italy) ITA	Antonio Mirante	34	0	33	0	1	0
Defenders
3	DF	(Costa Rica) CRC	Giancarlo González	23	0	22	0	1	0
4	DF	(Sweden) SWE	Emil Krafth	12	0	10+2	0	0	0
6	DF	(France) FRA	Sebastian De Maio	27	2	22+4	2	1	0
13	DF	(Italy) ITA	Fabrizio Brignani	0	0	0	0	0	0
15	DF	(Senegal) SEN	Ibrahima Mbaye	25	1	18+7	1	0	0
18	DF	(Sweden) SWE	Filip Helander	29	0	27+2	0	0	0
25	DF	(Italy) ITA	Adam Masina	35	0	33+1	0	1	0
26	DF	(Italy) ITA	Simone Romagnoli	8	0	6+2	0	0	0
33	DF	(France) FRA	Cheick Keita	3	0	1+2	0	0	0
35	DF	(Greece) GRE	Vasilis Torosidis	17	0	10+6	0	1	0
Midfielders
2	MF	(Hungary) HUN	Ádám Nagy	13	1	8+4	1	1	0
5	MF	(Chile) CHI	Erick Pulgar	33	3	31+1	3	1	0
7	MF	(Switzerland) SUI	Blerim Džemaili	15	1	14+1	1	0	0
12	MF	(Italy) ITA	Lorenzo Crisetig	8	0	6+2	0	0	0
16	MF	(Italy) ITA	Andrea Poli	33	2	32	2	1	0
17	MF	(Colombia) COL	Juan Manuel Valencia	0	0	0	0	0	0
21	MF	(Uruguay) URU	César Falletti	13	1	1+12	1	0	0
77	MF	(Ghana) GHA	Godfred Donsah	28	2	20+8	2	0	0
Forwards
8	FW	(Italy) ITA	Riccardo Orsolini	8	0	4+4	0	0	0
9	FW	(Italy) ITA	Simone Verdi	35	10	34	10	1	0
10	FW	(Italy) ITA	Mattia Destro	27	6	19+7	6	1	0
11	FW	(Czech Republic) CZE	Ladislav Krejčí	13	0	2+10	0	0+1	0
14	FW	(Italy) ITA	Federico Di Francesco	25	1	20+4	1	1	0
19	FW	(Uruguay) URU	Felipe Avenatti	11	0	4+7	0	0	0
24	FW	(Argentina) ARG	Rodrigo Palacio	28	4	23+5	4	0	0
Players transferred out during the season
7	FW	(Croatia) CRO	Bruno Petković	10	0	3+6	0	0+1	0
8	MF	(Algeria) ALG	Saphir Taïder	10	0	3+6	0	0+1	0
20	DF	(Italy) ITA	Domenico Maietta	7	0	6+1	0	0	0
30	FW	(Nigeria) NGA	Orji Okwonkwo	10	3	1+9	3	0	0

Last updated: 20 May 2018
Source: Competitions

=== Goalscorers ===
Rank	No.	Pos	Nat	Name	Serie A	Coppa Italia	Total
1	9	FW	(Italy)	Simone Verdi	10	0	10
2	10	FW	(Italy)	Mattia Destro	6	0	6
3	24	FW	(Argentina)	Rodrigo Palacio	4	0	4
4	5	MF	(Chile)	Erick Pulgar	3	0	3
4	30	FW	(Nigeria)	Orji Okwonkwo	3	0	3
6	6	DF	(France)	Sebastian De Maio	2	0	2
6	16	MF	(Italy)	Andrea Poli	2	0	2
6	77	MF	(Ghana)	Godfred Donsah	2	0	2
9	2	MF	(Hungary)	Ádám Nagy	1	0	1
9	7	MF	(Switzerland)	Blerim Džemaili	1	0	1
9	14	FW	(Italy)	Federico Di Francesco	1	0	1
9	15	DF	(Senegal)	Ibrahima Mbaye	1	0	1
9	21	MF	(Uruguay)	César Falletti	1	0	1
Own goal					3	0	3
Totals					40	0	40

Last updated: 20 May 2018

=== Clean sheets ===
Rank	No.	Pos	Nat	Name	Serie A	Coppa Italia	Total
1	83	GK	(Italy)	Antonio Mirante	7	0	7
2	1	GK	(Brazil)	Angelo da Costa	1	0	1
Totals					8	0	8

Last updated: 20 May 2018

=== Disciplinary record ===
No.	Pos	Nat	Name	Serie A			Coppa Italia			Total		
No.	Pos	Nat	Name	Booked	(yellow card) (yellow-red card)	Sent off (straight red)	Booked	(yellow card) (yellow-red card)	Sent off (straight red)	Booked	(yellow card) (yellow-red card)	Sent off (straight red)
29	GK	(Dominican Republic)	Antonio Santurro	1	0	0	0	0	0	1	0	0
83	GK	(Italy)	Antonio Mirante	5	0	0	0	0	0	5	0	0
3	DF	(Costa Rica)	Giancarlo González	4	1	1	0	0	0	4	1	1
4	DF	(Sweden)	Emil Krafth	2	0	0	0	0	0	2	0	0
6	DF	(France)	Sebastian De Maio	8	0	0	1	0	0	9	0	0
15	DF	(Senegal)	Ibrahima Mbaye	3	1	0	0	0	0	3	1	0
18	DF	(Sweden)	Filip Helander	5	0	0	0	0	0	5	0	0
20	DF	(Italy)	Domenico Maietta	1	0	0	0	0	0	1	0	0
25	DF	(Italy)	Adam Masina	8	0	1	1	0	0	9	0	1
26	DF	(Italy)	Simone Romagnoli	1	0	0	0	0	0	1	0	0
35	DF	(Greece)	Vasilis Torosidis	2	1	0	0	0	0	2	1	0
2	MF	(Hungary)	Ádám Nagy	1	0	0	0	0	0	1	0	0
5	MF	(Chile)	Erick Pulgar	9	0	0	0	0	0	9	0	0
7	MF	(Switzerland)	Blerim Džemaili	4	0	0	0	0	0	4	0	0
12	MF	(Italy)	Lorenzo Crisetig	4	0	0	0	0	0	4	0	0
16	MF	(Italy)	Andrea Poli	8	1	0	1	0	0	9	1	0
21	MF	(Uruguay)	César Falletti	1	0	0	0	0	0	1	0	0
77	MF	(Ghana)	Godfred Donsah	3	0	0	0	0	0	3	0	0
7	FW	(Croatia)	Bruno Petković	3	0	0	0	0	0	3	0	0
9	FW	(Italy)	Simone Verdi	2	0	0	0	0	1	2	0	1
10	FW	(Italy)	Mattia Destro	3	0	0	0	0	0	3	0	0
14	FW	(Italy)	Federico Di Francesco	4	0	0	0	0	0	4	0	0
19	FW	(Uruguay)	Felipe Avenatti	1	0	0	0	0	0	1	0	0
24	FW	(Argentina)	Rodrigo Palacio	9	0	0	0	0	0	9	0	0
30	FW	(Nigeria)	Orji Okwonkwo	2	0	0	0	0	0	2	0	0
Totals				88	4	2	3	0	1	91	4	3

Last updated: 20 May 2018
