= Nehuén Paz =

Argentine footballer

Personal information
- Full name: Nehuén Mario Paz
- Date of birth: 28 April 1993 (age 33)
- Place of birth: Buenos Aires, Argentina
- Height: 1.91 m (6 ft 3 in)
- Position: Centre-back

Team information
- Current team: Banfield (on loan from Huracán)

Senior career*
Years	Team	Apps	(Gls)
2013–2015	All Boys	35	(0)
2015–2018	Newell's Old Boys	54	(2)
2018–2021	Bologna	11	(1)
2018	→ Lanús (loan)	3	(0)
2020	→ Lecce (loan)	13	(0)
2021	→ Kayserispor (loan)	12	(1)
2021–2022	Crotone	13	(0)
2022–2023	Universidad Católica	8	(0)
2022	→ Estudiantes (loan)	7	(0)
2024	Independiente Rivadavia	1	(0)
2024–2025	Tigre	37	(3)
2025–	Huracán	16	(0)
2026–	→ Banfield (loan)	2	(0)
- * Club domestic league appearances and goals as of 17:53, 8 November 2026 (UTC)

Nehuén Mario Paz (born 28 September 1993) is an Argentine professional footballer who plays for Banfield, on loan from Huracán as a centre-back.

== Career ==
Paz's career began in 2013 with All Boys in the Argentine Primera División. He made his professional debut at the Estadio Monumental Antonio Vespucio Liberti during a defeat to River Plate on 22 September, which was the first of nineteen appearances throughout the 2013–14 season which ended with relegation. In Primera B Nacional, Paz featured sixteen times and was subsequently signed at the end of the 2014 campaign by Primera División team Newell's Old Boys. He scored his first career goal in his second start for the club, netting the opening goal in a 2–0 win against Godoy Cruz on 21 April 2015.

He remained with Newell's Old Boys for four seasons, scoring twice in fifty-seven appearances in all competitions between 2015 and 2018. On 30 January 2018, Paz joined Italian Serie A side Bologna. On 4 February, Paz was loaned back to Argentina to play for Lanús. His first appearance arrived in a 2–1 Copa Sudamericana defeat to Sporting Cristal on 7 March, which preceded a further three matches for them. He returned to Bologna for the next season and a half, as he made his club debut during a two-goal loss away to Juventus on 26 September 2018.

On 31 January 2020, after six appearances for his parent club, Paz joined fellow Serie A team Lecce on loan; purchase option included. After debuting in 4–0 victory over Torino on 2 February, the defender appeared twelve further times as they suffered relegation to Serie B. Paz then went back to Bologna, subsequently featuring for the club across the first half of 2020–21; notably scoring his first goal in the process, as he netted in a home draw with Atalanta on 23 December. On 1 February 2021, Turkish Süper Lig side Kayserispor announced the loan acquisition of Paz; until the succeeding June.

On 27 August 2021, Paz signed a two-year contract with Serie B club Crotone. On 19 February 2022, the contract was terminated by mutual consent.

On 23 February 2022, Paz signed a four-year contract with Universidad Católica in Chile. On second half 2022, he was loaned to Estudiantes de La Plata until the end of the season.

== Career statistics ==
As of match played 29 May 2022.

Club statistics
Club	Season	League			Cup		League Cup		Continental		Other		Total	
Club	Season	Division	Apps	Goals	Apps	Goals	Apps	Goals	Apps	Goals	Apps	Goals	Apps	Goals
All Boys	2013–14	Primera División	19	0	—		—		—		—		19	0
All Boys	2014	Primera B Nacional	16	0	1	0	—		—		—		17	0
All Boys	Total		35	0	1	0	—		—		0	0	36	0
Newell's Old Boys	2015	Primera División	13	1	—		—		—		1 (Note: Appearance(s) in the Primera División play-offs)	0	14	1
Newell's Old Boys	2016	Primera División	10	1	—		—		—		—		10	1
Newell's Old Boys	2016–17	Primera División	20	0	1	0	—		—		—		21	0
Newell's Old Boys	2017–18	Primera División	11	0	1	0	—		—		—		12	0
Newell's Old Boys	Total		54	2	2	0	—		0	0	1	0	57	2
Bologna	2017–18	Serie A	0	0	—		—		—		—		0	0
Bologna	2018–19	Serie A	2	0	—		—		—		—		2	0
Bologna	2019–20	Serie A	3	0	—		—		—		—		3	0
Bologna	2020–21	Serie A	6	1	1	0	—		—		—		7	1
Bologna	Total		11	1	1	0	—		—		0	0	12	1
Lanús (loan)	2017–18	Primera División	3	0	—		—		1 (Note: Appearance(s) in the Copa Sudamericana)	0	—		4	0
Lecce (loan)	2019–20	Serie A	13	0	—		—		—		—		13	0
Kayserispor (loan)	2020–21	Süper Lig	12	1	—		—		—		—		12	1
Crotone	2021-22	Serie B	13	0	1	0	—		—		—		14	0
Universidad Católica	2022	Primera División	7	0	0	0	—		4 (Note: Appearance(s) in the Copa Libertadores)	0	—		11	0
Career total			149	4	5	0	—		5	0	1	0	160	4
