= Rodrigo Palacio =

Argentine footballer (born 1982)

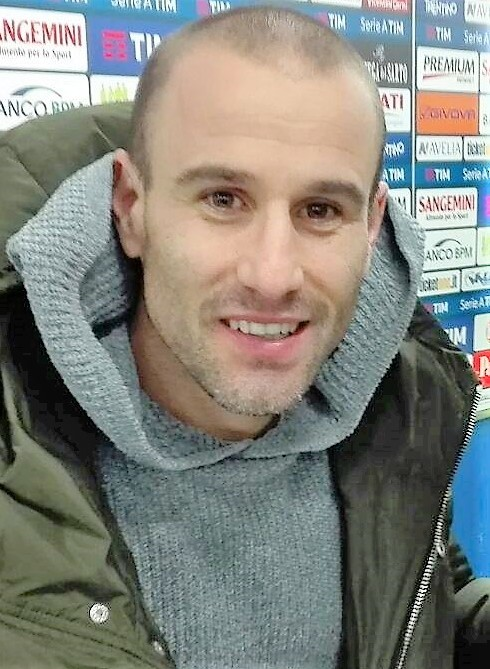
- Palacio in 2017

Personal information
- Full name: Rodrigo Sebastián Palacio Alcalde
- Date of birth: 5 February 1982 (age 44)
- Place of birth: Bahía Blanca, Argentina
- Height: 1.76 m (5 ft 9 in)
- Position: Second striker

Youth career
- 1990–2002: Bella Vista

Senior career*
Years	Team	Apps	(Gls)
2002–2004	Huracán de Tres Arroyos	53	(15)
2004–2005	Banfield	36	(9)
2005–2009	Boca Juniors	131	(54)
2009–2012	Genoa	90	(35)
2012–2017	Inter Milan	140	(39)
2017–2021	Bologna	127	(19)
2021–2022	Brescia	30	(6)
Total		607	(177)

International career
2005–2014	Argentina	27	(3)
Medal record
Representing Argentina
FIFA World Cup
Runner-up	2014 Brazil
Copa América
Runner-up	2007 Venezuela
- * Club domestic league appearances and goals

Rodrigo Palacio
No. 4 – Polisportiva Garegnano
- Position: Point guard
- League: Serie D

Personal information
- Born: 5 February 1982 (age 44) Bahía Blanca, Argentina
- Listed height: 1.76 m (5 ft 9 in)

Career information
- Playing career: 2022–present

Career history
- 2022–present: Polisportiva Garegnano

Rodrigo Sebastián Palacio Alcalde (Spanish pronunciation: [roˈðɾiɣo paˈlasjo]; born 5 February 1982) is a former professional footballer who played as a second striker. He is the son of José Ramón Palacio, a historic player of Club Olimpo during the 1980s. Palacio holds a Spanish passport, allowing him to be counted as an EU player.

At international level, Palacio has represented the Argentina national team at two FIFA World Cups and a Copa América, winning runner-up medals at the 2014 World Cup and the 2007 Copa América.

Beyond his qualities as a footballer, Palacio is also known for his rattail braid hairstyle.

== Club career ==
=== Early career ===
At age 12, he joined Bella Vista de Bahía Blanca's youth academy, and made his first team debut aged 19 in 2001, in a Torneo Argentino B (fourth division) match.

Palacio began his professional career as a 20 year old in 2002, when he signed for Huracán de Tres Arroyos of the Primera B Nacional (second division).

He made his debut on 25 August 2002, in a 2–0 victory against Juventud Antoniana. Palacio played two years for the club, and left in 2004.

=== Banfield ===
In 2004, Primera División club Banfield signed Palacio. He spent two seasons at the club, scoring 11 goals in 38 appearances.

In August 2004, he played his first match in a continental competition and scored in a 1–1 draw against Arsenal de Sarandí as part of the 2004 Copa Sudamericana. He scored in the second leg as well, but Banfield lost the match 4–3 and were eliminated.

=== Boca Juniors ===
In January 2005, Palacio completed a transfer to Boca Juniors shortly before the 2005 Clausura began. He scored his first goal for the club on 18 January, in a 2–0 victory against Independiente.

In the 2005 Copa Sudamericana, Palacio scored a hat trick in the quarter finals against Sport Club Internacional on 10 November 2005, which ended in a 4–1 for CABJ. He also scored the opening goal in the first leg of the finals against Pumas UNAM, contributing greatly to Boca's championship, which was eventually won on penalties. Palacio was the third top scorer with 5 goals, behind Bruno Marioni and Jorge Quinteros.

In the 2006 Recopa Sudamericana, Palacio scored two goals in the first leg and one in the second leg to help Boca beat São Paulo and win their third Recopa. On 26 April 2007, Palacio scored two goals in a 7–0 demolishing of Club Bolívar in the 2007 Copa Libertadores. On 24 May, he scored the last goal in a 2–0 win over Club Libertad in the quarter-finals. Palacio also scored the opening goal of the finals 1st leg against Grêmio, which ended in a 5–0 aggregate win for Boca (2–0 and 3–0). On 16 December, he would score an equalizer to make the score 1–1 against Milan, although the Italian side eventually won the Club World Cup final 4–2. Palacio earned the Bronze Ball trophy in the tournament, being ranked as the third best player behind Milan players Clarence Seedorf and Kaká respectively. Palacio's performance in the 2008 Copa Libertadores helped Boca avoid elimination from the group stage by scoring twice against Mexico's Atlas in a 3–0 home victory and scoring the third goal in Boca's dramatic 4–3 win against Chile's Colo-Colo. On 7 May 2008, Palacio scored the first goal in a 2–1 second-leg win against Brazilian club Cruzeiro. Boca eventually reached the semi-finals, where they would lose to Fluminense 4–1 on aggregate. Despite a minor injury that would see him sidelined for a small portion of the second half of the year, Palacio would then go on to win the Recopa Sudamericana against Arsenal de Sarandí, scoring one goal in the first leg and another goal in the second leg. He later won the 2008–09 Torneo Apertura after the title had to be fought out between the top three teams that were equal on points, Boca, San Lorenzo and Tigre. The championship play-offs were all held at Racing Club's stadium in a round-robin format and were held in December 2008. Palacio would score in a 3–1 win against San Lorenzo to help claim the title.

=== Genoa ===
In July 2009, Palacio signed a contract with Italian club Genoa. His debut in Serie A was on 23 August, in a 3–2 win over Roma. On 5 November, he scored his first goal for the club in the UEFA Europa League match against Lille, which ended in a 3–2 victory for Genoa. In Serie A, the striker scored his first goal against Parma, the team in which he also scored a double against in the return leg, a 3–2 away win. 2 years after his debut, Palacio also entered in Coppa Italia statistics with a brace in a 4–3 win against AG Nocerina. In the last two weeks of January 2012, Palacio scored two braces: one in a 5–3 loss against Palermo, and the other in a 3–2 win against Napoli. On his last appearance for Genoa, the hundredth overall, he received a red card against Udinese.

=== Inter Milan ===
On 22 May 2012, Genoa president Enrico Preziosi confirmed that Palacio would join Inter for the 2012–13 season. On 7 June, he was officially sold to Inter for €10.5 million, signing a three-year contract paying the player €2.7 million per year.

==== 2012–13 season ====
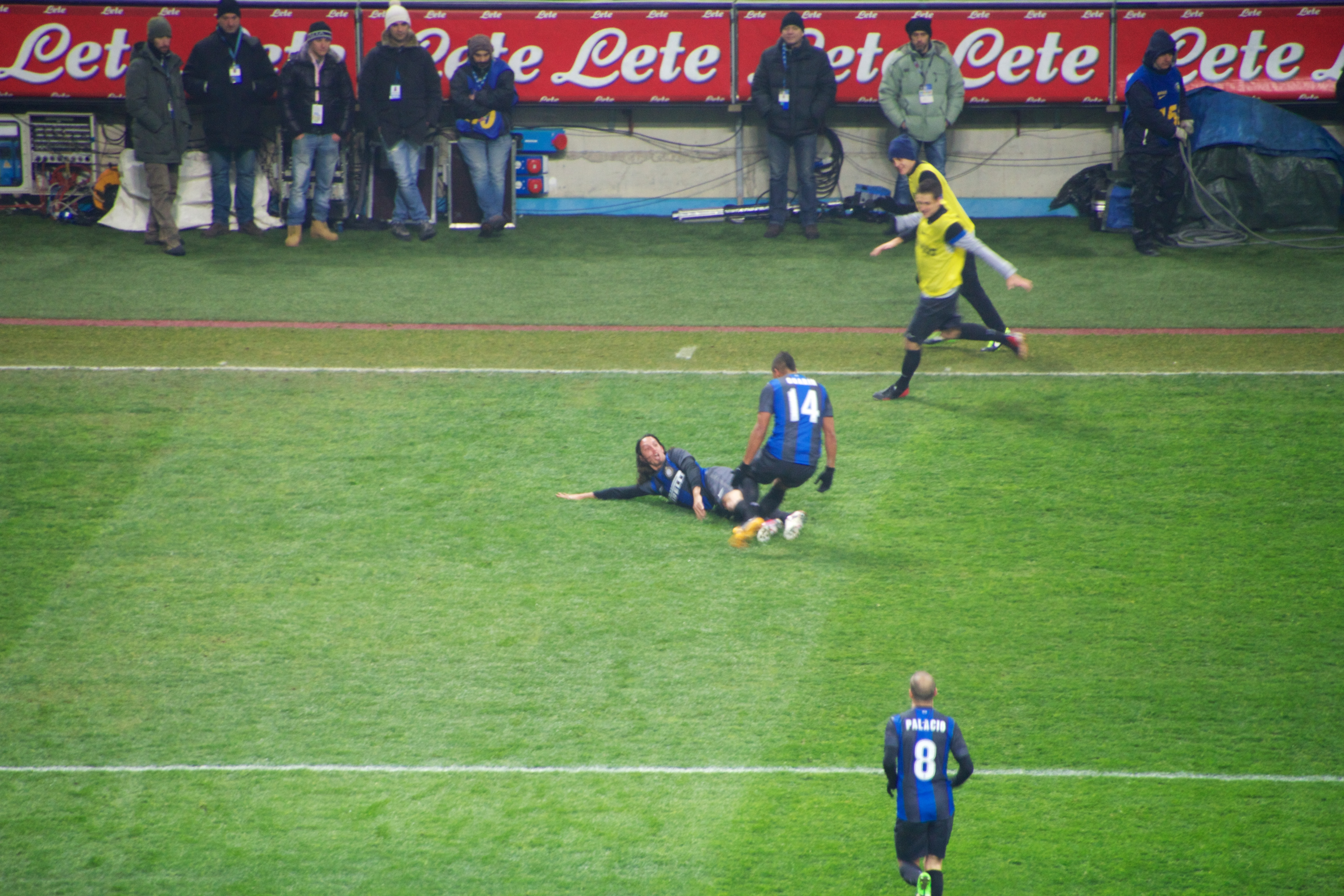
Palacio celebrating with Ezequiel Schelotto.

Palacio debuted in a UEFA Europa League qualification match against Croatian side Hajduk Split. He scored his first Inter double in a friendly against Bizertin of Tunisia on 18 August. He then scored his first official goal for Inter on 23 August in the play-off round of Europa League qualifiers against Romania's Vaslui. He scored again in the return leg in Milan on 30 August, making the final score 1–1 as Inter progressed to the competition's group stage.

He scored his first goal in Serie A for Inter on 21 October in a 2–0 victory at the San Siro against Catania. On 4 November, he scored the final goal in a 1–3 win against defending league champions Juventus, which ended the Bianconeri's 49 game-winning streak. On 8 November, he scored a brace in a Europa League match against Partizan (1–3) that took Inter into the competition's round of 32 with two group stage matches to spare. During a second round match in the Coppa Italia against Hellas Verona on 18 December, after an injury to goalkeeper Luca Castellazzi and after all three of the club's substitutions were exhausted, Palacio, wearing Vid Belec's jersey number 27, was put into goal for the final 15 minutes of the match. He did not concede any goals in a 2–0 win and even made a fine save in the 91st minute, stopping a diving header from Verona midfielder Alessandro Carrozza.

On 14 February 2013, in a match against Romanian side CFR Cluj in the first leg of the Europa League Round of 16, Palacio was substituted in seven minutes into the game after a season-ending injury to starter Diego Milito. Palacio came on and finished the game with both goals scored in a 2–0 victory. On 3 March, against Catania, Palacio was substituted in at the beginning of the second half at a time when the Nerazzurri were down 2–0. Palacio went on to provide an assist for Ricky Álvarez's goal, then scored twice himself, leading Inter to a 2–3 comeback victory. On 3 April, Palacio scored his second double of the league season against Sampdoria, raising his tally to 12 goals scored; in the same game, however, he strained his left hamstring, ultimately ending his season prematurely.

==== 2013–14 season ====
In the first fixture of the season, Palacio scored a brace against Cittadella in the third round of the Coppa Italia.

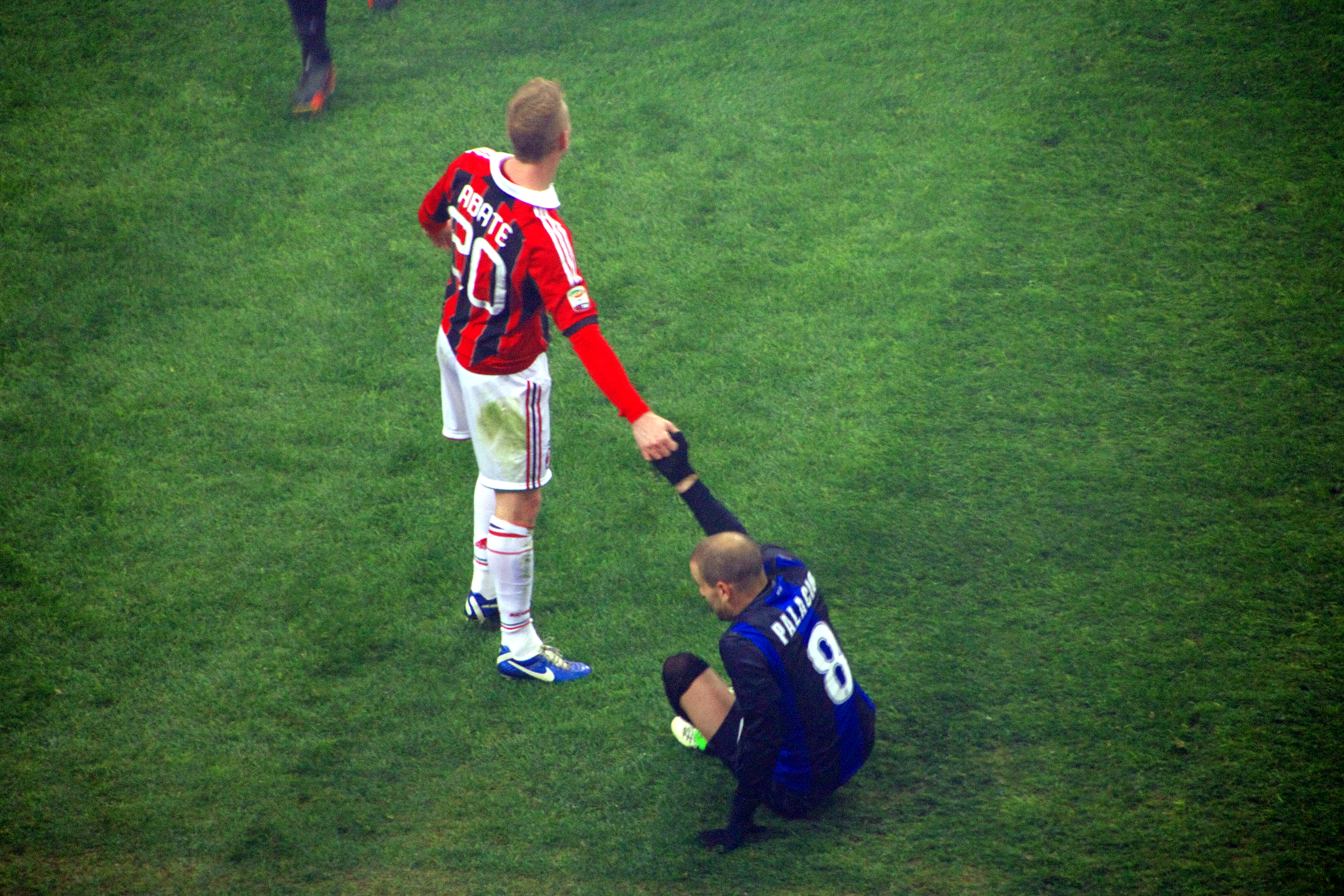
Palacio with Ignazio Abate in the Milan derby

He also scored in the first league game of the season, against Genoa on 25 August; his goal came in injury time, giving Inter a 2–0 win, which was followed by another goal and an assist in a 3–0 win against Catania. On 20 October, Palacio scored twice to give Inter a 3–3 draw against Torino at the Stadio Olimpico, and six days later scored in a 4–2 triumph against recently promoted Hellas Verona at San Siro. On 3 November, Palacio continued his fine form, scoring a header and assisting in a 0–3 away win against Udinese at the Stadio Friuli. On 22 December, he scored a superb goal in the 86th minute with the back of his heel after an assist from Fredy Guarín, which proved to be decisive with Inter winning 1–0 against Milan. That was his first competitive goal in the Derby della Madonnina.

On 15 February 2014, Palacio scored his first goal of 2014 after some negative displays during the 2–1 away win against Fiorentina. On 9 March, he scored the winning goal against Torino at the San Siro, giving Nerazzurri three important points. Five days later, Palacio signed a new two-and-a-half-year contract with Inter which will keep him at the club until 2016. One day after he extended his contract, Palacio scored the opening goal and assisted Jonathan Moreira's goal in the 2–0 away win against Hellas Verona. Palacio continued with his good appearances by scoring his 15th league goal in the 4–0 thrashing of Sampdoria at the Stadio Luigi Ferraris. He also assisted both goals from Mauro Icardi.

On 10 May, in Javier Zanetti's last competitive match at the San Siro in which Inter defeated Lazio 4–1 to secure a place in Europa League play-off for next season, Palacio scored a brace and in both occasions went to celebrate with Zanetti. He was first assisted by Mateo Kovačić and later by Yuto Nagatomo. Palacio ended the 2013–14 season with 39 appearances (37 in Serie A) and 19 goals (17 in Serie A), finishing as Inter's top goalscorer.

==== 2014–15 season ====
Palacio missed all of the pre-season phase due to his international duties with Argentina at the 2014 World Cup. He was not called upon for the first official match of the season against Icelandic side Stjarnan in the first leg of the play-off round for the Europa League, after Inter head coach Walter Mazzarri decided to let him rest. He also did not play in the returning leg as Inter comfortably secured qualification for the group stage with an aggregate 9–0 score. After missing the opening match of the Serie A season, Palacio made his first appearance of the season on 14 September, playing the last 14 minutes of the 7–0 thrashing of Sassuolo.

On 19 February 2015, Palacio scored two goals in a 3–3 draw vs Celtic, which helped Inter qualify for the round of 16 of the Europa League. In the round of 16 against Wolfsburg, he scored both goals in Inter's 5–2 aggregate loss (3–1 and 2–1). He opened the scoring in the final game of the season, a 4–3 win against Empoli. Palacio finished behind Mauro Icardi for top scorer with 12 goals, scoring 8 in the league and 4 in the Europa League.

==== 2015–16 season ====
Palacio scored his first goal of the season on 15 December 2015 in a 3–0 win over Cagliari at the San Siro, moving Inter on from the Coppa Italia's round of 16. On 8 January 2016, he extended his contract with Inter for a further season, keeping him at the club until June 2017. He didn't score his first Serie A goal for the season until 24 January 2016, opening the scoring in a 1–1 draw against Carpi. On 2 March, in a Coppa Italia match against Juventus, Palacio missed a penalty, which contributed to Inter's elimination after tying 3–3 on aggregate and losing 3–5 on penalties. Over all it was a subpar season from him, scoring just 3 goals in 30 appearances across all competitions.

==== 2016–17 season ====
On 29 September 2016, he scored Inter's only goal in the 3–1 Europa League group stage defeat against Sparta Praha. He scored a goal against his future club Bologna to eliminate them from the Coppa Italia round of 16 with a 3–2 win on 17 January 2017. The Argentine forward played 20 games but only scored 2 goals that season; one in the Europa League, one in the Coppa Italia, and none in Serie A. With his contract lasting until the end of this season, he played his last game for Inter on 28 May 2017.

=== Bologna ===
==== 2017–18 season ====
On 17 August 2017, Palacio signed a one-year contract with Bologna.

He made his debut in a 1–1 draw vs Torino on 20 August, coming on as a substitute in the 82nd minute for Simone Verdi. He made his first full start on 10 September in a 0–3 loss against Napoli, being substituted off in the 77th minute for Bruno Petković. A week later, he scored his first goal for the club in a 1–2 loss against Fiorentina at the Stadio Renato Dall'Ara, this was also the first time he played the full 90 minutes since his arrival in the summer.

==== 2018–19 season ====
On 6 July 2018, Palacio renewed his contract, signing an additional year until 30 June 2019.

Palacio began the season with a muscle injury in training, which ruled him out for 3 weeks. He returned to the team on 21 October 2018, in a 2–2 draw against Torino, being subbed off at the 80th minute. In the next game, he scored just 2 minutes into the game in a 2–2 draw at Sassuolo. On 16 March 2019, Palacio assisted Bologna's third goal to help Bologna beat Torino 2–3 in Turin.

==== 2019–20 season ====
Palacio renewed his contract again on 4 July 2019, adding another year that will run through 30 June 2020.

Palacio kicked off the season in the Coppa Italia, scoring the last goal in a 0–3 away win at AC Pisa on 18 August 2019. On 15 September, he scored and assisted Riccardo Orsolini's winning goal in a 3–4 victory against Brescia after trailing 3–1 at half-time. On 1 February 2020, he assisted Mattia Bani's 90th-minute game winner versus Brescia, a 2–1 victory.

==== 2020–21 season ====
On 2 May 2021, Palacio, who had only scored one league goal until then, on the second matchday against Parma, then scored three goals for his first hat-trick in Serie A, including an 84th-minute equalizer to salvage a 3–3 draw with Fiorentina, and in doing so at the age of 39 years and 86 days, he not only became the oldest player to achieve this feat in Serie A, breaking the previous record held by Silvio Piola since 1950 (37 years and 51 days), but also became the oldest player to score a hat-trick in Europe's top five leagues, breaking the previous record held by La Liga's Joaquín in 2019 (38 years and 140 days). However, Palacio held the European record for only a couple of months, until December, when Jorge Molina scored a hat-trick in La Liga, aged 39 years and 241 days.

Two weeks later, on 17 May, Palacio scored his fifth league goal of the season, a late equalizer against Hellas Verona.

=== Retirement ===
On 26 September 2022, Palacio retired from professional football and started playing basketball.

== International career ==
Palacio played his first match with the Argentina national team on 8 March 2005 in a friendly match against Mexico which ended in a 1–1 draw at Los Angeles Memorial Coliseum. Later that month, on 25 March, he played his first competitive match, a 2–1 away victory in a 2006 FIFA World Cup qualifier against Bolivia, with Palacio playing the last eight minutes of the match. He was selected by the coach José Pékerman for the following year's World Cup, and was given the shirt number 14. He made his debut in the tournament, entering the pitch in the 64th minute and helping the team win the first match of Group C against the Ivory Coast in a 2–1 victory. He did not play any more matches until the end of the tournament, with Argentina being eliminated from the tournament in the quarter-finals after losing 4–2 on penalties (1–1 in extra time) against Germany.

Under new Argentina coach Alfio Basile, Palacio was selected for the 2007 Copa América and given the shirt number 7. He played his first match of the tournament in the team's last match in Group C against Paraguay, starting and playing 90 minutes in a 1–0 victory at the Estadio Metropolitano de Cabudare. Argentina finished as group winners, beating the United States, Colombia and Paraguay. He made his second appearance after playing the last 12 minutes in a 3–0 win against Mexico, securing Argentina's place in the semi-finals of the tournament. In the final, he was an unused substitute as Argentina lost 3–0 to rivals Brazil.

On 15 June 2008, more than three years after his debut with Argentina, Palacio scored his first goal for his country via equalizer in the 93rd minute in a 1–1 draw against Ecuador for the 5th round of 2010 World Cup qualification. He played only two matches in 2008, and did not play any minutes for the national team during 2009 and 2010, meaning that he was not included in the squad for the 2010 World Cup by coach Diego Maradona.

After his good form with Genoa during the second part of the 2010–11 season and first part of 2011–12, Palacio received his first call-up by new national team coach Alejandro Sabella for the 2014 World Cup qualifying match against Venezuela. On 11 October 2011, he played his first match for the national team after a three-year absence, entering the field in the final 15 minutes of a 1–0 loss against Venezuela, with defender Fernando Amorebieta scoring the only goal of the match.

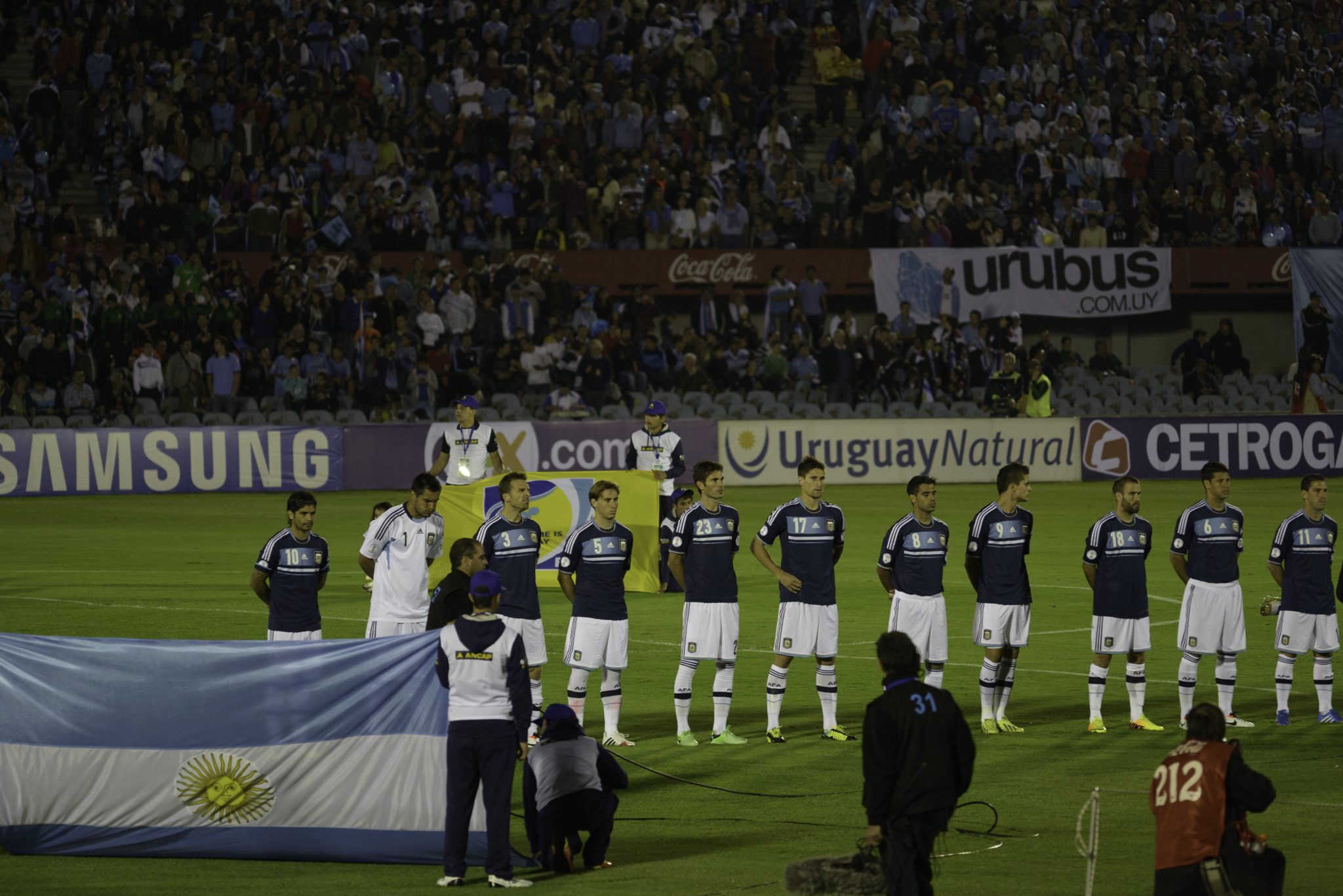
Rodrigo Palacio (number 18) lining up with Argentina against Uruguay.

After an impressive 2012–13 season with Inter, Palacio became a regular member of the Argentina national team under Sabella. During the qualifiers for the 2014 World Cup, he played eight matches and assisted several goals that helped Argentina finish first place in its group with 32 points. He scored his second goal for Argentina on 11 October 2013, scoring the third goal in the 3–1 victory against Peru in round 17 of the qualifiers.

Palacio's good form continued in 2014, scoring the opening goal of the match after a corner kick taken by Ángel Di María on 4 June in a 3–0 win against Trinidad and Tobago. Later in that match, he made a good run by dribbling the goalkeeper and assisted the third goal of the match scored by winger Ezequiel Lavezzi. After playing another friendly match against Slovenia, the team traveled to Brazil to play in the 2014 World Cup; he was included on the list of 23 players selected by coach Alejandro Sabella to participate. Notably he received a brilliant opportunity to score in the final against Germany during the 7th minute of extra time, when he received an exceptional pass from Marcos Rojo and controlled it with his chest, which left him one-on-one with the keeper, but his attempt to lob the ball over Manuel Neuer missed the goal completely. After the match, a phrase that said "Era por abajo, Palacio" (It was through the bottom, Palacio) became viral.

On 8 September 2014, at the age of 32, Palacio retired from international football, saying that there are better players to take his spot on the national team.

== Personal life ==
Palacio has a daughter. His father, José Ramón Palacio, was also a footballer.

== Style of play ==
Palacio is known to be an intelligent and technically skilled player with versatility across forward positions. Throughout his career, he has been deployed in several offensive positions, including as a striker, as a second striker, and as a winger. He is also known for his defensive work-rate.

== Career statistics ==
=== Club ===
Appearances and goals by club, season and competition
Club	Season	League			National cup (Note: Includes Coppa Italia)		Continental		Other		Total	
Club	Season	Division	Apps	Goals	Apps	Goals	Apps	Goals	Apps	Goals	Apps	Goals
Huracán	2002–03	Primera B Nacional	34	7	—		—		—		34	7
Huracán	2003–04	Primera B Nacional	19	8	—		—		—		19	8
Huracán	Total		53	15	—		—		—		53	15
Banfield	2003–04	Argentine Primera División	19	2	—		2 (Note: Appearances in Copa Sudamericana)	2	—		21	4
Banfield	2004–05	Argentine Primera División	17	7	—		—		—		17	7
Banfield	Total		36	9	—		2	2	—		38	11
Boca Juniors	2004–05	Argentine Primera División	15	3	—		7 (Note: Appearances in Copa Libertadores)	2	—		22	5
Boca Juniors	2005–06	Argentine Primera División	32	17	—		7	5	2 (Note: Appearances in Recopa Sudamericana)	0	41	22
Boca Juniors	2006–07	Argentine Primera División	33	19	—		12 (Note: Ten appearances and four goals in Copa Libertadores, two appearances and two goals in Copa Sudamericana)	6	2	3	47	28
Boca Juniors	2007–08	Argentine Primera División	31	10	—		13 (Note: Twelve appearances and four goals in Copa Libertadores, one appearance in Copa Sudamericana)	4	2 (Note: Appearances in FIFA Club World Cup)	1	46	15
Boca Juniors	2008–09	Argentine Primera División	20	5	—		7	5	2	2	29	12
Boca Juniors	Total		131	54	—		46	22	8	6	185	82
Genoa	2009–10	Serie A	31	7	0	0	6 (Note: Appearances in UEFA Europa League)	1	—		37	8
Genoa	2010–11	Serie A	27	9	2	0	—		—		29	9
Genoa	2011–12	Serie A	32	19	2	2	—		—		34	21
Genoa	Total		90	35	4	2	6	1	—		100	38
Inter Milan	2012–13	Serie A	26	12	3	2	10	8	—		39	22
Inter Milan	2013–14	Serie A	37	17	2	2	—		—		39	19
Inter Milan	2014–15	Serie A	35	8	0	0	6	4	—		41	12
Inter Milan	2015–16	Serie A	27	2	3	1	—		—		30	3
Inter Milan	2016–17	Serie A	15	0	2	1	3	1	—		20	2
Inter Milan	Total		140	39	10	6	19	13	—		169	58
Bologna	2017–18	Serie A	28	4	0	0	—		—		28	4
Bologna	2018–19	Serie A	28	3	3	0	—		—		31	3
Bologna	2019–20	Serie A	35	7	1	1	—		—		36	8
Bologna	2020–21	Serie A	36	5	1	0	—		—		37	5
Bologna	Total		127	19	5	1	—		—		132	20
Brescia	2021–22	Serie B	30	6	0	0	—		3 (Note: Appearances in Serie B promotion play-offs)	0	33	6
Career total			607	177	19	9	73	38	11	6	710	230

=== International ===
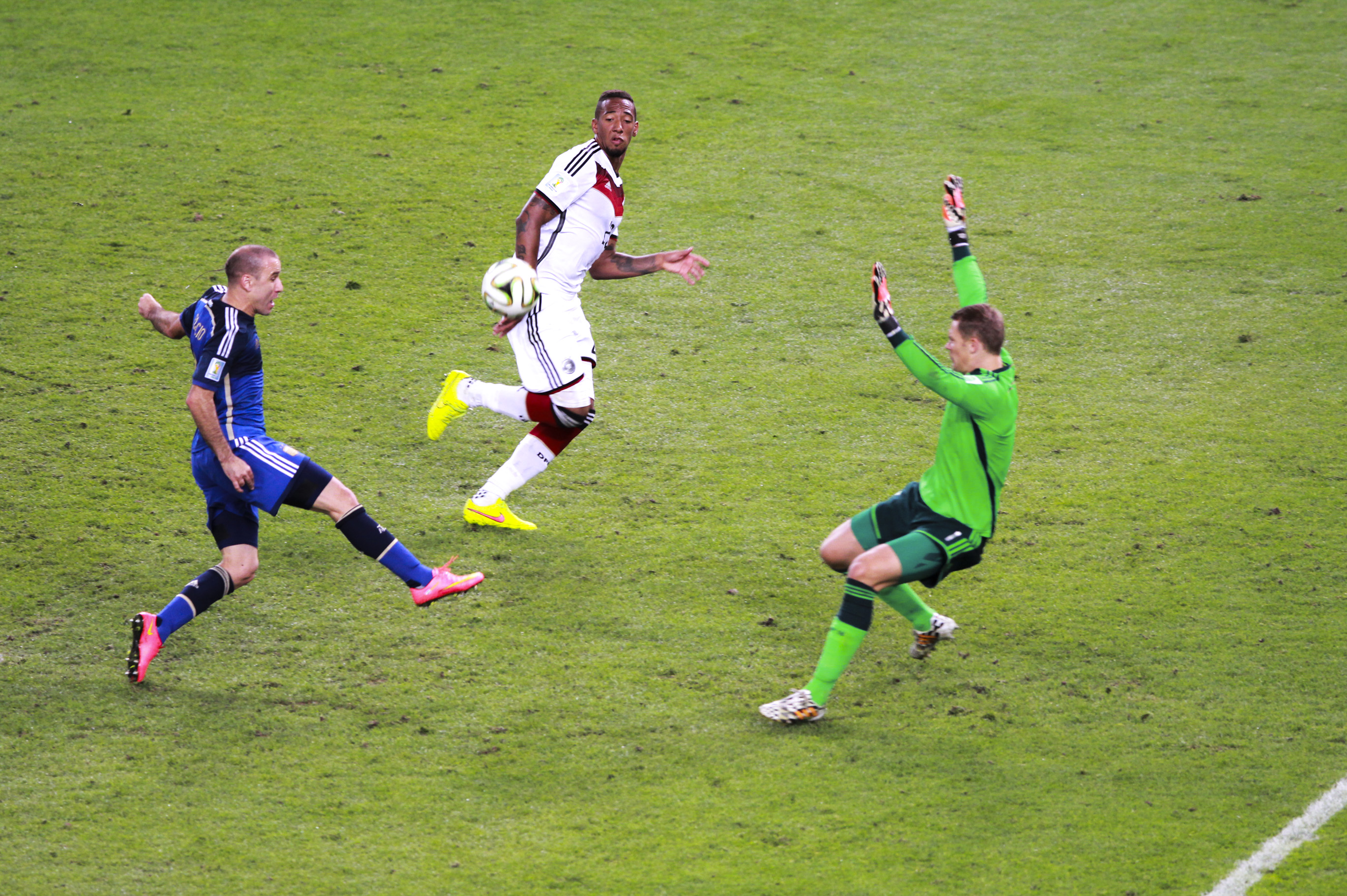
Rodrigo Palacio at the 2014 FIFA World Cup Final against Germany.

Appearances and goals by national team and year
National team	Year	Apps	Goals
Argentina	2005	2	0
Argentina	2006	1	0
Argentina	2007	3	0
Argentina	2008	2	1
Argentina	2009	0	0
Argentina	2010	0	0
Argentina	2011	1	0
Argentina	2012	1	0
Argentina	2013	10	1
Argentina	2014	7	1
Total		27	3

Scores and results list Argentina's goal tally first, score column indicates score after each Palacio goal.

List of international goals scored by Rodrigo Palacio
No.	Date	Venue	Opponent	Score	Result	Competition
1	15 June 2008	Estadio Monumental, Buenos Aires, Argentina	Ecuador	1–1	1–1	2010 FIFA World Cup qualification
2	11 October 2013	Estadio Monumental, Buenos Aires, Argentina	Peru	3–1	3–1	2014 FIFA World Cup qualification
3	4 June 2014	Estadio Monumental, Buenos Aires, Argentina	Trinidad and Tobago	1–0	3–0	Friendly

== Honours ==
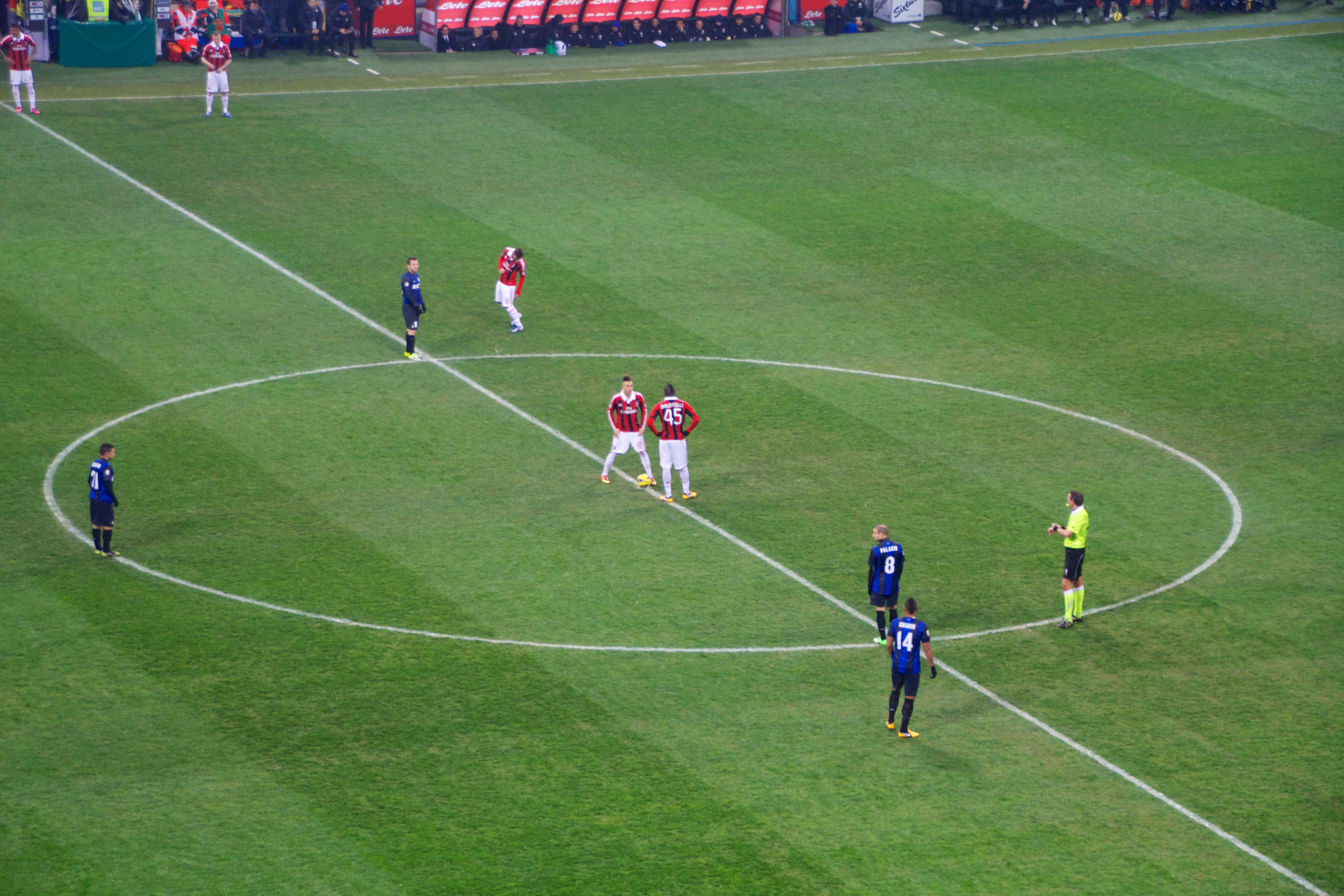
Rodrigo Palacio playing for Inter.

Boca Juniors

- Primera División: 2005 Apertura, 2006 Clausura, 2008 Apertura
- Copa Libertadores: 2007
- Copa Sudamericana: 2005
- Recopa Sudamericana: 2005, 2006, 2008
- FIFA Club World Cup runner-up: 2007

Argentina

- FIFA World Cup runner-up: 2014
- Copa América runner-up: 2007

Individual

- South American Team of the Year: 2005, 2006
- Primera División top scorer: 2006 Apertura
- FIFA Club World Cup: Bronze Ball 2007
