= Orji Okwonkwo =

Nigerian footballer (born 1998)

Personal information
- Date of birth: 19 January 1998 (age 28)
- Place of birth: Benin City, Nigeria
- Height: 5 ft 8 in (1.73 m)
- Position: Striker

Youth career
- FC Abuja Academy

Senior career*
Years	Team	Apps	(Gls)
2016–2026	Bologna	27	(3)
2018	→ Brescia (loan)	13	(1)
2019	→ Montreal Impact (loan)	28	(8)
2020	→ Montreal Impact (loan)	15	(1)
2021	→ Reggina (loan)	12	(0)
2021–2022	→ Cittadella (loan)	20	(7)
2024–2025	→ Reggiana (loan)	15	(0)
2025	→ Cittadella (loan)	16	(3)
2025–2026	→ Pescara (loan)	10	(0)

International career^{‡}
- Nigeria U17
- * Club domestic league appearances and goals as of 8 May 2026 ‡ National team caps and goals as of 06:08, 20 July 2018 (UTC)

Orji Okwonkwo (born 19 January 1998) is a Nigerian professional footballer who plays as a striker.

== Club career ==
He signed for Bologna in August 2016. On 20 November 2016, Okwonkwo made his debut in Serie A with Bologna in a victory against Palermo. On 24 September 2017, Okwonkwo scored his first Serie A goal against Sassuolo.

On 31 January 2018, Okwonkwo signed a loan contract with Brescia until 30 June 2018.

On 12 February 2019, Okwonkwo signed a loan contract with the Montreal Impact until 31 December 2019. On 24 January 2020, Montreal Impact re-acquired Okwonkwo on a loan with a purchase option at the end of the 2020 season. He said he was looking forward to working with manager Thierry Henry.

On 1 February 2021, Okwonkwo moved to Serie B side Reggina, on a loan deal until the end of the season.

On 24 July 2021 he joined Cittadella on loan.

On 20 June 2022, NADO Italia sanctioned Okwonkwo with a footballing ban until 24 February 2026, after Okwonkwo tested positive for the steroid clostebol during his loan spell at Cittadella. On 17 September 2022, FIFA's disciplinary committee extended the NADO Italia sanctions to have worldwide effect. The ban was later reduced by two years, until 24 February 2024.

On 1 February 2024, Okwonkwo was loaned by Reggiana. On 16 January 2025, he moved on a new loan, returning to Cittadella. On 1 September 2025, he joined Pescara on loan.

== International career ==
Okwonkwo represented Nigeria under-17 at the 2015 FIFA U-17 World Cup, winning the tournament.

== Career statistics ==
As of 25 October 2019

Appearances and goals by club, season and competition
Club	Season	League			National Cup		Other		Total	
Club	Season	Division	Apps	Goals	Apps	Goals	Apps	Goals	Apps	Goals
Bologna	2016–17	Serie A	9	0	2	0	0	0	11	0
Bologna	2017–18	Serie A	10	3	0	0	0	0	10	3
Bologna	2018–19	Serie A	8	0	1	0	0	0	9	0
Bologna	Total		27	3	3	0	0	0	30	3
Brescia (loan)	2017–18	Serie B	13	1	0	0	0	0	13	1
Montreal Impact (loan)	2019	MLS	28	8	0	0	0	0	28	8
Career total			68	12	3	0	0	0	71	12

== Honours ==
Montreal Impact

- Canadian Championship: 2019

Nigeria U17

- FIFA U-17 World Cup: 2015
