= Sebastien De Maio =

French footballer (born 1987)

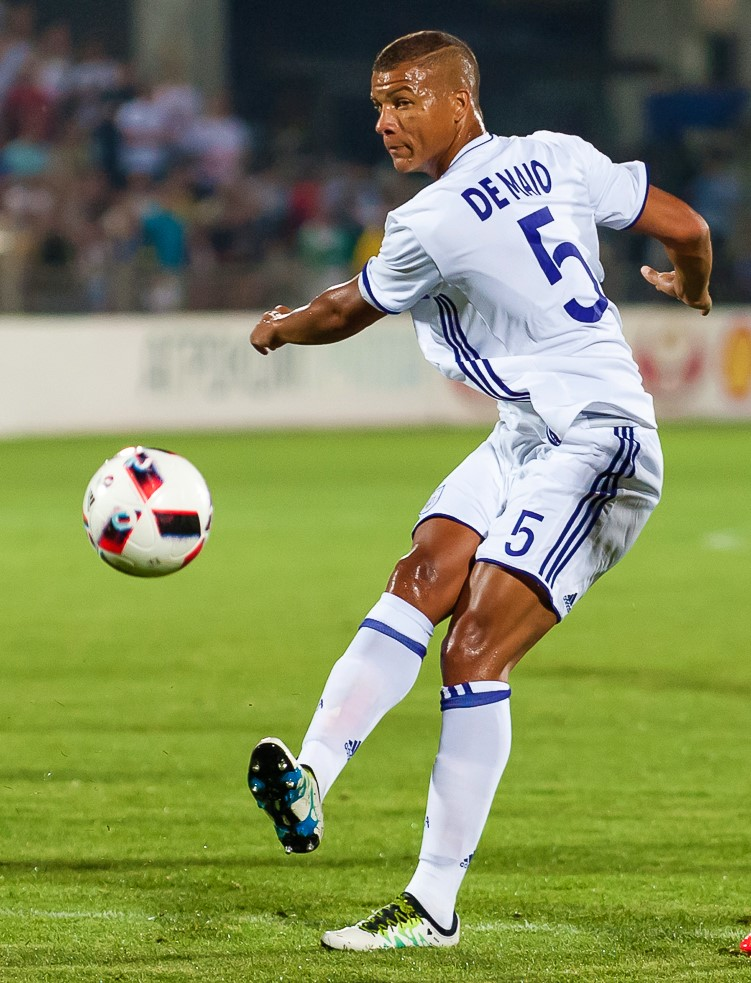
- De Maio with Anderlecht in 2016

Personal information
- Full name: Sebastien De Maio
- Date of birth: 5 March 1987 (age 39)
- Place of birth: Saint-Denis, France
- Height: 1.90 m (6 ft 3 in)
- Position: Centre-back

Youth career
- 2004–2005: Louhans-Cuiseaux
- 2005–2006: Nancy

Senior career*
Years	Team	Apps	(Gls)
2006–2013	Brescia	113	(4)
2007–2009	→ Celano (loan)	44	(6)
2010–2011	→ Frosinone (loan)	18	(1)
2013–2016	Genoa	84	(4)
2016–2017	Anderlecht	2	(0)
2016–2017	→ Fiorentina (loan)	6	(0)
2017–2019	Bologna	32	(2)
2019	→ Udinese (loan)	16	(1)
2019–2022	Udinese	38	(0)
2022–2024	Vicenza	24	(1)
2022–2023	→ Modena (loan)	10	(0)
2024–2025	Mantova	20	(0)
- * Club domestic league appearances and goals as of 18 May 2025

Sebastien De Maio (born 5 March 1987) is a French professional footballer who plays as a centre-back. Aside from France, he has played in Italy and Belgium.

== Career ==
Born in Saint-Denis, De Maio grew up in Nancy youth team, and in the summer of 2006, he was acquired by Brescia. He made his professional debut on 17 June 2007, in a 2–0 defeat to Rimini.

On 24 January 2019, De Maio joined Udinese on loan from Bologna for the rest of the season. Udinese confirmed on 29 May 2019, that they had redeemed the player and he would remain at the club, penning a new three-year contract with the club.

On 13 January 2022, he moved to Serie B club Vicenza on a 2.5-year contract. On 28 July 2022, De Maio was loaned to Modena, with an option to buy.

== Personal life ==
Born in France, De Maio is of Caribbean descent through his father, and Italian descent through his maternal grandfather from Salerno.

== Career statistics ==
As of 2 June 2024

Appearances and goals by club, season and competition
Club	Season	League			National Cup		Continental		Other		Total	
Club	Season	Division	Apps	Goals	Apps	Goals	Apps	Goals	Apps	Goals	Apps	Goals
Brescia	2006–07	Serie B	1	0	0	0	—		—		1	0
Brescia	2008–09	Serie B	3	0	1	0	—		—		4	0
Brescia	2009–10	Serie B	30	0	2	0	—		1	0	33	0
Brescia	2010–11	Serie A	2	0	2	0	—		—		4	0
Brescia	2011–12	Serie B	39	1	2	1	—		—		41	2
Brescia	2012–13	Serie B	38	3	1	0	—		2	0	41	3
Brescia	Total		113	4	8	1	—		3	0	124	5
Frosinone (loan)	2010–11	Serie B	18	1	0	0	—		—		18	1
Genoa	2013–14	Serie A	23	2	0	0	—		—		23	2
Genoa	2014–15	Serie A	33	1	2	0	—		—		35	1
Genoa	2015–16	Serie A	28	1	0	0	—		—		28	1
Genoa	Total		84	4	2	0	—		—		86	4
Anderlecht	2016–17	Belgian Pro League	2	0	0	0	2 (Note: Appearances in UEFA Champions League)	0	—		4	0
Fiorentina (loan)	2016–17	Serie A	6	0	1	0	2 (Note: Appearances in UEFA Europa League)	0	—		9	0
Bologna	2017–18	Serie A	26	2	1	0	—		—		27	2
Bologna	2018–19	Serie A	6	0	0	0	—		—		6	0
Bologna	Total		32	2	1	0	—		—		33	2
Udinese (loan)	2018–19	Serie A	16	1	0	0	—		—		16	1
Udinese	2019–20	Serie A	21	0	1	1	—		—		22	1
Udinese	2020–21	Serie A	15	0	1	0	—		—		16	0
Udinese	2021–22	Serie A	2	0	2	1	—		—		4	1
Udinese	Total		54	1	4	2	—		—		58	2
Vicenza	2021–22	Serie B	20	1	—		—		2	0	22	1
Vicenza	2023–24	Serie C	4	0	2	0	—		—		6	0
Vicenza	Total		24	1	2	0	—		2	0	28	1
Modena (loan)	2022–23	Serie B	10	0	2	0	—		—		12	0
Mantova	2023–24	Serie C	6	0	0	0	—		0	0	6	0
Career total			349	13	20	3	4	0	5	0	378	16
