= Juan Manuel Valencia =

Colombian footballer (born 1998)

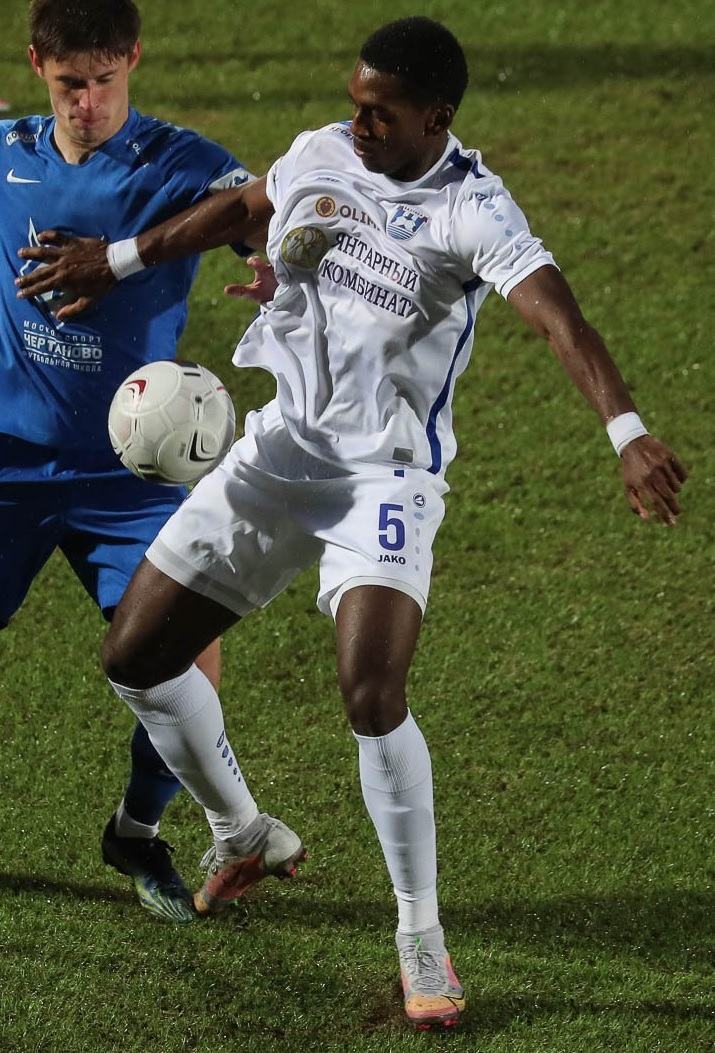
- Valencia with Baltika Kaliningrad in 2021

Personal information
- Full name: Juan Manuel Valencia Aponzá
- Date of birth: 20 June 1998 (age 28)
- Place of birth: Suarez, Colombia
- Height: 1.86 m (6 ft 1 in)
- Position: Midfielder

Team information
- Current team: Bologna FC

Youth career
- –2016: Cortuluá
- 2017: Juventus
- 2017: → Bologna (loan)

Senior career*
Years	Team	Apps	(Gls)
2016–2017	Cortuluá	9	(0)
2017–2021	Bologna	1	(0)
2019	→ Cesena (loan)	10	(0)
2020	→ Reggiana (loan)	4	(0)
2020–2021	→ Baltika Kaliningrad (loan)	11	(0)
2022	Cortuluá	23	(1)
2023	Deportes Tolima	8	(0)
- * Club domestic league appearances and goals as of 19:17, 17 July 2023 (UTC)

Juan Manuel Valencia Aponzá (born 20 June 1998) is a Colombian footballer who plays as a midfielder.

== Club career ==
Valencia debuted for Cortuluá in the Categoría Primera A in 2016 after coming through their youth academy, before transferring to Bologna in January 2017.

On 12 July 2019, Valencia joined Cesena on loan until 30 June 2020.

On 14 October 2020, he moved to Baltika Kaliningrad on loan.

== Career statistics ==
As of 26 May 2024

Club	Season	League			Cup		Continental		Total	
Club	Season	Division	Apps	Goals	Apps	Goals	Apps	Goals	Apps	Goals
Cortuluá	2016	Categoría Primera A	7	0	2	0	—		9	0
Bologna	2016-17	Serie A	0	0	—		—		0	0
Bologna	2017-18	Serie A	0	0	0	0	—		0	0
Bologna	2018-19	Serie A	1	0	0	0	—		1	0
Bologna	Total		1	0	0	0	—		1	0
Cesena (loan)	2019-20	Serie C	9	0	—		—		9	0
Reggiana (loan)	2019-20	Serie C	4	0	—		—		4	0
Baltika Kaliningrad (loan)	2020-21	Russian First League	11	0	—		—		11	0
Cortuluá	2022	Categoría Primera A	23	1	2	0	—		25	1
Deportes Tolima	2023	Categoría Primera A	8	0	—		2 (Note: Appearance(s) in Copa Sudamericana)	0	10	0
Deportivo Cali	2024	Categoría Primera A	10	0	—		—		10	0
Career Total			73	1	4	0	2	0	79	1
