= Simone Verdi =

Italian footballer (born 1992)

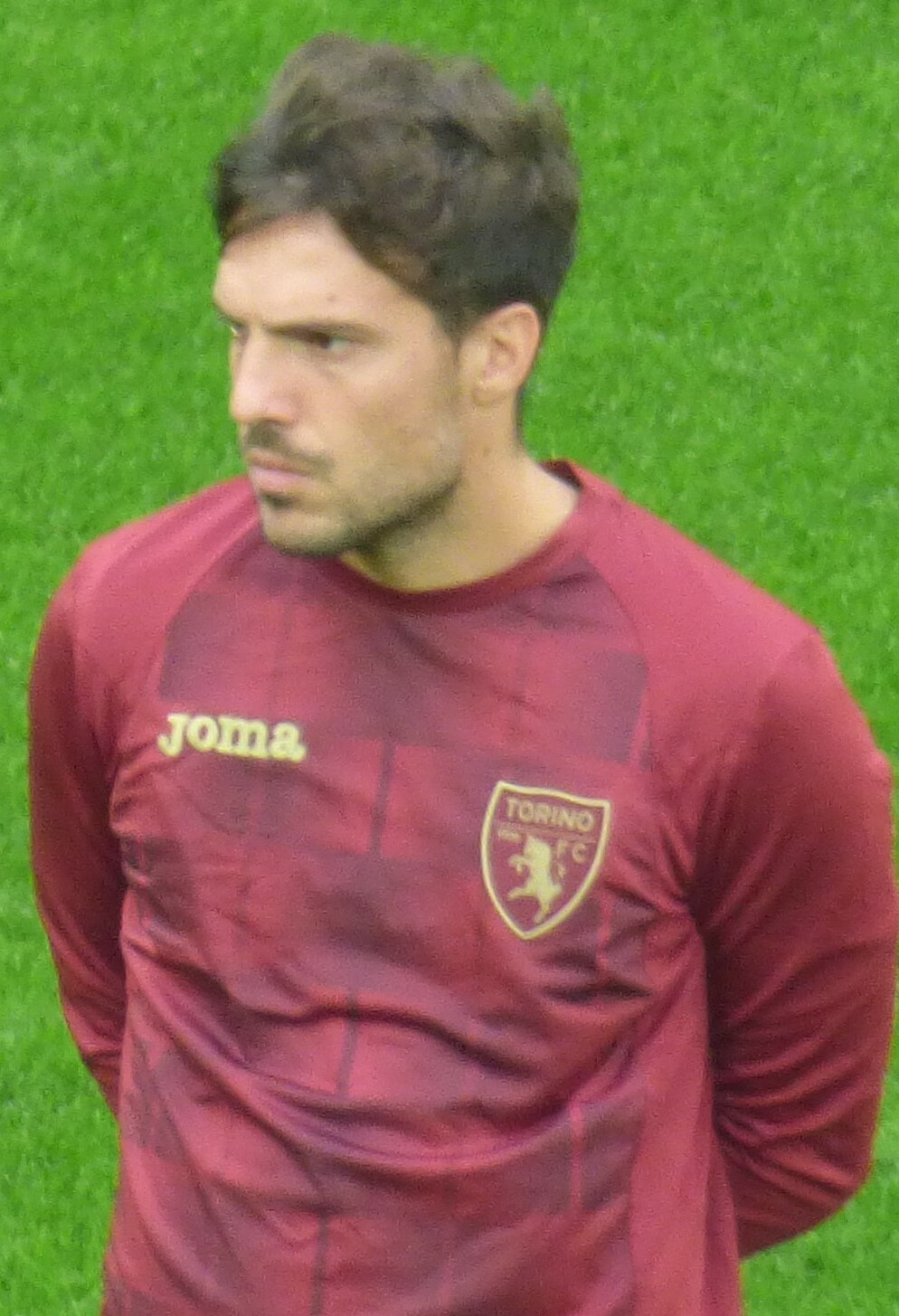
- Verdi with Torino in 2023

Personal information
- Date of birth: 12 July 1992 (age 34)
- Place of birth: Broni, Italy
- Height: 1.74 m (5 ft 9 in)
- Position: Attacking midfielder

Team information
- Current team: Benevento
- Number: 90

Youth career
- 1998–2003: Audax Travacò
- 2003–2011: AC Milan

Senior career*
| Years | Team | Apps | (Gls) |
| 2010–2011 | AC Milan | 0 | (0) |
| 2011–2015 | Torino | 16 | (0) |
| 2013 | → Juve Stabia (loan) | 20 | (0) |
| 2013–2015 | → Empoli (loan) | 66 | (6) |
| 2015–2016 | AC Milan | 0 | (0) |
| 2015–2016 | → Eibar (loan) | 9 | (0) |
| 2016 | → Carpi (loan) | 8 | (3) |
| 2016–2018 | Bologna | 62 | (16) |
| 2018–2020 | Napoli | 22 | (3) |
| 2019–2020 | → Torino (loan) | 33 | (2) |
| 2020–2023 | Torino | 37 | (2) |
| 2022 | → Salernitana (loan) | 15 | (5) |
| 2022–2023 | → Hellas Verona (loan) | 25 | (5) |
| 2023–2026 | Como | 43 | (8) |
| 2025 | → Sassuolo (loan) | 9 | (2) |
| 2026 | Südtirol | 11 | (0) |
| 2026– | Benevento | 0 | (0) |

International career
| 2010–2011 | Italy U19 | 8 | (2) |
| 2014–2015 | Italy U21 | 5 | (1) |
| 2017–2018 | Italy | 4 | (0) |
- * Club domestic league appearances and goals as of 22 August 2026

Simone Verdi (Italian pronunciation: [siˈmoːne ˈverdi]; born 12 July 1992) is an Italian professional footballer who plays as an attacking midfielder for Serie B club Benevento.

== Club career ==
=== Early career ===
Verdi started playing football with amateur club Audax Travacò, before joining Milan at the age of 11.

He made his professional debut for the club, aged 17, in a Coppa Italia game against Novara, on 13 January 2010. He then made his second appearance two weeks later, in the quarter-final against Udinese, which Milan lost 0–1. While playing for the under-20 squad, the young striker scored his first goal at the San Siro in the return leg of the Primavera Cup final, on 14 April 2010. Milan went on to win the match 2–0, as Verdi also made an assist, and secured the trophy 3–1 on aggregate. Here, he was nicknamed Verdinho, as his playing style resembled that of a Brazilian.

In May 2010, Milan CEO Adriano Galliani announced that Verdi, along with three other teammates, was expected to join the senior team permanently for the 2010–11 season. Subsequently, Verdi signed his first professional contract with the club. However, he continued playing mainly in the youth team.

=== Torino ===
At the beginning of the 2011–12 season, Verdi transferred to Serie B club Torino in a co-ownership deal for €2.5 million (exchanged with Gianmario Comi and €150,000 cash). He made his official debut for the club in the first league game of the season, a 2–1 away win against Ascoli on 27 August 2011. He played 12 games in Serie B in the 2011–12 season with Torino, which finished in 2nd place and gained promotion to Serie A.

In 2012–13, he played 4 games in Serie A, making his official debut on 30 September 2012 as a substitute against Atalanta.

==== Loans to Juve Stabia and Empoli ====
On 23 January 2013, he was loaned to Juve Stabia of Serie B for the remainder of the season. In the summer of 2013 the co-ownership agreement between Milan and Torino was renewed for an additional year.

For 2013–14, he was loaned to Empoli, in Serie B. He played his first match for the Azzurri during the second round of Coppa Italia; won 5–1 against Südtirol, in which he also scored his first goal. On 23 November 2013, he scored his first goal in Serie B, a 3–1 in a win away at Spezia. He closed the season with 5 goals in 39 appearances, contributing to the promotion in Serie A of the Tuscans.

On 18 June 2014, the co-ownership between Torino and Milan was renewed for a third year, with Verdi loaned to Empoli again. He scored his first goal in Serie A on 7 December 2014, the momentary advantage away to Napoli, finishing 2–2. On 20 January 2015 he scored his first goal in Coppa Italia against A.S. Roma, lost in extra time.

=== Return to Milan ===
In June 2015, Milan and Torino could not agree on a co-ownership deal. Verdi's future was determined by a blind auction which Milan won. On 14 July 2015, he played in a pre-season friendly against Legnano and scored one goal.

==== Loans to Eibar and Carpi ====
For the 2015–16 season he was loaned to SD Eibar with the Basque side having an option to buy.

On 29 January 2016, Verdi was loaned to Carpi on a six-month deal.

=== Bologna ===
On 11 July 2016, Bologna completed the signing of Verdi. During the first part of the season he had a strong impact with 4 goals in 9 games.

He signed a new four-year contract on 13 June 2017. On 4 November 2017, he scored two times from 25-meter free kicks in a home game against Crotone, first time with his left and next time with his right foot.

On 21 January Verdi was made captain of Bologna following his decision to decline a move to Napoli in the transfer window. His side beat Benevento 3–0 at the Stadio Renato Dall'Ara.

=== Napoli ===
On 11 June 2018, Verdi signed a five-year contract with Napoli for €25 million.

=== Return to Torino ===
On 2 September 2019, during the final minutes of the summer transfer window, Verdi was loaned to Torino for €3 million with an obligation to purchase of €20 million.

==== Loans to Salernitana and Hellas Verona ====
On 28 January 2022, he joined Salernitana on loan.

On 1 September 2022, Verdi moved to Hellas Verona on loan with an option to buy and a conditional obligation to buy.

=== Como ===
On 25 August 2023, Verdi signed a contract with Como for two seasons, with an option for a third.

==== Loan to Sassuolo ====
On 3 February 2025, Verdi moved to Sassuolo in Serie B on loan.

=== Südtirol ===
On 2 January 2026, Verdi signed a six-months contract with Südtirol.

== International career ==
On 22 September 2010, he was called up to the Italy under-19 to play a game against the Serbia under-19.

On 31 May 2014, he was called up to the Italy under-21 side for which he made his debut on 4 June in the 4–0 friendly win over Montenegro.

On 28 March 2017, Verdi made his senior international debut for the Italy national football team, along with four other players, coming on as a substitute in a 2–1 friendly away win against the Netherlands.

== Style of play ==
A dynamic and versatile forward or attacking midfielder, Verdi can adapt to any offensive midfield role, both in the centre or on either wing, due to his ambidexterity, although his favoured role is on the right flank; he is also capable of playing as a second striker. He is mainly noted for his dribbling ability, technique and remarkable speed on the ball, as well as his ability to create chances for teammates; he is also capable of finding spaces and make attacking runs from behind. In the 2016–17 Serie A season he was also noted for his shooting power and ability to score goals from long range, including free kicks. During his militancy in Napoli, he had declared that he was a natural left.

== Career statistics ==
=== Club ===
As of match played 25 April 2025

Appearances and goals by club, season and competition
| Club | Season | League | | | National cup | | Europe | | Other | | Total | |
| Club | Season | Division | Apps | Goals | Apps | Goals | Apps | Goals | Apps | Goals | Apps | Goals |
|---|---|---|---|---|---|---|---|---|---|---|---|---|
| AC Milan | 2009–10 | Serie A | 0 | 0 | 2 | 0 | 0 | 0 | — | | 2 | 0 |
| AC Milan | 2010–11 | Serie A | 0 | 0 | 0 | 0 | 0 | 0 | — | | 0 | 0 |
| AC Milan | Total | | 0 | 0 | 2 | 0 | 0 | 0 | — | | 2 | 0 |
| Torino | 2011–12 | Serie B | 12 | 0 | 1 | 0 | — | | — | | 13 | 0 |
| Torino | 2012–13 | Serie A | 4 | 0 | 2 | 0 | — | | — | | 6 | 0 |
| Torino | Total | | 16 | 0 | 3 | 0 | — | | — | | 19 | 0 |
| Juve Stabia (loan) | 2012–13 | Serie B | 20 | 0 | — | | — | | — | | 20 | 0 |
| Empoli (loan) | 2013–14 | Serie B | 40 | 5 | 2 | 1 | — | | — | | 42 | 6 |
| Empoli (loan) | 2014–15 | Serie A | 26 | 1 | 2 | 2 | — | | — | | 28 | 3 |
| Empoli (loan) | Total | | 66 | 6 | 4 | 3 | — | | — | | 70 | 9 |
| Eibar (loan) | 2015–16 | La Liga | 9 | 0 | 4 | 1 | — | | — | | 13 | 1 |
| Carpi (loan) | 2015–16 | Serie A | 8 | 3 | — | | — | | — | | 8 | 3 |
| Bologna | 2016–17 | Serie A | 28 | 6 | 1 | 0 | — | | — | | 29 | 6 |
| Bologna | 2017–18 | Serie A | 34 | 10 | 1 | 0 | — | | — | | 35 | 10 |
| Bologna | Total | | 62 | 16 | 2 | 0 | — | | — | | 64 | 16 |
| Napoli | 2018–19 | Serie A | 22 | 3 | 0 | 0 | 2 | 1 | — | | 24 | 4 |
| Torino (loan) | 2019–20 | Serie A | 33 | 2 | 1 | 0 | — | | — | | 34 | 2 |
| Torino | 2020–21 | Serie A | 33 | 1 | 1 | 2 | — | | — | | 34 | 3 |
| Torino | 2021–22 | Serie A | 3 | 1 | 1 | 0 | — | | — | | 4 | 1 |
| Torino | 2023–24 | Serie A | 1 | 0 | 1 | 0 | — | | — | | 2 | 0 |
| Torino | Total | | 70 | 4 | 4 | 2 | — | | — | | 74 | 6 |
| Salernitana (loan) | 2021–22 | Serie A | 15 | 5 | — | | — | | — | | 15 | 5 |
| Hellas Verona (loan) | 2022–23 | Serie A | 24 | 5 | 0 | 0 | — | | — | | 24 | 5 |
| Como | 2023–24 | Serie B | 34 | 8 | 0 | 0 | — | | — | | 34 | 8 |
| Como | 2024–25 | Serie A | 9 | 0 | 1 | 0 | — | | — | | 10 | 0 |
| Como | Total | | 43 | 8 | 1 | 0 | — | | — | | 44 | 8 |
| Sassuolo (loan) | 2024–25 | Serie B | 6 | 1 | 0 | 0 | — | | — | | 6 | 1 |
| Career total | | | 361 | 51 | 20 | 6 | 2 | 1 | 0 | 0 | 383 | 58 |

=== International ===
As of 4 June 2018

Italy
| Year | Apps | Goals |
|---|---|---|
| 2017 | 2 | 0 |
| 2018 | 2 | 0 |
| Total | 4 | 0 |

== Honours ==
AC Milan

- Serie A: 2010–11

Sassuolo

- Serie B: 2024–25
