= Antonio Santurro =

Dominican footballer (born 1992)

Personal information
- Full name: Antonio Santurro Bueno
- Date of birth: 29 February 1992 (age 34)
- Place of birth: Parma, Italy
- Height: 1.92 m (6 ft 4 in)
- Position: Goalkeeper

Youth career
- Parma

Senior career*
Years	Team	Apps	(Gls)
2011–2014	Parma	0	(0)
2011–2012	→ Bagnolese (loan)	33	(0)
2012–2014	→ Renate (loan)	41	(0)
2014–2015	Savoia	18	(0)
2015	→ Juve Stabia (loan)	0	(0)
2015–2016	Melfi	32	(0)
2016–2017	Siracusa	37	(0)
2017–2021	Bologna	1	(0)
2019–2020	→ Sambenedettese (loan)	17	(0)
2020–2021	→ Catania (loan)	1	(0)
2021–2022	Udinese	0	(0)
2022–2023	Parma	0	(0)

International career^{‡}
2022–	Dominican Republic	5	(0)
- * Club domestic league appearances and goals as of 22 May 2022 ‡ National team caps and goals as of 6 June 2022

Antonio Santurro Bueno (born 29 February 1992) is a professional footballer who plays as a goalkeeper. Born in Italy, he plays for the Dominican Republic national team.

== Club career ==
Born in Parma, Emilia-Romagna region to a father from Frosinone and a Dominican mother, Santurro started his career at the youth teams of Parma F.C. He was a player for their U-16 team in Emilia-Romagna's "Allievi" League in 2007–08 season. He played six games in Campionato Nazionale Primavera (Italian under-20 league) from 2009 to 2011 for Parma's reserves. In 2011 he was transferred to Serie D club Bagnolese.

In 2012 he was signed by Lega Pro Seconda Divisione club Renate on loan. In 2013 the contract was extended. In 2014 he left for Lega Pro club Savoia. Circa January 2015 he was loaned to Juve Stabia.

In 2015 he was signed by Melfi. In 2016 he left for another third-tier club Siracusa. The club entered the promotion play-off in 2017, losing to Casertana in the first stage. He was the starting keeper of the team, only missing once due to suspension.

On 11 July 2017, Santurro was signed by Serie A club Bologna. He was recommended by Luca Bucci, goalkeeping coach of Bologna and former coach of Parma youth team. He made his debut for Bologna at home against Roma on 31 March 2018.

On 8 July 2019, Santurro joined to Sambenedettese on loan until 30 June 2020.

On 18 September 2020, he went to Catania on loan.

On 3 October 2021. he went to Udinese.

On 1 November 2022, Santurro returned to Parma.

== International career ==
On 20 May 2022, Santurro received his first call up to the Dominican Republic national football team. He debuted with the Dominican Republic in a 3–2 CONCACAF Nations League loss to French Guiana on 5 June 2022, coming on as a substitute in the 67th minute.

== Personal life ==
He has a twin brother Riccardo, a former youth footballer of Inter Club Parma and Vicenza Calcio. Due to his Dominican background, his favorite music genres are reggaeton and bachata.
