= César Falletti =

Uruguayan footballer (born 1992)

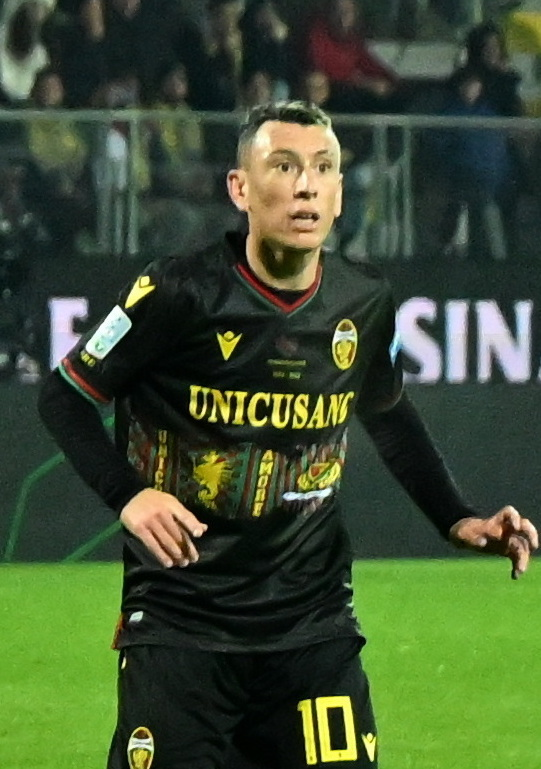
- Falletti in 2022 playing for Ternana

Personal information
- Full name: César Alejandro Falletti dos Santos
- Date of birth: 2 December 1992 (age 33)
- Place of birth: Artigas, Uruguay
- Height: 1.70 m (5 ft 7 in)
- Position: Midfielder

Youth career
- Juventud
- Cerro

Senior career*
Years	Team	Apps	(Gls)
2012–2013	Cerro	39	(5)
2013–2017	Ternana	125	(18)
2017	Luqueño	0	(0)
2017–2022	Bologna	13	(1)
2018–2019	→ Palermo (loan)	32	(4)
2019–2020	→ Tijuana (loan)	8	(0)
2020–2022	→ Ternana (loan)	52	(25)
2022–2024	Ternana	51	(4)
2024–2025	Cremonese	17	(1)
2024–2025	→ Bari (loan)	27	(1)
2025–2026	Mantova	19	(0)
- * Club domestic league appearances and goals as of 13 May 2026

César Alejandro Falletti dos Santos (born 2 December 1992) is an Uruguayan professional footballer who plays as a midfielder.

== Career ==
He started his career with C.A. Cerro.

In August 2013, he joined Serie B side Ternana alongside his fellow countryman Felipe Avenatti.

He remained in Terni for 4 years, and after the difficulties of the first two seasons, he delivered his best performance in the last two; notably, the third one with the Umbrian side in 2015–16, where he scored 10 goals.

On 23 July 2017, Falletti signed for Serie A side Bologna and once again linked up with Avenatti. He scored his first goal on 24 February 2018, in a 2–0 home win against Genoa. He did not feature regularly because of injuries.

On 13 August 2018, he went on loan to Serie B's Palermo.

On 27 August 2019, Falletti joined Liga MX club Tijuana.

On 14 September 2020, he signed a four-year contract with Ternana. The first two seasons of the contract were a loan from Bologna, with an obligation from Ternana to purchase his rights in 2022.

On 9 January 2024, Falletti signed a contract with Cremonese until 30 June 2026.

Falletti went on loan to Bari for the 2024–25 season on 30 August 2024.

On 10 July 2025, he moved to Mantova on a two-season deal.

== Personal life ==
Falletti is of Italian descent and he holds Italian citizenship.

== Career statistics ==
As of match played 9 February 2019

Appearances and goals by club, season and competition
Club	Season	League			National Cup		Continental		Other		Total	
Club	Season	Division	Apps	Goals	Apps	Goals	Apps	Goals	Apps	Goals	Apps	Goals
Cerro	2011–12	Primera División	9	1	0	0	—		—		9	1
Cerro	2012–13	Primera División	30	4	0	0	—		—		30	4
Cerro	Total		39	5	0	0	0	0	0	0	39	5
Ternana	2013–14	Serie B	24	0	0	0	—		—		24	0
Ternana	2014–15	Serie B	20	0	1	0	—		—		21	0
Ternana	2015–16	Serie B	40	10	2	0	—		—		42	10
Ternana	2016–17	Serie B	40	7	1	0	—		—		41	7
Ternana	Total		124	17	4	0	0	0	0	0	128	17
Bologna	2017–18	Serie A	13	1	0	0	—		—		13	1
Palermo (loan)	2018–19	Serie B	21	3	0	0	—		—		21	3
Tijuana	Clausura 2019	Liga MX	0	0	0	0	—		—		0	0
Career total			197	26	4	0	0	0	0	0	201	26
