= 2016–17 Bologna FC 1909 season =

Bologna
2016–17 season
- President: Joey Saputo
- Manager: Roberto Donadoni
- Stadium: Stadio Renato Dall'Ara
- Serie A: 15th
- Coppa Italia: Round of 16
- Top goalscorer: League: Mattia Destro (11); All: Mattia Destro (11)
- Highest home attendance: 29,233 vs Juventus (28 May 2017, Serie A)
- Lowest home attendance: 7,956 vs Hellas Verona (1 December 2016, Coppa Italia)
- Average home league attendance: 21,189
Home colours	Away colours	Third colours

The 2016–17 season was Bologna Football Club 1909's second season back in Serie A, after the club's relegation at the end of the 2013–14 season.

== Season review ==
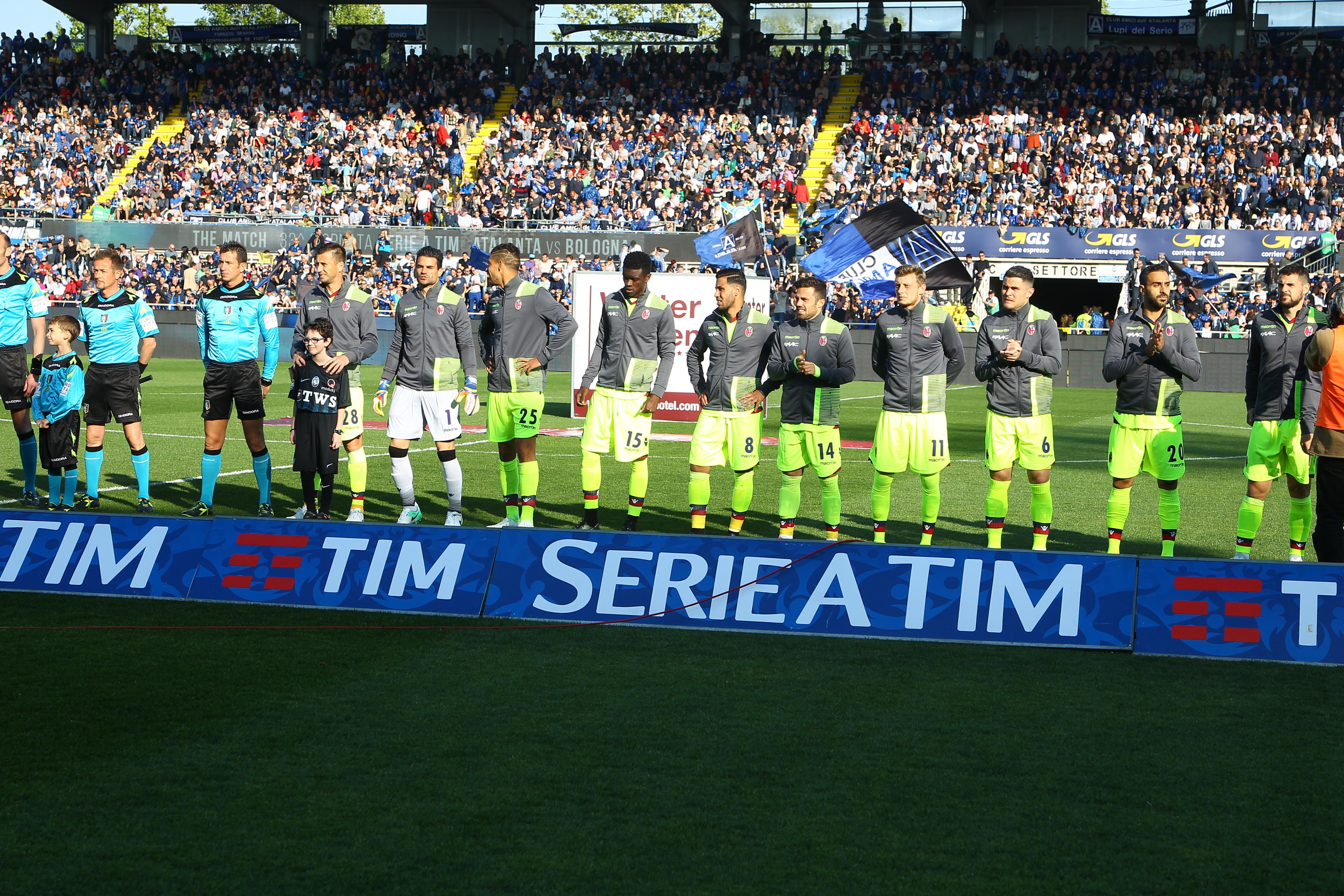
2016–17 Bologna team

The club competed in Serie A, finishing 15th, and in the Coppa Italia, where they were eliminated in the round of 16.

== Players ==
=== Squad information ===
As of 27 January 2017

Note: Flags indicate national team as defined under FIFA eligibility rules; some limited exceptions apply. Players may hold more than one non-FIFA nationality.

No.	Pos.	Nation	Player
1	GK	BRA	Angelo da Costa
2	DF	GRE	Marios Oikonomou
4	DF	SWE	Emil Krafth
5	MF	CHI	Erick Pulgar
6	MF	ITA	Federico Viviani (on loan from Verona)
8	MF	ALG	Saphir Taïder
9	FW	ITA	Simone Verdi
10	FW	ITA	Mattia Destro
11	FW	CZE	Ladislav Krejčí
12	MF	COL	Juan Manuel Valencia ^{U21} (on loan from Juventus)
14	FW	ITA	Federico Di Francesco
15	DF	SEN	Ibrahima Mbaye
16	MF	HUN	Ádám Nagy ^{U21}

No.	Pos.	Nation	Player
17	MF	GHA	Godfred Donsah ^{U21}
18	DF	SWE	Filip Helander
19	FW	NGA	Umar Sadiq ^{U21} (on loan from Roma)
20	DF	ITA	Domenico Maietta
21	FW	CRO	Bruno Petković
22	MF	ITA	Luca Rizzo
25	DF	ITA	Adam Masina ^{CT}
28	DF	ITA	Daniele Gastaldello
30	FW	NGA	Orji Okwonkwo ^{U21}
31	MF	SUI	Blerim Džemaili
35	DF	GRE	Vasilis Torosidis
83	GK	ITA	Antonio Mirante
97	GK	SEN	Mouhamadou Fallou Sarr ^{U21}

Lega Serie A had limited the squad to the maximum of 25 players, including at least 4 home grown players and 4 additional club-trained players (marked as ^{CT}). However, under-21 players (born 1995 or after in this season; marked as ^{U21}) were not limited. Mirante was left out from the squad list due to injury from September to 20 November, plus one unknown player was not registered (Acquafresca according to report), making Bologna squad was composite of 23 players that over 21 of age, including 2 players trained by Bologna, from September 2016 to January 2017. Bologna reinstated Mirante by replacing Gomis in November, thanks to a clause in the regulation that allow to swap goalkeeper even out of transfer window, which Gomis replaced Mirante again in Italian Cup once. After the winter transfer window Bologna squad was trimmed to 20 players plus 6 Under-21 players.

== Transfers ==
=== In ===
Date	Pos.	Player	Age	Moving from	Fee	Notes	Source
16 May 2016		(Italy) Aaron Tabacchi	17	(Italy) Chievo	Undisclosed	reserve team	
27 June 2016	MF	(Italy) Federico Di Francesco	22	(Italy) Virtus Lanciano	Undisclosed		
27 June 2016	DF	(Romania) Deian Boldor	21	(Italy) Virtus Lanciano	Undisclosed		
1 July 2016	MF	(Italy) Luca Rizzo	24	(Italy) Sampdoria	Undisclosed	obligation in the loan contract	
7 July 2016	MF	(Czech Republic) Ladislav Krejčí	24	(Czech Republic) Sparta Prague	Undisclosed		
11 July 2016	FW	(Italy) Simone Verdi	23	(Italy) Milan	Undisclosed		
14 July 2016	MF	(Hungary) Ádám Nagy	21	(Hungary) Ferencváros	Undisclosed		
17 August 2016	MF	(Switzerland) Blerim Džemaili	30	(Turkey) Galatasaray	€1.3M		
31 August 2016	DF	(Greece) Vasilis Torosidis	31	(Italy) Roma	Undisclosed		
31 August 2016	MF	(Italy) Lorenzo Crisetig	23	(Italy) Internazionale	Undisclosed	early excised on an obligation	
		Bruno Petković					

==== Loans in ====
Date	Pos.	Player	Age	Moving from	Fee	Notes	Source
4 July 2016	DF	(Italy) Fabrizio Brignani	18	(Italy) Cremonese		reserve team; loan renewal	
31 August 2016	GK	(Italy) Alfred Gomis		(Italy) Torino			
31 August 2016		(Nigeria) Umar Sadiq		(Italy) Roma		Loan with option and counter-option	
31 August 2016		(Italy) Federico Viviani		(Italy) Hellas Verona		Loan with an option to buy	
31 August 2016		(Sweden) Filip Helander		(Italy) Hellas Verona		Loan with an obligation to buy	

=== Out ===
Date	Pos.	Player	Age	Moving to	Fee	Notes	Source
21 June 2016	MF	(Italy) Marco Crimi	26	(Italy) Carpi	Undisclosed	buy out option activated	
1 July 2016	MF	(Guinea) Kévin Constant	29	Unattached	Free	end of contract	
1 July 2016	DF	(Serbia) Uroš Radaković	22	(Czech Republic) Sigma Olomouc	Undisclosed	buy out option activated	
16 August 2016	DF	(Italy) Luca Rossettini		(Italy) Torino	Undisclosed		
26 August 2016	MF	(Guinea) Amadou Diawara		(Italy) Napoli	Undisclosed		
30 August 2016	MF	(Italy) Franco Brienza		(Italy) Bari	Undisclosed		
31 August 2016	DF	(Italy) Luca Ceccarelli		Unattached	Undisclosed	Contract terminated in mutual consent	
18 January 2017	GK	(Italy) Alfred Gomis		(Italy) Torino	Loan return		
		(Italy) Archimede Morleo					
		(Italy) Sergio Floccari					
		(Italy) Robert Acquafresca					

==== Loans out ====
Date	Pos.	Player	Age	Moving to	Fee	Notes	Source
7 July 2016		(Italy) Matteo Mancosu		(Canada) Montreal Impact		had loan return on 1 July	
13 July 2016		(Hungary) Bálint Vécsei		(Switzerland) Lugano		had loan return; with option to buy	
13 July 2016		(Italy) Filippo Falco		(Italy) Benevento		Loan return	
14 July 2016		(Italy) Filippo Perucchini		(Italy) Benevento			
16 July 2016	DF	(Italy) Lorenzo Paramatti		(Italy) Messina		Loan return	
26 August 2016	DF	(Italy) Lorenzo Paramatti		(Italy) Santarcangelo		Loan return	
30 August 2016	DF	(Romania) Deian Boldor	21	(Italy) Hellas Verona		new signing; with option and counter-option	
31 August 2016		(Italy) Nicolò Cherubin		(Italy) Hellas Verona		with obligation to buy	
31 August 2016		(Italy) Lorenzo Crisetig		(Italy) Crotone			
27 January 2017		(France) Anthony Mounier		(France) Saint-Étienne		with option and counter-option	
		(Italy) Alex Ferrari		(Italy) Hellas Verona			
30 January 2017		(Italy) Filippo Perucchini		(Italy) Lecce		Loan return	

== Pre-season and friendlies ==
16 July 2016 Friendly	Bologna	9–0	Virtus Acquaviva
	Verdi 1', 36', 39', 41'; Mbaye 35'; Brienza 46'; Floccari 56', 63'; Taïder 71'	Report		Referee: Marco Bodini

22 July 2016 Friendly	Bologna	2–1	Hapoel Haifa
	Taïder 52' (pen.); Donsah 83'	Report	Adilson 34'	Referee: Luca Detta

23 July 2016 Friendly	Bologna	0–1	Terek Grozny
		Report	Roshi 70'	Referee: Alessandro Munerati

30 July 2016 Friendly	Bologna	2–0	Al Ain
	Brienza 18'; Masina 34'	Report		Referee: Bernd Hirschbichler

2 August 2016 Friendly	Bologna	0–1	FC Köln
		Report	Heintz 84'	Referee: Walter Altmann

4 August 2016 Friendly	Bologna	1–2	Schalke 04
	Brienza 68'	Report	Di Santo 10'; Tekpetey 81'	Referee: Wolfram Auschnaiter

== Competitions ==
=== Overall ===
Competition	Started round	Current position	Final position	First match	Last match
Serie A	Matchday 1	—	15th	21 August 2016	27 May 2017
Coppa Italia	Third round	—	Round of 16	12 August 2016	17 January 2017

Last updated: 28 May 2017

=== Serie A ===
==== League table ====
Pos	Team	Pld	W	D	L	GF	GA	GD	Pts
13	Udinese	38	12	9	17	47	56	−9	45
14	Chievo	38	12	7	19	43	61	−18	43
15	Bologna	38	11	8	19	40	58	−18	41
16	Genoa	38	9	9	20	38	64	−26	36
17	Crotone	38	9	7	22	34	58	−24	34

Source: Serie A, Soccerway
Rules for classification: 1) Points; 2) Head-to-head points; 3) Head-to-head goal difference; 4) Goal difference; 5) Goals scored; 6) Draw.

==== Results summary ====
Overall								Home						Away					
Pld	W	D	L	GF	GA	GD	Pts	W	D	L	GF	GA	GD	W	D	L	GF	GA	GD
38	11	8	19	40	58	−18	41	8	2	9	24	25	−1	3	6	10	16	33	−17

Last updated: 27 May 2017.
Source: Competitive matches

==== Results by round ====
Round	1	2	3	4	5	6	7	8	9	10	11	12	13	14	15	16	17	18	19	20	21	22	23	24	25	26	27	28	29	30	31	32	33	34	35	36	37	38
Ground	H	A	H	A	H	A	H	A	H	A	H	A	H	H	A	H	A	H	A	A	H	A	H	A	H	A	H	A	H	A	H	A	A	H	A	H	A	H
Result	W	L	W	L	W	D	L	D	D	D	L	L	W	L	L	D	W	L	L	W	W	D	L	L	L	D	L	W	W	L	L	D	L	W	L	W	L	L
Position	7	14	7	13	7	8	11	12	13	13	15	15	13	14	16	16	14	15	15	15	10	13	14	14	15	15	16	14	13	14	14	14	15	15	15	15	15	15

Updated to match(es) played on 28 May 2017. Source: Competitive matches
A = Away; H = Home; W = Win; D = Draw; L = Loss

==== Matches ====
21 August 2016 1	Bologna	1–0	Crotone	Bologna
20:45 CEST (UTC+02:00)	Pulgar (yellow card) 75'; Destro 86'	Report	Rohdén (yellow card) 35'	Stadium: Stadio Renato Dall'Ara; Attendance: 18,396; Referee: Claudio Gavillucci

28 August 2016 2	Torino	5–1	Bologna	Turin
20:45 CEST (UTC+02:00)	Belotti 28', 38', 89'; Bovo (yellow card) 50'; Martínez 53'; Baselli 80'	Report	Taïder 32'; Pulgar (yellow card) 46'; Gastaldello (yellow card) 63'	Stadium: Stadio Olimpico Grande Torino; Attendance: 17,077; Referee: Gianluca Rocchi

11 September 2016 3	Bologna	2–1	Cagliari	Bologna
12:30 CEST (UTC+02:00)	Verdi 23'; Di Francesco 74'; Džemaili (yellow card) 90+3'	Report	Barella (yellow card) 21'; Ioniță (yellow card) 32'; Storari (red card) 54'; Alves 83', (yellow card) 90+5'	Stadium: Stadio Renato Dall'Ara; Attendance: 17,903; Referee: Rosario Abisso

17 September 2016 4	Napoli	3–1	Bologna	Naples
20:45 CEST (UTC+02:00)	Callejón 14'; Milik 67', 78'	Report	Taïder (yellow card) 9'; Verdi 56'; Krafth (red card) 80'	Stadium: Stadio San Paolo; Attendance: 21,083; Referee: Daniele Doveri

21 September 2016 5	Bologna	2–0	Sampdoria	Bologna
18:30 CEST (UTC+02:00)	Verdi (yellow card) 27', (goal) 45'; Destro 50'; Di Francesco (red card) 90+2'	Report	Pereira (yellow card) 67'; Barreto (red card) 69'; Praet (yellow card) 87'; Linetty (yellow card) 89'	Stadium: Stadio Renato Dall'Ara; Attendance: 16,998; Referee: Piero Giacomelli

25 September 2016 6	Internazionale	1–1	Bologna	Milan
15:00 CEST (UTC+02:00)	Perišić 37'	Report	Destro 14'; Gastaldello (yellow card) 21'; Da Costa (yellow card) 33'; Džemaili (yellow card) 39'; Pulgar (yellow card) 63'	Stadium: San Siro; Attendance: 42,274; Referee: Domenico Celi

2 October 2016 7	Bologna	0–1	Genoa	Bologna
15:00 CEST (UTC+02:00)	Gastaldello (yellow card) 43' (yellow-red card) 43'; Džemaili (red card) 87'	Report	Veloso (yellow card) 18'; Gentiletti (yellow card) 18' (yellow-red card) 85'; Rincón (yellow card) 25'; Simeone (yellow card) 43', (goal) 77'	Stadium: Stadio Renato Dall'Ara; Attendance: 18,840; Referee: Fabio Maresca

16 October 2016 8	Lazio	1–1	Bologna	Rome
15:00 CEST (UTC+02:00)	Immobile (yellow card) 10', (goal) 90+7' (pen.); Radu (yellow card) 67'; Felipe Anderson (yellow card) 84'; Wallace (yellow card) 87'	Report	Helander 10'; Di Francesco (yellow card) 37'; Masina (yellow card) 57'; Sadiq (yellow card) 90+6'	Stadium: Stadio Olimpico; Attendance: 15,000; Referee: Marco Di Bello

23 October 2016 9	Bologna	1–1	Sassuolo	Bologna
18:00 CEST (UTC+02:00)	Verdi 10'	Report	Pellegrini (yellow card) 77'; Matri 86'	Stadium: Stadio Renato Dall'Ara; Attendance: 20,201; Referee: Massimiliano Irrati

26 October 2016 10	Chievo	1–1	Bologna	Verona
20:45 CEST (UTC+02:00)	Mbaye 70' (o.g.)	Report	Pulgar 52'; Nagy (yellow card) 67'; Helander (yellow card) 83'; Verdi (yellow card) 85'; Sadiq (yellow card) 90+1'	Stadium: Stadio Marc'Antonio Bentegodi; Attendance: 9,000; Referee: Fabrizio Pasqua

29 October 2016 11	Bologna	0–1	Fiorentina	Bologna
18:00 CEST (UTC+02:00)	Mbaye (yellow card) 28'; Gastaldello (red card) 29'; Džemaili (yellow card) 74'; Masina (yellow card) 87'	Report	Kalinić 31' (pen.), (yellow card) 41'; Salcedo (yellow card) 52'; Tomović (yellow card) 90'	Stadium: Stadio Renato Dall'Ara; Attendance: 20,780; Referee: Paolo Valeri

6 November 2016 12	Roma	3–0	Bologna	Rome
20:45 CET (UTC+01:00)	Salah 13', 62', 71'; Paredes (yellow card) 64'	Report		Stadium: Stadio Olimpico; Attendance: 24,600; Referee: Piero Giacomelli

20 November 2016 13	Bologna	3–1	Palermo	Bologna
15:00 CET (UTC+01:00)	Destro 20'; Gastaldello (yellow card) 45'; Džemaili 67'; Viviani 72'	Report	Nestorovski 9'; Cionek (yellow card) 30'	Stadium: Stadio Renato Dall'Ara; Attendance: 22,027; Referee: Carmine Russo

27 November 2016 14	Bologna	0–2	Atalanta	Bologna
15:00 CET (UTC+01:00)	Gastaldello (yellow card) 36'; Viviani (yellow card) 61'; Maietta (yellow card) 74'; Masina (yellow card) 81'; Torosidis (yellow card) 89'	Report	Masiello 15'; Gagliardini (yellow card) 20'; Kessié (yellow card) 32'; Kurtić 68'	Stadium: Stadio Renato Dall'Ara; Attendance: 21,525; Referee: Maurizio Mariani

5 December 2016 15	Udinese	1–0	Bologna	Udine
21:00 CET (UTC+01:00)	Hallfreðsson (yellow card) 35'; Felipe (yellow card) 56'; Danilo (yellow card) 57', (goal) 90+3'	Report	Pulgar (yellow card) 58' (yellow-red card) 68'	Stadium: Stadio Friuli; Attendance: 16,014; Referee: Fabrizio Pasqua

11 December 2016 16	Bologna	0–0	Empoli	Bologna
15:00 CET (UTC+01:00)	Krafth (yellow card) 90+3'; Džemaili (yellow card) 90+4'	Report	Costa (yellow card) 67'; Croce (yellow card) 75'; Pasqual (yellow card) 90'; Büchel (yellow card) 90+5'	Stadium: Stadio Renato Dall'Ara; Attendance: 17,598; Referee: Marco Guida

18 December 2016 17	Pescara	0–3	Bologna	Pescara
15:00 CET (UTC+01:00)	Verre (red card) 16'; Biraghi (yellow card) 83'	Report	Masina 7'; Nagy (yellow card) 23'; Džemaili 41'; Krejčí 57' (pen.); Gastaldello (yellow card) 68'	Stadium: Stadio Adriatico – Giovanni Cornacchia; Attendance: 11,374; Referee: Gianluca Rocchi

8 January 2017 19	Juventus	3–0	Bologna	Turin
20:45 CET (UTC+01:00)	Higuaín 7', 55'; Lichtsteiner (yellow card) 17'; Dybala 41' (pen.)	Report	Torosidis (yellow card) 35'; Di Francesco (yellow card) 45+1'	Stadium: Juventus Stadium; Attendance: 38,144; Referee: Maurizio Mariani

14 January 2017 20	Crotone	0–1	Bologna	Crotone
18:00 CET (UTC+01:00)	Palladino (yellow card) 4'; Falcinelli (yellow card) 68'	Report	Gastaldello (yellow card) 41'; Džemaili 51'; Masina (yellow card) 71'; Maietta (yellow card) 76'; Nagy (yellow card) 86'	Stadium: Stadio Ezio Scida; Attendance: 7,474; Referee: Gianpaolo Calvarese

22 January 2017 21	Bologna	2–0	Torino	Bologna
15:00 CET (UTC+01:00)	Džemaili (yellow card) 38', (goal) 43', 83'; Destro (yellow card) 63'	Report	Benassi (yellow card) 45+2'; De Silvestri (yellow card) 76'	Stadium: Stadio Renato Dall'Ara; Attendance: 17,820; Referee: Davide Ghersini

28 January 2017 22	Cagliari	1–1	Bologna	Cagliari
15:00 CET (UTC+01:00)	Sau (yellow card) 6'; Tachtsidis (yellow card) 31'; Borriello 90+2'	Report	Maietta (yellow card) 13'; Donsah (yellow card) 35'; Destro 64'; Viviani (yellow card) 80' (red card) 88'; Krafth (red card) 90+1'	Stadium: Stadio Sant'Elia; Attendance: 11,114; Referee: Luca Pairetto

4 February 2017 23	Bologna	1–7	Napoli	Bologna
20:45 CET (UTC+01:00)	Pulgar (yellow card) 11'; Masina (red card) 32'; Torosidis 36'; Maietta (yellow card) 61'	Report	Hamšík 4', 70', 74'; Insigne 6'; Diawara (yellow card) 20'; Callejón (yellow card) 25' (red card) 26'; Mertens 33', 43', 90'; Hysaj (yellow card) 75'	Stadium: Stadio Renato Dall'Ara; Attendance: 23,297; Referee: Davide Massa

8 February 2017 18	Bologna	0–1	Milan	Bologna
20:45 CET (UTC+01:00)	Mbaye (yellow card) 18'; Gastaldello (yellow card) 45'; Verdi (yellow card) 47'; Nagy (yellow card) 90+2'; Džemaili (yellow card) 90+5'	Report	Paletta (yellow card) 18' (yellow-red card) 37'; Abate (yellow card) 23'; Kucka (yellow card) 53' (yellow-red card) 59'; Vangioni (yellow card) 71'; Pašalić 89'	Stadium: Stadio Renato Dall'Ara; Attendance: 23,863; Referee: Daniele Doveri

12 February 2017 24	Sampdoria	3–1	Bologna	Genoa
18:00 CET (UTC+01:00)	Schick (yellow card) 63', (goal) 83'; Torreira (yellow card) 72'; Muriel 82' (pen.); Mbaye 88' (o.g.)	Report	Maietta (yellow card) 11'; Džemaili 18', (yellow card) 90+3'; Mbaye (yellow card) 45'; Torosidis (yellow card) 81'	Stadium: Stadio Luigi Ferraris; Attendance: 17,973; Referee: Michael Fabbri

19 February 2017 25	Bologna	0–1	Internazionale	Bologna
12:30 CET (UTC+01:00)	Torosidis (yellow card) 84'	Report	Miranda (yellow card) 67'; Gabriel 81', (yellow card) 82'; D'Ambrosio (yellow card) 88'; Banega (yellow card) 90+1'	Stadium: Stadio Renato Dall'Ara; Attendance: 28,006; Referee: Paolo Mazzoleni

26 February 2017 26	Genoa	1–1	Bologna	Genoa
15:00 CET (UTC+01:00)	Cataldi (yellow card) 56'; Ntcham 90+4'	Report	Oikonomou (yellow card) 45+1'; Viviani 57'; Torosidis (red card) 75'	Stadium: Stadio Luigi Ferraris; Attendance: 18,788; Referee: Gianluca Rocchi

5 March 2017 27	Bologna	0–2	Lazio	Bologna
20:45 CET (UTC+01:00)	Maietta (yellow card) 64'; Džemaili (yellow card) 73'	Report	Immobile 9', 74'; Keita (yellow card) 73'	Stadium: Stadio Renato Dall'Ara; Attendance: 18,262; Referee: Carmine Russo

12 March 2017 28	Sassuolo	0–1	Bologna	Reggio Emilia
12:30 CET (UTC+01:00)	Cannavaro (yellow card) 25'; Berardi (yellow card) 41'; Politano (yellow card) 60'	Report	Helander (yellow card) 34'; Destro 58', (yellow card) 59'; Di Francesco (yellow card) 64'; Torosidis (yellow card) 64'; Masina (yellow card) 83'	Stadium: Mapei Stadium – Città del Tricolore; Attendance: 10,773; Referee: Paolo Valeri

19 March 2017 29	Bologna	4–1	Chievo	Bologna
15:00 CET (UTC+01:00)	Pulgar (yellow card) 25'; Maietta (yellow card) 54'; Verdi 61'; Džemaili 72', 90'; Di Francesco 90+3'	Report	Hetemaj (yellow card) 28'; Castro 40'; Spolli (yellow card) 42'; Birsa (yellow card) 64'	Stadium: Stadio Renato Dall'Ara; Attendance: 20,982; Referee: Rosario Abisso

2 April 2017 30	Fiorentina	1–0	Bologna	Florence
15:00 CEST (UTC+02:00)	Babacar 51'; Badelj (yellow card) 59'; Tomović (yellow card) 70'; Astori (yellow card) 79'	Report	Destro (yellow card) 29'; Krejčí (yellow card) 90'	Stadium: Stadio Artemio Franchi; Attendance: 27,496; Referee: Daniele Doveri

9 April 2017 31	Bologna	0–3	Roma	Bologna
15:00 CEST (UTC+02:00)	Maietta (yellow card) 69'; Džemaili (yellow card) 75'; Petković (yellow card) 84'	Report	Fazio 25'; Manolas (yellow card) 38'; Salah 41'; Strootman (yellow card) 69'; Džeko 75'	Stadium: Stadio Renato Dall'Ara; Attendance: 22,947; Referee: Antonio Damato

15 April 2017 32	Palermo	0–0	Bologna	Palermo
15:00 CEST (UTC+02:00)	Jajalo (yellow card) 27'; Cionek (yellow card) 37'; Aleesami (yellow card) 53'; Šunjić (yellow card) 75'	Report	Pulgar (red card) 25'; Verdi (yellow card) 38'; Masina (yellow card) 79'	Stadium: Stadio Renzo Barbera; Attendance: 9,915; Referee: Luca Banti

22 April 2017 33	Atalanta	3–2	Bologna	Bergamo
18:00 CEST (UTC+02:00)	Conti 3'; Freuler 14'; Caldara (yellow card) 43', (goal) 75'; Masiello (yellow card) 78'	Report	Destro 16'; Džemaili (yellow card) 44'; Gastaldello (yellow card) 51'; Mbaye (yellow card) 57'; Di Francesco 61'	Stadium: Stadio Atleti Azzurri d'Italia; Attendance: 17,528; Referee: Carmine Russo

30 April 2017 34	Bologna	4–0	Udinese	Bologna
15:00 CEST (UTC+02:00)	Destro 2', 59'; Viviani (yellow card) 26'; Taïder 45+1'; Danilo 68' (o.g.)	Report	Hallfreðsson (yellow card) 20'; Zapata (yellow card) 36'; Danilo (yellow card) 42'	Stadium: Stadio Renato Dall'Ara; Attendance: 22,360; Referee: Domenico Celi

7 May 2017 35	Empoli	3–1	Bologna	Empoli
15:00 CEST (UTC+02:00)	Croce 5'; Pasqual 38', (yellow card) 65'; Costa 46'	Report	Verdi 11'; Krejčí (yellow card) 16'; Gastaldello (yellow card) 43'	Stadium: Stadio Carlo Castellani; Attendance: 8,883; Referee: Gianpaolo Calvarese

14 May 2017 36	Bologna	3–1	Pescara	Bologna
15:00 CEST (UTC+02:00)	Destro 8', 90+1', (yellow card) 90+2'; Di Francesco 48'; Donsah (yellow card) 50'	Report	Bahebeck 24'; Bovo (yellow card) 34'; Coulibaly (yellow card) 39'	Stadium: Stadio Renato Dall'Ara; Attendance: 21,546; Referee: Antonio Di Martino

21 May 2017 37	Milan	3–0	Bologna	Milan
15:00 CEST (UTC+02:00)	Deulofeu 69', (yellow card) 70'; Honda 73'; Lapadula 90+1'; Cutrone (yellow card) 90+2'	Report	Helander (yellow card) 6'; Gastaldello (yellow card) 72'	Stadium: San Siro; Attendance: 41,054; Referee: Piero Giacomelli

27 May 2017 38	Bologna	1–2	Juventus	Bologna
18:00 CEST (UTC+02:00)	Taïder 52'; Viviani (yellow card) 65'; Okwonkwo (yellow card) 82'; Gastaldello (yellow card) 90+1'	Report	Dybala 70'; Cuadrado (yellow card) 79'; Kean 90+4'	Stadium: Stadio Renato Dall'Ara; Attendance: 29,233; Referee: Maurizio Mariani

=== Coppa Italia ===
12 August 2016 Third round	Bologna	2–0	Trapani	Bologna
21:00 CEST (UTC+02:00)	Pulgar (yellow card) 16'; Krejčí 42'; Taïder 47'	Report	Casasola (yellow card) 35'; Coronado (yellow card) 51'	Stadium: Stadio Renato Dall'Ara; Attendance: 11,841; Referee: Marco Di Bello

1 December 2016 Fourth round	Bologna	4–0	Hellas Verona	Bologna
21:00 CET (UTC+01:00)	Di Francesco 31'; Mounier 39', 86'; Okwonkwo (yellow card) 89'; Krafth 90+1'	Report	Zaccagni (yellow card) 49'; Boldor (yellow card) 88'	Stadium: Stadio Renato Dall'Ara; Attendance: 7,956; Referee: Luca Pairetto

17 January 2017 Round of 16	Internazionale	3–2 (a.e.t.)	Bologna	Milan
21:00 CET (UTC+01:00)	Murillo 34'; Palacio 39'; D'Ambrosio (yellow card) 63'; Candreva 98', (yellow card) 109'; Medel (yellow card) 105+1'	Report	Džemaili 43'; Donsah (yellow card) 52', (goal) 73'; Di Francesco (yellow card) 102'	Stadium: San Siro; Attendance: 23,478; Referee: Maurizio Mariani

== Statistics ==
=== Appearances and goals ===
No.	Pos	Nat	Player	Total		Serie A		Coppa Italia	
No.	Pos	Nat	Player	Apps	Goals	Apps	Goals	Apps	Goals
Goalkeepers
1	GK	(Brazil) BRA	Angelo da Costa	19	0	17+1	0	1	0
83	GK	(Italy) ITA	Antonio Mirante	22	0	21	0	1	0
97	GK	(Senegal) SEN	Mouhamadou Sarr	0	0	0	0	0	0
Defenders
2	DF	(Greece) GRE	Marios Oikonomou	20	0	12+6	0	2	0
4	DF	(Sweden) SWE	Emil Krafth	29	1	16+10	0	3	1
15	DF	(Senegal) SEN	Ibrahima Mbaye	17	0	11+5	0	1	0
18	DF	(Sweden) SWE	Filip Helander	11	1	9+2	1	0	0
20	DF	(Italy) ITA	Domenico Maietta	31	0	29	0	2	0
25	DF	(Italy) ITA	Adam Masina	34	1	28+4	1	2	0
28	DF	(Italy) ITA	Daniele Gastaldello	26	0	24	0	2	0
35	DF	(Greece) GRE	Vasilis Torosidis	28	1	23+5	1	0	0
Midfielders
5	MF	(Chile) CHI	Erick Pulgar	30	1	17+10	1	3	0
6	MF	(Italy) ITA	Federico Viviani	17	2	13+4	2	0	0
8	MF	(Algeria) ALG	Saphir Taïder	26	4	22+2	3	1+1	1
16	MF	(Hungary) HUN	Ádám Nagy	28	0	22+3	0	2+1	0
17	MF	(Ghana) GHA	Godfred Donsah	16	1	10+3	0	2+1	1
22	MF	(Italy) ITA	Luca Rizzo	13	0	4+8	0	1	0
31	MF	(Switzerland) SUI	Blerim Džemaili	33	9	29+2	8	1+1	1
Forwards
9	FW	(Italy) ITA	Simone Verdi	29	6	25+3	6	1	0
10	FW	(Italy) ITA	Mattia Destro	33	11	28+2	11	3	0
11	FW	(Czech Republic) CZE	Ladislav Krejčí	38	2	33+4	1	1	1
14	FW	(Italy) ITA	Federico Di Francesco	27	5	11+13	4	2+1	1
19	FW	(Nigeria) NGA	Umar Sadiq	7	0	1+6	0	0	0
21	FW	(Croatia) CRO	Bruno Petković	12	0	4+8	0	0	0
30	FW	(Nigeria) NGA	Orji Okwonkwo	11	0	1+8	0	0+2	0
98	FW	(Italy) ITA	Aaron Tabacchi	0	0	0	0	0	0
Players transferred out during the season
3	DF	(Italy) ITA	Archimede Morleo	1	0	0+1	0	0	0
7	FW	(France) FRA	Anthony Mounier	8	2	4+2	0	1+1	2
23	MF	(Italy) ITA	Franco Brienza	1	0	0	0	0+1	0
23	GK	(Senegal) SEN	Alfred Gomis	1	0	0	0	1	0
24	DF	(Italy) ITA	Alex Ferrari	1	0	1	0	0	0
26	FW	(Italy) ITA	Sergio Floccari	5	0	3+2	0	0	0

Last updated: 27 May 2017
Source: Competitions

=== Goalscorers ===
Rank	No.	Pos	Nat	Name	Serie A	Coppa Italia	Total
1	10	FW	(Italy)	Mattia Destro	11	0	11
2	31	MF	(Switzerland)	Blerim Džemaili	8	1	9
3	9	FW	(Italy)	Simone Verdi	6	0	6
4	14	FW	(Italy)	Federico Di Francesco	4	1	5
5	8	MF	(Algeria)	Saphir Taïder	3	1	4
6	6	MF	(Italy)	Federico Viviani	2	0	2
6	7	FW	(France)	Anthony Mounier	0	2	2
6	11	FW	(Czech Republic)	Ladislav Krejčí	1	1	2
9	4	DF	(Sweden)	Emil Krafth	0	1	1
9	5	MF	(Chile)	Erick Pulgar	1	0	1
9	17	MF	(Ghana)	Godfred Donsah	0	1	1
9	18	DF	(Sweden)	Filip Helander	1	0	1
9	25	DF	(Italy)	Adam Masina	1	0	1
9	35	DF	(Greece)	Vasilis Torosidis	1	0	1
Own goal					1	0	1
Totals					40	8	48

Last updated: 27 May 2017

=== Clean sheets ===
Rank	No.	Pos	Nat	Name	Serie A	Coppa Italia	Total
1	83	GK	(Italy)	Antonio Mirante	8	1	9
2	1	GK	(Brazil)	Angelo da Costa	1	0	1
2	23	GK	(Senegal)	Alfred Gomis	0	1	1
Totals					9	2	11

Last updated: 27 May 2017

=== Disciplinary record ===
No.	Pos	Nat	Player	Serie A			Coppa Italia			Total		
No.	Pos	Nat	Player	Booked	(yellow card) (yellow-red card)	Sent off (straight red)	Booked	(yellow card) (yellow-red card)	Sent off (straight red)	Booked	(yellow card) (yellow-red card)	Sent off (straight red)
1	GK	(Brazil)	Angelo da Costa	1	0	0	0	0	0	1	0	0
2	DF	(Greece)	Marios Oikonomou	1	0	0	0	0	0	1	0	0
4	DF	(Sweden)	Emil Krafth	1	0	2	0	0	0	1	0	2
15	DF	(Senegal)	Ibrahima Mbaye	4	0	0	0	0	0	4	0	0
18	DF	(Sweden)	Filip Helander	3	0	0	0	0	0	3	0	0
20	DF	(Italy)	Domenico Maietta	8	0	0	0	0	0	8	0	0
25	DF	(Italy)	Adam Masina	6	0	1	0	0	0	6	0	1
28	DF	(Italy)	Daniele Gastaldello	11	1	1	0	0	0	11	1	1
35	DF	(Greece)	Vasilis Torosidis	5	0	1	0	0	0	5	0	1
5	MF	(Chile)	Erick Pulgar	5	1	1	1	0	0	6	1	1
6	MF	(Italy)	Federico Viviani	4	0	1	0	0	0	4	0	1
8	MF	(Algeria)	Saphir Taïder	1	0	0	0	0	0	1	0	0
16	MF	(Hungary)	Ádám Nagy	4	0	0	0	0	0	4	0	0
17	MF	(Ghana)	Godfred Donsah	2	0	0	1	0	0	3	0	0
31	MF	(Switzerland)	Blerim Džemaili	10	0	0	0	0	0	10	0	0
9	FW	(Italy)	Simone Verdi	4	0	0	0	0	0	4	0	0
10	FW	(Italy)	Mattia Destro	4	0	0	0	0	0	4	0	0
11	FW	(Czech Republic)	Ladislav Krejčí	2	0	0	0	0	0	2	0	0
14	FW	(Italy)	Federico Di Francesco	3	0	1	1	0	0	4	0	1
19	FW	(Nigeria)	Umar Sadiq	2	0	0	0	0	0	2	0	0
21	FW	(Croatia)	Bruno Petković	1	0	0	0	0	0	1	0	0
30	FW	(Nigeria)	Orji Okwonkwo	1	0	0	1	0	0	2	0	0
Totals				83	2	8	4	0	0	87	2	8

Last updated: 27 May 2017
