= 2015–16 Bologna FC 1909 season =

Bologna
2015–16 season
- President: Joe Tacopina
- Manager: Delio Rossi (until 28 October 2015); Roberto Donadoni (from 28 October 2015)
- Stadium: Stadio Renato Dall'Ara
- Serie A: 14th
- Coppa Italia: Third round
- Top goalscorer: League: Mattia Destro (8); All: Mattia Destro (8)
- Highest home attendance: 29,463 vs Juventus (19 February 2016, Serie A)
- Lowest home attendance: 336 vs Pavia (14 August 2015, Coppa Italia)
- Average home league attendance: 18,899
| Home colours | Away colours | Third colours |

The 2015–16 season was Bologna Football Club 1909's first season back in Serie A after their relegation to Serie B at the end of the 2013–14 season. The club competed in Serie A, finishing 14th after an early season spent in the relegation zone, and in the Coppa Italia, where the club was disappointingly eliminated in the third round by Pavia.

== Players ==
=== Squad information ===
As of 2 February 2016

Note: Flags indicate national team as defined under FIFA eligibility rules; some limited exceptions apply. Players may hold more than one non-FIFA nationality.

| No. | Pos. | Nation | Player |
|---|---|---|---|
| 1 | GK | BRA | Angelo da Costa |
| 2 | DF | GRE | Marios Oikonomou |
| 3 | DF | ITA | Archimede Morleo |
| 4 | DF | SWE | Emil Krafth |
| 5 | DF | CHI | Erick Pulgar |
| 6 | MF | ITA | Lorenzo Crisetig (on loan from Internazionale) |
| 8 | MF | ALG | Saphir Taïder (on loan from Inter) |
| 10 | FW | ITA | Mattia Destro |
| 11 | DF | COL | Juan Zúñiga |
| 13 | DF | ITA | Luca Rossettini |
| 14 | MF | ARG | Franco Zuculini |
| 15 | DF | SEN | Ibrahima Mbaye |
| 17 | MF | ITA | Emanuele Giaccherini (on loan from Sunderland) |
| 18 | FW | ITA | Robert Acquafresca |
| 19 | DF | GUI | Kévin Constant |

| No. | Pos. | Nation | Player |
|---|---|---|---|
| 20 | DF | ITA | Domenico Maietta |
| 21 | MF | GUI | Amadou Diawara |
| 22 | MF | ITA | Luca Rizzo (on loan from Sampdoria) |
| 23 | MF | ITA | Franco Brienza |
| 24 | DF | ITA | Alex Ferrari |
| 25 | DF | ITA | Adam Masina |
| 26 | MF | FRA | Anthony Mounier |
| 28 | DF | ITA | Daniele Gastaldello |
| 30 | MF | GHA | Godfred Donsah (on loan from Cagliari) |
| 32 | GK | MKD | Dejan Stojanović |
| 33 | MF | ITA | Matteo Brighi |
| 77 | DF | ITA | Luca Ceccarelli |
| 83 | GK | ITA | Antonio Mirante |
| 99 | FW | ITA | Sergio Floccari |

== Transfers ==
=== In ===
| Date | Pos. | Player | Age | Moving from | Fee | Notes | Source |
|---|---|---|---|---|---|---|---|
| 23 June 2015 | MF | (Guinea) Amadou Diawara | 17 | San Marino | Undisclosed | | |
| 23 June 2015 | DF | (Italy) Luca Rossettini | 30 | (Italy) Cagliari | €2.5M | | |
| 3 July 2015 | GK | (Italy) Antonio Mirante | 31 | (Italy) Parma | Free | | |
| 20 July 2015 | MF | (Italy) Matteo Brighi | 34 | (Italy) Sassuolo | Free | | |
| 24 July 2015 | MF | (Italy) Franco Brienza | 36 | (Italy) Cesena | Free | | |
| 7 August 2015 | DF | (Chile) Erick Pulgar | 21 | (Chile) Universidad Católica | Undisclosed | | |
| 20 August 2015 | FW | (Italy) Mattia Destro | 24 | (Italy) Roma | €6.5M | | |
| 26 August 2015 | MF | (Hungary) Bálint Vécsei | 22 | (Hungary) Honvéd | Undisclosed | | |
| 29 August 2015 | MF | (France) Anthony Mounier | 27 | (France) Montpellier | Undisclosed | | |
| 11 January 2016 | FW | (Italy) Sergio Floccari | 34 | (Italy) Sassuolo | Undisclosed | | |
| 1 February 2016 | DF | (Guinea) Kévin Constant | 28 | Unattached | Free | | |

==== Loans in ====
| Date | Pos. | Player | Age | Moving from | Fee | Notes | Source |
|---|---|---|---|---|---|---|---|
| 13 January 2016 | DF | (Colombia) Juan Zúñiga | 30 | (Italy) Napoli | Loan | | |
| 1 February 2016 | DF | (Italy) Fabrizio Brignani | 18 | (Italy) Cremonese | Loan | reserve team; with option | |

=== Out ===
==== Loans out ====
| Date | Pos. | Player | Age | Moving to | Fee | Notes | Source |
|---|---|---|---|---|---|---|---|
| 4 January 2016 | MF | (Italy) Marco Crimi | 25 | (Italy) Carpi | Loan | | |

== Competitions ==
=== Serie A ===
==== League table ====
| Pos | Team | Pld | W | D | L | GF | GA | GD | Pts |
|---|---|---|---|---|---|---|---|---|---|
| 12 | Torino | 38 | 12 | 9 | 17 | 52 | 55 | −3 | 45 (Note: Torino ahead of Atalanta on head-to-head points; Torino 6 points, Atalanta 0 points.) |
| 13 | Atalanta | 38 | 11 | 12 | 15 | 41 | 47 | −6 | 45 |
| 14 | Bologna | 38 | 11 | 9 | 18 | 33 | 45 | −12 | 42 |
| 15 | Sampdoria | 38 | 10 | 10 | 18 | 48 | 61 | −13 | 40 |
| 16 | Palermo | 38 | 10 | 9 | 19 | 38 | 65 | −27 | 39 (Note: Palermo ahead of Udinese on head-to-head points; Palermo 6 points, Udinese 0 points.) |

Source: Serie A, Soccerway
Rules for classification: 1) Points; 2) Head-to-head points; 3) Head-to-head goal difference; 4) Goal difference; 5) Goals scored; 6) Draw.

==== Results summary ====
| Overall | | | | | | | | Home | | | | | | Away | | | | | |
| Pld | W | D | L | GF | GA | GD | Pts | W | D | L | GF | GA | GD | W | D | L | GF | GA | GD |
|---|---|---|---|---|---|---|---|---|---|---|---|---|---|---|---|---|---|---|---|
| 38 | 11 | 9 | 18 | 33 | 45 | −12 | 42 | 5 | 5 | 9 | 20 | 21 | −1 | 6 | 4 | 9 | 13 | 24 | −11 |

Last updated: 15 May 2016.
Source: Competitive matches

==== Results by round ====
| Round | 1 | 2 | 3 | 4 | 5 | 6 | 7 | 8 | 9 | 10 | 11 | 12 | 13 | 14 | 15 | 16 | 17 | 18 | 19 | 20 | 21 | 22 | 23 | 24 | 25 | 26 | 27 | 28 | 29 | 30 | 31 | 32 | 33 | 34 | 35 | 36 | 37 | 38 |
|---|---|---|---|---|---|---|---|---|---|---|---|---|---|---|---|---|---|---|---|---|---|---|---|---|---|---|---|---|---|---|---|---|---|---|---|---|---|---|
| Ground | A | H | A | H | A | H | A | H | A | H | H | A | H | A | H | A | H | A | H | H | A | H | A | H | A | H | A | H | A | A | H | A | H | A | H | A | H | A |
| Result | L | L | L | W | L | L | L | L | W | L | W | W | D | L | W | W | L | W | L | D | W | W | L | D | W | D | D | D | L | L | L | D | L | L | W | D | L | D |
| Position | 12 | 16 | 19 | 17 | 18 | 19 | 20 | 20 | 18 | 18 | 18 | 16 | 17 | 18 | 15 | 13 | 15 | 15 | 15 | 15 | 12 | 10 | 10 | 11 | 10 | 9 | 9 | 9 | 9 | 10 | 12 | 13 | 13 | 16 | 15 | 13 | 14 | 14 |

Updated to match(es) played on 15 May 2016. Source: Competitive matches
A = Away; H = Home; W = Win; D = Draw; L = Loss

==== Matches ====
| 23 August 2015 1 | Lazio | 2–1 | Bologna | Rome |
| 20:45 CEST (UTC+02:00) | Biglia 17'; Kishna 23'; Milinković-Savić (yellow card) 68'; Radu (yellow card) 90' | Report | Mancosu 43'; Brighi (yellow card) 54' | Stadium: Stadio Olimpico; Attendance: 19,464; Referee: Gianluca Rocchi |

| 29 August 2015 2 | Bologna | 0–1 | Sassuolo | Bologna |
| 18:00 CEST (UTC+02:00) | Falco (yellow card) 18'; Destro (yellow card) 26'; Ferrari (yellow card) 66' | Report | Cannavaro (yellow card) 24'; Floro Flores 86' | Stadium: Stadio Renato Dall'Ara; Attendance: 15,732; Referee: Carmine Russo |

| 14 September 2015 3 | Sampdoria | 2–0 | Bologna | Genoa |
| 20:45 CEST (UTC+02:00) | Regini (yellow card) 8'; Éder 75'; Soriano 79' | Report | Taïder (yellow card) 11'; Maietta (yellow card) 45+3'; Rizzo (yellow card) 51' (yellow-red card) 62'; Rossettini (yellow card) 65' | Stadium: Stadio Luigi Ferraris; Attendance: 20,976; Referee: Angelo Cervellera |
Note: Postponed from 13 September due to excessive rain.

| 20 September 2015 4 | Bologna | 1–0 | Frosinone | Bologna |
| 15:00 CEST (UTC+02:00) | Diawara (yellow card) 18'; Mounier 27'; Crisetig (yellow card) 53'; Ferrari (yellow card) 71' | Report | Longo (yellow card) 32'; Sammarco (yellow card) 48'; Paganini (yellow card) 59'; Soddimo (yellow card) 61'; Pavlović (yellow card) 89' | Stadium: Stadio Renato Dall'Ara; Attendance: 15,722; Referee: Daniele Orsato |

| 23 September 2015 5 | Fiorentina | 2–0 | Bologna | Florence |
| 20:45 CEST (UTC+02:00) | Błaszczykowski 71'; Rebić (yellow card) 76'; Kalinić 82' | Report | Diawara (yellow card) 43'; Masina (yellow card) 70' | Stadium: Stadio Artemio Franchi; Attendance: 25,085; Referee: Gianpaolo Calvarese |

| 27 September 2015 6 | Bologna | 1–2 | Udinese | Bologna |
| 15:00 CEST (UTC+02:00) | Mounier 31', (yellow card) 34'; Destro (yellow card) 41'; Diawara (yellow card) 50'; Masina (yellow card) 57' | Report | Ali Adnan (yellow card) 45+1'; Badu 61'; Lodi (yellow card) 66'; Zapata 85'; Pasquale (yellow card) 88' | Stadium: Stadio Renato Dall'Ara; Attendance: 15,576; Referee: Andrea Gervasoni |

| 4 October 2015 7 | Juventus | 3–1 | Bologna | Turin |
| 18:00 CEST (UTC+02:00) | Morata 33'; Dybala 53' (pen.); Khedira 63'; Lemina (yellow card) 83' | Report | Mounier 5', (yellow card) 45+1'; Destro (yellow card) 40'; Gastaldello (yellow card) 42'; Masina (yellow card) 50'; Pulgar (yellow card) 56' | Stadium: Juventus Stadium; Attendance: 39,330; Referee: Domenico Celi |

| 18 October 2015 8 | Bologna | 0–1 | Palermo | Bologna |
| 12:30 CEST (UTC+02:00) | Rizzo (yellow card) 74' | Report | Vázquez 24', (yellow card) 24'; Hiljemark (yellow card) 46'; Struna (yellow card) 66'; Rispoli (yellow card) 81' | Stadium: Stadio Renato Dall'Ara; Attendance: 16,010; Referee: Michael Fabbri |

| 24 October 2015 9 | Carpi | 1–2 | Bologna | Modena |
| 18:00 CEST (UTC+02:00) | Belec (yellow card) 4'; Lollo (yellow card) 7' (yellow-red card) 38'; Letizia 24'; Spolli (yellow card) 90+3' | Report | Mounier (yellow card) 40'; Mbaye (yellow card) 45'; Gastaldello 47'; Masina 90+3' | Stadium: Stadio Alberto Braglia; Attendance: 6,747; Referee: Paolo Tagliavento |

| 27 October 2015 10 | Bologna | 0–1 | Internazionale | Bologna |
| 20:45 CET (UTC+01:00) | Rossettini (yellow card) 87' | Report | Kondogbia (yellow card) 39'; Melo (yellow card) 53' (yellow-red card) 60'; Icardi 67' | Stadium: Stadio Renato Dall'Ara; Attendance: 22,350; Referee: Luca Banti |

| 1 November 2015 11 | Bologna | 3–0 | Atalanta | Bologna |
| 15:00 CET (UTC+01:00) | Taïder (yellow card) 13'; Ferrari (yellow card) 40'; Gastaldello (yellow card) 47'; Giaccherini 52', (yellow card) 53'; Destro 58'; Masina (yellow card) 77'; Brienza 85' | Report | Kurtić (yellow card) 31'; Carmona (yellow card) 80'; Pinilla (yellow card) 90' | Stadium: Stadio Renato Dall'Ara; Attendance: 15,748; Referee: Marco Guida |

| 7 November 2015 12 | Hellas Verona | 0–2 | Bologna | Verona |
| 18:00 CET (UTC+01:00) | Pazzini (yellow card) 88' | Report | Giaccherini 6'; Donsah 14', (yellow card) 71' | Stadium: Stadio Marc'Antonio Bentegodi; Attendance: 18,007; Referee: Daniele Orsato |

| 21 November 2015 13 | Bologna | 2–2 | Roma | Bologna |
| 18:00 CET (UTC+01:00) | Masina 14'; Donsah (yellow card) 26'; Gastaldello (yellow card) 33'; Mirante (yellow card) 38'; Maietta (yellow card) 54'; Destro 87' (pen.), (yellow card) 88' | Report | Manolas (yellow card) 12'; Nainggolan (yellow card) 33'; Pjanić 52' (pen.); Iturbe (yellow card) 57'; Džeko 72' (pen.); Torosidis (yellow card) 85' | Stadium: Stadio Renato Dall'Ara; Attendance: 23,304; Referee: Gianluca Rocchi |

| 28 November 2015 14 | Torino | 2–0 | Bologna | Turin |
| 18:00 CET (UTC+01:00) | Belotti 75'; Vives 90+2' | Report | Maietta (yellow card) 64' | Stadium: Stadio Olimpico di Torino; Attendance: 17,508; Referee: Davide Ghersini |

| 6 December 2015 15 | Bologna | 3–2 | Napoli | Bologna |
| 12:30 CET (UTC+01:00) | Destro 14', 60', (yellow card) 40'; Rossettini 21'; Masina (yellow card) 90+2' | Report | Allan (yellow card) 60'; Higuaín 87', 90' | Stadium: Stadio Renato Dall'Ara; Attendance: 22,334; Referee: Paolo Mazzoleni |

| 12 December 2015 16 | Genoa | 0–1 | Bologna | Genoa |
| 15:00 CET (UTC+01:00) | Perotti (red card) 81' | Report | Gastaldello (yellow card) 25'; Mounier (yellow card) 73'; Diawara (yellow card) 81' (yellow-red card) 90+3'; Rossettini 90+2' | Stadium: Stadio Luigi Ferraris; Attendance: 19,594; Referee: Marco Di Bello |

| 19 December 2015 17 | Bologna | 2–3 | Empoli | Bologna |
| 20:45 CET (UTC+01:00) | Brienza 36'; Destro 45'; Pulgar (yellow card) 74'; Taïder (yellow card) 87' | Report | Pucciarelli 24'; Costa (yellow card) 34'; Maccarone 42', 48'; Laurini (yellow card) 56'; Skorupski (yellow card) 57'; Mário Rui (yellow card) 65' | Stadium: Stadio Renato Dall'Ara; Attendance: 19,214; Referee: Maurizio Mariani |

| 6 January 2016 18 | Milan | 0–1 | Bologna | Milan |
| 15:00 CET (UTC+01:00) | Montolivo (yellow card) 31'; De Sciglio (yellow card) 58'; Abate (yellow card) 75'; Mexès (yellow card) 85'; Kucka (yellow card) 90'; Luiz Adriano (yellow card) 90+2' | Report | Mounier (yellow card) 12'; Diawara (yellow card) 21'; Masina (yellow card) 38'; Giaccherini 82'; Brighi (yellow card) 90+1'; Destro (yellow card) 90+3' | Stadium: San Siro; Attendance: 31,381; Referee: Davide Massa |

| 10 January 2016 19 | Bologna | 0–1 | Chievo | Bologna |
| 15:00 CET (UTC+01:00) | Destro (yellow card) 86'; Oikonomou (yellow card) 90+2' | Report | Frey (yellow card) 37'; Pepe 79'; Cacciatore (yellow card) 87' | Stadium: Stadio Renato Dall'Ara; Attendance: 15,818; Referee: Claudio Gavillucci |

| 17 January 2016 20 | Bologna | 2–2 | Lazio | Bologna |
| 15:00 CET (UTC+01:00) | Giaccherini 2'; Destro 18', (yellow card) 55'; Masina (red card) 69' | Report | Maurício (yellow card) 42'; Candreva 71' (pen.); Biglia (yellow card) 73'; Lulić 77' | Stadium: Stadio Renato Dall'Ara; Attendance: 16,449; Referee: Marco Di Bello |

| 24 January 2016 21 | Sassuolo | 0–2 | Bologna | Reggio Emilia |
| 15:00 CET (UTC+01:00) | | Report | Giaccherini 68'; Ferrari (yellow card) 87'; Brighi (yellow card) 90+1'; Floccari 90+4' | Stadium: Mapei Stadium – Città del Tricolore; Attendance: 12,202; Referee: Angelo Cervellera |

| 31 January 2016 22 | Bologna | 3–2 | Sampdoria | Bologna |
| 15:00 CET (UTC+01:00) | Mounier 12', (yellow card) 63'; Donsah 24'; Gastaldello (yellow card) 68'; Destro 88' (pen.); Oikonomou (yellow card) 90+2' | Report | Fernando (yellow card) 32'; Muriel 54'; Ivan (yellow card) 61'; Silvestre (yellow card) 65'; Correa 80', (yellow card) 86'; Álvarez (yellow card) 87' | Stadium: Stadio Renato Dall'Ara; Attendance: 18,043; Referee: Michael Fabbri |

| 3 February 2016 23 | Frosinone | 1–0 | Bologna | Frosinone |
| 18:30 CET (UTC+01:00) | Blanchard (yellow card) 29'; Russo (yellow card) 34'; Dionisi 77' (pen.) | Report | Diawara (yellow card) 9'; Taïder (yellow card) 22'; Oikonomou (yellow card) 35' (yellow-red card) 64'; Ferrari (yellow card) 45'; Rossettini (yellow card) 76' | Stadium: Stadio Matusa; Attendance: 6,177; Referee: Andrea Gervasoni |

| 6 February 2016 24 | Bologna | 1–1 | Fiorentina | Bologna |
| 18:00 CET (UTC+01:00) | Giaccherini 63', (yellow card) 65'; Diawara (yellow card) 64' | Report | Fernández (yellow card) 48' (yellow-red card) 57'; Bernardeschi 59'; Astori (yellow card) 65'; Roncaglia (yellow card) 69' | Stadium: Stadio Renato Dall'Ara; Attendance: 19,591; Referee: Luca Banti |

| 14 February 2016 25 | Udinese | 0–1 | Bologna | Udine |
| 15:00 CET (UTC+01:00) | | Report | Gastaldello (yellow card) 73'; Destro 79' | Stadium: Stadio Friuli; Attendance: 14,975; Referee: Carmine Russo |

| 19 February 2016 26 | Bologna | 0–0 | Juventus | Bologna |
| 20:45 CET (UTC+01:00) | Gastaldello (yellow card) 33'; Diawara (yellow card) 90+3' | Report | Sturaro (yellow card) 41'; Marchisio (yellow card) 45' | Stadium: Stadio Renato Dall'Ara; Attendance: 29,463; Referee: Massimiliano Irrati |

| 28 February 2016 27 | Palermo | 0–0 | Bologna | Palermo |
| 12:30 CET (UTC+01:00) | Chochev (yellow card) 43'; Morganella (yellow card) 63'; Vitiello (yellow card) 90' | Report | Diawara (yellow card) 85' | Stadium: Stadio Renzo Barbera; Attendance: 15,566; Referee: Marco Di Bello |

| 6 March 2016 28 | Bologna | 0–0 | Carpi | Bologna |
| 15:00 CET (UTC+01:00) | Giaccherini (yellow card) 45+3' | Report | Romagnoli (yellow card) 18'; Crimi (yellow card) 73'; Gagliolo (yellow card) 90+3' | Stadium: Stadio Renato Dall'Ara; Attendance: 16,820; Referee: Paolo Mazzoleni |

| 12 March 2016 29 | Internazionale | 2–1 | Bologna | Milan |
| 20:45 CET (UTC+01:00) | Medel (yellow card) 56'; Perišić 72'; D'Ambrosio 76'; Palacio (yellow card) 90+3' | Report | Brienza 90' | Stadium: San Siro; Attendance: 40,267; Referee: Gianpaolo Calvarese |

| 20 March 2016 30 | Atalanta | 2–0 | Bologna | Bergamo |
| 12:30 CET (UTC+01:00) | Gómez 27'; Pinilla (yellow card) 43'; Diamanti 45+1' | Report | Giaccherini (yellow card) 50'; Rizzo (yellow card) 52'; Gastaldello (yellow card) 77' (yellow-red card) 85'; Mbaye (red card) 78' | Stadium: Stadio Atleti Azzurri d'Italia; Attendance: 18,258; Referee: Piero Giacomelli |

| 4 April 2016 31 | Bologna | 0–1 | Hellas Verona | Bologna |
| 20:45 CEST (UTC+02:00) | Maietta (yellow card) 22'; Giaccherini (yellow card) 68'; Ferrari (yellow card) 90+4' | Report | Samir 42'; Viviani (yellow card) 53' | Stadium: Stadio Renato Dall'Ara; Attendance: 16,606; Referee: Davide Ghersini |

| 11 April 2016 32 | Roma | 1–1 | Bologna | Rome |
| 20:45 CEST (UTC+02:00) | Salah 50'; Totti (yellow card) 90+3' | Report | Rossettini 25'; Mbaye (yellow card) 35'; Oikonomou (yellow card) 78' | Stadium: Stadio Olimpico; Attendance: 32,835; Referee: Davide Massa |

| 16 April 2016 33 | Bologna | 0–1 | Torino | Bologna |
| 15:00 CEST (UTC+02:00) | Rossettini (yellow card) 13'; Brienza (yellow card) 28'; Masina (yellow card) 82'; Mirante (yellow card) 90+4' | Report | Bovo (yellow card) 41'; Belotti 90+3' (pen.) | Stadium: Stadio Renato Dall'Ara; Attendance: 20,655; Referee: Rosario Abisso |

| 19 April 2016 34 | Napoli | 6–0 | Bologna | Naples |
| 20:45 CEST (UTC+02:00) | Gabbiadini 10', 35' (pen.); Mertens 58', 80', 88'; Albiol (yellow card) 74'; López 89' | Report | Mbaye (yellow card) 37'; Diawara (yellow card) 53' | Stadium: Stadio San Paolo; Attendance: 22,533; Referee: Andrea Gervasoni |

| 24 April 2016 35 | Bologna | 2–0 | Genoa | Bologna |
| 15:00 CEST (UTC+02:00) | Giaccherini 11'; Rossettini (yellow card) 48'; Foccari 63' | Report | Rincón (yellow card) 37'; Muñoz (yellow card) 42' | Stadium: Stadio Renato Dall'Ara; Attendance: 17,099; Referee: Antonio Damato |

| 1 May 2016 36 | Empoli | 0–0 | Bologna | Empoli |
| 15:00 CEST (UTC+02:00) | | Report | Oikonomou (yellow card) 87'; Masina (yellow card) 90+4' | Stadium: Stadio Carlo Castellani; Attendance: 9,727; Referee: Daniele Chiffi |

| 7 May 2016 37 | Bologna | 0–1 | Milan | Bologna |
| 20:45 CEST (UTC+02:00) | Diawara (yellow card) 6' (yellow-red card) 12'; Oikonomou (yellow card) 35'; Da Costa (yellow card) 39'; Giaccherini (yellow card) 89' | Report | Mauri (yellow card) 6'; Mexès (yellow card) 16'; Bacca 40' (pen.); Bertolacci (yellow card) 58'; Calabria (yellow card) 63'; Romagnoli (yellow card) 90+4' | Stadium: Stadio Renato Dall'Ara; Attendance: 22,544; Referee: Daniele Doveri |

| 15 May 2016 38 | Chievo | 0–0 | Bologna | Verona |
| 15:00 CEST (UTC+02:00) | Sardo (yellow card) 34'; M'Poku (yellow card) 37' | Report | Giaccherini (yellow card) 45' | Stadium: Stadio Marc'Antonio Bentegodi; Attendance: 8,000; Referee: Riccardo Ros |

=== Coppa Italia ===
| 14 August 2015 Third round | Bologna | 0–1 | Pavia | Vicenza |
| 21:00 CEST (UTC+02:00) | Ferrari (red card) 45+2'; Diawara (yellow card) 82'; Oikonomou (yellow card) 85' | Report | Del Sante 37'; Marchi (yellow card) 57' | Stadium: Stadio Romeo Menti; Attendance: 336; Referee: Michael Fabbri |

== Statistics ==
=== Appearances and goals ===
| No. | Pos | Nat | Player | Total | | Serie A | | Coppa Italia | |
| No. | Pos | Nat | Player | Apps | Goals | Apps | Goals | Apps | Goals |
Goalkeepers
| 1 | GK | (Brazil) BRA | Angelo da Costa | 5 | 0 | 5 | 0 | 0 | 0 |
| 32 | GK | (Austria) AUT | Dejan Stojanović | 0 | 0 | 0 | 0 | 0 | 0 |
| 83 | GK | (Italy) ITA | Antonio Mirante | 33 | 0 | 32 | 0 | 1 | 0 |
| 97 | GK | (Senegal) SEN | Mouhamadou Sarr | 0 | 0 | 0 | 0 | 0 | 0 |
Defenders
| 2 | DF | (Greece) GRE | Marios Oikonomou | 22 | 0 | 18+3 | 0 | 1 | 0 |
| 3 | DF | (Italy) ITA | Archimede Morleo | 5 | 0 | 5 | 0 | 0 | 0 |
| 4 | DF | (Sweden) SWE | Emil Krafth | 3 | 0 | 1+2 | 0 | 0 | 0 |
| 5 | DF | (Chile) CHI | Erick Pulgar | 12 | 0 | 6+6 | 0 | 0 | 0 |
| 11 | DF | (Colombia) COL | Juan Zúñiga | 8 | 0 | 3+5 | 0 | 0 | 0 |
| 13 | DF | (Italy) ITA | Luca Rossettini | 29 | 3 | 27+1 | 3 | 1 | 0 |
| 15 | DF | (Senegal) SEN | Ibrahima Mbaye | 16 | 0 | 11+4 | 0 | 0+1 | 0 |
| 19 | DF | (Guinea) GUI | Kévin Constant | 7 | 0 | 3+4 | 0 | 0 | 0 |
| 20 | DF | (Italy) ITA | Domenico Maietta | 19 | 0 | 18+1 | 0 | 0 | 0 |
| 24 | DF | (Italy) ITA | Alex Ferrari | 21 | 0 | 12+8 | 0 | 1 | 0 |
| 25 | DF | (Morocco) MAR | Adam Masina | 33 | 2 | 29+3 | 2 | 1 | 0 |
| 28 | DF | (Italy) ITA | Daniele Gastaldello | 26 | 1 | 26 | 1 | 0 | 0 |
Midfielders
| 6 | MF | (Italy) ITA | Lorenzo Crisetig | 5 | 0 | 3+1 | 0 | 1 | 0 |
| 8 | MF | (Algeria) ALG | Saphir Taïder | 29 | 0 | 25+4 | 0 | 0 | 0 |
| 14 | MF | (Argentina) ARG | Franco Zuculini | 1 | 0 | 0+1 | 0 | 0 | 0 |
| 17 | MF | (Italy) ITA | Emanuele Giaccherini | 27 | 7 | 26+1 | 7 | 0 | 0 |
| 21 | MF | (Guinea) GUI | Amadou Diawara | 35 | 0 | 31+3 | 0 | 0+1 | 0 |
| 22 | MF | (Italy) ITA | Luca Rizzo | 24 | 0 | 17+6 | 0 | 1 | 0 |
| 23 | MF | (Italy) ITA | Franco Brienza | 29 | 3 | 15+13 | 3 | 1 | 0 |
| 26 | MF | (France) FRA | Anthony Mounier | 29 | 4 | 23+6 | 4 | 0 | 0 |
| 30 | MF | (Ghana) GHA | Godfred Donsah | 20 | 2 | 18+2 | 2 | 0 | 0 |
| 33 | MF | (Italy) ITA | Matteo Brighi | 23 | 0 | 13+9 | 0 | 1 | 0 |
Forwards
| 10 | FW | (Italy) ITA | Mattia Destro | 27 | 8 | 25+2 | 8 | 0 | 0 |
| 18 | FW | (Italy) ITA | Robert Acquafresca | 7 | 0 | 2+4 | 0 | 1 | 0 |
| 99 | FW | (Italy) ITA | Sergio Floccari | 17 | 2 | 9+8 | 2 | 0 | 0 |
Players transferred out during the season
| 7 | FW | (Italy) ITA | Filippo Falco | 9 | 0 | 1+8 | 0 | 0 | 0 |
| 11 | FW | (Italy) ITA | Matteo Mancosu | 10 | 1 | 3+6 | 1 | 0+1 | 0 |
| 21 | FW | (Italy) ITA | Daniele Cacia | 1 | 0 | 0 | 0 | 1 | 0 |
| 90 | MF | (Italy) ITA | Marco Crimi | 1 | 0 | 1 | 0 | 0 | 0 |

Last updated: 8 May 2016
Source: Competitions

=== Goalscorers ===
| Rank | No. | Pos | Nat | Name | Serie A | Coppa Italia | Total |
|---|---|---|---|---|---|---|---|
| 1 | 10 | FW | (Italy) | Mattia Destro | 8 | 0 | 8 |
| 2 | 17 | MF | (Italy) | Emanuele Giaccherini | 7 | 0 | 7 |
| 3 | 26 | MF | (France) | Anthony Mounier | 4 | 0 | 4 |
| 4 | 13 | DF | (Italy) | Luca Rossettini | 3 | 0 | 3 |
| 4 | 23 | MF | (Italy) | Franco Brienza | 3 | 0 | 3 |
| 6 | 25 | DF | (Morocco) | Adam Masina | 2 | 0 | 2 |
| 6 | 30 | MF | (Ghana) | Godfred Donsah | 2 | 0 | 2 |
| 6 | 99 | FW | (Italy) | Sergio Floccari | 2 | 0 | 2 |
| 9 | 11 | FW | (Italy) | Matteo Mancosu | 1 | 0 | 1 |
| 9 | 28 | DF | (Italy) | Daniele Gastaldello | 1 | 0 | 1 |
| Own goal | | | | | 0 | 0 | 0 |
| Totals | | | | | 33 | 0 | 33 |

Last updated: 24 April 2016

=== Clean sheets ===
| Rank | No. | Pos | Nat | Name | Serie A | Coppa Italia | Total |
|---|---|---|---|---|---|---|---|
| 1 | 83 | GK | (Italy) | Antonio Mirante | 11 | 0 | 11 |
| Totals | | | | | 11 | 0 | 11 |

Last updated: 1 May 2016
