= Ladislav Krejčí =

Ladislav Krejčí may refer to:

- Ladislav Krejčí (footballer, born 1992), Czech footballer
- Ladislav Krejčí (footballer, born 1999), Czech footballer
