= Mattia Destro =

Italian footballer (born 1991)

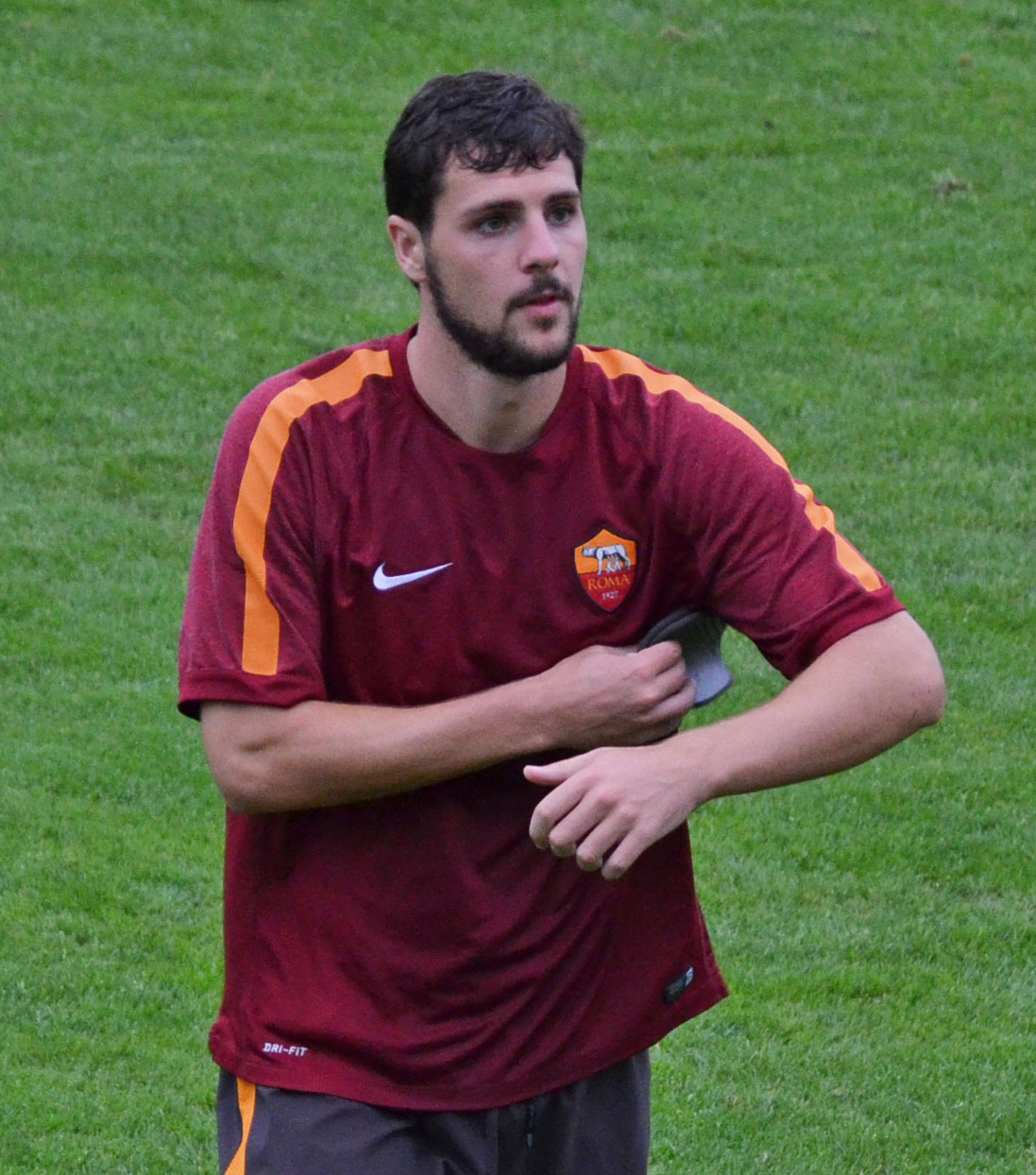
- Destro with Roma in 2014

Personal information
- Date of birth: 20 March 1991 (age 35)
- Place of birth: Ascoli Piceno, Italy
- Height: 1.82 m (6 ft 0 in)
- Position: Striker

Youth career
- 2004–2005: Ascoli
- 2005–2010: Inter Milan

Senior career*
Years	Team	Apps	(Gls)
2010–2011	Inter Milan	0	(0)
2010	→ Genoa (loan)	10	(2)
2011–2012	Genoa	8	(1)
2011–2012	→ Siena (loan)	32	(13)
2012	Siena	0	(0)
2012–2013	Genoa	0	(0)
2012–2013	→ Roma (loan)	26	(11)
2013–2015	Roma	42	(18)
2015	→ AC Milan (loan)	15	(3)
2015–2020	Bologna	105	(29)
2020	→ Genoa (loan)	8	(0)
2020–2022	Genoa	56	(20)
2022–2024	Empoli	32	(1)
2025	Reggiana	1	(0)

International career^{‡}
2006–2007	Italy U16	12	(5)
2007–2008	Italy U17	9	(5)
2009	Italy U18	1	(1)
2008–2010	Italy U19	14	(16)
2010–2013	Italy U21	15	(5)
2012–2014	Italy	8	(1)
- * Club domestic league appearances and goals as of 23:18, 26 May 2024 (UTC) ‡ National team caps and goals as of 22 December 2017

Mattia Destro (Italian pronunciation: [matˈtiːa ˈdɛstro]; born 20 March 1991) is an Italian professional footballer who plays as a striker. He has also featured at international level, holding eight caps for Italy.

== Club career ==
=== Youth career ===
Destro began his career with hometown club Ascoli. In the 2004–05 season, he played in the Giovanissimi Nazionali squad, while his father Flavio was coaching the Allievi Nazionali team. In mid-2005, he joined Inter Milan's youth system.

Destro was the top-scorer of the Giovanissimi Nazionali team in the 2005–06 season, the second top-scorer of the Allievi Nazionali team in the 2006–07 season (behind Mario Balotelli), and the second top-scorer of the Primavera team in the 2008–09 season (behind Aiman Napoli). Destro won the league with the Allievi Nazionali team in 2008, and also played for the Primavera team – the senior youth team, scoring four goals in the league group stage; 1 in Primavera league playoff, winning 2008 Torneo di Viareggio and losing to Sampdoria in the final of the Primavera League.

Destro scored 18 goals in the 2009–10 Campionato Nazionale Primavera Group Stage and played a few club friendly matches for the first team. Destro won the 2009–10 UEFA Champions League despite not being used in any of the matches — he had been included in the Champions League list as one of the under-21 youth products in the B list since the 2008–09 edition of the tournament.

=== Genoa ===
In June 2010, La Gazzetta dello Sport reported that Inter Milan agreed a deal with Genoa to sign centre-back Andrea Ranocchia and that Destro was part of the exchange deal. The transfer became official on 20 July 2010, when Genoa purchased a preferential option to sign Destro in a co-ownership deal in June 2010.

After the injury of Luca Toni, Destro started his first match in Serie A, against Chievo, on 12 September 2010 as the only central forward in the 3–4–3 formation chosen for the match, and scored a goal in the sixth minute of the match. However, Genoa lost the match 1–3.

As another 50% registration rights of Ranocchia were sold to Inter in January 2011 for €12.5 million, Destro was sold to Genoa in June for €4.5 million. That month, Genoa also signed his Inter teammate Samuele Longo in a co-ownership deal. The two strikers became part of the exchange that led to Inter's signing of Ranocchia.

=== Siena ===
In 2011, Destro left for Serie A newcomers Siena on loan for €1.5 million with an option for a co-ownership deal.

Destro became the team's top goalscorer with 12 goals, followed by Emanuele Calaiò's 11 goals. On 20 June 2012, Siena purchased half of Destro's registration rights from Genoa for €1.3 million. However, after Roma formed an agreement with both Genoa and Siena, Genoa bought back Destro from Siena for €7.5 million million (€6 million cash plus half of Eugenio Lamanna) in order to complete the deal.

=== Roma ===
On 30 July 2012, Roma announced they had signed Destro from Genoa in a loan deal for €11.5 million (€8.5 million cash plus half of the rights to both Giammario Piscitella and Valerio Verre) with the option to purchase him outright for an additional €4.5 million (which meant Destro would cost Roma €16 million in total if the purchase was completed). Destro would replace the Liverpool-bound striker Fabio Borini, whom Roma just sold for €13.3 million. Destro made his Roma debut on 2 September 2012 in a 3–1 Serie A win away against Inter. He scored his first goal for the Giallorossi in a 4–1 home match against Palermo on 4 November. He also received his first red card with the club in the same match after receiving two bookings from the referee, the second of which was for taking off his shirt when celebrating his goal. Destro played 21 Serie A matches for Roma in his first season, many in which he came on as a substitute, and scored six goals. Roma finished a distant sixth in Serie A, but did reach the final of Coppa Italia. Destro scored five goals en route, making him top-scorer for the tournament. However, Lazio edged a 1–0 win over Roma in the final.

Destro had struggled with injury during his first season at Roma, and these problems continued into the 2013–14 season. He did not make his first appearance until 8 November 2013, when he came on as a substitute early in the second half against Fiorentina. He made an immediate impact, scoring the winning goal in the 67th minute in a 2–1 victory. Destro then started playing regularly, showing the goalscoring form from earlier in his career. As the season progressed, he scored twice in a 3–0 win over Sampdoria in February and a hat-trick in a 3–1 win over Cagliari in April 2014. Controversy followed the Cagliari game, during which Destro had punched defender Davide Astori but was not punished at the time by the referee. However, the league authorities later imposed a three-match ban on Destro (which became four matches for accumulated yellow cards). Despite this, Destro scored 13 league goals for Roma, finishing the season as the club's top scorer and helping his side to a second-place finish in Serie A, behind Juventus. He was ranked as one of the best strikers in Serie A. Only Sergio Aguero and Lionel Messi had a better goal-per-minute ratio than Destro across Europe's top five leagues.

Destro was the subject of intense transfer speculation during the summer of 2014, being heavily linked by the media with moves to Chelsea and Real Madrid. VFL Wolfsburg offered €30 million, which was rejected by Roma choosing to keep him. He scored his first goal of the 2014–15 Serie A season on 20 September as Roma won 2–0 against Cagliari. He scored his second of the season in the 2–0 victory over Hellas Verona, a 40-yard half volley to seal the victory after Alessandro Florenzi's earlier strike.

=== AC Milan ===
On 30 January 2015, Destro moved to AC Milan on loan from Roma. He scored his first Milan goal in a 1–1 draw with Empoli on 15 February. He left the club at the end of the 2014–15 season, having scored 3 goals in 15 matches.

=== Bologna ===
On 20 August 2015, Bologna signed Destro from Roma for €8.5 million plus bonuses up to €3 million, on a five-year deal. Destro was the highest earning player of Bologna that season with a net salary of €1.6 million. He made his debut on 22 August 2015, coming on as a substitute in the 2–1 defeat to Lazio. He scored his first goal in a 3–0 win over Atalanta on 1 November. Destro signed a new contract worth €2 million per year.

=== Genoa return ===
On 4 January 2020, Destro agreed a return to Genoa, on loan until the end of the season. On 7 September 2020, he signed a permanent contract with the club on a free transfer.

=== Empoli ===
On 28 June 2022, Destro signed with Serie A club Empoli on a free transfer. After leaving Empoli as a free agent at the end of the 2022–23 season, he re-joined the club on 29 August 2023.

=== Reggiana ===
After 8 months as a free agent, on 31 March 2025 Destro finally signed for a new club, dropping out of Serie A after 15 years to join Serie B club Reggiana until the end of the season.

== International career ==
=== Youth teams ===
Destro has been capped for the Azzurrini at almost every level, from under-16 to under-21, except the under-20 team. Destro received his first call-up in 2005 Christmas to a training camp. Destro scored more than one goal in average for the Italian U19 team, and scored 10 out of his first 11 games. He failed to score, in any of the final tournament's matches.

Destro made his debut for the Italy under-16 team in the international Val-de-Marne tournament. He was the member of under-17 team in 2008 Euro qualification along with then-Inter teammates Davide Santon, Luca Caldirola, and Michele Rigione,) scoring one goal in two appearances. Destro started all three matches of the elite qualification and scored one goal. He was also called up to the 2008 Minsk under-17 International Tournament where he scored a goal in a 1–1 draw with Moldova and a goal in the 3–0 win against Belarus. Eventually the Azzurrini lost 0–1 to Russia (line-up unavailable) and finished third after winning 1–0 against Belgium. (line-up unavailable).

On 17 December 2008, Destro scored a goal in his under-19 debut, a 3–1 win against Romania. Destro scored the only goal in the following match in March 2009, a 1–0 defeat of Norway. He also capped once for the Italian under-18 team in January 2009, scoring a goal in the 3–0 win over Denmark. Due to the early exit of Italy under-19 team in the 2009 season, the Italy under-18 team (players born 1991) was de facto the same team as under-19 (also with players born in 1991). Destro was a regular member of the under-18/19 team, receiving a call-up against Ukraine, but did not play and missed a friendly tournament in Slovakia due to injury. He then scored a goal in the 4–1 friendly win against Denmark in September 2009, and five goals in three appearances in the qualification in November. Teammates Luca Caldirola and Luca Tremolada were also in the starting line-up. Destro then scored a hat-trick against Turkey in January 2010, the opening goal against Germany in March and three goals in two appearances at the elite round in May 2010. Only in the friendly match against Switzerland in April 2010 did Destro not score.

He played all three matches of 2010 UEFA European Under-19 Championship for Italy's U19 team. The team failed to score any goal and finished at the bottom of Group B (equal 7th).

When striker Alberto Paloschi was about to miss the final qualification match of 2011 UEFA European Under-21 Championship qualification due to injury, Destro received his first under-21 call-up and substituted Stefano Okaka in the 80th minute. That Azzurrini won against Wales 1–0 and went on ahead of Wales as the group champions by winning the head-to-head record. On 8 October 2010, he started the play-off match and partnered with Okaka up front in a 4–4–2 formation, scoring the opening goal by converting a Diego Fabbrini pass with a left-foot shot. He was substituted by Luca Marrone in the 53rd minute as the coach changed to a 4–3–3 formation. The Azzurrini eventually defeated Belarus 2–0. However, after losing winger Ezequiel Schelotto and fullback Lorenzo De Silvestri, Italy lost 0–3 to Belarus in Borisov. Destro was substituted by winger Guido Marilungo at half-time. He scored against Turkey in a 1–0 win for the under-21 Championship qualifier.

=== Senior team ===
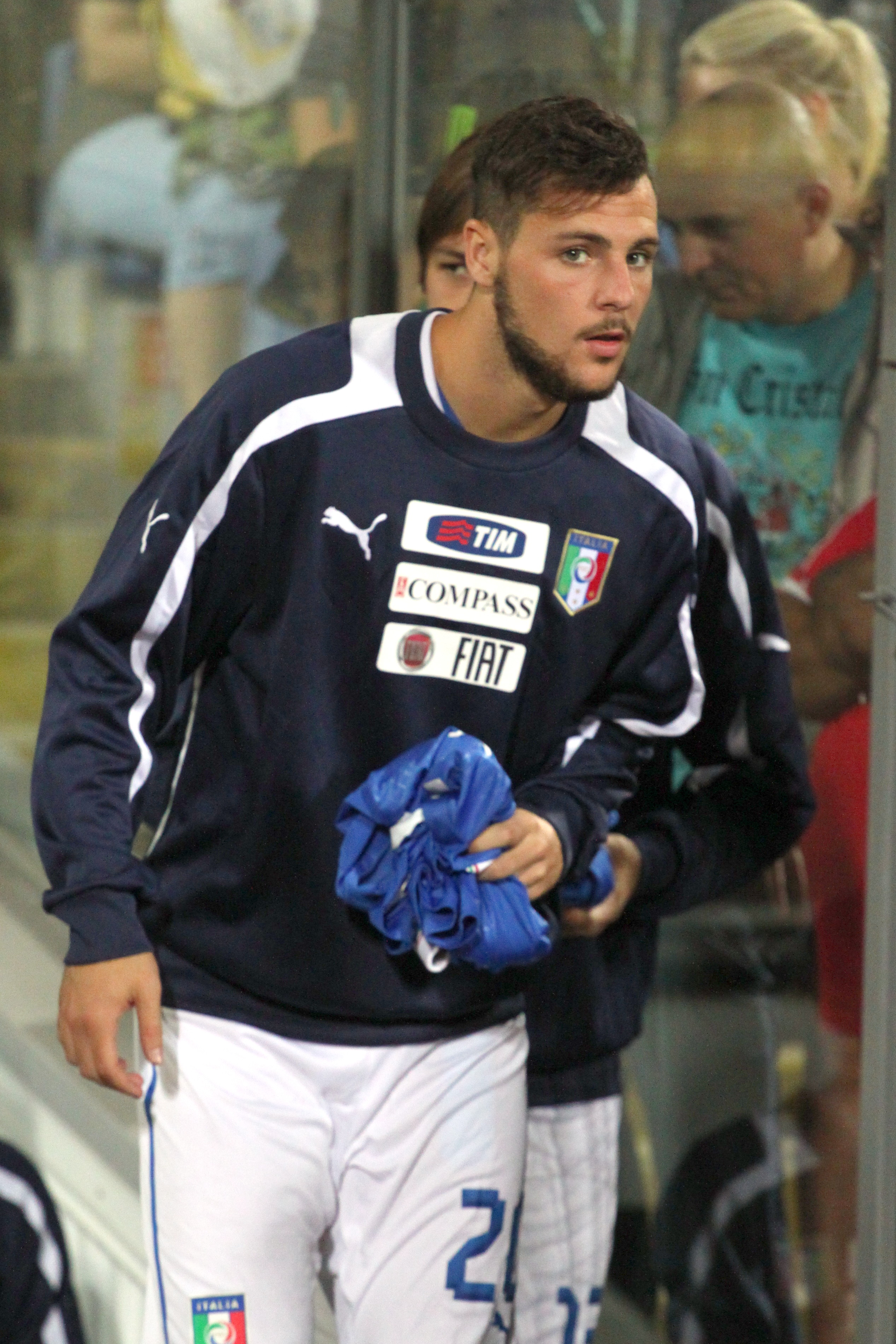
Destro with Italy in 2012

Destro was included by head coach Cesare Prandelli in the 32-man preliminary squad for UEFA Euro 2012 in Poland and Ukraine, but was not included in the final squad for the tournament.

On 15 August 2012, he made his debut with the Italy national team, starting in a 1–2 friendly loss to England at Wembley Stadium. He was substituted off for fellow debutant Diego Fabbrini in the 84th minute. In Destro's third appearance, on 11 September, he scored his first international goal in the first five minutes of Italy's 2–0 win against Malta at the Stadio Alberto Braglia in Modena, in Italy's second 2014 FIFA World Cup qualifying match.

Destro was named in the provisional 30-man squad for the 2014 World Cup, but was one of seven players cut from the final squad.

== Style of play ==
Destro is a quick striker with good technique and an ability to play off of his teammates, which enables him to participate in the build-up of plays. He is an accurate finisher, known for his anticipation, as well as his ability to make attacking runs into the area and subsequently shoot first time.

== Personal life ==
Destro is the son of former Italian footballer Flavio Destro. On 1 September 2014, he married model girlfriend Ludovica Caramis.

In September 2020 he tested positive for COVID-19.

== Career statistics ==
=== Club ===
As of match played 26 May 2024

Appearances and goals by club, season and competition
Club	Season	League			Coppa Italia		Europe		Total	
Club	Season	Division	Apps	Goals	Apps	Goals	Apps	Goals	Apps	Goals
Genoa	2010–11	Serie A	16	2	2	1	—		18	3
Siena	2011–12	Serie A	30	12	1	1	—		31	13
Roma	2012–13	Serie A	21	6	5	5	—		26	11
Roma	2013–14	Serie A	20	13	3	0	—		23	13
Roma	2014–15	Serie A	16	5	1	0	2 (Note: Appearances in UEFA Champions League)	0	19	5
Roma	Total		57	24	9	5	2	0	68	29
AC Milan (loan)	2014–15	Serie A	15	3	—		—		15	3
Bologna	2015–16	Serie A	27	8	—		—		27	8
Bologna	2016–17	Serie A	30	11	3	0	—		33	11
Bologna	2017–18	Serie A	26	6	1	0	—		27	6
Bologna	2018–19	Serie A	17	4	1	0	—		18	4
Bologna	2019–20	Serie A	5	0	2	0	—		7	0
Bologna	Total		105	29	7	0	—		112	29
Genoa (loan)	2019–20	Serie A	8	0	1	0	—		9	0
Genoa	2020–21	Serie A	29	11	1	0	—		30	11
Genoa	2021–22	Serie A	27	9	3	0	—		30	9
Genoa	Total		64	20	5	0	—		69	20
Empoli	2022–23	Serie A	17	1	1	0	—		18	1
Empoli	2023–24	Serie A	15	0	0	0	—		15	0
Empoli	Total		32	1	1	0	—		33	1
Career total			319	91	25	7	2	0	346	98

=== International ===
As of match played 12 July 2015

Appearances and goals by national team and year
National team	Year	Apps	Goals
Italy	2012	4	1
Italy	2014	4	0
Total		8	1

Scores and results list Italy's goal tally first, score column indicates score after each Destro goal.

List of international goals scored by Mattia Destro
No.	Date	Venue	Opponent	Score	Result	Competition
1	11 September 2012	Stadio Alberto Braglia, Modena, Italy	Malta	1–0	2–0	2014 FIFA World Cup qualification

== Honours ==
Inter Milan Primavera

- Torneo di Viareggio: 2008
- Campionato Nazionale Allievi: 2008
- Campionato Nazionale Giovanissimi: 2006

Roma

- Coppa Italia runner-up: 2012–13

Individual

- Torneo di Viareggio Best Youngster Award: 2008
- Coppa Italia top goalscorer: 2012–13
