= Emil Krafth =

Swedish footballer (born 1994)

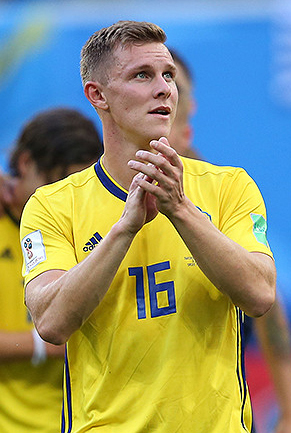
- Krafth with Sweden at the 2018 FIFA World Cup

Personal information
- Full name: Emil Henry Kristoffer Krafth
- Date of birth: 2 August 1994 (age 32)
- Place of birth: Ljungby, Sweden
- Height: 1.84 m (6 ft 0 in)
- Positions: Right-back; centre-back

Youth career
- Lagans AIK

Senior career*
Years	Team	Apps	(Gls)
2010	Lagans AIK	11	(3)
2011	Östers IF	24	(0)
2012–2015	Helsingborgs IF	76	(3)
2015–2019	Bologna	42	(0)
2018–2019	→ Amiens (loan)	35	(1)
2019	Amiens	0	(0)
2019–2026	Newcastle United	84	(1)

International career
2011	Sweden U17	1	(0)
2012–2013	Sweden U19	8	(1)
2012–2016	Sweden U21	16	(1)
2014–2025	Sweden	52	(0)
- * Club domestic league appearances and goals as of 23:20, 2 November 2025 (UTC)

Emil Henry Kristoffer Krafth (Swedish: [ˈeː.mɪl ˈkrɑːft]; born 2 August 1994) is a Swedish professional footballer who plays as a right-back or as a centre-back.

Developed at Lagan, Krafth had played for Öster, Helsingborg and Bologna, also spent time on loan with Amiens, and had a brief permanent spell with the side. In 2019, he signed with English Premier League side Newcastle United.

A full international between 2014 and 2025, Krafth won 52 caps for the Sweden national team. He represented his country at the 2018 FIFA World Cup and UEFA Euro 2020.

== Early life ==
Krafth was born in Ljungby, Kronoberg County. Both of his parents, Pelle and Pernilla, were footballers, and he joined his mother's club, Lagans AIK, at five years old. Krafth was coached by his parents throughout his time at Lagans AIK. He started out playing as a defensive midfielder or striker before switching to defence, eventually playing at right–back.

Krafth has a sister and a brother. When he was fifteen years old, Krafth moved out of his parents’ house to Växjö, attending a football high school there and said it was easy to adapt. Growing up, he supported Manchester United.

== Club career ==
=== Östers IF ===
Krafth began his career at lower-division side Lagans AIK. It was with Lagans AIK that he made his senior debut in 2010, aged just 16. In 2011, he joined Östers IF in Superettan. Krafth debuted for the club at 17 years old, starting the whole game, in a 2–1 win against GIF Sundsvall in the opening game of the season. He quickly became a first team regular for the side, playing in either the defender ad midfield positions and impressed in his first season in the Superettan. For his performance at one point, Krafth was named Tipselit Player of the Month for June. Krafth was also named Sveriges Radio Kronoberg Prize for "Sports Surprise of the Year 2011". At the end of the 2011 season, Krafth made thirty–five appearances in all competitions.

Following this, Krafth was linked a move away from Östers IF, as he went on trials, such as, Rangers and Malmö.

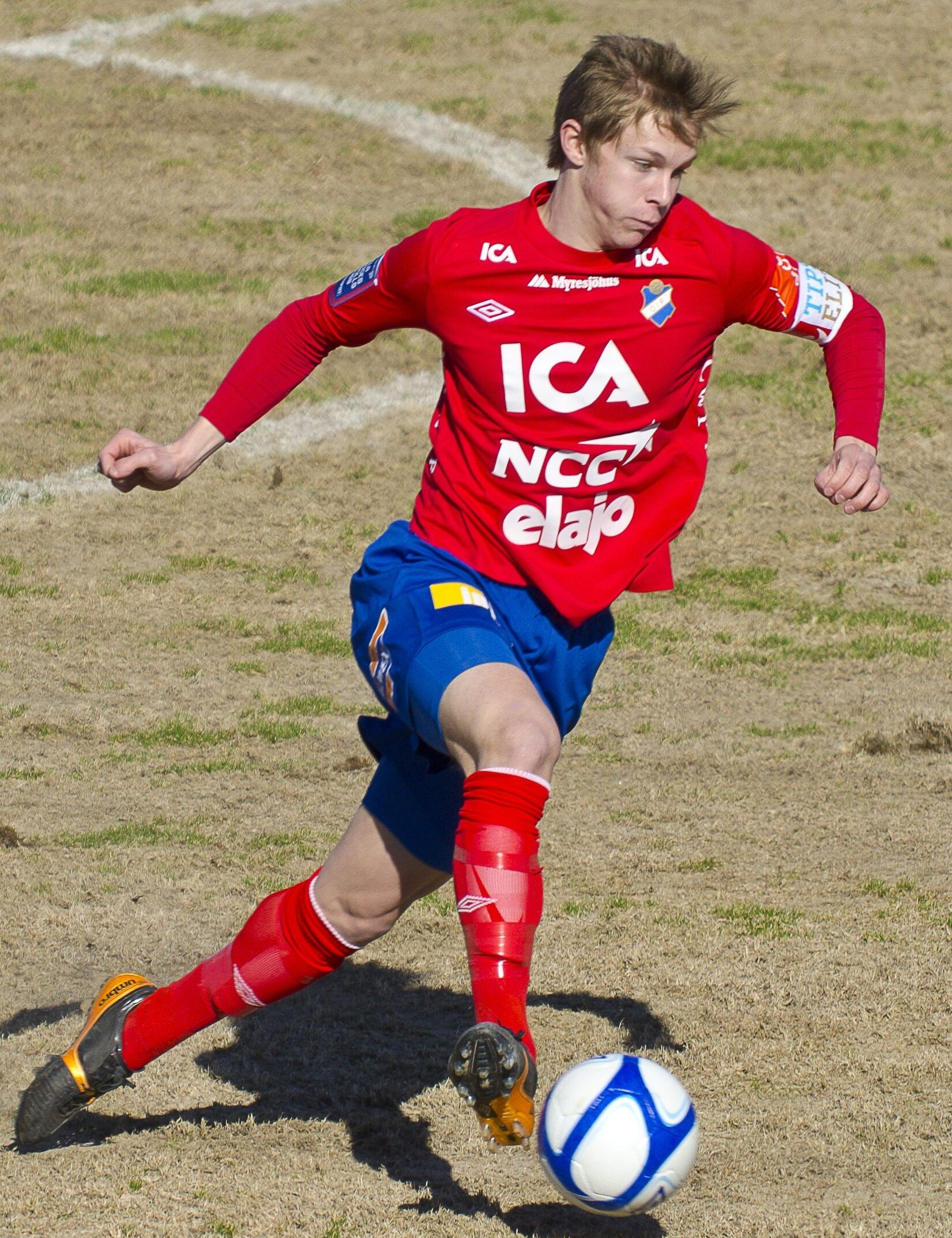
Krafth dribbling the ball while playing for Östers IF in 2011

=== Helsingborgs IF ===
Krafth earned a move to Allsvenskan side Helsingborgs IF on 10 January 2012. Upon joining the club, he was given number fifteen shirt.

Krafth appeared as an unused substitute in Helsingborgs’ first match of the 2012 season, in a 2–0 win over AIK in the Svenska Supercupen. A month later, on 27 April 2012 against Mjällby, he made his Helsingborgs debut, starting the whole game, in a 1–1 draw. After the match, Krafth's performance was praised by Manager Conny Karlsson. He then appeared in the next three matches for the side, keeping two out of the three clean sheets. However, Krafth suffered an injury that kept him out for weeks and didn't make an appearance until on 28 July 2012 against IFK Norrköping, where he set up the club's only goal of the game, losing 2–1. Krafth then made his UEFA Europa League debut, starting a match and played 65 minutes before being substituted, in a 3–1 loss against Levante on 22 November 2012. Throughout the 2012 season, he found his playing his time, mostly from the substitute bench and made six starts for the side. Krafth went on to make fifteen appearances in all competitions when the season ended.

At the start of the 2013 season, Krafth made his first appearance of the season, starting the whole game, in a 1–1 draw against Assyriska in the Svenska Cupen. After suffering a knee injury that he sustained while on international duty, on 18 April 2013 he made his first league appearance of the season, starting the whole game, and set up Helsingborgs’ first goal of the game, in a 4–1 win against IFK Norrköping. Since the start of the 2013 season, Krafth quickly became a first team regular for the side, playing in the right–back position. On 27 June 2013, he scored his first goal for the club, in a 2–1 loss against AIK. In addition, Krafth provided assists on three more time later in the 2013 season. He once helped Helsingborgs keep two clean sheets on two occasions. At the end of the 2013 season, he went on to make thirty–four appearances and scoring once in all competitions.

At the start of the 2014 season, Krafth helped Helsingborgs reach the finals of the Svenska Cupen. However, in the Svenska Cupen Final against Elfsborg, he started in the final, playing in the right–back position, as the club lost 1–0. It was announced on 11 April 2014 that Krafth signed a contract with Helsingborgs, keeping him there until 2016. Since the start of the 2014 season, he continued to be a first team regular for the side, playing in the right–back position. At one point during the 2014 season, Krafth was given the club's vice captaincy. On 3 October 2014, he scored his first goal of the season, in a 4–1 win against Kalmar. Despite missing two matches during the 2014 season, he made thirty–two appearances and scoring once in all competitions.

At the start of the 2014 season, Krafth helped Helsingborgs reach the quarter–finals of the Svenska Cupen, as they were eliminated in the quarter–finals. Since the start of the 2015 season, he continued to be a first team regular for the side, playing in the right–back position. However, Krafth suffered a back injury while training that saw him miss one match. But he made his return, starting a match against Elfsborg on 20 May 2015, scoring in a 2–1 loss. Krafth kept two consecutive clean sheets on two separate occasions. By the time he left the club, Krafth made twelve appearances and scoring once in all competitions.

=== Bologna ===
It was announced on 19 August 2015 that Krafth swapped Sweden for Italy as he joined Serie A outfit Bologna. It came after when Krafth announced his intention to leave Helsingborgs in the summer transfer window. Upon joining the club, he was given a number four shirt.

However, Krafth continued to recover from a back injury that he sustained over the summer. On 24 October 2015 he made his Bologna debut against Carpi, starting a match and played 42 minutes before being substituted, due to a knee injury, as they won 2–1. Following this, it was announced that Krafth was sidelined for the rest of the year after suffering another injury while on international duty with Sweden U21, and continued to do for the first four months of 2016. On 11 April 2016, he made his first appearance in months, coming on as an 85th-minute substitute, in a 1–1 draw against Roma. Krafth made two more appearances later in the 2015–16 season, including a start against Chievo in the last game of the season. At the end of the season, he made four appearances in all competitions. Following this, Krafth said: "I didn't have a lucky season: the recovery from my injury was longer than expected and it kept me out for a long time. However, it was a year in which I learned a lot, especially in terms of mentality. I always hope to train well and play as much as possible in the championship to come, I intend to show that I am a good right back and show you how much I am worth."

Krafth started in the first four league matches of the 2016–17 season in the right–back position before being sent–off for a straight red card in the 81st minute, losing 3–1 against Napoli on 17 September 2016. After serving a one match suspension, he returned to the starting line–up against Inter Milan on 25 September 2016 and played 80 minutes before being substituted, as Bologna drew 1–1. However, his return was short–lived when Krafth was sidelined on two occasions that saw him out for two months. On 6 November 2016, he returned to the starting line–up, starting the whole game, in a 1–1 draw against Roma. Following this, Krafth found himself in and out of the starting eleven for the side, competing with Vasilis Torosidis and Ibrahima Mbaye over the right–back position. He then scored his first goal for Bologna, and set up the club's second goal of the game, in a 4–0 win against Hellas Verona in the fourth round of the Coppa Italia. However, Krafth was sent–off for a straight red card in the last minute, in a 1–1 draw against Cagliari on 29 January 2017. During a 1–1 draw against Genoa on 26 February 2017, he suffered a knee injury and was substituted in the 53rd minute. Initially out in a follow–up match against Lazio, Krafth returned to the starting line–up and started the whole game, in a 2–0 loss. At the end of the 2016–17 season, he made twenty–nine appearances and scoring once in all competitions.

At the start of the 2017–18 season, Krafth was sidelined for two weeks following a muscle injury during the club's pre–season tour. Upon returning from injury, he found himself in the substitute bench, and began competing with Torosidis and Mbaye over the right–back position. Krafth made his first appearance of the season, starting the whole game, in a 3–0 loss against Napoli on 10 September 2017. Following the injury of Torosidis during a match against Atalanta on 22 October 2017, he came on as a 25th-minute substitute and played the rest of the match, as Bologna lost 1–0. Following this, Krafth started in the next four matches in the right–back position before Torosidis returned. At the end of the 2017–18 season, he made twelve appearances in all competitions.

It was later revealed his first team opportunities at Bologna was limited, due to his lack of tactical acumen to succeed in Italy.

=== Amiens ===
On 6 August 2018, Krafth joined Ligue 1 side Amiens on a season-long loan from Bologna.

Krafth made his Amiens debut, coming on as a late substitute, in a 2–1 loss against Montpellier on 18 August 2018. In a follow–up match against Reims, he set up the club's third goal of the game, in a 4–1 win. After the match, Krafth was named L’Equipe Team of the Week. He then scored his first goal for Amiens, in a 3–1 loss against Strasbourg on 22 September 2018. Since making his debut, Krafth quickly established himself in the starting eleven, playing in the right–back position for the club. Later in the 2018–19 season, he later helped Amiens finish in 15th place on the table and secured their survival after a 2–1 victory over already relegated Guingamp.

Despite two matches during the 2018–19 season, he made 35 appearances in the French top flight while on loan. Following this, Krafth joined Amiens on a permanent transfer in June 2019, after the two clubs agreed to a €2m transfer.

=== Newcastle United ===
Krafth signed a four-year deal with Premier League club Newcastle United on 8 August 2019 after the side reached a £5m deal with Amiens. Upon joining the club, he said: "It feels really good. It's been a busy couple of days, but finally I'm here. I'm very happy to sign for Newcastle and I can't wait to start training with the guys. When a Premier League team wants to sign you, of course you are happy. I know Newcastle is a big club, so I'm very happy to sign here and to be here right now. It's a good moment in my career to take a step forward. The plans Newcastle had for me, I felt like they was fitting me perfectly, so that was why I chose Newcastle."

He made his debut for the club on 19 August 2019, as Newcastle were defeated 3–1 by Norwich City. Krafth then made five more starts for the next two months for the side. Following this, he was dropped to the substitute bench when manager Steve Bruce began using Javier Manquillo and DeAndre Yedlin. On 5 December 2019, Krafth made his first appearance for Newcastle United in two months, coming on as a late substitute in a 2–0 win against Sheffield United. He then started in the third round of the FA Cup against Rochdale, as they drew 1–1. However, Krafth suffered ankle injury against Everton on 21 January 2020 and was substituted in the 28th minute. When the season was suspended because of the COVID-19 pandemic, he had made fourteen appearances for Newcastle United and recovered from the injury. Once the season resumed behind closed doors, Krafth didn't make an appearance until on 1 July 2020, when he started the whole game in a 4–1 win against Bournemouth. This was followed up by setting up the club's first goal of the game, in a 2–2 draw against West Ham United. Following this, he appeared in the four out of the last five remaining league matches. At the end of the 2019–20 season, Krafth made twenty appearances in all competitions.

On 14 May 2021, Krafth scored his first Newcastle goal in a 3–4 home league defeat to champions Manchester City.

On 25 July 2022, Krafth extended his contract with Newcastle until June 2024.

On 14 February 2024, Krafth signed a new one-year deal with Newcastle, running until June 2025.

On 20 February 2025, Krafth extended his contract with the club once again, signing a one-year deal until the end of the 2025–26 season. He appeared as a substitute in the 2025 League Cup Final when Newcastle won their first trophy since 1969, and first domestic title since 1955.

On 16 May 2026, Newcastle announced that Krafth would depart the club when his contract expired on 30 June.

== International career ==
=== Youth career ===
In May 2011, Krafth was called up to the Sweden U17 squad for the first time. He only made one appearances for the U17 side.

In August 2012, Krafth was called up to the Sweden U19 squad for the first time. He then scored on his debut, winning 2–0 against Finland U19 on 14 August 2012. Krafth went on to make eight appearances and scoring once for the U19 side.

In May 2012, Krafth was called up to the Sweden U21 squad for the first time. Krafth became the fifth youngest person ever to play in the Sweden U21 team, being 17 years and 309 days old when he played in Sweden U21s' match against Malta on 6 June 2012. Krafth then kept three consecutive clean sheets between 5 June 2014 and 5 September 2014 against Iceland U21, Slovakia U21 and Greece U21, all of them were wins. However, during a 2–2 draw against Denmark U21 on 11 June 2015, he suffered a back injury that kept saw him miss the UEFA European Under-21 Championship and Sweden U21 went on to win the tournament. A year later on 3 June 2016 against Georgia U21, Krafth scored the U21 side's second goal of the game, in a 3–2 win, which turns out to be his last appearance for Sweden U21. He went on to make sixteen appearances and scoring once for the U21 side.

=== Senior career ===
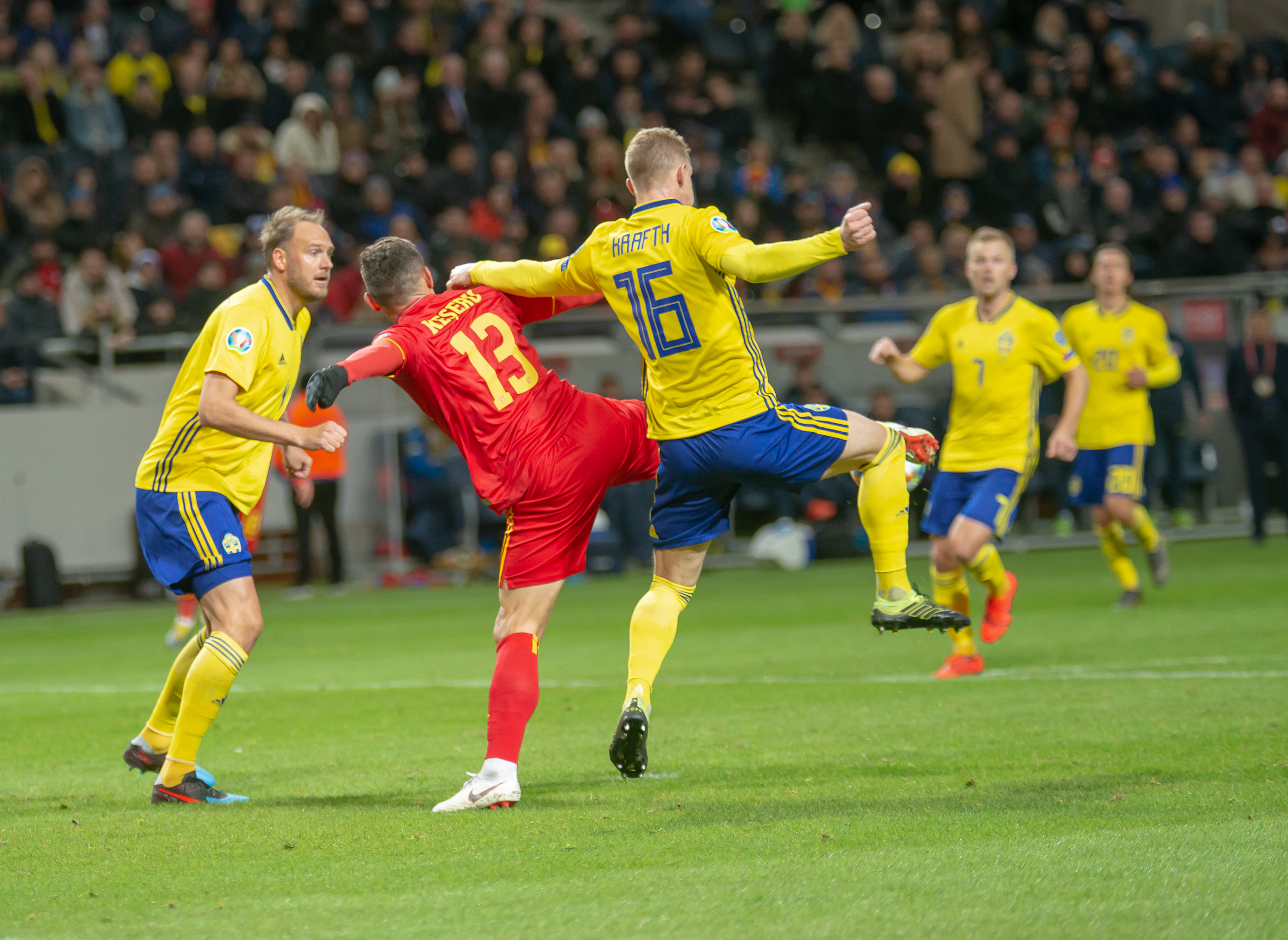
Krafth defending during Sweden's match against Romania in the UEFA Euro 2020 qualifying round.

In January 2014, Krafth was called up to the Sweden's squad for the first time. He made his debut for Sweden against Moldova, coming on as an 85th-minute substitute, and set up the national's side goal for Erton Fejzullahu, who scored twice, in a 2–1 win on 17 January 2014.

After a two-year absence from the national team, Krafth was called up to the Sweden's squad for the second time, appearing as an unused substitute against Netherlands and Luxembourg. On 10 October 2016, he started against Bulgaria and set up the national side's second goal of the game, in a 3–0 win. The following year on 10 November 2017, Krafth played 83 minutes in the 2018 FIFA World Cup Second Round Play-off first leg, as Sweden won 1–0 against Italy at the Friends Arena. On 13 November 2017, he appeared as an unused substitute in the game where Sweden held on to force a goalless draw in the second leg at the San Siro to defeat the Italians 1–0 on aggregate in their Russia 2018 World Cup play-off.

In May 2018, Krafth was named in Sweden's 23-man squad for the 2018 World Cup in Russia. Despite suffering a fever, he appeared in the substitute bench in the national side's first three matches. Krafth made his tournament debut, coming on as an 82nd-minute substitute, in a 1–0 win against Switzerland in the Round of 16. Following a suspension of Mikael Lustig, he started in the quarter–finals against England and played 85 minutes in the match before being substituted, as they lost 2–0, eliminating Sweden from the tournament. After the match, his performance was criticised by ESPN and Expressen. Following this, Krafth appeared three more times by the end of the year.

Krafth was included in Sweden's 26-man squad for UEFA Euro 2020. He served as a back-up player for Lustig at right-back.

On 6 November 2026, the Swedish Football Association announced that Krafth had retired from international football. He won 52 caps between 2014 and 2025.

== Personal life ==
Krafth is in a long-term relationship with Lina Lundqvist. In November 2019, he became a first time father when Lundqvist gave birth to a baby girl.

In addition to speaking Swedish, Krafth speaks English and Italian.

== Career statistics ==
=== Club ===
As of match played 2 November 2025

Appearances and goals by club, season and competition
Club	Season	League			National cup (Note: Includes Swedish Cup, Coppa Italia, Coupe de France, FA Cup)		League cup (Note: Includes EFL Cup)		Europe		Total	
Club	Season	Division	Apps	Goals	Apps	Goals	Apps	Goals	Apps	Goals	Apps	Goals
Östers IF	2011	Superettan	24	0	2	0	—		—		26	0
Helsingborgs IF	2012	Allsvenskan	9	0	4	0	—		2 (Note: Appearances in UEFA Europa League)	0	15	0
Helsingborgs IF	2013	Allsvenskan	27	1	7	0	—		—		34	1
Helsingborgs IF	2014	Allsvenskan	28	1	4	0	—		—		32	1
Helsingborgs IF	2015	Allsvenskan	12	1	0	0	—		—		12	1
Helsingborgs IF	Total		76	3	15	0	—		2	0	93	3
Bologna	2015–16	Serie A	4	0	—		—		—		4	0
Bologna	2016–17	Serie A	26	0	3	1	—		—		29	1
Bologna	2017–18	Serie A	12	0	0	0	—		—		12	0
Bologna	Total		42	0	3	1	—		—		45	1
Amiens (loan)	2018–19	Ligue 1	35	1	1	0	0	0	—		36	1
Newcastle United	2019–20	Premier League	17	0	2	0	1	0	—		20	0
Newcastle United	2020–21	Premier League	16	1	1	0	3	0	—		20	1
Newcastle United	2021–22	Premier League	20	0	1	0	1	0	—		22	0
Newcastle United	2022–23	Premier League	1	0	0	0	1	0	—		2	0
Newcastle United	2023–24	Premier League	17	0	2	0	2	0	0	0	21	0
Newcastle United	2024–25	Premier League	12	0	1	0	5	0	—		18	0
Newcastle United	2025–26	Premier League	1	0	0	0	2	0	0	0	3	0
Newcastle United	Total		84	1	7	0	15	0	0	0	106	1
Career total			261	5	28	1	15	0	2	0	306	6

=== International ===
Appearances and goals by national team and year
National team	Year	Apps	Goals
Sweden	2014	3	0
Sweden	2015	1	0
Sweden	2016	3	0
Sweden	2017	4	0
Sweden	2018	7	0
Sweden	2019	3	0
Sweden	2020	3	0
Sweden	2021	14	0
Sweden	2022	4	0
Sweden	2023	2	0
Sweden	2024	6	0
Sweden	2025	2	0
Total		52	0

== Honours ==
Newcastle United

- EFL Cup: 2024–25
