= Aaron Tabacchi =

Italian footballer (born 1998)

Personal information
- Full name: Aaron Mattia Tabacchi
- Date of birth: 26 June 1998 (age 28)
- Place of birth: Bologna, Italy
- Height: 1.78 m (5 ft 10 in)
- Position: Forward

Youth career
- Bologna

Senior career*
Years	Team	Apps	(Gls)
2016–2019	Bologna	1	(0)
2017	→ Ravenna (loan)	3	(0)
2019	→ Imolese (loan)	0	(0)
- * Club domestic league appearances and goals as of 1 July 2019

Aaron Mattia Tabacchi (born 26 June 1998) is an Italian football player.

== Club career ==
He made his professional debut in the Serie A for Bologna on 15 May 2016 as an 83rd-minute substitute for Emanuele Giaccherini in a game against Chievo.

On 31 January 2019, he was loaned to Imolese.
