= Ladislav Krejčí (footballer, born 1992) =

Czech footballer

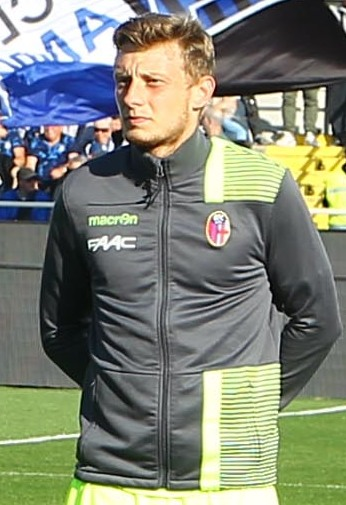
- Krejčí with Bologna in April 2017

Personal information
- Full name: Ladislav Krejčí
- Date of birth: 5 July 1992 (age 34)
- Place of birth: Prague, Czechoslovakia
- Height: 1.80 m (5 ft 11 in)
- Position: Left winger

Team information
- Current team: Teplice
- Number: 14

Youth career
- FK Podolí
- Sparta Prague

Senior career*
Years	Team	Apps	(Gls)
2010–2016	Sparta Prague	131	(36)
2016–2020	Bologna	76	(2)
2020–2023	Sparta Prague	36	(4)
2023–2025	Hradec Králové	34	(2)
2025–	Teplice	25	(1)

International career
2007–2008	Czech Republic U16	12	(1)
2008	Czech Republic U17	5	(0)
2009	Czech Republic U18	2	(0)
2009–2011	Czech Republic U19	22	(5)
2011–2015	Czech Republic U21	8	(1)
2012–2019	Czech Republic	41	(5)
- * Club domestic league appearances and goals as of 27 May 2026

Ladislav Krejčí (Czech pronunciation: [ˈlaɟɪslaf ˈkrɛjtʃiː]; born 5 July 1992) is a Czech professional footballer who plays as a left-winger for Teplice. A full international, Krejčí scored five goals in 41 appearances for the Czech Republic between 2012 and 2019.

== Club career ==
On 7 July 2016, Krejčí joined Bologna permanently from Sparta Prague for €4.000.000.

On 4 August 2020, Krejčí returned to Sparta Prague permanently from Bologna. He later joined Hradec Králové on 19 June 2023. He played regularly for Hradec Králové in the 2023–24 season but sustained an injury in the summer of 2024. In the first half of the 2024–25 season, he started just one game for the club, among seven appearances in total. In January 2025, Krejčí joined Teplice.

== International career ==
Krejčí was part of the Czech Under-19 team that finished as runners-up in the 2011 UEFA European Under-19 Championship, scoring in the final which his team eventually lost 3–2 to Spain.

=== Senior ===
On 6 November 2012, Krejčí received his first Czech senior team call-up by coach Michal Bílek to face Slovakia in Olomouc, He made his debut in the match, playing 67 minutes of the game.

On 6 February 2013, Krejčí scored his first international goal in a friendly match against Turkey, resulting in a 2–0 victory. On 22 March, he started in the 2014 FIFA World Cup qualification match against Denmark, where the Czechs lost 0–3.

Krejčí was included in the final 23-man squad for the UEFA Euro 2016 by coach Pavel Vrba. Before Euro 2016, his first major tournament, Krejčí had amassed 23 appearances and scored 3 goals for the Czech Republic.

== Career statistics ==
=== Club ===
As of matches played on 8 November 2020.

Appearances and goals by club, season and competition
Club	Season	Division	League		Cup		Continental		Other		Total	
Club	Season	Division	Apps	Goals	Apps	Goals	Apps	Goals	Apps	Goals	Apps	Goals
Sparta Prague	2009–10	Fortuna Liga	3	0	1	0	0	0	—		4	0
Sparta Prague	2010–11	Fortuna Liga	2	0	0	0	1	0	—		3	0
Sparta Prague	2011–12	Fortuna Liga	22	6	6	3	0	0	—		28	9
Sparta Prague	2012–13	Fortuna Liga	25	4	5	1	9 (Note: Appearances in the Europa League)	2	—		34	4
Sparta Prague	2013–14	Fortuna Liga	25	8	8	1	1	0	—		34	9
Sparta Prague	2015–16	Fortuna Liga	27	4	3	0	15 (Note: Two appearances and two goals in the Champions League, thirteen appearances and two goals in the Europa League)	4	—		45	8
Sparta Prague	2020–21	Fortuna Liga	5	1	0	0	2	1	0	0	7	2
Sparta Prague	Total		109	23	23	5	28	7	0	0	155	32
Bologna	2016–17	Serie A	37	1	1	1	—		—		36	1
Bologna	2017–18	Serie A	12	0	2	0	0	0	—		14	0
Bologna	2018–19	Serie A	18	0	0	0	—		—		18	0
Bologna	2019–20	Serie A	9	1	0	0	—		—		0	0
Bologna	Total		76	2	3	1	0	0	0	0	0	0
Career total			160	10	11	0	41	0	1	0	205	10

=== International goals ===
Scores and results list Czech Republic's goal tally first, score column indicates score after each Krejčí goal.

List of international goals scored by Ladislav Krejčí
No.	Date	Venue	Opponent	Score	Result	Competition
1	6 February 2013	Manisa 19 Mayıs Stadium, Manisa, Turkey	Turkey	1–0	2–0	Friendly
2	13 October 2014	Astana Arena, Astana, Kazakhstan	Kazakhstan	3–0	4–2	UEFA Euro 2016 qualification
3	13 November 2015	Městský stadion, Ostrava, Czech Republic	Serbia	3–1	4–1	Friendly
4	17 November 2015	Stadion Miejski, Wrocław, Poland	Poland	1–2	1–3	Friendly
5	31 August 2016	Městský stadion, Mladá Boleslav, Czech Republic	Armenia	1–0	3–0	Friendly

== Honours ==
=== Club ===
Sparta Prague

- Czech First League: 2009–10, 2013–14
- Czech Cup: 2013–14

=== International ===
Czech Republic U19

- UEFA European Under-19 Championship: runner-up 2011

=== Individual ===
- Talent of the Year: 2011
