= Luca Rizzo =

Italian footballer

Personal information
- Date of birth: 24 April 1992 (age 34)
- Place of birth: Genoa, Italy
- Height: 1.88 m (6 ft 2 in)
- Position: Midfielder

Youth career
- Sampdoria

Senior career*
Years	Team	Apps	(Gls)
2011–2015	Sampdoria	15	(1)
2011–2012	→ Pergocrema (loan)	12	(0)
2012	→ Foligno (loan)	17	(0)
2012–2013	→ Pisa (loan)	23	(2)
2013–2014	→ Modena (loan)	35	(3)
2015–2016	→ Bologna (loan)	23	(0)
2016–2020	Bologna	12	(0)
2017	→ SPAL (loan)	11	(2)
2018	→ Atalanta (loan)	1	(0)
2018–2019	→ Foggia (loan)	5	(0)
2019	→ Carpi (loan)	0	(0)
2019–2020	→ Livorno (loan)	4	(0)
2021–2022	Pro Vercelli	20	(0)
2023	SC Ligorna 1922	6	(0)
2023	Lavagnese	7	(0)
- * Club domestic league appearances and goals as of 20:06, 23 January 2024 (UTC)

Luca Rizzo (born 24 April 1992) is an Italian professional footballer who plays as a midfielder.

== Career ==
=== Sampdoria ===
A youth product of hometown club Sampdoria, Rizzo had spent 3 seasons on loan to lower divisions, for Lega Pro Prima Divisione clubs Pergocrema and Foligno in 2011–12 season; Pisa in 2012–13 season.

On 9 July 2013, he was spotted by Serie B club Modena in a temporary deal with an option to co-own the player. Modena exercised the option after a successful season, however Sampdoria also exercised the counter-option.

=== Bologna ===
On 30 June 2015, Rizzo joined Serie A newcomers Bologna in a temporary deal with an obligation to buy at the end of the season, for €5.240 million.

On 31 January 2019, he joined Carpi on loan.

On 9 August 2019, he joined Livorno on loan.

=== Pro Vercelli ===
After not playing in the first half of the 2020–21 season, on 27 January 2021 he signed with Serie C club Pro Vercelli.

=== Lavagnese ===
On 19 August 2023, Rizzo signed with Serie D side Lavagnese. On 24 November 2023, after 8 appearances for the club, it was confirmed, that Rizzo's contract had been terminated.
