= Domenico Maietta =

Italian footballer (born 1982)

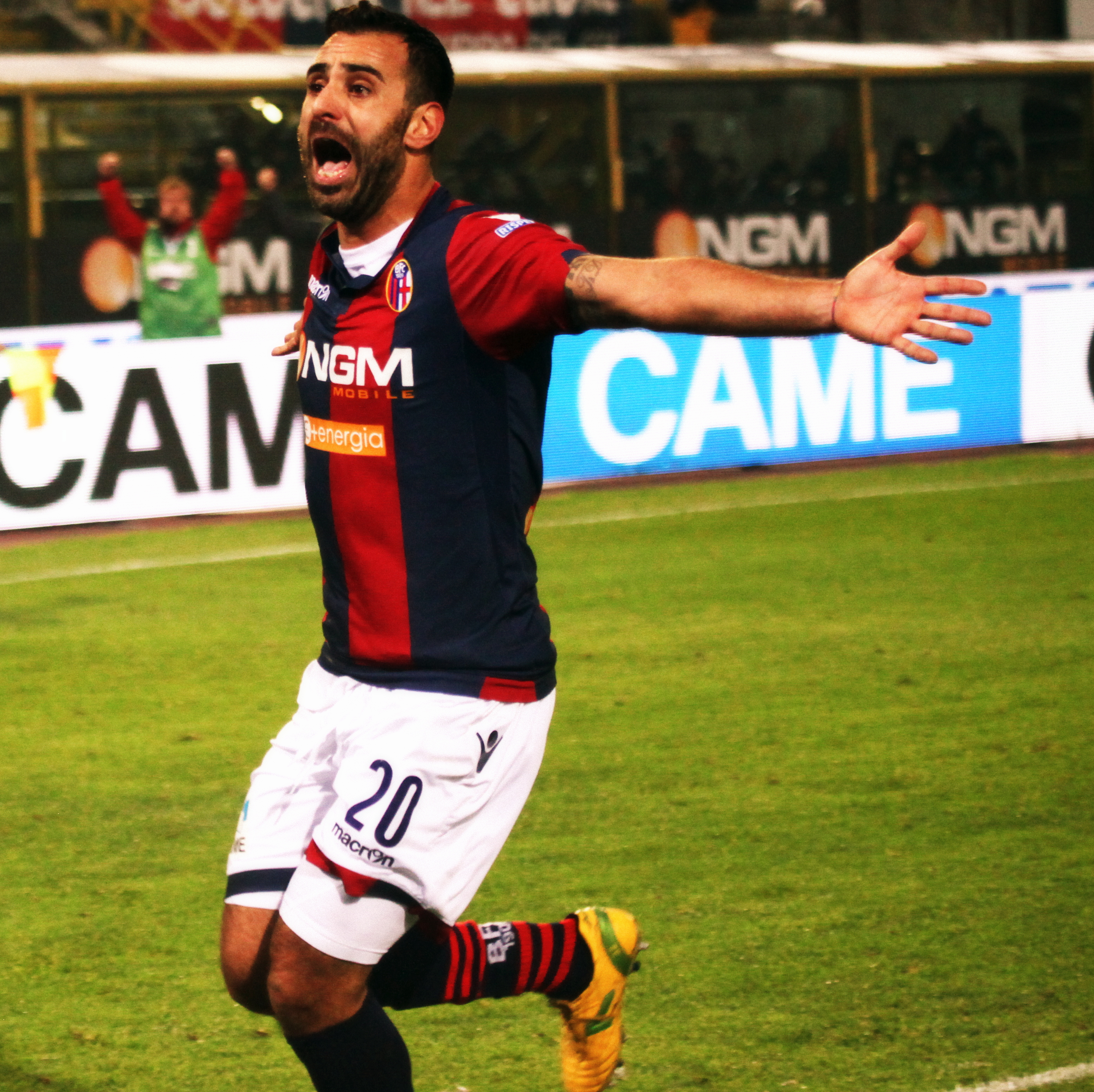

Personal information
- Date of birth: 3 August 1982 (age 44)
- Place of birth: Cariati, province of Cosenza, Italy
- Height: 1.85 m (6 ft 1 in)
- Position: Centre-back

Senior career*
Years	Team	Apps	(Gls)
2000–2001	Juventus	0	(0)
2001–2002	L'Aquila	0	(0)
2002–2003	Triestina	5	(0)
2003	Messina	8	(0)
2003–2004	Avellino	12	(0)
2004	Perugia	0	(0)
2004–2007	Crotone	77	(0)
2007–2008	Avellino	28	(0)
2008–2009	Crotone	8	(0)
2009–2010	Frosinone	39	(0)
2010–2014	Hellas Verona	119	(5)
2014–2018	Bologna	90	(1)
2018–2020	Empoli	65	(1)
- * Club domestic league appearances and goals

Domenico Maietta (born 3 August 1982) is an Italian former professional footballer who played as a defender.

== Career ==
Although Maietta was once included in the Serie A rosters of Juventus and Perugia in the early 2000s, he did not make his Serie A debut until 2013, after being promoted with Hellas Verona. He made his Serie B debut with Triestina during the 2002–03 season.

Maietta missed 3 weeks in 2016–17 season.

On 1 September 2020 Empoli announced his retirement from playing and that he joined the club staff.
