= Marios Oikonomou =

Greek footballer (1992–2026)

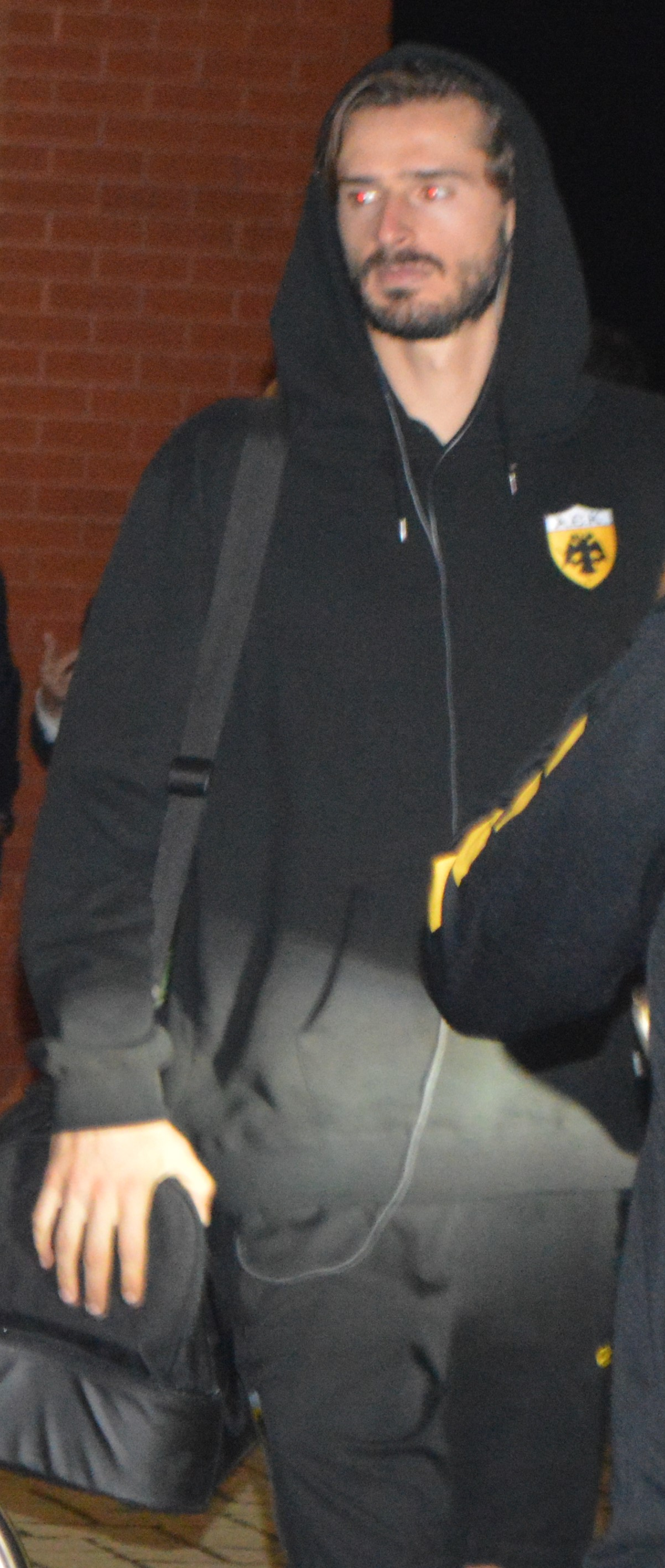
- Oikonomou in 2018

Personal information
- Date of birth: 6 October 1992
- Place of birth: Ioannina, Greece
- Date of death: 1 June 2026 (aged 33)
- Place of death: Ioannina, Greece
- Height: 1.89 m (6 ft 2 in)
- Position: Centre-back

Youth career
- 2010–2011: PAS Giannina

Senior career*
Years	Team	Apps	(Gls)
2011–2013	PAS Giannina	17	(0)
2013–2014	Cagliari	1	(0)
2014–2019	Bologna	71	(4)
2017–2018	→ SPAL (loan)	4	(0)
2018	→ Bari (loan)	3	(0)
2018–2019	→ AEK Athens (loan)	21	(2)
2019–2020	AEK Athens	25	(1)
2020–2022	Copenhagen	13	(0)
2023	Sampdoria	6	(0)
2023–2024	Panetolikos	20	(1)
Total		181	(8)

International career
2012	Greece U21	1	(0)
2016–2018	Greece	6	(0)
- * Club domestic league appearances and goals

Marios Oikonomou (Greek: Μάριος Οικονόμου; 6 October 1992 – 1 June 2026) was a Greek professional footballer who played as a centre-back.

== Club career ==
=== PAS Giannina ===
Born in Ioannina, Oikonomou began playing football with PAS Giannina. He signed his first professional contract in January 2011. On 14 November 2012, he made his debut for the Greece U21 in a friendly match against Austria U21. He made 23 appearances for the club in total.

=== Cagliari ===
After a strong 2012–13 season with PAS Giannina, Oikonomou signed a contract with Cagliari, a team in Serie A, the top league in Italy. He was the first ever player in the history of PAS Giannina who managed to sign directly a contract with a foreign club. His former club received €500,000 and later a small percentage of a future resale. On 6 April 2014, he made his debut with the club in a home loss against Roma.

=== Bologna ===
On 1 July 2014, Oikonomou signed a contract with Bologna in Serie B, in a transfer deal which involved striker Alessandro Capello, who moved permanently from Bologna to Cagliari. Oikonomou opted for this transfer as he had made very few appearances for Cagliari during the previous season. On 23 September 2014, he made his debut for the club, scoring the winning goal in a 1–0 away win against Ternana Calcio. He had a very good season with Bologna which attracted attention of several other Italian clubs, such as Lazio and Hellas Verona.

Despite his initial strong performances on the pitch, Oikonomou playing time dwindled after the club acquired services of another centre-back, Daniele Gastaldello in March 2015.

On 9 June 2015, Oikonomou contributed to Bologna's return to Serie A, just one-year after their relegation, in a dramatic 1–1 draw in the play-offs against Pescara Calcio.

==== Loan to SPAL ====
On 3 July 2017, Serie A newcomers SPAL secured a deal for Oikonomou. He joined the club on a loan, with SPAL's obligation to buy him from Bologna if the club managed to avoid relegation. On 12 August 2017, he made his debut for SPAL in a home Coppa Italia 1–0 win game against Renate.

==== Loan to Bari ====
On 11 January 2018, it was announced that Oikonomou was to join Bari until the end of the season. On 27 January 2018, he made his debut in a 4–0 home loss game against Empoli.

==== Loan to AEK Athens ====
On 28 June 2018, Bologna loaned him out for another season, this time to AEK Athens. By the end of the first half of the season, AEK was already considering the option of making the transfer permanent. The club was reportedly prepared to pay a transfer fee in the range of €700,000.

=== AEK Athens ===
Very soon after that, on 22 January 2019, Oikonomou became an AEK Athens player, penning a contract with the club until the end of the 2021–22 season. On 31 March 2019, he scored his first goal for the club in a 4–0 home win game against Panetolikos.

=== Copenhagen ===
On 3 September 2020, Oikonomou joined Copenhagen for a reported €1 million fee, on a two-year contract. In the 2020–21 season, he helped the club reach third place in the Danish Superliga and qualify for the Europa League play-off round. The following season, Copenhagen won the league title and qualified for the UEFA Champions League. On 12 October 2022, Oikonomou's contract was terminated by mutual consent.

=== Sampdoria ===
After several months of free agency, Oikonomou joined Sampdoria on 17 February 2023, on a short-term deal until the end of the season.

== International career ==
In 2012, Oikonomou was capped by Greece U21s. On 16 March 2016, he was called for the first time to play for the senior team in two friendly matches against Iceland and Montenegro. On 24 March 2016, he made his debut with the senior side as a substitute for Kostas Manolas in a 2–1 home friendly game against Montenegro.

== Death ==
On 23 May 2026, Oikonomou was involved in a serious road incident in his hometown of Ioannina when his motorcycle collided with a car which was attempting an illegal u-turn through a median opening. He was admitted to an intensive care unit, where his condition was closely monitored. He died on 1 June 2026, at the age of 33.

== Career statistics ==
=== Club ===
Appearances and goals by club, season and competition
Club	Season	League			National cup (Note: Includes Greek Cup, Coppa Italia, Danish Cup)		Continental		Other		Total	
Club	Season	Division	Apps	Goals	Apps	Goals	Apps	Goals	Apps	Goals	Apps	Goals
PAS Giannina	2010–11	Football League Greece	0	0	0	0	—		—		0	0
PAS Giannina	2011–12	Super League Greece	0	0	2	0	—		—		2	0
PAS Giannina	2012–13	Super League Greece	17	0	4	0	—		—		21	0
PAS Giannina	Total		17	0	2	0	0	0	0	0	23	0
Cagliari	2013–14	Serie A	1	0	0	0	—		—		1	0
Bologna	2014–15	Serie B	33	4	1	0	—		—		34	4
Bologna	2015–16	Serie A	20	0	1	0	—		—		21	0
Bologna	2016–17	Serie A	17	0	2	0	—		—		19	0
Bologna	Total		70	4	4	0	0	0	0	0	74	4
SPAL (loan)	2017–18	Serie A	4	0	2	0	—		—		6	0
Bari (loan)	2017–18	Serie B	3	0	0	0	—		—		3	0
AEK Athens (loan)	2018–19	Super League Greece	9	0	1	0	8 (Note: Appearances in UEFA Champions League)	0	0	0	18	0
AEK Athens	2018–19	Super League Greece	12	2	6	1	—		0	0	18	3
AEK Athens	2019–20	Super League Greece	25	1	2	0	1 (Note: Appearance in UEFA Europa League)	0	0	0	28	1
AEK Athens	Total		37	3	8	1	1	0	0	0	46	4
Copenhagen	2020–21	Danish Superliga	8	0	1	0	1	0	0	0	10	0
Copenhagen	2021–22	Danish Superliga	5	0	0	0	4 (Note: Appearances in UEFA Europa Conference League)	0	0	0	9	0
Copenhagen	Total		13	0	1	0	6	0	0	0	19	0
Sampdoria	2022–23	Serie A	6	0	—		—		—		6	0
Career total			158	7	22	1	15	0	0	0	194	8

=== International ===
Appearances and goals by national team and year
National team	Year	Apps	Goals
Greece	2016	4	0
Greece	2017	0	0
Greece	2018	2	0
Total		6	0

== Honours ==
Copenhagen

- Danish Superliga: 2021–22
- The Atlantic Cup runner-up: 2022
