= Godfred Donsah =

Ghanaian professional footballer

Personal information
- Date of birth: 7 June 1996 (age 30)
- Place of birth: Accra, Ghana
- Height: 1.75 m (5 ft 9 in)
- Position: Midfielder

Team information
- Current team: Ostiamare
- Number: 30

Youth career
- DC United Agogo
- 2012–2013: Palermo

Senior career*
Years	Team	Apps	(Gls)
2013–2014	Verona	1	(0)
2014–2015	Cagliari	21	(2)
2015–2021	Bologna	67	(4)
2019–2020	→ Cercle Brugge (loan)	19	(0)
2020–2021	→ Çaykur Rizespor (loan)	24	(1)
2021–2022	Crotone	14	(1)
2022–2023	Yeni Malatyaspor	27	(0)
2023–2024	Şanlıurfaspor	11	(0)
2024–2025	Chieti	42	(3)
2025–	Ostiamare	13	(2)

International career^{‡}
2015	Ghana U20	4	(0)
2017–	Ghana	1	(0)
- * Club domestic league appearances and goals as of 1 March 2026 ‡ National team caps and goals as of 30 May 2018

Godfred Donsah (born 7 June 1996) is a Ghanaian professional footballer who plays as a midfielder for Italian Serie D club Ostiamare.

== Club career ==
Born in Accra, Donsah made his senior debuts with local DC United Agogo before signing a contract with Palermo. Before signing with Palermo, he had trials at Roma, but nothing came of it. He joined Verona in summer 2013.

Donsah made his first team – and Serie A – debut on 19 April 2014, coming on as a substitute in a 2–1 win at Atalanta.

On 17 July 2014, he joined Cagliari for a fee of €2.16 million.

On 24 August 2015, Bologna announced the signing of Donsah on loan with a conditional obligation to buy if Donsah made his debut, for a total fee of €7 million (€2.5M+€4.5M). Donsah signed a four-year contract. Donsah made his debut on 29 August, a match losing to Sassuolo 1–0.

On 1 October 2020, Donsah joined Turkish Süper Lig club Çaykur Rizespor on loan for the 2020–21 season.

On 27 August 2021, Donsah terminated his contract with Bologna and then moved outright to Crotone, with whom he signed a two-year contract. He left for Yeni Malatyaspor in Turkey in January 2022.

== Career statistics ==
As of 31 May 2019

Appearances and goals by club, season and competition
Club	Season	League			National Cup		Continental		Other		Total	
Club	Season	Division	Apps	Goals	Apps	Goals	Apps	Goals	Apps	Goals	Apps	Goals
Hellas Verona	2013–14	Serie A	1	0	0	0	—		—		1	0
Cagliari	2014–15	Serie A	21	2	2	0	—		—		23	2
Bologna	2015–16	Serie A	20	2	0	0	—		—		20	2
Bologna	2016–17	Serie A	13	0	3	2	—		—		16	2
Bologna	2017–18	Serie A	28	2	0	0	—		—		28	2
Bologna	2018–19	Serie A	6	0	1	0	—		—		7	0
Bologna	Total		67	4	4	2	0	0	0	0	71	6
Career total			89	6	6	2	0	0	0	0	95	8
