= Alex Ferrari (footballer) =

Italian footballer (born 1994)

Personal information
- Date of birth: 1 July 1994 (age 32)
- Place of birth: Modena, Italy
- Height: 1.91 m (6 ft 3 in)
- Position: Defender

Team information
- Current team: Sampdoria
- Number: 25

Youth career
- 1998–2002: Modena Est
- 2002–2013: Bologna

Senior career*
Years	Team	Apps	(Gls)
2013–2019	Bologna	33	(0)
2014	→ Crotone (loan)	2	(0)
2017–2018	→ Hellas Verona (loan)	39	(1)
2018–2019	→ Sampdoria (loan)	6	(0)
2019–	Sampdoria	83	(1)
2023	→ Cremonese (loan)	16	(0)

International career
2015	Italy U20	1	(0)
2016–2017	Italy U21	7	(0)
- * Club domestic league appearances and goals as of 13 May 2026

Alex Ferrari (born 1 July 1994) is an Italian professional footballer who plays as a defender for Serie B club Sampdoria. Mainly a centre-back, he can also play as a right-back.

== Club career ==
Ferrari was born in Modena. He played for lowly Modena Est, before joining Bologna's youth setup in 2002, aged eight, and was promoted to the Primavera squad in the mid–2011.

On 3 December 2013, Ferrari made his first-team debut, coming on as a second-half substitute in a 1–2 home loss against Siena, for the season's Coppa Italia. On 14 January of the following year he was loaned to Crotone.

In January 2017 he signed a new 4 1/2-year contract with Bologna. He moved on loan to Hellas Verona on 27 January 2017, lasting until the end of the season. On 12 July 2017, his loan at Verona was extended until June 2018, with an obligation to buy.

On 13 June 2018, Ferrari signed for Serie A club Sampdoria, on loan until 30 June 2019 with an option to buy. The deal was later turned permanent. On 2 January 2023, he joined fellow Serie A club Cremonese on loan until the end of the 2022–23 season.

== International career ==
Ferrari made his debut with the Italy U21 on 2 June 2016, in a friendly match against France.

In June 2017, he was included in the Italy under-21 squad for the 2017 UEFA European Under-21 Championship by manager Luigi Di Biagio. He made his only appearance of the tournament In Italy's second group match on 21 June, a 3–1 defeat to Czech Republic. Italy were eliminated in the semi-finals following a 3–1 defeat to Spain on 27 June.

== Career statistics ==
=== Club ===
As of match played 15 February 2025

Appearances and goals by club, season and competition
Club	Season	League			National Cup		Continental		Other		Total	
Club	Season	Division	Apps	Goals	Apps	Goals	Apps	Goals	Apps	Goals	Apps	Goals
Bologna	2013–14	Serie A	0	0	1	0	—		—		1	0
Bologna	2014–15	Serie B	10	0	1	0	—		2 (Note: Appearances in Serie B promotion play-offs)	0	13	0
Bologna	2015–16	Serie A	21	0	1	0	—		—		22	0
Bologna	2016–17	Serie A	1	0	0	0	—		—		1	0
Bologna	Total		32	0	3	0	—		2	0	37	0
Crotone (loan)	2013–14	Serie B	2	0	—		—		—		2	0
Hellas Verona (loan)	2016–17	Serie B	14	0	—		—		—		14	0
Hellas Verona (loan)	2017–18	Serie A	25	1	2	0	—		—		27	1
Hellas Verona (loan)	Total		39	1	2	0	—		—		41	1
Sampdoria (loan)	2018–19	Serie A	6	0	1	0	—		—		7	0
Sampdoria	2019–20	Serie A	12	0	1	0	—		—		13	0
Sampdoria	2020–21	Serie A	12	0	1	0	—		—		13	0
Sampdoria	2021–22	Serie A	23	1	1	0	—		—		24	1
Sampdoria	2022–23	Serie A	12	0	2	0	—		—		14	0
Sampdoria	2023–24	Serie B	3	0	1	0	—		0	0	4	0
Sampdoria	2024–25	Serie B	6	0	0	0	—		—		6	0
Sampdoria	Total		74	1	7	0	—		—		81	1
Cremonese (loan)	2022–23	Serie A	16	0	2	0	—		—		18	0
Career total			163	2	15	0	0	0	2	0	180	2
