= List of Italian football transfers summer 2009 (July) =

This is a list of Italian football transfers for the 2009–10 season. Only moves from Serie A and Serie B are listed.

The summer transfer window will run from the end of the 2008–09 season, with a few transfers taking place prior to the season's complete end. The window will close on August 31. The mid-season transfer window will open on January 1, 2010, and run for the entire month, until January 31. Players without a club may join one, either during or in between transfer windows.

== Summer transfer window (July) ==
Date	Name	Nat	Moving from	Moving to	Fee
9 February 2009^{1}	Agostino Garofalo	Italy	Grosseto	Siena	Free
12 February 2009	Marco Di Vaio	Italy	Genoa	Bologna	Free
15 May 2009	Matuzalém	Brazil	(Spain) Zaragoza	Lazio	€5.31M
18 May 2009^{1}	Fabio Cannavaro	Italy	(Spain) Real Madrid	Juventus	Free
18 May 2009	Michael Perrier	Switzerland	(Switzerland) Lugano	Genoa	€650,000
22 May 2009	Roman Eremenko	Finland	Udinese	(Ukraine) Dynamo Kyiv	Undisclosed
26 May 2009^{1}	Diego	Brazil	Werder Bremen (Germany)	Juventus	€ 24.5M + bonus
28 May 2009^{1}	Yoann Gourcuff	France	Milan	(France) Bordeaux	€13.6M
29 May 2009^{1}	Pablo Barrientos	Argentina	(Russia) FC Moscow	Catania	Undisclosed
29 May 2009^{1}	Hernán Crespo	Argentina	Internazionale	Genoa	Free
29 May 2009^{1}	Dimitrios Eleftheropoulos	Greece	Siena	(Greece) PAS Giannina	Free
1 June 2009	Fabio Quagliarella	Italy	Udinese	Napoli	€18M
3 June 2009	Francesco Pambianchi	Italy	Parma	Pergocrema	Co-ownership, €500
4 June 2009	Mauro Zárate	Argentina	(Qatar) Al-Sadd	Lazio	€20.2M + agent fee and solidarity contribution
4 June 2009	Filippo Carobbio	Italy	AlbinoLeffe	Bari	Free
5 June 2009	Simone Tiribocchi	Italy	Lecce	Atalanta	Undisclosed
5 June 2009	Ilario Lamberti	Italy	Sapri	Bari	Free
6 June 2009	Andrea Campagnolo	Italy	Reggina	Catania	Undisclosed
8 June 2009	Kaká	Brazil	Milan	(Spain) Real Madrid	€67M
9 June 2009^{1}	Leandro Caruso	Argentina	(Argentina) Godoy Cruz	Udinese	Undisclosed
10 June 2009	Daniele Dalla Bona	Italy	Pro Patria	Cittadella	Undisclosed
12 June 2009	Stefano Sorrentino	Italy	(Greece) AEK Athens	Chievo	Undisclosed
12 June 2009	Ricardo Chará	Colombia	(Colombia) Quindío	Udinese	Undisclosed
12 June 2009	Bruno Cirillo	Italy	Reggina	(Greece) PAOK	Free
12 June 2009	Jaime Romero	Spain	(Spain) Albacete	Udinese	Undisclosed
15 June 2009	Blerim Džemaili	Switzerland	(England) Bolton	Torino	Undisclosed
17 June 2009	Błażej Augustyn	Poland	(Poland) Legia Warszawa	Catania	Undisclosed
17 June 2009	Matias Ezequiel Schelotto	Italy	Cesena	Atalanta	Co-ownership, €325,000
18 June 2009	Evangelos Nastos	Greece	Ascoli	(Greece) Atromitos	Undisclosed
18 June 2009^{1}	Albano Bizzarri	Argentina	Catania	Lazio	Free
19 June 2009	Thiago Silva	Brazil	(Brazil) Tombense	Milan	€10.5M
19 June 2009	Nicolae Dică	Romania	Catania	(Greece) Iraklis	Loan, Undisclosed
22 June 2009	Dušan Basta	Serbia	(Serbia) Red Star Belgrade (on loan at Lecce)	Udinese	Undisclosed
22 June 2009	Stefano Guberti	Italy	Bari	Roma	Free
22 June 2009	Ciro Capuano	Italy	Palermo	Catania	€1M
22 June 2009	Guilherme do Prado	Brazil	Pro Patria	Cesena	Undisclosed
23 June 2009	Luis Jiménez	Chile	Internazionale	(England) West Ham United	Loan, Undisclosed
23 June 2010	Simone Colombi	Italy	Atalanta	Pergocrema	Loan, Undisclosed
23 June 2009	Olof Mellberg	Sweden	Juventus	(Greece) Olympiacos	€2.5M
2009-06-23	Nenê	Brazil	(Portugal) Nacional da Madeira	Cagliari	Undisclosed
23 June 2009	Andrea Cocco	Italy	Cagliari	Alghero	Co-ownership, Undisclosed
23 June 2009	Andrea Peana	Italy	Cagliari	Alghero	Co-ownership, Undisclosed
23 June 2009	Stefano Botta	Italy	Genoa	Vicenza	€200,000
24 June 2009^{2}	Mariano Andújar	Argentina	(Argentina) Estudiantes	Catania	Undisclosed
24 June 2009	Pierre-Emerick Aubameyang	Gabon	Milan	(France) Lille	Loan, Free
24 June 2009	Marco Motta	Italy	Udinese	Roma	Co-ownership, €3.5M
24 June 2009	Federico Marchetti	Italy	AlbinoLeffe	Cagliari	Co-ownership, Undisclosed
24 June 2009	Giacomo Di Donato	Italy	Chievo	Vicenza	€1M (swap with Rigoni)
2009-06-24	Ondřej Mazuch	Czech Republic	Fiorentina	(Belgium) Anderlecht	Loan
25 June 2009	Ergun Berisha	Turkey	(Switzerland) Grasshopper	Udinese	Undisclosed
25 June 2009	Boško Janković	Serbia	Palermo	Genoa	Co-ownership, €3.5M
25 June 2009	Domenico Criscito	Italy	Juventus	Genoa	Co-ownership, €5.5M
25 June 2009	Valerio Anastasi	Italy	Chievo	Pergocrema	Loan, Undisclosed
25 June 2009	William Jidayi	Italy	Sassuolo	Padova	Co-ownership, Undisclosed
2009-06-25	Boadu Maxwell Acosty	Ghana	Reggiana	Fiorentina	Undisclosed
25 June 2009	Matthias Lepiller	France	Fiorentina	(Belgium) Eupen	Loan, Free
25 June 2009	Alex Costa	Brazil	Fiorentina	(Belgium) Eupen	Free
25 June 2009	Stefano Del Sante	Italy	Fiorentina	Varese	Co-ownership, €120,000
25 June 2009	Arturo Lupoli	Italy	Fiorentina	Ascoli	Co-ownership, €1,000
25 June 2009	Francesco Di Tacchio	Italy	Ascoli	Fiorentina	Co-ownership, €1M
25 June 2009	Vasco Regini	Italy	Cesena	Sampdoria	Co-ownership, €300,000
25 June 2009	Giuseppe Bellusci	Italy	Ascoli	Catania	Undisclosed
25 June 2009	Vito Falconieri	Italy	Catania	Ascoli	Co-ownership, €500
25 June 2009	Marcello Gazzola	Italy	Catania	Ascoli	Co-ownership, €500
25 June 2009	Milan Bortel	Slovakia	Manfredonia	Catania	Undisclosed
25 June 2009	Milan Bortel	Slovakia	Catania	SPAL	Co-ownership, Undisclosed
25 June 2009^{1}	Dimitrios Papadopoulos	Greece	Lecce	(Croatia) Dinamo Zagreb	Free
25 June 2009	Andrea D'Amico	Italy	Catania	Reggiana	Loan, Undisclosed
25 June 2009	Nikolas Kras	Italy	Reggina	Lucchese	Co-ownership, Undisclosed
25 June 2009	Giovanni Di Lorenzo	Italy	Lucchese (youth)	Reggina (youth)	Loan, Undisclosed
26 June 2009	Leonardo Migliónico	Uruguay	Sampdoria (& Piacenza)	Livorno	€600,000
2009-06-26	Alberto Filippini	Italy	Atalanta	Padova	Co-ownership, Undisclosed
26 June 2009	Saša Bjelanović	Croatia	Torino	Vicenza	€700,000 (part of Gorobsov)
26 June 2009	Nicolás Gorobsov	Argentina	Vicenza	Torino	Co-ownership, €800,000 (€100,000 + Bjelanović)
26 June 2009	Reginaldo	Brazil	Parma	Siena	Co-ownership, €2.5M (player swap)
26 June 2009	Francesco Parravicini	Italy	Parma	Siena	~€2.64M (player swap)
26 June 2009	Daniele Galloppa	Italy	Siena	Parma	Co-ownership, €5M (player swap)
26 June 2009	Manuel Coppola	Italy	Siena	Parma	€3.25M
26 June 2009	Matteo Arati	Italy	Reggiana	Fiorentina	Co-ownership, €400,000
26 June 2009	Dario D'Ambrosio	Italy	Triestina	Chievo	Co-ownership, €340,000; Along with Cottafava swap with Brighenti and Calliari
26 June 2009	Marcello Cottafava	Italy	Triestina	Chievo	Co-ownership, €410,000; Along with D'Ambrosio swap with Brighenti and Calliari
26 June 2009	Amedeo Calliari	Italy	Chievo	Triestina	Co-ownership, €325,000; Along with Brighenti swap with Cottafava and D'Ambrosio
26 June 2009	Nicolò Brighenti	Italy	Chievo	Triestina	Co-ownership, €425,000; Along with Calliari swap with Cottafava and D'Ambrosio
26 June 2009	Giorgio Frezzolini	Italy	Modena	Ascoli	Free
26 June 2009	Simone Basso	Italy	Crotone	Frosinone	Undisclosed
26 June 2009	Matteo Ciofani	Italy	Renato Curi Angolana	Ascoli	Undisclosed
26 June 2009	Paulo Barreto	Brazil	Udinese	Bari	Loan, €400,000
27 June 2009	Antonio Langella	Italy	Udinese	Bari	Co-ownership, €1,000
28 June 2009	Aniello Panariello	Italy	Empoli	Pergocrema	Co-ownership, Undisclosed
29 June 2009	Salvatore Aurelio	Italy	Genoa	Frosinone	Co-ownership, €0.8M (part of Bocchetti )
29 June 2009	Cristian Raimondi	Italy	Vicenza	Livorno	Undisclosed
29 June 2009	Giacomo Beretta	Italy	AlbinoLeffe	Milan	Co-ownership, €0.9M
29 June 2009	Nicola Rigoni	Italy	Vicenza	Palermo	Co-ownership, €0.99M
29 June 2009	Nicola Rigoni	Italy	Palermo	Vicenza	Loan
29 June 2009	Gianvito Misuraca	Italy	Palermo	Vicenza	Co-ownership, €240,000
29 June 2009	Diego Milito	Argentina	Genoa	Internazionale	€28M
29 June 2009	Riccardo Meggiorini	Italy	Internazionale	Genoa	€5M
29 June 2009	Robert Acquafresca	Italy	Internazionale	Genoa	€9.5M
29 June 2009	Houssine Kharja	Morocco	Siena	Genoa	€6.5M
29 June 2009	Sergio Floccari	Italy	Atalanta	Genoa	€9.1M
29 June 2009	Gianluca Pegolo	Italy	Genoa	Siena	€1M
29 June 2009	Federico Gerardi	Italy	Udinese	Ancona	Loan, Undisclosed
30 June 2009	Ivano Baldanzeddu	Italy	Empoli	Lucchese	Co-ownership, Undisclosed
30 June 2009	Gabriele Pacciardi	Italy	Crotone	Benevento	Undisclosed
30 June 2009	Gennaro Delvecchio	Italy	Sampdoria	Catania	Free
30 June 2009	Giovanni Abate	Italy	Portogruaro	Mantova	Co-ownership, Undisclosed
30 June 2009	Christian Altinier	Italy	Mantova	Portogruaro	Co-ownership, Undisclosed
30 June 2009	Fabián Orellana	Chile	(Chile) Audax Italiano	Udinese	Undisclosed
30 June 2009	Simone Rizzato	Italy	Ancona	Reggina	Undisclosed
30 June 2009	Kris Thackray	England	Reggina	Ancona	Loan
30 June 2009	Francesco Cosenza	Italy	Reggina	Ancona	Co-ownership, Undisclosed
30 June 2009	Nenad Tomović	Serbia	(Serbia) Red Star Belgrade	Genoa	€2.2M
1 July 2009	Angelo Bencivenga	Italy	(Switzerland) la Chaux-de-Fonds	Udinese (youth)	Undisclosed
1 July 2009	Thiago Motta	Italy	Genoa	Internazionale	€10.2M
1 July 2009	Francesco Bolzoni	Italy	Internazionale	Genoa	€3M
1 July 2009	Leonardo Bonucci	Italy	Internazionale	Genoa	€3M
1 July 2009	Ivan Fatić	Montenegro	Chievo	Genoa	Co-ownership, €200,000
1 July 2009	Robert Acquafresca	Italy	Genoa	Atalanta	Loan, Undisclosed
1 July 2009	Nicola Madonna	Italy	AlbinoLeffe	Atalanta	Co-ownership, €550,000 (player swap)
1 July 2009	Michael Cia	Italy	Atalanta	AlbinoLeffe	Co-ownership, €400,000 (player swap)
1 July 2009	Dario Bergamelli	Italy	Atalanta	AlbinoLeffe	Co-ownership, €150,000 (player swap)
1 July 2009	Gianmarco Zigoni	Italy	Treviso	Milan	€1.3M
1 July 2009	Dario Campagna	Italy	Juventus	Verona	Loan, Free
1 July 2009	Ivan Castiglia	Italy	Reggina	Cittadella	Co-ownership, Undisclosed
1 July 2009	Lorenzo Pasqualini	Italy	Ascoli	Brindisi	Co-ownership, Undisclosed
2 July 2009	Daniel Bradaschia	Italy	Udinese	Lumezzane	Loan
2 July 2009	Djamel Mesbah	Algeria	(Switzerland) Luzern	Lecce	Undisclosed
2 July 2009	Luigi Riccio	Italy	Piacenza	Sassuolo	Undisclosed
2 July 2009	Mariano Romano	Italy	Siena	Sassuolo	Loan
2009-07-02	Diego Falcinelli	Italy	Pontevecchio	Sassuolo	Undisclosed
2009-07-02	Andrea Briotti	Italy	Sassuolo	Viareggio	Undisclosed
2009-07-02	Michael Brini Ferri	Italy	Sassuolo	Viareggio	Co-ownership, Undisclosed
2 July 2009	Daniel Offredi	Italy	Milan	AlbinoLeffe	Co-ownership, €50,000
2 July 2009	Nicola Belmonte	Italy	Siena	Bari	Loan, Free (between co-owner)
2 July 2009	Juan Guillermo Cuadrado	Colombia	(Colombia) Independiente Medellín	Udinese	Undisclosed
2 July 2009	Stefano Scappini	Italy	Sampdoria	Ravenna	Co-ownership, €120,000
2009-07-02	Caetano Prósperi Calil	Brazil	Siena	Frosinone	Co-ownership, Undisclosed
2 July 2009	Lorenzo Del Prete	Italy	Siena	Frosinone	Loan, Undisclosed
2 July 2009	Riccardo Meggiorini	Italy	Genoa	Bari	Co-ownership, €2.75M
2 July 2009	Leonardo Bonucci	Italy	Genoa	Bari	Co-ownership, €1.75M
2 July 2009	Giuseppe Greco	Italy	Genoa	Bari	Loan, Free
2 July 2009	Matteo Paro	Italy	Genoa	Bari	Loan, Free
2 July 2009	Daniele Padelli	Italy	Sampdoria	Bari	Loan, Free
2009-07-02	Mauro Boerchio	Italy	Bari	Lecco	Loan
2009-07-02	Giacinto Allegrini	Italy	Bari	Gubbio	Loan
2 July 2009	Eugenio Lamanna	Italy	Genoa	Gubbio	Loan, Free
2 July 2009	Alexis Carra	France	(France) Lyon	Vicenza	Free
2009-07-02	José Rocchi	Mexico	(Mexico) Lobos BUAP	Vicenza	Undisclosed
2 July 2009	Jonas Portin	Finland	(Finland) Jaro	Ascoli	Undisclosed
2 July 2009	Vincenzo Melillo	Italy	Paganese	Ascoli	Co-ownership, Undisclosed
2 July 2009	Alessandro Romeo	Italy	Sampdoria	Ascoli	Co-ownership, €500
2 July 2009	Francesco Potenza	Italy	Pro Vasto	Ascoli	Undisclosed
2 July 2009	Davide Zomer	Italy	Ascoli	Südtirol	Free
3 July 2009	Alessio Manzoni	Italy	Atalanta	Parma	Co-ownership, €1.5M
2009-07-03	Bernardo Corradi	Italy	Reggina	Udinese	Free
2009-07-03	Igor Djuric	Switzerland	Udinese	(Belgium) Eupen	Loan
2009-07-03	Francesco Cozza	Italy	Reggina	Salernitana	Undisclosed
2009-07-03	Edgar Álvarez	Honduras	Roma	Bari	€0.6M
3 July 2009	Luca Cigarini	Italy	Atalanta	Napoli	€10.5M
3 July 2009	Niccolò Manfredini	Italy	Fiorentina	Reggiana	Co-ownership, €1,000
3 July 2009	Marco Augusto Romizi	Italy	Fiorentina	Reggiana	Co-ownership, €1,000
3 July 2009	Lorenzo Morelli	Italy	Fiorentina	Reggiana	Co-ownership, €1,000
3 July 2009	Giacomo Casoli	Italy	Fiorentina	Gubbio	Loan, Undisclosed
3 July 2009	Max Taddei	Italy	Fiorentina	Gubbio	Loan, Undisclosed
3 July 2009	Jan Hable	Czech Republic	Fiorentina	(Czech Republic) Baník Ostrava	Loan, Undisclosed
3 July 2009	Jonathan Biabiany	Italy	Internazionale	Parma	Loan, Free
3 July 2009	Hernán Paolo Dellafiore	Italy	Palermo	Parma	Loan, €250,000
2009-07-03	Riccardo Allegretti	Italy	Triestina	Bari	Undisclosed
3 July 2009	Denis Alibec	Romania	(Romania) Farul Constanţa	Internazionale	Undisclosed
3 July 2009	Andrea Zanchetta	Italy	Lecce	Cremonese	Undisclosed
4 July 2009	Zlatko Dedič	Slovenia	Frosinone	(Germany) Bochum	Undisclosed
4 July 2009	Cesare Natali	Italy	Torino	Fiorentina	€2.8M
4 July 2009	Tommaso Bellazzini	Italy	Pistoiese	Cittadella	Loan, Undisclosed
5 July 2009	Daniel Semenzato	Italy	Venezia	Frosinone	Free
6 July 2009	Denny Nazari	Italy	Ascoli	Mezzocorona	Co-ownership, Undisclosed
6 July 2009	Kerlon	Brazil	Chievo	Internazionale	Free
6 July 2009	Vincenzo Rennella	Italy	Genoa	(Switzerland) Grasshopper	Loan, €1.285M
6 July 2009	Simone Loria	Italy	Roma	Torino	Loan, Free
6 July 2009	Emiliano Massimo	Italy	Roma	Aversa Normanna	Co-ownership, peppercorn
6 July 2009	Fabio Ceccarelli	Italy	Treviso	Chievo	Free
6 July 2009	Fabio Ceccarelli	Italy	Chievo	Cosenza	Co-ownership, €1,000
6 July 2009	Marco Valtulina	Italy	Torino	SPAL	Co-ownership, Undisclosed
7 July 2009	Kingsley Umunegbu	Nigeria	Milan	Varese	Loan, Free
7 July 2009	Wilfred Osuji	Nigeria	Milan	Varese	Loan, Free
7 July 2009	Oguchi Onyewu	United States	(Belgium) Standard Liège	Milan	Free
7 July 2009	Matteo Ferrari	Italy	Genoa	(Turkey) Beşiktaş	€4.5M
7 July 2009	Marino Defendi	Italy	Atalanta	Lecce	Loan, Undisclosed
7 July 2009	Antonio Ghomsi	Cameroon	Avellino	Siena	Undisclosed
7 July 2009	Antonio Ghomsi	Cameroon	Siena	(Belgium) Mechelen	Loan, Undisclosed
7 July 2009	Roberto Guana	Italy	Palermo	Bologna	Loan, €400,000
7 July 2009	Sergio Volpi	Italy	Bologna	Reggina	Undisclosed
7 July 2009	Francesco Antonioli	Italy	Bologna	Cesena	Undisclosed
2009-07-07	Andy Selva	San Marino	Sassuolo	Verona	Undisclosed
2009-07-07	Filippo Pensalfini	Italy	Sassuolo	Verona	Undisclosed
2009-07-07	Leonardo Massoni	Italy	Sassuolo	Verona	Co-ownership, €50,000
7 July 2009	Filipe	Brazil	Roma	Siena	Free
7 July 2009	Levan Mchedlidze	Georgia	Empoli	Palermo	Loan, Free
7 July 2009	Salvatore Temperino	Italy	Palermo	Rimini	Loan, Free
7 July 2009	Eliseu	Portugal	(Spain) Málaga	Lazio	€1M
8 July 2009	Christian Anelli	Italy	Parma	Carpenedolo	Co-ownership, €500
8 July 2009	Mattia Bovi	Italy	Parma	Carpenedolo	Co-ownership, €500
8 July 2009	Pietro Lorenzini	Italy	Parma	Carpenedolo	Co-ownership, €500
8 July 2009	Michele Paolucci	Italy	Juventus	Siena	Co-ownership, €3.3M
8 July 2009	Nicolás Córdova	Chile	Grosseto	Parma	Free
2009-07-08	Luca Belingheri	Italy	Ascoli	Torino	Undisclosed
2009-07-08	Marco Moro	Italy	Torino	Ascoli	Undisclosed
2009-07-08	Marcus Diniz	Brazil	Milan	Livorno	Loan
2009-07-08	Michael Agazzi	Italy	Triestina	Cagliari	Co-ownership, Undisclosed
2009-07-08	Michael Agazzi	Italy	Cagliari	Triestina	Loan
2009-07-08	Daniele Magliocchetti	Italy	Cagliari	Triestina	Loan
2009-07-08	Mario Frick	Liechtenstein	Siena	(Switzerland) St. Gallen	Free
2009-07-08	Andrea Mengoni	Italy	Chievo	Pescara	Loan
2009-07-09	Giorgio Corona	Italy	Mantova	Taranto	Undisclosed
9 July 2009	Giuseppe Caccavallo	Italy	Lecce	Cosenza	Co-ownership, Undisclosed
9 July 2009	Ugo Gabrieli	Italy	Lecce	Cosenza	Loan
9 July 2009	Mattia Ferrato	Italy	Parma	Pro Vercelli	Co-ownership, Undisclosed
9 July 2009	Radek Petr	Czech Republic	Parma	(Belgium) Eupen	Loan
9 July 2009	Dario D'Ambrosio	Italy	Chievo	Triestina	Loan
2009-07-09	Marcello Cottafava	Italy	Chievo	Triestina	Loan
2009-07-09	Luigi Castaldo	Italy	Siena	Paganese	Loan
9 July 2009	Hugo Campagnaro	Argentina	Sampdoria	Napoli	€7M
9 July 2009	Daniele Mannini	Italy	Napoli	Sampdoria	Co-ownership, €3.5M
9 July 2009	Juan Zúñiga	Colombia	Siena	Napoli	€8.5M
9 July 2009	Marcos Miranda		Treviso (youth)	Fiorentina (youth)	€250,000
9 July 2009	Lineker Vaz Costa		Treviso	Siena	Undisclosed
9 July 2009	Jeferson Leonardo Trazzi	Brazil	Treviso	Lecce	Undisclosed
9 July 2009	Andrea Ranocchia	Italy	Genoa	Bari	Loan, €250,000
9 July 2009	Vladimir Koman	Hungary	Sampdoria	Bari	Loan, €150,000
9 July 2009	Matteo Piccinni	Italy	Udinese	AlbinoLeffe	Co-ownership, Undisclosed
9 July 2009	Stefano Layeni	Italy	Prato	AlbinoLeffe	Loan
9 July 2009	Paolo Branduani	Italy	Colognese	AlbinoLeffe	Free
9 July 2009	Matteo Ardemagni	Italy	Triestina	Cittadella	Loan
9 July 2009	Giuseppe Ingrassia	Italy	Palermo	Verona	Loan, Free
2009-07-09	Giacomo Tedesco	Italy	Catania	Bologna	Undisclosed
2009-07-09	Mauro Minelli	Italy	Catania	Sassuolo	Undisclosed
2009-07-09	Sakari Mattila	Finland	Udinese	Ascoli	Loan
2009-07-09	Antonio Marino	Italy	Udinese	Ascoli	Loan
2009-07-09	Salvatore Pinna	Italy	Salernitana	Pescara	Undisclosed
2009-07-09	Leonardo Pavoletti	Italy	Sassuolo	Pavia	Co-ownership, Undisclosed
9 July 2009	Albin Ekdal	Sweden	Juventus	Siena	Loan, Free
10 July 2009	Antonino Ragusa	Italy	Treviso	Genoa	Free
2009-07-10	Matteo Trini	Italy	Juventus	Lumezzane	Co-ownership, Undisclosed
2009-07-10	Pierangelo Tarantino	Italy	Bari	Mezzocorona	Loan
2009-07-10	Antonio Bocchetti	Italy	Padova	Juve Stabia	Co-ownership, Undisclosed
10 July 2009	Fabio Lebran	Italy	Parma	Rimini	Co-ownership, €75,000
10 July 2009	Thomas Som	Cameroon	Parma	Pro Patria	Co-ownership, €500
2009-07-10	Amedeo Calliari	Italy	Triestina	Lumezzane	Loan
2009-07-10	Luca Mazzoni	Italy	Livorno	Arezzo	Undisclosed
2009-07-10	Giuseppe Rizza	Italy	Livorno	Arezzo	Loan
2009-07-10	Riccardo Maniero	Italy	Juventus	Arezzo	Loan
2009-07-10	Sandro Porchia	Italy	Grosseto	Cosenza	Undisclosed
2009-07-10	Davide Caremi	Italy	AlbinoLeffe	Frosinone	Free
2009-07-10	Fabio Pisacane	Italy	Lumezzane	Ancona	Loan
2009-07-10	Luigi Sala	Italy	Udinese	AlbinoLeffe	Undisclosed
2009-07-10	Antonio Zito	Italy	Siena	Crotone	Loan
2009-07-10	Luciano Zauri	Italy	Lazio	Sampdoria	Loan
2009-07-10	Matteo Lanzoni	Italy	Sampdoria	Mantova	Loan
2009-07-10	Flavio Lazzari	Italy	Udinese	Padova	Loan
2009-07-10	Fabio Caserta	Italy	Lecce	Atalanta	Undisclosed
2009-07-10	Gianluca Galasso	Italy	Bari	Salernitana	Loan
2009-07-10	Giuseppe Statella	Italy	Bari	Salernitana	Loan
2009-07-10	Marco Esposito	Italy	Bari	Mantova	Undisclosed
10 July 2009	Paolo Castellazzi	Italy	Sampdoria	Foligno	Co-ownership, €500
10 July 2009	Mirko Pieri	Italy	Sampdoria	Livorno	€300,000
2009-07-10	Davide Marchini	Italy	Triestina	Livorno	Undisclosed
2009-07-10	Gianluca Sansone	Italy	Siena	Lanciano	Loan
2009-07-10	Douglas Packer	Brazil	Siena	Ravenna	Loan
2009-07-10	Michele Fini	Italy	Cagliari	Siena	Free
2009-07-10	Francesco Caputo	Italy	Bari	Salernitana	Loan
2009-07-10	Ciro Polito	Italy	Catania	Salernitana	Undisclosed
2009-07-10	Mariano Stendardo	Italy	Genoa	Salernitana	Loan
2009-07-10	Daniele Cilli	Italy	Bari	Igea Virtus	Loan
2009-07-10	Antonio Infimo	Italy	Bari	Igea Virtus	Loan
2009-07-10	Diego Albadoro	Italy	Bari	Brindisi	Loan
2009-07-10	Marco Piccinni	Italy	Bari	Brindisi	Loan
2009-07-10	Fabio Grieco	Italy	Bari	Carpenedolo	Loan
2009-07-10	Michal Miskiewicz	Poland	Milan	Chievo	Loan
10 July 2009	Alberto Gerbo	Italy	Internazionale	Ancona	Loan, Undisclosed
10 July 2009	Luca Siligardi	Italy	Internazionale	Triestina	Loan, Undisclosed
10 July 2009	Attila Filkor	Hungary	Internazionale	Sassuolo	Loan, Undisclosed
10 July 2009	Simone Fautario	Italy	Internazionale	Grosseto	Co-ownership, €500
10 July 2009	Emiliano Moretti	Italy	(Spain) Valencia	Genoa	€3.5M
10 July 2009	Marco Costantino	Italy	SPAL	Sampdoria	Loan, Free
10 July 2009	Antonio Candreva	Italy	Udinese	Livorno	Loan, Undisclosed
10 July 2009	Matteo Merini	Italy	Lazio	Chievo	Free
	Matteo Merini	Italy	Chievo	Sangiovannese	Co-ownership, €500
10 July 2009	Maurizio Ciaramitaro	Italy	Palermo	(Switzerland) Bellinzona	Loan, Free
10 July 2009	Christian Bucchi	Italy	Napoli	Cesena	Loan, €45,000
10 July 2009	Marco Parolo	Italy	Chievo	Cesena	Loan, Undisclosed
10 July 2009	Francesco Checcucci	Italy	Chievo	Lumezzane	Co-ownership, Undisclosed
10 July 2009	Daniele Pedrelli	Italy	Internazionale	Cesena	Loan, Undisclosed
10 July 2009	Luca Castiglia	Italy	Juventus	Cesena	Loan, Free
10 July 2009	Davide Sinigaglia	Italy	Novara	Cesena	€500,000
10 July 2009	Simone Motta	Italy	Cesena	Novara	€720,000
10 July 2009	Olivier N'Siabamfumu	France	(Greece) AEK Athens	Crotone	Free
10 July 2009	Elia Legati	Italy	Milan	Crotone	Co-ownership, €10,000
10 July 2009	Matteo Coresi	Italy	Foligno	Crotone	Loan, Undisclosed
10 July 2009	Luca Di Matteo	Italy	Palermo	Crotone	Loan, Free
10 July 2009	Ferdinando Vitofrancesco	Italy	Cremonese	Grosseto	Loan, Undisclosed
10 July 2009	Gianluca Toscano	Italy	Tor Tre Teste	Grosseto	Free
10 July 2009	Francesco Giorgetti	Italy	Lecce	Andria	Loan, Undisclosed
10 July 2009	Tommaso Squillace	Italy	Reggina	Ravenna	Loan, Undisclosed
10 July 2009	Antonio Rizzo	Italy	Reggina	Ravenna	Loan, Undisclosed
10 July 2009	Josias Basso Lisboa	Brazil	Reggina	Ravenna	Loan, Undisclosed
10 July 2009	Antonio Lamenza	Italy	Reggina	Legnano	Loan, Undisclosed
10 July 2009	Giuseppe Saraò	Italy	Reggina	Paganese	Co-ownership, Undisclosed
10 July 2009	Nicolás Corvetto	Chile	Udinese	Triestina	Undisclosed
10 July 2009	Franco Lepore	Italy	Varese	Lecce	Loan, Undisclosed
10 July 2009	Luca Tognozzi	Italy	Reggina	Pescara	Undisclosed
10 July 2009	Davide Luppi	Italy	Bologna (youth)	Sassuolo (youth)	Undisclosed
10 July 2009	Davide Luppi	Italy	Sassuolo (youth)	Manfredonia	Co-ownership, Undisclosed
10 July 2009	Daniele Piro	Italy	Tor Tre Teste	Chievo	Free
11 July 2009	Andrei Cordoş	Romania	(Romania) Universitatea Cluj	Frosinone	Undisclosed
11 July 2009	Thomas Albanese	Italy	Siena	South Tyrol	Loan, Undisclosed
11 July 2009	Javier Pastore	Argentina	Marcelo Simonian (third parties ownership)	Palermo	€4.7M
11 July 2009	Edgar Barreto	Paraguay	Reggina	Atalanta	Undisclosed
2009-07-11	Massimo Ganci	Italy	Salernitana	Pescara	Undisclosed
2009-07-12	Giorgio Parodi	Italy	Genoa	Lecco	Loan
12 July 2009	Daniele Simoncelli	Italy	Brescia	Barletta	Co-ownership, Undisclosed
12 July 2009	Martin Petráš	Slovakia	Triestina	Cesena	Undisclosed
13 July 2009	Giovanni Formiconi	Italy	Udinese	Lumezzane	Loan, Undisclosed
13 July 2009	Paolo Tornaghi	Italy	Internazionale	Rimini	Co-ownership, €500
13 July 2009	Emiliano Viviano	Italy	Brescia	Bologna	€3.5M (co-own with Inter)
13 July 2009	Andrea Raggi	Italy	Palermo	Bologna	Loan, €140,000
13 July 2009	Francesco Della Rocca	Italy	Bologna	Brescia	Loan, Undisclosed
13 July 2009	Adrian Bica Badan	Romania	Catania	Cassino	Co-ownership, Undisclosed
13 July 2009	Rosario Bucolo	Italy	Catania	Celano Olimpia	Co-ownership, Undisclosed
13 July 2009	Federico Conti	Italy	Catania	Cassino	Co-ownership, Undisclosed
13 July 2009	Giuseppe Di Pasquale	Italy	Catania	Manfredonia	Co-ownership, Undisclosed
13 July 2009	Antonino Profeta	Italy	Catania	Potenza	Co-ownership, Undisclosed
13 July 2009	Davide Lanzafame	Italy	Palermo	Parma	Loan, Free
13 July 2009	Selim Ben Djemia	Tunisia	Genoa	Padova	Loan, Undisclosed
13 July 2009	Francesco Renzetti	Italy	Genoa	Padova	Co-ownership, €500,000
13 July 2009	Daniele Gasparetto	Italy	Atalanta	Padova	Loan, Undisclosed
13 July 2009	Gianluigi Bianco	Italy	Sampdoria	Sassuolo	Loan, Free
13 July 2009	Andrea Gessa	Italy	Grosseto	Pescara	Undisclosed
13 July 2009	Chedric Seedorf	Netherlands	Milan	Monza	Loan, Free
13 July 2009	Luca Fiuzzi	Italy	Empoli	Monza	Co-ownership, Undisclosed
13 July 2009	Alessandro Tuia	Italy	Lazio	Monza	Loan
13 July 2009	Andrea Caroppo	Italy	Brescia	Olbia	Loan, Undisclosed
14 July 2009	Filippo Noventa	Italy	Milan	Monza	Free
14 July 2009	Matías Claudio Cuffa	Argentina	Portogruaro	Padova	Co-ownership, Undisclosed
14 July 2009	Davide Bianchi	Italy	Padova	Portogruaro	Co-ownership, Undisclosed
14 July 2009	Andrea Burato	Italy	Chievo	Verona	Loan, Undisclosed
14 July 2009	Aiman Napoli	Italy	Internazionale	Modena	Loan, Undisclosed
14 July 2009	Enrico Alfonso	Italy	Internazionale (co-owned with Chievo)	Modena	Loan, Undisclosed
14 July 2009	Cristian Daminuţă	Romania	Internazionale	Modena	Loan, Undisclosed
14 July 2009	Rafael Romo	Venezuela	(Venezuela) Llaneros	Udinese (youth)	Undisclosed
14 July 2009	Luca Ariatti	Italy	Lecce	Chievo	Undisclsoed
14 July 2009	Emiliano Bonazzoli	Italy	Sampdoria	Reggina	€850,000
14 July 2009	Denis Godeas	Italy	Mantova	Triestina	Undisclosed
14 July 2009	Rocco Sabato	Italy	Empoli	Triestina	Undisclosed
15 July 2009	Andrea Raimondi	Italy	Padova	Sangiovannese	Loan, Undisclosed
15 July 2009	Gaetano Vastola	Italy	Gallipoli	Lanciano	Free
15 July 2009	Francesco Volpe	Italy	Livorno (co-owned with Juventus)	Triestina	Loan, Undisclosed
15 July 2009	Raffaele Bianco	Italy	Juventus	Modena	Loan, Undisclosed
15 July 2009	Cristiano Lucarelli	Italy	Parma	Livorno	Loan, Free
15 July 2009	Felipe Melo	Brazil	Fiorentina	Juventus	€25M
15 July 2009	Marco Marchionni	Italy	Juventus	Fiorentina	€4.5M
15 July 2009	Cristian Pasquato	Italy	Juventus	Empoli	Loan, Free
15 July 2009	Davide Baiocco	Italy	Catania	Brescia	Free
15 July 2009	Mehmet Hetemaj	Finland	(Greece) Panionios	AlbinoLeffe	Loan, Undisclosed
15 July 2009	Michael Girasole	Italy	Atalanta	AlbinoLeffe	Co-ownership, €50,000
16 July 2009	Matias Schelotto	Italy	Atalanta	Cesena	Loan, Undisclosed (between co-owner)
16 July 2009	Ildefons Lima	Andorra	Triestina	(Switzerland) Bellinzona	Undisclosed
16 July 2009	Simone Aresti	Italy	Cagliari	Alghero	Co-ownership, Undisclosed
16 July 2009	Lino Marzoratti	Italy	Empoli	Cagliari	Co-ownership, Undisclosed
16 July 2009	Marco Mancosu	Italy	Cagliari	Empoli	Loan, Undisclosed
16 July 2009	Nicolás Bertolo	Argentina	(Argentina) Banfield	Palermo	€3.682M
16 July 2009	Raffaele De Martino	Italy	Avellino	Crotone	Free
16 July 2009	Valerio Foglio	Italy	Vicenza	AlbinoLeffe	Co-ownership, Undisclosed
16 July 2009	Davide Gavazzi	Italy	Renate (amateur)	Vicenza	Free
16 July 2009	Emmanuel Ledesma	Argentina	Genoa	Novara	Loan, Undisclosed
16 July 2009	Trevor Trevisan	Italy	Pisa	Padova	Free
16 July 2009	Mirko Eramo	Italy	Sampdoria	Monza	Loan, Undisclosed
16 July 2009	Dennis Esposito	Italy	Internazionale	Monza	Loan, Undisclosed
16 July 2009	Salvatore Burrai	Italy	Cagliari	Cremonese	Loan, Undisclosed
16 July 2009	Andrea Torta	Italy	Juventus	Foggia	Co-ownership, Undisclosed
16 July 2009	Davide Facchin	Italy	Milan	Pavia	Loan, Free
2009-07-17	Michele Tarallo	Italy	Genoa	Pergocrema	Free
2009-07-17	Massimiliano Pesenti	Italy	AlbinoLeffe	Lumezzane	Loan
17 July 2009	Carmine Cucciniello	Italy	Sampdoria	Paganese	Loan
17 July 2009	Gabriel Ferrari	United States	Sampdoria	Foggia	Loan, Undisclosed
17 July 2009	Federico Agliardi	Italy	Palermo	Padova	Free
17 July 2009	Raffaele Ioime	Italy	Catania	SPAL	Co-ownership, Undisclosed
2009-07-17	Armando Visconti	Italy	Avellino	Bari	Undisclosed
2009-07-17	Francesco Stella	Italy	Bari	Manfredonia	Loan
17 July 2009	Mahamet Diagouraga	Mali	Chievo	Modena	Co-ownership, €230,000
2009-07-17	Giampiero Pinzi	Italy	Udinese	Chievo	Loan
2009-07-17	Alain Nef	Switzerland	Udinese	Triestina	Loan
2009-07-17	Maxwell	Brazil	Internazionale	(Spain) Barcelona	€4.5M + bonus
2009-07-17	Matteo Darmian	Italy	Milan	Padova	Loan
17 July 2009	Dario Venitucci	Italy	Juventus	Arezzo	Loan, Free
2009-07-17	Domenico Di Cecco	Italy	Chievo	Lanciano	Co-ownership, Undisclosed
2009-07-17	Leonardo Pettinari	Italy	Reggina	Cittadella	Co-ownership, Undisclosed
2009-07-18	Riccardo Durandi	Italy	Ascoli (youth)	Triestina (youth)	Undisclosed
18 July 2009	César	Brazil	Chievo	Padova	Free
2009-07-18	Luca Brunetti	Italy	Isola Liri	Salernitana	Free
18 July 2009	Paolo Carbonaro	Italy	Palermo	Giulianova	Loan, Free
18 July 2009	Gianluca Palmiteri	Italy	Palermo	Celano	Loan, Free
18 July 2009	Rosario Costantino	Italy	Palermo	Monopoli	Loan, Free
18 July 2009	Alberto Cossentino	Italy	Palermo	Novara	Loan, €105,250
18 July 2009	Giuseppe Polito	Italy	Palermo	South Tyrol	Co-ownership, €500
19 July 2009	Marco Rossi	Italy	Parma	Sampdoria	Loan, Free
19 July 2009	Antonio Mirante	Italy	Sampdoria	Parma	Loan, Free
19 July 2009	Biagio Pagano	Italy	Rimini	Reggina	Co-ownership, Undisclosed
19 July 2009	Enar Jääger	Estonia	(Norway) Aalesunds	Ascoli	Free
20 July 2009	Riccardo Bolzan	Italy	Chievo	Taranto	Loan, Undisclosed
20 July 2009	Danilo Soddimo	Italy	Sampdoria	Salernitana	Loan, Undisclosed
20 July 2009	Lúcio	Brazil	(Germany) Bayern Munich	Internazionale	€7.85M
20 July 2009	Davide Carrus	Italy	Bologna	Mantova	Undisclosed
20 July 2009	Pablo Fontanello	Argentina	(Chile) Unión San Felipe	Parma	Undisclosed
20 July 2009	José Castillo	Italy; Argentina	Lecce	Fiorentina	€1M
20 July 2009	Vincenzo Italiano	Italy	Chievo	Padova	Undisclosed
20 July 2009	Jean Mbida	Cameroon	Internazionale (co-owned with Vicenza)	Como	Loan, Undisclosed
20 July 2009	Daniele Marino	Italy	Internazionale	Melfi	Co-ownership, €500
2009-07-20	Michele Ischia	Italy	Frosinone	Rimini	Undisclosed
2009-07-20	Migjen Basha	Switzerland	Rimini	Frosinone	Co-ownership, Undisclosed
2009–07–20	Júnior Costa	Brazil	(Switzerland) Bellinzona	Ancona	Loan
2009-07-20	Andrea Milani	Italy	Triestina	Ancona	Undisclosed
2009-07-20	Giuseppe Scurto	Italy	Treviso	Triestina	Free
2009-07-20	Fabio Romeo	Italy	Lecce	Barletta	Loan
21 July 2009	Simone Malatesta	Italy	Parma	Mantova	Co-ownership, €100,000
21 July 2009	Giovanni Taormina	Italy	Sampdoria	Viareggio	Co-ownership, €500
2009-07-21	Nicola Strambelli	Italy	Bari	Taranto	LOan
2009-07-21	Romeo Papini	Italy	Ternana	Grosseto	Undisclosed
2009-07-21	Pablo Álvarez	Uruguay	Reggina	(Poland) Wisła Kraków	Loan
2009-07-21	Filippo Antonelli	Italy	Triestina	Bari	Free
2009-07-21	Ronald Huth	Paraguay	(Paraguay) Tacuary	Vicenza	Loan
2009-07-21	Cirilo Mora	Paraguay	(Paraguay) Tacuary	Vicenza	Loan
21 July 2009	Federico Erba	Italy	Roma	Cesena	Co-ownership, peppercorn
21 July 2009	Mariano Rudi	Italy	Genoa (youth)	Pro Patria	Free
22 July 2009	Luca Scapuzzi	Italy	Milan (youth)	Portogruaro	Free
22 July 2009	Ettore Marchi	Italy	Triestina	Portogruaro	Loan, Undisclosed
2009-07-22	Giorgio Lucenti	Italy	Frosinone	Potenza	Free
22 July 2009	Samon Reider Rodríguez	Cuba	Juventus	Alessandria	Loan, Free
22 July 2009	Loris Damonte	Italy	Genoa	Alessandria	Loan, Undisclosed
22 July 2009	Fernando Tissone	Argentina	Udinese	Sampdoria	Co-ownership, €3M
22 July 2009	Jonathan Rossini	Switzerland	Sampdoria	Udinese	Co-ownership, €500,000
22 July 2009	Jonathan Rossini	Switzerland	Udinese	Sassuolo	Loan, Undisclosed
22 July 2009	Giacomo Bindi	Italy	Internazionale	Foggia	Loan, Undisclosed
2009-07-22	Emanuele D'Anna	Italy	Chievo	Benevento	Undisclosed
2009-07-23	Marco Zentil	Italy	Sambenedettese	Vicenza	Free
2009-07-23	Marco Zentil	Italy	Vicenza	Rodengo Saiano	Loan
2009-07-23	Nicolò Antonelli	Italy	Genoa	Savona	Loan
2009-07-23	Nicola Dal Bosco	Italy	Vicenza	Rodengo Saiano	Loan
23 July 2009	Vincenzo Pepe	Italy	Avellino	Salernitana	Free
23 July 2009	Davide Carcuro	Italy	Treviso	Salernitana	Free
23 July 2009	Samir Ujkani	Albania	Palermo	Novara	Loan, Free
23 July 2009	Giacomo Brichetto	Italy	Novara	Palermo	Loan, Free
2009-07-23	Edoardo Braiati	Italy	Pisa	Vicenza	Free
2009-07-23	Iván Amaya	Spain	(Spain) Elche	Udinese	Undisclosed
2009-07-23	Iván Amaya	Spain	Udinese	(Spain) Granada	Loan
2009-07-23	Javi Casares	Spain	(Spain) San Fernando	Udinese	Undisclosed
2009-07-23	Javi Casares	Spain	Udinese	(Spain) Granada	?
2009-07-23	Tariq Spezie	Spain	(Spain) Puertollano	Udinese	Undisclosed
2009-07-23	Tariq Spezie	Spain	Udinese	(Spain) Granada	?
2009-07-23	Dani Benítez	Spain	(Spain) Mallorca	Udinese	Undisclosed
2009-07-23	Dani Benítez	Spain	Udinese	(Spain) Granada	Loan
2009-07-23	Diego Mainz	Spain	(Spain) Albacete	Udinese	Undisclosed
2009-07-23	Diego Mainz	Spain	Udinese	(Spain) Granada	?
2009-07-23	Giorgio Gianola	Italy	Milan	Varese	Loan
23 July 2009	Giuseppe Figliomeni	Italy	Crotone	Arezzo	Free
23 July 2009	Nicholas Costantini	Italy	Genoa	Ternana	Loan, Undisclosed
2009-07-24	Allan Nyom	France	(France) Arles-Avignon	Udinese	Undisclosed
2009-07-24	Morgan De Sanctis	Italy	(Spain) Sevilla	Napoli	€1.5M
2009-07-24	Rodrigo Palacio	Argentina	(Argentina) Boca Juniors	Genoa	€2.81M
2009-07-24	Abel Aguilar	Colombia	Udinese	(Spain) Zaragoza	Loan
24 July 2009	Jonni Cabrera	Paraguay	(Paraguay) Cerro Porteño	Udinese (youth)	Undisclosed
24 July 2009	Nicolás Spolli	Argentina	(Argentina) Newell's Old Boys	Catania	Undisclosed
24 July 2009	Giacomo Tulli	Italy	Sambenedettese	Vicenza	Free
2009-07-24	Gennaro Esposito	Italy	Siena	Verona	Co-ownership, Undisclosed
2009-07-24	Matteo Gentili	Italy	Atalanta	Varese	Loan
2009-07-24	Giorgio Gianola	Italy	Milan	Varese	Loan
2009-07-24	Daniele Quadrini	Italy	Treviso	Sassuolo	Free
24 July 2009	Luca Tedeschi	Italy	Treviso	Parma	Free
24 July 2009	Luca Tedeschi	Italy	Parma	Ternana	Co-ownership, €500
2009-07-25	Juan Pablo Carrizo	Argentina	Lazio	(Spain) Zaragoza	Loan
2009-07-26	Filippo Cristante	Italy	Mantova	Ancona	Undisclosed
2009-07-26	Luciano Zavagno	Argentina	Pisa	Ancona	Free
2009-07-26	Emerson	Brazil	Milan	(Brazil) Santos	Free
2009-07-27	Simone Masini	Italy	Ascoli	Lanciano	Loan
27 July 2009	Francesco Battaglia	Italy	(Belgium) Eupen	Cittadella	Undisclosed
2009-07-27	Zlatan Ibrahimović	Sweden	Internazionale	(Spain) Barcelona	€69.5M
2009-07-27	Samuel Eto'o	Cameroon	(Spain) Barcelona	Internazionale	€20M
2009-07-27	Allan Nyom	France	Udinese	(Spain) Granada	Loan
2009-07-27	Paulinho	Brazil	Livorno	Sorrento	Loan
2009-07-27	Marco D'Alessandro	Italy	Roma	Grosseto	Loan
2009-07-27	José Montiel	Paraguay	Reggina	(Argentina) Tigre	Loan
2009-07-27	Ahmed Barusso	Ghana	Roma	Brescia	Loan
2009-07-28	Felipe Sanchón	Spain	(Greece) Aris	Udinese	Undisclosed
2009-07-28	Felipe Sanchón	Spain	Udinese	(Spain) Granada	Loan
2009-07-28	Óscar Pérez	Spain	(Spain) Tenerife	Udinese	Undisclosed
28 July 2009	Óscar Pérez	Spain	Udinese	(Spain) Granada	?
28 July 2009	Fernando Forestieri	Italy	Genoa	Udinese	Co-ownership, €1.5M
28 July 2009	Fernando Forestieri	Italy	Udinese	(Spain) Málaga	Loan
28 July 2009	Andrea Esposito	Italy	Lecce	Genoa	Co-ownership, €2.8M
28 July 2009	Matteo Guardalben	Italy	Treviso	Sampdoria	Free
28 July 2009	Erwin Hoffer	Austria	(Austria) Rapid Wien	Napoli	€5M
28 July 2009	Riccardo Brosco	Italy	Roma	Triestina	Loan, Free
28 July 2009	David Enrique Mateo	Brazil	Fiorentina	Lecco	Loan, Undisclosed
28 July 2009	Antonino Bonvissuto	Italy	Bari	Crotone	Loan, Free
28 July 2009	Mario Cassano	Italy	Piacenza	Reggina	Loan, Undisclosed
28 July 2009	Moreno Zebi	Italy	Cesena	Monza	Undisclosed
28 July 2009	Alberto Galuppo	Italy	Parma	Cremonese	Loan Free
28 July 2009	Christian Puggioni	Italy	Reggina	Piacenza	Loan
29 July 2009	Valeri Bojinov	Bulgaria	(England) Manchester City	Parma	Loan, Free
29 July 2009	David Rozehnal	Czech Republic	Lazio	(Germany) Hamburg	€2.52M
29 July 2009	Hemza Mihoubi	France	Lecce	(Switzerland) Bellinzona	Undisclosed
29 July 2009	Alain Baclet	France	Arezzo	Lecce	Co-ownership, Undisclosed
30 July 2009	Christian Panucci	Italy	Roma	Parma	Free
30 July 2009	Alex Benvenga	Italy	Lecce	Varese	Co-ownership, Undisclosed
30 July 2009	Marco Puntoriere	Italy	Internazionale (youth)	Mantova (youth)	Free
30 July 2009	Benedetto Lorusso	Italy	Bari (youth)	Noicattaro	Loan
31 July 2009	Alberto Artuso	Italy	Chievo	Südtirol	Co-ownership, Undisclosed
31 July 2009	Domenico Di Cecco	Italy	Chievo	Lanciano	Co-ownership, Undisclosed
31 July 2009	Massimo Bonanni	Italy	Sampdoria	Pescara	Free
31 July 2009	Alberto Zapater	Spain	(Spain) Zaragoza	Genoa	€2.906M
31 July 2009	Steve Pinau	France	Genoa	(Switzerland) Lugano	Loan, Undisclosed
31 July 2009	Julio Ricardo Cruz	Argentina	Internazionale	Lazio	€2.15M (commission)
31 July 2009	Christian Stuani	Uruguay	Reggina	(Spain) Albacete	Loan
2009-07-31	Adriano Mezavilla	Brazil	Catania	Taranto	Co-ownership, Undisclosed
2009-07-31	Marco Di Fatta	Italy	Catania	Taranto	Co-ownership, Undisclosed
2009-07-31	Raffaele Imparato	Brazil	Catania	Taranto	Loan
2009-07-31	Nicola Ferrari	Italy	Sassuolo	Viareggio	Co-ownership, Undisclosed
2009-07-31	Alessio Cristiani	Italy	Viareggio	Sassuolo	Co-ownership, Undisclosed
2009-07-31	Domenico Marchetti	Italy	Fiorentina	Barletta	Loan
2009-07-31	Lorenzo Farinelli	Italy	Triestina	Sangiustese	?

^{1}Player officially joined his new club on July 1, 2009.
^{2}Player officially joined his new club after Copa Libertadores
