= Andrea Milani =

Andrea Milani may refer to:

- Andrea Milani (footballer, born 1919), Italian footballer with Inter Milan and Palermo
- Andrea Milani (footballer, born 1980), Italian footballer with Ancona
- Andrea Milani (mathematician), Italian mathematician
