= 2009–10 Udinese Calcio season =

Udinese
2009–10 season
- President: Franco Soldati
- Manager: Pasquale Marino (until 22 December 2009); Gianni De Biasi (from 22 December 2009 to 21 February 2010); Pasquale Marino (from 21 February 2010)
- Stadium: Stadio Friuli
- Serie A: 15th
- Coppa Italia: Semi-finals
- Top goalscorer: League: Antonio Di Natale (29); All: Antonio Di Natale (29)
- Highest home attendance: 25,000 vs Milan (23 September 2009, Serie A)
- Lowest home attendance: 13,000 vs Catania (13 September 2009, Serie A) vs Sampdoria (24 January 2010)
- Average home league attendance: 17,356
Home colours	Away colours	Third colours

The 2009–10 Udinese Calcio season was the club's 15th consecutive and 30th overall season in Serie A. The team competed in Serie A, finishing 15th, and in the Coppa Italia, reaching the semi-finals. The highlight of Udinese's season was captain Antonio Di Natale's excellent campaign, as he finished top scorer in Serie A, or capocannoniere, with 29 goals.

== Players ==
=== Squad information ===
As of 28 January 2010 Note: Flags indicate national team as defined under FIFA eligibility rules; some limited exceptions apply. Players may hold more than one non-FIFA nationality.

No.	Pos.	Nation	Player
1	GK	VEN	Rafael Romo
2	DF	COL	Cristián Zapata (vice captain)
3	DF	CHI	Mauricio Isla
4	DF	COL	Juan Cuadrado
5	MF	NGA	Christian Obodo
6	GK	ITA	Emanuele Belardi
7	FW	ITA	Simone Pepe
8	MF	SRB	Dušan Basta
9	FW	ITA	Bernardo Corradi
10	FW	ITA	Antonio Di Natale (captain)
11	FW	CHI	Alexis Sánchez
13	DF	ITA	Andrea Coda
14	MF	ITA	Paolo Sammarco
15	DF	COL	Ricardo Chará
16	MF	RUS	Viktor Budjanskij
17	FW	BRA	Alemão

No.	Pos.	Nation	Player
19	MF	GHA	Emmanuel Agyemang-Badu
20	MF	GHA	Kwadwo Asamoah
21	MF	ITA	Gaetano D'Agostino
22	GK	SVN	Samir Handanović
23	MF	ESP	Jaime Romero
24	DF	SRB	Aleksandar Luković
26	DF	ITA	Giovanni Pasquale
27	FW	ESP	Alexandre Geijo
28	MF	DEN	Niki Zimling
32	DF	ITA	Damiano Ferronetti
35	DF	PAR	Jonni Cabrera
80	DF	ITA	Maurizio Domizzi
83	FW	ITA	Antonio Floro Flores
84	MF	ITA	Francesco Lodi
86	MF	BRA	Guilherme Siqueira
88	MF	SUI	Gökhan Inler

== Transfers ==
For all transfers and loans pertaining to Udinese for the current season, please see: 2009 summer transfers and 2009–10 winter transfers .

=== Summer 2009 ===
==== In ====
Date	Name	Nationality	Moving from	Fee
2009-06-22	Dušan Basta	Serbia	(Serbia) Red Star Belgrade	Undisclosed
2009-07-02	Juan Cuadrado	Colombia	(Colombia) Independiente Medellín	Undisclosed
2009-07-03	Bernardo Corradi	Italy	Reggina	Free
2009-07-14	Rafael Romo	Venezuela	(Venezuela) Llaneros	Undisclosed
2009-08-25	Paolo Sammarco	Italy	Sampdoria	Loan
2009-08-28	Francesco Lodi	Italy	Empoli	Loan

==== Out ====
Date	Name	Nationality	Moving from	Fee
2009-06-27	Barreto	Brazil	Bari	Loan
2009-07-17	Giampiero Pinzi	Italy	Chievo	Loan
2009-05-22^{1}	Roman Eremenko	Finland	(Ukraine) Dynamo Kyiv	Undisclosed
2009-07-10	Antonio Candreva	Italy	Livorno	Loan
2009-06-01	Fabio Quagliarella	Italy	Napoli	Undisclosed
2009-06-24	Marco Motta	Italy	Roma	€7,000,000
2009-07-22	Fernando Tissone	Argentina	Sampdoria	Co-ownership, Undisclosed

=== Winter 2009–10 ===
==== In ====
Date	Name	Nationality	Moving from	Fee
2010-01-28	Emmanuel Agyemang-Badu	Ghana	(Ghana) Berlin Berekum	Undisclosed
2010-02-02	Alexandre Geijo	Switzerland/Spain	(Spain) Racing Santander	Undisclosed

==== Out ====
Date	Name	Nationality	Moving from	Fee
2010-01-02	Felipe	Brazil	Fiorentina	Loan
2010-01-20	Antonio Candreva	Italy	Juventus	Loan

== Competitions ==
=== Serie A ===
==== League table ====
Pos	Team	Pld	W	D	L	GF	GA	GD	Pts
13	Catania	38	10	15	13	44	45	−1	45
14	Chievo	38	12	8	18	37	42	−5	44 (Note: Chievo finished ahead of Udinese and Cagliari on head-to-head points: Chievo: 8 pts, Udinese: 6 pts, Cagliari: 1 pts.)
15	Udinese	38	11	11	16	54	59	−5	44
16	Cagliari	38	11	11	16	56	58	−2	44
17	Bologna	38	10	12	16	42	55	−13	42

Source: Lega Calcio and Yahoo! Sport
Rules for classification: 1) points; 2) head-to-head points; 3) head-to-head goal difference; 4) head-to-head goals scored; 5) goal difference; 6) number of goals scored.

==== Results summary ====
Overall								Home						Away					
Pld	W	D	L	GF	GA	GD	Pts	W	D	L	GF	GA	GD	W	D	L	GF	GA	GD
38	11	11	16	54	59	−5	44	10	5	4	38	25	+13	1	6	12	16	34	−18

Last updated: 15 May 2010.
Source: Competitive matches

==== Results by round ====
Round	1	2	3	4	5	6	7	8	9	10	11	12	13	14	15	16	17	18	19	20	21	22	23	24	25	26	27	28	29	30	31	32	33	34	35	36	37	38
Ground	H	A	H	A	H	H	A	H	A	H	A	H	A	H	A	A	H	A	H	A	H	A	H	A	A	H	A	H	A	H	A	H	A	H	H	A	H	A
Result	D	L	W	D	W	W	L	L	L	W	D	L	L	W	L	L	W	L	D	D	L	D	W	L	L	L	D	W	L	D	L	W	W	D	W	D	D	L
Position	8	14	7	12	7	5	7	12	13	11	13	14	14	12	14	14	14	14	14	14	14	14	14	15	15	16	16	16	16	17	17	15	15	15	14	14	12	15

Updated to match(es) played on 15 May 2010. Source: Competitive matches
A = Away; H = Home; W = Win; D = Draw; L = Loss

==== Matches ====
23 August 2009 1	Udinese	2–2	Parma	Udine
20:45 CEST (UTC+02:00)	Pepe (yellow card) 32'; Zimling (yellow card) 38'; Di Natale 45+3' (pen.), 90'; Felipe (yellow card) 48'; Sánchez (yellow card) 85'	Report	Paloschi 43'; Mariga (yellow card) 44'; Panucci (yellow card) 45+1'; Lucarelli 49', (yellow card) 90+3'	Stadium: Stadio Friuli; Attendance: 15,383; Referee: Paolo Valeri

30 August 2009 2	Sampdoria	3–1	Udinese	Genoa
20:45 CEST (UTC+02:00)	Pazzini 11'; Mannini 45+1'; Stankevičius (yellow card) 51'; Cassano 83'	Report	Luković (yellow card) 26'; Pepe (yellow card) 45'; Di Natale 56', (yellow card) 60'; Floro Flores (yellow card) 85'	Stadium: Stadio Luigi Ferraris; Attendance: 22,995; Referee: Matteo Trefoloni

13 September 2009 3	Udinese	4–2	Catania	Udine
15:00 CEST (UTC+02:00)	Floro Flores 29'; Felipe (yellow card) 34'; Di Natale 55', 70' (pen.), 79'; Isla (yellow card) 81'	Report	Morimoto 11'; Delvecchio (yellow card) 25'; Mascara 34' (pen.); Spolli (yellow card) 40'; Pesce (yellow card) 64'; Potenza (yellow card) 68'	Stadium: Stadio Friuli; Attendance: 15,078; Referee: Mauro Bergonzi

19 September 2009 4	Napoli	0–0	Udinese	Naples
18:00 CEST (UTC+02:00)		Report	Floro Flores (yellow card) 57'; Handanović (yellow card) 86'	Stadium: Stadio San Paolo; Attendance: 30,946; Referee: Massimiliano Saccani

23 September 2009 5	Udinese	1–0	Milan	Udine
20:45 CEST (UTC+02:00)	Di Natale 22', (yellow card) 31'; Coda (yellow card) 60'	Report	Nesta (yellow card) 51'; Inzaghi (yellow card) 59'; Flamini (yellow card) 83' (yellow-red card) 84'; Seedorf (yellow card) 88'	Stadium: Stadio Friuli; Attendance: 21,000; Referee: Luca Banti

27 September 2009 6	Udinese	2–0	Genoa	Udine
15:00 CEST (UTC+02:00)	Pepe (yellow card) 34', (goal) 88'; Domizzi (yellow card) 47'; Di Natale 82'; Floro Flores (yellow card) 86'	Report	Mesto (yellow card) 61'	Stadium: Stadio Friuli; Attendance: 15,762; Referee: Matteo Trefoloni

3 October 2009 7	Internazionale	2–1	Udinese	Milan
20:45 CEST (UTC+02:00)	Sneijder (yellow card) 19', (goal) 90+3'; Stanković 22'; Chivu (yellow card) 55'	Report	Di Natale 27'; Domizzi (yellow card) 45+1'; Floro Flores (yellow card) 62'; Luković (yellow card) 68'; Corradi (yellow card) 78'; Coda (yellow card) 84'	Stadium: San Siro; Attendance: 50,000; Referee: Mauro Bergonzi

18 October 2009 8	Udinese	1–3	Atalanta	Udine
15:00 CEST (UTC+02:00)	Lodi 8'; Basta (yellow card) 12'; Luković (yellow card) 40'	Report	Tiribocchi 4'; Pellegrino (yellow card) 53'; Valdés 70'; Ascentis 73'	Stadium: Stadio Friuli; Attendance: 17,292; Referee: Nicola Pierpaoli

25 October 2009 9	Palermo	1–0	Udinese	Palermo
15:00 CET (UTC+01:00)	Bovo (yellow card) 18', (goal) 87'; Migliaccio (yellow card) 65'	Report	Sánchez (yellow card) 32'; Basta (yellow card) 67'	Stadium: Stadio Renzo Barbera; Attendance: 20,834; Referee: Andrea De Marco

28 October 2009 10	Udinese	2–1	Roma	Udine
20:45 CET (UTC+01:00)	Pasquale (yellow card) 15'; Floro Flores 21', 84'; Inler (yellow card) 26'; D'Agostino (yellow card) 39'; Basta (yellow card) 62' (yellow-red card) 78'; Di Natale (yellow card) 88'	Report	De Rossi 42', (yellow card) 61'; Cassetti (yellow card) 44'; Taddei (red card) 48'; Motta (yellow card) 66'; Guberti (yellow card) 76'	Stadium: Stadio Friuli; Attendance: 16,563; Referee: Antonio Damato

1 November 2009 11	Chievo	1–1	Udinese	Verona
15:00 CET (UTC+01:00)	Marcolini (yellow card) 45+3'; Iori (yellow card) 56'; Yepes 71'	Report	Floro Flores 27'; Inler (yellow card) 37'; D'Agostino (yellow card) 45+2'	Stadium: Stadio Marc'Antonio Bentegodi; Attendance: 8,793; Referee: Andrea Gervasoni

8 November 2009 12	Udinese	0–1	Fiorentina	Udine
15:00 CET (UTC+01:00)	Zapata (yellow card) 83'; Coda (yellow card) 86'; Di Natale (yellow card) 88'	Report	Montolivo (yellow card) 18'; Comotto (yellow card) 44'; Castillo (yellow card) 62'; Vargas 84'; Marchionni (yellow card) 87'	Stadium: Stadio Friuli; Attendance: 17,736; Referee: Carmine Russo

22 November 2009 13	Juventus	1–0	Udinese	Turin
20:45 CET (UTC+01:00)	Diego (yellow card) 45+1'; Grosso 51'; Del Piero (yellow card) 88'; Poulsen (yellow card) 90'	Report	Asamoah (yellow card) 36'; Handanović (yellow card) 45+2'	Stadium: Stadio Olimpico di Torino; Attendance: 23,609; Referee: Christian Brighi

28 November 2009 14	Udinese	2–0	Livorno	Udine
18:00 CET (UTC+01:00)	Di Natale 29'; Floro Flores 38'; Domizzi (yellow card) 41'	Report	Knežević (yellow card) 28'; Moro (yellow card) 49'; Filippini (yellow card) 65'	Stadium: Stadio Friuli; Attendance: 14,703; Referee: Maurizio Ciampi

6 December 2009 15	Bologna	2–1	Udinese	Bologna
15:00 CET (UTC+01:00)	Zenoni (yellow card) 21'; Adaílton 27'; Mudingayi (yellow card) 59'; Di Vaio 65' (pen.); Portanova (yellow card) 81'	Report	Di Natale 45+2' (pen.); Luković (yellow card) 55'; Zapata (yellow card) 68'; Isla (yellow card) 90+4'	Stadium: Stadio Renato Dall'Ara; Attendance: 14,618; Referee: Antonio Danilo Giannoccaro

13 December 2009 16	Siena	2–1	Udinese	Siena
15:00 CET (UTC+01:00)	Maccarone 66'; Genevier (yellow card) 68'; Ekdal (yellow card) 70'; Rosi (yellow card) 87'; Ghezzal 90+1'	Report	Inler (yellow card) 52'; D'Agostino 90+3'	Stadium: Stadio Artemio Franchi – Montepaschi Arena; Attendance: 9,248; Referee: Dino Tommasi

24 February 2009 17	Udinese	2–1	Cagliari	Udine
18:30 CET (UTC+01:00)	Coda (yellow card) 25'; Sánchez 68'; Di Natale 70'; Cuadrado (yellow card) 83'	Report	Jeda 2'; Canini (yellow card) 33'; Conti (yellow card) 84'	Stadium: Stadio Friuli; Attendance: 14,922; Referee: Matteo Trefoloni

6 January 2010 18	Bari	2–0	Udinese	Bari
20:30 CET (UTC+01:00)	Meggiorini 6'; Barreto 68'	Report		Stadium: Stadio San Nicola; Attendance: 17,828; Referee: Paolo Mazzoleni

10 January 2010 19	Udinese	1–1	Lazio	Udine
15:00 CET (UTC+01:00)	Di Natale 27'; Inler (yellow card) 58'	Report	Stendardo (yellow card) 3'; Floccari 16'; Lichtsteiner (yellow card) 23'; Kolarov (yellow card) 66'; Firmani (yellow card) 86'	Stadium: Stadio Friuli; Attendance: 15,044; Referee: Mauro Bergonzi

17 January 2010 20	Parma	0–0	Udinese	Parma
15:00 CET (UTC+01:00)	Galloppa (red card) 31'; Lucarelli (yellow card) 38'; Zaccardo (yellow card) 44'; Lanzafame (yellow card) 84'	Report	Zapata (yellow card) 24'; Di Natale (yellow card) 38'; Isla (yellow card) 52'; Basta (yellow card) 66'	Stadium: Stadio Ennio Tardini; Attendance: 14,839; Referee: Leonardo Baracani

24 January 2010 21	Udinese	2–3	Sampdoria	Udine
15:00 CET (UTC+01:00)	Di Natale 7' (pen.); Coda (yellow card) 30'; Isla 44'; Sammarco (yellow card) 72'; Sánchez (yellow card) 82'	Report	Mannini (yellow card) 15'; Pozzi (yellow card) 24', (goal) 56'; Gastaldello (yellow card) 26'; Pazzini 27' (pen.); Lucchini (yellow card) 37'; Semioli 66', (yellow card) 73'	Stadium: Stadio Friuli; Attendance: 16,167; Referee: Carmine Russo

31 January 2010 22	Catania	1–1	Udinese	Catania
15:00 CET (UTC+01:00)	Silvestre (yellow card) 13'; Llama (yellow card) 49'; Biagianti 80'	Report	Floro Flores 33'; Sánchez (yellow card) 41'; Handanović (yellow card) 69'; D'Agostino (yellow card) 75'; Zapata (yellow card) 90'	Stadium: Stadio Angelo Massimino; Attendance: 13,321; Referee: Andrea Romeo

7 February 2010 23	Udinese	3–1	Napoli	Udine
15:00 CET (UTC+01:00)	Di Natale 7', 90+1', 90+3'; Luković (yellow card) 51'; Pasquale (yellow card) 74'; Inler (yellow card) 87'	Report	Maggio (yellow card) 7' (yellow-red card) 44', (goal) 21'; Cannavaro (yellow card) 24'; Pazienza (yellow card) 81'	Stadium: Stadio Friuli; Attendance: 20,084; Referee: Antonio Damato

12 February 2010 24	Milan	3–2	Udinese	Milan
20:45 CET (UTC+01:00)	Huntelaar 7', 57'; Pato 39'; Gattuso (yellow card) 59'	Report	Zapata (yellow card) 19'; Sammarco (yellow card) 40'; Floro Flores 45+1'; Isla (yellow card) 56'; Lodi (yellow card) 79'; Di Natale 87'	Stadium: San Siro; Attendance: 33,837; Referee: Domenico Celi

20 February 2010 25	Genoa	3–0	Udinese	Genoa
18:00 CET (UTC+01:00)	Rossi (yellow card) 26'; Acquafresca 30', 53' (pen.); Papastathopoulos (yellow card) 50'; Palacio 64'; Zapater (yellow card) 75'	Report	Pasquale (yellow card) 39'; Zapata (yellow card) 45+1' (yellow-red card) 57'; Coda (yellow card) 52'	Stadium: Stadio Luigi Ferraris; Attendance: 24,831; Referee: Roberto Rosetti

28 February 2010 26	Udinese	2–3	Internazionale	Udine
15:00 CET (UTC+01:00)	Pepe 2'; Coda (yellow card) 8'; Di Natale 52' (pen.); Sammarco (yellow card) 67'; Asamoah (yellow card) 90+3'	Report	Balotelli 6', (yellow card) 68'; Maicon 21'; Zanetti (yellow card) 39'; Milito 45+1'; Stanković (yellow card) 90+2'	Stadium: Stadio Friuli; Attendance: 23,874; Referee: Mauro Bergonzi

7 March 2010 27	Atalanta	0–0	Udinese	Bergamo
15:00 CET (UTC+01:00)		Report		Stadium: Stadio Atleti Azzurri d'Italia; Attendance: 13,023; Referee: Antonio Danilo Giannoccaro

14 March 2010 28	Udinese	3–2	Palermo	Udine
15:00 CET (UTC+01:00)	Floro Flores 44', 65'; Asamoah 71'	Report	Simplício 51'; Cavani 80'	Stadium: Stadio Friuli; Attendance: 17,313; Referee: Paolo Tagliavento

20 March 2010 29	Roma	4–2	Udinese	Rome
20:45 CET (UTC+01:00)	Toni 16'; Vučinić 23', 66' (pen.), 82'	Report	Di Natale 38' (pen.), 61'	Stadium: Stadio Olimpico; Attendance: 34,138; Referee: Nicola Pierpaoli

24 March 2010 30	Udinese	0–0	Chievo	Udine
20:45 CET (UTC+01:00)		Report		Stadium: Stadio Friuli; Attendance: 14,950; Referee: Paolo Mazzoleni

28 March 2010 31	Fiorentina	4–1	Udinese	Florence
15:00 CEST (UTC+02:00)	Vargas 36'; Gilardino 56'; Santana 68'; Jovetić 85'	Report	Pepe 41'	Stadium: Stadio Artemio Franchi; Attendance: 25,418; Referee: Gabriele Gava

3 April 2010 32	Udinese	3–0	Juventus	Udine
21:00 CEST (UTC+02:00)	Sánchez 9'; Pepe 65'; Di Natale 76'	Report		Stadium: Stadio Friuli; Attendance: 22,390; Referee: Gianluca Rocchi

11 April 2010 33	Livorno	0–2	Udinese	Livorno
15:00 CEST (UTC+02:00)		Report	Sánchez 9'; Di Natale 35'	Stadium: Stadio Armando Picchi; Attendance: 8,494; Referee: Christian Brighi

18 April 2010 34	Udinese	1–1	Bologna	Udine
15:00 CEST (UTC+02:00)	Di Natale 90+1'	Report	Zapata 4' (o.g.)	Stadium: Stadio Friuli; Attendance: 17,570; Referee: Emidio Morganti

25 April 2010 35	Udinese	4–1	Siena	Udine
15:00 CEST (UTC+02:00)	Pepe 19', 42'; Sánchez 61'; Di Natale 81' (pen.)	Report	Calaiò 41'; Vergassola (yellow card) 57'; Cribari (yellow card) 68'; Malagò (yellow card) 80'	Stadium: Stadio Friuli; Attendance: 16,033; Referee: Roberto Rosetti

2 May 2010 36	Cagliari	2–2	Udinese	Cagliari
15:00 CEST (UTC+02:00)	Lazzari 15'; Jeda 58'	Report	Di Natale 26'; Sánchez 28'; Domizzi (yellow card) 67'	Stadium: Stadio Sant'Elia; Referee: Maurizio Ciampi

9 May 2010 37	Udinese	3–3	Bari	Udine
15:00 CEST (UTC+02:00)	Di Natale 21', 63'; Pepe 26'; Luković (yellow card) 53'; Handanović (yellow card) 90+1'	Report	Barreto 18', (yellow card) 20'; Belmonte (yellow card) 33'; Koman 39'; Almirón 90+3'	Stadium: Stadio Friuli; Attendance: 17,898; Referee: Riccardo Pinzani

15 May 2010 38	Lazio	3–1	Udinese	Rome
20:45 CEST (UTC+02:00)	Hitzlsperger 16'; Floccari 45'; Brocchi 53'; Siviglia (yellow card) 69'; Diakité (yellow card) 81'	Report	Di Natale 30'; Isla (red card) 37'	Stadium: Stadio Olimpico; Attendance: 34,455; Referee: Marco Guida

=== Coppa Italia ===
14 January 2010 Round of 16	Udinese	2–0	Lumezzane	Udine
18:00 CET (UTC+01:00)	Lodi 44' (pen.); Corradi 61'			Stadium: Stadio Friuli; Attendance: 1,794; Referee: Riccardo Tozzi

27 January 2010 Quarter-finals	Milan	0–1	Udinese	Milan
21:00 CET (UTC+01:00)			Inler 56'	Stadium: San Siro; Attendance: 5,513; Referee: Andrea Gervasoni

4 February 2010 Semi-finals; First leg	Roma	2–0	Udinese	Rome
21:00 CET (UTC+01:00)	Vučinić 12'; Mexès 40'		D'Agostino (yellow card) 22'; Isla (yellow card) 87'	Stadium: Stadio Olimpico; Attendance: 19,746; Referee: Mauro Bergonzi

21 April 2010 Semi-finals; Second leg	Udinese	1–0 (1–2 agg.)	Roma	Udine
18:00 CEST (UTC+02:00)	Sánchez 81', (yellow card) 85'		Cassetti (yellow card) 58' (yellow-red card) 84'	Stadium: Stadio Friuli; Attendance: 20,000; Referee: Luca Banti

== Statistics ==
=== Appearances and goals ===
No.	Pos.	Player	Serie A				Coppa Italia				Total
No.	Pos.	Player	App.	Goal			App.	Goal			App.	Goal
1	GK	(Venezuela) Rafael Romo	1	-3	0	0					1	-3	0	0
2	DF	(Colombia) Cristián Zapata	31	0	8	1	4	0	0	0	35	0	8	1
3	MF	(Chile) Mauricio Isla	30	1	5	1	3	0	1	0	33	1	6	1
4	DF	(Colombia) Juan Cuadrado	11	0	3	0	1	0	0	0	12	0	3	0
5	MF	(Nigeria) Christian Obodo	1	0	0	0					1	0	0	0
6	GK	(Italy) Emanuele Belardi					1	0	0	0	1	0	0	0
7	FW	(Italy) Simone Pepe	32	7	5	0	4	0	0	0	36	7	5	0
8	MF	(Serbia) Dušan Basta	16	0	3	1					16	0	3	1
9	FW	(Italy) Bernardo Corradi	19	0	1	0	2	1	0	0	21	1	1	0
10	FW	(Italy) Antonio Di Natale	35	29	6	0	3	0	0	0	39	29	6	0
11	FW	(Chile) Alexis Sánchez	32	5	4	0	4	1	1	0	36	6	5	0
13	DF	(Italy) Andrea Coda	26	0	7	0	3	0	0	0	29	0	7	0
14	MF	(Italy) Paolo Sammarco	26	0	4	0	4	0	0	0	30	0	4	0
15	DF	(Colombia) Ricardo Chará					1	0	0	0	1	0	0	0
16	MF	(Russia) Viktor Budyanskiy
17	FW	(Brazil) Alemão
19	MF	(Ghana) Emmanuel Badu	5	0	0	0					5	0	0	0
20	MF	(Ghana) K. Asamoah	25	1	2	0	2	0	0	0	27	1	2	0
21	MF	(Italy) D'Agostino	20	1	3	0	2	0	2	0	22	1	5	0
22	GK	(Slovenia) Handanovič	37	-56	4	0	3	-2	0	0	40	-58	4	0
23	MF	(Spain) Jaime Romero	4	0	0	0					4	0	0	0
24	DF	(Serbia) Aleksandar Luković	34	0	8	0	3	0	0	0	37	0	8	0
26	DF	(Italy) Giovanni Pasquale	22	0	7	0	3	0	0	0	25	0	7	0
No.	Pos.	Player	App.	Goal			App.	Goal			App.	Goal
No.	Pos.	Player	Serie A				Coppa Italia				Total

=== Goalscorers ===
Rank	No.	Pos	Nat	Name	Serie A	Coppa Italia	Total
1	10	FW	(Italy)	Antonio Di Natale	29	0	29
2	83	FW	(Italy)	Antonio Floro Flores	9	0	9
3	7	MF	(Italy)	Simone Pepe	7	0	7
4	11	FW	(Chile)	Alexis Sánchez	5	1	6
5	84	MF	(Italy)	Francesco Lodi	1	1	2
6	3	MF	(Chile)	Mauricio Isla	1	0	1
6	9	FW	(Italy)	Bernardo Corradi	0	1	1
6	20	MF	(Ghana)	Kwadwo Asamoah	1	0	1
6	21	MF	(Italy)	Gaetano D'Agostino	1	0	1
6	88	MF	(Switzerland)	Gökhan Inler	0	1	1
Own goal					0	0	0
Totals					54	4	58

Last updated: 15 May 2010
