= Milani =

Milani (or Milāni) is an Italian and Iranian surname. Notable people with the surname include:

- Abbas Milani (born 1949), Iranian-American historian and author
- Alfredo Milani (1924–2017), Italian motorcycle racer
- Andrea Milani, several people
  - Andrea Milani (footballer born 1919), Italian footballer with Inter Milan and Palermo
  - Andrea Milani (footballer born 1980), Italian footballer with Ancona
  - Andrea Milani (1948–2018), Italian mathematician
- Aureliano Milani (1675–1749), Italian Baroque painter
- Aurelio Milani (1934–2014), Italian footballer
- Cesare Milani (1905–1956), Italian Olympic rower
- Fadhil al-Milani (born 1944), Iraqi-Iranian jurist and professor
- Gilberto Milani (1932–2021), Italian motorcycle racer
- Giulio Cesare Milani (c. 1621–1678), Italian Baroque painter
- Laura Milani (born 1984), Italian rower
- Leyla Milani (born 1982), Canadian model, actress, TV host, and fashion designer
- Lili Milani (born 1981), Estonian geneticist
- Lorenzo Milani (1923–1967), Italian Roman Catholic priest
- Marta Milani (born 1987), Italian sprint athlete
- Mino Milani (1928–2022), Italian writer, cartoonist, journalist and historian
- Mohammad Hadi al-Milani (1895–1975) Iraqi-Iranian senior jurist
- Oscar Milani (born 1946), Argentine harpsichordist
- Tahmineh Milani (born 1960), Iranian film director, screenwriter, and producer

== See also ==
- 4701 Milani, a main-belt asteroid
