= Cilli =

Cilli may refer to:

- Cilli, German name for Celje, Slovenian town
- County of Cilli, a medieval county in Slovenia
- Daniele Cilli (born 1988), Italian professional football

== See also ==
- Catherine of Cilli (disambiguation)
