= 2009 Paraguayan Primera División season =

- Season: 2009
- Champions: Apertura: Cerro Porteño (28th title); Clausura: Nacional (7th title)
- Relegated: 12 de Octubre; 2 de Mayo
- Copa Libertadores: Cerro Porteño; Nacional; Libertad
- Copa Sudamericana: Cerro Porteño; Olimpia; Guaraní
- Top goalscorer: Apertura: Pablo Velázquez (16 goals); Clausura: César Cáceres (11 goals)

The 2009 Paraguayan Primera División season, officially the 2009 Copa TIGO for sponsorship reasons, is the 75th season of top-flight professional football in Paraguay. It is the second season in which a champion will be crowned for each tournament.

== Teams ==
Locations of the 2009 Primera División teams

| Team | Home city | Stadium | Capacity |
|---|---|---|---|
| 2 de Mayo | Pedro Juan Caballero | Río Parapití | 25,000 |
| 3 de Febrero | Ciudad del Este | Antonio Oddone Sarubbi | 28,000 |
| 12 de Octubre | Itauguá | Juan Canuto Pettengill | 8,000 |
| Cerro Porteño | Asunción | General Pablo Rojas | 32,000 |
| Guaraní | Asunción | Rogelio Livieres | 6,000 |
| Libertad | Asunción | Dr. Nicolás Leoz | 10,000 |
| Nacional | Asunción | Arsenio Erico | 4,000 |
| Olimpia | Asunción | Manuel Ferreira | 15,000 |
| Rubio Ñu | Asunción | La Arboleda | 5,000 |
| Sol de América | Villa Elisa | Luis Alfonso Giagni | 5,000 |
| Sportivo Luqueño | Luque | Feliciano Cáceres | 25,000 |
| Tacuary | Asunción | Roberto Béttega | 7,000 |

== Torneo Apertura ==
The Campeonato de Apertura, also the Torneo TIGO Apertura for sponsorship reasons, is the first championship of the season. It began on February 14 and ended on July 5. The championship is officially called the Centenario del Club Sol de América to commemorate the 100th anniversary of the foundation of Club Sol de América.

| Pos | Team | Pld | W | D | L | GF | GA | GD | Pts | Qualification or relegation |
|---|---|---|---|---|---|---|---|---|---|---|
| 1 | Cerro Porteño (C, Q) | 22 | 14 | 4 | 4 | 24 | 11 | +13 | 46 | 2010 Copa Libertadores Second Stage |
| 2 | Libertad | 22 | 12 | 6 | 4 | 46 | 19 | +27 | 42 | |
| 3 | Nacional | 22 | 9 | 9 | 4 | 37 | 23 | +14 | 36 | |
| 4 | Olimpia | 22 | 9 | 8 | 5 | 31 | 28 | +3 | 35 | |
| 5 | Tacuary | 22 | 9 | 5 | 8 | 27 | 29 | −2 | 32 | |
| 6 | Sportivo Luqueño | 22 | 8 | 7 | 7 | 26 | 24 | +2 | 31 | |
| 7 | Guaraní | 22 | 7 | 8 | 7 | 21 | 17 | +4 | 29 | |
| 8 | Rubio Ñu | 22 | 8 | 2 | 12 | 30 | 34 | −4 | 26 | |
| 9 | Sol de América | 22 | 6 | 7 | 9 | 21 | 30 | −9 | 25 | |
| 10 | 12 de Octubre | 22 | 6 | 6 | 10 | 19 | 30 | −11 | 24 | |
| 11 | 2 de Mayo | 22 | 4 | 6 | 12 | 23 | 34 | −11 | 18 | |
| 12 | 3 de Febrero | 22 | 5 | 2 | 15 | 21 | 47 | −26 | 17 | |

Updated to match(es) played on July 5, 2009. Source: RSSSF
Rules for classification: 1st points. If two teams are tied on points, a playoff game will be held to break the tie. If more than two clubs are tied on points, the following will be used as a tiebreaker: 1st goal difference; 2nd goals scored; 3rd away-goals scored; 4th draw of lots
(C) Champions; (Q) Qualified for the phase indicated

Copa TIGO
2009 Apertura "Centenario del Club Sol de América" Champion
Cerro Porteño
28th title

== Torneo Clausura ==
The Campeonato de Clausura, also the Torneo Tigo Clausura for sponsorship reasons, is the second championship of the season. It began on July 25 and end on December 13. The championship is officially called the Campeones de América – 1953 to commemorate the Paraguayan national team's 1953 South American Championship title.

| Pos | Team | Pld | W | D | L | GF | GA | GD | Pts | Qualification or relegation |
|---|---|---|---|---|---|---|---|---|---|---|
| 1 | Nacional | 22 | 12 | 5 | 5 | 29 | 16 | +13 | 41 | 2010 Copa Libertadores Second Stage |
| 2 | Libertad | 22 | 12 | 4 | 6 | 31 | 20 | +11 | 40 | |
| 3 | Guaraní | 22 | 11 | 5 | 6 | 30 | 21 | +9 | 38 | |
| 4 | Rubio Ñu | 22 | 10 | 7 | 5 | 29 | 22 | +7 | 37 | |
| 5 | Olimpia | 22 | 11 | 2 | 9 | 32 | 22 | +10 | 35 | |
| 6 | Cerro Porteño | 22 | 9 | 8 | 5 | 28 | 25 | +3 | 35 | |
| 7 | Tacuary | 22 | 9 | 5 | 8 | 25 | 31 | −6 | 32 | |
| 8 | 3 de Febrero | 22 | 7 | 5 | 10 | 24 | 35 | −11 | 26 | |
| 9 | Sol de América | 22 | 7 | 4 | 11 | 25 | 30 | −5 | 25 | |
| 10 | 2 de Mayo | 22 | 6 | 4 | 12 | 25 | 27 | −2 | 22 | |
| 11 | Sportivo Luqueño | 22 | 5 | 5 | 12 | 19 | 32 | −13 | 20 | |
| 12 | 12 de Octubre | 22 | 5 | 2 | 15 | 17 | 33 | −16 | 17 | |

Updated to match(es) played on December 13, 2009. Source: FIFA
Rules for classification: 1st points. If two teams are tied on points, a playoff game will be held to break the tie. If more than two clubs are tied on points, the following will be used as a tiebreaker: 1st goal difference; 2nd goals scored; 3rd away-goals scored; 4th draw of lots

Copa TIGO
2009 Clausura "Campeones de América – 1953" Champion
Nacional
7th title

== International qualification ==
The two tournament champions earn the Paraguay 1 and Paraguay 2 berths in the Second Stage of the 2010 Copa Libertadores. All remaining international qualification will be determined through a season-wide aggregate table. The Paraguay 3 in the 2010 Copa Libertadores berth goes to the best-placed non-champion. For the 2010 Copa Sudamericana, the Paraguay 1 berth goes to the highest placed champion. Paraguay 2 and Paraguay 3 will go to the highest placed teams who have not qualified to an international tournament.

| Pos | Team | Pld | W | D | L | GF | GA | GD | Pts | Qualification or relegation |
|---|---|---|---|---|---|---|---|---|---|---|
| 1 | Libertad (Q) | 44 | 24 | 10 | 10 | 77 | 39 | +38 | 82 | 2010 Copa Libertadores First Stage |
| 2 | Cerro Porteño | 44 | 23 | 12 | 9 | 52 | 36 | +16 | 81 | 2010 Copa Sudamericana Second Stage |
| 3 | Nacional | 44 | 21 | 14 | 9 | 66 | 39 | +27 | 77 | |
| 4 | Olimpia | 44 | 20 | 10 | 14 | 63 | 50 | +13 | 70 | 2010 Copa Sudamericana First Stage |
| 5 | Guaraní | 44 | 18 | 13 | 13 | 51 | 38 | +13 | 67 | 2010 Copa Sudamericana First Stage |
| 6 | Tacuary | 44 | 18 | 10 | 16 | 52 | 60 | −8 | 64 | |
| 7 | Rubio Ñu | 44 | 18 | 9 | 17 | 59 | 56 | +3 | 63 | |
| 8 | Sportivo Luqueño | 44 | 13 | 12 | 19 | 45 | 56 | −11 | 51 | |
| 9 | Sol de América | 44 | 13 | 11 | 20 | 46 | 60 | −14 | 50 | |
| 10 | 3 de Febrero | 44 | 12 | 7 | 25 | 45 | 82 | −37 | 43 | |
| 11 | 12 de Octubre | 44 | 11 | 8 | 25 | 36 | 63 | −27 | 41 | |
| 12 | 2 de Mayo | 44 | 10 | 10 | 24 | 48 | 61 | −13 | 40 | |

Updated to match(es) played on December 9, 2009. Source:
Rules for classification: 1st points. If two teams are tied on points, a playoff game will be held to break the tie. If more than two clubs are tied on points, the following will be used as a tiebreaker: 1st goal difference; 2nd goals scored; 3rd away-goals scored; 4th draw of lots
(Q) Qualified for the phase indicated

== Relegation ==
Relegations is determined at the end of the season by computing an average (Spanish: promedio) of the number of points earned per game over the past three seasons. The team with the lowest average is relegated to the División Intermedia for the following season. The next lowest team plays a relegation/promotion playoff match against the 2009 División Intermedia runner-up.

| Pos | Team | '07 Pts | '08 Pts | '09 Pts | Total Pts | Total Pld | Avg |
|---|---|---|---|---|---|---|---|
| 1 | Libertad | 95 | 101 | 82 | 278 | 132 | 2.1061 |
| 2 | Cerro Porteño | 93 | 76 | 81 | 248 | 132 | 1.8788 |
| 3 | Nacional | 60 | 77 | 77 | 214 | 132 | 1.6212 |
| 4 | Olimpia | 76 | 54 | 70 | 200 | 132 | 1.5152 |
| 5 | Rubio Ñú | 0 | 0 | 63 | 63 | 44 | 1.4318 |
| 6 | Guaraní | 41 | 79 | 67 | 187 | 132 | 1.4167 |
| 7 | Sol de América | 57 | 63 | 50 | 170 | 132 | 1.2879 |
| 8 | Tacuary | 51 | 52 | 64 | 169 | 132 | 1.2803 |
| 9 | Sportivo Luqueño | 65 | 49 | 51 | 166 | 132 | 1.2576 |
| 10 | 3 de Febrero | 49 | 50 | 43 | 143 | 132 | 1.0833 |
| 11 | 12 de Octubre | 49 | 49 | 41 | 138 | 132 | 1.0455 |
| 12 | 2 de Mayo | 34 | 53 | 40 | 127 | 132 | 0.9621 |

Updated as of December 13, 2009.
Source: APF

| Relegation play-off match |
| Relegated to the División Intermedia |

=== Relegation/promotion playoff ===
The relegation/promotion playoff was contested over two legs. The team who earned the most points over two legs was promoted— or remained —in the Primera División. Should there be a tie in points, goal difference was taken into account, followed a penalty shootout if needed. Sport Colombia played at home during the second leg.

| Team #1 | Points earned | Team #2 | 1st leg | 2nd leg |
|---|---|---|---|---|
| Sport Colombia | 2–2 (3–0 pk) | 12 de Octubre | 1–1 | 2–2 |

== See also ==
- 2009 in Paraguayan football
- List of transfers of the Primera División Paraguaya 2009
