= Mauricio Isla =

Chilean footballer (born 1988)

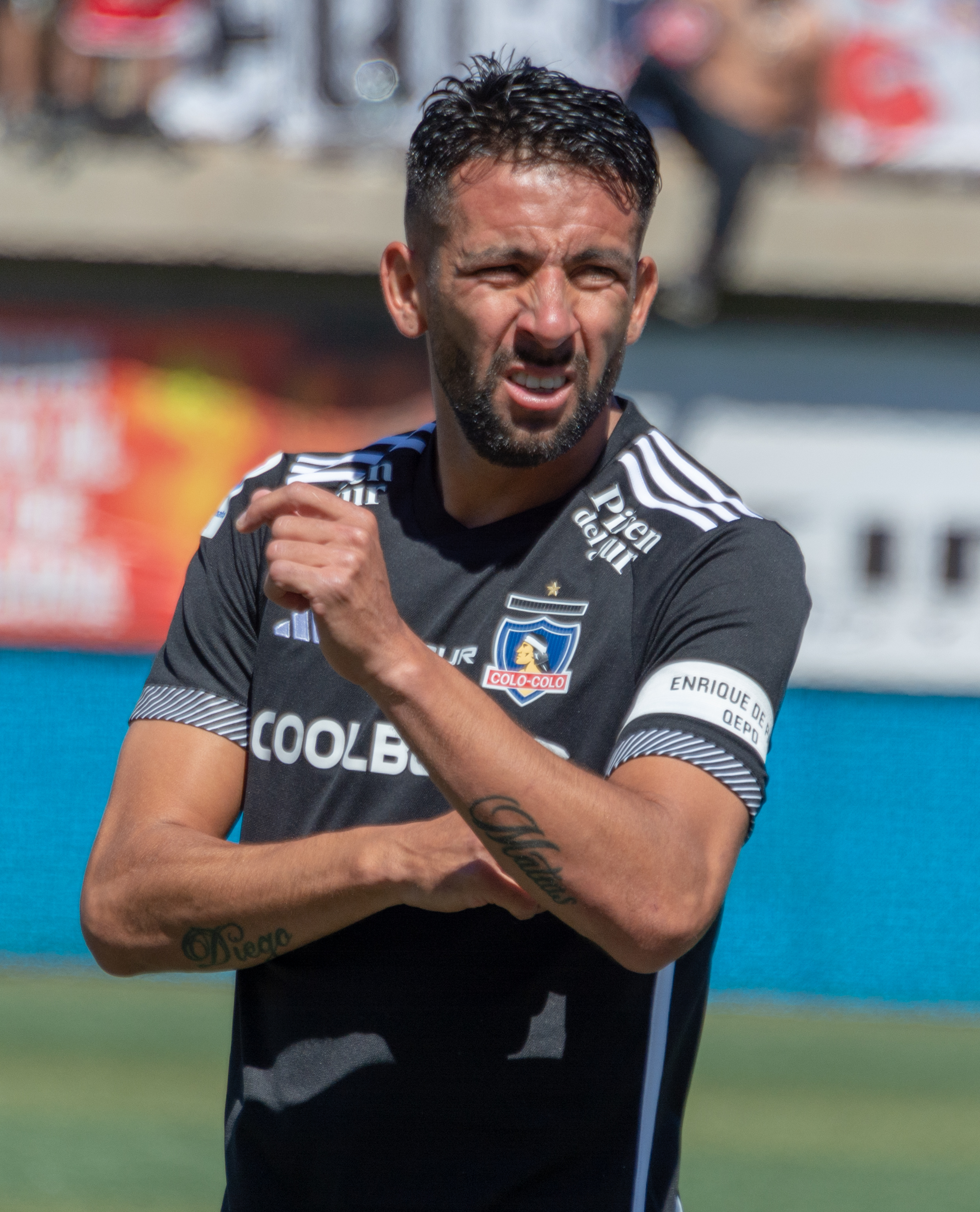
- Isla with Colo-Colo in 2024

Personal information
- Full name: Mauricio Aníbal Isla Isla
- Date of birth: 12 June 1988 (age 38)
- Place of birth: Buin, Chile
- Height: 1.77 m (5 ft 9 1/2 in)
- Positions: Right-back; midfielder

Youth career
- Huracán de Maipo
- 1999–2007: Universidad Católica

Senior career*
Years	Team	Apps	(Gls)
2007–2012	Udinese	127	(6)
2012–2016	Juventus	30	(0)
2014–2015	→ Queens Park Rangers (loan)	26	(0)
2015–2016	→ Marseille (loan)	23	(2)
2016–2017	Cagliari	34	(1)
2017–2020	Fenerbahçe	68	(0)
2020–2022	Flamengo	50	(3)
2022–2023	Universidad Católica	22	(1)
2023–2024	Independiente	29	(2)
2024–2025	Colo-Colo	35	(1)
Total		444	(16)

International career
2004	Chile U15		
2005	Chile U17		
2007	Chile U20	16	(2)
2007–2025	Chile	145	(5)
Medal record
Men's football
Representing Chile
Copa América
Winner	2015 Chile
Winner	2016 United States
FIFA Confederations Cup
Runner-up	2017 Russia
FIFA U-20 World Cup
Third place	2007 Canada
- * Club domestic league appearances and goals

Mauricio Aníbal Isla Isla (Latin American Spanish: [mawˈɾisjo ˈisla]; born 12 June 1988) is a Chilean former professional footballer who played as a right-back and midfielder.

Isla started his career in the youth system of Universidad Católica, and later moved to Italian club Udinese in 2007, where he made his professional debut. His performances earned him a transfer to defending Serie A Champions Juventus, where he won consecutive league titles during his first two seasons with the team. In 2014, Isla was sent on loan for a season to English side Queens Park Rangers, while he also spent the next season on loan with French club Marseille.

Isla has earned over 140 caps for Chile since his debut in 2007, and represented the nation in two FIFA World Cups (in 2010 and 2014) as well as six Copa América tournaments (in 2011, 2015, 2016, 2019, 2021, and 2024), winning the 2015 and 2016 editions.

== Club career ==
=== Early years ===
As a child, Isla was with Huracán de Maipo from Buin. Next, he started in the youth ranks of Universidad Católica in 1999 as a forward. However his lack of height caused him to switch positions to defender, as U Católica lacked quality youth defenders. Isla played well enough in the new position to earn a call-up to the first team in 2006, but never played an official match and in 2007, coach José del Solar sent him back to the youth team.

=== Udinese ===
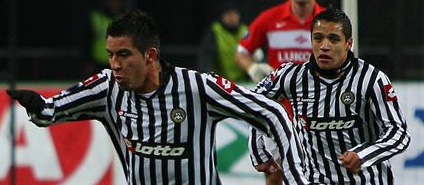
Isla (left) and fellow Chilean Alexis Sánchez with Udinese in a UEFA Cup match in 2008

Isla had a notable performance during the summer of 2007 in the 2007 FIFA U-20 World Cup in Canada and was thereafter signed by Udinese of the Serie A in Italy on a five-year contract. He can both defend and attack and has been known to turn innocent possession-based games into quick-paced counter-attacks with ease. His technique is well accompanied by a surprising pace and stamina.

Isla made his professional debut on 19 December 2007 versus Palermo in the Coppa Italia. On 8 March 2008, Isla played his first game as a starter in Serie A also against Palermo, a game which ended in a 1–1 draw. After the departure of Simone Pepe, Isla often played as a right wing-back in a 3–5–2 formation during Udinese's 2010–11 Serie A campaign, due to a long-term injury to Dušan Basta. In that season, he was instrumental in helping Udinese finish fourth, thus gaining qualification to the 2011–12 UEFA Champions League play-off round.

=== Juventus ===
On 15 June 2012, Juventus announced Isla's arrival to a medical ahead of a prospective move to join the team for the upcoming 2012–13 season. Following his move to Juventus, Isla said moving to Juventus was his dream come true and that he was excited to join his Chilean team-mate Arturo Vidal. Isla told TVN:

This is a dream come true: We are going to be the strongest team in Italy. It is important for me as a player, but it is also vital for my family. I have been working for years to get to this point. In Udine I became a professional. But I have always said that sooner or later I would go to a bigger club like Juve. There I can challenge for trophies. I want to play and win something important, like the Champions League.

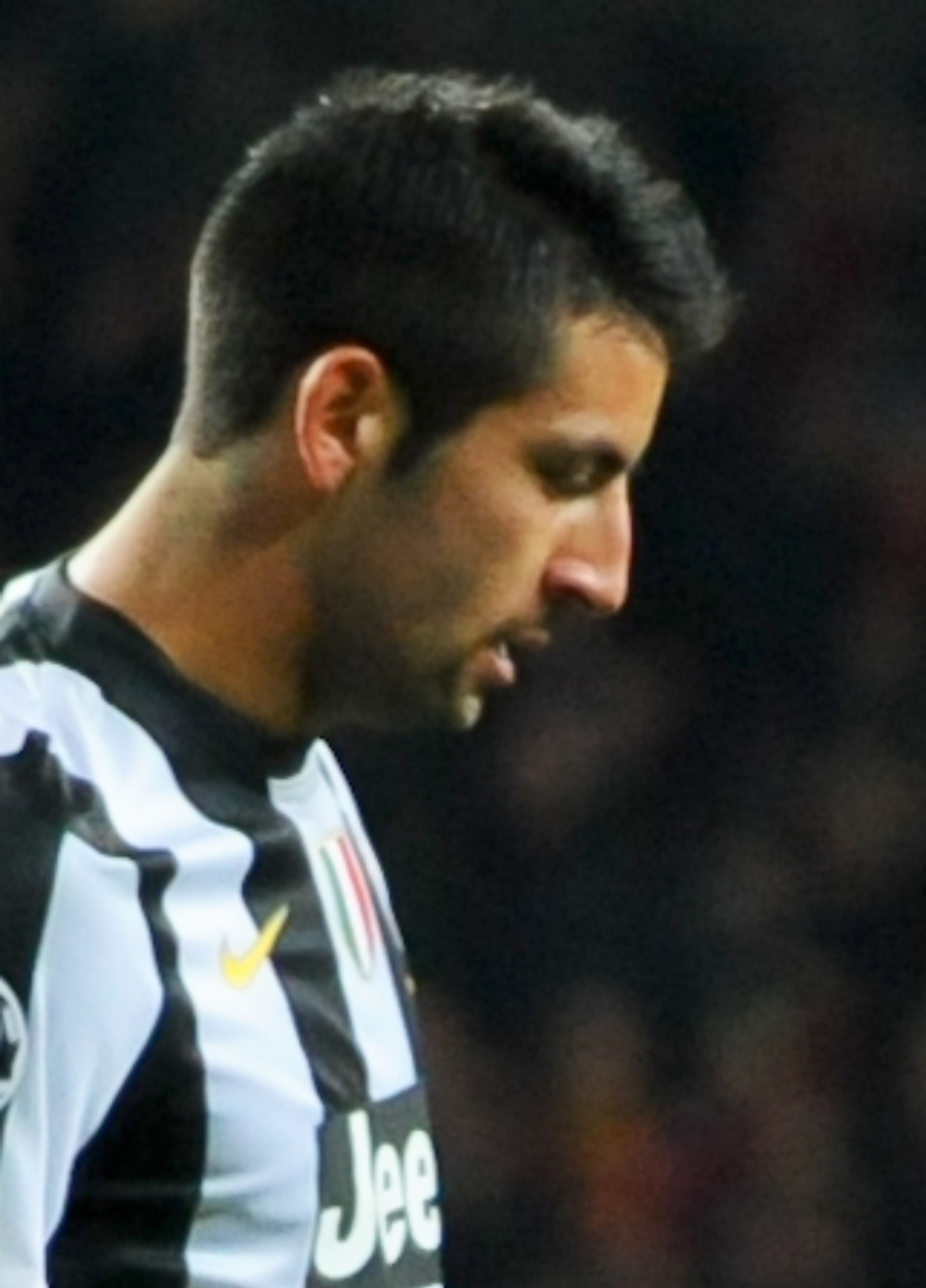
Isla with Juventus in 2012

==== Loan to Queens Park Rangers ====
On 6 August 2014, Isla joined Queens Park Rangers on loan for the 2014–15 Premier League season, with an option of a permanent deal at the end of the season for a reported £8 million fee. He made his debut away against Tottenham Hotspur. He made his home debut in the next league game against Sunderland, adapting to a new right-back role in a changed formation, helping the R's to their first league win and clean sheet of the season. Isla adapted quickly to the Premier League and this was helped when he was joined at QPR by his national teammate and close friend Eduardo Vargas, who plays just in front of him in QPR's 4–4–2 formation. This started to show when he provided an assist for Charlie Austin against reigning Premier League champions Manchester City. After settling into life in West London, Isla signaled his intention to take up the option of making the loan permanent at the end of the season.

=== Later years ===
On 31 August 2015 Isla was loaned to Marseille by Juventus.

On 10 August 2016, Isla moved to Cagliari for a transfer fee of €4 million. He signed a three-year contract with his new club.

On 21 July 2017, Isla signed for Turkish side Fenerbahçe on a three-year contract for an undisclosed fee.

=== Flamengo ===
On 19 August 2020, Isla signed for Campeonato Brasileiro Série A club Flamengo a two-and-a-half-year contract on a free transfer. Isla debuted for Flamengo on 30 August 2020 as a halftime substitute in a Série A 1–0 win over Santos at Vila Belmiro. He was named the best right back in the league during the 2020 season as Flamengo won the league title.

=== Return to Chile ===
On 21 June 2022, Universidad Católica announced the signing of Isla on a two-and-a-half-year contract on a free transfer.

=== Independiente ===
After ending his contract with Universidad Católica, in August 2023 Isla joined Argentine Primera División side Independiente, where he became one of the leaders in the new team of Carlos Tevez.

=== Colo-Colo ===
In the second half of 2024, Isla returned to his homeland and signed with Colo-Colo. He adopted a shirt bearing the number '2+2', therefore making him mathematically '4', his favourite squad number, like Iván Zamorano wearing the number '1+8' in Inter Milan. He ended his contract in December 2025.

=== Retirement ===
On 7 September 2026, Isla announced his retirement from professional football, a career that started with the Chile national team on 7 September 2007 in the 2–1 away loss against Switzerland.

== International career ==
=== Youth ===
Isla took part with Chile at under-15 level in the 2004 South American Championship and with Chile U17 in the 2005 South American Championship.

=== 2007 FIFA U-20 World Cup ===
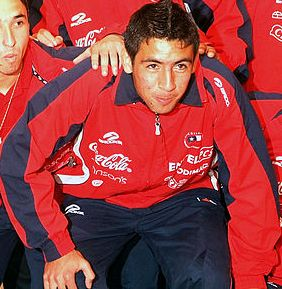
Isla with Chile under-20

Isla took part with Chile U20 in the 2007 South American Youth Championship, where Chile qualified for the 2007 FIFA U-20 World Cup. During the U-20 World Cup Isla was noticed worldwide for his skill with the ball and versatility. Isla was an integral part of the team that finished in third place. In the quarterfinal game versus Nigeria, Isla played defender, midfield, and forward due to a number of injuries to other squad members. The game went into extra time after finishing scoreless in regulation and in the added time, Chile scored four goals. Two of the goals came from Isla, one from the penalty spot. After each goal Isla ran over to the Chilean telecast camera (which was marked by a Chilean flag) and dedicated his goals to his grandmother and aunt, who was pregnant. This tournament and his performance in it led Isla to be transferred to Serie A team Udinese before his professional debut in the Chilean league, a very rare occurrence.

=== Senior ===
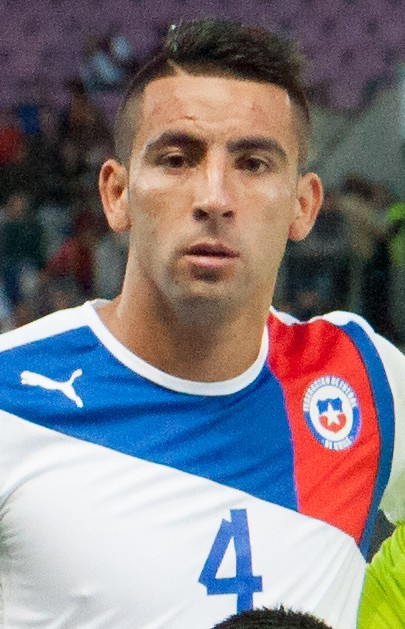
Isla with Chile in 2013

New Chilean coach Marcelo Bielsa called Isla up at the age of 19 for his first full Chile senior squad international cap in September 2007 in a friendly against Switzerland versus his club-mate Gökhan Inler. He started as a center midfielder. This was his debut as a professional player, before making his first team debut on Udinese. His strong performances earned another call-up in the next friendly against Israel, where he came on as a second-half substitute. He played his first 2010 FIFA World Cup qualification match in March 2009 as a starter versus Peru. Isla made another start against Uruguay where, in a scoreless draw, he was sent off after 33 minutes following two yellow cards. He was a starter in all of Chile's four 2010 World Cup games. He also played in 3 of 4 matches in the 2011 Copa América, and playing in 13 of 16 matches in the 2014 FIFA World Cup qualification.

At the 2015 Copa América on home soil, Isla scored the only goal in the 81st minute of a quarter-final win over holders Uruguay at the Estadio Nacional, putting Chile into the last four for the first time since 1999, as the team went on to win the tournament.

== Style of play ==
Isla primarily plays on the right flank as a wing-back, but he has also been deployed as a full-back or as a midfielder, both centrally and on the wing. He has occasionally played in defensive and offensive midfield roles.

== Career statistics ==
=== Club ===
As of match played 6 July 2025

Appearances and goals by club, season and competition
Club	Season	League			State league (Note: Includes Campeonato Carioca)		National cup (Note: Includes Coppa Italia, FA Cup, Coupe de France, Turkish Cup, Copa do Brasil, Copa Chile, Copa Argentina)		League cup (Note: Includes Coupe de la Ligue)		Continental		Other		Total	
Club	Season	Division	Apps	Goals	Apps	Goals	Apps	Goals	Apps	Goals	Apps	Goals	Apps	Goals	Apps	Goals
Udinese	2007–08	Serie A	10	0	—		0	0	—		—		—		10	0
Udinese	2008–09	Serie A	32	0	—		0	0	—		10 (Note: Appearances in UEFA Europa League)	0	—		42	0
Udinese	2009–10	Serie A	30	1	—		3	0	—		—		—		33	1
Udinese	2010–11	Serie A	34	2	—		1	1	—		—		—		35	3
Udinese	2011–12	Serie A	21	3	—		0	0	—		7 (Note: Two appearances in UEFA Champions League, five appearances in UEFA Europa League)	0	—		28	3
Udinese	Total		127	6	—		4	1	—		17	0	—		148	7
Juventus	2012–13	Serie A	11	0	—		4	0	—		5 (Note: Appearances in UEFA Champions League)	0	—		20	0
Juventus	2013–14	Serie A	18	0	—		0	0	—		8 (Note: Two appearances in UEFA Champions League, six appearances in UEFA Europa League)	0	0	0	26	0
Juventus	2015–16	Serie A	1	0	—		0	0	—		0	0	0	0	1	0
Juventus	Total		30	0	—		4	0	—		13	0	—		47	0
Queens Park Rangers (loan)	2014–15	Premier League	26	0	—		1	0	—		—		—		27	0
Marseille (loan)	2015–16	Ligue 1	23	2	—		5	0	2	0	8	0	—		38	2
Cagliari	2016–17	Serie A	34	1	—		1	0	—		—		—		35	1
Fenerbahçe	2017–18	Süper Lig	21	0	—		4	0	—		4	0	—		29	0
Fenerbahçe	2018–19	Süper Lig	28	0	—		1	0	—		8 (Note: Two appearances in UEFA Champions League, six appearances in UEFA Europa League)	0	—		37	0
Fenerbahçe	2019–20	Süper Lig	19	0	—		6	0	—		—		—		25	0
Fenerbahçe	Total		68	0	—		11	0	—		12	0	—		91	0
Flamengo	2020	Série A	29	2	—		2	0	—		3 (Note: Appearances in Copa Libertadores)	0	—		34	2
Flamengo	2021	Série A	15	0	5	0	4	0	—		11	0	1 (Note: Appearance in Supercopa do Brasil)	0	36	0
Flamengo	2022	Série A	6	1	4	0	0	0	—		3	1	0	0	13	2
Flamengo	Total		50	3	9	0	6	0	—		17	1	1	0	83	4
Universidad Católica	2022	Chilean Primera División	12	0	—		5	0	—		1 (Note: Appearance(s) in Copa Sudamericana)	0	—		18	0
Universidad Católica	2023	Chilean Primera División	10	1	—		1	0	—		1	0	—		12	1
Universidad Católica	Total		22	1	—		6	0	—		2	0	—		30	1
Independiente	2023	Argentine Primera División	12	1	—		2	0	—		—		—		14	1
Independiente	2024	Argentine Primera División	17	1	—		1	0	—		—		—		18	1
Independiente	Total		29	2	—		3	0	—		—		—		32	2
Colo-Colo	2024	Chilean Primera División	10	0	—		1	0	—		4	0	—		15	0
Colo-Colo	2025	Chilean Primera División	12	0	—		4	0	—		6	1	—		22	1
Colo-Colo	Total		22	0	—		5	0	—		10	1	—		37	1
Career total			431	15	9	0	46	1	2	0	79	1	1	0	568	18

=== International ===
As of match played 8 February 2025

Appearances and goals by national team and year
National team	Year	Apps	Goals
Chile	2007	1	0
Chile	2008	2	0
Chile	2009	7	0
Chile	2010	8	1
Chile	2011	13	1
Chile	2012	3	0
Chile	2013	10	0
Chile	2014	13	0
Chile	2015	14	1
Chile	2016	14	0
Chile	2017	14	1
Chile	2018	6	0
Chile	2019	10	0
Chile	2020	3	0
Chile	2021	14	1
Chile	2022	4	0
Chile	2024	8	0
Chile	2025	1	0
Total		145	5

Chile's score listed first, score column indicates score after each Isla goal.

International goals by date, venue, cap, opponent, score, result and competition
No.	Date	Venue	Cap	Opponent	Score	Result	Competition	Ref.
1	7 September 2010	Dynamo Stadium, Kyiv, Ukraine	17	Ukraine	1–2	1–2	Friendly	
2	2 September 2011	AFG Arena, St. Gallen, Switzerland	26	Spain	1–0	2–3	Friendly	
3	25 June 2015	Estadio Nacional, Santiago, Chile	64	Uruguay	1–0	1–0	2015 Copa América	
4	9 June 2017	VEB Arena, Moscow, Russia	89	Russia	1–0	1–1	Friendly	
5	11 October 2021	Estadio San Carlos de Apoquindo, Santiago, Chile	130	Paraguay	2–0	2–0	2022 FIFA World Cup qualification	

== Honours ==
Juventus

- Serie A: 2012–13, 2013–14
- Supercoppa Italiana: 2013, 2015

Flamengo

- Campeonato Brasileiro Série A: 2020
- Supercopa do Brasil: 2021
- Campeonato Carioca: 2021
- Copa Libertadores de América: 2022

Colo-Colo

- Liga de Primera: 2024
- Supercopa de Chile: 2024

Chile

- Copa América: 2015, 2016

Individual

- Copa América Team of the Tournament: 2016, 2021
- Bola de Prata: 2020
- IFFHS Men's CONMEBOL Team: 2021

== See also ==
- List of footballers with 100 or more caps
