= Raffaele Ioime =

Italian footballer

Personal information
- Date of birth: 27 October 1987 (age 39)
- Place of birth: Naples, Italy
- Height: 1.90 m (6 ft 3 in)
- Position: Goalkeeper

Youth career
- –2008: Catania

Senior career*
Years	Team	Apps	(Gls)
2004–2010	Catania	0	(0)
2005–2006	→ Savoia (loan)	29	(0)
2006–2007	→ Brindisi (loan)	15	(0)
2007	→ Cosenza (loan)	15	(0)
2008–2009	→ Legnano (loan)	21	(0)
2009–2010	SPAL	0	(0)
2010–2011	UTA Arad	6	(0)
2012	Campobasso	14	(0)
2012–2013	Latina	4	(0)
2015	Ischia	7	(0)
2016	Gaeta		
2016–2018	Picerno	72	(0)
2018	Matera	1	(0)
2018–2020	Potenza	50	(0)
2020–2021	Triestina	0	(0)
- * Club domestic league appearances and goals as of 31 May 2021

Raffaele Ioime (born 27 October 1987) is an Italian association football goalkeeper.

== Club career ==
=== Early career ===
Ioime initially began his youth career with Sicilian side Calcio Catania at a very young age, before spending parts of his youth career on loan with clubs such as Savoia, Brindisi, and Cosenza, where he earned starting positions at each of the three then-Serie D based clubs. He spent the entire 2005-06 Serie D season with Savoia, making 29 league appearances. He was then loaned out to Brindisi ahead of the 2006-07 season and was the club's starting goalkeeper. He made 15 league appearances before returning to Catania in January 2007. His stay was only temporary though, as he was then loaned out to fellow Serie D outfit, Cosenza, where he also made 15 league appearances as the club's starting goalkeeper. He returned to Catania again on 30 June 2007.

=== Calcio Catania ===
Ioime joined the 'Primavera youth squad of Calcio Catania at the age of 19 in 2007, and he was promoted into the senior squad in 2008, however, without making any appearance with the first team. He was successively sent out on loan to Lega Pro Prima Divisione side A.C. Legnano in July 2008 in order to gain some first team experience and he made a total of 21 appearances for the Lombardi club. On 30 June 2009, he returned to Calcio Catania but was one of seven goalkeepers on the books with the Etnei. Albano Bizzarri and Ciro Polito were sold, while Paolo Acerbis returned to U.S. Grosseto F.C. following his loan spell. Ioime was sent out in co-ownership to SPAL in July 2009, in order to play regularly. At SPAL he joined fellow Catania loanee Milan Bortel. During the 2009–2010 season, Ioime served as a reserve keeper to veteran Luca Capecchi.

=== FC UTA Arad ===
In June 2010, the player's joint-ownership deal between SPAL 1907 and Calcio Catania was renewed, however he was later sold to Romanian Liga II side FC UTA Arad. He has served as the club's starting goalkeeper on 6 occasions in the league. At the conclusion of the 2010-11 season, Ioime was released.

=== Campobasso Calcio ===
Following his adventure in Romania, Ioime returned to Italy following the 2010-11 season. He remained unattached for the first part of the season before being signed on a free transfer by Lega Pro Seconda Divisione side Campobasso Calcio in January 2012. He won a starting position at the club and would feature in 14 league appearances during the second half of the 2011-12 Lega Pro.

=== Latina Calcio ===
In June 2012, Ioime has been acquired by U.S. Latina Calcio. During 2012–13 season, he served as backup to starting goalkeeper Giacomo Bindi, collecting 4 caps. U.S. Latina Calcio reached 3rd position in the tournament and moved to Serie B after winning the playoff finals. He was indeed chosen as starting goalkeeper for Lega Pro Coppa Italia trophy, which was won by his team.

=== Esperia Viareggio ===
On 7 July 2014, he joined Serie C side Viareggio.

=== Matera / Potenza ===
He signed with the Serie C club Matera Calcio on 4 August 2018, but just two weeks later, on 17 August 2018, he moved again, this time to Potenza.

=== Triestina ===
On 19 August 2020 he joined Triestina on a 2-year contract.
