= List of transfers of the Primera División Paraguaya 2009 =

Following is a list of transfers of the 2009 Paraguayan Primera División season. The División Profesional de la Asociación Paraguaya de Fútbol (English: Professional Division of the Paraguayan Football Association), also known as the Primera División (English: First Division), or due to sponsorship reasons Copa TIGO, is the top-flight professional football league in Paraguay. There are 12 teams in the first division.

== Cerro Porteño ==
In:

- Jorge Daniel Núñez from Club Nacional (Paraguay)
- (Paraguay) Ivan Gonzalez Ferreira from (Paraguay) Sol de America
- (Paraguay) Julio Dos Santos from (Brazil) Atletico Paranaense
- (Paraguay) Jaison Ibarrola from (Chile) Universidad Católica
- (Paraguay) Carlos Recalde from (Argentina) Argentinos Juniors
- (Argentina) Roberto Nanni from (Argentina) Vélez Sársfield

Out:

- (Argentina) Germán Castillo from (Argentina) Gimnasia y Esgrima de Jujuy
- (Argentina) Alcides Piccoli to (Argentina) Gimnasia y Esgrima de Jujuy
- (Paraguay) Roberto Junior Fernandez to (Argentina) Estudiantes de la Plata
- (Paraguay) Jonni Cabrera to (Italy) Udinese
- (Paraguay) Walter Fretes to (Paraguay) Sportivo Luqueño
- (Paraguay) Carlos Villagra to (Paraguay) Sportivo Luqueño
- Alfredo Rojas to Club Nacional (Paraguay)

== Olimpia ==
In:

- (Paraguay) Claudio Vargas & (Paraguay) Daniel Ferreira from (Paraguay) Sportivo Luqueño
- (Paraguay) Carlos Bonet from (Mexico) Cruz Azul
- (Paraguay) Nelson Romero from (Paraguay) Club Libertad
- (Paraguay) Pablo Giménez from (Mexico) Querétaro FC
- (Paraguay) Nelson Cuevas from Universidad de Chile

Out:

- (Paraguay) Denis Caniza out to (Paraguay) Club Nacional
