= Jonni Cabrera =

Paraguayan footballer (born 1989)

Personal information
- Date of birth: June 14, 1989 (age 37)
- Position: Defender

Youth career
- Cerro Porteño
- 2009-2010: Udinese

Senior career*
Years	Team	Apps	(Gls)
2010	Granada		
2011	Sportivo Luqueño		
2012-2013	Deportivo Mandiyú		
2013	Club Sol de América		

International career
2009	Paraguay U-20 MNT		
- * Club domestic league appearances and goals

Jonni Cabrera (born 14 June 1989) is a Paraguayan association footballer.

== Career ==
In 2009, he represented Paraguay U20 at the 2009 South American U-20 Championship in Venezuela.

He was transferred from Cerro Porteño to the Youth Academy of Udinese on 24 July 2009.

He was issued the number #35 for the 2009–10 Serie A season and was present at the club at the same time as Alexis Sánchez however he did not manage to make a first-team appearance.

On 30 August 2010, he was loaned to Spain's Granada.

On 14 August 2011, he was loaned to Sportivo Luqueño.

He played for Deportivo Mandiyú in the Copa Argentina in 2012.

== See also ==
- 2009 South American Youth Championship squads
- List of transfers of the Primera División Paraguaya 2009
- List of Italian football transfers summer 2009 (July)
- List of Italian football transfers summer 2010 (August)
- List of Italian football transfers summer 2011 (August)
- 2009–10 Udinese Calcio season
