= Catherine of Cilli =

Catherine of Cilli (Slovene: Katarina Celjska) is a female noble name may refer to:

- Catherine of Bosnia, Countess of Cilli (c. 1336 – c. 1396), wife of Herman I
- Katarina Branković (1418–1492/1419–c. 1490), countess of Cilli

== See also ==
- Cilli (disambiguation)
