= 2009 in Paraguayan football =

The 2009 season is the 99th season of competitive football in Paraguay.

== Primera División ==
- Apertura champion: Cerro Porteño (28th title).
  - Top scorer: Pablo Velázquez (16 goals).
- Clausura champion: Nacional (7th title).
  - Top scorer: Cesar Caceres Cañete (11 goals).

Source: RSSSF

== Transfers ==
- List of transfers during the 2009 season registered under the Asociación Paraguaya de Fútbol.

== Paraguay national team ==
The following table lists all the games played by the Paraguay national football team in official competitions during 2009.

Date	Venue	Opponents	Score	Comp	Paraguay scorers	Report
February 11, 2009	Estadio Alejandro Villanueva; Lima, Peru	Peru	0 - 1	F	C. Riveros 19'	N/A
March 28, 2009	Estadio Centenario; Montevideo, Uruguay	Uruguay	2 – 0	WCQ2010		Report
April 1, 2009	Estadio Olímpico Atahualpa; Quito, Ecuador	Ecuador	1 – 1	WCQ2010	Benítez 90+2'	Report
June 6, 2009	Estadio Defensores del Chaco; Asunción, Paraguay	Chile	0 – 2	WCQ2010		Report
June 10, 2009	Estádio do Arruda; Recife, Brazil	Brazil	2 – 1	WCQ2010	Cabañas 25'	Report
August 12, 2009	Seoul World Cup Stadium; Seoul, South Korea	South Korea	1 - 0	F		Report
September 5, 2009	Estadio Defensores del Chaco; Asunción, Paraguay	Bolivia	1 – 0	WCQ2010	Cabañas 45+1' (pen.)	Report
September 9, 2009	Estadio Defensores del Chaco; Asunción, Paraguay	Argentina	1 – 0	WCQ2010	Valdez 27'	Report
October 10, 2009	Polideportivo Cachamay; Puerto Ordaz, Venezuela	Venezuela	1 – 2	WCQ2010	Cabañas 55'; Cardozo 79'	Report
October 14, 2009	Estadio Defensores del Chaco; Asunción, Paraguay	Colombia	2 – 0	WCQ2010		Report
November 4, 2009	Estadio CAP; Talcahuano, Chile	Chile	1 – 2	F	Cabral 69'	Report
November 13, 2009	Stade Robert Diochon; Rouen, France	Qatar	0 – 2	F		Report
November 18, 2009	Philips Stadion; Eindhoven, Netherlands	Netherlands	0 – 0	F		Report

KEY: F = Friendly match; WCQ2010 = 2010 FIFA World Cup qualification
