= Riccardo Durandi =

Italian footballer

Personal information
- Date of birth: 6 January 1990 (age 36)
- Place of birth: Manzano, Italy
- Height: 1.90 m (6 ft 3 in)
- Position: Goalkeeper

Youth career
- Donatello
- 2004–2005: → Triestina (loan)
- 2005–2006: Chiavris
- 2006–2007: Udinese
- 2007–2008?: Chiavris
- 2008–2009: Ascoli
- 2009–2010: Triestina

Senior career*
Years	Team	Apps	(Gls)
2009–2011	Triestina	1	(0)
2010–2011	→ Lecco (loan)	22	(0)
2011–2012	Lecco	11	(0)
2012–2013	San Daniele del Friuli		
2014–2015	Blessanese	1	(0)
- * Club domestic league appearances and goals

Riccardo Durandi (born 6 January 1990) is an Italian footballer who played in Serie B for Triestina.

== Biography ==
=== Youth career ===
Born in Manzano, the Province of Udine, Friuli-Venezia Giulia region, Durandi spent his early career inside the region. In 2004, he left for Triestina, located in the historical capital of Venezia Giulia region. He then returned to Udine, capital of Friuli, for Chiavris. In 2006, he was signed by the major club of the city: Udinese Calcio. He played for Udinese's Berretti team.

In 2008, he left for Marche club Ascoli for its "Spring" under-20 team., but the deal made official on 12 January 2009. He made his first appearance in the "spring" league on 17 January as unused bench. He only played twice that season, out of possible 13 games.

In 2009, he was re-signed by Triestina, wore no.90 shirt. He remained as a member of the spring in 2009–10 season.

=== Triestina and Lecco ===
Durandi made his league debut on 28 November 2009, replacing Michael Agazzi in the last minutes. He remain as an understudy of Alex Calderoni after the departure of Agazzi, but usually David Dei occupied the bench and Durandi remained in youth team.

In August 2010 he was loaned to Lecco from Triestina, co-currently with the signing of Sergio Viotti. He was the starting keeper of the team, played 22 out of 32 games.

At the end of season he returned to Trieste, and was the backup of Viotti in 2011–12 Coppa Italia. But on 31 August signed outright by Lecco. In exchange, Fabio Gadignani joined Triestina on loan. Durandi remained as the starting keeper of the team for the first 8 game. However, after the team collected the least point (4 points) in 8 games, new coach Maurizio Pellegrino chose Filippo Perucchini as new starting keeper. In round 11 the coach used Giuseppe Aprea as new first choice.

=== Representative teams ===
Durandi received call-up from Friuli-Venezia Giulia Allievi representative team for training camp before the start of Coppa Nazionale Primavera, a nation-wise competition between the regions in 2006. He did not enter the final squad. He returned to the representative teams in 2011, for a training camp of Italy U21 Serie C team. During the camp he also played an internal friendly as Green team keeper, against Red team.
