= Kris Thackray =

English footballer (born 1988)

Personal information
- Date of birth: 27 April 1988 (age 38)
- Place of birth: Newcastle Upon Tyne, England
- Height: 1.93 m (6 ft 4 in)
- Position: Centre back

Youth career
- 1997–2004: Newcastle United
- 2006–2008: Reggina

Senior career*
Years	Team	Apps	(Gls)
2008–2011	Reggina	0	(0)
2008–2009	→ Monopoli (loan)	27	(0)
2009–2010	→ Ancona (loan)	10	(0)
2010–2011	Fidelis Andria	10	(0)
2010–2011	→ Cosenza (loan)	12	(1)
2012–2013	Qormi	43	(5)
2013–2015	Alemannia Aachen	24	(1)
2015–2017	KFC Uerdingen 05	46	(2)
2018	Gżira United	8	(0)
2018–2019	Spennymoor Town	24	(0)
2019–2020	Morpeth Town	12	(0)
2019–2020	→ Blyth Spartans (loan)	6	(2)
2020–2021	Blyth Spartans	14	(2)
Total		236	(13)
- * Club domestic league appearances and goals

Kris Thackray (born 27 April 1988) is an English former professional footballer who played as a centre-back.

== Career ==
Thackray started his career with Newcastle United, but was released at the age of 16. He signed for the then Italian Serie A side Reggina, after being spotted playing in tournament for England Colleges XI. He spent his first professional season on loan with Lega Pro Seconda Divisione club Monopoli, where he was awarded Monopoli's Player of the Season. He played on loan to Reggina's fellow Serie B side, Ancona He played ten games at Ancona.

In July 2010 he was sold to Lega Pro Prima Divisione club Fidelis Andria in a co-ownership bid. Later in January 2011 he was loaned to Cosenza, another club from Lega Pro Prima Divisione. He scored his first professional goal for Cosenza against Pisa on 13 February.

In July 2011 he ended his contract with Reggina for the chance to return home to England. After trialing with Huddersfield Town, Wrexham and Gateshead Thackray received an offer from Maltese Premier League side Qormi and signed in January 2012. After leaving Qormi, Thackray went on to play in Germany for Alemannia Aachen and KFC Uerdingen before returning to Malta to sign for Gżira United.

Thackray played for Spennymoor Town in the 2018–19 season. He left the club at the end of the season and joined Morpeth Town in June 2019. Thackray then joined Blyth Spartans on a one-month loan on 13 December 2019 after an injury, before signing permanently with The Spartans at the end of the loan spell in January 2020.
