= Antonio Infimo =

Italian footballer (born 1990)

Personal information
- Date of birth: February 12, 1990 (age 36)
- Place of birth: Naples, Italy
- Position: Striker

Team information
- Current team: Igea Virtus

Youth career
- Bari

Senior career*
Years	Team	Apps	(Gls)
2008–	Bari	1	(0)
2009–	→ Igea Virtus (loan)	9	(0)
- * Club domestic league appearances and goals as of 12:41, 10 May 2010 (UTC)

Antonio Infimo (born February 12, 1990) is an Italian professional football player currently playing for Lega Pro Seconda Divisione team F.C. Igea Virtus Barcellona on loan from A.S. Bari.
