= Mariano Rudi =

Italian footballer

Personal information
- Date of birth: 2 June 1990 (age 36)
- Place of birth: Genoa, Italy
- Height: 1.88 m (6 ft 2 in)
- Position: Midfielder

Team information
- Current team: Savona

Youth career
- Genoa

Senior career*
Years	Team	Apps	(Gls)
2009–2012	Pro Patria	6	(0)
2010	→ Pisa (loan)	0	(0)
2012	Lecco	6	(0)
2012–2013	Sestri Levante	9	(0)
2013–	Savona	0	(0)
- * Club domestic league appearances and goals

Mariano Rudi (born 2 June 1990 in Genoa) is an Italian professional football player currently playing for Pro Patria.

He made his professional debut in the 2009/10 season for the Lega Pro Prima Divisione team Aurora Pro Patria 1919.

In January 2012 he joined Lecco, with Luca Viviani moved to opposite direction.

On 31 August 2013 he joined Savona F.B.C.
