= Andrea Briotti =

Italian footballer (born 1986)

Personal information
- Date of birth: 2 May 1986 (age 40)
- Place of birth: Rome, Italy
- Height: 1.81 m (5 ft 11 1/2 in)
- Position: Defender

Youth career
- Roma

Senior career*
Years	Team	Apps	(Gls)
2004–2006	Roma	1	(0)
2005–2006	→ Napoli (loan)	9	(0)
2006–2009	Sassuolo	0	(0)
2007–2008	→ Scafatese (loan)	9	(0)
2008–2009	→ Carrarese (loan)	17	(0)
2009–2010	Viareggio	21	(0)
2010	Rodengo Saiano	7	(0)
2011	Savona	7	(1)
2011–2016	Astrea	122	(3)

International career
2002	Italy U16	3	(1)
2002	Italy U17	5	(0)
2004	Italy U19	1	(0)
- * Club domestic league appearances and goals

Andrea Briotti (born 2 May 1986) is an Italian retired footballer.

== Biography ==
A native of Rome, Briotti started his career at AS Roma and received Italian youth teams call-up there. He played his only match at Serie A in April 2005, substituted Giuseppe Scurto in the 88 minute. The match ended in a 3–3 draw.

In August 2005, he was loaned to Napoli at Serie C1. He played for the Champion 9 times. In the next season he joined Sassuolo in a co-ownership deal. He failed to make any appearances and left for Scafatese and Carrarese of Serie C2 on loan.

On 2 July 2009, the club announced Briotti and teammate Michael Brini Ferri left for Viareggio permanently.

In 2010, he left for Rodengo Saiano and in January 2011 signed by Savona. From 2011 to 2016 he played for ASD Astrea, in the fourth and fifth divisions.

== Honours ==
Napoli

- Serie C1: 2006
