= Michael Brini Ferri =

Italian footballer

Personal information
- Date of birth: 18 July 1989 (age 37)
- Place of birth: Ferrara, Italy
- Position: Midfielder

Team information
- Current team: Viareggio

Youth career
- Sassuolo

Senior career*
Years	Team	Apps	(Gls)
2009–2011	Viareggio	9	(0)
2011	Camaiore	10	(0)
2011–	Viareggio	0	(0)
- * Club domestic league appearances and goals

Michael Brini Ferri (born 18 July 1989) is an Italian footballer who plays for Viareggio.

== Biography ==
Born in Ferrara, Emilia–Romagna, Brini Ferri started his career at Sassuolo. In 2009, he left for Viareggio in co-ownership deal along with Andrea Briotti. In June 2010, Sassuolo gave up the remain 50% registration rights to Viareggio. After no appearance in the first half of 2010–11 Lega Pro Prima Divisione, Brini Ferri joined Serie D (non-professional/regional) team Camaiore on a free transfer. On 23 June he returned to Viareggio.
