= Flavio Lazzari =

Italian footballer (born 1986)

Personal information
- Date of birth: 5 September 1986 (age 40)
- Place of birth: Rome, Italy
- Height: 1.86 m (6 ft 1 in)
- Position: Midfielder

Team information
- Current team: Atletico Gallo Colbordolo

Senior career*
Years	Team	Apps	(Gls)
2004–2006	Cisco Lodigiani	21	(2)
2005–2006	→ Udinese (loan)	2	(0)
2006–2010	Udinese	0	(0)
2006–2007	→ Modena (loan)	9	(0)
2007–2008	→ Messina (loan)	29	(1)
2008–2009	→ Grosseto (loan)	26	(1)
2009–2010	→ Padova (loan)	10	(0)
2010	→ Gallipoli (loan)	13	(1)
2010–2012	Empoli	47	(6)
2012–2016	Novara	72	(10)
2014–2015	→ Pescara (loan)	12	(1)
2016–2017	Ascoli	11	(0)
2017–2018	Fondi	23	(4)
2018–2021	Vis Pesaro	53	(11)
2021–	Atletico Gallo Colbordolo		

International career^{‡}
2003	Italy U17	2	(0)
2004–2005	Italy U19	2	(0)
2005–2006	Italy U20	3	(0)
- * Club domestic league appearances and goals as of 2 May 2021 ‡ National team caps and goals as of 29 November 2010

Flavio Lazzari (born 5 September 1986) is an Italian former footballer who played for Atletico Gallo Colbordolo as a midfielder.

== Career ==
Lazzari started his career at Cisco Roma (known as Cisco Lodigiani in the 2004–05 season), Rome's third football team.

=== Udinese ===
He was then signed by Udinese in summer 2005, and made his Serie A debut on 11 December 2005 against Lecce.

He signed a permanent deal in summer 2006, but he then farmed to Serie B clubs Modena and Messina. He spent the 2008–09 season on loan to Grosseto.

=== Empoli ===
On 31 August 2010, Udinese signed Gabriele Angella along with Diego Fabbrini in co-ownership deal for €3 million. As part of the deal, Ricardo Chará and Lazzari joined Empoli, also in a co-ownership deal for a peppercorn.

He made his club debut on 5 September 2010, replacing injured Riccardo Nardini in the first half. That match Empoli 0–0 draw with Varese. He made his first start in the next match, replacing the absent Nardini. He then replaced regular starter Fabbrini who had international duty, as left midfielder (442 formation), (451/4321 formation) and as the sole attacking midfielder (4312 formation), which he was replaced by Fabbrini in second half. He then lost his starting place and had to compete with Salvatore Foti for one of the starting place in attacking midfielders since round 9, which the coach sometimes used one more attacking midfielder (4231 formation) to partner with Fabbrini and Nardini.

In summer 2012, Udinese gave up the remain 50% registration rights of Lazzari to Empoli for free.

=== Novara ===
On 31 August 2012, he was swapped with Guillaume Gigliotti in a cashless deal. However, both players were tagged for €1.5 million. He signed a three-year contract. On 24 September 2013, Lazzari signed a new four-year contract.

On 30 July 2014 he was signed by Pescara in a temporary deal.
