= Daniele Cilli =

Italian footballer (born 1988)

Personal information
- Date of birth: 19 March 1988 (age 38)
- Place of birth: Barletta, Italy
- Height: 1.86 m (6 ft 1 in)
- Position: Goalkeeper

Team information
- Current team: Igea Virtus

Youth career
- Bari

Senior career*
Years	Team	Apps	(Gls)
2006–	Bari	0	(0)
2007–2009	→ Noicattaro (loan)	7	(0)
2009–	→ Igea Virtus (loan)	13	(0)
- * Club domestic league appearances and goals as of 17:55, 7 May 2010 (UTC)

Daniele Cilli (born 19 March 1988) is an Italian professional football player currently playing for Lega Pro Seconda Divisione team F.C. Igea Virtus Barcellona on loan from A.S. Bari.
