= Rafael Romo =

Venezuelan footballer (born 1990)

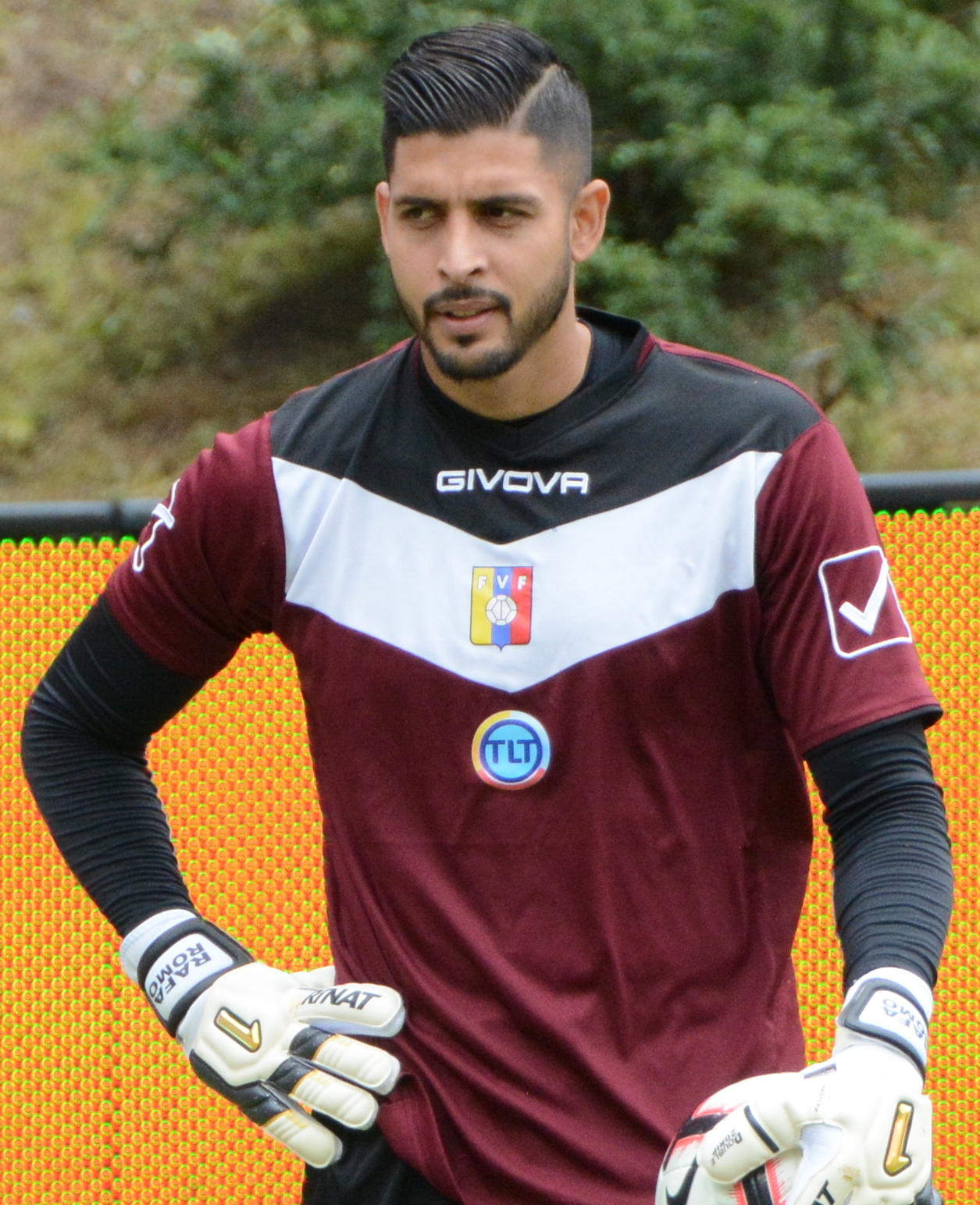
- Romo with Venezuela in 2019

Personal information
- Full name: Rafael Enrique Romo Pérez
- Date of birth: February 25, 1990 (age 36)
- Place of birth: Turén, Venezuela
- Height: 1.96 m (6 ft 5 in)
- Position: Goalkeeper

Team information
- Current team: UCV

Youth career
- 2005–2007: Atlético de Turén

Senior career*
Years	Team	Apps	(Gls)
2007–2009	Llaneros	27	(0)
2009–2016	Udinese	1	(0)
2010–2011	→ Estudiantes Mérida (loan)	14	(0)
2012–2015	→ Mineros (loan)	78	(0)
2015	→ Watford (loan)	0	(0)
2016–2017	AEL Limassol	34	(0)
2017–2019	APOEL	12	(0)
2017–2018	→ Beerschot Wilrijk (loan)	40	(0)
2019–2020	Silkeborg IF	23	(0)
2020–2022	OH Leuven	46	(0)
2022	D.C. United	14	(0)
2023–2026	Universidad Católica	88	(0)
2026–	UCV	1	(0)

International career^{‡}
2008–2009	Venezuela U20	4	(0)
2008–	Venezuela	36	(0)
- * Club domestic league appearances and goals as of 31 August 2025 ‡ National team caps and goals as of 23:15, 9 September 2025 (UTC)

Rafael Enrique Romo Pérez (born February 25, 1990) is a Venezuelan professional footballer who plays as a goalkeeper for UCV and the Venezuela national team.

== Career ==
Romo started his career at 17 years old, playing in old Venezuelan goalkeeper Gilberto Angelucci's team, the Atlético de Turén. He participated in the 2007 Venezuelan Torneo Apertura. He played against U.A. Maracaibo in the Copa Venezuela, which surprised fans and the press. On 15 July 2009, Udinese acquired the goalkeeper from Llaneros de Guanare.

Romo made his debut with Udinese in a 3–1 defeat against Lazio, on 15 May 2010.

After three years on loan at Mineros, Romo signed for Watford in August 2015 on a short-term loan deal to cover the two game suspension for Giedrius Arlauskis.

On 1 September 2019, Romo joined Danish Superliga club Silkeborg IF on a contract until June 2020. He departed the club following the expiry of his contract.

On 27 April 2022, Romo signed with MLS side, D.C. United, on a one-and-a-half-year contract through 2023 with an option for 2024.

== Career statistics ==
=== International ===
As of match played 9 September 2025

Appearances and goals by national team and year
National team	Year	Apps	Goals
Venezuela	2008	1	0
Venezuela	2009	4	0
Venezuela	2011	3	0
Venezuela	2018	2	0
Venezuela	2019	2	0
Venezuela	2021	1	0
Venezuela	2023	7	0
Venezuela	2024	10	0
Venezuela	2025	6	0
Total		36	0
