= Milan Bortel =

Slovak footballer

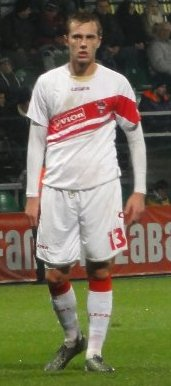

Personal information
- Full name: Milan Bortel
- Date of birth: 7 April 1987 (age 39)
- Place of birth: Ilava, Czechoslovakia
- Height: 1.88 m (6 ft 2 in)
- Position: Centre back

Team information
- Current team: SC Mannswörth
- Number: 13

Youth career
- 1998–2005: Dubnica

Senior career*
Years	Team	Apps	(Gls)
2005–2006	Manduria Calcio	28	(0)
2006–2009	Manfredonia	50	(0)
2009	Catania	0	(0)
2009–2011	SPAL	38	(0)
2012	Sereď	13	(2)
2012	Zlaté Moravce	15	(0)
2013–2014	Slavia Prague	20	(0)
2014–2016	Spartak Trnava	35	(1)
2016–2017	SV Horn	34	(2)
2017–2018	SV Wimpassing		
2018–2019	FCM Traiskirchen	24	(1)
2019–2020	BSC Bruck/Leitha	8	(0)
2020–2021	SC Mannswörth	1	(0)
2021–2022	Sportfreunde Berg		
2022–	SV Gols		
- * Club domestic league appearances and goals as of 16:41, 7 January 2023 (UTC)

Milan Bortel (born 7 April 1987) is a Slovak footballer who plays as a centre back for Austrian club SV Gols.

== Club career ==
Bortel started his professional career as a central defender for the youth team of Dubnica in 1998, and remained at the club until 2005, when he transferred to Italian Serie D club, Manduria Calcio. In his first season, he managed 28 appearances. Following several impressive displays, he joined Serie C1 side Manfredonia in 2006. Bortel became a key figure to their defence line.

In January 2009, FIFA Dispute Resolution Chamber rejected Bortel's youth club's Dubnica claim for training compensation from Manfredonia, following several disagreements regarding the transfer.

On 25 June 2009, he was officially signed by Calcio Catania on a four-year contract. Shortly, he was sent back to the Lega Pro Prima Divisione with SPAL in co-ownership deal. In his first season with the club, Bortel made 21 league appearances, and in the summer of 2010, SPAL signed the Slovak defender permanently from Catania. He remained at SPAL for the 2010–11 Lega Pro season, before transferring to Sereď in his native country in March 2012. At the end of the 2011–12 season, Bortel was transferred to Zlaté Moravce.

In January 2013, he moved to Slavia Prague.

He was transferred to Spartak Trnava in June 2014. He made his league debut for them against his former side, Zlaté Moravce, on 13 July 2014.
