= Andrea Milani (footballer, born 1919) =

Italian footballer

Personal information
- Date of birth: 13 December 1919
- Place of birth: San Michele Extra, Kingdom of Italy
- Position: Midfielder

Senior career*
Years	Team	Apps	(Gls)
1938–1941	Audace S. Michele Extra		
1941–1947	Inter Milan	99	(0)
1947–1950	Palermo	80	(4)
1950–1952	Brescia	54	(3)
1952–1954	Verona	48	(6)
- * Club domestic league appearances and goals

Andrea Milani (born 13 December 1919) was an Italian professional footballer.
