= Ricardo Chará =

Colombian footballer (born 1990)

Personal information
- Full name: Ricardo Chará Lerma
- Date of birth: 24 May 1990 (age 36)
- Place of birth: Cali, Colombia
- Height: 1.88 m (6 ft 2 in)
- Position: Defender

Youth career
- 2007: Boca Juniors de Cali

Senior career*
Years	Team	Apps	(Gls)
2007–2008	Centauros Villavicencio		
2008–2013	Udinese	0	(0)
2010–2012	→ Empoli (on loan)	2	(0)
Total		2	(0)

International career
2005	Colombia U15	4+	(2)
2007	Colombia U17	12+	(1)
2009	Colombia U20	2+	(1)
- * Club domestic league appearances and goals

Ricardo Chará Lerma (born 24 May 1990) is a Colombian former professional footballer who played as a defender.

== Club career ==
=== Early career ===
Chara started his youth career with his hometown club Cali. He then made his first team debut for Centauros Villavicencio in the Categoría Primera B.

=== Udinese ===
In summer 2008, he was signed by Deportes Quindío. He then scouted by Udinese. As the club run out of non-EU registration quota, as signed Alexis and Odion Ighalo. Along with new signing Dušan Basta, they were signed by another Italian club, then re-signed them in order to borrow the quota.

Chara left for Cagliari on a 1-year loan from Quindío on 1 September 2008. In January 2009, Chara left "on loan" from Cagliari to Udinese and played at Udinese Primavera under-20 team. In summer 2009, along with Basta, they were signed permanently.

On 14 January 2010, he played his first match for Udinese. He substituted Simone Pepe in the 87th minute, on a Coppa Italia Round of 16 match. The match Udinese won Lumezzane of Italian Lega Pro Prima Divisione (third division) 2–0.

On 31 August 2010, Udinese signed Gabriele Angella along with Diego Fabbrini in co-ownership deal for €3 million. As part of the deal, Chará and Flavio Lazzari joined Empoli, also in co-ownership deal for a peppercorn in three-year contract.

In June 2012 Udinese reacquired Chará.

== International career ==
At youth level, Chará has been capped for Colombia at the 2005 South American Under-15 Football Championship (four games, one brace), at the 2007 South American Under-17 Football Championship (eight games, one goal), at the 2007 FIFA U-17 World Cup (four games), and at the 2009 South American Youth Championship (two games, one goal).
