= Andrea Milani (footballer, born 1980) =

Italian footballer and manager

Personal information
- Date of birth: December 9, 1980 (age 45)
- Place of birth: Latina, Italy
- Height: 1.66 m (5 ft 5 1/2 in)
- Position: Right back

Team information
- Current team: Catanzaro (assistant)

Senior career*
Years	Team	Apps	(Gls)
1997–1998	Lazio	0	(0)
1998–1999	Pro Cisterna	32	(0)
1999–2001	Ceccano	62	(7)
2001–2002	Campobasso	21	(0)
2002–2003	Mestre	28	(0)
2003–2005	Cittadella	65	(1)
2006	Brescia	8	(0)
2006–2007	Bari	33	(0)
2007–2009	Triestina	50	(2)
2009–2010	Ancona	36	(0)
2010–2012	Modena	56	(0)
2012–2016	Latina	70	(0)

Managerial career
- 2016–2017: Latina (technical coach)
- 2017–2018: Empoli (assistant)
- 2018–2019: Ascoli (technical coach)
- 2019–2020: Bari (assistant)
- 2020–2021: Virtus Entella (assistant)
- 2021–: Catanzaro (assistant)
- * Club domestic league appearances and goals

Andrea Milani (born December 9, 1980) is an Italian former footballer who played as a defender and current assistant manager of US Catanzaro 1929. He made 235 appearances in Serie B.

== Coaching career ==
On 13 April 2016, Milani announced his retirement. He was then hired as a technical coach for U.S. Latina Calcio under manager Vincenzo Vivarini. He left alongside Vivarini in June 2017 and then became his assistant at Empoli F.C. less than a month later. In the summer 2018, he followed Vivarini to Ascoli and became his technical coach once again. Vivarini and his team left Ascoli in the summer 2019 and in September 2019, they were hired at S.S.C. Bari, once again with Milani as his assistant coach. In November 2020 he once again took an assistant manager position under Vivarini, signing with Virtus Entella. During the following season, Vivarini and Milani replaced Antonio Calabro and his team at US Catanzaro in Serie C. Catanzaro would narrowly miss out on promotion losing in the playoff series. In 2022–23 however, Catanzaro topped Group C and earned direct promotion into Serie B.
