= 2013–14 AS Livorno Calcio season =

Livorno
2013–14 season
- President: Aldo Spinelli
- Manager: Davide Nicola (until 13 January 2014); Attilio Perotti (from 13 January 2014 to 21 January 2014); Domenico Di Carlo (from 21 January 2014 to 19 April 2014); Davide Nicola (from 20 April 2014)
- Stadium: Armando Picchi
- Serie A: 20th (relegated)
- Coppa Italia: Third round
- Top goalscorer: League: Paulinho (15); All: Paulinho (15)
- Biggest win: 4–1 v Sassuolo (Away, 1 September 2013, Serie A)
- Biggest defeat: 0–4 v Napoli (Away, 6 October 2013, Serie A)
Home colours	Away colours	Third colours

The 2013–14 season was Associazione Sportiva Livorno Calcio's 82nd season in existence as a football club and first season in the Serie A after winning the Serie B promotion play-offs in the previous season. In addition to the domestic league, Livorno participated in the Coppa Italia.

Livorno began the 2013–14 season under manager Davide Nicola, but he was dismissed on 13 January 2014 following a 3–0 home defeat to Parma and with the club at the bottom of the league table; technical director Attilio Perotti was appointed as his successor on the same day. Perotti remained in charge for only one match, a 3–0 defeat away to Roma, before stepping down on 21 January 2014 and being replaced by former Livorno player Domenico Di Carlo, a decision taken by club president Aldo Spinelli. Di Carlo remained manager for approximately three months, but after a 3–0 defeat at Milan left Livorno 19th in Serie A and in danger of relegation, he was dismissed on 19 April 2014, with Nicola reappointed on 20 April 2014 in an attempt to preserve the club’s top-flight status for the final four matches of the season.

== Squad ==
Squad at end of season

Note: Flags indicate national team as defined under FIFA eligibility rules; some limited exceptions apply. Players may hold more than one non-FIFA nationality.

No.	Pos.	Nation	Player
1	GK	ITA	Francesco Bardi (on loan from Inter Milan)
2	DF	ITA	Cristiano Piccini (on loan from Fiorentina)
3	DF	ITA	Giuseppe Gemiti
7	DF	ITA	Paolo Castellini
8	MF	ITA	Lorenzo Simonetti
9	FW	BRA	Paulinho
10	MF	ITA	Andrea Luci
11	DF	ALG	Djamel Mesbah (on loan from Parma)
14	MF	COL	Jonny Mosquera (on loan from Envigado)
15	DF	SEN	Ibrahima Mbaye (on loan from Inter Milan)
16	MF	ITA	Daniele Bartolini
17	DF	ITA	Federico Ceccherini
18	FW	ITA	Elia Bruzzi
19	MF	ITA	Leandro Greco
20	FW	SUI	Innocent Emeghara (on loan from Siena)

No.	Pos.	Nation	Player
21	FW	ALG	Ishak Belfodil (on loan from Inter Milan)
22	GK	ITA	Luca Anania
23	DF	BRA	Emerson
24	MF	ITA	Marco Benassi (on loan from Inter Milan)
26	FW	ITA	Luca Siligardi
27	MF	ITA	Marco Biagianti
29	FW	COL	Miguel Borja
32	FW	ITA	Tommaso Biasci
33	DF	ARG	Nahuel Valentini
37	GK	ITA	Gabriele Aldegani (on loan from Nocerina)
41	MF	GHA	Alfred Duncan (on loan from Inter Milan)
77	DF	ITA	Leandro Rinaudo
85	DF	ITA	Andrea Coda (on loan from Udinese)
95	DF	ITA	Andrea Tiritiello
96	GK	ITA	Matteo Cipriani

== Transfers ==
=== Summer window ===
==== In ====
Date	Position	Player	From	Fee	Notes
30 June 2013	GK	(Italy) Alfonso De Lucia	(Italy) Nocerina	Free	Return from loan
30 June 2013	DF	(Italy) Riccardo Regno	(Italy) Gubbio	Free	Return from loan
1 July 2013	GK	(Italy) Matteo Cipriani	(Italy) Sestese	Free	Loan
1 July 2013	DF	(Switzerland) Saulo Decarli	(Switzerland) Chiasso	€750,000	Loan made permanent transfer
9 July 2013	GK	(Italy) Francesco Bardi	(Italy) Inter Milan	Free	Loan
9 July 2013	DF	(Italy) Cristiano Piccini	(Italy) Fiorentina	Free	Loan
9 July 2013	MF	(Italy) Marco Benassi	(Italy) Inter Milan	Free	Loan
24 July 2013	DF	(Argentina) Nahuel Valentini	(Argentina) Rosario Central	Free	
30 July 2013	MF	(Italy) Leandro Greco	(Greece) Olympiacos	€920,000	
3 August 2013	GK	(Italy) Gabriele Aldegani	(Italy) Nocerina	Free	Loan
20 August 2013	MF	(Ghana) Alfred Duncan	(Italy) Inter Milan	€500,000	Loan
20 August 2013	DF	(Senegal) Ibrahima Mbaye	(Italy) Inter Milan	Free	Loan
27 August 2013	FW	(Switzerland) Innocent Emeghara	(Italy) Siena	€1,000,000	Loan
28 August 2013	MF	(Colombia) Jonny Mosquera	(Colombia) Envigado	€250,000	Loan
29 August 2013	MF	(Italy) Marco Biagianti	(Italy) Catania	€400,000	
29 August 2013	MF	(Argentina) Rubén Botta	(Italy) Inter Milan	Free	Loan
30 August 2013	DF	(Italy) Leandro Rinaudo	(Italy) Napoli	Free	
31 August 2013	DF	(Italy) Andrea Coda	(Italy) Udinese	Free	Loan
2 September 2013	GK	(Italy) Luca Anania	(Italy) Padova	Undisclosed	
2 September 2013	FW	(Colombia) Miguel Borja	(Colombia) Cortuluá	€150,000	Loan

==== Out ====
Date	Position	Player	To	Fee	Notes
19 June 2013	FW	(Italy) Antonio Piccolo	(Italy) Virtus Lanciano	€200,000	Co-ownership solved
30 June 2013	GK	(Italy) Vincenzo Fiorillo	(Italy) Sampdoria	Free	Return from loan
30 June 2013	MF	(Greece) Savvas Gentsoglou	(Italy) Sampdoria	Free	Return from loan
30 June 2013	MF	(Italy) Antonio Junior Vacca	(Italy) Benevento	Free	Return from loan
1 July 2013	GK	(Italy) Iacopo Ricciarelli	(Italy) Prato	Free	
1 July 2013	DF	(Italy) Iacopo Galli	(Italy) Pontedera	Undisclosed	
1 July 2013	DF	(Italy) Andrea Gasbarro	(Italy) Pontedera	Free	Loan
11 July 2013	FW	(Italy) Simone Dell'Agnello	(Italy) Südtirol	Free	Loan
11 July 2013	MF	(Italy) Andrea Molinelli	(Italy) Südtirol	€30,000	Co-ownership
12 July 2013	DF	(Italy) Simone Salviato	(Italy) Novara	€400,000	
13 July 2013	FW	(Argentina) Gastón Cellerino	(Chile) Santiago Wanderers	Free	
16 July 2013	FW	(Bulgaria) Andrey Galabinov	(Italy) Avellino	Free	Loan
19 July 2013	DF	(Italy) Antonio Meola	(Italy) Paganese	Free	Loan
22 July 2013	MF	(Italy) Dario Colombi	(Italy) Grosseto	Free	
22 July 2013	FW	(Italy) Bryan Gioè	(Italy) Grosseto	Free	
25 July 2013	MF	(Italy) Mirko Bigazzi	(Portugal) Olhanense	Free	Loan
26 July 2013	MF	(Austria) Jürgen Prutsch	(Italy) Barletta	Free	
27 August 2013	MF	(Italy) Lorenzo Remedi	(Italy) Torres	Free	Loan
2 September 2013	GK	(Italy) Luca Mazzoni	(Italy) Padova	Free	Loan
2 September 2013	DF	(Italy) Alessandro Bernardini	(Italy) Chievo Verona	Free	Loan
2 September 2013	MF	(Italy) Matteo Lignani	(Italy) Varese	Free	
2 September 2013	FW	(Italy) Federico Dionisi	(Portugal) Olhanense	Free	Loan

=== Winter window ===
==== In ====
Date	Position	Player	From	Fee	Notes
22 January 2014	DF	(Italy) Paolo Castellini	(Italy) Sampdoria	Undisclosed	
29 January 2014	DF	(Algeria) Djamel Mesbah	(Italy) Parma	Free	Loan
30 January 2014	DF	(Italy) Antonio Meola	(Italy) Paganese	Free	Loan terminated early
31 January 2014	FW	(Algeria) Ishak Belfodil	(Italy) Inter Milan	€1,000,000	Loan

==== Out ====
Date	Position	Player	To	Fee	Notes
8 January 2014	MF	(Argentina) Rubén Botta	(Italy) Inter Milan	Free	Loan terminated early
9 January 2014	DF	(Switzerland) Saulo Decarli	(Italy) Avellino	Free	Loan
13 January 2014	MF	(Italy) Pasquale Schiattarella	(Italy) Spezia	€1,200,000	
22 January 2014	DF	(Italy) Alessandro Lambrughi	(Italy) Novara	Free	Loan
24 January 2014	MF	(Italy) Luca Belingheri	(Italy) Cesena	Free	Loan
30 January 2014	DF	(Italy) Andrea Gasbarro	(Italy) Pontedera	Undisclosed	
31 January 2014	DF	(Italy) Antonio Meola	(Italy) Crotone	Free	Loan
31 January 2014	DF	(Italy) Riccardo Regno	(Italy) Pontedera	Free	Loan

== Competitions ==
=== Overview ===
Competition	First match	Last match	Starting round	Final position	Record							
Competition	First match	Last match	Starting round	Final position	Pld	W	D	L	GF	GA	GD	Win %
Serie A	25 August 2013	18 May 2014	Matchday 1	20th	38	6	7	25	39	77	−38	15.79
Coppa Italia	17 August 2013	17 August 2013	Third round	Third round	1	0	0	1	0	1	−1	0.00
Total					39	6	7	26	39	78	−39	15.38

Source: Competitions

=== Serie A ===
==== League table ====
Pos	Team	Pld	W	D	L	GF	GA	GD	Pts	Qualification or relegation
16	Chievo	38	10	6	22	34	54	−20	36	
17	Sassuolo	38	9	7	22	43	72	−29	34	
18	Catania (R)	38	8	8	22	34	66	−32	32	Relegation to Serie B
19	Bologna (R)	38	5	14	19	28	58	−30	29	Relegation to Serie B
20	Livorno (R)	38	6	7	25	39	77	−38	25	Relegation to Serie B

Source: Serie A, Soccerway
Rules for classification: 1st points; 2nd head-to-head points; 3rd head-to-head goal difference; 4th goal difference; 5th number of goals scored; 6th public draw.
(Head-to-head record is applied for clubs with the same number of points only once all matches between said clubs have been played)
(R) Relegated

==== Results summary ====
Overall								Home						Away					
Pld	W	D	L	GF	GA	GD	Pts	W	D	L	GF	GA	GD	W	D	L	GF	GA	GD
38	6	7	25	39	77	−38	25	4	5	10	23	33	−10	2	2	15	16	44	−28

Source: Soccerway

==== Results by round ====
Round	1	2	3	4	5	6	7	8	9	10	11	12	13	14	15	16	17	18	19	20	21	22	23	24	25	26	27	28	29	30	31	32	33	34	35	36	37	38
Ground	H	A	H	A	H	A	A	H	A	H	H	A	H	A	H	A	H	A	H	A	H	A	H	A	H	H	A	H	A	A	H	A	H	A	H	A	H	A
Result	L	W	W	D	D	L	L	L	L	D	W	L	L	L	D	L	L	L	L	L	W	D	L	W	L	D	L	W	L	L	D	L	L	L	L	L	L	L
Position	16	7	6	6	7	8	13	14	15	15	14	15	16	18	18	18	19	19	19	19	19	18	18	17	18	18	18	17	18	18	18	18	18	19	19	20	20	20
Points	0	3	6	7	8	8	8	8	8	9	12	12	12	12	13	13	13	13	13	13	16	17	17	20	20	21	21	24	24	24	25	25	25	25	25	25	25	25

Source: Worldfootball
A = Away; H = Home; W = Win; D = Draw; L = Loss

==== Matches ====
25 August 2013 1	Livorno	0–2	Roma	Livorno
20:45 CEST (UTC+2)	Schiattarella (yellow card) 45+1'	Report	Castán (yellow card) 22'; Benatia (yellow card) 62'; De Rossi 65'; Florenzi 67'	Stadium: Armando Picchi; Referee: D. Massa

1 September 2013 2	Sassuolo	1–4	Livorno	Reggio Emilia
20:45 CEST (UTC+2)	Zaza 66'; Rosati (yellow card) 85'	Report	Greco 44', (yellow card) 60'; Rosati 69' (o.g.); Paulinho 75'; Emeghara 86' (pen.)	Stadium: Mapei Stadium; Referee: P. Mazzoleni

15 September 2013 3	Livorno	2–0	Catania	Livorno
15:00 CEST (UTC+2)	Emerson (yellow card) 4'; Schiattarella (yellow card) 40'; Greco (yellow card) 48'; Paulinho 66', 72', (yellow card) 69'	Report	Álvarez (yellow card) 26'; Spolli (yellow card) 33'; Biraghi (yellow card) 63'	Stadium: Armando Picchi; Referee: A. Gervasoni

21 September 2013 4	Genoa	0–0	Livorno	Genoa
20:45 CEST (UTC+2)	Lodi (yellow card) 3'; Manfredini (yellow card) 50'; Gilardino (yellow card) 62'; Stoian (yellow card) 90+1'	Report	Paulinho (yellow card) 38'	Stadium: Luigi Ferraris; Referee: P. Giacomelli

25 September 2013 5	Livorno	1–1	Cagliari	Livorno
20:45 CEST (UTC+2)	Luci 23', (yellow card) 24'; Duncan (yellow card) 28'	Report	Ibarbo (yellow card) 34', (goal) 53'; Dessena (yellow card) 36'; Perico (yellow card) 85'; Rossettini (yellow card) 90'	Stadium: Armando Picchi; Referee: L. Pairetto

29 September 2013 6	Hellas Verona	2–1	Livorno	Verona
15:00 CEST (UTC+2)	Iturbe 40', (yellow card) 88'; Hallfreðsson (yellow card) 45'; Jorginho 74' (pen.), (yellow card) 75'	Report	Rinaudo 45+1', (yellow card) 72'; Schiattarella (yellow card) 72'	Stadium: Marc'Antonio Bentegodi; Referee: D. Tommasi

6 October 2013 7	Napoli	4–0	Livorno	Naples
15:00 CEST (UTC+2)	Pandev 3'; Inler 26'; Callejón 54'; Hamšík 83'	Report	Luci (yellow card) 60'; Rinaudo (yellow card) 90+2'	Stadium: San Paolo; Referee: M. Bergonzi

20 October 2013 8	Livorno	1–2	Sampdoria	Livorno
15:00 CEST (UTC+2)	Duncan (yellow card) 18'; Paulinho (yellow card) 35'; Emerson (yellow card) 62'; Emeghara (yellow card) 73'; Siligardi 90+2'	Report	Éder 19' (pen.); Obiang (yellow card) 41'; Da Costa (yellow card) 90+1'; Pozzi 90+6' (pen.)	Stadium: Armando Picchi; Referee: D. Celi

27 October 2013 9	Bologna	1–0	Livorno	Bologna
15:00 CET (UTC+1)	Crespo 3'; Diamanti (yellow card) 43'; Cristaldo (yellow card) 81'	Report	Piccini (yellow card) 76'; Coda (yellow card) 81'	Stadium: Renato Dall'Ara; Referee: P. Tagliavento

30 October 2013 10	Livorno	3–3	Torino	Livorno
20:45 CET (UTC+1)	Coda (yellow card) 12'; Greco (yellow card) 22', (goal) 33'; Paulinho 25'; Luci (yellow card) 28'; Emeghara (yellow card) 40'; Emerson 62'; Schiattarella (yellow card) 74'; Rinaudo (yellow card) 86'	Report	Immobile 4', (yellow card) 55'; Glik 7', (yellow card) 15'; Cerci (yellow card) 61', (goal) 87' (pen.); Vives (yellow card) 90+1'	Stadium: Armando Picchi; Referee: P. Valeri

3 November 2013 11	Livorno	1–0	Atalanta	Livorno
12:30 CET (UTC+1)	Paulinho 11'; Greco (yellow card) 28'; Coda (yellow card) 45+1'; Rinaudo (yellow card) 79'	Report	Carmona (yellow card) 18' (yellow-red card) 35'; Moralez (yellow card) 56'; Cigarini (yellow card) 77'; Raimondi (yellow card) 88'	Stadium: Armando Picchi; Referee: C. Russo

9 November 2013 12	Inter Milan	2–0	Livorno	Milan
20:45 CET (UTC+1)	Bardi 30' (o.g.); Ranocchia (yellow card) 32'; Samuel (yellow card) 33'; Nagatomo 90+1'; Rolando (yellow card) 90+4'	Report	Duncan (yellow card) 24'; Paulinho (yellow card) 73'; Schiattarella (yellow card) 82'	Stadium: San Siro; Referee: S. Peruzzo

24 November 2013 13	Livorno	0–2	Juventus	Livorno
15:00 CET (UTC+1)	Mbaye (yellow card) 39'; Siligardi (yellow card) 52'; Greco (yellow card) 54'; Luci (yellow card) 77'	Report	Llorente 63'; Asamoah (yellow card) 72'; Tevez 75'	Stadium: Armando Picchi; Referee: D. Massa

1 December 2013 14	Chievo	3–0	Livorno	Verona
15:00 CET (UTC+1)	Hetemaj (yellow card) 22'; Rigoni 36'; Théréau 56'; Dramé (yellow card) 76'; Paloschi 79'; Frey (yellow card) 81'; Dainelli (yellow card) 87'	Report	Greco (yellow card) 66'; Emeghara (yellow card) 68'	Stadium: Marc'Antonio Bentegodi; Referee: G. Rocchi

7 December 2013 15	Livorno	2–2	Milan	Livorno
18:00 CET (UTC+1)	Biagianti (yellow card) 9'; Coda (yellow card) 20'; Siligardi 26'; Emerson (yellow card) 31'; Paulinho 58', (yellow card) 70'; Mbaye (yellow card) 77'	Report	Balotelli 7', 83'; El Shaarawy (yellow card) 52'; Mexès (yellow card) 90'	Stadium: Armando Picchi; Referee: M. Guida

15 December 2013 16	Lazio	2–0	Livorno	Rome
15:00 CET (UTC+1)	Klose 19', 26'; Hernanes (yellow card) 31'; Radu (yellow card) 66'	Report	Coda (yellow card) 5'; Luci (yellow card) 43'; Schiattarella (yellow card) 45'; Greco (yellow card) 55'; Duncan (yellow card) 74'	Stadium: Olimpico; Referee: S. Peruzzo

21 December 2013 17	Livorno	1–2	Udinese	Livorno
18:00 CET (UTC+1)	Coda (yellow card) 8'; Schiattarella (yellow card) 14'; Siligardi 32'; Emerson (yellow card) 78'	Report	López 10'; Lazzari (yellow card) 17'; Heurtaux 65', (yellow card) 80'	Stadium: Armando Picchi; Referee: D. Doveri

5 January 2014 18	Fiorentina	1–0	Livorno	Florence
18:00 CET (UTC+1)	Iličić (yellow card) 21'; Aquilani (yellow card) 35'; Cuadrado (yellow card) 54'; Rodríguez 66', (yellow card) 80'	Report	Valentini (yellow card) 41'; Paulinho (yellow card) 45'; Rinaudo (yellow card) 69'; Luci (yellow card) 76'; Schiattarella (yellow card) 85'	Stadium: Artemio Franchi; Referee: P. Tagliavento

11 January 2014 19	Livorno	0–3	Parma	Livorno
18:00 CET (UTC+1)	Mbaye (yellow card) 50'	Report	Palladino 2'; Lucarelli (yellow card) 30'; Amauri 86', 90+3' (pen.)	Stadium: Armando Picchi; Referee: M. Irrati

18 January 2014 20	Roma	3–0	Livorno	Rome
18:00 CET (UTC+1)	Destro 6'; Strootman 36'; Ljajić 78'; Castán (yellow card) 82'	Report		Stadium: Olimpico; Referee: C. Russo

26 January 2014 21	Livorno	3–1	Sassuolo	Livorno
15:00 CET (UTC+1)	Greco 4', (yellow card) 45+1'; Paulinho 11'; Benassi 26'; Bardi (yellow card) 28'; Coda (yellow card) 35'	Report	Berardi (yellow card) 9', (goal) 28' (pen.); Rosi (yellow card) 15'; Zaza (yellow card) 46'; Biondini (yellow card) 54'; Manfredini (yellow card) 65'; Antei (yellow card) 75'	Stadium: Armando Picchi; Referee: D. Celi

2 February 2014 22	Catania	3–3	Livorno	Catania
15:00 CET (UTC+1)	Biraghi (yellow card) 36'; Bellusci (yellow card) 55'; Bergessio 61', (yellow card) 90+2'; Frison (yellow card) 71'; Barrientos 75'; Almirón 88', (yellow card) 89'	Report	Duncan (yellow card) 20'; Emeghara 50', 77'; Paulinho 72' (pen.), (yellow card) 77'; Benassi (yellow card) 80'; Emerson (yellow card) 90'; Mbaye (yellow card) 90+2'	Stadium: Angelo Massimino; Referee: M. Bergonzi

9 February 2014 23	Livorno	0–1	Genoa	Livorno
15:00 CET (UTC+1)	Coda (yellow card) 14'; Mesbah (yellow card) 32'; Greco (yellow card) 41'; Piccini (yellow card) 55'	Report	Antonelli 10'; Portanova (yellow card) 45'; Burdisso (yellow card) 75'; Sturaro (yellow card) 83'	Stadium: Armando Picchi; Referee: A. Gervasoni

16 February 2014 24	Cagliari	1–2	Livorno	Cagliari
15:00 CET (UTC+1)	Avramov (yellow card) 53'; Nenê 64'; Cossu (yellow card) 65'; Conti (red card) 71'	Report	Ceccherini (yellow card) 28' (yellow-red card) 85'; Emerson 43', (yellow card) 89'; Paulinho 53' (pen.); Mbaye (yellow card) 75'; Bardi (yellow card) 76'; Biagianti (yellow card) 78'; Benassi (red card) 90+1'	Stadium: Sant'Elia; Referee: A. De Marco

23 February 2014 25	Livorno	2–3	Hellas Verona	Livorno
12:30 CET (UTC+1)	Emerson (yellow card) 40'; Gemiti (yellow card) 70'; Paulinho 72'; Greco 73', (yellow card) 74'; Coda (yellow card) 90+4'	Report	Janković 33'; Rômulo 43'; Toni 45+1', (yellow card) 56'; Sala (yellow card) 82'	Stadium: Armando Picchi; Referee: S. Peruzzo

2 March 2014 26	Livorno	1–1	Napoli	Livorno
18:30 CET (UTC+1)	Reina 39' (o.g.); Benassi (yellow card) 52'; Mbaye (yellow card) 64'	Report	Mertens 32' (pen.); Britos (yellow card) 85'; Maggio (yellow card) 90+2'	Stadium: Armando Picchi; Referee: P. Mazzoleni

9 March 2014 27	Sampdoria	4–2	Livorno	Genoa
15:00 CET (UTC+1)	De Silvestri (yellow card) 36'; Krstičić 49'; Ceccherini 53' (o.g.); Okaka 68'; Soriano (yellow card) 73'; Gabbiadini 75'	Report	Mbaye 19', 27'; Biagianti (yellow card) 23'; Greco (yellow card) 54'; Bardi (yellow card) 75'	Stadium: Luigi Ferraris; Referee: P. Giacomelli

16 March 2014 28	Livorno	2–1	Bologna	Livorno
15:00 CET (UTC+1)	Ceccherini (yellow card) 40'; Benassi 46'; Emeghara (yellow card) 50' (yellow-red card) 85'; Paulinho 52'; Mbaye (yellow card) 71' (yellow-red card) 80'; Rinaudo (yellow card) 82'	Report	Pérez (yellow card) 55'; Christodoulopoulos 86' (pen.); Garics (yellow card) 87'; Krhin (yellow card) 90+2'	Stadium: Armando Picchi; Referee: M. Bergonzi

22 March 2014 29	Torino	3–1	Livorno	Turin
18:00 CET (UTC+1)	Immobile 25', 60', 67'	Report	Mesbah (yellow card) 45'; Siligardi 89'	Stadium: Olimpico di Torino; Referee: C. Russo

26 March 2014 30	Atalanta	2–0	Livorno	Bergamo
20:45 CET (UTC+1)	De Luca 22'; Denis 59'	Report	Castellini (yellow card) 30'	Stadium: Atleti Azzurri d'Italia; Referee: A. De Marco

31 March 2014 31	Livorno	2–2	Inter Milan	Livorno
21:00 CEST (UTC+2)	Paulinho 54'; Castellini (yellow card) 70'; Emeghara 85'	Report	Hernanes (yellow card) 20', (goal) 37'; Palacio 45+1'; Samuel (yellow card) 81'; Botta (yellow card) 87' (not on pitch)	Stadium: Armando Picchi; Referee: G. Calvarese

7 April 2014 32	Juventus	2–0	Livorno	Turin
19:00 CEST (UTC+2)	Llorente 32', 35'	Report	Castellini (yellow card) 28'	Stadium: Juventus Stadium; Referee: A. Gervasoni

13 April 2014 33	Livorno	2–4	Chievo	Livorno
15:00 CEST (UTC+2)	Siligardi 6'; Paulinho 34' (pen.); Benassi (yellow card) 37'; Biagianti (yellow card) 55'; Coda (yellow card) 61'	Report	Paloschi 9', 45+2', 56'; Théréau 23', (yellow card) 26'; Guana (yellow card) 69'; Radovanović (yellow card) 75'; Hetemaj (yellow card) 90'	Stadium: Armando Picchi; Referee: A. Damato

19 April 2014 34	Milan	3–0	Livorno	Milan
15:00 CEST (UTC+2)	De Jong (yellow card) 24'; Abate (yellow card) 34'; Balotelli 43'; Taarabt 51'; Rami (yellow card) 72'; Pazzini 83'	Report	Duncan (yellow card) 21'; Rinaudo (yellow card) 32'	Stadium: San Siro; Referee: M. Irrati

27 April 2014 35	Livorno	0–2	Lazio	Livorno
15:00 CEST (UTC+2)	Rinaudo (yellow card) 50'; Greco (yellow card) 52'; Bardi (yellow card) 63'; Mesbah (yellow card) 86'	Report	Mauri 15'; Candreva 51' (pen.); Pereirinha (yellow card) 90'	Stadium: Armando Picchi; Referee: A. De Marco

4 May 2014 36	Udinese	5–3	Livorno	Udine
15:00 CEST (UTC+2)	Di Natale (penalty missed) 18', 19', 45'; Badu 21'; Danilo (yellow card) 28'; Pereyra 33'; Gabriel Silva 44'	Report	Paulinho 13', 29', (yellow card) 81'; Greco (yellow card) 50'; Mesbah (yellow card) 53', (goal) 88'	Stadium: Friuli; Referee: G. Rocchi

11 May 2014 37	Livorno	0–1	Fiorentina	Livorno
15:00 CEST (UTC+2)	Castellini (yellow card) 11'; Ceccherini (yellow card) 54'; Mosquera (yellow card) 78'; Belfodil (yellow card) 89'; Benassi (yellow card) 90'; Borja (yellow card) 90+2' (red card) 90+3'	Report	Matos (yellow card) 28'; Vargas (yellow card) 45'; Cuadrado 57'; Roncaglia (yellow card) 81'	Stadium: Armando Picchi; Referee: P. Giacomelli

18 May 2014 38	Parma	2–0	Livorno	Parma
20:45 CEST (UTC+2)	Amauri 62', 80'	Report	Ceccherini (yellow card) 28'	Stadium: Ennio Tardini; Referee: A. De Marco

=== Coppa Italia ===
17 August 2013 Third round	Livorno	0–1	Siena	Livorno
17:00 CEST (UTC+2)	Schiattarella (yellow card) 50'; Emerson (yellow card) 73'	Report	Ângelo 44'; Giacomazzi (yellow card) 85'	Stadium: Armando Picchi
