= 2013–14 Udinese Calcio season =

Udinese
2013–14 season
- President: Franco Soldati
- Manager: Francesco Guidolin
- Stadium: Stadio Friuli
- Serie A: 13th
- Coppa Italia: Semi-finals
- UEFA Europa League: Play-off round
- Top goalscorer: League: Antonio Di Natale (17); All: Antonio Di Natale (20)
- Highest home attendance: 22,262 vs Juventus (14 April 2014, Serie A)
- Lowest home attendance: 4,326 vs Široki Brijeg (8 August 2013, Europa League)
- Average home league attendance: 14,252
Home colours	Away colours	Third colours

The 2013–14 season was Udinese Calcio's 34th season in Serie A and their 19th consecutive season in the top-flight. The club competed in Serie A, finishing 13th, and reached the semi-finals of the Coppa Italia. Having finished fifth in the 2012–13 Serie A, Udinese qualified for the third qualifying round of the UEFA Europa League. The team, however, failed to qualify for the group stage of the tournament, becoming the only Italian team to fail to qualify for a European group stage during the 2013–14 season.

== Players ==
=== Squad information ===
Note: Flags indicate national team as defined under FIFA eligibility rules; some limited exceptions apply. Players may hold more than one non-FIFA nationality.

No.	Pos.	Nation	Player
1	GK	SRB	Željko Brkić
2	DF	BRA	Neuton
3	MF	BRA	Allan
4	DF	BRA	Naldo
5	DF	BRA	Danilo
6	DF	CRO	Igor Bubnjić
7	MF	GHA	Emmanuel Agyemang-Badu
8	DF	SRB	Dušan Basta
9	FW	COL	Luis Muriel
10	FW	ITA	Antonio Di Natale (captain)
11	DF	ITA	Maurizio Domizzi
14	MF	CRO	Frano Mlinar
17	FW	URU	Nicolás López
18	MF	BRA	Jadson

No.	Pos.	Nation	Player
20	MF	ALG	Hassan Yebda (on loan from Granada)
19	DF	BRA	Douglas Santos (on loan from Granada)
21	MF	ITA	Andrea Lazzari (on loan from Fiorentina)
22	GK	ITA	Simone Scuffet
27	MF	SUI	Silvan Widmer
30	GK	CRO	Ivan Kelava
32	MF	POR	Bruno Fernandes
34	DF	BRA	Gabriel Silva
37	MF	ARG	Roberto Pereyra
66	MF	ITA	Giampiero Pinzi
70	MF	BRA	Maicosuel
75	DF	FRA	Thomas Heurtaux
94	MF	POL	Piotr Zieliński
99	GK	ITA	Francesco Benussi
—	FW	ITA	Emanuele Rovini

== Competitions ==
=== Serie A ===
==== League table ====
Pos	Team	Pld	W	D	L	GF	GA	GD	Pts
11	Atalanta	38	15	5	18	43	51	−8	50
12	Sampdoria	38	12	9	17	48	62	−14	45
13	Udinese	38	12	8	18	46	57	−11	44 (Note: Udinese finished ahead of Genoa on head-to-head away goals scored: Udinese 1-0 Genoa, Udinese 3-3 Genoa.)
14	Genoa	38	11	11	16	41	50	−9	44
15	Cagliari	38	9	12	17	34	53	−19	39

Source: Serie A, Soccerway
Rules for classification: 1st points; 2nd head-to-head points; 3rd head-to-head goal difference; 4th goal difference; 5th number of goals scored; 6th public draw.
(Head-to-head record is applied for clubs with the same number of points only once all matches between said clubs have been played)

==== Results summary ====
Overall								Home						Away					
Pld	W	D	L	GF	GA	GD	Pts	W	D	L	GF	GA	GD	W	D	L	GF	GA	GD
38	12	8	18	46	57	−11	44	9	4	6	27	24	+3	3	4	12	19	33	−14

Last updated: 17 May 2014.
Source: Competitive matches

==== Results by round ====
Round	1	2	3	4	5	6	7	8	9	10	11	12	13	14	15	16	17	18	19	20	21	22	23	24	25	26	27	28	29	30	31	32	33	34	35	36	37	38
Ground	A	H	H	A	H	A	H	A	H	A	H	A	H	A	A	H	A	H	A	H	A	A	H	A	H	A	H	A	H	A	H	A	H	H	A	H	A	H
Result	L	W	D	L	W	L	W	L	L	W	L	L	W	L	D	L	W	L	L	L	L	W	W	D	D	L	W	L	W	D	W	L	L	D	L	W	D	D
Position	15	8	10	12	9	12	8	11	12	12	12	12	11	13	14	15	15	15	15	15	15	15	14	13	12	15	14	14	14	14	14	14	14	13	15	13	13	13

Updated to match(es) played on 17 May 2014. Source: Competitive matches
A = Away; H = Home; W = Win; D = Draw; L = Loss

==== Matches ====
25 August 2013 1	Lazio	2–1	Udinese	Rome
15:00 CEST (UTC+02:00)	Novaretti (yellow card) 7'; Hernanes 13', (yellow card) 34'; Candreva 16' (pen.); Biglia (yellow card) 62'; Cavanda (yellow card) 90+1'	Report	Naldo (yellow card) 1'; Kelava (yellow card) 16'; Muriel 60'; Domizzi (yellow card) 90+5'	Stadium: Stadio Olimpico; Attendance: 24,858; Referee: Andrea Gervasoni

1 September 2013 2	Udinese	3–1	Parma	Udine
15:00 CEST (UTC+02:00)	Agyemang-Badu 11'; Heurtaux 72'; Muriel 89' (pen.)	Report	Cassani (yellow card) 50'; Lucarelli (yellow card) 84'; Cassano 84', (yellow card) 90'; Mendes (yellow card) 87'	Stadium: Stadio Friuli; Attendance: 9,750; Referee: Emilio Ostinelli

15 September 2013 3	Udinese	1–1	Bologna	Udine
15:00 CEST (UTC+02:00)	Muriel (yellow card) 64'; Di Natale 85'	Report	Pazienza (yellow card) 29'; Kone (yellow card) 40'; Della Rocca (yellow card) 47'; Moscardelli (yellow card) 51'; Diamanti 71'	Stadium: Stadio Friuli; Attendance: 14,000; Referee: Daniele Doveri

22 September 2013 4	Chievo	2–1	Udinese	Verona
18:00 CEST (UTC+02:00)	Pellissier 13', (yellow card) 56'; Cesar (yellow card) 34'; Rigoni 40'; Estigarribia (yellow card) 42'; Sestu (yellow card) 73'; Frey (yellow card) 90+4'	Report	Maicosuel 1'; Basta (yellow card) 27'; Danilo (yellow card) 31'; Gabriel Silva (yellow card) 68'	Stadium: Stadio Marc'Antonio Bentegodi; Attendance: 7,800; Referee: Dino Tommasi

24 September 2013 5	Udinese	1–0	Genoa	Udine
20:45 CEST (UTC+02:00)	Di Natale (yellow card) 35', (goal) 79'	Report	Antonini (yellow card) 48'; Portanova (yellow card) 78'; Lodi (yellow card) 90+2'	Stadium: Stadio Friuli; Referee: Daniele Orsato

29 September 2013 6	Atalanta	2–0	Udinese	Bergamo
15:00 CEST (UTC+02:00)	Denis 45+1', 63', (yellow card) 58'	Report	Agyemang-Badu (yellow card) 49'; Danilo (yellow card) 57'; Gabriel Silva (yellow card) 78'	Stadium: Stadio Atleti Azzurri d'Italia; Referee: Piero Giacomelli

6 October 2013 7	Udinese	2–0	Cagliari	Udine
15:00 CEST (UTC+02:00)	Danilo 33'; Pinzi (yellow card) 40'; Di Natale 53'	Report	Dessena (yellow card) 52'	Stadium: Stadio Friuli; Referee: Sebastiano Peruzzo

19 October 2013 8	Milan	1–0	Udinese	Milan
20:45 CEST (UTC+02:00)	Birsa 22'; Montolivo (yellow card) 25'; Muntari (yellow card) 52'; Robinho (yellow card) 81'	Report	Pinzi (yellow card) 20'; Pereyra (yellow card) 52'; Allan (yellow card) 81'	Stadium: San Siro; Referee: Marco Guida

27 October 2013 9	Udinese	0–1	Roma	Udine
15:00 CET (UTC+01:00)	Muriel (yellow card) 20'; Heurtaux (yellow card) 41'; Pereyra (yellow card) 86'; Pinzi (yellow card) 90+4'	Report	Maicon (yellow card) 11' (yellow-red card) 66'; De Rossi (yellow card) 24'; Florenzi (yellow card) 39'; Bradley 82'; Marquinho (yellow card) 90+4'	Stadium: Stadio Friuli; Attendance: 13,000; Referee: Mauro Bergonzi

30 October 2013 10	Sassuolo	1–2	Udinese	Reggio Emilia
20:45 CET (UTC+01:00)	Ziegler (yellow card) 17'; Zaza 25', (red card) 80'; Floro Flores (yellow card) 89'	Report	Di Natale 18' (pen.); Muriel 56'; Pinzi (yellow card) 65'; Allan (yellow card) 66'; Domizzi (yellow card) 90+2'	Stadium: Mapei Stadium – Città del Tricolore; Attendance: 13,000; Referee: Riccardo Pinzani

3 November 2013 11	Udinese	0–3	Internazionale	Udine
15:00 CET (UTC+01:00)		Report	Palacio 25'; Ranocchia 29', (yellow card) 74'; Pereira (yellow card) 76'; Juan (yellow card) 90'; Álvarez 90+1'	Stadium: Stadio Friuli; Attendance: 10,000; Referee: Davide Massa

9 November 2013 12	Catanaia	1–0	Udinese	Catania
18:00 CET (UTC+01:00)	López 30' (pen.), (yellow card) 72'; Guarente (yellow card) 38'	Report	Domizzi (yellow card) 4'; Basta (yellow card) 7'; Pinzi (yellow card) 69'	Stadium: Stadio Angelo Massimino; Attendance: 12,986; Referee: Andrea De Marco

24 November 2013 13	Udinese	1–0	Fiorentina	Udine
15:00 CET (UTC+01:00)	Danilo (yellow card) 18'; Heurtaux 34'; Fernandes (yellow card) 88'	Report	Aquilani (yellow card) 33'; Rodríguez (yellow card) 83'	Stadium: Stadio Friuli; Attendance: 13,000; Referee: Paolo Tagliavento

1 December 2013 14	Juventus	1–0	Udinese	Turin
18:30 CET (UTC+01:00)	Llorente (yellow card) 45+1', (goal) 90+1'; Quagliarella (yellow card) 77'	Report	Heurtaux (yellow card) 42'	Stadium: Juventus Stadium; Attendance: 32,279; Referee: Gianpaolo Calvarese

7 December 2013 15	Napoli	3–3	Udinese	Naples
20:45 CET (UTC+01:00)	Albiol (yellow card) 36'; Pandev 38', 41', (yellow card) 52'; Fernández (yellow card) 48'; Džemaili 71', (yellow card) 75'	Report	Heurtaux 45'; Fernandes (yellow card) 62', (goal) 70'; Basta 80'; Domizzi (yellow card) 89'	Stadium: Stadio San Paolo; Attendance: 34,720; Referee: Andrea Gervasoni

15 December 2013 16	Udinese	0–2	Torino	Udine
15:00 CET (UTC+01:00)	Lazzari (yellow card) 21'; Naldo (yellow card) 59'	Report	Maksimović (yellow card) 16'; Farnerud (yellow card) 40', (goal) 48'; Immobile 75', (yellow card) 79'	Stadium: Stadio Friuli; Attendance: 13,135; Referee: Massimiliano Irrati

21 December 2013 17	Livorno	1–2	Udinese	Livorno
18:00 CET (UTC+01:00)	Coda (yellow card) 8'; Luci (yellow card) 11'; Schiattarella (yellow card) 14'; Siligardi 32'; Emerson (yellow card) 78'	Report	López 10'; Lazzari (yellow card) 17'; Heurtaux 65', (yellow card) 80'	Stadium: Stadio Armando Picchi; Attendance: 8,748; Referee: Daniele Doveri

6 January 2014 18	Udinese	1–3	Hellas Verona	Udine
15:00 CET (UTC+01:00)	Pereyra 43'	Report	Toni 8', 39', (yellow card) 90'; Janković (yellow card) 42'; Iturbe 70'	Stadium: Stadio Friuli; Attendance: 13,826; Referee: Angelo Cervellera

13 January 2014 19	Sampdoria	3–0	Udinese	Genoa
19:00 CET (UTC+01:00)	Éder 16' (pen.), 47'; Soriano (yellow card) 18' (yellow-red card) 61'; Krstičić (yellow card) 34'; Wszołek (yellow card) 52'; Gastaldello 87'; Bjarnason (yellow card) 90'	Report	Kelava (yellow card) 15'; Allan (yellow card) 27' (yellow-red card) 35'; Silva (yellow card) 29' (yellow-red card) 69'; Agyemang-Badu (yellow card) 57'; Domizzi (yellow card) 65'	Stadium: Stadio Luigi Ferraris; Attendance: 20,076; Referee: Paolo Mazzoleni

19 January 2014 20	Udinese	2–3	Lazio	Udine
12:30 CET (UTC+01:00)	Di Natale 8' (pen.); Pinzi (yellow card) 51'; Agyemang-Badu 68'; Domizzi (yellow card) 90+3'	Report	Cavanda (yellow card) 7'; Klose (yellow card) 38'; Onazi (yellow card) 49' (yellow-red card) 54'; Candreva 62' (pen.); Lulić (yellow card) 72'; Lazzari 82' (o.g.); Hernanes 90'	Stadium: Stadio Friuli; Attendance: 12,685; Referee: Gianluca Rocchi

26 January 2014 21	Parma	1–0	Udinese	Parma
15:00 CET (UTC+01:00)	Parolo (yellow card) 7'; Felipe (yellow card) 9'; Amauri 35'; Acquah (yellow card) 78'	Report	Agyemang-Badu (yellow card) 11'; Allan (yellow card) 45+1'; Pinzi (yellow card) 90+3'	Stadium: Stadio Ennio Tardini; Attendance: 10,917; Referee: Sebastiano Peruzzo

1 February 2014 22	Bologna	0–2	Udinese	Bologna
18:00 CET (UTC+01:00)	Cherubin (yellow card) 22'; Kone (yellow card) 50'; Moscardelli (yellow card) 86'	Report	Allan (yellow card) 4'; Di Natale 15' (pen.); Domizzi (yellow card) 22'; Pinzi (yellow card) 67'; Pereyra (yellow card) 82'; López 90+2'	Stadium: Stadio Renato Dall'Ara; Attendance: 15,227; Referee: Gianpaolo Calvarese

8 February 2014 23	Udinese	3–0	Chievo	Udine
18:00 CET (UTC+01:00)	Di Natale 56'; Fernandes 74'; Agyemang-Badu 86'	Report	Stoian (yellow card) 34'; Cesar (yellow card) 71'	Stadium: Stadio Friuli; Attendance: 12,097; Referee: Luca Banti

16 February 2014 24	Genoa	3–3	Udinese	Genoa
15:00 CET (UTC+01:00)	Konaté 45'; Burdisso (yellow card) 47'; Matuzalém (yellow card) 54'; Gilardino 69', 79', (yellow card) 80'	Report	Basta 35'; Fernandes 40'; Muriel 48' (pen.)	Stadium: Stadio Luigi Ferraris; Attendance: 18,061; Referee: Paolo Tagliavento

23 February 2014 25	Udinese	1–1	Atalanta	Udine
15:00 CET (UTC+01:00)	Domizzi (yellow card) 27'; Fernandes (yellow card) 33'; Di Natale 71' (pen.)	Report	Brivio 24'; Raimondi (yellow card) 49'; Stendardo (yellow card) 71'	Stadium: Stadio Friuli; Attendance: 12,245; Referee: Marco Di Bello

2 March 2014 26	Cagliari	3–0	Udinese	Cagliari
12:30 CET (UTC+01:00)	Ibarbo 18'; Pinilla (yellow card) 30'; Cossu (yellow card) 33'; Vecino 81'; Ibraimi 88', (yellow card) 90'	Report	Danilo (yellow card) 80'	Stadium: Stadio Sant'Elia; Attendance: 4,500; Referee: Paolo Valeri

8 March 2014 27	Udinese	1–0	Milan	Udine
18:00 CET (UTC+01:00)	Fernandes (yellow card) 12'; Di Natale 67'	Report	Muntari (yellow card) 11'; De Sciglio (yellow card) 18'; Mexès (yellow card) 51'	Stadium: Stadio Friuli; Attendance: 20,797; Referee: Carmine Russo

17 March 2014 28	Roma	3–2	Udinese	Rome
21:00 CET (UTC+01:00)	Totti 22'; Nainggolan (yellow card) 27'; Destro 30'; Torosidis 69'	Report	Pinzi 51'; Widmer (yellow card) 68'; Basta 80'	Stadium: Stadio Olimpico; Attendance: 34,274; Referee: Paolo Tagliavento

23 March 2014 29	Udinese	1–0	Sassuolo	Udine
15:00 CET (UTC+01:00)	Basta (yellow card) 1'; Di Natale 26'; Pinzi (yellow card) 66'	Report	Gazzola (yellow card) 7'; Cannavaro (yellow card) 34'; Masucci (yellow card) 74'	Stadium: Stadio Friuli; Attendance: 12,431; Referee: Sebastiano Peruzzo

27 March 2014 30	Internazionale	0–0	Udinese	Milan
20:45 CET (UTC+01:00)	Samuel (yellow card) 89'	Report	Scuffet (yellow card) 62'	Stadium: San Siro; Attendance: 32,840; Referee: Andrea Gervasoni

31 March 2014 31	Udinese	1–0	Catania	Udine
19:00 CEST (UTC+02:00)	Silva (yellow card) 43'; Danilo (yellow card) 60'; Di Natale 68'	Report	Bellusci (yellow card) 29'; Rinaudo (yellow card) 31'; Izco (yellow card) 58'; Bergessio (yellow card) 71'; Leto (yellow card) 81'	Stadium: Stadio Friuli; Attendance: 15,005; Referee: Daniele Doveri

6 April 2014 32	Fiorentina	2–1	Udinese	Florence
15:00 CEST (UTC+02:00)	Cuadrado 25'; Ambrosini (yellow card) 47'; Rodríguez 72' (pen.)	Report	Agyemang-Badu (yellow card) 35'; Muriel (yellow card) 62'; Danilo (yellow card) 71'; Pasqual 82' (o.g.); Pereyra (yellow card) 89'; Heurtaux (yellow card) 90+1'	Stadium: Stadio Artemio Franchi; Attendance: 31,073; Referee: Domenico Celi

14 April 2014 33	Udinese	0–2	Juventus	Udine
20:45 CEST (UTC+02:00)	Heurtaux (yellow card) 60'	Report	Giovinco 16'; Bonucci (yellow card) 18'; Llorente 26'; Ogbonna (yellow card) 54'; Lichtsteiner (yellow card) 75'	Stadium: Stadio Friuli; Attendance: 22,262; Referee: Nicola Rizzoli

19 April 2014 34	Udinese	1–1	Napoli	Udine
15:00 CEST (UTC+02:00)	Pinzi (yellow card) 1'; Pereyra (yellow card) 37'; Fernandes 54'	Report	Fernández (yellow card) 20' (yellow-red card) 89'; Callejón 39'; Behrami (yellow card) 65'; Jorginho (yellow card) 76'	Stadium: Stadio Friuli; Attendance: 16,219; Referee: Gianpaolo Calvarese

27 April 2014 35	Torino	2–0	Udinese	Turin
15:00 CEST (UTC+02:00)	El Kaddouri 15'; Immobile 56'	Report	Agyemang-Badu (yellow card) 29'; Heurtaux (yellow card) 53'; Pinzi (yellow card) 68'	Stadium: Stadio Olimpico di Torino; Attendance: 15,292; Referee: Paolo Valeri

4 May 2014 36	Udinese	5–3	Livorno	Udine
15:00 CEST (UTC+02:00)	Di Natale 19', 45'; Agyemang-Badu 21'; Danilo (yellow card) 29'; Pereyra 33'; Silva 44'	Report	Paulinho 13', 29', (yellow card) 81'; Greco (yellow card) 50'; Mesbah (yellow card) 53', (goal) 88'	Stadium: Stadio Friuli; Attendance: 13,247; Referee: Gianluca Rocchi

10 May 2014 37	Hellas Verona	2–2	Udinese	Verona
18:00 CEST (UTC+02:00)	Toni 14' (pen.); Juanito (yellow card) 53'; Hallfreðsson 54'; Donadel (yellow card) 81'	Report	Heurtaux (yellow card) 11'; Domizzi (yellow card) 53'; Di Natale 56'; Danilo (yellow card) 57'; Allan (yellow card) 65'; Agyemang-Badu 90+1'	Stadium: Stadio Marc'Antonio Bentegodi; Attendance: 22,115; Referee: Dino Tommasi

17 May 2014 38	Udinese	3–3	Sampdoria	Udine
20:45 CEST (UTC+02:00)	Di Natale 26', 32', 88'; Pinzi (yellow card) 62'; Domizzi (yellow card) 75'; López (yellow card) 77'	Report	Okaka 10'; Mustafi (yellow card) 42'; Éder (yellow card) 48', (goal) 53'; Soriano 55'	Stadium: Stadio Friuli; Attendance: 14,862; Referee: Francesco Paolo Saia

=== Coppa Italia ===
9 January 2014 Round of 16	Udinese	1–0	Internazionale	Udine
21:00 CET (UTC+01:00)	Maicosuel 32'; Agyemang-Badu (yellow card) 57'; Allan (yellow card) 60'; Danilo (yellow card) 65'; Pinzi (yellow card) 73'	Report	Kovačić (yellow card) 21'; Carrizo (yellow card) 56'; Palacio (yellow card) 83'	Stadium: Stadio Friuli; Attendance: 6,242; Referee: Gianpaolo Calvarese

22 January 2014 Quarter-finals	Milan	1–2	Udinese	Milan
21:00 CET (UTC+01:00)	Balotelli 6'; Emanuelson (yellow card) 41'; Birsa (yellow card) 52'; De Sciglio (yellow card) 65'; Honda (yellow card) 84'; Mexès (yellow card) 85'	Report	Lazzari (yellow card) 12'; Heurtaux (yellow card) 35'; Muriel 41' (pen.); Danilo (yellow card) 72'; López 77'	Stadium: San Siro; Attendance: 10,227; Referee: Marco Guida

4 February 2014 Semi-finals; First leg	Udinese	2–1	Fiorentina	Udine
21:00 CET (UTC+01:00)	Di Natale 36', (yellow card) 44'; Muriel 82', (yellow card) 90+3'	Report	Valero (yellow card) 38'; Vargas 44', (yellow card) 53'	Stadium: Stadio Friuli; Attendance: 7,000; Referee: Carmine Russo

11 February 2014 Semi-finals; Second leg	Fiorentina	2–0 (3–2 agg.)	Udinese	Florence
20:45 CET (UTC+01:00)	Pasqual 14'; Aquilani (yellow card) 58'; Cuadrado 61', (yellow card) 90+2'	Report	Domizzi (yellow card) 83' (red card) 90+7'; Agyemang-Badu (red card) 90+4'; Muriel (yellow card) 90+5'	Stadium: Stadio Artemio Franchi; Attendance: 30,000; Referee: Davide Massa

=== UEFA Europa League ===
==== Third qualifying round ====
1 August 2013 First leg	Široki Brijeg (Bosnia and Herzegovina)	1–3	(Italy) Udinese	Zenica, Bosnia and Herzegovina
20:45 CEST (UTC+02:00)	Zakarić (yellow card) 42'; Marković (yellow card) 45+1'; Ćorić 77'	Report	Di Natale 16'; Muriel 31', 39'	Stadium: Bilino Polje; Attendance: 4,500; Referee: Halis Özkahya (Turkey)

8 August 2013 Second leg	Udinese (Italy)	4–0 (7–1 agg.)	(Bosnia and Herzegovina) Široki Brijeg	Trieste, Italy
20:45 CEST (UTC+02:00)	Di Natale 9'; Naldo (yellow card) 32'; Pereyra (yellow card) 53'; Lazzari 82'; Basta 86'; Vydra 90+3'	Report	Plazonić (yellow card) 36'; Špikić (yellow card) 83'	Stadium: Stadio Nereo Rocco; Attendance: 4,326; Referee: Antti Munukka (Finland)

==== Play-off round ====
22 August 2013 First leg	Udinese (Italy)	1–3	(Czech Republic) Slovan Liberec	Trieste, Italy
20:45 CEST(UTC+02:00)	Gabriel Silva 35'; Domizzi (yellow card) 56'	Report	Rybalka 16'; Delarge (yellow card) 38', (goal) 49'; Kušnír (yellow card) 64', (goal) 83'	Stadium: Stadio Nereo Rocco; Attendance: 10,000; Referee: Tom Harald Hagen (Norway)

29 August 2013 Second leg	Slovan Liberec (Czech Republic)	1–1 (4–2 agg.)	(Italy) Udinese	Liberec, Czech Republic
20:45 CEST (UTC+02:00)	Delarge 23'; Rybalka (yellow card) 50'; Fleišman (yellow card) 68'; Šural (yellow card) 73'	Report	Lazzari 42'; Pereyra (yellow card) 55' (yellow-red card) 71'; Basta (yellow card) 78'	Stadium: Stadion u Nisy; Attendance: 9,700; Referee: Anastasios Sidiropoulos (Greece)
