= Pigliaru =

Pigliaru is a Sardinian surname. Notable people with the surname include:

- Antonio Pigliaru (1922–1969), Italian jurist and philosopher
- Francesco Pigliaru (born 1954), Italian economist, politician and professor

== See also ==
- Pagliarulo
