= Gioè =

Gioè is a surname. Notable people with the surname include:

- Bryan Gioè (born 1993), Italian footballer
- Charles Gioe (1904–1954), American gangster
- Claudio Gioè (born 1975), Italian actor
