= Leonardo Bellandi =

Italian footballer

Personal information
- Date of birth: 12 January 2000 (age 26)
- Place of birth: Livorno, Italy
- Position: Midfielder

Team information
- Current team: Livorno
- Number: 30

Youth career
- –2020: Livorno

Senior career*
Years	Team	Apps	(Gls)
2020–	Livorno	2	(0)
- * Club domestic league appearances and goals as of 18:04, 28 July 2020 (UTC)

Leonardo Bellandi (born 12 January 2000) is an Italian footballer who plays as a midfielder for Serie B side Livorno.

== Club statistics ==
=== Club ===
As of 28 July 2020.

Club	Season	League			Cup		Other		Total	
Club	Season	Division	Apps	Goals	Apps	Goals	Apps	Goals	Apps	Goals
Livorno	2019–20	Serie B	2	0	0	0	0	0	2	0
Career total			2	0	0	0	0	0	2	0
