= Pagliarulo =

Pagliarulo is an Italian surname. Notable people with the surname include:

- Emil Pagliarulo, American video game designer
- Gianfranco Pagliarulo (born 1949), Italian politician
- Joe Pagliarulo (born 1966), American television and radio personality
- Luca Pagliarulo (born 1983), Italian footballer
- Mike Pagliarulo (born 1960), American baseball player
