= Miguel Borja =

Colombian footballer (born 1993)

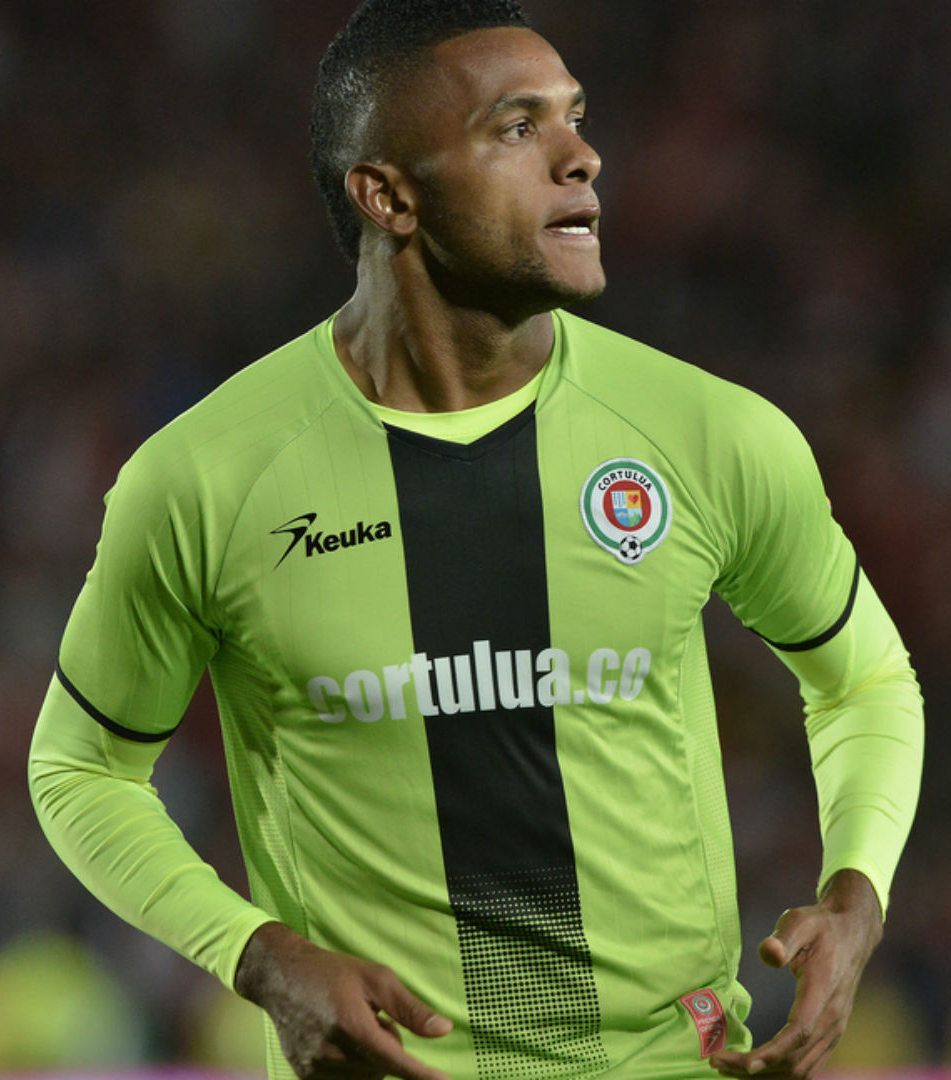
- Borja playing for Cortuluá in 2016

Personal information
- Full name: Miguel Ángel Borja Hernández
- Date of birth: 26 January 1993 (age 33)
- Place of birth: Tierralta, Colombia
- Height: 1.83 m (6 ft 0 in)
- Position: Forward

Team information
- Current team: América
- Number: 93

Youth career
- 2011: Deportivo Cali

Senior career*
Years	Team	Apps	(Gls)
2011	Deportivo Cali	0	(0)
2011	Cúcuta Deportivo	5	(0)
2012–2014	Cortuluá	33	(8)
2013	→ La Equidad (loan)	2	(4)
2013–2014	→ Livorno (loan)	8	(0)
2014	→ Olimpo (loan)	16	(3)
2015	→ Santa Fe (loan)	33	(10)
2016	Cortuluá	21	(19)
2016	Atlético Nacional	7	(1)
2017–2021	Palmeiras	49	(10)
2020–2021	→ Atlético Junior (loan)	37	(22)
2021	→ Grêmio (loan)	14	(5)
2022	Atlético Junior	17	(10)
2022–2025	River Plate	117	(51)
2026	Al Wasl	13	(5)
2026–	América	7	(6)

International career^{‡}
2013	Colombia U20	15	(5)
2016	Colombia Olympic	5	(0)
2016–	Colombia	30	(9)
Medal record
Representing Colombia
Men's football
Copa América
Runner-up	2024 United States
Third place	2021 Brazil
- * Club domestic league appearances and goals as of 21 October 2026 ‡ National team caps and goals as of 14 July 2024 (UTC)

Miguel Ángel Borja Hernández (born 26 January 1993) is a Colombian professional footballer who plays as a forward for Liga MX club América and the Colombia national team.

After moving between several Colombian clubs early in his career, he had his breakthrough in 2016 with Cortuluá, scoring 19 goals to finish as the league's top scorer. He then joined Atlético Nacional, where he quickly established himself as a decisive figure, netting crucial goals in their triumphant 2016 Copa Libertadores campaign. His performances earned him the prestigious title of South American Footballer of the Year. In 2017, he made a high-profile move to Brazilian club Palmeiras, winning the Brasileirão the following season. In 2022, he signed with Argentine giants River Plate, where he captured multiple titles, including the 2023 Primera División championship.

At youth level, Borja was part of the Colombia under-20 squad that won the 2013 South American Youth Football Championship. He also represented Colombia in the 2016 Rio de Janeiro Olympic Games, reaching the quarter-finals. He made his senior debut for Colombia in November 2016 during a 2018 FIFA World Cup qualifier against Chile and scored his first two goals for the national team the following year in a 4–0 friendly win over China. Borja was included in Colombia's squad for the 2018 FIFA World Cup and participated in the 2021 Copa América, where his country achieved third place, as well as the 2024 Copa América, where they finished as runners-up.

== Club career ==
=== Colombia ===
Borja began his career with Deportivo Cali, making his professional debut in 2011. That same year, he was transferred to Cucuta Deportivo, club in which he had few chances to play. He would soon be transferred again, this time to play for Categoría Primera B side, Cortuluá. Borja would make a name for himself in the second division of Colombia, often being referred to as a 'fast' and 'complete goalscorer', as well as boasting impressive strength on the ball. His impressive performances with Cortuluá eventually led him to becoming an alternative striker for Colombia's national under-20 team in 2013. On 17 January 2013, it was reported that Independiente Medellin had been interested in acquiring Borja's services. However, nothing was finalized and Borja was eventually sold to first division side, La Equidad. In his 2 disputable games, Borja scored 4 goals before being transferred to Serie A side Livorno.

=== Livorno and Olimpo ===
During the summer of 2013, it was confirmed that Borja would join Italian club Livorno on loan. The loan consisted of a fee of €150,000 with an option to buy for €1.5 million.

His debut for Le Triglie came on 20 October, coming off the bench in a 1–2 loss to Sampdoria.

Borja made seven season appearances for the club but failed to score a goal. Livorno was eventually regulated to the Serie B after placing last for the season.

Shortly after Livorno were relegated, Borja was sent on loan to Argentine club Club Olimpo, where he scored three in sixteen games.

=== Return to Colombia ===
Borja was loaned to Independiente Santa Fe for the second half of 2015. That season, Borja scored ten goals in thirty-three matches. He won the 2015 Copa Sudamericana with the team (he played seven matches with no goals).

For the 2016 season, he was sold to Cortuluá who was 17th in the league the previous season. In the Apertura tournament of the season, Borja scored a record of nineteen goals in twenty-one matches, breaking the record of most goals scored by a player in a league tournament (the previous record was held by Jackson Martínez, with eighteen goals in the 2009 Finalizacion). His team Cortuluá reached the Semifinals, which they lost to Independiente Medellín.

He was transferred again on 8 June, this time to Atlético Nacional. On 6 July, during his first match for his new team, while playing against São Paulo in the semi-finals of the Copa Libertadores, he scored twice, a feat he repeated in the second leg a week after. Then, on 27 July 2016, he went on to score the definitive goal in the final series against Ecuadorian team Independiente del Valle, which Atlético Nacional ended up winning 2–1 on the aggregate. At the end of the year, Borja was included in the best 11 of the year.

=== Palmeiras ===
On 9 February 2017, it was announced that Borja had agreed to transfer to Brazilian side Palmeiras. He signed a five-year deal for a fee believed to be around US$10.5 million. Borja became the fourth most expensive transfer of Brazilian football.

=== Junior ===
On 28 December 2019, Borja signed a one-year loan deal with Atlético Junior. On 8 September 2020, in the first leg of the 2020 Superliga Colombiana, which had been moved from January to September due to the COVID-19 pandemic, Borja scored a penalty in an eventual 2–1 loss against América de Cali. However, this goal later proved to be crucial in the second leg, with Junior winning the second leg 2-0 and winning the title 3–2 on aggregate.

=== Grêmio ===
On 5 August 2021, Borja signed with Grêmio until December 2022 on loaned from Palmeiras, and was given the number 9 shirt.

=== River Plate ===
On 12 July 2022, Borja signed a contract with Argentine giants River Plate, running until December 2025. During his time in River, Borja applied for Argentine citizenship, which he formally received in October 2025.

=== Club América ===
On 20 August 2026, following a short stint with Al Wasl in the UAE Pro League, Club América reached an agreement to sign Borja.

== International career ==
Borja was included in Colombia's 23 man squad for the 2018 FIFA World Cup in Russia, making one substitute appearance in the group stage match against Senegal.

== Career statistics ==
=== Club ===
As of match played on 19 September 2026

Appearances and goals by club, season and competition
Club	Season	League			National cup		Continental		Other		Total	
Club	Season	Division	Apps	Goals	Apps	Goals	Apps	Goals	Apps	Goals	Apps	Goals
Deportivo Cali	2011	Categoría Primera A	0	0	1	0	—		—		1	0
Cúcuta Deportivo	2011	Categoría Primera A	5	0	0	0	—		—		5	0
Cortuluá	2012	Categoría Primera B	22	4	5	0	—		—		27	4
Cortuluá	2013	Categoría Primera B	11	4	4	2	—		—		15	6
Cortuluá	Total		33	8	9	2	—		—		42	10
La Equidad	2013	Categoría Primera A	2	4	0	0	0	0	—		2	4
Livorno (loan)	2013–14	Serie A	8	0	0	0	—		—		8	0
Olimpo (loan)	2014	Argentine Primera División	16	3	0	0	—		—		16	3
Santa Fe	2015	Categoría Primera A	33	10	5	0	11 (Note: Four appearances in Copa Libertadores, seven appearances in Copa Sudamericana)	0	—		49	10
Cortuluá	2016	Categoría Primera A	21	19	3	3	—		—		24	22
Atlético Nacional	2016	Categoría Primera A	7	1	6	5	12 (Note: Four appearances and five goals in Copa Libertadores, eight appearances and six goals in Copa Sudamericana)	11	2 (Note: Appearance(s) in FIFA Club World Cup)	0	27	17
Palmeiras	2017	Série A	24	6	4	0	7 (Note: Appearance(s) in Copa Libertadores)	0	8 (Note: Appearance(s) in Campeonato Paulista)	4	43	10
Palmeiras	2018	Série A	16	3	4	1	12	9	12	7	44	20
Palmeiras	2019	Série A	9	1	1	0	5	2	10	3	25	6
Palmeiras	Total		49	10	9	1	24	11	30	14	112	36
Junior (loan)	2020	Categoría Primera A	23	14	1	1	11 (Note: Five appearances and one goal in Copa Libertadores, six appearances and four goals in Copa Sudamericana)	5	2 (Note: Appearance(s) in Superliga Colombiana)	1	37	21
Junior (loan)	2021	Categoría Primera A	14	8	0	0	8	6	—		22	14
Junior (loan)	Total		37	22	1	1	19	11	2	1	59	35
Grêmio (loan)	2021	Série A	14	5	2	0	—		—		16	5
Junior	2022	Categoría Primera A	17	10	2	1	8 (Note: Appearance(s) in Copa Sudamericana)	5	—		27	16
River Plate	2022	Argentine Primera División	18	9	2	0	0	0	—		20	9
River Plate	2023	Argentine Primera División	33	11	2	1	4	1	2 (Note: Appearance in Supercopa Argentina)	1	41	14
River Plate	2024	Argentine Primera División	35	24	2	1	11	6	1	0	49	31
River Plate	2025	Argentine Primera División	31	7	5	0	9	1	4 (Note: One appearance in Supercopa Internacional, three appearances in FIFA Club World Cup)	0	49	8
River Plate	Total		117	51	11	2	24	8	7	1	159	62
Al Wasl	2025–26	UAE Pro League	13	5	0	0	3 (Note: Appearance(s) in AFC Champions League Two)	3	—		16	8
América	2026–27	Liga MX	2	3	—		—		—		2	3
Career total			374	151	49	15	101	49	39	16	564	231

=== International ===
As of match played 14 July 2024

Appearances and goals by national team and year
National team	Year	Apps	Goals
Colombia	2016	1	0
Colombia	2017	4	2
Colombia	2018	5	1
Colombia	2021	13	4
Colombia	2022	4	1
Colombia	2024	3	1
Total		30	9

Scores and results list Colombia's goal tally first.

List of international goals scored by Miguel Borja
No.	Date	Venue	Opponent	Score	Result	Competition
1	14 November 2017	Chongqing Olympic Sports Center, Chongqing, China	China	3–0	4–0	Friendly
2	14 November 2017	Chongqing Olympic Sports Center, Chongqing, China	China	4–0	4–0	Friendly
3	11 October 2018	Raymond James Stadium, Tampa, United States	United States	4–2	4–2	Friendly
4	8 June 2021	Estadio Metropolitano Roberto Meléndez, Barranquilla, Colombia	Argentina	2–2	2–2	2022 FIFA World Cup qualification
5	20 June 2021	Estádio Olímpico Pedro Ludovico, Goiânia, Brazil	Peru	1–1	1–2	2021 Copa América
6	9 September 2021	Estadio Metropolitano Roberto Meléndez, Barranquilla, Colombia	Chile	1–0	3–1	2022 FIFA World Cup qualification
7	9 September 2021	Estadio Metropolitano Roberto Meléndez, Barranquilla, Colombia	Chile	2–0	3–1	2022 FIFA World Cup qualification
8	24 March 2022	Estadio Metropolitano Roberto Meléndez, Barranquilla, Colombia	Bolivia	2–0	3–0	2022 FIFA World Cup qualification
9	6 July 2024	State Farm Stadium, Glendale, United States	Panama	5–0	5–0	2024 Copa América

== Honours ==
Independiente Santa Fe

- Superliga Colombiana: 2015
- Copa Sudamericana: 2015

Atlético Nacional

- Copa Colombia: 2016
- Copa Libertadores: 2016

Palmeiras

- Campeonato Brasileiro Série A: 2018

Junior

- Superliga Colombiana: 2020

River Plate

- Argentine Primera División: 2023
- Supercopa Argentina: 2023
- Trofeo de Campeones de la Liga Profesional: 2023

Colombia U20

- South American Youth Championship: 2013

Colombia

- Copa América runner-up: 2024; third place: 2021

Individual

- South American Footballer of the Year: 2016
- South American Team of The year: 2016
- Copa Colombia Top Scorer: 2016
- Copa Sudamericana Top Scorer: 2016
- Categoría Primera A Top Scorer: 2016 Apertura, 2020
- Campeonato Paulista top scorer: 2018
- Campeonato Paulista Team of the Year: 2018
- Copa Libertadores Top Scorer: 2018
- Copa de la Liga Profesional Top Scorer: 2024

== Sponsors ==
Miguel Borja is the Brand Ambassador for Binomo in LATAM from October to December 2024.
