= Emerson (footballer, born August 1980) =

Brazilian footballer

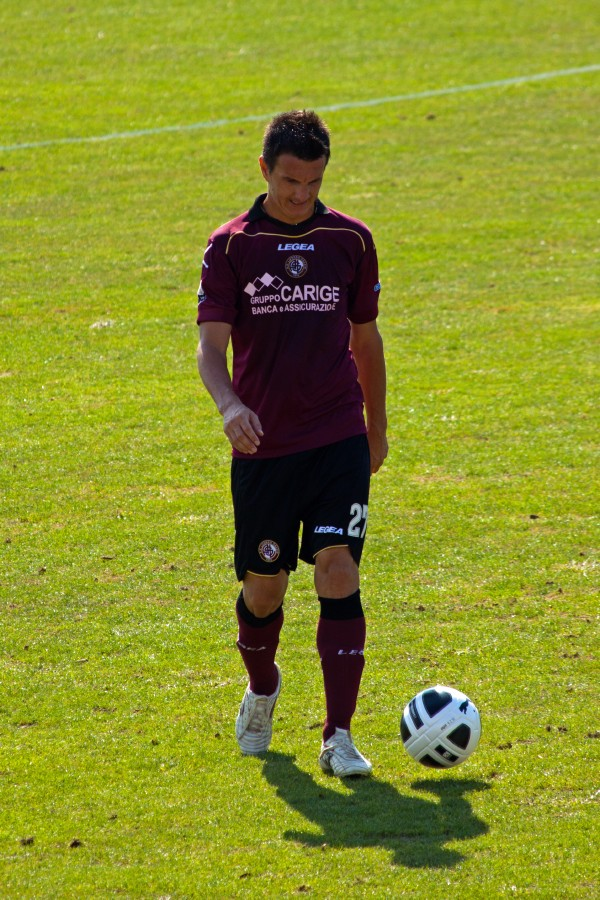

Personal information
- Full name: Emerson Ramos Borges
- Date of birth: 16 August 1980 (age 46)
- Place of birth: Joinville, Brazil
- Height: 1.87 m (6 ft 2 in)
- Position: Centre back

Team information
- Current team: Nuorese

Youth career
- Joinville

Senior career*
Years	Team	Apps	(Gls)
2001–2002	Caxias	12	(3)
2002–2003	Jalesense	25	(13)
2003–2004	Atletico Calcio	20	(3)
2004–2008	Nuorese	96	(28)
2008	Taranto	11	(3)
2008–2011	Lumezzane	88	(7)
2011–2012	Reggina	38	(2)
2012–2016	Livorno	118	(7)
2016–2017	Padova	38	(1)
2017–2018	FeralpiSalò	28	(0)
2018–2020	Potenza	63	(8)
2020–2023	Olbia	97	(6)
2023	Budoni	0	(0)
2023–	Nuorese	?	(?)
- * Club domestic league appearances and goals as of 23 April 2023

Emerson Ramos Borges (born 16 August 1980), known as just Emerson, is a Brazilian footballer who plays as a defender for Italian Promozione Sardinia club Nuorese.

== Career ==
Born in Pirabeiraba, Joinville, Santa Catarina, Emerson started his professional career with Caxias.

In 2003, he left for Italy. As he was not a European Union citizen, Emerson only able to play for amateur side, starting at Atletico Calcio of Serie D

=== Nuorese ===
Emerson next joined Nuorese of Eccellenza Sardinia. He won twice promotion for the Sardinian side, which followed the team being promoted to Serie C2 in 2006, which also made Emerson registered as a professional player and able to sign by any Italian professional club, as FIGC only forbidden clubs signing non-EU players from abroad and from amateur league, except Serie A clubs had one conditional quota (for replacing non-EU players that sold abroad or released). Emerson benefited from the clause that Serie D clubs, which were promoted to Serie C2, could hire amateur non-EU players in the previous season as professional players. Emerson then scored nine league goals for Nuorese in the professional league in 1 1/2 seasons before he left the club in January 2008.

=== Taranto ===
In January 2008, Emerson was transferred to Serie C1 side Taranto Sport in co-ownership deal. He made 11 appearances in the Italian 3rd highest level. Taranto bought him outright by making a higher bid in a closed tender between the two clubs.

=== Lumezzane ===
In July 2008, Emerson was loaned to Lumezzane of Prima Divisione Group A from Taranto (Group B), which became a co-ownership deal later. He was the regular starter of the team and scored five goals in 2009–10 Lega Pro Prima Divisione.

On 25 June 2010, Lumezzane failed to agree a price for the remain 50% registration rights, thus the clubs submitted their bid in envelope to buy the rights from the opposite side (i.e. a closed tender). On 30 June, the envelopes opened in Lega Pro headquarter, and Lumezzane made a higher bid to buy Emerson outright.

On 13 July 2010, he signed a new three-year contract with Lumezzane.

=== Reggina ===
On 18 August 2011, he signed with Serie B club Reggina.

=== Livorno ===
On 21 August 2012, he moved to Livorno on a free transfer. He scored his first goal in Serie A with a "stinging drive from 30 yards (27 m)" in a 3–3 draw with Torino on 30 October 2013, describing it as "absolutely the best goal of my career", then produced arguably a better one against Cagliari the following February: "collecting possession 40 metres from goal, [he] shifted the ball out of his feet and smashed an unstoppable left-footed effort into the top corner".

=== Later years: back to Sardinia and amateur football ===
On 18 August 2020 he joined Olbia.

In July 2023, Emerson signed for Sardinian Serie D club Budoni; he left the club just a month later to return to Nuorese, this time in the regional amateur Promozione league.

== Honours ==
- Serie D: 2006
- Eccellenza Sardinia: 2005
