= Jürgen Prutsch =

Austrian footballer

Personal information
- Date of birth: 22 September 1989 (age 37)
- Place of birth: Graz, Austria
- Height: 1.80 m (5 ft 11 in)
- Position: Midfielder

Team information
- Current team: Barletta

Senior career*
| Years | Team | Apps | (Gls) |
| 2006–2007 | Grazer AK | 1 | (0) |
| 2007–2009 | SK Sturm Graz | 1 | (0) |
| 2009 | → SC Rheindorf Altach (loan) | 16 | (0) |
| 2010– | Livorno | 21 | (0) |
| 2013– | → Barletta (loan) | 5 | (0) |
- * Club domestic league appearances and goals

Jürgen Prutsch (born 22 September 1989 in Graz) is an Austrian professional football player. Currently, he plays for Italian Lega Pro Prima Divisione side Barletta on loan from A.S. Livorno Calcio.

He made his Serie A debut for A.S. Livorno Calcio on 24 March 2010 in a game against F.C. Internazionale Milano.
