= Iacopo Galli =

Italian footballer

Personal information
- Date of birth: 30 September 1993 (age 33)
- Place of birth: Carrara, Italy
- Height: 1.78 m (5 ft 10 in)
- Position: Defender

Youth career
- –2012: Empoli

Senior career*
Years	Team	Apps	(Gls)
2012–2013	Livorno	0	(0)
2012–2013	→ RapalloBogliasco (loan)	14	(0)
2013	→ Lucchese (loan)	14	(0)
2013–2015	Pontedera	44	(2)
2015–2017	Crotone	3	(0)
2016–2017	→ Spezia (loan)	6	(0)
2017	→ Livorno (loan)	14	(2)
2017–2018	Casertana	12	(2)
2018–2019	Rende	2	(0)
- * Club domestic league appearances and goals as of 17 November 2018

Iacopo Galli (born 30 September 1993) is an Italian football player.

== Club career ==
He made his Serie C debut for Pontedera on 29 September 2013 in a game against Benevento.
