= Jonny Mosquera =

Colombian footballer (born 1991)

Personal information
- Full name: Jonny Ferney Mosquera Mena
- Date of birth: 17 February 1991 (age 35)
- Place of birth: Medellín, Colombia
- Height: 1.71 m (5 ft 7 in)
- Position: Defensive midfielder

Youth career
- Envigado

Senior career*
Years	Team	Apps	(Gls)
2009–2016	Envigado	99	(1)
2013–2015	→ Livorno (loan)	21	(0)
2016–2018	América de Cali	62	(0)
2019	Avaí	11	(0)
2020	Rionegro Águilas	9	(0)

International career
2011	Colombia U20	1	(0)
- * Club domestic league appearances and goals as of 18:06, 17 January 2021 (UTC)

Jonny Ferney Mosquera Mena (born 17 February 1991) is a Colombian footballer who plays as a defensive midfielder.

== Honours ==
=== Club ===
Avaí

- Campeonato Catarinense: 2019

=== International ===
Colombia U20

- Toulon Tournament: 2011
