= AS Atletico Calcio =

Defunct Italian association football club

Associazione Sportiva Atletico Calcio was an Italian football club based in Cagliari and Villasor, Sardinia. It was founded in 1963. The club folded in 2008.

== History ==
Associazione Sportiva Atletico Calcio was founded in 1963 as Atletico Cagliari and was renamed before Atletico Sirio in 1996 and again Atletico Elmas in 1998. Only in the summer 2002 it was renamed with the last denomination.

The team has played 10 seasons in Serie D: from 1996–97 to 1999-2000 and from 2001–02 to 2006-07 when it was relegated to Eccellenza.

In the summer 2008, after its 11th place in Eccellenza Sardinia, Atletico Elmas merged with Decimese Aurora & Decimo founding A.S.D. Atletico Decimomannu and so it was dissolved.

=== Colors and badge ===
Its colors were white, yellow and green.

=== Stadium ===
It played at the Stadio San Biagio Villasor in Villasor, which has a capacity of 1,200.

== From 2008 to the present day ==
After two seasons from 2008 to 2010 in Eccellenza Sardinia, in the summer 2010 A.S.D. Atletico Decimomannu was merged with Polisportiva Elmas Elmas (club of Prima Categoria Sardinia) founding A.S.D. Atletico Elmas.

In the summer 2012, after a 15th place, it didn't join 2012-13 Eccellenza and was relegated to Promozione.
