= Antonio Meola =

Italian footballer (born 1990)

Personal information
- Date of birth: 8 May 1990 (age 36)
- Place of birth: Naples, Italy
- Height: 1.81 m (5 ft 11 1/2 in)
- Position: Right back

Team information
- Current team: Chieti

Youth career
- Lucca
- 2009–2011: Avellino

Senior career*
Years	Team	Apps	(Gls)
2011–2015	Livorno	19	(1)
2013	→ Lumezzane (loan)	8	(0)
2013–2014	→ Paganese (loan)	16	(0)
2014–2015	→ Crotone (loan)	0	(0)
2015–2017	Matera	29	(1)
2018–2019	Casertana	39	(1)
2019–	Chieti	14	(0)
- * Club domestic league appearances and goals as of 21:45, 29 March 2020 (UTC)

Antonio Meola (born 8 May 1990) is an Italian professional footballer who plays as a right back for Serie D club Chieti.

== Career ==
Born in Naples, Meola made his professional debut for Livorno during the 2011–12 season. He previously played for Lucca and Avellino.

On 21 November 2019, Meola joined Chieti.
