= Luca Siligardi =

Italian footballer (born 1988)

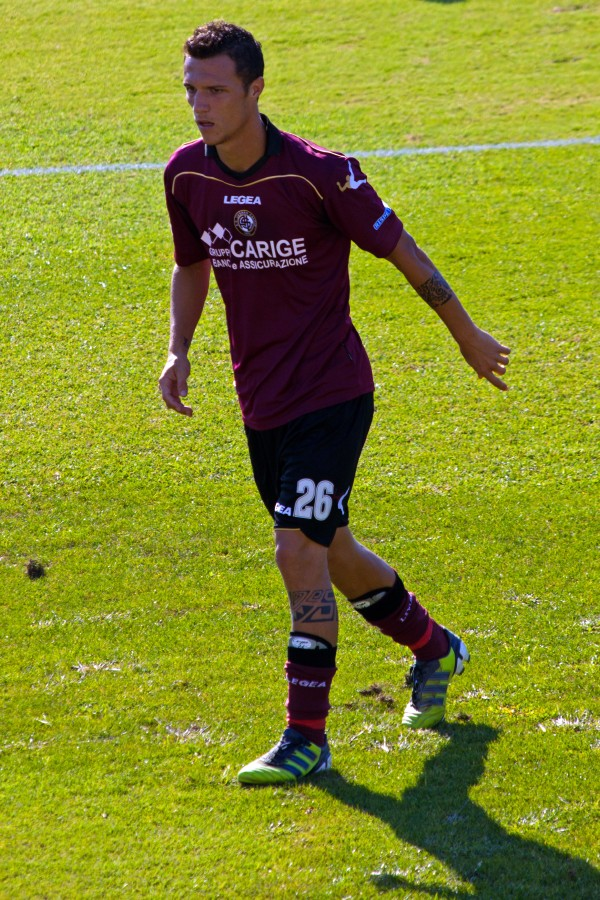
- Siligardi with Livorno in August 2012

Personal information
- Date of birth: 26 January 1988 (age 38)
- Place of birth: Correggio, Italy
- Height: 1.80 m (5 ft 11 in)
- Position: Attacking midfielder

Youth career
- 1994–2001: Campagnola
- 2001–2002: Riese
- 2002–2004: Dorando Pietri
- 2004–2005: Parma
- 2005–2006: Dorando Pietri
- 2006–2007: Inter

Senior career*
Years	Team	Apps	(Gls)
2008–2011	Inter	0	(0)
2008–2009	→ Bari (loan)	5	(0)
2009	→ Piacenza (loan)	3	(1)
2009–2010	→ Triestina (loan)	22	(4)
2010–2011	→ Bologna (loan)	12	(0)
2011–2015	Livorno	100	(31)
2015–2017	Verona	59	(7)
2017–2022	Parma	61	(2)
2020–2021	→ Crotone (loan)	4	(0)
2021	→ Reggiana (loan)	9	(0)
2022–2023	Feralpisalò	37	(7)
2023–2024	SPAL	14	(1)
- * Club domestic league appearances and goals as of 4 May 2024

Luca Siligardi (born 26 January 1988) is an Italian professional footballer who plays as an attacking midfielder.

== Club career ==
A native from the province of Reggio Emilia, he started his career at regional team likes Campagnola and Riese, and Dorando Pietri in the province of Modena. He joined one of the most famous club in Emilia-Romagna, Parma F.C. for one season, before returned to Dorando Pietri and played in Eccellenza.

In summer 2006, he joined Inter, and made his first team debut on 17 January 2008, a Coppa Italia match that won Reggina 3–0. In that match, he replaced Dejan Stanković in half time. He played another against S.S. Lazio, a semi-final first leg of Coppa Italia, on 16 April 2008.

Siligardi renewed his contract with Inter until 30 June 2012 and completed two loan moves to Bari and Piacenza for the 2008–09 Serie B season, spending the first half at Bari and the second at Piacenza. On 13 July 2009, Siligardi was loaned to Triestina for the 2009–10 Serie B season. On 16 July 2010, Siligardi was loaned to Bologna for the 2010–11 Serie A season, for €550,000, with option to buy outright for €500,000, with counter-option of €600,000. He signed a contract worth €150,000 annually in net. In June 2011 Bologna excised the rights but Inter activated the counter-option, made Bologna received €50,000 in net as a bonus within a season in order to lent a place for Siligardi.

=== Livorno ===
In summer 2011, Simone Dell'Agnello and Siligardi were sold to Livorno as part of Francesco Bardi's deal. Both clubs also retained 50% registration rights of the players. Siligardi signed a four-year contract. In June 2012 Inter acquired Bardi outright, as well as Livorno acquired Dell'Agnello and Siligardi outright.

=== Verona ===
On 2 July 2015, Siligardi was signed by Hellas Verona.

=== Parma ===
He signed for Parma on 15 July 2017.

On 5 October 2020, Siligardi joined Crotone on loan. On 1 February 2021, he moved on loan to Reggiana.

=== Feralpisalò ===
On 29 January 2022, he moved to Feralpisalò.

=== SPAL ===
On 28 July 2023, Siligardi signed a one-season contract with SPAL.
