= Bryan Gioè =

Italian footballer (born 1993)

Personal information
- Date of birth: 6 July 1993 (age 33)
- Place of birth: Lucca, Italy
- Height: 1.81 m (5 ft 11 in)
- Position: Forward

Team information
- Current team: Adriese
- Number: 9

Youth career
- Livorno

Senior career*
Years	Team	Apps	(Gls)
2012–2013	Livorno	0	(0)
2013	→ Pavia (loan)	2	(0)
2013–2014	Grosseto	7	(1)
2014–2015	Tuttocuoio	30	(4)
2015–2016	Pontedera	17	(0)
2016–2017	Pinerolo	34	(16)
2017	Matelica	14	(2)
2017–2018	Massese	19	(7)
2018–2019	Caratese	33	(22)
2019	Giana Erminio	14	(0)
2020	Arezzo	3	(0)
2020–2021	Clodiense	26	(8)
2021-2024	Adriese	77	(39)
2024-2025	Treviso	40	(7)
2025-	Prato	17	(9)
- * Club domestic league appearances and goals as of 30 December 2025

Bryan Gioè (born 6 July 1993) is an Italian footballer who plays as a forward for Ac Prato in Serie D.

== Career ==
=== Giana Erminio ===
On 7 December 2019, Gioè's contract with Giana Erminio was terminated by mutual consent.
