= Paulinho (footballer, born January 1986) =

Brazilian footballer

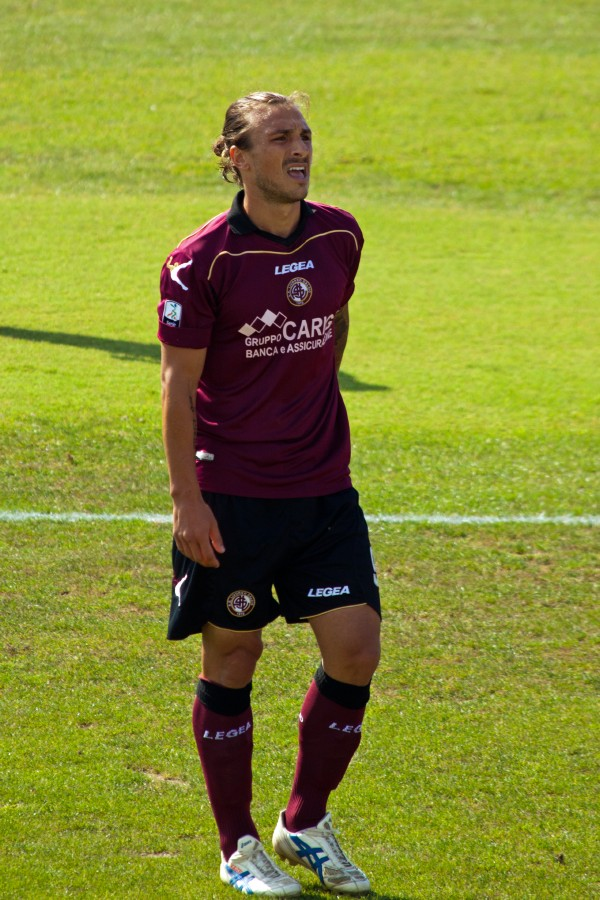
- Paulinho playing for Livorno in 2012

Personal information
- Full name: Paulo Sérgio Betanin
- Date of birth: 10 January 1986 (age 40)
- Place of birth: Caxias do Sul, Brazil
- Height: 1.76 m (5 ft 9 in)
- Position: Forward

Youth career
- Juventude

Senior career*
Years	Team	Apps	(Gls)
2004–2005	Juventude	9	(0)
2005–2014	Livorno	163	(52)
2007–2008	→ Grosseto (loan)	31	(2)
2009–2011	→ Sorrento (loan)	62	(39)
2014–2017	Al-Arabi	57	(24)
2017–2019	Cremonese	26	(7)

International career
?–2005	Brazil U-20	4	(1)
- * Club domestic league appearances and goals as of 26 December 2018

Paulo Sérgio Betanin (born 10 January 1986), more commonly known as Paulinho, is a Brazilian former professional footballer who played as a forward. He also holds an Italian passport through Venetian descent.

== Club career ==
Paulinho started his career at Esporte Clube Juventude. He was signed by Livorno on loan in January 2005. He made his Serie A debut on 17 April 2005 against Fiorentina.

In 2007–08 season he left for Serie B side Grosseto and in 2009–10 season left for Sorrento. His loan was extended in July 2010. With Livorno, he won promotion to Serie A in 2009, only a year after the team had been relegated from the same division. Livrono promoted back to Serie A in 2013. However, the club relegated again in 2014.

In 2014 Paulinho was sold to Al-Arabi for €8 million (€7.6 million to Livorno and €400,000 as solidarity contribution.)

On 23 August 2017, Paulinho returned to Italy for Cremonese. On 1 February 2019, he was released from his Cremonese contract by mutual consent.

== International career ==
Paulinho was capped for the Brazilian under-20 team at the 2005 South American Youth Championship. He played four matches and scored once.

== Career statistics ==
As of match played on 28 September 2021

Appearances and goals by club, season and competition
Club	Season	League			Cup		Other		Total	
Club	Season	Division	Apps	Goals	Apps	Goals	Apps	Goals	Apps	Goals
Livorno	2005–06	Serie A	11	0	0	0	0	0	11	0
Livorno	2006–07	Serie A	20	2	0	0	0	0	20	2
Livorno	2008–09	Serie B	14	0	0	0	0	0	14	0
Livorno	2011–12	Serie B	38	13	2	2	0	0	40	15
Livorno	2012–13	Serie B	45	22	2	0	0	0	47	22
Livorno	2013–14	Serie A	35	15	1	0	0	0	36	15
Livorno	Total		163	52	5	2	0	0	168	54
Grosseto (loan)	2007–08	Serie B	31	2	0	0	0	0	31	2
Sorrento (loan)	2009–10	Lega Pro Prima Divisione	33	15	0	0	0	0	33	15
Sorrento (loan)	2010–11	Lega Pro Prima Divisione	29	24	2	1	0	0	31	25
Sorrento (loan)	Total		62	39	2	1	0	0	64	40
Al-Arabi	2014–15	Qatar Stars League	23	11	0	0	0	0	23	11
Al-Arabi	2015–16	Qatar Stars League	20	12	0	0	0	0	20	12
Al-Arabi	2016–17	Qatar Stars League	14	1	0	0	0	0	14	1
Al-Arabi	Total		57	24	0	0	0	0	57	24
Cremonese	2017–18	Serie B	16	5	0	0	0	0	16	5
Cremonese	2017–18	Serie B	10	2	0	0	0	0	10	2
Cremonese	Total		26	7	0	0	0	0	26	7
Career total			339	124	7	3	0	0	346	127
