= Leandro Greco =

Italian footballer

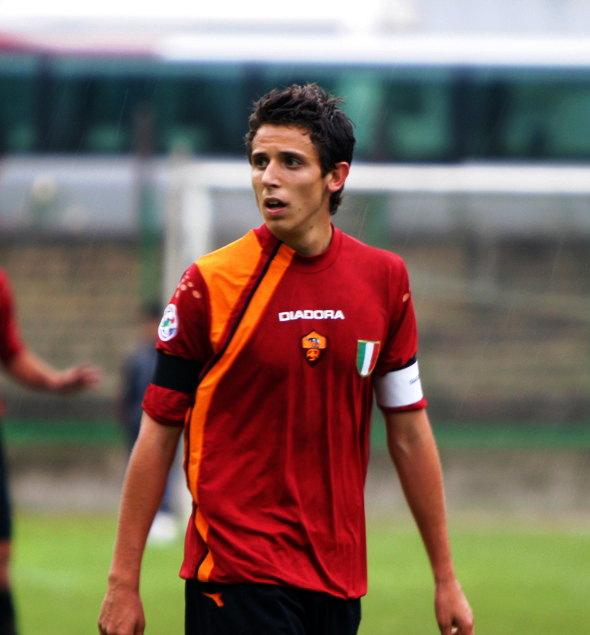
- Greco in 2005

Personal information
- Date of birth: 19 July 1986 (age 40)
- Place of birth: Rome, Italy
- Height: 1.84 m (6 ft 1/2 in)
- Position: Midfielder

Team information
- Current team: Crotone (head coach)

Youth career
- 2002–2003: Roma

Senior career*
Years	Team	Apps	(Gls)
2003–2012	Roma	37	(0)
2003–2004	→ Astrea (loan)	18	(1)
2006–2008	→ Verona (loan)	41	(3)
2009–2010	→ Pisa (loan)	8	(0)
2010–2011	→ Piacenza (loan)	22	(0)
2012–2013	Olympiacos	24	(0)
2013–2014	Livorno	32	(4)
2014–2015	Genoa	7	(0)
2015	→ Hellas Verona (loan)	18	(0)
2015–2017	Hellas Verona	27	(1)
2017–2018	Bari	8	(0)
2018	→ Foggia (loan)	17	(0)
2018–2019	Cremonese	10	(0)
2019	Foggia	16	(2)
2019–2020	Cosenza	9	(0)
2020	Perugia	4	(0)
2020–2021	Südtirol	33	(0)

Managerial career
- 2022: Südtirol (caretaker)
- 2023–2024: Olbia
- 2024–2025: Frosinone
- 2025: Pro Patria
- 2026–: Crotone
- * Club domestic league appearances and goals

Leandro Greco (born 19 July 1986) is an Italian football coach and a former player who played as a midfielder who is the head coach of Serie C Group C club Crotone.

== Career ==
A midfielder, Greco was a regular in the Roma youth squad. He made his Serie A debut for AS Roma in 2004–05. In the 2005–06 season, Greco made only a handful of appearances, all as a substitute player.

=== Verona, Pisa & Piacenza ===
He was farmed to Hellas Verona for the following two seasons, playing a total of 40 games (26 in his first season, 14 in his second). Verona acquired half of the registration rights in June 2007 for €300,000, but bought back by Roma in June 2008 for just €150,000.

He played the second half of 2008–09 on loan to Pisa of Serie B. His loan stint was cut short in January 2010, and Greco was successively sent to another Serie B club, Piacenza, for the remainder of the season.

=== Return to Roma ===
Greco returned to Roma for the 2010–11 season and was immediately put on transfer list, but no club showed interest in signing him, so he was placed on the first team instead. An injury crisis head coach Claudio Ranieri to bring him on the bench for a UEFA Champions League game against FC Basel, during which Greco entered as a substitute for the final 15 minutes and scored a goal only one minute after entering; the game ended in a 3–2 win for Roma. Greco's good performances led Ranieri to call him up for the Rome derby, during which he came on for injured Jérémy Menez during the first half and provided a solid performance in a 2–0 win for his side. He was promoted to the starting lineup for subsequent games against Fiorentina and Juventus.

Greco's contract was extended along with Daniele De Rossi and Simone Perrotta in February 2012. Greco signed a new 3-year contract with an annual gross salary of €1.254 million plus bonuses. Moreover, the 2011–12 season gross salary also increased to €0.8 million.

At the start of 2012–13 Serie A, Greco was included in the pre-season camp, however he trained separately due to minor injury.

=== Olympiacos ===
In July 2012, Greek champions Olympiacos signed Greco for three years on a free transfer. He scored his first goal for the Piraeus side in the Champions League game against Montpellier HSC in a 3–1 home win.

=== Livorno ===
In July 2013, Greco returned to Italy for Livorno. On 20 June 2014, his contract with Livorno was terminated in mutual consent.

=== Genoa ===
On 20 June 2014, Leandro Greco signed a three-year contract with the Serie A team Genoa.

=== Cremonese ===
On 6 July 2018, Greco signed a two-year contract with Serie B club Cremonese.

=== Foggia ===
On 18 January 2019, Greco joined Foggia Calcio for a fee.

=== Cosenza and Perugia ===
On 31 August 2019, he joined Cosenza on a 1-year contract. On 31 January 2020, he signed with Perugia until the end of the season.

=== Südtirol ===
On 31 July 2020, he signed a 2-year contract with Südtirol.

== Coaching career ==
After retirement, Greco stayed on at Südtirol as an assistant coach. On 9 August 2022, he was appointed caretaker following the departure of Lamberto Zauli as head coach.

After being in charge of Südtirol for the first three games of the Serie B season, all ended in defeat; on 29 August 2022, Greco was ultimately relieved from his first team duties and replaced by Pierpaolo Bisoli.

On 9 June 2023, he signed a two-year contract to become head coach of Olbia. He was dismissed on 22 January 2024, leaving Olbia in the relegation zone.

On 9 August 2024, Greco was unveiled as the new Under-19 coach of Frosinone. On 22 October 2024, following the dismissal of Vincenzo Vivarini after a negative start of the season with the team bottom of the league, Greco was promoted to head coach. On 17 February 2025, Greco was relieved of his duties.

He successively served as head coach of Serie C club Pro Patria from July to December 2025.

== Honours ==
Olympiacos

- Super League Greece (1): 2012–13
