= Luca Pagliarulo =

Italian footballer

Personal information
- Full name: Luca Pagliarulo
- Date of birth: 6 September 1983 (age 43)
- Place of birth: Foggia, Italy
- Height: 1.84 m (6 ft 1/2 in)
- Position: Defender

Team information
- Current team: Dattilo

Senior career*
| Years | Team | Apps | (Gls) |
| 2002–2003 | Termoli | 31 | (0) |
| 2003–2004 | Brescello | 14 | (0) |
| 2004 | Orbassano | 18 | (1) |
| 2004–2007 | Foggia | 63 | (0) |
| 2007–2008 | Manfredonia | 32 | (0) |
| 2008–2010 | Canavese | 53 | (0) |
| 2010–2020 | Trapani | 297 | (22) |
| 2020– | Dattilo | 0 | (0) |
- * Club domestic league appearances and goals as of 30 June 2020

Luca Pagliarulo (born 6 September 1983 in Foggia) is an Italian footballer. He currently plays for Serie D team Dattilo, and is mostly known for having played for Trapani Calcio between 2010 and 2020.
