= 2013–14 in Italian football =

Football in Italy
- Season: 2013–14

Men's football
- Serie A: Juventus
- Serie B: Palermo
- Coppa Italia: Napoli
- Supercoppa Italiana: Juventus

The 2013–14 season was the 112th season of competitive football in Italy.

== Promotions and relegations (pre-season) ==
Teams promoted to Serie A

- Sassuolo
- Hellas Verona
- Livorno

Teams relegated from Serie A

- Pescara
- Siena
- Palermo

Teams promoted to Serie B

- Trapani
- Carpi
- Latina
- Avellino

Teams relegated from Serie B

- Vicenza
- Ascoli
- Pro Vercelli
- Grosseto

== League tables ==
=== Serie A ===
Pos	Team	Pld	W	D	L	GF	GA	GD	Pts	Qualification or relegation
1	Juventus (C)	38	33	3	2	80	23	+57	102	Qualification for the Champions League group stage
2	Roma	38	26	7	5	72	25	+47	85	Qualification for the Champions League group stage
3	Napoli	38	23	9	6	77	39	+38	78	Qualification for the Champions League play-off round
4	Fiorentina	38	19	8	11	65	44	+21	65	Qualification for the Europa League group stage (Note: Since the 2013–14 Coppa Italia champions Napoli and runners–up Fiorentina qualified for the 2014–15 European football season thus 4th, 5th and 6th in Serie A (barring any failure to receive a "UEFA licence" from the FIGC or a ban from European competition) would qualify for group stage, play-off round and third qualifying round respectively.)
5	Internazionale	38	15	15	8	62	39	+23	60	Qualification for the Europa League play-off round
6	Parma	38	15	13	10	58	46	+12	58	
7	Torino	38	15	12	11	58	48	+10	57 (Note: Torino finished ahead of Milan on goal difference : Torino 2-2 Milan, Milan 1-1 Torino; Torino = +10, Milan = +8.)	Qualification for the Europa League third qualifying round (Note: The FIGC rejected the application of Parma for a UEFA license, because Parma had overdue tax debt; their place went to seventh-place Torino, which had a UEFA license.)
8	Milan	38	16	9	13	57	49	+8	57	
9	Lazio	38	15	11	12	54	54	0	56	
10	Hellas Verona	38	16	6	16	62	68	−6	54	
11	Atalanta	38	15	5	18	43	51	−8	50	
12	Sampdoria	38	12	9	17	48	62	−14	45	
13	Udinese	38	12	8	18	46	57	−11	44 (Note: Udinese finished ahead of Genoa on head-to-head away goals scored: Udinese 1-0 Genoa, Udinese 3-3 Genoa.)	
14	Genoa	38	11	11	16	41	50	−9	44	
15	Cagliari	38	9	12	17	34	53	−19	39	
16	Chievo	38	10	6	22	34	54	−20	36	
17	Sassuolo	38	9	7	22	43	72	−29	34	
18	Catania (R)	38	8	8	22	34	66	−32	32	Relegation to Serie B
19	Bologna (R)	38	5	14	19	28	58	−30	29	Relegation to Serie B
20	Livorno (R)	38	6	7	25	39	77	−38	25	Relegation to Serie B

Source: Serie A, Soccerway
Rules for classification: 1st points; 2nd head-to-head points; 3rd head-to-head goal difference; 4th goal difference; 5th number of goals scored; 6th public draw.
(Head-to-head record is applied for clubs with the same number of points only once all matches between said clubs have been played)
(C) Champions; (R) Relegated

=== Serie B ===
Pos	Team	Pld	W	D	L	GF	GA	GD	Pts	Promotion or relegation
1	Palermo (C, P)	42	25	11	6	62	28	+34	86	Promotion to Serie A
2	Empoli (P)	42	20	12	10	59	35	+24	72	Promotion to Serie A
3	Latina	42	18	14	10	44	36	+8	68	Qualification to promotion play-offs semi-finals
4	Cesena (O, P)	42	17	15	10	45	35	+10	66	Qualification to promotion play-offs semi-finals
5	Modena	42	16	16	10	65	43	+22	64	Qualification to promotion play-offs preliminary round
6	Crotone	42	17	12	13	56	52	+4	63 (Note: BAR 1-2 CRO; CRO 0-0 BAR)	Qualification to promotion play-offs preliminary round
7	Bari (Note: Bari was docked 3 points due to the 2011 Italian football scandal and 1 point for financial irregularities.)	42	19	10	13	52	43	+9	63	Qualification to promotion play-offs preliminary round
8	Spezia	42	16	14	12	46	48	−2	62	Qualification to promotion play-offs preliminary round
9	Siena (Note: Siena was docked 8 points for financial irregularities; subsequently not admitted for next season.) (D, E, R, R)	42	18	15	9	57	41	+16	61	Revival in Serie D
10	Virtus Lanciano	42	15	15	12	44	45	−1	60	
11	Avellino	42	15	14	13	48	45	+3	59 (Note: AVE: 7 pts ; CAR: 5 pts ; BRE: 4 pts)	
12	Carpi	42	16	11	15	50	49	+1	59	
13	Brescia	42	15	14	13	56	53	+3	59	
14	Trapani	42	14	15	13	58	54	+4	57	
15	Pescara	42	13	13	16	50	53	−3	52	
16	Ternana	42	12	15	15	54	56	−2	51	
17	Cittadella	42	11	14	17	42	49	−7	47 (Note: VAR 2-1 CIT; CIT 5-1 VAR)	
18	Varese	42	12	11	19	51	63	−12	47	Qualification for relegation playoff
19	Novara (R)	42	10	14	18	40	58	−18	44	Qualification for relegation playoff
20	Padova (Note: Padova went bankrupt and folded.) (R, E, R, D)	42	10	11	21	45	63	−18	41	Revival in Serie D
21	Reggina (Note: Reggina was docked 3 points for financial irregularities.) (R)	42	6	11	25	38	70	−32	26	Relegation to Lega Pro
22	Juve Stabia (R)	42	2	13	27	37	80	−43	19	Relegation to Lega Pro

Source: Lega Serie B
Rules for classification: 1) points; 2) head-to-head points; 3) head-to-head goal difference; 4) head-to-head goals scored; 5) goal difference; 6) number of goals scored.
(C) Champions; (D) Disqualified; (E) Eliminated; (O) Play-off winners; (P) Promoted; (R) Relegated
