= Andrea Luci =

Italian footballer (born 1985)

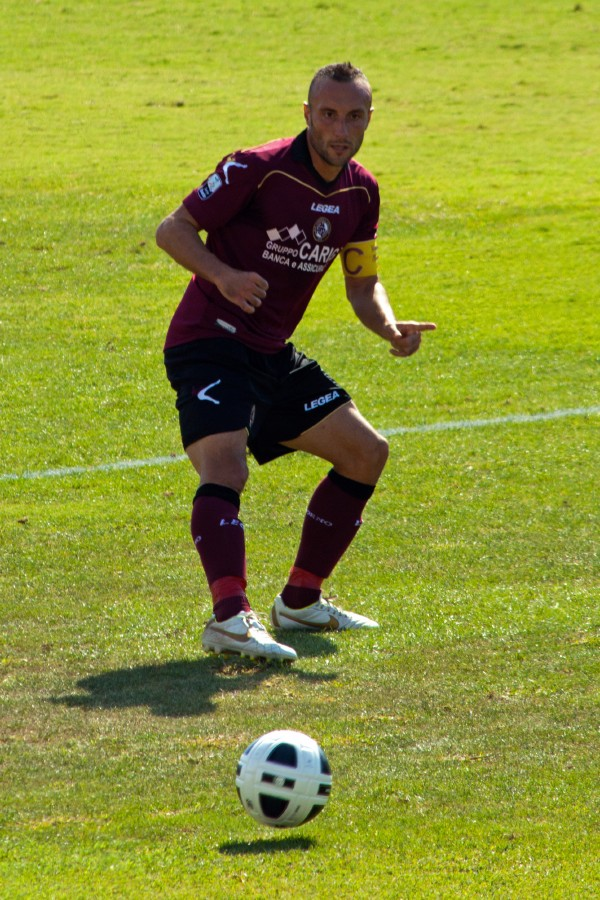

Personal information
- Date of birth: 30 March 1985 (age 41)
- Place of birth: Piombino, Italy
- Height: 1.72 m (5 ft 8 in)
- Position: Midfielder

Youth career
- Fiorentina
- Juventus

Senior career*
Years	Team	Apps	(Gls)
2005–2007	Juventus	0	(0)
2005–2006	→ Torres (loan)	22	(2)
2006–2007	→ Pescara (loan)	32	(1)
2007–2010	Ascoli	91	(3)
2010–2020	Livorno	317	(13)
2020–2021	Carrarese	50	(1)
2021–2025	Livorno	78	(6)
- * Club domestic league appearances and goals

Andrea Luci (born 30 March 1985) is an Italian former footballer who played as a midfielder.

== Club career ==
After his time with the Fiorentina and Juventus youth systems, Luci was loaned out to Sassari Torres 1903 for the 2005–06 season. He was then loaned out to Pescara Calcio, for the 2006–07 Serie B season. After Pescara's relegation to Serie C1, Andrea Luci was again farmed to Serie B side Ascoli Calcio 1898 in a joint-ownership bid. In June 2008 Ascoli bought Luci's remaining 50% rights for €103,000.

In September 2009 Luci signed a new 4-year contract with the club.

On 25 June 2010, a few days before the closure of the 2009–10 financial year, he was sold to fellow Serie B club Livorno.

On 24 September 2020 he signed with Carrarese. On 23 December 2021, his contract with Carrarese was terminated by mutual consent.

On 29 December 2021, he returned to Livorno, now re-organized in the fifth-tier Eccellenza.
