= 2011–12 Udinese Calcio season =

Udinese
2011–12 season
- President: Franco Soldati
- Manager: Francesco Guidolin
- Stadium: Stadio Friuli
- Serie A: 3rd
- Coppa Italia: Round of 16
- UEFA Champions League: Play-off round
- UEFA Europa League: Round of 16
- Top goalscorer: League: Antonio Di Natale (23); All: Antonio Di Natale (29)
- Highest home attendance: 28,588 vs Juventus (21 December 2011, Serie A)
- Lowest home attendance: 5,200 vs Chievo (11 January 2012, Coppa Italia)
- Average home league attendance: 18,595
Home colours	Away colours	Third colours

The 2011–12 season was Udinese Calcio's 17th consecutive and 32nd Serie A season. The club had a successful league season, finishing third in Serie A, but disappointed in the three cup competitions in which it competed. Udinese were eliminated from the Coppa Italia in the round of 16, and also experienced disappointment in the UEFA Champions League, where it was eliminated in the play-off round and thus failed to make its first appearance in the group stage since the 2005–06 season. As a result, Udinese dropped down to the UEFA Europa League, where it successfully advanced from both the group stage and the round of 32, only to be eliminated in the round of 16. Club captain and legend Antonio Di Natale was once again the team's top scorer, with 23 goals in Serie A and 29 in total.

== Season review ==
=== Serie A ===
Udinese were unbeaten in their first seven Serie A games, and only conceded one goal in that period, which was the best defensive record in top European leagues at the time. They were also top of Serie A at the moment, and compared to much more expensive squad of Manchester City, which also top Premier League at the same time.

=== Europe ===
Udinese were drawn against English side Arsenal for qualification into the UEFA Champions League. The first leg was played away at the Emirates Stadium, which resulted in a 1–0 defeat. The second leg was a heavily contested match, with Udinese taking a 1–0 lead at half-time to level the aggregate score to 1–1 but Arsenal caught up in the second half and Udinese lost 2–1, and 3–1 on aggregate. Udinese were then drawn into the Europa League.

== Players ==
=== Squad information ===
Updated 31 August 2011 Note: Flags indicate national team as defined under FIFA eligibility rules; some limited exceptions apply. Players may hold more than one non-FIFA nationality.

No.	Pos.	Nation	Player
1	GK	SLO	Samir Handanović
3	MF	CHI	Mauricio Isla
5	DF	BRA	Danilo
6	GK	ITA	Emanuele Belardi
7	MF	GHA	Emmanuel Agyemang-Badu
8	MF	SRB	Dušan Basta
9	FW	BRA	Barreto
10	FW	ITA	Antonio Di Natale (captain)
11	DF	ITA	Maurizio Domizzi
13	DF	BRA	Neuton
16	DF	ITA	Andrea Coda
17	DF	MAR	Medhi Benatia
20	MF	GHA	Kwadwo Asamoah
21	GK	ITA	Daniele Padelli (on loan from Sampdoria)

No.	Pos.	Nation	Player
22	MF	FRA	Abdoul Sissoko
23	MF	SUI	Almen Abdi
24	DF	SWE	Joel Ekstrand
25	MF	ROU	Gabriel Torje
26	DF	ITA	Giovanni Pasquale
27	DF	COL	Pablo Armero
28	GK	VEN	Rafael Romo
30	MF	CIV	Thierry Doubai (left in January)
31	FW	ITA	Diego Fabbrini
32	DF	ITA	Damiano Ferronetti
37	MF	ARG	Roberto Pereyra
66	MF	ITA	Giampiero Pinzi
83	FW	ITA	Antonio Floro Flores
92	FW	CZE	Matěj Vydra (loan return c. January 2012)

==== Reserve squad ====
The following reserve players received first team shirt number: Note: Flags indicate national team as defined under FIFA eligibility rules; some limited exceptions apply. Players may hold more than one non-FIFA nationality.

No.	Pos.	Nation	Player
18	MF	ITA	Cristian Battocchio

=== UEFA Champions League squad ===
Updated 8 August 2011

The squad consist of a maximum of 17 foreigners, and a minimum of 8 local trained players (must be a minimum of 4 club trained)

Note: Flags indicate national team as defined under FIFA eligibility rules; some limited exceptions apply. Players may hold more than one non-FIFA nationality.

No.	Pos.	Nation	Player
1	GK	SLO	Samir Handanović
3	MF	CHI	Mauricio Isla
5	DF	BRA	Danilo
6	GK	ITA	Emanuele Belardi
7	MF	GHA	Emmanuel Agyemang-Badu
8	MF	SRB	Dušan Basta
10	FW	ITA	Antonio Di Natale (captain)
13	DF	BRA	Neuton
14	DF	ITA	Daniel Bello (List A club product)
17	DF	MAR	Medhi Benatia
19	FW	ARG	Germán Denis
20	MF	GHA	Kwadwo Asamoah
21	FW	CZE	Matěj Vydra (*)

No.	Pos.	Nation	Player
23	MF	SUI	Almen Abdi
24	DF	SWE	Joel Ekstrand
26	DF	ITA	Giovanni Pasquale
27	DF	COL	Pablo Armero
28	GK	VEN	Rafael Romo
30	MF	CIV	Thierry Doubai
31	FW	ITA	Diego Fabbrini
41	DF	ITA	Simone Sbardella (List A club product)
42	MF	ITA	Mattia Bedin (List A club product)
43	FW	ITA	Davide Marsura (List A club product)
66	MF	ITA	Giampiero Pinzi
83	FW	ITA	Antonio Floro Flores

- Note: Matěj Vydra replaced injured Maurizio Domizzi after the deadline

==== List B ====
Note: Flags indicate national team as defined under FIFA eligibility rules; some limited exceptions apply. Players may hold more than one non-FIFA nationality.

No.	Pos.	Nation	Player
18	MF	ITA	Cristian Battocchio
44	GK	ROU	Alin Bucuroiu
45	DF	ITA	Simone Deana
46	MF	ITA	Gianluca Migliorini

No.	Pos.	Nation	Player
47	DF	ITA	Davide Nicoletti
48	MF	ITA	Luca Baldassin
49	DF	ITA	Luca Corrado
50	MF	ITA	Marco Piscopo

=== UEFA Europa League squad ===
Updated 1 February 2012 Note: Flags indicate national team as defined under FIFA eligibility rules; some limited exceptions apply. Players may hold more than one non-FIFA nationality.

No.	Pos.	Nation	Player
1	GK	SLO	Samir Handanović
3	MF	CHI	Mauricio Isla
4	MF	ITA	Michele Pazienza (*)
5	DF	BRA	Danilo
7	MF	GHA	Emmanuel Agyemang-Badu
8	MF	SRB	Dušan Basta
9	FW	BRA	Barreto (**)
10	FW	ITA	Antonio Di Natale (captain)
11	DF	ITA	Maurizio Domizzi
13	DF	BRA	Neuton
14	DF	ITA	Daniel Bello (List A club product)
17	DF	MAR	Medhi Benatia
20	MF	GHA	Kwadwo Asamoah
21	GK	ITA	Daniele Padelli (on loan from Sampdoria)

No.	Pos.	Nation	Player
23	MF	SUI	Almen Abdi
24	DF	SWE	Joel Ekstrand
26	DF	ITA	Giovanni Pasquale (*)
27	DF	COL	Pablo Armero
28	GK	VEN	Rafael Romo
30	MF	CIV	Thierry Doubai (**)
31	FW	ITA	Diego Fabbrini
32	DF	ITA	Damiano Ferronetti (*)
37	MF	ARG	Roberto Pereyra (**)
41	DF	ITA	Simone Sbardella (List A club product)
42	MF	ITA	Mattia Bedin (List A club product)
43	FW	ITA	Davide Marsura (List A club product)
66	MF	ITA	Giampiero Pinzi
83	FW	ITA	Antonio Floro Flores

- Note:

Players marked * indicated that they were inserted the squad in January 2012 Players marked ** indicated that they left the squad in January 2012

==== List B ====
Note: Flags indicate national team as defined under FIFA eligibility rules; some limited exceptions apply. Players may hold more than one non-FIFA nationality.

No.	Pos.	Nation	Player
18	MF	ITA	Cristian Battocchio
45	DF	ITA	Simone Deana
46	MF	ITA	Gianluca Migliorini
48	MF	ITA	Luca Baldassin

No.	Pos.	Nation	Player
49	DF	ITA	Luca Corrado
50	MF	ITA	Marco Piscopo
51	MF	ITA	Riccardo Dimitrio

== Transfers ==
=== Summer 2011 ===
==== In ====
Player	Position	Old Club	Details
Neuton	Defender	Grêmio	€3 million
Željko Brkić	Goalkeeper	Vojvodina	€1.5 million
Abdoul Sissoko	Midfielder	Troyes	€1.5 million
Thierry Doubai	Midfielder	Young Boys	€2.5 million
Barreto	Forward	Bari	€3.5 million
Diego Fabbrini	Midfielder	Empoli	Co-ownership termination
Danilo	Defender	Palmeiras	€2 million
Gabriel Torje	Midfielder	Dinamo București	Undisclosed
Roberto Pereyra	Defender	River Plate	Undisclosed

Total spending: ▼€14 million

==== Out ====
Player	Position	New Club	Details
Simone Pepe	Forward	Juventus	€7.5 million
Marco Motta	Defender	Juventus	€3.75 million
Alexis Sánchez	Forward	Barcelona	€26 million
Gökhan Inler	Midfielder	Napoli	€13 million
Cristián Zapata	Defender	Villarreal	€14 million
Gaetano D'Agostino	Midfielder	Siena	co-ownership €2.5 million
Juan Cuadrado	Defender	Lecce	loan
Fabián Orellana	Defender	Granada	undisclosed
Christian Obodo	Midfielder	Lecce	loan
Germán Denis	Forward	Atalanta	loan

Total sale: ▲€64.25 million

== Pre-season and friendlies ==
Competition	Date	Opponent team	H/A	Result	Scorers
Friendly	14 July 2011	Anagenissi Arta/U.S. Cedarchis	N	18-1	4' Asamoah, 8' Abdi, 11' Vydra, 12' Fabbrini, 14' Abdi, 17' Battocchio, 21' Vydra, 26' (o.g.) Nieddu, 47' Surraco, 51' Vydra (pen.), 55' Fabbrini, 64' Pinzi, 66' Surraco, 73' Fabbrini, 74' Surraco, 75' Pinzi, 81' Vydra, 83' Doubai, 90' Cescutti M
Friendly	18 July 2011	FVG Selected Team	N	7–0	1' Fabbrini, 22' Di Natale (pen.), 27' Sissoko, 39' Danilo, 41' Fabbrini, 51' Floro Flores, 79' Candreva
Friendly	21 July 2011	Bordeaux	N	3–1	37' Di Natale, 65' Doubai, 85' Vydra
Friendly	24 July 2011	Marseille	N	2–0	32' Fabbrini, 69' Di Natale
Friendly	25 July 2011	Sacilese	N	5–1	12' Floro Flores, 39' Pinzi, 50' Denis, 81' Denis, 85' Denis
Friendly	1 Aug 2011	Nice	A	0–1
Friendly	5 Aug 2011	Cádiz	A	0–0

== Competitions ==
=== Serie A ===
==== League table ====
Pos	Team	Pld	W	D	L	GF	GA	GD	Pts	Qualification or relegation
1	Juventus (C)	38	23	15	0	68	20	+48	84	Qualification to Champions League group stage
2	Milan	38	24	8	6	74	33	+41	80	Qualification to Champions League group stage
3	Udinese	38	18	10	10	52	35	+17	64	Qualification to Champions League play-off round
4	Lazio	38	18	8	12	56	47	+9	62	Qualification to Europa League play-off round
5	Napoli	38	16	13	9	66	46	+20	61	Qualification to Europa League group stage (Note: Napoli qualified to the group stage of the Europa League as winner of the 2011–12 Coppa Italia. As they finished fifth, the sixth-placed team of the league also qualified for the Europa League.)

Source: Lega Serie A
Rules for classification: 1) points; 2) head-to-head points; 3) head-to-head goal difference; 4) head-to-head goals scored; 5) goal difference; 6) number of goals scored
(C) Champions

==== Results summary ====
Overall								Home						Away					
Pld	W	D	L	GF	GA	GD	Pts	W	D	L	GF	GA	GD	W	D	L	GF	GA	GD
38	18	10	10	52	35	+17	64	13	4	2	33	13	+20	5	6	8	19	22	−3

Last updated: 13 May 2012.
Source: Competitive matches

==== Results by round ====
Round	1	2	3	4	5	6	7	8	9	10	11	12	13	14	15	16	17	18	19	20	21	22	23	24	25	26	27	28	29	30	31	32	33	34	35	36	37	38
Ground	H	A	H	A	A	H	A	H	A	H	H	A	H	A	H	A	H	A	H	A	H	A	H	H	A	H	A	H	A	A	H	A	H	A	H	A	H	A
Result	D	W	W	D	D	W	D	W	L	W	W	L	W	W	W	D	W	L	W	L	W	L	L	D	W	D	L	D	D	L	W	L	L	D	W	W	W	W
Position	4	3	3	2	2	2	1	2	2	2	4	3	3	2	3	3	3	3	3	3	3	3	4	3	3	4	5	5	5	5	4	4	4	6	4	4	3	3

Updated to match(es) played on 13 May 2012. Source: Competitive matches
A = Away; H = Home; W = Win; D = Draw; L = Loss

==== Matches ====
11 September 2011 2	Lecce	0–2	Udinese	Lecce
15:00 CEST (UTC+02:00)		Report	Basta 2'; Di Natale 16'	Stadium: Stadio Via del Mare; Referee: Antonio Damato

18 September 2011 3	Udinese	2–0	Fiorentina	Udine
15:00 CEST (UTC+02:00)	Di Natale 8' (pen.); Isla 29'	Report		Stadium: Stadio Friuli; Referee: Andrea Romeo

21 September 2011 4	Milan	1–1	Udinese	Milan
20:45 CEST (UTC+02:00)	El Shaarawy 63'	Report	Di Natale 29'	Stadium: San Siro; Referee: Luca Banti

25 September 2011 5	Cagliari	0–0	Udinese	Cagliari
15:00 CEST (UTC+02:00)		Report		Stadium: Stadio Sant'Elia; Referee: Andrea De Marco

2 October 2011 6	Udinese	2–0	Bologna	Udine
15:00 CEST (UTC+02:00)	Benatia 29'; Di Natale 72' (pen.)	Report		Stadium: Stadio Friuli; Referee: Sebastiano Peruzzo

16 October 2011 7	Atalanta	0–0	Udinese	Bergamo
15:00 CEST (UTC+02:00)		Report		Stadium: Stadio Atleti Azzurri d'Italia; Referee: Andrea Gervasoni

23 October 2011 8	Udinese	3–0	Novara	Udine
15:00 CEST (UTC+02:00)	Di Natale 33', 49'; Domizzi 40'	Report		Stadium: Stadio Friuli; Referee: Marco Guida

26 October 2011 9	Napoli	2–0	Udinese	Naples
20:45 CEST (UTC+02:00)	Lavezzi 20'; Maggio 44'	Report		Stadium: Stadio San Paolo; Referee: Andrea De Marco

30 October 2011 10	Udinese	1–0	Palermo	Udine
15:00 CET (UTC+01:00)	Di Natale 38'	Report		Stadium: Stadio Friuli; Referee: Antonio Danilo Giannoccaro

6 November 2011 11	Udinese	2–1	Siena	Udine
15:00 CET (UTC+01:00)	Basta 1'; Di Natale 64'	Report	Bolzoni 77'	Stadium: Stadio Friuli; Referee: Carmine Russo

20 November 2011 12	Parma	2–0	Udinese	Parma
15:00 CET (UTC+01:00)	Biabiany 57'; Giovinco 76' (pen.)	Report		Stadium: Stadio Ennio Tardini; Referee: Andrea Romeo

25 November 2011 13	Udinese	2–0	Roma	Udine
20:45 CET (UTC+01:00)	Di Natale 79'; Isla 89'	Report		Stadium: Stadio Friuli; Referee: Luca Banti

3 December 2011 14	Internazionale	0–1	Udinese	Milan
20:45 CET (UTC+01:00)		Report	Isla 73'	Stadium: San Siro; Referee: Andrea Gervasoni

11 December 2011 15	Udinese	2–1	Chievo	Udine
15:00 CET (UTC+01:00)	Di Natale 68'; Basta 79'	Report	Paloschi 82'	Stadium: Stadio Friuli; Referee: Paolo Valeri

18 December 2011 16	Lazio	2–2	Udinese	Rome
20:45 CET (UTC+01:00)	Lulić 43'; Ferronetti 51' (o.g.)	Report	Floro Flores 28'; Pinzi 73'	Stadium: Stadio Olimpico; Referee: Paolo Silvio Mazzoleni

21 December 2011 1	Udinese	0–0	Juventus	Udine
18:00 CET (UTC+01:00)		Report		Stadium: Stadio Friuli; Referee: Paolo Tagliavento

8 January 2012 17	Udinese	4–1	Cesena	Udine
12:30 CET (UTC+01:00)	Di Natale 1', 82'; Asamoah 54'; Basta 75'	Report	Éder 39'	Stadium: Stadio Friuli; Referee: Gabriele Gava

15 January 2012 18	Genoa	3–2	Udinese	Genoa
15:00 CET (UTC+01:00)	Granqvist 49'; Janković 50'; Palacio 71'	Report	Ferronetti 13'; Di Natale 75' (pen.)	Stadium: Stadio Luigi Ferraris; Referee: Daniele Doveri

22 January 2012 19	Udinese	2–1	Catania	Udine
15:00 CET (UTC+01:00)	Izco 20' (o.g.); Di Natale 53'	Report	Lodi 90+4' (pen.)	Stadium: Stadio Friuli; Referee: Emilio Ostinelli

28 January 2012 20	Juventus	2–1	Udinese	Turin
20:45 CET (UTC+01:00)	Matri 42', 62'	Report	Floro Flores 56'	Stadium: Juventus Stadium; Referee: Paolo Valeri

1 February 2012 21	Udinese	2–1	Lecce	Udine
20:45 CET (UTC+01:00)	Pazienza 2'; Di Natale 37'	Report	Di Michele 26'	Stadium: Stadio Friuli; Referee: Daniele Doveri

5 February 2012 22	Fiorentina	3–2	Udinese	Florence
15:00 CET (UTC+01:00)	Jovetić 39' (pen.), 84' (pen.); Cassani 56'	Report	Di Natale 14'; Torje 90'	Stadium: Stadio Artemio Franchi; Referee: Paolo Silvio Mazzoleni

11 February 2012 23	Udinese	1–2	Milan	Udine
18:00 CET (UTC+01:00)	Di Natale 19'	Report	López 77'; El Shaarawy 85'	Stadium: Stadio Friuli; Referee: Mauro Bergonzi

19 February 2012 24	Udinese	0–0	Cagliari	Udine
20:45 CET (UTC+01:00)		Report		Stadium: Stadio Friuli; Referee: Domenico Celi

26 February 2012 25	Bologna	1–3	Udinese	Bologna
20:45 CET (UTC+01:00)	Kone 81'	Report	Di Natale 38' (pen.); Basta 56'; Floro Flores 84'	Stadium: Stadio Renato Dall'Ara; Referee: Paolo Silvio Mazzoleni

4 March 2012 26	Udinese	0–0	Atalanta	Udine
15:00 CET (UTC+01:00)		Report		Stadium: Stadio Friuli; Referee: Antonio Danilo Giannoccaro

11 March 2012 27	Novara	1–0	Udinese	Novara
20:45 CET (UTC+01:00)	Jeda 16'	Report		Stadium: Stadio Silvio Piola; Referee: Sebastiano Peruzzo

18 March 2012 28	Udinese	2–2	Napoli	Udine
20:45 CET (UTC+01:00)	Pinzi 28'; Di Natale 52'	Report	Cavani 81', 85'	Stadium: Stadio Friuli; Referee: Gianluca Rocchi

24 March 2012 29	Palermo	1–1	Udinese	Palermo
20:45 CET (UTC+01:00)	Miccoli 31'	Report	Torje 84'	Stadium: Stadio Renzo Barbera; Referee: Antonio Damato

1 April 2012 30	Siena	1–0	Udinese	Siena
15:00 CEST (UTC+02:00)	Destro 70'	Report		Stadium: Stadio Artemio Franchi – Montepaschi Arena; Referee: Paolo Tagliavento

7 April 2012 31	Udinese	3–1	Parma	Udine
15:00 CEST (UTC+02:00)	Asamoah 45+1', 90+2'; Di Natale 56'	Report	Lucarelli 84'	Stadium: Stadio Friuli; Referee: Gabriele Gava

11 April 2012 32	Roma	3–1	Udinese	Rome
20:45 CEST (UTC+02:00)	Osvaldo 8'; Totti 86'; Marquinho 90+2'	Report	Fernandes 43'	Stadium: Stadio Olimpico; Referee: Nicola Rizzoli

25 April 2012 33	Udinese	1–3	Internazionale	Udine
15:00 CEST (UTC+02:00)	Danilo 6'	Report	Sneijder 10', 28'; Álvarez 38'	Stadium: Stadio Friuli; Referee: Luca Banti

21 April 2012 34	Chievo	0–0	Udinese	Verona
18:00 CEST (UTC+02:00)		Report		Stadium: Stadio Marc'Antonio Bentegodi; Referee: Sebastiano Peruzzo

29 April 2012 35	Udinese	2–0	Lazio	Udine
20:45 CEST (UTC+02:00)	Di Natale 69'; Pereyra 90+4'	Report		Stadium: Stadio Friuli; Referee: Mauro Bergonzi

2 May 2012 36	Cesena	0–1	Udinese	Cesena
20:45 CEST (UTC+02:00)		Report	Fabbrini 4'	Stadium: Stadio Dino Manuzzi; Referee: Antonio Damato

6 May 2012 37	Udinese	2–0	Genoa	Udine
15:00 CEST (UTC+02:00)	Di Natale 30'; Floro Flores 66'	Report		Stadium: Stadio Friuli; Referee: Paolo Tagliavento

13 May 2012 38	Catania	0–2	Udinese	Catania
20:45 CEST (UTC+02:00)			Di Natale 19'; Fabbrini 58'	Stadium: Stadio Angelo Massimino; Referee: Andrea De Marco

=== Coppa Italia ===
11 January 2012 Round of 16	Udinese	1–2	Chievo	Udine
17:30 CET (UTC+01:00)	Ekstrand (yellow card) 60'; Di Natale 84'		Sammarco 8'; Dramé (yellow card) 31'; Sardo (yellow card) 59'; Cruzado (yellow card) 61'; Théréau 90+1'	Stadium: Stadio Friuli; Attendance: 5,200; Referee: Sebastiano Peruzzo

=== UEFA Champions League ===
==== Play-off round ====
16 August 2011 First leg	Arsenal (England)	1–0	(Italy) Udinese	London, England
20:45 CEST (UTC+02:00)	Walcott 4', (yellow card) 11'; Gibbs (yellow card) 45'	Report	Ekstrand (yellow card) 1'; Neuton (yellow card) 11'; Pinzi (yellow card) 71'; Armero (yellow card) 79'	Stadium: Emirates Stadium; Attendance: 58,159; Referee: Kevin Blom (Netherlands)

24 August 2011 Second leg	Udinese (Italy)	1–2 (1–3 agg.)	(England) Arsenal	Udine, Italy
20:45 CEST (UTC+02:00)	Di Natale 39'; Isla (yellow card) 52'; Benatia (yellow card) 74'	Report	Van Persie 55'; Vermaelen (yellow card) 58'; Walcott 69', (yellow card) 74'; Sagna (yellow card) 70'; Jenkinson (yellow card) 75'	Stadium: Stadio Friuli; Attendance: 26,031; Referee: Olegário Benquerença (Portugal)

=== UEFA Europa League ===
==== Group stage ====
Pos	Team	Pld	W	D	L	GF	GA	GD	Pts	Qualification
1	(Spain) Atlético Madrid	6	4	1	1	11	4	+7	13	Advance to knockout phase
2	(Italy) Udinese	6	2	3	1	6	7	−1	9	Advance to knockout phase
3	(Scotland) Celtic	6	1	3	2	6	7	−1	6	
4	(France) Rennes	6	0	3	3	5	10	−5	3	

Source: Soccerway

15 September 2011 1	Udinese (Italy)	2–1	(France) Rennes	Udine, Italy
21:05 CEST (UTC+02:00)	Di Natale 39'; Fabbrini (yellow card) 56'; Armero 83'	Report	Hadji 18'; Tettey (yellow card) 37'; Kembo Ekoko (yellow card) 38'; Dalmat (yellow card) 43'; Danzé (yellow card) 55'	Stadium: Stadio Friuli; Attendance: 8,383; Referee: Cristian Balaj (Romania)

29 September 2011 2	Celtic (Scotland)	1–1	(Italy) Udinese	Glasgow, Scotland
19:00 CEST (UTC+02:00)	Ki Sung-yueng 3' (pen.); Kayal (yellow card) 24'; Wanyama (yellow card) 82'; Samaras (yellow card) 83'	Report	Badu (yellow card) 52'; Ekstrand (yellow card) 80'; Abdi 88' (pen.)	Stadium: Celtic Park; Attendance: 28,476; Referee: Bülent Yıldırım (Turkey)

20 October 2011 3	Udinese (Italy)	2–0	(Spain) Atlético Madrid	Udine, Italy
19:00 CEST (UTC+02:00)	Badu (yellow card) 58'; Danilo (yellow card) 62'; Benatia 88'; Floro Flores 90+3'	Report	Gabi (yellow card) 73'; Assunção (yellow card) 84'	Stadium: Stadio Friuli; Attendance: 10,026; Referee: Alon Yefet (Israel)

3 November 2011 4	Atlético Madrid (Spain)	4–0	(Italy) Udinese	Madrid, Spain
21:05 CET (UTC+01:00)	Adrián 6', 12'; Diego 36'; Suárez (yellow card) 51'; Falcao 67'	Report		Stadium: Vicente Calderón Stadium; Attendance: 18,300; Referee: István Vad (Hungary)

30 November 2011 5	Rennes (France)	0–0	(Italy) Udinese	Rennes, France
19:00 CET (UTC+01:00)	Dalmat (yellow card) 29'; Mandjeck (yellow card) 51'; Tettey (yellow card) 90+2'	Report	Doubai (yellow card) 58'; Fabbrini (yellow card) 89'	Stadium: Stade de la Route de Lorient; Attendance: 17,428; Referee: Sergei Karasev (Russia)

15 December 2011 6	Udinese (Italy)	1–1	(Scotland) Celtic	Udine, Italy
21:05 CET (UTC+01:00)	Armero (yellow card) 19'; Di Natale 45+1'; Danilo (yellow card) 49'	Report	Hooper (yellow card) 4', (goal) 29'; Brown (yellow card) 62'; Cha (yellow card) 78'	Stadium: Stadio Friuli; Attendance: 8,644; Referee: Michael Koukoulakis (Greece)

==== Knockout phase ====
===== Round of 32 =====
16 February 2012 First leg	Udinese (Italy)	0–0	(Greece) PAOK	Udine, Italy
21:05 CET (UTC+01:00)		Report	Lazăr (yellow card) 66'; Fotakis (yellow card) 90'	Stadium: Stadio Friuli; Attendance: 11,641; Referee: Alberto Undiano Mallenco (Spain)

23 February 2012 Second leg	PAOK (Greece)	0–3 (0–3 agg.)	(Italy) Udinese	Thessaloniki, Greece
19:00 CET (UTC+01:00)	Cirillo (yellow card) 14'; Sznaucner (yellow card) 25'; García (yellow card) 30'; Malezas (yellow card) 50'	Report	Danilo 6'; Floro Flores 15'; Benatia (yellow card) 50'; Domizzi 51' (pen.); Fabbrini (yellow card) 54'	Stadium: Toumba Stadium; Attendance: 22,400; Referee: Tom Harald Hagen (Norway)

===== Round of 16 =====
8 March 2012 First leg	AZ (Netherlands)	2–0	(Italy) Udinese	Alkmaar, Netherlands
21:05 CET (UTC+01:00)	Martens 63'; Elm (yellow card) 75'; Falkenburg 84'	Report	Domizzi (yellow card) 57'; Pazienza (yellow card) 84'; Danilo (yellow card) 90+1'	Stadium: AFAS Stadion; Attendance: 12,579; Referee: David Fernández Borbalán (Spain)

15 March 2012 Second leg	Udinese (Italy)	2–1 (2–3 agg.)	(Netherlands) AZ	Udine, Italy
19:00 CET (UTC+01:00)	Di Natale 3' (pen.), 15'; Pasquale (yellow card) 39'; Domizzi (yellow card) 63'; Pazienza (yellow card) 74'; Pinzi (yellow card) 90+3'	Report	Viergever (red card) 3'; Falkenburg 31'; Altidore (yellow card) 55'; Maher (yellow card) 65'	Stadium: Stadio Friuli; Attendance: 13,300; Referee: Milorad Mažić (Serbia)

== Statistics ==
=== Appearances and goals ===
No.	Pos.	Player	Serie A				Coppa Italia				Champions League				Europa League				Total
No.	Pos.	Player	App.	Goal			App.	Goal			App.	Goal			App.	Goal			App.(Start)	Goal
1	GK	(Slovenia) Samir Handanović	38	-35	3	0	1	-2	0	0	2	-3	0	0	10	-10	0	0	51(51)	-50	3	0
3	MF	(Chile) Mauricio Isla	21	3	2	0					2	0	1	0	5	0	1	0	28(25)	3	3	0
4	MF	(Italy) Michele Pazienza	23	1	3	0	1	0	1	0					4	0	2	0	28(18)	1	6	0
5	DF	(Brazil) Danilo	37	1	6	0	1	0	0	0	2	0	0	0	9	1	3	0	49(49)	2	9	0
7	MF	(Ghana) Emmanuel Agyemang-Badu	10	0	2	0					2	0	0	0	6	0	2	0	18(14)	0	4	0
8	MF	(Serbia) Dušan Basta	31	5	2	0	1	0	0	0					7	0	0	0	39(35)	5	2	0
9	FW	(Brazil) Barreto	7	0	1	0									1	0	0	0	8(2)	0	1	0
10	FW	(Italy) Antonio Di Natale	36	23	2	0	1	1	0	0	2	1	0	0	4	4	0	0	43(41)	29	2	0
11	DF	(Italy) Maurizio Domizzi	31	1	7	0									7	1	2	0	38(36)	2	9	0
13	DF	(Brazil) Neuton	4	0	0	0					2	0	1	0	3	0	0	0	9(6)	0	1	0
16	DF	(Italy) Andrea Coda	7	0	1	0													7(6)	0	1	0
17	DF	(Morocco) Mehdi Benatia	27	1	9	0					2	0	1	0	9	1	1	0	38(37)	2	11	0
18	MF	(Argentina) Cristian Battocchio	4	0	0	0									3	0	0	0	7(2)	0	0	0
19	FW	(Argentina) Germán Denis^{1}									1	0	0	0					1(0)	0	0	0
20	MF	(Ghana) Kwadwo Asamoah	31	3	3	0					2	0	0	0	7	0	0	0	40(38)	3	3	0
23	MF	(Switzerland) Almen Abdi	23	0	3	0	1	0	0	0	1	0	0	0	8	1	0	0	33(16)	1	3	0
24	DF	(Sweden) Joel Ekstrand	11	0	4	0	1	0	1	0	2	0	1	0	5	0	1	0	19(13)	0	7	0
25	MF	(Romania) Gabriel Torje	21	2	1	0	1	0	0	0									22(12)	2	1	0
26	DF	(Italy) Giovanni Pasquale	20	0	0	0	1	0	0	0	2	0	0	0	4	0	1	0	27(17)	0	1	0
27	DF	(Colombia) Pablo Armero	28	0	7	0					2	0	1	0	9	1	1	0	39(35)	1	9	0
30	MF	(Ivory Coast) Thierry Doubai	1	0	0	0									6	0	1	0	7(5)	0	1	0
31	FW	(Italy) Diego Fabbrini	15	2	3	1	1	0	0	0	1	0	0	0	8	0	3	0	25(14)	2	7	1
32	DF	(Italy) Damiano Ferronetti	15	1	1	1	1	0	0	0					3	0	0	0	19(14)	1	1	1
37	MF	(Argentina) Roberto Pereyra	11	1	3	0	1	0	0	0					3	0	0	0	15(11)	1	3	0
66	MF	(Italy) Giampiero Pinzi	28	2	2	10	1				2	0	1	0	6	0	0	0	36(33)	2	11	1
83	FW	(Italy) Antonio Floro Flores	26	4	4	0	1	0	0	0					7	2	0	0	34(19)	6	4	0
No.	Pos.	Player	App.	Goal			App.	Goal			App.	Goal			App.	Goal			App.	Goal
No.	Pos.	Player	Serie A				Coppa Italia				Champions League				Europa League				Total

Note:
1. Moved to Atalanta on-loan before Serie-A begins.
