= 2010–11 Udinese Calcio season =

Udinese
2010–11 season
- Chairman: Franco Soldati
- Manager: Francesco Guidolin
- Stadium: Stadio Friuli
- Serie A: 4th
- Coppa Italia: Round of 16
- Top goalscorer: League: Antonio Di Natale (28); All: Antonio Di Natale (28)
- Highest home attendance: 29,644 vs Milan (22 May 2011, Serie A)
- Lowest home attendance: 2,733 vs Lecce (24 November 2010, Coppa Italia)
- Average home league attendance: 17,554
Home colours	Away colours	Third colours

The 2010–11 season was Udinese Calcio's 16th consecutive and 31st Serie A season. The club competed in both Serie A and the Coppa Italia. Udinese finished in fourth place to qualify for the play-off round of the 2011–12 UEFA Champions League.

== Players ==
=== Squad information ===
Updated 28 January 2010 Note: Flags indicate national team as defined under FIFA eligibility rules; some limited exceptions apply. Players may hold more than one non-FIFA nationality.

No.	Pos.	Nation	Player
1	GK	SLO	Samir Handanović
2	DF	COL	Cristián Zapata (vice captain)
3	DF	CHI	Mauricio Isla
4	DF	COL	Juan Cuadrado
6	GK	ITA	Emanuele Belardi
7	FW	CHI	Alexis Sánchez
8	MF	SRB	Dušan Basta
9	FW	ITA	Bernardo Corradi
10	FW	ITA	Antonio Di Natale (captain)
11	DF	ITA	Maurizio Domizzi
12	GK	SLO	Jan Koprivec
13	DF	ITA	Andrea Coda
15	FW	CMR	Steve Leo Beleck
16	FW	ARG	Germán Denis
17	DF	MAR	Medhi Benatia
18	MF	ARG	Cristian Battocchio

No.	Pos.	Nation	Player
19	MF	GHA	Emmanuel Agyemang-Badu
20	MF	GHA	Kwadwo Asamoah
21	FW	CZE	Matěj Vydra
22	DF	SWE	Joel Ekstrand
23	MF	SUI	Almen Abdi
26	DF	ITA	Giovanni Pasquale
27	DF	COL	Pablo Armero
32	DF	ITA	Damiano Ferronetti
45	DF	ITA	Gabriele Angella
50	GK	ROU	Alin Bucuroiu
51	DF	ITA	Daniele Cotrufo
53	MF	ITA	Daniel Manca
54	DF	ITA	Alex Ortobelli
66	MF	ITA	Giampiero Pinzi
88	MF	SUI	Gökhan Inler

== Transfers ==
For all transfers and loans pertaining to Udinese for the current season, please see: 2010 summer transfers and 2010–11 winter transfers.

=== Summer 2010 ===
==== In ====
Player	Position	Old Club	Details
(Morocco) Medhi Benatia	Defender	(France) Clermont
(Switzerland) Almen Abdi	Midfielder	(France) Le Mans	Undisclosed
(Colombia) Pablo Armero	Defender	(Brazil) Palmeiras	Undisclosed
(Argentina) Germán Denis	Forward	Napoli	Co-ownership

==== Out ====
Player	Position	New Club	Details
(Italy) Gaetano D'Agostino	Forward	Fiorentina	€9,000,000, Co-ownership
(Italy) Simone Pepe	Forward	Juventus	€2,600,000, Loan with signing option
(Italy) Marco Motta	Defender	Juventus	Loan with signing option
(Serbia) Aleksandar Luković	Defender	(Russia) Zenit	€7,500,000

=== Winter 2010–11 ===
==== Out ====
Player	Position	New Club	Details
(Italy) Antonio Floro Flores	Forward	Genoa	€1,500,000, Loan with signing option

== Pre-season and friendlies ==
Competition	Date	Opponent team	H/A	Result	Scorers
Friendly	25 July 2010	Representative of Friuli-Venezia Giulia	N	5–1	Beleck 34', Cuadrado 38', Romero 68', Abdi 72', Floro Flores 80'
Friendly	29 July 2010	A.S. San Paolo Padova	N	5–0	Cuadrado 14', Zapata 41', Beleck 43', Floro Flores 80', Battocchio 88'
Friendly	1 Aug 2010	A.S.D. Sanvitese	N	2–1	Cuadrado 6', Zapata 34'
Friendly	4 Aug 2010	Calcio Montebelluna	N	7–0	Corradi 17', 19', 42', Sánchez 60', Vydra 64', Pinzi 82' Cuadrado 83'
Friendly	5 Aug 2010	Calcio Portogruaro Summaga	N	2–0	Matute 42', Landgren 64'
Friendly	7 Aug 2010	Eintracht Frankfurt	H	2–1	Inler 54' (pen.), 76' (pen.)
Friendly	14 Aug 2010	Brescia	N	0–0	(suspended at 22' due to heavy rain)
Friendly	18 Aug 2010	S.P. Tamai	H	3–0	Abdi 11', 59', Floro Flores 85'

== Competitions ==
=== Serie A ===
==== League table ====
Pos	Team	Pld	W	D	L	GF	GA	GD	Pts	Qualification or relegation
2	Internazionale	38	23	7	8	69	42	+27	76	Qualification to Champions League group stage
3	Napoli	38	21	7	10	59	39	+20	70	Qualification to Champions League group stage
4	Udinese	38	20	6	12	65	43	+22	66 (Note: Udinese finished ahead of Lazio on head-to-head away goals scored: Udinese 2–1 Lazio, Lazio 3–2 Udinese.)	Qualification to Champions League play-off round
5	Lazio	38	20	6	12	55	39	+16	66	Qualification to Europa League play-off round (Note: As Internazionale won the 2010–11 Coppa Italia and already qualified for the Champions League, Palermo entered the 2011–12 UEFA Europa League third qualification round as the cup runners-up.)
6	Roma	38	18	9	11	59	52	+7	63	Qualification to Europa League play-off round

Source: Lega Serie A
Rules for classification: 1) points; 2) head-to-head points; 3) head-to-head goal difference; 4) head-to-head goals scored; 5) goal difference; 6) number of goals scored.

==== Results summary ====
Overall								Home						Away					
Pld	W	D	L	GF	GA	GD	Pts	W	D	L	GF	GA	GD	W	D	L	GF	GA	GD
38	20	6	12	65	43	+22	66	11	4	4	27	16	+11	9	2	8	38	27	+11

Last updated: 22 May 2011.
Source: Competitive matches

==== Results by round ====
Round	1	2	3	4	5	6	7	8	9	10	11	12	13	14	15	16	17	18	19	20	21	22	23	24	25	26	27	28	29	30	31	32	33	34	35	36	37	38
Ground	H	A	H	A	A	H	A	H	A	H	A	H	A	H	A	H	A	H	A	A	H	A	H	H	A	H	A	H	A	H	A	H	A	H	A	H	A	H
Result	L	L	L	L	D	W	W	W	W	D	L	W	L	W	L	W	L	W	D	W	W	W	D	W	W	D	W	W	W	W	L	L	W	L	L	W	W	D
Position	17	20	20	20	20	20	18	11	8	10	12	8	11	9	11	9	10	8	8	8	8	6	7	7	5	5	5	5	4	4	4	5	5	5	5	4	4	4

Updated to match(es) played on 22 May 2011. Source: Competitive matches
A = Away; H = Home; W = Win; D = Draw; L = Loss

==== Matches ====
28 August 2010 1	Udinese	0–1	Genoa	Udine
18:00 CEST (UTC+02:00)	Domizzi (yellow card) 64'; Pasquale (yellow card) 80'	Report	Sculli (yellow card) 21'; Veloso (yellow card) 26'; Dainelli (yellow card) 30'; Mesto 81'	Stadium: Stadio Friuli; Attendance: 14,500; Referee: Gianluca Rocchi

11 September 2010 2	Internazionale	2–1	Udinese	Milan
18:00 CEST (UTC+02:00)	Lúcio 7'; Zanetti (yellow card) 10'; Eto'o (yellow card) 52', (goal) 67'	Report	Floro Flores 31'; Pinzi (yellow card) 34'; Di Natale (yellow card) 69'; Cuadrado (yellow card) 89'	Stadium: San Siro; Attendance: 62,014; Referee: Christian Brighi

19 September 2010 3	Udinese	0–4	Juventus	Udine
15:00 CEST (UTC+02:00)		Report	Bonucci 18'; Quagliarella 24'; Pepe (yellow card) 29'; Marchisio (yellow card) 35', (goal) 43'; Melo (yellow card) 41'; Iaquinta 77', (yellow card) 77'	Stadium: Stadio Friuli; Attendance: 20,757; Referee: Mauro Bergonzi

22 September 2010 4	Bologna	2–1	Udinese	Bologna
20:45 CEST (UTC+02:00)	Giménez 16'; Rubin (yellow card) 52'; Mutarelli (yellow card) 84'; Di Vaio 90'	Report	Di Natale 9'; Pinzi (yellow card) 64'; Benatia (yellow card) 72'; Corradi (yellow card) 77'; Domizzi (yellow card) 89'	Stadium: Stadio Renato Dall'Ara; Attendance: 14,220; Referee: Domenico Celi

26 September 2010 5	Sampdoria	0–0	Udinese	Genoa
15:00 CEST (UTC+02:00)	Dessena (yellow card) 33'	Report	Zapata (yellow card) 75'; Handanović (yellow card) 89'	Stadium: Stadio Luigi Ferraris; Attendance: 21,478; Referee: Andrea Gervasoni

2 October 2010 6	Udinese	1–0	Cesena	Udine
18:00 CEST (UTC+02:00)	Zapata (yellow card) 24'; Abdi (yellow card) 88'; Benatia 90+3'	Report	Ceccarelli (yellow card) 7'; Benalouane (yellow card) 40'	Stadium: Stadio Friuli; Attendance: 13,968; Referee: Gianluca Rocchi

17 October 2010 7	Brescia	0–1	Udinese	Brescia
15:00 CEST (UTC+02:00)	Baiocco (yellow card) 29'; Hetemaj (yellow card) 37'	Report	Pinzi (yellow card) 16'; Corradi 80'	Stadium: Stadio Mario Rigamonti; Attendance: 5,397; Referee: Andrea Romeo

24 October 2010 8	Udinese	2–1	Palermo	Udine
15:00 CEST (UTC+02:00)	Benatia 9'; Coda (yellow card) 34' (yellow-red card) 64'; Di Natale 54' (pen.); Isla (yellow card) 66'; Handanović (yellow card) 90+4'	Report	Muñoz (yellow card) 9'; Bačinović (yellow card) 44'; Cassani (yellow card) 53'; Pinilla 83', (yellow card) 87'; Goian (yellow card) 85'	Stadium: Stadio Friuli; Attendance: 14,714; Referee: Antonio Danilo Giannoccaro

31 October 2010 9	Bari	0–2	Udinese	Bari
15:00 CET (UTC+01:00)	Rossi (yellow card) 40'; Gazzi (yellow card) 54'	Report	Sánchez 16', (yellow card) 73'; Zapata (yellow card) 52'; Isla 60'	Stadium: Stadio San Nicola; Attendance: 15,701; Referee: Nicola Pierpaoli

7 November 2010 10	Udinese	1–1	Cagliari	Udine
15:00 CET (UTC+01:00)	Floro Flores 44'; Zapata (yellow card) 69'	Report	Conti 12'; Nainggolan (yellow card) 27'; Pinardi (yellow card) 80'; Astori (yellow card) 90+2'	Stadium: Stadio Friuli; Attendance: 14,056; Referee: Riccardo Tozzi

10 November 2010 11	Catania	1–0	Udinese	Catania
20:45 CET (UTC+01:00)	Terlizzi (yellow card) 32'; Ledesma (yellow card) 38' (yellow-red card) 86'; Maxi López 60'	Report	Armero (yellow card) 32'; Pinzi (yellow card) 34'; Benatia (yellow card) 57'	Stadium: Stadio Angelo Massimino; Attendance: 12,418; Referee: Andrea De Marco

14 November 2010 12	Udinese	4–0	Lecce	Udine
15:00 CET (UTC+01:00)	Di Natale 11', 24', 40'; Floro Flores 56'	Report	Olivera (yellow card) 65'	Stadium: Stadio Friuli; Attendance: 13,860; Referee: Paolo Mazzoleni

20 November 2010 13	Roma	2–0	Udinese	Rome
18:00 CET (UTC+01:00)	Ménez 24'; Borriello 56'; Simplício (yellow card) 58'; Cassetti (yellow card) 65'; Burdisso (red card) 81'	Report	Inler (yellow card) 39'; Pinzi (yellow card) 61'	Stadium: Stadio Olimpico; Attendance: 28,863; Referee: Daniele Orsato

28 November 2010 14	Udinese	3–1	Napoli	Udine
15:00 CET (UTC+01:00)	Di Natale 16' (pen.), 45', 57'; Pinzi (yellow card) 67'; Benatia (yellow card) 77'; Domizzi (yellow card) 81'	Report	De Sanctis (yellow card) 15'; Maggio (yellow card) 34'; Cannavaro (yellow card) 44'; Hamšík 58'; Vitale (yellow card) 67'	Stadium: Stadio Friuli; Attendance: 15,087; Referee: Andrea Romeo

5 December 2010 15	Parma	2–1	Udinese	Parma
15:00 CET (UTC+01:00)	Crespo 24' (pen.), 55'	Report	Di Natale 35'	Stadium: Stadio Ennio Tardini; Attendance: 12,223; Referee: Domenico Celi

11 December 2010 16	Udinese	2–1	Fiorentina	Udine
18:00 CET (UTC+01:00)	Armero 63'; Di Natale 80'	Report	Santana 31'	Stadium: Stadio Friuli; Attendance: 14,107; Referee: Andrea De Marco

19 December 2010 17	Lazio	3–2	Udinese	Rome
12:30 CET (UTC+01:00)	Hernanes 2'; Biava 52'; Zapata 88' (o.g.)	Report	Sánchez 49'; Denis 61'	Stadium: Stadio Olimpico; Attendance: 20,644; Referee: Andrea Gervasoni

6 January 2011 18	Udinese	2–0	Chievo	Udine
15:00 CET (UTC+01:00)	Sánchez 14'; Di Natale 25'	Report		Stadium: Stadio Friuli; Attendance: 13,559; Referee: Gabriele Gava

9 January 2011 19	Milan	4–4	Udinese	Milan
15:00 CET (UTC+01:00)	Pato 45+1', 82'; Benatia 78' (o.g.); Ibrahimović 90+3'	Report	Di Natale 35', 66'; Sánchez 53'; Denis 89'	Stadium: San Siro; Attendance: 39,405; Referee: Paolo Valeri

16 January 2011 20	Genoa	2–4	Udinese	Genoa
15:00 CET (UTC+01:00)	Milanetto 45+1'; Destro 57'	Report	Armero 27'; Di Natale 56'; Sánchez 69'; Denis 90'	Stadium: Stadio Luigi Ferraris; Attendance: 21,448; Referee: Marco Guida

23 January 2011 21	Udinese	3–1	Internazionale	Udine
12:30 CET (UTC+01:00)	Zapata 21'; Di Natale 25'; Domizzi 69'	Report	Stanković 16'	Stadium: Stadio Friuli; Attendance: 26,036; Referee: Emidio Morganti

30 January 2011 22	Juventus	1–2	Udinese	Turin
20:45 CET (UTC+01:00)	Marchisio 60'	Report	Zapata 67'; Sánchez 85'	Stadium: Stadio Olimpico di Torino; Attendance: 17,923; Referee: Antonio Danilo Giannoccaro

2 February 2011 23	Udinese	1–1	Bologna	Udine
20:45 CET (UTC+01:00)	Domizzi 77'	Report	Di Vaio 64'	Stadium: Stadio Friuli; Attendance: 13,342; Referee: Daniele Doveri

5 February 2011 24	Udinese	2–0	Sampdoria	Udine
18:00 CET (UTC+01:00)	Sánchez 18'; Di Natale 40'	Report		Stadium: Stadio Friuli; Attendance: 14,383; Referee: Nicola Pierpaoli

13 February 2011 25	Cesena	0–3	Udinese	Cesena
15:00 CET (UTC+01:00)		Report	Di Natale 41', 75'; Inler 69'	Stadium: Stadio Dino Manuzzi; Attendance: 16,704; Referee: Daniele Orsato

20 February 2011 26	Udinese	0–0	Brescia	Udine
15:00 CET (UTC+01:00)		Report		Stadium: Stadio Friuli; Attendance: 15,214; Referee: Mauro Bergonzi

27 February 2011 27	Palermo	0–7	Udinese	Palermo
15:00 CET (UTC+01:00)		Report	Di Natale 10', 41', 60' (pen.); Sánchez 19', 28', 42', 48'	Stadium: Stadio Renzo Barbera; Attendance: 22,831; Referee: Sebastiano Peruzzo

6 March 2011 28	Udinese	1–0	Bari	Udine
15:00 CET (UTC+01:00)	Di Natale 76' (pen.)	Report		Stadium: Stadio Friuli; Attendance: 15,904; Referee: Davide Massa

13 March 2011 29	Cagliari	0–4	Udinese	Cagliari
15:00 CET (UTC+01:00)		Report	Benatia 42'; Sánchez 44'; Di Natale 48', 54'	Stadium: Stadio Sant'Elia; Referee: Luca Banti

20 March 2011 30	Udinese	2–0	Catania	Udine
15:00 CET (UTC+01:00)	Inler 22'; Di Natale 74' (pen.)	Report		Stadium: Stadio Friuli; Attendance: 17,847; Referee: Carmine Russo

3 April 2011 31	Lecce	2–0	Udinese	Lecce
15:00 CEST (UTC+02:00)	Bertolacci 48', 65'	Report		Stadium: Stadio Via del Mare; Attendance: 10,196; Referee: Andrea De Marco

9 April 2011 32	Udinese	1–2	Roma	Udine
20:45 CEST (UTC+02:00)	Di Natale 87'	Report	Totti 57' (pen.), 90+4'	Stadium: Stadio Friuli; Attendance: 24,981; Referee: Antonio Damato

17 April 2011 33	Napoli	1–2	Udinese	Naples
20:45 CEST (UTC+02:00)	Mascara 90+6'	Report	Inler 55'; Denis 61'	Stadium: Stadio San Paolo; Attendance: 56,757; Referee: Paolo Tagliavento

23 April 2011 34	Udinese	0–2	Parma	Udine
15:00 CEST (UTC+02:00)		Report	Amauri 13', 90+1'	Stadium: Stadio Friuli; Attendance: 19,518; Referee: Paolo Valeri

1 May 2011 35	Fiorentina	5–2	Udinese	Florence
15:00 CEST (UTC+02:00)	Vargas 9'; D'Agostino 21', 51'; Cerci 71', 86'	Report	Pinzi 29'; Asamoah 57'	Stadium: Stadio Artemio Franchi; Attendance: 24,604; Referee: Christian Brighi

8 May 2011 36	Udinese	2–1	Lazio	Udine
15:00 CEST (UTC+02:00)	Di Natale 35', 42'	Report	Kozák 76'	Stadium: Stadio Friuli; Attendance: 22,044; Referee: Nicola Rizzoli

15 May 2011 37	Chievo	0–2	Udinese	Verona
15:00 CEST (UTC+02:00)		Report	Isla 28'; Asamoah 75'	Stadium: Stadio Marc'Antonio Bentegodi; Attendance: 19,031; Referee: Gianluca Rocchi

22 May 2011 38	Udinese	0–0	Milan	Udine
20:45 CEST (UTC+02:00)		Report		Stadium: Stadio Friuli; Attendance: 29,644; Referee: Paolo Tagliavento

=== Coppa Italia ===
27 October 2010 Third round	Udinese	4–0	Padova	Udine
15:00 CEST (UTC+02:00)	Floro Flores 21'; Corradi 25', 57'; Angella 43'			Stadium: Stadio Friuli; Referee: Gabriele Gava

24 November 2010 Fourth round	Udinese	2–1 (a.e.t.)	Lecce	Udine
19:00 CET (UTC+01:00)	Corradi 78' (pen.); Floro Flores 119'		Chevantón 17'	Stadium: Stadio Friuli; Attendance: 2,733; Referee: Sebastiano Peruzzo

19 January 2011 Round of 16	Sampdoria	2–2 (a.e.t.) (5–4 p)	Udinese	Genoa
17:30 CET (UTC+01:00)	Macheda 31'; Pazzini 108' (pen.)		Isla 90'; Denis 91'	Stadium: Stadio Luigi Ferraris; Attendance: 5,082; Referee: Domenico Celi
	Penalties
	Mannini (penalty scored); Pozzi (penalty scored); Guberti (penalty scored); Ziegler (penalty missed); Pazzini (penalty scored); Tissone (penalty scored)		(penalty scored) Sánchez; (penalty scored) Abdi; (penalty scored) Inler; (penalty scored) Armero; (penalty missed) Denis; (penalty missed) Isla

== Statistics ==
=== Appearances and goals ===
No.	Pos	Nat	Player	Total		Serie A		Coppa Italia	
No.	Pos	Nat	Player	Apps	Goals	Apps	Goals	Apps	Goals
Goalkeepers
1	GK	(Slovenia) SLO	Samir Handanović	35	0	35	0	0	0
6	GK	(Italy) ITA	Emanuele Belardi	6	0	3	0	3	0
12	GK	(Slovenia) SLO	Jan Koprivec	0	0	0	0	0	0
Defenders
2	DF	(Colombia) COL	Cristián Zapata	38	2	35	2	3	0
3	DF	(Chile) CHI	Mauricio Isla	35	3	34	2	1	1
4	DF	(Colombia) COL	Juan Cuadrado	12	0	9	0	3	0
8	DF	(Serbia) SRB	Dušan Basta	0	0	0	0	0	0
11	DF	(Italy) ITA	Maurizio Domizzi	31	2	30	2	1	0
13	DF	(Italy) ITA	Andrea Coda	25	0	22	0	3	0
17	DF	(Morocco) MAR	Mehdi Benatia	34	3	34	3	0	0
26	DF	(Italy) ITA	Giovanni Pasquale	19	0	17	0	2	0
27	DF	(Colombia) COL	Pablo Armero	33	2	31	2	2	0
32	DF	(Italy) ITA	Damiano Ferronetti	0	0	0	0	0	0
45	DF	(Italy) ITA	Gabriele Angella	11	1	8	0	3	1
Midfielders
18	MF	(Italy) ITA	Cristian Battocchio	1	0	1	0	0	0
19	MF	(Ghana) GHA	Emmanuel Agyemang-Badu	11	0	8	0	3	0
20	MF	(Ghana) GHA	Kwadwo Asamoah	39	2	38	2	1	0
22	MF	(Sweden) SWE	Joel Ekstrand	1	0	1	0	0	0
23	MF	(Switzerland) SUI	Almen Abdi	21	0	19	0	2	0
66	MF	(Italy) ITA	Giampiero Pinzi	35	1	34	1	1	0
88	MF	(Switzerland) SUI	Gökhan Inler	36	3	35	3	1	0
Forwards
7	FW	(Chile) CHI	Alexis Sánchez	33	12	31	12	2	0
9	FW	(Italy) ITA	Bernardo Corradi	20	4	18	1	2	3
10	FW	(Italy) ITA	Antonio Di Natale	37	28	36	28	1	0
15	FW	(Cameroon) CMR	Steve Leo Beleck	0	0	0	0	0	0
16	FW	(Argentina) ARG	Germán Denis	27	5	25	4	2	1
21	FW	(Czech Republic) CZE	Matěj Vydra	3	0	2	0	1	0
Players transferred out during the season
22	FW	(Italy) ITA	Fernando Forestieri	1	0	0	0	1	0
25	MF	(Italy) ITA	Piermario Morosini	2	0	0	0	2	0
83	FW	(Italy) ITA	Antonio Floro Flores	17	8	15	6	2	2

Last updated: 23 September 2015
Source: Competitions
