= 2011–12 in Spanish football =

The 2011–12 season was the 108th season of competitive football in Spain.

The season began on 3 August 2011 for the Copa Federación, 19 August for Tercera División, 20 August for Segunda División B, 26 August for Segunda División, 27 August for La Liga and 31 August 2011 for the Copa del Rey. Both La Liga and Segunda División had a delayed start after the Association of Spanish Footballers (AFE) called a strike. The season ended on 13 May 2012 for La Liga, 17 June 2012 for Segunda División and 24 June for Segunda División B and Tercera División.

== Promotion and relegation (pre-season) ==
Teams promoted to 2011–12 La Liga

- Real Betis
- Rayo Vallecano
- Granada

Teams relegated from 2010–11 La Liga

- Deportivo La Coruña
- Hércules
- Almerí

Teams promoted to 2011–12 Segunda División

- Sabadell
- Real Murcia
- Alcoyano
- Guadalajara

Teams relegated from 2010–11 Segunda División

- Salamanca
- Tenerife
- Ponferradina
- Albacete

Teams promoted to 2011–12 Segunda División B

- Marino de Luanco
- CF Villanovense
- Valencia CF Mestalla
- Burgos CF
- SD Amorebieta
- CD Toledo
- UE Llagostera
- Andorra CF
- RB Linense
- CF Reus Deportiu
- CD Olímpic de Xàtiva
- CD Manacor
- Sporting Villanueva Promesas
- Arandina CF
- UD San Sebastián de los Reyes
- Sestao River Club
- Gimnástica Segoviana CF
- La Roda CF
- Real Zaragoza B
- Huracán Valencia

Teams relegated from 2010–11 Segunda División B

- Universidad LPGC
- Deportivo de La Coruña B
- Pontevedra CF
- Extremadura UD
- AD Cerro Reyes
- Caudal Deportivo
- Cultural Leonesa
- CD La Muela
- Peña Sport FC
- Barakaldo CF
- Alicante CF
- CD Castellón
- Benidorm CF
- UD Alzira
- UDA Gramenet
- FC Santboià
- CD Alcalá
- Unión Estepona CF
- Yeclano Deportivo
- Jumilla CF

== National team ==
The home team is on the left column; the away team is on the right column.

=== UEFA Euro qualifiers ===
Spain was in Group I of the Euro 2012 qualification process.

6 September 2011	Spain	6 – 0	Liechtenstein	Logroño
22:00 UTC+2	Negredo 33', 37'; Xavi 44'; Ramos 52'; Villa 60', 79'			Stadium: Estadio Las Gaunas; Attendance: 17,130; Referee: Harald Lechner (Austria)

7 October 2011	Czech Republic	0 – 2	Spain	Prague, Czech Republic
20:45 UTC+2			Mata 6'; Alonso 23'	Stadium: Generali Arena; Attendance: 17,873; Referee: Paolo Tagliavento (Italy)

11 October 2011	Spain	3 – 1	Scotland	Alicante
20:45 UTC+2	Silva 5', 43'; Villa 53'		Goodwillie 64' (pen.)	Stadium: Estadio José Rico Pérez; Attendance: 28,000; Referee: Stefan Johannesson (Sweden)

=== Friendlies ===
10 August 2011	Italy	2 – 1	Spain	Bari, Italy
20:45 UTC+2	Montolivo 11'; Aquilani 84'		Alonso 37' (pen.)	Stadium: Stadio San Nicola; Attendance: 50,000; Referee: Felix Brych (Germany)

2 September 2011	Spain	3 – 2	Chile	St. Gallen, Switzerland
20:45 UTC+2	Iniesta 55'; Fàbregas 70', 90'		Isla 10'; Vargas 20'	Stadium: AFG Arena; Attendance: 14,605; Referee: Jérôme Laperrière (Switzerland)

12 November 2011	England	1 – 0	Spain	London, England
17:15 UTC	Lampard 49'			Stadium: Wembley Stadium; Attendance: 87,189; Referee: Frank De Bleeckere (Belgium)

15 November 2011	Costa Rica	2 – 2	Spain	San José, Costa Rica
22:05 UTC–6	Brenes 31'; Campbell 41'		Silva 82'; Villa 90+1'	Stadium: Estadio Nacional de Costa Rica; Attendance: 30,000; Referee: Mauricio Navarro (Canada)

29 February 2012	Spain	5 – 0	Venezuela	Málaga
22:00 UTC+2	Iniesta 37'; Silva 42'; Soldado 50', 52', 83'			Stadium: La Rosaleda; Attendance: 28,000; Referee: Andris Treimanis (Latvia)

26 May 2012	Spain	2 – 0	Serbia	St. Gallen, Switzerland
18:00 CEST	Adrián 64'; Cazorla 74' (pen.)			Stadium: AFG Arena; Attendance: 15,625; Referee: Cyril Zimmermann (Switzerland)

30 May 2012	South Korea	1 – 4	Spain	Bern, Switzerland
20:00 CEST	Kim Do-heon 43'		Torres 11'; Alonso 52' (pen.); Cazorla 56'; Negredo 80'	Stadium: Stade de Suisse; Attendance: 10,220; Referee: Alain Bieri (Switzerland)

3 June 2012	Spain	1 – 0	China	Sevilla
21:00	Silva 84'			Stadium: Estadio de La Cartuja

== Pre-season tournaments ==
22 July 2011 Memorial Quinocho	Celta Vigo (Spain)	2 – 1	(Portugal) Braga	Vigo, Spain
21:00 CEST	Tomás 51' (pen.); Pillado 68'	(Report)	Henrique 68'	Stadium: Balaídos; Attendance: 6,000; Referee: Julio Amoedo Chas

27 July 2011 Ciutat de Barcelona	Espanyol (Spain)	3 – 1	(Argentina) Boca Juniors	Barcelona, Spain
21:30 CEST	Osvaldo 60' (pen.), 78'; Verdú 87' (pen.)	(Report)	Cvitanich 55'	Stadium: Cornellà-El Prat; Attendance: 25,000; Referee: Xavier Estrada Fernández

2 August 2011 Trofeo Ágora	Levante (Spain)	0 – 2	(Uruguay) Peñarol	Valencia, Spain
21:30 CEST		Report	Palacios 44'; Silva 80'	Stadium: Ciutat de València; Attendance: 5,000; Referee: Francisco Javier Barberá Fuentes

4 August 2011 Antonio Puerta	Sevilla (Spain)	5 – 0	(Spain) Espanyol	Seville, Spain
22:00 CEST	Rodri 25', 76'; Manu 45+1'; Kanouté 73', 90'	(Report)		Stadium: Ramón Sánchez Pizjuán; Attendance: 20,000; Referee: José Luis Paradas Romero

4 August 2011 Carranza Semifinal	Cádiz (Spain)	0 – 0 (3 – 1 p)	(Italy) Udinese	Cádiz, Spain
22:00 CEST		Report		Stadium: Ramón de Carranza; Attendance: 6,000; Referee: Domingo Palomino Núñez
	Penalties
	Baquero (penalty scored); Juanjo (penalty missed); Góngora (penalty scored); Dioni (penalty scored)		(penalty missed) Larangeira; (penalty missed) Floro Flores; (penalty scored) Vydra; (penalty missed) Neuton

6 August 2011 Ciudad de Vigo	Celta Vigo (Spain)	0 – 1	(Spain) Sporting Gijón	Vigo, Spain
20:00 CEST		Report	De las Cuevas 90+2'	Stadium: Balaídos; Attendance: 3,000; Referee: Rubén Eiriz Mata

5 August 2011 Carranza Semifinal	Málaga (Spain)	3 – 1	(Portugal) Sporting CP	Cádiz, Spain
22:00 CEST	Baptista 37', 75'; Van Nistelrooy 41'	Report	Carrillo 60'	Stadium: Ramón de Carranza; Attendance: 10,000; Referee: Pedro Jesús Pérez Montero

6 August 2011 Carranza 3rd/4th	Udinese (Italy)	2 – 2 (10 – 9 p)	(Portugal) Sporting CP	Cádiz, Spain
18:30 CEST	Abdi 15'; Floro Flores 79'	Report	Rubio 47', 90' (pen.)	Stadium: Ramón de Carranza; Attendance: 4,000; Referee: Alonso Vizuete Sánchez
	Penalties
	Flores (penalty scored); Pinzi (penalty scored); Surraco (penalty scored); Neuton (penalty missed); Fabbrini (penalty scored); Fabbrini (penalty scored); Badu (penalty scored); Doubai (penalty scored); Ekstrand (penalty scored); Pasquale (penalty scored); Handanović (penalty scored); Flores (penalty scored)		(penalty scored) Martins; (penalty scored) Rubio; (penalty missed) Capel; (penalty scored) Rodríguez; (penalty scored) Santos; (penalty scored) Polga; (penalty scored) Pereirinha; (penalty scored) Evaldo; (penalty scored) Rinaudo; (penalty scored) Marcelo; (penalty missed) Martins

6 August 2011 Carranza Final	Cádiz (Spain)	2 – 0	(Spain) Málaga	Cádiz, Spain
22:00 CEST	Juanjo 76'; Dioni 90+2'	Report		Stadium: Ramón de Carranza; Attendance: 6,691; Referee: Javier Turienzo Álvarez

12 August 2011 Trofeo Colombino	Recreativo (Spain)	1 – 2	(Spain) Atlético Madrid	Huelva, Spain
22:00 CEST	Vega 62'	Report	Adrián 32'; Salvio 77'	Stadium: Nuevo Colombino; Attendance: 10,000; Referee: Antonio Mariscal Sánchez

12 August 2011 Trofeo Naranja	Valencia (Spain)	3 – 0	(Italy) Roma	Valencia, Spain
22:00 CEST	Viviani 21' (o.g.); Soldado 36'; Alcácer 83'	Report		Stadium: Mestalla; Attendance: 40,000; Referee: Miguel Ángel Ayza Gámez

13 August 2011 Costa del Sol	Málaga (Spain)	4 – 0	(Uruguay) Peñarol	Málaga, Spain
21:30 CEST	Baptista 22'; Van Nistelrooy 43', 48'; Fernández 71'	Report		Stadium: La Rosaleda; Attendance: 16,000; Referee: José Luis Paradas Romero

14 August 2011 Teresa Herrera	Deportivo (Spain)	1 – 1 (3 – 4 p)	(Spain) Sevilla	A Coruña, Spain
20:00 CEST	Riki 5'	Report	Coke 85'	Stadium: Riazor; Attendance: 13,000; Referee: Jorge Valdés Aller
	Penalties
	Vázquez (penalty scored); Lassad (penalty scored); Álvarez (penalty scored); Colotto (penalty missed); Xisco (penalty missed)		(penalty missed) Manu; (penalty scored) Perotti; (penalty scored) Salva; (penalty scored) Trochowski; (penalty scored) Negredo

15 August 2011 Ciudad de Zaragoza	Zaragoza (Spain)	1 – 1 (4 – 3 p)	(Spain) Espanyol	Zaragoza, Spain
21:30 CEST	Obradović 83'	Report	Márquez 71'	Stadium: La Romareda; Attendance: 4,000; Referee: Carlos Delgado Ferreiro
	Penalties
	Ponzio (penalty scored); Lafita (penalty scored); Obradović (penalty scored); Juárez (penalty scored)		(penalty scored) Márquez; (penalty scored) S. García; (penalty missed) Albín; (penalty scored) Gómez; (penalty missed) Clerc

22 August 2011 Joan Gamper	Barcelona (Spain)	5 – 0	(Italy) Napoli	Barcelona, Spain
20:30 CEST	Fàbregas 26'; Keita 31'; Pedro 62'; Messi 66', 77'	Report		Stadium: Camp Nou; Attendance: 78,002; Referee: Alfonso Javier Álvarez Izquierdo

24 August 2011 Trofeo Bernabéu	Real Madrid (Spain)	2 – 1	(Turkey) Galatasaray	Madrid, Spain
22:30 CEST	Ramos 33'; Benzema 51'	Report	İnan 10'	Stadium: Santiago Bernabéu; Attendance: 81,000; Referee: Ignacio Iglesias Villanueva

== Honours ==
=== Trophy & League Champions ===
Competition	Winner	Details	At
La Liga	Real Madrid	2011–12 La Liga	San Mamés
Copa del Rey	Barcelona	2011–12 Copa del Rey	Vicente Calderón
Copa Federación de España	CD Binissalem	2011–12 Copa Federación de España; Beat SD Lemona on away goals after a 6–6 agg. (5–0 home and 1–6 away)	Arnolagusia
Segunda División	Deportivo	2011–12 Segunda División	
Segunda División B	Mirandés & Real Madrid Castilla	2011–12 Segunda División B	
Supercopa de España	Barcelona	2011 Supercopa de España; Beat Real Madrid 5–4 on agg. (2–2 away and 3–2 home)	Camp Nou

== League tables ==
=== La Liga ===
Pos	Team	Pld	W	D	L	GF	GA	GD	Pts	Qualification or relegation
1	Real Madrid (C)	38	32	4	2	121	32	+89	100	Qualification for the Champions League group stage
2	Barcelona	38	28	7	3	114	29	+85	91	Qualification for the Champions League group stage
3	Valencia	38	17	10	11	59	44	+15	61	Qualification for the Champions League group stage
4	Málaga	38	17	7	14	54	53	+1	58	Qualification for the Champions League play-off round
5	Atlético Madrid	38	15	11	12	53	46	+7	56	Qualification for the Europa League group stage (Note: Atlético Madrid won the 2011–12 UEFA Europa League and thus secured the title holder spot in the group stage of the 2012–13 UEFA Europa League.)
6	Levante	38	16	7	15	54	50	+4	55	Qualification for the Europa League play-off round (Note: Athletic Bilbao qualified for the third qualifying round of the 2012–13 UEFA Europa League as runners-up of the 2011–12 Copa del Rey to Barcelona, who have qualified for the 2012–13 UEFA Champions League. Consequently, Levante entered the play-off round.)
7	Osasuna	38	13	15	10	44	61	−17	54	
8	Mallorca	38	14	10	14	42	46	−4	52	
9	Sevilla	38	13	11	14	48	47	+1	50	
10	Athletic Bilbao	38	12	13	13	49	52	−3	49	Qualification for the Europa League third qualifying round
11	Getafe	38	12	11	15	40	51	−11	47 (Note: GET: 8 pts; RSO: 5 pts; BET: 2 pts)	
12	Real Sociedad	38	12	11	15	46	52	−6	47	
13	Real Betis	38	13	8	17	47	56	−9	47	
14	Espanyol	38	12	10	16	46	56	−10	46	
15	Rayo Vallecano	38	13	4	21	53	73	−20	43 (Note: RVA 0–0 ZAR; ZAR 1–2 RVA)	
16	Zaragoza	38	12	7	19	36	61	−25	43	
17	Granada	38	12	6	20	35	56	−21	42	
18	Villarreal (R)	38	9	14	15	39	53	−14	41	Relegation to the Segunda División
19	Sporting Gijón (R)	38	10	7	21	42	69	−27	37	Relegation to the Segunda División
20	Racing Santander (R)	38	4	15	19	28	63	−35	27	Relegation to the Segunda División

Source: ESPN
Rules for classification: 1st points; 2nd head-to-head points; 3rd head-to-head goal difference; 4th head-to-head goals scored; 5th goal difference; 6th number of goals scored; 7th Fair-play points
(C) Champions; (R) Relegated

=== Segunda División ===
Pos	Team	Pld	W	D	L	GF	GA	GD	Pts	Promotion, qualification or relegation
1	Deportivo La Coruña (C, P)	42	29	4	9	76	45	+31	91	Promotion to La Liga
2	Celta de Vigo (P)	42	26	7	9	83	37	+46	85	Promotion to La Liga
3	Valladolid (P)	42	23	13	6	69	37	+32	82	Qualification to promotion play-offs
4	Alcorcón	42	21	10	11	58	42	+16	73	Qualification to promotion play-offs
5	Hércules	42	22	6	14	62	43	+19	72	Qualification to promotion play-offs
6	Córdoba	42	20	11	11	52	43	+9	71	Qualification to promotion play-offs
7	Almería	42	18	16	8	63	43	+20	70	
8	Barcelona B	42	16	11	15	63	53	+10	59	
9	Las Palmas	42	16	10	16	58	59	−1	58	
10	Numancia	42	15	12	15	54	52	+2	57 (Note: ELC 2–2 NUM; NUM 3–0 ELC)	
11	Elche	42	17	6	19	56	58	−2	57	
12	Villarreal B (R)	42	14	10	18	54	64	−10	52	Relegation to Segunda División B (Note: Since first team Villarreal was relegated to the Segunda División, reserve team Villarreal B was automatically relegated to Segunda División B, whilst Sabadell was re-instated.)
13	Huesca	42	14	9	19	49	63	−14	51	
14	Xerez	42	13	11	18	50	66	−16	50	
15	Girona	42	12	13	17	58	61	−3	49 (Note: GIR 0–0 GUA; GUA 1–4 GIR)	
16	Guadalajara	42	14	7	21	50	75	−25	49	
17	Recreativo	42	12	11	19	49	52	−3	47 (Note: REC 0–2 MUR; MUR 0–3 REC)	
18	Murcia	42	13	8	21	49	67	−18	47	
19	Sabadell	42	11	13	18	45	64	−19	46	
20	Cartagena (R)	42	9	13	20	37	58	−21	40	Relegation to Segunda División B
21	Alcoyano (R)	42	9	10	23	46	78	−32	37	Relegation to Segunda División B
22	Gimnàstic (R)	42	6	13	23	37	58	−21	31	Relegation to Segunda División B

Source: LFP - Liga Adelante
Rules for classification: 1st points; 2nd head-to-head points; 3rd head-to-head goal difference; 4th head-to-head goals scored; 5th goal difference; 6th number of goals scored; 7th Fair-play points
(C) Champions; (P) Promoted; (R) Relegated
