= Germán Denis =

Argentine footballer (born 1981)

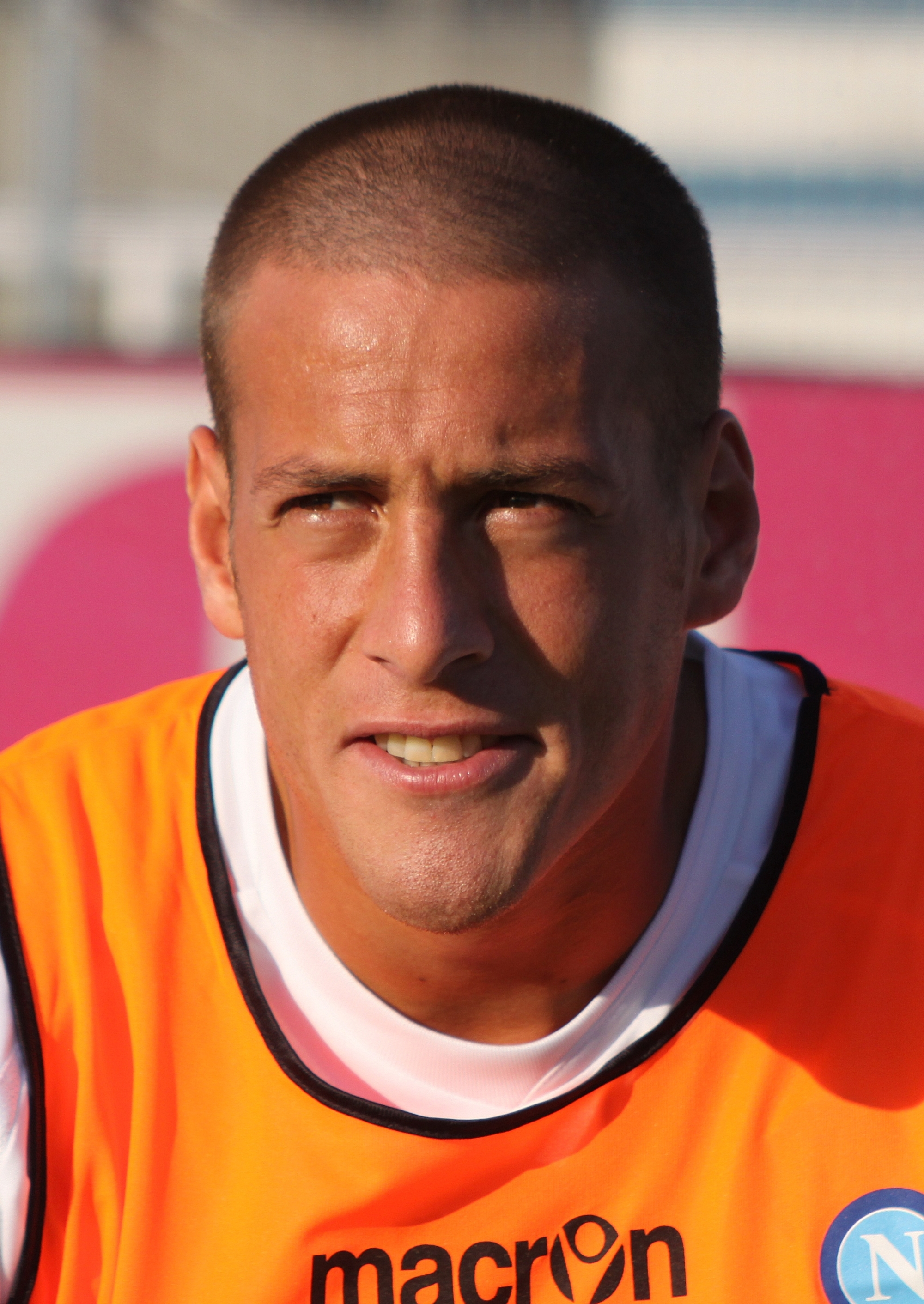
- Denis with Napoli in 2009

Personal information
- Full name: Germán Gustavo Denis
- Date of birth: 10 September 1981 (age 45)
- Place of birth: Remedios de Escalada, Argentina
- Height: 1.83 m (6 ft 0 in)
- Position: Forward

Senior career*
| Years | Team | Apps | (Gls) |
| 1997–1999 | Talleres RE | 33 | (25) |
| 2000 | Quilmes | 4 | (2) |
| 2000–2001 | Los Andes | 28 | (18) |
| 2002–2003 | Cesena | 29 | (3) |
| 2003–2005 | Arsenal de Sarandí | 54 | (13) |
| 2005–2006 | Colón | 36 | (11) |
| 2006–2008 | Independiente | 70 | (37) |
| 2008–2010 | Napoli | 63 | (13) |
| 2010–2012 | Udinese | 25 | (4) |
| 2011–2012 | → Atalanta (loan) | 33 | (16) |
| 2012–2016 | Atalanta | 120 | (40) |
| 2016–2017 | Independiente | 26 | (5) |
| 2017–2018 | Lanús | 24 | (5) |
| 2018–2019 | Universitario | 32 | (16) |
| 2019–2022 | Reggina | 62 | (17) |
| 2022–2023 | Real Calepina | 25 | (5) |
| 2023 | La Fiorita | 2 | (0) |
| Total | | 666 | (230) |

International career
| 2007 | Argentina | 5 | (0) |
- * Club domestic league appearances and goals

Germán Gustavo Denis (born 10 September 1981) is an Argentine former professional footballer who played as a forward.

== Career ==
Denis began his career in 1997 playing for his local team Talleres de Remedios de Escalada in Primera B Metropolitana, the regionalised third division of Argentine football.

In 2000, he moved to Primera newcomers Club Atlético Los Andes, in Lomas de Zamora, but the club was relegated at the end of his first season. He continued playing for them in Primera B Nacional until he was signed by Italian Serie B side Cesena.

In 2003, Denis made his return to Argentina and the Primera Division with Jorge Burruchaga's Arsenal de Sarandí. He played for them for two seasons before moving on to Colón. In summer 2006, he rejoined former manager Jorge Burruchaga at Independiente.

After scoring 15 goals in the first 13 games of the Apertura 2007 tournament, Denis was called up to join the Argentina national team for the first two matches of the 2010 FIFA World Cup qualification, against Chile and Venezuela. He made his debut with a brief substitute appearance against Venezuela on 16 October 2007.

=== Napoli ===
In June 2008 Denis signed for Italian Serie A club Napoli for a fee about €7.5285 million.

In his first appearance for the club, he scored a hat-trick as Napoli ran out winners in a friendly against Austrian side Jennersdorf. Napoli beat Jennersdorf 10–0. Denis scored his first official goal for Napoli against Vllaznia in the UEFA Cup, on 14 August 2008. He also scored once more in the UEFA Cup against Benfica. On 29 October, Denis scored the first hat-trick of his career in Serie A during Napoli's 3–0 victory over Reggina. However, new manager Donadoni preferred the Zalayeta-Lavezzi striking partnership, reducing Denis's playing time.

=== Udinese ===
Denis moved to Udinese for the 2010–11 Serie A season. He played the second leg against Arsenal in 2011–12 UEFA Champions League play-off round.

=== Atalanta ===
Upon achieving promotion from Serie B, Atalanta B.C. signed Denis on a season-long loan for the 2011–12 season. Denis scored 12 goals in 16 matches between the start of the season and the winter break. He then scored a hat-trick in a 4–1 victory against Roma on 26 February 2012, bringing his goal tally up to 15 for the season. Denis ended the season as the club's top scorer with 16 goals.

In November 2011, Atalanta director Pierpaolo Marino confirmed that Denis would join the club on a permanent deal after the end of the player's loan contract. On 19 June, the deal was finalized and Denis signed a three-year contract with the club for an undisclosed fee.

On 27 April 2015, Denis was banned for five matches after he burst into the opposition dressing room the day before and punched Empoli defender Lorenzo Tonelli.

On 30 January 2016, Denis scored on his final appearance for Atalanta, a 1–1 draw against Sassuolo, before returning to play for Independiente in Argentina. He is the joint-highest non-Italian goalscorer in the club's history in Serie A, alongside Duván Zapata, with 56 goals.

=== Later years: Reggina and Italian Serie D ===
Denis signed a two-year contract with Serie C club Reggina on 22 August 2019, making a return to Italy after three years. He was part of the squad that won promotion to Serie B, and played in the Italian second division with the Calabrians as well, before leaving Reggina by the end of the 2021–22 season.

=== Retirement, La Fiorita and Retirement ===
On 7 May 2023, Denis announced his retirement from football. However, on 24 June 2023, Denis confirmed that he came out of retirement and joined Campionato Sammarinese di Calcio club La Fiorita. After a few matches, Denis announced his retirement again from football.

== Style of play ==
A powerful striker, who is capable of playing anywhere along the front-line, and of using his physique to hold up the ball for teammates, Denis is known for his goalscoring, as well as ability in the air. During his time in Argentina, he was given the nickname el tanque, which means the tank in Spanish, due to his physical strength. He is also an accurate penalty taker.

== Career statistics ==
As of match played on 21 February 2018

Appearances and goals by club, season and competition
| Club | Season | League | | | Cup | | Other | | Total | |
| Club | Season | Division | Apps | Goals | Apps | Goals | Apps | Goals | Apps | Goals |
|---|---|---|---|---|---|---|---|---|---|---|
| Colón | 2005–06 | Argentine Primera División | 36 | 11 | 0 | 0 | 0 | 0 | 36 | 11 |
| Independiente | 2006–07 | Argentine Primera División | 34 | 10 | 0 | 0 | 0 | 0 | 34 | 10 |
| Independiente | 2007–08 | Argentine Primera División | 36 | 27 | 0 | 0 | 0 | 0 | 36 | 27 |
| Independiente | Total | | 70 | 37 | 0 | 0 | 0 | 0 | 70 | 37 |
| Napoli | 2008–09 | Serie A | 34 | 8 | 0 | 0 | 4 (Note: Appearances in UEFA Europa League) | 2 | 38 | 10 |
| Napoli | 2009–10 | Serie A | 29 | 5 | 2 | 0 | 0 | 0 | 31 | 5 |
| Napoli | Total | | 63 | 13 | 2 | 0 | 4 | 2 | 69 | 15 |
| Udinese | 2010–11 | Serie A | 25 | 4 | 2 | 1 | 0 | 0 | 27 | 5 |
| Udinese | 2011–12 | Serie A | 0 | 0 | 0 | 0 | 1 (Note: Appearance in UEFA Champions League) | 0 | 1 | 0 |
| Udinese | Total | | 25 | 4 | 2 | 1 | 1 | 0 | 28 | 5 |
| Atalanta | 2011–12 | Serie A | 33 | 16 | 0 | 0 | 0 | 0 | 33 | 16 |
| Atalanta | 2012–13 | Serie A | 36 | 15 | 2 | 0 | 0 | 0 | 38 | 15 |
| Atalanta | 2013–14 | Serie A | 37 | 13 | 1 | 0 | 0 | 0 | 38 | 13 |
| Atalanta | 2014–15 | Serie A | 32 | 8 | 1 | 0 | 0 | 0 | 33 | 8 |
| Atalanta | 2015–16 | Serie A | 15 | 4 | 1 | 0 | 0 | 0 | 16 | 4 |
| Atalanta | Total | | 153 | 56 | 5 | 0 | 0 | 0 | 158 | 56 |
| Independiente | 2016 | Argentine Primera División | 15 | 3 | 2 | 0 | 1 (Note: Appearance in Copa Sudamericana) | 0 | 18 | 3 |
| Independiente | 2016–17 | Argentine Primera División | 11 | 2 | 0 | 0 | 1 (Note: Appearance in Torneos de Verano) | 0 | 12 | 2 |
| Independiente | Total | | 26 | 5 | 2 | 0 | 2 | 0 | 30 | 5 |
| Lanús | 2016–17 | Argentine Primera División | 6 | 3 | 0 | 0 | 5 (Note: Appearances in Copa Libertadores) | 1 | 11 | 4 |
| Lanús | 2017–18 | Argentine Primera División | 11 | 2 | 2 | 0 | 3 | 0 | 16 | 2 |
| Lanús | Total | | 17 | 5 | 2 | 0 | 8 | 1 | 26 | 6 |
| Career total | | | 390 | 131 | 13 | 1 | 15 | 3 | 418 | 135 |

== Honours ==
Individual

- Primera División top scorer: 2007 Apertura
