= Joel Ekstrand =

Swedish former footballer

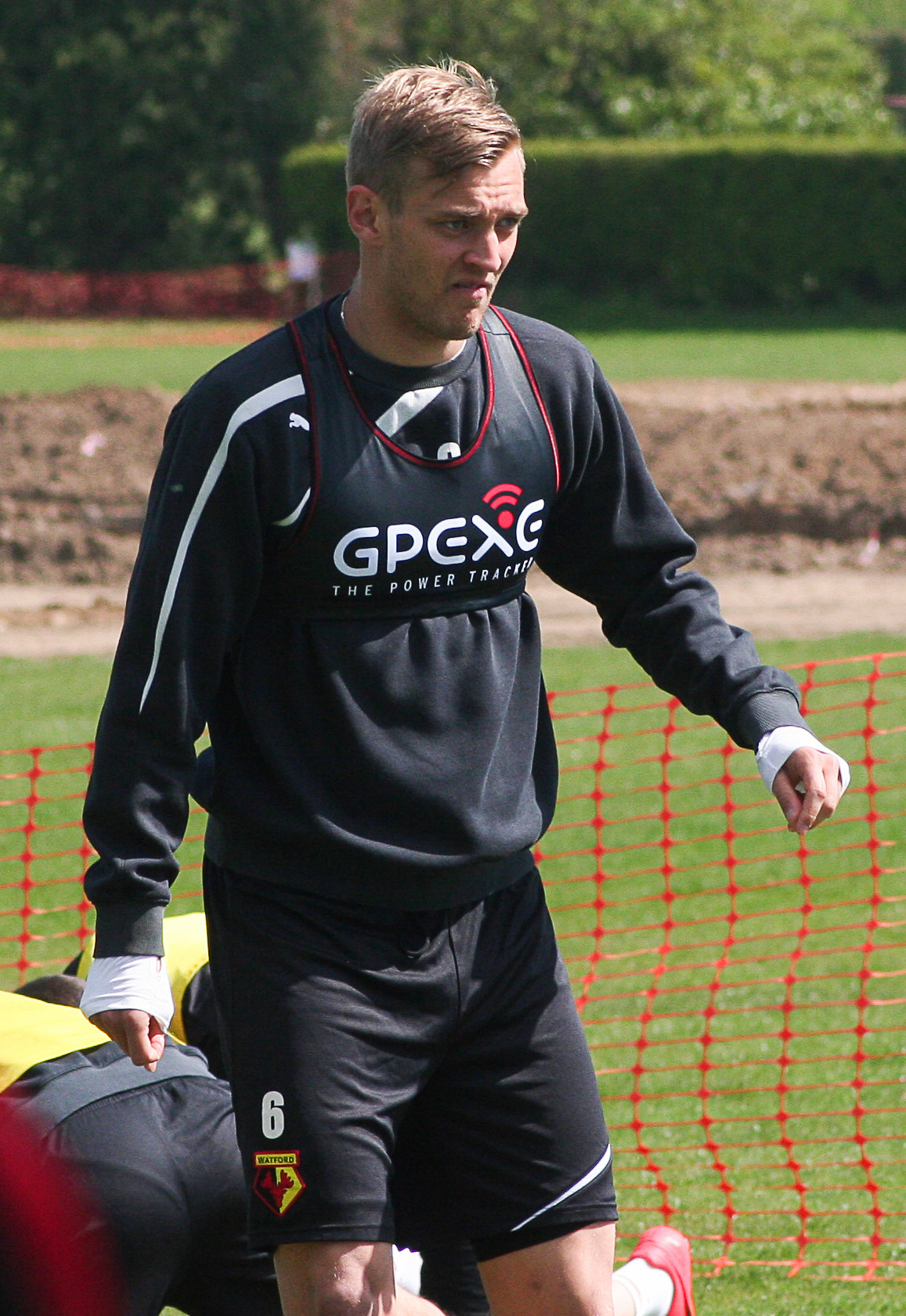
- Ekstrand in training with Watford.

Personal information
- Full name: Lars Hening Joel Ekstrand
- Date of birth: 4 February 1989 (age 37)
- Place of birth: Lund, Sweden
- Height: 1.88 m (6 ft 2 in)
- Position: Defender

Youth career
- 1997–2005: Lunds BK
- 2006–2007: Helsingborgs IF

Senior career*
Years	Team	Apps	(Gls)
2008–2011	Helsingborgs IF	73	(1)
2011–2013	Udinese	12	(0)
2012–2013	→ Watford (loan)	32	(1)
2013–2016	Watford	57	(1)
2016–2017	Bristol City	2	(0)
2017	Rotherham United	1	(0)
2018–2019	AIK	1	(0)
Total		178	(3)

International career
2004–2006	Sweden U17	5	(0)
2007–2008	Sweden U19	11	(0)
2009–2010	Sweden U21	9	(1)
2010–2014	Sweden	2	(0)
- * Club domestic league appearances and goals

Lars Hening Joel Ekstrand (born 4 February 1989) is a Swedish former professional footballer who played as a defender. Beginning his career with Helsingborgs IF in 2008, he moved on to represent Udinese, Watford, Bristol City, and Rotherham before retiring at AIK in 2019. A full international between 2010 and 2014, he won two caps for the Sweden national team.

== Club career ==
=== Helsingborgs IF ===
Born in Lund, Sweden, Ekstrand started playing football for his home town club Lunds BK as a youth player before moving to Helsingborgs IF in 2005. Two years later, he signed his first professional contract with the club in the summer.

In February 2008, Ekstrand was called up by the Helsingborgs IF squad for the first time, He made his first team debut against PSV Eindhoven in the first leg of the UEFA Cup Round of 32, at Philips Stadion, which saw Helsingborgs lose 2–0. Ekstrand was featured again in the second leg of the UEFA Cup Round of 32, at Olympia stadium and played 45 minutes before being substituted, due to a groin injury, as the club lost 2–1, resulting in their elimination from the tournament. But he soon recovered and made his league debut for Helsingborgs IF, starting the whole game, in a 3–0 win over GIF Sundsvall in the opening game of the season. During a 2–2 draw against IFK Norrköping on 20 April 2008, Ekstrand started the game but was substituted in the 7th minute following a collision and suffered a broken nose and concussion. But he quickly recovered and made his return to the first team from injury, starting the whole game, in a 4–2 win over Malmö on 28 April 2008. Since then, Ekstrand had developed himself into a key player at Helsingborg IF with the likes of Marcus Nilsson, Andreas Granqvist and Samir Beloufa. Despite missing three matches throughout the 2008 season, he went on to make twenty–eight appearances in all competitions. Following this, Ekstrand was nominated for the Newcomer of the Year but lost out to Robin Söder.

At the start of the 2009 season, Ekstrand helped Helsingborgs IF side go to their winning form in the first three league matches to the season. However, in a match against Örebro on 20 April 2009, he received a straight red card in the 44th minute, just one minute before the half–time, in a 2–0 loss. After serving a one match suspension, Ekstrand returned to the first team and provided a goal for Rasmus Jönsson, who went on to score a hat–trick, in a 3–0 win over AIK on 29 April 2009. This was followed up by helping the club keep two clean sheets in the next two matches against Malmö and IF Brommapojkarna. Following his return to the first team from suspension, he continued to regain his first team place for Helsingborgs IF, forming a centre–back partnership with Nilsson. On 11 June 2009, Ekstrand, along with Nilssson, signed a contract with the club, keeping him until 2012. He then scored his first goal for Helsingborgs IF in the second leg of the UEFA Europa League second round, in a 2–2 draw against Zestafoni to help the club advance to the next round. In a match against FK Sarajevo in the second leg of the UEFA Europa League third round, Ekstrand played 120 minutes, resulting in a penalty shootout with the opposition team winning 2–1 and missed the penalty, which saw Helsingborgs IF eliminated from the tournament. However, he received a straight red card in the 24th minute for giving away a penalty, in a 3–0 loss against Örgryte on 18 October 2009. Despite being sidelined, due to suspension and injuries much further, Ekstrand went on to make thirty–two appearances and scoring once in all competitions.

At the start of the 2010 season, Ekstrand was in defensive first team position when he helped the side go on unbeaten run for Helsingborgs IF's first twelve matches to the start season. While the club go on the unbeaten run, he received a straight red card in the first half, in a 1–0 win over Mjällby on 26 April 2010 and served a two match suspension. After returning to the first team, Ekstrand scored his first league goal for the club, in a 3–1 win over Gefle on 10 May 2010. Since returning from suspension, he continued to regain his first team place for Helsingborgs IF, forming a centre–back partnership with Nilsson and helping the club to keep their league title chance alive. However, Ekstrand faced further setbacks later in the 2010 season when he was suspended on two occasions, including another straight red card in a 0–0 draw against Göteborg on 15 August 2010, as well as, facing his injury concern. On 6 November 2010, he returned to the starting line–up in the Helsingborgs IF's last game of the season against Kalmar and played 76 minutes before being substituted, in a 1–0 draw but cost the club to win the league title, as title contender rival, Malmö FF, won the league following their win. In a follow–up match, Ekstrand started in the Svenska Cupen Final against Hammarby and helped Helsingborgs win the tournament by beating the opposition team 1–0 on 13 November 2010. At the end of the 2010 season, he went on to make twenty–five appearances and scoring once in all competitions. Following this, Ekstrand was nominated for the player's defender of the year but he lost out to Olof Mellberg.

With the 2010 season ended, Ekstrand was linked a move away from Helsingborgs IF, as clubs from Italy were keen on signing him. The club confirmed that Ekstrand was expected to leave the club. After a much speculation over his future, it was announced that Ekstrand joined Udinese in 2011.

=== Udinese ===
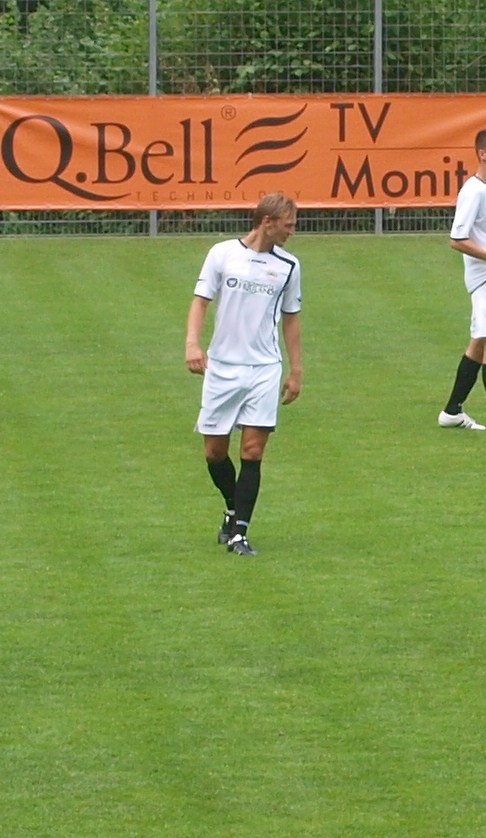
Ekstrand playing for Udinese in 2011.

On 18 January 2011, Ekstrand penned a four-year deal with Serie A side Udinese, keeping him through to 2015. Prior to the move, he spoke out about joining Udinese, quoting: "It has always been a dream. It is a big football country that took World Cup gold not long ago. Here are big clubs and the best Swedish is playing in Serie A. For me it will be an honor to join."

Since joining the club, however, Ekstrand found himself out of first team, as he mostly sat out from the squad, as well as, facing competition from Andrea Coda. On 8 May 2011, Ekstrand made his debut for Udinese, coming on in the 70th minute in a 2–1 win against Lazio. This turns out to be his only appearance of the 2010–11 season.

At the start of the 2011–12 season, Ekstrand made his first start for Udinese in a Champions League qualifying game against Arsenal. For this match, the club changed from the previous season's 3–5–2 formation to 4–1–4–1, where wing-backs Mauricio Isla and Pablo Armero became midfielders, thus using 4 defenders instead of 3 centre-backs. He remained in the starting XI in the return leg a week later with Udinese losing 2–1 (3–1 agg). However, he continued to find his first team opportunities limited and found himself placed on the substitute bench, due to competitions from Medhi Benatia and Danilo. But Ekstrand made only five starts by the end of the year, coming from the league and UEFA Europa League and saw the club qualify for the knockout stage. He then made a further five more starts for Udinese later in the 2011–12 season. At the end of the 2011–12 season, Ekstrand went on to make a further 17 appearances in all competitions.

==== Loan to Watford ====
On 31 August 2012, Ekstrand joined Championship side Watford on a season-long loan from Udinese. It came after when the player informed the club's management that he wanted to leave Udinese for first team football. Esktrand was close to joining Eredivisie side Groningen but collapsed over transfer demands.

Having been out of the first team for a month, he made his debut for the club, coming on in the second half to replace Neuton, in a 2–1 loss against Charlton Athletic on 2 October 2012. Following this, Ekstrand became a first team regular, playing in the centre–back position for the next sixteen league matches for Watford, as the club found themselves to get promoted to the Premier League. This lasted until he suffered a knee injury and was substituted in the 78th minute during Watford's win against Bolton Wanderers on 2 February 2013. His knee injury cost him a place to be in the Sweden squad and missed the next two matches as a result. Ekstrand made his return to the starting line–up against Ipswich Town on 18 February 2013 and helped the club keep a clean sheet, in a 2–0 win. In a follow–up match against Derby County on 23 February 2013, he scored his first Watford goal, scoring from 10 yards, in a 2–1 win. From that moment on, he began to established himself in the first team for the rest of the season and helped the club finish third place in league. On 12 May 2013, Ekstrand played in the semi-final second leg against Leicester City. In a dramatic finale, after Watford goalkeeper Manuel Almunia saved both a penalty taken by Anthony Knockaert and a rebound which would have sent the opposition team through to the final, Troy Deeney scored in the seventh minute of added time to take the club through to the Championship Play-off Final on aggregate. In the Championship Play–off Final, he played the whole game throughout 120 minutes extra time, as Watford lost the final against Crystal Palace. At the end of the 2012–13 season, Ekstrand went on to make 36 appearances and scoring once in all competitions.

=== Watford ===
On 24 July 2013, Watford confirmed Ekstrand had signed a three-year deal on a permanent basis, keeping him until 2016. Upon joining the club, he was given a number six shirt following the departure of Fitz Hall.

His first appearance for Watford since joining them on a permanent basis came on 6 August 2013, where Ekstrand captained the club and starting the whole game, in a 3–1 win over Bristol Rovers in the first round of the League Cup. Following this, he continued to remain in the first team regular for the club, playing in the centre–back position despite having two managers this season. Ekstrand then made his 50th appearance for Watford, starting the whole game, in a 2–1 win against Huddersfield Town on 5 October 2013. However, he suffered setback of injuries and suspension throughout the 2013–14 season. At the end of the 2013–14 season, Ekstrand went on to make thirty–nine appearances in all competitions.

Prior to the 2014–15 season, Ekstrand was keen on leaving Watford despite having a remaining two years to his contract. Amid the transfer speculation, Ekstrand made a poor start of the season when he was "sent–off after just two minutes for a collision with Nathan Redmond", in a 3–0 loss against Norwich City on 16 August 2014. After serving a three match suspension, he returned to the first team against Huddersfield Town on 30 August 2014, starting the whole game, in a 4–2 win. Since returning from suspension, Ekstrand continued to regain his first team place, playing in the centre–back position for the next thirteen league matches despite facing competitions along the way. However, by December, he was dropped from the first team squad by manager Slaviša Jokanović, due to his change of formation 3–5–2 tactics and Football League rules on home-grown player as the reason Ekstrand was dropped from the first team squad. By late–December, he faced his own injury concern that saw him out for a month. After returning to training from injury in February, Ekstrand returned to the starting line–up against Bolton Wanderers on 14 February 2015 and scored his first goal for the club in two years, in a 4–3 win. However, during a 3–2 win against Leeds United on 28 February 2015, he suffered a hamstring injury and was substituted in the 42nd minute, resulting in him missing the next two matches. But Ekstrand returned to the starting line–up against Reading on 14 March 2015 and helped Watford win 4–1. However, his return was short–lived when it was announced on 24 March 2015 that he would be out for up to nine months after damaging his cruciate ligament in a Football League Championship match against Ipswich Town three days ago. While on the sidelines, Watford gained promotion to the Premier League. At the end of the 2014–15 season, Ekstrand went on to make twenty–five appearances and scoring once in all competitions.

Following this, Ekstrand continued to rehabilitate with his knee injury and was dropped from the Premier League squad for the 2015–16 season. By late–November, he made his return to full training after making a recovery on his knee. Ekstrand then made a playing comeback from injury in January 2016 after being out injured since March 2015, playing two matches for Watford's development squad, however he picked up an injury in an against Boreham Wood on 26 January 2016. In February 2016, then Watford Manager Quique Sánchez Flores revealed the club were in talks to extend Ekstrand's contract at the club despite Ekstrand still recovering from injury, with Flores describing the player: "Ekstrand could be a very interesting central defender for the future. He has experience and plays football very well." However, Sánchez Flores' was denied by Ekstrand, saying he hasn't been offered a new contract by Watford but was keen on staying at the club. Ekstrand later said that injury was "the hardest eleven months of his career."

After failing to make a first team appearance during the 2015–16 season due to injury and his contract situation changing after a change in management with Quique Sánchez Flores leaving the club and being replaced by Walter Mazzarri, on 3 June 2016, it was announced that Ekstrand would leave Watford upon the expiry of his contract.

=== Bristol City ===
After leaving Watford, it was announced on 13 July 2016 that Ekstrand had been set to sign for Championship club Leeds United on a free transfer, however after a medical and negotiations with the player, Leeds then pulled out of the deal Following this, he later reflected his experience at his medical prior to joining Leeds United. On 6 September 2016, Ekstrand signed for Championship club Bristol City on a one-year deal, after training with the squad during August. He was previously linked with a move to the club before joining in favour of Leeds United, only for the move to broke down.

Ekstrand made his debut for Bristol City in the 2–2 draw with Rotherham United on 10 September 2016, coming on as a substitute for Scott Golbourne. His second appearance for the club came on 17 September 2016, making his first start, in a 1–1 draw against Derby County. However, he was soon sidelined with a hamstring injury and illness, keeping him out for several months. Even after returning from injury, Ekstrand remained out of the first team until his release by the club, which he only made two appearances for the club.

=== Rotherham United ===
On 2 February 2017, free agent Ekstrand signed for fellow Championship side Rotherham United on a deal until the end of the season.

He made his Rotherham United (and his only appearance) debut, making his first start for the side and played 68 minutes before being substituted, in a 5–0 loss to the hands of Cardiff City on 16 February 2017. This turns out to be his only appearance for the club, as Ekstrand suffered a knee injury and was sidelined for the rest of the 2016–17 season. He left Rotherham United at the end of his contract.

=== AIK and retirement ===
After leaving Rotherham United, Ekstrand was linked with a move back to Sweden, with IFK Göteborg keen on signing him, but the move was broken down over money problems. On 15 January 2018, he signed a 3-year contract with AIK, making his return to Allsvenskan and Swedish football for the first time in eight years. Upon joining the club, Ekstrand said: "I felt that I wanted to get started and come back to Sweden. AIK is a fantastic club and when I played in Helsingborg before, the away match against AIK was the best of the year. It feels perfect to be here and I will do everything to contribute to the team."

Ekstrand made his debut for the club, coming on in the 85th minute in a 3–0 win against Halmstads BK on 5 March 2018 in the Svenska Cupen match. However, he suffered an injury and was eventually for eight months. On 11 November 2018, Ekstrand made his return to the starting line–up against Kalmar, coming on in the 85th minute and played for the rest of the game, as AIK won 1–0, a victory that saw the club win the 2018 Allsvenskan. At the end of the 2018 season, he went on to make two appearances in all competitions.

During the club's training camp in Dubai in early–February, Ekstrand suffered a lower body injury that kept him out of games throughout the season. On 10 October 2019, he announced his retirement from professional football, due to his injury.

== International career ==
=== Youth ===
In July 2004, Ekstrand was called up to the Sweden U15 squad for the first time. A month later on 24 August 2004, he made his U15 national team debut, starting the whole game, in a 3–1 win against Finland U15. Ekstrand went on to make two more appearances for Sweden U15.

In March 2005, Ekstrand was called up to the Sweden U16 for the first time. He made his debut for the U16 national team, starting the whole game, in a 2–0 loss against Republic of Ireland U16 on 28 April 2005. This turns out to be his only appearances for Sweden U16. In March 2006, Ekstrand was called up to the Sweden U17 squad for the first time. He made his U17 national team debut, starting the whole game, in a 4–0 loss against Hungary U17 on 30 March 2006. This also turns out to be his only appearances for Sweden U17.

In August 2007, Ekstrand was called up to the Sweden U18 squad for the first time. He made his U18 national team debut, starting the whole game, in a 1–1 draw against Belgium U18 on 21 August 2007. Ekstrand went on to make three more appearances for Sweden U18. In October 2007, he was called up to the Sweden U19 squad for the first time. Ekstrand made his U19 national team debut, starting the whole game, in a 2–0 win against Finland U19 on 12 October 2007. He went on to make six more appearances for the Sweden U19.

In September 2008, Ekstrand was called up to the Sweden U21 squad for the first time, but did not play. But he made his U21 national team debut, starting the whole game, in a 2–1 loss against Belgium U21 on 27 March 2009. On 23 May 2009, Ekstrand was selected for the Swedish u21 squad competing in the 2009 UEFA European Under-21 Football Championship. Manager Jörgen Lennartsson said about the player: "Position-safe midfielder, good head player and very good passing player." Prior to the tournament, he scored his first goal for the U21 national team goal, in a 2–1 win against Estonia U21 on 9 June 2009. However, Ekstrand was featured on the substitute bench throughout the tournament, as Sweden U21 made it to the semi–finals. Following the tournament, he made two more appearances for the U21 national team by the end of the year. Ekstrand later made five more appearances for Sweden U21 the following year.

=== Senior ===
In December 2009, Ekstrand was called up by Sweden for the first time. He first appeared in the national squad as an unused substitute against Oman for the first time on 20 January 2010, winning 1–0. Ekstrand made his full Sweden debut in a friendly against Syria in 2010.

Ekstrand's performances with Watford were rewarded with a return to the Sweden squad for the friendly game against Argentina on 6 February 2013. However, he withdrew from the squad due to a knee injury. On 5 March 2014, he made his first Sweden appearance in four years, in a 2–1 loss against Turkey.

== Personal life ==
Following his move to Udinese, Ekstrand began to learn Italian three times a week and subsequently learned the language well. In May 2012, he was reportedly went to hospital after crashing his car following the club's party, but was released from the hospital and was fined by Udinese.

In an interview with Watford Observer, Ekstrand also revealed that he speaks English and grew up supporting Arsenal as a young kid.

== Career statistics ==
=== International ===
Appearances and goals by national team and year
National team	Year	Apps	Goals
Sweden	2010	1	0
Sweden	2011	0	0
Sweden	2012	0	0
Sweden	2013	0	0
Sweden	2014	1	0
Total		2	0
