= Damiano Ferronetti =

Italian footballer (born 1984)

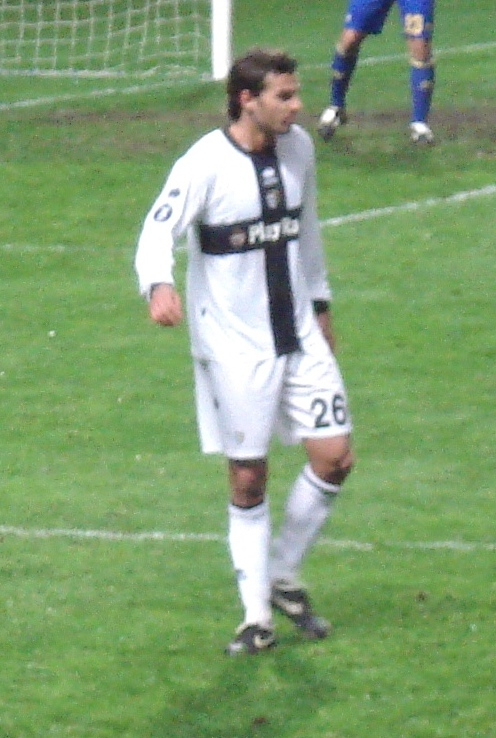

Personal information
- Full name: Damiano Ferronetti
- Date of birth: 1 November 1984 (age 41)
- Place of birth: Albano Laziale, Italy
- Height: 1.85 m (6 ft 1 in)
- Position: Centre back

Team information
- Current team: Rivignano

Youth career
- 2001–2002: Roma

Senior career*
Years	Team	Apps	(Gls)
2002–2004	Roma	1	(0)
2003–2004	→ Triestina (loan)	30	(0)
2004–2007	Parma	38	(0)
2007–2012	Udinese	56	(2)
2012–2013	Genoa	4	(0)
2013–2015	Ternana	30	(1)
2016–2017	Risanese		
2017–2018	Rivignano		

International career
2000–2001	Italy U-17	13	(0)
2002	Italy U-18	4	(0)
2001–2003	Italy U-19	8	(0)
2004–2006	Italy U-20	2	(0)
2004–2007	Italy U-21	4	(0)
- * Club domestic league appearances and goals

Damiano Ferronetti (born 1 November 1984) is an Italian former footballer who played as a left back. He could also play as a defensive midfielder.

== Club career ==
Ferronetti started his football career with A.S. Roma. He was loaned to Serie B team U.S. Triestina Calcio for the 2003–04 season.

=== Parma ===
In summer 2004, he was involved in Matteo Ferrari transfer, which half of the registration rights was sold to Parma F.C., for €750,000.

In June 2007, all of the rights was bought by Parma by a sum of €350,000.

=== Udinese ===
In August 2007 Ferronetti was sold to Udinese Calcio for €2 million, with Damiano Zenoni moved to Parma for €3 million.

In 2008–09 season, he competed the right-back position with Marco Motta as the left back were occupied by Aleksandar Luković and Giovanni Pasquale. In 2009–11 seasons he never played for two anterior cruciate ligaments injury, in the same knee.

=== Genoa ===
On 19 July 2012, he joined Torino F.C. on a two-year contract. 30 July 2012, left Torino. He was signe by Genoa C.F.C. on 31 August in a one-year deal.

=== Ternana ===
On 8 August 2013 Ferronetti was signed by Ternana in a one-year contract. His contract was renewed on 1 August 2014.

== International career ==
Ferronetti was a member of the Italy under-21 squad that took part at the 2006 UEFA European Under-21 Football Championship, but did not play any matches during the tournament. He started his national career at 2001 UEFA European Under-16 Championship (now renamed to U17 event but with the same age limit)
