= Pablo Armero =

Colombian footballer (born 1986)

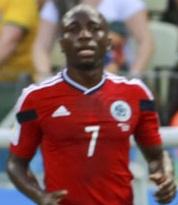
- Armero playing for Colombia in the 2014 FIFA World Cup

Personal information
- Full name: Pablo Estífer Armero
- Date of birth: 2 November 1986 (age 40)
- Place of birth: Tumaco, Colombia
- Height: 1.72 m (5 ft 8 in)
- Positions: Left-back; left midfielder

Senior career*
Years	Team	Apps	(Gls)
2004–2008	América de Cali	108	(6)
2009–2010	Palmeiras	36	(1)
2010–2013	Udinese	90	(3)
2013–2014	Napoli	33	(0)
2014	→ West Ham United (loan)	5	(0)
2014–2017	Udinese	8	(1)
2014–2015	→ Milan (loan)	8	(0)
2015	→ Flamengo (loan)	4	(0)
2017	Bahia	5	(0)
2018	América de Cali	25	(1)
2019	CSA	3	(0)
2019	Guarani	3	(0)
Total		328	(12)

International career
2008–2017	Colombia	68	(2)
- * Club domestic league appearances and goals

Pablo Estífer Armero (born 2 November 1986) is a Colombian former professional footballer who played as a left-back. He is known in Colombia by the nickname "Miñía", reportedly after a phrase commonly used to call infants in his hometown.

== Club career ==
=== America de Cali ===
Armero made his professional debut with América de Cali, and he was part of the squad that won the 2008 Finalizacion title against Independiente Medellín.

=== Palmeiras ===
After his performance with Colombia, and having helped América win their 13th championship, Armero was loaned to Palmeiras, his agent Turbo Sports holding the registration rights through Poços de Caldas. He was signed in early 2009, and was the first choice for Palmeiras left-back position. He helped Palmeiras reach the São Paulo State Championship semi-finals before losing to Santos. He was noticed for his speed and crossing abilities and played many matches helping Palmeiras lead in the Brazilian Série A. His only goal for Palmeiras came in a 4–1 win against Náutico in July 2009.

Having signed a pre-contract, Armero almost joined the Serie A side Parma in July 2010, but the deal collapsed on 3 July. Parma's lack of non-EU registration quota, reflected in the new ruling announced on 2 July, forced the contract to be terminated and obligated the club to pay a sum to the player. Instead, Parma signed Zé Eduardo. It was reported that Palmeiras bought 20% economic rights, (date unknown) and the non-dividable registration rights in June 2010. made Palmeiras would receive 20% transfer fee.

=== Udinese ===
On 28 August 2010, Udinese signed Armero. He became a left wingback ahead of Giovanni Pasquale in Udinese's 3–5–2 formation (or a 5–3–2 formation). That season Udinese finished fourth and returned to the UEFA Champions League.

Due to Udinese's UEFA coefficient, Udinese paired with seeded team Arsenal of the English Premier League. The team changed tactics, and Armero played as a left-sided wingback in its 4–4–1–1 formation, with new-signing Neuton playing new left-back. After his successful Serie A debut and following his appearances in European football, Armero was selected into the Serie A Team of the Year for the 2010–11 season.

Armero was rested for the first round of 2011–12 Serie A and started in his first UEFA Europa League match on 15 September. With the team changing its tactics back to 3–5–2, Armero remained left wing-back, also scoring the winning goal.

=== Napoli ===
On 9 January 2013, Armero joined Napoli on loan until the end of the season, with the option to make a permanent switch in the summer. He mostly made his appearances coming off the bench for the remainder of the 2012–13 season. During the 2013 summer transfer window, Napoli made the move permanent for a reported €4 million.

=== West Ham United (loan) ===
On 31 January 2014, Armero completed his loan move to West Ham United until the end of the season. He made his West Ham debut on 15 March in a 3–1 away defeat to Stoke City. With West Ham already losing 3–1, he was an 83rd-minute substitute for Andy Carroll. He played five league games for West Ham before his loan ended. His final game came on 19 April 2014 in a 1–0 home defeat by Crystal Palace. The only goal of the game was a penalty conceded by Armero whose performance was criticised by manager Sam Allardyce.

=== Return to Udinese and loan to Milan ===
On 20 June 2014, Udinese announced they had signed back Armero, a season after he left to Napoli.

On 11 August 2014, the club announced his loan move to Milan for the 2014–15 season.

=== Flamengo and Bahia ===
On 9 April 2015, he was loaned again, this time to Flamengo, until the end of the year. He debuted in a match against Avaí for the third round of the Brasileirão 2015.

Armero rejoined Italian club Udinese for the 2015–16 season, where he mostly appeared as a substitute. However, Armero was sold halfway through the 2016–17 season, having played only eight matches in three years.

On 24 December 2016, he joined Bahia, who was playing in Campeonato Brasileiro Série B at the time.

=== CSA ===
Armero joined Brazilian club CSA on 17 March 2019, but was released only two months later after being spotted at a nightclub on the eve of a league match.

== International career ==
Armero played for the Colombian under-17 team in the 2003 FIFA U-17 World Championship and was promoted to the senior team in 2008 for his form with América de Cali. He received his first cap in Colombia's 5–2 win over Venezuela and has won the spot of starting left-back for the national team. In March 2013, he scored his first goal for Colombia in a 5–0 victory over Bolivia.

In June 2014, he was named in Colombia's squad for the 2014 FIFA World Cup finals. Armero scored Colombia's first goal in a 3–0 win against Greece in the team's opening group game.

== Style of play ==
Described as a "box-to-box player" ("tuttocampista," in Italian) in the media, Armero was known for his versatility, team–play, and work-rate, and is capable of playing in several midfield positions; he has been used as a left–sided midfielder, as an attacking midfielder, or as an offensive–minded central midfielder, known as the mezzala role, in Italian football jargon, and has even been used as a left-back.

== Career statistics ==
Scores and results lists Colombia's goal tally first.

#	Date	Venue	Opponent	Score	Result	Competition
1.	22 March 2013	Estadio Metropolitano Roberto Meléndez, Barranquilla, Colombia	Bolivia	5–0	5–0	2014 FIFA World Cup qualification
2.	14 June 2014	Estádio Mineirão, Belo Horizonte, Brazil	Greece	1–0	3–0	2014 FIFA World Cup

== Honours ==
América de Cali

- Categoría Primera A: 2008–II

Bahia

- Copa do Nordeste: 2017

Individual

- Serie A Team of the Year: 2010–11
