= Franco Soldati =

Italian Commercial director (born 1959)

Franco Soldati (born 30 September 1959 in Udine) is an Italian Commercial director who has been serving as Executive President of Italian football club Udinese since 1999.
