= Thierry Doubai =

Ivorian footballer

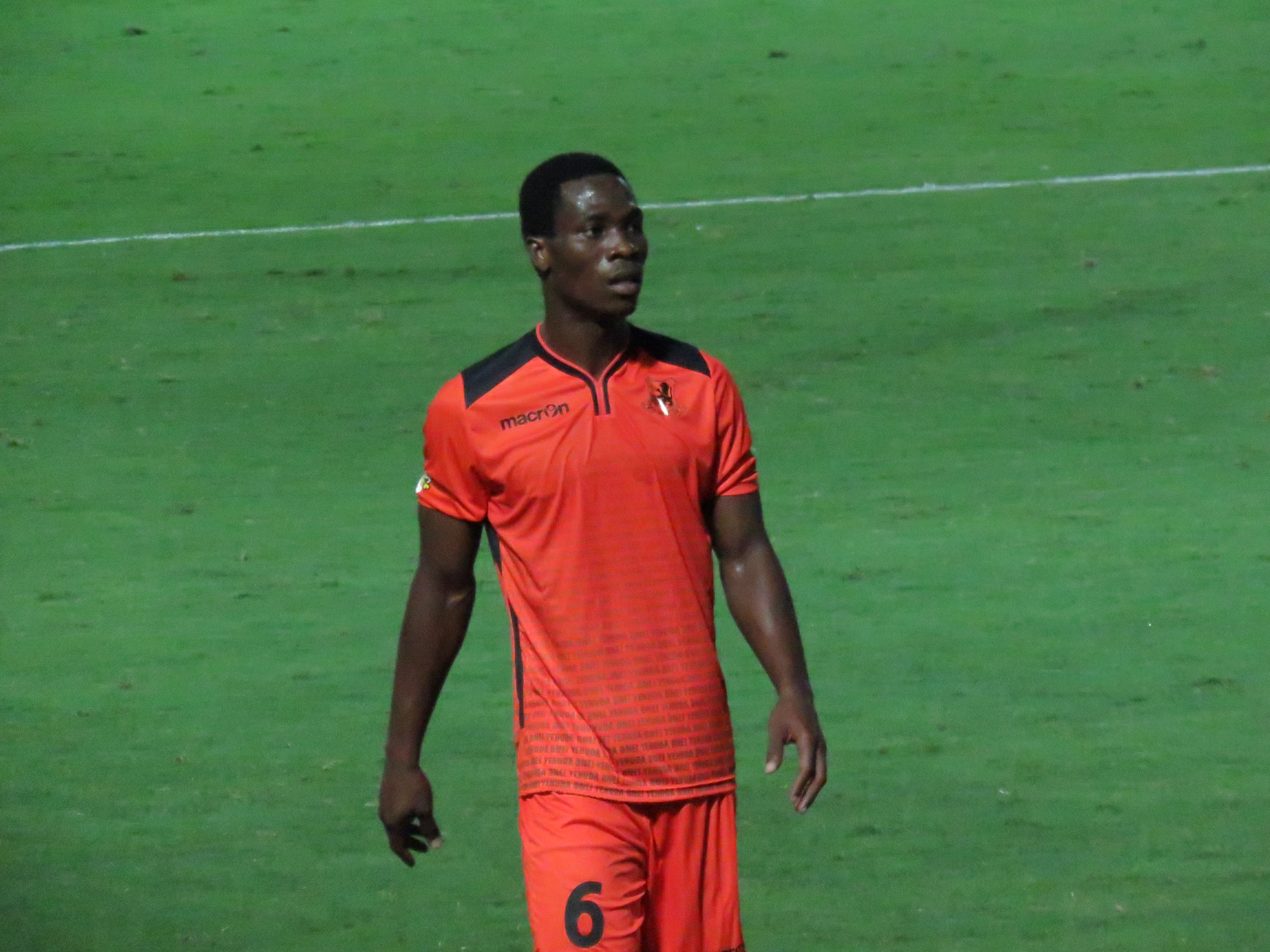
- Doubai playing for Bnei Yehuda in 2015

Personal information
- Full name: Moussé Doubai Tapé
- Date of birth: 1 July 1988 (age 38)
- Place of birth: Adjamé, Ivory Coast
- Height: 1.79 m (5 ft 10 in)
- Position: Midfielder

Senior career*
Years	Team	Apps	(Gls)
2005–2007	AS Athletic D'Adjame		
2007–2011	BSC Young Boys	77	(2)
2011–2012	Udinese	1	(0)
2012	→ Sochaux (loan)	10	(1)
2012–2014	Sochaux	38	(4)
2014–2015	FC Luzern	28	(1)
2015–2016	Bnei Yehuda Tel Aviv	18	(1)
2017–	AFAD		

International career
2008–	Ivory Coast	1	(0)
- * Club domestic league appearances and goals

Moussé Doubai Tapé or Thierry Doubai (born 1 July 1988 in Adjamé) is an Ivorian footballer who plays as a midfielder for Ivorian club AFAD.

== Early life ==
Doubai was born 1 July 1988, in Adjamé.

He is the older brother of the professional footballer Kouadio Pascal Doubaï, who also played for Young Boys. Kouadio Doubaï got 30 Swiss Super League games between 2010 and 2013.

== Career ==
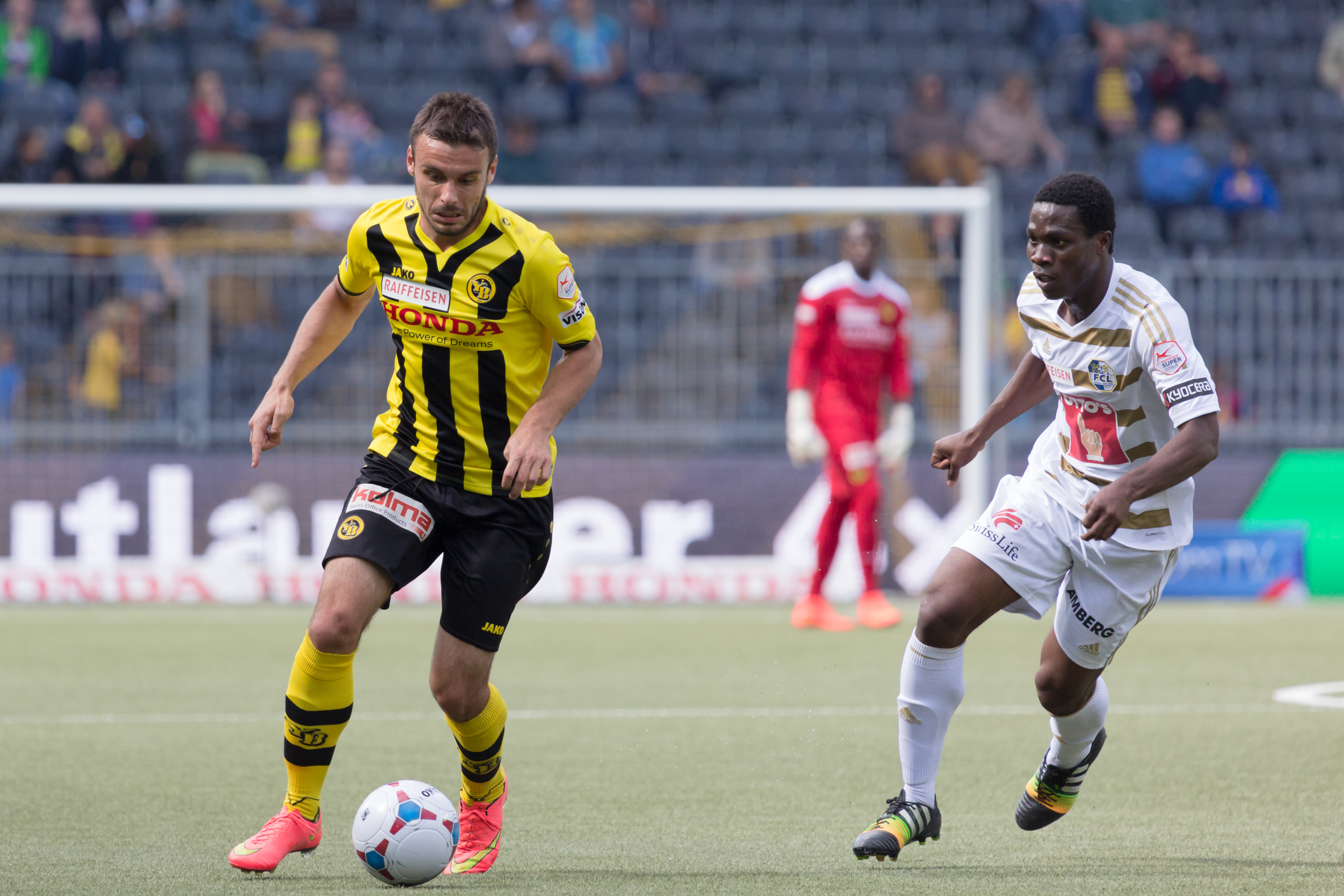
Doubaï, right

=== Young Boys ===
On 22 August 2007, BSC Young Boys signed Doubai from AS Athletic D'Adjame. In 2008, the 21-year-old Doubai was injured and has been left out for several months. In mid 2009, he returned in training and is very close to his comeback at the first team in Bern. He spent a four-year spell playing 77 matches for Young Boys with two goals.

=== Udinese ===
On 2 July 2011, Doubai agreed to a five-year contract with Serie A club Udinese.

=== Sochaux ===
Six months after signing with Udinese, on 17 January 2012, he joined French club FC Sochaux-Montbéliard on loan until the end of the season. Following the season, Sochaux took up the option to make the loan move permanent, signing Doubai to a four-year contract.

=== Bnei Yehuda F.C. ===
On 17 August 2015 Doubai signed with Bnei Yehuda Tel Aviv F.C. which was promoted to the Israeli Premier League. He made his Bnei Yehuda F.C. debut on 22 August and scored the first goal in a 3–0 away win against Maccabi Haifa F.C. at Sammy Ofer Stadium. Later on that season Doubai lost his place in the Bnei Yehuda line-up, and in July 2016 the team announced his release.

== International career ==
On 26 March 2008, Doubai made his debut for Ivory Coast against Tunisia.
