= Giampiero Pinzi =

Italian footballer

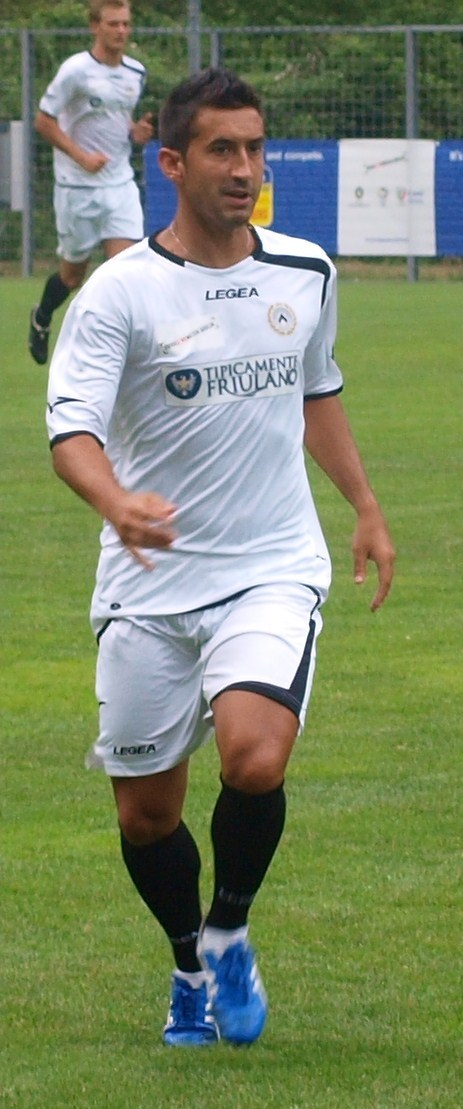
- Pinzi in 2011

Personal information
- Date of birth: 11 March 1981 (age 45)
- Place of birth: Rome, Italy
- Height: 1.76 m (5 ft 9 in)
- Position: Midfielder

Youth career
- 1997–1999: Lazio

Senior career*
Years	Team	Apps	(Gls)
1999–2000	Lazio	0	(0)
2000–2015	Udinese	286	(15)
2008–2010	→ Chievo (loan)	66	(4)
2015–2016	Chievo	18	(0)
2016–2017	Brescia	31	(1)
2017–2019	Padova	35	(0)
Total		436	(20)

International career
2001–2004	Italy U21	27	(3)
2005	Italy	1	(0)
Medal record
Representing Italy
Men's Football
Bronze medal – third place	2004 Athens	Team competition
- * Club domestic league appearances and goals

Giampiero Pinzi Cavaliere OMRI (Italian pronunciation: [dʒamˈpjɛːro ˈpintsi]; born 11 March 1981) is an Italian former professional footballer who played as a midfielder.

== Club career ==
=== Lazio ===
Pinzi came through Lazio's youth system, joining from Almas Roma, and was promoted to Lazio's first team in 1999. He made his senior debut in the UEFA Champions League on 2 November 1999, coming on in the match against Dynamo Kyiv. During the 1999–2000 season, he also made three appearances in the Coppa Italia for Lazio, winning both the Serie A title and Coppa Italia, although he did not feature in the league.

=== Udinese ===
After one-year with [Lazio in the Serie A Pinzi signed with league rivals Udinese.

=== Chievo ===
On 17 July 2009, Chievo announced that they would be keeping Pinzi on loan for another season.

=== Return to Udinese ===
Pinzi returned to Udinese for the 2010–11 Serie A season, after the departure of Gaetano D'Agostino and Simone Pepe. Pinzi formed the club's central midfield trio with the energetic Gökhan Inler and Kwadwo Asamoah in Udinese's new 3–5–2 (or 5–3–2 formation); he provided six assists.

After the departure of Alexis Sánchez, Pinzi changed to play attacking midfielder role, partnered with forward Antonio Di Natale in new 4–1–4–1 (or 4–4–1–1) formation, with Asamoah and Emmanuel Agyemang-Badu as cover against Arsenal. With the new signing Gabriel Torje and Diego Fabbrini arrived, Pinzi again formed a new partnership role with either or both players. After the departure of Torje and arrival of Maicosuel, Pinzi was still able to secure a place in starting XI.

In October 2012, he signed a new contract which lasted until 30 June 2016.

=== Return to Chievo ===
After 15 years played for Udinese, on 31 August 2015, the last day of transfer market, Pinzi returned to Chievo, where he had played between 2008 and 2010.

=== Brescia ===
On 10 August 2016, Pinzi signed for Serie B club Brescia on a free transfer.

=== Padova ===
On 8 January 2019, he was released from his contract by Padova by mutual consent.

== International career ==
With the Italy under-21 national team, Pinzi won the 2004 UEFA European Under-21 Championship and a bronze medal at 2004 Summer Olympics. He made his senior international debut and only cap for Italy in a friendly match against Iceland on 30 March 2005, coming off the bench in the 0–0 draw in Padova.

== Style of play and discipline ==
Pinzi was a versatile, hard-working, and physical right-footed midfielder, who primarily operated as a central midfielder in the mezzala role, although could also play in front of the defence as a defensive midfielder, or even behind the forwards as an attacking midfielder. He was known for his ability to read the game and provide balance to his teams by supporting the attack with his runs or by building attacking plays from deep, but also by providing defensive cover. He was also capable of playing on the right flank, a position in which he was deployed on occasion in his early career.

Pinzi was also known for his lack of discipline and tenacity on the pitch, and his resulting tendency to commit fouls and pick-up many cards throughout his playing career. With twelve red cards and 147 yellow cards in 389 Serie A appearances, he has the joint-second highest number of sending offs in Serie A history, and the most bookings in the league's history alongside Daniele Conti. He also has the most red cards resulting from double bookings in Serie A history (nine).

== Career statistics ==
=== Club ===
Appearances and goals by club, season and competition
Season	Club	League			Cup			Europe			Other			Total		Ref.
Season	Club	Comp	Apps	Goals	Comp	Apps	Goals	Comp	Apps	Goals	Comp	Apps	Goals	Apps	Goals	Ref.
Lazio	1999–2000	Serie A	0	0	CI	3	0	UCL	1	0	–			4	0	
Udinese	2000–01	Serie A	10	0	CI	3	0	UC	3	0	–			16	0	
Udinese	2001–02	Serie A	28	2	CI	5	0	–			–			33	2	
Udinese	2002–03	Serie A	29	2	CI	0	0	–			–			29	2	
Udinese	2003–04	Serie A	27	2	CI	2	0	UC	2	0	–			31	2	
Udinese	2004–05	Serie A	30	1	CI	2	0	UC	2	1	–			34	2	
Udinese	2005–06	Serie A	13	0	CI	1	0	UCL+UC	3+0	0	–			17	0	
Udinese	2006–07	Serie A	32	1	CI	3	1	–			–			35	2	
Udinese	2007–08	Serie A	13	0	CI	0	0	–			–			13	0	
Udinese	2010–11	Serie A	34	1	CI	1	0	–			–			35	1	
Udinese	2011–12	Serie A	28	2	CI	0	0	UCL+UEL	2+6	0	–			36	2	
Udinese	2012–13	Serie A	19	3	CI	1	0	UCL+UEL	2+3	0	–			25	3	
Udinese	2013–14	Serie A	23	1	CI	4	0	UEL	3	0	–			30	1	
Udinese	Total		286	15		22	1		26	1		0	0	334	17	–
Chievo (loan)	2008–09	Serie A	34	1	CI	0	0	–			–			34	1	
Chievo (loan)	2009–10	Serie A	32	3	CI	3	0	–			–			35	3	
Chievo	2015–16	Serie A	18	0	CI	0	0	–			–			18	0	
Brescia	2016–17	Serie A	31	1	CI	0	0	–			–			31	3	
Brescia	2017–18	Serie A	0	0	CI	1	0	–			–			1	0	
Brescia	Total		31	1		1	0		0	0		0	0	32	1	–
Padova	2017–18	Serie C	29	0	CI	0	0	–			–			29	0	
Padova	2018–19	Serie B	6	0	CI	0	0	–			–			6	ß	
Padova	Total		35	0		0	0		0	0		0	0	35	0	–
Career total			436	20		29	1		27	1		-	-	492	22	–

=== International ===
Appearances and goals by national team and year
National team	Year	Apps	Goals
Italy	2005	1	0
Total		1	0

== Honours ==
Udinese

- UEFA Intertoto Cup: 2000

Orders

- 5th Class / Knight: Cavaliere Ordine al Merito della Repubblica Italiana: 2004
