= Antonio Floro Flores =

Italian footballer (born 1983)

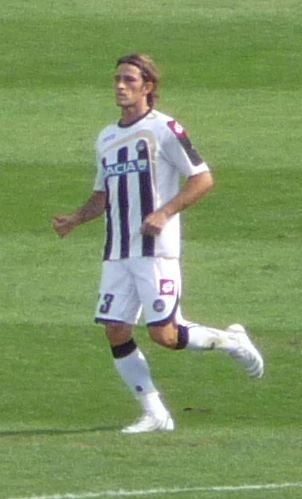
- Floro Flores in 2009

Personal information
- Full name: Antonio Mariano Floro Flores
- Date of birth: 18 June 1983 (age 43)
- Place of birth: Naples, Italy
- Height: 1.83 m (6 ft 0 in)
- Position: Striker

Team information
- Current team: Benevento (head coach)

Senior career*
Years	Team	Apps	(Gls)
2000–2004	Napoli	62	(3)
2004	→ Sampdoria (loan)	4	(1)
2004–2005	Perugia	27	(8)
2005–2007	Arezzo	79	(28)
2007–2013	Udinese	140	(26)
2011	→ Genoa (loan)	18	(10)
2012–2013	→ Granada (loan)	10	(1)
2013	Genoa	13	(2)
2013–2016	Sassuolo	72	(12)
2016	→ Chievo (loan)	14	(1)
2016–2018	Chievo	12	(0)
2017	→ Bari (loan)	13	(4)
2017–2018	→ Bari (loan)	27	(3)
2018–2020	Casertana	29	(4)
Total		520	(103)

International career
2002–2004	Italy U21	5	(1)

Managerial career
- 2021: Frattese
- 2022: Angri
- 2025–: Benevento
- * Club domestic league appearances and goals

Antonio Mariano Floro Flores (born 18 June 1983) is an Italian former professional footballer who played as a striker and currently works as the head coach of Serie B club Benevento.

== Career ==
=== Early career ===
Floro Flores was born in Naples and started his career at Napoli. He made his Serie A debut on 28 January 2001 against Roma. After six months on loan to fellow Serie A side Sampdoria, Floro Flores transferred to Perugia after Napoli had gone bankrupt. At Perugia, Floro Flores scored 8 goals in Serie B, and two more against Treviso in the promotion play-off second legs. But Perugia also faced bankruptcy, and Floro Flores joined Arezzo in the summer of 2005. He remained at the club for two seasons and scored 28 goals in 79 league matches.

=== Udinese ===
After Arezzo got relegated to Serie C1 in summer 2007, Floro Flores was signed by Udinese in a co-ownership deal. On 25 June 2008, Udinese bought Floro Flores outright. In January 2011, he was loaned to Genoa where he scored 10 goals in 18 matches. In August 2011 he signed a new five-year contract with Udinese. During the summer of 2012 he was sent on loan to Granada in La Liga. On 16 September 2012, Floro Flores scored his first goal for Granada in the 82nd minute against Deportivo to lead his side to a come from behind draw.

=== Genoa ===
In January 2013 he left for Genoa for a fee of around €6.3 million, made up of cash plus 50% of the registration rights of Masahudu Alhassan and Alexander Merkel which were valued at €1.5 million and €4 million respectively. However, he only scored 2 goals during the remainder of the season, 10 goals behind team top-scorer Marco Borriello.

In the 2013–14 season, Genoa sold Ciro Immobile and elected not to sign Boriello but Floro Flores found himself behind Alberto Gilardino who had been recalled from loan. Floro Flores was the substitute in the first game of 2013–14 Coppa Italia and the first round of 2013–14 Serie A; in the second round (1 September) Floro Flores was the starting forward. However, he was substituted in the 57th minute, as well as sold on the next day.

=== Sassuolo ===
On 2 September 2013, Floro Flores left for Sassuolo on a temporary deal for €1 million with an option to purchase. He retained his no.83 shirt number for his new team.

At the end of season Sassuolo bought Floro Flores and Davide Biondini outright, for €2.5 million and €1.3 million respectively.

=== Chievo ===
On 1 February 2016, Floro Flores was signed by Chievo in a temporary deal, replacing Alberto Paloschi. Chievo also had an obligation to buy at the end of season.

Floro Flores was loaned to Bari on 20 January 2017. On 13 July, the loan was renewed.

=== Casertana ===
On 29 January 2020, he announced his retirement from playing.

== Coaching career ==
A few months after retiring, on 20 August 2020, Flores was appointed head coach of Casertanas's U17 team, and was simultaneously also appointed as head of the youth sector of the club.

In 2024, he was named youth coach of Benevento, in charge of the Under-19 team. On 11 November 2025, he was promoted to head coach of the first team in the Serie C league, following the dismissal of Gaetano Auteri.
