= Giovanni Pasquale =

Italian footballer (born 1982)

Personal information
- Date of birth: 5 January 1982 (age 44)
- Place of birth: Venaria Reale, Italy
- Height: 1.91 m (6 ft 3 in)
- Position: Left-back

Team information
- Current team: Venaria Reale (manager)

Youth career
- Inter

Senior career*
Years	Team	Apps	(Gls)
2002–2006	Inter	36	(0)
2005	→ Siena (loan)	14	(0)
2005–2006	→ Parma (loan)	22	(0)
2006–2008	Livorno	67	(0)
2008–2016	Udinese	134	(4)
2013–2014	→ Torino (loan)	12	(0)

International career
2002–2004	Italy U21	5	(0)

Managerial career
- 2017–: Venaria Reale
- * Club domestic league appearances and goals

Giovanni Pasquale (born 5 January 1982) is an Italian football coach and former professional player who played as a full-back. He is the manager for the amateur side ASD Venaria Reale.

== Career ==
=== Inter ===
Pasquale started his career at Inter Milan. Due to Francesco Coco's performance, he gained a place in the first team. In January 2003, he signed a new contract for the club along with Nicola Beati and Obafemi Martins.

After the signing of Giuseppe Favalli, he was out-favoured by coach Roberto Mancini and sent on loan to Siena and Parma.

=== Livorno ===
Following Coco's failure to make a permanent move and subsequently returning to Inter Milan, Livorno signed Pasquale in a co-ownership deal, for €750,000. The co-ownership deal turned to a permanent one a year later, for €400,000. He was a regular player, but after the team was relegated again in June 2008, he was sold to Udinese, which qualified for the 2008–09 UEFA Cup.

=== Udinese ===
Although Udinese failed to qualify again for the UEFA Cup, the team signed Pasquale permanently from by-then Serie B promotion playoffs winner Livorno in June 2009, where he again played regularly, but he eventually became Aleksandar Luković's backup in the left-back position during the 2009–10 season, and played a few matches as left midfielder. In January, the team's formation was changed, in which Luković became centre-back, and Pasquale became left-back again, since the match against Napoli on 7 February.

In the 2010–11 season, he became backup to Pablo Armero, playing as a wing-back in a new 3–5–2 formation.

==== 2011–12 ====
After Udinese sold a vast number of players, the formation was again changed against Arsenal in the 2011–12 UEFA Champions League playoff round, with Armero as left midfielder and Neuton as new left-back. Pasquale played twice as a substitute. However, he was excluded from the 25-man squad for the 2011–12 UEFA Europa League.

Due to the exclusion from the European matches, he was a starter in the 2011–12 Serie A's first round, with Neuton as backup and Armero ailing in Udinese's landmark 3–5–2 formation, as the squad was changed to become more competitive in domestic and international competitions.

On 1 February 2012, Pasquale was reinstated to the Europa League squad. He played the first knock-out round as left winger in the 3–5–1–1 formation, with Armero moving to the attacking midfielder role.

In October 2012, he signed a new contract which would last until 30 June 2016, adding three more years to his previous contract.

==== Loan to Torino ====
In August 2013, he was loaned to Torino after the original signing Andrea Dossena failed his medical tests with the club. He debuted as a final substitute against Milan on 14 September 2013, conceding a penalty in stoppage time which gave Milan the opportunity to draw the game, which ended 2–2. Originally a backup player, he was inserted into the starting lineup after left-back Danilo D'Ambrosio was frozen out of the squad following a contract dispute.

However, his uninspiring performances soon led to him being dropped in favour of Salvatore Masiello, who was injured while warming up before the derby in February 2014 with Juventus. In the same month, Pasquale was also injured, prematurely ending his season with just 13 appearances.

== Career statistics ==
=== Club ===
As of 24 August 2011

Club performance			League		Cup		Continental		Total	
Season	Club	League	Apps	Goals	Apps	Goals	Apps	Goals	Apps	Goals
Italy			League		Coppa Italia		Europe		Total	
2002–03	Internazionale	Serie A	18	0	1	0	11	0	30	0
2003–04	Internazionale	Serie A	14	0	3	0	4	0	21	0
2004–05	Internazionale	Serie A	4	0	0	0	2	0	6	0
2004–05	Siena	Serie A	14	0					14	0
2005–06	Parma	Serie A	22	0	2	0			24	0
2006–07	Livorno	Serie A	32	0	0	0	6	0	38	0
2007–08	Livorno	Serie A	35	0	1	0			36	0
2008–09	Udinese	Serie A	28	3	2	0	10	0	40	3
2009–10	Udinese	Serie A	22	0	3	0			25	0
2010–11	Udinese	Serie A	17	0	2	0			19	0
2011–12	Udinese	Serie A	21	0	1	0	6	0	28	0
2012–13	Udinese	Serie A	18	1	0	0	5	2	23	2
2013–14	Udinese	Serie A	1	0	0	0	0	0	1	0
2013–14	Torino	Serie A	13	0	0	0	0	0	13	0
Career total			257	3	14	0	37	0	346	5
