= Neuton =

Brazilian footballer

Personal information
- Full name: Neuton Sérgio Piccoli
- Date of birth: 14 March 1990 (age 36)
- Place of birth: Erechim, Brazil
- Height: 1.82 m (6 ft 0 in)
- Position: Centre back

Youth career
- 2005–2008: Ypiranga
- 2008–2010: Grêmio

Senior career*
Years	Team	Apps	(Gls)
2010–2011	Grêmio	22	(1)
2011–2016	Udinese	4	(0)
2012–2013	→ Watford (loan)	8	(0)
2014	→ Chapecoense (loan)	9	(0)
2015–2016	→ Granada (loan)	0	(0)
2016	→ Albacete (loan)	0	(0)
2016–2017	Pistoiese	24	(0)
2017–2018	Doxa Katokopias	16	(0)
2018	Juventude	15	(0)
2019	Novo Hamburgo	0	(0)
2019	Londrina	0	(0)
2019	Botafogo-PB	4	(2)
2020	Ypiranga	2	(0)
2021	Azuriz	1	(0)
- * Club domestic league appearances and goals as of 18:29, 19 April 2020 (UTC)

Neuton Sérgio Piccoli (born 14 March 1990), simply known as Neuton, is a Brazilian professional footballer. Mainly a central defender, he can also play as a left-back.

== Career ==
=== Grêmio ===
Born in Erechim, Rio Grande do Sul, Neuton joined Gremio's youth setup in 2008, after starting it out at Ypiranga de Erechim. He made his debut for the club on 25 April 2010, playing the full 90 minutes in a 2–0 away victory over Internacional for the Campeonato Gaúcho championship.

Neuton made his Série A debut on 8 May, starting in a 0–0 draw at Atlético Goianiense. He scored his first professional goal on 20 November, netting the first in a 3–1 home win against Atlético Paranaense.

=== Udinese ===
On 28 July 2011, Neuton joined Serie A side Udinese on a five-year contract. He made his debut for the club on 16 August, starting in a 0–1 loss to Arsenal in that season's UEFA Champions League.

Neuton made his league debut, on 11 September 2011, coming on as a late substitute in a 2–0 win over Lecce. However, he only appeared in four league games during the campaign.

==== Watford (loan) ====
Neuton joined Watford on a season's loan on 31 August 2012. He made his debut in a 2–1 defeat at Bolton Wanderers on 15 September. He subsequently stated that he "can do much better" in October, but still appeared in only eight league games in the season.

==== Chapecoense (loan) ====
On 2 April 2014, Neuton joined newly promoted side Chapecoense on loan until December. Mainly a backup to Douglas Grolli and Jailton, he was only utilized in nine matches before being released in November.

==== Granada, Albacete (loans) ====
On 31 August 2015, Neuton was loaned to La Liga side Granada CF, for one year. On 1 February of the following year, after making no league appearances, he joined Albacete Balompié on loan until June.

=== Later years ===
In September 2016, Neuton signed with Italian third-tier club Pistoiese. On 31 August 2017, he switched clubs and countries and moved to Cypriot club Doxa Katokopias. On 5 April 2018, he returned to his native country and signed with second-tier club Juventude.

== Career statistics ==
As of match played on 2 May 2018

Appearances and goals by club, season and competition
Club	Season	League			Cup		Continental		Other		Total	
Club	Season	Division	Apps	Goals	Apps	Goals	Apps	Goals	Apps	Goals	Apps	Goals
Grêmio	2010	Série A	14	1	2	0	1 (Note: Appearance in Copa Sudamericana)	0	2 (Note: Appearances in Campeonato Gaucho)	0	19	1
Grêmio	2011	Série A	8	0	0	0	1	0	8	0	17	0
Grêmio	Total		22	1	2	0	2	0	10	0	36	1
Udinese	2011–12	Serie A	4	0	0	0	5 (Note: Appearances in UEFA Europa League and UEFA Champions League)	0	—		9	0
Udinese	2012–13	Serie A	0	0	0	0	—		—		0	0
Udinese	2013–14	Serie A	0	0	0	0	—		—		0	0
Udinese	2014–15	Serie A	0	0	0	0	—		—		0	0
Udinese	2015–16	Serie A	0	0	0	0	—		—		0	0
Udinese	Total		4	0	0	0	5	0	—		9	0
Watford (loan)	2012–13	Championship	8	0	1	0	—		—		9	0
Chapecoense (loan)	2014	Série A	9	0	1	0	—		—		10	0
Granada (loan)	2015–16	La Liga	0	0	2	0	—		—		2	0
Albacete (loan)	2015–16	Segunda División	0	0	0	0	—		—		0	0
Pistoiese	2016–17	Serie C	24	0	0	0	—		—		24	0
Doxa Katokopias	2017–18	Cypriot First Division	16	0	1	0	—		—		17	0
Juventude	2018	Série B	1	0	0	0	—		—		1	0
Career total			84	1	7	0	7	0	10	0	108	1

== Honours ==
Grêmio

- Campeonato Gaúcho: 2010
