= 2012–13 Udinese Calcio season =

Udinese
2012–13 season
- President: Franco Soldati
- Manager: Francesco Guidolin
- Stadium: Stadio Friuli
- Serie A: 5th
- Coppa Italia: Round of 16
- UEFA Champions League: Play-off round
- UEFA Europa League: Group stage
- Top goalscorer: League: Antonio Di Natale (23); All: Antonio Di Natale (26)
- Highest home attendance: 27,543 vs Juventus (2 September 2012, Serie A)
- Lowest home attendance: 6,190 vs Young Boys (8 November 2012, Europa League)
- Average home league attendance: 15,506
Home colours	Away colours	Third colours

The 2012–13 season was Udinese Calcio's 33rd season in Serie A, and their 18th consecutive season in the top-flight. Having finished 3rd in the 2011–12 Serie A, the team qualified for the play-off round of the 2012–13 UEFA Champions League. Defeated by Braga, Udinese dropped down to the group stage of the UEFA Europa League. The club also competed in Serie A and the Coppa Italia.

== Kit ==
Home	Home Alt.	Away	Third

== Players ==
=== Squad information ===
As of 14 August 2012

Note: Flags indicate national team as defined under FIFA eligibility rules; some limited exceptions apply. Players may hold more than one non-FIFA nationality.

No.	Pos.	Nation	Player
1	GK	SRB	Željko Brkić
3	MF	BRA	Allan
5	DF	BRA	Danilo
6	DF	ITA	Marco Faraoni
7	MF	GHA	Emmanuel Agyemang-Badu
8	DF	SRB	Dušan Basta
9	FW	BRA	Barreto
10	FW	ITA	Antonio Di Natale (captain)
11	DF	ITA	Maurizio Domizzi
13	DF	BRA	Neuton
16	DF	ITA	Andrea Coda
17	DF	MAR	Medhi Benatia
18	MF	ITA	Cristian Battocchio

No.	Pos.	Nation	Player
22	GK	VEN	Rafael Romo
24	FW	COL	Luis Muriel
26	DF	ITA	Giovanni Pasquale
27	DF	COL	Pablo Armero
31	FW	ITA	Diego Fabbrini
34	DF	BRA	Gabriel Silva
37	MF	ARG	Roberto Pereyra
66	MF	ITA	Giampiero Pinzi
75	DF	FRA	Thomas Heurtaux
77	MF	BRA	Maicosuel
88	MF	BRA	Willians
93	GK	POL	Wojciech Pawłowski
94	DF	POL	Piotr Zieliński

== Transfers ==
=== Contract renewals ===
Date	Player name	Position	Contract ends	Source
22 June 2012	Andrea Coda	Defender	30 June 2017	
4 July 2012	Antonio Di Natale	Forward	30 June 2014	
7 July 2012	Maurizio Domizzi	Defender	30 June 2015	

== Pre-season and friendlies ==
19 July 2012 Friendly	Udinese (Italy)	10–0	(Italy) Arta/Cedarchis	Arta Terme, Italy
18:00 CEST (UTC+02:00)	Muriel 16', 34', 40', 50' (pen.); Fabbrini 32'; Maicosuel 62', 70'; Beleck 75'; Pasquale 78'; Angella 87'			Stadium: Campo Sportivo Paolo Zuliani; Attendance: 300; Referee: Del Toso

22 July 2012 Friendly	Udinese (Italy)	8–0	(Italy) Rappresentativa Regionale Juniores del Friuli-Venezia Giulia	Imponzo, Italy
18:00 CEST (UTC+02:00)	Fabbrini 1'; Muriel 3' (pen.), 21', 35', 38'; Pasquale 4'; Badu 45'; Pereyra 58'			Stadium: Campo Sportivo Sergio Pittoni; Attendance: 1,500; Referee: Marini

25 July 2012 Friendly	Udinese (Italy)	4–0	(Italy) Portosummaga	Villa Santina, Italy
18:15 CEST (UTC+02:00)	Barreto 20'; Muriel 62', 74'; Maicosuel 67'			Stadium: Campo Sportivo Ai Pini; Attendance: 1,500; Referee: Ros

28 July 2012 Friendly	Atalanta (Italy)	1–0	(Italy) Udinese	Bergamo, Italy
20:45 CEST (UTC+02:00)	Tiribocchi 85'			Stadium: Stadio Atleti Azzurri d'Italia; Referee: Massimiliano Irrati

1 August 2012 Friendly	Udinese (Italy)	1–2	(Turkey) Antalyaspor	Villa Santina, Italy
18:00 CEST (UTC+02:00)	Maicosuel 81'		Boyraz 43'; Promise 89'	Stadium: Campo Sportivo Ai Pini; Referee: Tommasi

5 August 2012 Friendly	Udinese (Italy)	0–0	(Germany) Schalke 04	Klagenfurt, Austria
15:35 CEST (UTC+02:00)				Stadium: Wörtherseestadion

11 August 2012 Friendly	Southampton (England)	0–4	(Italy) Udinese	Southampton, England
20:00 CEST (UTC+02:00)			Di Natale 12', 35'; Willians 24'; Muriel 65'	Stadium: St Mary's Stadium; Referee: Mike Dean (England)

14 August 2012 Friendly	Chievo (Italy)	2–2	(Italy) Udinese	Mogliano Veneto, Italy
18:00 CEST (UTC+02:00)	Luciano 3'; Moscardelli 25'		Domizzi 5'; Faraoni 46'	Stadium: Stadio Mogliano Veneto; Referee: Piero Giacomelli

8 September 2012 Friendly	Udinese (Italy)	1–1	(Croatia) HNK Rijeka	Udine, Italy
16:00 CEST (UTC+02:00)	Barreto 25'		Benko 46'	Stadium: Stadio Friuli; Referee: Rasia

== Competitions ==
=== Serie A ===
==== League table ====
Pos	Team	Pld	W	D	L	GF	GA	GD	Pts	Qualification or relegation
3	Milan	38	21	9	8	67	39	+28	72	Qualification for the Champions League play-off round
4	Fiorentina	38	21	7	10	72	44	+28	70	Qualification for the Europa League play-off round
5	Udinese	38	18	12	8	59	45	+14	66	Qualification for the Europa League third qualifying round
6	Roma	38	18	8	12	71	56	+15	62	
7	Lazio	38	18	7	13	51	42	+9	61	Qualification for the Europa League group stage (Note: Lazio qualified for the 2013–14 UEFA Europa League group stage after winning 2012–13 Coppa Italia.)

Source: Serie A, Soccerway
Rules for classification: 1st points; 2nd head-to-head points; 3rd head-to-head goal difference; 4th goal difference; 5th number of goals scored; 6th public draw.
(Head-to-head record is applied for clubs with the same number of points only once all matches between said clubs have been played)

==== Matches ====
25 August 2012 1	Fiorentina	2–1	Udinese	Florence
18:00 CEST (UTC+02:00)	Jovetić 67', 90', (yellow card) 89'; Cuadrado (yellow card) 80'	Report	Maicosuel 28'; Danilo (yellow card) 87'	Stadium: Stadio Artemio Franchi; Attendance: 24,601; Referee: Paolo Mazzoleni

2 September 2012 2	Udinese	1–4	Juventus	Udine
18:00 CEST (UTC+02:00)	Brkić (red card) 12'; Pinzi (yellow card) 17'; Armero (yellow card) 34'; Domizzi (yellow card) 77'; Lazzari 78'	Report	Vidal 14' (pen.); Marchisio (yellow card) 37'; Bonucci (yellow card) 40'; Vučinić 45+1'; Giovinco 53', 71'; Matri (yellow card) 85'	Stadium: Stadio Friuli; Attendance: 27,543; Referee: Paolo Valeri

16 September 2012 3	Siena	2–2	Udinese	Siena
15:00 CEST (UTC+02:00)	Neto (yellow card) 52'; Calaiò 70'; Zé Eduardo 77' (pen.), (yellow card) 87'	Report	Lazzari (yellow card) 3' (yellow-red card) 52'; Basta 3'; Di Natale 5'; Danilo (yellow card) 61'; Domizzi (yellow card) 81'	Stadium: Stadio Artemio Franchi – Montepaschi Arena; Attendance: 7,831; Referee: Andrea De Marco

23 September 2012 4	Udinese	2–1	Milan	Udine
15:00 CEST (UTC+02:00)	Ranégie 40'; Di Natale 68' (pen.); Pinzi (yellow card) 77'; Coda (yellow card) 80'	Report	Ambrosini (yellow card) 40'; El Shaarawy 54'; Zapata (yellow card) 64' (yellow-red card) 67'; Boateng (yellow card) 75' (yellow-red card) 82'	Stadium: Stadio Friuli; Attendance: 22,976; Referee: Domenico Celi

26 September 2012 5	Torino	0–0	Udinese	Turin
20:45 CEST (UTC+02:00)	Meggiorini (yellow card) 28'	Report		Stadium: Stadio Olimpico di Torino; Attendance: 12,232; Referee: Daniele Orsato

29 September 2012 6	Udinese	0–0	Genoa	Udine
12:30 CEST (UTC+02:00)	Pinzi (yellow card) 80'	Report	Kucka (yellow card) 18'; Borriello (yellow card) 88'	Stadium: Stadio Friuli; Attendance: 15,396; Referee: Andrea Romeo

7 October 2012 7	Napoli	2–1	Udinese	Naples
20:45 CEST (UTC+02:00)	Hamšík (yellow card) 27', (goal) 30'; Pandev 45+1'; Maggio (yellow card) 83'	Report	Pinzi 43'; Danilo (yellow card) 70'; Maicosuel (yellow card) 74'; Benatia (yellow card) 78'	Stadium: Stadio San Paolo; Attendance: 43,148; Referee: Daniele Doveri

21 October 2012 8	Udinese	1–0	Pescara	Udine
15:00 CEST (UTC+02:00)	Danilo (yellow card) 13' (yellow-red card) 30'; Maicosuel 53'	Report	Blasi (yellow card) 7'; Balzano (yellow card) 68'; Cascione (yellow card) 81'	Stadium: Stadio Friuli; Attendance: 17,872; Referee: Antonio Danilo Giannoccaro

28 October 2012 9	Roma	2–3	Udinese	Rome
20:45 CET (UTC+01:00)	Lamela 22', 24', (yellow card) 54'; Osvaldo (yellow card) 50'; Castán (yellow card) 86'; Tachtsidis (yellow card) 90+2' (yellow-red card) 90+2'	Report	Domizzi 32', (yellow card) 44'; Angella (yellow card) 34'; Di Natale 50', 88' (pen.); Armero (yellow card) 82'; Badu (yellow card) 90+3'	Stadium: Stadio Olimpico; Attendance: 36,470; Referee: Davide Massa

31 October 2012 10	Udinese	2–2	Catania	Udine
20:45 CET (UTC+01:00)	Coda (yellow card) 20'; Di Natale 29' (pen.), 90+2'; Danilo (yellow card) 85'	Report	Spolli (yellow card) 28'; Bellusci (yellow card) 44'; Biagianti (yellow card) 54'; Castro 62'; Lodi 85'	Stadium: Stadio Friuli; Attendance: 16,474; Referee: Gianluca Rocchi

4 November 2012 11	Bologna	1–1	Udinese	Bologna
15:00 CET (UTC+01:00)	Antonsson (yellow card) 37'; Gabbiadini (yellow card) 45'; Diamanti 46'; Abero (yellow card) 48'; Sørensen (yellow card) 85'	Report	Domizzi (yellow card) 16'; Allan (yellow card) 39'; Angella (yellow card) 68'; Di Natale 73'	Stadium: Stadio Renato Dall'Ara; Attendance: 23,909; Referee: Mauro Bergonzi

11 November 2012 12	Chievo	2–2	Udinese	Verona
15:00 CET (UTC+01:00)	Rigoni (yellow card) 8'; Hetemaj (yellow card) 34'; Andreolli 38'; Paloschi 89' (pen.)	Report	Angella 42', 90+1'; Di Natale (yellow card) 45+4'; Lazzari (yellow card) 46'; Danilo (yellow card) 67' (yellow-red card) 87'; Pereyra (yellow card) 82'; Allan (yellow card) 88'	Stadium: Stadio Marc'Antonio Bentegodi; Attendance: 9,500; Referee: Daniele Doveri

18 November 2012 13	Udinese	2–2	Parma	Udine
15:00 CET (UTC+01:00)	Di Natale 9'; Allan (yellow card) 34'; Pereyra 50'; Domizzi (yellow card) 70'	Report	Parolo (yellow card) 11'; Marchionni 46'; Lucarelli (yellow card) 62'; Paletta (yellow card) 67'; Palladino 89'	Stadium: Stadio Friuli; Attendance: 17,860; Referee: Carmine Russo

27 November 2012 14	Lazio	3–0	Udinese	Rome
20:45 CET (UTC+01:00)	González 17'; Klose 31'; Ledesma (yellow card) 39'; Hernanes 59'; Cana (yellow card) 84'	Report	Coda (yellow card) 58'; Maicosuel (yellow card) 90+2'	Stadium: Stadio Olimpico; Attendance: 26,023; Referee: Gianpaolo Calvarese

2 December 2012 15	Udinese	4–1	Cagliari	Udine
15:00 CET (UTC+01:00)	Pereyra 33'; Angella (yellow card) 35', (goal) 39'; Danilo 48'; Pasquale 66'	Report	Nenê (yellow card) 33'; Ekdal (yellow card) 42'; Dessena (yellow card) 52', (goal) 80'; Cossu (yellow card) 75'; Nainggolan (yellow card) 84'	Stadium: Stadio Friuli; Attendance: 16,734; Referee: Dino Tommasi

10 December 2012 16	Sampdoria	0–2	Udinese	Genoa
19:00 CET (UTC+01:00)	Gastaldello (yellow card) 35'; Pozzi (yellow card) 54'	Report	Danilo 17'; Di Natale 28'; Heurtaux (yellow card) 68'	Stadium: Stadio Luigi Ferraris; Attendance: 20,897; Referee: Andrea Gervasoni

15 December 2012 17	Udinese	1–1	Palermo	Udine
18:00 CET (UTC+01:00)	Heurtaux (yellow card) 35' (yellow-red card) 61'; Basta (yellow card) 41'; Allan (yellow card) 76'; Di Natale (yellow card) 83', (goal) 89'	Report	Iličić 33', (yellow card) 39'; Barreto (yellow card) 45'	Stadium: Stadio Friuli; Attendance: 6,300; Referee: Sebastiano Peruzzo

22 December 2012 18	Atalanta	1–1	Udinese	Bergamo
15:00 CET (UTC+01:00)	Denis 40' (pen.); Carmona (yellow card) 47'; Moralez (yellow card) 64'	Report	Danilo (yellow card) 7'; Muriel (yellow card) 29', (goal) 34'; Pinzi (yellow card) 31'; Domizzi (yellow card) 39'	Stadium: Stadio Atleti Azzurri d'Italia; Attendance: 16,110; Referee: Marco Guida

6 January 2013 19	Udinese	3–0	Internazionale	Udine
15:00 CET (UTC+01:00)	Danilo (yellow card) 32'; Allan (yellow card) 48'; Di Natale 63', 79'; Muriel 75'; Maicosuel (yellow card) 90+1'	Report	Pereira (yellow card) 9'; Palacio (yellow card) 25'; Juan Jesus (yellow card) 39' (yellow-red card) 65'	Stadium: Stadio Friuli; Attendance: 21,000; Referee: Antonio Danilo Giannoccaro

13 January 2013 20	Udinese	3–1	Fiorentina	Udine
15:00 CET (UTC+01:00)	Pinzi (yellow card) 45'; Di Natale 45+2' (pen.), 66', (yellow card) 45+2'; Lazzari (yellow card) 59'; Muriel 67'	Report	Brkić 20' (o.g.); Aquilani (yellow card) 45+1'; Rodríguez (yellow card) 64'; Valero (yellow card) 90+3'	Stadium: Stadio Friuli; Attendance: 10,150; Referee: Andrea Romeo

19 January 2013 21	Juventus	4–0	Udinese	Turin
20:45 CET (UTC+01:00)	Vidal (yellow card) 17'; Pogba 41', 66'; Vučinić 72'; Matri 80'	Report	Pinzi (yellow card) 40'; Muriel (yellow card) 60'	Stadium: Juventus Stadium; Attendance: 36,109; Referee: Luca Banti

27 January 2013 22	Udinese	1–0	Siena	Udine
15:00 CET (UTC+01:00)	Muriel 36'; Basta (yellow card) 41'; Pinzi (yellow card) 55'; Allan (yellow card) 56'; Lazzari (yellow card) 77'; Pasquale (yellow card) 83'	Report	Rubin (yellow card) 1'; Neto (yellow card) 10'	Stadium: Stadio Friuli; Attendance: 11,011; Referee: Sebastiano Peruzzo

3 February 2013 23	Milan	2–1	Udinese	Milan
20:45 CET (UTC+01:00)	Montolivo (yellow card) 16'; Balotelli 25', 90+4' (pen.)	Report	Pinzi (yellow card) 13', (goal) 55'; Domizzi (yellow card) 38'; Lazzari (yellow card) 64'; Silva (yellow card) 84'	Stadium: San Siro; Attendance: 35,152; Referee: Davide Massa

10 February 2013 24	Udinese	1–0	Torino	Udine
15:00 CET (UTC+01:00)	Pereyra 7'	Report	Rodríguez (yellow card) 74'; D'Ambrosio (yellow card) 86'; Santana (yellow card) 90+2'	Stadium: Stadio Friuli; Attendance: 17,770; Referee: Luca Banti

17 February 2013 25	Genoa	1–0	Udinese	Genoa
15:00 CET (UTC+01:00)	Bovo (yellow card) 27'; Kucka 33'; Tőzsér (yellow card) 55'	Report	Benatia (yellow card) 54'; Angella (yellow card) 87'	Stadium: Stadio Luigi Ferraris; Attendance: 18,355; Referee: Gianpaolo Calvarese

25 February 2013 26	Udinese	0–0	Napoli	Udine
15:00 CET (UTC+01:00)	Pereyra (yellow card) 18'	Report	Inler (yellow card) 19'; Armero (yellow card) 66'; Behrami (yellow card) 67'; Cannavaro (yellow card) 82'	Stadium: Stadio Friuli; Attendance: 16,000; Referee: Antonio Damato

3 March 2013 27	Pescara	0–1	Udinese	Pescara
15:00 CET (UTC+01:00)	Bjarnason (yellow card) 54'; Sculli (yellow card) 90+2'	Report	Di Natale 8'; Muriel (yellow card) 61'; Brkić (yellow card) 90+2'	Stadium: Stadio Adriatico; Attendance: 8,714; Referee: Carmine Russo

9 March 2013 28	Udinese	1–1	Roma	Udine
15:00 CET (UTC+01:00)	Maicosuel (yellow card) 43'; Domizzi (yellow card) 50'; Muriel 62'; Heurtaux (red card) 73'	Report	Lamela 20'; Totti (yellow card) 45'; Florenzi (yellow card) 64'; Torosidis (yellow card) 76'	Stadium: Stadio Friuli; Attendance: 10,780; Referee: Marco Guida

16 March 2013 29	Catania	3–1	Udinese	Catania
15:00 CET (UTC+01:00)	Gómez 49', 67'; Bellusci (yellow card) 56'; Potenza (red card) 57'; Álvarez (yellow card) 69'; Lodi 72'	Report	Benatia (yellow card) 46'; Muriel 81'	Stadium: Stadio Angelo Massimino; Attendance: 11,993; Referee: Andrea De Marco

30 March 2013 30	Udinese	0–0	Bologna	Udine
15:00 CET (UTC+01:00)	Domizzi (yellow card) 88'	Report	Pazienza (yellow card) 25'; Christodoulopoulos (yellow card) 28'; Kone (yellow card) 41'; Gilardino (yellow card) 42'; Antonsson (yellow card) 73'; Motta (yellow card) 85'	Stadium: Stadio Friuli; Attendance: 9,600; Referee: Piero Giacomelli

7 April 2013 31	Udinese	3–1	Chievo	Udine
15:00 CEST (UTC+02:00)	Di Natale 20', 25', (yellow card) 22'; Danilo (yellow card) 62'; Benatia (yellow card) 63', (goal) 85'	Report	Jokić (yellow card) 31'; Papp 35', (yellow card) 45'; Rigoni (yellow card) 71'; Frey (yellow card) 75'; Cesar (yellow card) 79'; Acerbi (yellow card) 83'	Stadium: Stadio Friuli; Attendance: 11,500; Referee: Antonio Damato

14 April 2013 32	Parma	0–3	Udinese	Parma
15:00 CEST (UTC+02:00)	Paletta (yellow card) 28'	Report	Muriel 12', 43', (yellow card) 37'; Pereyra 62'	Stadium: Stadio Ennio Tardini; Attendance: 13,065; Referee: Filippo Merchiori

21 April 2013 33	Udinese	1–0	Lazio	Udine
15:00 CEST (UTC+02:00)	Di Natale 19'; Lazzari (yellow card) 54'; Domizzi (yellow card) 68'	Report	Ledesma (yellow card) 55'; Ederson (yellow card) 70'; Gonzalez (yellow card) 82'	Stadium: Stadio Friuli; Attendance: 13,250; Referee: Marco Guida

27 April 2013 34	Cagliari	0–1	Udinese	Quartu Sant'Elena
18:00 CEST (UTC+02:00)	Ariaudo (yellow card) 32'; Nainggolan (yellow card) 59'; Thiago Ribeiro (yellow card) 67'; Conti (yellow card) 75'; Ibarbo (yellow card) 82'; Pinilla (red card) 90+4'	Report	Zieliński (yellow card) 27'; Domizzi (yellow card) 50'; Pereyra 56'; Muriel (yellow card) 88'	Stadium: Stadio Is Arenas; Attendance: 10,000; Referee: Gianluca Rocchi

5 May 2013 35	Udinese	3–1	Sampdoria	Udine
12:30 CEST (UTC+02:00)	Pinzi (yellow card) 23'; Di Natale 29', 52', (yellow card) 59'; Danilo (yellow card) 42'; Domizzi (yellow card) 74'; Benatia (yellow card) 86'; Muriel 87'	Report	Poli (yellow card) 26'; Éder 34'; Mustafi (yellow card) 84'	Stadium: Stadio Friuli; Attendance: 13,600; Referee: Paolo Tagliavento

8 May 2013 36	Palermo	2–3	Udinese	Palermo
20:45 CEST (UTC+02:00)	Barreto (yellow card) 30'; Miccoli 34' (pen.); Dossena (yellow card) 51'; Aronica (yellow card) 53'; Faurlín (yellow card) 61'; Morganella (yellow card) 75'; Hernández 81'	Report	Muriel 10'; Badu (yellow card) 46'; Angella 64'; Benatia 84'	Stadium: Stadio Renzo Barbera; Attendance: 25,412; Referee: Antonio Danilo Giannoccaro

12 May 2013 37	Udinese	2–1	Atalanta	Udine
15:00 CEST (UTC+02:00)	Di Natale 43', 52'	Report	De Luca 10'; Radovanović (yellow card) 49'	Stadium: Stadio Friuli; Attendance: 18,800; Referee: Nicola Rizzoli

19 May 2013 38	Internazionale	2–5	Udinese	Milan
20:45 CEST (UTC+02:00)	Juan Jesus 12', (yellow card) 59'; Pereira (yellow card) 28'; Rocchi 63'	Report	Pinzi 1', (yellow card) 79'; Domizzi 10'; Di Natale 41'; Gabriel Silva 52'; Muriel 66'	Stadium: San Siro; Attendance: 41,533; Referee: Paolo Mazzoleni

=== Coppa Italia ===
19 December 2012 Round of 16	Udinese	0–1	Fiorentina	Udine
17:30 CET (UTC+01:00)	Lazzari (yellow card) 45+1'; Pinzi (yellow card) 50'; Pereyra (yellow card) 85'		Aquilani (yellow card) 21'; Valero 36'; Cuadrado (yellow card) 78'; Jovetić (yellow card) 87'; Seferovic (yellow card) 90+1'	Stadium: Stadio Friuli; Attendance: 8,000; Referee: Gianpaolo Calvarese

=== UEFA Champions League ===
==== Play-off round ====
22 August 2012 First leg	Braga (Portugal)	1–1	(Italy) Udinese	Braga, Portugal
20:45 CEST (UTC+02:00)	Lima (yellow card) 50'; Ismaily 68'	Report	Pinzi (yellow card) 13'; Di Natale (yellow card) 21'; Basta 23'; Benatia (yellow card) 35'; Domizzi (yellow card) 75'; Danilo (yellow card) 80'	Stadium: Estádio Municipal de Braga; Attendance: 13,520; Referee: Wolfgang Stark (Germany)

28 August 2012 Second leg	Udinese (Italy)	1–1 (a.e.t.) (2–2 agg.) (4–5 p)	(Portugal) Braga	Udine, Italy
20:45 CEST (UTC+02:00)	Armero 25'; Pinzi (yellow card) 61'; Di Natale (yellow card) 75'	Report	Rúben Micael 72'; Mossoró (yellow card) 103'	Stadium: Stadio Friuli; Attendance: 19,560; Referee: Björn Kuipers (Netherlands)
	Penalties
	Domizzi (penalty scored); Pinzi (penalty scored); Maicosuel (penalty missed); Armero (penalty scored); Di Natale (penalty scored)		(penalty scored) Lima; (penalty scored) Custódio; (penalty scored) Éder; (penalty scored) Paulo César; (penalty scored) Micael

=== UEFA Europa League ===
==== Group stage ====
Pos	Team	Pld	W	D	L	GF	GA	GD	Pts	Qualification
1	(England) Liverpool	6	3	1	2	11	9	+2	10 (Note: Head-to-head points: Liverpool 7, Anzhi Makhachkala 6, Young Boys 4.)	Advance to knockout phase
2	(Russia) Anzhi Makhachkala	6	3	1	2	7	5	+2	10	Advance to knockout phase
3	(Switzerland) Young Boys	6	3	1	2	14	13	+1	10	
4	(Italy) Udinese	6	1	1	4	7	12	−5	4	

Source: Soccerway
Notes:

20 September 2012 1	Udinese (Italy)	1–1	(Russia) Anzhi Makhachkala	Udine, Italy
19:00 CEST (UTC+02:00)	Pereyra (yellow card) 18'; Danilo (yellow card) 80'; Benatia (yellow card) 90'; Di Natale 90+2'	Report	Padelli 45' (o.g.); Zhirkov (yellow card) 83'; Boussoufa (yellow card) 90'	Stadium: Stadio Friuli; Attendance: 7,220; Referee: Hüseyin Göçek (Turkey)

4 October 2012 2	Liverpool (England)	2–3	(Italy) Udinese	Liverpool, England
21:05 CEST (UTC+02:00)	Shelvey 23'; Suárez 75'	Report	Di Natale 46'; Benatia (yellow card) 67'; Pinzi (yellow card) 68'; Coates 70' (o.g.); Pasquale 72'; Faraoni (yellow card) 90+1'	Stadium: Anfield; Attendance: 40,092; Referee: Stefan Johannesson (Sweden)

25 October 2012 3	Young Boys (Switzerland)	3–1	(Italy) Udinese	Bern, Switzerland
21:05 CEST (UTC+02:00)	Bobadilla 4', 71', 81' (pen.); Raimondi (yellow card) 29'; Costanzo (yellow card) 65'; Veškovac (yellow card) 90'	Report	Willians (yellow card) 49'; Armero (yellow card) 66'; Coda 74'; Domizzi (yellow card) 81'	Stadium: Stade de Suisse; Attendance: 20,143; Referee: Clément Turpin (France)

8 November 2012 4	Udinese (Italy)	2–3	(Switzerland) Young Boys	Udine, Italy
20:00 CET (UTC+01:00)	Di Natale 47'; Coda (yellow card) 48'; Fabbrini (yellow card) 58', (goal) 83'; Faraoni (yellow card) 85'	Report	Bobadilla 27'; Farnerud (yellow card) 62', (goal) 65'; Nuzzolo 73'; Raimondi (yellow card) 77'; Nef (yellow card) 82'	Stadium: Stadio Friuli; Attendance: 6,190; Referee: Kristo Tohver (Estonia)

22 November 2012 5	Anzhi Makhachkala (Russia)	2–0	(Italy) Udinese	Makhachkala, Russia
19:00 CET (UTC+01:00)	Samba 72'; Eto'o 75'; Zhirkov (yellow card) 79'; Boussoufa (yellow card) 88'	Report	Willians (yellow card) 45' (yellow-red card) 80'; Di Natale (yellow card) 66'; Domizzi (yellow card) 80'	Stadium: Dynamo Stadium; Attendance: 8,556; Referee: Serge Gumienny (Belgium)

6 December 2012 6	Udinese (Italy)	0–1	(England) Liverpool	Udine, Italy
20:00 CET (UTC+01:00)	Fabbrini (yellow card) 17'; Pasquale (yellow card) 67' (yellow-red card) 79'; Badu (yellow card) 80'	Report	Henderson 23'; Suso (yellow card) 36'; Allen (yellow card) 71'; Carragher (yellow card) 82'	Stadium: Stadio Friuli; Attendance: 7,650; Referee: Duarte Gomes (Portugal)

== Statistics ==
=== Appearances and goals ===
No.	Pos	Nat	Player	Total		Serie A		Coppa Italia		Champions League		Europa League	
No.	Pos	Nat	Player	Apps	Goals	Apps	Goals	Apps	Goals	Apps	Goals	Apps	Goals
Goalkeepers
1	GK	(Serbia) SRB	Željko Brkić	37	0	31	0	0	0	2	0	4	0
22	GK	(Greece) GRE	Orestis Karnezis	0	0	0	0	0	0	0	0	0	0
25	GK	(Italy) ITA	Daniele Padelli	12	0	7+2	0	1	0	0	0	2	0
93	GK	(Poland) POL	Wojciech Pawłowski	0	0	0	0	0	0	0	0	0	0
Defenders
3	DF	(Brazil) BRA	Allan	37	0	33+3	0	1	0	0	0	0	0
4	DF	(Italy) ITA	Gabriele Angella	15	4	11+3	4	1	0	0	0	0	0
5	DF	(Brazil) BRA	Danilo	41	2	32	2	1	0	2	0	6	0
6	DF	(Italy) ITA	Marco Faraoni	17	0	6+5	0	0	0	0	0	5+1	0
8	DF	(Serbia) SRB	Dušan Basta	34	2	27+1	1	1	0	2	1	1+2	0
11	DF	(Italy) ITA	Maurizio Domizzi	37	2	29+1	2	0	0	2	0	4+1	0
17	DF	(Morocco) MAR	Medhi Benatia	25	2	19	2	0	0	2	0	3+1	0
26	DF	(Italy) ITA	Giovanni Pasquale	23	2	17+1	1	0	0	0+2	0	2+1	1
34	DF	(Brazil) BRA	Gabriel Silva	19	1	13+5	1	1	0	0	0	0	0
75	DF	(France) FRA	Thomas Heurtaux	20	0	13+4	0	1	0	0	0	2	0
Midfielders
7	MF	(Ghana) GHA	Emmanuel Agyemang-Badu	32	0	14+11	0	0	0	0+2	0	5	0
15	MF	(Uruguay) URU	Diego Rodríguez	1	0	0+1	0	0	0	0	0	0	0
21	MF	(Italy) ITA	Andrea Lazzari	29	1	21+3	1	1	0	0	0	3+1	0
23	MF	(Chile) CHI	Matías Campos	4	0	0+4	0	0	0	0	0	0	0
37	MF	(Argentina) ARG	Roberto Pereyra	46	5	31+6	5	0+1	0	2	0	5+1	0
52	MF	(Germany) GER	Alexander Merkel	5	0	1+4	0	0	0	0	0	0	0
66	MF	(Italy) ITA	Giampiero Pinzi	25	3	17+2	3	1	0	2	0	2+1	0
77	MF	(Brazil) BRA	Maicosuel	23	2	15+5	2	0+1	0	0+2	0	0	0
Forwards
10	FW	(Italy) ITA	Antonio Di Natale	42	26	31+2	23	1	0	2	0	3+3	3
13	FW	(Sweden) SWE	Mathias Ranégie	26	1	3+17	1	0	0	0	0	4+2	0
24	FW	(Colombia) COL	Luis Muriel	23	11	15+7	11	0+1	0	0	0	0	0
94	FW	(Poland) POL	Piotr Zieliński	9	0	4+5	0	0	0	0	0	0	0
Players transferred out during the season
9	FW	(Brazil) BRA	Barreto	5	0	2+2	0	0	0	0	0	0+1	0
16	DF	(Italy) ITA	Andrea Coda	13	1	10+1	0	0	0	0	0	2	1
27	DF	(Colombia) COL	Pablo Armero	18	1	8+2	0	0	0	2	1	6	0
31	FW	(Italy) ITA	Diego Fabbrini	14	1	4+3	0	1	0	2	0	3+1	1
88	MF	(Brazil) BRA	Willians	12	0	3+2	0	0	0	2	0	4+1	0

Last updated: 28 October 2012
Source: Competitions

=== Goalscorers ===
Rank	No.	Pos	Nat	Name	Serie A	Coppa Italia	UEFA CL	UEFA EL	Total
1	10	FW	(Italy)	Antonio Di Natale	23	0	0	3	26
2	24	FW	(Colombia)	Luis Muriel	11	0	0	0	11
3	37	MF	(Argentina)	Roberto Pereyra	5	0	0	0	5
4	4	DF	(Italy)	Gabriele Angella	4	0	0	0	4
5	66	MF	(Italy)	Giampiero Pinzi	3	0	0	0	3
6	5	DF	(Brazil)	Danilo	2	0	0	0	2
6	8	DF	(Serbia)	Dušan Basta	1	0	1	0	2
6	11	DF	(Italy)	Maurizio Domizzi	2	0	0	0	2
6	17	DF	(Morocco)	Medhi Benatia	2	0	0	0	2
6	26	DF	(Italy)	Giovanni Pasquale	1	0	0	1	2
6	77	MF	(Brazil)	Maicosuel	2	0	0	0	2
12	13	FW	(Sweden)	Mathias Ranégie	1	0	0	0	1
12	16	DF	(Italy)	Andrea Coda	0	0	0	1	1
12	21	MF	(Italy)	Andrea Lazzari	1	0	0	0	1
12	27	DF	(Colombia)	Pablo Armero	0	0	1	0	1
12	31	FW	(Italy)	Diego Fabbrini	0	0	0	1	1
12	34	DF	(Brazil)	Gabriel Silva	1	0	0	0	1
—	Own goal				0	0	0	1	1
Total					59	0	2	7	68

Last updated: 19 May 2013
