= 2014–15 Udinese Calcio season =

Udinese
2014–15 season
- President: Franco Soldati
- Manager: Andrea Stramaccioni
- Stadium: Stadio Friuli
- Serie A: 16th
- Coppa Italia: Round of 16
- Top goalscorer: League: Antonio Di Natale (14); All: Antonio Di Natale (18)
- Highest home attendance: 11,241 vs Juventus (1 February 2015, Serie A)
- Lowest home attendance: 2,400 vs Cesena (3 December 2014, Coppa Italia)
- Average home league attendance: 8,912
Home colours	Away colours	Third colours

The 2014–15 season was Udinese Calcio's 35th in Serie A, and their 20th consecutive season in the top-flight. Having missed out on European football for the first time since the 2010–11 season, the club competed domestically in Serie A and in the Coppa Italia, finishing 16th and being eliminated in the round of 16, respectively.

== Players ==
=== Squad information ===
Note: Flags indicate national team as defined under FIFA eligibility rules; some limited exceptions apply. Players may hold more than one non-FIFA nationality.

No.	Pos.	Nation	Player
1	GK	SRB	Željko Brkić
2	DF	MLI	Molla Wagué (on loan from Granada)
3	DF	GHA	Masahudu Alhassan
4	DF	BRA	Naldo
5	DF	BRA	Danilo
6	MF	BRA	Allan
7	MF	GHA	Emmanuel Agyemang-Badu
8	MF	POR	Bruno Fernandes
9	FW	URU	Nicolás López
10	FW	ITA	Antonio Di Natale (captain)
11	DF	ITA	Maurizio Domizzi
13	MF	COL	Alexis Zapata
14	DF	ITA	Nicola Belmonte
15	DF	POL	Paweł Bochniewicz
16	DF	BRA	Douglas Santos
17	MF	ESP	Albert Riera
18	DF	CRO	Igor Bubnjić
19	MF	BRA	Guilherme
20	MF	ESP	Jaime Romero
21	DF	BRA	Edenílson
22	GK	ITA	Simone Scuffet
23	MF	BRA	Jadson

No.	Pos.	Nation	Player
24	FW	COL	Luis Muriel
25	DF	ITA	Andrea Coda
26	DF	ITA	Giovanni Pasquale
27	DF	SUI	Silvan Widmer
29	DF	FRA	Alexandre Coeff
30	GK	CRO	Ivan Kelava
32	DF	ITA	Davide Faraoni
33	GK	GRE	Orestis Karnezis
34	DF	BRA	Gabriel Silva
66	MF	ITA	Giampiero Pinzi
75	DF	FRA	Thomas Heurtaux
77	FW	FRA	Cyril Théréau
82	FW	ESP	Alexandre Geijo
88	MF	CRO	Frano Mlinar
89	DF	PAR	Iván Piris (on loan from Deportivo Maldonado)
90	DF	ITA	Daniele Mori
94	MF	POL	Piotr Zieliński
96	MF	MAR	Nabil Jaadi
97	GK	ITA	Alex Meret
99	GK	ITA	Francesco Benussi

=== Serie A ===
==== League table ====
Pos	Team	Pld	W	D	L	GF	GA	GD	Pts	Qualification or relegation
14	Chievo	38	10	13	15	28	41	−13	43	
15	Empoli	38	8	18	12	46	52	−6	42	
16	Udinese	38	10	11	17	43	56	−13	41	
17	Atalanta	38	7	16	15	38	57	−19	37	
18	Cagliari (R)	38	8	10	20	48	68	−20	34	Relegation to Serie B

Source: 2014–15 Serie A, 2014-15 Serie A classification.
Rules for classification: 1) points; 2) head-to-head points; 3) head-to-head goal difference; 4) goal difference; 5) number of goals scored; 6) draw. (Head-to-head record is applied for clubs with the same number of points only once all matches between said clubs have been played.).
(R) Relegated

==== Results summary ====
Overall								Home						Away					
Pld	W	D	L	GF	GA	GD	Pts	W	D	L	GF	GA	GD	W	D	L	GF	GA	GD
38	10	11	17	43	56	−13	41	6	5	8	26	29	−3	4	6	9	17	27	−10

Last updated: 31 May 2015.
Source: Competitive matches

==== Results by round ====
Round	1	2	3	4	5	6	7	8	9	10	11	12	13	14	15	16	17	18	19	20	21	22	23	24	25	26	27	28	29	30	31	32	33	34	35	36	37	38
Ground	H	A	H	A	H	H	A	H	A	H	A	H	A	A	H	A	H	A	H	A	H	A	H	A	A	H	A	H	A	H	A	H	H	A	H	A	H	A
Result	W	L	W	W	W	D	L	W	L	L	D	D	L	W	L	D	L	D	D	W	D	L	L	L	L	W	D	D	D	L	D	W	L	W	L	L	L	L
Position	3	10	5	3	3	4	5	3	6	8	8	8	9	8	9	9	12	12	12	9	12	13	13	13	13	12	12	12	13	14	15	13	14	12	13	15	16	16

Updated to match(es) played on 31 May 2015. Source: Competitive matches
A = Away; H = Home; W = Win; D = Draw; L = Loss

==== Matches ====
31 August 2014 1	Udinese	2–0	Empoli	Udine
20:45 CEST (UTC+02:00)	Pasquale (yellow card) 39'; Di Natale 57', 62'; Badu (yellow card) 64'	Report	Croce (yellow card) 55'; Verdi (yellow card) 74'	Stadium: Stadio Friuli; Attendance: 7,889; Referee: Marco Di Bello

13 September 2014 2	Juventus	2–0	Udinese	Turin
20:45 CEST (UTC+02:00)	Tevez 8'; Marchisio 75'	Report	Pasquale (yellow card) 40'	Stadium: Juventus Stadium; Attendance: 38,217; Referee: Antonio Damato

21 September 2014 3	Udinese	1–0	Napoli	Udine
18:00 CEST (UTC+02:00)	Fernandes (yellow card) 49'; Danilo 70'	Report	López (yellow card) 54'; Albiol (yellow card) 84'; Callejón (yellow card) 90'	Stadium: Stadio Friuli; Attendance: 8,833; Referee: Paolo Tagliavento

25 September 2014 4	Lazio	0–1	Udinese	Rome
20:45 CEST (UTC+02:00)	Novaretti (yellow card) 15'; Candreva (yellow card) 45+4'; Lulić (yellow card) 88'	Report	Théréau 26'; Kone (yellow card) 45+1'	Stadium: Stadio Olimpico; Attendance: 26,919; Referee: Gianluca Rocchi

29 September 2014 5	Udinese	4–2	Parma	Udine
19:00 CEST (UTC+02:00)	Di Natale 28', 45'; Kone (yellow card) 38'; Widmer (yellow card) 45+3'; Heurtaux 58'; Théréau 83'	Report	Mauri 22'; Acquah (yellow card) 23' (yellow-red card) 77'; Cassano 45+4' (pen.)	Stadium: Stadio Friuli; Attendance: 8,652; Referee: Gianpaolo Calvarese

5 October 2014 6	Udinese	1–1	Cesena	Udine
15:00 CEST (UTC+02:00)	Fernandes 62'; Muriel (yellow card) 81'; Widmer (yellow card) 90+1'; Karnezis (yellow card) 90+2'	Report	Lucchini (yellow card) 27'; Coppola (yellow card) 70'; Capelli (yellow card) 78'; Cascione 90+2' (pen.)	Stadium: Stadio Friuli; Attendance: 8,887; Referee: Maurizio Mariani

19 October 2014 7	Torino	1–0	Udinese	Turin
15:00 CEST (UTC+02:00)	Molinaro (yellow card) 13'; Benassi (yellow card) 43'; Quagliarella 62'; Pérez (yellow card) 88'	Report	Heurtaux (yellow card) 36'; Allan (yellow card) 66'	Stadium: Stadio Olimpico di Torino; Attendance: 13,434; Referee: Carmine Russo

26 October 2014 8	Udinese	2–0	Atalanta	Udine
15:00 CET (UTC+01:00)	Di Natale 6'; Théréau 36'; Kone (yellow card) 43'; Guilherme (yellow card) 76'	Report	Cigarini (yellow card) 88'	Stadium: Stadio Friuli; Attendance: 8,300; Referee: Dino Tommasi

29 October 2014 9	Fiorentina	3–0	Udinese	Florence
20:45 CET (UTC+01:00)	Alonso (yellow card) 17'; Babacar 44', 70'; Savić (yellow card) 60'; Valero 80'	Report	Fernandes (yellow card) 52'; Allan (yellow card) 55'; Piris (yellow card) 67'	Stadium: Stadio Artemio Franchi; Attendance: 27,016; Referee: Davide Massa

2 November 2014 10	Udinese	2–4	Genoa	Udine
15:00 CET (UTC+01:00)	Di Natale 1'; Fernandes (yellow card) 39'; Widmer 41'; Guilherme (yellow card) 90'	Report	Marchese 21'; Falque 24', (yellow card) 36'; De Maio (yellow card) 30'; Roncaglia (yellow card) 34'; Matri 54'; Kucka 87'	Stadium: Stadio Friuli; Attendance: 8,701; Referee: Massimiliano Irrati

9 November 2014 11	Palermo	1–1	Udinese	Palermo
15:00 CET (UTC+01:00)	Sorrentino (yellow card) 42'; Dybala 42' (pen.)	Report	Théréau 5'; Badu (yellow card) 16'; Allan (yellow card) 53'; Piris (yellow card) 82'; Pinzi (yellow card) 87'; Kone (yellow card) 90+3'	Stadium: Stadio Renzo Barbera; Attendance: 15,658; Referee: Daniele Doveri

23 November 2014 12	Udinese	1–1	Chievo	Udine
15:00 CET (UTC+01:00)	Di Natale (yellow card) 31', (goal) 45+1'; Théréau (yellow card) 44'; Pinzi (yellow card) 64'	Report	Dainelli (yellow card) 26'; Radovanović 74'; Frey (yellow card) 90+1'	Stadium: Stadio Friuli; Attendance: 8,544; Referee: Angelo Cervellera

30 November 2014 13	Milan	2–0	Udinese	Milan
15:00 CET (UTC+01:00)	Essien (yellow card) 54' (yellow-red card) 71'; Ménez 65' (pen.), 75'	Report	Badu (yellow card) 60'; Domizzi (red card) 62'; Danilo (yellow card) 64'	Stadium: San Siro; Attendance: 36,170; Referee: Paolo Valeri

7 December 2014 14	Internazionale	1–2	Udinese	Milan
20:45 CET (UTC+01:00)	Icardi 44'; Dodô (yellow card) 49'; Bonazzoli (yellow card) 90+1'	Report	Fernandes 60'; Théréau 71'; Pinzi (yellow card) 86'	Stadium: San Siro; Attendance: 34,912; Referee: Andrea Gervasoni

14 December 2014 15	Udinese	1–2	Hellas Verona	Udine
15:00 CET (UTC+01:00)	Di Natale 31', (yellow card) 90+1'; Allan (yellow card) 90'	Report	Agostini (yellow card) 6'; Toni 45+1'; Christodoulopoulos 46'; Tachtsidis (yellow card) 87'; González (yellow card) 89'; Valoti (yellow card) 90'; Benussi (yellow card) 90+4'	Stadium: Stadio Friuli; Attendance: 8,247; Referee: Sebastiano Peruzzo

21 December 2014 16	Sampdoria	2–2	Udinese	Genoa
15:00 CET (UTC+01:00)	Obiang 15'; Soriano (yellow card) 18'; Gabbiadini (yellow card) 37', (goal) 60'; Éder (yellow card) 86'	Report	Widmer (yellow card) 22'; Geijo 31'; Danilo 34'; Heurtaux (yellow card) 43' (yellow-red card) 88'; Pasquale (yellow card) 65'; Pinzi (yellow card) 90+4'; Kone (yellow card) 90+5'	Stadium: Stadio Luigi Ferraris; Attendance: 21,413; Referee: Massimiliano Irrati

6 January 2015 17	Udinese	0–1	Roma	Udine
12:30 CET (UTC+01:00)	Di Natale (yellow card) 21'	Report	Astori 17', (yellow card) 72'; Maicon (yellow card) 45+1'; Pjanić (yellow card) 52'; Torosidis (yellow card) 89'; Emanuelson (yellow card) 90'	Stadium: Stadio Friuli; Attendance: 10,870; Referee: Marco Guida

10 January 2015 18	Sassuolo	1–1	Udinese	Reggio Emilia
18:00 CET (UTC+01:00)	Zaza 15'; Berardi (yellow card) 46'; Vrsaljko (yellow card) 49'; Cannavaro (yellow card) 57'	Report	Théréau 26', (yellow card) 58'; Widmer (yellow card) 47'	Stadium: Mapei Stadium – Città del Tricolore; Attendance: 11,221; Referee: Davide Massa

18 January 2015 19	Udinese	2–2	Cagliari	Udine
15:00 CET (UTC+01:00)	Kone (yellow card) 20'; Allan 55'; Théréau 56'	Report	Donsah (yellow card) 32'; João Pedro 39'; Longo (yellow card) 44'; Rossettini (yellow card) 57'; Dessena (yellow card) 73'; Avelar 90+1' (pen.)	Stadium: Stadio Friuli; Attendance: 9,366; Referee: Marco Di Bello

26 January 2015 20	Empoli	1–2	Udinese	Empoli
19:00 CET (UTC+01:00)	Saponara 37' (pen.), (yellow card) 38'; Barba (yellow card) 90+4'	Report	Di Natale 19'; Danilo (yellow card) 36'; Widmer 60'; Kone (yellow card) 61' (yellow-red card) 74'; Piris (yellow card) 69'	Stadium: Stadio Carlo Castellani; Attendance: 7,381; Referee: Davide Ghersini

1 February 2015 21	Udinese	0–0	Juventus	Udine
15:00 CET (UTC+01:00)	Di Natale (yellow card) 87'; Théréau (yellow card) 90+3'	Report	Lichtsteiner (yellow card) 83'	Stadium: Stadio Friuli; Attendance: 11,241; Referee: Andrea Gervasoni

8 February 2015 22	Napoli	3–1	Udinese	Naples
15:00 CET (UTC+01:00)	Mertens 8', (yellow card) 38'; Gabbiadini 21'; Théréau 59' (o.g.); Higuaín (yellow card) 81'	Report	Hallberg (yellow card) 1'; Allan (yellow card) 11'; Théréau 27'; Pasquale (yellow card) 68'; Heurtaux (yellow card) 85'	Stadium: Stadio San Paolo; Attendance: 28,773; Referee: Paolo Mazzoleni

15 February 2015 23	Udinese	0–1	Lazio	Udine
15:00 CET (UTC+01:00)	Wagué (yellow card) 22'; Allan (yellow card) 54'	Report	Candreva 23' (pen.), (yellow card) 63'; Onazi (yellow card) 29'; Cataldi (yellow card) 78'; Anderson (yellow card) 83'; Radu (yellow card) 88'	Stadium: Stadio Friuli; Attendance: 8,282; Referee: Davide Massa

1 March 2015 25	Cesena	1–0	Udinese	Cesena
15:00 CET (UTC+01:00)	Mudingayi (yellow card) 18'; Capelli (yellow card) 26'; Magnússon (yellow card) 29'; Rodríguez 76'; Perico (yellow card) 90+1'	Report	Heurtaux (yellow card) 24'; Danilo (yellow card) 89'; Perica (yellow card) 90+4'	Stadium: Stadio Dino Manuzzi; Attendance: 14,794; Referee: Daniele Doveri

8 March 2015 26	Udinese	3–2	Torino	Udine
15:00 CET (UTC+01:00)	Di Natale 17'; Molinaro 25' (o.g.); Pasquale (yellow card) 29'; Wagué 49'; Kone (yellow card) 53'; Pinzi (yellow card) 65'	Report	Quagliarella 15'; Gazzi (yellow card) 31'; Benassi (yellow card) 64', (goal) 69'	Stadium: Stadio Friuli; Attendance: 8,519; Referee: Nicola Rizzoli

15 March 2015 27	Atalanta	0–0	Udinese	Bergamo
15:00 CET (UTC+01:00)	Biava (yellow card) 32'; Cigarini (yellow card) 43'; Carmona (red card) 76'	Report	Pasquale (yellow card) 50'; Pinzi (yellow card) 61'; Badu (yellow card) 89'	Stadium: Stadio Atleti Azzurri d'Italia; Attendance: 14,073; Referee: Gianluca Rocchi

22 March 2015 28	Udinese	2–2	Fiorentina	Udine
20:45 CET (UTC+01:00)	Wagué 15', (yellow card) 49'; Kone 62'; Pinzi (yellow card) 69'; Danilo (yellow card) 72'	Report	Iličić (yellow card) 48'; Gómez 50', 53', (yellow card) 62'; Kurtić (yellow card) 57'	Stadium: Stadio Friuli; Attendance: 9,000; Referee: Massimiliano Irrati

4 April 2015 29	Genoa	1–1	Udinese	Genoa
15:00 CEST (UTC+02:00)	De Maio 19'; Costa (yellow card) 62'; Rincón (yellow card) 78'	Report	Pinzi (yellow card) 18'; Piris (yellow card) 44'; Guilherme (yellow card) 49'; Théréau 68'	Stadium: Stadio Luigi Ferraris; Attendance: 18,117; Referee: Paolo Mazzoleni

8 April 2015 24	Parma	1–0	Udinese	Parma
15:00 CET (UTC+01:00)	Mauri (yellow card) 21'; Varela (yellow card) 54', (goal) 70'	Report	Wagué (yellow card) 11'	Stadium: Stadio Ennio Tardini; Attendance: 9,772; Referee: Angelo Cervellera
Note: Postponed from 22 February due to Parma's financial troubles.

12 April 2015 30	Udinese	1–3	Palermo	Udine
15:00 CEST (UTC+02:00)	Danilo (yellow card) 72'; Guilherme (yellow card) 74'; Di Natale 81'	Report	Lazaar 15'; Rigoni 21'; Chochev 66'	Stadium: Stadio Friuli; Attendance: 8,704; Referee: Dino Tommasi

19 April 2015 31	Chievo	1–1	Udinese	Verona
15:00 CEST (UTC+02:00)	Pellissier 39'; Meggiorini (yellow card) 58'; Zukanović (yellow card) 59'; Birsa (yellow card) 64'	Report	Fernandes (yellow card) 31'; Allan (yellow card) 36'; Pinzi (yellow card) 45'; Cesar 71' (o.g.); Danilo (yellow card) 82'	Stadium: Stadio Marc'Antonio Bentegodi; Attendance: 9,000; Referee: Davide Massa

25 April 2015 32	Udinese	2–1	Milan	Udine
18:00 CEST (UTC+02:00)	Domizzi (yellow card) 29'; Pinzi (yellow card) 38', (goal) 58'; Badu 74'	Report	Pazzini (yellow card) 41', (goal) 88'	Stadium: Stadio Friuli; Attendance: 9,006; Referee: Antonio Damato

28 April 2015 33	Udinese	1–2	Internazionale	Udine
20:45 CEST (UTC+02:00)	Pinzi (yellow card) 14'; Domizzi (yellow card) 26' (yellow-red card) 40'; Karnezis (yellow card) 46'; Di Natale 50'; Widmer (yellow card) 51'; Badu (yellow card) 58' (red card) 58'	Report	Guarín (yellow card) 19'; Icardi 48' (pen.); Podolski 65', (yellow card) 71'; Palacio (yellow card) 83'; Medel (yellow card) 90+3'	Stadium: Stadio Friuli; Attendance: 8,901; Referee: Gianluca Rocchi

3 May 2015 34	Hellas Verona	0–1	Udinese	Verona
15:00 CEST (UTC+02:00)	Greco (yellow card) 34'; Sala (red card) 61'; Márquez (red card) 90+1'	Report	Perica (yellow card) 30'; Allan (yellow card) 51'; Piris (yellow card) 54'; Di Natale 62'; Bubnjić (yellow card) 66'	Stadium: Stadio Marc'Antonio Bentegodi; Attendance: 17,418; Referee: Angelo Cervellera

10 May 2015 35	Udinese	1–4	Sampdoria	Udine
15:00 CEST (UTC+02:00)	Piris (yellow card) 82'; Di Natale 87' (pen.)	Report	Soriano 25', 62', (yellow card) 39'; Regini (yellow card) 56'; Acquah 80'; Viviano (yellow card) 86'; Duncan 89'; Coda (yellow card) 90+4'	Stadium: Stadio Friuli; Attendance: 8,492; Referee: Marco Di Bello

17 May 2015 36	Roma	2–1	Udinese	Rome
15:00 CEST (UTC+02:00)	Nainggolan 45', (yellow card) 80'; Torosidis 65', (yellow card) 87'; Ljajić (yellow card) 90'	Report	Perica 19'; Piris (yellow card) 24'; Heurtaux (yellow card) 49'	Stadium: Stadio Olimpico; Attendance: 35,720; Referee: Luca Banti

24 May 2015 37	Udinese	0–1	Sassuolo	Udine
15:00 CEST (UTC+02:00)	Kone (yellow card) 51'; Guilherme (yellow card) 54' (yellow-red card) 79'	Report	Berardi (yellow card) 45+1'; Magnanelli 70'	Stadium: Stadio Friuli; Attendance: 8,899; Referee: Rosario Abisso

31 May 2015 38	Cagliari	4–3	Udinese	Cagliari
18:00 CEST (UTC+02:00)	Sau 13'; João Pedro 19'; M'Poku 79'; Fernandes 85' (o.g.); Avelar (yellow card) 90'	Report	Wagué (yellow card) 16'; Danilo (yellow card) 28'; Aguirre 44', (yellow card) 54'; Fernandes (yellow card) 62', (goal) 81'; Théréau 88'	Stadium: Stadio Sant'Elia; Attendance: 5,000; Referee: Gianluca Manganiello

=== Coppa Italia ===
24 August 2014 Third round	Udinese	5–1	Ternana	Udine
21:00 CEST (UTC+02:00)	Di Natale 19', 28', 43', 75'; Pasquale (yellow card) 63'; Bubnjić (yellow card) 77'; Théréau 81' (pen.)		Ceravolo 34'; Avenatti (yellow card) 79'	Stadium: Stadio Friuli; Attendance: 5,000; Referee: Sebastiano Peruzzo

3 December 2014 Fourth round	Udinese	4–2 (a.e.t.)	Cesena	Udine
21:00 CET (UTC+01:00)	Allan 20', (yellow card) 82'; Fernandes 44', (yellow card) 88'; Danilo (yellow card) 55'; Evangelista 99'; Théréau 113'		Đurić 4', (yellow card) 94'; Succi 55'; Volta (red card) 61'; Krajnc (yellow card) 90'; Capelli (yellow card) 103'; Cazzola (yellow card) 105+1'	Stadium: Stadio Friuli; Attendance: 2,400; Referee: Dino Tommasi

22 January 2015 Round of 16	Napoli	2–2 (a.e.t.) (5–4 p)	Udinese	Naples
21:00 CET (UTC+01:00)	Jorginho 65' (pen.), (yellow card) 69'; Mesto (yellow card) 94'; Strinić (yellow card) 97'; Hamšík 99'		Gabriel Silva (yellow card) 3'; Hallberg (yellow card) 9'; Théréau (yellow card) 28', (goal) 58'; Widmer (yellow card) 44' (yellow-red card) 68'; Heurtaux (yellow card) 63'; Kone 104'	Stadium: Stadio San Paolo; Attendance: 10,847; Referee: Daniele Orsato
	Penalties
	De Guzmán (penalty scored); Jorginho (penalty scored); Mesto (penalty scored); Hamšík (penalty scored); Higuaín (penalty scored)		(penalty scored) Fernandes; (penalty scored) Guilherme; (penalty scored) Kone; (penalty scored) Danilo; (penalty missed) Allan

== Statistics ==
=== Appearances and goals ===
No.	Pos	Nat	Player	Total		Serie A		Coppa Italia	
No.	Pos	Nat	Player	Apps	Goals	Apps	Goals	Apps	Goals
Goalkeepers
22	GK	(Italy) ITA	Simone Scuffet	2	0	1+1	0	0	0
31	GK	(Greece) GRE	Orestis Karnezis	37	0	37	0	0	0
97	GK	(Italy) ITA	Alex Meret	0	0	0	0	0	0
Defenders
2	DF	(Mali) MLI	Molla Wagué	10	2	10	2	0	0
5	DF	(Brazil) BRA	Danilo	37	2	37	2	0	0
11	DF	(Italy) ITA	Maurizio Domizzi	11	0	10+1	0	0	0
18	DF	(Croatia) CRO	Igor Bubnjić	6	0	5+1	0	0	0
26	DF	(Italy) ITA	Giovanni Pasquale	21	0	14+7	0	0	0
27	DF	(Switzerland) SUI	Silvan Widmer	36	2	35+1	2	0	0
34	DF	(Brazil) BRA	Gabriel Silva	11	0	8+3	0	0	0
75	DF	(France) FRA	Thomas Heurtaux	26	1	24+2	1	0	0
89	DF	(Paraguay) PAR	Iván Piris	31	0	31	0	0	0
Midfielders
6	MF	(Brazil) BRA	Allan	35	1	33+2	1	0	0
7	MF	(Ghana) GHA	Emmanuel Agyemang-Badu	27	1	20+7	1	0	0
8	MF	(Portugal) POR	Bruno Fernandes	31	3	16+15	3	0	0
19	MF	(Brazil) BRA	Guilherme	34	0	32+2	0	0	0
21	MF	(Sweden) SWE	Melker Hallberg	4	0	2+2	0	0	0
33	MF	(Greece) GRE	Panagiotis Kone	28	1	20+8	1	0	0
49	MF	(Italy) ITA	Simone Pontisso	1	0	0+1	0	0	0
66	MF	(Italy) ITA	Giampiero Pinzi	19	1	14+5	1	0	0
95	MF	(Brazil) BRA	Lucas Evangelista	4	0	1+3	0	0	0
Forwards
9	FW	(Croatia) CRO	Stipe Perica	9	1	5+4	1	0	0
10	FW	(Italy) ITA	Antonio Di Natale	33	14	27+6	14	0	0
77	FW	(France) FRA	Cyril Théréau	37	10	25+12	10	0	0
82	FW	(Spain) ESP	Alexandre Geijo	13	1	5+8	1	0	0
94	FW	(Uruguay) URU	Rodrigo Aguirre	8	1	1+7	1	0	0
Players transferred out during the season
1	GK	(Serbia) SRB	Željko Brkić	0	0	0	0	0	0
13	MF	(Colombia) COL	Alexis Zapata	1	0	0+1	0	0	0
14	DF	(Italy) ITA	Nicola Belmonte	2	0	0+2	0	0	0
20	FW	(Colombia) COL	Luis Muriel	11	0	5+6	0	0	0

Last updated: 31 May 2015
Source: Competitions

=== Goalscorers ===
Rank	No.	Pos	Nat	Name	Serie A	Coppa Italia	Total
1	10	FW	(Italy)	Antonio Di Natale	14	4	18
2	77	FW	(France)	Cyril Théréau	10	3	13
3	8	MF	(Portugal)	Bruno Fernandes	3	1	4
4	2	DF	(Mali)	Molla Wagué	2	0	2
4	5	DF	(Brazil)	Danilo	2	0	2
4	6	MF	(Brazil)	Allan	1	1	2
4	27	DF	(Switzerland)	Silvan Widmer	2	0	2
4	33	MF	(Greece)	Panagiotis Kone	1	1	2
9	7	MF	(Ghana)	Emmanuel Agyemang-Badu	1	0	1
9	9	FW	(Croatia)	Stipe Perica	1	0	1
9	66	MF	(Italy)	Giampiero Pinzi	1	0	1
9	75	DF	(France)	Thomas Heurtaux	1	0	1
9	82	FW	(Spain)	Alexandre Geijo	1	0	1
9	94	FW	(Uruguay)	Rodrigo Aguirre	1	0	1
9	95	MF	(Brazil)	Lucas Evangelista	0	1	1
Own goal					2	0	2
Total					43	11	54

Last updated: 31 May 2015
