= Luis Muriel =

Colombian footballer (born 1991)

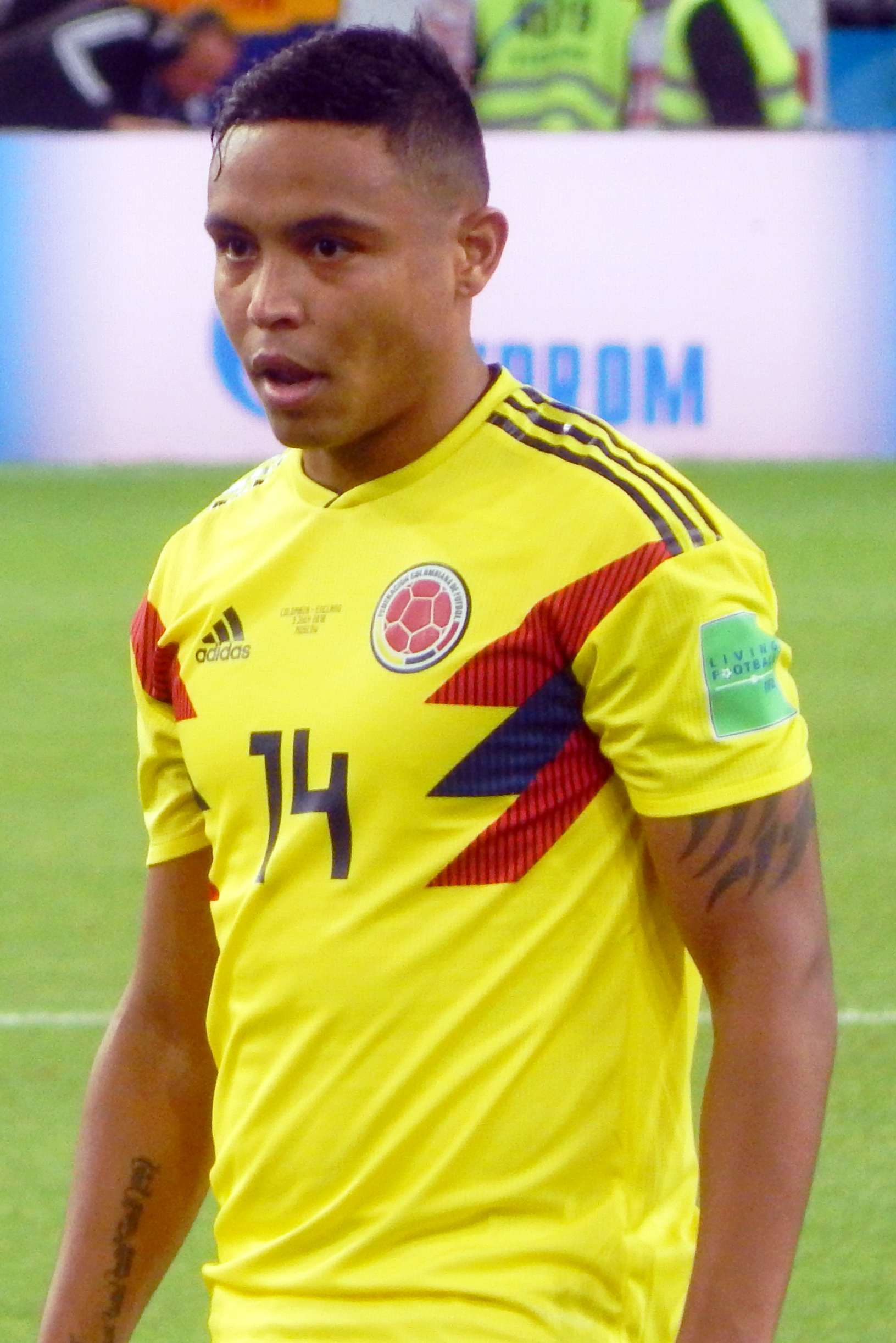
- Muriel with Colombia at the 2018 FIFA World Cup

Personal information
- Full name: Luis Fernando Muriel Fruto
- Date of birth: 16 April 1991 (age 35)
- Place of birth: Santo Tomás, Atlántico, Colombia
- Height: 1.79 m (5 ft 10 in)
- Positions: Forward; attacking midfielder

Team information
- Current team: Junior
- Number: 10

Youth career
- 2001–2008: Junior
- 2008–2009: Deportivo Cali

Senior career*
Years	Team	Apps	(Gls)
2009–2010	Deportivo Cali	11	(9)
2010–2015	Udinese	57	(15)
2010–2011	→ Granada (loan)	7	(0)
2011–2012	→ Lecce (loan)	29	(7)
2015	→ Sampdoria (loan)	16	(4)
2015–2017	Sampdoria	63	(17)
2017–2019	Sevilla	35	(8)
2019	→ Fiorentina (loan)	19	(6)
2019–2024	Atalanta	144	(54)
2024–2026	Orlando City	66	(14)
2026–	Junior	37	(16)

International career
2011	Colombia U20	5	(4)
2012–2022	Colombia	45	(8)
Medal record
Representing Colombia
Men's football
Copa América
Third place	2021 Brazil
- * Club domestic league appearances and goals as of 03:59, 10 November 2026 (UTC)

Luis Fernando Muriel Fruto (born 16 April 1991) is a Colombian professional footballer who plays as a forward or attacking midfielder for Categoría Primera A club Junior.

Having started his professional career with Colombian side Deportivo Cali, Muriel joined Udinese. His first two seasons at the club saw him loaned out to Granada and Lecce respectively before returning to the club in 2012, during which year he won the Serie A Best Young Revelation award alongside Stephan El Shaarawy. After scoring 15 league goals in 57 appearances, Muriel joined fellow Serie A side Sampdoria in January 2015. He spent two and a half seasons with the club, scoring 21 goals in 79 league appearances before joining Sevilla in 2017. In January 2019, he was sent back to Italy on loan with Fiorentina. In June 2019, Muriel signed for Atalanta for a reported €18 million. In his first season, he recorded 18 league goals and guided Atalanta to UEFA Champions League qualification for the first time in the club's history. The following season, he finished as the third top goalscorer in the Serie A, behind only Cristiano Ronaldo and Romelu Lukaku. Consequently, Atalanta qualified for a second consecutive Champions League tournament; for his efforts, Muriel was included in the 2020–21 Serie A Team of the Year.

Muriel was previously a Colombian international, having represented his nation at a full international level since 2012. He made his senior debut in June 2012, in a World Cup qualifying match against Ecuador, and scored his first goal the following year, netting against Guatemala. He later took part at the 2015, 2019, and 2021 editions of the Copa América, as well as the 2018 FIFA World Cup.

== Club career ==
=== Deportivo Cali ===
Having spent his formative years with Atlético Junior, Muriel joined Colombian Primera A side Deportivo Cali in January 2009. He made his debut against Envigado FC on 12 July 2009 in what would be his only appearance for the year before scoring nine goals in 10 appearances the following season. Muriel's early form for Deportivo Cali, which included a hat-trick against Once Caldas in his third match, earned him the nickname "the Colombian Ronaldo", in comparison to former Brazil striker Ronaldo, and midway through the season he was signed by Italian Serie A side Udinese.

=== Udinese ===
Udinese officially completed the signing of Muriel on 30 May 2010 for a reported fee of €1.5m. In terms of the transfer agreement, Udinese obtained 70% of Muriel's playing rights with the remaining 30% being retained by Deportivo. Shortly after his arrival in Udine, however, he was loaned to Segunda División side Granada.

==== Loans to Granada & Lecce ====
Muriel completed his loan move to Granada on 12 July 2010. The club achieved promotion to La Liga for the first time in 35 years but it was an unsuccessful spell for Muriel, as he made only seven appearances for the season and failed to score.

Upon the expiration of his loan with Granada, Muriel was loaned out again for the following season to fellow Serie A side, Lecce. He made his debut for the club on 27 October 2011, coming on as a second-half substitute for Daniele Corvia in a 2–0 loss to Palermo. On his first start for the club the following month, against Cesena, Muriel was sent off for two bookable offences. Lecce hung on to claim a 1–0 victory, however, thanks to a goal from fellow countryman and Udinese-loanee, Juan Cuadrado. He improved to end the campaign with a return of seven goals in 29 appearances, though his efforts were not enough to prevent Lecce from being relegated to Serie B. His form during the course of the season garnered the attention of A.C. Milan and Internazionale, with both clubs making official offers to sign him, but Muriel confirmed that he would be returning to Udinese.

==== Return to Udinese ====
Muriel's poor physical condition upon his return to Udinese drew the ire of Francesco Guidolin, with the club manager insisting that he needed to lose 5 pounds (2.3 kg), despite the player scoring four goals against Arta Cedarchis in a pre-season friendly. He was able to get in shape for the start of the season and made his debut in a 2–1 defeat against Fiorentina on 25 August 2012, providing the assist to Maicosuel for the opening goal. He signed a contract extension the following month, signing an improved five-year deal with the club. In January 2012, Muriel was awarded the Serie A Best Young Revelation award alongside Milan's Stephan El Shaarawy in recognition of his form with Lecce and Udinese the previous year. By the conclusion of the season, he had contributed a return of 11 goals in 22 Serie A appearances, despite having missed nearly four months of football because of a hairline fracture of his left femur.

The following season, in the qualifying playoff rounds of the 2013–14 UEFA Europa League, Muriel scored his first ever European goals, netting twice in a 3–1 victory over Široki Brijeg and in his first league match of the season, scored against reigning Coppa Italia champions, Lazio in a 2–1 loss. His form declined however, as he struggled with weight and injury issues, and over the course of the next season-and-a-half he scored only four goals in 35 league appearances, including a spell without any goals in 11 matches from the start of the 2014–15 Serie A season. He ultimately amassed 15 goals in 57 appearances for the club, before leaving to join Sampdoria in 2015.

=== Sampdoria ===
In spite of his struggles with Udinese, Sampdoria completed the double loan signings of Muriel and teammate Andrea Coda on 22 January 2015, with an obligation to purchase both players at the end of the season for a combined sum of €12m. In terms of the agreement, Muriel signed a contract with Sampdoria until 30 June 2019. He scored four times in 16 appearances during his loan spell before completing a permanent transfer at the end of the season. In his final campaign with the club he recorded a career best return of 11 league goals and five assists, which prompted Sevilla to break their club record to sign him at the end of the season.

=== Sevilla ===
On 11 July 2017, La Liga side Sevilla announced the signing of Muriel for a reported club-record fee €20m, with potential add-ons. He made his debut on 19 August, starting in a 1–1 draw with Espanyol and scored his first goal for the club on 17 September, netting the winner in a 1–0 victory over Girona.

Following a disappointing debut campaign, in which he only scored 9 goals in 46 appearances, Muriel found himself behind Wissam Ben Yedder and new club signings André Silva and Quincy Promes in the pecking order for Sevilla the following season.

==== Loan to Fiorentina ====
On 2 January 2019, Muriel returned to Serie A after signing with Fiorentina on loan for the remainder of the season. He scored a hat-trick on his non-competitive debut a week later in a win over Maltese side, Hibernians before making his official debut on 14 January in a 2–0 Coppa Italia win over Torino. He then scored twice on his league debut on 20 January during a 3–3 draw with former club, Sampdoria. On 30 January, Muriel scored and assisted in a 7-1 Coppa Italia victory over Roma.

In total, Muriel scored six league goals and three cup goals during his loan spell but was not signed permanently after the club underwent a change in ownership.

=== Atalanta ===
On 21 June 2019, after a successful loan spell with Fiorentina, Muriel returned to Serie A after signing with Atalanta in a permanent deal worth a reported €18 million. For the 2020–21 Atalanta season, he was the team's top goalscorer in Serie A league games (22 goals), and for all competitions (26 goals).

=== Orlando City ===
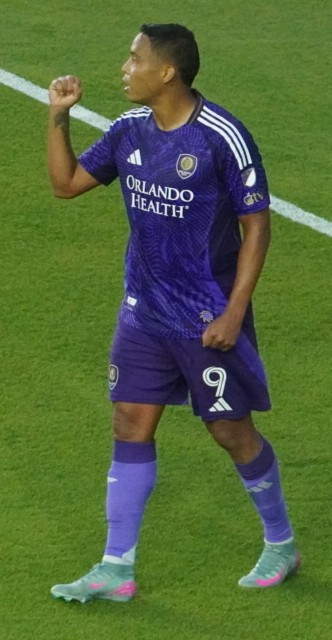
Muriel with Orlando City in 2025

On 15 February 2024, Major League Soccer club Orlando City announced the signing of Muriel as a Designated Player on a three-year contract. On 11 May, Muriel scored his first goals for the club by securing a brace in a 3–2 win over Philadelphia Union with the help of two assists from Nicolás Lodeiro. Muriel's brace would see him named to the Team of the Matchday for the first time in his career. Muriel only managed five goals and six assists across all competitions in his first season with Orlando City, and he spoke about how he struggled to adapt to the new league, describing 2024 as a "transition year".

Muriel's second season with Orlando City began much more productively, with him tallying five goals and three assists across 13 appearances. Muriel described his improvement being a result of him doing the "mental work" to help him adjust to the demands of Major League Soccer and striking a better balance between the work he was doing both on and off the field. However, after a good start to the season, Muriel struggled to score. Matthew Doyle, an analyst for the league, wrote that "Muriel doesn't have the gas in the tank to be a full-time starter in this league" and that Orlando City were a "good team" missing a clinical striker. On 6 August 2025, Muriel broke a 14-game streak without a goal when he scored a first-half hat-trick in the Leagues Cup against Necaxa in a 5–1 win, which was the fastest hat-trick in team and competition history (11 minutes, 30 seconds) and made him the first player to score a hat-trick in the first half of a match for the team. In the following match against Orlando City's rivals Inter Miami four days later, Muriel scored a brace and got an assist in a 4–1 win, a performance which would see him named Player of the Matchday a day later. In Muriel's second season, he improved upon his goal-scoring tally with 12 goals across all competitions. With an additional eight assists, Muriel managed 20 goal contributions.

=== Junior ===
On 14 January 2026, Muriel signed with his boyhood club Junior for an undisclosed fee and a sell-on percentage. Muriel made his debut as a substitute in a 2–0 loss at home to Deportes Tolima four days later, despite two second-half red cards to the visitors. Muriel was awarded a red card for a tackle on Jan Ángulo using his studs, but the red card was overturned and downgraded to a yellow card after a VAR review determined that Muriel had struck Ángulo in the boot. Muriel scored his first goal for Junior via a free kick against Deportivo Pereira on 2 February, securing a 3–2 win. On 2 June, Muriel scored two goals in a 3–0 win in the first leg of the 2026 Torneo Apertura final against Atlético Nacional, and on 8 June, Junior lost to Atlético Nacional 1–0, but won the final 3–1 on aggregate. Muriel also finished as the Apertura's joint highest goalscorer.

== Personal life ==
On 4 February 2025, Muriel's 24-year-old brother-in-law, Luis Fernando Ramírez Lindo, was shot and killed in Maicao by a group of heavily armed hitmen who attacked him with an Uzi as he drove a van in the El Carmen neighbourhood. Luis Fernando worked as a merchant.

== International career ==
=== Youth team ===
Muriel represented Colombia at U20 level and featured for the nation at the 2011 FIFA U-20 World Cup for which Colombia were the host nation. On 6 August 2011, having previously scored twice against France, he scored the only goal of the match as Colombia defeated South Korea 1–0 to progress from the group stages with a perfect record. Muriel ultimately scored four goals for the tournament before Colombia were knocked out by Mexico in the quarter-finals.

=== Senior team ===
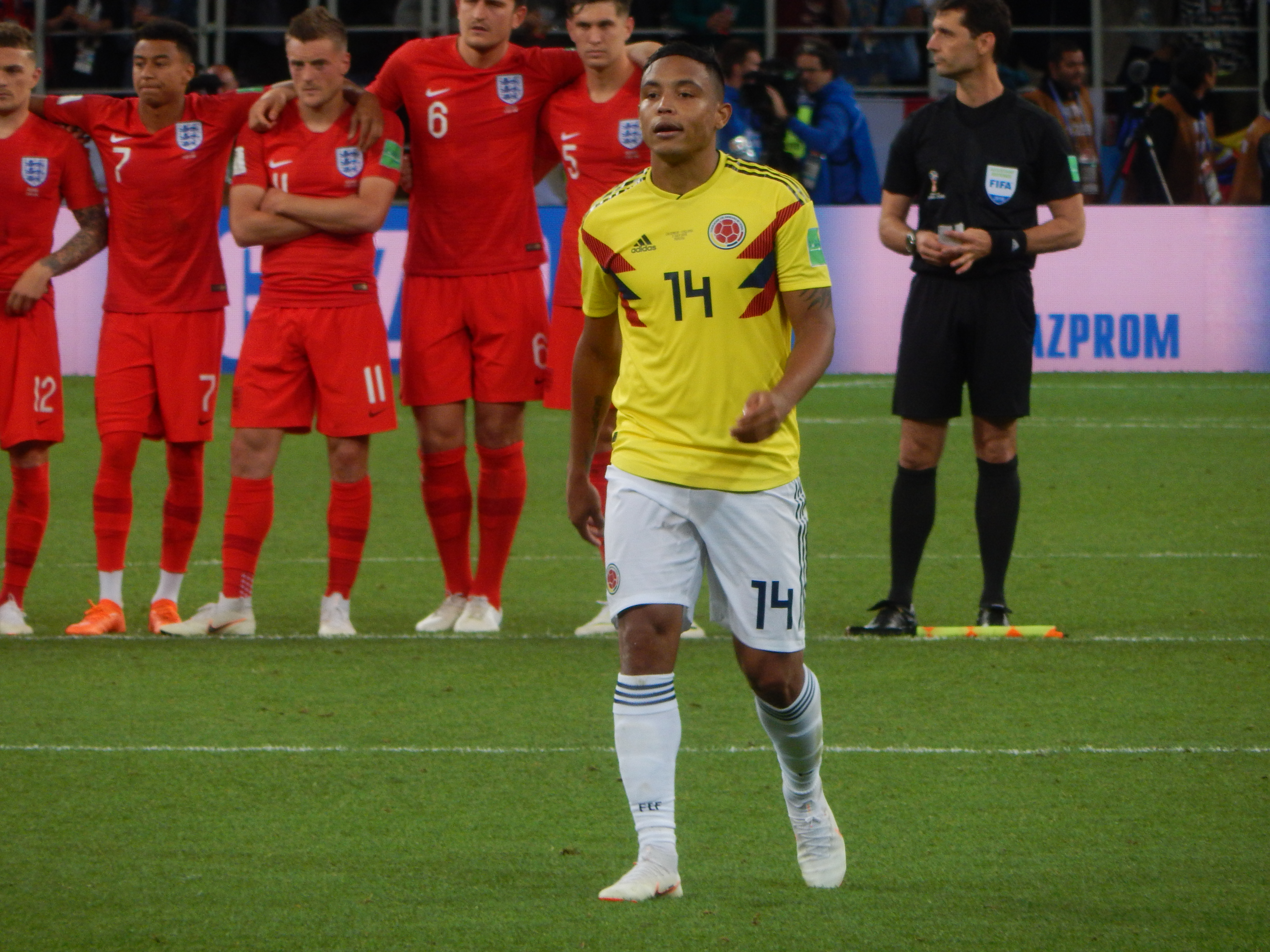
Muriel stepping up to take a penalty kick during Colombia's penalty shoot-out defeat to England at the 2018 FIFA World Cup.

Muriel received his first senior call-up by José Pékerman in 2012 and debuted in a 1–0 World Cup qualifier loss against Ecuador on 10 June.

On 6 February 2013, he scored his first goal in a friendly match against Guatemala. The following year, he was one of seven players cut from Colombia's extended squad for the 2014 FIFA World Cup in Brazil. He was a member of Colombia's squad for the 2015 Copa América but was overlooked for the Copa América Centenario the following year.

In May 2018 he was named in Colombia's preliminary 35-man squad for the 2018 FIFA World Cup in Russia. He featured sporadically as Colombia reached the Round of 16 where they were eliminated following a penalty shoot-out defeat to England. The following summer, Muriel was included in the 23-man Colombia squad for the 2019 Copa América in Brazil.

On 9 July 2021, Muriel assisted Luis Díaz's match–winning goal in a 3–2 victory against Peru in the third-place match of the 2021 Copa América.

== Style of play ==
In his youth, Muriel was often praised in the media for his precocious performances during his early career in Italy, which led him to win the Serie A Best Young Revelation Award in 2012. Several footballing figures in Italy, such as manager Massimiliano Allegri, have recognised Muriel for his speed and technique on the ball, as well as the potential which he already demonstrated as a youngster; his former Udinese teammate Antonio Di Natale even compared him to Alexis Sánchez in 2013. Although Muriel is usually deployed as a centre-forward, he is a versatile forward, who is capable of playing in several offensive positions; indeed, during the 2012–13 season, under his former Udinese manager Francesco Guidolin, he also demonstrated his creative capabilities in a more withdrawn, central role behind another striker, which frequently saw him operate as either a second striker or attacking midfielder. He is also capable of playing as a winger. A fast, talented, creative, two-footed, and technically gifted striker, with good dribbling skills, pace, agility, acceleration, movement, and an eye for goal, Muriel's playing style, physical build, and appearance have led him to be compared to former Brazil striker Ronaldo. Muriel has stated that this comparison is likely due to the fact that, as a youngster, he was an admirer of Ronaldo during the latter's time with Inter Milan. Muriel went on to say that he supported Inter Milan because Ronaldo was playing for them at the time, and that he was initially a Milan fan. Coincidentally, Muriel also stated that, like his childhood idol, he also suffers from weight issues, and even had to lose five kg at one point during the 2012–13 season. This meant that he had to be consistent with his fitness regime, which enabled him to achieve a similar level of athletic ability to Ronaldo. Aside from Ronaldo, another one of Muriel's major influences as a footballer in his youth was compatriot Iván Valenciano. Despite his ability, he is also known to be inconsistent.

== Career statistics ==
=== Club ===
As of match played 31 October 2026

Appearances and goals by club, season and competition
Club	Season	League			National cup (Note: Includes Coppa Italia, Copa del Rey, U.S. Open Cup, and Copa Colombia)		Continental		Other		Total	
Club	Season	Division	Apps	Goals	Apps	Goals	Apps	Goals	Apps	Goals	Apps	Goals
Deportivo Cali	2009	Categoría Primera A	1	0	—		—		—		1	0
Deportivo Cali	2010	Categoría Primera A	10	9	—		—		—		10	9
Deportivo Cali	Total		11	9	—		—		—		11	9
Udinese	2010–11	Serie A	0	0	0	0	—		—		0	0
Udinese	2012–13	Serie A	22	11	1	0	0	0	—		23	11
Udinese	2013–14	Serie A	24	4	3	2	4 (Note: Appearances in UEFA Europa League)	2	—		31	8
Udinese	2014–15	Serie A	11	0	0	0	—		—		11	0
Udinese	Total		57	15	4	2	4	2	—		65	19
Granada (loan)	2010–11	La Liga	7	0	2	0	—		—		9	0
Lecce (loan)	2011–12	Serie A	29	7	0	0	—		—		29	7
Sampdoria (loan)	2014–15	Serie A	16	4	0	0	—		—		16	4
Sampdoria	2015–16	Serie A	32	6	1	0	2	1	—		35	7
Sampdoria	2016–17	Serie A	31	11	2	2	—		—		33	13
Sampdoria	Sampdoria total		79	21	3	2	2	1	—		84	24
Sevilla	2017–18	La Liga	29	7	9	2	8 (Note: Appearances in UEFA Champions League)	0	—		46	9
Sevilla	2018–19	La Liga	6	1	2	0	10	3	1 (Note: Appearance in Supercopa de España)	0	19	4
Sevilla	Total		35	8	11	2	18	3	1	0	65	13
Fiorentina (loan)	2018–19	Serie A	19	6	4	3	—		—		23	9
Atalanta	2019–20	Serie A	34	18	1	0	6	1	—		41	19
Atalanta	2020–21	Serie A	36	22	5	1	7	3	—		48	26
Atalanta	2021–22	Serie A	27	9	2	1	10 (Note: Five appearances and one goal in UEFA Champions League, five appearances and three goals in UEFA Europa League)	4	—		39	14
Atalanta	2022–23	Serie A	29	3	2	0	—		—		31	3
Atalanta	2023–24	Serie A	18	2	2	0	5	4	—		25	6
Atalanta	Total		144	54	12	2	28	12	—		184	68
Orlando City	2024	Major League Soccer	33	5	—		3 (Note: Appearances in CONCACAF Champions Cup)	0	7 (Note: Two appearances in Leagues Cup, five appearances in MLS Cup playoffs)	0	43	5
Orlando City	2025	Major League Soccer	33	9	1	0	—		7 (Note: Six appearances and three goals in Leagues Cup, one appearance in MLS Cup playoffs)	3	41	12
Orlando City	Total		66	14	1	0	3	0	14	3	84	17
Junior	2026	Categoría Primera A	37	16	2	2	6 (Note: Appearances in Copa Libertadores)	3	1 (Note: Appearance in Superliga Colombiana)	0	46	21
Career total			480	150	39	13	61	21	16	3	600	187

=== International ===
As of match played 24 March 2022

Appearances and goals by national team and year
National team	Year	Apps	Goals
Colombia	2012	1	0
Colombia	2013	4	1
Colombia	2014	0	0
Colombia	2015	3	0
Colombia	2016	6	0
Colombia	2017	3	0
Colombia	2018	5	1
Colombia	2019	10	3
Colombia	2020	4	2
Colombia	2021	8	1
Colombia	2022	1	0
Total		45	8

Scores and results list Colombia's goal tally first, score column indicates score after each Muriel goal.

List of international goals scored by Luis Muriel
No.	Date	Venue	Opponent	Score	Result	Competition
1	6 February 2013	Sun Life Stadium, Miami Gardens, United States	Guatemala	4–1	4–1	Friendly
2	23 March 2018	Stade de France, Saint-Denis, France	France	1–2	3–2	Friendly
3	3 June 2019	Estadio El Campín, Bogotá, Colombia	Panama	2–0	3–0	Friendly
4	6 September 2019	Hard Rock Stadium, Miami Gardens, United States	Brazil	1–1	2–2	Friendly
5	6 September 2019	Hard Rock Stadium, Miami Gardens, United States	Brazil	2–1	2–2	Friendly
6	9 October 2020	Estadio Metropolitano Roberto Meléndez, Barranquilla, Colombia	Venezuela	2–0	3–0	2022 FIFA World Cup qualification
7	9 October 2020	Estadio Metropolitano Roberto Meléndez, Barranquilla, Colombia	Venezuela	3–0	3–0	2022 FIFA World Cup qualification
8	8 June 2021	Estadio Metropolitano Roberto Meléndez, Barranquilla, Colombia	Argentina	1–2	2–2	2022 FIFA World Cup qualification

== Honours ==
Atalanta

- UEFA Europa League: 2023–24

Colombia U20

- Toulon Tournament: 2011

Colombia

- Copa América third place: 2021

Junior

- Liga DIMAYOR Torneo Apertura: 2026

Individual

- Serie A Best Young Revelation: 2012
- Serie A Player of the Month: April 2021
- Serie A Team of the Year: 2020–21
- Liga DIMAYOR Torneo Apertura Golden Boot: 2026
