= Davide Faraoni =

Italian footballer (born 1991)

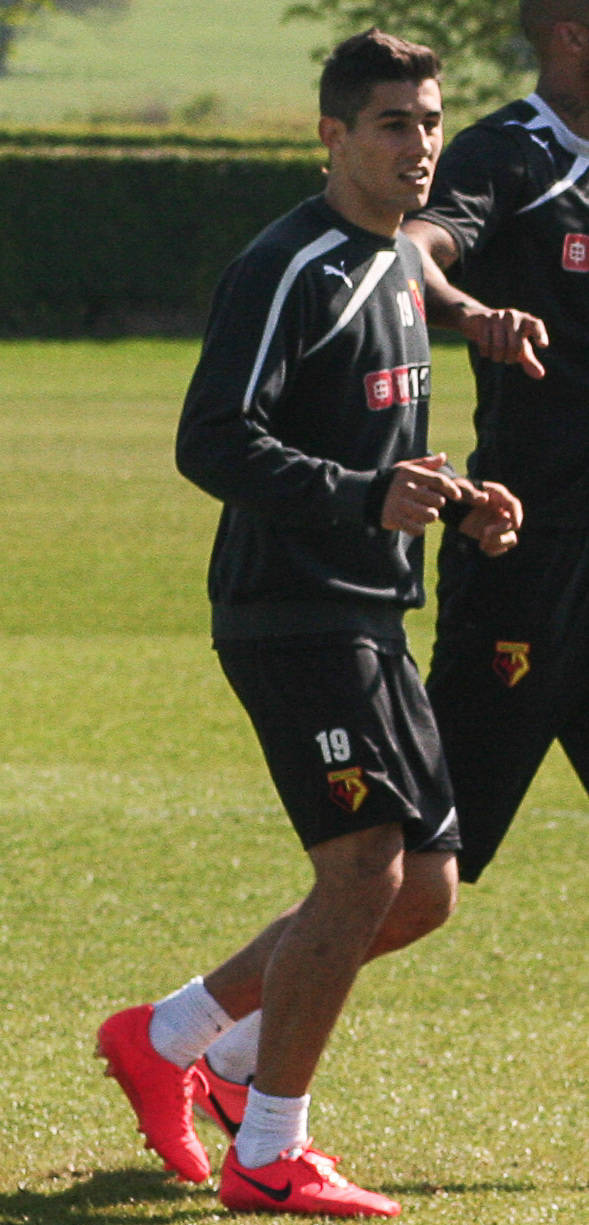
- Faraoni with Watford in 2014

Personal information
- Full name: Marco Davide Faraoni
- Date of birth: 25 October 1991 (age 35)
- Place of birth: Bracciano, Italy
- Height: 1.80 m (5 ft 11 in)
- Position: Right-back

Youth career
- 1997–1998: ASD Bracciano
- 1998–2010: Lazio
- 2010–2011: Inter Milan

Senior career*
| Years | Team | Apps | (Gls) |
| 2011–2012 | Inter Milan | 14 | (1) |
| 2012–2013 | Udinese | 11 | (0) |
| 2013–2014 | Watford | 38 | (2) |
| 2014–2017 | Udinese | 5 | (0) |
| 2015 | → Perugia (loan) | 15 | (1) |
| 2015–2016 | → Novara (loan) | 36 | (0) |
| 2017–2019 | Crotone | 43 | (3) |
| 2019 | → Hellas Verona (loan) | 17 | (3) |
| 2019–2025 | Hellas Verona | 144 | (15) |
| 2024 | → Fiorentina (loan) | 8 | (0) |
| 2025–2026 | Pescara | 12 | (1) |

International career
| 2006–2007 | Italy U16 | 5 | (0) |
| 2007–2008 | Italy U17 | 11 | (0) |
| 2009 | Italy U18 | 5 | (0) |
| 2008–2010 | Italy U19 | 6 | (0) |
| 2011 | Italy U20 | 1 | (0) |
| 2010–2012 | Italy U21 | 7 | (0) |
- * Club domestic league appearances and goals as of 13 May 2026

Marco Davide Faraoni (born 25 October 1991) is an Italian professional footballer who plays as a right-back.

== Club career ==
=== Youth career ===
Born in Bracciano, in the Province of Rome, Lazio region, Faraoni started his career at Rome-based club S.S. Lazio, for which he could play right or centre-back. He missed a few months in the 2009–10 season due to a right leg anterior cruciate ligament injury. Faraoni had played for Lazio's Giovanissimi regionali team to Primavera team.

On 1 July 2010, he was signed by Inter Milan on a four-year contract on a reported free transfer. He was a member of Inter's Primavera under-20 team in the 2010–11 season. With the team, he also won the 2011 Torneo di Viareggio. He played various positions for the team, from right-back and left-back to right wing. Under new coach Leonardo, he was named in the first team squad several times but never made his first team debut in the 2010–11 season.

Faraoni did not play in the reserve league playoff round, as coach Fulvio Pea and the technical team chose to rest him and Alibec, two of the three senior players of the reserves.

=== Inter Milan ===
Faraoni graduated from the youth team in 2011. Under new coach Gian Piero Gasperini, he played in pre-season friendlies, usually as a wing-back in 3–4–3 formation. and made his competitive debut in 2011 Supercoppa Italiana in Beijing. That match Gasperini used his symbolic 3–5–2 formation in the first half but changed to 4–4–1–1 in the second; Faraoni substituted midfielder Ricardo Álvarez in the 63rd minute, as a left-midfielder. He made his Serie A debut 3 months later, under new coach Claudio Ranieri, replacing Jonathan in the last minutes. That match Inter won against Cagliari 2–1. He was the only backup right-back of the team on UCL matchday 5 as Maicon had not yet recovered. He made his European debut in that match, replacing Ricky Álvarez on 22 November 2011, a 1–1 draw with Trabzonspor.

Faraoni played five out of a possible six matches for Inter in December, all as right midfielder. The first match was his first start in his professional career, losing to Udinese 0–1 on 3 December. In the next game, Faraoni played his first European start, losing to CSKA, but Inter already qualified as group winners before that match. He then played 3 out of 4 successive league matches, as a midfielder, in which Inter won all 4 matches and climbed from the bottom half to 5th before the winter break. Faraoni was highly rated in the first match (v. Fiorentina) but he was substituted at half time in the second (v. Genoa, by Álvarez, who made a winning assist) and third matches (v. Lecce, by Cambiasso). In those 4 league appearances, Zanetti moved from right midfielder to right-back twice (against Udinese & Genoa, Maicon was injured/rested, whilst he was suspended v. Fiorentina), and as central midfielder (v. Lecce, Cambiasso on the bench); while his right wing-back competitor Nagatomo was played as a left-back to replace injured Chivu in the latter 3 matches. Faraoni missed the match against Cesena on 18 December as Zanetti and Maicon restored to their usual positions.

Despite being returned to a 'backup' role on 7 January 2012 against Parma, Faraoni came on as a substitute and scored his first ever Serie A goal, in the 77th minute. He hit a stunning volley from the edge of the area which lobbed the Parma goalkeeper and crowned a 5–0 win. On 12 January 2012, Inter announced that Faraoni had signed a new 4 1/2-year contract. A week later, Faraoni made his Italian cup debut in a 2–1 win over Genoa.

Faraoni returned to the starting XI on 17 February, playing three successive Serie A matches. Since late January Inter had suffered from an injury crisis (Alvarez, Maicon and then Chivu twice), poor form and the departure of star player (Thiago Motta) and did not win any games with only two draws. The coach had changed the formation occasionally to fit the recovered Wesley Sneijder but there was no improvement. Faraoni had played as a right wing in 4–2–3–1 formation against Bologna (as the coach had limited choices of winger since the injury of Alvarez) and then starting right-back (due to the injuries of Maicon and Chivu, Nagatomo had to play left-back) for the first time in the 4–3–1–2 formation against Napoli. The third match saw the return of the 4–4–2 formation with Faraoni as a right midfielder. However, he was substituted for Sneijder at half time after the first half finished 0–2 against Catania. Eventually Inter 2–2 draw with Catania, their first point since January.

After the appointment of Andrea Stramaccioni, Faraoni was left out from the starting XI completely.

=== Udinese ===
On 9 July 2012, Udinese Calcio claimed half of the registration rights of Faraoni due to them being transferred as part of the deal that saw 50% rights of Samir Handanovič go the other way. Faraoni made his debut on 25 August 2012, in the match against Fiorentina. On 19 June 2013, Udinese redeemed the other half of Faraoni for an undisclosed fee, selling the remaining 50% registration rights of Handanovič to Inter in the same formula.

=== Watford ===
On 6 July 2013, Faraoni's agent confirmed to Sky Sports that he would be joining Watford on a five-year deal. Watford was owned by Gino Pozzo, son of Udinese owner Giampaolo Pozzo.

In Faraoni's first season he was given the number 19. He made his Watford debut away to Birmingham City on 3 August 2013. Faraoni scored his first Watford goal away to Reading on 17 August 2013, heading home a corner in the second half. He scored his first cup goal against Norwich in a 3–2 loss. After one season and 43 appearances for Watford (38 in the league), Faraoni announced on Twitter he would be heading back to Italy in July 2014.

=== Return to Udinese ===
After one season with Watford, Faraoni re-signed for Udinese in July 2014. On 3 September 2015 Faraoni was signed by Novara Calcio in a temporary deal.

Faraoni once again returned to Udinese in the summer of 2016. On 10 March 2017 he had an operation on his left knee (removal of an intra–articular fragment), at Villa Stuart, the same clinic he had had an operation on his right knee in 2009.

=== Crotone ===
Faraoni canceled his contract with Udinese on 8 July 2017. On the next day, Faraoni signed a three-year contract with fellow Serie A club Crotone.

=== Hellas Verona ===
On 14 January 2019, Faraoni joined Hellas Verona on loan with an obligation to buy.

==== Loan to Fiorentina ====
On 13 January 2024, Hellas Verona sent Faraoni on loan to fellow Serie A side Fiorentina until the end of the season, with an option-to-buy. He was an unused substitute in Fiorentina's 1–0 extra-time defeat to Olympiacos in the 2024 UEFA Europa Conference League final on 29 May.

=== Pescara ===
On 27 November 2025, Faraoni signed with Serie B club Pescara.

== International career ==
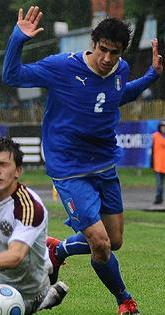
Faraoni playing for Italy U-19's

Faraoni was a regular member of the Azzurrini (Young azure, the nickname of Italian youth teams). After made his U-16 debut, he was named in the squad of the 2006 U16 international Val-de-Marne tournament. Faraoni was a member of the U17 for the 2008 Minsk youth tournament.

He started two out of three matches of 2008 UEFA European Under-17 Football Championship elite qualification, which Azzurrini finished as the third and eliminated. As U-19 (born 1990) team also eliminated from the 2009 edition of UEFA European Under-19 Football Championship, Faraoni promoted to U-19 directly and made his debut against Romania in December 2008 FIGC also organized a U-18 friendly for the same age group in January and Faraoni played, winning Denmark 3–0. Missed a game in March against Norway, he played the match against Ukraine U-19 (born 1990) team in April, and played all four matches in a U-18 Slovakia Cup. Missed the match against Denmark U-19, the qualification and two more friendlies due to injury, Faraoni returned to the U-19 team in April 2010, defeating Switzerland 1–0. He then played all 3 matches of the 2010 UEFA European Under-19 Football Championship elite qualification., but dropped from the final squad by the coach Massimo Piscedda.

In November 2010, he received his first U-21 call-up from the new coach Ciro Ferrara; on 17 November he made his debut in the friendly match against Turkey played in Fermo. That match Inter had a dominated 5 members (out of 23-men) in the squad, namely forward Mattia Destro, defender Giulio Donati, Luca Caldirola and Cristiano Biraghi. (which the latter two remains in 2011–12 Inter squad). Except missed one in February (played for U-20 instead), he played three successive games (despite not call-up to 2011 Toulon Tournament) and benched on 10 August, became one of the regular member of Azzurrini along with Inter team-mate Francesco Bardi, Caldirola, Donati and Davide Santon (1 keeper, 1 centre-back and 2 fullbacks) He was the third choice right-back for Azzurrini at 2013 UEFA European Under-21 Football Championship qualification, behind Santon (a Newcastle player since late August) and Donati (who later swapped the role with Santon). He made his debut in that tournament in round 5 on 15 November 2011, replacing winger Antonino Ragusa. However, after lack of chance under Inter coach Andrea Stramaccioni, Faraoni was dropped out from U21 squad.

== Career statistics ==
As of match played 15 March 2025

Appearances and goals by club, season and competition
| Club | Season | League | | | National cup | | Continental | | Other | | Total | |
| Club | Season | Division | Apps | Goals | Apps | Goals | Apps | Goals | Apps | Goals | Apps | Goals |
|---|---|---|---|---|---|---|---|---|---|---|---|---|
| Inter Milan | 2011–12 | Serie A | 14 | 1 | 1 | 0 | 2 (Note: Appearances in UEFA Champions League) | 0 | 1 (Note: Appearance in Supercoppa Italiana) | 0 | 18 | 1 |
| Udinese | 2012–13 | Serie A | 11 | 0 | 0 | 0 | 6 (Note: Appearances in UEFA Europa League) | 0 | — | | 17 | 0 |
| Watford | 2013–14 | Championship | 38 | 2 | 2 | 1 | — | | 3 (Note: Appearances in Football League Cup) | 1 | 43 | 4 |
| Udinese | 2014–15 | Serie A | 0 | 0 | 0 | 0 | — | | — | | 0 | 0 |
| Udinese | 2016–17 | Serie A | 5 | 0 | 0 | 0 | — | | — | | 5 | 0 |
| Udinese | Total | | 5 | 0 | 0 | 0 | — | | — | | 5 | 0 |
| Perugia (loan) | 2014–15 | Serie B | 15 | 1 | — | | — | | — | | 15 | 1 |
| Novara (loan) | 2015–16 | Serie B | 36 | 0 | 0 | 0 | — | | — | | 36 | 0 |
| Crotone | 2017–18 | Serie A | 28 | 2 | 2 | 0 | — | | — | | 30 | 2 |
| Crotone | 2018–19 | Serie B | 15 | 1 | 2 | 0 | — | | — | | 17 | 1 |
| Crotone | Total | | 43 | 3 | 4 | 0 | — | | — | | 47 | 3 |
| Hellas Verona (loan) | 2018–19 | Serie B | 17 | 3 | — | | — | | 5 (Note: Appearances in Serie B promotion play-offs) | 0 | 22 | 3 |
| Hellas Verona | 2019–20 | Serie A | 36 | 5 | 1 | 0 | — | | — | | 37 | 5 |
| Hellas Verona | 2020–21 | Serie A | 34 | 4 | 2 | 0 | — | | — | | 36 | 4 |
| Hellas Verona | 2021–22 | Serie A | 32 | 4 | 0 | 0 | — | | — | | 32 | 4 |
| Hellas Verona | 2022–23 | Serie A | 23 | 2 | 1 | 0 | — | | 1 (Note: Appearance in Serie relegation tie-breaker) | 1 | 25 | 3 |
| Hellas Verona | 2023–24 | Serie A | 11 | 0 | 0 | 0 | — | | — | | 11 | 0 |
| Hellas Verona | 2024–25 | Serie A | 8 | 0 | 0 | 0 | — | | — | | 8 | 0 |
| Hellas Verona | Total | | 161 | 18 | 4 | 0 | — | | 6 | 1 | 171 | 19 |
| Fiorentina (loan) | 2023–24 | Serie A | 8 | 0 | 0 | 0 | 2 (Note: Appearances in UEFA Europa Conference League) | 0 | 1 | 0 | 11 | 0 |
| Pescara | 2025–26 | Serie B | 2 | 0 | 0 | 0 | 0 | 0 | 0 | 0 | 2 | 0 |
| Career total | | | 333 | 25 | 11 | 1 | 10 | 0 | 11 | 2 | 363 | 28 |

== Honours ==
Inter Milan

- Supercoppa Italiana runner-up: 2011

Fiorentina

- UEFA Europa Conference League runner-up: 2023–24
