= Željko Brkić =

Serbian footballer (born 1986)

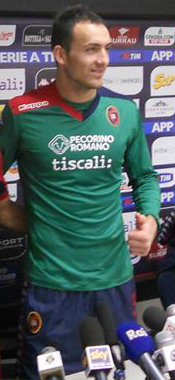
- Brkić with Cagliari in 2015

Personal information
- Full name: Željko Brkić
- Date of birth: 9 July 1986 (age 40)
- Place of birth: Novi Sad, SR Serbia, SFR Yugoslavia
- Height: 1.98 m (6 ft 6 in)
- Position: Goalkeeper

Youth career
- Indeks Novi Sad
- Vojvodina

Senior career*
Years	Team	Apps	(Gls)
2004–2011	Vojvodina	96	(0)
2004–2005	→ Kabel (loan)		
2005–2007	→ Proleter Novi Sad (loan)	31	(0)
2011–2016	Udinese	43	(0)
2011–2012	→ Siena (loan)	18	(0)
2015	→ Cagliari (loan)	21	(0)
2015–2016	→ Carpi (loan)	4	(0)
2016–2018	PAOK	7	(0)
2020–2021	Vojvodina	0	(0)
Total		218	(0)

International career
2007–2009	Serbia U21	12	(0)
2010–2015	Serbia	11	(0)
Medal record
PAOK
Winner	Greek Football Cup	2016–17
- * Club domestic league appearances and goals

Željko Brkić (Serbian Cyrillic: Жељко Бркић, born 9 July 1986) is a Serbian retired footballer who played as a goalkeeper.

== Club career ==
=== Early career in Serbia ===
Brkić, playing in the goalkeeper position, started his career as a professional began at the club Indeks Novi Sad and Vojvodina, before playing professionally at Vojvodina. Brkić loaned him to Proleter Novi Sad in 2005, where he stayed for the club about two years. At Proleter Novi Sad, Brkić made thirty-one appearances. After his return from loan, Brkić made his debut for the club, in a 1–0 win over Napredak Kruševac on 2 September 2007. Since then, Brkić soon became a first-choice goalkeeper and soon became the club's captain. At the club, Brkić made a total of 117 appearances.

=== Siena ===
In the summer of 2011, Brkić left Serbia to join Italian side Udinese. Because Udinese ran out of non-EU registration quota for international signing (which Udinese had to buy one from other club) as well as the performance of Slovenian internationals Samir Handanović, Brkić was signed by Serie A club Siena in definitive deal from Vojvodina, which he would transfer back to Udine in a later time. (which just cost Siena for €20,000 as other fee.).

On 11 September 2011, Brkić made his debut in a 0–0 draw against Catania, keeping his first clean sheet on his debut in Serie A. In October, following impressive performances with Siena, Brkić was linked with a move to English side Tottenham Hotspur. In response of a transfer speculation, however, Brkić told Serbian daily Sport that he is aware of the transfer rumour, but insists he is focusing at Siena. Brkić also says he is no rush of leaving the club and insists the move is not affecting his form. After a 2–0 loss against Milan on 17 December 2011 in which Brkić get a yellow card resulting a penalty, Brkić soon had an operation that kept him out for many months after fracturing his left fibula. A year on, Brkić spoke about his injury and find it difficult to come back to recover. In January 2012, Brkić was transferred back to Udinese for free and returned to Siena on a temporary deal also for free. During his injury, Siena used Gianluca Pegolo as first choice. Brkić played his first game since his injury on 22 April. In a 1–1 draw against Bologna on 25 April 2012, Brkić scored an own goal from an Alessandro Diamanti free kick, denying Siena a win.

=== Udinese ===
==== 2012–13 ====
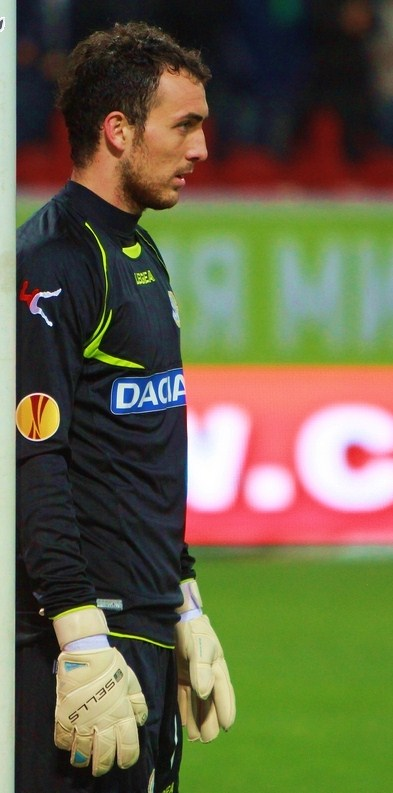
Brkić with Udinese in 2012

After a season with Siena, Brkić became the club's first-choice goalkeeper following Samir Handanović's departure to Inter Milan. Having established himself in the first team, Brkić made his debut for the club in the UEFA Champions League qualification round against Portuguese side Braga. Unfortunately, Udinese was eliminated in the Champions League and demoted to the UEFA Europa League after losing in the penalty shoot-out in the second leg, just three days before he made his league debut in a 2–1 loss against Fiorentina. However, the next game was even went worse for Brkić when he gave away the penalty in early minutes and received a red card in a 4–1 loss against regaining champion Juventus. After the match, former referee Daniele Tombolini says Brkić's sending-off was a mistake because Sebastian Giovinco, the opposition player in the match, did not have possession of the ball, though he maintained his views that the foul was a penalty. Brkić then miss one match against Siena and made his return when Udinese won 2–1 against Milan the next game. On 4 October 2012, Brkić was in goal when Udinese beat Liverpool 3–2, making good save from Luis Suárez twice and a header from Jonjo Shelvey. Unfortunately, Udinese would then be eliminated from the Europa League, following a strings of losses. In mid-January, Brkić soon suffered an injury after fracturing the second finger of his right hand and went to surgery that kept him out at least a month. A month later, Brkić made his return, playing in friendly match against Gemonese on 26 February 2013. After the match, Brkić says he was prepared to make a comeback. Brkić made his return on 3 March 2013 against Pescara, where the club won 1–0. After the match, Brkić returned as a first-choice goalkeeper for the rest of the 2012–13 season.

==== 2013–14 ====
In the 2013–14 season, Brkić was ruled out for the start of the season after injuring his shoulder while exercising in the gym, which ruled him out for four months. During his absence, he was replaced by Simone Scuffet in goal. After three months out of action, Brkić made his return in a 2–1 win over Sassuolo. Brkić's performance with Udinese were praised in the media, who noted that he "saved at least three goal-bound efforts while blocking several strong shots and commanded his area giving sustenance and substance to his whole defence". This earned him Serie A Team of Week 10. Juventus invited schoolchildren to watch their match against Udinese in December in place of banned Ultras, but they shouted abuse at Brkić after each goal kick, and Juventus were fined €5,000.

=== PAOK ===
On 7 July 2016, Brkić signed a three-year deal with Super League Greece club PAOK. Brkić, who had already agreed terms with PAOK's president/technical director Ľuboš Micheľ, passed his medical at the Thessaloniki-based club and then signed his new contract, leaving Italy after five consecutive seasons. Brkić, along with the experienced Greek internationals Panagiotis Glykos and Markos Vellidis, is expected to be part of a very strong triplete in goalkeeper's position for PAOK ahead of 2016–17 season.

== International career ==
Brkić started participating in the national team, playing for Serbia U-21 and was even in the U21 squad for the 2009 UEFA European Under-21 Football Championship despite being age twenty-two. In the European U21 Football Championship, Brkić played three match, all in group-stage. Brkić also managed to keep two clean sheet in the tournament.

On 3 March 2010, Brkić made his senior debut for the national team, coming on for Vladimir Stojković as a substitute in the 81st minute after Stojković suffered an injury during a match, in a 3–0 win over Algeria. In the 2010 FIFA World Cup, Brkić was named for the national team squad ahead of the World Cup. Unfortunately, Brkić was dropped from the squad after manager Radomir Antić trimmed the squad from 24 to 23. Years on, Brkić was the national first choice goalkeeper, beating competition from Vladimir Stojković in the World Cup qualifier. He earned a total of 11 caps and his final international was a June 2015 friendly match against Azerbaijan.

== Career statistics ==
=== Club ===
Appearances and goals by club, season and competition
Club	Season	League			Cup		Continental		Total	
Club	Season	Division	Apps	Goals	Apps	Goals	Apps	Goals	Apps	Goals
Vojvodina	2006–07	Serbian SuperLiga	4	0	0	0	0	0	4	0
Vojvodina	2007–08	Serbian SuperLiga	14	0	0	0	1	0	15	0
Vojvodina	2008–09	Serbian SuperLiga	27	0	2	0	3	0	32	0
Vojvodina	2009–10	Serbian SuperLiga	23	0	4	0	2	0	29	0
Vojvodina	2010–11	Serbian SuperLiga	28	0	6	0	0	0	34	0
Vojvodina	Total		96	0	12	0	6	0	114	0
Udinese	2012–13	Serie A	31	0	0	0	6	0	37	0
Udinese	2013–14	Serie A	12	0	1	0	—		13	0
Udinese	2014–15	Serie A	0	0	0	0	—		0	0
Udinese	Total		43	0	1	0	6	0	50	0
Siena (loan)	2011–12	Serie A	18	0	2	0	—		20	0
Cagliari (loan)	2014–15	Serie A	21	0	0	0	—		21	0
Carpi (loan)	2015–16	Serie A	4	0	3	0	—		7	0
PAOK	2016–17	Super League Greece	7	0	3	0	1	0	11	0
Vojvodina	2020–21	Serbian SuperLiga	0	0	0	0	—		0	0
Career total			189	0	21	0	13	0	223	0

=== International ===
Appearances and goals by national team and year
National team	Year	Apps	Goals
Serbia	2010	3	0
Serbia	2011	2	0
Serbia	2012	4	0
Serbia	2013	1	0
Serbia	2014	0	0
Serbia	2015	1	0
Total		11	0

== Honours ==
Vojvodina

- Serbian SuperLiga runner-up: 2008–09
- Serbian Cup runner-up (3): 2006–07, 2009–10, 2010–11

PAOK

- Super League Greece runner-up: 2016–17
- Greek Football Cup: 2016–17
