= Allan (footballer, born 1991) =

Brazilian footballer

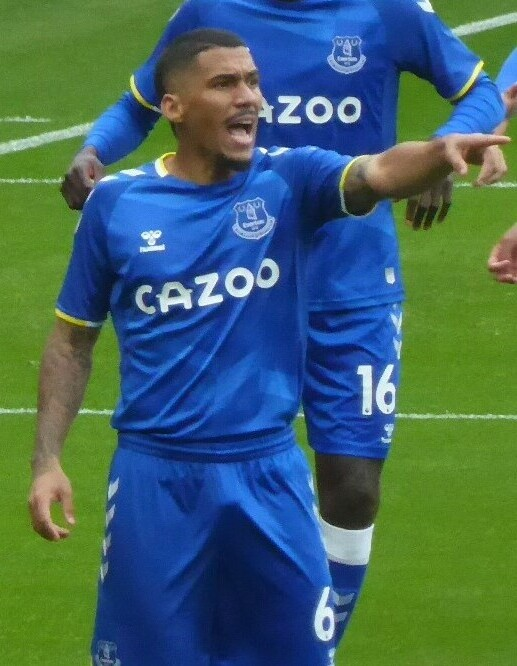
- Allan with Everton in 2021

Personal information
- Full name: Allan Marques Loureiro
- Date of birth: 8 January 1991 (age 35)
- Place of birth: Rio de Janeiro, Brazil
- Height: 1.74 m (5 ft 9 in)
- Position: Defensive midfielder

Team information
- Current team: Botafogo
- Number: 25

Youth career
- 2007–2008: Madureira
- 2008–2009: Vasco da Gama

Senior career*
Years	Team	Apps	(Gls)
2009–2012	Vasco da Gama	55	(0)
2012–2015	Udinese	104	(1)
2015–2020	Napoli	158	(11)
2020–2022	Everton	52	(0)
2022–2024	Al Wahda	45	(3)
2024–	Botafogo	52	(0)

International career
2011	Brazil U20	2	(0)
2018–2020	Brazil	10	(0)
Medal record
Men's football
Representing Brazil
Copa América
Winner	2019 Brazil
FIFA U-20 World Cup
Winner	2011 Colombia
- * Club domestic league appearances and goals as of 11:23, 23 October 2026 (UTC)

Allan Marques Loureiro (born 8 January 1991), commonly known as Allan Marques or Allan (Brazilian Portuguese: [aˈlɐ̃]), is a Brazilian professional footballer who plays as a defensive midfielder for Campeonato Brasileiro Série A club Botafogo.

After starting out in the Madureira youth system in his home country, he joined Uruguayan club Deportivo Maldonado, but later returned to Brazil and made his professional debut with Vasco da Gama in 2009. Allan joined Italian club Udinese in 2012, and subsequently moved to fellow Serie A side Napoli in 2015. He transferred to English side Everton in 2020, where he stayed for two years.

At international level, he was a part of the Brazil under-20 side that won the 2011 FIFA U-20 World Cup, and later made his senior debut for Brazil in 2018; he was a member of the team that won the 2019 Copa América on home soil.

== Club career ==
=== Madureira and Deportivo Maldonado ===
Allan was signed from Madureira by Uruguayan side Deportivo Maldonado at 17 years of age for an undisclosed fee. However, he was later loaned out to Vasco da Gama back in Brazil; he would not make an appearance for Maldonado.

=== Vasco da Gama ===
Allan moved to Vasco da Gama once again still as a youth player, loaned from Deportivo Maldonado. A year after he played for their youth team, he was brought back and promoted to the first-team by coach Dorival Júnior, playing in many crucial games in the club's 2009 season to help the side win the Série B and secure promotion to the top-flight Série A, though he ultimately suffered an injury.

Due to injury, Allan could not compete with Vasco da Gama neither in the Campeonato Carioca nor the 2010 Copa do Brasil. After an initial recovery, he returned to the club's junior team to regain fitness before rejoining the first-team. He then returned to action in the last round of the Série A before the break for the 2011 FIFA U-20 World Cup, playing in the Copa da Hora friendly tournament. The club won the tournament, with Allan contributing to the title, also scoring a goal in a 3–2 victory over Coritiba.

=== Udinese ===
In June 2012, Allan signed for Serie A side Udinese for a reported fee of R$7 million from Deportivo Maldonado. He made his debut for Udinese at home at the Stadio Friuli against Juventus, where he created an assist for teammate Andrea Lazzari's goal.

In his first season in Udine, Allan played mostly as a defensive midfielder, recovering and distributing a large number of balls. Manager Francesco Guidolin played him in 36 games in the league out of 38 games, he proved one of the best bargains of the season, defying expectation and playing almost all games as a starter to help Udinese to finish in a surprise fifth-place position, securing qualification to next year's UEFA Europa League.

The following season the club finished 13th in the league in what was Francesco Guidolin's final season with the side. Despite this, Allan excelled in midfield, and scored his first goals for the club as his improvement in Italy continued. His calm and controlled performance in midfield also prompted future Udinese manager Andrea Stramaccioni to suggest that he was now one of the best young midfielders in Europe, comparable to Manchester United's Paul Pogba.

In the 2014–15 season, Allan was to be the top ball-winner of all of Europe's top-five leagues with the most balls won.

=== Napoli ===
After reported interest from a number of other clubs, Allan signed for Napoli for €10m plus bonuses in July 2015.

In the 2015–16 season, Allan made his Napoli debut in a pre-season friendly against Lega Pro side FeralpiSalò, which Napoli won 5–2. He made his first Serie A debut for Napoli at home against Sampdoria in the second matchday of the Serie A season, creating an assist for Gonzalo Higuaín with a through-ball that the latter converted with a right-footed shot from the right side of the box, making the scoreline 2–0. Allan was later substituted in the second half for David López. Allan would then receive a start in Napoli's third game of the season, a 2–2 away draw with Empoli, scoring an equalizer in the 78th minute after converting a pass from captain Marek Hamšík.

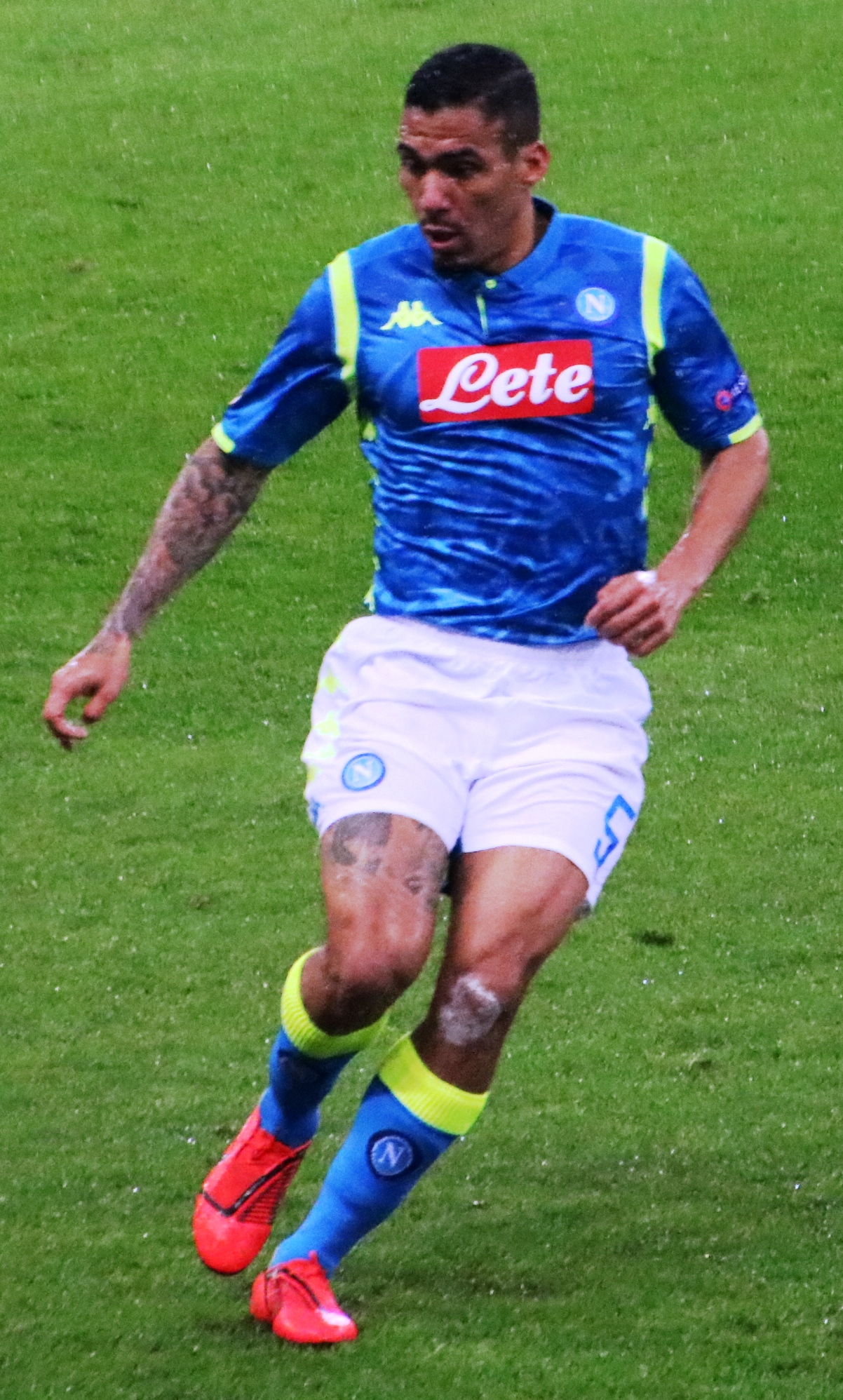
Allan playing for Napoli in 2019

On 17 September 2015, Allan came off the bench in the 62nd minute against Belgian club Club Brugge in his first ever Europa League game, assisting José Callejón's second goal of the game with a through-ball just minutes after coming on. The match finished 5–0 for Napoli, the club's largest European win and the joint-largest margin of defeat for Brugge, equalling its 6–1 defeat at Monaco in 1988. Allan would go on to score once again and provide another assist in a 5–0 win against Lazio, only three days after the Brugge victory on 20 September, giving manager Maurizio Sarri trust in him for his precise passing and defensive work. On 26 September, Allan scored a goal against defending champions Juventus, with excellent passing and an impressive overall game in a 2–1 home win. On 4 October, Allan would score the opening goal in a 0–4 away rout of Milan in a swift counter-attacking move, where the Brazilian went one-on-one with Milan goalkeeper Diego López.

In the 2016–17 season, Allan had 29 Serie A appearances (1 goal, 5 assists), 8 Champions League appearances culminating in an 86.6% pass completion rate, an average of 2.4 successful tackles per game and he also averaged one key pass (one that led to a goalscoring opportunity) per game.

In the 2017–18 season, Allan played in all 38 Serie A matches, scoring four goals. During that season, Allan extended his contract with Napoli until 2023. In the following season, he featured in 33 Serie A matches and reached the 2018–19 UEFA Europa League quarter-finals with Napoli. In the 2019–20 season, he played in the 2019–20 UEFA Champions League round of 16 home match against Barcelona, which ended 1–1, then he won the 2019–20 Coppa Italia against Juventus, his only silverware with Napoli.

=== Everton ===
On 5 September 2020, English club Everton signed Allan for around £21.7m on a three-year deal, to be reunited with former Napoli manager Carlo Ancelotti. He made his debut the following week in a 1–0 win away to Tottenham Hotspur.

Allan suffered an injury to his hamstring on 16 December during an away game against Leicester City, he was replaced in the 41st minute by Andre Gomes; Everton won the game 0–2. Allan was ruled out for the remainder of Everton's games in 2020. He returned to the starting eleven on 1 March against Southampton playing the full 90 minutes, Everton won the game 1–0.

In March 2022, against Newcastle United, Allan was sent off following a tackle on Allan Saint-Maximin. The Brazilian was also given a three-match ban. Everton later went on to win the game 1–0 due to an Alex Iwobi winner in the 99th minute.

=== Al Wahda ===
On 27 September 2022, Allan signed a two-year deal with Emirati club Al Wahda.

== International career ==
=== Under-20 ===
He was called up by Brazilian under-20 coach Ney Franco on 20 August 2011, where he impressed enough at Vasco da Gama to earn a call-up for the 2011 FIFA U-20 World Cup. Brazil's U-20 World Cup-winning side also featured the likes of Oscar, Philippe Coutinho, Casemiro and Danilo, as well as future Napoli teammates Gabriel and Bruno Uvini. Brazil made it to the tournament final, beating Portugal 3–2 in extra time and winning the U20 World Cup for the fifth time.

=== Senior ===
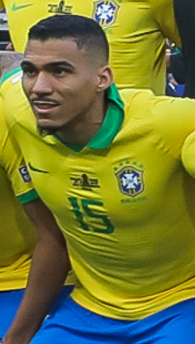
Allan with Brazil at the 2019 Copa América

Although born in Brazil, Allan holds dual Portuguese-Brazilian nationality, making him eligible to play for Brazil or Portugal. Allan also 'has a distant Italian relative' which qualifies him for an Italian passport and thus the Italy national team. Sky Sport Italia and TV Luna report that he has been asked 'to switch allegiances to the Azzurri' by national coach Roberto Mancini. Manager Tite, on 26 October 2018, named Allan to the Brazilian squad that will face Uruguay and Cameroon in friendlies the following month. However, because these were only exhibition matches, Allan still also remained eligible to play for Portugal and Italy at the time. He made his senior international debut in the former match, held in London on 16 November, which ended in a 1–0 victory to Brazil.

In May 2019, Allan was included in Brazil's 23-man squad for the 2019 Copa América on home soil. On 7 July, he come on as an injury-time substitute in Brazil's 3–1 victory over Peru in the final of the tournament, at the Maracanã Stadium.

== Style of play ==
Allan operates primarily as a defensive midfielder or as a central midfielder in the mezzala role, and is equally comfortable at playing both in an attacking and defensive midfield role; he is also capable of being deployed in a deeper role as a playmaker. As such, he has also been labelled a box-to-box midfielder in the media. He is also capable of playing on the left or right flank, and has even been deployed as a full-back on occasion.

Allan is primarily deployed as a holding midfielder in front of the defense. He is known for his physical strength, work rate, ball-winning ability, and energetic playing style. In addition to his defensive qualities, he possesses good technique, dribbling ability, pace, and long-range passing, allowing him to initiate attacking moves after regaining possession. Although primarily a defensive midfielder, he has also been noted for his tactical versatility and ability to carry the ball forward by dribbling past opponents, including occasionally using "nutmegs" to evade defenders.

== Career statistics ==
=== Club ===
As of match played 17 October 2026

Appearances and goals by club, season and competition
Club	Season	League			State league (Note: Includes Campeonato Carioca)		National cup (Note: Includes Coppa Italia, FA Cup, UAE President's Cup, Copa do Brasil)		League cup (Note: Includes EFL Cup, UAE League Cup)		Continental		Other		Total	
Club	Season	Division	Apps	Goals	Apps	Goals	Apps	Goals	Apps	Goals	Apps	Goals	Apps	Goals	Apps	Goals
Vasco da Gama	2009	Série B	13	0	—		—		—		—		—		13	0
Vasco da Gama	2010	Série A	15	0	0	0	0	0	—		—		—		15	0
Vasco da Gama	2011	Série A	19	0	10	0	10	0	—		7 (Note: Appearances in Copa Sudamericana)	1	—		46	1
Vasco da Gama	2012	Série A	4	0	10	1	—		—		5 (Note: Appearances in Copa Libertadores)	0	—		19	1
Vasco da Gama	Total		51	0	20	1	10	0	—		12	1	—		93	1
Udinese	2012–13	Serie A	36	0	—		1	0	—		0	0	—		37	0
Udinese	2013–14	Serie A	33	0	—		4	0	—		4 (Note: Appearances in UEFA Europa League)	0	—		41	0
Udinese	2014–15	Serie A	35	1	—		3	1	—		—		—		38	2
Udinese	Total		104	1	—		8	1	—		4	0	—		116	2
Napoli	2015–16	Serie A	35	3	—		2	0	—		6	0	—		43	3
Napoli	2016–17	Serie A	29	1	—		2	0	—		8 (Note: Appearances in UEFA Champions League)	0	—		39	1
Napoli	2017–18	Serie A	38	4	—		2	0	—		10 (Note: Eight appearances in UEFA Champions League, two appearances in UEFA Europa League)	0	—		50	4
Napoli	2018–19	Serie A	33	1	—		2	0	—		12 (Note: Six appearances in UEFA Champions League, six appearances in UEFA Europa League)	0	—		47	1
Napoli	2019–20	Serie A	23	2	—		4	0	—		6	0	—		33	2
Napoli	Total		158	11	—		12	0	—		42	0	—		212	11
Everton	2020–21	Premier League	24	0	—		1	0	1	0	—		—		26	0
Everton	2021–22	Premier League	28	0	—		3	0	0	0	—		—		31	0
Everton	2022–23	Premier League	0	0	—		—		0	0	—		—		0	0
Everton	Total		52	0	—		4	0	1	0	—		—		57	0
Al Wahda	2022–23	UAE Pro League	22	0	—		1	0	3	0	—		—		26	0
Al Wahda	2023–24	UAE Pro League	23	3	—		1	0	7	0	—		—		31	3
Al Wahda	Total		45	3	—		2	0	10	0	—		—		57	3
Botafogo	2024	Série A	11	0	—		2	0	—		3	0	1 (Note: Appearance in FIFA Intercontinental Cup)	0	17	0
Botafogo	2025	Série A	21	0	2	0	3	0	—		7	0	4 (Note: Three appearances in FIFA Club World Cup, one appearance in Recopa Sudamericana)	0	37	0
Botafogo	2026	Série A	14	0	4	0	1	0	—		3	0	—		22	0
Botafogo	Total		46	0	6	0	6	0	—		13	0	5	0	76	0
Career total			456	15	26	1	42	1	11	0	71	1	5	0	611	18

=== International ===
As of match played 13 November 2020

Appearances and goals by national team and year
National team	Year	Apps	Goals
Brazil	2018	2	0
Brazil	2019	7	0
Brazil	2020	1	0
Total		10	0

== Honours ==
Vasco da Gama

- Copa do Brasil: 2011
- Campeonato Brasileiro Série B: 2009

Napoli

- Coppa Italia: 2019–20

Botafogo

- Copa Libertadores: 2024
- Campeonato Brasileiro Série A: 2024

Brazil U20

- FIFA U-20 World Cup: 2011

Brazil

- Copa América: 2019
