= Maicosuel =

Brazilian footballer (born 1986)

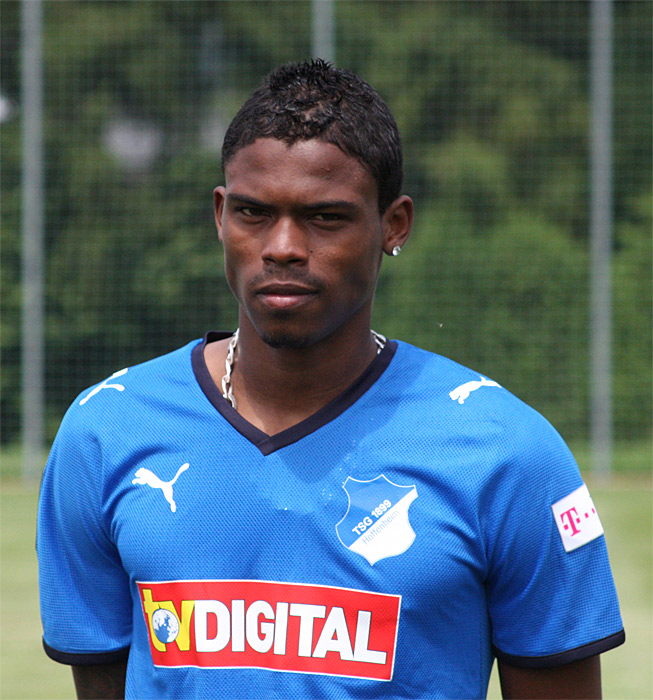
- Maicosuel in 2009

Personal information
- Full name: Maicosuel Reginaldo de Matos
- Date of birth: 16 June 1986 (age 40)
- Place of birth: Cosmópolis, Brazil
- Height: 1.78 m (5 ft 10 in)
- Position: Attacking midfielder

Youth career
- 1998–2001: Guarani
- 2001: Inter-SP

Senior career*
Years	Team	Apps	(Gls)
2001–2005	Atlético Sorocaba	0	(0)
2005–2006	Paraná	45	(4)
2007–2008	Cruzeiro	25	(2)
2008	→ Palmeiras (loan)	14	(1)
2009	→ Botafogo (loan)	18	(8)
2009–2010	1899 Hoffenheim	27	(3)
2010–2012	Botafogo	54	(18)
2012–2014	Udinese	39	(5)
2014–2017	Atlético Mineiro	38	(7)
2015–2016	→ Al Sharjah (loan)	26	(4)
2017–2020	São Paulo	9	(1)
2018	→ Grêmio (loan)	0	(0)
2018–2019	→ Paraná (loan)	0	(0)
- * Club domestic league appearances and goals

Maicosuel Reginaldo de Matos (born 16 June 1986), known simply as Maicosuel, is a Brazilian former professional footballer who played as an attacking midfielder.

== Career ==
Maicosuel was born in Cosmópolis, São Paulo. After very good performances playing for Paraná Clube, he was acquired by Cruzeiro in 2007. Despite great expectations, he never secured a position in the squad and was mostly used as a back-up until June 2008, when he was bought by Traffic Sports, an investor group, and left Cruzeiro to join Palmeiras.

After an unsuccessful spell at Palmeiras Maicosuel joined Botafogo in 2009. At Botafogo Maicosuel played at top level and with only five months at Botafogo he was elected the best player of the Rio de Janeiro State League. On 21 May 2009, TSG 1899 Hoffenheim signed "Mago" (Portuguese for 'Magician') from Botafogo for €4.5 million on a five-year contract. In the summer of 2010 he returned to Botafogo.

On 13 July 2012, Maicosuel signed a five-year deal with Italian club Udinese. He had a promising start as he scored on his Serie A debut against Fiorentina, but soon afterwards his error from the penalty spot against Sporting Braga was decisive as Udinese lost the penalty shootout which would have granted the Italian team access to the group phase of the 2012–13 UEFA Champions League. Maicosuel was the only player to miss his penalty, attempting a Panenka chip that goalkeeper Beto easily caught. Braga would go on to win the shootout 5–4.

On 26 May 2014 Maicosuel returned to Brazil, joining Atlético Mineiro on a five-year deal for a fee of €3.3 million. The player had some good appearances in the second half of 2014, scoring in the Recopa Sudamericana against Lanús and in the Copa do Brasil semifinals against Flamengo, both competitions the club went on to win, but failed to secure a regular place in the team's starting eleven. In 2015, despite some good performances such as a brace against Internacional in early July, Maicosuel still could not make it as a first squad regular. He was eventually loaned to Emirati club Al Sharjah SCC in late July, on a year-long deal worth €1.8 million.

On 29 January 2018, after playing for São Paulo for only seven months, Maicosuel was excluded from the club's plans. Twelve days earlier, he had played his last match for Tricolor. In that match, the team lost 2–0 to São Bento, in the opening round of the 2018 2018 São Paulo State League.

== Career statistics ==
As of 1 December 2014

Appearances and goals by club, season and competition
Club	Season	League			National cup		Continental		Other		Total	
Club	Season	Division	Apps	Goals	Apps	Goals	Apps	Goals	Apps	Goals	Apps	Goals
Paraná	2005	Série A	14	0	—		—		—		14	0
Paraná	2006	Série A	31	4	—		—		—		31	4
Paraná	Total		45	4	0	0	0	0	0	0	45	4
Cruzeiro	2007	Série A	22	1	—		—		—		22	1
Cruzeiro	2008	Série A	3	1	—		—		—		3	1
Cruzeiro	Total		25	1	0	0	0	0	0	0	25	1
Palmeiras (loan)	2008	Série A	14	1	—		6	0	—		20	1
Botafogo (loan)	2009	Série A	—		—		—		19	11	19	11
TSG 1899 Hoffenheim	2009–10	Bundesliga	27	3	4	2	—		—		24	5
Botafogo	2010	Série A	13	2	—		—		—		13	2
Botafogo	2011	Série A	35	4	—		—		—		35	4
Botafogo	2012	Série A	6	0	4	0	—		12	5	22	5
Botafogo	Total		54	6	4	0	0	0	12	5	70	11
Udinese	2012–13	Serie A	20	2	1	0	2	0	—		23	2
Udinese	2013–14	Serie A	19	1	1	1	4	0	—		24	2
Udinese	Total		39	3	2	1	6	0	0	0	47	4
Atlético Mineiro	2014	Série A	15	1	5	1	2	1	—		22	3
Atlético Mineiro	2015	Série A	12	2	—		5	0	—	17	2	
Atlético Mineiro	Total		27	3	5	1	7	1	0	0	39	5
Career total			224	21	15	4	19	1	31	16	289	42

== Honours ==
Paraná Clube

- Campeonato Paranaense: 2006

Cruzeiro

- Campeonato Mineiro: 2008

Atlético Mineiro

- Recopa Sudamericana: 2014
- Copa do Brasil: 2014
- Campeonato Mineiro: 2015, 2017

Grêmio

- Recopa Sudamericana: 2018
