= Andrea Coda =

Italian professional footballer (born 1985)

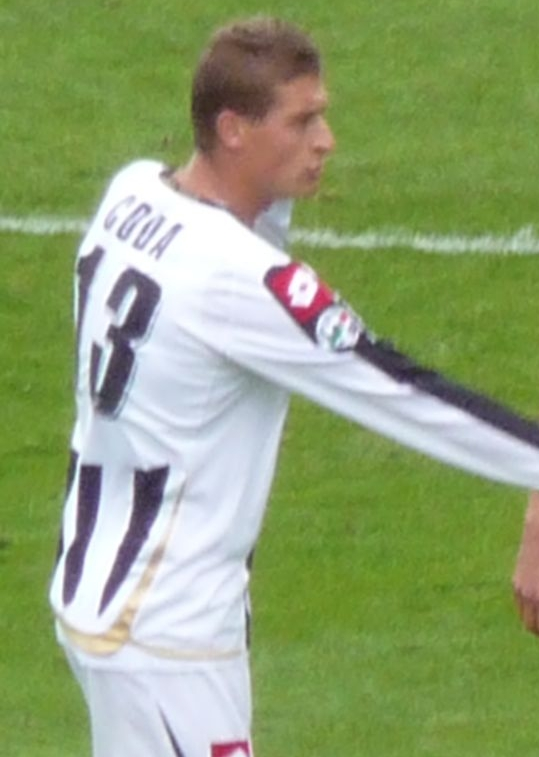

Personal information
- Date of birth: 25 April 1985 (age 41)
- Place of birth: Massa, Italy
- Height: 1.90 m (6 ft 3 in)
- Position: Centre back

Youth career
- Lucchese
- Empoli

Senior career*
Years	Team	Apps	(Gls)
2004–2006	Empoli	76	(1)
2006–2015	Udinese	132	(0)
2013	→ Parma (loan)	8	(0)
2013–2014	→ Livorno (loan)	20	(0)
2015–2016	Sampdoria	6	(0)
2016–2018	Pescara	39	(0)
2019	Viterbese	14	(0)
2019–2020	Gubbio	13	(0)

International career^{‡}
2001	Italy U-16	10	(0)
2001	Italy U-17	2	(0)
2003	Italy U-18	2	(0)
2003–2004	Italy U-19	8	(0)
2004–2005	Italy U-20	12	(1)
2005–2007	Italy U-21	5	(0)
2008	Italy Olympic U-23	8	(0)
- * Club domestic league appearances and goals as of 23 February 2020 ‡ National team caps and goals as of 13 August 2008

Andrea Coda (born 25 April 1985) is an Italian professional footballer who plays as a defender.

== Club career ==
=== Empoli ===
Coda began playing youth football for Lucchese before joining Empoli, located an hour away from his hometown. He made his debut for Empoli when they were in Serie B and helped them gain promotion to Serie A for the 2005–06 season. In August 2005, he made his Serie A debut and became a regular starter.

=== Udinese ===
Udinese bought 50% of his contract in January 2006 for €1 million and he remained at Empoli until the summer. During the 2006–07 season, Coda had to contend with a place on the bench but he eventually earned a place in the starting eleven by the second half of the season. In June 2007, Udinese acquired the remainder of his contract for €1.315 million. By the 2008–09 season, he became first choice, often partnering Maurizio Domizzi, and made his European debut in September 2008 in the UEFA Cup. In March 2010, he was ruled out for the rest of the season after injuring his knee just barely five minutes into the match against Chievo Verona and had to be substituted.

In June 2010, Udinese agreed a double loan deal with Bari, subject to Coda and Jaime Romero's decision. Eventually Coda remained in Udine.

On 21 June 2012, Coda signed a new five-year contract after the club qualified for the UEFA Champions League playoffs round for a second successive season.

=== Sampdoria ===
On 22 January 2015, fellow Serie A club U.C. Sampdoria signed Coda and Luis Muriel in temporary deals, with an obligation to buy them outright for €12 million total fee. Coda signed a contract lasting until 30 June 2017.

=== Pescara ===
On 1 February 2016, Coda joined Pescara on loan for the rest of the season, with an option to purchase.

=== Viterbese Castrense ===
On 30 January 2019, he signed with Viterbese Castrense in Serie C.

=== Gubbio ===
On 9 November 2019 he joined Serie C club Gubbio until the end of the 2019–20 season.

== International career ==
Coda played for Italy national team at every youth level, from the under-16 (was renamed from under-15 after 2000–01 season), to the Olympic team in Beijing. He also participated in 2004 UEFA European Under-19 Championship, 2005 FIFA World Youth Championship, 2006 UEFA European Under-21 Championship and 2007 UEFA European Under-21 Championship.

In order to prepare for the Olympics, he also played the match against Dutch Olympic team in February 2008, as well as in 2008 Toulon Tournament.
