= Thomas Heurtaux =

French football defender (born 1988)

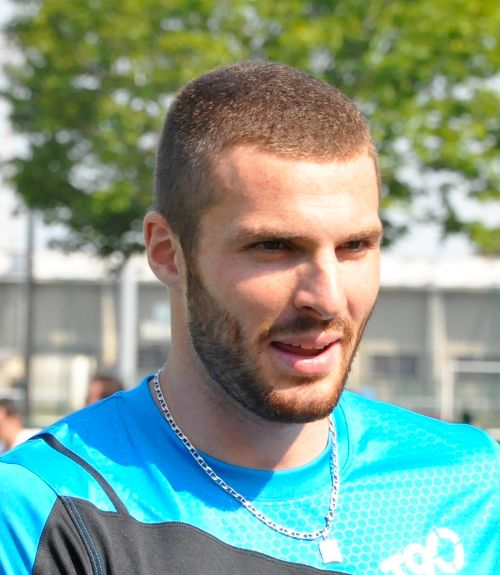

Personal information
- Full name: Thomas Marc Patrice Heurtaux
- Date of birth: 3 July 1988 (age 38)
- Place of birth: Lisieux, France
- Height: 1.83 m (6 ft 0 in)
- Position: Defender

Senior career*
Years	Team	Apps	(Gls)
2007–2009	Caen B	2	(0)
2008–2009	→ Cherbourg (loan)	25	(1)
2009–2012	Caen	97	(5)
2012–2018	Udinese	102	(4)
2017–2018	→ Hellas Verona (loan)	17	(0)
2018–2019	Ankaragücü	4	(0)
2019–2020	Salernitana	6	(0)
2021	Pohronie	16	(0)
- * Club domestic league appearances and goals as of 26 May 2021

Thomas Heurtaux (French pronunciation: [tɔmɑ œʁto]; born 3 July 1988) is a retired French professional footballer who last played for Pohronie in the Fortuna Liga.

He previously played domestically for Caen and Cherbourg, for Italian clubs Udinese and Hellas Verona, and for Ankaragücü of the Turkish Süper Lig.

== Club career ==
=== Caen ===
The Normandy native came through the ranks at Caen, and spent his entire career with the club, apart from a loan spell at Cherbourg in 2008–09, when he scored two goals in 25 appearances.

Heurtaux represented the club 65 times, scoring five goals in the process, to establish himself in the Caen first team.

=== Udinese ===
On 25 May 2012, Udinese confirmed the signing of Heurtaux from Caen on a two-year deal.

==== Loan to Hellas Verona ====
On 12 July 2017, he agreed to join Hellas Verona for a year loan.

=== Ankaragücü ===
On 18 August 2018, he joined Turkish club Ankaragücü on a permanent transfer. A year later, having claimed that the club had not paid his wages for nine months, Heurtaux cancelled his contract.

=== Salernitana ===
He returned to Italian football with Serie B club Salernitana on 2 September 2019.

=== Pohronie ===
In the winter of 2021, Heurtaux signed with Pohronie for half-season, with an aim to save the team from relegation in the Fortuna Liga. The club remained in the top division and Heurtaux appeared in 16 games.
