= Gabriel Silva (footballer, born 1991) =

Brazilian footballer

Personal information
- Full name: Gabriel Moisés Antunes da Silva
- Date of birth: 13 May 1991 (age 35)
- Place of birth: Piracicaba, Brazil
- Height: 1.79 m (5 ft 10 in)
- Position: Left-back

Youth career
- 2007–2008: Rio Claro
- 2008–2010: Palmeiras

Senior career*
Years	Team	Apps	(Gls)
2009–2012	Palmeiras	36	(2)
2012–2017	Udinese	65	(2)
2012	→ Novara (loan)	3	(0)
2012	→ Granada (loan)	0	(0)
2015–2016	→ Carpi (loan)	16	(0)
2016	→ Genoa (loan)	11	(0)
2016–2017	→ Granada (loan)	12	(0)
2017–2023	Saint-Étienne	71	(1)
2020–2021	Saint-Étienne B	2	(0)

International career^{‡}
2011	Brazil U20	9	(1)
- * Club domestic league appearances and goals as of 16 January 2023 ‡ National team caps and goals as of 22 August 2011 (UTC)

Gabriel Moisés Antunes da Silva (born 13 May 1991), known as Gabriel Silva (Brazilian Portuguese: [ɡabɾiˈew ˈsiwvɐ]), is a Brazilian professional footballer who plays as a left-back.

== Club career ==
=== Palmeiras ===
Gabriel Silva made his debut for Palmeiras by starting a Campeonato Paulista 2010 match against Monte Azul on 27 January 2010.

Gabriel's first match in the Série A came in a 1–0 loss to rivals São Paulo on 26 May 2010, and his first goal as a professional footballer, was against Avaí, on 18 July 2010. His second professional goal was also scored against Avaí, on 7 October 2010.

=== Udinese ===
In a complicated transfer, Gabriel Silva signed for Udinese, who, however, were unable to register any more non-EU players according to Serie A rules. He was player was subsequently registered with Udinese's Spanish feeder club Granada and then immediately loaned to Novara for the remainder of the 2011–12 season.

After subsequent loans at Carpi and Genoa in the 2015–16 season, Gabriel Silva returned to Granada again in a loan deal.

=== Saint-Étienne ===
Gabriel Silva signed for French Ligue 1 side Saint-Étienne on 9 August 2017. He made his debut as an 86th minute substitution against Caen. He scored his first goal for the club in 2–2 draw with Rennes before getting sent off late on in the same game. Silva's contract with Saint-Étienne was terminated by mutual agreement on 27 January 2023.

== Honours ==
Saint-Étienne

- Coupe de France runner-up: 2019–20

Brazil U20

- South American Youth Championship: 2011
- FIFA U-20 World Cup: 2011
