= 2018–19 Hellas Verona FC season =

Hellas Verona
2019–20 season
- President: Maurizio Setti
- Manager: Fabio Grosso (until 1 May 2019); Alfredo Aglietti (from 2 May)
- Stadium: Stadio Marc'Antonio Bentegodi
- Serie B: 5th (play-offs winner)
- Coppa Italia: Third round
- Top goalscorer: League: Giampaolo Pazzini (12); All: Giampaolo Pazzini (15)
Home colours	Away colours

The 2018–19 season was Hellas Verona Football Club's first season back in Serie B after being relegated to the second division at the end of the 2017–18 Serie A season. The club finished 5th in the 2018–19 Serie B season and were promoted back to the Serie A via winning the play-offs.

== Season summary ==
On 21 June 2018, Fabio Grosso was appointed manager of Hellas, signing a two-year deal at the newly relegated Serie B club. Grosso was sacked on 1 May 2019 after a shock 3–2 home loss to relegation-threatened Livorno. He was replaced the next day by Alfredo Aglietti, with the goal to help the club getting into the promotion playoffs. Under Aglietti's short tenure, he managed to guide the club to fifth place in the regular season, and then to the promotion playoff finals, where Verona defeated Cittadella to achieve promotion to Serie A after only a single season in the second division. Despite his successes, however, Aglietti was not confirmed for another season, and Ivan Jurić was named as his replacement in charge of the club a few days later.

== Squad ==
=== First team squad ===
As of 31 January 2019

Note: Flags indicate national team as defined under FIFA eligibility rules; some limited exceptions apply. Players may hold more than one non-FIFA nationality.

No.	Pos.	Nation	Player
1	GK	(Italy) ITA	Marco Silvestri
2	MF	(Italy) ITA	Gianni Munari (on loan from Parma)
3	DF	(Italy) ITA	Luigi Vitale
4	MF	(Scotland) SCO	Liam Henderson
5	DF	(Italy) ITA	Davide Faraoni (on loan from Crotone)
6	MF	(Italy) ITA	Luca Marrone (on loan from Juventus)
7	FW	(Brazil) BRA	Ryder Matos (on loan from Udinese)
8	MF	(Sweden) SWE	Samuel Gustafson (on loan from Torino)
9	MF	(Italy) ITA	Antonino Ragusa (on loan from Sassuolo)
10	FW	(Italy) ITA	Samuel Di Carmine (on loan from Perugia)
11	FW	(Italy) ITA	Giampaolo Pazzini (Captain)
12	GK	(Italy) ITA	Lorenzo Ferrari
13	FW	(Ivory Coast) CIV	Abdoullaye Traoré
14	MF	(Argentina) ARG	Santiago Colombatto (on loan from Cagliari)
15	DF	(Slovenia) SVN	Jure Balkovec

No.	Pos.	Nation	Player
16	FW	(South Korea) KOR	Lee Seung-woo
17	DF	(Italy) ITA	Alessandro Crescenzi
20	MF	(Italy) ITA	Mattia Zaccagni
21	MF	(Tunisia) TUN	Karim Laribi
22	GK	(Italy) ITA	Andrea Tozzo (on loan from Sampdoria)
23	FW	(Italy) ITA	Antonio Di Gaudio (on loan from Parma)
24	DF	(Albania) ALB	Marash Kumbulla
25	MF	(Italy) ITA	Andrea Danzi
26	GK	(Italy) ITA	Alessandro Berardi
27	DF	(Poland) POL	Paweł Dawidowicz
28	FW	(Slovakia) SVK	Ľubomír Tupta
29	DF	(Italy) ITA	Alberto Almici (on loan from Atalanta)
30	DF	(Italy) ITA	Matteo Bianchetti
33	DF	(Brazil) BRA	Alan Empereur

=== On loan ===
Note: Flags indicate national team as defined under FIFA eligibility rules; some limited exceptions apply. Players may hold more than one non-FIFA nationality.

No.	Pos.	Nation	Player
—	GK	(Italy) ITA	Nicola Borghetto (at Mantova until 30 June 2019)
—	GK	(Brazil) BRA	Nícolas (at Udinese until 30 June 2019)
—	GK	(Italy) ITA	Riccardo Tosi (at Arzignano Valchiampo until 30 June 2019)
—	DF	(Italy) ITA	Andrea Badan (at Alessandria until 30 June 2019)
—	DF	(Italy) ITA	Gianmaria Bagarolo (at Clodiense until 30 June 2019)
—	DF	(Romania) ROU	Deian Boldor (at Foggia until 30 June 2019)
—	DF	(Italy) ITA	Antonio Caracciolo (at Cremonese until 30 June 2019)
—	DF	(Italy) ITA	Nicolò Casale (at Südtirol until 30 June 2019)
—	DF	(Italy) ITA	Matteo Franchetti (at Virtus Verona until 30 June 2019)
—	DF	(Italy) ITA	Jody Maistrello (at Mantova until 30 June 2019)
—	DF	(Italy) ITA	Edoardo Pavan (at Virtus Verona until 30 June 2019)
—	DF	(Italy) ITA	Riccardo Perazzolo (at Torino U-19 until 30 June 2019)
—	MF	(Italy) ITA	Daniel Bessa (at Genoa until 30 June 2019)
—	MF	(Italy) ITA	Simone Calvano (at Padova until 30 June 2019)

No.	Pos.	Nation	Player
—	MF	(Italy) ITA	Luca Checchin (at Alessandria until 30 June 2019)
—	MF	(Italy) ITA	Alessandro Cherubin (at Mantova until 30 June 2019)
—	MF	(Italy) ITA	Lorenzo Dentale (at Arzignano Valchiampo until 30 June 2019)
—	MF	(Algeria) ALG	Mohamed Fares (at SPAL until 30 June 2019)
—	MF	(Italy) ITA	Gaetano Navas (at Paganese until 30 June 2019)
—	MF	(Italy) ITA	Matteo Pinton (at Virtus Verona until 30 June 2019)
—	MF	(Slovakia) SVK	Šimon Štefanec (at Nitra until 30 June 2020)
—	MF	(Italy) ITA	Michele Valente (at Ambrosiana until 30 June 2019)
—	MF	(Italy) ITA	Mattia Valoti (at SPAL until 30 June 2019)
—	FW	(Italy) ITA	Enrico Bearzotti (at Monza until 30 June 2019)
—	FW	(Italy) ITA	Pierluigi Cappelluzzo (at Imolese until 30 June 2019)
—	FW	(Guinea) GUI	Karamoko Cissé (at Carpi until 30 June 2019)
—	FW	(Ghana) GHA	Joseph Ekuban (at Mantova until 30 June 2019)

== Competitions ==
=== Serie B ===
==== League table ====
Pos	Team	Pld	W	D	L	GF	GA	GD	Pts	Promotion, qualification or relegation
3	Benevento	36	17	9	10	61	45	+16	60	Qualification to promotion play-offs semi-finals
4	Pescara	36	14	13	9	50	46	+4	55	Qualification to promotion play-offs semi-finals
5	Hellas Verona (O, P)	36	13	13	10	49	46	+3	52	Qualification to promotion play-offs preliminary round
6	Spezia	36	14	9	13	53	46	+7	51 (Note: Spezia finished ahead of Cittadella on head-to-head points: Spezia 1–0 Cittadella, Cittadella 0–1 Spezia.)	Qualification to promotion play-offs preliminary round
7	Cittadella	36	12	15	9	49	38	+11	51	Qualification to promotion play-offs preliminary round

Source: Lega Serie B
Rules for classification: 1) Points; 2) Head-to-head points; 3) Head-to-head goal difference; 4) Goal difference; 5) Goals scored; 6) Draw.
(O) Play-off winners; (P) Promoted

==== Play-offs ====
===== Preliminary round =====
18 May 2019	Hellas Verona	4–1 (a.e.t.)	Perugia	Verona
21:00 CEST (UTC+2)	Faraoni (yellow card) 16'; Empereur (yellow card) 27' (goal) 101'; Di Carmine 41'; Laribi (yellow card) 99'; Pazzini 118', 120+1'	Report	(yellow card) 11' Dragomir; (yellow card) 34' (yellow-red card) 64' Kouan; 89' (pen.) Vido; (yellow card) 104' Verre; (yellow card) 108' Rosi	Stadium: Stadio Marc'Antonio Bentegodi; Attendance: 10,234; Referee: Ivano Pezzuto

===== Semi-final =====
22 May 2019	Hellas Verona	0–0	Pescara	Verona
21:00 CEST (UTC+2)	Danzi (yellow card) 90'	Report	(yellow card) 14' Pinto; (yellow card) 90+3' Bruno	Stadium: Stadio Marc'Antonio Bentegodi; Attendance: 11,308; Referee: Livio Marinelli

26 May 2019	Pescara	0–1 (0–1 agg.)	Hellas Verona	Pescara
21:00 CEST (UTC+2)	Perrotta (yellow card) 71'; Scognamiglio (yellow card) 73' (yellow-red card) 90+2'; Del Grosso (yellow card) 84'	Report	(yellow card) 27' Colombatto; (yellow card) 55' Henderson; 74' (pen.) (yellow card) 90+4' Di Carmine	Stadium: Stadio Adriatico; Attendance: 11,165; Referee: Eugenio Abbattista

===== Final =====
30 May 2019	Cittadella	2–0	Hellas Verona	Cittadella
21:00 CEST (UTC+2)	Diaw 6', 80'	Report	(yellow card) 63' Vitale; (yellow card) 67' Colombatto	Stadium: Stadio Pier Cesare Tombolato; Attendance: 7,623; Referee: Antonio Giua

2 June 2019	Hellas Verona	3–0 (3–2 agg.)	Cittadella	Verona
21:15 CEST (UTC+2)	Vitale (yellow card) 9'; Di Carmine (yellow card) 12'; Zaccagni 27'; Bianchetti (yellow card) 48'; Di Carmine 69'; Laribi 83'; Munari (yellow card) 90+2'	Report	(yellow card) 10' Siega; (yellow card) 24' (yellow-red card) 62' Parodi; (yellow card) 60' (yellow-red card) 78' Proia	Stadium: Stadio Marc'Antonio Bentegodi; Attendance: 25,248; Referee: Marco Piccinini

=== Coppa Italia ===
==== Second round ====
5 August 2018	Hellas Verona (2)	4–1	Juve Stabia (3)	Verona
				Stadium: Stadio Marcantonio Bentegodi

==== Third round ====
12 August 2018	Catania (3)	2–0	Hellas Verona (2)	Catania
				Stadium: Stadio Angelo Massimino
