= 2017–18 Hellas Verona FC season =

Hellas Verona
2017–18 season
- President: Maurizio Setti
- Manager: Fabio Pecchia
- Stadium: Stadio Marc'Antonio Bentegodi
- Serie A: 19th
- Coppa Italia: Round of 16
- Top goalscorer: League: Moise Kean, Giampaolo Pazzini (4); All: Moise Kean, Giampaolo Pazzini, Daniele Verde (4)
- Highest home attendance: 29,215 vs Juventus (30 December 2017, Serie A)
- Lowest home attendance: 7,771 vs Avellino (13 August 2017, Coppa Italia)
- Average home league attendance: 17,333
| Home colours | Away colours | Third colours |

The 2017–18 season was Hellas Verona Football Club's first season back in Serie A following the club's relegation to Serie B at the end of the 2015–16 season. Verona earned promotion back to the top-flight after finishing second in the 2016–17 Serie B. The club finished 19th and made an immediate return to the second division.

== Players ==
=== Squad information ===
As of 8 January 2018

Note: Flags indicate national team as defined under FIFA eligibility rules; some limited exceptions apply. Players may hold more than one non-FIFA nationality.

| No. | Pos. | Nation | Player |
|---|---|---|---|
| 1 | GK | BRA | Nícolas |
| 2 | MF | ITA | Rômulo |
| 3 | DF | ITA | Nicolò Cherubin |
| 4 | MF | ITA | Simon Laner |
| 5 | MF | ARG | Bruno Zuculini |
| 7 | FW | ITA | Daniele Verde (on loan from Roma) |
| 8 | MF | ITA | Marco Fossati |
| 10 | FW | ITA | Alessio Cerci |
| 11 | FW | ITA | Giampaolo Pazzini (captain) |
| 12 | DF | ITA | Antonio Caracciolo |
| 14 | MF | ARG | Franco Zuculini |
| 17 | GK | ITA | Marco Silvestri |
| 20 | MF | ITA | Mattia Zaccagni |

| No. | Pos. | Nation | Player |
|---|---|---|---|
| 21 | FW | KOR | Lee Seung-woo |
| 22 | DF | ITA | Matteo Bianchetti |
| 23 | DF | ITA | Riccardo Brosco |
| 24 | MF | ITA | Daniel Bessa |
| 27 | MF | ITA | Mattia Valoti |
| 28 | DF | ITA | Alex Ferrari |
| 37 | FW | ITA | Enrico Bearzotti |
| 40 | GK | ITA | Ferdinando Coppola |
| 69 | DF | FRA | Samuel Souprayen |
| 75 | DF | FRA | Thomas Heurtaux (on loan from Udinese) |
| 77 | MF | LIE | Marcel Büchel (on loan from Empoli) |
| 93 | FW | ALG | Mohamed Fares |
| 97 | DF | ITA | Gian Filippo Felicioli (on loan from Milan) |

== Transfers ==
=== In ===
| Date | Pos. | Player | Age | Moving from | Fee | Notes | Source |
|---|---|---|---|---|---|---|---|
| 1 July 2017 | MF | (Italy) Federico Viviani | 25 | (Italy) Bologna | Loan return | | |
| 10 July 2017 | FW | (Italy) Alessio Cerci | 29 | Unattached | Free | | |
| 10 July 2017 | FW | (Italy) Antonio Cassano | 34 | Unattached | Free | | |
| 4 August 2017 | DF | (Uruguay) Martín Cáceres | 30 | (England) Southampton | | One year contract | |

==== Loans in ====
| Date | Pos. | Player | Age | Moving from | Fee | Notes | Source |
|---|---|---|---|---|---|---|---|
| 7 July 2017 | FW | (Italy) Daniele Verde | 21 | (Italy) Roma | Loan | Loan with an option to buy | |
| 11 January 2018 | FW | (Brazil) Ryder Matos | 24 | (Italy) Udinese | Loan | | |
| 11 January 2018 | FW | (Croatia) Bruno Petković | 23 | (Italy) Bologna | Loan | | |
| 19 January 2018 | DF | (Romania) Deian Boldor | 22 | (Italy) Bologna | Loan | | |

=== Out ===
| Date | Pos. | Player | Age | Moving to | Fee | Notes | Source |
|---|---|---|---|---|---|---|---|
| 24 July 2017 | FW | (Italy) Antonio Cassano | 35 | — | | Retired | |
| 8 January 2018 | DF | (Uruguay) Martín Cáceres | 30 | (Italy) Lazio | | | |

==== Loans out ====
| Date | Pos. | Player | Age | Moving to | Fee | Notes | Source |
|---|---|---|---|---|---|---|---|
| 7 July 2017 | MF | (Italy) Federico Viviani | 25 | (Italy) SPAL | Loan | Loan with an option to buy | |

== Pre-season and friendlies ==
| v |

== Competitions ==
=== Serie A ===
==== League table ====
| Pos | Team | Pld | W | D | L | GF | GA | GD | Pts | Qualification or relegation |
|---|---|---|---|---|---|---|---|---|---|---|
| 16 | Cagliari | 38 | 11 | 6 | 21 | 33 | 61 | −28 | 39 | |
| 17 | SPAL | 38 | 8 | 14 | 16 | 39 | 59 | −20 | 38 | |
| 18 | Crotone (R) | 38 | 9 | 8 | 21 | 40 | 66 | −26 | 35 | Relegation to Serie B |
| 19 | Hellas Verona (R) | 38 | 7 | 4 | 27 | 30 | 78 | −48 | 25 | Relegation to Serie B |
| 20 | Benevento (R) | 38 | 6 | 3 | 29 | 33 | 84 | −51 | 21 | Relegation to Serie B |

Source: Serie A, Soccerway
Rules for classification: 1) Points; 2) Head-to-head points; 3) Head-to-head goal difference; 4) Goal difference; 5) Goals scored; 6) Draw.
(R) Relegated

==== Results summary ====
| Overall | | | | | | | | Home | | | | | | Away | | | | | |
| Pld | W | D | L | GF | GA | GD | Pts | W | D | L | GF | GA | GD | W | D | L | GF | GA | GD |
|---|---|---|---|---|---|---|---|---|---|---|---|---|---|---|---|---|---|---|---|
| 38 | 7 | 4 | 27 | 30 | 78 | −48 | 25 | 5 | 1 | 13 | 14 | 35 | −21 | 2 | 3 | 14 | 16 | 43 | −27 |

Last updated: 19 May 2018.
Source: Competitive matches

==== Results by round ====
| Round | 1 | 2 | 3 | 4 | 5 | 6 | 7 | 8 | 9 | 10 | 11 | 12 | 13 | 14 | 15 | 16 | 17 | 18 | 19 | 20 | 21 | 22 | 23 | 24 | 25 | 26 | 27 | 28 | 29 | 30 | 31 | 32 | 33 | 34 | 35 | 36 | 37 | 38 |
|---|---|---|---|---|---|---|---|---|---|---|---|---|---|---|---|---|---|---|---|---|---|---|---|---|---|---|---|---|---|---|---|---|---|---|---|---|---|---|
| Ground | H | A | H | A | H | H | A | H | A | A | H | A | H | A | H | A | H | A | H | A | H | A | H | A | A | H | A | H | H | A | H | A | H | A | H | A | H | A |
| Result | L | D | L | L | D | L | D | W | L | L | L | L | L | W | L | D | W | L | L | L | L | W | L | L | L | W | L | W | L | L | W | L | L | L | L | L | L | L |
| Position | 17 | 13 | 19 | 19 | 18 | 19 | 18 | 16 | 18 | 18 | 19 | 19 | 19 | 19 | 19 | 19 | 19 | 19 | 19 | 19 | 19 | 19 | 19 | 19 | 19 | 19 | 19 | 19 | 19 | 19 | 19 | 19 | 19 | 19 | 19 | 19 | 19 | 19 |

Updated to match(es) played on 19 May 2018. Source: Competitive matches
A = Away; H = Home; W = Win; D = Draw; L = Loss

==== Matches ====
| 19 August 2017 1 | Hellas Verona | 1–3 | Napoli | Verona |
| 20:45 CEST (UTC+02:00) | Heurtaux (yellow card) 74'; Pazzini 83' (pen.); Rômulo (yellow card) 90+1' | Report | Souprayen 32' (o.g.); Milik 39'; Hysaj (yellow card) 52' (red card) 82'; Ghoulam 62'; Giaccherini (yellow card) 90+2' | Stadium: Stadio Marc'Antonio Bentegodi; Attendance: 15,215; Referee: Michael Fabbri |

| 27 August 2017 2 | Crotone | 0–0 | Hellas Verona | Crotone |
| 20:45 CEST (UTC+02:00) | Stoian (yellow card) 38' | Report | Büchel (yellow card) 36'; Fares (yellow card) 52'; Bessa (yellow card) 90+3'; Zaccagni (yellow card) 90+3' | Stadium: Stadio Ezio Scida; Attendance: 9,158; Referee: Marco Guida |

| 10 September 2017 3 | Hellas Verona | 0–5 | Fiorentina | Verona |
| 15:00 CEST (UTC+02:00) | B. Zuculini (yellow card) 34'; Valoti (yellow card) 87' | Report | Simeone 2', (yellow card) 41'; Théréau 10' (pen.); Astori 24'; Veretout 62'; Dias 89' | Stadium: Stadio Marc'Antonio Bentegodi; Attendance: 18,181; Referee: Antonio Damato |

| 16 September 2017 4 | Roma | 3–0 | Hellas Verona | Rome |
| 20:45 CEST (UTC+02:00) | Nainggolan 22'; Džeko 33', 61'; De Rossi (yellow card) 73' | Report | Souprayen (yellow card) 45+1' (yellow-red card) 66'; Valoti (yellow card) 53' | Stadium: Stadio Olimpico; Attendance: 29,045; Referee: Luca Pairetto |

| 20 September 2017 5 | Hellas Verona | 0–0 | Sampdoria | Verona |
| 20:45 CEST (UTC+02:00) | B. Zuculini (yellow card) 32'; Valoti (yellow card) 75'; Kean (yellow card) 90+5' | Report | Caprari (yellow card) 20' | Stadium: Stadio Marc'Antonio Bentegodi; Attendance: 14,690; Referee: Gianluca Manganiello |

| 24 September 2017 6 | Hellas Verona | 0–3 | Lazio | Verona |
| 15:00 CEST (UTC+02:00) | Kean (yellow card) 51'; Fossati (yellow card) 80' | Report | Parolo (yellow card) 15'; Immobile 24' (pen.), 40'; Marušić 60', (yellow card) 74' | Stadium: Stadio Marc'Antonio Bentegodi; Attendance: 16,316; Referee: Massimiliano Irrati |

| 1 October 2017 7 | Torino | 2–2 | Hellas Verona | Turin |
| 15:00 CEST (UTC+02:00) | Falque 31'; Niang 44'; Rincón (yellow card) 90+4' | Report | Kean (yellow card) 51', (goal) 89'; B. Zuculini (yellow card) 79' (yellow-red card) 90+7'; Pazzini 90+2' (pen.); Valoti (yellow card) 90+5' | Stadium: Stadio Olimpico Grande Torino; Attendance: 16,834; Referee: Claudio Gavillucci |

| 16 October 2017 8 | Hellas Verona | 1–0 | Benevento | Verona |
| 20:45 CEST (UTC+02:00) | Bessa (yellow card) 27'; Fossati (yellow card) 43'; Rômulo 74', (yellow card) 86'; Kean (yellow card) 77' | Report | Venuti (yellow card) 32'; Antei (red card) 37'; Chibsah (yellow card) 58'; Brignoli (yellow card) 73' | Stadium: Stadio Marc'Antonio Bentegodi; Attendance: 16,282; Referee: Marco Di Bello |

| 22 October 2017 9 | Chievo | 3–2 | Hellas Verona | Verona |
| 12:30 CEST (UTC+02:00) | Inglese 23', 30' (pen.); Hetemaj (yellow card) 49'; Gamberini (yellow card) 54'; Pellissier 73' | Report | Verde 6'; B. Zuculini (yellow card) 22' (yellow-red card) 40'; Bessa (yellow card) 49'; Pazzini 55' (pen.) | Stadium: Stadio Marc'Antonio Bentegodi; Attendance: 15,000; Referee: Rosario Abisso |

| 25 October 2017 10 | Atalanta | 3–0 | Hellas Verona | Bergamo |
| 18:30 CEST (UTC+02:00) | Freuler 50'; Iličić 59'; Kurtić 75' | Report | | Stadium: Stadio Atleti Azzurri d'Italia; Attendance: 16,768; Referee: Livio Marinelli |

| 30 October 2017 11 | Hellas Verona | 1–2 | Internazionale | Verona |
| 20:45 CET (UTC+01:00) | Fares (yellow card) 38'; Pazzini 59' (pen.), (yellow card) 89'; Heurtaux (yellow card) 90+4'; Lee (yellow card) 90+5' | Report | Valero 36'; Gagliardini (yellow card) 51'; Perišić 67'; Brozović (yellow card) 90+2' | Stadium: Stadio Marc'Antonio Bentegodi; Attendance: 26,948; Referee: Claudio Gavillucci |

| 5 November 2017 12 | Cagliari | 2–1 | Hellas Verona | Cagliari |
| 15:00 CET (UTC+01:00) | Ceppitelli 28'; Rafael (yellow card) 45+1'; Faragò 85'; Cigarini (yellow card) 87' | Report | B. Zuculini 6', (yellow card) 48'; Caracciolo (yellow card) 11'; Fares (yellow card) 74'; Valoti (yellow card) 79' | Stadium: Sardegna Arena; Attendance: 13,213; Referee: Marco Guida |

| 20 November 2017 13 | Hellas Verona | 2–3 | Bologna | Verona |
| 20:45 CET (UTC+01:00) | Büchel (yellow card) 8'; Cerci 12'; Cáceres 33'; Fares (yellow card) 59' | Report | González (yellow card) 6'; Destro 21'; Okwonkwo 74'; Donsah 76' | Stadium: Stadio Marc'Antonio Bentegodi; Attendance: 14,938; Referee: Maurizio Mariani |

| 25 November 2017 14 | Sassuolo | 0–2 | Hellas Verona | Reggio Emilia |
| 18:00 CET (UTC+01:00) | | Report | Heurtaux (yellow card) 11' (yellow-red card) 67'; B. Zuculini 22'; Verde 31'; Fares (yellow card) 80' | Stadium: Mapei Stadium – Città del Tricolore; Attendance: 8,774; Referee: Paolo Valeri |

| 4 December 2017 15 | Hellas Verona | 0–1 | Genoa | Verona |
| 21:00 CET (UTC+01:00) | Souprayen (yellow card) 64'; Büchel (yellow card) 87' | Report | Pandev 45+2'; Omeonga (yellow card) 73'; Spolli (yellow card) 77'; Bertolacci (yellow card) 79'; Lapadula (yellow card) 81' | Stadium: Stadio Marc'Antonio Bentegodi; Attendance: 14,136; Referee: Antonio Damato |

| 10 December 2017 16 | SPAL | 2–2 | Hellas Verona | Ferrara |
| 15:00 CET (UTC+01:00) | Viviani (yellow card) 13'; Borriello (yellow card) 53'; Salamon (yellow card) 82'; Paloschi 86'; Antenucci 88' (pen.) | Report | Büchel (yellow card) 22'; Cerci 55' (pen.); Cáceres 69', (yellow card) 90+2' | Stadium: Stadio Paolo Mazza; Attendance: 10,851; Referee: Gianluca Rocchi |

| 17 December 2017 17 | Hellas Verona | 3–0 | Milan | Verona |
| 12:30 CET (UTC+01:00) | Caracciolo 24'; B. Zuculini (yellow card) 35'; Kean 55'; Büchel (yellow card) 59'; Nícolas (yellow card) 65'; Bessa 77' | Report | Borini (yellow card) 45+3'; Romagnoli (yellow card) 49'; Suso (red card) 90+1' | Stadium: Stadio Marc'Antonio Bentegodi; Attendance: 19,439; Referee: Daniele Orsato |

| 23 December 2017 18 | Udinese | 4–0 | Hellas Verona | Udine |
| 15:00 CET (UTC+01:00) | Barák 27', 68'; Widmer 44'; Lasagna 80' | Report | Bessa (yellow card) 24'; Ferrari (yellow card) 48'; Caracciolo (yellow card) 64' | Stadium: Dacia Arena; Attendance: 17,291; Referee: Fabio Maresca |

| 30 December 2017 19 | Hellas Verona | 1–3 | Juventus | Verona |
| 20:45 CET (UTC+01:00) | Cáceres (yellow card) 41', (goal) 59'; Rômulo (yellow card) 85' | Report | Matuidi 6'; Dybala 72', 77' | Stadium: Stadio Marc'Antonio Bentegodi; Attendance: 29,215; Referee: Paolo Mazzoleni |

| 6 January 2018 20 | Napoli | 2–0 | Hellas Verona | Naples |
| 15:00 CET (UTC+01:00) | Koulibaly 65'; Callejón 78' | Report | Bessa (yellow card) 34'; Rômulo (yellow card) 47'; Cáceres (yellow card) 67'; Ferrari (yellow card) 83' | Stadium: Stadio San Paolo; Attendance: 39,580; Referee: Rosario Abisso |

| 21 January 2018 21 | Hellas Verona | 0–3 | Crotone | Verona |
| 15:00 CET (UTC+01:00) | Fares (yellow card) 32'; B. Zuculini (red card) 61' | Report | Barberis 3'; Ricci (yellow card) 17', (goal) 67'; Ceccherini (yellow card) 27'; Martella (yellow card) 28'; Stoian (yellow card) 50', (goal) 54'; Capuano (yellow card) 82' | Stadium: Stadio Marc'Antonio Bentegodi; Attendance: 16,075; Referee: Gianluca Rocchi |

| 28 January 2018 22 | Fiorentina | 1–4 | Hellas Verona | Florence |
| 15:00 CET (UTC+01:00) | Benassi (yellow card) 35'; Dias 53'; Pezzella (yellow card) 66'; Biraghi (yellow card) 82' | Report | Vuković 11'; Kean 20', 46', (yellow card) 45+2'; Caracciolo (yellow card) 35'; Valoti (yellow card) 48'; Fares (yellow card) 49'; Ferrari 55' | Stadium: Stadio Artemio Franchi; Attendance: 22,796; Referee: Claudio Gavillucci |

| 4 February 2018 23 | Hellas Verona | 0–1 | Roma | Verona |
| 12:30 CET (UTC+01:00) | Caracciolo (yellow card) 21'; Fares (yellow card) 29'; Büchel (yellow card) 48' | Report | Ünder 1'; Nainggolan (yellow card) 24'; Pellegrini (red card) 51' | Stadium: Stadio Marc'Antonio Bentegodi; Attendance: 17,495; Referee: Michael Fabbri |

| 11 February 2018 24 | Sampdoria | 2–0 | Hellas Verona | Genoa |
| 15:00 CET (UTC+01:00) | Bereszyński (yellow card) 20'; Barreto 50'; Quagliarella 85' (pen.) | Report | Fares (yellow card) 58' | Stadium: Stadio Luigi Ferraris; Attendance: 18,000; Referee: Luca Pairetto |

| 19 February 2018 25 | Lazio | 2–0 | Hellas Verona | Rome |
| 20:45 CET (UTC+01:00) | Immobile 55', 60' | Report | Nícolas (yellow card) 51' | Stadium: Stadio Olimpico; Attendance: 25,000; Referee: Gianpaolo Calvarese |

| 25 February 2018 26 | Hellas Verona | 2–1 | Torino | Verona |
| 15:00 CET (UTC+01:00) | Valoti 12', 77'; Petković (yellow card) 29'; Ferrari (yellow card) 39'; Rômulo (yellow card) 44' | Report | Burdisso (yellow card) 13'; Niang 49' | Stadium: Stadio Marc'Antonio Bentegodi; Attendance: 13,724; Referee: Davide Massa |

| 10 March 2018 28 | Hellas Verona | 1–0 | Chievo | Verona |
| 20:45 CET (UTC+01:00) | Büchel (yellow card) 29'; Caracciolo 52'; Matos (yellow card) 84'; F. Zuculini (yellow card) 90+2'; Boldor (yellow card) 90+3' | Report | Gobbi (yellow card) 63'; Bani (yellow card) 67'; Pellissier (yellow card) 73'; Radovanović (yellow card) 75'; Cacciatore (yellow card) 89'; Dainelli (yellow card) 90+2' | Stadium: Stadio Marc'Antonio Bentegodi; Attendance: 20,414; Referee: Antonio Damato |

| 18 March 2018 29 | Hellas Verona | 0–5 | Atalanta | Verona |
| 15:00 CET (UTC+01:00) | Calvano (yellow card) 21'; Ferrari (yellow card) 43'; Valoti (yellow card) 62' | Report | Cristante 2', (yellow card) 33'; Iličić (yellow card) 27', (goal) 45+4' (pen.), 48', 69'; Gómez 71' | Stadium: Stadio Marc'Antonio Bentegodi; Attendance: 14,919; Referee: Marco Di Bello |

| 31 March 2018 30 | Internazionale | 3–0 | Hellas Verona | Milan |
| 15:00 CEST (UTC+02:00) | Icardi 1', 49'; Perišić 13'; Gagliardini (yellow card) 63' | Report | Büchel (yellow card) 5'; Fares (yellow card) 34'; Rômulo (yellow card) 77'; Nícolas (red card) 90' | Stadium: San Siro; Attendance: 60,230; Referee: Gianluca Rocchi |

| 4 April 2018 27 | Benevento | 3–0 | Hellas Verona | Benevento |
| 17:00 CEST (UTC+02:00) | Letizia 25', (yellow card) 52'; Del Pinto (yellow card) 45+1'; Diabaté 66', 84' | Report | Büchel (yellow card) 52'; Felicioli (yellow card) 68' | Stadium: Stadio Ciro Vigorito; Attendance: 11,006; Referee: Paolo Valeri |
Note: Postponed due to Fiorentina player Davide Astori's death; originally scheduled for 4 March 2018.

| 8 April 2018 31 | Hellas Verona | 1–0 | Cagliari | Verona |
| 15:00 CEST (UTC+02:00) | Fossati (yellow card) 25'; Rômulo 36' (pen.); Bianchetti (yellow card) 60'; Fares (yellow card) 83'; Valoti (yellow card) 87' | Report | Pavoletti (yellow card) 35' | Stadium: Stadio Marc'Antonio Bentegodi; Attendance: 13,918; Referee: Paolo Valeri |

| 15 April 2018 32 | Bologna | 2–0 | Hellas Verona | Bologna |
| 15:00 CEST (UTC+02:00) | Pulgar (yellow card) 20'; Verdi 31'; Crisetig (yellow card) 62'; Palacio (yellow card) 83'; Nagy 90+4' | Report | Caracciolo (yellow card) 17'; Lee (yellow card) 90+3' | Stadium: Stadio Renato Dall'Ara; Attendance: 19,172; Referee: Rosario Abisso |

| 18 April 2018 33 | Hellas Verona | 0–1 | Sassuolo | Verona |
| 20:45 CEST (UTC+02:00) | Ferrari (yellow card) 23'; Vuković (yellow card) 69'; Lee (yellow card) 90+4' | Report | Rogério (yellow card) 31'; Lemos 38'; Mazzitelli (yellow card) 61'; Duncan (yellow card) 71'; Peluso (yellow card) 75' | Stadium: Stadio Marc'Antonio Bentegodi; Attendance: 13,996; Referee: Marco Guida |

| 23 April 2018 34 | Genoa | 3–1 | Hellas Verona | Genoa |
| 20:45 CEST (UTC+02:00) | Medeiros 7'; Cofie (yellow card) 13'; Hiljemark (yellow card) 64'; Bessa 78'; Pandev 90+3' | Report | Danzi (yellow card) 29'; Valoti (yellow card) 33'; Cerci (yellow card) 57'; Rômulo 64' (pen.) | Stadium: Stadio Luigi Ferraris; Attendance: 18,839; Referee: Claudio Gavillucci |

| 29 April 2018 35 | Hellas Verona | 1–3 | SPAL | Verona |
| 15:00 CEST (UTC+02:00) | Valoti 13'; Caracciolo (yellow card) 54'; Lee (yellow card) 86' | Report | Vicari (yellow card) 23'; Everton Luiz (yellow card) 34'; Fares 45+5' (o.g.); Cionek (yellow card) 56'; Felipe 71'; Kurtić 90+3' | Stadium: Stadio Marc'Antonio Bentegodi; Attendance: 19,233; Referee: Luca Banti |

| 5 May 2018 36 | Milan | 4–1 | Hellas Verona | Milan |
| 18:00 CEST (UTC+02:00) | Çalhanoğlu 10'; Cutrone 32'; Abate 49'; Borini (yellow card) 70', (goal) 89' | Report | Lee 85' | Stadium: San Siro; Attendance: 49,644; Referee: Fabrizio Pasqua |

| 13 May 2018 37 | Hellas Verona | 0–1 | Udinese | Verona |
| 15:00 CEST (UTC+02:00) | Fossati (yellow card) 28'; Rômulo (yellow card) 74' | Report | Barák 20'; Samir (yellow card) 40'; Behrami (yellow card) 59' | Stadium: Stadio Marc'Antonio Bentegodi; Attendance: 14,190; Referee: Gianpaolo Calvarese |

| 19 May 2018 38 | Juventus | 2–1 | Hellas Verona | Turin |
| 15:00 CEST (UTC+02:00) | Rugani 49'; Pjanić 52' | Report | Fares (yellow card) 51'; Fossati (yellow card) 58'; Cerci 76' | Stadium: Allianz Stadium; Attendance: 40,380; Referee: Riccardo Pinzani |

=== Coppa Italia ===
| 13 August 2017 Third round | Hellas Verona | 3–1 | Avellino | Verona |
| 20:30 CEST (UTC+02:00) | Ferrari (yellow card) 30'; Verde 34', 38'; Bessa (yellow card) 56'; B. Zuculini 87' | Report | D'Angelo (yellow card) 3'; Castaldo 49'; Falasco (yellow card) 83' | Stadium: Stadio Marc'Antonio Bentegodi; Attendance: 7,771; Referee: Paolo Mazzoleni |

| 29 November 2017 Fourth round | Chievo | 1–1 (a.e.t.) (4–5 p) | Hellas Verona | Verona |
| 18:00 CET (UTC+01:00) | Gaudino (yellow card) 5'; Pellissier 8' | Report | Fares 34'; Heurtaux (yellow card) 36'; Fossati (yellow card) 93' | Stadium: Stadio Marc'Antonio Bentegodi; Attendance: 4,000; Referee: Maurizio Mariani |
| | Penalties |
| | Pellissier (penalty missed); Cacciatore (penalty scored); Dainelli (penalty scored); Radovanović (penalty scored); Inglese (penalty scored) | | (penalty scored) Rômulo; (penalty scored) Fossati; (penalty scored) Verde; (penalty scored) Tupta; (penalty scored) B. Zuculini |

| 13 December 2017 Round of 16 | Milan | 3–0 | Hellas Verona | Milan |
| 21:00 CET (UTC+01:00) | Suso 23'; Romagnoli 30'; Cutrone 55' | Report | B. Zuculini (yellow card) 16' | Stadium: San Siro; Attendance: 9,263; Referee: Claudio Gavillucci |

== Statistics ==
=== Appearances and goals ===
| No. | Pos | Nat | Player | Total | | Serie A | | Coppa Italia | |
| No. | Pos | Nat | Player | Apps | Goals | Apps | Goals | Apps | Goals |
Goalkeepers
| 1 | GK | (Brazil) BRA | Nícolas | 37 | 0 | 36 | 0 | 1 | 0 |
| 17 | GK | (Italy) ITA | Marco Silvestri | 4 | 0 | 2 | 0 | 2 | 0 |
| 40 | GK | (Italy) ITA | Ferdinando Coppola | 0 | 0 | 0 | 0 | 0 | 0 |
Defenders
| 6 | DF | (Italy) ITA | Michelangelo Albertazzi | 0 | 0 | 0 | 0 | 0 | 0 |
| 12 | DF | (Italy) ITA | Antonio Caracciolo | 33 | 2 | 32+1 | 2 | 0 | 0 |
| 22 | DF | (Italy) ITA | Matteo Bianchetti | 2 | 0 | 1+1 | 0 | 0 | 0 |
| 25 | DF | (Romania) ROU | Deian Boldor | 1 | 0 | 1 | 0 | 0 | 0 |
| 26 | DF | (Serbia) SRB | Jagoš Vuković | 15 | 1 | 15 | 1 | 0 | 0 |
| 28 | DF | (Italy) ITA | Alex Ferrari | 27 | 1 | 25 | 1 | 2 | 0 |
| 33 | DF | (Albania) ALB | Marash Kumbulla | 0 | 0 | 0 | 0 | 0 | 0 |
| 69 | DF | (France) FRA | Samuel Souprayen | 25 | 0 | 19+3 | 0 | 3 | 0 |
| 75 | DF | (France) FRA | Thomas Heurtaux | 19 | 0 | 16+1 | 0 | 2 | 0 |
| 97 | DF | (Italy) ITA | Gian Filippo Felicioli | 8 | 0 | 2+4 | 0 | 1+1 | 0 |
Midfielders
| 2 | MF | (Italy) ITA | Rômulo | 40 | 3 | 36+1 | 3 | 3 | 0 |
| 4 | MF | (Italy) ITA | Simon Laner | 0 | 0 | 0 | 0 | 0 | 0 |
| 8 | MF | (Italy) ITA | Marco Fossati | 19 | 0 | 11+6 | 0 | 2 | 0 |
| 14 | MF | (Argentina) ARG | Franco Zuculini | 11 | 0 | 3+8 | 0 | 0 | 0 |
| 20 | MF | (Italy) ITA | Mattia Zaccagni | 7 | 0 | 2+4 | 0 | 0+1 | 0 |
| 23 | MF | (Italy) ITA | Simone Calvano | 15 | 1 | 7+8 | 0 | 0 | 0+1 |
| 27 | MF | (Italy) ITA | Mattia Valoti | 28 | 3 | 18+8 | 3 | 1+1 | 0 |
| 72 | MF | (Italy) ITA | Andrea Danzi | 5 | 0 | 4+1 | 0 | 0 | 0 |
| 77 | MF | (Liechtenstein) LIE | Marcel Büchel | 24 | 0 | 20+3 | 0 | 1 | 0 |
Forwards
| 7 | FW | (Italy) ITA | Daniele Verde | 33 | 4 | 22+8 | 2 | 1+2 | 2 |
| 9 | FW | (Italy) ITA | Moise Kean | 20 | 4 | 12+7 | 4 | 1 | 0 |
| 10 | FW | (Italy) ITA | Alessio Cerci | 25 | 3 | 22+2 | 3 | 1 | 0 |
| 16 | FW | (England) ENG | Rolando Aarons | 11 | 0 | 6+5 | 0 | 0 | 0 |
| 21 | FW | (South Korea) KOR | Lee Seung-woo | 16 | 1 | 1+13 | 1 | 2 | 0 |
| 29 | FW | (Slovakia) SVK | Ľubomír Tupta | 3 | 0 | 0+2 | 0 | 0+1 | 0 |
| 30 | FW | (Brazil) BRA | Ryder Matos | 14 | 0 | 11+3 | 0 | 0 | 0 |
| 37 | FW | (Italy) ITA | Enrico Bearzotti | 7 | 0 | 4+2 | 0 | 1 | 0 |
| 70 | FW | (Croatia) CRO | Bruno Petković | 16 | 0 | 10+6 | 0 | 0 | 0 |
| 93 | FW | (Algeria) ALG | Mohamed Fares | 33 | 1 | 29+1 | 0 | 2+1 | 1 |
Players transferred out during the season
| 5 | MF | (Argentina) ARG | Bruno Zuculini | 19 | 3 | 15+1 | 2 | 2+1 | 1 |
| 11 | FW | (Italy) ITA | Giampaolo Pazzini | 20 | 4 | 7+12 | 4 | 1 | 0 |
| 24 | MF | (Italy) ITA | Daniel Bessa | 20 | 1 | 15+2 | 1 | 3 | 0 |
| 26 | DF | (Uruguay) URU | Martín Cáceres | 15 | 3 | 14 | 3 | 1 | 0 |

Last updated: 19 May 2018
Source: Competitions

=== Goalscorers ===
| Rank | No. | Pos | Nat | Name | Serie A | Coppa Italia | Total |
|---|---|---|---|---|---|---|---|
| 1 | 7 | FW | (Italy) | Daniele Verde | 2 | 2 | 4 |
| 1 | 9 | FW | (Italy) | Moise Kean | 4 | 0 | 4 |
| 1 | 11 | FW | (Italy) | Giampaolo Pazzini | 4 | 0 | 4 |
| 4 | 2 | MF | (Italy) | Rômulo | 3 | 0 | 3 |
| 4 | 5 | MF | (Argentina) | Bruno Zuculini | 2 | 1 | 3 |
| 4 | 10 | FW | (Italy) | Alessio Cerci | 3 | 0 | 3 |
| 4 | 26 | DF | (Uruguay) | Martín Cáceres | 3 | 0 | 3 |
| 4 | 27 | MF | (Italy) | Mattia Valoti | 3 | 0 | 3 |
| 9 | 12 | DF | (Italy) | Antonio Caracciolo | 2 | 0 | 2 |
| 10 | 21 | FW | (South Korea) | Lee Seung-woo | 1 | 0 | 1 |
| 10 | 24 | MF | (Italy) | Daniel Bessa | 1 | 0 | 1 |
| 10 | 26 | DF | (Serbia) | Jagoš Vuković | 1 | 0 | 1 |
| 10 | 28 | DF | (Italy) | Alex Ferrari | 1 | 0 | 1 |
| 10 | 93 | FW | (Algeria) | Mohamed Fares | 0 | 1 | 1 |
| Own goal | | | | | 0 | 0 | 0 |
| Totals | | | | | 30 | 4 | 34 |

Last updated: 19 May 2018

=== Clean sheets ===
| Rank | No. | Pos | Nat | Name | Serie A | Coppa Italia | Total |
|---|---|---|---|---|---|---|---|
| 1 | 1 | GK | (Brazil) | Nícolas | 7 | 0 | 7 |
| Totals | | | | | 7 | 0 | 7 |

Last updated: 19 May 2018

=== Disciplinary record ===
| No. | Pos | Nat | Name | Serie A | | | Coppa Italia | | | Total | | |
| No. | Pos | Nat | Name | Booked | (yellow card) (yellow-red card) | Sent off (straight red) | Booked | (yellow card) (yellow-red card) | Sent off (straight red) | Booked | (yellow card) (yellow-red card) | Sent off (straight red) |
| 1 | GK | (Brazil) | Nícolas | 2 | 0 | 1 | 0 | 0 | 0 | 2 | 0 | 1 |
| 12 | DF | (Italy) | Antonio Caracciolo | 6 | 0 | 0 | 0 | 0 | 0 | 6 | 0 | 0 |
| 22 | DF | (Italy) | Matteo Bianchetti | 1 | 0 | 0 | 0 | 0 | 0 | 1 | 0 | 0 |
| 25 | DF | (Romania) | Deian Boldor | 1 | 0 | 0 | 0 | 0 | 0 | 1 | 0 | 0 |
| 26 | DF | (Uruguay) | Martín Cáceres | 3 | 0 | 0 | 0 | 0 | 0 | 3 | 0 | 0 |
| 26 | DF | (Serbia) | Jagoš Vuković | 1 | 0 | 0 | 0 | 0 | 0 | 1 | 0 | 0 |
| 28 | DF | (Italy) | Alex Ferrari | 5 | 0 | 0 | 1 | 0 | 0 | 6 | 0 | 0 |
| 69 | DF | (France) | Samuel Souprayen | 1 | 1 | 0 | 0 | 0 | 0 | 1 | 1 | 0 |
| 75 | DF | (France) | Thomas Heurtaux | 2 | 1 | 0 | 1 | 0 | 0 | 3 | 1 | 0 |
| 97 | DF | (Italy) | Gian Filippo Felicioli | 1 | 0 | 0 | 0 | 0 | 0 | 1 | 0 | 0 |
| 2 | MF | (Italy) | Rômulo | 7 | 0 | 0 | 0 | 0 | 0 | 7 | 0 | 0 |
| 5 | MF | (Argentina) | Bruno Zuculini | 4 | 2 | 1 | 1 | 0 | 0 | 5 | 2 | 1 |
| 8 | MF | (Italy) | Marco Fossati | 5 | 0 | 0 | 1 | 0 | 0 | 6 | 0 | 0 |
| 14 | MF | (Argentina) | Franco Zuculini | 1 | 0 | 0 | 0 | 0 | 0 | 1 | 0 | 0 |
| 20 | MF | (Italy) | Mattia Zaccagni | 1 | 0 | 0 | 0 | 0 | 0 | 1 | 0 | 0 |
| 23 | MF | (Italy) | Simone Calvano | 1 | 0 | 0 | 0 | 0 | 0 | 1 | 0 | 0 |
| 24 | MF | (Italy) | Daniel Bessa | 5 | 0 | 0 | 1 | 0 | 0 | 6 | 0 | 0 |
| 27 | MF | (Italy) | Mattia Valoti | 9 | 0 | 0 | 0 | 0 | 0 | 9 | 0 | 0 |
| 72 | MF | (Italy) | Andrea Danzi | 1 | 0 | 0 | 0 | 0 | 0 | 1 | 0 | 0 |
| 77 | MF | (Liechtenstein) | Marcel Büchel | 9 | 0 | 0 | 0 | 0 | 0 | 9 | 0 | 0 |
| 9 | FW | (Italy) | Moise Kean | 5 | 0 | 0 | 0 | 0 | 0 | 5 | 0 | 0 |
| 10 | FW | (Italy) | Alessio Cerci | 1 | 0 | 0 | 0 | 0 | 0 | 1 | 0 | 0 |
| 11 | FW | (Italy) | Giampaolo Pazzini | 1 | 0 | 0 | 0 | 0 | 0 | 1 | 0 | 0 |
| 21 | FW | (South Korea) | Lee Seung-woo | 4 | 0 | 0 | 0 | 0 | 0 | 4 | 0 | 0 |
| 30 | FW | (Brazil) | Ryder Matos | 1 | 0 | 0 | 0 | 0 | 0 | 1 | 0 | 0 |
| 70 | FW | (Croatia) | Bruno Petković | 1 | 0 | 0 | 0 | 0 | 0 | 1 | 0 | 0 |
| 93 | FW | (Algeria) | Mohamed Fares | 12 | 0 | 0 | 0 | 0 | 0 | 12 | 0 | 0 |
| Totals | | | | 91 | 4 | 2 | 5 | 0 | 0 | 96 | 4 | 2 |

Last updated: 19 May 2018
