= Cláudio Winck =

Brazilian footballer (born 1994)

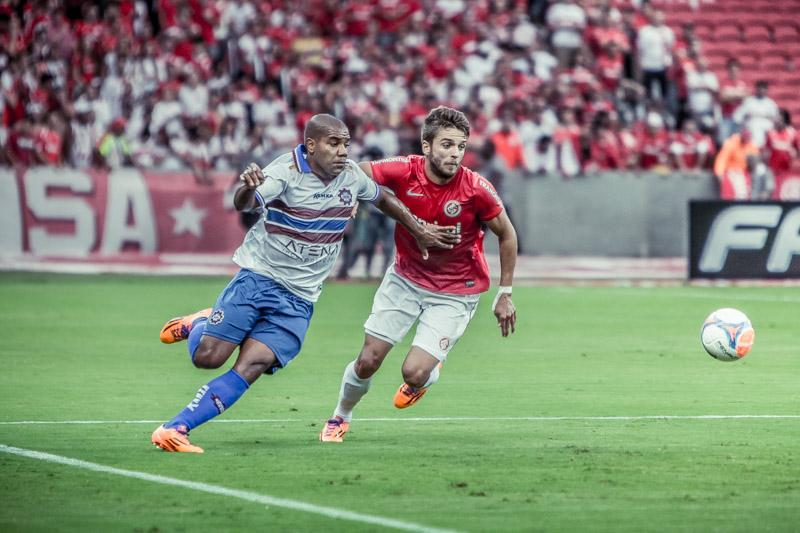

Personal information
- Full name: Cláudio Winck Neto
- Date of birth: 15 April 1994 (age 32)
- Place of birth: Portão, Brazil
- Height: 1.84 m (6 ft 1/2 in)
- Position: Right back

Team information
- Current team: Kasımpaşa
- Number: 2

Youth career
- 2008–2009: Grêmio
- 2010–2013: Internacional

Senior career*
Years	Team	Apps	(Gls)
2012–2018	Internacional	62	(9)
2015–2016	→ Verona (loan)	0	(0)
2016	→ Chapecoense (loan)	6	(1)
2018	→ Sport (loan)	21	(3)
2019–2020	Vasco da Gama	9	(0)
2020–2023	Marítimo	95	(11)
2023–	Kasımpaşa	88	(9)

International career
2011	Brazil U17	6	(2)
2014	Brazil U21	6	(0)
2015	Brazil U23	1	(0)
- * Club domestic league appearances and goals as of 10 June 2026

Cláudio Winck Neto (born 15 April 1994), known as Cláudio Winck, is a Brazilian professional footballer who plays as a right back for Turkish team Kasimpasa. He is also a former Brazilian youth international.

== Club career ==
=== Internacional ===
Winck was born in Marília, São Paulo, and joined Internacional's youth setup in 2010 from rivals Grêmio. He made his first team debut on 22 January 2012, starting in a 2–3 Campeonato Gaúcho away loss against Avenida.

Winck only appeared in one further match for the side before returning to the under-20s, but was definitely promoted to the main squad in December 2012. A backup to Gabriel, he made his Série A debut on 11 August 2013 by coming on as a second half substitute in a 2–2 home draw against Clube Atlético Paranaense.

Winck started the 2014 season by scoring a double in a 2–2 Recopa Gaúcha draw against Pelotas, as his side lost the title on penalties. On 18 July 2014 he scored his goal in the top tier, but in a 1–2 loss at Corinthians.

==== Verona (loan) ====
On 21 July 2015, Winck completed a loan move to Italian Serie A side Hellas Verona. He made his debut for the club on 2 December, replacing Luca Checchin and scoring winner in a 1–0 victory over Pavia for the season's Coppa Italia.

Winck returned to Brazil in March 2016, with his loan spell being ended early by agreement between the two clubs. He failed to feature in any Serie A matches and in total made two cup appearances for Verona during his loan.

==== Chapecoense (loan) ====
On 18 March 2016, immediately after returning from Italy, Winck was loaned to Chapecoense until December. He made his debut for the club on 24 April, starting and scoring his team's first in a 2–3 Campeonato Catarinense away loss against Criciúma.

Winck did not board LaMia Airlines Flight 2933 for the 2016 Copa Sudamericana Finals, which crashed and killed 19 of his teammates.

=== Marítimo ===
On 14 September 2020, Winck signed a tree-year contract with Marítimo.

=== Kasımpaşa ===
On July 19, 2023, he signed with Süper Lig club Kasımpaşa.

== Career statistics ==
As of 27 July 2016

Club	Season	League			State League		Cup		Continental		Other		Total	
Club	Season	Division	Apps	Goals	Apps	Goals	Apps	Goals	Apps	Goals	Apps	Goals	Apps	Goals
Internacional	2012	Série A	0	0	2	0	0	0	—		—		2	0
Internacional	2013	Série A	3	0	0	0	0	0	—		1 (Note: Appearance(s) in Copa FGF)	0	4	0
Internacional	2014	Série A	12	2	11	3	2	0	1 (Note: Appearance(s) in Copa Sudamericana)	0	1 (Note: Appearance(s) in Recopa Gaúcha)	2	27	7
Internacional	2015	Série A	1	0	6	1	0	0	0	0	—		7	1
Internacional	Subtotal		16	2	19	4	2	0	1	0	2	1	40	7
Verona (loan)	2015–16	Serie A	0	0	—		2	1	—		—		2	1
Chapecoense (loan)	2016	Série A	5	0	1	1	3	0	0	0	—		9	1
Career total			21	2	20	5	7	1	1	0	2	2	51	10

== Honours ==
=== Club ===
Internacional

- Campeonato Gaúcho: 2012, 2013, 2014, 2015

Chapecoense

- Campeonato Catarinense: 2016

Vasco Da Gama

- Taça Guanabara: 2019

=== Country ===
Brazil U17

- South American Under-17 Football Championship: 2011
