= Mattia Valoti =

Italian footballer (born 1993)

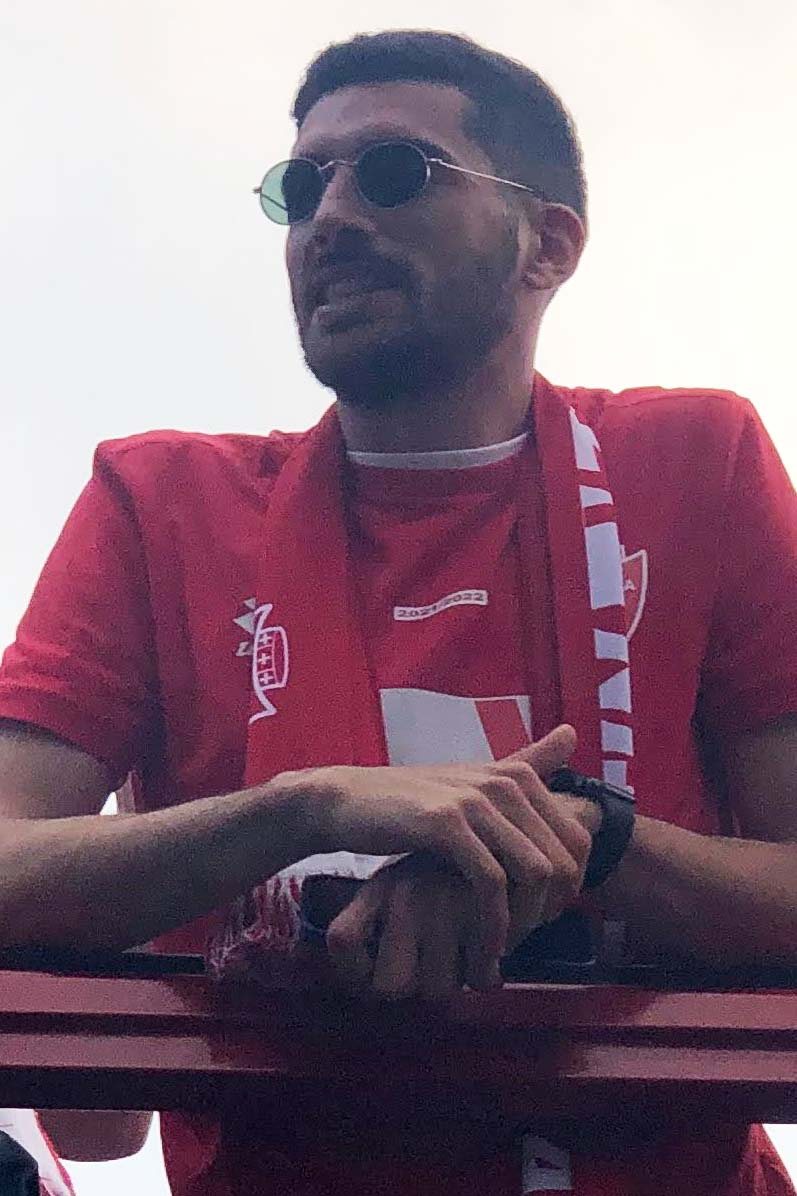
- Valoti with Monza in 2022

Personal information
- Date of birth: 6 September 1993 (age 33)
- Place of birth: Vicenza, Italy
- Height: 1.87 m (6 ft 2 in)
- Position: Midfielder

Team information
- Current team: Vicenza
- Number: 10

Youth career
- 1998–1999: Lucchese
- 1999–2001: Cosenza
- 2001–2002: Palermo
- 2002–2003: Crotone
- 2003–2004: Martina Franca
- 2004–2006: Dalmine Futura
- 2006–2011: AlbinoLeffe

Senior career*
Years	Team	Apps	(Gls)
2010–2011	AlbinoLeffe	1	(0)
2011–2014	AC Milan	0	(0)
2011	→ AlbinoLeffe (loan)	0	(0)
2013	→ AlbinoLeffe (loan)	10	(0)
2013–2014	→ AlbinoLeffe (loan)	15	(7)
2014–2015	AlbinoLeffe	0	(0)
2014–2015	→ Verona (loan)	10	(1)
2015–2019	Verona	48	(6)
2015–2016	→ Pescara (loan)	9	(1)
2016	→ Livorno (loan)	7	(0)
2018–2019	→ SPAL (loan)	24	(2)
2019–2022	SPAL	56	(14)
2021–2022	→ Monza (loan)	31	(10)
2022–2025	Monza	21	(0)
2023–2024	→ Pisa (loan)	33	(10)
2025–2026	Cremonese	12	(3)
2026	Spezia	16	(4)
2026–	Vicenza	0	(0)

International career
2008	Italy U16	1	(0)
2011	Italy U18	2	(2)
2011–2012	Italy U19	7	(1)
2014	Italy U20	1	(0)
- * Club domestic league appearances and goals as of 13 May 2026

Mattia Valoti (born 6 September 1993) is an Italian professional footballer who plays as a midfielder for Serie B club Vicenza.

== Club career ==
=== Early career ===
Valoti was born in Vicenza on 6 September 1993, the son of former footballer Aladino Valoti, who played for several Serie A and Serie B teams during the late 1980s and 1990s and was the director of football at Albinoleffe.

Mattia started playing football at the age of 5 in the youth team of Lucchese, the club where his father was playing at the time. Over the next eight years, Mattia played for several clubs, namely Cosenza, Palermo, Crotone, Martina Franca and Dalmine Futura, as a result of his father's transfers.

=== Albinoleffe ===
In 2006, Valoti settled at AlbinoLeffe, spending five seasons in the club's youth system. He went on to make his professional debut, aged 17, coming on as a substitute in a Coppa Italia game against Crotone, on 27 October 2010. Three days later, he also made his Serie B debut, again coming off the bench in a match against Novara.

During the January 2011 transfer window, Serie A club AC Milan signed Valoti on a co-ownership deal worth €800,000, though they allowed Albinoleffe to keep him on loan for the remainder of the season.

=== AC Milan ===
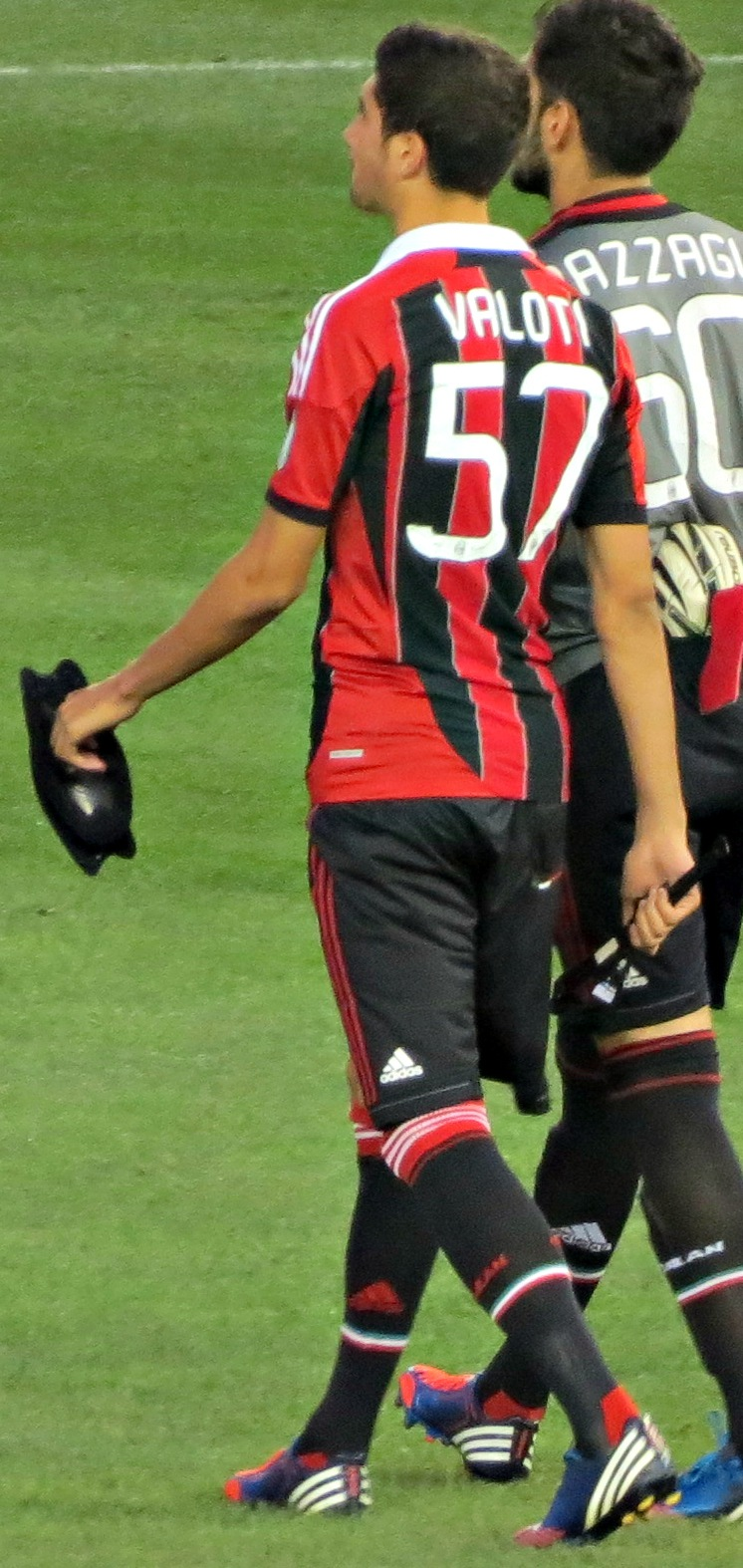
Valoti in Milan uniform

At the beginning of the 2011–12 campaign, the co-ownership deal was renewed and Valoti joined Milan, taking part in the pre-season trainings and friendlies with the first team. However, he did not make any official appearance during his first season with the Rossoneri and instead he played mainly with the Primavera (under-20) team.

For the 2012–13 season, the co-ownership was extended again. However, Valoti still made no appearances for the first team (instead featuring as an overage player for the Primavera team, which is now an under-19 team) and during the January transfer window he was loaned out to his former club Albinoleffe.

=== Return to AlbinoLeffe ===
Valoti returned to AlbinoLeffe in temporary deal on 24 January 2013. In June 2013 the co-ownership was renewed. On 25 July Milan extended the temporary deal of Valoti at AlbinoLeffe. On 20 June 2014, Milan sold Valoti back to AlbinoLeffe for €400,000 fee. However, AlbinoLeffe decided to sell Valoti again on 15 July.

=== Verona ===
On 15 July 2014, Valoti signed for Serie A club Verona in a temporary deal, with an option to buy. His permanent transfer was confirmed on 7 July 2015, after AlbinoLeffe had relegated from professional leagues.

On 23 July 2015, Valoti joined Pescara on loan along with Pierluigi Cappelluzzo (loan) and Francesco Zampano (definitive).

On 1 February 2016, Valoti signed for Livorno.

=== SPAL ===
On 6 July 2018, Valoti signed with SPAL on loan until 30 June 2019. On 1 July 2019, Valoti signed with SPAL.

=== Monza ===
On 12 July 2021, Valoti joined Serie B side Monza on a one-year loan with a conditional obligation to buy. He made his debut on 11 September, in a 1–1 league draw against his former club SPAL. Valoti's first goal for Monza came on 27 November, equalising against Ascoli in a 1–1 draw. Following Monza's Serie A promotion on 29 May 2022, Valoti's obligation for purchase clause was triggered.

On 23 August 2023, Valoti was loaned to Pisa, with an option to buy.

=== Cremonese ===
On 3 February 2025, Valoti moved to Cremonese in Serie B.

=== Spezia ===
On 15 January 2026, Valoti signed with Spezia until the end of the 2025–26 season, with an option to extend.

=== Vicenza ===
On 23 July 2026, Valoti joined Vicenza in Serie B for two seasons.

== Career statistics ==
As of match played 19 January 2023

Club	Season	League			Coppa Italia		Other		Total	
Club	Season	Division	Apps	Goals	Apps	Goals	Apps	Goals	Apps	Goals
Albinoleffe	2010–11	Serie B	1	0	1	0	—		2	0
AC Milan	2011–12	Serie A	0	0	0	0	—		0	0
AC Milan	2012–13	Serie A	0	0	0	0	—		0	0
AC Milan	2013–14	Serie A	—		—		—		0	0
AC Milan	2014–15	Serie A	—		—		—		0	0
AC Milan	Total		1	0	1	0	0	0	2	0
Albinoleffe (loan)	2010–11	Serie B	0	0	0	0	—		0	0
Albinoleffe (loan)	2012–13	Lega Pro	10	0	0	0	—		10	0
Albinoleffe (loan)	2013–14	Lega Pro	15	7	0	0	1 (Note: Appearance(s) in play-offs)	0	16	7
Albinoleffe	2014–15	Lega Pro	—		—		—		0	0
Hellas Verona (loan)	2014–15	Serie A	10	1	3	0	—		13	1
Hellas Verona	2015–16	Serie A	—		—		—		0	0
Hellas Verona	2016–17	Serie B	22	3	2	0	—		24	3
Hellas Verona	2017–18	Serie A	26	3	2	0	—		28	3
Hellas Verona	2018–19	Serie B	—		—		—		0	0
Hellas Verona	Total		48	6	4	0	0	0	52	6
Pescara (loan)	2015–16	Serie B	9	1	2	1	—		11	2
Livorno (loan)	2015–16	Serie B	7	0	0	0	—		7	0
SPAL (loan)	2018–19	Serie A	24	2	1	0	—		25	2
SPAL	2019–20	Serie A	27	3	3	2	—		30	5
SPAL	2020–21	Serie B	29	11	2	0	—		31	11
SPAL	Total		56	14	5	2	0	0	61	16
Monza (loan)	2021–22	Serie B	31	10	0	0	—		31	10
Monza	2022–23	Serie A	5	0	3	3	—		8	3
Career total			216	41	19	6	1	0	236	47

== Honours ==
AC Milan

- Supercoppa Italiana: 2011
