= Pinton =

Pinton is a surname. Notable people with the surname include:

- Andrea Pinton (born 1996), Italian footballer
- Louis Pinton (1948–2016), French politician
- Matteo Pinton (born 1998), Italian footballer
- Vincenzo Pinton (1914–1980), Italian fencer

== See also ==
- Hinton (name)
