= Felicioli =

Felicioli is an Italian surname. Notable people with the surname include:

- Gian Filippo Felicioli (born 1997), Italian footballer
- Jean-Loup Felicioli (born 1960), French film maker
