= 2015–16 Hellas Verona FC season =

Hellas Verona
2015–16 season
- President: Maurizio Setti
- Manager: Andrea Mandorlini (until 30 November 2015); Luigi Delneri (from 1 December 2015)
- Stadium: Stadio Marc'Antonio Bentegodi
- Serie A: 20th
- Coppa Italia: Round of 16
- Top goalscorer: League: Giampaolo Pazzini, Luca Toni (6); All: Luca Toni (7)
- Highest home attendance: 23,423 vs Juventus (8 May 2016, Serie A)
- Lowest home attendance: 2,373 vs Pavia (2 December 2015, Coppa Italia)
- Average home league attendance: 18,194
Home colours	Away colours	Third colours

The 2015–16 season was Hellas Verona Football Club's third consecutive season in Serie A. The club endured an awful league season, failing to win a game until after the halfway point of the season and finishing 20th. Meanwhile, the club fared little better in the Coppa Italia, being eliminated by Napoli in the Round of 16.

== Players ==
=== Squad information ===
As of 2 February 2016

Note: Flags indicate national team as defined under FIFA eligibility rules; some limited exceptions apply. Players may hold more than one non-FIFA nationality.

No.	Pos.	Nation	Player
2	MF	ITA	Rômulo
3	DF	ITA	Eros Pisano
4	DF	BRA	Samir (on loan from Udinese)
5	DF	SWE	Filip Helander
6	DF	ITA	Michelangelo Albertazzi
7	MF	SRB	Boško Janković
8	MF	ITA	Luca Marrone (on loan from Juventus)
9	FW	ITA	Luca Toni (captain)
11	FW	ITA	Giampaolo Pazzini
12	DF	BRA	Gilberto (on loan from Fiorentina)
13	MF	POL	Paweł Wszołek (on loan from Sampdoria)
14	MF	POL	Dominik Furman (on loan from Toulouse)
16	FW	ITA	Luca Siligardi
18	DF	GRE	Vangelis Moras

No.	Pos.	Nation	Player
19	MF	ITA	Leandro Greco
21	FW	ARG	Juanito
22	DF	ITA	Matteo Bianchetti
23	MF	MDA	Artur Ioniță
24	MF	ITA	Federico Viviani
27	FW	CRO	Ante Rebić (on loan from Fiorentina)
28	MF	NED	Urby Emanuelson
35	FW	SVK	Ľubomír Tupta
37	GK	ITA	Ferdinando Coppola
41	DF	BRA	Cláudio Winck
69	DF	FRA	Samuel Souprayen
93	FW	ALG	Mohamed Fares
95	GK	ITA	Pierluigi Gollini
97	MF	ITA	Luca Checchin

== Transfers ==
=== In ===
Date	Pos.	Player	Age	Moving from	Fee	Notes	Source
22 June 2015	MF	(Italy) Luca Checchin	29	(Italy) Alessandria	Undisclosed		
30 June 2015	DF	(France) Samuel Souprayen	37	(France) Dijon	Free		
30 June 2015	MF	(Italy) Federico Viviani	34	(Italy) Roma	€4M		
2 July 2015	MF	(Italy) Luca Siligardi	38	(Italy) Livorno	Free		
7 July 2015	MF	(Italy) Mattia Valoti	32	(Italy) AlbinoLeffe	Free		
11 July 2015	FW	(Italy) Giampaolo Pazzini	41	(Italy) Milan	Free		

==== Loans in ====
Date	Pos.	Player	Age	Moving from	Fee	Notes	Source
28 January 2016	MF	(Italy) Luca Marrone	36	(Italy) Carpi			

== Competitions ==
=== Serie A ===
==== League table ====
Pos	Team	Pld	W	D	L	GF	GA	GD	Pts	Qualification or relegation
16	Palermo	38	10	9	19	38	65	−27	39 (Note: Palermo ahead of Udinese on head-to-head points; Palermo 6 points, Udinese 0 points.)	
17	Udinese	38	10	9	19	35	60	−25	39	
18	Carpi (R)	38	9	11	18	37	57	−20	38	Relegation to Serie B
19	Frosinone (R)	38	8	7	23	35	76	−41	31	Relegation to Serie B
20	Hellas Verona (R)	38	5	13	20	34	63	−29	28	Relegation to Serie B

Source: Serie A, Soccerway
Rules for classification: 1) Points; 2) Head-to-head points; 3) Head-to-head goal difference; 4) Goal difference; 5) Goals scored; 6) Draw.
(R) Relegated

==== Results summary ====
Overall								Home						Away					
Pld	W	D	L	GF	GA	GD	Pts	W	D	L	GF	GA	GD	W	D	L	GF	GA	GD
38	5	13	20	34	63	−29	28	4	6	9	21	30	−9	1	7	11	13	33	−20

Last updated: 16 May 2016.
Source: Competitive matches

==== Results by round ====
Round	1	2	3	4	5	6	7	8	9	10	11	12	13	14	15	16	17	18	19	20	21	22	23	24	25	26	27	28	29	30	31	32	33	34	35	36	37	38
Ground	H	A	H	A	A	H	A	H	A	H	A	H	H	A	H	A	H	A	H	A	H	A	H	H	A	H	A	H	A	H	A	A	H	A	H	A	H	A
Result	D	L	D	D	L	L	D	D	L	L	D	L	L	L	L	D	D	L	L	D	D	D	W	D	L	W	L	L	D	L	W	L	L	L	W	L	W	L
Position	11	15	15	15	15	18	18	18	19	19	19	19	19	20	20	20	20	20	20	20	20	20	20	20	20	20	20	20	20	20	20	20	20	20	20	20	20	20

Updated to match(es) played on 9 May 2016. Source: Competitive matches
A = Away; H = Home; W = Win; D = Draw; L = Loss

==== Matches ====
22 August 2015 1	Hellas Verona	1–1	Roma	Verona
18:00 CEST (UTC+02:00)	Souprayen (yellow card) 33'; Juanito (yellow card) 51'; Janković 61'	Report	Florenzi 66'; Castán (yellow card) 87'	Stadium: Stadio Marc'Antonio Bentegodi; Attendance: 22,255; Referee: Marco Guida

30 August 2015 2	Genoa	2–0	Hellas Verona	Genoa
20:45 CEST (UTC+02:00)	Pavoletti 57'; Izzo (yellow card) 59'; Gakpé 76'; Rincón (yellow card) 89'	Report	Moras (yellow card) 45+1'; Pazzini (yellow card) 73'	Stadium: Stadio Luigi Ferraris; Attendance: 19,462; Referee: Daniele Orsato

13 September 2015 3	Hellas Verona	2–2	Torino	Verona
12:30 CEST (UTC+02:00)	Toni 49' (pen.), (yellow card) 90+2'; Pisano (yellow card) 62'; Janković (yellow card) 65'; Juanito 72'; Márquez (yellow card) 81'; Greco (yellow card) 90+3'	Report	Avelar (yellow card) 11'; Baselli 66', (yellow card) 90+2'; Acquah 73'	Stadium: Stadio Marc'Antonio Bentegodi; Attendance: 17,868; Referee: Massimiliano Irrati

20 September 2015 4	Atalanta	1–1	Hellas Verona	Bergamo
15:00 CEST (UTC+02:00)	De Roon (yellow card) 54'; Raimondi (yellow card) 86'; Moralez 89'; Monachello (yellow card) 90+4'	Report	Souprayen (yellow card) 13'; Janković (yellow card) 45+1' (yellow-red card) 79'; Sala (yellow card) 49'; Pisano 90+7'	Stadium: Stadio Atleti Azzurri d'Italia; Attendance: 14,323; Referee: Fabio Maresca

23 September 2015 5	Internazionale	1–0	Hellas Verona	Milan
20:45 CEST (UTC+02:00)	Guarín (yellow card) 3'; Kondogbia (yellow card) 37'; Melo 56', (yellow card) 90+1'; Biabiany (yellow card) 90+3'	Report	Albertazzi (yellow card) 9'; Sala (yellow card) 61'; Greco (yellow card) 65'; Helander (yellow card) 82'	Stadium: San Siro; Attendance: 34,548; Referee: Carmine Russo

27 September 2015 6	Hellas Verona	1–2	Lazio	Verona
15:00 CEST (UTC+02:00)	Hallfreðsson (yellow card) 14'; Helander 33'; Sala (yellow card) 78'	Report	Maurício (yellow card) 25' (yellow-red card) 81'; Biglia 63' (pen.); Lulić (yellow card) 67'; Parolo 86', (yellow card) 90+2'	Stadium: Stadio Marc'Antonio Bentegodi; Attendance: 16,591; Referee: Piero Giacomelli

3 October 2015 7	Chievo	1–1	Hellas Verona	Verona
20:45 CEST (UTC+02:00)	Cesar (yellow card) 58'; Meggiorini (yellow card) 76'; Castro 83'	Report	Pisano 70'	Stadium: Stadio Marc'Antonio Bentegodi; Attendance: 18,000; Referee: Daniele Doveri

18 October 2015 8	Hellas Verona	1–1	Udinese	Verona
15:00 CEST (UTC+02:00)	Pazzini 41' (pen.); Márquez (yellow card) 53'; Hallfreðsson (yellow card) 74'	Report	Wagué (yellow card) 40'; Felipe (yellow card) 67'; Théréau 84'	Stadium: Stadio Marc'Antonio Bentegodi; Attendance: 16,382; Referee: Claudio Gavillucci

25 October 2015 9	Sampdoria	4–1	Hellas Verona	Genoa
12:30 CET (UTC+01:00)	Muriel 11'; Zukanović 28'; Soriano 45+1'; Éder 54'; Cassani (yellow card) 59'; Fernando (yellow card) 70'	Report	Juanito (yellow card) 38'; Ioniță 75'; Sala (yellow card) 87'	Stadium: Stadio Luigi Ferraris; Attendance: 21,082; Referee: Maurizio Mariani

28 October 2015 10	Hellas Verona	0–2	Fiorentina	Verona
20:45 CET (UTC+01:00)	Pisano (yellow card) 16'; Greco (yellow card) 30'; Matuzalém (yellow card) 39'; Juanito (yellow card) 71'; Souprayen (yellow card) 90'	Report	Márquez 25' (o.g.); Valero (yellow card) 38'; Rossi (yellow card) 50'; Kalinić 57'	Stadium: Stadio Marc'Antonio Bentegodi; Attendance: 18,222; Referee: Paolo Valeri

1 November 2015 11	Carpi	0–0	Hellas Verona	Modena
15:00 CET (UTC+01:00)	Marrone (yellow card) 14'; Romagnoli (yellow card) 35'	Report	Hallfreðsson (yellow card) 6'; Pisano (yellow card) 38'; Moras (yellow card) 72'	Stadium: Stadio Alberto Braglia; Attendance: 7,093; Referee: Paolo Mazzoleni

7 November 2015 12	Hellas Verona	0–2	Bologna	Verona
18:00 CET (UTC+01:00)	Pazzini (yellow card) 88'	Report	Giaccherini 6'; Donsah 14', (yellow card) 71'	Stadium: Stadio Marc'Antonio Bentegodi; Attendance: 18,007; Referee: Daniele Orsato

22 November 2015 13	Hellas Verona	0–2	Napoli	Verona
15:00 CET (UTC+01:00)	Greco (yellow card) 6'; Pisano (yellow card) 53'; Janković (yellow card) 56'	Report	Hysaj (yellow card) 53'; Insigne (yellow card) 59', (goal) 67'; Higuaín 74'	Stadium: Stadio Marc'Antonio Bentegodi; Attendance: 17,483; Referee: Antonio Damato

29 November 2015 14	Frosinone	3–2	Hellas Verona	Frosinone
15:00 CET (UTC+01:00)	Ciofani 22' (pen.), 40'; Blanchard (yellow card) 43'; Dionisi 48'	Report	Souprayen (yellow card) 18'; Rafael (red card) 20'; Viviani (yellow card) 45+1', (goal) 69'; Hallfreðsson (yellow card) 60'; Moras (yellow card) 64', (goal) 75'	Stadium: Stadio Matusa; Attendance: 6,864; Referee: Nicola Rizzoli

6 December 2015 15	Hellas Verona	0–1	Empoli	Verona
15:00 CET (UTC+01:00)	Hallfreðsson (yellow card) 63'	Report	Mário Rui (yellow card) 6'; Costa (yellow card) 11', (goal) 61'; Büchel (yellow card) 40'; Paredes (yellow card) 60'	Stadium: Stadio Marc'Antonio Bentegodi; Attendance: 15,198; Referee: Paolo Tagliavento

13 December 2015 16	Milan	1–1	Hellas Verona	Milan
15:00 CET (UTC+01:00)	Bacca 52'; De Jong (red card) 56'; Bonaventura (yellow card) 72'; Abate (yellow card) 73'; Kucka (yellow card) 86'	Report	Toni 57' (pen.); Moras (yellow card) 60'; Pisano (yellow card) 68'; Wszołek (yellow card) 71'; Ioniță (yellow card) 72'; Márquez (yellow card) 82'; Gollini (yellow card) 84'	Stadium: San Siro; Attendance: 27,497; Referee: Paolo Valeri

20 December 2015 17	Hellas Verona	1–1	Sassuolo	Verona
15:00 CET (UTC+01:00)	Hallfreðsson (yellow card) 1'; Toni 39'; Sala (yellow card) 50'	Report	Missiroli (yellow card) 5'; Floccari 35'	Stadium: Stadio Marc'Antonio Bentegodi; Attendance: 16,949; Referee: Marco Guida

6 January 2016 18	Juventus	3–0	Hellas Verona	Turin
15:00 CET (UTC+01:00)	Dybala 8'; Bonucci 45'; Marchisio (yellow card) 45+2'; Alex Sandro (yellow card) 60'; Sturaro (yellow card) 80'; Zaza 82'	Report	Greco (yellow card) 24'; Hallfreðsson (yellow card) 48'	Stadium: Juventus Stadium; Attendance: 40,171; Referee: Gianpaolo Calvarese

10 January 2016 19	Hellas Verona	0–1	Palermo	Verona
15:00 CET (UTC+01:00)	Pazzini (yellow card) 54'; Toni (yellow card) 70'	Report	Vázquez 27', (yellow card) 74'; Goldaniga (yellow card) 44'; Jajalo (yellow card) 47'; Morganella (yellow card) 83'	Stadium: Stadio Marc'Antonio Bentegodi; Attendance: 15,325; Referee: Luca Banti

17 January 2016 20	Roma	1–1	Hellas Verona	Rome
15:00 CET (UTC+01:00)	Nainggolan 41'	Report	Pazzini 61' (pen.); Sala (yellow card) 67'; Greco (yellow card) 74'	Stadium: Stadio Olimpico; Attendance: 29,709; Referee: Davide Massa

24 January 2016 21	Hellas Verona	1–1	Genoa	Verona
15:00 CET (UTC+01:00)	Pisano (yellow card) 25'; Pazzini 39'; Hallfreðsson (yellow card) 90+1'	Report	Coppola 19' (o.g.); Džemaili (yellow card) 35'; De Maio (yellow card) 88'	Stadium: Stadio Marc'Antonio Bentegodi; Attendance: 15,806; Referee: Gianluca Rocchi

31 January 2016 22	Torino	0–0	Hellas Verona	Turin
15:00 CET (UTC+01:00)		Report	Janković (yellow card) 44'; Greco (yellow card) 58'; Helander (yellow card) 62'; Pazzini (yellow card) 90+3'	Stadium: Stadio Olimpico di Torino; Attendance: 15,838; Referee: Maurizio Mariani

3 February 2016 23	Hellas Verona	2–1	Atalanta	Verona
20:45 CET (UTC+01:00)	Albertazzi (yellow card) 15'; Siligardi 42'; Ioniță (yellow card) 45+2'; Pazzini 83'	Report	Dramé (yellow card) 20' (yellow-red card) 55'; Conti 30'; De Roon (yellow card) 43'; Migliaccio (yellow card) 83'; Pinilla (yellow card) 90+1'	Stadium: Stadio Marc'Antonio Bentegodi; Attendance: 15,490; Referee: Marco Di Bello

7 February 2016 24	Hellas Verona	3–3	Internazionale	Verona
12:30 CET (UTC+01:00)	Helander 13'; Pisano 16'; Wszołek (yellow card) 36'; Ioniță 57'; Fares (yellow card) 60'; Marrone (yellow card) 83'	Report	Murillo 8'; Melo (yellow card) 31'; Icardi 61'; Telles (yellow card) 77'; Perišić 78'	Stadium: Stadio Marc'Antonio Bentegodi; Attendance: 21,104; Referee: Piero Giacomelli

11 February 2016 25	Lazio	5–2	Hellas Verona	Rome
20:45 CET (UTC+01:00)	Matri 45'; Mauri 50'; Anderson 69'; Maurício (yellow card) 71'; Keita 82'; Candreva 90' (pen.)	Report	Greco 72'; Toni 79'	Stadium: Stadio Olimpico; Attendance: 10,000; Referee: Andrea Gervasoni

20 February 2016 26	Hellas Verona	3–1	Chievo	Verona
18:00 CET (UTC+01:00)	Toni 29'; Pazzini 57'; Moras (yellow card) 59' (yellow-red card) 70'; Wszołek (yellow card) 80'; Ioniță 90+5'	Report	Spolli (yellow card) 29' (yellow-red card) 79'; Frey (yellow card) 40'; Pinzi (yellow card) 45'; Pellissier 71' (pen.); Rigoni (yellow card) 90+3'	Stadium: Stadio Marc'Antonio Bentegodi; Attendance: 22,469; Referee: Marco Guida

28 February 2016 27	Udinese	2–0	Hellas Verona	Udine
15:00 CET (UTC+01:00)	Badu 31'; Théréau 56'; Felipe (yellow card) 73'	Report	Pazzini (yellow card) 44'; Fares (yellow card) 60'; Bianchetti (yellow card) 67'	Stadium: Stadio Friuli; Attendance: 14,776; Referee: Daniele Doveri

5 March 2016 28	Hellas Verona	0–3	Sampdoria	Verona
18:00 CET (UTC+01:00)	Gilberto (yellow card) 44'; Marrone (yellow card) 57'	Report	Christodoulopoulos (yellow card) 3', (goal) 30'; Soriano 6'; Cassano 11'; Fernando (yellow card) 62'; Ranocchia (yellow card) 74'	Stadium: Stadio Marc'Antonio Bentegodi; Attendance: 18,900; Referee: Angelo Cervellera

13 March 2016 29	Fiorentina	1–1	Hellas Verona	Florence
15:00 CET (UTC+01:00)	Zárate 40'; Astori (yellow card) 47'; Fernández (yellow card) 88'	Report	Helander (yellow card) 13'; Pisano 86'	Stadium: Stadio Artemio Franchi; Attendance: 33,081; Referee: Claudio Gavillucci

20 March 2016 30	Hellas Verona	1–2	Carpi	Verona
15:00 CET (UTC+01:00)	Pisano (yellow card) 32'; Ioniță 63'; Rebić (yellow card) 82' (yellow-red card) 90'	Report	Di Gaudio 42'; Suagher (yellow card) 54'; Lasagna 66'; Poli (yellow card) 84'; Crimi (yellow card) 90+4'	Stadium: Stadio Marc'Antonio Bentegodi; Attendance: 17,707; Referee: Carmine Russo

4 April 2016 31	Bologna	0–1	Hellas Verona	Bologna
20:45 CEST (UTC+02:00)	Maietta (yellow card) 22'; Giaccherini (yellow card) 68'; Ferrari (yellow card) 90+4'	Report	Samir 42'; Viviani (yellow card) 53'	Stadium: Stadio Renato Dall'Ara; Attendance: 16,606; Referee: Davide Ghersini

10 April 2016 32	Napoli	3–0	Hellas Verona	Naples
15:00 CEST (UTC+02:00)	Albiol (yellow card) 23'; Gabbiadini 33'; Insigne 45+2' (pen.); Chiricheș (yellow card) 61'; Callejón 70'	Report	Samir (yellow card) 21'; Bianchetti (yellow card) 39'; Souprayen (red card) 45'	Stadium: Stadio San Paolo; Attendance: 42,784; Referee: Domenico Celi

17 April 2016 33	Hellas Verona	1–2	Frosinone	Verona
15:00 CET (UTC+01:00)	Bianchetti (yellow card) 23', (goal) 64'; Viviani (yellow card) 62'; Toni (yellow card) 90+5'	Report	Russo 15'; Frara (yellow card) 30', (goal) 90+2'; Crivello (yellow card) 74'; Paganini (yellow card) 90+5'	Stadium: Stadio Marc'Antonio Bentegodi; Attendance: 17,761; Referee: Daniele Doveri

20 April 2016 34	Empoli	1–0	Hellas Verona	Empoli
20:45 CEST (UTC+02:00)	Saponara (yellow card) 44'; Maccarone 50'	Report	Viviani (yellow card) 16' (yellow-red card) 90'; Bianchetti (yellow card) 19'; Souprayen (yellow card) 26'; Wszołek (yellow card) 90+2'	Stadium: Stadio Carlo Castellani; Attendance: 7,816; Referee: Marco Serra

25 April 2016 35	Hellas Verona	2–1	Milan	Verona
17:00 CEST (UTC+02:00)	Albertazzi (yellow card) 48'; Pazzini 72' (pen.); Siligardi 90+5'	Report	Ménez 21'; Zapata (yellow card) 67'; Mauri (yellow card) 73'	Stadium: Stadio Marc'Antonio Bentegodi; Attendance: 18,738; Referee: Marco Di Bello

1 May 2016 36	Sassuolo	1–0	Hellas Verona	Reggio Emilia
15:00 CEST (UTC+02:00)	Pellegrini 58'	Report	Albertazzi (yellow card) 39'	Stadium: Mapei Stadium – Città del Tricolore; Attendance: 10,389; Referee: Claudio Gavillucci

8 May 2016 37	Hellas Verona	2–1	Juventus	Verona
20:45 CEST (UTC+02:00)	Siligardi (yellow card) 16'; Marrone (yellow card) 32'; Toni 43' (pen.); Viviani 55'; Helander (yellow card) 90+4'	Report	Zaza (yellow card) 26'; Alex Sandro (yellow card) 42' (yellow-red card) 90+2'; Lemina (yellow card) 51'; Dybala 90+4' (pen.)	Stadium: Stadio Marc'Antonio Bentegodi; Attendance: 23,423; Referee: Fabio Maresca

15 May 2016 38	Palermo	3–2	Hellas Verona	Palermo
15:00 CEST (UTC+02:00)	Vázquez 28', (yellow card) 86'; Morganella (red card) 35'; Maresca 51'; Gilardino 64', (yellow card) 65'	Report	Wszołek (red card) 35'; Viviani 48', (yellow card) 68'; Pisano 84'; Checchin (yellow card) 90+1'	Stadium: Stadio Renzo Barbera; Referee: Massimiliano Irrati

=== Coppa Italia ===
15 August 2015 Third round	Hellas Verona	3–1	Foggia	Verona
20:30 CEST (UTC+02:00)	Hallfreðsson 23'; Toni 61'; Janković 79'		Loiacono 18'	Stadium: Stadio Marc'Antonio Bentegodi; Attendance: 6,958; Referee: Fabrizio Pasqua

2 December 2015 Fourth round	Hellas Verona	1–0	Pavia	Verona
18:00 CET (UTC+01:00)	Winck 90+1', (yellow card) 90+1'	Report	Pavan (yellow card) 87'	Stadium: Stadio Marc'Antonio Bentegodi; Attendance: 2,373; Referee: Eugenio Abbattista

16 December 2015 Round of 16	Napoli	3–0	Hellas Verona	Naples
19:00 CET (UTC+01:00)	El Kaddouri 4'; Mertens 12'; Callejón 75'	Report		Stadium: Stadio San Paolo; Attendance: 7,221; Referee: Massimiliano Irrati

== Statistics ==
=== Appearances and goals ===
No.	Pos	Nat	Player	Total		Serie A		Coppa Italia	
No.	Pos	Nat	Player	Apps	Goals	Apps	Goals	Apps	Goals
Goalkeepers
32	GK	(Italy) ITA	Enrico Vencato	0	0	0	0	0	0
37	GK	(Italy) ITA	Ferdinando Coppola	3	0	1	0	2	0
95	GK	(Italy) ITA	Pierluigi Gollini	26	0	25	0	1	0
Defenders
3	DF	(Italy) ITA	Eros Pisano	37	5	33+1	5	3	0
4	DF	(Brazil) BRA	Samir	3	1	3	1	0	0
5	DF	(Sweden) SWE	Filip Helander	27	2	21+3	2	3	0
6	DF	(Italy) ITA	Michelangelo Albertazzi	10	0	9+1	0	0	0
12	DF	(Brazil) BRA	Gilberto	5	0	0+5	0	0	0
18	DF	(Greece) GRE	Vangelis Moras	33	1	30+1	1	2	0
22	DF	(Italy) ITA	Matteo Bianchetti	26	1	17+6	1	3	0
40	DF	(Italy) ITA	Andrea Badan	1	0	0	0	1	0
41	DF	(Brazil) BRA	Cláudio Winck	3	1	0	0	0+3	1
69	DF	(France) FRA	Samuel Souprayen	21	0	18+2	0	0+1	0
Midfielders
2	MF	(Italy) ITA	Rômulo	9	0	0+9	0	0	0
7	MF	(Serbia) SRB	Boško Janković	18	1	11+4	1	3	0
8	MF	(Italy) ITA	Luca Marrone	12	0	10+2	0	0	0
13	MF	(Poland) POL	Paweł Wszołek	30	0	23+5	0	2	0
14	MF	(Poland) POL	Dominik Furman	1	0	0+1	0	0	0
19	MF	(Italy) ITA	Leandro Greco	28	1	22+4	1	0+2	0
20	MF	(Italy) ITA	Mattia Zaccagni	5	0	0+3	0	0+2	0
23	MF	(Moldova) MDA	Artur Ioniță	32	4	27+4	4	1	0
24	MF	(Italy) ITA	Federico Viviani	20	3	17+2	3	0+1	0
28	MF	(Netherlands) NED	Urby Emanuelson	11	0	6+5	0	0	0
97	MF	(Italy) ITA	Luca Checchin	7	0	1+3	0	3	0
Forwards
9	FW	(Italy) ITA	Luca Toni	24	6	20+3	6	1	0
11	FW	(Italy) ITA	Giampaolo Pazzini	30	6	20+10	6	0	0
16	FW	(Italy) ITA	Luca Siligardi	30	2	17+11	2	2	0
21	FW	(Argentina) ARG	Juanito	33	1	19+14	1	0	0
27	FW	(Croatia) CRO	Ante Rebić	10	0	6+4	0	0	0
35	FW	(Slovakia) SVK	Ľubomír Tupta	1	0	0	0	1	0
93	FW	(Algeria) ALG	Mohamed Fares	13	0	7+4	0	2	0
Players transferred out during the season
1	GK	(Brazil) BRA	Rafael	12	0	12	0	0	0
4	DF	(Mexico) MEX	Rafael Márquez	9	0	9	0	0	0
10	MF	(Iceland) ISL	Emil Hallfreðsson	19	0	15+1	0	3	0
26	MF	(Italy) ITA	Jacopo Sala	18	0	17+1	0	0	0
27	MF	(Brazil) BRA	Matuzalém	7	0	2+5	0	0	0

Last updated: 15 May 2016
Source: Competitions

=== Goalscorers ===
Rank	No.	Pos	Nat	Name	Serie A	Coppa Italia	Total
1	9	FW	(Italy)	Luca Toni	6	1	7
2	11	FW	(Italy)	Giampaolo Pazzini	6	0	6
3	3	DF	(Italy)	Eros Pisano	5	0	5
4	23	MF	(Moldova)	Artur Ioniță	4	0	4
5	24	MF	(Italy)	Federico Viviani	3	0	3
6	5	DF	(Sweden)	Filip Helander	2	0	2
6	7	MF	(Serbia)	Boško Janković	1	1	2
6	16	FW	(Italy)	Luca Siligardi	2	0	2
9	4	DF	(Brazil)	Samir	1	0	1
9	10	MF	(Iceland)	Emil Hallfreðsson	0	1	1
9	18	DF	(Greece)	Vangelis Moras	1	0	1
9	19	MF	(Italy)	Leandro Greco	1	0	1
9	21	FW	(Argentina)	Juanito	1	0	1
9	22	DF	(Italy)	Matteo Bianchetti	1	0	1
9	41	DF	(Brazil)	Cláudio Winck	0	1	1
Own goal					0	0	0
Totals					34	4	38

Last updated: 15 May 2016

=== Clean sheets ===
Rank	No.	Pos	Nat	Name	Serie A	Coppa Italia	Total
1	95	GK	(Italy)	Pierluigi Gollini	2	1	3
2	1	GK	(Brazil)	Rafael	1	0	1
Totals					3	1	4

Last updated: 4 April 2016
