= Samuel Di Carmine =

Italian footballer

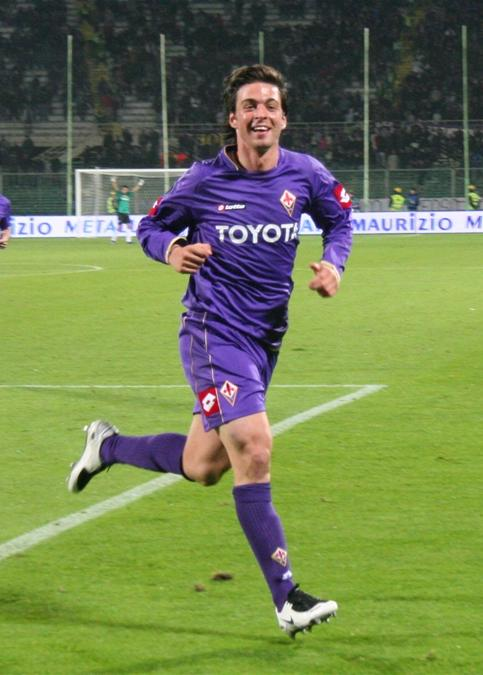
- Di Carmine with Fiorentina in November 2007

Personal information
- Date of birth: 29 September 1988 (age 38)
- Place of birth: Florence, Italy
- Height: 1.87 m (6 ft 2 in)
- Position: Striker

Team information
- Current team: Livorno
- Number: 13

Youth career
- –2007: Fiorentina

Senior career*
| Years | Team | Apps | (Gls) |
| 2006–2010 | Fiorentina | 3 | (0) |
| 2008–2009 | → Queens Park Rangers (loan) | 27 | (2) |
| 2009–2010 | → Gallipoli (loan) | 32 | (2) |
| 2010–2011 | Frosinone | 12 | (0) |
| 2011–2013 | Cittadella | 74 | (14) |
| 2013–2015 | Juve Stabia | 65 | (20) |
| 2015–2019 | Perugia | 90 | (38) |
| 2016 | → Virtus Entella (loan) | 17 | (3) |
| 2018–2019 | → Verona (loan) | 28 | (11) |
| 2019–2021 | Verona | 34 | (8) |
| 2021 | → Crotone (loan) | 11 | (0) |
| 2021–2022 | Cremonese | 33 | (5) |
| 2022–2023 | Perugia | 29 | (4) |
| 2023–2024 | Catania | 26 | (8) |
| 2024–2025 | Trento | 33 | (14) |
| 2025– | Livorno | 27 | (11) |

International career
| 2005 | Italy U18 | 2 | (0) |
| 2006–2008 | Italy U19 | 3 | (0) |
| 2006–2010 | Italy U21 | 2 | (0) |
- * Club domestic league appearances and goals as of 30 April 2026

Samuel Di Carmine (born 29 September 1988) is an Italian professional footballer who plays as a striker for Serie C Group B club Livorno.

== Career ==
Di Carmine, a powerful striker, made his Serie A debut on 25 October 2006 away to Torino in a 1–0 win. He scored his first goal with the viola in a 2007–08 UEFA Cup match, the final goal in a clear 6–1 win to IF Elfsborg on 8 November 2007.

On 1 July 2008, Championship side Queens Park Rangers, owned by Italian Formula One mogul and businessman Flavio Briatore, signed Di Carmine on loan for the 2008–09 season.

On 28 October 2008, Di Carmine scored his first league goal for Queens Park Rangers, scoring in the 54th minute against Birmingham.

On 19 August 2009, he was loaned to Serie B club Gallipoli. Two days later, he played his first game for the club, substitute William Pianu in the second half. The match ended in a 1–1 draw with Ascoli.

Di Carmine was signed by Serie B club Frosinone in co-ownership deal for a peppercorn fee of €500.

On 7 July 2011, Di Carmine joined Cittadella. Cittadella bought 50% registration rights from relegated Frosinone. He was expected to replace Federico Piovaccari as team topscorer. Eventually Nunzio Di Roberto was the topscorer with 10 goals, and Di Carmine 1 goal short with 9 goals.

In the summer of 2013, he moved to S.S. Juve Stabia. Despite the club relegated from Serie B, he remained with the club.

Di Carmine was loaned out to Hellas Verona from Perugia for the 2018–19 season. He helped the team clinch promotion to Serie A with his 11 league goals and Verona signed him on a permanent contract ahead of the 2019–20 season.

On 28 January 2021, Di Carmine joined Crotone on loan until the end of the 2020–21 season.

On 24 August 2021, he signed a two-year contract with Cremonese.

On 1 September 2022, Di Carmine returned to Perugia.

On 20 August 2023, Di Carmine moved to Catania.

On 30 August 2024, he signed with Trento.
