= Eros Pisano =

Italian footballer (born 1987)

Personal information
- Full name: Eros Pisano
- Date of birth: 31 March 1987 (age 39)
- Place of birth: Busto Arsizio, Italy
- Height: 1.85 m (6 ft 1 in)
- Position: Right-back

Team information
- Current team: ChievoVerona
- Number: 3

Youth career
- Varese

Senior career*
Years	Team	Apps	(Gls)
2004–2011	Varese	156	(14)
2007–2008	→ Pisa (loan)	6	(0)
2011–2013	Palermo	39	(0)
2013	Genoa	10	(1)
2013–2015	Palermo	38	(2)
2015	→ Verona (loan)	15	(0)
2015–2017	Verona	59	(8)
2017–2019	Bristol City	31	(2)
2020–2021	Pisa	32	(1)
2021–2022	Feralpisalò	25	(1)
2023–2025	Lumezzane	61	(4)
2025–	ChievoVerona	15	(0)

International career
2006	Italy U-20 Serie C	1	(0)
- * Club domestic league appearances and goals as of 4 March 2026

Eros Pisano (born 31 March 1987) is an Italian footballer who plays as a right-back for Serie D club ChievoVerona.

== Club career ==
=== Varese ===
Pisano started his career at hometown club Varese, and won the Serie D Group A championship and was promoted. He also played for Varese in Eccellenza in 2004–05 season, played in the national promotion playoffs.

In 2006–07 season, he made his professional debut in Serie C2, completing the season in 11th place. In July 2007 he was sold to Serie B team Pisa in co-ownership deal. However, he only played 7 times in the second division, including once in the relegation playoffs.

In the next season he returned to Varese. Varese gave up the remain 50% rights to Pisa in June 2008, and he returned to Varese in a co-ownership deal in August. In June 2009 Varese acquired the remaining 50% of Pisano's transfer rights from Pisa, and he proved to be instrumental as his team became Lega Pro Seconda Divisione Group A champions in 2008–09 and then won the 2009–10 Lega Pro Prima Divisione playoffs, thus ensuring two consecutive promotions in a row. In the 2010–11 Serie B, Pisano appeared in 40 league games out of 42, and his team surprised once again as Varese ended the regular season in fourth place, then losing the promotion playoff semi-finals to Padova.

=== Palermo and Genoa ===
On 8 June 2011 Serie A team Palermo announced the signing of Pisano from Varese for €1.85 million. He made his debut in Serie A on 11 September 2011 in a 4–3 victory against Inter.

In January 2013 he was sold to Genoa in a co-ownership exchange deal for Brazilian defensive midfielder Anselmo. He returned to Palermo in June after the Sicilians, then relegated to Serie B, re-acquired full ownership of his transfer rights in a blind auction for €531,000, in a three-year contract.

=== Hellas Verona ===
On 2 February 2015 he moved permanently to Verona, initially on a temporary deal. He was sold for free.

=== Bristol City ===
On 27 June 2017, Bristol City announced the signing of the free agent on a two-year deal, effectively on 1 July. He started the first five games of the season, before firstly a knee injury kept him out for six weeks and then a torn hamstring ruled him out for 4 months. He was released by Bristol City at the end of the 2018–19 season.

=== Return to Pisa ===
On 23 January 2020 he signed with Serie B club Pisa.

=== Feralpisalò ===
On 31 August 2021 he joined to Serie C club Feralpisalò.

== Representative career ==
He was capped once for Serie C under-20 representative team in 2006–07 Mirop Cup. He also capped for "U-20 Serie C" at Serie C Quadrangular Trophy, winning representative teams of Serie C2 Group B and C.

== Career statistics ==
As of match played 7 May 2021

Appearances and goals by club, season and competition
Club	Season	League			National Cup		League Cup		Other		Total	
Club	Season	Division	Apps	Goals	Apps	Goals	Apps	Goals	Apps	Goals	Apps	Goals
Varese	2004–05	Serie D	2	1	0	0	—		0	0	2	1
Varese	2005–06	Serie D	32	2	1	0	—		4 (Note: Appearances in Coppa Italia Serie D)	0	37	2
Varese	2006–07	Serie C2	22	1	4	0	—		—		26	1
Varese	2007–08	Serie C2	0	0	—		—		—		0	0
Varese	2008–09	Seconda Divisione	28	3	5	1	—		—		33	4
Varese	2009–10	Prima Divisione	32	2	3	0	—		4 (Note: Appearances in Lega Pro Prima Divisione Promotion play-offs)	0	39	2
Varese	2010–11	Serie B	40	5	1	1	—		2 (Note: Appearance(s) in Serie B Promotion play-offs)	1	43	7
Varese	Varese Total		156	14	14	2	—		10	1	180	17
Pisa (loan)	2007–08	Serie B	6	0	1	0	—		1	0	8	0
Palermo	2011–12	Serie A	28	0	0	0	—		0	0	28	0
Palermo	2012–13	Serie A	11	0	2	0	—		—		13	0
Genoa	2012–13	Serie A	10	1	—		—		—		10	1
Palermo	2013–14	Serie B	34	2	2	1	—		—		36	3
Palermo	2014–15	Serie A	4	0	1	0	—		—		5	0
Palermo	Palermo Total		77	2	5	1	—		0	0	82	3
Hellas Verona (loan)	2014–15	Serie A	15	0	—		—		—		15	0
Hellas Verona	2015–16	Serie A	34	5	3	0	—		—		37	5
Hellas Verona	2016–17	Serie B	25	3	2	0	—		—		27	3
Hellas Verona	Verona Total		74	8	5	0	—		—		79	8
Bristol City	2017–18	Championship	16	0	0	0	1	0	—		17	0
Bristol City	2018–19	Championship	15	2	1	0	1	0	—		17	2
Bristol City	Total		31	2	1	0	2	0	—		34	2
Pisa	2019–20	Serie B	16	1	0	0	—		—		16	1
Pisa	2020–21	Serie B	16	0	2	0	—		—		18	0
Pisa	Total		32	1	2	0	—		—		34	1
Feralpisalò	2021–22	Serie C	0	0	—		—		—		0	0
Career total			386	28	28	3	2	0	11	1	427	32

== Honours ==
- Lega Pro Seconda Divisione: 2009
- Serie D: 2006
