= Matteo Bianchetti =

Italian footballer (born 1993)

Personal information
- Date of birth: March 17, 1993 (age 33)
- Place of birth: Como, Italy
- Height: 1.89 m (6 ft 2 1/2 in)
- Position: Centre-back

Team information
- Current team: Cremonese
- Number: 15

Youth career
- Libertas SanBartolomeo
- –2005: Como
- 2005–2007: Corsico
- 2007–2013: Inter Milan
- 2010–2011: → Varese (loan)

Senior career*
Years	Team	Apps	(Gls)
2012–2013	Inter Milan	0	(0)
2013	→ Verona (loan)	7	(0)
2013–2019	Verona	80	(2)
2014	→ Spezia (loan)	9	(0)
2014–2015	→ Empoli (loan)	1	(0)
2015	→ Spezia (loan)	12	(0)
2019–	Cremonese	216	(5)

International career^{‡}
2011	Italy U18	5	(0)
2011–2012	Italy U19	7	(0)
2012	Italy U20	1	(0)
2013–2015	Italy U21	21	(0)
- * Club domestic league appearances and goals as of 25 May 2026 ‡ National team caps and goals as of 18 June 2015

Matteo Bianchetti (born 17 March 1993) is an Italian professional footballer who plays as a centre-back for Serie B club Cremonese.

== Club career ==
=== Inter Milan ===
Born in Como, Lombardy, Bianchetti joined Inter Milan from Corsico, a local team from the town of Corsico. He played for Inter in every ranks from U15, 16, 17 to the reserve in 2011 (U20 by regulation until 2011–12, but Inter changed to U19 internally). He also spent one season with Varese reserve in 2010–11 season as Inter did not have its own U18 team in Berretti League as wild card until 2011. Bianchetti won the 2012 Campionato Nazionale Primavera and 2011–12 NextGen Series with the U19 team.

Bianchetti was also included in the first team occasionally, but failed to play in competitive games. He was included in 2011–12 UEFA Champions League List B squad as no.44, a routine move for reserve players. (Note: Certain youth product also eligible to play if a pre-match notice was sent to UEFA (and fulfil List B requirements by UEFA), regardless he was named in the original B list or not, however List A remained locked until transfer windows.) In summer 2012 Lega Serie A changed the age limit of the reserve league to U19, and Inter's reserve transformed to a more age specific teams: U19 and U18. However, Bianchetti remained in Inter, just likes his predecessors Davide Faraoni and Samuele Longo who was one of the three age 20 "overage" player for Inter U19 reserve in 2010–11 season and 2011–12 season respectively. But on the other hand, Bianchetti was a real "overage" player as the regulation changed, thus Bianchetti did not have much chance for Inter U19 team in 2012–13 season, along with former captain Andrea Romanò, Daniel Bessa and Raffaele Di Gennaro, despite the latter two were forced to remain in Inter due to injury (Bianchetti also missed a few months since January 2012 and recovered in pre-season 2012).

Bianchetti did not play in 2012 Supercoppa Primavera, the conclusion of last season, where Inter also fielded overage players Alfred Duncan and Marko Livaja. Bianchetti remained in Inter's European squad, but promoted to List A, along with Romanò. However it was due to Inter did not have enough youth product to fill the 4 specific quota and the outcome was indifference. (Note: It would make Inter had 25-man List A squad plus nominated two players less in List B instead of a 23-man List A squad plus List B.)

=== Verona ===
As Bianchetti was lack of play time, despite he received call-up from Italy national under-21 football team, he did not debut yet. On 23 January 2013 he left for Hellas Verona F.C. of Serie B. Verona also signed former U20 player Michelangelo Albertazzi from Milan in summer 2012 but he failed to make a significant impact and did not receive any call-up since January due to injury. Bianchetti immediately entered the squad and made his competitive debut against Spezia as a last minute substitute for Emanuel Benito Rivas. He wore no.14 shirt previously owned by Simone Calvano. After the recovery of Albertazzi, Bianchetti was fall from the first priority on the bench, until regained the bench position since round 30 (missed round 33 for international duty), made 5 substitute appearances for Crespo, Raphael Martinho, Ceccarelli, Moras and Maietta respectively; Bianchetti made his only start on 22 April, due to the absence of Ceccarelli.

In June 2013 Verona bought half of the registration rights of Bianchetti for €350,000 in 3-year contract. Bianchetti made his Serie A debut on 15 September 2013. In total he made 3 Serie A appearances before leaving for Spezia in January 2014. In June 2014 the co-ownership deal between Verona and Inter was renewed.

On 29 January 2015, Spezia re-signed Bianchetti.

On 25 June 2015, Inter announced the Co-Ownership resolved in their favor, and they are sending the player to Verona in a definitive deal on 1 July.

=== Cremonese ===
On 17 August 2019, Bianchetti signed Serie B club Cremonese for free.

== International career ==
Bianchetti played twice in 2012 UEFA European Under-19 Football Championship qualification. He missed the elite round due to injury. In September 2012 he played for Italy national under-20 football team in Four Nations. In October 2012 received he call-up to 2013 UEFA European Under-21 Football Championship qualification play-offs. In January 2013 made he his debut for U21 team in a non-competitive triangular tournament between U21, 20 and 19. He was partnered with 2 other Inter youth products Luca Caldirola and Cristiano Biraghi in that 45-minute match against U20; rested against U19.

His debut for the Italy U-21 team was in a friendly game against the Germany U-21 side on 6 February 2013, playing 90 minutes.

He took part at the 2013 and captained his team at 2015 editions of the UEFA European Under-21 Championship.

== Career statistics ==
=== Club ===
As of match played 1 June 2025

Appearances and goals by club, season and competition
Club	Season	Division	League		Coppa Italia		Europe		Other		Total	
Club	Season	Division	Apps	Goals	Apps	Goals	Apps	Goals	Apps	Goals	Apps	Goals
Inter Milan	2011–12	Serie A	0	0	0	0	0	0	0	0	0	0
Inter Milan	2012–13	Serie A	0	0	0	0	0	0	—		0	0
Inter Milan	Total		0	0	0	0	0	0	0	0	0	0
Hellas Verona (loan)	2012–13	Serie B	7	0	0	0	—		—		7	0
Hellas Verona	2013–14	Serie A	3	0	0	0	—		—		3	0
Hellas Verona	2015–16	Serie A	23	1	2	0	—		—		25	1
Hellas Verona	2016–17	Serie B	34	0	3	0	—		—		37	0
Hellas Verona	2017–18	Serie A	2	0	0	0	—		—		2	0
Hellas Verona	2018–19	Serie B	18	1	0	0	—		2	0	20	1
Hellas Verona	Total		87	2	5	0	—		2	0	94	2
Spezia (loan)	2013–14	Serie B	9	0	1	0	—		1	0	11	0
Empoli (loan)	2014–15	Serie A	1	0	2	0	—		—		3	0
Spezia (loan)	2014–15	Serie B	12	0	—		—		1	0	13	0
Cremonese	2019–20	Serie B	34	1	2	0	—		—		36	1
Cremonese	2020–21	Serie B	35	0	1	0	—		—		36	0
Cremonese	2021–22	Serie B	27	0	0	0	—		—		27	0
Cremonese	2022–23	Serie B	25	1	4	0	—		—		29	1
Cremonese	2023–24	Serie B	33	2	2	0	—		4	0	39	2
Cremonese	2024–25	Serie B	35	1	1	0	—		2	0	38	1
Cremonese	Total		189	5	10	0	—		6	0	205	5
Career total			298	7	18	0	0	0	10	0	326	7
