= Simon Laner =

Italian footballer

Personal information
- Date of birth: 28 January 1984 (age 42)
- Place of birth: Merano, Italy
- Height: 1.83 m (6 ft 0 in)
- Position: Midfielder

Youth career
- Verona

Senior career*
Years	Team	Apps	(Gls)
2002–2007	Verona	7	(0)
2003–2004	→ Carrarese (loan)	23	(0)
2004–2006	→ Castelnuovo (loan)	57	(7)
2007	→ Sanremese (loan)	13	(4)
2007–2008	Pro Sesto	27	(2)
2008–2013	AlbinoLeffe	101	(17)
2010–2011	→ Cagliari (loan)	18	(0)
2012–2013	→ Verona (loan)	32	(2)
2013–2018	Verona	4	(0)
2014	→ Novara (loan)	7	(0)
2014–2015	→ Carpi (loan)	1	(0)
2015–2016	→ Chiasso (loan)	19	(4)
2016–2017	→ Modena (loan)	21	(2)
2018–2019	Adrense	24	(7)
2019–2020	Franciacorta	16	(7)
2020–2021	Crema	20	(5)
2023	Falco Albino		

International career
2002–2003	Italy U19	7	(2)
2004	Italy U20	3	(0)
- * Club domestic league appearances and goals as of 18 January 2024

Simon Laner (born 28 January 1984) is an Italian footballer who plays as a midfielder.

== Career ==
He made his Serie B debut in a 1–0 defeat for Hellas Verona F.C. against Livorno, on 14 September 2002.

=== AlbinoLeffe ===
In summer 2008 Laner joined AlbinoLeffe in a 3-year contract for €200,000 transfer fee.

On 9 August 2010 Laner joined Serie A team Cagliari along with Gabriele Perico on loan with option to co-own the players (announced originally as co-ownership deals only). As part of the deal, Andrea Cocco moved to opposite direction. (Perico and Laner costed Cagliari €750,000 and Cocco costed AlbinoLeffe €50,000.

In June 2011 Laner returned to AlbinoLeffe after Cagliari not excised the buy option.

=== Return to Verona ===
On 22 July 2012 Laner was re-signed by Serie B team Verona on a loan deal for the 2012–13 season, for €30,000 loan fee. He finished second in the league thus gaining promotion to the Serie A. The club also excised the option to sign half of his registration rights for €250,000 in a 3-year contract.

On 31 January 2014, Laner was loaned out to Serie B side Novara. In June 2014 Verona acquired Laner, Cocco and sold Simone Calvano back to AlbinoLeffe for €500 each.

The season 2014–15 saw Laner joined Carpi on loan, winning yet another promotion to the Serie A after finishing in first place.

On 25 August 2015 Laner was loaned to Swiss Italian team Chiasso.

On 29 August 2016 Laner was signed by Modena in another loan.

=== Serie D ===
On 8 September 2018 Laner joined Serie D club Adrense. With a career-high of 7 goals he played a central part for the newly promoted club to avoid relegation.
