= Matteo Franchetti =

Italian football player

Personal information
- Date of birth: 3 May 1996 (age 30)
- Place of birth: Padua, Italy
- Height: 1.79 m (5 ft 10 in)
- Position: Left-back

Team information
- Current team: ASD Godigese

Youth career
- –2014: Padova
- 2014–2015: Genoa
- 2015–2016: Verona

Senior career*
Years	Team	Apps	(Gls)
2015	Genoa	0	(0)
2016–2019	Verona	0	(0)
2016	→ Calvi Noale (loan)	14	(0)
2016–2017	→ Forlì (loan)	7	(0)
2017–2018	→ Arezzo (loan)	2	(0)
2018–2019	→ Virtus Verona (loan)	0	(0)
2019	CastelbaldoMasi		
2019–2020	US Arcella		
2020–2021	Levico Terme		
2021–	ASD Godigese		
- * Club domestic league appearances and goals as of 25 November 2018

Matteo Franchetti (born 3 May 1996) is an Italian football player. He plays for ASD Godigese.

== Club career ==
He made his Serie C debut for Forlì on 27 August 2016 in a game against Venezia.

On 8 September 2019, he joined amateur team ACD CastelbaldoMasi. He left the club on 5 December 2019 to join US Arcella. In the 2020–21 season, Franchetti played for US Levico Terme, while he joined ASD Godigese in July 2021.
