= Luigi Vitale =

Italian footballer

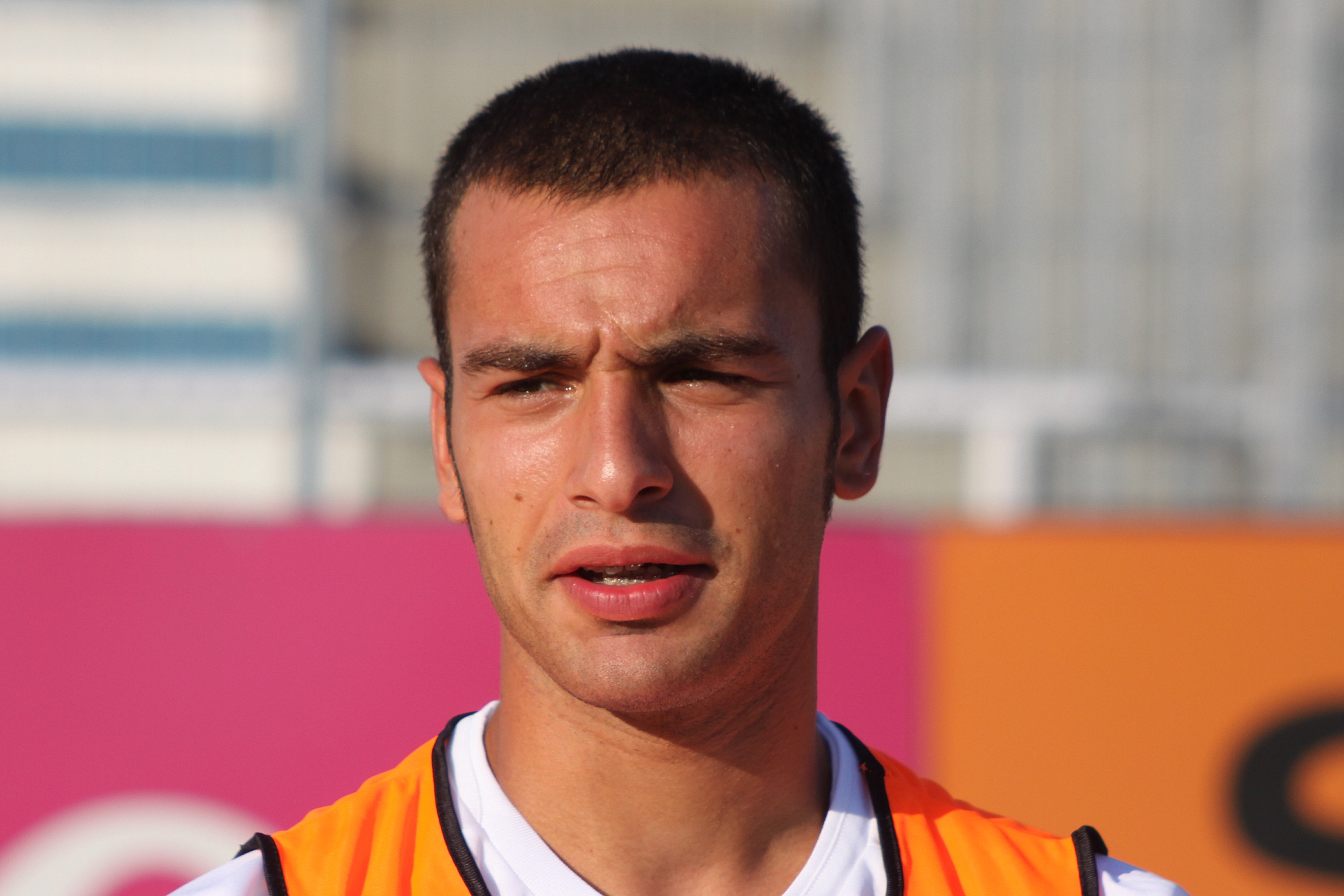

Personal information
- Date of birth: 5 October 1987 (age 39)
- Place of birth: Castellammare di Stabia, Italy
- Height: 1.80 m (5 ft 11 in)
- Positions: Left midfielder; left back; wing back

Team information
- Current team: Stabia City (head coach)

Youth career
- 1996–2002: Juve Stabia
- 2002–2004: Avellino
- 2004–2005: Napoli

Senior career*
Years	Team	Apps	(Gls)
2005–2014	Napoli	28	(1)
2007–2008	→ Virtus Lanciano (loan)	28	(0)
2009–2010	→ Livorno (loan)	22	(0)
2011–2012	→ Bologna (loan)	0	(0)
2012–2013	→ Ternana (loan)	39	(10)
2013–2014	→ Juve Stabia (loan)	19	(4)
2014–2016	Ternana	67	(1)
2016–2019	Salernitana	86	(6)
2019–2021	Verona	17	(0)
2020	→ Spezia (loan)	4	(0)
2021	Frosinone	9	(0)

Managerial career
- 2023–: Stabia City
- * Club domestic league appearances and goals as of 10 May 2021

Luigi Vitale (born 5 October 1987) is an Italian former footballer who played as a left midfielder, left back, or a left wing back, currently working as head coach of amateur club Stabia City.

== Playing career ==
A former Napoli youth product, Vitale began his professional career with the Napoli senior side in 2005, but spent several seasons on loan with other clubs in Italy. On 12 July 2011, he joined Bologna from Napoli on a season-long loan.

On 4 August 2012, he moved on loan to Ternana.

In July 2016, he joined Salernitana.

On 31 January 2019, he signed a 2.5-year contract with Verona. On 31 January 2020, Vitale joined Spezia on loan.

On 1 February 2021, he joined Frosinone.

== Coaching career ==
In July 2023, Vitale was unveiled as the new head coach of Prima Categoria amateurs Stabia City.
