= Gian Filippo Felicioli =

Italian footballer

Personal information
- Date of birth: 30 September 1997 (age 29)
- Place of birth: San Severino Marche, Italy
- Height: 1.80 m (5 ft 11 in)
- Positions: Left-back; left midfielder

Team information
- Current team: Pro Patria
- Number: 31

Youth career
- 2003–2009: CS Castelraimondo
- 2009–2010: ASD Camerino
- 2010–2011: Maceratese
- 2011–2016: AC Milan

Senior career*
Years	Team	Apps	(Gls)
2015–2019	AC Milan	1	(0)
2016–2017	→ Ascoli (loan)	21	(0)
2017–2018	→ Hellas Verona (loan)	6	(0)
2018–2019	→ Perugia (loan)	9	(0)
2019–2022	Venezia	31	(0)
2021–2022	→ Ascoli (loan)	7	(1)
2022–2023	Cittadella	6	(0)
2023–2024	Pergolettese	23	(0)
2024–2026	Foggia	29	(0)
2026–	Pro Patria	11	(0)

International career^{‡}
2012	Italy U15	2	(1)
2012–2013	Italy U16	4	(0)
2013–2014	Italy U17	12	(2)
2014–2015	Italy U18	7	(0)
2015–2016	Italy U19	6	(1)
2017–2018	Italy U20	3	(0)
2017	Italy U21	1	(0)
- * Club domestic league appearances and goals as of 30 April 2026 ‡ National team caps and goals as of 27 March 2018

Gian Filippo Felicioli (born 30 September 1997) is an Italian professional footballer who plays as a left-back for Serie D club Pro Patria.

== Club career ==
Felicioli is an AC Milan's youth sector graduate. He received his first ever call-up to the senior team from the head coach Filippo Inzaghi ahead of a home Serie A game against Parma played on 1 February 2015; despite the call, he remained an unused substitute. He made his Serie A debut on 3 May 2015 against Napoli, replacing Giacomo Bonaventura after 84 minutes in a 3–0 away defeat.

On 13 July 2016 he was loaned out to Serie B club Ascoli for one season.

On 13 June 2017 he signed a new contract with AC Milan until 2021 and was immediately loaned out to Hellas Verona for the 2 consecutive seasons. The buyout option was also included in his loan deal.

After only one year at Hellas Verona on loan, Felicioli joined to Serie B side Perugia until 30 June 2019 on loan from Milan.

On 18 July 2019, Felicioli signed to Serie B club Venezia.

On 31 August 2021, he returned to Ascoli on loan.

On 11 July 2022, Felicioli was released from his contract with Venezia by mutual consent.

On 23 July 2022, he signed with Cittadella.

On 1 September 2023, Felicioli moved to Pergolettese.

On 30 July 2024, Felicioli joined Foggia on a two-year deal.

== Personal life ==
On 16 June 2020, Venezia declared that Felicioli had tested positive for COVID-19 during its pandemic in Italy.

== Career statistics ==
=== Club ===
Updated 1 May 2023

Club	Season	League			Coppa Italia		Europe		Other		Total	
Club	Season	Division	Apps	Goals	Apps	Goals	Apps	Goals	Apps	Goals	Apps	Goals
Milan	2014–15	Serie A	1	0	0	0	–		–		1	0
Ascoli (loan)	2016–17	Serie B	21	0	1	0	–		–		22	0
Hellas Verona (loan)	2017–18	Serie A	6	0	2	0	–		–		8	0
Perugia (loan)	2018–19	Serie B	9	0	1	0	–		–		10	0
Venezia	2019–20	Serie B	7	0	2	0	–		–		9	0
Venezia	2020–21	Serie B	24	0	0	0	–		1 (Note: Appearances in Serie B – Promotion play-offs)	0	25	0
Venezia	Total		31	0	2	0	–		1	0	34	0
Ascoli (loan)	2021–22	Serie B	7	1	0	0	–		–		7	1
Cittadella	2022–23	Serie B	6	0	1	0	–		–		7	0
Career total			81	1	7	0	–		1	0	89	1
