= Edoardo Pavan =

Italian footballer (born 1998)

Personal information
- Date of birth: 14 June 1998 (age 28)
- Place of birth: Legnago, Italy
- Height: 1.76 m (5 ft 9 in)
- Position: Full-back

Team information
- Current team: Verona

Youth career
- –2017: Verona

Senior career*
Years	Team	Apps	(Gls)
2017–	Verona	0	(0)
2017–2018	→ Paganese (loan)	14	(0)
2018–2019	→ Virtus Verona (loan)	1	(0)
2019–2020	→ Pontedera (loan)	24	(0)
- * Club domestic league appearances and goals as of 23 February 2020

Edoardo Pavan (born 14 June 1998) is an Italian football player. He plays for Verona.

== Club career ==
He made his Serie C debut for Paganese on 16 September 2017 in a game against Akragas.

On 2 July 2019, he joined Pontedera on loan.
