= Karim Laribi =

Italian-Tunisian footballer (born 1991)

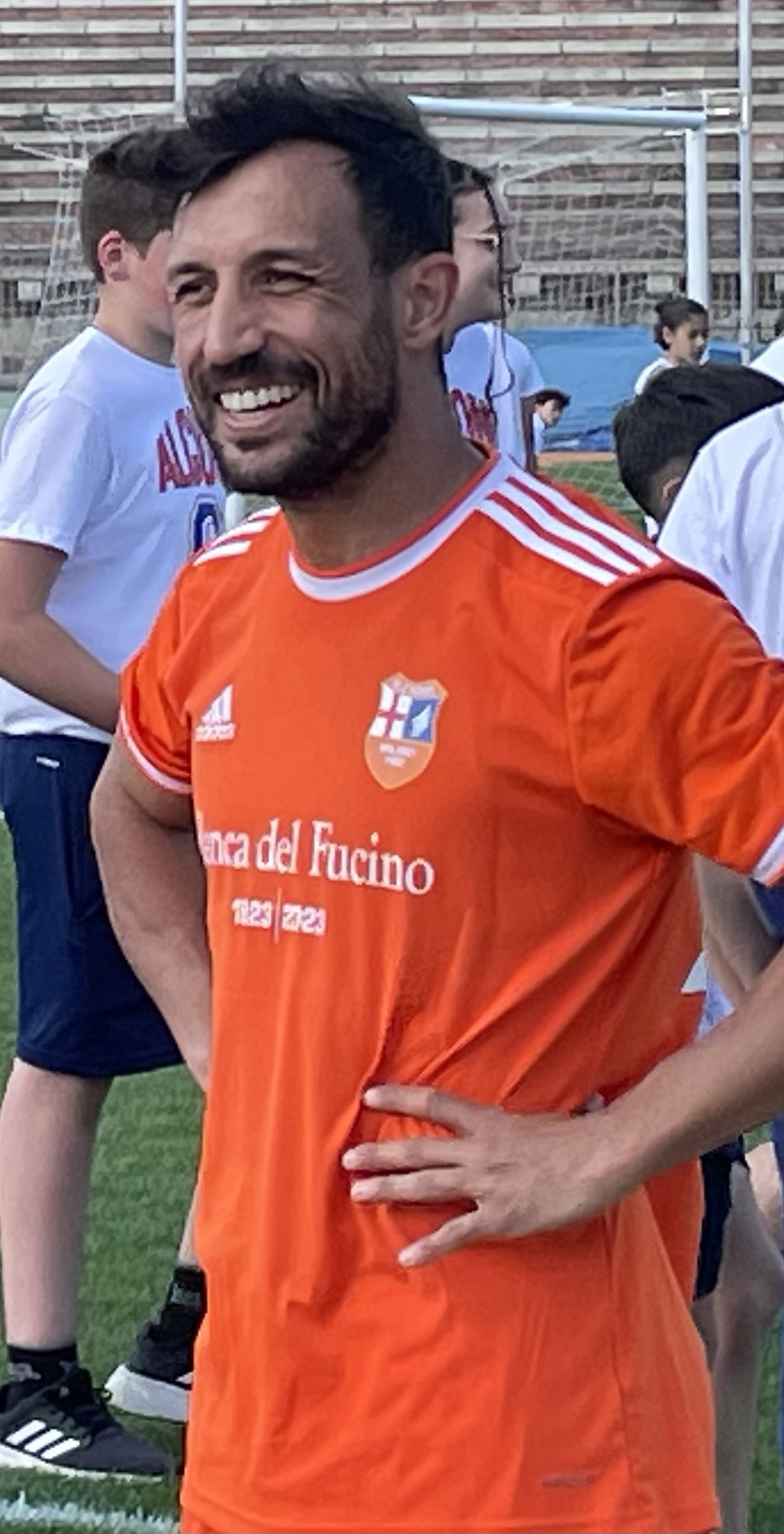

Personal information
- Date of birth: 20 April 1991 (age 35)
- Place of birth: Milan, Italy
- Height: 1.75 m (5 ft 9 in)
- Position: Left winger

Team information
- Current team: Anzio

Youth career
- 2003–2007: Inter
- 2007–2009: Fulham
- 2009–2010: Palermo

Senior career*
Years	Team	Apps	(Gls)
2010–2012	Palermo	0	(0)
2010–2011	→ Foggia (loan)	28	(4)
2011–2012	→ Sassuolo (loan)	7	(1)
2012–2017	Sassuolo	30	(0)
2014	→ Latina (loan)	10	(2)
2014–2015	→ Bologna (loan)	38	(8)
2016–2017	→ Cesena (loan)	32	(2)
2017–2018	Cesena	39	(7)
2018–2021	Hellas Verona	27	(3)
2019–2020	→ Empoli (loan)	13	(0)
2020	→ Bari (loan)	9	(2)
2021	→ Reggiana (loan)	19	(2)
2021–2022	Reggina	16	(0)
2022	→ Cittadella (loan)	17	(0)
2023	Pro Vercelli	15	(2)
2023–2024	Alcione	15	(1)
2024–	Anzio	0	(0)

International career
2010–2011	Italy U20	4	(1)
2012	Italy U21	2	(0)
2017	Tunisia	2	(0)
- * Club domestic league appearances and goals

Karim Laribi (Arabic: كريم العريبي; born 20 April 1991) is a professional footballer who plays as a left winger for Serie D club Anzio. Born in Italy to a Tunisian father and an Italian mother, Laribi represented Tunisia at senior level.

== Club career ==
=== Early career ===
A youth product of Inter, Laribi left Italy in 2007 to accept a lucrative offer from Fulham, where he spent two season as part of the club's own academy in England. He returned to Italy in 2009 as free agent to become part of the Palermo squad that won the Campionato Nazionale Primavera in 2010.

In July 2010, he was sent on loan to Lega Pro Prima Divisione club Foggia to get some first-team experience; he played a total of 28 games under the tenure of famous football master Zdeněk Zeman, scoring four goals in the season.

=== Sassuolo ===
In July 2011, Palermo accepted a loan offer for Laribi from ambitious Serie B club Sassuolo, with an option for his new club to turn the move into a co-ownership by the end of the season. On 19 June 2012, Sassuolo acquired the half of the registration rights for €100,000 fee. In June 2013, Sassuolo him outright for free.

He was loaned out to Serie B side Latina on 8 January 2014.

On 22 July 2014, Laribi joined Bologna on loan. In mid-2014, Laribi signed a new 3-year contract with Sassuolo.

=== Cesena ===
On 27 August 2016, Laribi left for Cesena on loan.

On 4 August 2017, Laribi was signed by Cesena outright.

=== Hellas Verona ===
On 31 July 2018, Laribi signed with Hellas Verona A contract until 2021.

On 8 July 2019, Laribi joined to Empoli F.C. on loan with an option to buy.

On 21 January 2020, Laribi joined Serie C club Bari on loan until 30 June 2020.

On 26 January 2021 he moved on loan to Serie B club Reggiana.

=== Reggina ===
On 16 July 2021 he signed a two-year contract with Serie B club Reggina. On 31 January 2022, Laribi joined Cittadella on loan. On 1 September 2022, Laribi's contract with Reggina was terminated by mutual consent.

=== Pro Vercelli ===
On 28 January 2023, Laribi moved to Pro Vercelli in Serie C.

=== Serie D years ===
On 7 December 2023, Laribi signed for Milan-based Serie D club Alcione on a contract until the end of the season. He departed from Alcione by the end of the season, after being part of the squad that won a historic first promotion to Serie C for the club. On 8 November 2024, he joined fellow Serie D club Anzio.

== International career ==
Laribi was born in Italy to a Tunisian father and an Italian mother. Laribi was part of the Italian youth national teams, and made his debut with the under-20 team in 2011. On 15 August 2012, he made his debut with the Italy U-21 team, in a friendly match against Netherlands.

Laribi was later called up to the Tunisia national football team, and made his debut in a 1–0 loss to Cameroon on 24 March 2017. In May 2018 he was named in Tunisia's preliminary 29 man squad for the 2018 FIFA World Cup in Russia.

== Career statistics ==
=== Club ===
As of 13 June 2019

Appearances and goals by club, season and competition
Club	Season	League			National cup		Continental		Other		Total	
Club	Season	Division	Apps	Goals	Apps	Goals	Apps	Goals	Apps	Goals	Apps	Goals
Foggia (loan)	2010–11	Lega Pro	28	4	0	0	—		—		28	4
Sassuolo (loan)	2011–12	Serie B	7	1	1	1	—		—		8	2
Sassuolo	2012–13	Serie B	9	0	0	0	—		—		9	0
Sassuolo	2013–14	Serie A	10	0	2	1	—		—		12	1
Sassuolo	Total		19	0	2	1	0	0	0	0	21	1
Latina (loan)	2013–14	Serie B	10	2	0	0	—		4	1	14	3
Bologna (loan)	2014–15	Serie B	38	8	1	0	—		4	0	43	8
Sassuolo	2015–16	Serie A	11	0	0	0	—		—		11	0
Cesena (loan)	2016–17	Serie B	32	2	3	1	—		—		35	3
Cesena	2017–18	Serie B	39	7	2	2	—		—		41	9
Hellas Verona	2018–19	Serie B	27	3	2	0	—		5	1	34	4
Career total			211	27	11	5	0	0	13	2	236	34
