= Pierluigi Cappelluzzo =

Italian footballer

Personal information
- Date of birth: 9 June 1996 (age 30)
- Place of birth: Montepulciano, Italy
- Height: 1.86 m (6 ft 1 in)
- Position: Striker

Youth career
- –2014: Siena

Senior career*
Years	Team	Apps	(Gls)
2014	Siena	10	(1)
2014–2020	Verona	13	(0)
2015–2016	→ Pescara (loan)	9	(1)
2017–2018	→ Pescara (loan)	5	(0)
2019	→ Imolese (loan)	12	(2)
2019–2020	→ Pistoiese (loan)	17	(1)
2020–2021	Viterbese	6	(0)
2021	Bra	14	(5)
2021-	Pont Donnaz	2	(0)
2021-2022	Imperia	24	(1)
- * Club domestic league appearances and goals as of 31 January 2021

Pierluigi Cappelluzzo (born 9 June 1996) is an Italian footballer who plays as striker.

== Career ==
Cappelluzzo is a youth exponent from Siena. He scored his first Serie B goal on his debut on 8 February 2014 against Bari. He joined Hellas Verona in 2014 from Siena.

In January 2017 he signed a new 3 1/2-year contract.

On 5 July 2017 he was loaned to Pescara.

On 30 January 2019 he was loaned to Imolese.

On 24 August 2019 he joined Pistoiese on loan.

On 5 October 2020 Verona sold his rights to Serie C club Viterbese. The contract with Viterbese was terminated by mutual consent on 1 February 2021.
