= Enrico Bearzotti =

Italian football player (born 1996)

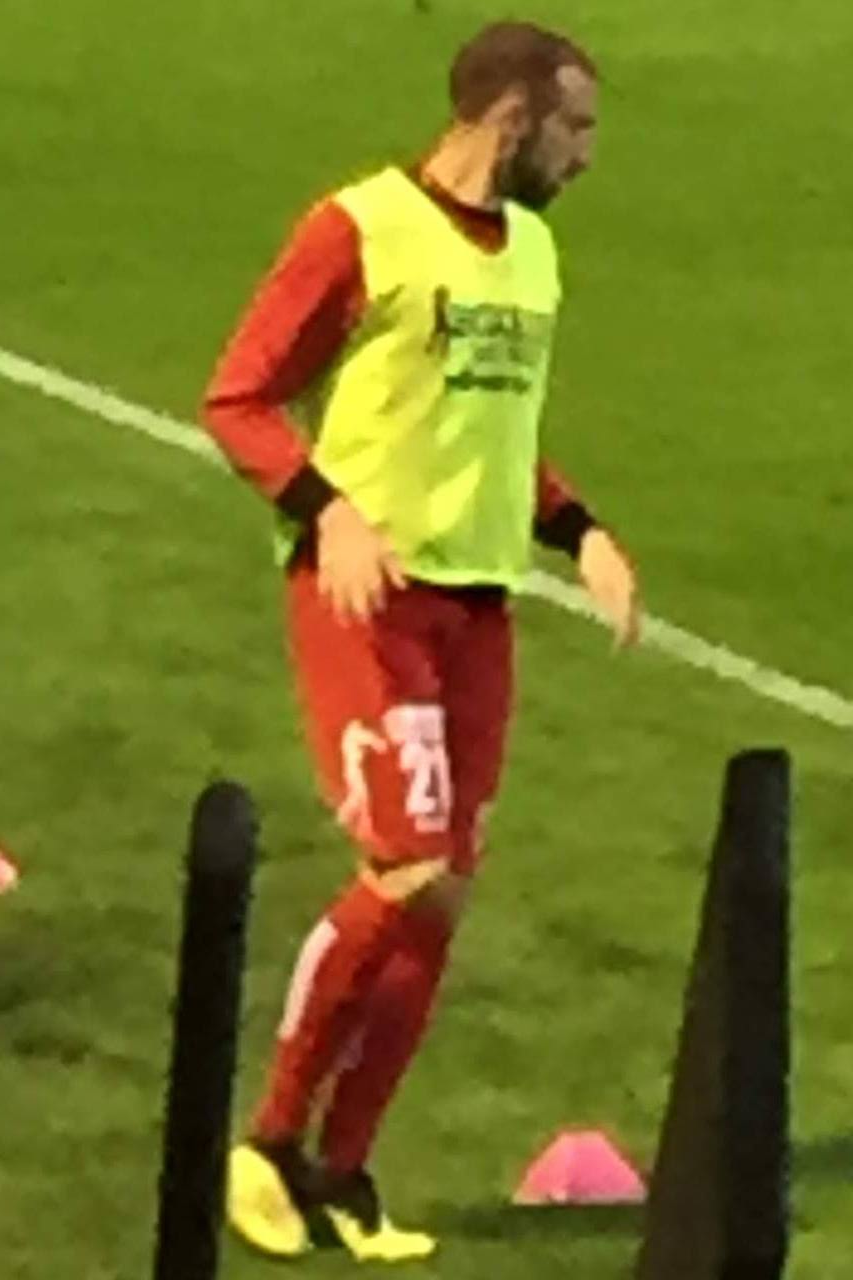
- Bearzotti for Monza in 2019

Personal information
- Date of birth: 29 October 1996 (age 30)
- Place of birth: Palmanova, Italy
- Height: 1.80 m (5 ft 11 in)
- Position: Forward

Team information
- Current team: Brian Lignano

Youth career
- 2014–2015: Verona

Senior career*
Years	Team	Apps	(Gls)
2013–2014	Pordenone	23	(4)
2014–2019	Verona	6	(0)
2015–2016	→ Padova (loan)	15	(0)
2016–2017	→ Arezzo (loan)	27	(4)
2018–2019	→ Cosenza (loan)	1	(0)
2019	→ Monza (loan)	13	(0)
2019–2021	Modena	49	(1)
2021–2022	Catanzaro	13	(0)
2022	→ Trento (loan)	17	(0)
2023	Siena	5	(0)
2024–	Brian Lignano	13	(2)
- * Club domestic league appearances and goals as of 10 November 2024

Enrico Bearzotti (born 29 October 1996) is an Italian football player who plays for Serie D club Brian Lignano.

== Club career ==
He made his Serie C debut for Padova on 6 September 2015 in a game against Reggiana.

On 5 January 2019, he joined Monza on loan.

For the 2019–20 season, he joined Modena.

On 30 July 2021, he signed a two-year contract with Catanzaro. On 4 January 2022, he joined Trento on loan.

On 3 February 2023, Bearzotti signed with Siena.
