= Matteo Pinton =

Italian footballer

Personal information
- Date of birth: 9 August 1998 (age 28)
- Place of birth: Padua, Italy
- Height: 1.75 m (5 ft 9 in)
- Position: Defender

Team information
- Current team: Mestre
- Number: 98

Youth career
- –2014: Padova
- 2014–2016: Hellas Verona

Senior career*
Years	Team	Apps	(Gls)
2016–2020	Hellas Verona	0	(0)
2016–2017	→ Mestre (loan)	22	(1)
2017–2018	→ Union Feltre (loan)	29	(2)
2018–2020	→ Virtus Verona (loan)	23	(0)
2020–2023	Mantova	52	(0)
2023–2024	Mestre	32	(3)
2024–2025	Adriese	29	(0)
2025–2026	Este	18	(1)
2026–	Mestre	4	(0)
- * Club domestic league appearances and goals as of 22 February 2026

Matteo Pinton (born 9 August 1998) is an Italian footballer who plays as a defender for Serie D club Mestre.

== Club career ==
He began his senior career with loans to Serie D clubs Mestre and Union Feltre.

On 5 July 2018, he joined Serie C club Virtus Verona on loan. He made his Serie C debut for Virtus Verona on 21 October 2018 in a game against Giana Erminio, as a 68th-minute substitute for Jacopo Rossi.

On 17 August 2020, he joined Mantova.
