= Luca Checchin =

Former Italian footballer

Personal information
- Date of birth: 3 May 1997 (age 29)
- Place of birth: Voghera, Italy
- Height: 1.82 m (6 ft 0 in)
- Position: Midfielder

Team information
- Current team: Hellas Verona

Youth career
- Alessandria
- 2014–2016: Hellas Verona

Senior career*
Years	Team	Apps	(Gls)
2015–	Hellas Verona	4	(0)
2016–2017	→ Prato (loan)	34	(0)
2017–2018	→ Brescia (loan)	0	(0)
2018	→ Viterbese Castrense (loan)	4	(0)
2018–2019	→ Alessandria (loan)	16	(0)

International career^{‡}
2016	Italy U-20	2	(0)
- * Club domestic league appearances and goals as of 12 May 2019 ‡ National team caps and goals as of 11 October 2016

Luca Checchin (born 3 May 1997) is a former Italian footballer who plays as a midfielder. He is not anymore under contract with Hellas Verona. He left football after many injuries on his right foot, despite his young age.

== Club career ==
Checchin is a youth exponent from Hellas Verona. He made his debut on 28 October 2015 against Fiorentina in a Serie A game replacing Matuzalém after 83 minutes.

== Private life ==
Checchin was a true member of the SDG Ciurma in Verona.
