= Simone Calvano =

Italian footballer (born 1993)

Personal information
- Date of birth: 7 November 1993 (age 33)
- Place of birth: Milan, Italy
- Height: 1.83 m (6 ft 0 in)
- Position: Midfielder

Team information
- Current team: Monopoli
- Number: 17

Youth career
- 2005–2010: Atalanta
- 2010–2012: AC Milan

Senior career*
Years	Team	Apps	(Gls)
2012–2014	Hellas Verona	0	(0)
2013	→ San Marino (loan)	9	(0)
2013–2014	→ Lanciano (loan)	0	(0)
2014	AlbinoLeffe	11	(2)
2014–2020	Hellas Verona	18	(0)
2014–2015	→ Pistoiese (loan)	35	(2)
2015	→ Teramo (loan)	12	(0)
2016	→ Tuttocuoio (loan)	15	(0)
2016–2017	→ Reggiana (loan)	28	(0)
2019	→ Padova (loan)	13	(0)
2019–2020	→ Juve Stabia (loan)	18	(1)
2020–2022	Triestina	49	(2)
2022–2023	Pro Vercelli	31	(1)
2023–2024	Taranto	35	(1)
2024–	Monopoli	12	(2)
2025–2026	→ Crotone (loan)	17	(0)

International career
2008–2009	Italy U16	6	(0)
2009–2010	Italy U17	3	(0)
2010–2011	Italy U18	2	(0)
2011–2012	Italy U19	1	(0)
- * Club domestic league appearances and goals as of 29 August 2026

Simone Calvano (born 11 July 1993) is an Italian professional footballer who plays as a defensive and central midfielder for Serie C Group C club Monopoli.

== Club career ==
=== Early career ===
Calvano joined AC Milan from Atalanta in January 2010. He spent two seasons and a half in the club's under-20 team, being part of the squad who won the Coppa Italia Primavera in 2010, 25 years after the team's last success in the competition.

Calvano made his official debut for the first team on 26 January 2012, coming on as a substitute in a Coppa Italia quarter-finals game against Lazio, which Milan won 3–1.

=== Hellas Verona ===
At the beginning of the 2012–13 season, Calvano was signed by Serie B club Hellas Verona on a loan deal with an option for the co-ownership. During the January transfer window, Verona redeemed the player's co-ownership and sent him on loan to Prima Divisione club San Marino for the remainder of the season.

On 12 January 2019, he joined Padova on loan.

On 26 August 2019, he joined Juve Stabia on loan with an option to buy.

=== Serie C ===
On 5 October 2020 he signed a two-year contract with Serie C club Triestina.

On 11 August 2022, Calvano moved to Pro Vercelli on a two-year deal.

On 27 July 2023, Calvano signed a two-year contract with Taranto.

On 5 August 2024, Calvano moved to Monopoli on a two-year contract, with an optional third year.

== International career ==
Calvano has made up a total of 12 caps with Italy U-16, Italy U-17, Italy U-18 and Italy U-19 since October 2008.

== Career statistics ==
=== Club ===
As of match played 28 August 2021

Appearances and goals by club, season and competition
Club	Season	League			National Cup		League Cup		Other		Total	
Club	Season	Division	Apps	Goals	Apps	Goals	Apps	Goals	Apps	Goals	Apps	Goals
AC Milan	2011–12	Serie A	0	0	1	0	—		—		1	0
Verona	2012–13	Serie B	0	0	0	0	—		—		0	0
San Marino (loan)	2012–13	Lega Pro	9	0	0	0	—		—		9	0
Lanciano (loan)	2013–14	Serie B	0	0	0	0	—		—		0	0
AlbinoLeffe	2013–14	Lega Pro	11	2	0	0	—		1 (Note: Appearance(s) in Promotion Playoffs)	0	12	2
Hellas Verona	2017–18	Serie A	15	0	1	0	—		—		16	0
Hellas Verona	2018–19	Serie B	3	0	0	0	—		—		3	0
Hellas Verona	Total		18	0	1	0	0	0	0	0	19	0
Pistoiese (loan)	2014–15	Lega Pro	35	2	0	0	2	0	—		37	2
Teramo (loan)	2015–16	Lega Pro	12	0	1	0	1	0	—		14	0
Tuttocuoio (loan)	2015–16	Serie C	15	0	0	0	—		—		15	0
Reggiana (loan)	2016–17	Lega Pro	28	0	1	0	—		—		29	0
Padova (loan)	2018–19	Serie B	13	0	0	0	—		—		13	0
Juve Stabia (loan)	2019–20	Serie B	18	1	0	0	—		—		18	1
Triestina	2020–21	Serie C	33	2	0	0	—		1	0	34	2
Triestina	2021–22	Serie C	1	0	0	0	1	0	—		2	0
Triestina	Total		34	2	0	0	1	0	1	0	36	2
Career total			193	7	4	0	4	0	2	0	203	7
