= 2014–15 Hellas Verona FC season =

Hellas Verona
2014–15 season
- President: Maurizio Setti
- Manager: Andrea Mandorlini
- Stadium: Stadio Marc'Antonio Bentegodi
- Serie A: 13th
- Coppa Italia: Round of 16
- Top goalscorer: League: Luca Toni (22); All: Luca Toni (23)
- Highest home attendance: 27,155 vs Milan, Serie A, 19 October 2014
- Lowest home attendance: 3,957 vs Perugia, Coppa Italia, 2 December 2014
- Average home league attendance: 19,299
Home colours	Away colours	Third colours

The 2014–15 season was Hellas Verona Football Club's second consecutive season in Serie A, after being promoted at the end of the 2012–13 Serie B season. The club competed in Serie A, finishing 13th (three places below the previous season's 10th-place finish), and in the Coppa Italia, where they were eliminated in the Round of 16.

== Players ==
=== Squad information ===
As of 8 March 2015

Note: Flags indicate national team as defined under FIFA eligibility rules; some limited exceptions apply. Players may hold more than one non-FIFA nationality.

No.	Pos.	Nation	Player
1	GK	BRA	Rafael
2	DF	URU	Guillermo Rodríguez
3	DF	ITA	Eros Pisano (on loan from Palermo)
4	DF	MEX	Rafael Márquez
5	DF	DEN	Frederik Sørensen (on loan from Juventus)
7	FW	ARG	Javier Saviola
8	MF	MAR	Mounir Obbadi (on loan from Monaco)
9	FW	ITA	Luca Toni (captain)
10	MF	ISL	Emil Hallfreðsson
11	MF	SRB	Boško Janković
14	FW	ITA	Pierluigi Cappelluzzo
15	MF	ITA	Luca Checchin
16	FW	ITA	Nicola Benedetti
17	FW	URU	Nicolás López (on loan from Udinese)
18	DF	GRE	Vangelis Moras

No.	Pos.	Nation	Player
19	MF	ITA	Leandro Greco
20	MF	GRE	Lazaros Christodoulopoulos
21	FW	ARG	Juanito
22	GK	ITA	Francesco Benussi
23	MF	MDA	Artur Ioniță
25	DF	BRA	Rafael Marques
26	MF	ITA	Jacopo Sala
27	MF	ITA	Mattia Valoti (on loan from AlbinoLeffe)
28	DF	ITA	Davide Brivio (on loan from Atalanta)
30	MF	BRA	Gustavo Campanharo (on loan from Bragantino)
33	DF	ITA	Alessandro Agostini
70	FW	BRA	Fernandinho (on loan from Grêmio)
71	DF	CRO	Ivan Martić
77	MF	GRE	Panagiotis Tachtsidis (on loan from Genoa)
88	FW	ALG	Mohamed Fares
95	GK	ITA	Pierluigi Gollini

== Competitions ==
=== Serie A ===
==== League table ====
Pos	Team	Pld	W	D	L	GF	GA	GD	Pts
11	Palermo	38	12	13	13	53	55	−2	49 (Note: Palermo finished ahead of Sassuolo on head-to-head away goals scored: Palermo 2-1 Sassuolo, Sassuolo 0-0 Palermo.)
12	Sassuolo	38	12	13	13	49	57	−8	49
13	Hellas Verona	38	11	13	14	49	65	−16	46
14	Chievo	38	10	13	15	28	41	−13	43
15	Empoli	38	8	18	12	46	52	−6	42

Source: 2014–15 Serie A, 2014-15 Serie A classification.
Rules for classification: 1) points; 2) head-to-head points; 3) head-to-head goal difference; 4) goal difference; 5) number of goals scored; 6) draw. (Head-to-head record is applied for clubs with the same number of points only once all matches between said clubs have been played.).

==== Results summary ====
Overall								Home						Away					
Pld	W	D	L	GF	GA	GD	Pts	W	D	L	GF	GA	GD	W	D	L	GF	GA	GD
38	11	13	14	49	65	−16	46	7	5	7	27	30	−3	4	8	7	22	35	−13

Last updated: 31 May 2015.
Source: Competitive matches

==== Results by round ====
Round	1	2	3	4	5	6	7	8	9	10	11	12	13	14	15	16	17	18	19	20	21	22	23	24	25	26	27	28	29	30	31	32	33	34	35	36	37	38
Ground	A	H	A	H	A	H	H	A	H	A	A	H	A	H	A	H	A	H	A	H	A	H	A	H	A	A	H	A	H	H	A	H	A	H	A	H	A	H
Result	D	W	W	D	L	W	L	L	D	D	D	L	L	L	W	L	D	W	L	W	L	L	L	D	W	D	W	L	D	L	W	W	D	L	D	W	D	D
Position	14	7	3	6	7	6	8	10	11	11	10	12	14	15	15	15	15	13	14	14	14	14	16	15	15	15	14	16	15	16	14	12	13	15	14	12	13	13

Updated to match(es) played on 31 May 2015. Source: Competitive matches
A = Away; H = Home; W = Win; D = Draw; L = Loss

==== Matches ====
31 August 2014 1	Atalanta	0–0	Hellas Verona	Bergamo
18:00 CEST (UTC+02:00)	Dramé (yellow card) 84'; Boakye (yellow card) 86'	Report	Hallfreðsson (yellow card) 35'; Christodoulopoulos (yellow card) 70'; Ioniță (yellow card) 85'	Stadium: Stadio Atleti Azzurri d'Italia; Attendance: 14,925; Referee: Nicola Rizzoli

15 September 2014 2	Hellas Verona	2–1	Palermo	Verona
20:45 CEST (UTC+02:00)	Toni 41' (pen.); Agostini (yellow card) 43'; Hallfreðsson (yellow card) 73'; Márquez (yellow card) 73'; Pisano 78' (o.g.); Obbadi (yellow card) 90+2'	Report	Vázquez 18'; Daprelà (yellow card) 24'; Feddal (yellow card) 32'	Stadium: Stadio Marc'Antonio Bentegodi; Attendance: 18,304; Referee: Gianluca Rocchi

21 September 2014 3	Torino	0–1	Hellas Verona	Turin
20:45 CEST (UTC+02:00)	Bovo (yellow card) 60'; El Kaddouri (yellow card) 65'; Peres (yellow card) 82'	Report	Ioniță 66'; López (yellow card) 80'; Márquez (yellow card) 85'	Stadium: Stadio Olimpico di Torino; Attendance: 13,405; Referee: Luca Banti

24 September 2014 4	Hellas Verona	2–2	Genoa	Verona
20:45 CEST (UTC+02:00)	Tachtsidis (yellow card) 45', (goal) 52'; Márquez (yellow card) 55'; Ioniță 64'	Report	Falque (yellow card) 25'; Matri 34', 47'; Sturaro (yellow card) 54'	Stadium: Stadio Marc'Antonio Bentegodi; Attendance: 16,785; Referee: Dino Tommasi

27 September 2014 5	Roma	2–0	Hellas Verona	Rome
18:00 CEST (UTC+02:00)	Manolas (yellow card) 45'; Florenzi 75'; Destro 86'	Report	Nenê (yellow card) 38'	Stadium: Stadio Olimpico; Attendance: 40,432; Referee: Carmine Russo

4 October 2014 6	Hellas Verona	1–0	Cagliari	Verona
18:00 CEST (UTC+02:00)	Tachtsidis (yellow card) 81', (goal) 89'	Report	Dessena (yellow card) 46'; Ibarbo (yellow card) 49'; Rossettini (yellow card) 52'	Stadium: Stadio Marc'Antonio Bentegodi; Attendance: 17,813; Referee: Piero Giacomelli

19 October 2014 7	Hellas Verona	1–3	Milan	Verona
15:00 CEST (UTC+02:00)	Agostini (yellow card) 29'; Márquez (yellow card) 72' (yellow-red card) 90+3'; López 87'; Tachtsidis (yellow card) 90+2'	Report	Marques 21' (o.g.); Honda 27', 56', (yellow card) 83'	Stadium: Stadio Marc'Antonio Bentegodi; Attendance: 27,125; Referee: Paolo Valeri

26 October 2014 8	Napoli	6–2	Hellas Verona	Naples
18:00 CET (UTC+01:00)	Jorginho (yellow card) 24'; Hamšík 44', 58'; Higuaín 68', 84', 90+1' (pen.); Callejón 76'	Report	Hallfreðsson 1'; Ioniță (yellow card) 55'; López 66'	Stadium: Stadio San Paolo; Attendance: 25,992; Referee: Andrea Gervasoni

30 October 2014 9	Hellas Verona	1–1	Lazio	Verona
20:45 CET (UTC+01:00)	Martić (yellow card) 26'; Toni 69' (pen.); Campanharo (yellow card) 88'	Report	Onazi (yellow card) 22'; Lulić 42'; Cavanda (yellow card) 49' (yellow-red card) 68'; Biglia (yellow card) 77'	Stadium: Stadio Marc'Antonio Bentegodi; Attendance: 17,760; Referee: Massimiliano Irrati

2 November 2014 10	Cesena	1–1	Hellas Verona	Cesena
19:00 CET (UTC+01:00)	Defrel 22', (yellow card) 61'	Report	Ioniță (yellow card) 10'; Hallfreðsson (yellow card) 39'; Tachtsidis (yellow card) 60'; Juanito 77', (yellow card) 87'	Stadium: Stadio Dino Manuzzi; Attendance: 15,375; Referee: Gianpaolo Calvarese

9 November 2014 11	Internazionale	2–2	Hellas Verona	Milan
20:45 CET (UTC+01:00)	Icardi 18', 48'; Medel (yellow card) 44' (yellow-red card) 51'	Report	Toni 10'; Martić (yellow card) 57'; Moras (yellow card) 71'; López 89'	Stadium: San Siro; Attendance: 27,314; Referee: Gianluca Rocchi

23 November 2014 12	Hellas Verona	1–2	Fiorentina	Verona
15:00 CET (UTC+01:00)	Campanharo (yellow card) 26'; López 39'; Christodoulopoulos (yellow card) 87'	Report	Gonzalo 16'; Pizarro (yellow card) 36'; Neto (yellow card) 40'; Valero (yellow card) 42'; Cuadrado 62'; Basanta (yellow card) 80'	Stadium: Stadio Marc'Antonio Bentegodi; Attendance: 21,553; Referee: Marco Di Bello

29 November 2014 13	Sassuolo	2–1	Hellas Verona	Reggio Emilia
18:00 CET (UTC+01:00)	Taïder (yellow card) 32', (goal) 77'; Sansone 50'; Berardi (yellow card) 59'; Floro Flores (yellow card) 73'; Magnanelli (yellow card) 76'	Report	Moras 7'; Hallfreðsson (yellow card) 31'; López (yellow card) 64'; Campanharo (yellow card) 70'	Stadium: Mapei Stadium – Città del Tricolore; Attendance: 12,234; Referee: Daniele Doveri

8 December 2014 14	Hellas Verona	1–3	Sampdoria	Verona
21:00 CET (UTC+01:00)	Márquez (red card) 26'; Toni 37'; Agostini (yellow card) 46'; Valoti (yellow card) 86'	Report	Éder 28' (pen.); Silvestre (yellow card) 35'; Duncan (yellow card) 43'; Okaka 57'; Gabbiadini 62'; De Silvestri (yellow card) 64'	Stadium: Stadio Marc'Antonio Bentegodi; Attendance: 18,390; Referee: Dino Tommasi

14 December 2014 15	Udinese	1–2	Hellas Verona	Udine
15:00 CET (UTC+01:00)	Di Natale 31', (yellow card) 90+1'; Allan (yellow card) 90'	Report	Agostini (yellow card) 6'; Toni 45+1'; Christodoulopoulos 46'; Tachtsidis (yellow card) 87'; González (yellow card) 89'; Valoti (yellow card) 90'; Benussi (yellow card) 90+4'	Stadium: Stadio Friuli; Attendance: 8,247; Referee: Sebastiano Peruzzo

21 December 2014 16	Hellas Verona	0–1	Chievo	Verona
12:30 CET (UTC+01:00)	Martić (yellow card) 27'; Tachtsidis (yellow card) 43'; Márquez (yellow card) 44'	Report	Radovanović (yellow card) 43'; Paloschi 81', (yellow card) 90+2'	Stadium: Stadio Marc'Antonio Bentegodi; Attendance: 22,927; Referee: Andrea Gervasoni

6 January 2015 17	Empoli	0–0	Hellas Verona	Empoli
15:00 CET (UTC+01:00)	Tonelli (yellow card) 49' (yellow-red card) 65'	Report	Sala (yellow card) 24'; Toni (yellow card) 41'; Campanharo (yellow card) 59'; Hallfreðsson (yellow card) 68' (yellow-red card) 77'	Stadium: Stadio Carlo Castellani; Attendance: 7,705; Referee: Piero Giacomelli

11 January 2015 18	Hellas Verona	3–1	Parma	Verona
15:00 CET (UTC+01:00)	Sala 39'; Toni 72'; Valoti (yellow card) 75', (goal) 90+1'	Report	Lodi 63'	Stadium: Stadio Marc'Antonio Bentegodi; Attendance: 15,915; Referee: Claudio Gavillucci

18 January 2015 19	Juventus	4–0	Hellas Verona	Turin
20:45 CET (UTC+01:00)	Pogba 3'; Tevez 7', 74'; Pereyra 66'	Report	Greco (yellow card) 47'; Rodríguez (yellow card) 79'	Stadium: Juventus Stadium; Attendance: 36,243; Referee: Massimiliano Irrati

25 January 2015 20	Hellas Verona	1–0	Atalanta	Verona
15:00 CET (UTC+01:00)	Sørensen (yellow card) 15'; Saviola 53'; Hallfreðsson (yellow card) 86'	Report	Denis (yellow card) 12'; Baselli (yellow card) 90+1'	Stadium: Stadio Marc'Antonio Bentegodi; Attendance: 16,857; Referee: Daniele Doveri

1 February 2015 21	Palermo	2–1	Hellas Verona	Palermo
15:00 CET (UTC+01:00)	Dybala 18'; Belotti 79'; Anđelković (yellow card) 83'	Report	Tachtsidis 8'; Marques (yellow card) 19'; Saviola (yellow card) 90+1'	Stadium: Stadio Renzo Barbera; Attendance: 14,058; Referee: Dino Tommasi

7 February 2015 22	Hellas Verona	1–3	Torino	Verona
18:00 CET (UTC+01:00)	Marques (yellow card) 49'; Toni 83'	Report	Glik (yellow card) 23'; Martínez 32'; Bovo (yellow card) 38'; Quagliarella 50' (pen.); Padelli (yellow card) 90'; El Kaddouri 90+2'	Stadium: Stadio Marc'Antonio Bentegodi; Attendance: 17,038; Referee: Michael Fabbri

15 February 2015 23	Genoa	5–2	Hellas Verona	Genoa
15:00 CET (UTC+01:00)	Agostini 10' (o.g.); Niang 12', 30'; Kucka (yellow card) 63'; Bertolacci 65'; Laxalt (yellow card) 73'; Perotti 86'	Report	Toni 20', 57'; Tachtsidis (yellow card) 25'; Greco (yellow card) 44'; Sørensen (yellow card) 50'; Pisano (yellow card) 81'	Stadium: Stadio Luigi Ferraris; Attendance: 17,823; Referee: Antonio Damato

22 February 2015 24	Hellas Verona	1–1	Roma	Verona
15:00 CET (UTC+01:00)	Janković (yellow card) 2', (goal) 38'; Juanito (yellow card) 69'	Report	Totti 26'; Cole (yellow card) 68'; Manolas (yellow card) 86'; Nainggolan (yellow card) 87'	Stadium: Stadio Marc'Antonio Bentegodi; Attendance: 17,953; Referee: Andrea Gervasoni

1 March 2015 25	Cagliari	1–2	Hellas Verona	Cagliari
12:30 CET (UTC+01:00)	Murru (yellow card) 45+1'; Conti (yellow card) 54', (goal) 90'; João Pedro (yellow card) 58'	Report	Toni 9'; Juanito 56', (yellow card) 90+4'; Pisano (yellow card) 67'; Greco (yellow card) 90'	Stadium: Stadio Sant'Elia; Attendance: 14,000; Referee: Paolo Valeri

7 March 2015 26	Milan	2–2	Hellas Verona	Milan
20:45 CET (UTC+01:00)	Poli (yellow card) 22'; Ménez 41' (pen.); Tachtsidis 47' (o.g.)	Report	Toni 18' (pen.); Ioniță (yellow card) 31'; Hallfreðsson (yellow card) 59'; López 90+5', (yellow card) 90+5'	Stadium: San Siro; Attendance: 29,510; Referee: Piero Giacomelli

15 March 2015 27	Hellas Verona	2–0	Napoli	Verona
18:00 CET (UTC+01:00)	Toni 7', 51', (yellow card) 90+4'; Sala (yellow card) 26' (yellow-red card) 89'; Juanito (yellow card) 44'; Obbadi (yellow card) 71'; Tachtsidis (yellow card) 72'; Christodoulopoulos (yellow card) 79'	Report	Ghoulam (yellow card) 9'; Mesto (yellow card) 52'; Albiol (yellow card) 57'; Gabbiadini (yellow card) 89'; Britos (yellow card) 90+4'	Stadium: Stadio Marc'Antonio Bentegodi; Attendance: 22,468; Referee: Luca Banti

22 March 2015 28	Lazio	2–0	Hellas Verona	Rome
20:45 CET (UTC+01:00)	Anderson 4'; Candreva 45+2'	Report	Rodríguez (yellow card) 45+1'	Stadium: Stadio Olimpico; Attendance: 40,119; Referee: Davide Massa

4 April 2015 29	Hellas Verona	3–3	Cesena	Verona
15:00 CEST (UTC+02:00)	Toni 3', 62'; Janković (yellow card) 20'; Hallfreðsson (yellow card) 26'; Juanito 30'; Rodríguez (yellow card) 76'	Report	Pulzetti (yellow card) 32'; Kranjc (yellow card) 50'; Carbonero 70'; Brienza 77'; Succi (yellow card) 80', (goal) 81'	Stadium: Stadio Marc'Antonio Bentegodi; Attendance: 17,590; Referee: Daniele Orsato

11 April 2015 30	Hellas Verona	0–3	Internazionale	Verona
20:45 CEST (UTC+02:00)	Moras (yellow card) 36'; Obbadi (yellow card) 56'	Report	Icardi 11'; Juan (yellow card) 18'; Brozović (yellow card) 38'; Guarín (yellow card) 40'; Palacio 48'; Vidić (yellow card) 76'; Moras 90+2' (o.g.)	Stadium: Stadio Marc'Antonio Bentegodi; Attendance: 20,645; Referee: Paolo Tagliavento

20 April 2015 31	Fiorentina	0–1	Hellas Verona	Florence
20:45 CEST (UTC+02:00)	Iličić (yellow card) 10'; Rosi (yellow card) 68'	Report	Juanito (yellow card) 36'; Janković (yellow card) 38'; Sala (yellow card) 61'; Rafael (yellow card) 66'; Pisano (yellow card) 88'; Obbadi 90'	Stadium: Stadio Artemio Franchi; Attendance: 27,094; Referee: Paolo Mazzoleni

26 April 2015 32	Hellas Verona	3–2	Sassuolo	Verona
15:00 CEST (UTC+02:00)	Rafael (red card) 17'; Greco (yellow card) 25'; Juanito 30'; Toni 63', 70'; Moras (yellow card) 90'; Obbadi (yellow card) 90+3'	Report	Moras 35' (o.g.); Berardi (yellow card) 76'; Cannavaro (yellow card) 76'; Floro Flores 89'	Stadium: Stadio Marc'Antonio Bentegodi; Attendance: 18,375; Referee: Daniele Chiffi

29 April 2015 33	Sampdoria	1–1	Hellas Verona	Genoa
20:45 CEST (UTC+02:00)	Acquah (yellow card) 36' (yellow-red card) 57'; De Silvestri 65'; Muñoz (yellow card) 80'; Obiang (yellow card) 80'	Report	Valoti (yellow card) 16'; Sørensen (yellow card) 24'; Toni 68'; Brivio (yellow card) 82'; Rodríguez (yellow card) 89'	Stadium: Stadio Luigi Ferraris; Attendance: 19,609; Referee: Massimiliano Irrati

3 May 2015 34	Hellas Verona	0–1	Udinese	Verona
15:00 CEST (UTC+02:00)	Greco (yellow card) 34'; Sala (red card) 61'; Márquez (red card) 90+1'	Report	Perica (yellow card) 30'; Allan (yellow card) 51'; Piris (yellow card) 54'; Di Natale 62'; Bubnjić (yellow card) 66'	Stadium: Stadio Marc'Antonio Bentegodi; Attendance: 17,418; Referee: Angelo Cervellera

10 May 2015 35	Chievo	2–2	Hellas Verona	Verona
12:30 CEST (UTC+02:00)	Hetemaj (yellow card) 3'; Paloschi 9'; Schelotto (yellow card) 19'; Pellissier 40' (pen.); Cesar (yellow card) 85'	Report	Janković (yellow card) 3'; Obbadi (yellow card) 5'; Juanito 20', (yellow card) 28'; Toni (yellow card) 21', (goal) 26'; Tachtsidis (yellow card) 76'	Stadium: Stadio Marc'Antonio Bentegodi; Attendance: 20,000; Referee: Nicola Rizzoli

17 May 2015 36	Hellas Verona	2–1	Empoli	Verona
15:00 CEST (UTC+02:00)	Moras 24'; Fernandinho (yellow card) 66'; Sala 67'	Report	Saponara 6'; Croce (yellow card) 83'; Verdi (yellow card) 90'	Stadium: Stadio Marc'Antonio Bentegodi; Attendance: 18,588; Referee: Federico La Penna

24 May 2015 37	Parma	2–2	Hellas Verona	Parma
15:00 CEST (UTC+02:00)	Nocerino 21'; Varela 36'; Lila (yellow card) 90'	Report	Obbadi (yellow card) 41'; Toni 42', 80' (pen.); Moras (yellow card) 51'	Stadium: Stadio Ennio Tardini; Attendance: 11,889; Referee: Daniele Minelli

30 May 2015 38	Hellas Verona	2–2	Juventus	Verona
18:00 CEST (UTC+02:00)	Tachtsidis (yellow card) 37'; Toni 48'; Juanito (yellow card) 65', (goal) 90+3'; Márquez (yellow card) 87'	Report	Tevez (yellow card) 31'; Pereyra 42'; Llorente 57'; Pepe (red card) 90+2'	Stadium: Stadio Marc'Antonio Bentegodi; Attendance: 23,149; Referee: Marco Di Bello

=== Coppa Italia ===
24 August 2014 Third round	Verona	3–0	Cremonese	Verona
20:30 CEST (UTC+02:00)	Toni 50'; Moras 60'; Christodoulopoulos 67'			Stadium: Stadio Marc'Antonio Bentegodi; Attendance: 11,209; Referee: Dino Tommasi

2 December 2014 Fourth round	Verona	1–0	Perugia	Verona
21:00 CET (UTC+01:00)	Saviola 17' (pen.); Hallfreðsson (yellow card) 59'; Campanharo (yellow card) 63'	Report	Giacomazzi (yellow card) 35' (yellow-red card) 53'; Lanzafame (yellow card) 49'	Stadium: Stadio Marc'Antonio Bentegodi; Attendance: 3,957; Referee: Angelo Cervellera

15 January 2015 Round of 16	Juventus	6–1	Verona	Turin
21:00 CET (UTC+01:00)	Giovinco 5', 45+1'; Pereyra 21'; Pogba 53'; Morata 63' (pen.); Coman 79'	Report	Nenê (yellow card) 22', (goal) 57'; Rodríguez (yellow card) 42'	Stadium: Juventus Stadium; Attendance: 39,302; Referee: Gianpaolo Calvarese

== Statistics ==
=== Appearances and goals ===
No.	Pos	Nat	Player	Total		Serie A		Coppa Italia	
No.	Pos	Nat	Player	Apps	Goals	Apps	Goals	Apps	Goals
Goalkeepers
1	GK	(Brazil) BRA	Rafael	20	0	20	0	0	0
22	GK	(Italy) ITA	Francesco Benussi	16	0	15+1	0	0	0
95	GK	(Italy) ITA	Pierluigi Gollini	3	0	3	0	0	0
Defenders
2	DF	(Uruguay) URU	Guillermo Rodríguez	13	0	11+2	0	0	0
3	DF	(Italy) ITA	Eros Pisano	19	0	19	0	0	0
4	DF	(Mexico) MEX	Rafael Márquez	27	0	27	0	0	0
5	DF	(Denmark) DEN	Frederik Sørensen	10	0	6+4	0	0	0
18	DF	(Greece) GRE	Vangelis Moras	35	2	35	2	0	0
25	DF	(Brazil) BRA	Rafael Marques	18	0	14+4	0	0	0
28	DF	(Italy) ITA	Davide Brivio	13	0	12+1	0	0	0
33	DF	(Italy) ITA	Alessandro Agostini	22	0	21+1	0	0	0
71	DF	(Croatia) CRO	Ivan Martić	16	0	13+3	0	0	0
Midfielders
8	MF	(Morocco) MAR	Mounir Obbadi	22	1	14+8	1	0	0
10	MF	(Iceland) ISL	Emil Hallfreðsson	28	1	26+2	1	0	0
11	MF	(Serbia) SRB	Boško Janković	18	1	17+1	1	0	0
19	MF	(Italy) ITA	Leandro Greco	18	0	13+5	0	0	0
20	MF	(Greece) GRE	Lazaros Christodoulopoulos	22	1	12+10	1	0	0
23	MF	(Moldova) MDA	Artur Ioniță	18	2	13+5	2	0	0
26	MF	(Italy) ITA	Jacopo Sala	16	2	16	2	0	0
27	MF	(Italy) ITA	Mattia Valoti	10	1	1+9	1	0	0
30	MF	(Brazil) BRA	Gustavo Campanharo	15	0	4+11	0	0	0
77	MF	(Greece) GRE	Panagiotis Tachtsidis	34	3	34	3	0	0
Forwards
7	FW	(Argentina) ARG	Javier Saviola	15	1	4+11	1	0	0
9	FW	(Italy) ITA	Luca Toni	38	22	36+2	22	0	0
17	FW	(Uruguay) URU	Nicolás López	24	5	10+14	5	0	0
21	FW	(Argentina) ARG	Juanito	27	6	21+6	6	0	0
70	FW	(Brazil) BRA	Fernandinho	6	0	1+5	0	0	0
85	FW	(Algeria) ALG	Mohamed Fares	1	0	0+1	0	0	0
Players transferred out during the season
40	DF	(Uruguay) URU	Alejandro González	5	0	5	0	0	0
99	FW	(Brazil) BRA	Nenê	8	0	1+7	0	0	0

Last updated: 16 June 2015
Source: Competitions
