= 2013–14 Hellas Verona FC season =

Hellas Verona
2013–14 season
- President: Maurizio Setti
- Manager: Andrea Mandorlini
- Stadium: Stadio Marc'Antonio Bentegodi
- Serie A: 10th
- Coppa Italia: Fourth round
- Top goalscorer: League: Luca Toni (20); All: Luca Toni (21)
- Average home league attendance: 21,172
Home colours	Away colours	Third colours

The 2013–14 season was Hellas Verona Football Club's first season in Serie A in eleven years. The club finished 10th in Serie A, and were eliminated in the fourth round of the Coppa Italia.

== Players ==
=== Squad information ===
As of 2 September 2013.

Note: Flags indicate national team as defined under FIFA eligibility rules; some limited exceptions apply. Players may hold more than one non-FIFA nationality.

No.	Pos.	Nation	Player
1	GK	BRA	Rafael
2	MF	BRA	Rômulo (on loan from Fiorentina)
3	DF	ITA	Michelangelo Albertazzi
4	MF	ITA	Simon Laner
5	MF	ITA	Massimo Donati
6	MF	BRA	Raphael Martinho
7	FW	ITA	Samuele Longo (on loan from Inter)
8	FW	ITA	Daniele Cacia
9	FW	ITA	Luca Toni
10	MF	ISL	Emil Hallfreðsson
11	MF	SRB	Boško Janković
12	GK	BRA	Nícolas
13	DF	ITA	Matteo Bianchetti
14	MF	ARG	Ezequiel Cirigliano (on loan from (Argentina) River Plate)

No.	Pos.	Nation	Player
15	FW	ARG	Juan Iturbe (on loan from (Portugal) Porto)
16	DF	ITA	Matteo Rubin (on loan from Siena)
18	DF	GRE	Vangelis Moras
19	MF	ITA	Jorginho
21	FW	ARG	Juanito
22	DF	ITA	Domenico Maietta (captain)
23	DF	URU	Alejandro González
24	DF	BRA	Rafael Marques
26	MF	ITA	Jacopo Sala
29	DF	ITA	Fabrizio Cacciatore
30	MF	ITA	Marco Donadel (on loan from Napoli)
31	GK	BUL	Nikolay Mihaylov
32	FW	ITA	Daniele Ragatzu
33	DF	ITA	Alessandro Agostini

== Competitions ==
=== Serie A ===
==== League table ====
Pos	Team	Pld	W	D	L	GF	GA	GD	Pts
8	Milan	38	16	9	13	57	49	+8	57 (Note: Torino finished ahead of Milan on goal difference : Torino 2-2 Milan, Milan 1-1 Torino; Torino = +10, Milan = +8.)
9	Lazio	38	15	11	12	54	54	0	56
10	Hellas Verona	38	16	6	16	62	68	−6	54
11	Atalanta	38	15	5	18	43	51	−8	50
12	Sampdoria	38	12	9	17	48	62	−14	45

Source: Serie A, Soccerway
Rules for classification: 1st points; 2nd head-to-head points; 3rd head-to-head goal difference; 4th goal difference; 5th number of goals scored; 6th public draw.
(Head-to-head record is applied for clubs with the same number of points only once all matches between said clubs have been played)

==== Results summary ====
Overall								Home						Away					
Pld	W	D	L	GF	GA	GD	Pts	W	D	L	GF	GA	GD	W	D	L	GF	GA	GD
38	16	6	16	62	68	−6	54	10	3	6	35	28	+7	6	3	10	27	40	−13

Last updated: 18 May 2014.
Source: Competitive matches

==== Results by round ====
Round	1	2	3	4	5	6	7	8	9	10	11	12	13	14	15	16	17	18	19	20	21	22	23	24	25	26	27	28	29	30	31	32	33	34	35	36	37	38
Ground	H	A	H	A	A	H	A	H	A	H	H	A	H	A	H	A	H	A	H	A	H	A	H	H	A	H	A	H	A	A	H	A	H	A	H	A	H	A
Result	W	L	W	L	D	W	W	W	L	W	W	L	L	L	W	D	W	W	L	L	L	W	D	L	W	D	L	L	L	L	W	W	L	W	W	D	D	L
Position	8	13	8	9	10	7	5	4	6	5	5	6	6	6	6	6	6	5	6	6	8	5	6	8	6	7	7	8	9	10	9	9	11	9	8	10	9	10

Updated to match(es) played on 18 May 2014. Source: Competitive matches
A = Away; H = Home; W = Win; D = Draw; L = Loss

==== Matches ====
24 August 2013 1	Hellas Verona	2–1	Milan	Verona
18:00 CEST (UTC+02:00)	Jorginho (yellow card) 20'; Toni 30', 53'; Janković (yellow card) 41'	Report	Poli 15'; Montolivo (yellow card) 26'; Zapata (yellow card) 50'; Balotelli (yellow card) 90'	Stadium: Stadio Marc'Antonio Bentegodi; Attendance: 25,164; Referee: Gianpaolo Calvarese

1 September 2013 2	Roma	3–0	Hellas Verona	Rome
18:00 CEST (UTC+02:00)	Balzaretti (yellow card) 30'; Florenzi (yellow card) 43'; Cacciatore 56' (o.g.); Pjanić 59'; Ljajić 66'	Report	Janković (yellow card) 45+1'; Juanito (yellow card) 68'	Stadium: Stadio Olimpico; Attendance: 39,000; Referee: Piero Giacomelli

15 September 2013 3	Hellas Verona	2–0	Sassuolo	Verona
15:00 CEST (UTC+02:00)	Martinho 12'; Bianchetti (yellow card) 35'; Rômulo (yellow card) 40', (goal) 90+3'; Janković (yellow card) 87'	Report	Gazzola (yellow card) 73'	Stadium: Stadio Marc'Antonio Bentegodi; Attendance: 25,000; Referee: Massimiliano Irrati

22 September 2013 4	Juventus	2–1	Hellas Verona	Turin
15:00 CEST (UTC+02:00)	Tevez 40'; Asamoah (yellow card) 41'; Llorente 45+3'; Ogbonna (yellow card) 49'; Vučinić (yellow card) 86'; Marchisio (yellow card) 88'	Report	Cacciatore 36'; Donadel (yellow card) 87'	Stadium: Juventus Stadium; Attendance: 38,000; Referee: Mauro Bergonzi

25 September 2013 5	Torino	2–2	Hellas Verona	Turin
20:45 CEST (UTC+02:00)	Cerci 36' (pen.), 52', (yellow card) 77'	Report	Juanito 44'; Jorginho 67' (pen.)	Stadium: Stadio Olimpico di Torino; Attendance: 15,000; Referee: Nicola Rizzoli

29 September 2013 6	Hellas Verona	2–1	Livorno	Verona
15:00 CEST (UTC+02:00)	Iturbe 40', (yellow card) 88'; Hallfreðsson (yellow card) 45'; Jorginho 74' (pen.), (yellow card) 75'	Report	Rinaudo 45+1' (yellow card) 73'; Schiattarella (yellow card) 72'	Stadium: Stadio Marc'Antonio Bentegodi; Attendance: 21,000; Referee: Dino Tommasi

6 October 2013 7	Bologna	1–4	Hellas Verona	Bologna
15:00 CEST (UTC+02:00)	Kone (yellow card) 6'; Pérez (yellow card) 44'; Diamanti 52' (pen.)	Report	Cacciatore 22'; Iturbe 29'; González (yellow card) 51'; Toni 56'; Donati (yellow card) 75'; Jorginho 90+3'	Stadium: Stadio Renato Dall'Ara; Attendance: 20,000; Referee: Paolo Valeri

20 October 2013 8	Hellas Verona	3–2	Parma	Verona
15:00 CEST (UTC+02:00)	Cacciatore 9'; Jorginho 61' (pen.), 88' (pen.)	Report	Parolo 19', (yellow card) 27'; Felipe (yellow card) 23'; Cassano 25'; Rosi (yellow card) 30'; Gobbi (yellow card) 48'; Marchionni (yellow card) 50'; Cassani (yellow card) 60'; Acquah (yellow card) 79'	Stadium: Stadio Marc'Antonio Bentegodi; Attendance: 20,000; Referee: Maurizio Mariani

26 October 2013 9	Internazionale	4–2	Hellas Verona	Milan
20:45 CEST (UTC+02:00)	Moras 9' (o.g.); Cambiasso (yellow card) 11', (goal) 38'; Palacio 12', (yellow card) 54'; Rolando 56'; Jonathan (yellow card) 89'; Belfodil (red card) 90+4'	Report	Cacciatore (yellow card) 26'; Martinho 32'; Donadel (yellow card) 68'; Rômulo 71'; Iturbe (yellow card) 90+1'; Moras (red card) 90+4'	Stadium: San Siro; Attendance: 43,097; Referee: Domenico Celi

30 October 2013 10	Hellas Verona	2–0	Sampdoria	Verona
20:45 CET (UTC+01:00)	Juanito 51'; Toni 78'	Report	Éder (yellow card) 19'	Stadium: Stadio Marc'Antonio Bentegodi; Attendance: 20,000; Referee: Piero Giacomelli

3 November 2013 11	Hellas Verona	2–1	Cagliari	Verona
15:00 CET (UTC+01:00)	Toni 8'; Janković 57'	Report	Conti (yellow card) 21', (goal) 90'; Nenê (yellow card) 32'; Ibarbo (yellow card) 89'	Stadium: Stadio Marc'Antonio Bentegodi; Attendance: 18,606; Referee: Andrea Gervasoni

10 November 2013 12	Genoa	2–0	Hellas Verona	Genoa
12:30 CET (UTC+01:00)	Cofie (yellow card) 15'; Portanova 29'; Kucka 35'	Report	González (yellow card) 17'; Cacciatore (yellow card) 37'	Stadium: Stadio Luigi Ferraris; Attendance: 19,000; Referee: Angelo Cervellera

23 November 2013 13	Hellas Verona	0–1	Chievo	Verona
18:00 CET (UTC+01:00)	Moras (yellow card) 25'; Juanito (yellow card) 55'; Jorginho (yellow card) 84'	Report	Théréau (yellow card) 26'; Lazarević 90+2'	Stadium: Stadio Marc'Antonio Bentegodi; Attendance: 24,202; Referee: Marco Guida

2 December 2013 14	Fiorentina	4–3	Hellas Verona	Florence
19:00 CET (UTC+01:00)	Valero 5', 14'; Ambrosini (yellow card) 31'; Vargas 43'; Fernández (yellow card) 49'; Rossi 54' (pen.)	Report	Rômulo 6', (yellow card) 41'; Iturbe 13'; Janković (yellow card) 16' (red card) 53'; Jorginho 72'; Cacciatore (yellow card) 76'	Stadium: Stadio Artemio Franchi; Attendance: 33,976; Referee: Daniele Doveri

8 December 2013 15	Hellas Verona	2–1	Atalanta	Verona
15:00 CET (UTC+01:00)	Maietta (yellow card) 53'; Juanito 82'; Jorginho 87' (pen.)	Report	Carmona (yellow card) 15'; Denis 42', (yellow card) 53'; De Luca (yellow card) 77'; Cazzola (red card) 85'	Stadium: Stadio Marc'Antonio Bentegodi; Attendance: 20,000; Referee: Andrea De Marco

14 December 2013 16	Catania	0–0	Hellas Verona	Catania
18:00 CET (UTC+01:00)	Izco (yellow card) 54'; Spolli (yellow card) 90+2'	Report	Toni (yellow card) 72'	Stadium: Stadio Angelo Massimino; Referee: Antonio Damato

22 December 2013 17	Hellas Verona	4–1	Lazio	Verona
15:00 CET (UTC+01:00)	Toni 5', 78'; Maietta (yellow card) 41'; Iturbe 44'; Rômulo 63'	Report	Ledesma (yellow card) 4'; Biglia 27'; Cana (yellow card) 71'	Stadium: Stadio Marc'Antonio Bentegodi; Referee: Gianpaolo Calvarese

6 January 2014 18	Udinese	1–3	Hellas Verona	Udine
15:00 CET (UTC+01:00)	Pereyra 43'	Report	Toni 8', 39', (yellow card) 90'; Janković (yellow card) 42'; Iturbe 70'	Stadium: Stadio Friuli; Attendance: 13,000; Referee: Angelo Cervellera

12 January 2014 19	Hellas Verona	0–3	Napoli	Verona
15:00 CET (UTC+01:00)	Cacciatore (yellow card) 85'	Report	Mertens 27'; Insigne 72'; Džemaili 76', (yellow card) 84'	Stadium: Stadio Marc'Antonio Bentegodi; Attendance: 20,000; Referee: Daniele Doveri

19 January 2014 20	Milan	1–0	Hellas Verona	Milan
20:45 CET (UTC+01:00)	Silvestre (yellow card) 73'; Montolivo (yellow card) 79'; Balotelli 82' (pen.)	Report	Maietta (yellow card) 90+1'	Stadium: San Siro; Attendance: 40,000; Referee: Mauro Bergonzi

26 January 2014 21	Hellas Verona	1–3	Roma	Verona
12:30 CET (UTC+01:00)	Rômulo (yellow card) 9'; Hallfreðsson 49' (yellow card) 79'; Marques (yellow card) 81'	Report	Nainggolan (yellow card) 44'; Ljajić 45+1'; Gervinho 60'; Destro (yellow card) 67'; Totti 82' (pen.)	Stadium: Stadio Marc'Antonio Bentegodi; Attendance: 23,356; Referee: Paolo Mazzoleni

2 February 2014 22	Sassuolo	1–2	Hellas Verona	Reggio Emilia
15:00 CET (UTC+01:00)	Mendes (yellow card) 66'; Biondini (yellow card) 69'; Floro Flores 90+2'	Report	Iturbe (yellow card) 44'; Manfredini 50' (o.g.); Toni (yellow card) 73', (goal) 86'; Donadel (yellow card) 90+2'	Stadium: Mapei Stadium – Città del Tricolore; Referee: Andrea Gervasoni

9 February 2014 23	Hellas Verona	2–2	Juventus	Verona
15:00 CET (UTC+01:00)	Toni 52'; Marques (yellow card) 83'; Hallfreðsson (yellow card) 90+1'; Juanito 90+4'	Report	Tevez 4', 21'	Stadium: Stadio Marc'Antonio Bentegodi; Attendance: 25,140; Referee: Daniele Doveri

17 February 2014 24	Hellas Verona	1–3	Torino	Verona
20:45 CET (UTC+01:00)	Toni 36' (pen.); Hallfreðsson (yellow card) 44'	Report	El Kaddouri (yellow card) 29', (goal) 61'; Vives (yellow card) 31'; Bovo (yellow card) 45+1'; Immobile 49'; Cerci 53'	Stadium: Stadio Marc'Antonio Bentegodi; Attendance: 20,964; Referee: Gianluca Rocchi

23 February 2014 25	Livorno	2–3	Hellas Verona	Livorno
12:30 CET (UTC+01:00)	Emerson (yellow card) 40'; Gemiti (yellow card) 70'; Paulinho 72'; Greco 73', (yellow card) 74'; Coda (yellow card) 90+4'	Report	Janković 33'; Rômulo 43'; Toni 45+1', (yellow card) 56'; Sala (yellow card) 82'	Stadium: Stadio Armando Picchi; Attendance: 10,030; Referee: Sebastiano Peruzzo

2 March 2014 26	Hellas Verona	0–0	Bologna	Verona
15:00 CET (UTC+01:00)	Moras (yellow card) 81'	Report	Pérez (yellow card) 36'; Morleo (yellow card) 47'; Mantovani (yellow card) 59'; Cristaldo (yellow card) 81' (red card) 82'; Christodoulopoulos (yellow card) 82'	Stadium: Stadio Marc'Antonio Bentegodi; Attendance: 20,476; Referee: Dino Tommasi

9 March 2014 27	Parma	2–0	Hellas Verona	Parma
15:00 CET (UTC+01:00)	Biabiany 20'; Gobbi (yellow card) 21'; Lucarelli (yellow card) 57'; Paletta (yellow card) 71'; Schelotto 90+2'	Report		Stadium: Stadio Ennio Tardini; Attendance: 14,258; Referee: Andrea De Marco

15 March 2014 28	Hellas Verona	0–2	Internazionale	Verona
20:45 CET (UTC+01:00)	Donati (yellow card) 28'; Albertazzi (yellow card) 54'	Report	Palacio 13'; Cambiasso (yellow card) 51'; Jonathan 63'	Stadium: Stadio Marc'Antonio Bentegodi; Attendance: 23,973; Referee: Luca Banti

23 March 2014 29	Sampdoria	5–0	Hellas Verona	Genoa
15:00 CET (UTC+01:00)	Sansone 4', (yellow card) 70'; Gastaldello (yellow card) 17'; Renan 23'; Soriano 38', 48'; Palombo 58'	Report	Donadel (yellow card) 29'; Janković (yellow card) 36'	Stadium: Stadio Luigi Ferraris; Attendance: 20,949; Referee: Gianpaolo Calvarese

26 March 2014 30	Cagliari	1–0	Hellas Verona	Quartu Sant'Elena
20:45 CET (UTC+01:00)	Nenê 31'; Eriksson (yellow card) 59'; Avelar (yellow card) 79'; Pinilla (yellow card) 84'; Ekdal (yellow card) 87'	Report	Sala (yellow card) 86'; Rômulo (yellow card) 88'	Stadium: Stadio Is Arenas; Attendance: 4,000; Referee: Riccardo Pinzani

30 March 2014 31	Hellas Verona	3–0	Genoa	Verona
15:00 CEST (UTC+02:00)	Albertazzi (yellow card) 11' (yellow-red card) 45'; Donadel 35'; Cacciatore (yellow card) 37'; Toni 88', 90+4'	Report	Sturaro (yellow card) 59'; Bertolacci (yellow card) 70'	Stadium: Stadio Marc'Antonio Bentegodi; Attendance: 20,144; Referee: Domenico Celi

6 April 2014 32	Chievo	0–1	Hellas Verona	Verona
15:00 CEST (UTC+02:00)	Hetemaj (yellow card) 36'; Frey (yellow card) 81'	Report	Marquinho (yellow card) 9'; Donadel (yellow card) 28'; Toni 65'	Stadium: Stadio Marc'Antonio Bentegodi; Attendance: 15,000; Referee: Paolo Tagliavento

13 April 2014 33	Hellas Verona	3–5	Fiorentina	Verona
15:00 CEST (UTC+02:00)	Sala (yellow card) 11', (goal) 14'; Donadel (red card) 69'; Toni 73' (pen.); Maietta (yellow card) 82'; Iturbe 90+1'	Report	Cuadrado 31'; Aquilani 44', 86'; Valero 63'; Savić (yellow card) 67'; Pizarro (yellow card) 72'; Matri 83' (pen.)	Stadium: Stadio Marc'Antonio Bentegodi; Attendance: 23,778; Referee: Sebastiano Peruzzo

19 April 2014 34	Atalanta	1–2	Hellas Verona	Bergamo
15:00 CEST (UTC+02:00)	Benalouane (yellow card) 26'; Yepes (yellow card) 35'; Livaja (yellow card) 48'; Carmona (yellow card) 68'; Denis 87'	Report	Donati 53'; Cirigliano (yellow card) 68'; Toni 72'; Donsah (yellow card) 77'	Stadium: Stadio Atleti Azzurri d'Italia; Attendance: 13,487; Referee: Daniele Minelli

27 April 2014 35	Hellas Verona	4–0	Catania	Verona
15:00 CEST (UTC+02:00)	Toni 6'; Frison 28' (o.g.); Marquinho 45'; Juanito 74'	Report	Rolín (yellow card) 1'; Monzón (yellow card) 45+1'; Rinaudo (yellow card) 85'	Stadium: Stadio Marc'Antonio Bentegodi; Attendance: 19,406; Referee: Carmine Russo

4 May 2014 36	Lazio	3–3	Hellas Verona	Rome
15:00 CEST (UTC+02:00)	Radu (yellow card) 18'; Keita 30'; Lulić 60', (red card) 86'; Mauri 90+3'	Report	Marquinho 37', (yellow card) 62'; Iturbe (yellow card) 43', (goal) 69'; Albertazzi (yellow card) 50' (yellow-red card) 90+2'; Donadel (yellow card) 58'; Rafael (yellow card) 76'; Rômulo 83'; Hallfreðsson (yellow card) 90'	Stadium: Stadio Olimpico; Attendance: 27,924; Referee: Paolo Mazzoleni

10 May 2014 37	Hellas Verona	2–2	Udinese	Verona
18:00 CEST (UTC+02:00)	Toni 14' (pen.); Juanito (yellow card) 53'; Hallfreðsson 54'; Donadel (yellow card) 81'	Report	Heurtaux (yellow card) 11'; Domizzi (yellow card) 53'; Di Natale 56'; Danilo (yellow card) 57'; Allan (yellow card) 65'; Badu 90+1'	Stadium: Stadio Marc'Antonio Bentegodi; Attendance: 22,115; Referee: Dino Tommasi

18 May 2014 38	Napoli	5–1	Hellas Verona	Naples
20:45 CEST (UTC+02:00)	Callejón 5', (yellow card) 21'; Zapata 13', 25'; Radošević (yellow card) 59'; Mertens 62', 77'	Report	Agostini (yellow card) 54'; Iturbe 66'	Stadium: Stadio San Paolo; Attendance: 10,000; Referee: Luca Pairetto

=== Coppa Italia ===
17 August 2013 Third round	Palermo	0–1	Verona	Palermo
20:30 CEST (UTC+02:00)	Bačinović (yellow card) 44' (yellow-red card) 90+2'; Vázquez (yellow card) 67'		Donati (yellow card) 15'; Toni 38'; Rômulo (yellow card) 86'	Stadium: Stadio Renzo Barbera; Attendance: 14,387; Referee: Marco Guida

5 December 2013 Fourth round	Sampdoria	4–1	Verona	Genoa
21:00 CET (UTC+01:00)	Sansone 15'; Bjarnason 20'; Wszołek (yellow card) 76'; Rodríguez (yellow card) 81'; Krstičić 83'; Renan 88'	Report	Longo 64'; Donati (yellow card) 87'	Stadium: Stadio Luigi Ferraris; Referee: Luigi Nasca
