= Juanito (footballer, born 1985) =

Argentine footballer

Personal information
- Full name: Juan Ignacio Gómez Taleb
- Date of birth: 20 May 1985 (age 41)
- Place of birth: Reconquista, Argentina
- Height: 1.80 m (5 ft 11 in)
- Position: Striker

Senior career*
| Years | Team | Apps | (Gls) |
| 2004–2005 | Ferentino | 20 | (3) |
| 2005–2006 | Triestina | 8 | (0) |
| 2006–2008 | Bellaria | 54 | (9) |
| 2008–2017 | Hellas Verona | 203 | (39) |
| 2009–2011 | → Gubbio (loan) | 45 | (21) |
| 2017–2018 | Cremonese | 7 | (1) |
| 2018–2019 | Sicula Leonzio | 16 | (2) |
| 2019–2021 | Gubbio | 45 | (16) |
| 2021–2022 | Legnago | 30 | (6) |
| 2022–2025 | Virtus Verona | 90 | (15) |
- * Club domestic league appearances and goals

Juan Ignacio Gómez Taleb (born 20 May 1985), commonly known as Juanito, is an Argentine former footballer who played as a striker.

== Club career ==
=== Triestina ===
He made his Serie B debut with Triestina during the 2005–06 season.

=== Bellaria ===
Juanito left for Bellaria in co-ownership deal in summer 2007 after a successful loan,

=== Verona ===
In June 2008 Triestina bought back Juanito for €21,500 from Bellaria. In the same transfer window he was sold to Verona in another co-ownership deal for €80,000. In June 2009 Triestina gave up the residual 50% registration rights to Verona for free. In 2010–2011 his 18 goals ensured that he was a key player in the promotion of Gubbio to Serie B, the club's first appearance in the division in 63 years.

On 7 July 2015 Juanito signed a new contract with Verona.

On 8 August 2017, he came to a mutual agreement with the club to cancel his contract.

=== Serie C ===
On 11 September 2018, he signed with the Serie C club Sicula Leonzio on a one-year deal with option for the second year.

On 22 October 2019, he returned to Gubbio (now back in the Serie C) until the end of the 2019–20 season. A few days earlier Vincenzo Torrente, who coached Juanito with Gubbio to promotion to Serie B in the 2010–11 season, was hired as the club's head coach once again.

On 10 July 2021, he joined Legnago.

=== Personal life ===
In October 2020 he tested positive for COVID-19.

== Career statistics ==
As of match played 29 September 2021

Appearances and goals by club, season and competition
| Club | Season | League | | | National Cup | | Other | | Total | |
| Club | Season | Division | Apps | Goals | Apps | Goals | Apps | Goals | Apps | Goals |
|---|---|---|---|---|---|---|---|---|---|---|
| Ferentino | 2004–05 | Serie D | 20 | 3 | 0 | 0 | — | | 20 | 3 |
| Triestina | 2005–06 | Serie B | 8 | 0 | 0 | 0 | — | | 8 | 0 |
| Bellaria | 2006–07 | Serie C2 | 22 | 2 | 0 | 0 | — | | 22 | 2 |
| Bellaria | 2007–08 | Serie C2 | 32 | 7 | 0 | 0 | — | | 32 | 7 |
| Bellaria | Total | | 54 | 9 | 0 | 0 | 0 | 0 | 54 | 9 |
| Hellas Verona | 2008–09 | Serie C1 | 19 | 3 | 3 | 0 | — | | 22 | 3 |
| Hellas Verona | 2009–10 | Serie C1 | 7 | 0 | 0 | 0 | — | | 7 | 0 |
| Hellas Verona | 2011–12 | Serie B | 37 | 14 | 3 | 1 | 2 (Note: Appearance(s) in Promotion Playoffs) | 0 | 42 | 15 |
| Hellas Verona | 2012–13 | Serie B | 37 | 10 | 3 | 2 | — | | 40 | 12 |
| Hellas Verona | 2013–14 | Serie A | 29 | 5 | 1 | 0 | — | | 30 | 5 |
| Hellas Verona | 2014–15 | Serie A | 26 | 6 | 2 | 0 | — | | 28 | 6 |
| Hellas Verona | 2015–16 | Serie A | 33 | 1 | 1 | 0 | — | | 34 | 1 |
| Hellas Verona | 2016–17 | Serie B | 16 | 1 | 1 | 0 | — | | 17 | 1 |
| Hellas Verona | Total | | 204 | 40 | 14 | 3 | 2 | 0 | 220 | 43 |
| Gubbio (loan) | 2009–10 | Serie C2 | 15 | 3 | 0 | 0 | 4 (Note: Appearance(s) in Relegation Playoffs) | 2 | 19 | 5 |
| Gubbio (loan) | 2010–11 | Serie C1 | 31 | 18 | 2 | 1 | 1 (Note: Appearance(s) in Supercoppa di Serie C) | 0 | 34 | 19 |
| Gubbio (loan) | Total | | 46 | 21 | 2 | 1 | 5 | 2 | 53 | 21 |
| Cremonese | 2017–18 | Serie B | 7 | 1 | 0 | 0 | — | | 7 | 1 |
| Sicula Leonzio | 2018–19 | Serie C | 16 | 2 | 0 | 0 | — | | 16 | 2 |
| Gubbio | 2019–20 | Serie C | 17 | 5 | 0 | 0 | — | | 17 | 5 |
| Gubbio | 2020–21 | Serie C | 28 | 11 | 0 | 0 | — | | 28 | 11 |
| Gubbio | Total | | 45 | 16 | 0 | 0 | 0 | 0 | 45 | 16 |
| Legnago | 2021–22 | Serie C | 5 | 0 | 0 | 0 | 2 (Note: Appearance(s) in Coppa Italia Serie C) | 0 | 7 | 0 |
| Career total | | | 405 | 92 | 18 | 5 | 9 | 2 | 432 | 99 |
