= Luca Toni =

Italian footballer (born 1977)

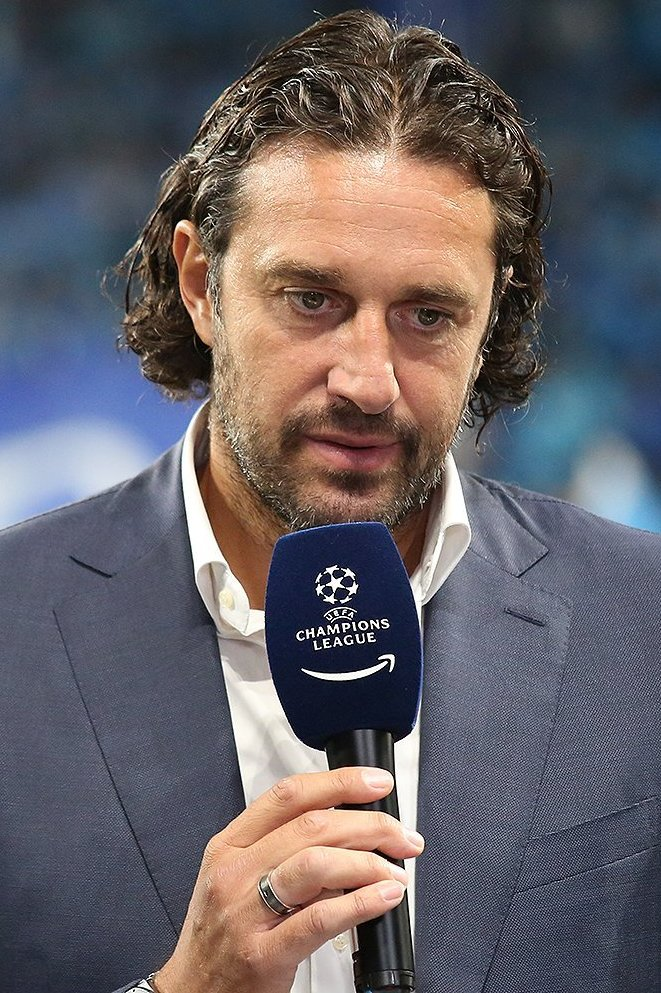
- Toni in 2021

Personal information
- Full name: Luca Toni
- Date of birth: 26 May 1977 (age 49)
- Place of birth: Pavullo nel Frignano, Italy
- Height: 1.93 m (6 ft 4 in)
- Position: Striker

Youth career
- 1990–1991: Officine Meccaniche Frignanesi
- 1991–1994: Modena

Senior career*
Years	Team	Apps	(Gls)
1994–1996	Modena	32	(7)
1996–1997	Empoli	3	(1)
1997–1998	Fiorenzuola	26	(2)
1998–1999	Lodigiani	31	(15)
1999–2000	Treviso	35	(15)
2000–2001	Vicenza	31	(9)
2001–2003	Brescia	44	(15)
2003–2005	Palermo	80	(50)
2005–2007	Fiorentina	67	(47)
2007–2010	Bayern Munich	60	(38)
2009	Bayern Munich II	2	(0)
2010	→ Roma (loan)	15	(5)
2010–2011	Genoa	16	(3)
2011–2012	Juventus	14	(2)
2012	Al Nasr	7	(3)
2012–2013	Fiorentina	27	(8)
2013–2016	Hellas Verona	95	(48)
Total		586	(268)

International career
2004–2009	Italy	47	(16)
Medal record
Men's football
Representing Italy
FIFA World Cup
Winner	2006 Germany
- * Club domestic league appearances and goals

Luca Toni Ufficiale OMRI (Italian pronunciation: [ˈluːka ˈtɔːni]; born 26 May 1977) is an Italian former professional footballer who played as a striker. A prolific goalscorer, Toni scored over 300 goals throughout his career, and is one of the top-five highest scoring Italians in all competitions; with 322 career goals, he is currently the fourth-highest scoring Italian player of all time, second only to Alessandro Del Piero in the post-World War II era. At international level, he represented the Italy national team on 47 occasions, scoring 16 goals.

He is considered one of the best strikers of his generation, known for effective finishing and his leadership skills in attack. Something of a footballing nomad, at club level, Toni played for thirteen different Italian teams throughout his career. A late bloomer, he spent several seasons in the lower divisions of Italian football, as well as promising spells with minor Serie A clubs Vicenza and Brescia, before finally making his breakthrough with Palermo: he helped the team to Serie A promotion during the 2003–04 season by winning the Serie B title, and was the league's top scorer with 30 goals; the following season, he helped the club qualify for Europe, scoring 20 goals in Serie A. After two prolific seasons with Fiorentina, Toni also spent three seasons with German side Bayern Munich, where he helped the club to a domestic treble during the 2007–08 season, also reaching the UEFA Cup semi-finals; after falling out with the club's manager during his third season with the team, and being demoted to the reserve squad, he later returned to Italy on loan with Roma in 2010, and subsequently had spells with Genoa and Juventus. In 2012, he played for Al Nasr, in the UAE Arabian Gulf League, but returned to Fiorentina for a season later that year. He retired in 2016, after three seasons with Hellas Verona, the last as team captain.

Toni made his international debut in 2004 and took part at the 2006 FIFA World Cup, UEFA Euro 2008, and the 2009 FIFA Confederations Cup with Italy; he most notably contributed to Italy's 2006 World Cup victory, as he scored twice and was elected to the tournament's All-star team.

In addition to the team medals he collected, Toni also won several individual honours: during his first spell with Fiorentina, he won the Capocannoniere (Serie A top scorer) award during the 2005–06 season, in which he scored 31 goals (the most goals in a Serie A season since 1958–59), which also earned him the European Golden Shoe, becoming the first Italian player ever to win the award; he was also the league's joint top scorer in the 2014–15 Serie A season, in which he became the oldest player to win the award at the age of 38, with 22 goals. Toni also finished as top scorer in the 2007–08 Bundesliga, with 24 goals, and in the 2007–08 UEFA Cup, with 10 goals.

== Club career ==
=== Early career ===
Toni started his professional career at Modena. This was followed by a number of seasons spent around Serie B and Serie C1 with teams such as Empoli, Fiorenzuola, and Lodigiani. After a Serie B season with Treviso in 1999, he moved to Vicenza, playing in Serie A for the first time. He then moved to Brescia, playing for two seasons under manager Carlo Mazzone, alongside Roberto Baggio and Pep Guardiola.

=== Palermo ===
In 2003, he agreed to join ambitious Serie B club Palermo, being one of the main factors behind the winning team campaign that brought the Rosanero back to Serie A after over 30 years, thanks to a record 30 goals scored during the season. He consequently gained his first cap for the Italy national team in a friendly match 18 August 2004 lost 2–0 to Iceland in Reykjavík, which also marked Marcello Lippi's debut at the helm of the Azzurri.

In the following season, Toni confirmed his prolificity by scoring 20 goals in Palermo's first Serie A campaign, leading the Sicilian club to a historical first qualification to the UEFA Cup.

=== Fiorentina ===
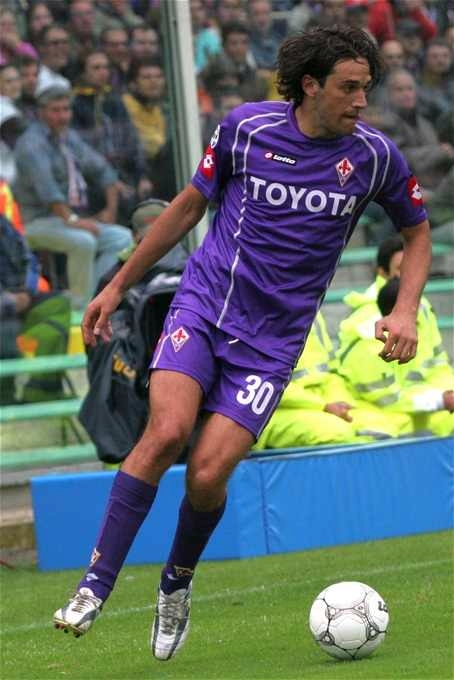
Toni playing for Fiorentina

Toni's move to Fiorentina was marked by controversy as Palermo fans dubbed him a traitor for his departure. I Viola paid €10 million to sign him.

During his first season in Florence he scored 31 goals, only five shy of the single season record by one player. This was the first time in 50 years that a Serie A player had scored 30 or more goals in the league, a feat which cemented his status as one of the most prolific Serie A strikers in history. Toni was awarded the European Golden Shoe for his achievement and is the first Italian player to win this award. His goal scoring ability brought Fiorentina to heights never seen since Gabriel Batistuta's days in the late 1990s. They finished the season fourth in the league and qualified for the Champions League.

This league position, however, was revoked in the courts during the Calciopoli scandal. Fiorentina was found guilty of influencing the Italian Referee's Association and as a result had to start the 2006–07 season with a 19-point deduction. Toni expressed his desire to leave the team several times during the summer to the press, but was eventually convinced by club president Andrea Della Valle to stay. The following season was plagued by injury, limiting Toni's contributions to 16 goals. He would leave during the summer after promising Della Valle not to sign for any Italian rivals.

=== Bayern Munich ===
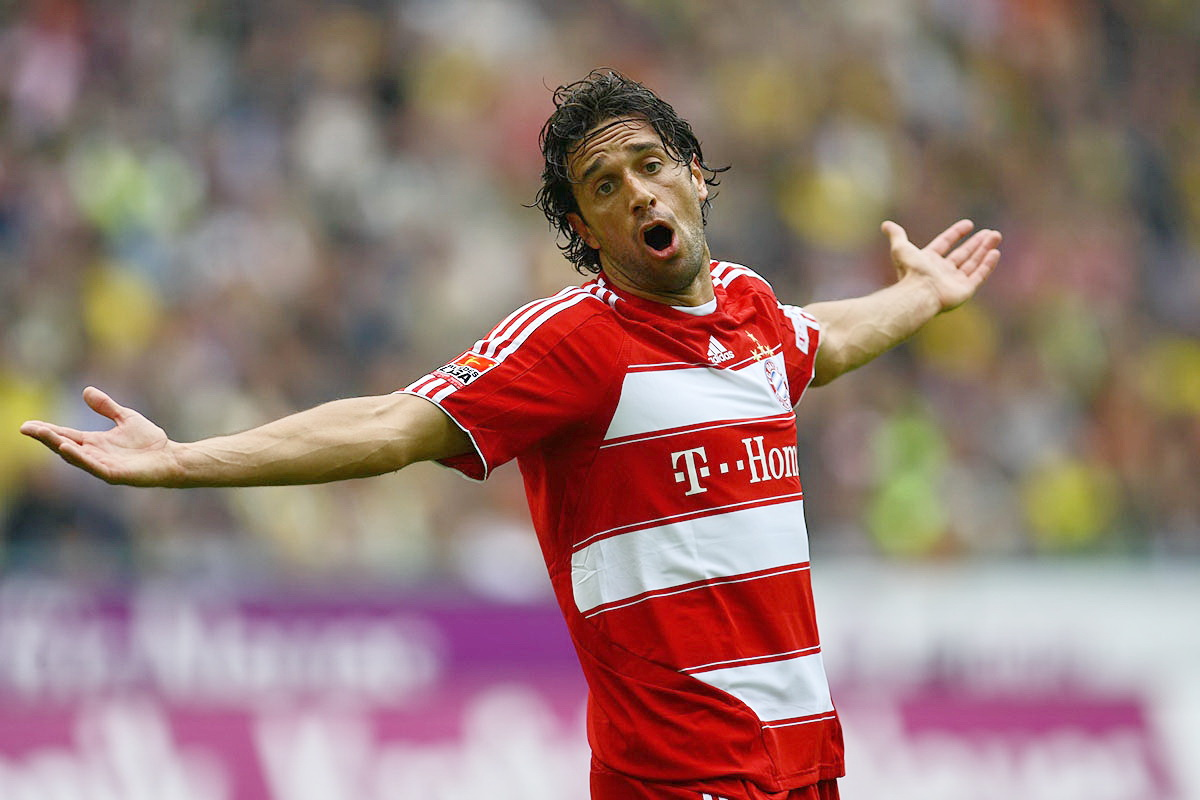
Toni with Bayern Munich

On 30 May 2007, Bayern Munich chairman Karl-Heinz Rummenigge confirmed that Toni had signed a four-year contract with the club after agreeing to a deal worth €11.58 million with Fiorentina. On 7 June, Toni was presented at a Bayern press conference along with fellow new signing Franck Ribéry. Toni was given the number 9 shirt.

Toni scored four goals in a 19 December 6–0 home win against Aris of Greece to help Bayern win their UEFA Cup group. On 17 February 2008, he scored his first Bundesliga hat-trick (a "perfect hat-trick": a goal with each foot and a header, all coming in one half) against Hannover 96, which was the first hat-trick for a Bayern player in the Bundesliga since Hans Dorfner in 1989. Bayern won the away fixture 3–0.

In a quarter-final second leg match in the UEFA Cup, Toni scored two dramatic goals in the 115th and 120th minutes of extra time, in a game which finished 3–3 and lifted Bayern Munich past Getafe of Spain on away goals. Bayern eventually lost to Zenit Saint Petersburg in the semi-final. At the 2007–08 UEFA Cup, he shared the first place with Pavel Pogrebnyak from Zenit at the top scorers list with 10 goals.

He scored two goals in the German Cup final against Borussia Dortmund in a 2–1 win; his second goal was the winner in extra time to give Bayern Munich another cup victory. Toni finished as top scorer in the 2007–08 Bundesliga season with 24 goals. Overall, Toni finished the season with 39 goals and 12 assists in 46 matches.

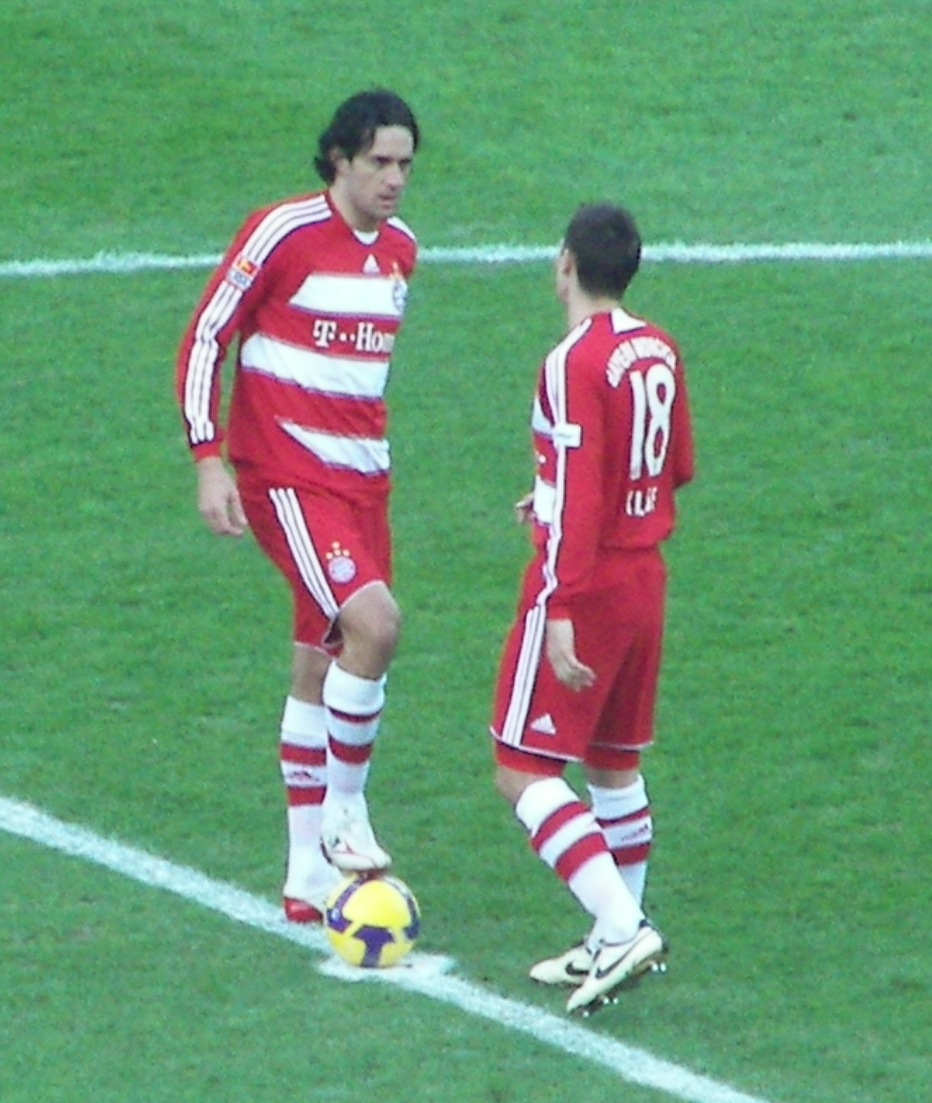
Toni and Miroslav Klose against Hertha Berlin in 2009

In the 2008–09 season, Toni maintained his high-standard of form for Bayern. In the Bundesliga, he started 13 games from January, in which he scored nine goals, a notable one being a late stoppage-time winner he scored against TSG Hoffenheim. In the 2008–09 UEFA Champions League, he scored a goal in a 3–0 win over Steaua București in the group stages, then a brace in a 5–0 away win over Sporting CP in the round of 16.

Toni battled an Achilles tendon injury for most of the second half of the 2008–09 season, but still finished as Bayern's leading scorer in league play, tallying 14 goals in 25 Bundesliga appearances.

Recovering from his injury he appeared in two matches of the second team Bayern Munich II in the 3. Liga in September 2009.

On 7 November 2009, he was fined for leaving the stadium during the match after being substituted at half-time.

Following his fall out with Bayern manager Louis van Gaal, Bayern's president, Uli Hoeneß, stated on DSF Doppelpass that Toni would be allowed to leave the club on a free transfer. Eventually, Toni, by mutual agreement with Bayern, was loaned out to Italian club Roma.

==== Loan to Roma ====
On 31 December 2009, Bayern Munich confirmed the transfer of the Italian striker on a six-month loan basis to Roma, which offered him pre-tax basic salary of €3.1 million. He debuted for Roma against Cagliari on 6 January 2010. He scored his first two goals for Roma against Genoa on 17 January 2010 (for 2–0 and 3–0). Toni would go on to score five goals in total for the Giallorossi during the remainder of the 2009–10 season, including the winner against Internazionale to cut the Milanese club's lead in Serie A to a single point ahead of Roma.

=== Genoa ===
On 16 June 2010, Bayern announced the termination of Toni's contract. In the same month, after some days of speculation, it was confirmed that Luca Toni had found an agreement with Genoa for a two-year contract, reportedly at a net salary of €4 million per season, as subsequently confirmed by club Chairman Enrico Preziosi. The player, who was presented to the press on 1 July, took on the number 9 jersey.

=== Juventus ===
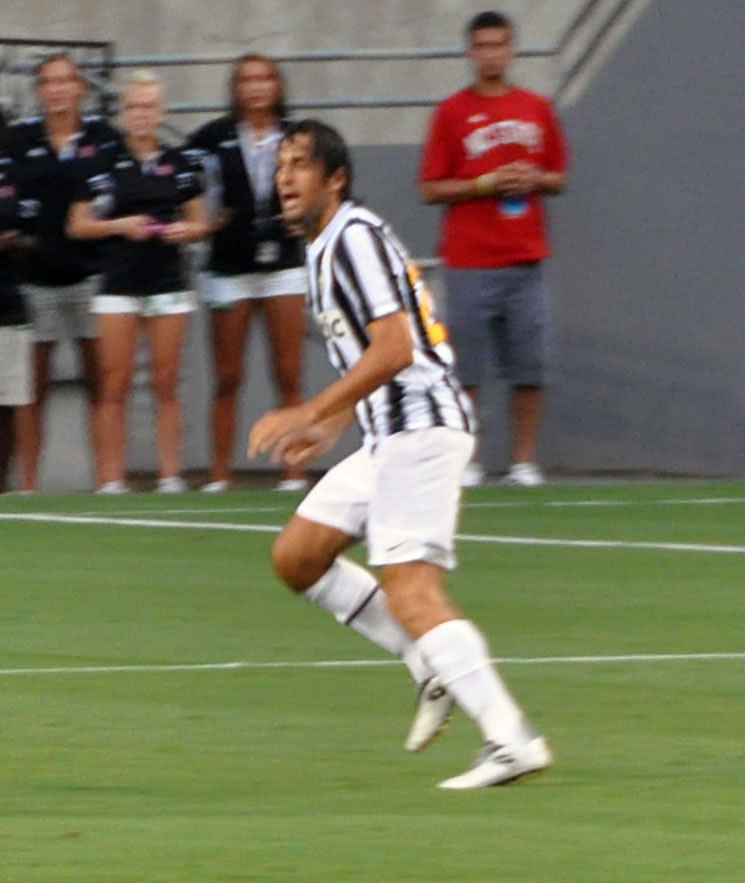
Toni playing for Juventus in 2011

On 7 January 2011, a statement in the Juventus official website announced that Luca Toni would be joining Juventus on a free transfer deal, until 30 June 2012. Toni scored his 100th goal in Serie A with a header from 16 meters against Cagliari, which was also his debut goal for Juventus. Toni also scored the first goal at the new Juventus Stadium against Notts County on 8 September 2011.

=== Al Nasr ===
On 30 January 2012, Juventus confirmed that they have agreed a deal for Luca Toni with Emirati club Al Nasr.

=== Return to Fiorentina ===
On 31 August 2012, in the closing hour of the transfer market, Fiorentina announced that they completed the signing of Luca Toni, after he had been previously linked with a move to Siena. Toni made it a goal-scoring return for La Viola when, after coming on as a 64th-minute substitute for Adem Ljajić, he scored with his first touch the second goal in a 2–0 win over Catania in the Stadio Artemio Franchi on 16 September 2012.

=== Verona ===
On 5 July 2013, Toni signed a one-year contract with newly promoted to Serie A club Verona. On 17 August, Toni scored his first goal for Verona in a 1–0 victory over Palermo in the Coppa Italia. In his Serie A debut for the club on 24 August, Toni scored twice as Verona recorded a 2–1 home win over Milan on the opening day of the season. Toni displayed fine form for Verona and after scoring two as well as assisting a goal in successive games there were calls for him to return to the national squad with Toni stating "I am thinking about doing well. Then it is for Cesare Prandelli to decide. For me, it would be a pleasure and an honour to go to the World Cup, but whatever happens there would be no issue".

He ended the 2013–14 season with 20 goals, making him the second-top goalscorer in Serie A at the age of 37.

During the 2014–15 season, he maintained a high standard of performance, scoring his 300th career goal in a 2–1 win over Udinese on 14 December 2014. He finished the season with 22 goals, which took him to the top of the Serie A goalscoring charts, along with Mauro Icardi, at the age of 38 becoming the oldest Capocannoniere in Serie A. In 2015, France Football rated him as one of the 10 best footballers in the world who are over the age of 36.

Toni's third season with the club was less successful, as injuries and clashes with the club's manager Luigi Delneri saw him struggle to gain form and playing time. After Verona was seen relegated from the 2015–16 Serie A season, Toni confirmed his retirement from football on 4 May 2016. He scored his last ever career goal on his final match from the penalty spot in a 2–1 home win over Serie A champions Juventus, with a Panenka style penalty, and later also started the play which led to Verona's second goal; this was his 23rd appearance and sixth goal of the league season. In the 85th minute, a visibly emotional Toni was substituted and received a standing ovation from the fans. In total, he had managed 48 league goals for Verona during his three seasons in the Italian top division with the club, 157 career Serie A goals in 344 league appearances, and a career total of 324 goals in all competitions (with 659 appearances and 306 goals at club level, and 47 appearances and 16 goals with the Italy national team). Toni explained his decision to retire after the match, stating that he would not be playing in Verona's final match of the season, in an away fixture against his former club Palermo, as he wanted to play his final career match in his team's home stadium.

== International career ==
Toni scored 16 goals in 47 appearances for the Italy national team. He received his first international call-up in August 2004 under manager Marcello Lippi, and subsequently made his debut for the Italy national team as a substitute on 18 August 2004, in a 2–0 friendly defeat against Iceland. He scored his first international goal on 4 September 2004, after coming off the bench in a 2–1 home win against Norway, in a World Cup Qualifying match.

On 17 November, Toni made his first international start in a 1–0 friendly home win over Finland. On 11 June 2005, he captained the Italian squad for the first time in his career in a friendly match in New York against Ecuador, due to the absence of Fabio Cannavaro and other experienced players; he scored Italy's only goal in the eventual 1–1 draw. On 7 September, Toni scored his first international hat-trick in a 4–1 victory against Belarus in a 2006 World Cup qualifying match, becoming the first Fiorentina player ever to do so.

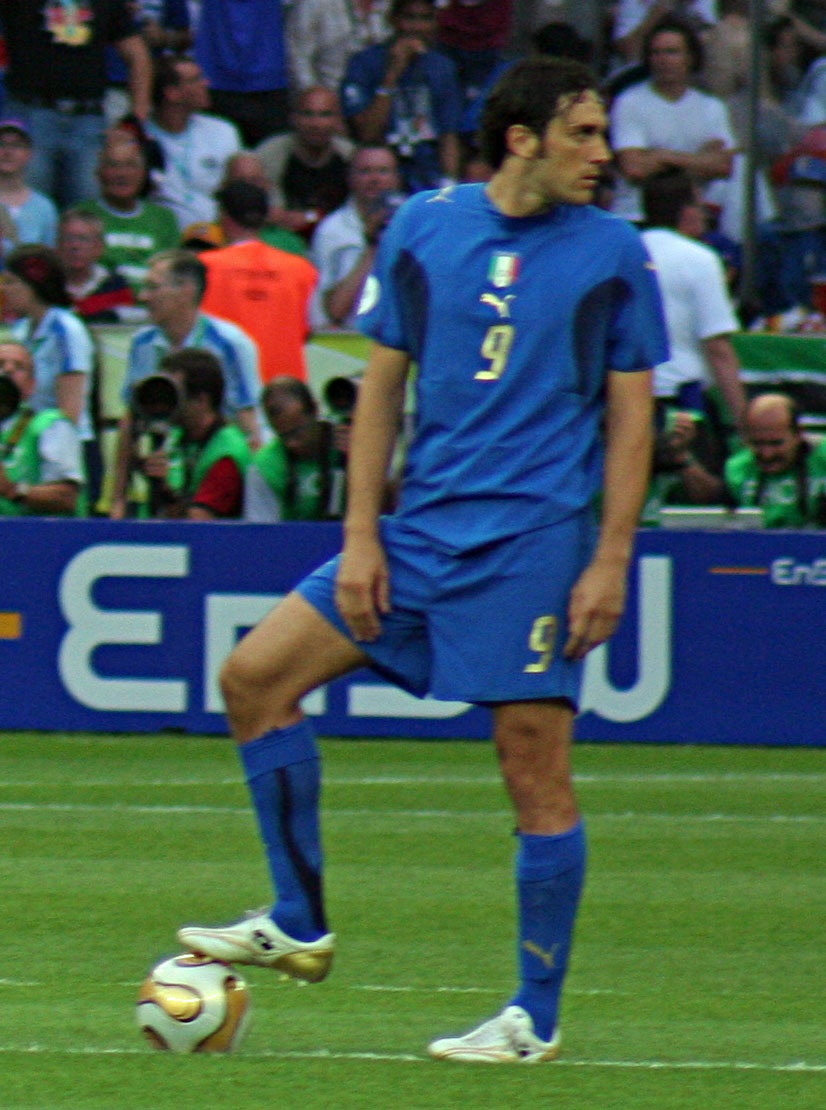
Toni during the 2006 FIFA World Cup Final

Toni was selected to Italy's 23-man 2006 World Cup squad, and was given the number 9 shirt. In Italy's opening match against Ghana, he hit the crossbar as Italy won 2–0, and he later scored two goals in the quarter-finals against Ukraine on 30 June, his only goals of the tournament, as Italy won 3–0 to advance to the semi-finals against the hosts Germany. In the final against France, he hit the crossbar with a powerful header and later netted another header, although the goal was disallowed as the attempt was controversially ruled offside. Italy eventually defeated France 5–3 on penalties, after a 1–1 draw following extra-time, to win their fourth World Cup title; Toni finished the tournament as Italy's top goal-scorer, alongside Marco Materazzi, with two goals, also producing 20 shots and hitting the crossbar twice. He was also fouled 28 times throughout the tournament, more than any other player. For his performances, Toni was named to the 2006 World Cup Team of the Tournament.

On 28 March 2007, Toni scored two goals in Italy's 2–0 home win over Scotland in a Euro 2008 qualifier. After undergoing surgery due to an injury to his left foot which he had struggled to overcome since the beginning of the 2006–07 season, he missed Italy's next two qualifiers against the Faroe Islands and Lithuania. He returned to action for his nation's qualification game against Georgia in Genoa on 13 October, and assisted Fabio Grosso, who scored Italy's second goal in a 2–0 win. On 17 November 2007, Toni struck in the first minute of a 2–1 win in a qualifying match against Scotland at Hampden Park, which secured Italy's place at the final stages of the competition. Four days later, he scored the second goal against the Faroe Islands, as Italy closed off their qualifying campaign with a 3–1 home win. He finished the qualifying round as Italy's top-scorer with five goals in six appearances.

Toni was called up to the 23-man Italian squad for UEFA Euro 2008 by manager Roberto Donadoni, but his form in the tournament was disappointing, as he failed to score; he managed a goal in Italy's second group match against Romania, but it was controversially disallowed for offside, as Italy drew the match 1–1. Toni's main contribution for the team was winning a decisive penalty kick in the final group match against France, which ended 2–0, and allowed the Italians to progress to the knock-out round. Italy then bowed out of the tournament on penalties to eventual champions Spain in the quarter-final, following a 0–0 draw after extra-time.

Despite disappointing at Euro 2008, Toni was called up by returning coach Marcello Lippi for Italy's first two 2010 FIFA World Cup qualifiers. Toni also scored an equaliser in a 1–1 draw against Greece, in an international friendly on 19 November 2008, which was his final international goal. He was subsequently named to Lippi's 23-man Italy squad that took part at the 2009 FIFA Confederations Cup in South Africa, and appeared in all three of his nation's group matches, although Italy disappointed, suffering a first-round elimination. Following the tournament, he was no longer called up to the national team, and he was not included in Lippi's provisional 30-man Italian squad for the 2010 FIFA World Cup final tournament.

Toni's goalscoring form with Verona in 2014 saw him become a popular potential candidate for a place as a reserve in Italy's 23-man 2014 FIFA World Cup squad, although he was later excluded from Cesare Prandelli's final team for the tournament.

Following Toni's retirement from professional football at the end of the 2015–16 season with Verona, the Italian Football Federation paid tribute to him before Italy's friendly match against Finland at the Stadio Bentegodi in Verona on 6 June 2016; he was presented with a commemorative shirt by FIGC President Carlo Tavecchio, and was awarded a city plaque by Verona's mayor, Flavio Tosi, and the town's sports councillor, Alberto Bozza.

== Post-retirement ==
Following his retirement, Toni undertook a course to become a director of sport with his former club Verona. However, Verona announced that he would leave the club after his contract expired on 30 June 2017. On 15 December 2017, Toni received his coaching licence. In August 2019, he enrolled in the UEFA Pro Licence courses at Coverciano. Toni received his UEFA Pro Licence on 16 September 2020.

== Style of play ==
A prolific goal-scorer, Toni was a traditional centre-forward, who excelled in the air and acrobatically; although in his youth he was known for his attacking movement, which allowed him to play anywhere along the front-line or off of his teammates, he mainly operated in the penalty area in his later career, as he lost his pace and his work-rate decreased. Although naturally right footed, he was an accurate finisher with both feet, and an excellent penalty taker. Although his physical, opportunistic, "goal-poaching" style of play was at times criticized as unrefined and unorthodox, due to his lack of notable technical skills, he also drew praise throughout his career for his leadership and ability to utilise his height, solid first touch, and strong physique to win aerial challenges, hold up the ball for his teammates, and provide them with assists when playing with his back to goal, in addition to his ability to score goals himself. His strength, aerial prowess, and power saw him become one of the best ever headers of the ball in the Italian League.

Writing for The Guardian, Tom Mason has said of his play, "His retirement marks the end of not only a remarkable career, but of a whole breed of striker...he seems to be a relic of an out-dated and discredited ideology. In a world where forwards are the first line of defense, where high-intensity pressing and sharp bursts of energy are a prerequisite for strikers, there seems to be little room for players in the mold of Luca Toni. Ill-equipped for a fast-paced counter-attack, unlikely to trouble defenders in behind, his domain is the 18-yard box and little outside it." In the final season of his career, Toni was described as "the last great Italian centre-forward" by Italian sports newspaper La Gazzetta dello Sport.

=== Goal celebrations ===
Throughout his career, Toni was known for celebrating his goals by looking at his teammates and rotating his right hand next to his ear, as if to say, "do you realize what it is I have just done?"

== Personal life ==
Toni is married to Italian model Marta Cecchetto. Their son was stillborn on 1 June 2012. Their daughter Bianca was born in June 2013. On 30 July 2014, a second son, Leonardo, was born in Florence.

In March 2015, German authorities sued Toni for €1.7 million in unpaid taxes to the Catholic Church. That July, he sued his former tax adviser for the same amount, claiming that he had been registered without prior knowledge as a Roman Catholic in Germany and thus had paid taxes to the Church in conflict with his own beliefs. In December, he received a payout of €1.25 million when the court found in his favour.

In 2019, he stated that he has center-right political views and that he is a supporter of anti-immigrant politician Matteo Salvini, joining him on stage during a rally in Modena.

== Career statistics ==
=== Club ===
Appearances and goals by club, season and competition
Club	Season	League			National cup (Note: Includes Coppa Italia, DFB-Pokal, UAE League Cup)		Continental		Other		Total	
Club	Season	Division	Apps	Goals	Apps	Goals	Apps	Goals	Apps	Goals	Apps	Goals
Modena	1994–95	Serie C1	7	2	–		–		2 (Note: Appearances in Serie C1 relegation play-offs)	1	9	3
Modena	1995–96	Serie C1	25	5	–		–		–		25	5
Modena	Total		32	7	–		–		2	1	34	8
Empoli	1996–97	Serie B	3	1	0	0	–		–		3	1
Fiorenzuola	1997–98	Serie C1	26	2	–		–		4 (Note: Appearances in Coppa Italia Serie C)	2	30	4
Lodigiani	1998–99	Serie C1	31	15	–		–		2	1	33	16
Treviso	1999–2000	Serie B	35	15	4	1	–		–		39	16
Vicenza	2000–01	Serie A	31	9	2	0	–		–		33	9
Brescia	2001–02	Serie A	28	13	4	1	2 (Note: Appearances in UEFA Intertoto Cup)	0	–		34	14
Brescia	2002–03	Serie A	16	2	0	0	–		–		16	2
Brescia	Total		44	15	4	1	2	0	–		50	16
Palermo	2003–04	Serie B	45	30	2	0	–		–		47	30
Palermo	2004–05	Serie A	35	20	1	1	–		–		36	21
Palermo	Total		80	50	3	1	–		–		83	51
Fiorentina	2005–06	Serie A	38	31	4	2	–		–		42	33
Fiorentina	2006–07	Serie A	29	16	0	0	–		–		29	16
Fiorentina	Total		67	47	4	2	–		–		71	49
Bayern Munich	2007–08	Bundesliga	31	24	4	5	11 (Note: Appearances in UEFA Cup)	10	0	0	46	39
Bayern Munich	2008–09	Bundesliga	25	14	2	1	8 (Note: Appearances in UEFA Champions League)	3	–		35	18
Bayern Munich	2009–10	Bundesliga	4	0	2	1	2	0	–		8	1
Bayern Munich	Total		60	38	8	7	21	13	0	0	89	58
Bayern Munich II	2009–10	3. Liga	2	0	–		–		–		2	0
Roma	2009–10	Serie A	15	5	2	0	0	0	–		17	5
Genoa	2010–11	Serie A	16	3	2	4	–		–		18	7
Juventus	2010–11	Serie A	14	2	1	0	0	0	–		15	2
Juventus	2011–12	Serie A	0	0	0	0	–		–		0	0
Juventus	Total		14	2	1	0	0	0	–		15	2
Al Nasr	2011–12	UAE Pro League	8	3	2	2	3 (Note: Appearances in AFC Champions League)	0	–		13	5
Fiorentina	2012–13	Serie A	27	8	1	0	–		–		28	8
Hellas Verona	2013–14	Serie A	34	20	2	1	–		–		36	21
Hellas Verona	2014–15	Serie A	38	22	1	1	–		–		39	23
Hellas Verona	2015–16	Serie A	23	6	2	1	–		–		25	7
Hellas Verona	Total		95	48	5	3	–		–		100	51
Career total			584	267	38	21	26	13	8	4	658	306

=== International ===
Appearances and goals by national team and year
National team	Year	Apps	Goals
Italy	2004	5	1
Italy	2005	10	5
Italy	2006	11	4
Italy	2007	5	4
Italy	2008	11	2
Italy	2009	5	0
Total		47	16

Scores and results list Italy's goal tally first, score column indicates score after each Toni goal.

List of international goals scored by Luca Toni
No.	Date	Venue	Opponent	Score	Result	Competition
1	4 September 2004	Stadio Renzo Barbera, Palermo, Italy	Norway	2–1	2–1	2006 FIFA World Cup qualification
2	11 June 2005	Giants Stadium, New Jersey, United States	Ecuador	1–0	1–1	Friendly
3	7 September 2005	Dinamo Stadium (Minsk), Minsk, Belarus	Belarus	1–1	4–1	2006 FIFA World Cup qualification
4	7 September 2005	Dinamo Stadium (Minsk), Minsk, Belarus	Belarus	2–1	4–1	2006 FIFA World Cup qualification
5	7 September 2005	Dinamo Stadium (Minsk), Minsk, Belarus	Belarus	4–1	4–1	2006 FIFA World Cup qualification
6	12 November 2005	Amsterdam Arena, Amsterdam, Netherlands	Netherlands	3–1	3–1	Friendly
7	1 March 2006	Stadio Artemio Franchi, Florence, Italy	Germany	2–0	4–1	Friendly
8	30 June 2006	Volksparkstadion, Hamburg, Germany	Ukraine	2–0	3–0	2006 FIFA World Cup
9	30 June 2006	Volksparkstadion, Hamburg, Germany	Ukraine	3–0	3–0	2006 FIFA World Cup
10	7 October 2006	Stadio Olimpico, Rome, Italy	Ukraine	2–0	2–0	UEFA Euro 2008 qualifying
11	28 March 2007	Stadio San Nicola, Bari, Italy	Scotland	1–0	2–0	UEFA Euro 2008 qualifying
12	28 March 2007	Stadio San Nicola, Bari, Italy	Scotland	2–0	2–0	UEFA Euro 2008 qualifying
13	17 November 2007	Hampden Park, Glasgow, Scotland	Scotland	1–0	2–1	UEFA Euro 2008 qualifying
14	21 November 2007	Stadio Alberto Braglia, Modena, Italy	Faroe Islands	2–0	3–1	UEFA Euro 2008 qualifying
15	6 February 2008	Letzigrund, Zurich, Switzerland	Portugal	1–0	3–1	Friendly
16	19 November 2008	Karaiskakis Stadium, Piraeus, Greece	Greece	1–1	1–1	Friendly

== Honours ==
Palermo

- Serie B: 2003–04

Bayern Munich

- Bundesliga: 2007–08, 2009–10
- DFB-Pokal: 2007–08, 2009–10
- DFB-Ligapokal: 2007

Italy

- FIFA World Cup: 2006

Individual

- Serie B top scorer: 2003–04
- Pallone d'Argento: 2005–06
- Serie A top scorer: 2005–06, 2014–15
- Serie A Goalscorer of the Year: 2006
- Guerin d'Oro: 2006
- European Golden Shoe: 2005–06
- FIFA World Cup All-Star Team: 2006
- ESM Team of the Year: 2005–06
- kicker Bundesliga Team of the Season: 2007–08
- Bundesliga top scorer: 2007–08
- UEFA Cup top scorer: 2007–08
- FIFPro World XI Nominee 2006, 2007, 2008
- Serie A Team of the Year: 2014–15
- Premio Nazionale Carriera Esemplare "Gaetano Scirea": 2015
- Fiorentina Hall of Fame: 2016

Orders

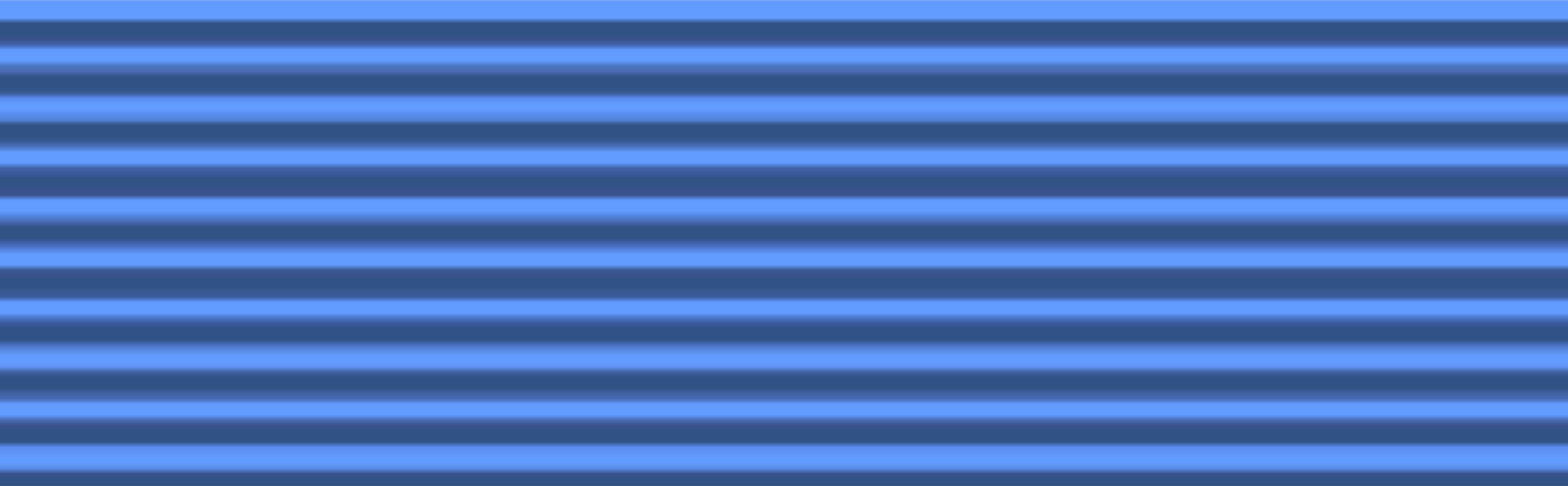
- CONI: Golden Collar of Sports Merit: 2006
- 4th Class/Officer: Ufficiale Ordine al Merito della Repubblica Italiana: 2006
