= Rafael (footballer, born March 1982) =

Brazilian footballer

Personal information
- Full name: Rafael de Andrade Bittencourt Pinheiro
- Date of birth: 3 March 1982 (age 44)
- Place of birth: São Paulo, Brazil
- Height: 1.84 m (6 ft 0 in)
- Position: Goalkeeper

Youth career
- 1995: Nacional-SP
- 1996: Corinthians
- 1997–2000: Juventus-SP

Senior career*
Years	Team	Apps	(Gls)
2001–2005	Santos	6	(0)
2005–2007	São Bento	23	(0)
2007–2016	Verona	282	(0)
2016–2020	Cagliari	38	(0)
2020–2021	Spezia	3	(0)
Total		352	(0)
- * Club domestic league appearances and goals

Rafael de Andrade Bittencourt Pinheiro (born 3 March 1982) simply known as Rafael, is a Brazilian retired footballer who played as a goalkeeper. He also holds an Italian passport.

== Biography ==
=== Early career ===
He left Brazil for Italy after playing 17 (out of 19) matches in 2007 Campeonato Paulista for Esporte Clube São Bento, ahead of Maurício Assoline. He was an understudy of Júlio Sérgio and Fábio Costa at Santos FC.

=== Verona ===
In Verona, after missing only three games (of a possible 136) in four seasons of Lega Pro, the third highest football league in Italy, Rafael played a crucial role in helping his team reach the 2010–11 Lega Pro Division One playoffs and win them, to return to Serie B after a four-year absence. Two seasons later, the Brazilian goalkeeper and his teammates of Verona reach the second place and were promoted to Serie A, with Rafael that impose itself as the best goalkeeper in the junior category (only 29 goals conceded in 40 games).

Rafael was successively confirmed as first choice keeper for the club's Serie A comeback season in 2013, despite the signing of Bulgarian international Nikolay Mihaylov, playing 37 games out of 38 during the full championship.

=== Cagliari ===
In 2016 he was sold to Cagliari, with Marco Fossati moved to opposite direction. Cagliari also loaned out its backup goalkeeper Simone Colombi in the same week.

=== Spezia ===
On 17 September 2020, Rafael joined Spezia on a free transfer.

== Career statistics ==
Appearances and goals by club, season and competition
Club	Season	League			State league		Cup		Other		Total	
Club	Season	Division	Apps	Goals	Apps	Goals	Apps	Goals	Apps	Goals	Apps	Goals
São Bento	2006	Campeonato Paulista	—		6	0	—		—		6	0
São Bento	2007	Campeonato Paulista	—		17	0	—		—		17	0
São Bento	Total		—		23	0	—		—		23	0
Hellas Verona	2007–08	Serie C1	34	0	—		1	0	2	0	37	0
Hellas Verona	2008–09	Lega Pro 1D	34	0	—		2	0	—		36	0
Hellas Verona	2009–10	Lega Pro 1D	31	0	—		4	0	4	0	39	0
Hellas Verona	2010–11	Lega Pro 1D	34	0	—		2	0	4	0	40	0
Hellas Verona	2011–12	Serie B	40	0	—		3	0	2	0	45	0
Hellas Verona	2012–13	Serie B	40	0	—		4	0	—		44	0
Hellas Verona	2013–14	Serie A	37	0	—		1	0	—		38	0
Hellas Verona	2014–15	Serie A	20	0	—		0	0	—		22	0
Hellas Verona	2015–16	Serie A	12	0	—		1	0	—		13	0
Hellas Verona	Total		282	0	—		20	0	12	0	314	0
Cagliari	2015–16	Serie B	1	0	—		—		—		1	0
Cagliari	2016–17	Serie A	21	0	—		1	0	—		22	0
Cagliari	2017–18	Serie A	10	0	—		0	0	—		10	0
Cagliari	2018–19	Serie A	0	0	—		1	0	—		1	0
Cagliari	2019–20	Serie A	6	0	—		1	0	—		7	0
Cagliari	Total		38	0	—		3	0	—		41	0
Spezia	2020–21	Serie A	3	0	—		0	0	—		3	0
Career total			323	0	23	0	23	0	12	0	381	0
