= Jorginho (footballer, born December 1991) =

Brazilian-Italian footballer (born 1991)

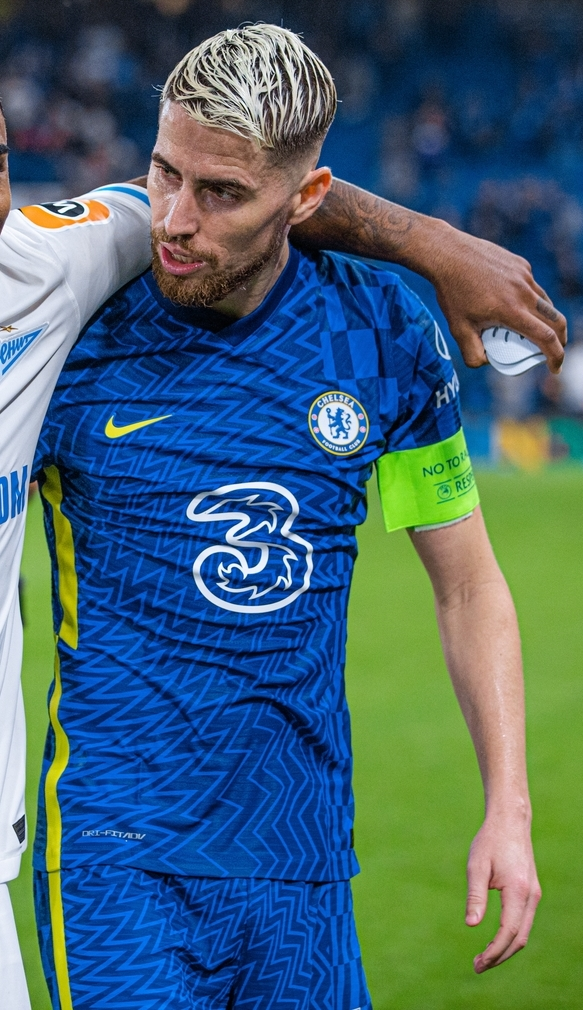
- Jorginho lining up for Chelsea in 2021

Personal information
- Full name: Jorge Luiz Frello Filho
- Date of birth: 20 December 1991 (age 34)
- Place of birth: Imbituba, Brazil
- Height: 1.80 m (5 ft 11 in)
- Position: Defensive midfielder

Team information
- Current team: Flamengo
- Number: 21

Youth career
- 2006–2007: Brusque
- 2007–2010: Hellas Verona

Senior career*
Years	Team	Apps	(Gls)
2010–2014	Hellas Verona	89	(11)
2010–2011	→ Sambonifacese (loan)	31	(1)
2014–2018	Napoli	133	(2)
2018–2023	Chelsea	143	(29)
2023–2025	Arsenal	53	(0)
2025–	Flamengo	47	(7)

International career^{‡}
2016–2024	Italy	57	(5)
Medal record
Men's Football
Representing Italy
UEFA European Championship
Winner	2020 Europe
UEFA Nations League
Third place	2021 Italy
Third place	2023 Netherlands
CONMEBOL–UEFA Cup of Champions
Runner-up	2022 England
- * Club domestic league appearances and goals as of 23:22, 21 November 2026 (UTC) ‡ National team caps and goals as of 19:10, 18 May 2025 (UTC)

Jorge Luiz Frello Filho Cavaliere OMRI (born 20 December 1991), known as Jorginho, is a professional footballer who plays as a defensive midfielder for Campeonato Brasileiro Série A club Flamengo. Born in Brazil, he represented the Italy national team. In 2021, he finished 3rd in the Ballon d’Or voting.

Born in Brazil, Jorginho moved to Italy at the age of 15, and began his professional career with the Hellas Verona youth team, before being promoted to the senior team. During the 2010–11 season, he was sent on loan to Sambonifacese. In January 2014, he moved to Napoli, where he soon after won the Coppa Italia and the Supercoppa Italiana. He totalled 160 games for the club before signing for Chelsea in 2018, where he won the UEFA Europa League in his first season, followed by the UEFA Champions League during the 2020–21 season. After four and a half years at Chelsea, Jorginho joined Arsenal in 2023 for a fee of £12 million.

At international level, he has represented Italy, making his senior debut in 2016, while his competitive debut came the following year. He was part of the Italy squad which won UEFA Euro 2020, and was named in the Team of the Tournament for his performances. In 2021, he was named UEFA Men's Player of the Year and is the only Italian player to ever win the award. He also placed third in voting for the Ballon d'Or.

== Early life ==
Jorge Luiz Frello Filho was born on 20 December 1991 in Imbituba in the Brazilian state of Santa Catarina but moved to Italy at the age of 15. He is of Italian descent through his paternal great-grandfather Giacomo Frello who is from Lusiana, Veneto, and thus earned Italian citizenship as a result.

He has credited his mother with encouraging his love of football. After discovering that he was being financially exploited by his agent while playing for the Verona youth team, Jorginho almost quit the game and wanted to move back to Brazil, but credits an emotional phone call with his mother for inspiring him to persist and continue playing.

His childhood idol was Romanian player Gheorghe Hagi, which led to his friends nicknaming him Haginho. He was also inspired by Ronaldo Nazario, Ronaldinho, Kaká, Andrea Pirlo and Xavi Hernández.

== Club career ==
=== Hellas Verona ===
Jorginho was a youth player of Hellas Verona. In June 2010, Jorginho was loaned out to Lega Pro Seconda Divisione club Sambonifacese, where he played his first full senior season for the Veneto club – appearing 31 times and scoring one goal while providing ten assists from his central midfield position.

He made his Verona debut on 4 September 2011, in a match against Sassuolo as a substitute in the 76th minute.

=== Napoli ===
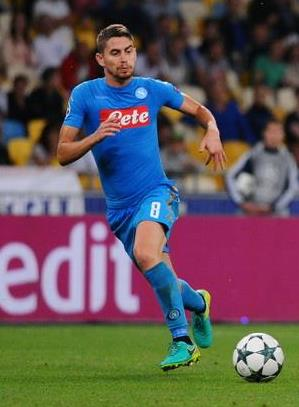
Jorginho playing for Napoli in 2016

On 18 January 2014, he joined Napoli in a co-ownership deal with Verona for four and a half years. On 12 February, he scored the last goal as Napoli overturned a 3–2 first-leg deficit to beat Roma and reach the 2014 Coppa Italia Final. In the final, on 3 May, Jorginho played the full 90 minutes as Napoli defeated Fiorentina 3–1.

In the 2014 Supercoppa Italiana in Doha on 22 December 2014, Jorginho entered the game against Juventus in the second half of extra time in place of Jonathan de Guzmán. He took Napoli's first spot-kick in the penalty shoot-out, and although Gianluigi Buffon saved it, Napoli were eventually victorious. While initially struggling to get into manager Rafael Benítez's line-up, Jorginho's fortunes changed with the appointment of Maurizio Sarri who was key to his development, deploying him in a deep-lying midfield role from which he could dictate play with his passing. In 2017–18, Jorginho had a breakthrough season with Napoli and was integral to their Serie A title challenge.

=== Chelsea ===
==== 2018–19 season ====
On 14 July 2018, Jorginho signed for English team Chelsea on a five-year contract on the same day as Sarri was hired at the club. He joined for an initial transfer fee of £50 million, potentially rising to £57 million in add-ons. According to Napoli president Aurelio De Laurentiis, he was previously close to joining Manchester City. Jorginho made his debut on 5 August in the 2018 FA Community Shield at Wembley Stadium against that very opponent, and was booed by City fans in Chelsea's 2–0 loss. Six days later, he played his first Premier League match, in which he scored a penalty in a 3–0 win at Huddersfield Town. In Chelsea's third league match of the campaign, a 2–1 win away at Newcastle United, Jorginho completed 158 passes, which was a new record for most successful passes by a Chelsea player in a single match in the Premier League, and the second all-time in the league, behind İlkay Gündoğan's 167 completed passes for Manchester City against Chelsea from the prior season. Jorginho went on to break the attempted passes record in Chelsea's sixth league match of the season on 23 September, attempting 180 passes in a 0–0 draw away at West Ham United, breaking the record of 173 attempted passes again set by Gündoğan in the same Manchester City–Chelsea match the year before. On 24 February 2019, following a 0–0 draw after extra-time in the 2019 EFL Cup final against cup holders Manchester City, Jorginho missed Chelsea's first penalty in the resulting shoot-out, which ultimately saw Manchester City triumph 4–3. On 29 May, Jorginho featured in Chelsea's 4–1 victory over Arsenal in the 2019 UEFA Europa League final.

==== 2019–20 season ====
In the 2019 UEFA Super Cup against Liverpool on 14 August, Jorginho scored the equalising goal from the penalty spot in extra-time an eventual 2–2 draw. The match subsequently went to a penalty shoot-out; although Jorginho was able to net Chelsea's first penalty, Liverpool ultimately won the shoot-out 5–4. He scored his first league goal of the season, also from the penalty spot, in a 2–0 home win over Brighton & Hove Albion on 28 September. On 5 November, he scored twice from the penalty spot as Chelsea came from behind to earn a 4–4 home draw against Ajax in the Champions League.

==== 2020–21 season ====
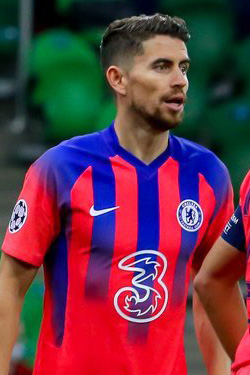
Jorginho playing for Chelsea in 2020

Jorginho scored Chelsea's first goal of the season from the penalty spot in an eventual 3–1 league win against Brighton & Hove Albion on 14 September at Falmer Stadium. On 20 September, Jorginho missed his first penalty for Chelsea in the same match in which he made his 100th appearance for the club; the game ended 2–0 to Liverpool. On 3 October, he scored two penalties as Chelsea ran out 4–0 winners at home to Crystal Palace. He also led the team in goals in the Premier League, all coming from penalties. On 29 May 2021, Jorginho won his first-ever Champions League with Chelsea, beating Manchester City 1–0 in the final.

==== 2021–22 season ====
Jorginho came on as a substitute during the 2021 UEFA Super Cup against Villarreal on 12 August, which Chelsea won 6–5 on penalties. He took and scored the fifth penalty in the shoot-out. On 26 August 2021, Jorginho was named UEFA Men's Player of the Year Award beating out his Chelsea teammate, and UEFA Men's Midfielder of the year, N'Golo Kanté, as well as Manchester City midfielder, Kevin De Bruyne.

On 8 October, Jorginho was one of five Chelsea players included in the final 30-man shortlist for the 2021 Ballon d'Or. On 30 October, he converted a penalty in a 3–0 win away to Newcastle. In doing so, he became the first player in Premier League history to have 10 consecutive goals from the penalty spot. On 29 November, he placed third in the Ballon d'Or, behind winner Lionel Messi and Robert Lewandowski.

Jorginho started for Chelsea in the 1–0 semi-final victory over Al-Hilal in the 2021 FIFA Club World Cup on 9 February 2022, playing the first-half before coming off for N'Golo Kanté. He was an unused substitute as Chelsea beat Palmeiras in the final three days later to claim the Club World Cup title for the first time in the club's history.

=== Arsenal ===
Jorginho joined Arsenal on 31 January 2023 for a fee of £12 million, signing a one-and-a-half-year contract with the option of a further year. He made his debut on 4 February as a 59th-minute substitute in Arsenal's 1–0 defeat away to Everton. On 18 February, Jorginho's 93rd minute strike against Aston Villa hit the crossbar and went in off of Emi Martínez' head, giving Arsenal a late 3–2 lead in a match they eventually won 4–2, after a three-game winless run. On 7 May, Jorginho provided an assist in Arsenal's 2–0 win away to Newcastle and was awarded Man of the Match for his influential performance.

On 29 November 2023, Jorginho scored his first goal for Arsenal, scoring a penalty as the final goal in a 6–0 victory over RC Lens in the Champions League. On 9 May 2024, Jorginho signed an extension to his contract with the club. On 27 May 2025, he announced his departure following two seasons with the club.

=== Flamengo ===
On 6 June 2025, Jorginho signed for Campeonato Brasileiro Série A club Flamengo on a contract until July 2028 ahead of their FIFA Club World Cup campaign. He scored his first goal for Flamengo from the penalty spot in the FIFA Club World Cup against Bayern Munich on 29 June 2025.

== International career ==
As Jorginho holds both Italian and Brazilian citizenship, he was eligible to play for both the Italian and Brazilian national teams. In 2012, he was called up for the first time for Italy U21, however; he did not play.

In 2014, Jorginho expressed his desire to represent Italy rather than Brazil internationally, and he received his first call up to the Italy senior squad in March 2016, under manager Antonio Conte, for the team's international friendlies against Spain and Germany. He made his international debut for Italy on 24 March, coming on as a last-minute substitute for Marco Parolo in a 1–1 draw against Spain at the Stadio Friuli in Udine. After initially being included in Conte's preliminary 30-man squad for UEFA Euro 2016, on 31 May, Jorginho was later excluded from the final 23-man squad.

Despite his positive club form for Napoli, Jorginho was not initially called up to the Italian side under Conte's successor, Gian Piero Ventura. Although rumours circled in the media regarding the possibility of Brazil's coach Tite calling Jorginho up to his squad in autumn 2017, as he had not yet appeared for Italy in a competitive match, Jorginho denied rumours that he wanted to switch to the Brazilian national team. He later made his first competitive appearance for Italy under manager Ventura in a 0–0 home draw against Sweden on 13 November, in the second leg of the 2018 FIFA World Cup play-offs against Sweden, at the San Siro in Milan; however, Italy's 1–0 away loss in the first leg on 10 November saw Sweden advance on aggregate, meaning that Italy had failed to qualify for the World Cup for the first time in 60 years.

On 7 September 2018, in Italy's first UEFA Nations League match at home to Poland in Bologna, Jorginho scored his first international goal from the penalty spot to secure a 1–1 draw. On 8 September 2019, he scored his second international goal, from the penalty spot once again, in a 2–1 away win over Finland, in a Euro 2020 qualifier. On 12 October, Jorginho scored his third international goal, once again from the penalty spot, in a 2–0 home win over Greece, which sealed Italy's qualification for Euro 2020. He scored his fourth international goal from the penalty spot once again on 18 November, in a 9–1 home win over Armenia in Italy's final Euro 2020 qualifier, also assisting Nicolò Zaniolo's second goal during the match.

In June 2021, he was included in Italy's squad for Euro 2020 by manager Roberto Mancini. On 6 July, following a 1–1 draw after extra-time against Spain in the semi-final of the competition, Jorginho scored the decisive penalty kick in the resulting shoot-out to send Italy to the final; during the match, he completed a tournament high of eight interceptions. In the final on 11 July against England at Wembley Stadium, after a 1–1 draw following extra time, his spot-kick was saved in the penalty shootout by Jordan Pickford, but Italy would go on to win 3–2 in the shootout after Bukayo Saka missed his penalty. Throughout the tournament, he covered the most ground of any player (86.6 kilometres (53.8 mi) in total), made the most recoveries alongside Manuel Akanji (46), and completed the second most passes of any player after Aymeric Laporte (497 out of 529 attempted, with a 93% passing accuracy); he also won the most fouls (19) and made the most interceptions (25) of any other player, breaking Marcel Desailly's record of 24 interceptions in a single tournament from UEFA Euro 1996, since these statistics first began to be recorded at UEFA Euro 1980. For his performances, he was included in the team of the tournament.

On 12 November 2021, Jorginho missed a crucial penalty during a 2022 FIFA World Cup qualifying match against Switzerland. The game ended in a 1–1 draw and Italy finished as runners-up in their qualifying group behind Switzerland, meaning they would have to qualify for the World Cup through the play-offs; had he converted the spot kick, Italy would have qualified automatically. On 24 March 2022, Italy lost the play-off semi-final 1–0 to North Macedonia and failed to qualify for a second successive World Cup, with Jorginho playing all 90 minutes of the match.

Jorginho was named in Italy's 26-man squad for UEFA Euro 2024 by manager Luciano Spalletti. As defending champions, Italy were knocked out in the Round of 16 by Switzerland, which turned out to be Jorginho's last match for Italy. He was named in Roberto Mancini's preliminary squad for the 2026–27 UEFA Nations League, but did not make the final cut.

== Player profile ==
=== Style of play ===
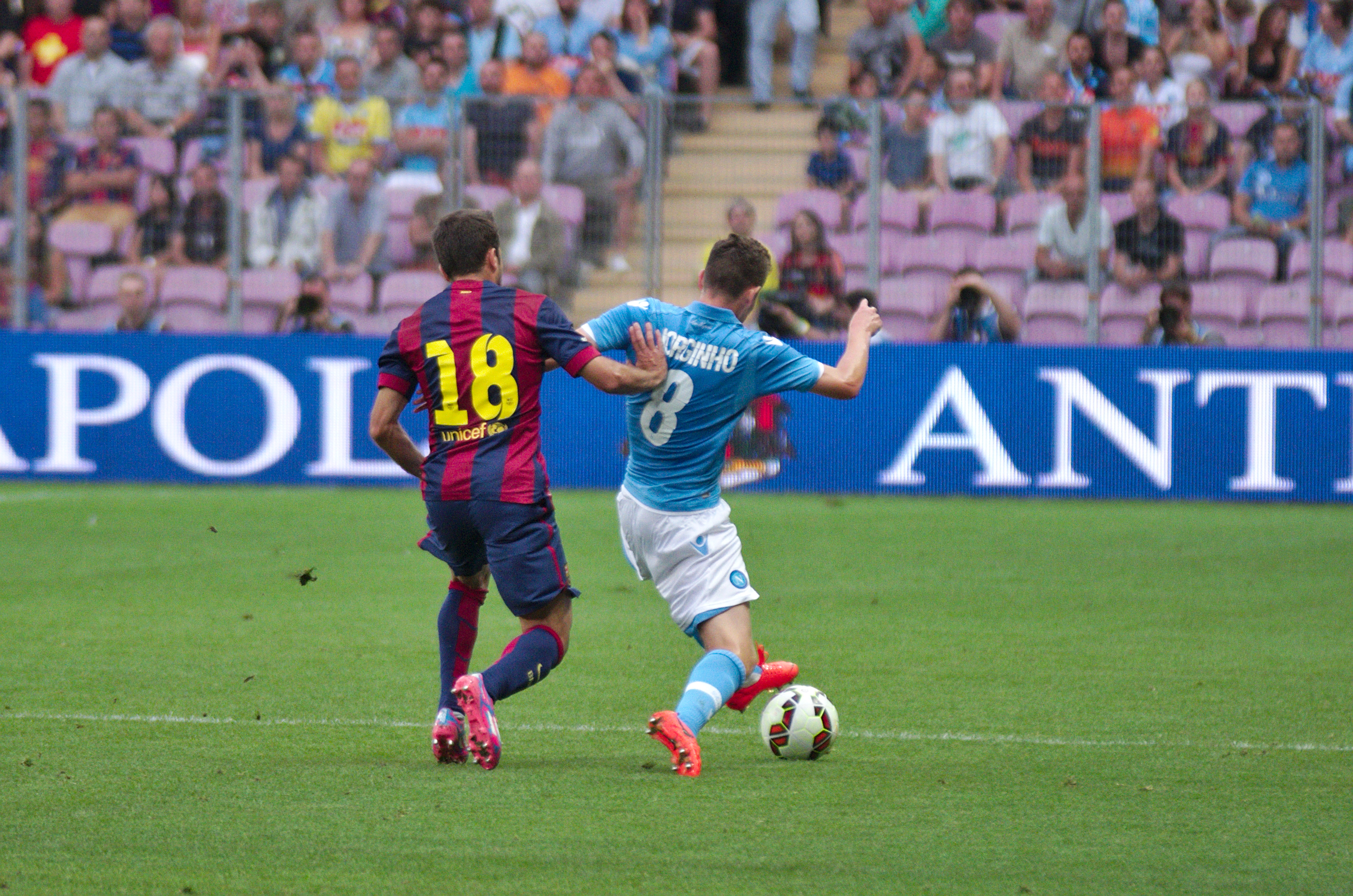
Jorginho playing for Napoli in 2014

Jorginho is known for his composure and versatility as a footballer, which allows him to be fielded in any midfield position. Due to his work-rate, technique, football intelligence, ability to break down possession, vision, and passing accuracy, he is usually deployed as central midfielder in a three-man midfield in a 4–3–3 formation. Although he is not imposing physically, due to his slender build and average height, he is also capable of playing both in a box-to-box role or in a defensive midfield role as a ball winner, courtesy of his tactical intelligence, positional sense, awareness, and ability to read the game, which enables him to cover ground, press opponents further up the pitch to retrieve the ball, intercept passes, and start attacking plays after winning back the ball. However, he usually operates in a more withdrawn creative role, as a deep-lying playmaker in front of the back-line, a position known as the regista role in Italian football jargon, which allows him more time on the ball to control the tempo of his team's play with his short, precise, horizontal passing game on the ground. Despite not being particularly quick and lacking significant pace, he is also known for his movement off the ball and ability to lose his markers, which allows him to find gaps from where he can receive his teammates' passes and link-up with them in tight spaces.

His role has also been likened to that of a metodista ("centre-half," in Italian football jargon), due to his ability to dictate play in midfield as well as assist his team defensively, in a similar manner to Xabi Alonso or Sergio Busquets. Although he is not known for his offensive capabilities, and has occasionally drawn criticism over his goalscoring and assist record, he is also an accurate penalty taker, who often performs trademark hop when taking spot kicks, with most of his goals coming from the penalty spot.

Jorginho cites Andrea Pirlo, Xavi, Ronaldo, and Ronaldinho as his footballing inspirations. He also admired Gheorghe Hagi in his youth.

=== Reception ===
Jorginho's nicknamed 'Il Professore' ('The Professor,' in Italian) or 'Radio Jorginho' by the players of the Italian national team, in reference to his leadership and organizational qualities, as well as for the way he directs the team and continuously talks during games.

For his performances with Chelsea and the Italian team in the 2021 season, Jorginho won UEFA Player of the Year. His Chelsea manager Thomas Tuchel described him as one of "the very best midfielders in the world."

== Personal life ==
Jorginho married Natalia Leteri in 2017 and had two children. They divorced in 2019.

In 2019, Jorginho began a relationship with Irish singer Catherine Harding. They welcomed a son in 2020 and married in 2025, at Villa Erba on Lake Como in Italy. Upon their marriage, Jorginho became stepfather to Harding's daughter with Jude Law.

In March 2026, Jorginho accused a bodyguard allegedly working for singer Chappell Roan of speaking aggressively to his wife and stepdaughter (Law's daughter) at a São Paulo hotel after the stepdaughter had walked past the singer. The mayor of Rio de Janeiro, Eduardo Cavaliere, then banned Roan from performing at the Todo Mundo no Rio festival. Roan stated she was unaware of the events and the bodyguard in question was not working for her. The bodyguard later confirmed he did not work for Roan and took responsibility for the incident. Following the responses of Roan and the security guard involved, Jorginho publicly retracted his prior comments and condemned the hate speech targeted towards Roan in the aftermath of his initial statement.

== Career statistics ==
=== Club ===
As of match played 21 November 2026

Appearances and goals by club, season and competition
Club	Season	League			National cup (Note: Includes Coppa Italia, FA Cup, Copa do Brasil)		League cup (Note: Includes EFL Cup)		Continental		Other		Total	
Club	Season	Division	Apps	Goals	Apps	Goals	Apps	Goals	Apps	Goals	Apps	Goals	Apps	Goals
Sambonifacese	2010–11	Lega Pro Seconda Divisione	31	1	—		—		—		—		31	1
Hellas Verona	2011–12	Serie B	30	2	1	0	—		—		2 (Note: Appearances in Serie B promotion play-offs)	0	33	2
Hellas Verona	2012–13	Serie B	41	2	3	0	—		—		—		44	2
Hellas Verona	2013–14	Serie A	18	7	1	0	—		—		—		19	7
Hellas Verona	Total		89	11	5	0	—		—		2	0	96	11
Napoli	2013–14	Serie A	15	0	4	1	—		—		—		19	1
Napoli	2014–15	Serie A	23	0	1	1	—		8 (Note: Two appearances in UEFA Champions League, six appearances in UEFA Europa League)	0	1 (Note: Appearance in Supercoppa Italiana)	0	33	1
Napoli	2015–16	Serie A	35	0	1	0	—		2 (Note: Appearances in UEFA Europa League)	0	—		38	0
Napoli	2016–17	Serie A	27	0	0	0	—		4 (Note: Appearances in UEFA Champions League)	0	—		31	0
Napoli	2017–18	Serie A	33	2	1	0	—		5 (Note: Four appearances and two goals in UEFA Champions League, one appearance in UEFA Europa League)	2	—		39	4
Napoli	Total		133	2	7	2	—		19	2	1	0	160	6
Chelsea	2018–19	Premier League	37	2	2	0	3	0	11	0	1 (Note: Appearance in FA Community Shield)	0	54	2
Chelsea	2019–20	Premier League	31	4	4	0	1	0	7	2	1 (Note: Appearance in UEFA Super Cup)	1	44	7
Chelsea	2020–21	Premier League	28	7	2	0	1	0	12	1	—		43	8
Chelsea	2021–22	Premier League	29	6	4	0	4	1	8	2	2 (Note: One appearance in UEFA Super Cup, one appearance in FIFA Club World Cup)	0	47	9
Chelsea	2022–23	Premier League	18	2	1	0	0	0	6	1	—		25	3
Chelsea	Total		143	21	13	0	9	1	44	6	4	1	213	29
Arsenal	2022–23	Premier League	14	0	—		—		2	0	—		16	0
Arsenal	2023–24	Premier League	24	0	1	0	2	0	9	1	0	0	36	1
Arsenal	2024–25	Premier League	15	0	1	0	5	0	6	1	—		27	1
Arsenal	Total		53	0	2	0	7	0	17	2	0	0	79	2
Flamengo	2025	Série A	17	3	1	0	—		6 (Note: Appearances in Copa Libertadores)	0	7 (Note: Four appearances and one goal in FIFA Club World Cup, three appearances and one goal in FIFA Intercontinental Cup)	2	31	5
Flamengo	2026	Série A	29	4	1	0	—		7	0	3 (Note: One appearance in Supercopa do Brasil, one appearance and one goal in Recopa Sudamericana, one appearance in Campeonato Carioca)	1	40	5
Flamengo	Total		46	7	2	0	—		13	0	10	3	71	10
Career total			495	42	29	2	16	1	93	10	17	4	650	59

=== International ===
As of match played 24 June 2024

Appearances and goals by national team and year
National team	Year	Apps	Goals
Italy	2016	2	0
Italy	2017	1	0
Italy	2018	10	1
Italy	2019	9	3
Italy	2020	5	1
Italy	2021	15	0
Italy	2022	4	0
Italy	2023	4	0
Italy	2024	7	0
Total		57	5

As of match played 24 June 2024
Scores and results list Italy's goal tally first, score column indicates score after each Jorginho goal.

List of international goals scored by Jorginho
No.	Date	Venue	Cap	Opponent	Score	Result	Competition	Ref.
1	7 September 2018	Stadio Renato Dall'Ara, Bologna, Italy	9	Poland	1–1	1–1	2018–19 UEFA Nations League A	
2	8 September 2019	Tampere Stadium, Tampere, Finland	19	Finland	2–1	2–1	UEFA Euro 2020 qualifying	
3	12 October 2019	Stadio Olimpico, Rome, Italy	20	Greece	1–0	2–0	UEFA Euro 2020 qualifying	
4	18 November 2019	Stadio Renzo Barbera, Palermo, Italy	22	Armenia	7–0	9–1	UEFA Euro 2020 qualifying	
5	15 November 2020	Mapei Stadium – Città del Tricolore, Reggio Emilia, Italy	26	Poland	1–0	2–0	2020–21 UEFA Nations League A	

== Honours ==
Napoli

- Coppa Italia: 2013–14
- Supercoppa Italiana: 2014

Chelsea

- UEFA Champions League: 2020–21
- UEFA Europa League: 2018–19
- UEFA Super Cup: 2021
- FIFA Club World Cup: 2021
- FA Cup runner-up: 2019–20, 2020–21, 2021–22
- EFL Cup runner-up: 2018–19, 2021–22

Flamengo

- FIFA Challenger Cup: 2025
- FIFA Derby of the Americas: 2025
- Copa Libertadores: 2025
- Campeonato Brasileiro Série A: 2025, 2026
- Campeonato Carioca: 2026

Italy

- UEFA European Championship: 2020
- UEFA Nations League third place: 2020–21, 2022–23

Individual

- UEFA Men's Player of the Year: 2020–21
- Ballon d'Or third place: 2021
- UEFA Europa League Squad of the Season: 2018–19
- UEFA Champions League Squad of the Season: 2020–21
- UEFA European Championship Team of the Tournament: 2020
- IFFHS World Team: 2021
- FIFA FIFPro World11: 2021
- Campeonato Brasileiro Série A Team of the Year: 2025

=== Orders ===
- Knight of the Order of Merit of the Italian Republic: 2021
