= Nenê (footballer, born 1983) =

Brazilian footballer

Personal information
- Full name: Ânderson Miguel da Silva
- Date of birth: 28 July 1983 (age 43)
- Place of birth: São Paulo, Brazil
- Height: 1.83 m (6 ft 0 in)
- Position: Striker

Senior career*
Years	Team	Apps	(Gls)
2003–2004	São Bento		
2004	Guaçuano		
2005	Riachuelo	28	(14)
2005	Boca Júnior	0	(0)
2006	América-SP		
2006	Confiança		
2006	Santa Cruz	30	(9)
2007–2008	Cruzeiro	14	(2)
2008	→ Ipatinga (loan)	29	(9)
2008–2009	Nacional	28	(20)
2009–2014	Cagliari	124	(23)
2014–2015	Verona	8	(0)
2015	→ Spezia (loan)	17	(4)
2015–2017	Spezia	48	(16)
2017–2018	Bari	25	(7)
2018–2020	Moreirense	52	(7)
2020–2021	Leixões	34	(10)
2021–2023	Vilafranquense	57	(28)
2023–2026	AVS	71	(31)
- * Club domestic league appearances and goals as of 21:37, 26 April 2026 (UTC)

Ânderson Miguel da Silva (born 28 July 1983), known as Nenê, is a Brazilian professional footballer who plays as a striker.

After being crowned the Portuguese Primeira Liga's top scorer in the 2008–09 season, he went on to spend most of his extensive career in that country and Italy, representing several clubs.

== Club career ==
Born in São Paulo, Nenê began his career with modest Brazilian clubs, also having a spell at Cruzeiro Esporte Clube, then moved abroad to Portugal's C.D. Nacional in July 2008. In his first season in the Primeira Liga he turned in stellar performances, leading the scoring charts with 20 goals (22 overall) by notably netting in home fixtures against Sporting CP (1–1) and S.L. Benfica (3–1 win), while also helping the Madeira team to reach the semi-finals of the Taça de Portugal and qualify for the UEFA Europa League.

In June 2009, Nenê joined Cagliari Calcio on a four-year contract for about €4.5 million, with the player reported to be earning approximately €450,000 per season. He spent his debut campaign in the Italian Serie A alternating between the starting XI and the substitutes bench, but still scored eight goals – second-best in the squad – as the Sardinia club narrowly avoided relegation.

Nenê scored a hat-trick in a 3–0 home win over Calcio Catania on 12 December 2010. In July 2013, aged 30, he renewed his contract for another year.

On 25 July 2014, after five seasons and an average of less than five league goals, the free agent Nenê signed for fellow top-tier side Hellas Verona FC. Late into the following January transfer window he was loaned to Spezia Calcio of Serie B, with the move being made permanent in the summer. He remained at the Stadio Alberto Picco until July 2017, when he joined A.S. Bari in the same division.

Nenê returned to Portugal's top flight on 8 August 2018 after eight years away, agreeing to a one-year deal at Moreirense F.C. with the option of a further campaign. The following March, this clause was activated.

Nenê then took his game to the Liga Portugal 2, continuing to score at an excellent rate for Leixões S.C. and U.D. Vilafranquense (renamed AVS Futebol SAD in 2023 following a merger). He achieved promotion with the latter at the end of 2023–24, while being crowned top scorer at 23 goals.

On 30 March 2025, Nenê netted in a 4–1 away loss to F.C. Famalicão; in the process, aged 41 years, 8 months and 2 days, he became the second-oldest player to achieve this feat in the Portuguese main division after surpassing José Torres.

== Honours ==
Individual

- Primeira Liga top scorer: 2008–09 (20 goals)
- Liga Portugal 2 top scorer: 2023–24 (23 goals)
- Liga Portugal 2 Player of the Month: September 2022, December 2023, January 2024
- Liga Portugal 2 Forward of the Month: September 2022, December 2023, January 2024
