= Jacopo Sala =

Italian footballer

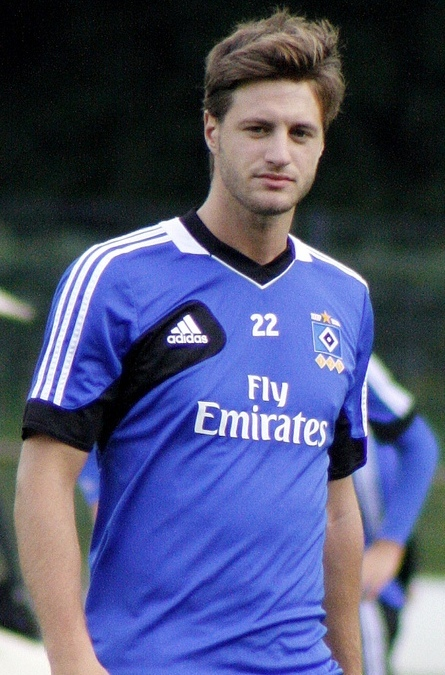
- Sala at practice with Hamburger SV in 2012

Personal information
- Date of birth: 5 December 1991 (age 34)
- Place of birth: Alzano Lombardo, Bergamo, Italy
- Height: 1.81 m (5 ft 11 in)
- Position: Midfielder

Youth career
- –1999: Virtus Oratorio Gazzaniga
- 1999–2001: AlbinoLeffe
- 2001–2007: Atalanta
- 2007–2011: Chelsea

Senior career*
Years	Team	Apps	(Gls)
2011–2013	Hamburger SV II	5	(1)
2011–2013	Hamburger SV	21	(1)
2013–2016	Hellas Verona	49	(3)
2016	→ Sampdoria (loan)	5	(0)
2016–2019	Sampdoria	54	(0)
2019–2020	SPAL	16	(0)
2020–2023	Spezia	30	(1)
2024	Rimini	15	(0)

International career^{‡}
2006	Italy U-16	9	(0)
2007–2008	Italy U-17	8	(1)
2009–2011	Italy U-19	13	(0)
2012–2014	Italy U-21	6	(1)
- * Club domestic league appearances and goals as of 4 May 2024 ‡ National team caps and goals as of 28 July 2015

Jacopo Sala (Italian pronunciation: [ˈjaːkopo ˈsaːla]; born 5 December 1991) is an Italian professional footballer who plays as a midfielder.

== Club career ==
=== Hamburger SV ===
Sala came to German side Hamburger SV from Chelsea on a three-year contract, joining former Chelsea teammate Michael Mancienne at the club. He made his competitive debut for Hamburg in a 5–1 home defeat against Borussia Dortmund; he came on as a substitute in the 65th minute, replacing Marcell Jansen.

=== Hellas Verona ===
On 24 July 2013, he joined Hellas Verona. Sala made his debut on 1 September 2013, against Roma; the match ended in a 3–0 defeat for Verona.

=== Sampdoria ===
On 30 January 2016, Sala joined Sampdoria on loan with an obligation to buy.

=== SPAL ===
On 2 September 2019, Sala signed to SPAL.

=== Spezia ===
On 5 September 2020, Sala signed to Spezia a 2-years contract. He was the first deal for Spezia in Serie A. On 1 September 2023, his contract with Spezia was terminated by mutual consent.

=== Rimini ===
On 22 January 2024, Sala joined Rimini in Serie C on a contract until June 2025.

== International career ==
On 15 August 2012, Sala made his debut with the Italy U-21 team in a friendly match against the Netherlands.

== Career statistics ==
As of match played 22 May 2022

Appearances and goals by club, season and competition
Club	Season	League			National cup		Continental		Other		Total	
Club	Season	Division	Apps	Goals	Apps	Goals	Apps	Goals	Apps	Goals	Apps	Goals
Hamburger SV	2011–12	Bundesliga	13	1	0	0	—		—		13	1
Hamburger SV	2012–13	Bundesliga	8	0	0	0	—		—		8	0
Hamburger SV	Total		21	1	0	0	0	0	0	0	21	1
Hamburger SV II	2011–12	Regionalliga	2	0	0	0	—		—		2	0
Hamburger SV II	2012–13	Regionalliga	3	1	0	0	—		—		3	1
Hamburger SV II	Total		5	1	0	0	0	0	0	0	5	1
Hellas Verona	2013–14	Serie A	15	1	2	0	—		—		17	1
Hellas Verona	2014–15	Serie A	16	2	0	0	—		—		16	2
Hellas Verona	2015–16	Serie A	18	0	1	0	—		—		19	0
Hellas Verona	Total		49	3	3	0	0	0	0	0	52	3
Sampdoria (loan)	2015–16	Serie A	5	0	0	0	—		—		5	0
Sampdoria	2016–17	Serie A	20	0	1	0	—		—		21	0
Sampdoria	2017–18	Serie A	13	0	3	0	—		—		16	0
Sampdoria	2018–19	Serie A	21	0	3	0	—		—		24	0
Sampdoria	Total		54	0	7	0	0	0	0	0	61	0
SPAL	2019–20	Serie A	16	0	0	0	—		—		16	0
Spezia	2020–21	Serie A	6	0	1	0	—		—		7	0
Spezia	2021–22	Serie A	18	1	1	0	—		—		19	1
Spezia	Total		24	1	2	0	0	0	0	0	26	1
Career total			174	6	12	0	0	0	0	0	186	6
