= Boško Janković =

Serbian footballer (born 1984)

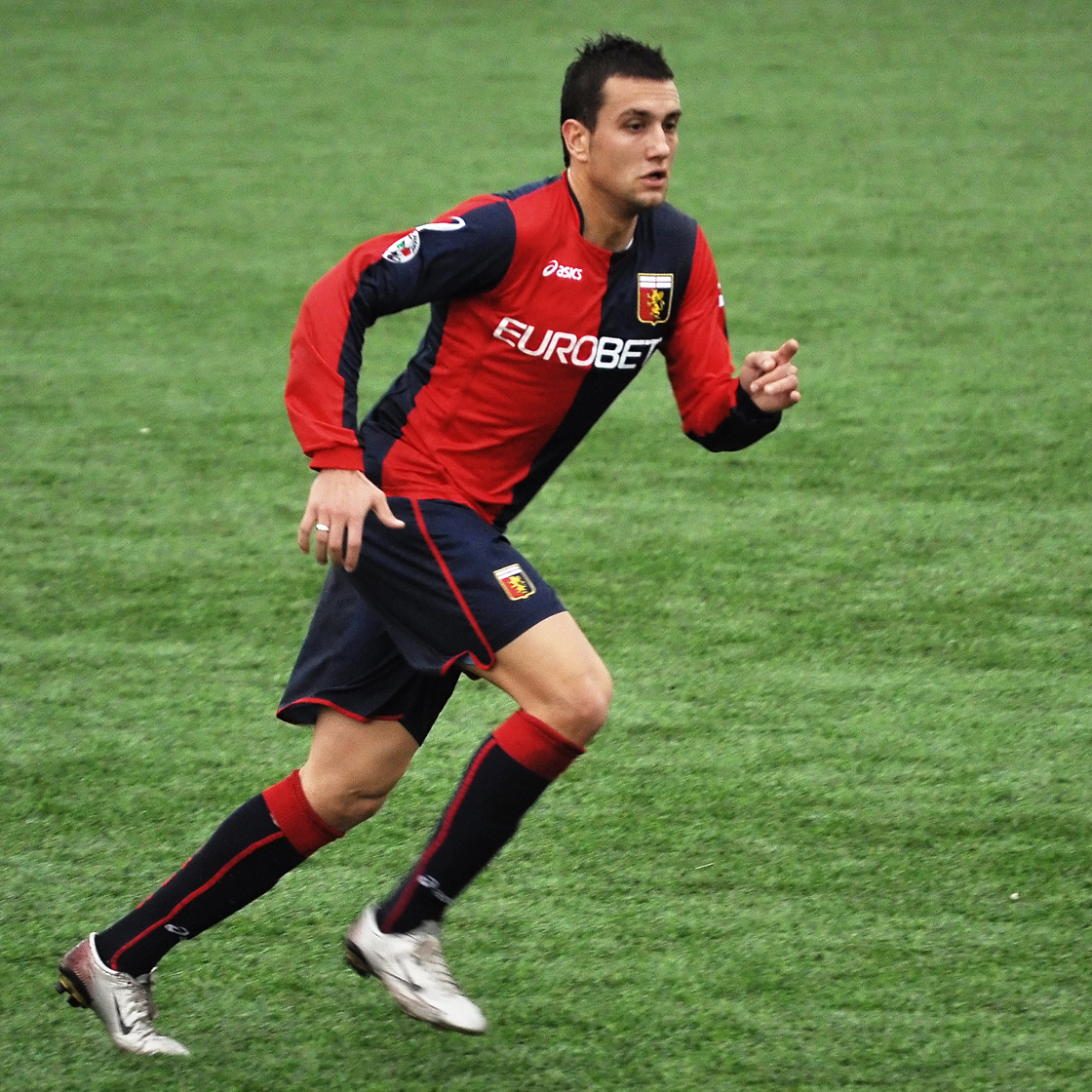
- Janković with Genoa in 2009

Personal information
- Full name: Boško Janković
- Date of birth: 1 March 1984 (age 42)
- Place of birth: Belgrade, SFR Yugoslavia
- Height: 1.83 m (6 ft 0 in)
- Positions: Attacking midfielder; winger

Youth career
- Red Star Belgrade

Senior career*
Years	Team	Apps	(Gls)
2002–2006	Red Star Belgrade	74	(24)
2003–2004	→ Jedinstvo Ub (loan)	28	(21)
2006–2007	Mallorca	28	(9)
2007–2008	Palermo	27	(2)
2008–2013	Genoa	83	(14)
2013–2016	Verona	51	(4)
Total		263	(53)

International career
2004–2007	Serbia U21	23	(8)
2006–2012	Serbia	31	(5)
Medal record
Silver medal – second place	UEFA Under-21 Championship	2004
Silver medal – second place	UEFA Under-21 Championship	2007
- * Club domestic league appearances and goals

Boško Janković (Serbian Cyrillic: Бошко Јанковић; born 1 March 1984) is a Serbian former footballer who played as a winger for the Serbia national football team. As an attacking minded player, he had the tendency to take long shots and free kicks.

== Club career ==
=== Red Star Belgrade ===
Having gone through all age groups in the Red Star Belgrade youth setup, an 18-year-old Janković earned his first taste of full squad action throughout fall 2002, during the first half of the 2002–03 season under head coach Zoran Filipović.

However, over the winter 2002–03 break in January 2003, Janković was loaned out to lower division side Jedinstvo Ub along with Dušan Basta and Aleksandar Luković in order to gain experience through regular playing time. Over the next season and a half in Ub, he excelled in an attacking midfielder position, scoring 21 league goals in 28 matches. At the beginning of 2003–04 league season, Jankovic along with a group of other Red Star youth players was registered both for Red Star and Jedinstvo, which in practice meant that he trained with Red Star during the week while playing league matches for Jedinstvo on Saturdays. However, following the winter break, head coach Slavoljub Muslin decided to discontinue this practice, making the players both train and play with Jedinstvo.

All the success prompted new head coach Ljupko Petrović and the rest in Red Star management to bring Janković back during summer 2004, ahead of the 2004–05 season. The move paid immediate dividends as he scored a spectacular free kick goal versus PSV Eindhoven in the first leg of UEFA Champions League third qualifying round. He followed that up with a notable domestic season in which he scored 10 goals in 25 appearances, showing early signs of the things to come and establishing himself as one of the more important players on the league winning Red Star roster.

Janković truly came into his own throughout the 2005–06 season under head coach Walter Zenga, increasing his league scoring output to 12 goals in 26 appearances while also providing steady service from the right wing to Red Star strikers, most notably Nikola Žigić. At the end of the 2005–06 season, Janković was named Player of the Year.

By this time, he also became a staple in the Serbia-Montenegro under-21 national team with all the exposure leading to increased interest in Janković from abroad. As a result, rumors of a summer 2006 sale became persistent. Still, he started the 2006–07 league season with Red Star, however after only one match, Janković was sold to RCD Mallorca in August 2006 for €3 million.

=== Mallorca ===
The 23-year-old's excellent form shown during the 2006–07 season with Mallorca has caught the attention of both FC Barcelona and Valencia CF, but Janković played down the rumors and suggested he wanted to stay a year or two at Mallorca before making a move for one of the major clubs. In his first season with Mallorca, Jankovic was able to score 9 league goals in 28 appearances being himself the top scorer of the team. Chelsea were rumored to be very interested in the youngster and some scouts appeared at the Under 21 Championship Final to watch him.

However, on 28 June Italian Serie A club Palermo announced they have signed the Serbian midfielder to a five-year deal. The transfer fee paid to Mallorca was said to be €8 million.

=== Palermo ===
Janković made his scoring debut for Palermo in the UEFA Cup match, but his debut season in Sicily was a disappointment, as he rarely got opportunities to prove himself in the first half of the season, though his playing time and quality of play improved somewhat during the second half of the season.

=== Genoa ===
On 1 September 2008, he signed for Genoa on loan from Palermo.

In the summer of 2009, Genoa reportedly exercised a clause in his loan contract to buy full ownership of the player and thus make the deal a permanent one. However, Janković got injured at the start of the season after making only three league appearances. He played for Genoa until summer 2013. when he completed his transfer to Verona.

== International career ==
Janković played for Serbia U21 in the 2007 UEFA European Under-21 Championship where he scored a goal against the Czech Republic in Serbia's second group B match. Serbia finished in second place in the tournament with Janković named in the UEFA Team of the Tournament.

Janković scored his first goal for Serbia against Portugal in a Euro 2008 qualifying match on 28 March 2007. He then followed up with another goal versus Finland in another Euro 2008 qualifying match on 2 June 2007.

Although a regular, Janković missed out on the 2010 FIFA World Cup due to injury.

He amassed a total of 31 caps, scoring 5 goals. His final international was a May 2012 friendly match away against France.

== Career statistics ==
=== Club ===
As of end of 2015–16 season

Club	Season	League		Cup		Europe		Total	
Club	Season	Apps	Goals	Apps	Goals	Apps	Goals	Apps	Goals
Red Star Belgrade	2002–03	14	3	1	1	0	0	15	4
Red Star Belgrade	2003–04	4	0	2	0	1	0	7	0
Red Star Belgrade	2004–05	28	9	4	1	6	1	38	11
Red Star Belgrade	2005–06	26	12	2	0	7	1	35	13
Red Star Belgrade	2006–07	2	0	0	0	4	0	6	0
Red Star Belgrade	Total	74	24	9	2	18	2	101	28
Jedinstvo Ub (loan)	2003–04	28	21			—		28	21
Mallorca	2006–07	28	9	4	2	—		32	11
Palermo	2007–08	26	2	2	0	2	1	30	3
Palermo	2008–09	1	0	0	0	—		1	0
Palermo	Total	27	2	2	0	2	1	31	3
Genoa	2008–09	25	4	1	0	—		26	4
Genoa	2009–10	3	0	0	0	—		3	0
Genoa	2010–11	6	0	1	0	—		7	0
Genoa	2011–12	30	6	1	0	—		31	6
Genoa	2012–13	19	4	1	0	—		20	4
Genoa	Total	83	14	4	0	—		87	14
Verona	2013–14	18	2	1	0	—		19	2
Verona	2014–15	18	1	1	0	—		19	1
Verona	2015–16	15	1	3	1	—		18	2
Verona	Total	51	4	5	1	—		56	5
Career total		263	53	24	5	20	3	307	61

=== International ===
Serbia national team
Year	Apps	Goals
2006	1	0
2007	9	3
2008	9	1
2009	5	1
2010	1	0
2011	3	0
2012	3	0
Total	31	5

==== International goals ====
#	Date	Venue	Opponent	Score	Result	Competition
1.	28 March 2007	Stadion Crvena Zvezda, Beograd, Serbia	Portugal	1–1	1–1	UEFA Euro 2008 qualifying
2.	2 Jun 2007	Helsinki Olympic Stadium, Helsinki, Finland	Finland	0–1	0–2	UEFA Euro 2008 qualifying
3.	17 October 2007	Tofik Bakhramov Stadium, Baku, Azerbaijan	Azerbaijan	1–3	1–6	UEFA Euro 2008 qualifying
4.	31 May 2008	Arena AufSchalke, Gelsenkirchen, Germany	Germany	0–1	2–1	Friendly
5.	1 April 2009	Stadion Partizan, Beograd, Serbia	Sweden	2–0	2–0	Friendly

== Honours ==
Red Star Belgrade

- First League of Serbia and Montenegro: 2005–06
- Serbia and Montenegro Cup: 2005–06
