= Alessandro Agostini =

Italian footballer (born 1979)

Personal information
- Date of birth: 23 July 1979 (age 47)
- Place of birth: Vinci, Italy
- Height: 1.74 m (5 ft 8 1/2 in)
- Position: Left back

Youth career
- Fiorentina

Senior career*
Years	Team	Apps	(Gls)
1996–2002	Fiorentina	13	(0)
1998–2000	→ Pistoiese (loan)	33	(0)
2000–2001	→ Ternana (loan)	34	(0)
2002–2004	Empoli	11	(0)
2003	→ Siena (loan)	11	(0)
2004	→ Cagliari (loan)	15	(0)
2004–2012	Cagliari	266	(0)
2012–2013	Torino	0	(0)
2013	→ Hellas Verona (loan)	13	(0)
2013–2015	Hellas Verona	47	(0)
Total		434	(0)

Managerial career
- 2022: Cagliari (caretaker)
- 2024: Pontedera
- * Club domestic league appearances and goals

Alessandro Agostini (born 23 July 1979) is an Italian football coach and a former player who played as a left-back.

== Playing career ==
Agostini joined Cagliari in January 2004. He renewed his contract in 2006 (to 2009); in 2008 (to 2011).

== Coaching career ==
He was appointed head coach of the Under-19 squad of Cagliari for the 2020–21 season. In July 2021, he obtained a UEFA A coaching license.

On 2 May 2022, following Walter Mazzarri's dismissal from his role as Cagliari head coach with three games to go, Agostini was appointed caretaker manager in an attempt to overturn the club's fortunes. However, Agostini failed to save Cagliari from relegation, and left the position by the end of the season after the club chose to appoint Fabio Liverani as their new permanent manager. He mutually rescinded his contract with Cagliari shortly thereafter.

On 6 January 2023, Agostini was announced as the new Under-19 youth coach of Genoa, replacing Alberto Gilardino following the appointment of the latter as the new first-team head coach.

On 5 June 2024, Agostini was named head coach of Serie C club Pontedera. He was sacked on 5 October 2024 after a negative start of the season.
