= 2013–14 US Città di Palermo season =

U.S. Città di Palermo
2013–14 season
- Chairman: Maurizio Zamparini
- Head coach: Gennaro Gattuso (September 2013); Giuseppe Iachini
- Stadium: Stadio Renzo Barbera
- Serie B: 1st (champions, promoted to Serie A)
- Coppa Italia: Third round
Home colours	Away colours	Third colours

U.S. Città di Palermo played the 2013–14 football season in Serie B, the first appearance in the second tier after relegation in the 2012–13 Serie A season following nine consecutive seasons in the top flight. The season ended with the club ensuring direct promotion back to Serie A at its first attempt.

== Review and events ==
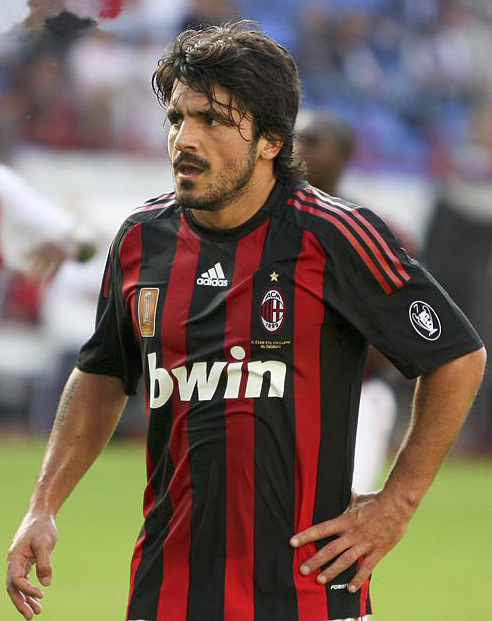
Gennaro Gattuso was appointed as Palermo head coach for the season, in his first full managerial role in career.

After completing the 2012–13 Serie A season in 18th place and being thus relegated into Serie B, club chairman Maurizio Zamparini announced the confirmation of Giorgio Perinetti as director of football and also stated his intention to keep Giuseppe Sannino as head coach in order to set an immediate attempt to return to the top flight. However, an agreement was not found between Sannino (who ultimately left Palermo to accept a head coaching role at Serie A's Chievo) and the rosanero club, and a search for a new head coach was started. Such search ended with the appointment of Gennaro Gattuso as new head coach; a former international midfielder, 2006 FIFA World Cup winner with Italy and UEFA Champions League winner with Milan among all things, Gattuso had only a short player-coach stint at FC Sion in the previous season in terms of managerial experience and his choice was hailed with surprise.

This was followed by Palermo's first summer signing, Northern Ireland international striker Kyle Lafferty from Gattuso's former team FC Sion. Another signing, deep-lying forward Davide Di Gennaro from Spezia, was announced on 1 July. The following day, the club announced to have sold half of Jasmin Kurtić's transfer rights to Sassuolo, with winger Gennaro Troianello coming to Sicily as part of the same deal.

Palermo also acquired the full ownerships of players Anselmo – who was then released after being deemed surplus to requirements – and Eros Pisano, who were both co-owned with Genoa. On the other hand, club captain Fabrizio Miccoli left the club at the expiration of his contract. Another star player, Josip Iličić, also left to join Fiorentina in July.

The club's pre-season camp was held at Sankt Lambrecht and Bad Kleinkirchheim, Austria from 12 July to 4 August.

On 6 August, the club formalized the appointment of former rosanero striker Igor Budan as team manager. The same day, Nicola Amoruso tended his resignation from his position as Palermo's director of football citing personal reasons.

Palermo made its season debut in the Coppa Italia with a 2–1 home win against Lega Pro Prima Divisione club Cremonese, but were eliminated in the following round by newly promoted top-flight club Hellas Verona, who won at Stadio Renzo Barbera thanks to a goal from former rosanero Luca Toni. Serie B debut match, away at Modena, ended in a 1–1 draw, and was followed by a shocking 1–2 home loss at the hands of Empoli, immediately raising doubts about the team's ability to adapt at new life in the second division. This was however immediately followed by the team's first win of the league, a 3–0 away success against Padova thanks to a brace from Abel Hernández. Two consecutive away defeats to Bari and Spezia however damaged Gattuso's position, and led to his ultimate sacking on 25 September and his immediate replacement with the more experienced Giuseppe Iachini. In his debut, Iachini easily defeated S.S. Juve Stabia by a clear 3–0 result. Under Iachini's tenure, results improved dramatically and Palermo ended the first half of the season topping the league. During the January 2014 window, the club was further strengthened by the signings of promising youngster Achraf Lazaar and veteran playmaker Enzo Maresca, as well as the addition of Franco Vázquez, who was previously left out of the squad under Gattuso. Also thanks to these additions, Palermo established as the main force in the league and spent the whole 2014 on top of the league, reaching up to a 13-point advantage to second-placed Latina in April.

On 3 May 2014, after a 1–0 win at Novara, Palermo were mathematically crowned Serie B champions in advance of five league weeks, a Serie B record, and promptly finalized their top flight return after only one season.

=== Confirmed summer transfer market bids ===
In

—	FW	NIR	Kyle Lafferty (from FC Sion)
—	MF	GNB	Carlos Embalo (from Chaves)
—	FW	ITA	Davide Di Gennaro (from Spezia)
—	MF	ITA	Gennaro Troianello (from Sassuolo)
—	DF	ITA	Eros Pisano (from Genoa, co-ownership resolution)
—	GK	ITA	Nicola Braccalenti (on loan from Foligno)
—	MF	SRB	Alen Stevanović (on loan from Torino)
—	DF	ITA	Claudio Terzi (from Siena)
—	MF	ITA	Houssem Ferchichi (on loan from Montebelluna)
—	DF	SUI	Fabio Daprelà (from Brescia)
—	MF	ITA	Francesco Bolzoni (from Siena)
—	MF	FRA	Granddi Ngoyi (from Troyes)
—	DF	SRB	Boris Grozdić (on loan from Hajduk Kula)
—	MF	ITA	Valerio Verre (on loan from Udinese)
—	FW	ITA	Andrea Belotti (on loan from Albinoleffe)
—	MF	POR	José Domingos Neves Lourenço (from Rio Ave)
—	MF	POR	João Manuel Pinto Do Amaral (from Benfica)

Out

—	MF	SVN	Jasmin Kurtić (to Sassuolo, co-ownership)
—	DF	SUI	Steve von Bergen (to BSC Young Boys)
—	MF	ITA	Massimo Donati (to Verona)
—	GK	ITA	Giacomo Brichetto (end of contract)
—	FW	ITA	Fabrizio Miccoli (end of contract, to Lecce)
—	FW	CRO	Igor Budan (retired)
—	DF	ROU	Cristian Melinte (end of contract, to Concordia Chiajna)
—	FW	ITA	Giuseppe Prestia (end of contract, to Parma)
—	FW	PAR	Cesar Verdun Servín (to Verona)
—	MF	PAR	Oscar Arzamendia (to Verona)
—	FW	ITA	Dario Maltese (on loan to Latina, co-ownership)
—	GK	ITA	Alessandro Micai (on loan to Südtirol, co-ownership)
—	MF	ITA	Giulio Migliaccio (to Atalanta)
—	MF	SVN	Josip Iličić (to Fiorentina)
—	FW	PAR	Daniel Jara Martínez (to Genoa)
—	MF	BRA	Anselmo (released, to São Caetano)
—	MF	ITA	Francesco Benussi (released, to Udinese)
—	MF	ITA	Nicolas Viola (to Ternana, co-ownership)
—	MF	ITA	Francesco Mirko Velardi (released, to Parma)
—	FW	ARG	Mauricio Sperduti (released, to Arsenal de Sarandí)

Out on loan

—	FW	ITA	Gianluca Di Chiara (to Latina)
—	FW	ITA	Gabriele Zerbo (to Pergolettese)
—	MF	ITA	Stefano Cerniglia (to Pergolettese)
—	DF	SRB	Jevrem Kosnić (to Pisa)
—	FW	ITA	Mauro Bollino (to Pisa)
—	MF	ITA	Francesco Vassallo (to Südtirol)
—	DF	ITA	Daniel Cappelletti (to Südtirol)
—	FW	ITA	Umberto Nappello (to Forlì)
—	MF	ITA	Vito Migliore (to Torino)
—	DF	POR	Nélson (to Almería)
—	FW	SWE	Agon Mehmeti (to Olhanense)
—	DF	ITA	Edoardo Goldaniga (to Pisa)
—	MF	PAR	Roger Miller Rojas (to Chiasso)
—	DF	ARG	Santiago García (to Werder Bremen)
—	GK	ITA	Emiliano Viviano (to Arsenal)
—	DF	ITA	Andrea Mantovani (to Bologna)

=== Confirmed winter transfer market bids ===
In

—	DF	ITA	Roberto Vitiello (unattached)
—	DF	ITA	Achraf Lazaar (from Varese)
—	MF	ITA	Enzo Maresca (from Sampdoria)
—	MF	ITA	Alberto Acquadro (on loan from Borgosesia)
—	MF	ITA	Gianluca Di Chiara (loan return from Latina)
—	FW	ITA	Eric Lanini (from Juventus, co-ownership)

Out

—	DF	ITA	Edoardo Goldaniga (to Juventus, co-ownership; remains on loan at Pisa)

Out on loan

—	DF	URU	Ignacio Lores (to Bari)
—	MF	ITA	Gianluca Di Chiara (to Catanzaro)
—	FW	ITA	Eric Lanini (to Prato)
—	MF	ITA	Giulio Sanseverino (to Perugia)

== Staff ==
=== Managerial staff ===
Position	Staff
Chairman	(Italy) Maurizio Zamparini
Vice-Chairman	(Italy) Guglielmo Miccichè
General Manager Sport	(Italy) Giorgio Perinetti
Team Manager	(Croatia) Igor Budan

Last updated: 9 July 2013
Source: U.S Città di Palermo official website

=== Coaching staff ===
Position	Staff
Head Coach	(Italy) Giuseppe Iachini
Assistant Coach	(Italy) Giuseppe Carillo
Fitness Coach	(Italy) Andrea Corrain
Fitness Coach	(Italy) Marcello Iaia
Fitness Coach	(Italy) Fabrizio Tafani
Injured Players Recovery	(Italy) Alberto Andorlini
Goalkeeping Coach	(Italy) Franco Paleari

Last updated: 25 September 2013
Source: U.S Città di Palermo official website

== Squad information ==
Full season statistics

No.	Pos	Nat	Player	Total		Serie B		Coppa Italia	
No.	Pos	Nat	Player	Apps	Goals	Apps	Goals	Apps	Goals
1	GK	(Italy) ITA	Stefano Sorrentino	34	-22	32	-20	2	-2
12	GK	(Italy) ITA	Andrea Fulignati	0	0	0	0	0	0
26	GK	(Kosovo) KOS	Samir Ujkani	11	-8	11	-8	0	0
2	DF	(Slovenia) SVN	Aljaž Struna	1	0	1	0	0	0
3	DF	(Italy) ITA	Eros Pisano	36	3	34	2	2	1
4	DF	(Slovenia) SVN	Siniša Anđelković	38	1	36	1	2	0
5	DF	(Serbia) SRB	Milan Milanović	18	1	18	1	0	0
6	DF	(Argentina) ARG	Ezequiel Muñoz	33	3	33	3	0	0
7	DF	(Morocco) MAR	Achraf Lazaar	14	0	14	0	0	0
17	DF	(Switzerland) SUI	Michel Morganella	16	1	16	1	0	0
19	DF	(Italy) ITA	Claudio Terzi	33	0	31	0	2	0
28	DF	(Switzerland) SUI	Fabio Daprelà	27	0	25	0	2	0
29	DF	(Italy) ITA	Roberto Vitiello	9	0	9	0	0	0
8	MF	(Paraguay) PAR	Édgar Barreto (captain)	34	4	34	4	0	0
10	MF	(Italy) ITA	Davide Di Gennaro	15	2	14	2	1	0
14	MF	(Serbia) SRB	Alen Stevanović	22	0	21	0	1	0
15	MF	(Italy) ITA	Francesco Bolzoni	39	4	37	4	2	0
19	MF	(Italy) ITA	Gennaro Troianello	16	0	15	0	1	0
20	MF	(Argentina) ARG	Franco Vázquez	19	4	18	4	1	0
21	MF	(Slovenia) SVN	Armin Bačinović	9	0	8	0	1	0
23	MF	(Italy) ITA	Valerio Verre	20	0	20	0	0	0
25	MF	(Italy) ITA	Enzo Maresca	13	0	13	0	0	0
27	MF	(France) FRA	Granddi Ngoyi	22	0	20	0	2	0
9	FW	(Argentina) ARG	Paulo Dybala	30	5	28	5	2	0
11	FW	(Uruguay) URU	Abel Hernández	30	14	28	14	2	0
18	FW	(Northern Ireland) NIR	Kyle Lafferty	36	12	34	11	2	1
24	FW	(Switzerland) SUI	Cephas Malele	3	0	3	0	0	0
30	FW	(Italy) ITA	Andrea Belotti	24	10	24	10	0	0
Players sold or loaned out during the winter transfer market:
7	MF	(Italy) ITA	Giulio Sanseverino	2	0	1	0	1	0
16	MF	(Uruguay) URU	Ignacio Lores	6	0	4	0	2	0
