= 2012–13 US Città di Palermo season =

U.S. Città di Palermo
2012–13 season
- Chairman: Maurizio Zamparini
- Head coach: Giuseppe Sannino (until 16 September 2012); Gian Piero Gasperini (from 16 September 2012 until 4 February 2013); Alberto Malesani (from 5 February 2013 until 24 February 2013); Gian Piero Gasperini (from 24 February 2013 until 11 March 2013); Giuseppe Sannino (from 12 March 2013)
- Stadium: Stadio Renzo Barbera
- Serie A: 18th
- Coppa Italia: Fourth round
- Top goalscorer: League: Josip Iličić (10); All: Josip Iličić (11)
- Highest home attendance: 26,597 (vs Internazionale)
Home colours	Away colours	Third colours

U.S. Città di Palermo played the 2012–13 season in Serie A, the ninth consecutive season for the Sicilian club in the Italian top flight since their return to the league in 2004.

== Review and events ==
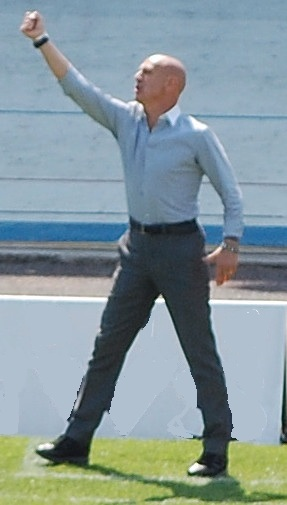
Giuseppe Sannino served as Palermo boss during pre-season, and for the first three games of the season.

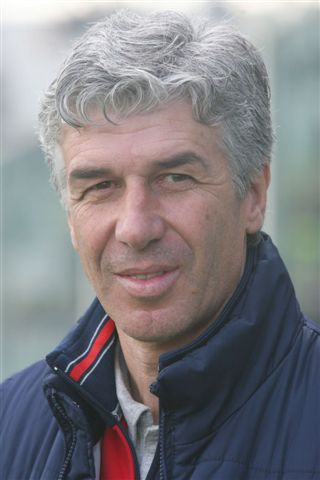
Gian Piero Gasperini, appointed to replace Sannino on 16 September 2012.

After a disappointing end to its 2011–12 campaign (16th place, the worst in the club history since its 2004 Serie A return) Palermo parted ways with end-of-season boss Bortolo Mutti. In an attempt to provide a better structure for the club, Siena director of football Giorgio Perinetti was appointed as vice-president in charge of transfer matters, with Luca Cattani moved back to his previous role as scouting chief and Argentine manager Patricio Teubal (formerly a Mediaset employee) as marketing chief. Following Perinetti's appointment, many media sources strongly linked Siena head coach Giuseppe Sannino to the Palermo managerial vacancy. Sannino was officially announced as new head coach of Palermo on 6 June 2012. In addition, PUMA will replace Legea as main technical sponsor.

Regarding the club's summer market moves, the first signing already came in January as promising midfielder Nicolas Viola had immediately agreed a contract with the Rosanero but stayed on loan at Reggina for the remainder of the season. Later in April, chairman/owner Maurizio Zamparini announced to have acquired promising Argentine youngster Paulo Dybala, labelling him the "new Agüero." The move was however denied by Dybala's football agent, who declared that Palermo had not found a contract agreement with the player yet, despite having bought the player's transfer rights as confirmed by the Instituto board. Later in May, Zamparini announced also the signing of 18-year-old Uruguayan forward Sebastián Sosa from Cerro Largo FC. On 21 May 2012, FC Koper announced to have permanently sold midfielder Aljaž Struna to Palermo, thus becoming the fifth Slovene to move to Sicily in the last two years. On 6 June 2012, together with the announcement of new head coach Sannino, Palermo confirmed to have signed 33-year-old attacking midfielder/deep-lying forward Franco Brienza, formerly a Rosanero from 2000 to 2007, from Siena.

On 26 June 2012, Palermo announced the departure of youth coach and former playing hero Giovanni Tedesco, who left the club to pursue a head coaching career in the lower ranks of Italian football. The same day, the club also announced to have hired former Juventus and Napoli player Dario Baccin as new technical area coordinator for the club's youth system.

On 6 July 2012, Palermo confirmed to have reached an agreement for the transfer of Argentine defender Matías Silvestre on loan to Internazionale, with an option for the club to make the acquisition permanent by the end of the season. The first team roster started its preparation at the orders of coach Giuseppe Sannino on 12 July 2012 in Varese, and will move at the Venosta training camp four days later. Later the same day, striker Igor Budan was allowed to leave as his two-year-old daughter suddenly died in Croatia.

On 13 July 2012, Palermo supporters were awarded the Lega Serie A Fair-Play Trophy "Gaetano Scirea" for their sportsmanship behaviour in the last championship.

On 20 July 2012, incidentally also the tenth anniversary of Zamparini's reign as Palermo chairman, the club announced to have completed the signing of Argentine youngster Paulo Dybala.

On 23 July 2012, Palermo formalized the signing of Uruguayan international Egidio Arévalo Ríos from Club Tijuana in a three-year permanent deal.

In the first days of August, the club sold a number of first team players: on 1 August, Emiliano Viviano and Francesco Della Rocca were loaned to Fiorentina, whereas vice-captain and Italy international full-back Federico Balzaretti left Sicily after five years to sign a three-year contract with Roma. The following day, the club completed the transfer of Edgar Álvarez to Romanian side Dinamo București.

Later on 20 August, Palermo formalized and announced a deal that brought Swiss international Steve von Bergen in Sicily, in exchange for Alexandros Tzorvas (permanent) and youth team forward Daniel Jara Martínez (on loan). Palermo made a disappointing debut in the Serie A season, losing 0–3 to Napoli at home.

In the final day of the transfer window, Palermo also sold vice-captain and long-time rosanero Giulio Migliaccio to Fiorentina.

Palermo experienced a dismal start, with two 0–3 losses in a row (at home to Napoli, then away at Lazio) followed by a 1–1 home draw against Cagliari. These results led chairman Maurizio Zamparini to state he was "afraid of relegation", and persuaded him to remove Sannino from his coaching duties on 16 September 2012, and replace him with former Genoa and Inter boss Gian Piero Gasperini. Gasperini started his stint as Palermo coach with two consecutive defeats to Atalanta and Pescara; following that, chairman Zamparini shuffled the cards once again, announcing former Catania director of football Pietro Lo Monaco as new managing director and minority stakeholder, thus effectively replacing summer appointment Giorgio Perinetti and reducing his own role at Palermo; as a consequence, Perinetti tended his resignation days after these events. In the following game, Palermo trashed Chievo 4–1 at home thanks to a hat-trick from captain Fabrizio Miccoli (including a nationally praised volley goal from 45 metres), finally winning its first three points of the season. In the same game, Miccoli also marked the goal number 1,000 in the story of the club in the Italian top flight. Despite Gasperini's appointment, Palermo kept struggling in the league and found itself involved in the relegation battle. Palermo's second win under Gasperini came in a 2–0 home win against Sampdoria thanks to a brace from 18-year-old Paulo Dybala, who effectively replaced injured Miccoli by scoring his first goals in the Italian championship. The following home game saw Palermo trashing Catania 3–1 in the Sicilian derby, with a goal from Miccoli (the 100th of his Serie A career) followed by two from Iličić. However, this was followed by a string of four winless games in a row (one draw and three losses), the last of them being a 0–3 home loss at the hands of Fiorentina that left the Rosanero in 18th place by the end of the calendar year, thus in deep relegation zone.

As previously suggested by both chairman Zamparini and general manager Lo Monaco, who publicly announced their intention to sign at least one striker, a left back/left winger and a defender, Palermo decided to actively change the roster in the winter transfer window. The first signing, already announced in December, regarded Palermo-born experienced defender Salvatore Aronica, who joined from Napoli, in the same days the club completed the permanent sale of Nicolás Bertolo to Mexican club Cruz Azul. Another signing, Brazilian midfielder Anselmo, came then into effect as a co-ownership bid, in exchange for Eros Pisano, who moved to the other direction in another co-ownership deal. Days later, Palermo also announced the loan signing of Andrea Dossena from Napoli in an attempt to replace a vacancy created already in the summer by the departure of Federico Balzaretti to Roma. One more loan move was announced on 23 January, this being the signing of attacking midfielder Mauro Formica from English side Blackburn Rovers. This was preceded by a number of departures: Carlos Labrín left to move back to Huachipato and Eran Zahavi returned to his previous Israeli club, Maccabi Tel Aviv.

Other departures involved respected veteran striker Igor Budan, who moved to Atalanta on loan until the end of the season, and Luigi Giorgi, who also moved to Atalanta after Palermo opted to terminate the loan deal with Novara. Palermo also entered a long, well-publicized negotiation with Chievo regarding the services of 34-year-old goalkeeper Stefano Sorrentino to replace Ujkani, who was deemed as inexperienced by the club; after overcoming a number of obstacles, Palermo succeeded in completing the deal on 25 January, thus opening the doors for Ujkani's departure. Sorrentino promptly provided a man-of-the-match debut in a 1–1 draw at Cagliari, with Palermo suffering an injury-time equalizer to prevent the Rosanero from winning their first away game of the season.

The next day, on 28 January, Lo Monaco completed two more moves for Palermo, signing centre forward Mauro Boselli (on loan from Wigan Athletic) and right back/right winger Nélson from Real Betis. However, following disagreements with Zamparini, Lo Monaco resigned later in February and Perinetti was hired back to his previous role as director of football. Results did not improve, leaving Palermo in deep relegation zone and leading to a mutual consent contract termination between Gasperini and the club on 11 March, following a 1–2 home loss to Siena; one day later, Sannino was re-hired to attempt a desperate escape from relegation. Despite a number of positive results, including wins to Roma and Internazionale, Sannino did not however manage to bring the team out of the relegation zone and Palermo were relegated by the end of the season, thus marking an end to a nine-year stay to the top flight.

=== Confirmed summer transfer market bids ===
In

—	MF	ITA	Franco Brienza (from Siena)
—	DF	ITA	Matteo Darmian (co-ownership resolution from Milan, loan return from Torino)
—	DF	ITA	Gianluca Di Chiara (co-ownership resolution from Reggiana)
—	MF	SVN	Jasmin Kurtić (loan return from Varese)
—	DF	SUI	Michel Morganella (co-ownership resolution from Novara)
—	FW	URU	Sebastián Sosa (from Cerro Largo)
—	MF	SVN	Aljaž Struna (from Koper)
—	GK	ALB	Samir Ujkani (co-ownership resolution from Novara)
—	MF	ITA	Nicolas Viola (from Reggina, loan return)
—	GK	ITA	Andrea Fulignati (on loan from Sestese)
—	DF	ITA	Edoardo Goldaniga (from Pergolettese)
—	FW	ARG	Paulo Dybala (from Instituto de Córdoba)
—	MF	URU	Egidio Arévalo Ríos (from Club Tijuana)
—	GK	ITA	Emiliano Viviano (co-ownership resolution from Internazionale)
—	DF	SUI	Steve von Bergen (from Genoa)
—	MF	ITA	Luigi Giorgi (on loan from Novara)
—	FW	ITA	Christian Damiano (on loan from Gubbio)

Out

—	DF	ITA	Francesco Ardizzone (co-ownership resolution in favour of Reggiana)
—	FW	ITA	Marco Giovio (co-ownership resolution in favour of Grosseto)
—	FW	ARG	Pablo Andrés González (to Novara)
—	FW	ITA	Davide Lanzafame (co-ownership resolution in favour of Catania)
—	DF	ITA	Antonio Mazzotta (co-ownership resolution in favour of Lecce)
—	DF	ITA	Mattia Migani (co-ownership resolution in favour of San Marino)
—	MF	ITA	Gianvito Misuraca (co-ownership resolution in favour of Vicenza)
—	DF	ITA	Andrea Adamo (to Foligno)
—	DF	ITA	Mattia Cassani (to Fiorentina)
—	FW	CHI	Mauricio Pinilla (to Cagliari)
—	DF	ITA	Eros Pellegrini (to Esperia Viareggio, co-ownership)
—	DF	ITA	Matteo Darmian (to Torino, co-ownership)
—	FW	ITA	Davide Succi (to Cesena)
—	FW	ITA	Gabriele Zerbo (to Teramo, co-ownership; signed back, to Chievo, co-ownership)
—	MF	BRA	João Pedro (loan return from Peñarol, to Santos)
—	MF	ITA	Francesco Mirko Velardi (loan return from Foggia, to Como)
—	DF	ITA	Federico Balzaretti (to Roma)
—	MF	HON	Edgar Álvarez (to Dinamo București)
—	GK	GRE	Alexandros Tzorvas (to Genoa)
—	FW	ITA	Luca Di Matteo (to Vicenza)
—	MF	ITA	Giovanni Cristofari (released)

Out on loan

—	DF	ITA	Giuseppe Prestia (to Ascoli)
—	DF	ITA	Gianluca Di Chiara (to Pavia)
—	GK	ITA	Alessandro Micai (to Como)
—	MF	SVN	Aljaž Struna (to Varese)
—	DF	ARG	Matías Silvestre (to Internazionale)
—	MF	PAR	Oscar Arzamendia (to Verona)
—	FW	PAR	César Verdún (to Verona)
—	MF	SVN	Armin Bačinović (to Verona)
—	DF	ITA	Daniel Cappelletti (to Südtirol)
—	MF	GHA	Afriyie Acquah (to Parma)
—	DF	SVN	Siniša Anđelković (to Modena)
—	DF	ROU	Cristian Melinte (loan return from Petrolul Ploiești, to Astra Ploiești)
—	GK	ITA	Emiliano Viviano (to Fiorentina)
—	MF	ITA	Francesco Della Rocca (to Fiorentina)
—	FW	PAR	Daniel Jara Martínez (to Genoa)
—	MF	ARG	Franco Vázquez (to Rayo Vallecano)
—	FW	SWE	Agon Mehmeti (to Novara)
—	MF	HUN	Ádám Simon (to Szombathelyi Haladás)
—	MF	URU	Ignacio Lores (to Botev Vratsa)
—	MF	ITA	Giulio Migliaccio (to Fiorentina)
—	MF	ITA	Francesco Vassallo (to Foligno)
—	FW	ITA	Umberto Nappello (to Gubbio)
—	FW	ITA	Michele Pieri (to Santarcangelo)

=== Confirmed winter transfer market bids ===
In

—	DF	ITA	Salvatore Aronica (from Napoli)
—	MF	BRA	Anselmo (from Genoa, co-ownership)
—	DF	ITA	Andrea Dossena (on loan from Napoli)
—	FW	ITA	Gabriele Zerbo (signed back from Chievo, co-ownership resolution)
—	MF	ARG	Mauro Formica (on loan from Blackburn Rovers)
—	GK	ITA	Stefano Sorrentino (from Chievo)
—	FW	ARG	Mauro Boselli (on loan from Wigan Athletic)
—	DF	POR	Nélson (from Real Betis)
—	FW	ARG	Mauricio Sperduti (from Newell's Old Boys)
—	MF	ARG	Alejandro Faurlín (on loan from Queens Park Rangers)
—	FW	ITA	Diego Fabbrini (on loan from Udinese)

Out

—	MF	ARG	Nicolás Bertolo (to Cruz Azul)
—	DF	ITA	Eros Pisano (to Genoa, co-ownership)
—	MF	ITA	Luigi Giorgi (to Novara, loan terminated)
—	MF	ISR	Eran Zahavi (to Maccabi Tel Aviv)
—	MF	GHA	Afriyie Acquah (to 1899 Hoffenheim)
—	DF	ARG	Mauro Cetto (to San Lorenzo)
—	MF	ITA	Franco Brienza (to Atalanta)

Out on loan

—	DF	SRB	Milan Milanović (to Vicenza)
—	FW	CRO	Igor Budan (to Atalanta)
—	DF	CHI	Carlos Labrín (to Huachipato)
—	GK	ALB	Samir Ujkani (to Chievo)
—	FW	URU	Sebastián Sosa (to Central Español)
—	MF	URU	Ignacio Lores (to CSKA Sofia)

== Current squad ==
No.	Name	Nationality	Position	Date of birth (age)	Signed from	Notes
Goalkeepers
30	Giacomo Brichetto	(Italy)	GK	9 May 1983 (age 43)	Confirmed	
54	Stefano Sorrentino	(Italy)	GK	28 March 1979 (age 47)	(Italy) Chievo	
99	Francesco Benussi	(Italy)	GK	15 October 1981 (age 44)	(Italy) Torino	Loan return
Defenders
2	Andrea Mantovani	(Italy)	CB	22 June 1984 (age 42)	Confirmed	
3	Salvatore Aronica	(Italy)	LB	20 January 1978 (age 48)	(Italy) Napoli	
6	Ezequiel Muñoz	(Argentina)	CB	8 October 1990 (age 35)	Confirmed	
8	Andrea Dossena	(Italy)	LW	11 September 1981 (age 44)	(Italy) Napoli	On loan
22	Nélson	(Portugal)	RB	10 June 1983 (age 43)	(Spain) Real Betis	
25	Steve von Bergen	(Switzerland)	CB	10 June 1983 (age 43)	(Italy) Genoa	
29	Santiago García	(Argentina)	LB	8 July 1988 (age 38)	(Italy) Novara	loan return
89	Michel Morganella	(Switzerland)	RB	17 May 1989 (age 37)	(Italy) Novara	
Midfielders
5	Édgar Barreto	(Paraguay)	CM	15 July 1984 (age 42)	Confirmed	
7	Nicolas Viola	(Italy)	CM	12 October 1989 (age 36)	(Italy) Reggina	
14	Anselmo	(Brazil)	DM	20 February 1989 (age 37)	(Italy) Genoa	
18	Alejandro Faurlín	(Argentina)	CM	9 August 1986 (age 40)	(England) Queens Park Rangers	On loan
20	Egidio Arévalo Ríos	(Uruguay)	DM	1 January 1982 (age 44)	(Mexico) Club Tijuana	
23	Massimo Donati	(Italy)	CM	26 March 1981 (age 45)	Confirmed	
27	Josip Iličić	(Slovenia)	AM	29 January 1988 (age 38)	Confirmed	
28	Jasmin Kurtić	(Slovenia)	CM	10 January 1989 (age 37)	(Italy) Varese	Loan return
33	Mauro Formica	(Argentina)	AM	4 April 1988 (age 38)	(England) Blackburn Rovers	On loan
50	Giulio Sanseverino	(Italy)	MF	10 February 1994 (age 32)	Youth team	
Forwards
9	Paulo Dybala	(Argentina)	ST	15 November 1993 (age 32)	(Argentina) Instituto de Córdoba	
10	Fabrizio Miccoli	(Italy)	ST	27 June 1979 (age 47)	Confirmed	captain
11	Abel Hernández	(Uruguay)	ST	8 August 1990 (age 36)	Confirmed	
16	Diego Fabbrini	(Italy)	ST	31 July 1990 (age 36)	(Italy) Udinese	On loan
17	Mauro Boselli	(Argentina)	ST	22 May 1985 (age 41)	(England) Wigan Athletic	On loan
19	Mauricio Sperduti	(Argentina)	ST	16 February 1986 (age 40)	(Argentina) Newell's Old Boys	
24	Cephas Malele	(Switzerland)	ST	8 January 1994 (age 32)	Youth team	

=== Staff ===
Position	Staff
Chairman	(Italy) Maurizio Zamparini
Vice-Chairman	(Italy) Guglielmo Miccichè
Managing Director	(Italy) Pietro Lo Monaco
General Manager Sport	(Italy) Giorgio Perinetti
General Manager Corporate	(Argentina) Patricio Teubal
Sport Manager	(Italy) Luca Cattani
General Services Director	(Italy) Giuseppe Del Bianco

Last updated: 20 September 2012
Source: U.S Città di Palermo official website

=== Primavera ===
Position	Staff
Youth Sport Manager	(Italy) Rosario Argento
Under-19 coach	(Italy) Pietro Ruisi
Under-19 goalkeeping coach	(Italy) Vincenzo Sicignano

Last updated: July 2012
Source: U.S Città di Palermo official website

== Match results ==
=== Legend ===
Win	Draw	Loss

=== Pre-season friendlies ===
Win Draw Loss

19 July 2012 Friendly	Palermo (Italy)	14–0	(Italy) Alta Val Venosta selection	Vinschgau
17:00 CEST	2', 25', 31', 38' Miccoli; 24', 31' Zahavi; 5', 22' Brienza; 7', 35' Iličić; 28' Bertolo; 16', 28' Viola; 26' Mehmeti	Report		Stadium: Mals
Note: Match of 90' minutes

22 July 2012 Friendly	Palermo (Italy)	6–0	(Italy) Vel Venosta selection	Vinschgau
17:00 CEST	5', 14' Miccoli; 10', 41' Vázquez; 59' Bertolo; 83' Dybala	Report		Stadium: Mals; Referee: Alex Cavallina

25 July 2012 Forst Cup	Palermo (Italy)	2–1	(Italy) Maia Alta	Merano
18:00 CEST	26' Vázquez; 40' Migliaccio	Report	26' Bernard	Stadium: Merano; Attendance: >3,500

25 July 2012 Forst Cup	Palermo (Italy)	2–0	(Italy) F.C. Südtirol	Merano
19:00 CEST	14' Brienza; 15' Dybala	Report		Stadium: Merano; Attendance: >3,500

29 July 2012 Sportwell Cup	Palermo (Italy)	5–4	(Italy) Como	Vinschgau
17:00 CEST		Report		Stadium: Mals; Attendance: >3,000
Note: Match of 45' minutes, over 5-4 Pen.

29 July 2012 Sportwell Cup	Palermo (Italy)	1–0	(Greece) Aris	Vinschgau
17:00 CEST	9' (pen.) Miccoli	Report		Stadium: Mals; Attendance: >3,000
Note: Match of 45' minutes, Palermo 6 pts, Aris 3 pts, Como 2 pts

1 August 2012 Friendly	Palermo (Italy)	18–0	(Europe) Selection Amateur	Vinschgau
17:00 CEST		Report		Stadium: Mals; Attendance: >1,000

4 August 2012 Friendly	Palermo (Italy)	1–0	(Italy) Hellas Verona	Trento
17:00 CEST	45' Miccoli	Report		Stadium: Stadio Briamasco; Attendance: 4,000

12 August 2012 Master Group Cup	Palermo (Italy)	4–1	(Italy) Parma	Palermo
19:45 CEST	38' Barreto; 45+1' Iličić; 50' Pisano; 84' Budan	Report	39' Lucarelli	Stadium: Stadio Renzo Barbera; Attendance: 5,864; Referee: Gianpaolo Calvarese

=== Serie A ===
The fixtures for the 2012–13 Serie A were announced on 26 July 2012. The season starts on Sunday 26 August 2012 with Palermo taking on Napoli at the Renzo Barbera, and ends Sunday 19 May 2013 with a match against Parma.

==== Matches ====
Kickoff times are in CET.

26 August 2012 1	Palermo	0–3	Napoli	Palermo
20:45	Von Bergen (yellow card) 44'; Bertolo (yellow card) 48'; Barreto (yellow card) 62'	Report	Hamšík 45+2'; Aronica (yellow card) 63'; Maggio 79'; Britos (yellow card) 81'; Cavani 88'; De Sanctis (yellow card) 90+2'	Stadium: Stadio Renzo Barbera; Attendance: 20,000; Referee: Daniele Orsato

1 September 2012 2	Lazio	3–0	Palermo	Rome
20:45	Klose 39', 82', (yellow card) 64'; Candreva 56'; Candreva (yellow card) 56'; Lulić (yellow card) 59'	Report	Miccoli (yellow card) 58'; Arévalo Ríos (yellow card) 68'	Stadium: Stadio Olimpico; Attendance: 31,000; Referee: Domenico Celi

15 September 2012 3	Palermo	1–1	Cagliari	Palermo
18:00	Mantovani (yellow card) 23'; Miccoli (yellow card) 36'; Arévalo Ríos 41'; García (yellow card) 45+1'	Report	Nainggolan (yellow card) 20'; Sau 88'; Pinilla (yellow card) 90+3'	Stadium: Stadio Renzo Barbera; Referee: Paolo Mazzoleni

23 September 2012 4	Atalanta	1–0	Palermo	Bergamo
15:00	Manfredini (yellow card) 40'; Lucchini (yellow card) 45'; Raimondi 88'; Cigarini (yellow card) 90+2'; Troisi (yellow card) 90+4'	Report	Iličić (yellow card) 22'; Giorgi (yellow card) 65'; Donati (yellow card) 73'	Stadium: Stadio Atleti Azzurri d'Italia; Attendance: 13,467; Referee: Piero Giacomelli

26 September 2012 5	Pescara	1–0	Palermo	Pescara
20:45	Caprari (yellow card) 53'; Colucci (yellow card) 83'; Weiss 86', (yellow card) 87'; Zanon (yellow card) 90+4'		Von Bergen (red card) 36'; Donati (yellow card) 63'; Morganella (yellow card) 66'	Stadium: Stadio Adriatico; Attendance: 11,411; Referee: Daniele Doveri

30 September 2012 6	Palermo	4–1	Chievo	Palermo
15:00	Miccoli 13', 59', 82', (yellow card) 60'; Brienza (yellow card) 14' (yellow-red card) 62'; Giorgi 80'	Report	Dainelli (yellow card) 12'; Rigoni (yellow card) 15', (goal) 34'; Moscardelli (yellow card) 67'; Papp (yellow card) 68'	Stadium: Stadio Renzo Barbera; Attendance: 12,411; Referee: Mauro Bergonzi

7 October 2012 7	Genoa	1–1	Palermo	Genoa
15:00	Bovo (yellow card) 44'; Borriello 52'; Janković (yellow card) 80'; Jorquera (yellow card) 90+1'	Report	Giorgi 15'; Von Bergen (yellow card) 54'; Morganella (yellow card) 75'	Stadium: Stadio Luigi Ferraris; Attendance: 16,000; Referee: Dino Tommasi

21 October 2012 8	Palermo	0–0	Torino	Palermo
15:00	Iličić (yellow card) 78'	Report	Vives (yellow card) 10'; Di Cesare (yellow card) 27'; Cerci (yellow card) 34'; Gazzi (yellow card) 59'	Stadium: Stadio Renzo Barbera; Attendance: 18,000; Referee: Andrea Romeo

28 October 2012 9	Siena	0–0	Palermo	Siena
15:00	Vergassola (yellow card) 72'; Rubin (yellow card) 76'; Paci (yellow card) 85'	Report	Mantovani (yellow card) 70'; Bertolo (yellow card) 86'	Stadium: Stadio Artemio Franchi – Montepaschi Arena; Attendance: 8708; Referee: Giampaolo Calvarese

31 October 2012 10	Palermo	2–2	Milan	Palermo
15:00	Miccoli 45+1' (pen.); Brienza 47'; García (yellow card) 57'; Cetto (yellow card) 74'	Report	Bonera (yellow card) 2'; Constant (yellow card) 23'; Flamini (yellow card) 32'; Montolivo 69'; El Shaarawy 80'; Mexès (yellow card) 86'	Stadium: Stadio Renzo Barbera; Attendance: 18,000; Referee: Nicola Rizzoli

4 November 2012 11	Roma	4–1	Palermo	Rome
15:00	Totti 11'; Osvaldo 31'; Lamela 69'; Destro (yellow card) 77' (yellow-red card) 80', (goal) 79'; Burdisso (yellow card) 85'	Report	Pisano (yellow card) 5'; Iličić 82'; Muñoz (yellow card) 88'	Stadium: Stadio Olimpico; Attendance: 30,598; Referee: Andrea De Marco

11 November 2012 12	Palermo	2–0	Sampdoria	Palermo
15:00	Dybala 52', 71'; Muñoz (yellow card) 64'	Report	Gastaldello (yellow card) 7'; Éder (yellow card) 30'	Stadium: Stadio Renzo Barbera; Attendance: 13,423; Referee: Antonio Giannoccaro

18 November 2012 13	Bologna	3–0	Palermo	Bologna
15:00	Pérez (yellow card) 13'; Garics (yellow card) 15'; Gilardino 22'; Gabbiadini (yellow card) 42', (goal) 44' (pen.); Taïder (yellow card) 45+2' (yellow-red card) 78'; Diamanti 48' (pen.)	Report	Barreto (yellow card) 17' (yellow-red card) 72'; Donati (yellow card) 44'; Ujkani (red card) 46'; Labrín (red card) 82'	Stadium: Dall'Ara; Attendance: 20,148; Referee: Paolo Valeri

25 November 2012 14	Palermo	3–1	Catania	Palermo
15:00	Miccoli 10', (yellow card) 81'; Muñoz (yellow card) 40'; Donati (yellow card) 42'; Iličić 49', 60'	Report	Spolli (yellow card) 43'; Almirón (yellow card) 54'; Lodi 71'; Gómez (yellow card) 86'; Doukara (yellow card) 90+2'	Stadium: Stadio Renzo Barbera; Attendance: 20,969; Referee: Andrea Romeo

2 December 2012 15	Inter	1–0	Palermo	Milan
15:00	Pereira (yellow card) 40'; Samuel (yellow card) 71'; García 74' (o.g.)	Report	Barreto (yellow card) 19'; García (yellow card) 54'; Kurtić (yellow card) 63'	Stadium: Stadio San Siro; Attendance: 41,000; Referee: Mauro Bergonzi

9 December 2012 16	Palermo	0–1	Juventus	Palermo
15:00	Morganella (yellow card) 67' (yellow-red card) 75'	Report	Lichtsteiner (yellow card) 37', (goal) 50'; Pirlo (yellow card) 78'; Bonucci (yellow card) 87'	Stadium: Stadio Renzo Barbera; Attendance: 17000; Referee: Andrea De Marco

15 December 2012 17	Udinese	1–1	Palermo	Udine
18:00	Heurtaux (yellow card) 35' (yellow-red card) 61'; Basta (yellow card) 41'; Allan (yellow card) 76'; Di Natale (yellow card) 83', (goal) 89'		Iličić 33', (yellow card) 39'; Barreto (yellow card) 45'	Stadium: Stadio Friuli; Attendance: 12,000; Referee: Sebastiano Peruzzo

22 December 2012 18	Palermo	0–3	Fiorentina	Palermo
15:00	Muñoz (yellow card) 27'; Donati (yellow card) 82'; Pisano (yellow card) 85'	Report	Rodríguez (yellow card) 10', (goal) 89' (pen.); Migliaccio (yellow card) 32'; Jovetić 50', 83' (pen.); Cuadrado (yellow card) 54'; Neto (yellow card) 79'; Cassani (yellow card) 90+2'	Stadium: Stadio Renzo Barbera; Attendance: 17,000; Referee: Domenico Celi

6 January 2013 19	Parma	2–1	Palermo	Parma
15:00	Benalouane (yellow card) 31'; Parolo (yellow card) 52'; Lucarelli (yellow card) 57'; Belfodil 62'; Amauri 90+2'; Pavarini (yellow card) 90+4'	Report	Dybala (yellow card) 23'; Iličić (yellow card) 60'; Budan 85', (yellow card) 85'; Aronica (yellow card) 87'	Stadium: Stadio Ennio Tardini; Attendance: 14,000; Referee: Daniele Doveri

13 January 2013 20	Napoli	3–0	Palermo	Naples
15:00	Maggio 30'; Inler 34'; Insigne 73'	Report	Barreto (yellow card) 45'; Anselmo (yellow card) 54'	Stadium: Stadio San Paolo; Attendance: 36,000; Referee: Andrea Gervasoni

20 January 2013 21	Palermo	2–2	Lazio	Palermo
15:00	García (yellow card) 18'; Miccoli (yellow card) 45'; Arévalo Ríos 70'; Von Bergen (yellow card) 79'; Dybala 71'		Floccari 10'; Cavanda (yellow card) 43'; Lulić (yellow card) 58'; Hernanes 85' (pen.); Cana (yellow card) 90+1'	Stadium: Stadio Renzo Barbera; Attendance: 17,000; Referee: Gianluca Rocchi

27 January 2013 22	Cagliari	1–1	Palermo	Cagliari
15:00	Conti (yellow card) 23'; Pinilla (yellow card) 45'; Pisano (yellow card) 65'; Ribeiro 90'		Aronica (yellow card) 25'; Iličić 30'; Von Bergen (yellow card) 33'; Muñoz (yellow card) 52'; Dossena (yellow card) 63'; Miccoli (red card) 90+1'; Kurtić (yellow card) 90+5'	Stadium: Stadio Is Arenas; Attendance: 9,000; Referee: Paolo Valeri

3 February 2013 23	Palermo	1–2	Atalanta	Palermo
15:00	Formica (yellow card) 76'; Nélson 83'	Report	Scaloni (yellow card) 21'; Radovanović (yellow card) 35'; Carmona 54'; Cazzola (yellow card) 67'; Denis 72'	Stadium: Stadio Renzo Barbera; Attendance: 17,000; Referee: Antonio Damato

10 February 2013 24	Palermo	1–1	Pescara	Palermo
15:00	Fabbrini 80'; Barreto (yellow card) 87'	Report	Rizzo (yellow card) 11'; Blasi (yellow card) 18'; Bjarnason 73'	Stadium: Stadio Renzo Barbera; Attendance: 18,000; Referee: Massimiliano Irrati

17 February 2013 25	Chievo	1–1	Palermo	Verona
15:00	Hetemaj (yellow card) 35'; Andreolli (yellow card) 45'; Théréau 55'	Report	Formica 5'; García (yellow card) 54'; Muñoz (yellow card) 78'	Stadium: Stadio Marc'Antonio Bentegodi; Attendance: 10,000; Referee: Paolo Tagliavento

24 February 2013 26	Palermo	0–0	Genoa	Palermo
15:00	Aronica (yellow card) 42' (yellow-red card) 76'; Miccoli (yellow card) 57'; García (yellow card) 82'; Dossena (yellow card) 89'	Report	Portanova (yellow card) 25'; Matuzalém (yellow card) 26'; Moretti (yellow card) 45'; Kucka (yellow card) 69'; Granqvist (yellow card) 90+1'	Stadium: Stadio Renzo Barbera; Attendance: 18,995; Referee: Daniele Orsato

3 March 2013 27	Torino	0–0	Palermo	Turin
11:30	Vives (yellow card) 20'; Cerci (yellow card) 36'; Meggiorini (yellow card) 74'	Report	Kurtić (yellow card) 40'; Von Bergen (yellow card) 79'	Stadium: Stadio Olimpico di Torino; Attendance: 14,000; Referee: Gianluca Rocchi

10 March 2013 28	Palermo	1–2	Siena	Palermo
15:00	Von Bergen (yellow card) 16'; Anselmo 44'; Boselli (yellow card) 50'; Iličić (yellow card) 87'; García (yellow card) 90+2'	Report	Felipe (yellow card) 15'; Emeghara 51'; Calello (yellow card) 53'; Rosina 72' (pen.); Teixeira (yellow card) 77'	Stadium: Stadio Renzo Barbera; Attendance: 17,000; Referee: Andrea Romeo

17 March 2013 29	Milan	2–0	Palermo	Milan
15:00	Balotelli 8' (pen.), 66'; Zapata (yellow card) 32'	Report	Muñoz (yellow card) 71'	Stadium: San Siro; Attendance: 41,584; Referee: Sebastiano Peruzzo

30 March 2013 30	Palermo	2–0	Roma	Palermo
15:00	Muñoz (yellow card) 9'; Iličić 21', (yellow card) 51'; Miccoli 35'; Dybala (yellow card) 77'	Report	Piris (yellow card) 53'; Osvaldo (yellow card) 62'	Stadium: Stadio Renzo Barbera; Attendance: 17,000; Referee: Giampaolo Calvarese

7 April 2013 31	Sampdoria	1–3	Palermo	Genoa
15:00	Munari 43'; Palombo (yellow card) 80'; Mustafi (yellow card) 84'	Report	Von Bergen 35'; Barreto (yellow card) 45'; Iličić 50'; García 56'	Stadium: Stadio Luigi Ferraris; Attendance: 23,000; Referee: Marco Guida

14 April 2013 32	Palermo	1–1	Bologna	Palermo
15:00	Iličić 5', (yellow card) 30'; Morganella (yellow card) 26'; Donati (yellow card) 90+2'; Aronica (yellow card) 90+5'	Report	Gabbiadini 17'; Kone (yellow card) 29'; Garics (yellow card) 49'; Christodoulopoulos (yellow card) 62'; Guarente (yellow card) 90+5'	Stadium: Stadio Renzo Barbera; Attendance: 26,029; Referee: Daniele Doveri

21 April 2013 33	Catania	1–1	Palermo	Catania
15:00	Barrientos 69'; Spolli (yellow card) 75'; Bellusci (yellow card) 90+4'; Andújar (red card) 90+5'	Report	Donati (yellow card) 1'; Dossena (yellow card) 16'; Muñoz (yellow card) 56'; Iličić 90+5'	Stadium: Stadio Angelo Massimino; Referee: Paolo Mazzoleni

28 April 2013 34	Palermo	1–0	Inter	Palermo
15:00	Iličić 10'; Miccoli (yellow card) 11'; Morganella (yellow card) 57'; Barreto (yellow card) 58'; Hernández (yellow card) 89'	Report	Silvestre (yellow card) 45+1'; Juan (yellow card) 51'; Handanović (yellow card) 78'; Schelotto (yellow card) 86'	Stadium: Stadio Renzo Barbera; Referee: Daniele Orsato

5 May 2013 35	Juventus	1–0	Palermo	Turin
15:00	Barzagli (yellow card) 42'; Vidal 59' (pen.), (yellow card) 60'; Pogba (red card) 83'	Report	Donati (yellow card) 58'	Stadium: Juventus Stadium; Referee: Andrea Romeo

9 May 2013 36	Palermo	2–3	Udinese	Palermo
15:00	Barreto (yellow card) 30'; Miccoli 34' (pen.); Dossena (yellow card) 51'; Aronica (yellow card) 53'; Faurlín (yellow card) 60'; Morganella (yellow card) 75'; Hernández 81'	Report	Muriel 9'; Agyemang-Badu (yellow card) 46'; Angella 64'; Benatia 83'	Stadium: Stadio Renzo Barbera; Referee: Antonio Giannoccaro

12 May 2013 37	Fiorentina	1–0	Palermo	Florence
15:00	Savić (yellow card) 16'; Toni 41'	Report	Faurlín (yellow card) 27'; Kurtić (yellow card) 61'; García (yellow card) 66'; Viola (yellow card) 78'	Stadium: Stadio Artemio Franchi; Attendance: 28,023; Referee: Antonio Damato

19 May 2013 38	Palermo	1–3	Parma	Palermo
15:00	Miccoli 76'; Donati (yellow card) 78'		Gobbi 38'; Valdés 41'; Belfodil 45+1', (yellow card) 60'; Galloppa (yellow card) 79'	Stadium: Stadio Renzo Barbera; Attendance: 18,000; Referee: Diego Roca

=== Results by round ===
Round	1	2	3	4	5	6	7	8	9	10	11	12	13	14	15	16	17	18	19	20	21	22	23	24	25	26	27	28	29	30	31	32	33	34	35	36	37	38
Ground	H	A	H	A	A	H	A	H	A	H	A	H	A	H	A	A	H	A	H	A	H	A	H	H	A	H	A	H	A	H	A	H	A	H	H	A	H	A
Result	L	L	D	L	L	W	D	D	D	D	L	W	L	W																								
Position	17	17	18	19	20	17	19	19	17	17	19	14	16	15																								

Updated to match(es) played on 28 November. Source: AllTimeSoccer.com
A = Away; H = Home; W = Win; D = Draw; L = Loss

== Matches ==
Kickoff times are in CET.

18 August 2012 Third Round	Palermo	3–1	Cremonese	Palermo
20:45	22', 33' Miccoli; 73' Iličić	Report	24' Le Noci	Stadium: Stadio Renzo Barbera; Attendance: 12.091; Referee: Daniele Doveri

28 November 2012 Fourth Round	Palermo	1–2	Hellas Verona	Palermo
20:45	Giorgi 7'	Report	Cocco 9'; Cacia 73'	Stadium: Stadio Renzo Barbera; Attendance: 7,620; Referee: Sebastiano Peruzzo

== Squad statistics ==
=== Top scorers ===
This includes all competitive matches. The list is sorted by shirt number when total goals are equal.

R	No.	Pos	Nat	Name	Serie A	Coppa Italia	Total
1	27	MF	(Slovenia)	Josip Iličić	10	1	11
2	10	FW	(Italy)	Fabrizio Miccoli	8	2	10
3	9	FW	(Argentina)	Paulo Dybala	3	0	3
=	17	MF	(Italy)	Luigi Giorgi	2	1	3
5	20	MF	(Uruguay)	Egidio Arévalo Ríos	2	0	2
6	14	MF	(Brazil)	Anselmo	1	0	1
=	16	FW	(Italy)	Diego Fabbrini	1	0	1
=	19	FW	(Croatia)	Igor Budan	1	0	1
=	21	MF	(Italy)	Franco Brienza	1	0	1
=	22	DF	(Portugal)	Nélson	1	0	1
=	25	DF	(Switzerland)	Steve von Bergen	1	0	1
=	29	DF	(Argentina)	Santiago García	1	0	1
=	33	FW	(Argentina)	Mauro Formica	1	0	1

Last updated: 28 October 2012
Source: Competitions

=== Squad information ===
Updated as of 30 June 2013

No.	Pos	Nat	Player	Total		Serie A		Coppa Italia	
No.	Pos	Nat	Player	Apps	Goals	Apps	Goals	Apps	Goals
Goalkeepers
22	GK	(Italy) ITA	Giacomo Brichetto	0	0	0	0	0	0
54	GK	(Italy) ITA	Stefano Sorrentino	15	0	15	0	0	0
99	GK	(Italy) ITA	Francesco Benussi	6	0	4+1	0	1	0
Defenders
2	DF	(Italy) ITA	Andrea Mantovani	6	0	4+2	0	0	0
3	DF	(Italy) ITA	Salvatore Aronica	16	0	16	0	0	0
4	DF	(Portugal) POR	Nélson	8	1	3+5	1	0	0
6	DF	(Argentina) ARG	Ezequiel Muñoz	32	0	29+3	0	0	0
25	DF	(Switzerland) SUI	Steve von Bergen	35	1	33+2	1	0	0
29	DF	(Argentina) ARG	Santiago García	34	1	30+2	1	1+1	0
89	DF	(Switzerland) SUI	Michel Morganella	31	0	30	0	0+1	0
Midfielders
5	MF	(Paraguay) PAR	Édgar Barreto	32	0	30	0	2	0
7	MF	(Italy) ITA	Nicolas Viola	7	0	1+5	0	1	0
8	MF	(Italy) ITA	Andrea Dossena	11	0	10+1	0	0	0
14	MF	(Brazil) BRA	Anselmo	5	1	2+3	1	0	0
18	MF	(Argentina) ARG	Alejandro Faurlín	6	0	3+3	0	0	0
20	MF	(Uruguay) URU	Egidio Arévalo Ríos	27	2	22+5	2	0	0
23	MF	(Italy) ITA	Massimo Donati	30	0	26+2	0	2	0
27	MF	(Slovenia) SVN	Josip Iličić	32	11	29+2	10	1	1
28	MF	(Slovenia) SVN	Jasmin Kurtić	32	1	26+5	1	0+1	0
33	MF	(Argentina) ARG	Mauro Formica	8	1	3+5	1	0	0
50	MF	(Italy) ITA	Giulio Sanseverino	3	0	2+1	0	0	0
Forwards
9	FW	(Argentina) ARG	Paulo Dybala	28	3	11+16	3	0+1	0
10	FW	(Italy) ITA	Fabrizio Miccoli (captain)	30	10	22+7	8	1	2
11	FW	(Uruguay) URU	Abel Hernández	15	1	6+8	1	0+1	0
16	FW	(Italy) ITA	Diego Fabbrini	8	1	5+3	1	0	0
17	FW	(Argentina) ARG	Mauro Boselli	8	0	5+3	0	0	0
19	FW	(Argentina) ARG	Mauricio Sperduti	0	0	0	0	0	0
24	FW	(Switzerland) SUI	Cephas Malele	3	0	0+3	0	0	0
Players sold or loaned out during the summer transfer market:
8	MF	(Italy) ITA	Giulio Migliaccio	1	0	1	0	0	0
Players sold or loaned out during the winter transfer market:
1	GK	(Albania) ALB	Samir Ujkani	20	0	19	0	1	0
4	DF	(Argentina) ARG	Mauro Cetto	5	0	2+1	0	2	0
15	DF	(Serbia) SRB	Milan Milanović	2	0	0	0	2	0
18	DF	(Chile) CHI	Carlos Labrín	2	0	0+1	0	1	0
31	DF	(Italy) ITA	Eros Pisano	13	0	7+4	0	2	0
14	MF	(Argentina) ARG	Nicolás Bertolo	8	0	3+4	0	1	0
17	MF	(Italy) ITA	Luigi Giorgi	11	3	6+4	2	1	1
16	MF	(Israel) ISR	Eran Zahavi	4	0	0+3	0	1	0
21	MF	(Italy) ITA	Franco Brienza	19	1	13+4	1	1+1	0
19	FW	(Croatia) CRO	Igor Budan	7	1	1+5	1	1	0
