= 2011–12 Novara Calcio season =

Novara Calcio
2011–12 season
- Chairman: Carlo Accornero
- Manager: Attilio Tesser; Emiliano Mondonico
- Serie A: 19th (relegated in B)
- Coppa Italia: Round of 16
- Top goalscorer: League: Rigoni (11); All: Rigoni (11)
- Highest home attendance: 16,328 vs. Napoli (11 December 2011)
- Lowest home attendance: 3,457 vs. Triestina (21 August 2011)
- Average home league attendance: 65,506 (Serie A)

== Season ==
In 2011–12, Novara spent its first season since 1955 in top flight: the team finished at 19th place, behind Lecce and ahead Cesena, being relegated in Serie B. In the whole league Novara won just seven games, achieving a double over Inter: 3–1 in Piola Stadium, 0–1 in San Siro.

== Squad ==
Squad at the end of season.

=== Goalkeepers ===
- (Italy) Achille Coser
- (Italy) Alberto Maria Fontana
- (Albania) Samir Ujkani

=== Defenders ===
- (Italy) Matteo Centurioni
- (Italy) Alberto Cossentino
- (France) Jean-Christophe Coubronne
- (Italy) Paolo Hernán Dellafiore
- (Argentina) Santiago García
- (Germany) Giuseppe Gemiti
- (Italy) Andrea Lisuzzo
- (Italy) Carlalberto Ludi
- (Chile) Carlos Labrín
- (Switzerland) Michel Morganella
- (Italy) Massimo Paci
- (Brazil) Gabriel Silva

=== Midfielders ===
- (Denmark) Daniel Jensen
- (Italy) Francesco Marianini
- (Italy) Andrea Mazzarani
- (Italy) Simone Pesce
- (Italy) Filippo Porcari
- (Serbia) Ivan Radovanović
- (Italy) Marco Rigoni

=== Attackers ===
- (Italy) Andrea Caracciolo
- (Brazil) Jeda
- (Italy) Giuseppe Mascara
- (Japan) Takayuki Morimoto
- (Italy) Raffaele Rubino

=== Manager ===
- (Italy) Attilio Tesser
- (Italy) Emiliano Mondonico

== League summary ==
Pos	Team	Pld	W	D	L	GF	GA	GD	Pts	Qualification or relegation
16	Palermo	38	11	10	17	52	62	−10	43 (Note: Cagliari finished ahead of Palermo on goal difference : Cagliari 2–1 Palermo, Palermo 3–2 Cagliari; Cagliari = –9, Palermo = –10.)	
17	Genoa	38	11	9	18	50	69	−19	42	
18	Lecce (R, D, R)	38	8	12	18	40	56	−16	36	Relegation to Serie C1 (Note: Lecce were originally relegated to Serie B, but further relegated to Lega Pro Prima Divisione due to involvement in the 2011–12 Italian football scandal.)
19	Novara (R)	38	7	11	20	35	65	−30	32	Relegation to Serie B
20	Cesena (R)	38	4	10	24	24	60	−36	22	Relegation to Serie B

Source: Lega Serie A
Rules for classification: 1) points; 2) head-to-head points; 3) head-to-head goal difference; 4) head-to-head goals scored; 5) goal difference; 6) number of goals scored
(D) Disqualified; (R) Relegated
Notes:

Overall								Home						Away					
Pld	W	D	L	GF	GA	GD	Pts	W	D	L	GF	GA	GD	W	D	L	GF	GA	GD
38	7	11	20	35	65	−30	32	5	8	6	20	27	−7	2	3	14	15	38	−23

Updated to 13 May 2012.
