= Andrea Mazzarani =

Italian footballer (born 1989)

Personal information
- Full name: Andrea Mazzarani
- Date of birth: 6 November 1989 (age 37)
- Place of birth: Rome, Italy
- Height: 1.74 m (5 ft 9 in)
- Position: Midfielder

Team information
- Current team: Folgore Caratese

Youth career
- Cisco Roma

Senior career*
Years	Team	Apps	(Gls)
2007–2008	Cisco Roma	27	(4)
2008–2013	Udinese	0	(0)
2009–2010	→ Crotone (loan)	30	(3)
2010–2011	→ Modena (loan)	37	(9)
2011–2012	→ Novara (loan)	20	(1)
2013	Napoli	0	(0)
2013	→ Modena (loan)	15	(3)
2013	Udinese	0	(0)
2013–2016	Modena	36	(9)
2014–2015	→ Virtus Entella (loan)	35	(8)
2016	Crotone	0	(0)
2016–2018	Catania	64	(16)
2018–2019	Salernitana	16	(1)
2019–2021	Catania	27	(7)
2021	Livorno	15	(2)
2021–2022	Carrarese	13	(1)
2022	→ Pergolettese (loan)	11	(1)
2022–2024	Pergolettese	67	(8)
2024–	Folgore Caratese	0	(0)

International career
2007–2008	Italy U-19	5	(1)
2008–2009	Italy U-20	12	(1)
- * Club domestic league appearances and goals as of 3 May 2024

Andrea Mazzarani (born 6 November 1989) is an Italian professional footballer playing as a midfielder for Serie C Group A club Folgore Caratese.

== Club career ==
In June 2011 Modena decided to sign him but Udinese excised the counter-option.

On 24 July 2019, he returned to Catania on a 2-year contract.

On 28 January 2021, he moved to Livorno.

On 15 July 2021, he signed a two-year contract with Carrarese. On 31 January 2022, Mazzarani was loaned to Pergolettese. On 12 July 2022, Mazzarani's contract with Carrarese was terminated by mutual consent. On the same day, he returned to Pergolettese on a two-year contract.

== International career ==
He represented Italy at the 2008 UEFA European Under-19 Football Championship, where they came second, and at the 2009 FIFA U-20 World Cup.

== Career statistics ==
=== Club ===
As of match played 22 December 2021

Appearances and goals by club, season and competition
Club	Season	League			National Cup		League Cup		Other		Total	
Club	Season	Division	Apps	Goals	Apps	Goals	Apps	Goals	Apps	Goals	Apps	Goals
Cisco Roma	2007–08	Serie C2	27	4	—		—		—		27	4
Udinese	2008–09	Serie A	0	0	0	0	—		—		0	0
Crotone (loan)	2009–10	Serie B	30	3	0	0	—		—		30	3
Modena (loan)	2010–11	Serie B	37	9	2	1	—		—		39	10
Novara (loan)	2011–12	Serie A	20	1	2	0	—		—		22	1
Napoli	2012–13	Serie A	0	0	0	0	—		—		0	0
Modena (loan)	2012–13	Serie B	15	3	0	0	—		—		15	3
Modena	2013–14	Serie B	33	9	1	0	—		3 (Note: Appearance(s) in Promotion Playoffs)	0	37	9
Modena	2015–16	Serie B	14	3	0	0	—		—		14	3
Modena	Total		62	15	1	0	0	0	3	0	66	15
Virtus Entella (loan)	2014–15	Serie B	33	7	2	1	—		2 (Note: Appearance(s) in Relegation Playoffs)	1	37	9
Crotone	2016–17	Serie A	0	0	0	0	—		—		0	0
Catania	2016–17	Lega Pro	28	9	—		—		1	0	29	9
Catania	2017–18	Serie C	31	7	—		3	1	3	0	37	8
Catania	Total		59	16	0	0	3	1	4	0	66	17
Salernitana	2018–19	Serie B	15	1	1	0	—		1	0	17	1
Catania	2019–20	Serie C	27	7	1	0	3	0	2	0	33	7
Livorno	2020–21	Serie C	15	2	—		—		—		15	2
Carrarese	2021–22	Serie C	13	1	—		1	0	—		14	1
Career total			338	66	9	2	7	1	12	1	366	70
