= Samir Ujkani =

Kosovan footballer (born 1988)

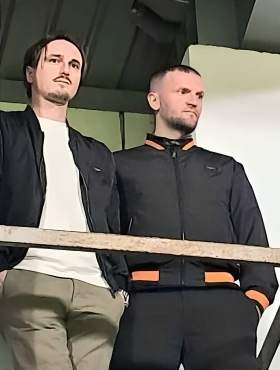
- Samir Ujkani, 2026

Personal information
- Date of birth: 5 July 1988 (age 38)
- Place of birth: Vushtrri, SFR Yugoslavia (now Kosovo)
- Height: 1.88 m (6 ft 2 in)
- Position: Goalkeeper

Team information
- Current team: Kosovo (sports director)

Youth career
- 2001–2006: Ingelmunster
- 2006–2007: Anderlecht
- 2007–2008: Palermo

Senior career*
Years	Team	Apps	(Gls)
2007–2015	Palermo	34	(0)
2009–2012	→ Novara (loan)	86	(0)
2013	→ Chievo (loan)	0	(0)
2015–2017	Genoa	0	(0)
2016	→ Latina (loan)	21	(0)
2016–2017	→ Pisa (loan)	35	(0)
2017–2018	Cremonese	37	(0)
2018–2019	Çaykur Rizespor	1	(0)
2019–2021	Torino	2	(0)
2021–2023	Empoli	1	(0)
Total		217	(0)

International career
2007–2009	Albania U21	6	(0)
2008–2014	Albania	20	(0)
2014–2022	Kosovo	36	(0)

Managerial career
- 2023–: Kosovo (sports director)
- * Club domestic league appearances and goals

Samir Ujkani (born 5 July 1988) is a former Kosovan professional footballer who played as a goalkeeper and is currently the sports director of the Kosovo national team.

Ujkani began his youth career with Ingelmunster before moving to Anderlecht and later to Palermo. He started his senior career with Palermo in 2007, making 34 league appearances for the club. During his time under contract with Palermo, he was loaned to Novara, Chievo and later to Latina and Pisa while contracted to other Italian clubs.

Ujkani later played for Cremonese, Çaykur Rizespor, Torino and Empoli, accumulating 217 club appearances across his professional career.

At international level, he represented Albania U21 and the Albania senior team before switching allegiance to represent the Kosovo national team, earning 36 caps for Kosovo between 2014 and 2022. In 2023, he was appointed sports director of the Kosovo national team.

== Early life ==
Ujkani was born in Resnik, a village near Vushtrri, SFR Yugoslavia (now Kosovo). His family then moved to Belgium six years after his birth.

== Club career ==
=== Youth clubs ===
At the age of thirteen, Ujkani enrolled into Ingelmunster, spending six years there before moving to Anderlecht. The Anderlecht football academy has a reputation of producing talented goalkeepers such as Jacky Munaron. Ujkani played until June 2007 for the Anderlecht Under-19s, and made also ten appearances with their reserves team. In June 2007, he agreed to sign a five-year contract with Palermo of Italy's Serie A.

=== Palermo ===
Since then, Ujkani served as unused substitute in two UEFA Cup matches for Palermo, and several Serie A matches as well. He was confirmed as third-choice goalkeeper for the Rosanero's 2008–09 season, and later promoted as second goalkeeper after the club chose to transfer-list veteran goalkeeper Alberto Fontana.

On 26 April 2009, Ujkani made his professional debut with Palermo, replacing injured Marco Amelia during a Serie A match against Milan at the San Siro. His performance was congratulated from Kaká at the end of the match. In July 2009, he was loaned out to Lega Pro Prima Divisione club Novara in exchange with Giacomo Brichetto, also in order to gain first team experience.

On 14 June 2012, Palermo owner Maurizio Zamparini confirmed that Ujkani will be playing on Palermo for the 2012–13 season. On 22 June 2012, Palermo announced from their website to have re-acquired the full transfer rights of Ujkani and fellow Novara player Michel Morganella.

For Palermo's 2013–14 season, spent in Serie B after its previous season's relegation, he was used as a second-choice goalkeeper – receiving playing time – and being praised for his development relative to his previous stint with Palermo. During December and January 2014, he became temporary first-choice to cover for the injured Stefano Sorrentino. His contract with Palermo expired 30 June 2015.

==== Loan at Novara ====
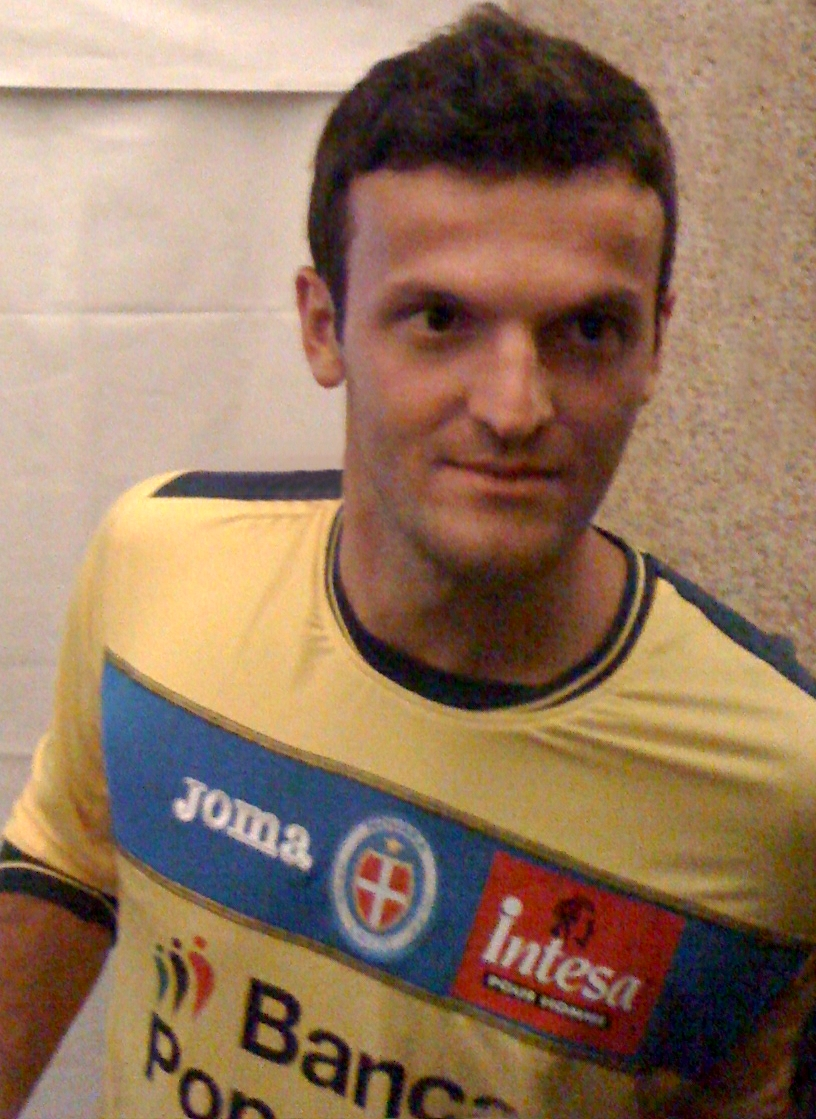
Ujkani with Novara in 2011

He was loaned to Novara, and the loan was extended in 2010. On 31 January 2011, Palermo announced it had part of Ujkani's transfer rights to Novara as part of a bid involving striker Pablo González (€5 million).

==== Loan at Chievo ====
After the arrival of goalkeeper Stefano Sorrentino at Palermo, Ujkani moved on loan to Chievo on 29 January 2013. In his short stint there, he did not play a single game, serving as back-up to Christian Puggioni, and was not acquired by the Verona-based club, thus making his return to Palermo by the end of season.

=== Genoa ===
On 19 July 2015, Genoa announced the signing of Ujkani on a free transfer, he did not play a single game.

==== Loan at Latina ====
On 8 January 2016, Ujkani joined Serie B side Latina on loan. On 16 January 2016, he made his debut in a 1–0 home defeat against former club Novara after being named in the starting line-up.

==== Loan at Pisa ====
On 11 July 2016, Ujkani joined Serie B side Pisa on loan. On 7 August 2016, he made his debut with Pisa in the second round of 2016–17 Coppa Italia against Brescia after being named in the starting line-up.

=== Cremonese ===
On 14 July 2017, Ujkani signed with the newly promoted team of Serie B side Cremonese. On 6 August 2017, he made his debut with Cremonese in the second round of 2017–18 Coppa Italia against Virtus Entella after being named in the starting line-up.

=== Çaykur Rizespor ===
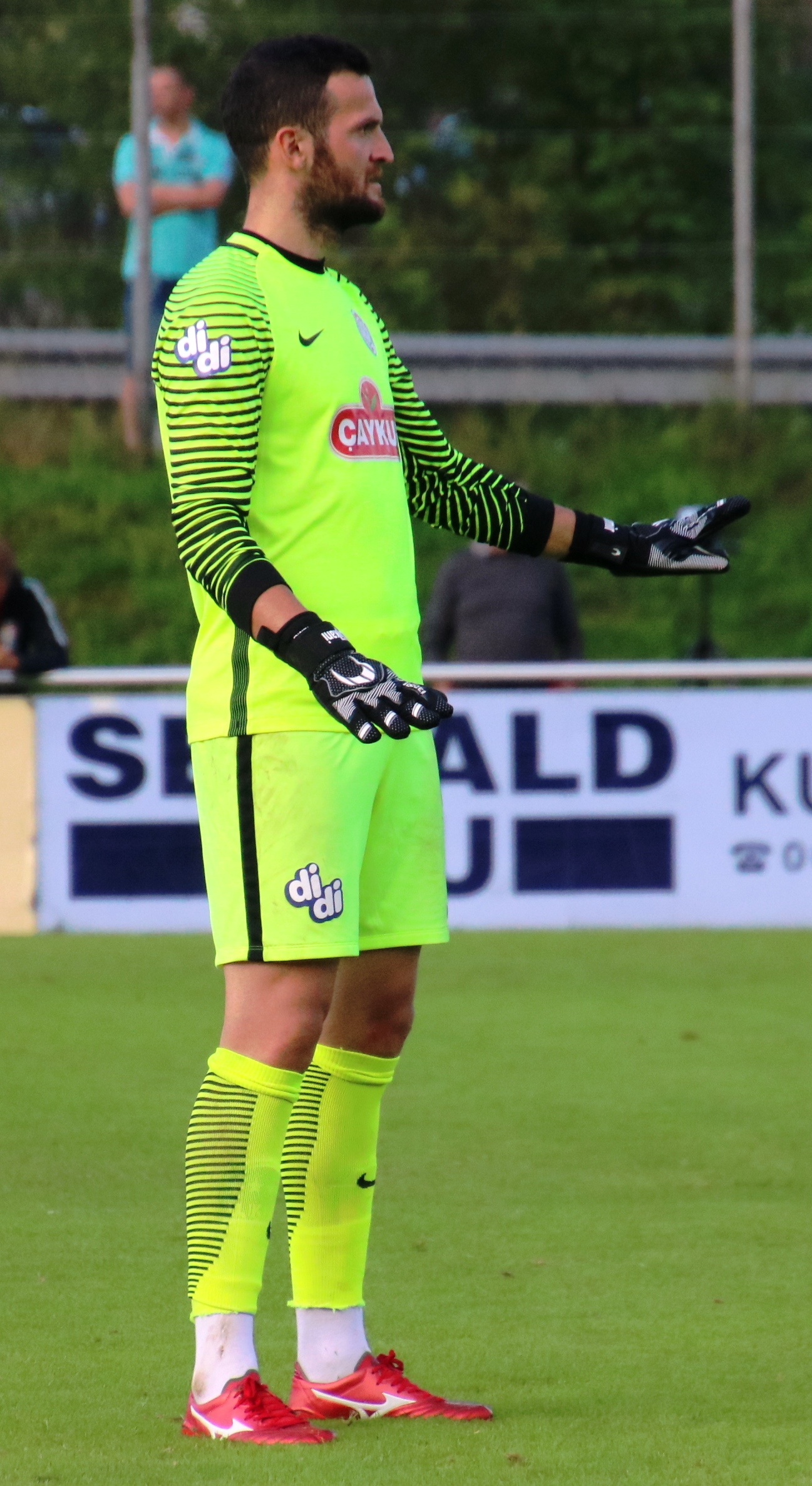
Ujkani with Çaykur Rizespor in 2018

On 18 July 2018, Ujkani signed with the newly promoted team of Süper Lig side Çaykur Rizespor, on a three-year contract. On 26 September 2018, he made his debut for Çaykur Rizespor in the third round of the 2018–19 Turkish Cup against Tarsus Idman Yurdu after being named in the starting line-up.

From the beginning of 2019, Ujkani was excluded from the first team squad alongside 4 other foreign players and moved down to the U21 squad.

=== Retirement ===
On 1 November 2023 he announced his retirement from playing after 4 months being unattached since contract expiration with Empoli.

== International career ==
=== Albania ===
Ujkani received an Albanian passport in May 2007, and started playing for the Albania U21. He made his debut on 1 June in a European qualification match against Italy U21. On 6 October 2008, he received his first senior call-up for the 2010 FIFA World Cup qualification qualifying matches with Hungary and Portugal. He made his full senior debut on 10 June 2009 in a 1–1 draw with Georgia in Albania. On 29 February 2012, Ujkani saved two penalties in a 2–1 friendly win against Georgia, becoming the first Albania goalkeeper to save two penalties in a single international match. Ujkani lost his starting place to Etrit Berisha during the 2014 World Cup qualification.

=== Kosovo ===
On 2 March 2014. Ujkani received a call-up from Kosovo for the first permitted by FIFA match against Haiti and made his debut after being named in the starting line-up.

== Career statistics ==
=== Club ===
Club	Season	League			Cup		Other (Note: Including other competitions, such as Supercoppa di Serie C)		Total	
Club	Season	Division	Apps	Goals	Apps	Goals	Apps	Goals	Apps	Goals
Palermo	2007–08	Serie A	0	0	0	0	—		0	0
Palermo	2008–09	Serie A	1	0	0	0	—		1	0
Palermo	2012–13	Serie A	19	0	1	0	—		20	0
Palermo	2013–14	Serie B	11	0	0	0	—		11	0
Palermo	2014–15	Serie A	3	0	1	0	—		4	0
Palermo	Total		34	0	2	0	—		36	0
Novara (loan)	2009–10	Lega Pro Prima Divisione	23	0	3	0	1	0	27	0
Novara (loan)	2010–11	Serie B	39	0	1	0	—		40	0
Novara (loan)	2011–12	Serie A	24	0	2	0	—		26	0
Novara (loan)	Total		86	0	6	0	1	0	93	0
Chievo (loan)	2012–13	Serie A	0	0	0	0	—		0	0
Genoa	2015–16	Serie A	0	0	0	0	—		0	0
Latina (loan)	2015–16	Serie B	21	0	0	0	—		21	0
Pisa (loan)	2016–17	Serie B	35	0	3	0	—		38	0
Cremonese	2017–18	Serie B	37	0	1	0	—		38	0
Çaykur Rizespor	2018–19	Süper Lig	1	0	4	0	—		5	0
Torino	2019–20	Serie A	1	0	0	0	—		1	0
Torino	2020–21	Serie A	1	0	0	0	—		1	0
Torino	Total		2	0	0	0	—		2	0
Empoli	2021–22	Serie A	0	0	1	0	—		1	0
Empoli	2022–23	Serie A	0	0	0	0	—		0	0
Empoli	Total		0	0	1	0	—		1	0
Career total			216	0	17	0	1	0	235	0

=== International ===
National team	Year	Apps	Goals
Albania	2009	4	0
Albania	2010	1	0
Albania	2011	8	0
Albania	2012	5	0
Albania	2013	2	0
Total		20	0
Kosovo	2014	2	0
Kosovo	2015	2	0
Kosovo	2016	5	0
Kosovo	2017	7	0
Kosovo	2018	8	0
Kosovo	2019	2	0
Kosovo	2020	2	0
Kosovo	2021	4	0
Kosovo	2022	4	0
Total		36	0
