= Abel Hernández =

Uruguayan footballer (born 1990)

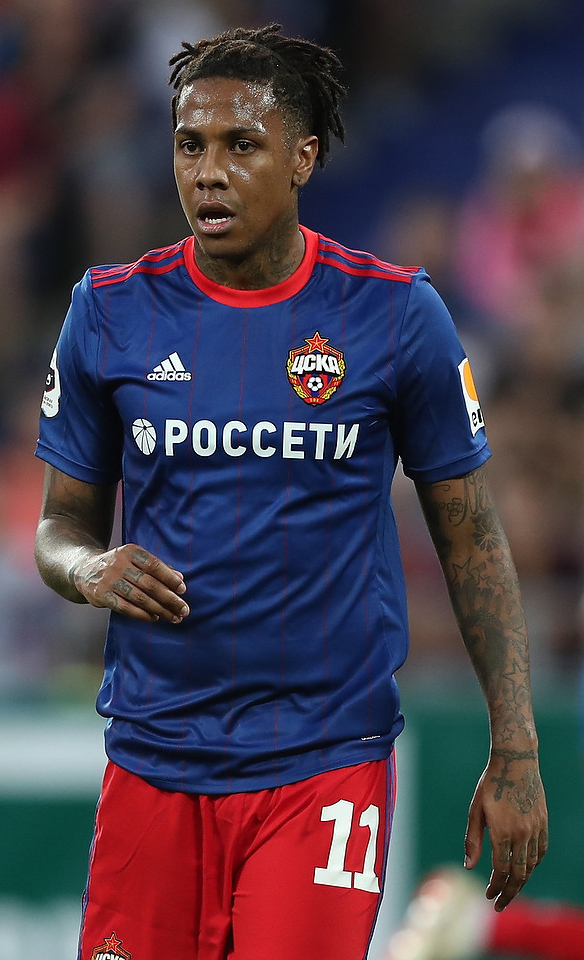
- Hernández with CSKA in 2018

Personal information
- Full name: Abel Mathías Hernández Platero
- Date of birth: 8 August 1990 (age 36)
- Place of birth: Pando, Uruguay
- Height: 1.85 m (6 ft 1 in)
- Position: Forward

Team information
- Current team: Peñarol
- Number: 99

Youth career
- 2000–2001: Peñarol
- 2001–2006: Central Español

Senior career*
Years	Team	Apps	(Gls)
2006–2008	Central Español	30	(9)
2008–2009	Peñarol	8	(3)
2009–2014	Palermo	111	(31)
2014–2018	Hull City	99	(36)
2018–2019	CSKA Moscow	14	(3)
2019–2020	Al Ahli	17	(7)
2020–2021	Internacional	25	(4)
2021–2022	Fluminense	28	(6)
2022	Atlético San Luis	35	(11)
2023	Peñarol	22	(12)
2024	Rosario Central	4	(0)
2024–2025	Liverpool Montevideo	42	(27)
2026–	Peñarol	24	(9)

International career
2008–2010	Uruguay U20	11	(9)
2012	Uruguay Olympic	3	(1)
2010–2017	Uruguay	29	(11)
Medal record
Representing Uruguay
Men's football
Copa América
Winner	2011 Argentina
- * Club domestic league appearances and goals as of 31 October 2026

Abel Mathías Hernández Platero (born 8 August 1990) is a Uruguayan professional footballer who plays as a forward for Uruguayan Primera División club Peñarol.

Hernández began his career with Central Español and Peñarol, and spent five and a half seasons in Italy with Palermo before joining Hull City for a club record £10 million in September 2014. Four years later, he joined CSKA Moscow, and upon his release signed for Al Ahli in 2019. After he was released by the Qatari club a year later, he moved to Brazil, first joining Internacional and later on Fluminense.

A full international since 2010, Hernández has competed at various international tournaments with Uruguay, including their victory at the 2011 Copa América.

== Club career ==
=== Early career ===
Nicknamed La Joya, he started his professional career with Uruguayan side Central Español, immediately scoring five goals in his first four games. He was subsequently acquired by Peñarol, where he played a handful of games and also gained a spot into the Under-20 Uruguayan side.

=== Palermo ===
On 2 February 2009, Italian Serie A club Palermo completed the signing of Hernández, where he joined fellow Uruguayan Edinson Cavani. He was presented by Palermo only one month later, due to some health concerns regarding a cardiac arrhythmia that led to a small surgical intervention. He made his first team debut on 15 March, replacing Edinson Cavani in the final minutes of a 5–2 home win to Lecce. He then won the Trofeo Giacinto Facchetti with the Primavera under-19 team in June 2009.

After missing the initial weeks of the 2009–10 Serie A due to injury and his participation in the 2009 FIFA U-20 World Cup. Hernández played his first game on 29 October 2009. Coming on as a half-time substitute for Cristian Melinte, he scored in the 5–3 loss to league leaders Internazionale.

In 2012–13, Hernández scored only 1 goal in 14 league matches as Palermo suffered relegation. He equalised as a substitute against Udinese in the 81st minute of a home match on 8 May, only for Medhi Benatia to score a winner for the visitors two minutes later. The following campaign, he struck 14 times in 28 Serie B games as the Sicilians returned to the top flight, netting braces in away victories over Padova and Siena, both of which included a penalty kick.

=== Hull City ===
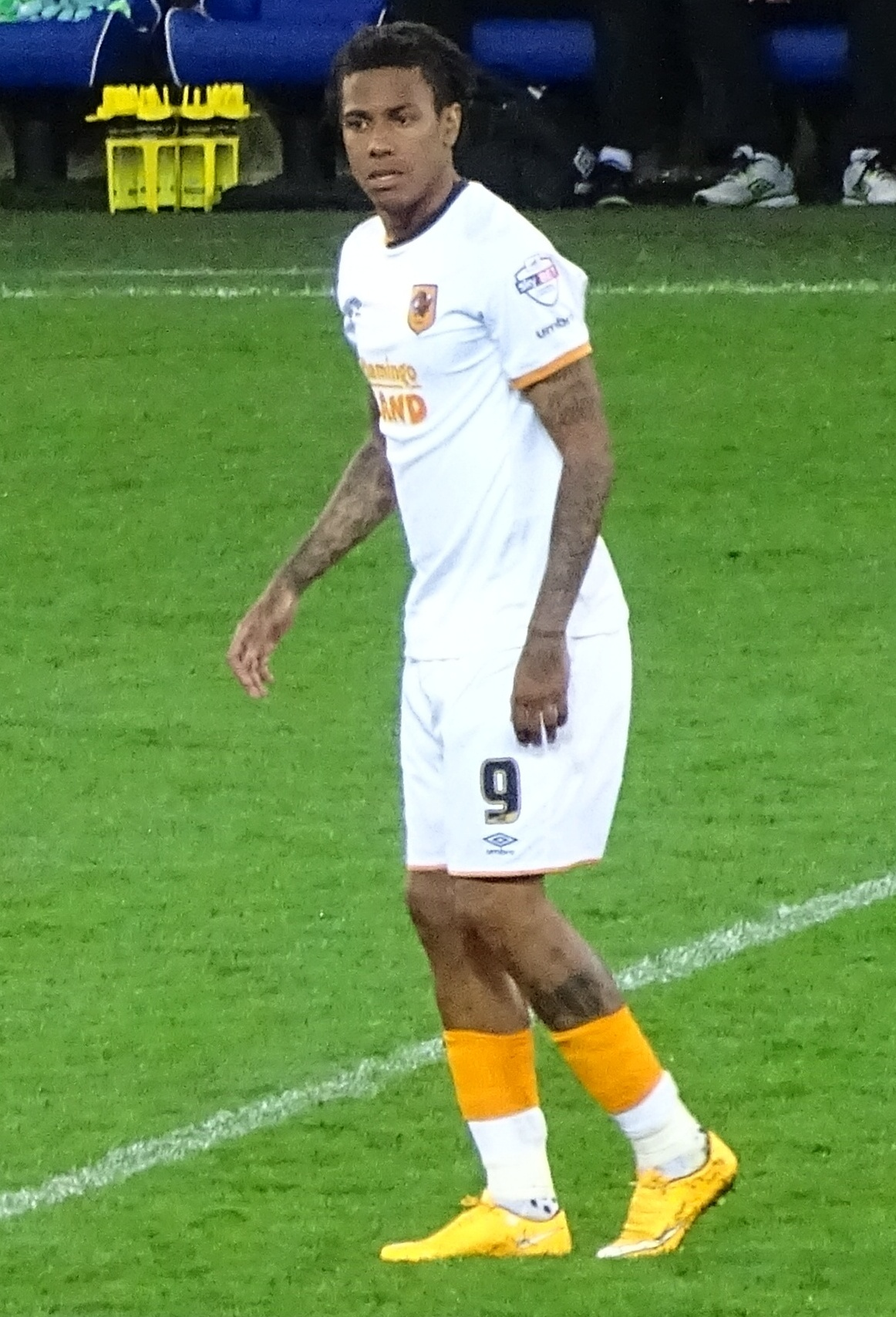
Hernandez playing for Hull City in 2015.

Hernández signed for English club Hull City on 1 September 2014 for a club record £10 million on a three-year contract, with the club having an option for a fourth year. Two weeks later he made his debut at the KC Stadium, and scored the first goal of a 2–2 draw with West Ham United. In his next home game against Manchester City on the 27th, he won a penalty after being fouled in the area by Eliaquim Mangala, and scored it in an eventual 2–4 defeat. His next goal came when he put his team into the lead during a 2–2 away draw against Arsenal.

Hull were relegated on 24 May 2015 after a goalless draw with Manchester United on the final day of the season. During the match, Hérnandez punched United defender Phil Jones in an off-the-ball incident, not seen by match officials. Two days later, he was charged with violent conduct by The Football Association and subsequently given a three-match ban.

On 16 January 2016, in a Championship match against Charlton Athletic, Hernández scored his first club career hat-trick in a game that finished 6–0, taking his league tally to 14 goals for the season. With six goals in four matches, he won January's Football League Championship Player of the Month, and his manager Steve Bruce won the equivalent. At the club's annual awards, held on 3 May 2016, Hernández was named Player of the Year and Players' Player of the Year.

In January 2017, Hernández missed two penalties in the space of two minutes in a FA Cup fourth round match verses Fulham. His first spot kick was saved by Fulham goalkeeper Marcus Bettinelli before Bettinelli brought-down Hernández while he attempted to reach the rebound. Hernández stepped up once more and was again denied by Bettinelli.

During the 2017–18 season, Hernández ruptured his Achilles tendon against Wolverhampton Wanderers, the injury would keep Hernandez out for several months. He returned from injury on 6 March 2018 against Millwall, scoring in a 2–1 defeat. He finished the season with eight goals in just ten appearances.

Hernández was offered a new contract by Hull at the end of the 2017–18 season. However, on 4 June, Hernández and Hull City announced he would be leaving the club upon his contract expiry after failing to reach an agreement on signing a new contract offer. He then held discussions with Leeds United over a potential move.

=== CSKA Moscow ===
On 1 August 2018, Russian Premier League club CSKA Moscow announced the signing of Hernández on a three-year contract. He scored his first goal in Russia on 11 August 2018 in his second match in the league, converting the penalty kick to secure an away 1–1 draw against Yenisey Krasnoyarsk. In his next match, on 18 August, he scored again and provided an assist in a 3–0 victory over Arsenal Tula. He played as a 2nd half substitute in CSKA's shock 3–0 win against Real Madrid at the Santiago Bernabeu in the Champions League. The defeat was Real Madrid's heaviest defeat in Europe at home in their history.

After making only 15 appearances due to injuries, he was released from his contract by mutual consent on 27 May 2019.

=== Al Ahli ===
Hernández was linked with Nottingham Forest after his release from the Russian capital, but instead signed for Al Ahli SC of the Qatar Stars League, believing that the move would help him back into the national team.

=== Internacional ===
On 28 August 2020, Hernández joined Campeonato Brasileiro club Internacional on a free transfer, signing a one-year contract.

In December 2021, Atlético San Luis announced the signing of Hernández on a free transfer.

In January 2024, he joined Rosario Central on a year-long contract with the option for a further year. He played just five times before suffering a tendon injury in April, and his contract was terminated in July.

On 6 September 2024, he joined Liverpool Montevideo on a free transfer.

== International career ==
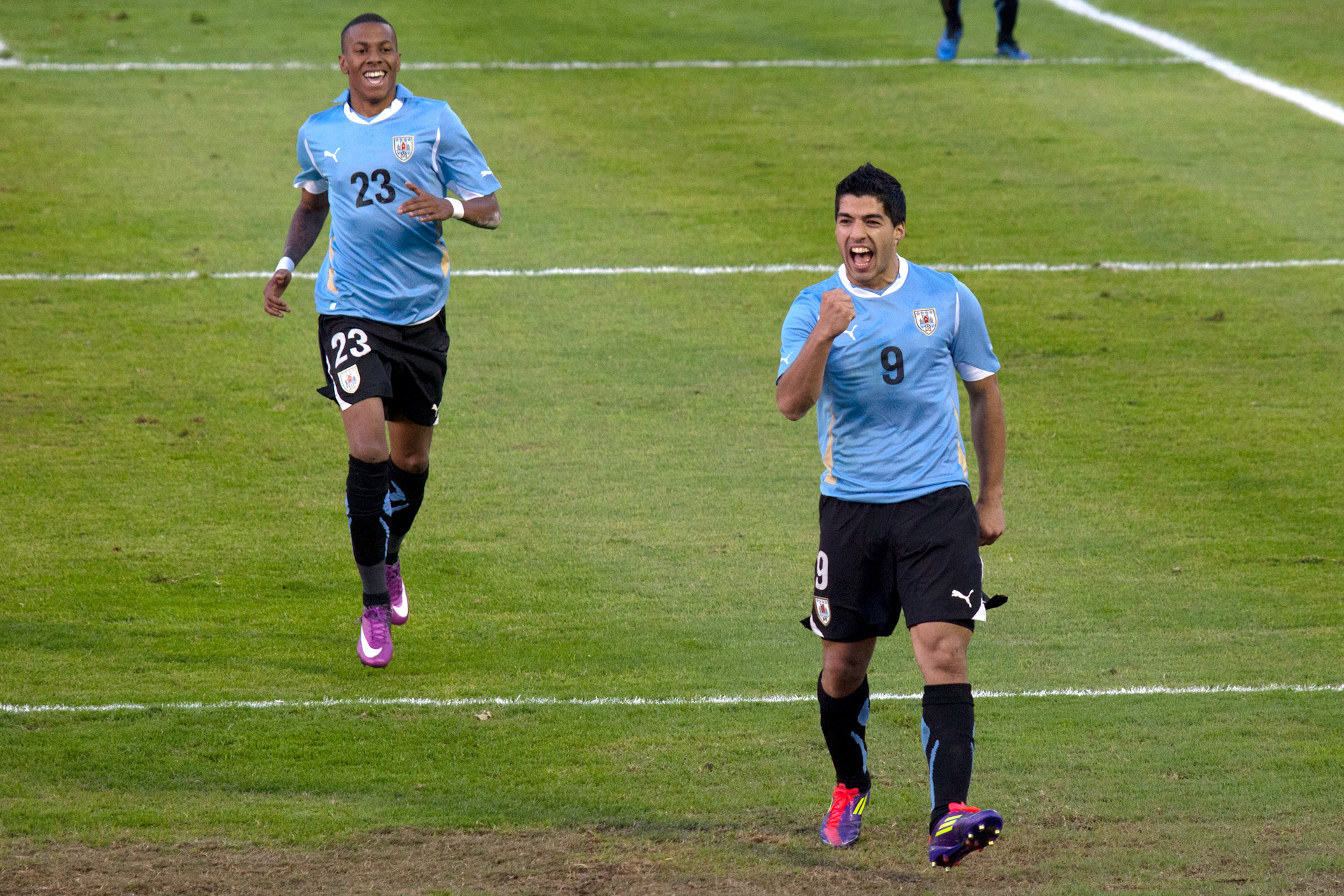
Hernández (left) and Luis Suárez celebrating a goal against the Netherlands in June 2011

On 27 July 2010, Hernández was called up for his debut with Uruguay, a friendly against Angola in Lisbon. The game, which was played on 11 August, ended in a 2–0 win for Uruguay, with Hernández being fouled for the penalty, which was scored by Edinson Cavani. Hernández then scored the second goal for the Celeste during injury time. He was part of the Uruguayan team which won the 2011 Copa América in Argentina, making substitute appearances in their opening match and their semi-final victory, both against Peru. He was chosen by Óscar Tabárez for the London 2012 Olympic Uruguay squad, making a half-time substitute appearance in the 0–2 defeat to Senegal at Wembley Stadium, in an eventual group stage exit.

The following year, Hernández was selected for Uruguay's squad at the 2013 FIFA Confederations Cup. In his only appearance, the final group stage match against Tahiti, Hernández scored a first-half hat-trick and went on to become the fourth player in Confederations Cup history to score four goals in one match after converting a second-half penalty goal in Uruguay's 8–0 victory. He was named man of the match for this performance. Hernández was also included in the Uruguayan squad for the 2014 FIFA World Cup, making substitute appearances in their opener against Costa Rica and round of 16 match against Colombia, both defeats. At the 2015 Copa América, he made one start and two substitute appearances as Uruguay reached the quarter-finals.

Hernández who was a regular in his national team squads, had just recovered from injury towards the end of the 2017–18 season, missed out on a 2018 World Cup squad place on 16 May 2018, with Edinson Cavani, Luis Suárez, Cristhian Stuani and Maxi Gómez favoured ahead of him.

== Career statistics ==
=== Club ===
As of 31 October 2025

Appearances and goals by club, season and competition
Club	Season	League			National cup		League cup		Continental		Other		Total	
Club	Season	Division	Apps	Goals	Apps	Goals	Apps	Goals	Apps	Goals	Apps	Goals	Apps	Goals
Central Español	2006–07	Uruguayan Primera División	6	0	—		—		—		—		6	0
Central Español	2007–08	Uruguayan Primera División	24	9	—		—		—		—		24	9
Central Español	Total		30	9	—		—		—		—		30	9
Peñarol	2008–09	Uruguayan Primera División	8	3	—		—		—		—		8	3
Palermo	2008–09	Serie A	6	0	—		—		—		—		6	0
Palermo	2009–10	Serie A	21	7	1	0	—		—		—		22	7
Palermo	2010–11	Serie A	22	3	3	1	—		4 (Note: Appearance(s) in UEFA Europa League)	4	—		29	8
Palermo	2011–12	Serie A	20	6	—		—		—		—		20	6
Palermo	2012–13	Serie A	14	1	1	0	—		—		—		15	1
Palermo	2013–14	Serie B	28	14	2	0	—		—		—		30	14
Palermo	Total		111	31	7	1	—		4	4	—		122	36
Hull City	2014–15	Premier League	25	4	1	0	0	0	—		—		26	4
Hull City	2015–16	Championship	39	20	0	0	3	1	—		3 (Note: Appearance(s) in Championship play-offs)	1	45	22
Hull City	2016–17	Premier League	24	4	2	1	3	0	—		—		29	5
Hull City	2017–18	Championship	10	8	0	0	0	0	—		—		10	8
Hull City	Total		98	36	3	1	6	1	—		3	1	110	39
CSKA Moscow	2018–19	Russian Premier League	14	3	0	0	—		1 (Note: Appearance in UEFA Champions League)	0	—		15	3
Al Ahli	2019–20	Qatar Stars League	17	7	—		—		—		5 (Note: Appearance(s) in Qatari Stars Cup)	6	22	13
Internacional	2020	Série A	23	3	3	0	—		3 (Note: Appearance(s) in Copa Libertadores)	2	2 (Note: Appearance(s) in Campeonato Gaúcho)	1	31	6
Fluminense	2021	Série A	23	3	5	2	—		7	1	5 (Note: Appearance(s) in Campeonato Carioca)	3	40	9
Atlético San Luis	2021–22	Liga MX	18	3	—		—		—		—		18	3
Atlético San Luis	2022–23	Liga MX	17	8	—		—		—		—		17	8
Atlético San Luis	Total		35	11	—		—		—		—		35	11
Peñarol	2023	Uruguayan Primera División	22	12	0	0	—		4 (Note: Appearances in Copa Sudamericana)	0	—		26	12
Rosario Central	2024	Argentine Primera División	4	0	1	0	—		0	0	—		5	0
Liverpool	2024	Uruguayan Primera División	5	2	—		—		—		—		5	2
Liverpool	2025	Uruguayan Primera División	37	25	2	1	—		—		—		39	26
Liverpool	Total		42	27	2	1	—		—		—		44	28
Peñarol	2026	Uruguayan Primera División	24	9	0	0	—		5	0	0	0	29	9
Career total			451	154	21	5	6	1	24	7	15	11	517	178

=== International ===
As of match played 13 June 2016

Appearances and goals by national team and year
National team	Year	Apps	Goals
Uruguay	2010	1	1
Uruguay	2011	7	2
Uruguay	2013	3	4
Uruguay	2014	7	1
Uruguay	2015	7	2
Uruguay	2016	3	1
Uruguay	2017	1	0
Total		29	11

As of match played 13 June 2016
Scores and results list Uruguay's goal tally first, score column indicates score after each Hernández goal.

List of international goals scored by Abel Hernández
No.	Date	Venue	Cap	Opponent	Score	Result	Competition
1	11 August 2010	Estádio do Restelo, Lisbon, Portugal	1	Angola	2–0	2–0	Friendly
2	29 March 2011	Aviva Stadium, Dublin, Ireland	3	Republic of Ireland	3–1	3–2	Friendly
3	2 September 2011	Metalist Oblast Sports Complex, Kharkiv, Ukraine	8	Ukraine	3–2	3–2	Friendly
4	23 June 2013	Itaipava Arena Pernambuco, Recife, Brazil	10	Tahiti	1–0	8–0	2013 FIFA Confederations Cup
5	23 June 2013	Itaipava Arena Pernambuco, Recife, Brazil	10	Tahiti	2–0	8–0	2013 FIFA Confederations Cup
6	23 June 2013	Itaipava Arena Pernambuco, Recife, Brazil	10	Tahiti	4–0	8–0	2013 FIFA Confederations Cup
7	23 June 2013	Itaipava Arena Pernambuco, Recife, Brazil	10	Tahiti	6–0	8–0	2013 FIFA Confederations Cup
8	5 September 2014	Sapporo Dome, Sapporo, Japan	15	Japan	2–0	2–0	Friendly
9	6 June 2015	Estadio Centenario, Montevideo, Uruguay	19	Guatemala	5–0	5–1	Friendly
10	13 October 2015	Estadio Centenario, Montevideo, Uruguay	24	Colombia	3–0	3–0	2018 FIFA World Cup qualification
11	13 June 2016	Levi's Stadium, Santa Clara, United States	27	Jamaica	1–0	3–0	Copa América Centenario

== Honours ==
Palermo

- Serie B: 2013–14

Hull City

- Football League Championship play-offs: 2016

Liverpool F.C. (Montevideo)

- Torneo Apertura 2025

Uruguay

- Copa América: 2011

Individual

- South American U-20 Championship joint top scorer: 2009
- Football League Championship Player of the Month: January 2016
