= Alberto Acquadro =

Italian football player (born 1996)

Personal information
- Date of birth: 27 March 1996 (age 30)
- Place of birth: Gattinara, Italy
- Height: 1.80 m (5 ft 11 in)
- Position: Midfielder

Team information
- Current team: Reggina
- Number: 8

Youth career
- –2013: Biellese
- 2013–2015: Borgosesia
- 2014–2015: → Palermo (loan)

Senior career*
Years	Team	Apps	(Gls)
2013–2016	Borgosesia	15	(1)
2015–2016	→ Venezia (loan)	31	(4)
2016–2018	Venezia	26	(0)
2017–2018	→ Triestina (loan)	26	(1)
2018–2019	Fano	27	(2)
2019–2020	Pineto	24	(4)
2020–2021	Taranto	12	(1)
2021	ACR Messina	1	(0)
2021	SN Notaresco	13	(2)
2021–2022	Siena	19	(2)
2022	Vis Pesaro	17	(2)
2022–2023	Turris	32	(1)
2023–2024	Trapani	29	(3)
2024–2025	Siracusa	28	(3)
2025–2026	Scafatese	32	(2)
2026–	Reggina	0	(0)
- * Club domestic league appearances and goals as of 3 May 2026

Alberto Acquadro (born 27 March 1996) is an Italian footballer who plays as a midfielder for Serie D club Reggina.

== Career ==
He made his Serie C debut for Venezia on 27 August 2016 in a game against Forlì.

On 23 July 2021, he signed with Siena.

On 20 January 2022, he signed a contract with Vis Pesaro until the end of the 2022–23 season, with an option to extend for an additional year.

On 18 July 2022, Acquadro moved to Turris on a two-year deal.
