= Carlalberto Ludi =

Italian footballer (born 1982)

Personal information
- Full name: Carlalberto Ludi
- Date of birth: 24 December 1982 (age 43)
- Place of birth: Viadana, Italy
- Height: 1.87 m (6 ft 1 1/2 in)
- Position: Centre-back

Senior career*
Years	Team	Apps	(Gls)
2001–2002	Pisa	30	(1)
2002	→ Reggiana (loan)	0	(0)
2003	→ Brescello (loan)	8	(1)
2003–2004	→ Prato	20	(0)
2004–2005	Pro Vercelli	22	(0)
2005–2006	Montevarchi	32	(2)
2006–2016	Novara	137	(3)
- * Club domestic league appearances and goals

Carlalberto Ludi (born 24 December 1982) is an Italian former footballer who played as a centre-back. He spent ten years playing for Novara.

== Honours ==
- Lega Pro Prima Divisione: 2010
