= Giulio Sanseverino =

Italian footballer (born 1994)

Personal information
- Date of birth: 10 February 1994 (age 32)
- Place of birth: Palermo, Italy
- Height: 1.72 m (5 ft 8 in)
- Position: Midfielder

Team information
- Current team: ASD Partinico Audace

Youth career
- 2002–2007: ASD Cantera Ribolla
- 2007–2012: Palermo

Senior career*
Years	Team	Apps	(Gls)
2012–2015	Palermo	4	(0)
2014	→ Perugia (loan)	6	(0)
2014–2015	Savoia	20	(2)
2015–2018	Pisa	35	(0)
2017	→ Messina (loan)	15	(0)
2018	Akragas	13	(0)
2018	Pro Piacenza	12	(1)
2019	Trento	5	(0)
2019	Latina	12	(0)
2020	Campobasso	4	(0)
2020–2021	Foligno	29	(2)
2021–2023	Villa Valle	50	(7)
2023–2024	Akragas	26	(0)
2024–2025	Paternò	8	(0)
2025	ASD Regina Mundi		
2025–	ASD Partinico Audace		

International career
2011–2012	Italy U18	8	(0)
2012–2013	Italy U19	4	(0)
2013	Italy U21 B	1	(0)
- * Club domestic league appearances and goals as of 10 October 2026

Giulio Sanseverino (born 10 February 1994) is an Italian professional footballer who plays as a midfielder for ASD Partinico Audace.

== Club career ==
Sanseverino is a youth product of Palermo, and was promoted to the first team in the summer of 2012 after being called up by head coach Giuseppe Sannino to join the senior team pre-season camp. He stayed in the first team also under new head coach Gian Piero Gasperini, and made his professional Serie A debut on 6 January 2013, being featured as a starter in an away match against Parma. He was featured again on 12 May 2013, playing the final 10 minutes of a game against Fiorentina as a replacement to Alejandro Faurlín.

After the team's relegation to Serie B, Sanseverino was permanently included in the first team squad for the 2013–2014 season. He made his league debut on 8 September 2013, playing the entirety of the game in a 3–0 win against Padova under new head coach Gennaro Gattuso. On 31 January 2014 Sanseverino left Palermo to go to Perugia on loan until June 2014. His Lega Pro Prima Divisione debut is against Barletta on 9 March 2014, playing the entirety of the game in a 3–0 win.

During the 2013–14 season he won the Lega Pro Prima Divisione with Perugia (eight first team appearances from January until June 2014). During the same season, he also won the Supercoppa di Lega di Prima Divisione with Perugia, playing in both the final matches.

On 27 July 2014, Lega Pro club Savoia announced the permanent signing of Sanseverino from Palermo. During the 2014–2015 season, Sanseverino played in 20 matches, scoring 2 goals and providing 3 assists for his team-mates. Despite his good performance, at the end of the season Savoia was relegated in Serie D and after 30 June 2015 Sanseverino was able to freely transfer to another team.

On 28 August 2015 Sanseverino joined Lega Pro club Pisa, where he found his former coach Gennaro Gattuso, signing a two-year contract. On 12 June 2016 Sanseverino was promoted in Serie B, contributing to the success of Pisa with 20 appearances in Lega Pro. Sanseverino kept playing for Pisa until January 2017, when he moved to Lega Pro club Messina for a 6-month loan. Sanseverino actively contributed to the permanence of Messina in Lega Pro with 15 appearances.

In June 2017 he moved back to Pisa, which was contemporaneously relegated to Lega Pro. After six months in which he did not collect presences, Sanseverino terminated his contract with Pisa and moved to Akragas in Serie C. During 2018 he collected 13 appearances for Akragas, which was relegated to Serie D at the end of the regular season.

In July 2018 he signed a contract with Pro Piacenza that will play in Serie C during the 2018–19 season. Pro Piacenza experienced financial differences in late 2018 and Sanseverino left the club.

On 28 February 2019, he signed with Trento in Serie D. After 5 matches and a relegation to Eccellenza, on 22 July 2019 he moved to Latina in Serie D. Latina confirmed on 13 December 2019, that Sanseverino's contract had been terminated. On 8 January 2020, he then joined fellow Serie D club Campobasso.

== International career ==
Sanseverino has played for the Italy U18 youth selections and for the Italy U19 squad.

In June 2013 he disputed the XVII Mediterranean Games with Italy's U19, along with teammates Mauro Bollino, Davide Monteleone and Andrea Fulignati.

== Honours ==
=== Club ===
Palermo

- Serie B: 2013–2014

Perugia

- Lega Pro Prima Divisione: 2013–2014
- Supercoppa di Lega di Prima Divisione: 2013–2014
