= Gabriele Zerbo =

Italian footballer

Personal information
- Date of birth: 16 May 1994 (age 32)
- Place of birth: Palermo, Italy
- Height: 1.78 m (5 ft 10 in)
- Position: Forward

Team information
- Current team: Messina

Youth career
- Palermo
- 2012: → Teramo (loan)
- 2012–2013: → Chievo (loan)

Senior career*
Years	Team	Apps	(Gls)
2010–2014	Palermo	0	(0)
2013–2014	→ Pergolettese (loan)	14	(1)
2014	→ FeralpiSalò (loan)	6	(2)
2014–2016	FeralpiSalò	25	(0)
2016	Concordia Chiajna	3	(0)
2016–2017	Paganese	18	(2)
2017–2018	Francavilla	21	(3)
2018–2020	Fermana	37	(1)
2019–2020	→ Carpi (loan)	0	(0)
2020–2021	Foligno	26	(10)
2021	Derthona	11	(5)
2021	Team Altamura	15	(1)
2021–2022	Montegiorgio	19	(3)
2022–2024	Sancataldese	64	(15)
2024–2025	Sambiase	30	(10)
2025–2026	Afragolese	13	(4)
2026–	Messina	3	(0)

International career^{‡}
2011	Italy U17	2	(0)
- * Club domestic league appearances and goals ‡ National team caps and goals as of 25 January 2026

Gabriele Zerbo (born 16 May 1994) is an Italian footballer who plays as a forward for Serie D club Messina.

== Club career ==
=== Palermo ===
Born in Palermo, capital of Sicily, Italy, Zerbo is a youth product of U.S. Città di Palermo, one of the Serie A clubs on the island at that time. Zerbo spent the 2008–09 season in the national junior league (Italian: Campionato Nazionale Giovanissimi Professionisti) with Palermo's under-15 team. He was a member of the Palermo under-17 team in the Italian: Campionato Nazionale Allievi Professionisti (National Student League for professional clubs) during the 2009–10 and 2010–11 seasons.

Zerbo made his professional debut on 15 December 2010 against Lausanne, despite he was the last minute substitute for Massimo Maccarone.

Zerbo also played for the reserve team since 2010, which he became a full member in 2011–12 season. Zerbo scored 8 times for the reserve team before he left the club in mid-2012.

On 9 July 2012 Zerbo was farmed to Teramo in co-ownership deal for a peppercorn fee of €500. However, in mutual consent with Palermo, Chievo acquired half of the registration rights from Teramo also for a peppercorn on 31 August. Zerbo did not play any competitive match for Teramo before he left the club. He played once in a friendly match however, as a sub of Righini.

On 26 January 2013, Palermo bought back Zerbo as well as bought Stefano Sorrentino from Chievo for a total of €4 million in 2 1/2-year contract and 3 1/2-year contract respectively. Zerbo spent the entire 2012–13 season with the reserve of Chievo and Palermo.

=== Lega Pro loans ===
On 15 July 2013 Zerbo and Stefano Cerniglia were signed by Pergolettese of the fourth division. They also signed a new 3-year young professional contract with Palermo. Zerbo started his fully professional season in the first two games of Lega Pro cup. Zerbo made his league debut in the second round of 2013–14 season as a substitute. On 1 February, Zerbo was signed by FeralpiSalò of the third division.

=== FeralpiSalò ===
FeralpiSalò signed Zerbo outright on 11 July 2014 in 2-year contract.

=== Fermana ===
In June 2018, after just one year with Francavilla, he signed for Serie C club Fermana for an undisclosed fee.

==== Loan to Carpi ====
On 2 September 2019, he joined Carpi on loan for the 2019–20 season. He returned from loan on 15 January 2020 after only appearing on Carpi's bench twice.

=== Serie D ===
On 10 August 2020 he joined Foligno on a one-year deal.

== International career ==
In February 2011 Zerbo played twice for the Italy national under-17 football team against Ireland in friendlies. He missed a penalty in the second match.
