= Umberto Nappello =

Italian footballer

Personal information
- Date of birth: 9 March 1991 (age 35)
- Place of birth: Naples, Italy
- Height: 1.76 m (5 ft 9 in)
- Position: Midfielder

Team information
- Current team: La Fiorita
- Number: 10

Senior career*
Years	Team	Apps	(Gls)
2008–2010	Potenza	14	(0)
2010–2011	Palermo	0	(0)
2011–2012	Monza	17	(0)
2012–2013	Gubbio	8	(0)
2013–2014	Forlì	23	(2)
2014–2015	Melfi	12	(0)
2015–2016	Grosseto	19	(8)
2016–2017	Savona	28	(3)
2017–2018	San Marino	30	(8)
2018–2019	Clodiense	27	(7)
2019–2020	Picerno	27	(2)
2020–2021	Clodiense	34	(5)
2021–2022	Delta PT	29	(11)
2022	Breno	13	(1)
2022–2023	Fano	19	(2)
2023–2025	Ravenna	34	(8)
2025–	La Fiorita	21	(2)
- * Club domestic league appearances and goals as of 25 June 2026

Umberto Nappello (born 9 March 1991) is an Italian footballer who plays as midfielder for La Fiorita.
