= Mauricio Sperduti =

Argentine footballer

Personal information
- Full name: Mauricio Ezequiel Sperduti
- Date of birth: February 16, 1986 (age 40)
- Place of birth: Rosario, Argentina
- Height: 1.79 m (5 ft 10 in)
- Position: Right winger

Team information
- Current team: Oriente Petrolero
- Number: 14

Youth career
- 1998–2006: Newell's Old Boys

Senior career*
| Years | Team | Apps | (Gls) |
| 2006–2013 | Newell's Old Boys | 138 | (15) |
| 2013 | Palermo | 0 | (0) |
| 2013–2014 | Arsenal de Sarandí | 37 | (2) |
| 2014–2015 | Cerro Porteño | 19 | (1) |
| 2015–2016 | Colón | 27 | (6) |
| 2016–2018 | Banfield | 49 | (5) |
| 2018 | Patronato | 15 | (4) |
| 2019– | Oriente Petrolero | 28 | (7) |

International career
| 2011– | Argentina | 2 | (0) |
- * Club domestic league appearances and goals as of 9 december 2019

Mauricio Ezequiel Sperduti (born 16 February 1986, in Rosario, Santa Fe) is an Argentine footballer who plays as a right winger for Oriente Petrolero.

== Club career ==
Nicknamed El Gordo, his debuted in the Argentine Primera División was in 2006 against Gimnasia y Esgrima La Plata.

On January 30, 2013, moved to Serie A club Palermo, signing a contract until 2016. In the Sicilian club finds Mauro Formica, former teammate Newell's Old Boys.

== Career statistics ==
| Club | Season | League | | International * | | Total | |
| Club | Season | Apps | Goals | Apps | Goals | Apps | Goals |
|---|---|---|---|---|---|---|---|
| Newell's Old boys Argentina | 2006–07 | 2 | 0 | 0 | 0 | 2 | 0 |
| Newell's Old boys Argentina | 2007–08 | 9 | 0 | 0 | 0 | 9 | 0 |
| Newell's Old boys Argentina | 2008–09 | 31 | 2 | 0 | 0 | 31 | 2 |
| Newell's Old boys Argentina | 2009–10 | 20 | 2 | 1 | 0 | 21 | 2 |
| Newell's Old boys Argentina | 2010–11 | 35 | 8 | 6 | 0 | 41 | 8 |
| Newell's Old boys Argentina | 2011–12 | 30 | 2 | 0 | 0 | 30 | 2 |
| Newell's Old boys Argentina | 2012–13 | 11 | 1 | 0 | 0 | 11 | 1 |
| Newell's Old boys Argentina | Total | 138 | 15 | 7 | 0 | 145 | 15 |

- (*) Includes Copa Libertadores and Copa Sudamericana.

== International career ==
He made his international debut March 16, 2011, against Venezuela in a 4–1 victory. The second appearance comes on 20 April in a 2–2 draw against Ecuador.
