= Francesco Vassallo (footballer) =

Italian footballer

Personal information
- Date of birth: 30 December 1993 (age 32)
- Place of birth: Palermo, Italy
- Height: 1.72 m (5 ft 8 in)
- Position: Midfielder

Team information
- Current team: Renate
- Number: 25

Youth career
- Palermo

Senior career*
Years	Team	Apps	(Gls)
2012–2014	Palermo	0	(0)
2012–2013	→ Foligno (loan)	31	(3)
2013–2014	→ Südtirol (loan)	32	(3)
2014–2016	Pistoiese	65	(5)
2016–2020	Siena	115	(7)
2020–2024	Monopoli	110	(1)
2024–	Renate	72	(3)

International career^{‡}
2011–2012	Italy U19	6	(1)
2012–2013	Italy U20	11	(2)
- * Club domestic league appearances and goals as of 29 April 2026 ‡ National team caps and goals as of 9 February 2017

Francesco Vassallo (born 30 December 1993) is an Italian footballer who plays as a midfielder for Serie C Group A club Renate.

== Biography ==
Vassallo started his career at Palermo. In June 2012 Vassallo graduated from the reserve team and left for the fourth tier club Foligno in co-ownership deals along with Andrea Adamo for a peppercorn of €500 each. Vassallo made his professional debut in Italian Lega Pro cup. On 31 August 2012 Adamo was sold outright for €14,667 in exchange with the 50% rights of Vassallo for €500. However Vassallo also returned to Foligno in a temporary deal for €1,000 with a new pre-set price. Palermo also subsidized Foligno €14,667 as performance bonus (Italian: premi di valorizzazione). Thus, Foligno got Adamo for a peppercorn of €1,000 net as a rewards to sell first team place to inexperienced Vassallo.

On 11 July 2013 he moved on loan to the third tier club Südtirol, located in the autonomous province of the same name. Vassallo was the starting midfielder in the cup as well as in the league, despite he was a sub for Branca in the first round.

On 9 July 2014 he was signed by Pistoiese.

On 31 August 2016 he was sold to fellow Lega Pro club Siena in a 2-year contract.

On 29 September 2020 he signed a two-year contract with Monopoli.

=== International career ===
Vassallo had played for the Italy U19 and Italy U20 youth selections.
