= Mauro Bollino =

Italian footballer

Personal information
- Date of birth: 31 December 1994 (age 31)
- Place of birth: Palermo, Italy
- Height: 1.71 m (5 ft 7 in)
- Position: Winger

Team information
- Current team: Gela

Youth career
- –2014: Palermo

Senior career*
Years	Team	Apps	(Gls)
2013–2014	→ Pisa (loan)	15	(1)
2014–2016	Foggia	17	(0)
2016	Fidelis Andria	17	(1)
2016–2017	Taranto	19	(3)
2017	→ Paganese (loan)	13	(2)
2017–2018	Sicula Leonzio	32	(10)
2018–2019	Bari	10	(1)
2019–2020	Sicula Leonzio	7	(1)
2020	Bitonto	4	(0)
2020–2021	ACR Messina	33	(10)
2021	Audace Cerignola	2	(0)
2021–2022	Lamezia Terme	26	(11)
2022–2023	Casertana	32	(9)
2023–2024	Trapani	25	(5)
2024	Nissa	10	(2)
2024–2025	Nocerina	9	(1)
2025–	Gela	13	(0)

International career^{‡}
2012	Italy U18	1	(0)
2012–2013	Italy U19	7	(1)
- * Club domestic league appearances and goals as of 18 January 2026 ‡ National team caps and goals as of 26 June 2013

Mauro Bollino (born 31 December 1994) is an Italian professional footballer who plays as a winger for Serie D club Gela.

== Club career ==
On 1 August 2021, he joined Audace Cerignola in Serie D. On 14 October 2021, his contract was terminated by mutual consent for family reasons. On the same day, he signed with Lamezia Terme, also in Serie D. In July 2022, he signed for Serie D club Casertana.
