= Nélson Marcos =

Portuguese footballer

Nélson
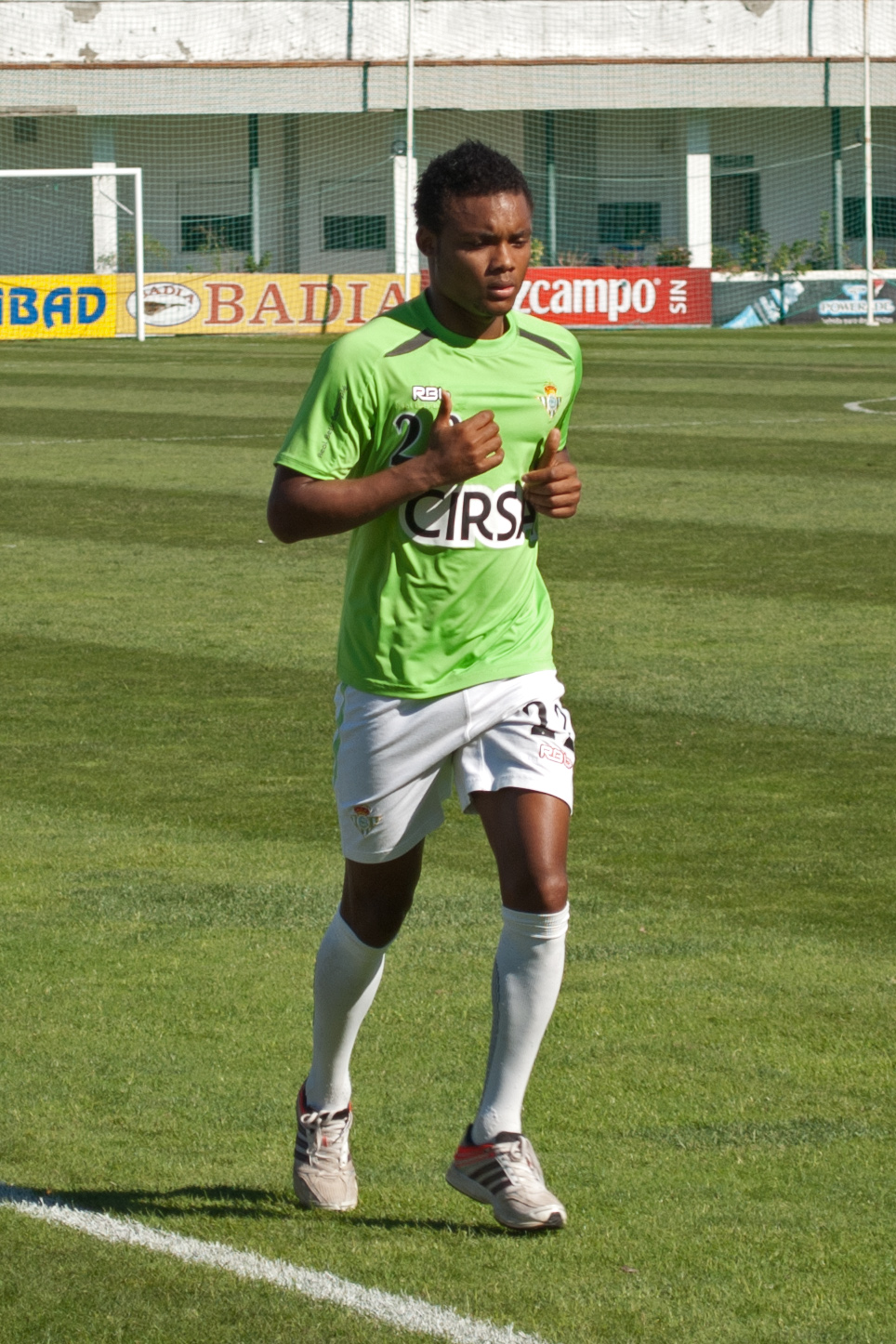
- Nélson training with Betis in 2011

Personal information
- Full name: Nélson Augusto Tomar Marcos
- Date of birth: 10 June 1983 (age 43)
- Place of birth: Sal, Cape Verde
- Height: 1.72 m (5 ft 7 1/2 in)
- Position: Right-back

Youth career
- Batuque
- 2000–2002: Vilanovense

Senior career*
Years	Team	Apps	(Gls)
2001–2003	Vilanovense	32	(0)
2003–2004	Salgueiros	27	(2)
2004–2005	Boavista	23	(1)
2005–2008	Benfica	72	(0)
2008–2013	Betis	81	(1)
2010–2011	→ Osasuna (loan)	29	(1)
2013–2014	Palermo	8	(1)
2013–2014	→ Almería (loan)	14	(0)
2014–2015	Belenenses	27	(0)
2015–2017	Alcorcón	55	(0)
2017–2018	AEK Larnaca	27	(0)
Total		395	(6)

International career
2006	Portugal U21	3	(0)
2009–2012	Portugal	4	(0)
- * Club domestic league appearances and goals

Nélson Augusto Tomar Marcos (born 10 June 1983), known simply as Nélson, is a former professional footballer who played as a right-back.

After making a name for himself at Benfica, appearing in 101 official games over three seasons, he went on to spend the vast majority of his career in Spain, representing Betis, Osasuna, Almería and Alcorcón. He also played in Italy and Cyprus.

Born in Cape Verde, Nélson won four caps for the Portugal national team in three years.

== Club career ==
=== Early years ===
Born in Sal, Cape Verde, Nélson started his professional career with Vilanovense. He began making a name in the Primeira Liga with Boavista, having joined from soon-to-be-extinct Salgueiros also in Porto.

In May 2005, Nélson was involved in a car crash along with former Boavista player José Bosingwa, who represented Porto at the time. The latter, behind the wheel of his jeep at the time of the accident, was travelling too quickly and due to wet conditions he crashed the car into an embankment which was followed by the car bursting into flames; one passenger required his foot to be amputated, whilst the other three were unharmed.

=== Benfica ===
Nélson signed a five-year contract with Benfica in summer 2005, for €1.5 million. He made the right-back spot his own upon his arrival, making 25 appearances during his first season; in the 2006–07 campaign, he was also a starter.

In the 2006–07 UEFA Champions League, after having faced Manchester United in the same competition and stage the season before, Nélson scored with a long-range shot into Edwin van der Sar's top-right hand corner at Old Trafford on 6 December 2006; eventually, the game was lost 3–1 and his team had to settle for a place in the UEFA Cup after finishing third.

=== Betis ===
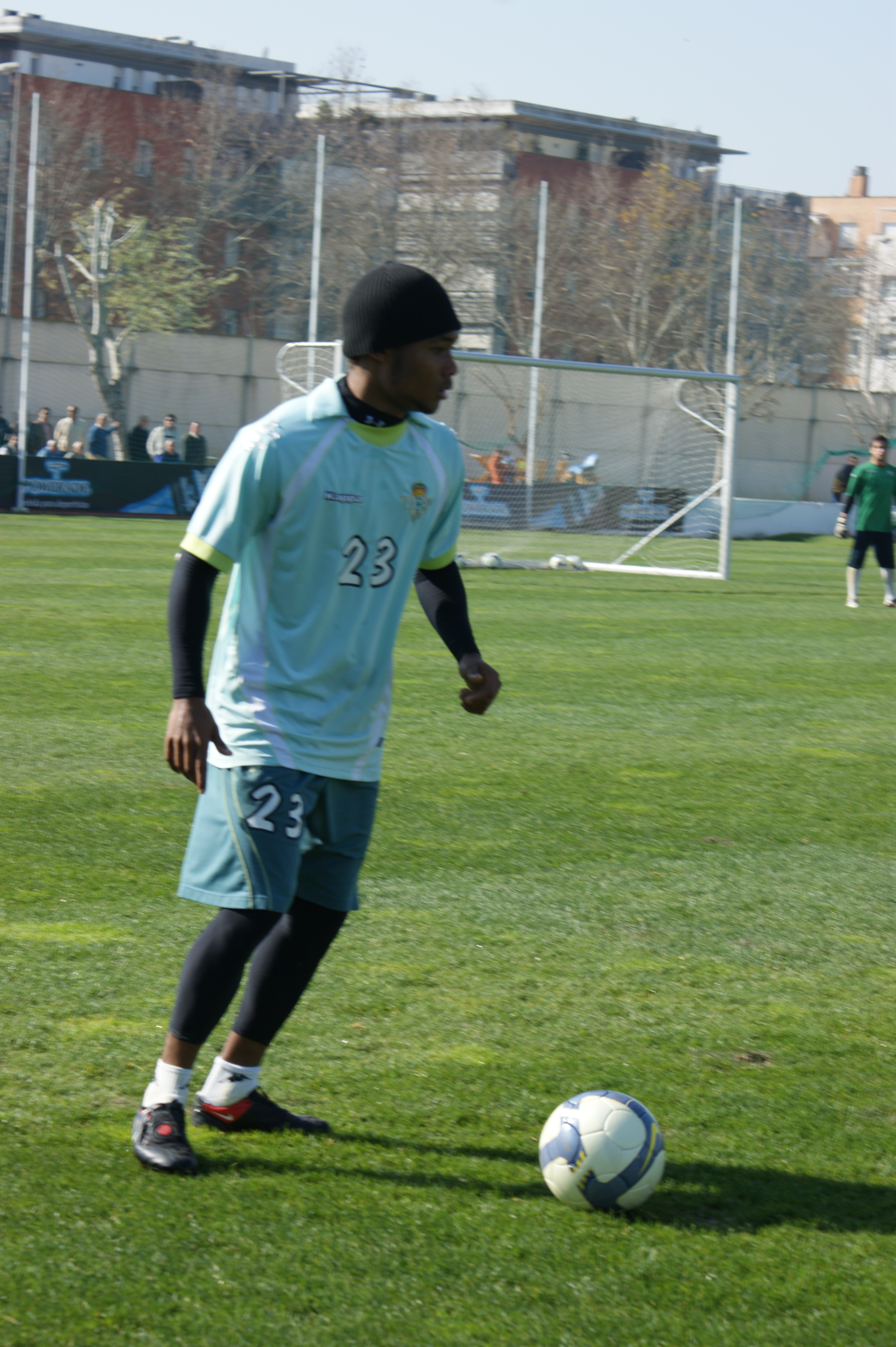
Nélson with Betis in 2009.

In late August 2008, Nélson joined Real Betis in Spain for €6 million, on a five-year deal. He quickly became a starter, as the Andalusian club was eventually relegated.

On 30 August 2010, Nélson was loaned to Osasuna, with the Navarrese having an option to make the move permanent at the season's end. Battling with Damià for first-choice status throughout the vast majority of the campaign, he netted on 20 December in a 4–0 away victory over Hércules, his first goal in over four years.

On 11 May 2011, in the last minute of the first half of a La Liga home fixture against Sevilla (3–2 home win), Nélson collided with opponent Lautaro Acosta, fracturing his left ankle in the outcome. His injury was not as serious as initially expected though.

Nélson spent the first part of 2011–12, with Betis again in the top division, recovering from his condition. On 4 December 2011, in one of his first bench appearances, he was caught on camera talking to his previous side Osasuna's assistant manager Alfredo, leading to rumours that he was filtering his team's lineup to the opposition, which was denied by both parties.

On 11 February 2012, in his first match for the Verdiblancos upon his return, Nélson scored from long distance in the 90th minute of a 2–1 home defeat of Athletic Bilbao.

=== Palermo ===
On 28 January 2013, days after being released by Betis, Nélson moved to Italy's Palermo, agreeing to a contract until June 2015 and rejoining his former Benfica teammate Fabrizio Miccoli. He scored on his Serie A debut the following week, but his late backheel goal could not help prevent a 1–2 home loss to Atalanta.

Nélson returned to Spain and its top flight on 2 August 2013, signing with Almería in a season-long loan deal. He subsequently returned to Palermo, but was immediately deemed surplus to requirements and was not even called up for pre-season camp; his link was terminated by mutual consent in August 2014.

=== Later career ===
In September 2014, the free agent Nélson joined Belenenses. He made his competitive debut on 13 September, featuring as a right midfielder and playing 78 minutes of the 1–1 away draw against Sporting CP.

Nélson returned to Spain on 29 July 2015, signing a one-year deal with Alcorcón. He retired aged 35, his last club having been Cypriot First Division's AEK Larnaca.

== International career ==
Nélson was granted Portuguese citizenship in December 2005, and played in the 2006 UEFA European Under-21 Championship. He received his first call-up to the senior team in the UEFA Euro 2008 qualifier against Kazakhstan on 15 November 2006, but did not leave the bench.

Nélson finally made his full debut on 31 March 2009, appearing in a 2–0 friendly win with South Africa in Lausanne, Switzerland.

== Career statistics ==
Club	Season	League			Cup		Other		Total	
Club	Season	Division	Apps	Goals	Apps	Goals	Apps	Goals	Apps	Goals
Vilanovense	2000–01	Segunda Divisão	5	0	0	0	—		5	0
Vilanovense	2001–02	Segunda Divisão	27	0	1	0	—		28	0
Vilanovense	Total		32	0	1	0	—		33	0
Salgueiros	2003–04	Segunda Liga	27	2	3	0	—		30	2
Boavista	2004–05	Primeira Liga	23	1	2	0	—		25	1
Benfica	2005–06	Primeira Liga	25	0	2	0	7 (Note: Appearances in UEFA Champions League)	0	34	0
Benfica	2006–07	Primeira Liga	28	0	3	0	6	1	37	1
Benfica	2007–08	Primeira Liga	19	0	5	0	6 (Note: Appearances in UEFA Champions League and UEFA Cup)	0	30	0
Benfica	Total		72	0	10	0	19	1	101	1
Betis	2008–09	La Liga	35	0	1	0	—		36	0
Betis	2009–10	Segunda División	22	0	1	0	—		23	0
Betis	2011–12	La Liga	14	1	1	0	—		15	1
Betis	2012–13	La Liga	10	0	0	0	—		10	0
Betis	Total		81	1	3	0	—		84	1
Osasuna (loan)	2010–11	La Liga	29	1	2	0	—		31	2
Palermo	2012–13	Serie A	8	1	0	0	—		8	1
Almería (loan)	2013–14	La Liga	14	0	1	0	—		15	0
Belenenses	2014–15	Primeira Liga	27	0	6	0	—		33	0
Alcorcón	2015–16	Segunda División	36	0	0	0	—		36	0
Alcorcón	2016–17	Segunda División	19	0	7	0	—		26	0
Alcorcón	Total		55	0	7	0	—		62	0
AEK Larnaca	2017–18	Cypriot First Division	27	0	5	0	0	0	32	0
Career total			395	6	40	0	19	1	454	7

== Honours ==
AEK Larnaca

- Cypriot Cup: 2017–18
