= Ezequiel Muñoz =

Argentine footballer

Personal information
- Full name: Ezequiel Matías Muñoz
- Date of birth: 8 October 1990 (age 36)
- Place of birth: Pergamino, Argentina
- Height: 1.85 m (6 ft 1 in)
- Position: Centre-back

Team information
- Current team: Gimnasia Mendoza
- Number: 4

Youth career
- 2004–2007: Boca Juniors

Senior career*
Years	Team	Apps	(Gls)
2008–2010	Boca Juniors	17	(1)
2010–2015	Palermo	141	(7)
2015	→ Sampdoria (loan)	4	(0)
2015–2017	Genoa	49	(1)
2017–2019	Leganés	23	(1)
2019–2020	Lanús	29	(1)
2020–2022	Independiente	0	(0)
2022–2024	Estudiantes	19	(0)
2024–2026	Lanús	49	(2)
2026–	Gimnasia Mendoza	13	(2)

International career
2007	Argentina U17		
2009	Argentina U20		
- * Club domestic league appearances and goals as of 16:33, 10 May 2026 (UTC)

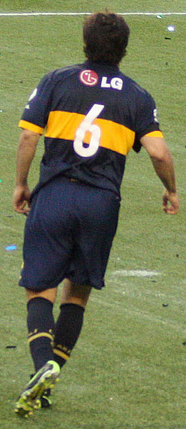

Ezequiel Matías Muñoz (born 8 October 1990) is an Argentine professional footballer who plays as a centre-back for Argentine club Gimnasia Mendoza. His nickname is Il niño di Pergamino or El Chiquito.

== Club career ==
At 18 years of age, Muñoz made his league debut with Boca Juniors during a 1–0 defeat to Estudiantes de La Plata during the 2009 Clausura tournament. He had, however, previously played with the team during the 2008 Copa Sudamericana. Subsequently, he suffered a cruciate ligament injury to his knee, which stalled his progression in the team. He returned to the field during the 2010 Clausura, during a 2–2 draw with Argentinos Juniors.

In August 2010, Serie A club Palermo announced the signing of Ezequiel Muñoz from Boca Juniors. He made his debut with the Sicilian club on 26 August 2010, when he was picked as a starter in the return leg of the 2010–11 UEFA Europa League play-off round against NK Maribor. He debuted in Serie A on 29 August 2010 against Cagliari.

On 2 February 2015, Sampdoria confirmed that they had taken Muñoz on loan. After only four matches, on 18 July 2015 he signed a four-year contract as a free agent for Genoa.

On 8 August 2017, Muñoz switched teams and countries again, signing a three-year deal with La Liga side CD Leganés, for a rumoured fee of € 2 million. Ten days later he made his debut for the club, starting in a 1–0 home win against Deportivo Alavés.

On 12 June 2019, Munoz signed with Argentine side Lanús.

On 26 September, Munoz signed with Argentine side Independiente.

On 14 January 2022, he signs a contract with Estudiantes de La Plata.

== International career ==
In 2009, Muñoz was called by the Argentina national team coach Diego Maradona for a friendly match against Panama in a squad exclusively formed with footballers based on the Argentine league. Nonetheless, he had to be left out after suffering the cruciate ligament injury to his knee.

== Career statistics ==
As of 24 August 2018

Appearances and goals by club, season and competition
Club	Season	League			Cup		Continental		Total	
Club	Season	Division	Apps	Goals	Apps	Goals	Apps	Goals	Apps	Goals
Boca Juniors	2008–09	Argentine Primera División	2	0	0	0	5	0	7	0
Boca Juniors	2009–10	Argentine Primera División	15	1	0	0	1	0	16	1
Boca Juniors	Total		17	1	0	0	6	0	23	1
Palermo	2010–11	Serie A	34	0	4	1	4	1	42	2
Palermo	2011–12	Serie A	19	1	0	0	2	0	21	1
Palermo	2012–13	Serie A	32	0	0	0	0	0	32	0
Palermo	2013–14	Serie B	33	3	0	0	0	0	33	3
Palermo	2014–15	Serie A	13	1	1	0	0	0	14	1
Palermo	Total		131	5	5	1	6	1	142	7
Sampdoria (loan)	2014–15	Serie A	4	0	0	0	0	0	4	0
Genoa	2015–16	Serie A	18	0	0	0	0	0	18	0
Genoa	2016–17	Serie A	31	1	1	0	0	0	32	1
Genoa	Total		49	1	1	0	0	0	50	1
Leganés	2017–18	La Liga	18	1	2	0	0	0	20	1
Leganés	2018–19	La Liga	3	0	0	0	0	0	3	0
Leganés	Total		21	1	2	0	0	0	23	1
Career total			222	8	8	1	12	1	242	10

== Honours ==
Lanús

- Copa Sudamericana: 2025
