= Santiago García (Argentine footballer) =

Argentine footballer (born 1988)

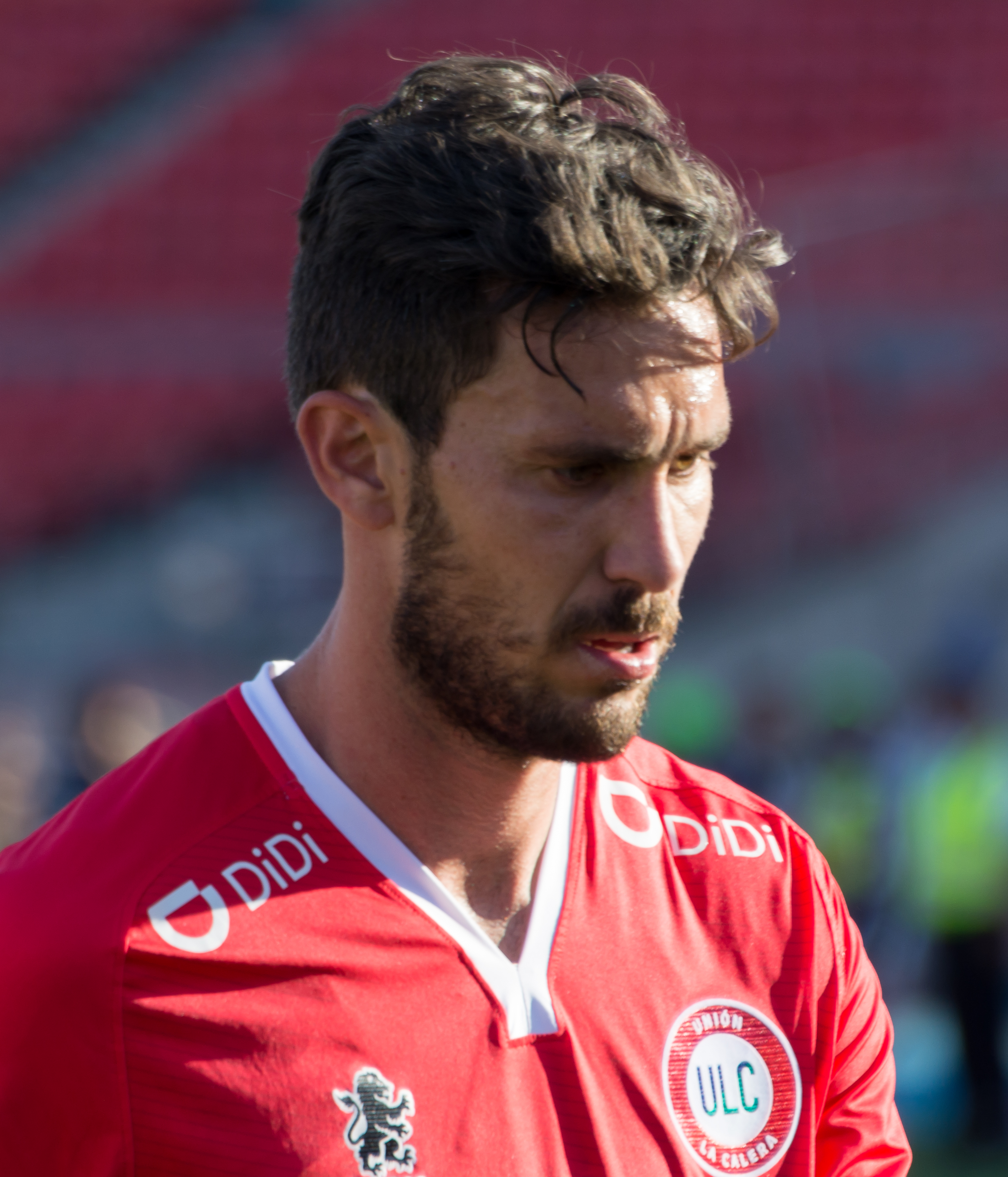
- García with Unión La Calera in 2020

Personal information
- Date of birth: 8 July 1988 (age 38)
- Place of birth: Rosario, Argentina
- Height: 1.91 m (6 ft 3 in)
- Position: Left-back

Youth career
- Rosario Central

Senior career*
Years	Team	Apps	(Gls)
2008–2010	Rosario Central	16	(0)
2010–2013	Palermo	35	(1)
2011–2012	→ Novara (loan)	21	(1)
2013–2014	Rangers de Talca	0	(0)
2013–2014	→ Werder Bremen (loan)	22	(3)
2014–2017	Werder Bremen	72	(1)
2014	Werder Bremen II	1	(0)
2017–2019	Toluca	58	(2)
2020–2022	Unión La Calera	40	(0)
2023	Alianza Lima	20	(1)
- * Club domestic league appearances and goals as of 23:43, 11 September 2024 (UTC)

Santiago García (born 8 July 1988) is an Argentine professional footballer who most recently played as a left-back for Club Alianza Lima.

== Career ==
=== Rosario Central ===
García started his career at hometown club Rosario Central, playing his first game with the team on a 1–0 defeat to Gimnasia y Esgrima La Plata during the 2008 Apertura tournament. He broke into the starting eleven during the 2010 Clausura tournament under the guidance of head coach Ariel Cuffaro Russo, relegating Ecuadorian international Paúl Ambrosi to the bench. García made a total 13 positive appearances which led to interest from a number of European clubs.

=== Palermo and loan to Novara ===
On 12 July 2010, Palermo chairman and owner Maurizio Zamparini confirmed the signing of the Argentine defender from Rosario Central. He debuted with the rosanero on 30 September against Lausanne in the UEFA Europa League.

On 19 July 2011, newly promoted Serie A club Novara confirmed on its website to have signed García on loan from Palermo, with an option to acquire half of the player's rights by the end of the season. He scored his first goal in the Serie A on 13 May 2012 against Milan.

In the 2012–13 season, he returned to Palermo to replace Federico Balzaretti, who moved to Roma. In his second full season at the rosanero, he suffered relegation to Serie B and was often criticized by the team supporters due to the alleged poor quality of his performances.

In July 2013, García did not answer to the pre-season call-up from Palermo, his agent stating his intention not to play for the Sicilians anymore.

=== Werder Bremen ===
On 1 September 2013, Palermo announced to have loaned García to Werder Bremen with an option to sign him permanently. In October 2013, Werder Bremen expressed their interest in turning the loan into a permanent deal.

In May 2017, Werder Bremen announced that García would leave the club at the end of the season after they had failed to agree a contract extension. In his four years at the club, he made a total of 99 appearances across all competitions, scoring 5 goals and contributing 10 assists.

=== Toluca ===
In June 2017, García joined Liga MX club Toluca.

=== Alianza Lima ===
In December 2022 it was announced that García would join Club Alianza Lima for the 2023 season, having trialled with the club in pre-season.

== Personal life ==
García also holds Spanish citizenship. His twin brother, Manuel, is also a professional footballer.

== Career statistics ==
As of match played 28 April 2021

Appearances and goals by club, season and competition
Club	Season	League			Cup		Continental		Total	
Club	Season	Division	Apps	Goals	Apps	Goals	Apps	Goals	Apps	Goals
Rosario Central	2008–09	Primera División	1	0	0	0	0	0	1	0
Rosario Central	2009–10	Primera División	15	0	0	0	0	0	15	0
Rosario Central	Total		16	0	0	0	0	0	16	0
Palermo	2010–11	Serie A	3	0	1	0	3	0	7	0
Palermo	2012–13	Serie A	32	1	2	0	0	0	34	1
Palermo	Total		35	1	3	0	3	0	41	1
Novara	2011–12	Serie A	21	1	2	0	0	0	23	1
Werder Bremen (loan)	2013–14	Bundesliga	22	3	0	0	—		22	3
Werder Bremen	2014–15	Bundesliga	24	0	3	0	—		18	0
Werder Bremen	2015–16	Bundesliga	29	0	2	1	—		31	1
Werder Bremen	2016–17	Bundesliga	19	1	0	0	—		19	1
Werder Bremen	Total		72	1	5	1	0	0	77	2
Werder Bremen II	2015–16	3. Liga	1	0	—		—		1	0
Toluca	2017–18	Liga MX	35	1	6	0	—		41	1
Toluca	2018–19	Liga MX	23	1	2	0	—		25	1
Toluca	Total		58	2	8	0	0	0	66	2
Unión La Calera	2020	Chilean Primera División	27	0	0	0	5	0	32	0
Unión La Calera	2021	Chilean Primera División	5	0	0	0	2	0	7	0
Unión La Calera	Total		32	0	0	0	7	0	39	0
Career total			257	8	18	1	10	0	285	9
