= 2014–15 AC Milan season =

Milan
2014–15 season
- Chairman Honorary chairman: Vacant; Silvio Berlusconi
- Manager: Filippo Inzaghi
- Stadium: San Siro
- Serie A: 10th
- Coppa Italia: Quarter-finals
- Top goalscorer: League: Jérémy Ménez (16); All: Jérémy Ménez (16)
- Highest home attendance: 79,173 vs Internazionale, Serie A, 23 November 2014
- Lowest home attendance: 8,393 vs Sassuolo, Coppa Italia, 13 January 2015
- Average home league attendance: 36,661
Home colours	Away colours	Third colours

In the 2014–15 season, Associazione Calcio Milan competed in Serie A for the 81st time, as well as the Coppa Italia. It was the club's 32nd consecutive season in the top flight of Italian football.

This was Milan's first season since 1998–99 in which the club did not participate in any European competitions, having failed to qualify after finishing eighth in the 2013–14 league season. Filippo Inzaghi was appointed as the new coach of the team.

== Players ==

Starting line-up. For most of the season, Inzaghi opted for using a false nine rather than a proper central forward. After the January transfer session, however, Ménez was often moved to the wing and either Destro or Pazzini played as central striker. Mexès, Paletta, Muntari and Cerci have also been regularly appearing in a number of starting line-ups during the season.

=== Squad information ===
As of 2 February 2015.

Note: Flags indicate national team as defined under FIFA eligibility rules; some limited exceptions apply. Players may hold more than one non-FIFA nationality.

No.	Pos.	Nation	Player
1	GK	ITA	Michael Agazzi
2	DF	ITA	Mattia De Sciglio
4	MF	GHA	Sulley Muntari
5	DF	FRA	Philippe Mexès
7	FW	FRA	Jérémy Ménez
8	MF	ESP	Suso
9	FW	ITA	Mattia Destro
10	MF	JPN	Keisuke Honda
11	FW	ITA	Giampaolo Pazzini
13	DF	FRA	Adil Rami
14	DF	ITA	Michelangelo Albertazzi
15	MF	GHA	Michael Essien
16	MF	ITA	Andrea Poli
17	DF	COL	Cristián Zapata
18	MF	ITA	Riccardo Montolivo (captain)
19	DF	ITA	Salvatore Bocchetti

No.	Pos.	Nation	Player
20	DF	ITA	Ignazio Abate
21	MF	NED	Marco van Ginkel
22	FW	ITA	Alessio Cerci
23	GK	ESP	Diego López
25	DF	ITA	Daniele Bonera
28	MF	ITA	Giacomo Bonaventura
29	DF	ITA	Gabriel Paletta
31	DF	ITA	Luca Antonelli
32	GK	ITA	Christian Abbiati (vice-captain)
33	DF	BRA	Alex
34	MF	NED	Nigel de Jong
81	DF	ITA	Cristian Zaccardo
92	FW	ITA	Stephan El Shaarawy
98	FW	MAR	Hachim Mastour

== Transfers ==
=== Summer 2014 ===
Milan continued the trend from the previous season by signing free agents, including Michael Agazzi, Alex and Jérémy Ménez, that arrived in early summer. Major efforts, however, were made to confirm and/or fully acquire players already presents, but on loan or co-ownership (e.g. Andrea Poli, Riccardo Saponara, Michelangelo Albertazzi and Adil Rami), while only M'Baye Niang start the season after his return from previous loan. Pablo Armero, Fernando Torres and Marco van Ginkel also joined Milan on loan. In the last day of the transfer window, Milan bought Giacomo Bonaventura.

A few important players from the last season parted ways with Milan. Marco Amelia and Urby Emanuelson left after their contracts ended, Kaká activated the release clause in his contract, Adel Taarabt returned to Queens Park Rangers after his loan expired, while Kévin Constant, Mario Balotelli and Bryan Cristante were sold, allowing Milan to invest the incomed money in further acquisitions. The club also decided to sell Alberto Paloschi, Rodrigo Ely and Kingsley Boateng, instead of loaning them like in the past. Alessandro Matri, Antonio Nocerino, Valter Birsa and Robinho were supposed to be sold too, but they were eventually loaned out.

==== In ====
Date	Pos.	Player	Age	Moving from	Fee	Notes
13 May 2014	FW	(Italy) (Morocco) Hachim Mastour	15	(Italy) Milan Youth System	N/A	Promoted
22 May 2014	GK	(Italy) Michael Agazzi	29	(Italy) Chievo	Free	Effective From 1 July
5 June 2014	DF	(Brazil) Alex	31	(France) Paris Saint-Germain	Free	Effective From 1 July
9 June 2014	MF	(Italy) Andrea Poli	24	(Italy) Sampdoria	€2,500,000 + Salamon	Co-Ownership Solved
13 June 2014	GK	(Italy) Stefano Gori	17	(Italy) Brescia	€600,000	Co-Ownership Solved
14 June 2014	MF	(France) Jérémy Ménez	27	(France) Paris Saint-Germain	Free	Effective From 1 July
20 June 2014	MF	(Italy) Riccardo Saponara	22	(Italy) Parma	€1,000,000	Co-Ownership Solved
20 June 2014	DF	(Italy) Michelangelo Albertazzi	23	(Italy) Verona	€500,000	Co-Ownership Solved
20 June 2014	DF	(Italy) Davide Pacifico	20	(Italy) Novara	Undisclosed	Co-Ownership Solved
1 July 2014	FW	(France) M'Baye Niang	19	(France) Montpellier	N/A	Loan Return
12 July 2014	DF	(France) Adil Rami	28	(Spain) Valencia	€4,250,000	
12 August 2014	GK	(Spain) Diego López	32	(Spain) Real Madrid	Free	
12 August 2014	DF	(Colombia) Pablo Armero	27	(Italy) Udinese	€500,000	Loan
19 August 2014	FW	(Italy) Gianmario Comi	22	(Italy) Torino	N/A	Co-Ownership Solved
29 August 2014	FW	(Spain) Fernando Torres	30	(England) Chelsea	N/A	Loan
1 September 2014	MF	(Netherlands) Marco van Ginkel	21	(England) Chelsea	€500,000	Loan^{1}
1 September 2014	MF	(Italy) Giacomo Bonaventura	25	(Italy) Atalanta	€7,000,000	

Total expenditure: ▼€16.8 million

==== Out ====
Date	Pos.	Player	Age	Moving to	Fee	Notes
9 June 2014	DF	(Poland) Bartosz Salamon	23	(Italy) Sampdoria	N/A	Part of Poli Purchase
11 June 2014	MF	(Italy) Filippo Lora	20	(Italy) Cittadella	Undisclosed	Co-Ownership Solved
11 June 2014	GK	(Italy) Riccardo Piscitelli	20	(Italy) Benevento	€300,000	Co-Ownership Solved
13 June 2014	MF	(Italy) Luca Bertoni	20	(Italy) Carpi	N/A	Co-Ownership Solved
17 June 2014	GK	(Italy) Filippo Perucchini	22	(Italy) Lecce	€100,000	Co-Ownership Solved
19 June 2014	FW	(Italy) Alberto Paloschi	24	(Italy) Chievo	€3,500,000	Co-Ownership Solved
20 June 2014	MF	(Mali) Bakaye Traoré	29	(Turkey) Bursaspor	Free	
20 June 2014	MF	(Italy) Mattia Valoti	20	(Italy) AlbinoLeffe	Free	Co-Ownership Solved
20 June 2014	MF	(Italy) Lorenzo Saporetti	20	(Italy) Cesena	€27,000	Co-Ownership Solved
30 June 2014	MF	(Brazil) Kaká	32	(United States) Orlando City	Free	Activated Release Clause
1 July 2014	DF	(Argentina) Matías Silvestre	29	(Italy) Internazionale	N/A	Loan Return
1 July 2014	MF	(Morocco) Adel Taarabt	25	(England) QPR	N/A	Loan Return
1 July 2014	GK	(Italy) Marco Amelia	32	(Italy) Rocca Priora	N/A	Expired Contract
1 July 2014	MF	(Netherlands) Urby Emanuelson	28	(Italy) Roma	N/A	Expired Contract
1 July 2014	DF	(Switzerland) Mattia Desole	21	(Switzerland) Rapperswil-Jona	N/A	After return from loan
1 July 2014	FW	(Slovenia) Maks Barišič	20	(Italy) Catania	N/A	Loan return
7 July 2014	FW	(Italy) (Ghana) Kingsley Boateng	20	(Netherlands) NAC Breda	N/A	After return from loan
8 July 2014	GK	(Italy) Ferdinando Coppola	37	(Italy) Bologna	Undisclosed	
11 July 2014	DF	(Italy) Davide Pacifico	20	(Italy) Sudtirol	Undisclosed	
12 July 2014	GK	(Italy) Lorenzo Ferrari	18	(Italy) Verona	Undisclosed	
14 July 2014	MF	(Italy) Alex Pedone	20	(Italy) Carrarese	Undisclosed	
21 July 2014	DF	(Italy) (Brazil) Rodrigo Ely	20	(Italy) Avellino	Undisclosed	After return from loan
23 July 2014	FW	(Italy) Simone Andrea Ganz	20	(Italy) Como	Undisclosed	After return from loan
23 July 2014	FW	(Italy) Iacopo Cernigoi	19	(Italy) Pro Sesto	Undisclosed	
31 July 2014	MF	(Ivory Coast) Donald Bende Bende	18	(Hungary) Budapest Honvéd	Undisclosed	
5 August 2014	DF	(Guinea) Kévin Constant	27	(Turkey) Trabzonspor	€2,500,000	
8 August 2014	DF	(Italy) Luca Iotti	18	(Spain) Elche	N/A	Buy-back Clause
25 August 2014	FW	(Italy) Mario Balotelli	24	(England) Liverpool	€20,000,000	
1 September 2014	MF	(Italy) Bryan Cristante	19	(Portugal) Benfica	€6,000,000	

Total income: ▲€32,4 million

==== Loans out ====
Date	Pos.	Player	Age	Moving to	Fee	Notes
2 July 2014	MF	(Italy) Antonio Nocerino	29	(Italy) Torino	N/A	
2 July 2014	DF	(Italy) (Monaco) Johad Ferretti	20	(Italy) SPAL	N/A	After return from loan
2 July 2014	GK	(Italy) Edoardo Pazzagli	25	(Italy) Pistoiese	N/A	After return from loan
9 July 2014	MF	(Slovenia) Valter Birsa	27	(Italy) Chievo	N/A	
9 July 2014	DF	(Colombia) Jherson Vergara	20	(Italy) Avellino	N/A	After return from loan
12 July 2014	ST	(Italy) Alessandro Matri	29	(Italy) Genoa	N/A	After return from loan
14 July 2014	DF	(Brazil) Marcus Diniz	26	(Italy) Lecce	N/A	Loan confirmed
15 July 2014	FW	(Italy) Gianmario Comi	22	(Italy) Avellino	N/A	Co-Owned w. Torino at the time
15 July 2014	MF	(Italy) Marco Fossati	21	(Italy) Perugia	N/A	After return from loan
16 July 2014	MF	(Italy) Simone Verdi	21	(Italy) Empoli	N/A	Co-Own. w. Torino on 06 -18
16 July 2014	MF	(Italy) Andrea Petagna	19	(Italy) Latina	N/A	
16 July 2014	MF	(Ghana) Edmund Hottor	21	(Italy) Venezia	N/A	After return from loan
17 July 2014	MF	(Romania) Cristian Daminuță	24	(Romania) Viitorul Constanța	N/A	After return from loan
18 July 2014	MF	(Italy) Matteo Chinellato	22	(Italy) Südtirol	N/A	
26 July 2014	DF	(Italy) Cristian Galliani	18	(Italy) Varese	N/A	
26 July 2014	DF	(Hungary) Krisztián Tamás	19	(Italy) Varese	N/A	
4 August 2014	MF	(Slovenia) Žan Benedičič	18	(England) Leeds United	N/A	
6 August 2014	DF	(Czech Republic) Stefan Simić	18	(Italy) Varese	N/A	
7 August 2014	FW	(Brazil) Robinho	30	(Brazil) Santos	N/A	
8 August 2014	MF	(Nigeria) Nnamdi Oduamadi	23	(Italy) Crotone	N/A	After return from loan
13 August 2014	FW	(Italy) Gianmarco Zigoni	23	(Italy) Monza	N/A	After return from loan
20 August 2014	FW	(Italy) Giacomo Beretta	22	(Italy) Pro Vercelli	N/A	After return from loan
25 August 2014	DF	(Spain) Dídac Vilà	25	(Spain) Eibar	N/A	After return from loan
29 August 2014	MF	(Nigeria) Ezekiel Henty	21	(Slovenia) Gorica	N/A	After return from loan
1 September 2014	GK	(Brazil) Gabriel	21	(Italy) Carpi	N/A	
1 September 2014	MF	(Hungary) Attila Filkor	26	(Italy) Avellino	N/A	After return from loan
1 September 2014	MF	(Italy) (Argentina) Alessio Innocenti	21	(Slovenia) Gorica	N/A	
1 September 2014	MF	(Nigeria) Favour Aniekan	19	(Lithuania) Dainava Alytus	N/A	

=== Winter 2014–15 ===
25 December 2014 had yet to come when Milan announced its first winter transfer: a switch with Atlético Madrid by loaning them Fernando Torres and bringing Alessio Cerci to Italy. In the next few days, all details were settled, including the full acquisition of the Spanish player from Chelsea. Later in this transfer window, Milan also signed Suso, Salvatore Bocchetti, Mattia Destro, Luca Antonelli, and Gabriel Paletta. In April, Pablo Armero returned to Udinese.

==== In ====
Date	Pos.	Player	Age	Moving from	Fee	Notes
5 January 2015	FW	(Spain) Fernando Torres	30	(England) Chelsea	N/A	Free
5 January 2015	FW	(Italy) Alessio Cerci	27	(Spain) Atlético Madrid	N/A	18 Months Loan, Switch w. Torres
14 January 2015	FW	(Italy) (Ghana) Kingsley Boateng	20	(Netherlands) NAC Breda	N/A	Re-buy option
17 January 2015	MF	(Spain) Suso	21	(England) Liverpool	N/A	
28 January 2015	DF	(Italy) Salvatore Bocchetti	28	(Russia) Spartak Moscow	N/A	6 Months Loan
29 January 2015	FW	(Italy) Mattia Destro	23	(Italy) Roma	N/A	6 Months Loan
2 February 2015	DF	(Italy) Luca Antonelli	27	(Italy) Genoa	€4,000,000	
2 February 2015	DF	(Italy) (Argentina) Gabriel Paletta	28	(Italy) Parma	€880,000	

==== Out ====
Date	Pos.	Player	Age	Moving to	Fee	Notes
10 April 2015	DF	(Colombia) Pablo Armero	28	(Italy) Udinese	N/A	End of loan, will play for Flamengo

==== Loans out ====
Date	Pos.	Player	Age	Moving to	Fee	Notes
15 December 2014	DF	(Hungary) Krisztián Tamás	19	(Czech Republic) Slavia Prague	N/A	Effective from 1 January
24 December 2014	FW	(Spain) Fernando Torres	30	(Spain) Atlético Madrid	N/A	18 Months Loan, Switch w. Cerci
31 December 2014	FW	(Italy) Gianmarco Zigoni	23	(Italy) SPAL	N/A	After return from loan
10 January 2014	DF	(Italy) (Monaco) Johad Ferretti	19	(Italy) Matera	N/A	After return from loan
13 January 2014	FW	(Italy) Andrea Petagna	18	(Italy) Vicenza	N/A	After return from loan
14 January 2015	FW	(Italy) (Ghana) Kingsley Boateng	20	(Italy) Bari	N/A	After buy-back
15 January 2015	GK	(Italy) Edoardo Pazzagli	25	(Italy) Lucchese	N/A	After return from loan
15 January 2015	MF	(Italy) Antonio Nocerino	29	(Italy) Parma	N/A	After return from loan
16 January 2015	MF	(Italy) Riccardo Saponara	23	(Italy) Empoli	N/A	
21 January 2015	FW	(Nigeria) Nnamdi Oduamadi	24	(Italy) Latina	N/A	After return from loan
22 January 2015	FW	(France) M'Baye Niang	20	(Italy) Genoa	N/A	
31 January 2015	MF	(Nigeria) Favour Aniekan	20	(Slovenia) Krka	N/A	After return from loan
2 February 2015	FW	(Italy) Alessandro Matri	30	(Italy) Juventus	N/A	After return from loan
3 February 2015	FW	(Nigeria) Ezekiel Henty	21	(Slovenia) Olimpija Ljubljana	N/A	After return from loan

== Pre-season and friendlies ==
Milan returned to training at Milanello from 9 July. The Rossoneri started their season with a series of pre-season friendlies. In the summer, Milan took part in the International Champions Cup, played across the United States and Canada between 24 July and 4 August. It was the club's second presence in the tournament. On 23 August, Milan played against Juventus and Sassuolo in TIM Trophy, eventually winning the competition. On 5 November, Milan won Trofeo Luigi Berlusconi after defeating San Lorenzo, the winners of 2014 Copa Libertadores. Milan also won the 2014 Dubai Challenge Cup on 30 December following a 4–2 win over Real Madrid, the 2013–14 UEFA Champions League champions.

16 July 2014 Friendly	Renate	0–2	Milan	Solbiate Arno, Italy
		Report	El Shaarawy 24'; Saponara 55'	Stadium: Stadio Felice Chinetti

20 July 2014 Friendly	Monza	0–2	Milan	Monza, Italy
18:00 CEST (UTC+02:00)		Report	Niang 69' (pen.); Mastalli 75'	Stadium: Stadio Brianteo

24 July 2014 ICC	Olympiacos	3–0	Milan	Toronto, Ontario, Canada
20:00 EST	Domínguez 16'; Diamantakos 48'; Bouchalakis 78'	Report		Stadium: BMO Field; Referee: Silviu Petrescu

27 July 2014 ICC	Milan	1–5	Manchester City	Pittsburgh, Pennsylvania, United States
16:00 EST	Muntari 42'	Report	Jovetić 12', 58'; Sinclair 13'; Navas 23'; Iheanacho 26'	Stadium: Heinz Field

2 August 2014 ICC	Milan	0–2	Liverpool	Charlotte, North Carolina, United States
18:30 EST		Report	Allen 17'; Suso 90'	Stadium: Bank of America Stadium

6 August 2014 Friendly	Milan	3–0	Guadalajara	Houston, Texas, United States
	Niang 19'; Balotelli 37'; Pazzini 72'	Report		Stadium: NRG Stadium

4 August 2014 Friendly	Milan	5–1	Pro Piacenza	Milan, Italy
18:00 CEST	Muntari 5'; Honda 28'; Niang 46'; Pazzini 55'; El Shaarawy 57'	Report	Mella 47'	Stadium: San Siro

17 August 2014 Friendly	Valencia	2–1	Milan	Valencia, Spain
21:00 CEST (UTC+02:00)	Alcácer 18'; Rodrigo 36'	Report	Honda 28'	Stadium: Mestalla Stadium

23 August 2014 TIM Trophy	Milan	1–0	Juventus	Reggio Emilia, Italy
20:45 CEST	Honda 28'	Report		Stadium: Mapei Stadium – Città del Tricolore

23 August 2014 TIM Trophy	Milan	2–0	Sassuolo	Reggio Emilia, Italy
22:45 CEST	Ménez 7'; El Shaarawy 18'	Report		Stadium: Mapei Stadium – Città del Tricolore

5 November 2014 Trofeo Luigi Berlusconi	Milan	2–0	San Lorenzo	Milan, Italy
20:45 CEST	Pazzini 25'; Bonaventura 85'	Report		Stadium: San Siro

30 December 2014 Friendly	Milan	4–2	Real Madrid	Dubai, United Arab Emirates
20:00 UTC+03:00	Ménez 24'; El Shaarawy 31', 48'; Pazzini 73'		Ronaldo 35'; Benzema 84' (pen.)	Stadium: The Sevens Stadium; Attendance: 42,000; Referee: Muhammad Abdullah (United Arab Emirates)

25 March 2015 Friendly	Reggiana	0–3	Milan	Reggio Emilia, Italy
10:00 UTC+01:00			Suso 2', 44'; Ménez 77'	Stadium: Mapei Stadium

== Competitions ==
=== Overall ===
Competition	Started round	Current position / round	Final position / round	First match	Last match
Serie A	Matchday 1	—	10th	31 August 2014	30 May 2015
Coppa Italia	Round of 16	—	Quarter-finals	13 January 2015	27 January 2015

Updated to match played 30 May 2015.
Source: Competitions

=== Serie A ===
==== League table ====
Pos	Team	Pld	W	D	L	GF	GA	GD	Pts
8	Internazionale	38	14	13	11	59	48	+11	55
9	Torino	38	14	12	12	48	45	+3	54
10	Milan	38	13	13	12	56	50	+6	52
11	Palermo	38	12	13	13	53	55	−2	49 (Note: Palermo finished ahead of Sassuolo on head-to-head away goals scored: Palermo 2-1 Sassuolo, Sassuolo 0-0 Palermo.)
12	Sassuolo	38	12	13	13	49	57	−8	49

Source: 2014–15 Serie A, 2014-15 Serie A classification.
Rules for classification: 1) points; 2) head-to-head points; 3) head-to-head goal difference; 4) goal difference; 5) number of goals scored; 6) draw. (Head-to-head record is applied for clubs with the same number of points only once all matches between said clubs have been played.).

==== Results summary ====
Overall								Home						Away					
Pld	W	D	L	GF	GA	GD	Pts	W	D	L	GF	GA	GD	W	D	L	GF	GA	GD
38	13	13	12	56	50	+6	52	9	5	5	30	19	+11	4	8	7	26	31	−5

Last updated: 30 May 2015.
Source: Competitive matches

==== Results by round ====
Round	1	2	3	4	5	6	7	8	9	10	11	12	13	14	15	16	17	18	19	20	21	22	23	24	25	26	27	28	29	30	31	32	33	34	35	36	37	38
Ground	H	A	H	A	A	H	A	H	A	H	H	A	H	A	H	A	H	A	H	A	H	A	H	H	A	H	A	H	A	H	A	A	H	A	H	A	H	A
Result	W	W	L	D	D	W	W	D	D	L	D	D	W	L	W	D	L	D	L	L	W	L	D	W	D	D	L	W	W	D	D	L	L	L	W	L	W	W
Position	1	1	4	7	6	5	4	6	4	7	7	7	6	7	6	7	7	8	8	9	8	9	11	9	10	10	10	8	8	9	9	10	10	11	10	11	10	10

Updated to match(es) played on 31 May 2015. Source: Competitive matches
A = Away; H = Home; W = Win; D = Draw; L = Loss

==== Matches ====
31 August 2014 1	Milan	3–1	Lazio	Milan
18:00 CEST (UTC+02:00)	Honda 7'; De Jong (yellow card) 20'; Muntari 56'; Ménez 64' (pen.); López (yellow card) 71'	Report	Radu (yellow card) 25'; Lulić (yellow card) 37'; De Vrij (yellow card) 62'; Alex 67' (o.g.)	Stadium: San Siro; Attendance: 36,674; Referee: Paolo Tagliavento

14 September 2014 2	Parma	4–5	Milan	Parma
20:45 CEST (UTC+02:00)	Cassano 27'; Lucarelli (yellow card) 45', (goal) 73'; Felipe (yellow card) 24' (yellow-red card) 77', (goal) 51'; De Ceglie (yellow card) 70'; Acquah (yellow card) 85'; De Sciglio 89' (o.g.)	Report	Bonera (yellow card) 16' (yellow-red card) 58'; Bonaventura 25'; Honda 38'; Ménez 45' (pen.), 79'; De Jong (yellow card) 60', (goal) 68'	Stadium: Stadio Ennio Tardini; Attendance: 14,264; Referee: Davide Massa

20 September 2014 3	Milan	0–1	Juventus	Milan
20:45 CEST (UTC+02:00)	Muntari (yellow card) 84'; Torres (yellow card) 90+1'	Report	Marchisio (yellow card) 42'; Ogbonna (yellow card) 63'; Tevez 71'; Asamoah (yellow card) 90+1'	Stadium: San Siro; Attendance: 78,681; Referee: Nicola Rizzoli

23 September 2014 4	Empoli	2–2	Milan	Empoli
20:45 CEST (UTC+02:00)	Tonelli 13'; Pucciarelli 21'; Vecino (yellow card) 42'; Valdifiori (yellow card) 85' (yellow-red card) 86'	Report	Zapata (yellow card) 20'; Muntari (yellow card) 36'; Torres 43'; De Sciglio (yellow card) 50'; Honda 57'	Stadium: Stadio Carlo Castellani; Attendance: 12,619; Referee: Gianpaolo Calvarese

28 September 2014 5	Cesena	1–1	Milan	Cesena
15:00 CEST (UTC+02:00)	Succi 10'; Coppola (yellow card) 17'; Cascione (yellow card) 22'; Renzetti (yellow card) 57'; De Feudis (yellow card) 90+1'	Report	Rami 19'; Bonaventura (yellow card) 44'; De Jong (yellow card) 69'; Zapata (red card) 73'	Stadium: Stadio Dino Manuzzi; Attendance: 22,027; Referee: Marco Guida

4 October 2014 6	Milan	2–0	Chievo	Milan
20:45 CEST (UTC+02:00)	Muntari 55'; De Jong (yellow card) 65'; Honda 78'; El Shaarawy (yellow card) 90+5'	Report	Birsa (yellow card) 26'; Biraghi (yellow card) 44'; Cofie (yellow card) 77'; Zukanović (yellow card) 79'; Meggiorini (yellow card) 80'	Stadium: San Siro; Attendance: 34,601; Referee: Paolo Mazzoleni

19 October 2014 7	Verona	1–3	Milan	Verona
15:00 CEST (UTC+02:00)	Agostini (yellow card) 29'; Márquez (yellow card) 72' (yellow-red card) 90+3'; López 87'; Tachtsidis (yellow card) 90+2'	Report	Marques 21' (o.g.); Honda 27', 56', (yellow card) 83'	Stadium: Stadio Marc'Antonio Bentegodi; Attendance: 27,125; Referee: Paolo Valeri

26 October 2014 8	Milan	1–1	Fiorentina	Milan
20:45 CET (UTC+01:00)	De Jong 25', (yellow card) 80'; Muntari (yellow card) 61'	Report	Cuadrado (yellow card) 40'; Iličić 64'; Gonzalo (yellow card) 88'	Stadium: San Siro; Attendance: 38,384; Referee: Luca Banti

29 October 2014 9	Cagliari	1–1	Milan	Cagliari
20:45 CET (UTC+01:00)	Avelar (yellow card) 5'; Ibarbo 24'; Crisetig (yellow card) 80'; Ekdal (yellow card) 90'	Report	Muntari (yellow card) 9'; Bonaventura 34'; Rami (yellow card) 56'	Stadium: Stadio Sant'Elia; Attendance: 15,500; Referee: Daniele Doveri

2 November 2014 10	Milan	0–2	Palermo	Milan
20:45 CET (UTC+01:00)	De Jong (yellow card) 17'; El Shaarawy (yellow card) 51'; Rami (yellow card) 88'	Report	González (yellow card) 16'; Morganella (yellow card) 19'; Zapata 23' (o.g.); Dybala 26'; Anđelković (yellow card) 45+1'	Stadium: San Siro; Attendance: 28,272; Referee: Andrea Gervasoni

8 November 2014 11	Sampdoria	2–2	Milan	Genoa
20:45 CET (UTC+01:00)	Okaka 45+1'; Éder 51'; Duncan (yellow card) 56'	Report	El Shaarawy 9'; Bonera (yellow card) 27' (yellow-red card) 84'; Mexès (yellow card) 36'; Ménez 65' (pen.); De Sciglio (yellow card) 75'; De Jong (yellow card) 82'	Stadium: Stadio Luigi Ferraris; Attendance: 23,893; Referee: Daniele Orsato

23 November 2014 12	Milan	1–1	Internazionale	Milan
20:45 CET (UTC+01:00)	Ménez 23'; Mexès (yellow card) 28'; Bonaventura (yellow card) 66'	Report	Obi (yellow card) 32', (goal) 61'; Juan (yellow card) 68'	Stadium: San Siro; Attendance: 79,173; Referee: Marco Guida

30 November 2014 13	Milan	2–0	Udinese	Milan
15:00 CET (UTC+01:00)	Essien (yellow card) 54' (yellow-red card) 71'; Ménez 65' (pen.), 75'	Report	Badu (yellow card) 60'; Domizzi (red card) 62'; Danilo (yellow card) 64'	Stadium: San Siro; Attendance: 36,170; Referee: Paolo Valeri

7 December 2014 14	Genoa	1–0	Milan	Genoa
15:00 CET (UTC+01:00)	Antonelli 32', (yellow card) 56'; Sturaro (yellow card) 73'; Perotti (yellow card) 91'	Report	Rami (yellow card) 58'; Mexès (yellow card) 62'	Stadium: Stadio Luigi Ferraris; Attendance: 21,319; Referee: Paolo Tagliavento

14 December 2014 15	Milan	2–0	Napoli	Milan
20:45 CET (UTC+01:00)	Ménez 6'; Montolivo (yellow card) 20'; Bonera (yellow card) 45'; Bonaventura 52'; Poli (yellow card) 64'	Report	Ghoulam (yellow card) 45'; Albiol (yellow card) 58'	Stadium: San Siro; Attendance: 35,867; Referee: Antonio Damato

20 December 2014 16	Roma	0–0	Milan	Rome
20:45 CET (UTC+01:00)	Maicon (yellow card) 60'; Florenzi (yellow card) 64'; De Rossi (yellow card) 74'; Destro (yellow card) 87'	Report	Armero (yellow card) 39' (yellow-red card) 70'; De Jong (yellow card) 68'; Mexès (yellow card) 86'	Stadium: Stadio Olimpico; Attendance: 46,620; Referee: Nicola Rizzoli

6 January 2015 17	Milan	1–2	Sassuolo	Milan
15:00 CET (UTC+01:00)	Poli 9', (yellow card) 90+4'; Alex (yellow card) 34'; Ménez (yellow card) 60'	Report	Sansone 28'; Cannavaro (yellow card) 60'; Zaza 67'; Gazzola (yellow card) 74'; Biondini (yellow card) 90+4'	Stadium: San Siro; Attendance: 35,034; Referee: Marco Di Bello

10 January 2015 18	Torino	1–1	Milan	Turin
20:45 CET (UTC+01:00)	Glik (yellow card) 15' (goal) 80'	Report	Ménez 2' (pen.); De Sciglio (yellow card) 30' (yellow-red card) 45+3'; Niang (yellow card) 42'; Muntari (yellow card) 46'; Bonaventura (yellow card) 84'	Stadium: Stadio Olimpico di Torino; Attendance: 14,350; Referee: Gianluca Rocchi

18 January 2015 19	Milan	0–1	Atalanta	Milan
15:00 CET (UTC+01:00)	Abate (yellow card) 45'; Rami (yellow card) 54'	Report	Denis 33' (yellow card) 41'; Stendardo (yellow card) 48'; Sportiello (yellow card) 72'; Cigarini (yellow card) 78'; Benalouane (yellow card) 87'	Stadium: San Siro; Attendance: 27,836; Referee: Carmine Russo

24 January 2015 20	Lazio	3–1	Milan	Rome
20:45 CET (UTC+01:00)	Radu (yellow card) 3'; Biglia (yellow card) 36'; Cataldi (yellow card) 40'; Parolo 47', 81'; Klose 51'; Mauri (yellow card) 90+3'	Report	Alex (yellow card) 3'; Ménez 4'; Poli (yellow card) 10'; Armero (yellow card) 42'; Mexès (red card) 90+2'	Stadium: Stadio Olimpico; Attendance: 32,228; Referee: Paolo Mazzoleni

1 February 2015 21	Milan	3–1	Parma	Milan
20:45 CET (UTC+01:00)	Ménez 17' (pen.), 57'; Van Ginkel (yellow card) 24'; Destro (yellow card) 38'; Zaccardo 76'	Report	Gobbi (yellow card) 20'; Nocerino 24'; Lucarelli (yellow card) 31'; Mariga (yellow card) 62'	Stadium: San Siro; Attendance: 24,396; Referee: Daniele Doveri

7 February 2015 22	Juventus	3–1	Milan	Turin
20:45 CET (UTC+01:00)	Tevez 14', (yellow card) 90'; Bonucci 31'; Padoin (yellow card) 60'; Morata 65'	Report	Antonelli 28'; Essien (yellow card) 34'	Stadium: Juventus Stadium; Attendance: 39,015; Referee: Antonio Damato

15 February 2015 23	Milan	1–1	Empoli	Milan
12:30 CET (UTC+01:00)	Destro 40'; Rami (yellow card) 49'; Antonelli (yellow card) 64'; Paletta (yellow card) 81'; Diego López (red card) 84'	Report	Maccarone 68'; Verdi (yellow card) 79'; Tonelli (yellow card) 90'	Stadium: San Siro; Attendance: 27,170; Referee: Paolo Valeri

22 February 2015 24	Milan	2–0	Cesena	Milan
15:00 CET (UTC+01:00)	Bonaventura 22'; Bocchetti (yellow card) 31'; Pazzini 90' (pen.)	Report	Lucchini (yellow card) 8'; Nica (yellow card) 62'; Volta (yellow card) 88'; Giorgi (yellow card) 89'; Mudingayi (yellow card) 90+2'; Carbonero (yellow card) 90+2'	Stadium: San Siro; Attendance: 27,958; Referee: Dino Tommasi

28 February 2015 25	Chievo	0–0	Milan	Verona
21:00 CET (UTC+01:00)	Meggiorini (yellow card) 60'	Report	Ménez (yellow card) 32'; Alex (yellow card) 75'; Antonelli (yellow card) 85'	Stadium: Stadio Marc'Antonio Bentegodi; Attendance: 16,128; Referee: Gianpaolo Calvarese

7 March 2015 26	Milan	2–2	Verona	Milan
20:45 CET (UTC+01:00)	Poli (yellow card) 22'; Ménez 41' (pen.); Tachtsidis 47' (o.g.)	Report	Toni 18' (pen.); Ioniță (yellow card) 31'; Hallfreðsson (yellow card) 59'; López 90+5', (yellow card) 90+5'	Stadium: San Siro; Attendance: 29,510; Referee: Piero Giacomelli

16 March 2015 27	Fiorentina	2–1	Milan	Florence
19:00 CET (UTC+01:00)	Pasqual (yellow card) 52'; Gonzalo (yellow card) 60', (goal) 83'; Iličić (yellow card) 73'; Joaquín 89'	Report	Ménez (yellow card) 22'; Van Ginkel (yellow card) 29'; Mexès (yellow card) 34'; Destro 56'; López (yellow card) 76'	Stadium: Stadio Artemio Franchi; Attendance: 31,432; Referee: Carmine Russo

21 March 2015 28	Milan	3–1	Cagliari	Milan
20:45 CET (UTC+01:00)	Ménez 21', 78' (pen.); Mexès 49'; De Jong (yellow card) 73'	Report	Crisetig (yellow card) 31'; González (yellow card) 45+2'; Farias 47', (yellow card) 50'; Ceppitelli (yellow card) 77'	Stadium: San Siro; Attendance: 30,748; Referee: Paolo Tagliavento

4 April 2015 29	Palermo	1–2	Milan	Palermo
15:00 CEST (UTC+02:00)	Vitiello (yellow card) 67'; Dybala 72' (pen.); Jajalo (yellow card) 73'	Report	Cerci 37'; Abate (yellow card) 62'; Paletta (yellow card) 71'; Ménez 83'; Mexès (yellow card) 90+2'	Stadium: Stadio Renzo Barbera; Attendance: 15,113; Referee: Daniele Doveri

12 April 2015 30	Milan	1–1	Sampdoria	Milan
20:45 CEST (UTC+02:00)	Paletta (yellow card) 52'; De Jong 74', (yellow card) 83'; Mexès (yellow card) 90+5'	Report	Obiang (yellow card) 43'; Soriano 58'; Wszołek (yellow card) 90+5'	Stadium: San Siro; Attendance: 30,735; Referee: Gianluca Rocchi

19 April 2015 31	Internazionale	0–0	Milan	Milan
20:45 CEST (UTC+02:00)	Medel (yellow card) 28'; Juan (yellow card) 35'; D'Ambrosio (yellow card) 83'; Hernanes (yellow card) 84'	Report	De Jong (yellow card) 33'; Abate (yellow card) 82'	Stadium: San Siro; Attendance: 74,022; Referee: Luca Banti

25 April 2015 32	Udinese	2–1	Milan	Udine
18:00 CEST (UTC+02:00)	Domizzi (yellow card) 29'; Pinzi (yellow card) 38', (goal) 58'; Badu 74'	Report	Pazzini (yellow card) 41', (goal) 88'	Stadium: Stadio Friuli; Attendance: 9,006; Referee: Antonio Damato

29 April 2015 33	Milan	1–3	Genoa	Milan
20:45 CEST (UTC+02:00)	Ménez (yellow card) 29' (yellow-red card) 72'; Mexes (yellow card) 50', (goal) 66'; Abate (yellow card) 90+1'	Report	Edenílson (yellow card) 28'; Bertolacci 36'; Burdisso (yellow card) 45'; Niang 49'; Costa (yellow card) 54'; Falque (yellow card) 79', (goal) 90+3' (pen.)	Stadium: San Siro; Attendance: 25,916; Referee: Piero Giacomelli

3 May 2015 34	Napoli	3–0	Milan	Naples
20:45 CEST (UTC+02:00)	Albiol (yellow card) 65'; Hamšík 70', (yellow card) 71'; Higuaín 74'; Gabbiadini 76'	Report	De Sciglio (red card) 1'	Stadium: Stadio San Paolo; Attendance: 25,469; Referee: Paolo Mazzoleni

9 May 2015 35	Milan	2–1	Roma	Milan
20:45 CEST (UTC+02:00)	Van Ginkel 40'; Destro 59', (yellow card) 71'; Abate (yellow card) 89'; Mexès (yellow card) 90+1'	Report	Torosidis (yellow card) 44'; Florenzi (yellow card) 60'; Pjanić (yellow card) 64'; Totti 73' (pen.)	Stadium: San Siro; Attendance: 35,614; Referee: Paolo Tagliavento

17 May 2015 36	Sassuolo	3–2	Milan	Reggio Emilia
12:30 CEST (UTC+02:00)	Berardi 13', 31', 77'; Missiroli (yellow card) 45+1'; Consigli (yellow card) 72'	Report	Bonaventura (yellow card) 16' (yellow-red card) 57', (goal) 33'; Bonera (yellow card) 39'; Alex 51'; Honda (yellow card) 72'; El Shaarawy (yellow card) 84'; Paletta (yellow card) 86'; Suso (red card) 90+4'	Stadium: Mapei Stadium – Città del Tricolore; Attendance: 13,777; Referee: Marco Guida

24 May 2015 37	Milan	3–0	Torino	Milan
20:45 CEST (UTC+02:00)	Honda (yellow card) 11'; El Shaarawy 18', 65'; Zaccardo (red card) 43'; Poli (yellow card) 45'; Pazzini 57' (pen.), (yellow card) 63' van Ginkel (yellow card) 78'	Report	Gazzi (yellow card) 40'; Moretti (yellow card) 51'; Molinaro (red card) 56'	Stadium: San Siro; Attendance: 33,818; Referee: Paolo Valeri

30 May 2015 38	Atalanta	1–3	Milan	Bergamo
20:45 CEST (UTC+02:00)	Baselli 21'; Masiello (yellow card) 58'; Cigarini (yellow card) 60'; D'Alessandro (yellow card) 89'	Report	Pazzini 36' (pen.); Bonaventura 38', 80'	Stadium: Stadio Atleti Azzurri d'Italia; Attendance: 18,426; Referee: Riccardo Pinzani

=== Coppa Italia ===
13 January 2015 Round of 16	Milan	2–1	Sassuolo	Milan
21.00 CET (UTC+01:00)	De Jong (yellow card) 25', (goal) 86'; Pazzini 38'; Zapata (yellow card) 64'	Report	Sansone 64' (pen.); Missiroli (yellow card) 67'; Biondini (yellow card) 76'; Cannavaro (yellow card) 85'; Antei (yellow card) 93'	Stadium: San Siro; Referee: Dino Tommasi

27 January 2015 Quarter-finals	Milan	0–1	Lazio	Milan
20:45 CET (UTC+01:00)	Rami (yellow card) 64'	Report	Biglia 38' (pen.); Cana (yellow card) 40' (yellow-red card) 45'; Keita (yellow card) 85'	Stadium: San Siro; Referee: Gianluca Rocchi

== Statistics ==
=== Appearances and goals ===
No.	Nationality	Position	Name	Serie A		Coppa Italia		Total		Yellow card	Double yellow card	Red card	O.G.
No.	Nationality	Position	Name	Apps	Goals	Apps	Goals	Apps	Goals	Yellow card	Double yellow card	Red card	O.G.
Goalkeepers
1	(Italy)	GK	Michael Agazzi	0	0	0	0	0	0	0	0	0	0
23	(Spain)	GK	Diego López	28	0	0	0	28	0	1	0	0	0
32	(Italy)	GK	Christian Abbiati	11	0	2	0	13	0	0	0	0	0
Defenders
2	(Italy)	RB / LB	Mattia De Sciglio	17	0	1	0	18	0	2	0	0	1
5	(France)	CB	Philippe Mexès	20	2	0	0	20	2	4	0	0	0
13	(France)	CB	Adil Rami	21	1	1	0	22	1	3	0	0	0
14	(Italy)	LB	Michelangelo Albertazzi	0	0	1	0	1	0	0	0	0	0
17	(Colombia)	CB	Cristián Zapata	12	0	1	0	13	0	1	0	1	1
19	(Italy)	DF	Salvatore Bocchetti	9	0	0	0	9	0	0	0	0	0
20	(Italy)	RB	Ignazio Abate	23	0	2	0	25	0	0	0	0	0
25	(Italy)	CB	Daniele Bonera	16	0	1	0	17	0	5	2	0	0
29	(Italy)	DF	Gabriel Paletta	14	0	0	0	14	0	0	1	0	0
31	(Italy)	LB	Luca Antonelli	12	1	0	0	12	1	0	1	0	0
33	(Brazil)	CB	Alex	21	1	2	0	23	1	1	0	0	1
81	(Italy)	CB / RB	Cristian Zaccardo	3	1	0	0	3	1	0	0	0	0
96	(Italy)	RB	Davide Calabria	1	0	0	0	1	0	0	0	0	0
Midfielders
4	(Ghana)	CM	Sulley Muntari	16	2	1	0	17	2	4	0	0	0
8	(Spain)	AM / RW	Suso	5	0	1	0	6	0	0	0	0	0
10	(Japan)	AM / RW	Keisuke Honda	29	6	1	0	30	6	1	0	0	0
15	(Ghana)	DM	Michael Essien	13	0	0	0	13	0	2	1	0	0
16	(Italy)	CM	Andrea Poli	33	1	2	0	35	1	2	0	0	0
18	(Italy)	CM	Riccardo Montolivo	10	0	2	0	12	0	1	0	0	0
21	(Netherlands)	CM	Marco van Ginkel	17	1	1	0	18	1	0	0	0	0
28	(Italy)	AM / LW	Giacomo Bonaventura	33	7	1	0	34	7	2	0	0	0
34	(Netherlands)	DM	Nigel de Jong	29	3	1	1	30	4	8	0	0	0
36	(Italy)	DM	Alessandro Mastalli	1	0	0	0	1	0	0	0	0	0
37	(Italy)	LM	Gian Filippo Felicioli	1	0	0	0	1	0	0	0	0	0
Forwards
7	(France)	LW / ST / RW	Jérémy Ménez	33	16	1	0	34	16	1	0	0	0
9	(Italy)	ST	Mattia Destro	15	3	0	0	15	3	0	0	0	0
11	(Italy)	ST	Giampaolo Pazzini	26	4	2	1	28	5	0	0	0	0
22	(Italy)	RW	Alessio Cerci	16	1	2	0	18	1	0	0	0	0
35	(Italy)	LW	Davide Di Molfetta	1	0	0	0	1	0	0	0	0	0
92	(Italy)	LW	Stephan El Shaarawy	18	3	1	0	19	3	2	0	0	0
98	(Italy)	LW	Hachim Mastour	0	0	0	0	0	0	0	0	0	0
Other
NN			Own goals		2		0		2				
Players transferred out during season
8	(Italy)	AM	Riccardo Saponara	1	0	0	0	1	0	0	0	0	0
9	(Spain)	ST	Fernando Torres	10	1	0	0	10	1	1	0	0	0
19	(France)	LW / RW	M'Baye Niang	5	0	0	0	5	0	0	0	0	0
27	(Colombia)	LB	Pablo Armero	8	0	0	0	8	0	0	1	0	0

Last update: 1 June 2015
