= 2013–14 AC Milan season =

Milan
2013–14 season
- Chairman Honorary chairman: Vacant; Silvio Berlusconi
- Head coach: Massimiliano Allegri (until 13 January 2014); Mauro Tassotti (interim, from 14–15 January 2014); Clarence Seedorf (from 16 January 2014)
- Stadium: San Siro
- Serie A: 8th
- Coppa Italia: Quarter-finals
- UEFA Champions League: Round of 16
- Top goalscorer: League: Mario Balotelli (14); All: Mario Balotelli (18)
- Highest home attendance: 75,589 (Serie A) vs Juventus (2 March 2014)
- Lowest home attendance: 10,227 (Coppa Italia) vs Udinese (22 January 2014)
- Average home league attendance: 39,874
Home colours	Away colours	Third colours

In the 2013–14 season, Associazione Calcio Milan competed in Serie A for the 80th time, as well as the Coppa Italia and the UEFA Champions League. It was the club's 31st consecutive season in the top flight of Italian football.

By early 2014, it was clear that Milan were performing exceptionally poorly, prompting manager Massimiliano Allegri to be replaced by Clarence Seedorf in mid-January.

That same month, Milan was eliminated from the Coppa Italia in the quarter-finals (their second match of the tournament) by Udinese.

By February, Milan found themselves as low as 11th place in Serie A. They finished the season in 8th, failing to qualify to either the Champions League or Europa League for the following season for the first time in fifteen years.

In the Champions League, Milan secured a place in the group stage after defeating PSV Eindhoven in the play-off round 4–1 on aggregate. On 11 December 2013, Milan qualified for the knockout stage of the competition after playing to a 0–0 draw against Ajax, securing second place in the group behind leaders Barcelona. The Rossoneri were then matched in the round of 16 against Atlético Madrid, who defeated Milan 1–0 at the San Siro and 4–1 in Madrid, advancing 5–1 on aggregate. This continued Milan's run of never eliminating a Spanish club in the knockout phase of the competition since its refurbishment in 1992.

== Players ==
=== First team squad ===

Starting line-up. Clarence Seedorf's 4–2–3–1. Honda and Robinho were often used as right and left wingers in place of Poli and Taarabt, respectively.

As of 30 January 2014.

Note: Flags indicate national team as defined under FIFA eligibility rules; some limited exceptions apply. Players may hold more than one non-FIFA nationality.

No.	Pos.	Nation	Player
1	GK	ITA	Marco Amelia
2	DF	ITA	Mattia De Sciglio
4	MF	GHA	Sulley Muntari
5	DF	FRA	Philippe Mexès
7	FW	BRA	Robinho
8	MF	ITA	Riccardo Saponara
10	MF	JPN	Keisuke Honda
11	FW	ITA	Giampaolo Pazzini
13	DF	FRA	Adil Rami (on loan from Valencia)
14	MF	SVN	Valter Birsa
15	MF	GHA	Michael Essien
16	MF	ITA	Andrea Poli
17	DF	COL	Cristián Zapata
18	MF	ITA	Riccardo Montolivo (captain)
20	DF	ITA	Ignazio Abate

No.	Pos.	Nation	Player
21	DF	GUI	Kévin Constant
22	FW	BRA	Kaká (vice-captain)
23	FW	MAR	Adel Taarabt (on loan from Queens Park Rangers)
24	MF	ITA	Bryan Cristante
25	DF	ITA	Daniele Bonera
26	DF	ARG	Matías Silvestre (on loan from Inter Milan)
28	MF	NED	Urby Emanuelson
32	GK	ITA	Christian Abbiati (vice-captain)
34	MF	NED	Nigel de Jong
35	GK	ITA	Ferdinando Coppola
37	FW	ITA	Andrea Petagna
45	FW	ITA	Mario Balotelli
59	GK	BRA	Gabriel
81	DF	ITA	Cristian Zaccardo
92	FW	ITA	Stephan El Shaarawy

=== UEFA Champions League squad ===
==== A List ====
As of 4 February 2014.

Note: Flags indicate national team as defined under FIFA eligibility rules; some limited exceptions apply. Players may hold more than one non-FIFA nationality.

No.	Pos.	Nation	Player
1	GK	ITA	Marco Amelia
2	DF	ITA	Mattia De Sciglio
4	MF	GHA	Sulley Muntari
5	DF	FRA	Philippe Mexès
7	FW	BRA	Robinho
8	MF	ITA	Riccardo Saponara
10	MF	JPN	Keisuke Honda
11	FW	ITA	Giampaolo Pazzini
13	DF	FRA	Adil Rami (on loan from Valencia)
14	MF	SVN	Valter Birsa
15	MF	GHA	Michael Essien
16	MF	ITA	Andrea Poli
17	DF	COL	Cristián Zapata
18	MF	ITA	Riccardo Montolivo (captain)
20	DF	ITA	Ignazio Abate

No.	Pos.	Nation	Player
21	DF	GUI	Kévin Constant
22	FW	BRA	Kaká (vice-captain)
24	MF	ITA	Bryan Cristante
25	DF	ITA	Daniele Bonera
26	DF	ARG	Matías Silvestre (on loan from Inter)
27	FW	MAR	Adel Taarabt (on loan from QPR)
28	MF	NED	Urby Emanuelson
32	GK	ITA	Christian Abbiati (vice-captain)
34	MF	NED	Nigel de Jong
35	GK	ITA	Ferdinando Coppola
45	FW	ITA	Mario Balotelli
59	GK	BRA	Gabriel
81	DF	ITA	Cristian Zaccardo

==== B List ====
Note: Flags indicate national team as defined under FIFA eligibility rules; some limited exceptions apply. Players may hold more than one non-FIFA nationality.

No.	Pos.	Nation	Player
31	MF	SVN	Žan Benedičič
36	DF	ITA	Luca Iotti
37	FW	ITA	Andrea Petagna
38	DF	ITA	Marco Pinato

No.	Pos.	Nation	Player
39	MF	ITA	Alex Pedone
40	MF	BIH	Andrej Modić
61	GK	ITA	Lorenzo Ferrari
92	FW	ITA	Stephan El Shaarawy

== Pre-season and friendlies ==
Win Draw Loss

The Rossoneri resume training on 8 July 2013. They will play their first set of friendlies in Reggio Emilia in Città del Tricolore on 23 July to contest the TIM Trophy consisting of three games. Each game is 45 minutes each and this year, will be played against newly promoted Sassuolo and Serie A Champions Juventus. On Saturday, 27 July 2013, Milan will play Spanish side Valencia at the Mestalla in Valencia as part of the Guinness International Champions Cup. They will then travel in Munich to take part in the Audi Cup, to be played on 31 July and 1 August 2013 at Allianz Arena against two of Bayern Munich, Manchester City and São Paulo. After this, they will fly to New York to play the final stages of the Guinness International Champions Cup between 4 and 7 August 2013 at MetLife Stadium. Milan will conclude their pre-season with the UEFA Champions League Play-off round, with their opponents due to be drawn on 9 August 2013 with the games being played between 20 and 28 August 2013.

=== Friendly ===
20 July 2013 Friendly	Milan	5–1	Pergolettese	Carnago, Italy
17:30 CEST	Traoré 19'; Emanuelson 30'; Robinho 32'; Boateng 61'; Petagna 75'		Zanola 89'	Stadium: Milanello; Attendance: c. 4,000

23 July 2013 TIM Trophy	Juventus	0–0 (6–7 p)	Milan	Reggio Emilia, Italy
				Stadium: Città del Tricolore; Referee: Andrea Gervasoni (Italy)
	Penalties
	Vidal (penalty scored); Lichtsteiner (penalty missed); Tevez (penalty scored); Asamoah (penalty scored); Vučinić (penalty scored); Peluso (penalty scored); De Ceglie (penalty scored); Padoin (penalty missed)		(penalty scored) Robinho; (penalty scored) De Jong; (penalty scored) Mexès; (penalty scored) Niang; (penalty missed) Nocerino; (penalty scored) Bonera; (penalty scored) Traoré; (penalty scored) Zaccardo
Note: 45-minute match

23 July 2013 TIM Trophy	Sassuolo	2–1	Milan	Reggio Emilia, Italy
	Masucci 12', 45'		Petagna 4'	Stadium: Città del Tricolore; Referee: Andrea Gervasoni (Italy)
Note: 45-minute match

27 July 2013 International Champions Cup	Valencia	1–2	Milan	Valencia, Spain
20:00 CEST	Parejo 53'	Report	Robinho 21'; De Jong 38'	Stadium: Mestalla; Attendance: 17,000; Referee: Carbonell Hernández (Spain)

31 July 2013 Audi Cup	Manchester City	5–3	Milan	Munich, Germany
18:15 CEST	Silva 3'; Richards 19'; Kolarov 22'; Džeko 33', 36'	Report	El Shaarawy 37', 39'; Petagna 43'	Stadium: Allianz Arena; Attendance: 35,000; Referee: Peter Sippel (Germany)

1 August 2013 Audi Cup	Milan	1–0	São Paulo	Munich, Germany
16:00 EDT (UTC−04:00)	K. Boateng 52'	Report		Stadium: Allianz Arena; Attendance: 35,000; Referee: Günter Perl (Germany)

4 August 2013 International Champions Cup	Milan	0–2	Chelsea	East Rutherford, New Jersey, USA
18:30 EDT (UTC−04:00)			De Bruyne 29'; Schürrle 90+1'	Stadium: MetLife Stadium; Attendance: 39,764; Referee: Jose Carlos Rivera (United States)

7 August 2013 International Champions Cup	LA Galaxy	0–2	Milan	Miami Gardens, Florida, USA
18:30 EDT (UTC−04:00)			Balotelli 17'; Niang 40'	Stadium: Sun Life Stadium; Attendance: 67,273; Referee: Ted Unkel (United States)

17 August 2013 Friendly	Milan	11–0	Derthona	Carnago, Italy
17:30 CEST	Nocerino 17'; Balotelli 21', 42'; Silvestre 31'; El Shaarawy 34'; Muntari 48'; Zaccardo 58'; Petagna 65'; Dimitrio 77' (o.g.); Niang 81', 88'			Stadium: Milanello; Attendance: c. 1,000

7 September 2013 Trofeo Città di Chiasso	Chiasso	0–4	Milan	Chiasso, Switzerland
18:00 CEST			Nocerino 7'; Silvestre 23'; Robinho 40'; Saponara 86'	Stadium: Stadio Comunale; Referee: Luca Gut (Switzerland)

13 October 2013 Caen 100th Anniversary	Caen	3–0	Milan	Caen, France
17:00 CEST	Appiah 3'; Duhamel 17'; Koita 55'	Report		Stadium: Stade Michel d'Ornano; Attendance: 14,129; Referee: Fredy Fautrel (France)

16 November 2013 Friendly	Young Boys	1–3	Milan	Bern, Switzerland
18:30 CEST	Nuzzolo 39'	Report	Kaká 56'; Saponara 71'; Cristante 74'	Stadium: Stade de Suisse, Wankdorf; Attendance: 12,272; Referee: Alain Bieri (Switzerland)

== Competitions ==
Win Draw Loss

=== Serie A ===
The season will start on 24 August 2013 and conclude on 18 May 2014.

==== League table ====
Pos	Team	Pld	W	D	L	GF	GA	GD	Pts	Qualification or relegation
6	Parma	38	15	13	10	58	46	+12	58	
7	Torino	38	15	12	11	58	48	+10	57 (Note: Torino finished ahead of Milan on goal difference : Torino 2-2 Milan, Milan 1-1 Torino; Torino = +10, Milan = +8.)	Qualification for the Europa League third qualifying round (Note: The FIGC rejected the application of Parma for a UEFA licence, because Parma had overdue tax debt; their place went to seventh-place Torino, which had a UEFA licence.)
8	Milan	38	16	9	13	57	49	+8	57	
9	Lazio	38	15	11	12	54	54	0	56	
10	Hellas Verona	38	16	6	16	62	68	−6	54	

Source: Serie A, Soccerway
Rules for classification: 1st points; 2nd head-to-head points; 3rd head-to-head goal difference; 4th goal difference; 5th number of goals scored; 6th public draw.
(Head-to-head record is applied for clubs with the same number of points only once all matches between said clubs have been played)

==== Results summary ====
Overall								Home						Away					
Pld	W	D	L	GF	GA	GD	Pts	W	D	L	GF	GA	GD	W	D	L	GF	GA	GD
38	16	9	13	57	49	+8	57	11	4	4	28	17	+11	5	5	9	29	32	−3

Last updated: 4 May 2014.
Source: Competitive matches

==== Results by round ====
Round	1	2	3	4	5	6	7	8	9	10	11	12	13	14	15	16	17	18	19	20	21	22	23	24	25	26	27	28	29	30	31	32	33	34	35	36	37	38
Ground	A	H	A	H	A	H	A	H	A	H	H	A	H	A	A	H	A	H	A	H	A	H	A	H	A	H	A	H	A	A	H	A	H	H	A	H	A	H
Result	L	W	D	L	D	W	L	W	L	D	L	D	D	W	D	D	L	W	L	W	W	D	L	W	W	L	L	L	D	W	W	W	W	W	L	W	L	W
Position	14	6	9	11	12	9	12	8	10	10	11	10	13	8	9	10	13	11	9	10	11	10	9	10	10	11	12	12	11	11	8	11	10	6	10	8	9	8

Updated to match(es) played on 4 May 2014. Source: Competitive matches
A = Away; H = Home; W = Win; D = Draw; L = Loss

==== Matches ====
24 August 2013 1	Hellas Verona	2–1	Milan	Verona
18:00 CEST (UTC+02:00)	Jorginho (yellow card) 20'; Toni 30', 53'; Janković (yellow card) 41'	Report	Poli 14'; Montolivo (yellow card) 26'; Zapata (yellow card) 50'; Balotelli (yellow card) 90'	Stadium: Stadio Marc'Antonio Bentegodi; Attendance: 25,164; Referee: Gianpaolo Calvarese

1 September 2013 2	Milan	3–1	Cagliari	Milan
20:45 CEST (UTC+02:00)	Robinho 8'; Mexès 30'; Balotelli 62'; De Jong (yellow card) 70'	Report	Sau 32'; Conti (yellow card) 39'	Stadium: San Siro; Attendance: 30,471; Referee: Carmine Russo

14 September 2013 3	Torino	2–2	Milan	Turin
20:45 CEST (UTC+02:00)	D'Ambrosio 43'; El Kaddouri (yellow card) 64'; Cerci 71'; Glik (yellow card) 88'	Report	Zapata (yellow card) 45+1'; Muntari 87'; Poli (yellow card) 87'; Balotelli 90+7' (pen.)	Stadium: Stadio Olimpico di Torino; Attendance: 15,000; Referee: Davide Massa

22 September 2013 4	Milan	1–2	Napoli	Milan
20:45 CEST (UTC+02:00)	Poli (yellow card) 62'; De Jong (yellow card) 67'; Balotelli (yellow card) 57' (yellow-red card) 90+4', (goal) 90+1'	Report	Britos 6', (yellow card) 85'; Higuaín 54'	Stadium: San Siro; Attendance: 51,384; Referee: Luca Banti

25 September 2013 5	Bologna	3–3	Milan	Bologna
20:45 CEST (UTC+02:00)	Laxalt 33', 52'; Pazienza (yellow card) 31'; Christodoulopoulos (yellow card) 43'; Mantovani (yellow card) 60'; Cristaldo 62'; Diamanti (yellow card) 88'	Report	De Jong (yellow card) 9'; Poli 12'; Niang (yellow card) 78'; Robinho 89'; Abate 90+2'	Stadium: Stadio Renato Dall'Ara; Attendance: 20,000; Referee: Paolo Tagliavento

28 September 2013 6	Milan	1–0	Sampdoria	Milan
20:45 CEST (UTC+02:00)	Birsa 46'	Report	Costa (yellow card) 14'; Gavazzi (yellow card) 34'; Krstičić (yellow card) 73'	Stadium: San Siro; Attendance: 31,575; Referee: Sebastiano Peruzzo

6 October 2013 7	Juventus	3–2	Milan	Turin
20:45 CEST (UTC+02:00)	Pirlo 15'; Bonucci (yellow card) 23'; Giovinco 69'; Chiellini 75'	Report	Muntari 1', 90', (yellow card) 90+1'; De Jong (yellow card) 14'; Constant (yellow card) 17'; Mexès (yellow card) 69' (yellow-red card) 74'	Stadium: Juventus Stadium; Attendance: 39,594; Referee: Gianluca Rocchi

19 October 2013 8	Milan	1–0	Udinese	Milan
20:45 CEST (UTC+02:00)	Birsa 22'; Montolivo (yellow card) 25'; Muntari (yellow card) 52'; Robinho (yellow card) 81'	Report	Pinzi (yellow card) 20'; Pereyra (yellow card) 52'; Allan (yellow card) 81'	Stadium: San Siro; Attendance: 33,188; Referee: Marco Guida

27 October 2013 9	Parma	3–2	Milan	Parma
15:00 CET (UTC+01:00)	Parolo 11', 90+4', (yellow card) 78'; Cassano 45+1'; Lucarelli (yellow card) 83'; Gargano (yellow card) 90'	Report	Balotelli (yellow card) 34'; Matri 61'; Silvestre 63'; De Jong (yellow card) 83'; Zapata (yellow card) 90+4'	Stadium: Stadio Ennio Tardini; Attendance: 16,800; Referee: Paolo Valeri

30 October 2013 10	Milan	1–1	Lazio	Milan
20:45 CET (UTC+01:00)	Muntari (yellow card) 32'; Kaká 54'; Montolivo (yellow card) 57'; De Sciglio (yellow card) 58'; Balotelli (yellow card) 64'	Report	Radu (yellow card) 34'; Cana (yellow card) 62'; Ciani 72'	Stadium: San Siro; Attendance: 30,212; Referee: Antonio Damato

2 November 2013 11	Milan	0–2	Fiorentina	Milan
20:45 CET (UTC+01:00)	Balotelli (yellow card) 61'	Report	Vargas 27'; Matos (yellow card) 29'; Aquilani (yellow card) 50'; Valero 73'	Stadium: San Siro; Attendance: 44,261; Referee: Paolo Silvio Mazzoleni

10 November 2013 12	Chievo	0–0	Milan	Verona
15:00 CET (UTC+01:00)	Cesar (yellow card) 35'; Rigoni (yellow card) 76'	Report	Montolivo (yellow card) 45' (yellow-red card) 83'	Stadium: Stadio Marc'Antonio Bentegodi; Referee: Daniele Orsato

23 November 2013 13	Milan	1–1	Genoa	Milan
20:45 CET (UTC+01:00)	Kaká 4'; Emanuelson (yellow card) 12'; Zapata (yellow card) 13'; Bonera (yellow card) 89'	Report	Gilardino 8' (pen.); Manfredini (red card) 36'; Biondini (yellow card) 68'; Vrsaljko (yellow card) 89'	Stadium: San Siro; Attendance: 34,848; Referee: Andrea Gervasoni

1 December 2013 14	Catania	1–3	Milan	Catania
12:30 CET (UTC+01:00)	Castro 13'; Plašil (yellow card) 59'; Tachtsidis (red card) 64'; Barrientos (yellow card) 74'	Report	Montolivo 19'; Poli (yellow card) 25'; Silvestre (yellow card) 31'; Bonera (yellow card) 59'; Balotelli 63'; Kaká (yellow card) 80', (goal) 81'	Stadium: Stadio Angelo Massimino; Referee: Nicola Rizzoli

7 December 2013 15	Livorno	2–2	Milan	Livorno
18:00 CET (UTC+01:00)	Biagianti (yellow card) 9'; Coda (yellow card) 20'; Siligardi 26'; Emerson (yellow card) 30'; Paulinho 58', (yellow card) 69'; Mbaye (yellow card) 77'	Report	Balotelli 7', 83'; El Shaarawy (yellow card) 52'; Mexès (yellow card) 90'	Stadium: Stadio Armando Picchi; Referee: Marco Guida

16 December 2013 16	Milan	2–2	Roma	Milan
20:45 CET (UTC+01:00)	Zapata 29'; Gabriel (yellow card) 50'; Montolivo (yellow card) 73'; Kaká (yellow card) 73'; Muntari 77'; Balotelli (yellow card) 83'	Report	De Rossi (yellow card) 11'; Destro 13'; Strootman 51' (pen.), (yellow card) 83'	Stadium: San Siro; Attendance: 37,987; Referee: Gianluca Rocchi

22 December 2013 17	Internazionale	1–0	Milan	Milan
20:45 CET (UTC+01:00)	Guarín (yellow card) 59'; Juan (yellow card) 67'; Rolando (yellow card) 71'; Palacio 86'; Campagnaro (yellow card) 90+3'	Report	De Sciglio (yellow card) 26'; Constant (yellow card) 45'; De Jong (yellow card) 62'; Balotelli (yellow card) 87'; Muntari (red card) 90+3'	Stadium: San Siro; Referee: Paolo Mazzoleni

6 January 2014 18	Milan	3–0	Atalanta	Milan
15:00 CET (UTC+01:00)	Kaká 35', 65'; Matri (yellow card) 48'; Cristante 67'	Report	Raimondi (yellow card) 79'	Stadium: San Siro; Attendance: 34,187

12 January 2014 19	Sassuolo	4–3	Milan	Reggio Emilia
20:45 CET (UTC+01:00)	Berardi 15', 28', 41', 47'; Antei (yellow card) 37'; Ziegler (yellow card) 43'; Zaza (yellow card) 59'; Gazzola (yellow card) 64'; Pegolo (yellow card) 79'	Report	Robinho 9'; Balotelli 13', (yellow card) 36'; Bonera (yellow card) 29'; Montolivo 86'; De Sciglio (yellow card) 89'	Stadium: Mapei Stadium – Città del Tricolore; Referee: Andrea De Marco

19 January 2014 20	Milan	1–0	Hellas Verona	Milan
20:45 CET (UTC+01:00)	Silvestre (yellow card) 72'; Montolivo (yellow card) 79'; Balotelli 82' (pen.)	Report	Maietta (yellow card) 90+1'	Stadium: San Siro; Attendance: 30,953; Referee: Mauro Bergonzi

26 January 2014 21	Cagliari	1–2	Milan	Quartu Sant'Elena
15:00 CET (UTC+01:00)	Sau 28'; Conti (yellow card) 60'; Cabrera (yellow card) 85'; Cossu (yellow card) 89'	Report	Balotelli 87', (yellow card) 87'; Pazzini 89'	Stadium: Stadio Is Arenas; Referee: Daniele Doveri

1 February 2014 22	Milan	1–1	Torino	Milan
20:45 CET (UTC+01:00)	Rami 49'; Pazzini (yellow card) 78'; Bonera (yellow card) 81'	Report	Immobile 17'; Vives (yellow card) 74'; Maksimović (yellow card) 76'	Stadium: San Siro; Attendance: 35,200; Referee: Antonio Damato

8 February 2014 23	Napoli	3–1	Milan	Naples
20:45 CET (UTC+01:00)	Inler 11', (yellow card) 38'; Higuaín 56', 86'; Jorginho (yellow card) 68'; Callejón (yellow card) 87'	Report	Taarabt 7', (yellow card) 54'; Abbiati (yellow card) 22'	Stadium: Stadio San Paolo; Referee: Davide Massa

14 February 2014 24	Milan	1–0	Bologna	Milan
20:45 CET (UTC+01:00)	Zaccardo (yellow card) 85'; Balotelli 86'	Report	Natali (yellow card) 48'; Pérez (yellow card) 87'; Friberg (yellow card) 90+2'	Stadium: San Siro; Attendance: 29,631; Referee: Mauro Bergonzi

23 February 2014 25	Sampdoria	0–2	Milan	Genoa
15:00 CET (UTC+01:00)	Mustafi (yellow card) 32'; Palombo (yellow card) 42'; Costa (yellow card) 60'; López (yellow card) 73' (yellow-red card) 73'; Gabbiadini (yellow card) 74'	Report	Taarabt 12'; Constant (yellow card) 24'; Rami 58'; Muntari (yellow card) 63'; Honda (yellow card) 77'	Stadium: Stadio Luigi Ferraris; Referee: Daniele Doveri

2 March 2014 26	Milan	0–2	Juventus	Milan
20:45 CET (UTC+01:00)	Bonera (yellow card) 83'	Report	Llorente 44'; Marchisio (yellow card) 58'; Pirlo (yellow card) 64'; Tevez 68'	Stadium: San Siro; Attendance: 75,589; Referee: Marco Guida

8 March 2014 27	Udinese	1–0	Milan	Udine
18:00 CET (UTC+01:00)	Fernandes (yellow card) 12'; Di Natale 67'	Report	Muntari (yellow card) 11'; De Sciglio (yellow card) 18'; Mexès (yellow card) 51'	Stadium: Stadio Friuli; Referee: Carmine Russo

16 March 2014 28	Milan	2–4	Parma	Milan
15:00 CET (UTC+01:00)	Abbiati (red card) 5'; Bonera (yellow card) 30'; Mexès (yellow card) 39'; Rami 56', (yellow card) 82'; Balotelli 76' (pen.)	Report	Cassano 9' (pen.), 51'; Marchionni (yellow card) 67'; Obi (yellow card) 75'; Amauri 78'; Biabiany 90+5'	Stadium: San Siro; Attendance: 39,249; Referee: Domenico Celi

23 March 2014 29	Lazio	1–1	Milan	Rome
20:45 CET (UTC+01:00)	Perea (yellow card) 21'; Ledesma (yellow card) 45+1'; González 61'; Lulić (yellow card) 80'	Report	Konko 43' (o.g.); Essien (yellow card) 58'; Poli (yellow card) 70'	Stadium: Stadio Olimpico; Referee: Gianluca Rocchi

26 March 2014 30	Fiorentina	0–2	Milan	Florence
20:45 CET (UTC+01:00)	Ambrosini (yellow card) 19'; Roncaglia (yellow card) 63'; Rodríguez (yellow card) 89'	Report	Balotelli (yellow card) 16', (goal) 64'; Mexès 23', (yellow card) 87'; De Jong (yellow card) 42'; Constant (yellow card) 52'; Taarabt (yellow card) 67'; Abbiati (yellow card) 70'; Bonera (yellow card) 78'	Stadium: Stadio Artemio Franchi; Referee: Daniele Orsato

29 March 2014 31	Milan	3–0	Chievo	Milan
20:45 CEST (UTC+02:00)	Balotelli 4'; Kaká 27', 54'	Report		Stadium: San Siro; Attendance: 34,989; Referee: Piero Giacomelli

7 April 2014 32	Genoa	1–2	Milan	Genoa
21:00 CEST (UTC+02:00)	Sculli (yellow card) 28'; Abbiati 73' (o.g.)	Report	Taarabt 20'; Honda 56'; Abbiati (yellow card) 88'	Stadium: Stadio Luigi Ferraris; Referee: Luca Banti

13 April 2014 33	Milan	1–0	Catania	Milan
20:45 CEST (UTC+02:00)	Montolivo 23'; Mexès (yellow card) 63'	Report	Barrientos (yellow card) 29'; Rolín (yellow card) 87'; Rinaudo (yellow card) 61' (yellow-red card) 78'; Plašil (yellow card) 60'; Monzón (yellow card) 90+2'	Stadium: San Siro; Attendance: 33,014; Referee: Andrea De Marco

19 April 2014 34	Milan	3–0	Livorno	Milan
15:00 CEST (UTC+02:00)	De Jong (yellow card) 24'; Abate (yellow card) 34'; Balotelli 43'; Taarabt 51'; Rami (yellow card) 72'; Pazzini 83'	Report	Duncan (yellow card) 21'; Rinaudo (yellow card) 32'	Stadium: San Siro; Attendance: 38,903; Referee: Massimiliano Irrati

25 April 2014 35	Roma	2–0	Milan	Rome
20:45 CEST (UTC+02:00)	Pjanić 43', (yellow card) 45'; Gervinho 65'; Totti (yellow card) 67'; Nainggolan (yellow card) 70'	Report	Muntari (yellow card) 33'; Honda (yellow card) 39'; Rami (yellow card) 80'	Stadium: Stadio Olimpico; Referee: Paolo Tagliavento

4 May 2014 36	Milan	1–0	Internazionale	Milan
20:45 CEST (UTC+02:00)	Mexès (yellow card) 16'; De Jong 65', (yellow card) 89'; Abbiati (yellow card) 90+2'	Report	Cambiasso (yellow card) 39'; Samuel (yellow card) 75'; Ranocchia (yellow card) 80'	Stadium: San Siro; Attendance: 73,855; Referee: Mauro Bergonzi

11 May 2014 37	Atalanta	2–1	Milan	Bergamo
12:30 CEST (UTC+02:00)	Denis 68' (pen.); Raimondi (yellow card) 69'; Migliaccio (yellow card) 85'; Brienza 90+6'	Report	Bellini 51' (o.g.); Mexès (yellow card) 69'; Taarabt (yellow card) 90+3'	Stadium: Stadio Atleti Azzurri d'Italia; Referee: Nicola Rizzoli

18 May 2014 38	Milan	2–1	Sassuolo	Milan
20:45 CEST (UTC+02:00)	Muntari 2'; De Jong 27'; Mexès (yellow card) 32' (yellow-red card) 68'; De Sciglio (red card) 89'	Report	Ariaudo (yellow card) 43'; Cannavaro (red card) 86'; Zaza 90' (pen.)	Stadium: San Siro; Attendance: 38,119; Referee: Paolo Valeri

=== Coppa Italia ===
Milan entered the 2013–14 Coppa Italia in January, in the round of 16. First opponent was Serie B team Spezia that was defeated easily. In the next round, Milan was surprisingly eliminated by Udinese.

15 January 2014 Round of 16	Milan	3–1	Spezia	Milan, Italy
20:45 CET (UTC+01:00)	Robinho 27'; Pazzini 32'; Honda 47'	Report	Ferrari 90'	Stadium: San Siro; Attendance: 15,584; Referee: Carmine Russo

22 January 2014 Quarter-finals	Milan	1–2	Udinese	Milan, Italy
20:45 CET (UTC+01:00)	Balotelli 7'; Emanuelson (yellow card) 40'; Birsa (yellow card) 52'; De Sciglio (yellow card) 65'; Honda (yellow card) 84'; Mexès (yellow card) 86'	Report	Lazzari (yellow card) 12'; Heurtaux (yellow card) 35'; Danilo (yellow card) 72'; Muriel 41' (pen.); López 77'	Stadium: San Siro; Attendance: 10,227; Referee: Marco Guida

=== UEFA Champions League ===
Milan started their 2013–14 UEFA Champions League campaign in the play-off round against Dutch runners-up PSV, winning over two legs to qualify for the group stage. For the fourth time in the last three Champions League tournaments, Milan were matched-up against Barcelona. Milan qualified as group runners-up, behind the Catalans. Milan were then drawn against Atlético Madrid in the round of 16, who defeated them over both legs.

==== Play-off round ====
20 August 2013 First leg	PSV Eindhoven (Netherlands)	1–1	(Italy) Milan	Eindhoven, Netherlands
20:45 CEST (UTC+02:00)	Maher (yellow card) 45+2'; Matavž 60'	Report	El Shaarawy 15'; Boateng (yellow card) 38'; Muntari (yellow card) 63'; Balotelli (yellow card) 70'	Stadium: Philips Stadion; Attendance: 35,000; Referee: Cüneyt Çakır (Turkey)

28 August 2013 Second leg	Milan (Italy)	3–0 (4–1 agg.)	(Netherlands) PSV Eindhoven	Milan, Italy
20:45 CEST (UTC+02:00)	Boateng 9', 77'; Montolivo (yellow card) 43'; Balotelli 55', (yellow card) 62'; Poli (yellow card) 79'	Report	Schaars (yellow card) 43'; Bruma (yellow card) 52'; Willems (yellow card) 90+1'	Stadium: San Siro; Attendance: 51,598; Referee: Mark Clattenburg (England)

==== Group stage ====
Pos	Team	Pld	W	D	L	GF	GA	GD	Pts	Qualification	BAR	MIL	AJX	CEL
1	(Spain) Barcelona	6	4	1	1	16	5	+11	13	Advance to knockout phase	—	3–1	4–0	6–1
2	(Italy) Milan	6	2	3	1	8	5	+3	9	Advance to knockout phase	1–1	—	0–0	2–0
3	(Netherlands) Ajax	6	2	2	2	5	8	−3	8	Transfer to Europa League	2–1	1–1	—	1–0
4	(Scotland) Celtic	6	1	0	5	3	14	−11	3		0–1	0–3	2–1	—

Source: UEFA

18 September 2013 1	Milan (Italy)	2–0	(Scotland) Celtic	Milan, Italy
20:45 CEST (UTC+02:00)	Izaguirre 82' (o.g.); Muntari 86'	Report	Ambrose (yellow card) 66'; Mulgrew (yellow card) 75'; Brown (yellow card) 85'	Stadium: San Siro; Attendance: 54,623; Referee: Wolfgang Stark (Germany)

1 October 2013 2	Ajax (Netherlands)	1–1	(Italy) Milan	Amsterdam, Netherlands
20:45 CEST (UTC+02:00)	Denswil 90'; Van der Hoorn (yellow card) 90+3'	Report	Constant (yellow card) 42'; Balotelli (yellow card) 60', (goal) 90+4' (pen.)	Stadium: Amsterdam Arena; Attendance: 51,692; Referee: Jonas Eriksson (Sweden)

22 October 2013 3	Milan (Italy)	1–1	(Spain) Barcelona	Milan, Italy
20:45 CEST (UTC+02:00)	Robinho 9'; Montolivo (yellow card) 41'; Muntari (yellow card) 78'	Report	Messi 23'; Sánchez (yellow card) 33'; Fàbregas (yellow card) 81'	Stadium: San Siro; Attendance: 74,487; Referee: Felix Brych (Germany)

6 November 2013 4	Barcelona (Spain)	3–1	(Italy) Milan	Barcelona, Spain
20:45 CET (UTC+01:00)	Messi 30' (pen.), 83'; Busquets 40'; Sánchez (yellow card) 62'	Report	Abate (yellow card) 29'; Muntari (yellow card) 32'; Piqué 45' (o.g.); De Jong (yellow card) 56'	Stadium: Camp Nou; Attendance: 80,517; Referee: Milorad Mažić (Serbia)

26 November 2013 5	Celtic (Scotland)	0–3	(Italy) Milan	Glasgow, Scotland
20:45 CET (UTC+01:00)	Commons (yellow card) 57'; Van Dijk (yellow card) 64'; Izaguirre (yellow card) 65'	Report	Kaká 13'; Zapata 49'; Balotelli 60'	Stadium: Celtic Park; Attendance: 58,619; Referee: Cüneyt Çakır (Turkey)

11 December 2013 6	Milan (Italy)	0–0	(Netherlands) Ajax	Milan, Italy
20:45 CET (UTC+01:00)	Montolivo (red card) 22'; Balotelli (yellow card) 71'; De Jong (yellow card) 83'; De Sciglio (yellow card) 89'; Muntari (yellow card) 90+5'	Report	Blind (yellow card) 63'	Stadium: San Siro; Attendance: 61,744; Referee: Howard Webb (England)

==== Knockout phase ====
===== Round of 16 =====
19 February 2014 First leg	Milan (Italy)	0–1	(Spain) Atlético Madrid	Milan, Italy
20:45 CET (UTC+01:00)	Abate (yellow card) 44'; Bonera (yellow card) 61'; Rami (yellow card) 90+1'	Report	Insúa (yellow card) 20'; Suárez (yellow card) 41'; Costa (yellow card) 69', (goal) 83'; Adrián (yellow card) 90+3'	Stadium: San Siro; Attendance: 65,890; Referee: Pedro Proença (Portugal)

11 March 2014 Second leg	Atlético Madrid (Spain)	4–1 (5–1 agg.)	(Italy) Milan	Madrid, Spain
20:45 CET (UTC+01:00)	Costa 3', 85'; García (yellow card) 5', (goal) 71'; Turan 40'	Report	Rami (yellow card) 7'; Kaká 27'; Balotelli (yellow card) 45+2'; Bonera (yellow card) 70'; Robinho (yellow card) 74'	Stadium: Vicente Calderón Stadium; Attendance: 49,186; Referee: Mark Clattenburg (England)

== Statistics ==
=== Appearances and goals ===
No.	Pos	Nat	Player	Total		Serie A		Coppa Italia		Champions League	
No.	Pos	Nat	Player	Apps	Goals	Apps	Goals	Apps	Goals	Apps	Goals
Goalkeepers
1	GK	(Italy) ITA	Marco Amelia	7	0	4+1	0	1	0	1	0
32	GK	(Italy) ITA	Christian Abbiati	39	0	28	0	2	0	9	0
35	GK	(Italy) ITA	Ferdinando Coppola	0	0	0	0	0	0	0	0
59	GK	(Brazil) BRA	Gabriel	7	0	6+1	0	0	0	0	0
Defenders
2	DF	(Italy) ITA	Mattia De Sciglio	21	0	15+1	0	2	0	3	0
5	DF	(France) FRA	Philippe Mexès	31	2	22	2	1+1	0	6+1	0
13	DF	(France) FRA	Adil Rami	22	3	16+2	3	2	0	2	0
17	DF	(Colombia) COL	Cristián Zapata	29	2	20	1	1	0	8	1
20	DF	(Italy) ITA	Ignazio Abate	28	1	16+3	1	0+1	0	7+1	0
21	DF	(Guinea) GUI	Kévin Constant	26	0	19+1	0	0	0	4+2	0
25	DF	(Italy) ITA	Daniele Bonera	19	0	15+1	0	0	0	3	0
26	DF	(Argentina) ARG	Matías Silvestre	4	1	3+1	1	0	0	0	0
81	DF	(Italy) ITA	Cristian Zaccardo	13	0	8+3	0	1	0	1	0
Midfielders
4	MF	(Ghana) GHA	Sulley Muntari	34	6	21+5	5	0	0	7+1	1
8	MF	(Italy) ITA	Riccardo Saponara	7	0	2+5	0	0	0	0	0
10	MF	(Japan) JPN	Keisuke Honda	16	2	12+2	1	1+1	1	0	0
14	MF	(Slovenia) SVN	Valter Birsa	21	2	11+4	2	1+1	0	3+1	0
15	MF	(Ghana) GHA	Michael Essien	9	0	3+4	0	0	0	2	0
16	MF	(Italy) ITA	Andrea Poli	36	2	17+8	2	1	0	5+5	0
18	MF	(Italy) ITA	Riccardo Montolivo	37	3	27+2	3	1	0	7	0
22	MF	(Brazil) BRA	Kaká	37	9	27+3	7	1	0	6	2
23	MF	(Morocco) MAR	Adel Taarabt	16	4	12+2	4	0	0	2	0
24	MF	(Italy) ITA	Bryan Cristante	4	1	2+1	1	1	0	0	0
28	FW	(Netherlands) NED	Urby Emanuelson	33	0	19+5	0	1	0	5+3	0
34	MF	(Netherlands) NED	Nigel de Jong	44	2	32+1	2	1	0	10	0
Forwards
7	FW	(Brazil) BRA	Robinho	31	5	15+7	3	2	1	3+4	1
11	FW	(Italy) ITA	Giampaolo Pazzini	21	3	6+12	2	1	1	1+1	0
37	FW	(Italy) ITA	Andrea Petagna	4	0	0+3	0	0+1	0	0	0
45	FW	(Italy) ITA	Mario Balotelli	41	18	25+5	14	1	1	8+2	3
92	FW	(Italy) ITA	Stephan El Shaarawy	9	1	1+5	0	0	0	3	1
Other
NN			Own Goals	0	4	0	2	0	0	0	2
Players transferred out during the season
9	FW	(Italy) ITA	Alessandro Matri	18	1	8+7	1	0	0	1+2	0
17	MF	(Ghana) GHA	Kevin-Prince Boateng	2	2	0	0	0	0	2	2
23	MF	(Italy) ITA	Antonio Nocerino	16	0	7+4	0	1+1	0	1+2	0
33	DF	(Colombia) COL	Jherson Vergara	0	0	0	0	0	0	0	0
78	FW	(France) FRA	M'Baye Niang	9	0	1+7	0	0	0	0+1	0

Last updated: 19 May 2014. (Caps & Goals are definitive for this season)
Source: Competitions

=== Discipline ===
N	P	Nat.	Name	Serie A			Champions League			Coppa Italia			Total			Notes
N	P	Nat.	Name	Yellow card	Second yellow card	Red card	Yellow card	Second yellow card	Red card	Yellow card	Second yellow card	Red card	Yellow card	Second yellow card	Red card	Notes
32	GK	(Italy)	Christian Abbiati			1									1	
4	MF	(Ghana)	Sulley Muntari	1		1	1					1	2		2	
10	MF	(Ghana)	Kevin-Prince Boateng				1						1			
17	CB	(Colombia)	Cristián Zapata	2									2			
18	MF	(Italy)	Riccardo Montolivo	1			1						2			
45	FW	(Italy)	Mario Balotelli	1	1		3						4	1		
34	MF	(Netherlands)	Nigel de Jong	4									4			
16	MF	(Italy)	Andrea Poli	2									2			
78	FW	(France)	M'Baye Niang	1									1			
21	LB	(Guinea)	Kévin Constant	1									1			
5	CB	(France)	Philippe Mexès		1									1		

Source: –
Ordered by (red card) , (second yellow card) and (yellow card)
(yellow card) = Number of bookings; (second yellow card) = Number of sending offs after a second yellow card; (red card) = Number of sending offs by a direct red card.

== Transfers (Summer window) ==
In the summer transfer window, Milan sought to continue their campaign of signing younger players. Riccardo Saponara came to the club, returning from his six-month loan to Empoli. Jherson Vergara also arrived, having signed on before the transfer market, just after fellow Colombian defender Cristián Zapata was bought by Milan after a successful loan spell. Another import transfer was midfielder Andrea Poli, purchased from Sampdoria.The main hits come in the final part of summer market, acquiring Alessandro Matri and welcoming back Brazilian star Kaká. Milan parted ways with club legend Massimo Ambrosini, who was released on 30 June 2013 after he was not offered a contract extension. Other departures included Bojan (who returned to his main club Barcelona), Mathieu Flamini (who did not agree to a contract extension), Luca Antonini and, arguably most importantly, Kevin-Prince Boateng, who left just the day after scoring two goals in the 2013–14 UEFA Champions League play-off against PSV, assuring the team's progression to the tournament's group stage.

=== In ===
Date	Pos.	Player	Age	Moving from	Fee	Notes
5 May 2013	DF	(Colombia) Jherson Vergara	18	(Colombia) Universitario Popayán	€2M	Effective from 1 July
24 May 2013	DF	(Colombia) Cristián Zapata	26	(Spain) Villarreal	€6M	Option for full purchase exercised
19 June 2013	MF	(Italy) Marco Bortoli	18	(Italy) Novara	Undiscolsed	Co-ownership solved
19 June 2013	FW	(Italy) Giacomo Beretta	21	(Italy) Pavia	Undisclosed	Co-ownership solved with (Italy) Genoa
20 June 2013	FW	(Italy) Davide Speziale	19	(Italy) Lecce	Undisclosed	Co-ownership solved, then sold
1 July 2013	GK	(Italy) Gianluigi Donnarumma	14	(Italy) Club Napoli	€250,000	Will join AC Milan youth sector
1 July 2013	MF	(Italy) Bryan Cristante	18	(Italy) A.C. Milan Primavera	Promoted from youth	
1 July 2013	MF	(Netherlands) Urby Emanuelson	27	(England) Fulham	Return from Loan	
1 July 2013	FW	(Italy) Andrea Petagna	18	(Italy) A.C. Milan Primavera	Promoted from youth	
1 July 2013	MF	(Italy) Riccardo Saponara	21	(Italy) Empoli	Return from Loan	
4 July 2013	DF	(Italy) Luca Ghiringhelli	21	(Italy) Novara	Undisclosed	Co-Ownership solved
8 July 2013	MF	(Italy) Andrea Poli	23	(Italy) Sampdoria	€3M	Co-ownership
27 July 2013	DF	(Guinea) Kévin Constant	26	(Italy) Genoa	Undisclosed	Option for full purchase exercised
1 August 2013	DF	(Argentina) Matías Silvestre	28	(Italy) Inter	€1M	Loan with option for full purchase
19 August 2013	GK	(Italy) Ferdinando Coppola	35	(Italy) Torino	Free	
30 August 2013	FW	(Italy) Alessandro Matri	29	(Italy) Juventus	€12M	
31 August 2013	MF	(Slovenia) Valter Birsa	27	(Italy) Genoa	Free	Swap for Luca Antonini
2 September 2013	MF	(Brazil) Kaká	31	(Spain) Real Madrid	Free	

=== Out ===
Date	Pos.	Player	Age	Moving to	Fee	Notes
19 June 2013	MF	(Italy) Carlo Calvetti	20	(Italy) Verona	Undisclosed	Co-Ownership solved
20 June 2013	DF	(Italy) Marco Baldan	19	(Italy) Nocerina	Undisclosed	Co-Ownership solved
20 June 2013	DF	(Italy) Matteo Caracciolo	18	(Italy) Sampdoria	End of Loan	
21 June 2013	DF	(Nigeria) Wilfred Osuji	22	(Italy) Padova	No deal on Co-Ownership	
21 June 2013	DF	(Italy) Simone Romagnoli	23	(Italy) Pescara	No deal on Co-Ownership	Will play for (Italy) Carpi
1 July 2013	MF	(Italy) Andrea Peverelli	20	(Italy) Novara	Undisclosed	Co-Ownership solved
1 July 2013	DF	(Italy) Andrea De Vito	21	(Italy) Cittadella	Undisclosed	Co-Ownership solved
1 July 2013	FW	(Spain) Bojan Krkić	22	(Spain) Barcelona	End of Loan	Will play for (Netherlands) Ajax
1 July 2013	DF	(Colombia) Mario Yepes	37	(Italy) Atalanta	Free	
1 July 2013	MF	(Italy) Massimo Ambrosini	36	(Italy) Fiorentina	Free	
29 August 2013	MF	(France) Mathieu Flamini	29	(England) Arsenal	Free	
4 July 2013	DF	(Italy) Luca Ghiringhelli	21	(Italy) Juve Stabia	Undisclosed	
5 July 2013	DF	(Nigeria) Taye Taiwo	28	(Turkey) Bursaspor	Undisclosed	After return from Loan
6 July 2013	GK	(Serbia) Lazar Petković	18	(Italy) Parma	Free	
11 July 2013	MF	(Italy) Pierluigi Bastone	18	(Italy) Sudtirol	Undisclosed	
14 July 2013	FW	(Austria) Philipp Prosenik	20	Unattached	Free	
14 July 2013	FW	(Italy) Gianmarco De Feo	19	(Italy) Lanciano	Free	
14 July 2013	DF	(Portugal) Ricardo Ferreira	20	(Portugal) Olhanense	Undisclosed	After return from Loan
17 July 2013	FW	(Italy) David Speziale	19	(Italy) Verona	Undisclosed	Will play for (Italy) Pavia
18 July 2013	FW	(Slovenia) Uroš Palibrk	19	(Slovenia) Triglav	Free	After return from Loan
19 July 2013	DF	(Italy) Federico Dal Compare	19	(Italy) Castiglione	Free	After return from Loan
27 July 2013	MF	(Sierra Leone) Rodney Strasser	23	(Italy) Genoa	Undisclosed	After return from Loan
2 August 2013	MF	(Spain) Adrià Carmona	21	(Spain) Girona	Undisclosed	After return from Loan
30 August 2013	MF	(Ghana) Kevin-Prince Boateng	26	(Germany) Schalke 04	€12M	
31 August 2013	DF	(Italy) Luca Antonini	31	(Italy) Genoa	Free	Swap for Valter Birsa

=== Out on loan ===
Date	Pos.	Player	Age	Moving to	Fee	Notes
19 June 2013	MF	(Italy) Michelangelo Albertazzi	22	(Italy) Verona	Co-ownership	option to fully purchase
19 June 2013	MF	(Italy) Simone Calvano	19	(Italy) Lanciano	Free	Co-ownership renewed with (Italy) Verona
24 June 2013	FW	(Nigeria) Ezekiel Isoken Henty	20	(Italy) Spezia	Free	
28 June 2013	MF	(Italy) Gianmario Comi	21	(Italy) Novara	Free	Co-ownership renewed with (Italy) Torino
2 July 2013	MF	(Italy) Filippo Lora	19	(Italy) Cittadella	Co-ownership	
8 July 2013	DF	(Italy) Marco Speranza	19	(Italy) Pisa	Free	
10 July 2013	DF	(Italy) (Monaco) Johad Ferretti	19	(Italy) Benevento	Free	dual Monegasque citizenship
11 July 2013	DF	(Poland) Bartosz Salamon	22	(Italy) Sampdoria	€1.7M	Co-ownership
12 July 2013	MF	(Italy) Marco Bortoli	18	(Italy) Bassano	Free	
12 July 2013	DF	(Brazil) Marcus Diniz	25	(Italy) Lecce	Free	Option to fully purchase
12 July 2013	DF	(Italy) (Brazil) Rodrigo Ely	19	(Italy) Varese	Free	After return from loan
14 July 2013	MF	(Italy) Simone Verdi	21	(Italy) Empoli	Free	Co-ownership renewed with (Italy) Torino
14 July 2013	MF	(Portugal) Pelé	21	(Portugal) Olhanense	Free	After return from Loan
15 July 2013	GK	(Italy) Edoardo Pazzagli	24	(Italy) Ascoli	Free	After return from Loan
15 July 2013	MF	(Italy) Luca Bertoni	21	(Italy) Carpi	Co-ownership	After return from Loan
16 July 2013	GK	(Italy) Filippo Perucchini	21	(Italy) Lecce	Co-ownership	After return from Loan
18 July 2013	GK	(Italy) Riccardo Piscitelli	19	(Italy) Benevento	Co-ownership	After return from Loan
22 July 2013	FW	(Italy) Gianmarco Zigoni	22	(Italy) Lecce	Free	After return from Loan
24 July 2013	MF	(Italy) Marco Ezio Fossati	21	(Italy) Bari	Free	After return from Loan
24 July 2013	MF	(Italy) (Argentina) Alessio Innocenti	20	(Italy) Sudtirol	Free	After return from Loan
24 July 2013	FW	(Italy) Giacomo Beretta	21	(Italy) Lecce	Free	
25 July 2013	FW	(Italy) Matteo Chinellato	21	(Italy) Sorrento	Free	After return from Loan
25 July 2013	MF	(Ghana) Edmund Hottor	20	(Italy) Nocerina	Free	After return from Loan
25 July 2013	FW	(Bolivia) Fernando Pontos Paz	18	(Italy) Nocerina	Free	After return from Loan
25 July 2013	DF	(Spain) Dídac Vilà	24	(Spain) Real Betis	Free	
26 July 2013	FW	(Nigeria) Nnamdi Oduamadi	22	(Italy) Brescia	Undisclosed	After return from Loan
26 July 2013	GK	(Italy) Davide Narduzzo	18	(Italy) Teramo	Free	
27 July 2013	MD	(Italy) Mattia Valoti	19	(Italy) Albinoleffe	Co-ownership	Loan renewed
29 July 2013	FW	(Italy) Simone Andrea Ganz	19	(Italy) Lumezzane	Free	
30 July 2013	MD	(Italy) Luca Santonocito	22	(Italy) Monza	Free	After return from Loan
19 August 2013	FW	(Italy) (Ghana) Kingsley Boateng	19	(Italy) Catania	Free	
29 August 2013	MD	(Switzerland) Mattia Desole	20	(Switzerland) Chiasso	Free	After return from loan
31 August 2013	FW	(Italy) Andrea Petagna	18	(Italy) Sampdoria	Free	Option for co-ownership
5 September 2013	MF	(Mali) Bakaye Traoré	28	(Turkey) Kayseri Erciyesspor	Free	

== Transfers (Winter window) ==
Milan 2013–14 winter transfer window began very early as, on 12 October 2013, Adil Rami signed an agreement with Milan to join on a six-month loan at the start of the winter transfer season. It was also confirmed, on 28 October, that Keisuke Honda would join them during the 2014 winter transfer season. Also arriving in the window were African star Michael Essien and Adel Taarabt. Departures from the team included the loan-outs of M'Baye Niang, Antonio Nocerino and Alessandro Matri

=== In ===
Date	Pos.	Player	Age	Moving from	Fee	Notes
12 October 2013	DF	(France) Adil Rami	28	(Spain) Valencia	Undisclosed	Loan with option for full purchase
28 October 2013	MF	(Japan) Keisuke Honda	27	(Russia) CSKA Moscow	Free	
14 January 2014	FW	(Italy) Andrea Petagna	18	(Italy) Sampdoria	Free	Return from loan
27 January 2014	MF	(Ghana) Michael Essien	31	(England) Chelsea	Free	
30 January 2014	MF	(Morocco) Adel Taarabt	24	(England) Fulham	Free	Loan with option for full purchase
31 January 2014	GK	(Italy) Stefano Gori	17	(Italy) Brescia	Undisclosed	Co-Ownership
31 January 2014	DF	(Italy) Daniele Guglielmi	15	(Italy) Barletta	0,4 M€	

=== Out ===
Date	Pos.	Player	Age	Moving to	Fee	Notes

=== Out on loan ===
Date	Pos.	Player	Age	Moving to	Fee	Notes
23 December 2013	FW	(France) M'Baye Niang	18	(France) Montpellier	Undisclosed	Loan with option for full purchase
27 December 2013	DF	(Italy) Christian Maldini	17	(Italy) Brescia	Free	
9 January 2014	FW	(Nigeria) Ezekiel Isoken Henty	20	(Italy) Perugia	Free	After return from loan
14 January 2014	FW	(Italy) Alessandro Matri	29	(Italy) Fiorentina	Free	
22 January 2014	FW	(Italy) Gianmario Comi	21	(Italy) Lanciano	Free	After return from loan
23 January 2014	DF	(Colombia) Jherson Vergara	19	(Italy) Parma	Free	
25 January 2014	MF	(Italy) Antonio Nocerino	28	(England) West Ham United	Free	
31 January 2014	MF	(Morocco) Abdelkerim Medhoun	18	(Italy) Spezia	Free	
31 January 2014	MF	(Italy) (Argentina) Alessio Innocenti	20	(Italy) Barletta	Free	After return from loan
31 January 2014	FW	(Italy) Simone Andrea Ganz	20	(Italy) Barletta	Free	After return from loan
31 January 2014	FW	(Nigeria) Nnamdi Oduamadi	23	(Italy) Varese	Free	After return from loan
31 January 2014	FW	(The Gambia) Yusupha Yaffa	26	(Italy) Bologna	Free	
31 January 2014	DF	(Italy) (Burkina Faso) Raouf Compaore	18	(Italy) Inveruno	Free	
31 January 2014	FW	(Italy) Davide Anelli	17	(Italy) Carpi	Free	

== See also ==
- List of A.C. Milan seasons
