= Lorenzo Ferrari =

Lorenzo Ferrari may refer to:

- Lorenzo Ferrari (footballer)
- Lorenzo Ferrari (racing driver)
