= Marco Speranza =

Italian footballer

Personal information
- Full name: Marco Speranza
- Date of birth: 18 January 1994 (age 32)
- Place of birth: Milan, Italy
- Height: 1.80 m (5 ft 11 in)
- Position: Left back

Team information
- Current team: FC Cologno

Youth career
- –2014: AC Milan

Senior career*
Years	Team	Apps	(Gls)
2013	→ Pisa (loan)	1	(0)
2014–2015	Savona	22	(0)
2016–	FC Cologno		
- * Club domestic league appearances and goals as of 8 June 2018 ‡ National team caps and goals as of 31 January 2014

Marco Speranza is an Italian footballer who plays as a left back for Pisa in the Lega Pro Prima Divisione. He is on loan from AC Milan.
