= Adel Taarabt =

Moroccan association football player (born 1989)

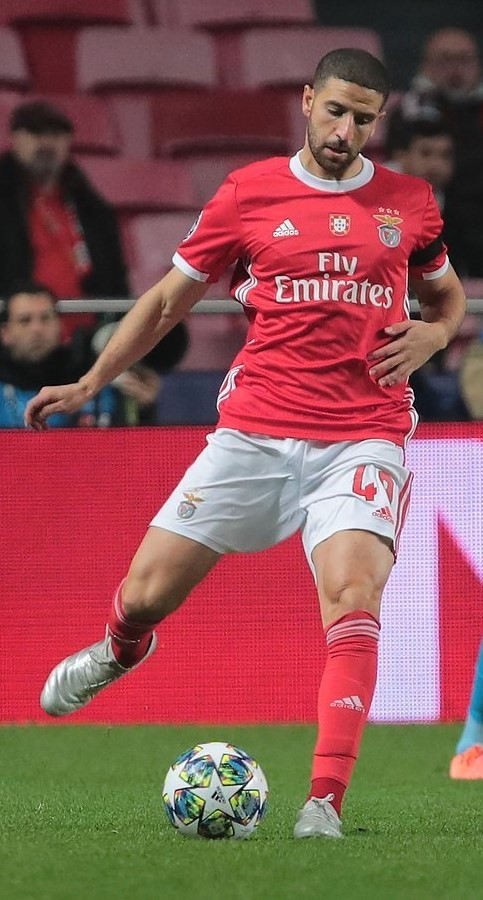
- Taarabt playing for Benfica in 2019

Personal information
- Full name: Adel Taarabt
- Date of birth: 24 May 1989 (age 37)
- Place of birth: Taza, Morocco
- Height: 1.82 m (6 ft 0 in)
- Positions: Attacking midfielder; left winger

Youth career
- 2004–2006: Lens

Senior career*
Years	Team	Apps	(Gls)
2006–2007	Lens	1	(0)
2007	→ Tottenham Hotspur (loan)	2	(0)
2007–2010	Tottenham Hotspur	7	(0)
2009–2010	→ Queens Park Rangers (loan)	48	(8)
2010–2015	Queens Park Rangers	109	(26)
2013–2014	→ Fulham (loan)	12	(0)
2014	→ AC Milan (loan)	14	(4)
2015–2022	Benfica	79	(2)
2017–2018	→ Genoa (loan)	28	(2)
2022–2025	Al-Nasr	55	(21)
2025–2026	Sharjah	13	(1)

International career^{‡}
2006	France U17	3	(2)
2008	France U19	3	(0)
2009–2022	Morocco	30	(4)
- * Club domestic league appearances and goals as of 31 January 2025 ‡ National team caps and goals as of 1 June 2022

Adel Taarabt (Arabic: عادل تاعرابت, romanized: ʿĀdil Tāʿarābt; born 24 May 1989) is a Moroccan former professional footballer who played as an attacking midfielder or winger.

Taarabt began his playing career in France at Lens before moving to English Premier League club Tottenham Hotspur in 2007. Taarabt then moved to Queens Park Rangers on loan in July 2009. He was signed permanently in August 2010 and quickly established himself at Loftus Road. QPR were relegated in 2013 and in the ensuing summer, Taarabt moved to Fulham on loan. After another loan to AC Milan in Italy, Taarabt signed a long-term deal with Primeira Liga club Benfica in 2015, who loaned him out to Italian side Genoa two years later.

Taarabt made his Morocco debut in February 2009, and scored his first international goal the following month. He represented the country at the 2012 Africa Cup of Nations.

== Club career ==
=== Early career ===
Taarabt was born in Taza (Morocco], Morocco. At a young age, his family moved to a small town called Berre-l'Étang, Bouches-du-Rhône, France. He began his career at Lens in 2004, and played 14 matches for RC Lens B in the Championnat de France amateur. He made one first team appearance for Lens during the 2006–07 season.

=== Tottenham Hotspur ===
Still at the age of 17, Taarabt signed for Tottenham Hotspur on a long-term loan on 2 January 2007 after the club offered to integrate him quickly into the first team to offer him maximum playing time. Within two months, he made his first senior appearance in a Spurs shirt, entering as an 87th-minute substitute for Pascal Chimbonda against local rivals West Ham United in a 4–3 away victory on 4 March. On 7 April, he made the only other appearance of his loan, in a 1–0 defeat at another local rival, Chelsea; he replaced Teemu Tainio after 64 minutes.

Tottenham signed Taarabt permanently on 8 June. He scored his first goal for Spurs in a pre-season friendly against Stevenage Borough on 7 July. He made his first of six appearances in the 2007–08 season against Derby County in the 4–0 win on 18 August, entering the 71st minute for Wayne Routledge. He won a crucial free kick, scored by Dimitar Berbatov in a 4–3 win at Upton Park.

At the beginning of the 2008–09 season, Taarabt was among a group of players not given a squad number by then manager Juande Ramos, and also banned from the first-team training ground. He was given his old number when Harry Redknapp took over team management, but his only Premier League appearance that season came in a goalless North London derby on 8 February 2009, playing three minutes in place of Aaron Lennon.

=== Queens Park Rangers ===
On 13 March 2009, Taarabt joined Championship club Queens Park Rangers on loan until the end of the 2008–09 season. He scored his first goal for QPR in a 2–1 win over Bristol City. His loan spell was cut short after he suffered a knee injury which required surgery.

On 23 July 2009, Taarabt rejoined QPR on a season-long loan for the 2009–10 season. On 1 October, Taarabt scored a "wonder strike" in a match against Preston North End. He collected the ball on his chest inside the QPR half, dribbled 20 yards past three players and curled in a shot from 25 yards.

Tottenham confirmed in October 2009 that Taarabt could stay at QPR for the season providing that a Premier League club did not make a bid for him in the January transfer window. QPR were unable to make the transfer permanent because they could not afford the £4.5 million valuation placed on Taarabt by Spurs.

In March 2010, Taarabt was quoted in an interview as being sorry he had signed for Tottenham, saying, "The big mistake was to sign for Tottenham and not go to another club when I first came over." He stated he wished he had signed for Arsenal instead but had opted for Spurs after Damien Comolli moved from being a scout at Arsenal to director of football at Spurs. He said he felt he would have been given more chances to play at Arsenal and was advised at the time not to sign for Spurs by his friends Armand Traoré and Abou Diaby, who played for Arsenal. Taarabt went on to state his intention to sign for one of the top clubs in Spain: "I hope to be playing for one of the top four in Spain next season – Real Madrid, Barcelona, Valencia or Sevilla. I have contact with good teams and I know that they want me. Now I just have to hope they can agree a deal with Tottenham."

On 5 August 2010, Taarabt signed a three-year contract with QPR for an undisclosed fee.

In January 2011, Taarabt was interviewed by the Evening Standard in which he said, "The man who took me to Tottenham was Damien Comolli. He was at Arsenal then. But, when I was going to go to Arsenal, he moved to Tottenham. He told me: 'Come to Tottenham. We want to do like they do at Arsenal and take the best young players in the world. You're going to have a better chance there.' I believed him. This was a mistake and I regret it. Tottenham tried to do it like Arsenal but it's a different culture. I would have had a better chance at Arsenal. I would progress with Arsène Wenger. He is a legend in France, one of the best managers in the world."

==== 2010–11 season ====
Taarabt was to make his debut as a full QPR player, as the club signed the Moroccan for a reported £1 million. The contract stipulated that Tottenham would receive 40% of any future transfer profit, in addition to the payments already made. His move was proved to be one of the bargains of the season as Taarabt scored 19 goals in 44 league appearances that season for the West London club. With his unpredictable skill and reputation for never giving the opposition defence an easy 90 minutes, Taarabt went on to win the Championship Player of the Year award and gained a place in the Championship's best XI, which also featured teammate Paddy Kenny.

In March 2011, Taarabt missed two matches when he returned to France for family matters as one of his cousins had been killed. In the return fixture, Morocco manager Erik Gerets opted to drop Taarabt to the substitutes' bench. Taarabt decided to not turn up to the international fixture and vowed to never play for his country again. However, several months later, Taarabt wanted to play for Morocco again, which Gerets reluctantly allowed, but said that if Taarabt acted irrationally again, he would not play for his country while he was in charge.

Some notable moments during the season were against Cardiff City (an away 2–2 draw), where Taarabt picked up a brace, scoring a wonder goal in the process. During the home match against the same opposition, Taarabt scored the winner which took QPR back to the top of the Championship.

==== 2011–12 season ====
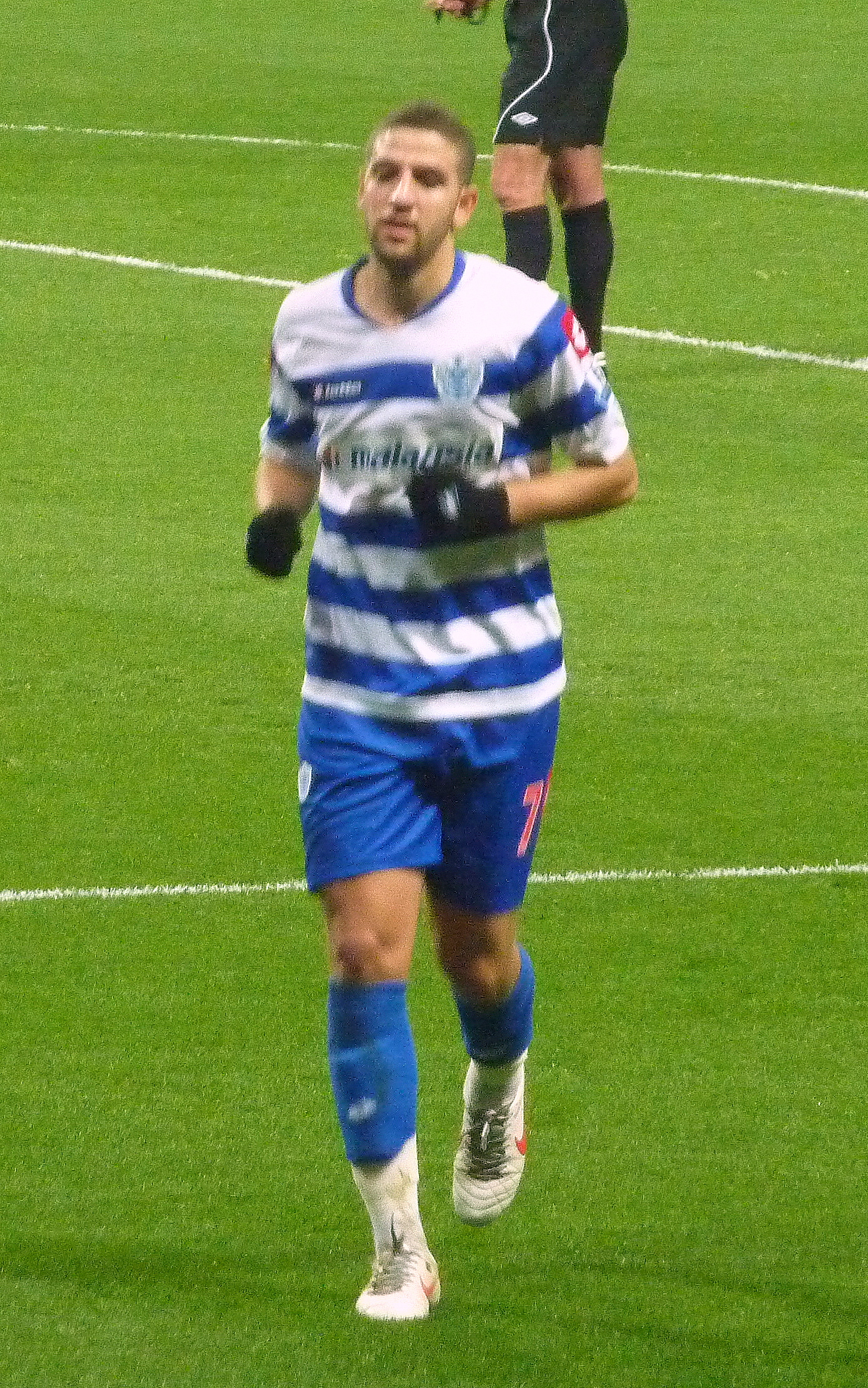
Taarabt playing for Queens Park Rangers in 2011

The 2011–12 season marked Taarabt's first real foray into the Premier League, for although having been featured in English football's highest tier as a Tottenham player, he had never made a breakthrough into the Spurs' starting XI. The start of the season held much optimism for both QPR and Taarabt, yet this soon gave way to speculation that he would move away, and his name was associated with the likes of Paris Saint-Germain and Napoli. This was coupled with the arrival of Joey Barton in the August transfer window, who was immediately installed as captain, taking the role from Taarabt.

These factors had the unfortunate effect of unsettling Taarabt and he was unable to recreate his form from the previous season. By early November, he had taken over 20 shots yet scored zero goals. Prior to this, he had often let his temper get the better of him. During the 6–0 loss away to Fulham on 2 October, he was substituted at half-time. His attitude provoked criticism from his teammates, with Joey Barton being particularly vocal. Taarabt was again substituted at half-time for a poor showing in the 3–1 defeat at Tottenham and was subsequently omitted from the side for the matches against Manchester City and Stoke City. During this period, continued speculation linked him with PSG, and QPR manager Neil Warnock even admitted he would gladly accept an offer for Taarabt if the right one came along. Adel was considered the best Arab player of 2011 for the Argélia Le Buteur newspaper.

Taarabt went on international duty and also had some minor injuries which also saw him left out of the side at this stage. Warnock was highly critical of the player's agents during this period and laid much of the blame for him being unsettled at their feet. He advised him to rethink the advice they had given him and said, "They won't make him better and I think it is a shame. Adel can always make money but he is better than that. I will be sad if he ends up going to make some money because I think he has great ability." Still left out of the side throughout most of November, subsequent injuries to his teammates saw a recall, however, and he was commended for his performance in the 2–0 loss to Manchester United on 18 December. He sustained this level of improved performance against Sunderland and Swansea City. On 31 March, Taarabt scored the first goal in QPR's victory over Arsenal, and was also voted Man of the Match. Taarabt followed up his goal against Arsenal by scoring a long-range free-kick, the winning goal in a victory over his former club Tottenham on 21 April. He was also shown his first red card in English football in the same match for a second bookable offence.

==== 2012–13 season ====
On 11 July 2012, Taarabt signed a new three-year contract with QPR, keeping him at the club until June 2015. On 1 October 2012, he scored his first goal of the season against West Ham United with a dipping long-range shot after dribbling past two players. He scored his second goal in three matches with an emphatic volley away against West Bromwich Albion on 6 October. On 15 December, he scored both goals in QPR's first victory of the 2012–13 season, a 2–1 win over West London rivals Fulham, the second with a mazy dribble ending with a finish on the outside of his foot. Manager Harry Redknapp praised Taarabt by stating, "It was one of the all-time great performances, I felt." On 2 January 2013, in QPR's second win of the season, a 1–0 away victory over rivals Chelsea, Taarabt was played in an unfamiliar striker position, gaining the Man of the Match award and assisting the only goal, described as "Pelé-esque".

=== Fulham (loan) ===
Taarabt joined Premier League side Fulham on a season-long loan on 7 August 2013. He made his Fulham debut in an away match against Sunderland, where he played the full 90 minutes. He scored his first goal for the club against Burton Albion in the League Cup on 27 August 2013.

=== AC Milan (loan) ===
On 30 January 2014, Taarabt signed for AC Milan until the end of the season, demonstrating the Rossoneri's renewed ambition on the transfer market. He scored his first goal for Milan eight minutes into his debut, against Napoli, having tackled the ball in his own half and dribbling halfway across the pitch to score from outside the box in a 3–1 loss. On 19 February, he made his debut in the UEFA Champions League, in the first leg of the round of 16 in a 1–0 loss at the San Siro against Atlético Madrid.

=== Return to QPR ===
In the 2014 summer season, Taarabt returned from his loan spells back to QPR, but after starting in the League Cup match against Burton Albion on 27 August, only came on as a substitute in the away match against West Ham. Responding to a journalist's question, QPR manager Harry Redknapp stated after his team's home defeat against Liverpool, "Taarabt is not injured. He's not fit. He's not fit to play football unfortunately. He played in a reserve game the other day and I could have run about more than he did. I can't pick him." Taarabt responded that Redknapp was "making excuses because QPR are losing games", adding, "[M]aybe he expects me to make more tackles. I am not this type of player."

=== Benfica ===
On 12 June 2015, Taarabt signed a five-year contract with Portuguese champions Benfica on €4 million transfer fee. On 10 January 2017, he joined Italian club Genoa on a loan deal until June 2018.

After seven months with Benfica's reserve team, Taarabt returned to the first-team in February 2019, making his debut on 30 March 2019 as a 71st-minute substitute in a 1–0 home win over Tondela in Primeira Liga.

During the 2019–20 season, Taarabt established himself as a regular starter for Benfica in an unfamiliar defensive midfield position. On 1 September 2022, Benfica announced the termination of his contract.

=== Al-Nasr SC ===
On 25 September 2022, Taarabt joined Emirati club Al-Nasr SC. On 22 January 2025 he left Al-Nasr SC after his contract was ended by mutual consent.

=== Sharjah FC ===
On 27 January 2025, Taarabt joined Emirati club Sharjah.

=== Retirement ===
On 8 September 2026, Taarabt announced his retirement from professional football.

== International career ==
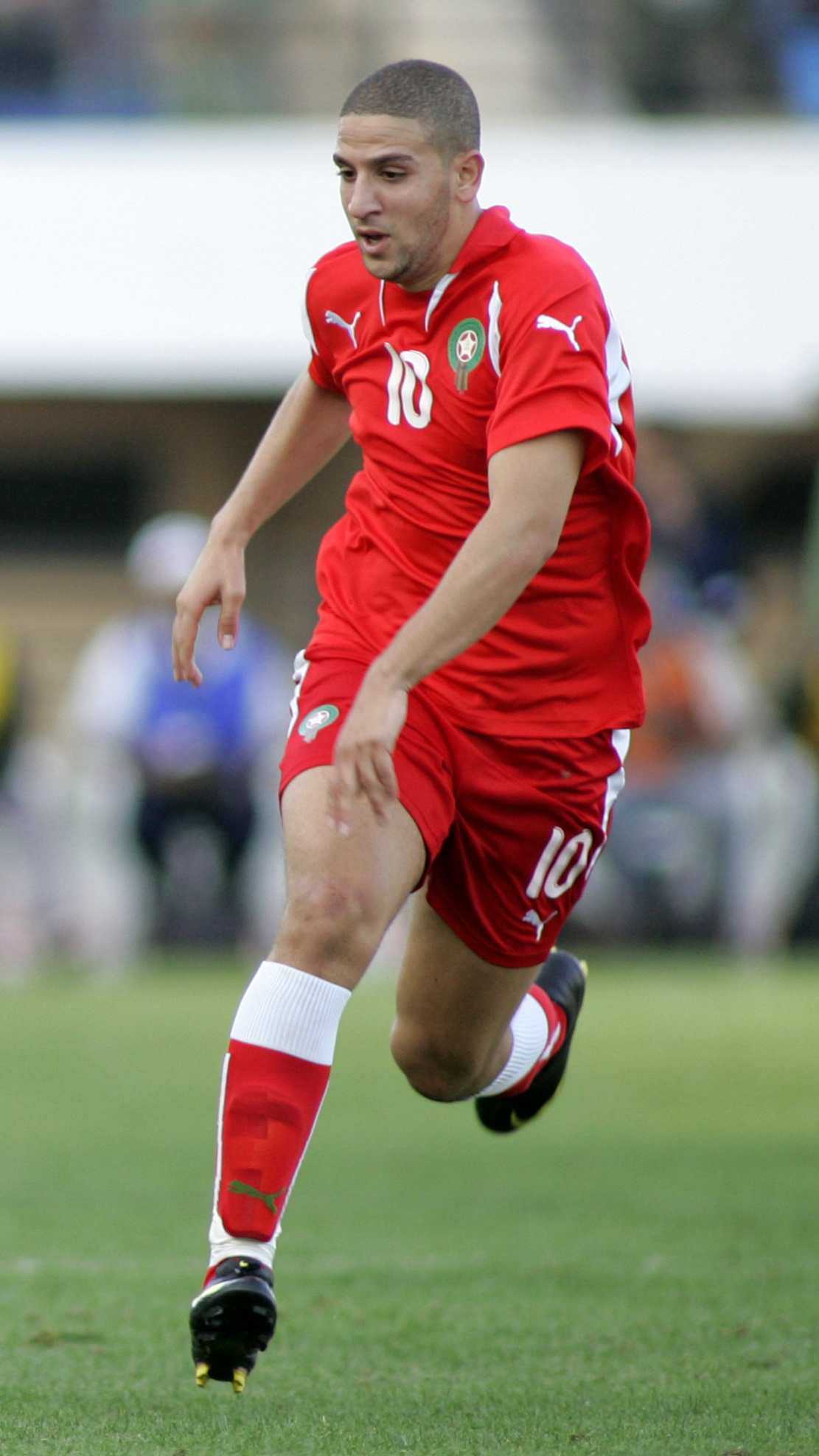
Taarabt playing for Morocco in 2009

Taarabt represented France at under-16, under-17 and under-18 levels, but opted to play for Morocco at senior level, saying, "I felt the time was right when I was given this opportunity". On 11 February 2009, he played his first international match with Morocco in a friendly against Czech Republic in Casablanca. He also made an appearance on 29 March during Morocco's 2010 FIFA World Cup qualifier 2–1 defeat against Gabon.

Taarabt scored his first international goal on his first start on 31 March 2009 in a friendly 2–0 victory over Angola. On 6 September 2009, he scored his first goal in a competitive international match against Togo in the 2010 World Cup qualification after he broke through the opposing defence in stoppage time.

On 3 June 2011, Taarabt decided to end his international career the day after being dropped to the bench for an Africa Cup of Nations qualifier against Algeria. He reneged on that decision, returning on 9 October 2011 for their last qualifier against Tanzania. Taarabt scored a free-kick that would end up being the winning goal and sealing Morocco's qualification. He made two substitute appearances in a group stage exit.

Taarabt was omitted from Morocco's squad for the 2013 Africa Cup of Nations by head coach Rachid Taoussi.

After five years without making an international appearance, Taarabt was recalled to the national squad in September 2019. He made his return as a substitute in a friendly match against Burkina Faso on 6 September. Four days later, he was selected to start against Niger and assisted the only goal of the match for midfield partner Walid El Karti.

== Personal life ==
Taarabt is a Muslim and stated in an interview in June 2010 that this religion has had a significant impact on his life as a footballer:

"Being a Muslim has had a big impact on my professional life. As Muslims, we don't drink alcohol, we don't smoke, so essentially we've become healthier, more professional footballers because of our lifestyle. Before every game, I perform salat. Without it, I just don't feel confident. I make sure I pray after a match, too – to give thanks and be grateful for the stamina and strength God graced me with."

Taarabt credits his parents with keeping his religion in his life, and his father for encouraging him to play professional football.

== Career statistics ==
=== Club ===
As of match played 9 May 2025

Appearances and goals by club, season and competition
Club	Season	League			National cup (Note: Includes Coupe de France, FA Cup, Coppa Italia, Taça de Portugal, UAE President's Cup)		League cup (Note: Includes Coupe de la Ligue, Football League Cup, Taça da Liga, UAE League Cup)		Continental		Other		Total	
Club	Season	Division	Apps	Goals	Apps	Goals	Apps	Goals	Apps	Goals	Apps	Goals	Apps	Goals
Lens	2006–07	Ligue 1	1	0	0	0	0	0	0	0	—		1	0
Tottenham Hotspur (loan)	2006–07	Premier League	2	0	0	0	0	0	0	0	—		2	0
Tottenham Hotspur	2007–08	Premier League	6	0	1	0	0	0	3 (Note: Appearances in UEFA Cup)	0	—		10	0
Tottenham Hotspur	2008–09	Premier League	1	0	1	0	1	0	0	0	—		3	0
Tottenham Hotspur	Total		9	0	2	0	1	0	3	0	—		15	0
Queens Park Rangers (loan)	2008–09	Championship	7	1	0	0	0	0	—		—		7	1
Queens Park Rangers (loan)	2009–10	Championship	41	7	1	0	2	0	—		—		44	7
Queens Park Rangers	2010–11	Championship	44	19	0	0	0	0	—		—		44	19
Queens Park Rangers	2011–12	Premier League	27	2	0	0	1	0	—		—		28	2
Queens Park Rangers	2012–13	Premier League	31	5	2	0	0	0	—		—		33	5
Queens Park Rangers	2014–15	Premier League	7	0	0	0	1	0	—		—		8	0
Queens Park Rangers	Total		157	34	3	0	4	0	—		—		164	34
Fulham (loan)	2013–14	Premier League	12	0	1	0	3	1	—		—		16	1
AC Milan (loan)	2013–14	Serie A	14	4	0	0	—		2 (Note: Appearances in UEFA Champions League)	0	—		16	4
Benfica	2015–16	Primeira Liga	0	0	0	0	0	0	0	0	0	0	0	0
Benfica	2018–19	Primeira Liga	6	0	1	0	0	0	0	0	—		7	0
Benfica	2019–20	Primeira Liga	24	1	5	0	2	0	6 (Note: Four appearances in UEFA Champions League, two appearances in UEFA Europa League)	0	1 (Note: Appearance in Supertaça Cândido de Oliveira)	0	38	1
Benfica	2020–21	Primeira Liga	26	0	6	0	2	0	7 (Note: One appearance in UEFA Champions League, six appearances in UEFA Europa League)	0	1	0	42	0
Benfica	2021–22	Primeira Liga	23	1	3	0	3	0	13	0	—		42	1
Benfica	Total		79	2	15	0	7	0	26	0	2	0	129	2
Benfica B	2015–16	LigaPro	7	1	—		—		—		—		7	1
Benfica B	2018–19	LigaPro	3	0	—		—		—		—		3	0
Benfica B	Total		10	1	—		—		—		—		10	1
Genoa (loan)	2016–17	Serie A	6	0	0	0	—		—		—		6	0
Genoa (loan)	2017–18	Serie A	22	2	1	0	—		—		—		23	2
Genoa (loan)	Total		28	2	1	0	—		—		—		29	2
Al-Nasr	2022–23	UAE Pro League	22	6	2	1	6	4	—		—		30	11
Al-Nasr	2023–24	UAE Pro League	22	8	4	4	3	0	—		—		29	12
Al-Nasr	2024–25	UAE Pro League	11	7	1	0	4	1	—		3 (Note: Appearances in AGCFF Gulf Club Champions League)	3	19	11
Al-Nasr	Total		55	21	7	5	13	5	—		3	3	78	34
Sharjah	2024–25	UAE Pro League	13	1	3	0	2	0	7 (Note: Appearances in AFC Champions League Two)	0	—		25	1
Career total			377	66	32	5	30	5	38	0	5	3	482	79

=== International ===
As of match played 1 June 2022

Appearances and goals by national team and year
National team	Year	Apps	Goals
Morocco	2009	7	3
Morocco	2010	1	0
Morocco	2011	5	1
Morocco	2012	3	0
Morocco	2013	1	0
Morocco	2014	1	0
Morocco	2019	5	0
Morocco	2020	2	0
Morocco	2021	4	0
Morocco	2022	1	0
Morocco	Total	30	4

== Honours ==
Tottenham Hotspur

- Football League Cup: runner-up: 2008–09

Queens Park Rangers

- Football League Championship: 2010–11

Benfica

- Primeira Liga: 2018–19
- Supertaça Cândido de Oliveira: 2019
- Taça de Portugal runner-up: 2019–20, 2020–21

Al-Nasr

- UAE–Qatar Super Cup Series: 2024

Sharjah

- AFC Champions League Two: 2024–25
- UAE–Qatar Super Cup Series 2026

Individual

- PFA Team of the Year: 2010–11 Championship
- EFL Championship Player of the Month: August 2010
- EFL Championship Player of the Year: 2010–11
- EFL Championship Top assist provider: 2010–11
- UAE President's Cup Top scorer: 2023–24
