= Lazar Petković =

Serbian footballer

Personal information
- Date of birth: 17 April 1995 (age 31)
- Place of birth: Novi Sad, FR Yugoslavia
- Height: 1.97 m (6 ft 6 in)
- Position: Goalkeeper

Youth career
- 2006–2009: Vojvodina
- 2009–2013: Milan
- 2013–2014: Parma
- 2014: Spezia

Senior career*
Years	Team	Apps	(Gls)
2014–2016	Padova	42	(0)
2016–2018	Carpi	1	(0)
2017–2018	→ Pisa (loan)	23	(0)
- * Club domestic league appearances and goals as of 28 April 2018

Lazar Petković (born 17 April 1995) is a Serbian retired footballer who played as a goalkeeper.

== Club career ==
Petković was first trained at Vojvodina, and passed through the youth academy of Milan in 2011. Petković made his professional for Carpi in a Serie B tie against Perugia on 26 March 2017. He joined Pisa on loan in summer 2017.
