= Lorenzo Saporetti =

Italian footballer (born 1996)

Personal information
- Date of birth: 19 March 1996 (age 30)
- Place of birth: Forlì, Italy
- Height: 1.87 m (6 ft 2 in)
- Position: Defender

Team information
- Current team: Pistoiese

Youth career
- –2012: Cesena
- 2012–2014: Milan
- 2014–2015: Cesena

Senior career*
Years	Team	Apps	(Gls)
2015–2019	Parma	31	(2)
2018	→ Fermana (loan)	7	(0)
2018–2019	→ Renate (loan)	26	(1)
2019–2020	Catania	5	(0)
2020–2024	Pro Patria	92	(3)
2024–2026	Forlì	51	(2)
2026–	Pistoiese	0	(0)
- * Club domestic league appearances and goals as of 14 July 2026

Lorenzo Saporetti (born 19 March 1996) is an Italian professional footballer who plays as a defender for Serie D club Pistoiese.

== Club career ==
Saporetti made his Serie C debut for Parma on 5 November 2016 in a game against Gubbio.

On 29 August 2019, he signed with Catania.

On 3 September 2020, he moved to Pro Patria.

In July 2026, he signed with Pistoiese.
