= Donald Bende Bende =

Ivorian footballer

Personal information
- Place of birth: Ivory Coast
- Position: Midfielder

Youth career
- –2014: Milan
- 2014: Honvéd

Senior career*
Years	Team	Apps	(Gls)
2014	Honvéd	0	(0)
2017	Saxan	10	(0)
2019	EIF	19	(2)
- * Club domestic league appearances and goals

Donald Bende Bende (born 17 August 1995) is an Ivorian professional footballer who most recently played as a midfielder for EIF.

== Career ==
In 2014, Bende Bene signed for Honvéd in Hungary from the youth academy of Milan, one of Italy's most successful clubs.

In 2016, he trialed for Ringkøbing IF in the Danish third division.

Before the second half of the 2016–17 season, he signed for Moldovan side Saxan.

In July 2017, he trialled with Nea Salamis Famagusta FC of the Cypriot First Division.

Before the 2019 season, Bende Bende signed for EIF in the Finnish second division.
