= Kingsley Boateng =

Italian footballer

Personal information
- Date of birth: 7 April 1994 (age 32)
- Place of birth: Mampong, Ghana
- Height: 1.77 m (5 ft 10 in)
- Position: Winger

Youth career
- 2007–2013: Milan

Senior career*
Years	Team	Apps	(Gls)
2013–2014	Catania	6	(0)
2014–2015	NAC Breda	14	(1)
2015–2017	Bari	37	(3)
2017–2019	Olimpija Ljubljana	22	(4)
2019–2022	Ternana	11	(0)
2019–2020	→ Juve Stabia (loan)	4	(0)
2020	→ Siena (loan)	2	(0)
2020–2022	→ Fermana (loan)	25	(6)

International career
2011–2012	Italy U18	3	(1)
2015	Italy U21	5	(0)
- * Club domestic league appearances and goals as of 11 September 2023

Kingsley Boateng (born 7 April 1994) is a professional footballer who plays as a winger. Born in Ghana, he has represented Italy at youth level.

== Club career ==
Boateng began his professional football career with Milan in 2013, and in the 2013–14 season Boateng was loaned to Catania in Serie A and he made his professional debut for the club in Serie A in a 0–0 draw against Parma at Stadio Angelo Massimino on 22 September 2013.

On 3 July 2014, it was announced that Boateng had signed a three-year deal with Dutch side NAC Breda of the Eredivisie. He signed on a free transfer from Milan.

On 13 January 2015, Boateng was sold to Serie B side Bari.

On 9 January 2017, he moved to Slovenian club Olimpija Ljubljana. In 2018 he won both the Slovenian league and the Slovenian cup with Olimpija.

On 4 February 2019, Boateng signed with Italian club Ternana.

On 24 August 2019, he joined Juve Stabia on loan with an option to purchase. On 31 January 2020, he moved on loan to Siena. On 16 September 2020 he was loaned to Fermana. On 9 July 2021 the loan to Fermana was renewed for the 2021–22 season.

== International career ==
Boateng has been capped by Italy at under-18 level and under-21 level but remains eligible to represent Ghana at senior level.

== Career statistics ==
=== Club ===
As of match played 11 September 2023

Club	Season	League	League		Cup		Continental		Total	
Club	Season	League	Apps	Goals	Apps	Goals	Apps	Goals	Apps	Goals
Catania	2013–14	Serie A	6	0	1	0	—		7	0
NAC Breda	2014–15	Eredivisie	14	1	0	0	—		14	1
Bari	2014–15	Serie B	17	3	0	0	—		17	3
Bari	2015–16	Serie B	18	0	1	0	—		19	0
Bari	2016–17	Serie B	2	0	1	0	—		3	0
Bari	Total		37	3	2	0	—		39	3
Olimpija	2016–17	Slovenian PrvaLiga	8	2	1	0	—		9	2
Olimpija	2017–18	Slovenian PrvaLiga	5	0	2	1	0	0	7	1
Olimpija	2018–19	Slovenian PrvaLiga	9	2	2	2	6 (Note: Two appearances in UEFA Champions League, four appearances and two goals in UEFA Europa League)	2	17	6
Olimpija	Total		22	4	5	3	6	2	33	9
Ternana	2018–19	Serie C	11	0	0	0	—		11	0
Ternana	2019–20	Serie C	0	0	0	0	—		0	0
Ternana	Total		11	0	0	0	0	0	11	0
Juve Stabia (loan)	2019–20	Serie B	4	0	0	0	—		4	0
Siena (loan)	2019–20	Serie C	2	0	0	0	—		2	0
Fermana (loan)	2020–21	Serie C	22	6	0	0	—		22	6
Fermana (loan)	2021–22	Serie C	3	0	0	0	—		3	0
Fermana (loan)	Total		25	6	0	0	—		25	6
Career total			82	8	8	3	6	2	96	13

== Honours ==
=== Club ===
Olimpija Ljubljana

- Slovenian PrvaLiga: 2017–18
- Slovenian Cup: 2017–18
