= Mattia Desole =

Swiss footballer (born 1993)

Personal information
- Date of birth: 10 May 1993 (age 33)
- Place of birth: Zurich, Switzerland
- Height: 1.81 m (5 ft 11 in)
- Position: Left-back

Youth career
- Grasshoppers
- 2008–2010: Inter Milan
- 2010–2012: Milan

Senior career*
| Years | Team | Apps | (Gls) |
| 2012–2014 | Milan | 0 | (0) |
| 2012–2013 | → Monza (loan) | 6 | (0) |
| 2013 | → Foligno (loan) | 4 | (0) |
| 2013–2014 | → Chiasso (loan) | 0 | (0) |
| 2014–2015 | FC Rapperswil-Jona | 24 | (0) |
| 2015–2016 | United Zürich | | |
| 2016–2017 | FC Freienbach | | |

International career^{‡}
| 2008 | Switzerland U15 | 6 | (0) |
| 2008–2009 | Switzerland U16 | 7 | (1) |
| 2009–2010 | Switzerland U17 | 12 | (4) |
| 2010–2011 | Switzerland U18 | | |
| 2011–2012 | Switzerland U19 | 7 | (1) |
- * Club domestic league appearances and goals as of 3 September 2013 ‡ National team caps and goals as of 7 May 2013

Mattia Desole (born 10 May 1993), sometimes spelled De Sole, is a Swiss professional footballer who plays as a left-back. He is the step-brother of fellow footballers Frank and Rolf Feltscher.

== Club career ==
Born in Zürich, Switzerland, Desole moved to Italian club Inter Milan in 2008 playing two seasons for its U17 team. In 2010, he moved to cross-town rival A.C. Milan, for its U20 reserve. In 2012, the league committee changed the age limit of the reserve to U19, and Desole left Milan for nearby Lombard club A.C. Monza Brianza 1912 on loan. During the January transfer window he joined Foligno on another loan spell. The following season, he moved back to his native Switzerland, joining Chiasso on another loan.

== International career ==
Desole was a member of Swiss national youth teams from 2008 to 2012. Desole is eligible to represent Switzerland or Italy as he also holds an Italian passport.

== Personal life ==
He is the step-brother of Frank and Rolf Feltscher. Zaida (nee Martínez) Feltscher divorced in 2001 and remarried Paolo Desole, Mattia's father. Mattia has another biological sibling, Paolo's first son Davide.
