= Alessio Innocenti =

Argentine footballer (born 1993)

Personal information
- Full name: Alessio Innocenti
- Date of birth: 4 February 1993 (age 33)
- Place of birth: Buenos Aires, Argentina
- Height: 1.80 m (5 ft 11 in)
- Position: Central midfielder

Team information
- Current team: F.C. Cinisello

Youth career
- 2005–2006: CA Lanús
- 2006–2007: Acqui
- 2007–2012: AC Milan

Senior career*
Years	Team	Apps	(Gls)
2012–2015	AC Milan	0	(0)
2012	→ Pro Vercelli (loan)	4	(1)
2013	→ Estudiantes (loan)	1	(0)
2013–2014	→ Südtirol (loan)	3	(0)
2014	→ Barletta (loan)	10	(1)
2014–2015	→ Gorica (loan)	23	(2)
2015–2016	AS Melfi	1	(0)
2016–2017	Folgore Caratese	27	(2)
2017–2018	Vimercatese Oreno	21	(2)
2018–2019	Zingonia Verdellino	28	(5)
2019–2020	USD Mariano Calcio	23	(5)
2021–2022	F.C Cinisello	35	(9)
2022–2023	F.C Cinisello	27	(7)
2023–2024	F.C Cinisello	25	(10)
- * Club domestic league appearances and goals as of 20 June 2015

Alessio Innocenti (born 4 February 1993) is an Argentine professional footballer who plays for F.C. Cinisello.

The central midfielder played previously for Argentine side Estudiantes La Plata and the Italian clubs Pro Vercelli, Barletta in the Lega Pro Prima Divisione and Südtirol on loan from AC Milan.
