= Johad Ferretti =

Italian footballer (born 1994)

Personal information
- Date of birth: 30 May 1994 (age 32)
- Place of birth: Marseille, France
- Height: 1.83 m (6 ft 0 in)
- Position: Defender

Team information
- Current team: Rieti

Youth career
- Marseille
- –2012: Genoa
- 2012: → Novara (loan)
- 2012–2013: AC Milan

Senior career*
Years	Team	Apps	(Gls)
2013–2015	AC Milan	0	(0)
2013–2014	→ Benevento (loan)	9	(0)
2014–2015	→ SPAL (loan)	12	(1)
2015	→ Matera (loan)	15	(0)
2016	AlbinoLeffe	17	(0)
2016–2017	Cremonese	17	(1)
2017–2018	Ternana	11	(0)
2018–2019	Teramo	0	(0)
2019	Lucchese	0	(0)
2019	Gubbio	8	(0)
2021	Turris	9	(0)
2021	Sestri Levante	5	(0)
2022	Formia	8	(0)
2022–2023	Ragusa	10	(0)
2023	Akragas	?	(?)
2023	Molfetta	?	(?)
2023–2024	Tivoli	?	(?)
2024-	Rieti	0	(0)

International career
2012–2013	Italy U19	2	(0)
2013	Italy U20	5	(0)
- * Club domestic league appearances and goals as of 6 January 2024

Johad Ferretti (born 30 May 1994) is an Italian professional footballer who plays for Eccellenza club Rieti.

== Club career ==
=== Genoa ===
Born in Marseille, France to Italian parents, Ferretti started his career at France, and then returned to his native country for Genoa. He was a member of age-specific under-17 team in 2010–11 season, in National "Allievi" League. On 4 January 2012 Ferretti and Andrea Caracciolo were signed by Novara's youth system and first team on temporary deals respectively. Ferretti made his Campionato Nazionale Primavera debut in 2012–13 season for Genoa's youth team. He was booked in that match.

=== AC Milan ===
On 31 August 2012 he was signed by AC Milan, in a cashless swap with goalkeeper Antonio Donnarumma. Both players were valued for €1.8 million transfer fee. Ferretti spent a season with the youth team before he leaving Milan in temporary deals.

On 11 July 2013 he was signed by Benevento. In 2014, he was signed by SPAL. On 10 January 2015 he was signed by Matera.

=== AlbinoLeffe ===
On 11 January 2016 Ferretti was signed by AlbinoLeffe.

=== Cremonese ===
On 1 October 2016 Ferretti was signed by Cremonese.

=== Ternana ===
On 2 August 2017 Ferretti joined Ternana on a two-year contract.

=== Serie C ===
On 8 July 2018 Ferretti joined Teramo. On 31 January 2019 he joined Lucchese until the end of the 2018–19 season. For undisclosed reasons, he was not registered for Lucchese and on 26 February 2019 he signed with Gubbio instead.

After 1.5 years without a club, on 16 February 2021 he signed with Turris.

== International career ==
Ferretti was a member of Italy national under-19 football team. He also played for the U19 team at 2013 Mediterranean Games. However the team de facto an under-20 team in June 2013, as born 1994 was eliminated from the final round of 2012–13 season and ineligible to 2013–14 edition.
