= Lorenzo Ferrari (footballer) =

Italian footballer

Personal information
- Date of birth: 9 March 1996 (age 30)
- Place of birth: Cremona, Italy
- Height: 1.93 m (6 ft 4 in)
- Position: Goalkeeper

Team information
- Current team: Crema

Youth career
- Cremonese
- Milan

Senior career*
| Years | Team | Apps | (Gls) |
| 2013–2014 | Milan | 0 | (0) |
| 2014–2019 | Verona | 1 | (0) |
| 2015–2016 | → Rimini (loan) | 8 | (0) |
| 2017–2018 | → Arezzo (loan) | 5 | (0) |
| 2019–2020 | Siena | 0 | (0) |
| 2020–2021 | Legnano | 2 | (0) |
| 2021–2022 | Tritium | 5 | (0) |
| 2023 | Crema | 0 | (0) |
| 2024–2025 | Atletico Castegnato | | |
| 2026– | Crema | 1 | (0) |

International career
| 2011–2012 | Italy U-16 | 8 | (0) |
| 2012 | Italy U-17 | 6 | (0) |
| 2016 | Italy U-21 | 1 | (0) |
- * Club domestic league appearances and goals as of 1 March 2026

Lorenzo Ferrari (born 9 March 1996) is an Italian football player who plays for Serie D club Crema.

== Club career ==
He made his professional debut in the Lega Pro for Rimini on 5 March 2016 in a game against Pisa.

On 13 July 2019, he joined Siena on a one-year contract.

== International ==
He represented Italy national under-17 football team at the 2013 FIFA U-17 World Cup.
