= 2012–13 Bologna FC 1909 season =

Bologna
2012–13 season
- President: Albano Guaraldi
- Manager: Stefano Pioli
- Stadium: Stadio Renato Dall'Ara
- Serie A: 13th
- Coppa Italia: Quarter-finals
- Top goalscorer: League: Alberto Gilardino (13); All: Alberto Gilardino (13)
- Highest home attendance: 22,491
- Lowest home attendance: 5,021
Home colours	Away colours	Third colours

Bologna Football Club 1909 will take part of the 2012–13 season in the Italian Serie A. They will also take part in the Coppa Italia. This will be fifth consecutive season in the top flight of Italian football for Bologna.

== Kit ==
Home	Home Alt.	Away	Away Alt.	Third

== Overview ==
=== Key Dates ===
2012

- 4 May: Marco Di Vaio has announced that he will be leaving Bologna at the end of the season and confirmed that he is considering joining MLS outfit Montreal Impact.

=== Team Kit ===
The kits for the 2012–13 season were made by the local Bolognese sportswear manufacture Macron, kit sponsor of Bologna since 2001. The kits were unveiled on 26 July, in the town of Andalo, the site of Bologna's preseason preparations. The home uniforms feature the classic red and blue stripes, and both the white way kit and anthracite third kit featuring blue and red trim around the collar. All shirts will feature the renewed sponsorship deals with NGM Mobile and Serenissima Ceramica.

== Transfer window ==
=== In ===
Date	Pos.	Nat.	Name	Age	Moving From	Transfer fee	Type of Transfer	Transfer Window	Source
6 June 2012	MF	(Spain)	Martí Riverola	21	(Spain) Barcelona B	Free	Transfer	Summer	bolognafc.it
19 June 2012	ST	(Italy)	Robert Acquafresca	24	Genoa	€2,500,000	Transfer	Summer	calciomercato.it
22 June 2012	MF	(France)	Saphir Taïder	20	Juventus	Undisclosed	Co-ownership Resolution	Summer	bolognafc.it
23 June 2012	FW	(Italy)	Alessandro Diamanti	29	Empoli	€3,400,000	Co-ownership Resolution	Summer	bolognafc.it
2 July 2012	FW	(Italy)	Cristian Pasquato	22	Udinese	Undisclosed	Loan	Summer	bolognafc.it
16 July 2012	GK	(Italy)	Gianluca Curci	27	Roma	Undisclosed	Loan	Summer	bolognafc.it
17 July 2012	CB	(Brazil)	Roger Carvalho	25	(Brazil) Tombense	€300,000	Loan	Summer	bolognafc.it
19 July 2012	LB	(Uruguay)	Mathías Abero	22	(Uruguay) Nacional	€300,000	Transfer	Summer	bolognafc.it
19 July 2012	RB	(Italy)	Marco Motta	26	Juventus	Undisclosed	Loan	Summer	bolognafc.it
25 July 2012	MF	(Italy)	Tiberio Guarente	26	(Spain) Sevilla	Free	Loan	Summer	bolognafc.it
25 July 2012	CB	(Italy)	Cesare Natali	33	Fiorentina	Free	Transfer	Summer	bolognafc.it
18 August 2012	CB	(Serbia)	Uroš Radaković	18	(Serbia) Proleter Novi Sad	€260,000	Transfer	Summer	bolognafc.it
24 August 2012	ST	(Italy)	Manolo Gabbiadini	20	Juventus	Free	Loan	Summer	bolognafc.it
30 August 2012	MF	(Italy)	Michele Pazienza	30	Juventus	€500,000	Transfer	Summer	bolognafc.it
31 August 2012	ST	(Italy)	Alberto Gilardino	30	Genoa	€1,500,000	Loan	Summer	bolognafc.it
31 August 2012	MF	(Greece)	Panagiotis Kone	25	Brescia	€1,000,000	Co-ownership	Summer	bolognafc.it
29 January 2013	DF	(Brazil)	Naldo	24	(Spain) Granada	Undisclosed	Loan	Winter	bolognafc.it
30 January 2013	FW	(Italy)	Davide Moscardelli	33	Chievo	Undisclosed	Transfer	Winter	bolognafc.it
30 January 2013	MF	(Greece)	Lazaros Christodoulopoulos	26	(Greece) Panathinaikos	Undisclosed	Transfer	Winter	bolognafc.it

Total Spending: ▼€9,760,000

=== Out ===
Date	Pos.	Nat.	Name	Age	Moving To	Transfer fee	Type of Transfer	Transfer Window	Source
21 May 2012	CB	(Italy)	Andrea Raggi	27	(France) Monaco	Free	Transfer	Summer	asm-fc.com/
24 May 2012	ST	(Italy)	Marco Di Vaio	35	(Canada) Montreal Impact	Free	Transfer	Summer	impactmontreal.com/
2 July 2012	ST	(Italy)	Marco Bernacci	28	Unattached	N/A	Contract Termination	Summer	bolognafc.it
5 July 2012	GK	(Belgium)	Jean-François Gillet	33	Torino	€1,800,000	Transfer	Summer	bolognafc.it
12 July 2012	DF	(Spain)	José Ángel Crespo	25	Hellas Verona	Undisclosed	Loan	Summer	bolognafc.it
12 July 2012	DF	(Italy)	Angelo Gregorio	21	Pontedera	Undisclosed	Loan	Summer	bolognafc.it
12 July 2012	DF	(United States)	Giuseppe Nazzani	22	Giacomense	Undisclosed	Loan	Summer	bolognafc.it
12 July 2012	DF	(Italy)	Andrea Ingegneri	20	Foligno	Undisclosed	Loan	Summer	bolognafc.it
20 July 2012	MF	(Belgium)	Gaby Mudingayi	30	Internazionale	€750,000	Loan	Summer	bolognafc.it
20 July 2012	FW	(Spain)	Manuel Gavilán	21	Nocerina	Undisclosed	Loan	Summer	bolognafc.it
26 July 2012	FW	(Italy)	Riccardo Pasi	21	Südtirol	Undisclosed	Loan	Summer	bolognafc.it
26 July 2012	LB	(Spain)	Juan Cruz	19	Carrarese	Undisclosed	Loan	Summer	bolognafc.it
31 August 2012	MF	(Italy)	Federico Casarini	23	Cagliari	Undisclosed	Loan	Summer	bolognafc.it
31 August 2012	MF	(Italy)	Alessandro Marchi	23	Frosinone	Undisclosed	Loan	Summer	bolognafc.it
31 August 2012	FW	(Italy)	Massimo Coda	23	San Marino	Undisclosed	Transfer	Summer	bolognafc.it
31 August 2012	AM	(Italy)	Nicola Capellini	21	San Marino	Undisclosed	Loan	Summer	bolognafc.it
31 August 2012	AM	(Uruguay)	Gastón Ramírez	21	(England) Southampton	€15,200,000	Transfer	Summer	bolognafc.it
2 January 2013	FW	(Italy)	Andrea Pisanu	31	(Canada) Montreal Impact	Undisclosed	Loan	Winter	bolognafc.it
15 January 2013	FW	(Uruguay)	Federico Rodríguez	22	(Uruguay) Montevideo Wanderers	Undisclosed	Loan	Winter	bolognafc.it
29 January 2013	DF	(Italy)	Daniele Portanova	34	Genoa	Undisclosed	Transfer	Winter	sportemotori.blogosphere.it
30 January 2013	FW	(Italy)	Robert Acquafresca	25	(Spain) Levante	Undisclosed	Loan	Winter	bolognafc.it
30 January 2013	MF	(Uruguay)	Henry Giménez	27	Grosseto	Undisclosed	Loan	Winter	bolognafc.it

Total Income: ▲€17,750,000

Net Income: ▲€7,990,000

== Squad ==
=== First team ===
No.	Name	Nationality	Position	Date of birth (age)	Signed from	Notes
Goalkeepers
1	Gianluca Curci	(Italy)	GK	12 July 1985 (age 41)	Roma	on loan from Roma
22	Filippo Lombardi	(Italy)	GK	22 April 1990 (age 36)	Alma Fano	
25	Federico Agliardi	(Italy)	GK	11 February 1983 (age 43)	Padova	
32	Dejan Stojanović	(North Macedonia)	GK	19 July 1993 (age 33)	(Austria) Lustenau	
Defenders
3	Archimede Morleo	(Italy)	LB	26 September 1983 (age 43)	Crotone	
5	Mikael Antonsson	(Sweden)	CB	31 May 1981 (age 45)	(Denmark) Copenhagen	
8	György Garics	(Austria)	RB	6 March 1984 (age 42)	Atalanta	
11	Marco Motta	(Italy)	RB	14 May 1986 (age 40)	Juventus	on loan from Juventus
14	Cesare Rickler	(Italy)	CB	5 April 1979 (age 47)	Fiorentina	
19	Mathías Abero	(Uruguay)	LB	9 April 1990 (age 36)	(Uruguay) Nacional	
21	Nicolò Cherubin	(Italy)	LB	2 December 1986 (age 39)	Cittadella	
43	Frederik Sørensen	(Denmark)	CB	14 April 1992 (age 34)	Juventus	
45	Roger Carvalho	(Brazil)	CB	10 December 1986 (age 39)	(Brazil) Tombense	on loan from Tombense
90	Daniele Portanova	(Italy)	CB	17 December 1978 (age 47)	Siena	Captain
Midfielders
4	Rene Krhin	(Slovenia)	CM	21 May 1990 (age 36)	Internazionale	
6	Saphir Taïder	(France)	MF	29 February 1992 (age 34)	(France) Grenoble	
12	Andrea Pisanu	(Italy)	AM	7 January 1982 (age 44)	Parma	
13	Nico Pulzetti	(Italy)	DM	13 February 1984 (age 42)	Livorno	
15	Diego Pérez	(Uruguay)	DM	18 May 1980 (age 46)	(France) Monaco	
17	Tiberio Guarente	(Italy)	CM	1 November 1985 (age 41)	(Spain) Sevilla	on loan from Sevilla
28	Martí Riverola	(Spain)	CM	26 January 1991 (age 35)	(Spain) Barcelona	
30	Michele Pazienza	(Italy)	CM	5 August 1982 (age 44)	Juventus	
33	Panagiotis Kone	(Greece)	MF	26 July 1987 (age 39)	Brescia	
Forwards
7	Henry Giménez	(Uruguay)	ST	13 March 1986 (age 40)	(Uruguay) River Plate	
9	Robert Acquafresca	(Italy)	ST	11 September 1987 (age 39)	Genoa	
10	Alberto Gilardino	(Italy)	ST	5 July 1982 (age 44)	Genoa	on loan from Genoa
18	Manolo Gabbiadini	(Italy)	ST	26 November 1991 (age 34)	Juventus	on loan from Juventus
19	Federico Rodríguez	(Uruguay)	ST	3 April 1991 (age 35)	Genoa	
23	Alessandro Diamanti	(Italy)	FW	2 May 1983 (age 43)	Brescia	
24	Daniele Paponi	(Italy)	ST	16 April 1988 (age 38)	Parma	
77	Cristian Pasquato	(Italy)	FW	20 July 1989 (age 37)	Udinese	on loan from Udinese
Players transferred during the season
16	Federico Casarini	(Italy)	CM	7 August 1989 (age 37)	Youth team	on loan to Cagliari
88	Massimo Coda	(Italy)	ST	10 November 1988 (age 38)	Treviso	sold to San Marino

==== Out on loan ====
Note: Flags indicate national team as defined under FIFA eligibility rules; some limited exceptions apply. Players may hold more than one non-FIFA nationality.

No.	Pos.	Nation	Player
—	GK	ITA	Giacomo Venturi (at Gubbio)
—	DF	ESP	José Ángel Crespo (at Hellas Verona)
—	DF	ITA	Kadir Caidi (at Giacomense)
—	DF	ESP	Juan Cruz (at Carrarese)
—	DF	ITA	Angelo Gregorio (at Pontedera)
—	DF	ITA	Andrea Ingegneri (at Foligno)
—	DF	ITA	Giuseppe Nazzani (at Giacomense)

No.	Pos.	Nation	Player
—	DF	ITA	Matteo Boccaccini (at Fano)
—	MF	ITA	Nicola Capellini (at San Marino)
—	MF	ITA	Federico Casarini (at Cagliari)
—	MF	ITA	Alessandro Marchi (at Frosinone)
—	MF	BEL	Gaby Mudingayi (at Internazionale)
—	FW	ESP	Manuel Gavilán (at Nocerina)
—	FW	ITA	Riccardo Pasi (at Südtirol)

== Pre-season and friendlies ==
20 July 2012 Friendly	Bologna A (Italy)	1–2	(Italy) Bologna B	Andalo
17:00 CEST (UTC+02)	Motta 70'		Pasquato 18'; Pisanu 26'	Stadium: Stadio Comunale di Andalo; Referee: Pedretti

23 July 2012 Friendly	Bologna (Italy)	5–0	(Italy) Garibaldina	Andalo
17:00 CEST (UTC+02)	Taïder 7', 19', 39'; Pasquato 17'; Giménez 27'			Stadium: Stadio Comunale di Andalo; Referee: Sartori
Note: 45 min. only

23 July 2012 Friendly	Mezzolombardo (Italy)	0–4	(Italy) Bologna	Andalo
18:00 CEST (UTC+02)			Coda 14', 22'; Pulzetti 26'; Sørensen 29'	Stadium: Stadio Comunale di Andalo; Referee: Sartori
Note: 45 min. only

27 July 2012 Friendly	Grosseto (Italy)	0–2	(Italy) Bologna	Andalo
17:00 CEST (UTC+02)			Odobo 36'; Curiale 84'	Stadium: Stadio Comunale di Andalo; Referee: Rossi

2 August 2012 Friendly	Bologna (Italy)	4–0	(Italy) Viareggio	Sestola
17:00 CEST (UTC+02)	Garics 6'; Guarente 42'; Sørensen 68'; Motta 90'			Stadium: Stadio Comunale di Sestola; Referee: Rizzoli

4 August 2012 Friendly	Bologna (Italy)	7–1	(Italy) Mezzolara	Sestola
17:00 CEST (UTC+02)	Carvalho 8', 20'; Casarini 59'; Paponi 66' (pen.), 68', 77'; Morleo 80'		Buscarini 37'	Stadium: Stadio Comunale di Sestola; Referee: Prontera

5 August 2012 Friendly	Bologna (Italy)	3–1	(Italy) Giacomense	Sestola
17:00 CEST (UTC+02)	Ramírez 46', 56'; Acquafresca 71'		Caddeo 29'	Stadium: Stadio Comunale di Sestola; Referee: Pirriatore

8 August 2012 Friendly	Istra 1961 (Croatia)	3–1	(Italy) Bologna	Novigrad
19:00 CEST (UTC+02)	Bačelić-Grgić 10' (pen.); Sharbini 29'; Tanković 87'		Acquafresca 61'	Stadium: Lako stadium Referee: Vidulin

11 August 2012 Friendly	NK Novigrad (Croatia)	0–1	(Italy) Bologna	Novigrad
17:00 CEST (UTC+02)			Guarente 58'	Stadium: Lako stadium Referee: Vidulin

15 August 2012 Friendly	Sassuolo (Italy)	2–1	(Italy) Bologna	Sassuolo
20:30 CEST (UTC+02)	Falcinelli 42'; Missiroli 85'		Rodríguez 72'	Stadium: Stadio Enzo Ricci; Referee: Merchiori

9 September 2012 Friendly	Bologna (Italy)	3–0	(Slovenia) NK Triglav	Bologna
15:00 CEST (UTC+02)	Taïder 8'; Gilardino 24', 61' (pen.)	Report		Stadium: Stadio Renato Dall'Ara; Referee: Roskar

11 October 2012 Friendly	Cittadella (Italy)	3–3 (5–3 p)	(Italy) Bologna	Cittadella
20:00 CEST (UTC+02)	Pasquato 47'; Riverola 52' (pen.); Pulzetti 87'	Report	Bellazzini 6', 56' (pen.); Giannetti 63'	Stadium: Stadio Pier Cesare Tombolato; Referee: Tommasi
	Penalties
	Maah (penalty scored); Biraghi (penalty scored); Di Carmine (penalty scored); Ciancio (penalty scored); Di Roberto (penalty scored)		(penalty scored) Paponi; (penalty scored) Riverola; (penalty scored) Morleo; (penalty missed) Rodríguez

13 October 2012 Friendly	Reggiana (Italy)	1–1	(Italy) Bologna	Reggio Emilia
15:00 CEST (UTC+02)	Rossi 58'	Report	Taïder 36'	Stadium: Stadio Città del Tricolore

8 November 2012 Friendly	Bologna (Italy)	1–0	(Canada) Montreal Impact	Bologna
18:30 CET (UTC+01)	Paponi 24'	Report		Stadium: Stadio Renato Dall'Ara; Referee: Pairetto

== Competitions ==
=== Serie A ===
==== League table ====
Pos	Team	Pld	W	D	L	GF	GA	GD	Pts
11	Cagliari	38	12	11	15	43	55	−12	47
12	Chievo	38	12	9	17	37	52	−15	45
13	Bologna	38	11	11	16	46	52	−6	44
14	Sampdoria	38	11	10	17	43	51	−8	42 (Note: Sampdoria and Torino were docked 1 point due to involvement in the 2011–12 Italian football scandal.)
15	Atalanta	38	11	9	18	39	56	−17	40 (Note: Atalanta was docked 2 points due to involvement in the 2011–12 Italian football scandal.)

Source: Serie A, Soccerway
Rules for classification: 1st points; 2nd head-to-head points; 3rd head-to-head goal difference; 4th goal difference; 5th number of goals scored; 6th public draw.
(Head-to-head record is applied for clubs with the same number of points only once all matches between said clubs have been played)

==== Results summary ====
Overall								Home						Away					
Pld	W	D	L	GF	GA	GD	Pts	W	D	L	GF	GA	GD	W	D	L	GF	GA	GD
38	11	11	16	46	52	−6	44	6	8	5	30	24	+6	5	3	11	16	28	−12

Last updated: 19 May 2013.
Source: Competitive matches

==== Results by round ====
Round	1	2	3	4	5	6	7	8	9	10	11	12	13	14	15	16	17	18	19	20	21	22	23	24	25	26	27	28	29	30	31	32	33	34	35	36	37	38
Ground	A	H	A	H	A	H	A	A	H	A	H	A	H	A	H	H	A	H	A	H	A	H	A	H	A	H	H	A	H	A	H	A	H	A	A	H	A	H
Result	L	L	W	D	L	W	L	L	L	L	D	L	W	L	W	D	W	L	L	W	L	D	W	D	L	W	W	W	L	D	D	D	D	D	L	L	W	D
Position	16	18	15	15	16	13	13	17	18	20	19	20	16	19	17	17	13	14	16	15	15	15	15	15	17	14	12	11	12	13	13	13	12	12	13	15	13	13

Updated to match(es) played on 19 May 2013. Source: Competitive matches
A = Away; H = Home; W = Win; D = Draw; L = Loss

==== Matches ====
26 August 2012 1	Chievo	2–0	Bologna	Verona
20:45 CEST (UTC+02:00)	Hetemaj (yellow card) 31'; Théréau (yellow card) 45'; Pellissier 65'; Cruzado 79'; Sardo (yellow card) 82'	Report	Antonsson (yellow card) 33'; Diamanti (yellow card) 77'; Taïder (yellow card) 78'; Pérez (red card) 87'	Stadium: Stadio Marc'Antonio Bentegodi; Attendance: 11,000; Referee: Gianpaolo Calvarese

1 September 2012 2	Bologna	1–3	Milan	Bologna
20:45 CEST (UTC+02:00)	Cherubin (yellow card) 15'; Diamanti 42' (pen.)	Report	Pazzini 16' (pen.), 77', 85', (yellow card) 59'; Montolivo (yellow card) 18'; Bonera (yellow card) 24'; Ambrosini (yellow card) 28'; De Jong (yellow card) 68'	Stadium: Stadio Renato Dall'Ara; Attendance: 22,202; Referee: Paolo Tagliavento

16 September 2012 3	Roma	2–3	Bologna	Rome
15:00 CEST (UTC+02:00)	Florenzi 6'; Lamela 16'; Pjanić (yellow card) 26'; Tachtsidis (yellow card) 31'; Castán (yellow card) 36'; Balzaretti (yellow card) 52'; Totti (yellow card) 87'	Report	Pérez (yellow card) 17'; Morleo (yellow card) 68'; Gilardino 71', 90+1'; Diamanti 73', (yellow card) 88'	Stadium: Stadio Olimpico; Attendance: 37,000; Referee: Marco Guida

23 September 2012 4	Bologna	1–1	Pescara	Bologna
15:00 CEST (UTC+02:00)	Gilardino 6'; Kone (yellow card) 59'	Report	Quintero 40', (yellow card) 66'; Cascione (yellow card) 53'; Perin (red card) 63'; Bjarnason (yellow card) 90+3'	Stadium: Stadio Renato Dall'Ara; Attendance: 22,491; Referee: Andrea Romeo

27 September 2012 5	Siena	1–0	Bologna	Siena
20:45 CEST (UTC+02:00)	Ângelo (yellow card) 25'; Rodríguez (yellow card) 57'; Calaiò 61'; Felipe (yellow card) 75'; Zé Eduardo (yellow card) 80'	Report	Natali (yellow card) 60'; Gabbiadini (yellow card) 85'	Stadium: Stadio Artemio Franchi – Montepaschi Arena; Attendance: 8,180; Referee: Andrea Gervasoni

30 September 2012 6	Bologna	4–0	Catania	Bologna
15:00 CEST (UTC+02:00)	Guarente 19'; Diamanti (yellow card) 26'; Gilardino 40', 61'; Kone 90+5'	Report	Legrottaglie (yellow card) 45'; Izco (yellow card) 71'; Capuano (red card) 83'	Stadium: Stadio Renato Dall'Ara; Attendance: 19,000; Referee: Piero Giacomelli

7 October 2012 7	Fiorentina	1–0	Bologna	Florence
15:00 CEST (UTC+02:00)	Jovetić 7'; Roncaglia (yellow card) 28'; Pasqual (yellow card) 36'; Olivera (yellow card) 75'; Migliaccio (yellow card) 81'	Report	Natali (yellow card) 32'; Pazienza (yellow card) 65'; Taïder (yellow card) 90'	Stadium: Stadio Artemio Franchi; Attendance: 21,8757; Referee: Daniele Orsato

21 October 2012 8	Cagliari	1–0	Bologna	Quartu Sant'Elena
12:30 CEST (UTC+02:00)	Nainggolan 61'; Dessena (yellow card) 90+1'	Report	Kone (yellow card) 43'; Taïder (yellow card) 66'	Stadium: Stadio Is Arenas; Attendance: 4,400; Referee: Daniele Doveri

28 October 2012 9	Bologna	1–3	Internazionale	Bologna
15:00 CET (UTC+01:00)	Pazienza (yellow card) 26'; Diamanti (yellow card) 51'; Cherubin 58'; Morleo (yellow card) 90+1'	Report	Mudingayi (yellow card) 16'; Ranocchia 27'; Milito 53'; Cambiasso 64'; Gargano (yellow card) 69'; Juan (yellow card) 78'	Stadium: Stadio Renato Dall'Ara; Attendance: 24,512; Referee: Andrea De Marco

31 October 2012 10	Juventus	2–1	Bologna	Turin
20:45 CET (UTC+01:00)	Pirlo (yellow card) 47'; Quagliarella 54'; Pogba 90+2'	Report	Pazienza (yellow card) 9'; Motta (yellow card) 61'; Taïder 71'; Kone (yellow card) 82'	Stadium: Juventus Stadium; Attendance: 38,000; Referee: Andrea Romeo

4 November 2012 11	Bologna	1–1	Udinese	Bologna
15:00 CET (UTC+01:00)	Antonsson (yellow card) 37'; Gabbiadini (yellow card) 45'; Diamanti 46'; Abero (yellow card) 48'; Sørensen (yellow card) 85'	Report	Domizzi (yellow card) 16'; Allan (yellow card) 39'; Angella (yellow card) 68'; Di Natale 73'	Stadium: Stadio Renato Dall'Ara; Attendance: 20,000; Referee: Mauro Bergonzi

11 November 2012 12	Torino	1–0	Bologna	Turin
15:00 CET (UTC+01:00)	Darmian (yellow card) 51'; Gazzi (yellow card) 62'; D'Ambrosio 66'	Report	Garics (yellow card) 9'; Pulzetti (yellow card) 33'; Pérez (yellow card) 58'; Sørensen (yellow card) 64'; Motta (yellow card) 83'	Stadium: Stadio Olimpico di Torino; Attendance: 15,000; Referee: Andrea Gervasoni

18 November 2012 13	Bologna	3–0	Palermo	Bologna
15:00 CET (UTC+01:00)	Pérez (yellow card) 13'; Garics (yellow card) 16'; Gilardino 22'; Gabbiadini (yellow card) 42', (goal) 44' (pen.); Taïder (yellow card) 45+2' (yellow-red card) 78'; Diamanti 48' (pen.)	Report	Barreto (yellow card) 17' (yellow-red card) 72'; Donati (yellow card) 44'; Ujkani (red card) 46'; Labrín (red card) 82'	Stadium: Stadio Renato Dall'Ara; Attendance: 20,148; Referee: Paolo Valeri

25 November 2012 14	Sampdoria	1–0	Bologna	Genoa
15:00 CET (UTC+01:00)	Costa (yellow card) 12'; Obiang (yellow card) 16'; Poli 61'; Gastaldello (yellow card) 66'; Maresca (yellow card) 80'	Report	Morleo (red card) 5'; Agliardi (yellow card) 60'; Koné (yellow card) 75'	Stadium: Stadio Luigi Ferraris; Attendance: 21,631; Referee: Domenico Celi

2 December 2012 15	Bologna	2–1	Atalanta	Bologna
15:00 CET (UTC+01:00)	Diamanti 16'; Sørensen (yellow card) 27'; Gabbiadini 70', (yellow card) 79'	Report	Stendardo (yellow card) 27'; Denis 50'; Bonaventura (yellow card) 54'; Peluso (yellow card) 73'; Cigarini (yellow card) 76'	Stadium: Stadio Renato Dall'Ara; Attendance: 20,000; Referee: Antonio Danilo Giannoccaro

10 December 2012 16	Bologna	0–0	Lazio	Bologna
21:00 CET (UTC+01:00)	Guarente (yellow card) 57'; Sørensen (yellow card) 79'	Report	Cavanda (yellow card) 32'; Kozák (yellow card) 55' (yellow-red card) 86'	Stadium: Stadio Renato Dall'Ara; Referee: Antonio Damato

16 December 2012 17	Napoli	2–3	Bologna	Naples
20:45 CET (UTC+01:00)	Behrami (yellow card) 29'; Gamberini 50'; Inler (yellow card) 69'; Cavani 70'	Report	Gabbiadini 10'; Cherubin (yellow card) 18'; Morleo (yellow card) 45+1'; Garics (yellow card) 84'; Kone 86'; Portanova 89'	Stadium: Stadio San Paolo; Attendance: 37,000; Referee: Paolo Valeri

22 December 2012 18	Bologna	1–2	Parma	Bologna
15:00 CET (UTC+01:00)	Pérez (yellow card) 11'; Cherubin (yellow card) 43'; Sørensen 54'	Report	Biabiany (yellow card) 13'; Valdés (yellow card) 53', (goal) 56'; Sansone 66', (yellow card) 66'; Santacroce (yellow card) 89'	Stadium: Stadio Renato Dall'Ara; Attendance: 20,000; Referee: Carmine Russo

6 January 2013 19	Genoa	2–0	Bologna	Genoa
15:00 CET (UTC+01:00)	Pisano (yellow card) 41'; Borriello 57', 73'; Immobile (yellow card) 71'; Antonelli (yellow card) 77'	Report	Kone (yellow card) 38'; Morleo (yellow card) 47'; Krhin (yellow card) 48'; Portanova (yellow card) 74'; Guarente (yellow card) 90+2' (yellow-red card) 90+3'	Stadium: Stadio Luigi Ferraris; Attendance: 20,000; Referee: Luca Banti

12 January 2013 20	Bologna	4–0	Chievo	Bologna
18:00 CET (UTC+01:00)	Kone 13', (yellow card) 32'; Gilardino 44', 59'; Antonsson (yellow card) 76'; Gabbiadini 88'	Report	Cesar (yellow card) 20'; Cofie (yellow card) 30'; Jokić (yellow card) 62'; Rigoni (yellow card) 64'; Paloschi (yellow card) 78'	Stadium: Stadio Renato Dall'Ara; Referee: Davide Massa

20 January 2013 21	Milan	2–1	Bologna	Milan
15:00 CET (UTC+01:00)	Pazzini 65', 82'; Abate (yellow card) 80'	Report	Diamanti (yellow card) 21'; Pazienza (yellow card) 32'; Cherubin (yellow card) 77'; Mexès 84' (o.g.)	Stadium: San Siro; Attendance: 47,000; Referee: Daniele Dovera

27 January 2013 22	Bologna	3–3	Roma	Bologna
12:30 CET (UTC+01:00)	Motta (yellow card) 5'; Gilardino 17'; Gabbiadini 26'; Kone (yellow card) 42'; Pasquato 54'; Pérez (yellow card) 64'; Morleo (yellow card) 69'; Sørensen (yellow card) 77'	Report	Florenzi 9'; Piris (yellow card) 12'; Osvaldo 18'; Pjanić (yellow card) 60'; Tachtsidis 74', (yellow card) 76'	Stadium: Stadio Renato Dall'Ara; Attendance: 20,000; Referee: Antonio Danilo Giannoccaro

3 February 2013 23	Pescara	2–3	Bologna	Pescara
15:00 CET (UTC+01:00)	Weiss 30' (pen.); D'Agostino (yellow card) 41', (goal) 45' (pen.); Sforzini (yellow card) 48'; Cascione (yellow card) 54'; Zanon (yellow card) 76'	Report	Diamanti 34' (pen.); Gilardino 50'; Kone 66'; Pasquato (yellow card) 90+2'	Stadium: Stadio Adriatico; Referee: Andrea De Marco

10 February 2013 24	Bologna	1–1	Siena	Bologna
15:00 CET (UTC+01:00)	Kone 41'; Sørensen (yellow card) 59'; Gabbiadini (yellow card) 65'	Report	Emeghara 33', (yellow card) 40'; Della Rocca (yellow card) 51'; Bogdani (yellow card) 90+2'	Stadium: Stadio Renato Dall'Ara; Attendance: 20,000; Referee: Piero Giacomelli

17 February 2013 25	Catania	1–0	Bologna	Catania
15:00 CET (UTC+01:00)	Almirón 42'; Biagianti (yellow card) 90+2'	Report	Morleo (yellow card) 57'; Pérez (yellow card) 88'	Stadium: Stadio Angelo Massimino; Attendance: 14,000; Referee: Carmine Russo

24 February 2013 26	Bologna	2–1	Fiorentina	Bologna
15:00 CET (UTC+01:00)	Antonsson (yellow card) 29'; Diamanti (yellow card) 45+2'; Gabbiadini (yellow card) 52'; Motta 58'; Christodoulopoulos 84'	Report	Ljajić 27'; Cuadrado (yellow card) 57'; Aquilani (yellow card) 87'	Stadium: Stadio Renato Dall'Ara; Attendance: 20,000; Referee: Marco Guida

3 March 2013 27	Bologna	3–0	Cagliari	Bologna
15:00 CET (UTC+01:00)	Taïder 5'; Diamanti 18', (yellow card) 45+1'; Kone (yellow card) 30'; Pasquato 90+2'	Report	Conti (yellow card) 14'; Nainggolan (yellow card) 34'; Sau (yellow card) 40'; Dessena (yellow card) 56'; Pisano (red card) 57'; Pinilla (yellow card) 62'	Stadium: Stadio Renato Dall'Ara; Attendance: 20,000; Referee: Luca Banti

10 March 2013 28	Internazionale	0–1	Bologna	Milan
20:45 CET (UTC+01:00)	Stanković (yellow card) 39'; Juan (yellow card) 71'	Report	Gabbiadini (yellow card) 17'; Gilardino 57'; Naldo (yellow card) 85'	Stadium: San Siro; Attendance: 47,000; Referee: Gianpaolo Calvarese

16 March 2013 29	Bologna	0–2	Juventus	Bologna
20:45 CET (UTC+01:00)	Antonsson (yellow card) 28'; Pérez (yellow card) 56'; Diamanti (yellow card) 65'	Report	Peluso (yellow card) 22'; Vučinić 62'; Padoin (yellow card) 67'; Vidal (yellow card) 72'; Marchisio 74'	Stadium: Stadio Renato Dall'Ara; Attendance: 34,415; Referee: Mauro Bergonzi

30 March 2013 30	Udinese	0–0	Bologna	Udine
15:00 CET (UTC+01:00)	Domizzi (yellow card) 88'	Report	Pazienza (yellow card) 25'; Christodoulopoulos (yellow card) 28'; Kone (yellow card) 41'; Gilardino (yellow card) 42'; Antonsson (yellow card) 73'; Motta (yellow card) 85'	Stadium: Stadio Friuli; Attendance: 17,000; Referee: Piero Giacomelli

7 April 2013 31	Bologna	2–2	Torino	Bologna
15:00 CEST (UTC+02:00)	Antonsson (yellow card) 35'; Gilardino (yellow card) 45'; Kone 65'; Guarente 86'	Report	Barreto 25'; Basha (yellow card) 41'; Glik (yellow card) 87'; Bianchi 90+4'	Stadium: Stadio Renato Dall'Ara; Attendance: 21,497; Referee: Andrea De Marco

14 April 2013 32	Palermo	1–1	Bologna	Palermo
15:00 CEST (UTC+02:00)	Iličić 5', (yellow card) 30'; Morganella (yellow card) 26'; Donati (yellow card) 90+3'; Aronica (yellow card) 90+5'	Report	Gabbiadini 17'; Kone (yellow card) 29'; Garics (yellow card) 49'; Christodoulopoulos (yellow card) 62'; Guarente (yellow card) 90+5'	Stadium: Stadio Renzo Barbera; Attendance: 26,029; Referee: Daniele Doveri

21 April 2013 33	Bologna	1–1	Sampdoria	Bologna
15:00 CEST (UTC+02:00)	Morleo (yellow card) 13'; Gilardino 23', (yellow card) 83'	Report	Berardi (yellow card) 45+2'; Sansone 59'; Gastaldello (yellow card) 63'; Estigarribia (yellow card) 74'; Obiang (yellow card) 82'; Rossini (yellow card) 85'	Stadium: Stadio Renato Dall'Ara; Attendance: 21,000; Referee: Sebastiano Peruzzo

27 April 2013 34	Atalanta	1–1	Bologna	Bergamo
18:00 CEST (UTC+02:00)	Livaja (yellow card) 61'; Giorgi 67'	Report	Garics (yellow card) 15'; Gilardino 76'; Morleo (yellow card) 84'	Stadium: Stadio Atleti Azzurri d'Italia; Attendance: 14,000; Referee: Maurizio Mariani

5 May 2013 35	Lazio	6–0	Bologna	Rome
15:00 CEST (UTC+02:00)	Lulić (yellow card) 11'; Klose 22', 36', 39', 50', 61'; Hernanes 32'	Report	Abero (yellow card) 57'; Kone (yellow card) 62'; Guarente (yellow card) 90+2'	Stadium: Stadio Olimpico; Attendance: 32,000; Referee: Andrea De Marco

8 May 2013 36	Bologna	0–3	Napoli	Bologna
20:45 CEST (UTC+02:00)	Kone (yellow card) 8'; Gilardino (yellow card) 8'; Pérez (yellow card) 45+2'; Diamanti (yellow card) 57'	Report	Džemaili (yellow card) 36', (goal) 67'; Hamšík 53'; Britos (yellow card) 58'; Cavani 63' (pen.)	Stadium: Stadio Renato Dall'Ara; Attendance: 21,000; Referee: Davide Massa

12 May 2013 37	Parma	0–2	Bologna	Parma
18:00 CEST (UTC+02:00)	Marchionni (yellow card) 32'; Mesbah (yellow card) 90+3'	Report	Taïder 7'; Garics (yellow card) 8'; Morleo (yellow card) 48'; Moscardelli 76'	Stadium: Stadio Ennio Tardini; Attendance: 22,000; Referee: Aleandro Di Paolo

19 May 2013 38	Bologna	0–0	Genoa	Bologna
15:00 CEST (UTC+02:00)	Diamanti (yellow card) 78'	Report	Pisano (yellow card) 54'; Borriello (yellow card) 77'	Stadium: Stadio Renato Dall'Ara; Attendance: 21,000; Referee: Francesco Borriello

=== Coppa Italia ===
18 August 2012 Third round	Bologna	2–1	Varese	Bologna
20:45 CEST (UTC+02:00)	Pérez (yellow card) 36'; Taïder 46', 71'	Report	Momentè 83'	Stadium: Stadio Renato Dall'Ara; Attendance: 5,021; Referee: Dino Tommasi

28 November 2012 Fourth round	Bologna	1–0	Livorno	Bologna
16:00 CET (UTC+01:00)	Pasquato 35'	Report		Stadium: Stadio Renato Dall'Ara; Attendance: 770; Referee: Maurizio Mariani

19 December 2012 Round of 16	Napoli	1–2	Bologna	Naples
20:00 CET (UTC+01:00)	Cavani 12'; Fernández (yellow card) 21'; Britos (yellow card) 29'; Inler (yellow card) 57'	Report	Pasquato 38'; Radaković (yellow card) 62'; Kone (yellow card) 64', (goal) 90+2'	Stadium: Stadio San Paolo; Referee: Daniele Doveri

15 January 2013 Quarter-finals	Internazionale	3–2 (a.e.t.)	Bologna	Milan
21:00 CET (UTC+01:00)	Guarín 34'; Palacio 77'; Pereira (yellow card) 80'; Ranocchia (yellow card) 96', (goal) 120'; Mudingayi (yellow card) 100'	Report	Guarente (yellow card) 15'; Gilardino (yellow card) 78'; Diamanti 81'; Gabbiadini 84', (yellow card) 93'; Motta (yellow card) 112'	Stadium: San Siro; Attendance: 8,734; Referee: Luca Banti

== Statistics ==
=== Appearances and goals ===
No.	Pos	Nat	Player	Total		Serie A		Coppa Italia	
No.	Pos	Nat	Player	Apps	Goals	Apps	Goals	Apps	Goals
Goalkeepers
1	GK	(Italy) ITA	Gianluca Curci	14	0	14	0	0	0
22	GK	(Italy) ITA	Filippo Lombardi	1	0	0	0	1	0
25	GK	(Italy) ITA	Federico Agliardi	24	0	20+2	0	2	0
32	GK	(North Macedonia) MKD	Dejan Stojanović	5	0	4	0	1	0
Defenders
3	DF	(Italy) ITA	Archimede Morleo	35	0	28+4	0	3	0
5	DF	(Sweden) SWE	Mikael Antonsson	33	0	31	0	2	0
8	DF	(Austria) AUT	György Garics	28	0	21+6	0	1	0
11	DF	(Italy) ITA	Marco Motta	22	1	18+1	1	3	0
19	DF	(Uruguay) URU	Mathías Abero	13	0	1+9	0	2+1	0
21	DF	(Italy) ITA	Nicolò Cherubin	30	1	29	1	1	0
43	DF	(Denmark) DEN	Frederik Sørensen	27	1	20+5	1	2	0
45	DF	(Brazil) BRA	Roger Carvalho	8	0	4+2	0	2	0
Midfielders
4	MF	(Slovenia) SLO	Rene Krhin	22	0	12+9	0	1	0
6	MF	(Algeria) ALG	Saphir Taïder	35	5	32+2	3	1	2
13	MF	(Italy) ITA	Nico Pulzetti	8	0	2+4	0	0+2	0
15	MF	(Uruguay) URU	Diego Pérez	25	0	23	0	2	0
17	MF	(Italy) ITA	Tiberio Guarente	23	2	11+9	2	3	0
28	MF	(Spain) ESP	Martí Riverola	3	0	1	0	2	0
30	MF	(Italy) ITA	Michele Pazienza	17	0	10+5	0	1+1	0
33	MF	(Greece) GRE	Panagiotis Kone	34	7	26+5	6	2+1	1
Forwards
10	FW	(Italy) ITA	Alberto Gilardino	37	13	35+1	13	1	0
18	FW	(Italy) ITA	Manolo Gabbiadini	31	7	19+11	6	0+1	1
23	FW	(Italy) ITA	Alessandro Diamanti	36	8	33+1	7	2	1
24	FW	(Italy) ITA	Daniele Paponi	4	0	0+3	0	1	0
77	FW	(Italy) ITA	Cristian Pasquato	18	4	3+12	2	3	2
Players transferred out during the season
7	FW	(Uruguay) URU	Henry Giménez	5	1	0+2	0	2+1	1
9	FW	(Italy) ITA	Robert Acquafresca	7	0	3+3	0	1	0
12	MF	(Italy) ITA	Andrea Pisanu	0	0	0	0	0	0
19	FW	(Uruguay) URU	Federico Rodriguez	0	0	0	0	0	0
90	DF	(Italy) ITA	Daniele Portanova	7	1	5	1	1+1	0

Last updated: 28 October 2012
Source: Competitions

=== Top scorers ===
This includes all competitive matches. The list is sorted by shirt number when total goals are equal.

R	No.	Pos	Nat	Name	Serie A	Coppa Italia	Total
1	10	FW	(Italy)	Alberto Gilardino	13	0	13
2	23	MF	(Italy)	Alessandro Diamanti	7	1	8
3	18	FW	(Italy)	Manolo Gabbiadini	6	1	7
=	33	MF	(Greece)	Panagiotis Kone	6	1	7
5	6	MF	(France)	Saphir Taïder	3	2	5
6	77	FW	(Italy)	Cristian Pasquato	2	2	4
7	17	MF	(Italy)	Tiberio Guarente	2	0	2
8				Own Goals	1	0	1
=	9	FW	(Italy)	Davide Moscardelli	1	0	1
=	11	DF	(Italy)	Marco Motta	1	0	1
=	19	MF	(Greece)	Lazaros Christodoulopoulos	1	0	1
=	21	DF	(Italy)	Nicolò Cherubin	1	0	1
=	43	DF	(Denmark)	Frederik Sørensen	1	0	1
=	90	DF	(Italy)	Daniele Portanova	1	0	1

Last updated: 28 October 2012
Source: Competitions
