= 2013–14 Bologna FC 1909 season =

Bologna
2013–14 season
- Chairman: Albano Guaraldi
- Manager: Stefano Pioli (until 7 January 2014); Davide Ballardini (from 7 January 2014)
- Stadium: Stadio Renato Dall'Ara
- Serie A: 19th
- Coppa Italia: Fourth round
- Top goalscorer: League: Alessandro Diamanti, Panagiotis Kone (5); All: Alessandro Diamanti (6)
- Average home league attendance: 21,145
Home colours	Away colours	Third colours

Bologna F.C. 1909 are an Italian football club which are based in Bologna. During the 2013–14 campaign, they will compete in the Serie A and the Coppa Italia.

== Squad ==
As of 2 September 2013.

Note: Flags indicate national team as defined under FIFA eligibility rules; some limited exceptions apply. Players may hold more than one non-FIFA nationality.

No.	Pos.	Nation	Player
1	GK	ITA	Gianluca Curci (on loan from Roma)
3	DF	ITA	Archimede Morleo
4	MF	SLO	Rene Krhin
5	DF	SWE	Mikael Antonsson
6	DF	DEN	Frederik Sørensen
7	MF	ITA	Francesco Della Rocca
9	FW	ITA	Rolando Bianchi
10	MF	GRE	Lázaros Christodoulópoulos
11	FW	ROU	Denis Alibec (on loan from Internazionale)
12	FW	ITA	Robert Acquafresca
13	MF	URU	Diego Laxalt (on loan from Internazionale)
14	DF	ITA	Cesare Natali
15	MF	URU	Diego Pérez
16	DF	AUT	György Garics

No.	Pos.	Nation	Player
21	DF	ITA	Nicolò Cherubin
22	DF	ITA	Andrea Mantovani (on loan from Palermo)
24	MF	ITA	Michele Pazienza
25	GK	ITA	Federico Agliardi
29	DF	ITA	Marco Maini
31	DF	SRB	Uroš Radaković
32	GK	AUT	Dejan Stojanović
33	MF	GRE	Panagiotis Kone
35	DF	SVK	Marek Čech
75	DF	ESP	José Ángel Crespo
77	FW	URU	Henry Giménez
90	FW	ITA	Davide Moscardelli
92	MF	FRA	Abdallah Yaisien
99	FW	ARG	Jonathan Cristaldo (on loan from (Ukraine) Metalist)

== Competitions ==
=== Serie A ===
==== League table ====
Pos	Team	Pld	W	D	L	GF	GA	GD	Pts	Qualification or relegation
16	Chievo	38	10	6	22	34	54	−20	36	
17	Sassuolo	38	9	7	22	43	72	−29	34	
18	Catania (R)	38	8	8	22	34	66	−32	32	Relegation to Serie B
19	Bologna (R)	38	5	14	19	28	58	−30	29	Relegation to Serie B
20	Livorno (R)	38	6	7	25	39	77	−38	25	Relegation to Serie B

Source: Serie A, Soccerway
Rules for classification: 1st points; 2nd head-to-head points; 3rd head-to-head goal difference; 4th goal difference; 5th number of goals scored; 6th public draw.
(Head-to-head record is applied for clubs with the same number of points only once all matches between said clubs have been played)
(R) Relegated

==== Results summary ====
Overall								Home						Away					
Pld	W	D	L	GF	GA	GD	Pts	W	D	L	GF	GA	GD	W	D	L	GF	GA	GD
38	5	14	19	28	58	−30	29	3	8	8	15	27	−12	2	6	11	13	31	−18

Last updated: 18 May 2014.
Source: Competitive matches

==== Results by round ====
Round	1	2	3	4	5	6	7	8	9	10	11	12	13	14	15	16	17	18	19	20	21	22	23	24	25	26	27	28	29	30	31	32	33	34	35	36	37	38
Ground	A	H	A	H	H	A	H	A	H	A	H	A	H	A	H	A	H	A	H	H	A	H	A	A	H	A	H	A	H	A	H	A	H	A	H	A	H	A
Result	L	D	D	L	D	L	L	L	W	W	D	L	D	D	L	L	W	L	D	D	D	L	W	L	L	D	D	L	W	L	L	D	D	L	L	D	L	L
Position	20	17	15	16	16	18	19	20	18	17	16	16	17	17	19	19	17	17	18	17	17	17	16	16	17	17	17	18	16	17	17	17	17	17	18	18	19	19

Updated to match(es) played on 18 May 2014. Source: Competitive matches
A = Away; H = Home; W = Win; D = Draw; L = Loss

==== Matches ====
25 August 2013 1	Napoli	3–0	Bologna	Naples
20:45	Callejón 32'; Hamšík 45+2', 63'	Summary		Stadium: Stadio San Paolo; Attendance: 39,000; Referee: (Italy) Andrea De Marco

1 September 2013 2	Bologna	2–2	Sampdoria	Bologna
20:45	Moscardelli 41'; Kone 64'	Summary	Éder 25'; Gabbiadini 71'	Stadium: Stadio Renato Dall'Ara; Attendance: 16,509; Referee: (Italy) Dino Tommasi

15 September 2013 3	Udinese	1–1	Bologna	Udine
15:00	Di Natale 85'	Summary	Diamanti 71'	Stadium: Stadio Friuli; Attendance: 14,000; Referee: (Italy) Daniele Doveri

22 September 2013 4	Bologna	1–2	Torino	Bologna
15:00	Natali 29'	Summary	D'Ambrosio 2'; Cerci 45+1' (pen.)	Stadium: Stadio Renato Dall'Ara; Attendance: 20,000; Referee: (Italy) Sebastiano Peruzzo

25 September 2013 5	Bologna	3–3	Milan	Bologna
20:45	Laxalt 33', 52'; Cristaldo 62'	Summary	Poli 12'; Robinho 89'; Abate 90+2'	Stadium: Stadio Renato Dall'Ara; Attendance: 20,000; Referee: (Italy) Paolo Tagliavento

29 September 2013 6	Roma	5–0	Bologna	Rome
19:45	Florenzi 8'; Gervinho 17', 62'; Benatia 26'; Ljajić 85'			Stadium: Stadio Olimpico; Attendance: 39,000; Referee: (Italy) Carmine Russo

6 October 2013 7	Bologna	1–4	Hellas Verona	Bologna
14:00	Diamanti 52' (pen.)		Cacciatore 22'; Iturbe 29'; Toni 56'; Jorginho 90+3'	Stadium: Stadio Renato Dall'Ara; Attendance: 20,000; Referee: (Italy) Paolo Valeri

20 October 2013 8	Sassuolo	2–1	Bologna	Reggio Emilia
14:00	Berardi 12' (pen.); Floro Flores 17'		Diamanti 34' (pen.)	Stadium: Stadio Citta del Tricolore; Attendance: 12,100; Referee: (Italy) Antonio Damato

27 October 2013 9	Bologna	1–0	Livorno	Bologna
14:00	Crespo 3'			Stadium: Stadio Renato Dall'Ara; Attendance: 20,000; Referee: (Italy) Paolo Tagliavento

30 October 2013 10	Cagliari	0–3	Bologna	Quartu Sant'Elena
19:45			Garics 26'; Kone 58'; Pazienza 61'	Stadium: Stadio Is Arenas; Attendance: 7,500; Referee: (Italy) Daniele Orsato

4 November 2013 11	Bologna	0–0	Chievo	Bologna
19:45				Stadium: Stadio Renato Dall'Ara; Attendance: 15,800; Referee: (Italy) Mauro Bergonzi

10 November 2013 12	Atalanta	2–1	Bologna	Bergamo
14:00	Brivio 74'; Livaja 90+3'		Bianchi 77'	Stadium: Stadio Atleti Azzurri d'Italia; Attendance: 12,511; Referee: (Italy) Daniele Doveri

24 November 2013 13	Bologna	1–1	Internazionale	Bologna
19:45	Kone 12', (yellow card) 38'; Diamanti (yellow card) 13'; Morleo (yellow card) 34'; Curci (yellow card) 67'		Taïder (yellow card) 2'; Jonathan 51'	Stadium: Stadio Renato Dall'Ara; Attendance: 23,191; Referee: (Italy) Luca Banti

30 November 2013 14	Parma	1–1	Bologna	Parma
17:00	Cassano 23', (yellow card) 32'; Cassani (yellow card) 28'; Paletta (yellow card) 35'; Lucarelli (yellow card) 46'; Marchionni (yellow card) 57'; Gobbi (yellow card) 89'		Kone 10'; Pérez (yellow card) 32'; Sørensen (yellow card) 33' (yellow-red card) 54'; Garics (yellow card) 84'	Stadium: Stadio Ennio Tardini; Attendance: 11,973; Referee: (Italy) Massimiliano Irrati

6 December 2013 15	Bologna	0–2	Juventus	Bologna
19:45	Mantovani (yellow card) 32'		Vidal 12'; Peluso (yellow card) 23'; Isla (yellow card) 40'; Chiellini (yellow card) 44', (goal) 90'; Marchisio (yellow card) 83'	Stadium: Stadio Renato Dall'Ara; Attendance: 21,000; Referee: (Italy) Paolo Mazzoleni

15 December 2013 16	Fiorentina	3–0	Bologna	Florence
14:00	Iličić 13'; Valero 30'; Guadrado (yellow card) 52'; Rossi 64'; Rebić (yellow card) 79'		Diamanti (yellow card) 62'	Stadium: Stadio Artemio Franchi; Attendance: 29,600; Referee: (Italy) Carmine Russo

22 December 2013 17	Bologna	1–0	Genoa	Bologna
11:30	Diamanti 57', (yellow card) 87'; Curci (yellow card) 63'; Garics (yellow card) 76'; Acquafresca (yellow card) 77'; Krhin (yellow card) 89'		Gamberini (yellow card) 36'	Stadium: Stadio Renato Dall'Ara; Attendance: 20,418; Referee: (Italy) Davide Massa

6 January 2014 18	Catania	2–0	Bologna	Catania
14:00	Bergessio 23'; Rolín (yellow card) 31'; Barrientos (yellow card) 36'; Spolli (yellow card) 45+1'; Peruzzi (yellow card) 54'; Lodi 66' (pen.)		Mantovani (yellow card) 1'; Pérez (yellow card) 23'; Moscardelli (yellow card) 37'; Della Rocca (yellow card) 69'	Stadium: Stadio Angelo Massimino; Attendance: 16,532; Referee: (Italy) Daniele Orsato

11 January 2014 19	Bologna	0–0	Lazio	Bologna
19:45	Kone (yellow card) 26'; Pazienza (yellow card) 61'		Ledsma (yellow card) 69'; Biava (yellow card) 88'	Stadium: Stadio Renato Dall'Ara; Attendance: 16,243; Referee: (Italy) Domenico Celi

19 January 2014 20	Bologna	2–2	Napoli	Bologna
14:00	Bianchi 37', 90', (yellow card) 56'; Pérez (yellow card) 45'; Kone (yellow card) 57' (yellow-red card) 84'; Garics (yellow card) 61'; Pazienza (yellow card) 64'		Albiol (yellow card) 15'; Higuaín 62' (pen.); Callejón 80'; Fernández (yellow card) 90+1'	Stadium: Stadio Renato Dall'Ara; Attendance: 23,398; Referee: (Italy) Antonio Damato

26 January 2014 21	Sampdoria	1–1	Bologna	Genoa
14:00	Gabbiadini 62', (yellow card) 73'; Obiang (yellow card) 63'; Costa (yellow card) 90'		Bianchi (yellow card) 34'; Diamanti (yellow card) 45+2', (goal) 90' (pen.)	Stadium: Stadio Luigi Ferraris; Attendance: 20,481; Referee: (Italy) Marco Guida

1 February 2014 22	Bologna	0–2	Udinese	Bologna
17:00	Cherubin (yellow card) 22'; Kone (yellow card) 50'; Moscardelli (yellow card) 86'		Allan (yellow card) 4'; Di Natale 15' (pen.); Domizzi (yellow card) 22'; Pinzi (yellow card) 67'; Pereyra (yellow card) 82'; López 90+2'	Stadium: Stadio Renato Dall'Ara; Attendance: 22,000; Referee: (Italy) Giampaolo Calvarese

9 February 2014 23	Torino	1–2	Bologna	Turin
11:30	Immobile 5'		Cristaldo 11', 24'	Stadium: Stadio Olimpico di Torino; Attendance: 16,411; Referee: (Italy) Massimiliano Irrati

14 February 2014 24	Milan	1–0	Bologna	Milan
19:45	Zaccardo (yellow card) 85'; Balotelli 86'		Natali (yellow card) 48'; Pérez (yellow card) 88'; Friberg (yellow card) 90+2'	Stadium: San Siro; Attendance: 29,631; Referee: (Italy) Mauro Bergonzi

22 February 2014 25	Bologna	0–1	Roma	Bologna
19:45	Ibson (yellow card) 64'		Benatia (yellow card) 34'; Nainggolan 37', (yellow card) 81'; Romagnoli (yellow card) 45+1'	Stadium: Stadio Renato Dall'Ara; Attendance: 22,755; Referee: (Italy) Davide Massa

2 March 2014 26	Hellas Verona	0–0	Bologna	Verona
14:00	Moras (yellow card) 81'		Pérez (yellow card) 36'; Morleo (yellow card) 47'; Mantovani (yellow card) 59'; Cristaldo (yellow card) 81' (red card) 82'; Christodoulopoulos (yellow card) 82'	Stadium: Stadio Marc'Antonio Bentegodi; Attendance: 20,476; Referee: (Italy) Dino Tommasi

9 March 2014 27	Bologna	0–0	Sassuolo	Bologna
14:00	Paponi (yellow card) 90+4'		Antei (yellow card) 40'; Mendes (yellow card) 76'	Stadium: Stadio Renato Dall'Ara; Attendance: 21,694; Referee: (Italy) Marco Guida

16 March 2014 28	Livorno	2–1	Bologna	Livorno
14:00	Ceccherini (yellow card) 40'; Benassi 46'; Emeghara (yellow card) 50' (yellow-red card) 85'; Paulinho 53'; Mbaye (yellow card) 71' (yellow-red card) 80'; Rinaudo (yellow card) 82'		Pérez (yellow card) 55'; Christodoulopoulos 86' (pen.); Garics (yellow card) 87'; Krhin (yellow card) 90+3'	Stadium: Armando Picchi; Attendance: 10,171; Referee: (Italy) Mauro Bergonzi

23 March 2014 29	Bologna	1–0	Cagliari	Bologna
14:00	Cherubin (yellow card) 41'; Christodoupoulos 78' (pen.), (yellow card) 82'		Rossettini (yellow card) 15'; Perico (yellow card) 45+1'; Astori (yellow card) 54'	Stadium: Stadio Renato Dall'Ara; Attendance: 16,286; Referee: (Italy) Andrea Gervasoni

26 March 2014 30	Chievo	3–0	Bologna	Verona
19:45	Paloschi 7' (pen.), 78', (yellow card) 78'; Rigoni (yellow card) 13', (goal) 89'		Morleo (yellow card) 21'; Ibson (yellow card) 72'; Cherubin (yellow card) 81'	Stadium: Stadio Marc'Antonio Bentegodi; Attendance: 7,000; Referee: (Italy) Gianluca Rocchi

29 March 2014 31	Bologna	0–2	Atalanta	Bologna
18:00	Acquafresca (yellow card) 18'; Moscardelli (yellow card) 90'		Stendardo (yellow card) 3'; De Luca 22'; Estigarribia 26'; Livaja (yellow card) 71'	Stadium: Stadio Renato Dall'Ara; Attendance: 20,413; Referee: (Italy) Paolo Valeri

5 April 2014 32	Internazionale	2–2	Bologna	Milan
20:45	Icardi 6', 63'; Ranocchia (yellow card) 81'		Cristaldo 35'; Mantovani (yellow card) 39'; Kone 73', (yellow card) 84'	Stadium: San Siro; Attendance: 38,817; Referee: (Italy) Paolo Mazzoleni

13 April 2014 33	Bologna	1–1	Parma	Bologna
12:30	Cherubin 44'; Pazienza (yellow card) 78'; Morleo (yellow card) 82'; Garics (yellow card) 82'		Palladino 79'; Lucarelli (yellow card) 85'	Stadium: Stadio Renato Dall'Ara; Attendance: 21,379; Referee: (Italy) Daniele Doveri

19 April 2014 34	Juventus	1–0	Bologna	Turin
18:30	Pogba 64'		Antonsson (yellow card) 54'; Friberg (yellow card) 74'	Stadium: Juventus Stadium; Attendance: 39,131; Referee: (Italy) Piero Giacomelli

26 April 2014 35	Bologna	0–3	Fiorentina	Bologna
18:00	Kone (yellow card) 71'		Diakité (yellow card) 11'; Cuadrado 23', 87'; Iličić 34'	Stadium: Stadio Renato Dall'Ara; Attendance: 23,875; Referee: (Italy) Davide Massa

4 May 2014 36	Genoa	0–0	Bologna	Genoa
14:00	Cofie (yellow card) 24'; Sculli (yellow card) 25'; Burdisso (yellow card) 34'		Kone (yellow card) 25'; Bianchi (yellow card) 45+2'; Natali (yellow card) 77'; Cherubin (yellow card) 83'	Stadium: Stadio Luigi Ferraris; Attendance: 18,601; Referee: (Italy) Marco Guida

11 May 2014 37	Bologna	1–2	Catania	Bologna
14:00	Kone (yellow card) 21'; Bianchi (yellow card) 34'; Christodoulopoulos (yellow card) 49'; Morleo 79', (yellow card) 84'; Paponi (red card) 84'		Peruzzi (yellow card) 5' (yellow-red card) 29'; Monzón 22'; Rinaudo (yellow card) 50'; Frison (yellow card) 61'; Bergessio 84'	Stadium: Stadio Renato Dall'Ara; Attendance: 30,929; Referee: (Italy) Gianluca Rocchi

18 May 2014 38	Lazio	1–0	Bologna	Rome
19:45	Felipe Anderson (yellow card) 61'; Pereirinha (yellow card) 72'; Biglia 90+4' (pen.)		Pazienza (yellow card) 42'	Stadium: Stadio Olimpico; Attendance: 26,752; Referee: (Italy) Fabio Maresca

=== Coppa Italia ===
17 August 2013 Third Round	Bologna	1–0	Brescia	Bologna
19:45	Diamanti 40'			Stadium: Stadio Renato Dall'Ara; Attendance: 5,000; Referee: (Italy) Paolo Tagliavento

3 December 2013 Fourth Round	Bologna	1–2 (a.e.t.)	Siena	Bologna
19:00	Moscardelli 86'; Yaisien (yellow card) 90+3'		Matheu (yellow card) 30'; Valiani 78'; Feddal (yellow card) 117', (goal) 120+2'	Stadium: Stadio Renato Dall'Ara; Attendance: 1,500; Referee: (Italy) Daniele Chiffi

== Squad statistics ==
=== Appearances and goals ===
No.	Pos	Nat	Player	Total		Serie A		Coppa Italia	
No.	Pos	Nat	Player	Apps	Goals	Apps	Goals	Apps	Goals
Goalkeepers
1	GK	(Italy) ITA	Gianluca Curci	13	0	12	0	1	0
25	GK	(Italy) ITA	Federico Agliardi	0	0	0	0	0	0
32	GK	(Austria) AUT	Dejan Stojanović	0	0	0	0	0	0
Defenders
3	DF	(Italy) ITA	Archimede Morleo	8	0	6+1	0	1	0
5	DF	(Sweden) SWE	Mikael Antonsson	11	0	9+1	0	1	0
6	DF	(Denmark) DEN	Frederik Sørensen	7	0	6+1	0	0	0
14	DF	(Italy) ITA	Cesare Natali	8	1	7	1	1	0
16	DF	(Austria) AUT	György Garics	12	1	10+1	1	1	0
21	DF	(Italy) ITA	Nicolò Cherubin	0	0	0	0	0	0
22	DF	(Italy) ITA	Andrea Mantovani	7	0	5+2	0	0	0
31	DF	(Serbia) SRB	Uroš Radaković	0	0	0	0	0	0
35	DF	(Slovakia) SVK	Marek Čech	6	0	6	0	0	0
75	DF	(Spain) ESP	José Ángel Crespo	4	1	3+1	1	0	0
Midfielders
4	MF	(Slovenia) SLO	Rene Krhin	10	0	7+2	0	1	0
7	MF	(Italy) ITA	Francesco Della Rocca	8	0	5+2	0	1	0
8	MF	(Greece) GRE	Panagiotis Kone	12	2	11	2	1	0
10	MF	(Greece) GRE	Lazaros Christodoulopoulos	8	0	2+5	0	1	0
13	MF	(Uruguay) URU	Diego Laxalt	8	2	7+1	2	0	0
15	MF	(Uruguay) URU	Diego Pérez	10	0	3+7	0	0	0
24	MF	(Italy) ITA	Michele Pazienza	7	1	6	1	0+1	0
Forwards
9	FW	(Italy) ITA	Rolando Bianchi	10	1	5+4	1	1	0
11	FW	(Romania) ROU	Denis Alibec	1	0	0	0	0+1	0
12	FW	(Italy) ITA	Robert Acquafresca	3	0	0+3	0	0	0
23	FW	(Italy) ITA	Alessandro Diamanti	12	4	11	3	1	1
77	FW	(Uruguay) URU	Henry Giménez	0	0	0	0	0	0
90	FW	(Italy) ITA	Davide Moscardelli	7	1	3+3	1	0+1	0
92	FW	(France) FRA	Abdallah Yaisien	0	0	0	0	0	0
99	FW	(Argentina) ARG	Jonathan Cristaldo	10	1	8+2	1	0	0

Last updated: 28 October 2012
Source: Competitions

=== Top scorers ===
This includes all competitive matches. The list is sorted by shirt number when total goals are equal.

R	No.	Pos	Nat	Name	Serie A	Coppa Italia	Total
1	23	FW	(Italy)	Alessandro Diamanti	3	1	4
2	8	MF	(Greece)	Panagiotis Kone	2	0	2
=	13	MF	(Uruguay)	Diego Laxalt	2	0	2
4	9	FW	(Italy)	Rolando Bianchi	1	0	1
=	14	DF	(Italy)	Cesare Natali	1	0	1
=	16	DF	(Austria)	György Garics	1	0	1
=	24	MF	(Italy)	Michele Pazienza	1	0	1
=	75	DF	(Spain)	José Ángel Crespo	1	0	1
=	90	FW	(Italy)	Davide Moscardelli	1	0	1
=	99	FW	(Argentina)	Jonathan Cristaldo	1	0	1

Last updated: 28 October 2012
Source: Competitions
