= Cristian Pasquato =

Italian footballer (born 1989)

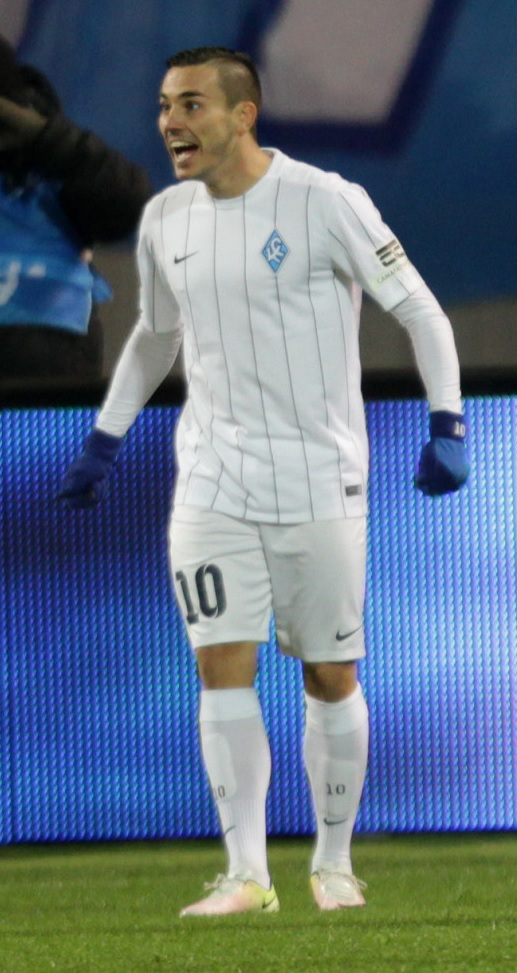
- Pasquato with Krylia Sovetov in 2016

Personal information
- Date of birth: 20 July 1989 (age 37)
- Place of birth: Padua, Italy
- Height: 1.72 m (5 ft 8 in)
- Position: Midfielder

Team information
- Current team: Campodarsego

Youth career
- 1995–1996: Padova
- 1996–2003: Montebelluna
- 2003–2008: Juventus

Senior career*
Years	Team	Apps	(Gls)
2008–2012	Juventus	1	(0)
2008–2010	→ Empoli (loan)	35	(2)
2010	→ Triestina (loan)	16	(1)
2010–2011	→ Modena (loan)	40	(9)
2011–2012	→ Lecce (loan)	11	(0)
2012	→ Torino (loan)	3	(1)
2012–2014	Udinese	0	(0)
2012–2013	→ Bologna (loan)	15	(2)
2013–2014	→ Padova (loan)	37	(7)
2014–2017	Juventus	0	(0)
2014–2015	→ Pescara (loan)	33	(6)
2015	→ Livorno (loan)	19	(4)
2016	→ Pescara (loan)	12	(0)
2016–2017	→ Krylia Sovetov (loan)	26	(5)
2017–2019	Legia Warsaw	29	(2)
2017–2018	Legia Warsaw II	2	(3)
2019–2020	Campodarsego	13	(4)
2020–2021	Gubbio	32	(3)
2021–2024	Trento	90	(14)
2024–	Campodarsego	0	(0)

International career
2009–2010	Italy U-21	5	(0)
- * Club domestic league appearances and goals as of 3 May 2024

Cristian Pasquato (born 20 July 1989) is an Italian footballer who plays as a midfielder for Serie D Group C club Campodarsego.

== Club career ==
=== Early career ===
Born in Padua, Pasquato began his career in the youth ranks of Padova at age six. After just one season with his hometown club, however, he joined the youth setup of Montebelluna, where he ultimately would remain until 2003, when he was scouted out by Juventus officials.

=== Juventus ===
Pasquato officially joined Juventus in July 2003 and instantly earned early comparisons to club legend Alessandro Del Piero, most notably due to their origins at Padova, but also due their similar field positions and free-kick abilities. In 2006, Pasquato reached the Primavera team after winning the Allievi title. Being a free kick specialist, Pasquato scored the winner against Internazionale in the Supercoppa Primavera final. After six years in the Juventus youth sector, Pasquato began to earn senior call-ups from coach Claudio Ranieri during the 2007–08 Serie A season, and made his first team debut on 11 May 2008, the final matchday of that season, as a second-half substitute. Following the Primavera final, Pasquato was promoted to the first team.

Pasquato continued with the Juventus first team during the 2008–09 pre-season and impressed throughout the summer. He also competed with the team in the UEFA Champions League.

=== Loan Deals ===
On 24 August 2008, it was confirmed that Pasquato had signed for Serie B side Empoli on a one-year loan deal. With the Tuscan club, Pasquato made 23 league appearances and scored one goal in his first full season in the professional leagues. On 1 July 2009, he returned to Juventus, though his loan with Empoli would be extended for one more season soon after. During the andata of the 2009–10 Serie B campaign, Pasquato managed just nine league appearances, scoring one goal.

Because of his lack of match time, Juventus recalled the young forward back to Turin during the 2010 January transfer window before ultimately re-loaning the player back to the second division with Triestina. During his loan with the club from Trieste, Pasquato made 16 league appearances and scored one goal. His efforts were not enough to save the club from relegation to the Lega Pro Prima Divisione at the end of the season.

After returning to Juventus on 30 June 2010 following the expiration of his six-month loan deal with Triestina, Pasquato was again loaned out, this time to Modena, another Serie B club. He spent the entire 2010–11 season at Modena, scoring nine goals and notching 13 assists in 40 league games for the club. After the highly productive season with the gialloblu, Pasquato returned to Juve once more, and after training with the first team for the entire pre-season and competing in several summer tournaments and friendly matches, it was believed that the youngster would remain in Turin under new coach Antonio Conte. On 26 July 2011, Pasquato notably scored the winning goal for Juventus in a 1–0 win over América in the 2011 World Football Challenge. Pasquato began the match as a starter on the left wing of Conte's 4–2–4, and scored a brilliant volley past Armando Navarrete after 42 minutes of play. The match was held in New York at CitiField.

On 31 August 2011, Pasquato was once again sent out on loan by Juventus: he was loaned to fellow Serie A club Lecce – along with teammate Manuel Giandonato – on a season-long loan. He was, however, recalled from his loan period at Lecce on 27 January 2012 due to limited play time. He was loaned out to city-rivals Torino in the Serie B just two days later, on 29 January 2012.

=== Udinese ===
On 30 June 2012, Pasquato returned to Juventus, although the club sold half of his registration rights to Udinese for €1.5 million as part of a deal that also saw Kwadwo Asamoah and Mauricio Isla move from Udinese to Juventus, also in co-ownership deals.

==== Loan to Bologna ====
Pasquato was then immediately sent on loan by Udinese to Bologna on a season-long loan deal, where he teamed up with former Juve teammates Marco Motta, Michele Pazienza and Frederik Sørensen. On 26 August he made his debut in Serie A, as a substitute replacing Robert Acquafresca in the 88th minute of a 2–0 away defeat against ChievoVerona. On 28 November he scored his first goal for Bologna, in the fourth round of Coppa Italia, in the 35th minute of a 1–0 home win over Livorno. On 29 December, Pasquato scored his second goal, in the round of 16 of Coppa Italia, in the 38th minute of a 2–1 away win over Napoli. On 15 January 2013, Pasquato played in the quarter-finals of Coppa Italia, he was replaced by Manolo Gabbiadini in the 55th minute of a 3–2 away defeat against Inter. On 27 January he scored his first Serie A goal for Bologna, as a substitute, in the 54th minute of a 3–3 home draw against Roma. On 3 March he scored his second goal in Serie A, again as a substitute in the 92nd minute of a 3–0 home win over Cagliari. Pasquato ended his loan to Bologna with 18 appearances, 4 goals and 1 assist.

On 17 June 2013, Udinese and Juventus renewed the co-ownership agreement of the player, with Udinese continuing to hold onto his registration rights.

==== Loan to Padova ====
On 8 August 2013, Udinese loaned Pasquato to Serie B club Padova. On 11 August he made his debut for Padova, in the second round of Coppa Italia, as a substitute replacing Andrea Raimondi in the 66th minute and he scored his first goal for Padova in the 83rd minute of a 2–1 home win over Virtus Entella. On 17 August, Pasquato played in the third round of Coppa Italia, he was replaced by Davide Voltan in the 55th minute of a 1–0 away defeat against Trapani. On 24 August he made his Serie B debut for Padova, he was replaced by Andrea Raimondi in the 72nd minute of a 2–0 home defeat against Trapani. On 8 September, Pasquato played his first full match for Padova, a 3–0 home defeat against Palermo. On 21 September, Pasquato scored his first goal in Serie B for Padova in the 14th minute of a 3–1 away defeat against Empoli. On 4 October he scored his second goal in 61st minute of a 3–2 home win over Varese. On 19 October, Pasquato scored his third goal in the 89th minute of a 2–1 home win over Juve Stabia. Pasquato ended his season-long loan to Padova with 39 appearances, 8 goals and 5 assists.

=== Return to Juventus ===
On 20 June 2014, Juventus confirmed the outright purchase of Pasquato from Udinese on a three-year contract for €1.5 million fee.

==== Loan to Pescara ====
On 1 September 2014, Pasquato was signed by Pescara. On 7 September, Pasquato made his debut in Serie B for Pescara in a match against Ternana, he scored his first goal for Pescara in the 55th minute and he was replaced by Roberto Guana in the 70th minute of a 1–1 away draw. On 4 October, Pasquato scored his second goal, as a substitute in the 82nd minute of a 4–0 home win over Virtus Entella. On 12 October he scored his third goal in the 42nd minute of a 4–1 away win over Crotone. On 2 December he played, as a substitute, in the fourth round of Coppa Italia, he replaced Birkir Bjarnason in the 83rd minute of a 1–0 away defeat against Sassuolo. On 17 January 2015, Pasquato scored 2 goals in a 4–2 away win over Trapani. On 24 January he played his first full match for Pescara, a 2–1 home defeat against Ternana. On 12 February he was sent off with a double yellow card in the 42nd minute of a 1–0 home win over Catania. Pasquato ended his season-long loan to Pescara with 38 appearances, 7 goals and 7 assists.

==== Loan to Livorno and Pescara ====
On 31 August 2015, Pasquato was signed by Livorno on a 6-month loan deal. On 6 September he made his debut for Livorno in Serie B, he was replaced by Riccardo Cazzola in 61st minute of a 4–0 home win over Pescara. On 21 September he played his first full match for Livorno, a 3–2 away win over Ternana, in this match he scored his first goal for Livorno in the 86th minute. On 26 September, Pasquato scored his second goal for Livorno, as a substitute, in the 72nd minute of a 2–1 home defeat against Spezia. On 24 October he scored twice in a 2–0 home win over Modena. Pasquato finished his loan to Livorno with 19 appearances, 4 goals and 2 assists.

On 1 February 2016, Pasquato returned to Pescara on a 6-month loan deal. On 6 February he made his debut for Pescara as a substitute replacing Ahmed Benali in the 67th minute of a 2–2 away draw against Salernitana. On 19 April, Pasquato played his first full match for Pescara in this season, a 1–0 away win over Spezia. On 1 June he scored his first goal for Pescara in this season in the 34th minute of a 4–2 home win over Novara. Pasquato ended his loan to Pescara with 15 appearances and 1 goal.

==== Loan to Krylia Sovetov ====
On 10 August 2016, Pasquato joined Russian Premier League club Krylia Sovetov on a season-long loan. He also added one more year to his current contract with Juventus (to 2018). On 26 August he made his debut for Krylia Sovetov as a substitute replacing Sergey Tkachev the 79th minute of a 1–0 home defeat against Ufa. On 22 September he played in the round of 32 of Russian Cup in a 2–0 away win over Shinnik. On 26 September, Pasquato played his first full match, in Premier League, for Krylia Sovetov, a 0–0 away draw against Amkar Perm. On 27 October, Pasquato played, as a substitute, in the round of 16 of Russian Cup in a 3–1 home defeat against Lokomotiv Moscow. On 20 November, Pasquato scored his first goal for Krylia Sovetov in the 4th minute of a 3–1 away defeat against Zenit. On 1 December he scored his second goal in the 59th minute of a 4–0 home win over Spartak Moscow. On 15 April 2017 he scored his third goal in the 64th minute of a 3–1 away win over Anzhi Makhachkala. Pasquato ended his loan to Krylia Sovetov with 28 appearances, 5 goals and 8 assists.

=== Legia Warsaw ===
On 19 July 2017, Pasquato joined Polish Ekstraklasa side Legia Warsaw. On 22 July he made his debut in Ekstraklasa for Legia Warsaw as a substitute replacing Sebastian Szymanski in the 57th minute of a 1–1 home draw against Korona Kielce. On 25 October he scored his first goal for Legia Warsaw in the 29th minute of a 3–1 away win over Bytovia Bytow in the first leg of quarter-finals of the Polish Cup.

=== Campodarsego ===
On 2 July 2019, Pasquato began a free agent when his contract with Legia Warsaw expired. On 21 October 2019, Pasquato joined Campodarsego, a team competing in Serie D – Girone C, the fourth tier of Italian football.

=== Gubbio ===
On 21 August 2020 he signed with Serie C club Gubbio.

=== Trento ===
On 8 September 2021, he joined Trento as a free agent.

== International career ==
Pasquato has represented Italy at every youth level, from under-15 to under-21. On 25 March 2009, he made his debut with the Italy U-21 squad in a friendly match against Austria.

== Style of play ==
Pasquato is a versatile player capable of operating in several attacking and offensive midfield roles. He has been deployed as a second striker, in the centre as an attacking midfielder, and as a left winger, a position that allows him to take on opponents, cut inside, and shoot with his stronger right foot. He is described as a quick and agile player with good technical ability, including dribbling skills, vision, and a slender build, and has been noted for his capacity to create chances for teammates. In his youth, he was regarded as a promising talent. He has also been identified as a set-piece specialist, particularly for his bending shots and free kicks.

== Career statistics ==
=== Club ===
As of match played 7 November 2021

Appearances and goals by club, season and competition
Club	Season	League			National cup (Note: Includes Coppa Italia, Russian Cup, Polish Cup)		League cup (Note: Includes Coppa Italia Serie C)		Continental		Other		Total	
Club	Season	Division	Apps	Goals	Apps	Goals	Apps	Goals	Apps	Goals	Apps	Goals	Apps	Goals
Juventus	2007–08	Serie A	1	0	0	0	—		—		—		1	0
Empoli (loan)	2008–09	Serie B	23	1	2	0	—		—		—		25	1
Empoli (loan)	2009–10	Serie B	12	1	1	0	—		—		—		13	1
Empoli (loan)	Total		35	2	3	0	—		—		—		38	2
Triestina (loan)	2009–10	Serie B	16	1	0	0	—		—		—		16	1
Modena (loan)	2010–11	Serie B	40	9	2	0	—		—		—		42	9
Lecce (loan)	2011–12	Serie A	11	0	0	0	—		—		—		11	0
Torino (loan)	2011–12	Serie B	3	1	0	0	—		—		—		3	1
Bologna (loan)	2012–13	Serie A	15	2	3	2	—		—		—		18	4
Padova (loan)	2013–14	Serie B	37	7	2	1	—		—		—		39	8
Pescara (loan)	2014–15	Serie B	33	6	1	0	—		—		4 (Note: Appearances in Serie B promotion play-offs)	1	38	7
Livorno (loan)	2015–16	Serie B	19	4	0	0	—		—		—		19	4
Pescara (loan)	2015–16	Serie B	12	0	0	0	—		—		3	1	15	1
Krylia Sovetov (loan)	2016–17	Russian Premier League	26	5	2	0	—		—		—		28	5
Legia Warsaw	2017–18	Ekstraklasa	22	2	5	1	—		1 (Note: Appearance in UEFA Champions League)	0	—		28	3
Legia Warsaw	2018–19	Ekstraklasa	7	0	1	0	—		—		—		8	0
Legia Warsaw	Total		29	2	6	1	—		1	0	—		36	3
Legia Warsaw II	2017–18	III liga, gr. I	1	2	—		—		—		—		1	2
Legia Warsaw II	2018–19	III liga, gr. I	1	1	—		—		—		—		1	2
Legia Warsaw II	Total		2	3	—		—		—		—		2	3
Campodarsego	2019–20	Serie D	13	4	—		—		—		—		13	4
Gubbio	2020–21	Serie C	32	3	—		—		—		—		32	3
Trento	2021–22	Serie C	11	3	—		1	0	—		—		12	3
Career total			335	52	19	4	1	0	1	0	7	2	363	58

== Honours ==
Juventus Primavera

- Supercoppa Primavera: 2007
- Champions Youth Cup: 2007 (runner-up)
- Allievi Nazionali Youth League: 2005–06

Legia Warsaw

- Ekstraklasa: 2017–18
- Polish Cup: 2017–18

Italy U17

- U–17 Pepsi International Tournament: 2005
