= Martí Riverola =

Spanish footballer

Personal information
- Full name: Martí Riverola Bataller
- Date of birth: 26 January 1991 (age 35)
- Place of birth: Barcelona, Spain
- Height: 1.77 m (5 ft 10 in)
- Position: Midfielder

Youth career
- 1999–2010: Barcelona

Senior career*
Years	Team	Apps	(Gls)
2009–2012	Barcelona B	38	(5)
2011	→ Vitesse (loan)	15	(2)
2011	Barcelona	0	(0)
2012–2015	Bologna	1	(0)
2013–2014	→ Mallorca (loan)	15	(1)
2015	→ Rheindorf Altach (loan)	4	(0)
2015–2017	Foggia	43	(3)
2017–2018	Reggiana	44	(3)
2018–2019	Ibiza	16	(0)
2019–2022	Andorra	79	(5)
2022–2023	Atlètic d'Escaldes	25	(6)
2023–2024	Inter d'Escaldes	19	(0)
Total		299	(25)
- * Club domestic league appearances and goals

Martí Riverola Bataller (born 26 January 1991) is a Spanish former professional footballer who played as a central midfielder.

== Club career ==
=== Barcelona ===
Born in Barcelona, Catalonia, Riverola joined FC Barcelona's youth academy in 1999 at the age of 8, and started his career as a forward, being reconverted into a midfielder for the 2004–05 season. In spite of this change he retained his goalscoring touch, being the under-19's second-top scorer in 2010 with 13 goals.

In late 2009, still registered with the juniors, Riverola made his debut for Barcelona's B team, in a 2–0 away win against neighbours RCD Espanyol B. They eventually returned to Segunda División after 11 years, but the player only appeared once more in the league.

Riverola joined Eredivisie club SBV Vitesse in January 2011 on a six-month-long loan, as the Dutch were managed by his compatriot Albert Ferrer, himself a former Barcelona player. In July, he returned to Barcelona and its reserves alongside Isaac Cuenca, and scored five goals in 32 games throughout the campaign to help the B's finish eighth.

On 6 December 2011, Riverola made his only official appearance for the main squad, coming on as a substitute for Sergi Roberto in the dying minutes of a 4–0 home victory over FC BATE Borisov in the UEFA Champions League.

=== Bologna ===
On 7 June 2012, Riverola was presented as a player of Bologna FC 1909, having already agreed to a four-year contract in late January; FIFA later ordered the Italian side to pay Barcelona €535,000 as training compensation, although he was a free agent. During his spell at the Stadio Renato Dall'Ara he only appeared in three competitive games, his Serie A input consisting of 50 minutes in a 2–1 loss at AC Milan on 20 January 2013.

In August 2013, Riverola was loaned to RCD Mallorca of the Spanish second tier, and he spent the second half of the 2014–15 season with SC Rheindorf Altach of the Austrian Bundesliga, on loan with an option make the move permanent.

=== Foggia and Reggiana ===
On 17 July 2015, Riverola was signed by Foggia Calcio on a two-year contract. In January 2017, he joined AC Reggiana 1919 also in the Serie C.

=== Ibiza and Andorra ===
Riverola returned to his country in August 2018, with third-division UD Ibiza. He joined FC Andorra in the following transfer window, going on to be part of the squad that promoted from the regional leagues to the professional ones in just three years.

On 1 September 2022, Riverola terminated his contract. He remained in the principality nonetheless, signing with Primera Divisió side Atlètic Club d'Escaldes.

Riverola's last club was also in the Andorran top division, Inter Club d'Escaldes.

== Career statistics ==
As of match played 9 May 2021

Appearances and goals by club, season and competition
Club	Season	League			National Cup		Continental		Total	
Club	Season	Division	Apps	Goals	Apps	Goals	Apps	Goals	Apps	Goals
Barcelona B	2009–10	Segunda División B	2	0	—		—		2	0
Barcelona B	2010–11	Segunda División	4	0	—		—		4	0
Barcelona B	2011–12	Segunda División	32	5	—		—		32	5
Barcelona B	Total		38	5	0	0	0	0	38	5
Vitesse (loan)	2010–11	Eredivisie	15	2	0	0	—		15	2
Barcelona	2011–12	La Liga	0	0	0	0	1 (Note: Appearance in UEFA Champions League)	0	1	0
Bologna	2012–13	Serie A	1	0	2	0	—		3	0
Mallorca (loan)	2013–14	Segunda División	15	1	1	0	—		16	1
Rheindorf Altach (loan)	2014–15	Austrian Bundesliga	4	0	1	0	—		5	0
Foggia	2015–16	Lega Pro	27	2	3	0	—		30	2
Foggia	2016–17	Lega Pro	16	1	2	0	—		18	1
Foggia	Total		43	3	5	0	0	0	48	3
Reggiana	2016–17	Lega Pro	10	0	0	0	—		10	0
Reggiana	2017–18	Serie C	34	3	0	0	—		34	3
Reggiana	Total		44	3	0	0	0	0	44	3
Ibiza	2018–19	Segunda División B	16	0	0	0	—		16	0
Andorra	2019–20	Segunda División B	26	1	1	0	—		27	1
Andorra	2020–21	Segunda División B	25	0	1	0	—		26	0
Andorra	Total		51	1	2	0	0	0	53	1
Career total			227	15	11	0	1	0	239	15
