= Riccardo Meggiorini =

Italian footballer

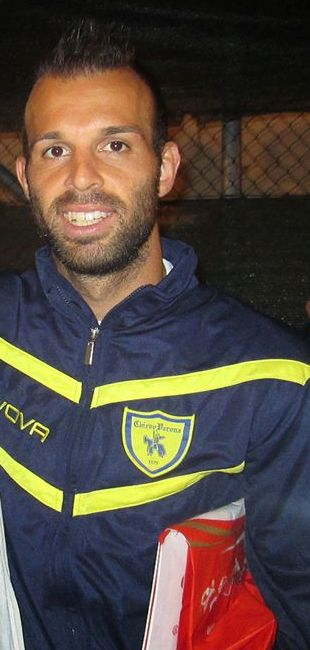
- Meggiorini playing for Chievo in 2014

Personal information
- Date of birth: 4 September 1985 (age 41)
- Place of birth: Isola della Scala, Italy
- Height: 1.82 m (6 ft 0 in)
- Position: Striker

Team information
- Current team: San Giovanni Lupatoto

Youth career
- 1997–2000: Hellas Verona
- 2000–2003: Bovolone
- 2003–2004: Inter

Senior career*
| Years | Team | Apps | (Gls) |
| 2004–2006 | Inter | 1 | (0) |
| 2005 | → Spezia (loan) | 10 | (0) |
| 2005–2006 | → Pavia (loan) | 12 | (0) |
| 2006–2009 | Cittadella | 110 | (41) |
| 2009–2010 | Bari | 31 | (5) |
| 2010–2011 | Bologna | 29 | (1) |
| 2011–2012 | Genoa | 0 | (0) |
| 2011–2012 | → Novara (loan) | 12 | (1) |
| 2012–2014 | Torino | 83 | (7) |
| 2014–2020 | Chievo | 148 | (23) |
| 2020–2022 | Vicenza | 57 | (16) |
| 2022– | San Giovanni Lupatoto | 0 | (0) |

International career
| 2004 | Italy U19 | 1 | (0) |
| 2005 | Italy U20 | 2 | (0) |
- * Club domestic league appearances and goals as of 6 May 2022

Riccardo Meggiorini (born 4 September 1985) is an Italian former professional footballer who played as a forward.

== Club career ==
=== Early career ===
Meggiorini took his first steps as a footballer at age eight, in a small football team from Tarmassia, a small fraction of Isola della Scala, and at 12 he entered in the Verona youth system, where he remained for two years. He moved to Bovolone in 2000, in which he scored 46 goals in 26 games in the category of Allievi regionali. He earned a call-up to the first team the following season, scoring 13 times in 27 appearances.

=== Inter Milan ===
In the summer of 2003, Meggiorini moved, on loan, to Internazionale, who placed him in the Primavera of the Nerazzurri. At the end of the season, on 23 June 2004 the club redeemed his contract. After starting the season in the youth team, Roberto Mancini called him up into the first team for the trip to Cagliari, giving him his Serie A debut on 14 November 2004, which ended 3–3.

=== Spezia and Pavia ===
In January 2005, he left on loan to Spezia of Serie C1, along with Hernán Paolo Dellafiore. In the summer of the same year, he moved to Pavia, also in Serie C1. In January 2006, he moved to Cittadella, another Serie C1 team. He loan was extended in July 2006

=== Cittadella ===
He was bought by Cittadella in co-ownership deal in summer 2007, for €40,000, and won promotion to Serie B in June 2008.

=== Genoa and Bari ===
In June 2009 Meggiorini was involved in the signing of Diego Milito (€28 million) and Thiago Motta (€10.2 million). Which Inter paid Genoa €20 million cash and half of the registration rights of Meggiorini (tagged for €2.5 million), Robert Acquafresca (€9.5 million), half of Ivan Fatić (€200,000), Leonardo Bonucci (€3 million) and Francesco Bolzoni (€3 million). Genoa also paid another €2.5 million to Cittadella via Inter in order to fully owned the registration rights of Meggiorini.

Meggiorini was transferred to Bari on 2 July 2009 along with Bonucci, Matteo Paro (loan), Andrea Ranocchia (loan) and Giuseppe Greco (loan) in another co-ownership deal, which the 50% registration rights of Bonucci Meggiorini were valued €1.75 million and €2.75 million respectively.

On 26 June 2010, he was bought back by Genoa as the Liguria side made a higher bid than Bari in a closed tender, for €1.79 million. Four days later, Genoa was reported to have agreed with Chievo to swap Meggiorini for goalkeeper Stefano Sorrentino. However, the deal collapsed.

=== Bologna ===
On 9 July 2010, he was sold to Bologna in another co-ownership deal, for €3 million. Despite not a solid member of starting XI, he also made 3 assists, tied the team record with Diego Pérez.

=== Novara ===
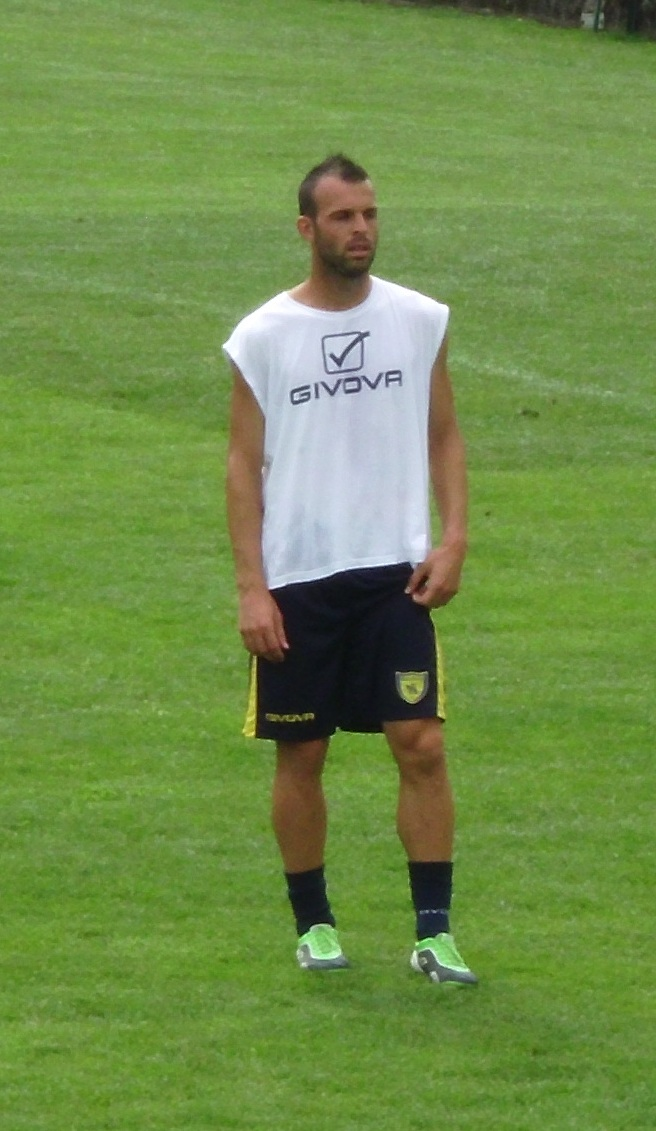
Meggiorini training with Chievo

The following year Genoa bought back Meggiorini again (direct swap with Federico Rodríguez) but left for another side, Serie A newcomer Novara in temporary deal, for €400,000, as the club had sold its flagship striker Pablo Andrés González and Cristian Bertani.

=== Torino ===
On 16 January 2012, he was sold in co-ownership to Torino, returning to Serie B after playing in the top flight for three years. The fee was €1 million. He debuted 21 January against his former team, Cittadella, substituting Juan Surraco in the 71st minute. In February 2012, he scored the match-winner against Sampdoria, 2–1. On 1 May he scored a header, securing the victory for his team at Livorno. Torino was promoted to Serie A at the end of the season. On 22 June 2012, Torino bought him outright from Genoa for €600,000. On 27 January 2013, he scored a brace at the San Siro against Inter, ending 2–2. He concluded the season with 3 goals in 31 appearances.

=== Chievo ===
On 4 July 2014, he signed a two-year contract, with an option for a third, with Chievo. He scored his first goal for Chievo at home against Empoli, in the match in which he debuted with Chievo. On 8 December, he scored with a fantastic bicycle kick against Cagliari, then was decisive in a 2–1 encounter won against Sampdoria, scoring his club's second goal after a 50-metre dribbling run.

=== Vicenza ===
On 15 July 2020 he signed a 1-year contract with an option for extension with Vicenza.

=== Amateur levels ===
On 7 September 2022, Meggiorini joined amateur side San Giovanni Lupatoto.

== International career ==
He made one appearance for the Italy U-19 team and two for the U-20.

== Honours ==
Spezia

- Coppa Italia Serie C: 2005
