= Alessandro Marchi =

Italian footballer (born 1989)

Personal information
- Date of birth: 7 December 1989 (age 36)
- Place of birth: Urbino, Italy
- Height: 1.79 m (5 ft 10 1/2 in)
- Position: Right midfielder

Team information
- Current team: Roma City

Senior career*
Years	Team	Apps	(Gls)
2009–2010	Rimini	19	(0)
2010–2012	Piacenza	65	(4)
2012–2014	Bologna	0	(0)
2012–2013	→ Frosinone (loan)	16	(1)
2013–2014	→ Catanzaro (loan)	25	(2)
2014–2015	Cremonese	35	(2)
2015–2016	Pavia	29	(0)
2016–2018	Livorno	22	(1)
2018	Sambenedettese	16	(1)
2018–2019	Vis Pesaro	18	(0)
2019–2021	Rieti	55	(2)
2021–2022	Arezzo	20	(4)
2022–2024	Flaminia	62	(8)
2024–	Roma City	10	(0)
- * Club domestic league appearances and goals as of 10 November 2024

Alessandro Marchi (born 7 December 1989) is an Italian footballer who plays for Serie D club Roma City.

== Biography ==
=== Rimini ===
Born in Urbino, Marche, Marchi started his professional career with Emilia–Romagna side Rimini. On 17 March 2009, he made his Serie B debut, substituted Emilio Docente in the 71st minute. The match Rimini 1–1 drew with Livorno. He followed the team relegated to 2009–10 Lega Pro Prima Divisione, but the club went bankrupt in July 2010.

=== Piacenza ===
In July 2010, Marchi was signed by Piacenza. After a few substitute appearances, he became the first choice after Armando Madonna, the coach changed the tactic from 4231/451 to 433 formation, as a right midfielder, ahead Luca Tremolada. Eventually, he made 27 starts. He followed the team relegated to 2011–12 Lega Pro Prima Divisione.

=== Bologna ===
On 24 January 2012, Marchi was sold to Bologna F.C. 1909 in a co-ownership deal for €65,000 in a 4-year contract, worth €86,717 in net a season. He returned to Piacenza for the rest of season on loan. In June 2012, Bologna acquired Marchi for free.

On 31 August 2012 Marchi was signed by Frosinone.

In July 2013, the Bologna F.C. announced that it had reached an agreement with the Catanzaro for the transfer on loan of Marchi with the right of redemption.

=== Cremonese ===
On 17 July 2014, Marchi was signed by Cremonese for free. On 3 July 2015 Marchi was released in a mutual consent.

=== Pavia ===
In summer 2015, Marchi was signed by Pavia. He made his debut on 15 July in a friendly match.

=== Livorno ===
After the bankruptcy of Pavia, Marchi joined Livorno.

=== Rieti ===
On 17 January 2019, he signed a two-year contract with Rieti.
