= Federico Casarini =

Italian footballer

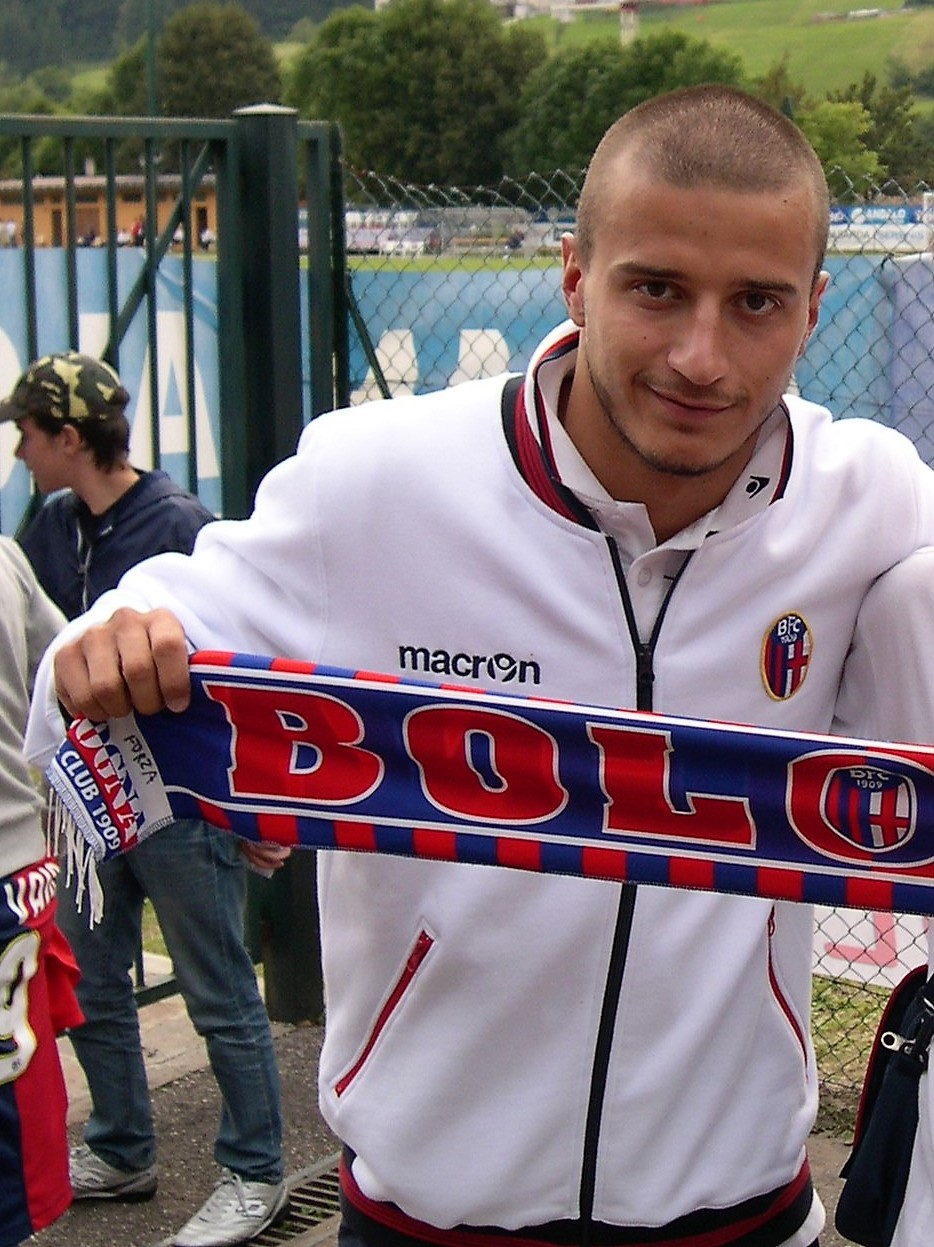
- Federico Casarini in 2011

Personal information
- Date of birth: 7 September 1989 (age 37)
- Place of birth: Carpi, Italy
- Height: 1.81 m (5 ft 11 in)
- Position: Midfielder

Team information
- Current team: Carpi
- Number: 11

Youth career
- Bologna

Senior career*
Years	Team	Apps	(Gls)
2008–2015	Bologna	101	(1)
2012–2013	→ Cagliari (loan)	11	(1)
2013–2014	→ Virtus Lanciano (loan)	35	(2)
2015–2019	Novara	102	(4)
2018–2019	→ Ascoli (loan)	20	(0)
2019–2022	Alessandria	87	(6)
2022–2024	Avellino	45	(3)
2024–2025	Turris	30	(1)
2025–	Carpi	48	(6)

International career
2006	Italy U-17	3	(0)
2007	Italy U-18	3	(0)
2009	Italy U-20	2	(0)
- * Club domestic league appearances and goals as of 30 April 2026

Federico Casarini (born 7 September 1989) is an Italian professional footballer who plays as a midfielder for Serie C Group A side Carpi.

== Club career ==
Casarini made his Serie A debut for Bologna in a 2–1 victory away to Catania, on 18 January 2009. On 1 September 2010, Casarini signed a new five-year contract worth €250,000 a season (€447,258 in gross)

On 16 September 2015, Casarini was signed by Serie B newcomers Novara Calcio. He took the no.7 shirt from Dario Bergamelli, who left for Catania on the same day.

On 26 August 2019, he signed a three-year contract with Serie C club Alessandria.

On 18 August 2022, Casarini joined Avellino.
