= Federico Rodríguez =

Uruguayan footballer (born 1991)

Personal information
- Full name: Federico Martín Rodríguez Rodríguez
- Date of birth: 3 April 1991 (age 35)
- Place of birth: Montevideo, Uruguay
- Height: 1.85 m (6 ft 1 in)
- Position: Forward

Team information
- Current team: Cerrito
- Number: 31

Senior career*
Years	Team	Apps	(Gls)
2010–2011	Bella Vista	15	(10)
2011	Peñarol	0	(0)
2011	Genoa	0	(0)
2011–2015	Bologna	1	(0)
2012	→ Piacenza (loan)	15	(3)
2013	→ Montevideo Wanderers (loan)	23	(5)
2015	Locarno	9	(2)
2015–2018	Boston River	49	(21)
2018–2019	Danubio	40	(10)
2019–2020	Alianza Lima	24	(9)
2021	Maldonado	5	(0)
2021–2022	Cerrito	18	(3)
2022–2023	Albion	26	(5)
2023	Bella Vista	17	(6)
2023	Progreso	6	(1)
2024–	Cerrito		

International career
2010–2011	Uruguay U20	3	(1)
- * Club domestic league appearances and goals

Federico Martín Rodríguez Rodríguez (born 3 April 1991) is a Uruguayan footballer who plays as a forward for Cerrito. He represented Uruguay U20 national team.

Rodríguez also holds Spanish nationality, it made him unrestricted to be register as a player of Serie A club despite born outside the European Union.

== Club career ==
On 30 January 2011 Rodríguez was signed by Italian Serie A club Genoa for €4.12 million from Peñarol. In June 2011 he was swapped directly with Riccardo Meggiorini, both 50% registration rights were "valued" €3 million. He signed a 4-year contract. On 25 January 2012 he was signed by Piacenza. In January 2013 he was signed by Montevideo Wanderers. On 21 June Bologna acquired Rodríguez for free and Robert Acquafresca outright from Genoa for €1.267 million.

Rodríguez was released on 21 January 2015, 6 months early from his contract. He joined FC Lugano immediately.

== International career ==
He has been capped by the Uruguay national under-20 football team for the 2011 South American Youth Championship and for the 2011 FIFA U-20 World Cup.

=== International goals ===
No.	Date	Venue	Opponent	Score	Result	Competition	Ref.
1.	19 January 2011	Estadio Monumental Virgen de Chapi, Arequipa, Peru	Venezuela	1–1	1–1	2011 South American Youth Championship	
2.	7 July 2011	Estádio Brinco de Ouro da Princesa, Campinas, Brazil	Saudi Arabia	3–0	3–0	Friendly	
