= Roger Carvalho =

Brazilian footballer

Personal information
- Full name: Roger de Carvalho
- Date of birth: 10 December 1986 (age 39)
- Place of birth: Arapongas, Brazil
- Height: 1.84 m (6 ft 0 in)
- Position: Centre back

Team information
- Current team: Água Santa
- Number: 4

Youth career
- 2006–2007: Iraty

Senior career*
Years	Team	Apps	(Gls)
2007–2008	Iraty	0	(0)
2007	→ Rio Branco (PR) (loan)	2	(0)
2008–2023	Tombense	72	(0)
2008	→ Olivais e Moscavide (loan)	6	(0)
2009	→ Guarani (MG) (loan)	6	(0)
2009–2011	→ Figueirense (loan)	91	(5)
2012	→ Genoa (loan)	9	(0)
2012–2013	→ Bologna (loan)	8	(0)
2013–2014	→ São Paulo (loan)	2	(0)
2014	→ Vitória (loan)	20	(0)
2015	→ Botafogo (loan)	32	(7)
2016	→ Palmeiras (loan)	7	(0)
2017	→ Atlético Goianiense (loan)	35	(1)
2018–2020	→ Fortaleza (loan)	61	(2)
2024–	Água Santa	3	(0)
- * Club domestic league appearances and goals as of 28 October 2020

Roger de Carvalho (born 10 December 1986), known as Roger Carvalho, is a Brazilian footballer who plays as a central defender for Água Santa.

== Biography ==
Carvalho was signed by Iraty in January 2007. He signed a two-year contract with Iraty in November 2006 and was loaned to Rio Branco for 2007 Paraná state football championship. He then transferred to Tombense, a proxy club for the investees where he was immediately loaned to Portuguese Second Division club Olivais e Moscavide. In January 2009, he returned to Brazil for Guarani (MG). The team finished as the least in 2009 Minas Gerais state championship.

=== Figueirense ===
Carvalho came to Figueirense in May 2009, and helped the team get promoted to the first division the following year, as 2010 runner-up. Roger played 27 games in 2011 first division, starting 20 times. With Tombense, he also signed a new three-year contract effective on 1 January 2010. He was loaned to Figueirense in January 2010, May 2010, and again in January 2011.

=== Genoa ===
On 31 January 2012, Carvalho was loaned to Italian Serie A club Genoa C.F.C. He took the number #3 shirt from departed Dario Dainelli. Roger is a dual Brazil-European Union citizen, thus he was not restricted by the non-EU policy of the FIGC. He made his debut on 15 February 2012 after Kakha Kaladze was suspended.

=== São Paulo ===
On 21 August 2013, Carvalho was loaned to São Paulo FC until the 2014 Campeonato Paulista Finals. Tricolor paid a contract fee of €3 million for the defender. However, his opportunities to play at São Paulo were diminished by two factors: the possible return of Rafael Toloi (on loan to AS Roma), and the awaited arrival of Breno Borges (signed pending adjudication of a court sentence in Germany).

=== Vitória ===
Roger Carvalho joined Vitória on 29 July 2014. The defender stayed at the club until the end of the year.

=== Botafogo ===
On 3 January 2015, Roger Carvalho was signed by Botafogo.

== Honours ==
Botafogo

- Campeonato Brasileiro Série B: 2015

Palmeiras

- Campeonato Brasileiro Série A: 2016
