= Saphir Taïder =

Algerian footballer (born 1992)

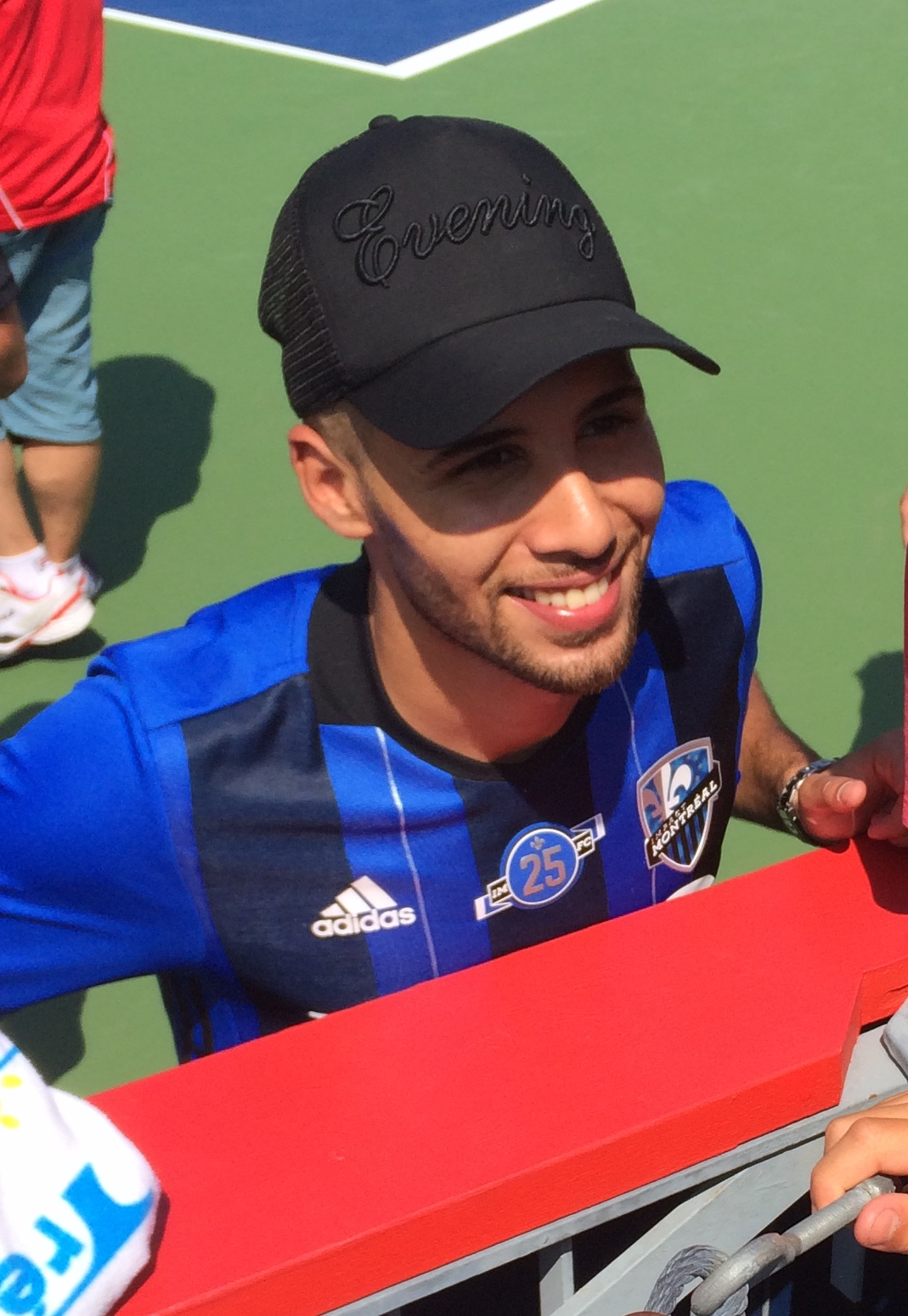
- Taïder with Montreal Impact in 2018

Personal information
- Full name: Saphir Sliti Taïder
- Date of birth: 29 February 1992 (age 34)
- Place of birth: Castres, France
- Height: 1.80 m (5 ft 11 in)
- Position: Midfielder

Team information
- Current team: TFC
- Number: 10

Youth career
- 1998–2006: Castres FC
- 2006–2008: Albi
- 2008–2010: Grenoble

Senior career*
Years	Team	Apps	(Gls)
2010–2011	Grenoble	26	(1)
2011–2013	Bologna	48	(3)
2013–2015	Internazionale	25	(1)
2014	→ Southampton (loan)	0	(0)
2014–2015	→ Sassuolo (loan)	27	(3)
2015–2019	Bologna	62	(3)
2018–2019	→ Montreal Impact (loan)	65	(16)
2020	Montreal Impact	11	(4)
2020–2022	Al-Ain	7	(3)
2024–2025	Gulf United		
2025–	TFC	4	(0)

International career^{‡}
2010	France U18	2	(1)
2010–2011	France U19	7	(2)
2011–2012	France U20	3	(0)
2013–2019	Algeria	46	(5)
- * Club domestic league appearances and goals as of 8 February 2021 ‡ National team caps and goals as of 31 May 2019

Saphir Sliti Taïder (Arabic: سفير سليتي تايدر; born 29 February 1992) is a professional footballer who plays as a central midfielder for TFC. Born in France, he played for the Algeria national team.

After beginning professionally with Grenoble in 2010, Taïder spent most of his career in Italy, representing Bologna (two spells), Internazionale and Sassuolo. Over six and a half seasons, he made 172 appearances and scored 10 goals in Serie A.

Taïder represented his place of birth, France, in the youth international level. He made his senior debut for Algeria in 2013 and represented the nation at the 2014 FIFA World Cup and 2015 Africa Cup of Nations.

== Club career ==
=== Grenoble ===
Taïder made his professional debut with Grenoble on 15 May 2010 in a league match against Marseille. On 5 July 2010, he signed his first professional contract, agreeing to a three-year deal with Grenoble.

=== Bologna ===
Following Grenoble's relegation to the Championnat de France amateur 2, the fifth division of French football, due to financial problems in 2011, Taïder joined Italian club Bologna. He made his Serie A debut on 11 December 2011 as a substitute. On 16 January 2012, he made his first start in Serie A in the 1–1 draw against Napoli. A day later, it was announced Taïder was signed by Juventus on a co-ownership deal for €2,425,000 in which Frederik Sørensen heading the other way for €2.5 million, effectively made Bologna acquired 50% registration rights of Sørensen for €75,000 in a cash plus player deal. Taïder remained on loan at Bologna for the rest of 2011–12 season. In June 2012, Bologna bought back Taïder for €2.35 million, while Sørensen returned to Juventus in June 2014.

=== Inter ===
On 20 August 2013, Taïder joined Internazionale on a four-year contract for a €5.5 million transfer fee, plus the loan of Diego Laxalt. Bologna also retained 50% registration as part of the co-ownership deal. He made his debut for the Nerazzurri six days later in a 2–0 home victory against Genoa, coming on as a substitute for Ricky Álvarez in the 85th minute. He played 25 times in 2013–14 Serie A for Inter, scoring once in a 7–0 win at Sassuolo on 22 September. On 4 December, in his only Coppa Italia match of the season, he scored a first-half penalty in a 3–2 home win over Serie B club Trapani in the tournament's fourth round.

In June 2014, the co-ownership deal of Taïder between Bologna and Inter was renewed. However, on 1 July, Inter purchased him outright for a €2 million fee, with former Bologna youth product Lorenzo Paramatti returning to his parent club for a €1 million fee.

On 6 August 2014, Taïder joined English Premier League side Southampton on a season-long loan, in exchange for Dani Osvaldo. He played his only match three days later, replacing James Ward-Prowse in the 61st minute of a 1–0 home friendly defeat to Bayer Leverkusen.

The loan was terminated on 1 September 2014 and he was immediately loaned to Serie A side Sassuolo, as Southampton said he "failed to live up to the high levels of commitment expected of Southampton players". He made his debut 13 days later, replacing Simone Missiroli at half-time as Sassuolo lost 7–0 to Inter at the San Siro.

=== Return to Bologna ===
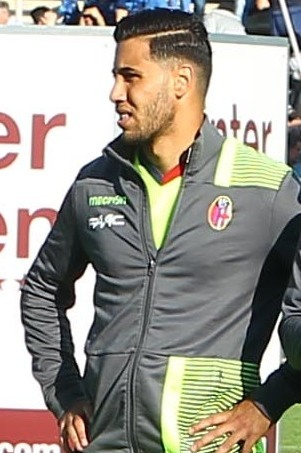
Taïder with Bologna in 2017

On 31 August 2015, Bologna re-signed Taïder on a two-year loan, with an obligation to purchase him outright for an undisclosed fee. Inter also write-down the value of the contact of Taïder to €2.5 million backdated to 30 June 2015. At Bologna, he also joined fellow Inter teammate Lorenzo Crisetig, who was signed under the same loan plus obligation deal in July 2015. According to Bologna, the club acquired Taïder for a €2 million transfer fee plus an additional €500,000 as a loan fee for the 2016–17 season. Bologna acquired Taïder on loan for free in 2015–16 season.

Taïder played 29 and 24 times for Bologna in Serie A in 2015–16 and 2016–17 season respectively, scoring three goals.

=== Montreal Impact ===
On 22 January 2018, Taïder signed a three-year deal at Major League Soccer (MLS) club Montreal Impact, starting with a two-year loan and the option of a fourth year. He joined as a Designated Player. He made his debut on 7 March as the season began with a 2–1 loss at fellow Canadians Vancouver Whitecaps FC in what was also the first match for Impact manager Rémi Garde. A month later, he received a straight red card in the 14th minute of a 4–0 loss at the New England Revolution for a foul on Luis Caicedo. He scored his first goal for the Impact on 28 April, albeit in a 4–1 defeat away to Atlanta United FC.

On 21 November 2019, Montreal opted to make his move permanent.

=== Al-Ain ===
On 14 October 2020, signed with Al-Ain ahead of their inaugural season in the Saudi Professional League.

=== Gulf United ===
On 28 August 2024, signed with Gulf United.

== International career ==
Taïder played for France at U18, U19 and U20 level. On 26 March 2013, Taïder scored on his debut for Algeria against Benin.

At the 2014 FIFA World Cup, Taïder played the entirety of Algeria's opening group match, a 2–1 defeat to Belgium. He did not feature again until the round of 16, playing the first 78 minutes of a loss to Germany by the same score after extra time in Porto Alegre.

Taïder was chosen in coach Christian Gourcuff's Algerian squad for the 2015 Africa Cup of Nations in Equatorial Guinea. He played every match as they were eliminated in the quarter-finals by eventual winners Ivory Coast.

== Personal life ==
Taïder was born in France to a Tunisian father and an Algerian mother. He is the younger brother of Tunisian international Nabil Taïder.

== Career statistics ==
=== Club ===
As of 21 September 2020

Appearances and goals by club, season and competition
Club	Season	League			Cup		Continental		Other		Total	
Club	Season	Division	Apps	Goals	Apps	Goals	Apps	Goals	Apps	Goals	Apps	Goals
Grenoble	2009–10	Ligue 1	1	0	—		—		—		1	0
Grenoble	2010–11	Ligue 2	25	1	1	0	—		—		26	1
Grenoble	Total		26	1	1	0	—		—		27	1
Bologna	2011–12	Serie A	14	0	2	0	—		—		16	0
Bologna	2012–13	Serie A	34	3	1	2	—		—		35	5
Bologna	Total		48	3	3	2	—		—		51	5
Internazionale	2013–14	Serie A	25	1	1	1	—		—		26	2
Sassuolo (loan)	2014–15	Serie A	27	3	0	0	—		—		27	3
Bologna (loan)	2015–16	Serie A	29	0	0	0	—		—		29	0
Bologna (loan)	2016–17	Serie A	24	3	2	1	—		—		26	4
Bologna (loan)	Total		53	3	2	1	—		—		55	4
Bologna	2017–18	Serie A	9	0	1	0	—		—		10	0
Montreal Impact (loan)	2018	MLS	33	7	2	0	—		—		35	7
Montreal Impact (loan)	2019	MLS	32	9	5	1	—		—		37	10
Montreal Impact (loan)	Total		65	16	7	1	2	1	—		72	17
Montreal Impact	2020	MLS	12	4	0	0	2 (Note: All appearance(s) in CONCACAF Champions League)	1	—		7	4
Career total			265	31	15	5	2	1	—		281	37

=== International goals ===
Scores and results list Algeria's goal tally first, score column indicates score after each Taïder goal.

List of international goals scored by Saphir Taïder
No.	Date	Venue	Opponent	Score	Result	Competition
1	26 March 2013	Stade Mustapha Tchaker, Blida, Algeria	Benin	2–1	3–1	2014 FIFA World Cup qualification
2	16 June 2013	Stade Amahoro, Kigali, Rwanda	Rwanda	1–0	1–0	2014 FIFA World Cup qualification
3	5 March 2014	Stade Mustapha Tchaker, Blida, Algeria	Slovenia	2–0	2–0	Friendly match
4	25 March 2016	Stade Mustapha Tchaker, Blida, Algeria	Ethiopia	5–0	7–1	2017 Africa Cup of Nations qualification
5	4 September 2016	Stade Mustapha Tchaker, Blida, Algeria	Lesotho	3–0	6–0	2017 Africa Cup of Nations qualification

== Honours ==
Montreal Impact

- Canadian Championship: 2019
