= Giuseppe Nazzani =

Italian American soccer player

Personal information
- Date of birth: 27 June 1990 (age 36)
- Place of birth: Carpi, Italy
- Position: Defender

Youth career
- 2001–2009: Bologna

Senior career*
Years	Team	Apps	(Gls)
2009–2013	Bologna	0	(0)
2009–2010	→ Figline (loan)	6	(0)
2010	→ Bellaria–Igea (loan)	10	(0)
2010–2011	→ Gubbio (loan)	8	(0)
2012	→ Ebolitana (loan)	12	(2)
2012–2013	→ Giacomense (loan)	20	(0)
- * Club domestic league appearances and goals

Giuseppe Nazzani (born 27 June 1990) is a former Italian American professional football (soccer) player who played in the third and fourth tiers of football in Italy.

== Career ==
Nazzani made his senior football debut during the 2009–10 season by going on loan with Lega Pro Prima Divisione club Figline and then Lega Pro Seconda Divisione club Bellaria Igea. The following season, he went on loan again, this time with Gubbio.

In January 2012 he was signed by Ebolitana. Nazzani left for Giacomense on 12 July 2012. On 30 June 2013 Bologna terminated the contract with Nazzani in a mutual consent.

== International ==
Nazzani grew up in Italy but holds an American passport. In 2008, Thomas Rongen called him into a camp with the US under-20 team. Ultimately, Nazzani was not selected for the US team for the 2009 U-20 World Cup.
