= Andrea Raimondi =

Italian footballer (born 1990)

Personal information
- Date of birth: 26 June 1990 (age 36)
- Place of birth: Padua, Italy
- Height: 1.73 m (5 ft 8 in)
- Position: Forward

Team information
- Current team: Delta Rovigo

Youth career
- Padova

Senior career*
Years	Team	Apps	(Gls)
2008–2014	Padova	25	(4)
2009–2010	→ Sangiovannese (loan)	42	(7)
2010–2012	→ Juve Stabia (loan)	26	(2)
2014	Trapani	3	(0)
2014–2015	Venezia	29	(8)
2015–2016	Cosenza	18	(0)
2016	Benevento	3	(0)
2017	Vigontina	1	(0)
2017–2018	ArzignanoChiampo	29	(13)
2018–2019	Campodarsego	33	(7)
2019–	Delta Rovigo	10	(1)

International career
2006	Italy U16	13	(0)
2006	Italy U17	5	(1)
2011	Italy U21 Serie B	2	(0)
- * Club domestic league appearances and goals as of 15:42, 28 November 2019 (UTC)

Andrea Raimondi (born 26 June 1990) is an Italian footballer who plays for Italian club A.C. Delta Calcio Rovigo.

== Biography ==
Born in Padua, Veneto, Raimondi started his career at Calcio Padova. In January 2009 he left for Sangiovannese. In July 2009, the temporary deal was renewed as Padova was promoted to 2009–10 Serie B. In August 2010 he was signed by Juve Stabia. Raimondi won promotion again as playoffs winner. In July 2011 Raimondi's temporary deal was renewed again.

=== International career ===
Raimondi played twice in 2007 UEFA European Under-17 Football Championship qualification. In 2011–12 season Raimondi capped twice for Italy under-21 Serie B representative team.
