= Mikael Antonsson =

Swedish footballer

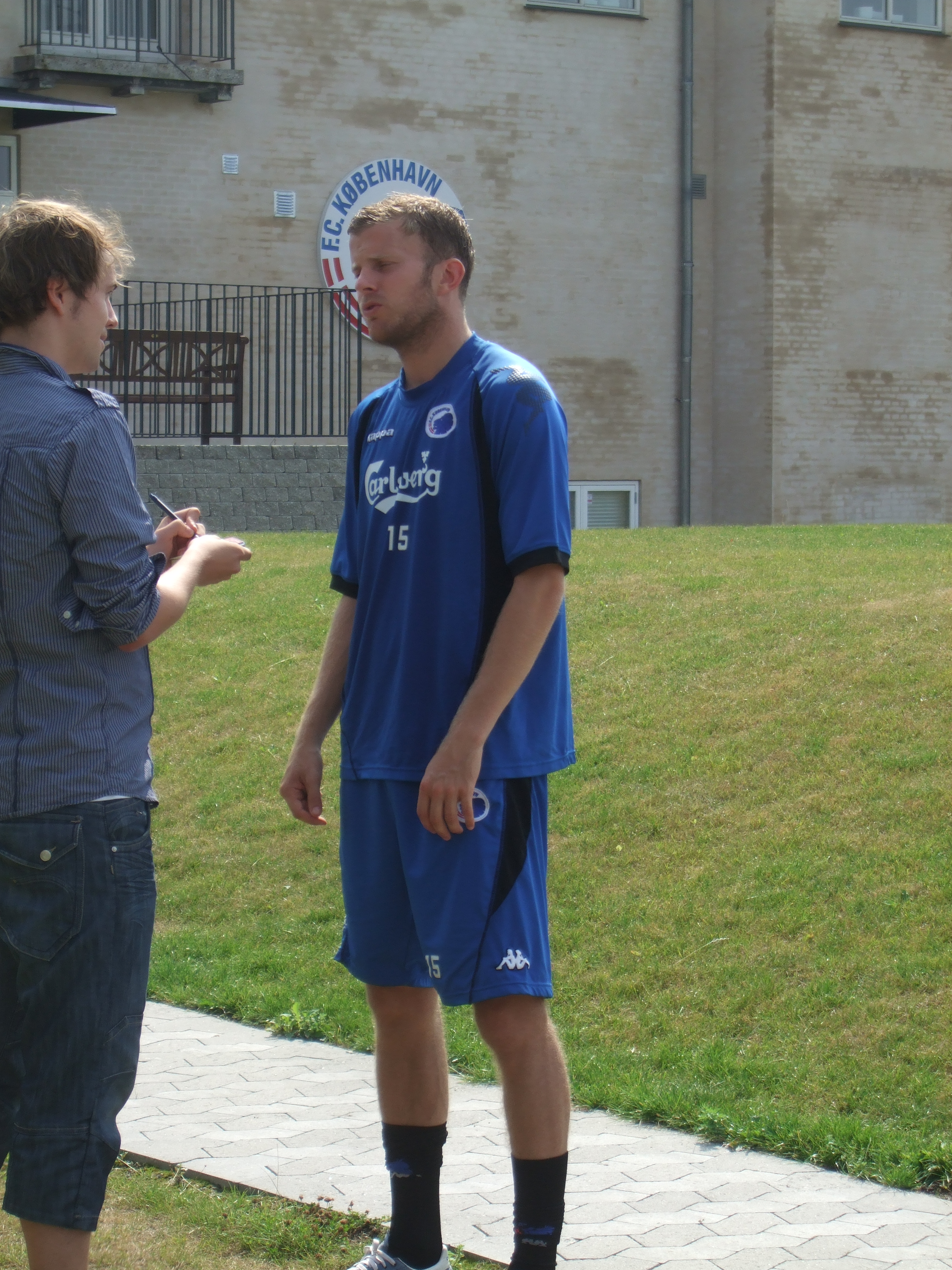

Personal information
- Full name: Mikael Antonsson
- Date of birth: 31 May 1981 (age 45)
- Place of birth: Karlskrona, Sweden
- Height: 1.89 m (6 ft 2 in)
- Position: Centre back

Team information
- Current team: Copenhagen (assistant)

Youth career
- 1989–1995: Sillhövda AIK

Senior career*
Years	Team	Apps	(Gls)
1996–1997	Sillhövda AIK	28	(8)
1997–2004	IFK Göteborg	52	(0)
2004–2006	Austria Wien	28	(0)
2006–2007	Panathinaikos	7	(0)
2007–2011	Copenhagen	86	(2)
2011–2014	Bologna	89	(0)
2014–2018	Copenhagen	45	(0)
2024–2025	AIK Atlas	14	(1)
Total		335	(10)

International career
1997–1998	Sweden U16	18	(2)
1999	Sweden U18	9	(0)
2002–2004	Sweden U21	20	(1)
2004–2015	Sweden	28	(0)

Managerial career
- 2017–: Copenhagen (assistant)
- * Club domestic league appearances and goals

Mikael Antonsson (born 31 May 1981) is a Swedish former professional footballer who played as a defender. He currently works for the Danish Superliga side F.C. Copenhagen as assistant manager. As a player, he played professionally in Sweden, Austria, Greece, Italy, and Denmark during a career that spanned between 1996 and 2018. A full international between 2004 and 2015, he won 28 caps for the Sweden national team and was a part of their UEFA Euro 2012 squad.

== Club career ==
Antonsson was born in Karlskrona. He began his career in a local Swedish team called Sillhövda AIK (1996) and after two years he was transferred to Swedish champions IFK Göteborg. He played there until 2004, when Austria Wien bought him for €450,000. In January 2006 Panathinaikos brought him in Athens to play for them on a 2-year contract. In the summer 2007 he moved to the Danish champions F.C. Copenhagen.

Mikael Antonsson started the season 2010–11 impressively with new teammate, Sölvi Ottesen, which reminded fans of former steady partnership between Michael Gravgaard and Brede Hangeland. In the 2–0 win against former club and Greek champions Panathinaikos, Antonsson chosen for the Goal.com Champions League "Team of the Round".

In 2011, Antonsson moved to Bologna in the Italian Serie A on a free transfer before wrapping up his career in Copenhagen between 2014 and his retirement in 2018.

In 2024 Antonsson announced that he will make a comeback by playing for the Swedish tier 4 football club AIK Atlas.

== International career ==
Antonsson won 28 caps between 2004 and 2015 and represented Sweden at UEFA Euro 2012.

== Career statistics ==
=== International ===
Appearances and goals by national team and year
National team	Year	Apps	Goals
Sweden	2004	1	0
Sweden	2005	0	0
Sweden	2006	2	0
Sweden	2007	0	0
Sweden	2008	0	0
Sweden	2009	0	0
Sweden	2010	0	0
Sweden	2011	1	0
Sweden	2012	2	0
Sweden	2013	9	0
Sweden	2014	8	0
Sweden	2015	5	0
Total		28	0

== Honours ==
Austria Wien

- Austrian Bundesliga: 2005–06
- Austrian Cup: 2004–05, 2005–06

Copenhagen

- Danish Superliga: 2008–09, 2009–10, 2010–11, 2015–16, 2016–17
- Danish Cup: 2008–09, 2014–15, 2015–16, 2016–17

Individual

- Årets Ärkeängel: 2003
