= Nicolò Cherubin =

Italian footballer

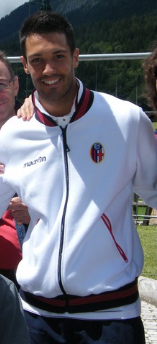
- Cherubin with Bologna

Personal information
- Date of birth: 2 December 1986 (age 39)
- Place of birth: Vicenza, Italy
- Height: 1.88 m (6 ft 2 in)
- Position: Defender

Team information
- Current team: Luparense (assistant coach)

Senior career*
Years	Team	Apps	(Gls)
2003–2007	Cittadella	49	(3)
2007–2008	Reggina	6	(0)
2008	Avellino	8	(0)
2008–2010	Cittadella	78	(1)
2010–2017	Bologna	77	(3)
2014–2016	→ Atalanta (loan)	27	(1)
2016–2017	→ Verona (loan)	5	(0)
2017–2019	Verona	0	(0)
2018	→ Ascoli (loan)	10	(0)
2019–2020	Padova	18	(0)
2020–2021	Arezzo	22	(0)
2021–2022	Luparense	20	(1)

Managerial career
- 2022: Luparense
- * Club domestic league appearances and goals as of 19 December 2022

Nicolò Cherubin (born 2 December 1986) is an Italian football coach and former player, who played as a defender. He is the current assistant coach of Serie D club Luparense.

== Playing career ==
=== Bologna ===
Cherubin joined Bologna in July 2010 for €1.5 million fee. Cherubin spent two seasons on loan at Atalanta B.C. from 2014 to 2016. He returned to Bologna on 1 July 2016, receiving a call-up from the coach. However, he only appeared as an unused substitute in that match.

=== Verona ===
On 31 August 2016, Cherubin joined Verona on a season-long loan deal, with an obligation to make the deal permanent. As part of the deal, Filip Helander moved to Bologna.

On 12 June 2017, Cherubin joined Verona on a definitive basis.

=== Padova ===
On 9 January 2019, Cherubin joined Padova.

== Coaching career ==
On 11 June 2022, Cherubin was formally appointed as the new assistant coach of Serie D club Luparense, after having served as a player and then as a technical collaborator for previous head coach Nicola Zanini during the 2021–22 season.

On 19 December 2022, Cherubin was promoted as head coach of Luparense, replacing Mauro Zironelli in charge of the first team, but was then moved back to his assistant job eight days later as Zironelli was reappointed in charge.
