= Archimede Morleo =

Italian footballer (born 1983)

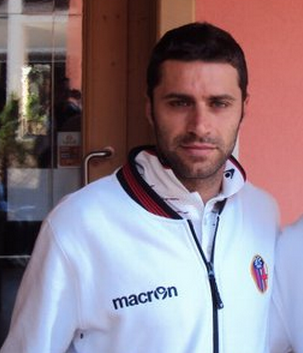

Personal information
- Date of birth: 26 September 1983 (age 43)
- Place of birth: Mesagne, Italy
- Height: 1.72 m (5 ft 7 1/2 in)
- Position: Left-back

Team information
- Current team: Casarano

Youth career
- 2000–2002: Lecce

Senior career*
Years	Team	Apps	(Gls)
2002–2003	Carrarese	12	(0)
2003–2005	Sora	58	(3)
2005–2006	Cisco Roma	28	(0)
2006–2008	Catanzaro	43	(2)
2008–2010	Crotone	68	(6)
2010–2017	Bologna	132	(1)
2017–2018	Bari	11	(0)
2019–	Casarano		
- * Club domestic league appearances and goals as of 9 February 2019

Archimede Morleo (Italian: [arkiˈmeːde morˈleːo]; born 26 September 1983) is a former Italian footballer who last played for Eccellenza Apulia club Casarano.

== Biography ==
=== Lega Pro clubs ===
Born in Mesagne, Apulia, Morleo started his career at Apulian team Lecce. In the 2002–03 season, he was loaned to Serie C1 club Carrarese. Morleo then spent the 2003–04 Serie C1 season with Sora, and the club bought him on co-ownership deal at the end of season. Sora went bankrupt after the end of the 2004–05 Serie C1 season. Morleo then moved to Cisco Roma of Serie C2.

In 2006, he left for fellow Serie C2 side Catanzaro. In August 2007, he was signed by Serie A side Udinese from Cisco Roma but sold him back to Catanzaro in another co-ownership deal. He missed the first few months of the 2007–08 Serie C2 season due to injury and only played 14 times in Serie C2.

=== Crotone ===
In June 2008, Udinese bought him back and re-sold Morleo to Lega Pro Prima Divisione (ex-Serie C1) side Crotone. He won the promotion playoffs in June 2009 with the team and was promoted to Serie B. Crotone also bought the remaining 50% registration rights from Udinese. He started 32 times in the 2009–10 Serie B season as Crotone finished 8th.

=== Bologna ===
In July 2010, he was signed by Serie A club Bologna in another co-ownership deal for €400,000.

In June 2011, Bologna acquired Morleo outright for another €550,000.

=== Bari ===
After spending seven years with Bologna, he departed the club in the 2017 January transfer window for Serie B side Bari.
