= Henry Giménez =

Uruguayan footballer (born 1986)

Personal information
- Full name: Henry Damián Giménez Báez
- Date of birth: 13 March 1986 (age 40)
- Place of birth: Durazno, Uruguay
- Height: 1.76 m (5 ft 9 in)
- Positions: Winger; striker

Team information
- Current team: Huracán

Senior career*
Years	Team	Apps	(Gls)
2005	Fénix	13	(2)
2005–2006	Tacuarembó	26	(2)
2007–2009	River Plate de Montevideo	66	(28)
2009–2014	Bologna	60	(6)
2012–2013	→ Grosseto (loan)	15	(1)
2014–2015	→ Nacional (loan)	17	(2)
2015	Universitario	7	(0)
2015	Mushuc Runa	5	(0)
2016	Tractor Sazi	0	(0)
2016	Gżira United	0	(0)
2017	Deportivo Maldonado	24	(2)
2018	Oriental	20	(3)
2019	Villa Teresa	14	(0)
2021–	Huracán		

International career
2008	Uruguay	2	(0)
- * Club domestic league appearances and goals as of 21:15, 16 January 2024 (UTC)

Henry Damián Giménez Báez (born 13 March 1986) is an Uruguayan professional footballer who plays as a winger for Huracán.

== Club career ==
Born in Durazno, Giménez began his career in Uruguay playing for Centro Atlético Fénix and later in Tacuarembó F.C.

In early 2007, he was transferred River Plate de Montevideo, team were his outstanding performances help them reach the semifinals of the 2009 Copa Sudamericana.

On 2 September 2009, he signed a new deal with Italian side Bologna F.C. 1909. He made his Serie A debut on 8 November 2009 playing 12 minutes against U.S. Città di Palermo.

== International career ==
Giménez has earned two caps for Uruguay in 2008. One against Turkey and another against Norway.
