= Frederik Sørensen =

Danish footballer (born 1992)

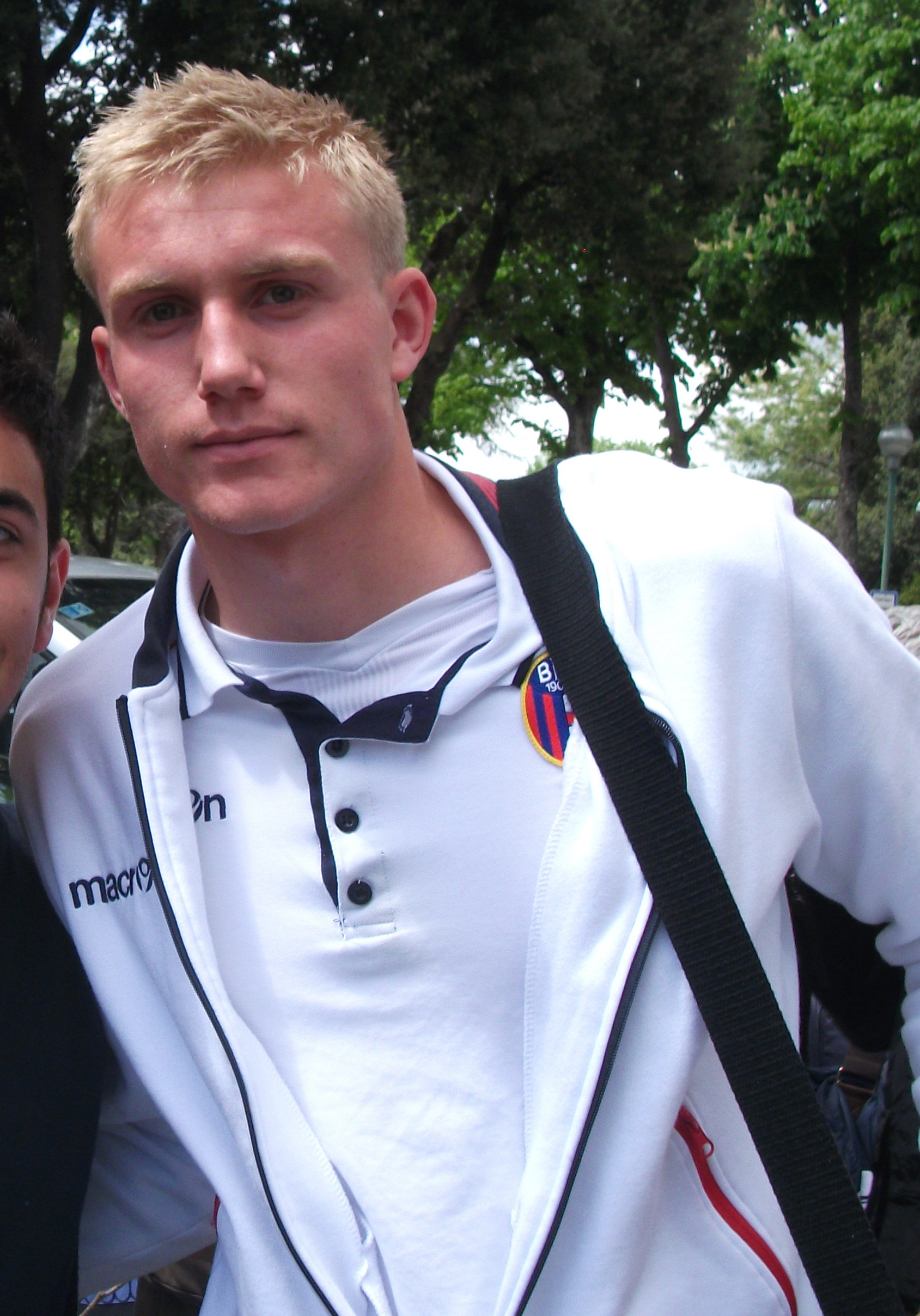

Personal information
- Full name: Frederik Hillersborg Sørensen
- Date of birth: 14 April 1992 (age 34)
- Place of birth: Copenhagen, Denmark
- Height: 1.94 m (6 ft 4 1/2 in)
- Position: Defender

Team information
- Current team: Union Brescia
- Number: 4

Youth career
- 2001–2003: KFUM Roskilde
- 2003–2004: Himmelev–Veddelev
- 2004–2007: FC Roskilde
- 2007–2010: Lyngby BK

Senior career*
Years	Team	Apps	(Gls)
2010–2012	Juventus	17	(0)
2012–2014	Bologna	42	(2)
2014–2015	Juventus	0	(0)
2014–2015	→ Hellas Verona (loan)	10	(0)
2015–2021	FC Köln	89	(2)
2019–2020	→ Young Boys (loan)	8	(0)
2021	Pescara	11	(0)
2021–2024	Ternana	77	(5)
2025	Feralpisalò	3	(2)
2025–	Union Brescia	29	(1)

International career^{‡}
2008–2009	Denmark U17	4	(0)
2011–2012	Denmark U20	1	(0)
2011–2015	Denmark U21	15	(0)
2017	Denmark	1	(0)
- * Club domestic league appearances and goals as of 29 April 2026 ‡ National team caps and goals as of 10:07, 21 January 2021 (UTC)

Frederik Hillersborg Sørensen (born 14 April 1992) is a Danish professional footballer who plays for Italian Serie C Group A club Union Brescia. His primary position is centre back but he can also play as a right back.

== Club career ==
=== Early career ===
Born in Copenhagen, Sørensen began playing football with hometown clubs KFUM Roskilde and FC Roskilde before joining Lyngby in 2007. After breaking into the first team, he was under contract until 2013.

=== Juventus ===
Sørensen officially signed for Juventus on 27 August 2010 after a trial with the Turin-based club in July of the same year. After injuries to Leandro Rinaudo and Zdeněk Grygera that would rule them out for several months, Sørensen was called up to the first team for the first time against Bologna on 23 October 2010, and against Milan.

=== Bologna ===
On 17 January 2012, Sørensen was officially sent to Bologna in a co-ownership deal for €2.5 million (initially in a cash-plus-player deal, for Saphir Taïder). Despite making just three league appearances for his new club during the remainder of the 2011–12 Serie A campaign, the young defender became an integral part of his club's first team throughout the 2012–13 Serie A season, after they had renewed the co-ownership agreement with Juventus.

=== Return to Juventus ===
On 20 June 2014, Sørensen was re-signed on a permanent basis by Juventus for €800,000. In August 2014, Sørensen started training with English side Leeds United ahead of completing a loan move to the club, but the move collapsed after a disagreement between the player's agent and Leeds owner Massimo Cellino, resulting him in returning to Juventus.

=== Hellas Verona (loan) ===
Sørensen officially signed for Hellas Verona on 29 August 2014 on a one-year loan deal for €300,000.

=== 1. FC Köln ===
In July 2015, German Bundesliga side 1. FC Köln signed Sørensen for €1.6 million. He quickly established himself as a starter in the centre of Köln's defence and, in January 2017, signed a contract extension until 2021. The team qualified for the 2017–18 UEFA Europa League but suffered relegation just one season later. On 16 January 2021, it was reported that the club had released Sørensen from his contract.

==== Loan to BSC Young Boys ====
On 18 August 2019, Sørensen was loaned out to Swiss club BSC Young Boys for the 2019–20 season.

=== Delfino Pescara 1936 ===
Having been released by 1.FC Köln, Sørensen joined Serie B club Pescara on a free transfer.

== International career ==
Sørensen has been capped four times for the Danish U17 team, twice against Portugal, and twice against Greece. He also played once for the U18 team in an unofficial friendly matches against Bavaria and Romania U18 as an unused substitute. He was a part of the Danish squad for the UEFA European Under-21 Championship, but he only played the first match and got injured as Denmark were eliminated after the group phase.

In June 2015, Sørensen was called up to the Danish senior squad for a friendly match against Montenegro. In 2017, he debuted against Germany during the 2018 FIFA World Cup qualification that ended in a 1–1 draw.
