= Robert Acquafresca =

Italian footballer (born 1987)

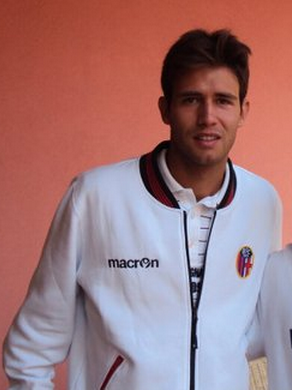
- Acquafresca with Bologna in 2011

Personal information
- Date of birth: 11 September 1987 (age 39)
- Place of birth: Turin, Italy
- Height: 1.84 m (6 ft 0 in)
- Position: Striker

Youth career
- 1993–2005: Torino

Senior career*
Years	Team	Apps	(Gls)
2005–2009	Inter Milan	0	(0)
2005–2007	→ Treviso (loan)	43	(11)
2007–2009	→ Cagliari (loan)	68	(24)
2009–2011	Genoa	10	(2)
2009–2010	→ Atalanta (loan)	12	(1)
2010–2011	→ Cagliari (loan)	37	(8)
2011–2017	Bologna	84	(9)
2013	→ Levante (loan)	13	(3)
2017	Ternana	6	(0)
2017–2019	Sion	7	(1)
Total		280	(59)

International career
2004–2005	Italy U17	2	(0)
2004–2005	Italy U18	5	(2)
2005–2006	Italy U19	3	(0)
2006–2007	Italy U20	4	(1)
2007–2009	Italy U21	16	(10)
2008	Italy U23	1	(0)
2008	Italy (Olympics)	4	(1)
- * Club domestic league appearances and goals

Robert Acquafresca (Italian pronunciation: [ˈrɔːbert akkwaˈfreska]; born 11 September 1987) is an Italian former professional footballer who played as a striker. He is a former Italy under-21 international and represented Italy at the 2008 Summer Olympics.

== Club career ==
=== Early career ===
Born in Turin to an Italian father and a Polish mother residing in Alpignano, Acquafresca entered the Torino youth system at the age of 6. In the 2004–05 Campionato Nazionale Primavera, he played 14 games and scored two goals for the granata.

In summer 2005, Torino was promoted back to Serie A; however, Torino was expelled from Serie A due to the club's financial problems, with the consequent free release of all of their players. He was signed by Internazionale as a youth team player, but two days later was loaned out to Treviso in a co-ownership deal for €35,000, in order to gain first team experience. At his new club, he partnered up with his former Torino teammate Pinga. Acquafresca made eight Serie A appearances in 2005–06 season. As part of the co-ownership deal, Acquafresca remained in Treviso for the 2006–07 Serie B season and scored 11 goals in 35 appearances. In June 2007, Inter bought back the other half of the co-ownership deal from Treviso, for €1.5 million.

=== Cagliari ===
Acquafresca was involved in the David Suazo transfer, which saw him move to Cagliari on a co-ownership deal for €100,000. There, he has played 36 games and scored fourteen goals.

On 25 June 2008, it was confirmed that Inter had bought Cagliari's 50% of Acquafresca for €6 million, making them his sole club; however he was loaned back to Cagliari for the 2008–09 season.

On 14 July 2008, Acquafresca revealed that he dreams of wearing the Inter shirt one day. He also thanked Cagliari for letting him grow as a football player so that he one-day could fulfill his Inter dream.

After missing the first game of the season against Lazio, Acquafresca then played the next five games without opening his account, before finally scoring his first goal of the season against Torino. He scored again in his team's next home match against Chievo. On 2 November he scored two goals at home against Bologna in a 5–1 win. He also scored one goal against his parent team, Inter, on 13 January 2009.

=== Genoa & Atalanta ===
On 29 June 2009, Acquafresca became a member of Genoa C.F.C. as a part of the deal that saw Diego Milito and Thiago Motta move to Internazionale, and moved along with Leonardo Bonucci, Francesco Bolzoni, Riccardo Meggiorini and Ivan Fatic. He was valued at €9.5 million at that time, signing a five-year contract. He was immediately loaned to Atalanta as the club had recently sold its striker Sergio Floccari to Genoa.

In January 2010 the Italian striker prematurely ended his loan spell at Atalanta and returned to Genoa, as the club completed a three player three club swap, which saw Hernán Crespo move to Parma, and Parma's Nicola Amoruso move to Atalanta.

=== Back to Cagliari ===
On 1 July 2010, Acquafresca's number 9 shirt was given to Luca Toni, and Acquafresca was transfer-listed by Genoa. After a loan negotiation, Acquafresca finally returned to Cagliari on loan for €2 million and took the number 9 shirt from Nenê. Cagliari also had an option to buy him after the loan.

On 22 June 2011, Cagliari announced that the club would not exercise the right to sign him outright, even though Acquafresca had been the flagship striker for Cagliari since the departure of Alessandro Matri in January 2011.

=== Bologna ===
On 19 July 2011, Acquafresca was loaned to Bologna for a €500,000 fee, in a 1+3 year contract worth €1.692 million in a season in gross. He was the joint-top-earner of Bologna that season.

Acquafresca re-joined coach Pierpaolo Bisoli, when in June 2011 the club sold its forward Riccardo Meggiorini back to Genoa and also signed Federico Rodríguez from Genoa. Acquafresca scored five goals in 20 Serie A games during his first season at the club. Bologna made Acquafresca's move permanent after the 2011–12 season, buying the player's remaining 50% registration rights for €2.5 million in a 5-year contract.

==== Loan to Levante ====
On 31 January 2013, Acquafresca left for Spanish club Levante UD, after a goal drought in six Serie A appearances during the 2012–13 season. In total he made 13 appearances in La Liga scoring 3 goals. In June 2013 Bologna acquired Rodríguez outright from Genoa for free, as well as Acquafresca for an additional €1.267 million. The deals made meant that Bologna had spent €4.267 in total to acquire Acquafresca as transfer fee.

==== Return to Bologna ====
Acquafresca returned to Bologna for the 2013–14 Serie A season; however, he made 19 appearances in Serie A without scoring a goal, while Bologna were relegated to Serie B at the end of the season.

In the 2016–17 pre-season Acquafresca was left out from the first team squad, partially due to a trauma in his knee. He only played for Bologna as a member of the reserve team against the first team on 20 August, along with fellow first team player Luca Ceccarelli who was released by the club on 31 August. Acquafresca's squad number was also changed to number 99. On 1 September, a sister website of La Gazzetta dello Sport reported that the player would be left out from the first team squad in his final year of contract.

=== Ternana ===
On 31 January 2017, Acquafresca was signed by Ternana.

== International career ==
Acquafresca has been capped for the Italian U-17, U18, U19, U20, and Under-21 sides, making his Italy Under-21 debut in a European qualifying match against Albania on 1 June 2007. The Polish Football Federation, together with Polish national coach Leo Beenhakker, had also tried to convince him to play for Poland. Acquafresca, who speaks Polish, in an interview given to Gazeta Wyborcza on 14 March 2008, said that he would leave the decision to the near future. On 18 March, he finally opted to refuse the Polish Football Federation offer, and instead confirmed his choice to represent Italy at international level.

With the national youth team, Acquafresca finished as the third placed team in group 6 in their 2006 UEFA European Under-19 Football Championship qualification campaign. With the Italian under-21 team, Acquafresca finished as the losing semi-finalist in the 2009 UEFA European Under-21 Football Championship, losing out 0–1 to eventual champions Germany.

With the Italy Olympic's team (de facto U21 team with overage player), Acquafresca took part at the 2008 Summer Olympics in Beijing, and finished as a losing quarter-finalist to Belgium; he scored 1 goal in 4 games throughout the tournament. Acquafresca also played for the Olympic team against Romania in a friendly match, as well as against Lega Pro club Borgo.
