= 1932–33 Prima Divisione =

Prima Divisione
- Season: 1932–33
- Promoted: Viareggio; Perugia; Foggia; Derthona; Seregno; Pavia; Vicenza; SPAL; Catanzaro
- Relegated: solely disbanded clubs

The 1932–33 Prima Divisione was the third level league of the 33rd Italian football championship.

In 1928, FIGC had decided a reform of the league structure of Italian football. The top-level league was the National Division, composed by the two divisions of Serie A and Serie B. Under them, there were the local championship, the major one being the First Division, that in 1935 will take the name of Serie C. Starting this season, the winners of the nine groups of First Division would be admitted to the final rounds, where three tickets of promotion to Serie B were available, whereas the scheduled relegations were annulled by the Federation which expanded the division, as the scheduled promotions were increased for an enlargement of next Serie B season. From this season, reserve teams of club belonging to Serie A were admitted in First Division.

== Girone A ==
=== Final classification ===
| Pos | Team | Pld | W | D | L | GF | GA | GD | Pts | Qualification or relegation |
|---|---|---|---|---|---|---|---|---|---|---|
| 1 | Pavia | 22 | 14 | 3 | 5 | 47 | 27 | +20 | 31 | Qualified |
| 2 | Pro Vercelli B | 22 | 13 | 4 | 5 | 41 | 19 | +22 | 30 | |
| 3 | Lecco | 22 | 11 | 5 | 6 | 43 | 34 | +9 | 27 | |
| 4 | Soresinese | 22 | 10 | 5 | 7 | 48 | 40 | +8 | 25 | |
| 5 | Juventus B | 22 | 9 | 5 | 8 | 52 | 35 | +17 | 23 | |
| 6 | Monza | 22 | 7 | 8 | 7 | 33 | 23 | +10 | 22 | |
| 7 | Gallaratese | 22 | 9 | 2 | 11 | 32 | 36 | −4 | 20 | |
| 7 | Varese | 22 | 7 | 6 | 9 | 35 | 42 | −7 | 20 | |
| 9 | Ambrosiana-Inter B | 22 | 6 | 7 | 9 | 40 | 43 | −3 | 19 | Renounced (Note: Renounced to play in 1933–34 Prima Divisione.) |
| 10 | Intra | 22 | 7 | 4 | 11 | 21 | 45 | −24 | 18 | |
| 11 | Pinerolo | 22 | 6 | 4 | 12 | 26 | 45 | −19 | 16 | |
| 12 | Falck Sesto S.G. | 22 | 5 | 3 | 14 | 22 | 51 | −29 | 13 | |
| 13 | Abbiategrasso (E) | 0 | – | – | – | – | – | — | 0 | Retired (Note: Retired after 18 matches. All their results were voided. A new phoenix club was created in Third Division.) |
| 14 | Codogno (E) | 0 | – | – | – | – | – | — | 0 | Retired (Note: Retired after 11 matches. All their results were voided. A new phoenix club was created in Third Division.) |

Source: Panini
(E) Eliminated

=== Results ===
| Home \ Away | ABB | AFA | AMB | COD | GLR | INT | JUV | LCO | MON | PAV | PIN | PVE | SOR | VAR |
|---|---|---|---|---|---|---|---|---|---|---|---|---|---|---|
| Abbiategrasso | | 1–0 | 1–7 | | | 1–3 | 0–4 | 0–0 | 1–2 | 0–1 | | | 0–0 | 0–0 |
| Acciaierie Falck | 3–1 | | 2–1 | 5–2 | 3–2 | 2–0 | 0–2 | 0–2 | 1–1 | 0–1 | 3–1 | 1–0 | 1–1 | 1–1 |
| Ambrosiana-Inter | | 2–1 | | 5–0 | 2–0 | 5–0 | 2–1 | 2–3 | 1–1 | 1–5 | 3–0 | 2–2 | 0–2 | 2–2 |
| Codogno | 3–1 | | | | | | 1–2 | 2–3 | | 1–2 | | 2–3 | 1–4 | |
| Gallaratese | 4–1 | 6–1 | 3–0 | 3–1 | | 1–0 | 2–3 | 2–0 | 0–0 | 3–2 | 3–1 | 1–0 | 3–2 | 2–1 |
| Intra | 3–1 | 2–1 | 0–4 | 2–1 | 1–1 | | 2–1 | 0–0 | 2–0 | 1–0 | 1–1 | 2–0 | 0–1 | 2–1 |
| Juventus | 2–0 | 7–2 | 0–0 | | 4–1 | 6–3 | | 2–3 | 0–0 | 2–3 | 3–1 | 0–1 | 1–1 | 9–2 |
| Lecco | 0–0 | 2–1 | 5–2 | | 3–0 | 3–0 | 2–2 | | 1–0 | 1–0 | 5–0 | 0–1 | 2–1 | 0–0 |
| Monza | | 3–0 | 2–2 | | 5–0 | 1–1 | 0–0 | 4–1 | | 2–1 | 6–1 | 1–0 | 1–2 | 2–0 |
| Pavia | 3–0 | 5–1 | 6–3 | | 1–0 | 2–0 | 1–0 | 2–2 | 3–1 | | 2–2 | 0–0 | 3–2 | 4–1 |
| Pinerolo | 1–0 | 3–1 | 2–1 | | 1–0 | 1–2 | 2–0 | 3–2 | 0–0 | 0–0 | | 3–3 | 1–2 | 2–1 |
| Pro Vercelli | 2–1 | 2–0 | 1–0 | | 1–0 | 3–0 | 3–0 | 5–2 | 2–0 | 2–0 | 3–0 | | 5–1 | 3–0 |
| Soresinese | | 5–1 | 4–4 | | 1–2 | 7–1 | 2–5 | 4–4 | 3–2 | 3–1 | 2–1 | 2–0 | | 0–0 |
| Varese | 2–1 | 2–0 | 1–1 | 3–0 | 3–1 | 4–1 | 2–4 | 3–0 | 2–1 | 1–3 | 1–0 | 4–4 | 3–0 | |

Updated to match(es) played on unknown. Source: Almanacco Illustrato del Calcio - La Storia 1898-2004, Panini Edizioni, Modena, September 2005 (in Italian)
Legend: Blue = home team win; Yellow = draw; Red = away team win.

== Girone B ==
=== Final classification ===
| Pos | Team | Pld | W | D | L | GF | GA | GD | Pts | Qualification or relegation |
|---|---|---|---|---|---|---|---|---|---|---|
| 1 | Milan B | 24 | 13 | 7 | 4 | 57 | 22 | +35 | 33 | Group winner |
| 2 | Torino B | 24 | 13 | 6 | 5 | 50 | 21 | +29 | 32 | |
| 3 | Seregno | 24 | 12 | 7 | 5 | 47 | 25 | +22 | 31 | Qualified |
| 4 | Cantù | 24 | 13 | 2 | 9 | 49 | 43 | +6 | 28 | |
| 5 | Pro Lissone | 24 | 10 | 5 | 9 | 41 | 35 | +6 | 25 | |
| 6 | Pro Patria B | 24 | 10 | 4 | 10 | 40 | 42 | −2 | 24 | Excluded (Note: Excluded from 1933–34 Prima Divisione following the First team relegation to Serie B.) |
| 7 | Saronno | 24 | 9 | 5 | 10 | 40 | 38 | +2 | 23 | |
| 7 | Vis Nova | 24 | 8 | 7 | 9 | 34 | 34 | 0 | 23 | |
| 9 | Crema | 24 | 8 | 4 | 12 | 38 | 47 | −9 | 20 | |
| 9 | Biellese | 24 | 7 | 6 | 11 | 28 | 37 | −9 | 20 | |
| 9 | Clarense (E) | 24 | 7 | 6 | 11 | 31 | 53 | −22 | 20 | Renounced (Note: Renounced to play in 1933–34 Prima Divisione. A phoenix club was created in Third Division.) |
| 12 | Trevigliese | 24 | 4 | 9 | 11 | 22 | 59 | −37 | 17 | |
| 13 | Fanfulla | 24 | 6 | 4 | 14 | 34 | 55 | −21 | 16 | |
| 14 | Galliatese (E) | 0 | – | – | – | – | – | — | 0 | Retired and disbanded (Note: Retired after 18 matches. All their results were voided.) |

Source: Panini
(E) Eliminated

=== Results ===
| Home \ Away | BIE | CAÚ | CLA | CRM | FAN | GTS | MIL | PLI | PPA | SAR | SER | TOR | TVG | VNO |
|---|---|---|---|---|---|---|---|---|---|---|---|---|---|---|
| Biellese | | 1–2 | 0–0 | 1–0 | 5–0 | 3–0 | 1–1 | 2–2 | 1–2 | 1–0 | 1–1 | 1–0 | 1–0 | 0–0 |
| Cantú | 6–4 | | 2–1 | 4–1 | 3–2 | 5–1 | 2–0 | 1–0 | 2–0 | 3–1 | 0–3 | 2–2 | 4–1 | 3–1 |
| Clarense | 1–0 | 3–0 | | 0–1 | 2–0 | 1–1 | 0–3 | 2–3 | 2–0 | 1–1 | 0–2 | 1–1 | 5–1 | 2–1 |
| Crema | 1–2 | 1–6 | 6–2 | | 2–0 | | 0–0 | 5–1 | 0–3 | 2–2 | 1–2 | 0–2 | 4–0 | 0–0 |
| Fanfulla | 2–1 | 3–0 | 0–2 | 1–2 | | | 1–4 | 3–1 | 1–3 | 4–1 | 3–1 | 1–1 | 1–1 | 2–1 |
| Galliatese | 1–1 | 1–2 | | | | | | 1–0 | 0–2 | 0–0 | 1–2 | 2–0 | 3–1 | 3–2 |
| Milan | 0–1 | 2–1 | 9–0 | 4–1 | 4–1 | 3–0 | | 0–1 | 7–2 | 2–1 | 2–2 | 1–0 | 7–0 | 5–1 |
| Pro Lissone | 3–0 | 2–1 | 1–1 | 3–0 | 3–2 | | 1–2 | | 2–0 | 2–1 | 0–2 | 1–1 | 5–0 | 3–0 |
| Pro Patria | 3–1 | 1–1 | 4–2 | 3–0 | 4–2 | | 0–0 | 4–2 | | 1–3 | 0–1 | 1–2 | 0–0 | 3–2 |
| Saronno | 4–0 | 3–1 | 4–1 | 2–3 | 5–0 | 2–0 | 1–1 | 1–0 | 1–2 | | 2–0 | 0–2 | 4–1 | 1–1 |
| Seregno | 1–0 | 3–1 | 10–0 | 3–4 | 2–2 | | 1–1 | 0–0 | 3–1 | 0–2 | | 1–1 | 5–1 | 1–0 |
| Torino | 2–2 | 6–0 | 2–0 | 1–0 | 2–1 | 3–1 | 1–2 | 3–2 | 4–1 | 8–0 | 2–1 | | 4–0 | 2–0 |
| Trevigliese | 3–2 | 1–3 | 1–1 | 3–2 | 2–2 | 2–1 | 1–0 | 2–2 | 1–1 | 0–0 | 0–0 | 1–0 | | 2–2 |
| Vis Nova | 3–0 | 1–0 | 2–2 | 2–2 | 3–0 | | 1–1 | 2–1 | 2–1 | 2–0 | 1–2 | 2–1 | 4–0 | |

Updated to match(es) played on unknown. Source: Almanacco Illustrato del Calcio - La Storia 1898-2004, Panini Edizioni, Modena, September 2005 (in Italian)
Legend: Blue = home team win; Yellow = draw; Red = away team win.

== Girone C ==
=== Final classification ===
| Pos | Team | Pld | W | D | L | GF | GA | GD | Pts | Qualification or relegation |
|---|---|---|---|---|---|---|---|---|---|---|
| 1 | Vicenza | 24 | 17 | 4 | 3 | 64 | 25 | +39 | 38 | Qualified |
| 2 | Treviso | 24 | 14 | 5 | 5 | 48 | 24 | +24 | 33 | |
| 3 | Pro Gorizia | 24 | 14 | 4 | 6 | 38 | 30 | +8 | 32 | |
| 4 | Fiumana | 24 | 12 | 4 | 8 | 47 | 28 | +19 | 28 | |
| 5 | Rovigo | 24 | 10 | 7 | 7 | 44 | 32 | +12 | 27 | |
| 5 | Udinese | 24 | 10 | 7 | 7 | 41 | 33 | +8 | 27 | |
| 7 | Triestina B | 24 | 11 | 4 | 9 | 39 | 25 | +14 | 26 | |
| 8 | Padova B | 24 | 9 | 3 | 12 | 54 | 54 | 0 | 21 | |
| 9 | Trento | 24 | 7 | 6 | 11 | 33 | 57 | −24 | 20 | |
| 10 | Ponziana | 24 | 7 | 5 | 12 | 41 | 46 | −5 | 18 (Note: 1 point deducted) | |
| 11 | Thiene | 23 | 7 | 2 | 14 | 33 | 53 | −20 | 16 | |
| 11 | Schio | 23 | 5 | 4 | 14 | 30 | 61 | −31 | 16 (Note: 2 bonus points?) | |
| 13 | Pordenone | 24 | 5 | 1 | 18 | 28 | 69 | −41 | 11 | |
| 14 | Mestrina (E) | 0 | – | – | – | – | – | — | 0 | Retired and disbanded (Note: Retired after 18 matches. All their results were voided. A phoenix club was created in 1934.) |

Source: Panini
(E) Eliminated

=== Results ===
| Home \ Away | FIU | MST | PAD | PON | POR | PGO | ROV | SCH | THI | TRN | TRV | TRI | UDI | VIC |
|---|---|---|---|---|---|---|---|---|---|---|---|---|---|---|
| Fiumana | | 6–2 | 2–0 | 3–0 | 6–1 | 3–0 | 1–1 | 4–0 | 4–0 | 6–0 | 1–0 | 2–1 | 1–1 | 1–2 |
| Mestrina | 2–0 | | | 0–0 | 2–1 | 2–3 | 3–1 | 1–1 | | 2–1 | | 3–2 | | |
| Padova | 5–1 | 0–2 | | 1–4 | 4–2 | 1–2 | 1–1 | 2–1 | 4–2 | 1–2 | 1–3 | 0–1 | 1–3 | 2–4 |
| Ponziana | 1–3 | | 2–0 | | 0–2 | 2–1 | 3–1 | 0–2 | 3–1 | 5–0 | 2–2 | 1–0 | 2–2 | 2–3 |
| Pordenone | 1–2 | 3–2 | 1–5 | 2–1 | | 1–0 | 0–1 | 3–1 | 2–1 | 0–3 | 3–2 | 0–4 | 4–5 | 0–2 |
| Pro Gorizia | 2–0 | | 2–1 | .–. | 3–1 | | 3–3 | 5–0 | 3–2 | 3–2 | 2–1 | 1–0 | 1–0 | 1–1 |
| Rovigo | 3–0 | 1–0 | 4–1 | 3–2 | 2–1 | 1–0 | | 6–0 | 2–3 | 4–0 | 1–1 | 2–2 | 0–0 | 3–0 |
| Schio | 1–3 | | 0–7 | 2–0 | 4–1 | 0–0 | 1–1 | | 5–1 | 2–3 | 0–1 | .–. | 3–3 | 1–4 |
| Thiene | 1–1 | 4–1 | 0–3 | 2–2 | 5–0 | 1–3 | 2–0 | 3–3 | | 3–0 | 0–1 | 0–2 | 3–1 | 0–1 |
| Trento | 0–0 | 1–2 | 3–3 | 3–1 | 0–0 | 3–0 | 3–0 | 3–3 | 3–0 | | 1–1 | 0–2 | 1–3 | 1–1 |
| Treviso | 2–0 | 1–0 | 3–0 | 1–1 | 5–2 | 0–1 | 1–0 | 2–0 | 6–0 | 4–1 | | 2–0 | 1–1 | 4–0 |
| Triestina | 2–1 | 2–0 | 2–4 | 2–1 | 2–1 | 1–2 | 1–2 | 4–0 | 1–0 | 7–0 | 2–3 | | 1–1 | 1–1 |
| Udinese | 2–1 | 5–1 | 1–0 | 2–2 | 5–1 | 4–0 | 2–1 | 4–2 | 0–3 | 0–1 | 1–2 | 1–0 | | 1–0 |
| Vicenza | 2–1 | 0–2 | 7–1 | 4–0 | 4–1 | 1–1 | 6–2 | 4–0 | 5–0 | 6–1 | 4–1 | 0–1 | 1–0 | |

Updated to match(es) played on unknown. Source: Almanacco Illustrato del Calcio - La Storia 1898-2004, Panini Edizioni, Modena, September 2005 (in Italian)
Legend: Blue = home team win; Yellow = draw; Red = away team win.

== Girone D ==
=== Final classification ===
| Pos | Team | Pld | W | D | L | GF | GA | GD | Pts | Qualification or relegation |
|---|---|---|---|---|---|---|---|---|---|---|
| 1 | Derthona | 26 | 16 | 4 | 6 | 52 | 34 | +18 | 36 | Qualified |
| 2 | Alessandria B | 26 | 14 | 7 | 5 | 63 | 35 | +28 | 35 | |
| 2 | Savona | 26 | 16 | 3 | 7 | 65 | 37 | +28 | 35 | |
| 4 | Genova 1893 B | 26 | 14 | 6 | 6 | 59 | 33 | +26 | 34 | |
| 5 | Andrea Doria | 26 | 12 | 5 | 9 | 52 | 36 | +16 | 29 | |
| 6 | Imperia | 26 | 12 | 3 | 11 | 60 | 38 | +22 | 27 | |
| 6 | Sestrese | 26 | 11 | 5 | 10 | 37 | 45 | −8 | 27 | |
| 8 | Ventimigliese | 26 | 10 | 5 | 11 | 35 | 40 | −5 | 25 | |
| 9 | Vogherese | 26 | 9 | 5 | 12 | 36 | 51 | −15 | 23 | |
| 10 | Rapallo | 26 | 7 | 8 | 11 | 32 | 36 | −4 | 22 | |
| 11 | Vado | 26 | 9 | 2 | 15 | 30 | 47 | −17 | 20 | |
| 11 | Casale B | 26 | 5 | 10 | 11 | 39 | 58 | −19 | 20 | |
| 11 | Casteggio (R) | 26 | 8 | 4 | 14 | 42 | 75 | −33 | 20 | Relegated after tie-breaker |
| 14 | Pontedecimo (T) | 26 | 3 | 5 | 18 | 25 | 62 | −37 | 11 | (Note: Relegated and later readmitted to Prima Divisione.) |

Source: Panini
(R) Relegated; (T) Qualified, but not yet for the particular phase indicated

=== Results ===
| Home \ Away | ALE | ADO | CSL | CST | DER | GEN | IMP | PON | RAP | SVN | SES | VAD | Ven | VOG |
|---|---|---|---|---|---|---|---|---|---|---|---|---|---|---|
| Alessandria | | 5–2 | 3–3 | 2–1 | 5–1 | .–. | 3–1 | 1–0 | 2–1 | 1–1 | 4–0 | 5–1 | 0–0 | 1–1 |
| Andrea Doria | 0–1 | | 2–0 | 7–1 | 2–0 | 1–2 | 3–1 | 3–1 | 2–2 | 2–1 | 4–2 | 0–2 | 3–1 | 4–2 |
| Casale | 2–2 | 2–0 | | 5–2 | 1–1 | 1–1 | 4–0 | 1–1 | 0–0 | 1–1 | 3–0 | 2–1 | 0–0 | 2–3 |
| Casteggio | 3–1 | 2–2 | 3–3 | | 2–3 | 1–5 | 3–3 | 2–0 | 2–2 | 2–3 | 2–1 | 2–0 | 4–0 | 4–2 |
| Derthona | 1–0 | 1–1 | 3–0 | 3–1 | | 3–1 | 3–2 | 4–0 | 3–1 | 4–1 | 1–0 | 3–1 | 4–1 | 3–1 |
| Genova 1893 | 1–1 | 1–0 | 5–3 | 7–0 | 3–1 | | 1–0 | 4–0 | 2–1 | 2–0 | 1–1 | 6–0 | 0–0 | 3–3 |
| Imperia | 1–1 | 1–1 | 7–1 | 5–1 | 4–0 | 2–1 | | 5–0 | 2–0 | 2–3 | 6–0 | 3–1 | 2–0 | 2–0 |
| Pontedecimo | 3–3 | 1–3 | 4–4 | 1–2 | 1–2 | 1–3 | 1–0 | | 0–0 | 1–0 | 1–1 | 0–2 | 3–1 | 0–2 |
| Rapallo Ruentes | 1–4 | 1–0 | 1–0 | 6–0 | 1–2 | 1–0 | 0–3 | 5–2 | | 0–2 | 0–0 | 3–1 | 1–1 | 1–0 |
| Savona | 5–2 | 0–3 | 7–0 | 6–1 | .–. | 3–2 | 3–2 | 3–0 | 2–2 | | 5–0 | 1–0 | 3–1 | 1–1 |
| Sestrese | 2–3 | 3–2 | 2–0 | 2–0 | 1–1 | 3–1 | .–. | 4–4 | 0–0 | 1–2 | | 1–0 | 4–2 | 2–1 |
| Vado | 2–0 | 1–1 | 4–0 | 0–1 | 3–2 | 0–1 | 2–3 | 3–2 | 1–0 | 1–6 | 0–1 | | 3–2 | 1–0 |
| Ventimiglia | 2–0 | 2–1 | 2–1 | 4–1 | 1–0 | 1–4 | 3–1 | 2–1 | 2–0 | 3–0 | 0–1 | 3–1 | | 0–0 |
| Vogherese | 0–3 | 2–1 | 2–1 | 2–1 | 1–1 | 2–2 | 1–0 | 2–1 | 3–1 | 0–2 | 3–1 | 0–0 | 3–2 | |

Updated to match(es) played on unknown. Source: Almanacco Illustrato del Calcio - La Storia 1898-2004, Panini Edizioni, Modena, September 2005 (in Italian)
Legend: Blue = home team win; Yellow = draw; Red = away team win.

TB: Vado-Casale B 2-1; Vado-Casteggio 2-1; Casale B-Casteggio 2-0.

== Girone E ==
=== Final classification ===
| Pos | Team | Pld | W | D | L | GF | GA | GD | Pts | Qualification or relegation |
|---|---|---|---|---|---|---|---|---|---|---|
| 1 | SPAL | 24 | 15 | 4 | 5 | 77 | 32 | +45 | 34 | Qualified |
| 2 | Reggiana | 24 | 14 | 2 | 8 | 49 | 36 | +13 | 30 | |
| 2 | Parma | 24 | 13 | 4 | 7 | 41 | 33 | +8 | 30 | |
| 4 | Portuense | 24 | 11 | 6 | 7 | 48 | 41 | +7 | 28 | |
| 5 | Bologna B | 24 | 11 | 5 | 8 | 39 | 32 | +7 | 27 | |
| 6 | Carpi | 24 | 11 | 4 | 9 | 43 | 38 | +5 | 26 | |
| 7 | Forlì | 24 | 11 | 2 | 11 | 45 | 35 | +10 | 24 | |
| 8 | Piacenza | 24 | 9 | 4 | 11 | 36 | 42 | −6 | 21 (Note: 1 point deducted) | |
| 8 | Russi | 24 | 8 | 5 | 11 | 32 | 49 | −17 | 21 | |
| 10 | Mantova | 24 | 8 | 3 | 13 | 40 | 53 | −13 | 19 | |
| 10 | Ravenna | 24 | 7 | 5 | 12 | 42 | 61 | −19 | 19 | |
| 12 | F.R.A.G.D. Castelmassa (E) | 24 | 7 | 3 | 14 | 31 | 50 | −19 | 17 | Renounced and disbanded (Note: Renounced to play in 1933–34 Prima Divisione and disbanded.) |
| 13 | Molinella | 24 | 6 | 3 | 15 | 27 | 48 | −21 | 15 | |
| 14 | 83ª Leg. MVSN Fiorenzuola (R) | 0 | – | – | – | – | – | — | 0 | Retired and relegated (Note: Retired after 4 matches. All their results were voided.) |

Source: Panini
(E) Eliminated; (R) Relegated

=== Results ===
| Home \ Away | BOL | CRP | FRA | FRZ | FOR | MAN | MOL | PAR | PIA | POR | RAV | REA | RUS | SPA |
|---|---|---|---|---|---|---|---|---|---|---|---|---|---|---|
| Bologna | | 2–0 | 5–1 | 5–0 | 4–1 | 0–1 | 1–0 | 3–2 | 1–1 | 1–3 | 4–1 | 1–0 | 4–0 | 2–1 |
| Carpi | 1–1 | | 3–1 | 5–1 | 0–0 | 3–2 | 5–0 | 3–1 | 3–0 | 2–1 | 4–1 | 3–2 | 4–2 | 3–2 |
| F.R.A.G.D. | 0–0 | 2–3 | | | 3–1 | 1–0 | 3–0 | 1–2 | 2–4 | 3–1 | 3–2 | 2–3 | 2–0 | 1–2 |
| Fiorenzuola | | | | | | | | | 3–2 | 1–1 | 2–4 | 2–2 | | |
| Forlì | 3–1 | 3–0 | 2–0 | | | 7–0 | 2–0 | 4–0 | 2–1 | 1–2 | 4–2 | 1–3 | 3–2 | 0–2 |
| Mantova | 0–0 | 1–1 | 5–0 | | 1–0 | | 4–1 | 2–1 | 3–1 | 3–1 | 2–1 | 1–1 | 0–1 | 1–5 |
| Molinella | 0–1 | 2–0 | 2–1 | 3–1 | 4–1 | 3–5 | | 2–2 | 2–0 | 2–2 | 0–2 | 1–0 | 2–0 | 3–3 |
| Parma | 1–0 | 1–0 | 0–0 | | 2–1 | 2–0 | 1–0 | | 2–0 | 5–2 | 4–1 | 5–1 | 4–2 | 2–1 |
| Piacenza | 1–2 | 3–2 | 3–1 | | 0–2 | 5–3 | 2–0 | 3–1 | | 3–2 | 4–1 | 1–0 | 0–0 | 1–2 |
| Portuense | 3–4 | 0–0 | 3–1 | | 2–1 | 5–1 | 3–1 | 1–1 | 2–1 | | 2–1 | 1–2 | 1–1 | 1–1 |
| Ravenna | 2–2 | 4–1 | 3–2 | | 1–1 | 2–1 | .–. | 2–0 | 1–1 | 2–3 | | 1–3 | 6–1 | 0–5 |
| Reggiana | 4–2 | 1–0 | 1–0 | | 2–1 | 4–3 | 1–0 | 1–1 | 3–0 | 5–1 | 5–0 | | 2–0 | 4–3 |
| Russi | 1–0 | 2–1 | 3–0 | 4–2 | 2–1 | 0–2 | 4–0 | 2–0 | 1–1 | 1–4 | 2–2 | 1–0 | | 2–2 |
| SPAL | 5–3 | 2–1 | 4–1 | | 4–1 | 6–1 | 1–0 | 2–0 | 4–0 | 2–2 | 6–0 | 5–0 | 8–2 | |

Updated to match(es) played on unknown. Source: Almanacco Illustrato del Calcio - La Storia 1898-2004, Panini Edizioni, Modena, September 2005 (in Italian)
Legend: Blue = home team win; Yellow = draw; Red = away team win.

== Girone F ==
=== Final classification ===
| Pos | Team | Pld | W | D | L | GF | GA | GD | Pts | Qualification or relegation |
|---|---|---|---|---|---|---|---|---|---|---|
| 1 | Viareggio | 26 | 16 | 4 | 6 | 56 | 33 | +23 | 36 | Qualified after tie-breaker |
| 2 | Lucchese | 26 | 16 | 4 | 6 | 54 | 23 | +31 | 36 | |
| 3 | Aquila Montevarchi | 26 | 13 | 9 | 4 | 49 | 19 | +30 | 35 | |
| 3 | Prato | 26 | 15 | 5 | 6 | 56 | 24 | +32 | 35 | |
| 5 | Fiorentina B | 26 | 13 | 8 | 5 | 55 | 27 | +28 | 34 | |
| 6 | Robur | 26 | 13 | 3 | 10 | 50 | 45 | +5 | 29 | |
| 7 | Carrarese | 26 | 9 | 6 | 11 | 43 | 46 | −3 | 24 | |
| 8 | Grosseto | 26 | 6 | 10 | 10 | 33 | 43 | −10 | 22 | |
| 8 | Empoli | 26 | 9 | 4 | 13 | 31 | 44 | −13 | 22 | |
| 8 | Sempre Avanti | 26 | 10 | 2 | 14 | 47 | 61 | −14 | 22 | |
| 11 | Arezzo (E) | 26 | 9 | 3 | 14 | 37 | 52 | −15 | 21 | Renounced and disbanded (Note: Renounced to play in 1933–34 Prima Divisione and disbanded.) |
| 12 | Signe | 26 | 7 | 6 | 13 | 33 | 55 | −22 | 20 | |
| 13 | Pisa | 26 | 7 | 2 | 17 | 29 | 49 | −20 | 16 | |
| 14 | Angelo Belloni (T) | 26 | 5 | 2 | 19 | 34 | 86 | −52 | 12 | (Note: Later readmitted to Prima Divisione.) |

Source: Panini
(E) Eliminated; (T) Qualified, but not yet for the particular phase indicated

=== Results ===
| Home \ Away | AMO | ABM | ARE | CAR | EMP | FIO | GRO | LSI | LUC | PIS | PRA | SAP | ROB | VIA |
|---|---|---|---|---|---|---|---|---|---|---|---|---|---|---|
| Aquila Montevarchi | | 5–1 | 4–0 | 1–0 | 2–0 | 1–0 | 2–0 | 9–1 | 0–0 | 1–1 | 3–0 | 6–0 | 1–1 | 2–1 |
| Angelo Belloni | 0–0 | | 4–0 | 1–2 | 2–0 | 1–2 | 4–3 | 1–2 | 1–1 | 2–1 | 1–3 | 1–2 | 2–0 | 3–5 |
| Arezzo | 1–1 | 6–0 | | 3–2 | 2–2 | 0–2 | 2–0 | 3–1 | 0–2 | 1–0 | 3–0 | 1–0 | 5–1 | 2–1 |
| Carrarese | 1–2 | 3–0 | 4–0 | | 3–1 | 1–1 | 2–1 | 2–1 | 0–4 | 4–1 | 2–2 | 4–1 | 4–0 | 1–1 |
| Empoli | 0–2 | 4–3 | 1–0 | 1–0 | | 1–0 | 1–1 | 1–0 | 2–1 | 2–0 | 1–2 | 3–0 | 1–3 | 0–2 |
| Fiorentina | 0–0 | .–. | 6–2 | 3–0 | 0–2 | | 1–1 | 1–1 | 3–2 | 3–2 | 1–0 | 7–0 | 4–0 | 2–2 |
| Grosseto | 1–1 | 4–0 | 1–1 | 1–1 | 2–2 | 1–1 | | 4–0 | 1–1 | 2–0 | 1–0 | 1–0 | 1–0 | 1–1 |
| Le Signe | 1–1 | 0–7 | 2–1 | 1–1 | 2–1 | 1–1 | 2–2 | | 2–1 | 2–0 | 0–3 | 3–1 | 0–3 | 0–1 |
| Lucchese | 2–1 | 7–0 | 3–0 | 4–2 | 5–0 | 2–1 | 4–1 | 3–0 | | 3–0 | 2–1 | 2–1 | 1–0 | 0–2 |
| Pisa | 1–2 | 1–0 | 2–0 | 2–0 | 0–1 | 1–1 | 4–2 | 4–0 | 2–0 | | 0–2 | 1–0 | 0–4 | 1–2 |
| Prato | 2–0 | 6–1 | 5–1 | 3–1 | 0–0 | 1–0 | 4–0 | 1–1 | 1–1 | 3–0 | | 5–0 | 3–0 | 3–0 |
| Sempre Avanti | 2–2 | 4–3 | 2–1 | 4–1 | 4–3 | 2–3 | 4–0 | 3–1 | 1–2 | 4–3 | 2–1 | | 4–1 | 1–1 |
| Robur | 2–1 | 6–0 | 4–1 | 2–2 | 4–2 | 1–2 | 3–1 | 5–1 | 2–0 | 2–1 | 1–1 | 3–2 | | 3–0 |
| Viareggio | 1–0 | 3–2 | 2–1 | 5–0 | 4–2 | 3–0 | 2–0 | 2–1 | 0–1 | 5–2 | 2–5 | 3–2 | 5–0 | |

Updated to match(es) played on unknown. Source: Almanacco Illustrato del Calcio - La Storia 1898-2004, Panini Edizioni, Modena, September 2005 (in Italian)
Legend: Blue = home team win; Yellow = draw; Red = away team win.

TB: Viareggio-Lucchese 2-1.

== Girone G ==
=== Final classification ===
| Pos | Team | Pld | W | D | L | GF | GA | GD | Pts | Qualification or relegation |
|---|---|---|---|---|---|---|---|---|---|---|
| 1 | Perugia | 26 | 16 | 8 | 2 | 49 | 19 | +30 | 40 | Qualified |
| 2 | Foligno | 26 | 17 | 3 | 6 | 47 | 27 | +20 | 37 | |
| 3 | Roma B | 26 | 14 | 7 | 5 | 52 | 32 | +20 | 35 | |
| 4 | Fano Alma Juventus | 26 | 10 | 10 | 6 | 38 | 37 | +1 | 30 | |
| 5 | L'Aquila | 26 | 11 | 6 | 9 | 35 | 24 | +11 | 28 | |
| 6 | Ascoli (D, R) | 26 | 11 | 5 | 10 | 44 | 39 | +5 | 27 | Relegated by the FIGC (Note: Renounced to play in 1933–34 Prima Divisione.) |
| 7 | Ternana | 26 | 10 | 6 | 10 | 42 | 32 | +10 | 26 | |
| 7 | Anconitana-Bianchi | 26 | 11 | 4 | 11 | 38 | 42 | −4 | 26 | |
| 9 | Lazio B | 26 | 9 | 4 | 13 | 54 | 51 | +3 | 22 | |
| 9 | Pescara | 26 | 8 | 6 | 12 | 42 | 53 | −11 | 22 | |
| 9 | Sambenedettese | 26 | 7 | 8 | 11 | 29 | 40 | −11 | 22 | |
| 12 | Pontedera | 26 | 6 | 5 | 15 | 34 | 48 | −14 | 17 | |
| 13 | Torres | 26 | 6 | 4 | 16 | 28 | 57 | −29 | 16 | |
| 14 | Civitavecchiese (T) | 26 | 6 | 4 | 16 | 23 | 54 | −31 | 16 | (Note: Later readmitted to Prima Divisione.) |

Source: Panini
(D) Disqualified; (R) Relegated; (T) Qualified, but not yet for the particular phase indicated

=== Results ===
| Home \ Away | ALM | ABI | ASC | CIV | FOL | LAQ | LAZ | PER | PES | PDE | ROM | SBN | TER | SST |
|---|---|---|---|---|---|---|---|---|---|---|---|---|---|---|
| Alma Juventus | | 0–0 | 2–3 | 4–0 | 2–1 | 1–0 | 2–3 | 0–1 | 2–0 | 2–1 | 1–3 | 2–2 | 2–1 | 4–2 |
| Anconitana Bianchi | 1–0 | | 1–2 | 2–0 | 1–2 | 2–1 | 2–1 | 2–0 | 3–2 | 2–1 | 2–2 | 3–0 | 2–1 | 0–2 |
| Ascoli | 5–0 | 5–2 | | 2–1 | 4–1 | 0–1 | 3–1 | 0–3 | 2–1 | 3–0 | 6–1 | 2–1 | 1–2 | 2–0 |
| Civitavecchiese | 1–2 | 1–0 | 0–0 | | 0–5 | 1–0 | 2–1 | 0–0 | 3–1 | 2–4 | 1–2 | 1–1 | 2–0 | 3–1 |
| Foligno | 0–0 | 1–1 | 3–0 | 1–0 | | 3–0 | 3–2 | 2–1 | 0–2 | 2–1 | 1–0 | 2–0 | 2–1 | 4–0 |
| L'Aquila | 1–1 | 1–1 | 5–2 | 4–0 | 3–0 | | 1–0 | 0–0 | 1–0 | 3–0 | 2–2 | 1–0 | 4–2 | 2–1 |
| Lazio | 2–3 | 1–2 | 1–0 | 3–1 | 1–0 | 0–4 | | 3–3 | 11–2 | 2–0 | 3–1 | 3–2 | 0–3 | 8–1 |
| Perugia | 1–1 | 3–1 | 1–0 | 4–0 | 0–0 | 2–0 | 7–3 | | 3–1 | 3–0 | 1–0 | 3–2 | 3–1 | 1–0 |
| Pescara | 4–0 | 1–0 | 0–0 | 1–1 | 2–3 | 1–0 | 2–1 | 2–1 | | 4–3 | 0–0 | 1–1 | 1–1 | 5–0 |
| Pontedera | 2–2 | 5–2 | 3–0 | 4–1 | 0–2 | 0–0 | 1–1 | 1–2 | 1–2 | | 1–1 | 2–1 | 2–1 | 0–0 |
| Roma | 0–0 | 5–3 | 4–0 | 3–0 | 3–0 | 1–0 | 2–0 | 1–2 | 4–3 | 2–1 | | 5–1 | 2–1 | 5–1 |
| Sambenedettese | 1–1 | .–. | 2–2 | 2–1 | 1–0 | 1–0 | 2–1 | 0–0 | 2–1 | 3–0 | 0–0 | | 2–1 | 1–2 |
| Ternana | 1–1 | 2–0 | 3–0 | 4–0 | 1–2 | 0–0 | 2–2 | 1–1 | 2–0 | 3–1 | 1–1 | 4–0 | | 2–3 |
| Torres | 2–3 | 2–1 | 0–0 | 3–2 | 1–2 | 3–1 | 0–0 | 1–3 | 2–4 | 2–0 | 1–2 | 1–1 | 0–1 | |

Updated to match(es) played on unknown. Source: Almanacco Illustrato del Calcio - La Storia 1898-2004, Panini Edizioni, Modena, September 2005 (in Italian)
Legend: Blue = home team win; Yellow = draw; Red = away team win.

== Girone H ==
=== Final classification ===
| Pos | Team | Pld | W | D | L | GF | GA | GD | Pts | Qualification or relegation |
|---|---|---|---|---|---|---|---|---|---|---|
| 1 | Foggia | 20 | 15 | 2 | 3 | 65 | 20 | +45 | 32 | Qualified |
| 2 | Taranto | 20 | 12 | 5 | 3 | 51 | 22 | +29 | 29 | |
| 3 | Savoia | 20 | 13 | 1 | 6 | 50 | 27 | +23 | 27 | |
| 4 | Salernitana | 20 | 11 | 3 | 6 | 48 | 25 | +23 | 25 | |
| 5 | Napoli B | 20 | 10 | 4 | 6 | 37 | 31 | +6 | 24 | |
| 6 | Bagnolese | 20 | 8 | 3 | 9 | 34 | 35 | −1 | 19 | |
| 6 | Molfetta | 20 | 9 | 1 | 10 | 34 | 36 | −2 | 19 | |
| 8 | Bari B | 20 | 6 | 4 | 10 | 25 | 30 | −5 | 16 | Excluded (Note: Excluded from 1933–34 Prima Divisione following the First team relegation to Serie B.) |
| 9 | Gladiator (E) | 20 | 6 | 1 | 13 | 24 | 85 | −61 | 13 | Disbanded |
| 10 | Stabiese (E) | 20 | 4 | 2 | 14 | 21 | 43 | −22 | 10 | Disbanded |
| 11 | Franco Tosi Taranto | 20 | 2 | 2 | 16 | 20 | 55 | −35 | 6 | |
| 12 | Cotoniere Angri (E) | 0 | – | – | – | – | – | — | 0 | Retired and disbanded |

Source: Panini
(E) Eliminated

=== Results ===
| Home \ Away | BAG | BAR | CTO | FOG | GLA | MOL | NAP | SAL | SAV | STA | TAR |
|---|---|---|---|---|---|---|---|---|---|---|---|
| Bagnolese | | 3–0 | 3–0 | 2–4 | 2–1 | 4–0 | 1–1 | 3–1 | 1–2 | 2–0 | 1–4 |
| Bari | 2–4 | | 3–1 | 0–2 | 4–0 | 1–1 | 2–0 | 2–0 | 0–0 | 4–0 | 0–2 |
| Cantieri Tosi | 1–2 | 0–2 | | 1–3 | 8–0 | 0–2 | 1–2 | 0–1 | 3–2 | 2–6 | 1–1 |
| Foggia | 4–2 | 4–1 | 6–0 | | 7–1 | 1–0 | 6–0 | 1–1 | 2–0 | 4–0 | 0–2 |
| Gladiator | 0–2 | 1–0 | 3–1 | 0–9 | | 3–2 | 5–1 | 0–9 | 2–1 | 2–1 | 0–0 |
| Molfetta | 3–0 | 3–0 | 3–0 | 0–2 | 4–2 | | 1–2 | 2–1 | 1–2 | 1–0 | 1–0 |
| Napoli | 3–1 | 1–1 | 0–0 | 1–0 | 11–0 | 5–1 | | 1–0 | 1–0 | 1–0 | 1–1 |
| Salernitana | 1–0 | 2–1 | 5–0 | 2–2 | 4–0 | 4–2 | 6–3 | | 3–1 | 3–0 | 1–3 |
| Savoia | 4–1 | 1–0 | 4–0 | 4–2 | 8–2 | 3–2 | 3–1 | 2–1 | | 5–0 | 4–0 |
| Stabiese | 1–0 | 1–1 | 5–1 | 1–2 | 2–1 | 2–2 | 0–1 | 1–2 | 0–3 | | 1–2 |
| Taranto | 4–0 | 4–1 | 2–0 | 2–4 | 9–1 | 3–3 | 2–1 | 1–1 | 5–1 | 4–0 | |

Updated to match(es) played on unknown. Source: Almanacco Illustrato del Calcio - La Storia 1898-2004, Panini Edizioni, Modena, September 2005 (in Italian)
Legend: Blue = home team win; Yellow = draw; Red = away team win.

== Girone I ==
=== Final classification ===
| Pos | Team | Pld | W | D | L | GF | GA | GD | Pts | Qualification or relegation |
|---|---|---|---|---|---|---|---|---|---|---|
| 1 | Catanzarese | 20 | 13 | 5 | 2 | 49 | 18 | +31 | 31 | Qualified (Note: Qualified after tie-breaker: Catanzarese-Siracusa 1-0.) |
| 2 | Siracusa | 20 | 12 | 7 | 1 | 43 | 14 | +29 | 31 | |
| 3 | Cosenza | 20 | 11 | 2 | 7 | 29 | 26 | +3 | 24 | |
| 4 | Catania | 20 | 9 | 4 | 7 | 39 | 22 | +17 | 22 | |
| 5 | Reggina | 20 | 10 | 2 | 8 | 38 | 29 | +9 | 22 | |
| 6 | Juventus Trapani | 20 | 10 | 2 | 8 | 35 | 35 | 0 | 22 | |
| 7 | Acireale (E) | 20 | 8 | 3 | 9 | 27 | 21 | +6 | 19 | Disbanded |
| 8 | Palermo B | 20 | 5 | 5 | 10 | 25 | 32 | −7 | 15 | |
| 8 | Nissena | 20 | 7 | 1 | 12 | 29 | 43 | −14 | 15 | |
| 10 | Agrigento (E) | 20 | 4 | 4 | 12 | 28 | 47 | −19 | 12 | Disbanded |
| 11 | Peloro Messina (T) | 20 | 3 | 1 | 16 | 20 | 65 | −45 | 6 (Note: 1 point deducted) | (Note: Later readmitted to Prima Divisione.) |

Source: Panini
(E) Eliminated; (T) Qualified, but not yet for the particular phase indicated

=== Results ===
| Home \ Away | ACR | AGR | CTZ | CTN | COS | JTR | NIS | PAL | PEL | REG | SIR |
|---|---|---|---|---|---|---|---|---|---|---|---|
| Acireale | | 1–0 | 0–2 | 0–0 | 2–0 | 2–1 | 2–1 | 3–3 | 1–0 | 3–0 | 0–3 |
| Agrigento | 2–2 | | 3–3 | 2–3 | 2–0 | 2–2 | 1–2 | 1–0 | 1–2 | 3–1 | 2–4 |
| Catanzarese | 2–1 | 6–5 | | 3–2 | 4–0 | 2–0 | 4–0 | 4–0 | 5–1 | 0–1 | 1–1 |
| Catania | 3–2 | 3–1 | 0–0 | | 0–1 | 6–0 | 1–0 | 2–1 | 8–0 | 4–0 | 0–0 |
| Cosenza | 4–1 | 2–1 | 2–3 | 2–0 | | 2–1 | 2–1 | 0–0 | 1–0 | 1–3 | 3–0 |
| Juventus Trapani | 3–1 | 5–2 | 1–0 | 3–1 | 2–1 | | 0–1 | 1–0 | 4–3 | 3–1 | 1–1 |
| Nissena | 0–3 | 2–0 | 2–3 | 2–0 | 1–2 | 2–1 | | 3–2 | 3–2 | 2–1 | 0–0 |
| Palermo | 0–1 | 1–1 | 1–1 | 2–1 | 1–2 | 1–0 | 1–0 | | 8–0 | 1–1 | 1–2 |
| Peloro | 1–0 | 1–3 | 1–3 | 1–4 | 0–0 | 2–3 | 6–4 | 0–2 | | 0–3 | 0–5 |
| Reggina | 5–2 | 5–0 | 1–2 | 1–0 | 1–4 | 3–0 | 4–2 | 3–0 | 3–0 | | 0–0 |
| Siracusa | 1–0 | 2–1 | 1–1 | 1–1 | 3–0 | 2–1 | 5–1 | 6–0 | 4–0 | 2–1 | |

Updated to match(es) played on unknown. Source: Almanacco Illustrato del Calcio - La Storia 1898-2004, Panini Edizioni, Modena, September 2005 (in Italian)
Legend: Blue = home team win; Yellow = draw; Red = away team win.

== Final rounds ==
Following a fascist decision to improve their popularity, these finals were annulled and all the clubs were promoted to expand the Serie B.

=== Girone A ===
| Pos | Team | Pld | W | D | L | Pts | |
|---|---|---|---|---|---|---|---|
| 1 | Perugia (P) | 2 | 1 | 1 | 0 | 4 | Promotion to Serie B |
| 2 | Catanzarese (P) | 2 | 0 | 1 | 1 | 1 (Note: Initially not promoted, later admitted to Serie B.) | Promotion to Serie B |
| 3 | Seregno (P) | 0 | 0 | 0 | 0 | 0 (Note: Renounced to play in the final round, later admitted to Serie B.) | Promotion to Serie B |

Source: Panini
(P) Promoted

=== Girone B ===
| Pos | Team | Pld | W | D | L | Pts | |
|---|---|---|---|---|---|---|---|
| 1 | Foggia (P) | 4 | ? | ? | ? | 5 | Promotion to Serie B |
| 2 | SPAL (P) | 4 | ? | ? | ? | 4 (Note: Initially not promoted, later admitted to Serie B.) | Promotion to Serie B |
| 3 | Pavia (P) | 4 | ? | ? | ? | 3 (Note: Initially not promoted, later admitted to Serie B.) | Promotion to Serie B |

Source: Panini
(P) Promoted

=== Girone C ===
| Pos | Team | Pld | W | D | L | Pts | |
|---|---|---|---|---|---|---|---|
| 1 | Viareggio (P) | 4 | ? | ? | ? | 5 | Promotion to Serie B |
| 2 | Vicenza (P) | 4 | ? | ? | ? | 4 (Note: Initially not promoted, later admitted to Serie B.) | Promotion to Serie B |
| 3 | Derthona (P) | 4 | ? | ? | ? | 3 (Note: Initially not promoted, later admitted to Serie B.) | Promotion to Serie B |

Source: Panini
(P) Promoted
