= 1935–36 Serie C =

Serie C
- Season: 1935–36
- Promoted: Spezia; Cremonese; Venezia; Catanzarese
- Relegated: Como; Casale; Empoli; Montevarchi and many disbanded clubs

The 1935–36 Serie C was the first edition of Serie C, the third highest league in the Italian football league system.

The fascists changed the championships names as a trick to restore the format of 1929. The National Division Serie C took the place of the old First Division and its four groups format.

== Group A (North-East) ==
=== Final classification ===
Pos	Team	Pld	W	D	L	GF	GA	GD	Pts	Promotion or relegation
1	Venezia (P)	30	19	4	7	66	28	+38	42	Promoted
2	Vicenza	30	17	6	7	82	44	+38	40	
3	Udinese	30	14	11	5	58	29	+29	39	
4	Padova	30	15	8	7	58	48	+10	38	
5	Treviso	30	14	8	8	46	38	+8	36	
6	Anconitana–Bianchi	30	13	7	10	53	35	+18	33	
7	Rovigo	30	13	6	11	41	35	+6	32	
7	Mantova	30	11	10	9	45	42	+3	32	
9	Jesi	30	12	7	11	38	33	+5	31	
10	Fiumana	30	12	6	12	59	48	+11	30	
10	Pro Gorizia	30	12	6	12	51	55	−4	30	
12	Fano	30	12	3	15	55	59	−4	27	
13	Grion Pola (T)	30	10	5	15	31	54	−23	25	Later readmitted (Note: Championship enlargement)
14	Libertas Rimini (T)	30	6	7	17	29	63	−34	19	Later readmitted
15	Forlimpopoli (T)	30	5	5	20	38	82	−44	15	Later readmitted
16	Trento (R, E)	30	3	5	22	28	85	−57	11	Phoenix club in D

Source: Panini
(E) Eliminated; (P) Promoted; (R) Relegated; (T) Qualified, but not yet for the particular phase indicated

=== Results ===
Home \ Away	ALM	ABI	FIU	FRL	GRP	JES	LIB	MAN	PAD	PGO	ROV	TRN	TRV	UDI	VEN	VIC
Alma Juventus		1–2	7–4	3–2	2–0	4–1	7–1	1–0	1–1	2–1	1–3	3–0	1–2	0–0	2–3	1–0
Anconitana Bianchi	0–1		2–3	6–0	2–0	4–0	3–0	2–2	2–1	2–0	1–1	7–0	3–0	0–3	2–1	0–0
Fiumana	2–0	2–1		3–0	3–0	0–1	4–0	3–0	2–2	4–0	2–0	6–1	0–0	1–1	2–1	1–1
Forlimpopoli	1–4	2–3	0–6		2–0	0–1	5–0	3–2	1–1	1–1	1–1	1–1	1–4	3–1	0–1	1–4
Grion Pola	2–1	2–1	1–0	1–1		3–0	2–1	1–0	1–2	0–0	3–1	0–0	2–1	0–0	1–3	2–1
Jesi	2–0	0–1	5–0	2–0	3–0		0–0	1–1	2–1	4–2	0–0	3–1	0–0	1–2	3–1	2–0
Libertas Rimini	1–2	0–0	0–0	5–2	1–1	2–1		0–0	2–2	2–3	0–2	2–1	0–2	2–0	0–2	1–5
Mantova	3–2	2–2	2–1	2–0	4–1	2–1	0–1		5–1	1–0	1–0	2–1	1–1	2–4	2–2	2–1
Padova	7–1	0–0	2–1	5–3	2–1	2–0	3–1	2–0		7–1	1–1	3–0	3–1	1–0	2–0	0–1
Pro Gorizia	6–1	1–1	2–1	4–1	1–0	1–0	1–0	1–1	0–1		1–0	4–0	3–1	2–4	2–1	2–2
Rovigo	1–1	3–1	3–2	4–1	3–2	1–0	0–1	3–0	6–1	4–1		1–0	0–1	0–0	0–1	1–0
Trento	3–1	0–3	3–3	1–3	1–2	1–2	3–3	0–2	1–1	0–6	0–1		1–4	1–0	1–2	3–6
Treviso	3–1	1–0	2–1	5–1	4–0	1–1	2–0	1–1	1–3	1–0	2–1	0–2		0–0	3–2	0–2
Udinese	3–2	2–1	5–0	3–1	4–1	1–0	4–2	2–2	0–0	2–2	7–0	6–0	0–0		1–1	2–0
Venezia	2–0	4–0	3–0	4–0	4–0	1–1	4–0	1–0	4–1	3–0	1–0	3–0	1–1	4–1		4–0
Vicenza	3–2	3–1	3–2	4–1	6–2	1–1	2–1	3–3	9–0	8–3	2–0	5–2	7–2	0–0	3–2	

Updated to match(es) played on unknown. Source: Almanacco Illustrato del Calcio - La Storia 1898-2004, Panini Edizioni, Modena, September 2005 (in Italian)
Legend: Blue = home team win; Yellow = draw; Red = away team win.

== Group B (Lombardy) ==
=== Final classification ===
Pos	Team	Pld	W	D	L	GF	GA	GD	Pts	Promotion or relegation
1	Cremonese (P)	30	21	5	4	72	25	+47	47	Promoted
2	Reggiana	30	21	3	6	60	28	+32	45	
3	Biellese	30	20	4	6	57	30	+27	44	
4	Seregno	30	18	2	10	40	26	+14	38	
5	Acciaierie Falck	30	12	8	10	44	33	+11	32	
5	Monza	30	13	6	11	45	37	+8	32	
7	Piacenza	30	13	5	12	62	42	+20	31	
7	Lecco	30	11	9	10	56	44	+12	31	
9	Parma	30	12	6	12	39	39	0	30	
10	Crema	30	10	7	13	39	51	−12	27	
11	Pro Patria	30	9	8	13	44	53	−9	26	
12	Fanfulla	30	7	9	14	50	67	−17	23 (Note: Tie-breaker: Fanfulla-Legnano 3-1.)	
13	Legnano (T)	30	8	7	15	31	46	−15	23	Later readmitted
14	Gallaratese (T)	30	5	12	13	24	46	−22	22	Later readmitted
15	Cusiana Omegna (T)	30	9	3	18	34	65	−31	21	Later readmitted
16	Comense (R)	30	2	4	24	30	95	−65	8	Relegated

Source: Panini
(P) Promoted; (R) Relegated; (T) Qualified, but not yet for the particular phase indicated

=== Results ===
Home \ Away	AFA	BIE	CRM	CRE	COM	CUS	FAN	GLR	LCO	LEG	MON	PAR	PIA	PPA	REA	SER
Acciaierie Falck		2–3	0–2	0–5	3–1	5–1	2–1	2–0	1–1	3–0	0–1	1–0	1–1	5–1	0–0	1–0
Biellese	2–1		3–0	2–1	4–2	6–0	2–0	1–1	2–1	1–0	2–0	2–0	4–2	4–0	4–1	3–1
Crema	1–3	1–0		1–1	4–0	1–0	3–2	1–1	1–1	2–1	1–3	2–1	5–0	2–0	0–2	3–0
Cremonese	2–1	1–2	3–1		5–0	6–0	4–1	4–0	4–2	2–1	2–0	5–0	1–1	1–1	4–0	0–3
Comense	1–6	0–1	2–2	0–1		3–1	3–3	1–0	1–2	0–2	1–1	0–1	2–4	1–4	0–3	2–5
Cusiana	3–0	4–1	0–0	1–2	2–0		3–1	1–0	4–2	0–0	1–0	2–1	2–0	1–2	0–1	0–1
Fanfulla	0–0	4–2	3–1	2–2	1–1	4–1		4–0	2–1	5–3	3–4	2–3	0–0	1–4	0–2	3–2
Gallaratese	2–2	1–1	0–0	1–2	4–1	1–0	0–0		1–1	1–1	1–1	0–0	2–1	3–2	0–2	1–0
Lecco	0–0	1–1	2–1	1–2	6–2	5–1	3–0	3–0		1–1	4–2	1–1	1–2	4–1	3–1	1–0
Legnano	0–2	0–0	1–1	0–1	3–2	2–1	2–1	0–0	2–0		0–1	1–2	3–2	1–1	1–2	0–1
Monza	0–0	3–0	1–0	0–3	6–1	5–0	5–0	2–2	2–1	0–2		2–1	1–0	3–2	0–0	0–2
Parma	0–0	0–1	3–1	2–1	6–1	2–0	2–2	2–1	0–3	2–3	2–2		2–1	2–0	0–1	2–0
Piacenza	2–0	0–1	6–0	0–0	4–1	4–2	1–1	3–0	5–2	0–0	0–0	0–0		5–0	0–1	1–2
Pro Patria	1–0	0–1	3–1	1–2	6–1	1–1	1–1	2–1	1–1	2–1	3–0	0–0	2–3		1–1	0–1
Reggiana	1–3	2–1	3–0	1–2	3–0	6–2	8–3	4–0	2–1	2–0	1–0	2–0	3–1	4–1		1–0
Seregno	1–0	1–0	4–1	0–3	2–0	3–0	2–0	2–0	1–1	1–0	1–0	1–0	1–2	1–1	1–0	

Updated to match(es) played on unknown. Source: Almanacco Illustrato del Calcio - La Storia 1898-2004, Panini Edizioni, Modena, September 2005 (in Italian)
Legend: Blue = home team win; Yellow = draw; Red = away team win.

== Group C (North-West) ==
=== Final classification ===
Pos	Team	Pld	W	D	L	GF	GA	GD	Pts	Promotion or relegation
1	Spezia (P)	28	20	6	2	63	13	+50	46	Promoted (Note: Promoted after Sanremese refused to play the repetition of the tie-breaker (Sanremese-Spezia 1-0), voided for technical error.)
2	Sanremese	28	20	6	2	61	17	+44	46	
3	Sestrese	28	12	10	6	45	29	+16	34	
4	Andrea Doria	28	11	11	6	42	35	+7	33	
5	Entella	28	10	12	6	33	24	+9	32	
6	Imperia	28	12	6	10	61	47	+14	30	
7	Pontedecimo	28	9	9	10	38	38	0	27	
7	Asti	28	10	7	11	43	50	−7	27	
7	Derthona	28	10	7	11	40	52	−12	27	
10	Savona	28	9	7	12	45	66	−21	25	
11	Rivarolese	28	7	10	11	38	51	−13	24	
12	Pontedera	28	9	5	14	54	46	+8	23	
13	Montevarchi (R)	28	6	5	17	29	47	−18	17	Relegated
14	Ventimigliese (R, E)	28	5	7	16	19	48	−29	17	Relegated and disbanded
15	Casale (R)	28	3	6	19	17	63	−46	12	Relegated
16	Empoli (D, R)	0	–	–	–	–	–	—	7	Retired and relegated (Note: Retired after nine matches.)

Source: Panini
(D) Disqualified; (E) Eliminated; (P) Promoted; (R) Relegated

=== Results ===
Home \ Away	ADO	AMO	AST	CSL	DER	EMP	VET	IMP	PON	PDE	RIV	SNR	SVN	SES	SPE	Ven
Andrea Doria		2–1	1–0	3–0	3–0		2–2	4–2	2–2	3–1	0–0	1–3	4–1	1–1	0–0	1–1
Aquila Montevarchi	0–0		2–0	0–1	0–2		3–2	1–2	0–1	0–1	0–2	2–2	2–1	0–0	0–2	4–1
Asti	2–4	2–1		4–1	1–1	3–3	1–0	1–1	1–0	4–1	2–1	0–1	3–2	2–2	0–0	2–0
Casale	1–0	1–2	0–3		0–0		0–1	1–3	5–3	0–0	0–2	0–2	1–1	2–2	0–3	2–0
Derthona	4–1	1–0	1–1	2–1			2–2	4–0	2–0	2–1	3–0	2–3	2–2	2–3	0–0	3–2
Empoli	4–0				2–1			1–1	0–0	0–2						
Virtus Entella	1–1	2–0	5–1	1–0	3–0			2–0	4–0	1–0	1–1	0–0	1–0	2–0	0–0	0–0
Imperia	1–1	5–0	5–2	7–1	1–2		0–0		3–0	2–0	10–0	1–2	2–1	1–1	0–2	2–1
Pontedecimo	0–1	3–3	1–1	3–0	5–0		0–0	2–1		1–1	0–2	0–2	5–0	1–1	0–4	3–1
Pontedera	0–1	1–4	6–2	6–0	4–1		3–0	8–1	1–1		4–2	0–4	4–1	1–0	2–5	7–0
Rivarolese	1–2	1–1	2–2	1–0	4–0		1–1	2–2	0–1	0–0		2–2	9–2	2–2	1–1	0–1
Sanremese	5–1	1–0	3–2	0–0	4–0	1–0	1–0	3–0	3–1	0–0	6–0		5–1	0–0	1–0	1–0
Savona	1–1	5–3	2–1	2–0	5–2	3–0	1–1	2–2	0–2	3–1	2–1	2–0		2–1	0–0	3–0
Sestrese	0–1	2–0	5–1	1–1	4–1		3–0	1–4	1–1	3–1	0–1	0–2	3–1		5–0	1–0
Spezia	3–1	3–0	2–0	7–1	2–1	2–1	3–0	2–0	1–0	2–0	5–0	1–0	9–0	1–0		3–0
Ventimiglia	1–1	1–0	0–2	2–0	0–0		0–0	1–3	0–0	2–1	1–0	1–4	2–2	0–1	1–2	

Updated to match(es) played on unknown. Source: Almanacco Illustrato del Calcio - La Storia 1898-2004, Panini Edizioni, Modena, September 2005 (in Italian)
Legend: Blue = home team win; Yellow = draw; Red = away team win.

== Group D (South) ==
=== Final classification ===
Pos	Team	Pld	W	D	L	GF	GA	GD	Pts	Promotion or relegation
1	Catanzarese (P)	26	16	5	5	63	27	+36	37	Promoted
2	Sempre Avanti	26	15	3	8	52	26	+26	33	
3	Nissena (E)	26	14	5	7	42	24	+18	33	Disbanded
4	Civitavecchia	26	13	6	7	47	29	+18	32	
4	Benevento	26	12	8	6	29	30	−1	32	
6	Salernitana	26	11	7	8	36	26	+10	29	
7	Lucano Potenza	26	9	7	10	29	34	−5	25	
8	Bagnolese	26	8	8	10	39	50	−11	24	
9	Savoia (E, R)	26	8	7	11	25	37	−12	23	Phoenix club in D
10	Cosenza	26	7	8	11	27	38	−11	22	
11	Signe	26	6	9	11	40	41	−1	21	
11	Cerignola	26	7	7	12	29	36	−7	21	
13	Prato (T)	26	6	5	15	17	43	−26	16 (Note: 1 point deducted)	
14	Fermana (R, E)	26	6	3	17	21	55	−34	14	Disbanded
15	AS Pescara (E)	0	–	–	–	–	–	—	0	Withdrew and disbanded
16	Old Cagliari (E)	0	–	–	–	–	–	—	0	Withdrew and disbanded

Source: Panini
(E) Eliminated; (P) Promoted; (R) Relegated; (T) Qualified, but not yet for the particular phase indicated

=== Results ===
Home \ Away	BAG	BEN	CTZ	CER	CIV	COS	FER	LUC	NIS	PRA	SAL	SAV	SAP	SIG
Bagnolese		1–1	3–3	1–0	3–3	2–0	3–0	3–2	1–1	3–0	1–1	2–1	3–3	2–1
Benevento	2–0		1–1	2–1	2–1	1–0	3–0	1–0	1–1	1–0	1–0	1–0	3–2	2–0
Catanzarese	3–0	4–0		2–0	2–0	8–0	6–1	2–1	1–0	1–0	3–0	3–0	5–3	3–1
Cerignola	2–0	2–1	0–0		1–2	3–0	3–0	1–1	1–0	2–0	1–1	3–0	1–1	0–0
Civitavecchiese	2–1	5–1	4–1	1–0		0–0	2–0	5–0	2–2	1–1	2–2	4–0	1–0	2–0
Cosenza	0–3	1–1	2–3	1–1	4–1		0–1	3–1	1–1	3–0	0–0	1–1	1–0	4–2
Fermana	5–1	1–1	0–2	3–1	0–5	0–0		1–0	0–2	2–0	0–1	2–2	0–5	2–1
Lucano Potenza	2–2	0–0	1–0	3–2	0–1	1–0	2–1		1–0	3–1	1–0	3–0	1–2	1–1
Nissena	4–1	3–1	2–1	4–1	4–0	1–0	1–0	2–0		3–0	2–1	2–1	3–1	3–0
Prato	0–0	0–1	0–7	2–1	1–0	0–2	2–1	0–2	1–1		3–0	0–0	0–2	3–2
Salernitana	2–1	3–0	0–0	1–1	1–0	4–1	4–0	0–0	3–0	2–0		2–1	2–1	5–0
Savoia	3–2	0–0	2–1	2–1	2–0	1–0	2–0	1–1	2–0	0–1	2–0		1–0	1–1
Sempre Avanti	2–0	4–1	5–0	5–0	0–0	0–1	1–0	4–1	2–0	1–0	2–1	3–0		2–1
Signe	7–0	0–0	1–1	3–0	3–1	2–2	5–1	1–1	1–0	2–2	3–0	2–2	0–1	

Updated to match(es) played on unknown. Source: Almanacco Illustrato del Calcio - La Storia 1898-2004, Panini Edizioni, Modena, September 2005 (in Italian)
Legend: Blue = home team win; Yellow = draw; Red = away team win.
