= 1933–34 Prima Divisione =

Prima Divisione
- Season: 1933–34
- Promoted: Pisa; Lucchese; Aquila; Catania
- Relegated: solely disbanded clubs

The 1933–34 Prima Divisione was the third level league of the 34th Italian football championship.

In 1928, FIGC had decided a reform of the league structure of Italian football. The top-level league was the National Division, composed by the two divisions of Serie A and Serie B. Under them, there were the local championship, the major one being the First Division, that in 1935 will take the name of Serie C. Starting from this season, the winners and the runners-up of the eight groups of First Division would be admitted to the final rounds, where four tickets of promotion to Serie B were available, whereas the scheduled relegations were annulled by the Federation which expanded the division. Until this season, reserve teams of club belonging to Serie A were admitted in First Division.

== Legend ==
Qualified (for regular season's groups)
Promoted
Relegated

== Girone A ==
Pos	Team	Pld	Pts
1	Udinese	28	41
2	Pro Gorizia	28	41
3	Treviso	28	37
4	Fiumana	28	36
5	Rovigo	28	33
6	CRDA Monfalcone	28	32
7	Triestina B (Note: "B" teams excluded from 1934–35 Prima Divisione for championship reform.)	28	32
8	Ponziana	28	27
9	Trento	28	27
10	Padova B	28	26
11	Schio	28	23
12	Pordenone	28	21
13	Bolzano	28	18
14	Bassano	28	14
15	Thiene (R)	28	12

Source: Panini
(R) Relegated

== Girone B ==
Pos	Team	Pld	Pts
1	Monza	28	42
2	Milan B (Note: "B" teams excluded from 1934–35 Prima Divisione for championship reform.)	28	41
3	Falck Sesto S.G.	28	32
4	Pro Lissone	28	32
5	Lecco	28	29
6	Crema	28	28
7	Soresinese	28	24
8	Cantù (Note: Renounced to play in 1934–35 Prima Divisione.) (E)	28	23
9	Brescia B	28	22
10	Orceana (E)	28	22
11	Rhodense	28	20
12	Trevigliese	28	19
13	Vis Nova Giussano	28	17
14	Vimercatese (Note: Relegated and later readmitted to Prima Divisione.)	28	14
15	Vogherese (Note: Retired after 25 matches and later readmitted to Prima Divisione.)	(25)	0 (Note: 3 points deducted.)
16	Pro Vercelli B	–	0 (Note: Retired before the start of the season.)

Source: Panini
(E) Eliminated

== Girone C ==
Pos	Team	Pld	Pts
1	Torino B (Note: "B" teams excluded from 1934–35 Prima Divisione for championship reform.)	28	43
2	Biellese	28	39
3	Casale B	28	36
4	Piacenza	28	35
5	Juventus B	28	33
6	Intra	28	32
7	Pinerolo	28	29
8	Saronno	28	29
9	Fanfulla	28	26
10	Asti	28	24
11	Cusiana Omegna	28	22
12	Gallaratese	28	21
13	Marelli Sesto S.G. (Note: Renounced to play in 1934–35 Prima Divisione.) (E)	28	19
14	Varese	28	17
15	US Sestese (Note: Relegated and later readmitted to Prima Divisione.)	28	15
16	Settimese (E)	–	0 (Note: Retired before the start of the season.)

Source: Panini
(E) Eliminated

== Girone D ==
Pos	Team	Pld	Pts
1	Parma	26	38
2	Reggiana	26	38
3	Forlimpopoli	26	31
4	Ferroviario Rimini (Note: Renounced to play in 1934–35 Prima Divisione.) (E)	26	30
5	Portuense	26	29
6	Bologna B (Note: "B" teams excluded from 1934–35 Prima Divisione for championship reform.)	26	28
7	Mantova	26	28
8	Forlì	26	26
9	Russi	26	24
10	Ravenna	26	24
11	Molinella	26	21
12	Libertas Rimini	26	21
13	Carpi (Note: Relegated and later readmitted to Prima Divisione.)	26	19
14	Casalecchio (R, E)	26	7

Source: Panini
(E) Eliminated; (R) Relegated

== Girone E ==
Pos	Team	Pld	Pts
1	Savona	30	47
2	Andrea Doria	30	45
3	Imperia	30	40
4	Entella	30	34
5	Ventimigliese	30	31 (Note: 1 point deducted.)
6	Genova 1893 B (Note: "B" teams excluded from 1934–35 Prima Divisione for championship reform.)	30	28
7	Sestrese	30	28
8	Vado	30	28
9	Alassio	30	28
10	Acqui	30	27
11	Alessandria B	30	27
12	Rapallo Ruentes	30	26
13	Corniglianese	30	26
14	Pontedecimo	30	25
15	Albenga (Note: Relegated and later readmitted to Prima Divisione.)	30	20
16	Rivarolese (T)	30	19

Source: Panini
(T) Qualified, but not yet for the particular phase indicated

== Girone F ==
Pos	Team	Pld	Pts
1	Lucchese	28	47
2	Pisa	28	40
3	Livorno B (Note: "B" teams excluded from 1934–35 Prima Divisione for championship reform.)	28	40
4	Prato	28	37
5	Siena	28	36
6	Carrarese	28	30
7	Montevarchi	28	27
8	Sempre Avanti	28	25
9	Pontedera	28	25
10	Fiorentina B	28	24
11	Torres	28	24
12	Grosseto	28	20
13	Empoli	28	20
14	Signe (Note: Relegated and later readmitted to Prima Divisione.)	28	15
15	Angelo Belloni (T)	28	10

Source: Panini
(T) Qualified, but not yet for the particular phase indicated

== Girone G ==
Pos	Team	Pld	Pts
1	L'Aquila	26	36
2	Foligno (D, E)	26	34 (Note: Disqualified for corruption and disbanded.)
3	Pescara (Note: T-B Pescara-Taranto 1-0)	26	33
4	Taranto	26	33
5	Lazio B (Note: "B" teams excluded from 1934–35 Prima Divisione for championship reform.)	26	32
6	Anconitana-Bianchi	26	32
7	Jesi	26	27
8	Fano Alma Juventus	26	24
9	Molfetta (Note: No more money) (D, R)	26	22
10	Sora	26	21
11	Fermana	26	21
12	Civitavecchia	26	20
13	Franco Tosi Taranto (E)	26	16
14	Sambenedettese (R)	26	9 (Note: 2 points deducted)
15	Ternana (Note: Retired before the start of the season.) (R)	–	0
16	Roma B	–	0

Source: Panini
(D) Disqualified; (E) Eliminated; (R) Relegated

== Girone H ==
Pos	Team	Pld	Pts
1	Catania	26	41
2	Siracusa	26	37
3	Salernitana	26	33
4	Reggina	26	28
5	Savoia	26	27
6	Cosenza	26	27
7	Napoli B (Note: "B" teams excluded from 1934–35 Prima Divisione for championship reform.)	26	24
8	Palmese	26	24
9	Palermo B	26	24
10	Nissena	26	16
11	Termini Imerese	26	13
12	Juventus Trapani	26	13 (Note: 1 point deducted.)
13	Bagnolese (Note: Relegated and later readmitted to Prima Divisione.)	26	16
14	Peloro Messina (E)	26	2

Source: Panini
(E) Eliminated

== Final rounds ==
=== Girone A ===
Pos	Team	Pld	Pts
1	L'Aquila (P)	6	7
2	Andrea Doria	6	7
3	Pro Gorizia	6	5
4	Falck Sesto S.G.	6	4

Source: Panini
(P) Promoted

=== Girone B ===
Pos	Team	Pld	Pts
1	Pisa (P)	6	7 (Note: Promoted after tie-breaker: Pisa-Udinese 3-1.)
2	Udinese	6	7
3	Piacenza	6	6
4	Parma	6	4

Source: Panini
(P) Promoted

=== Girone C ===
Pos	Team	Pld	Pts
1	Lucchese (P)	6	11
2	Siracusa	6	8
3	Pescara	6	3
4	Monza	6	2

Source: Panini
(P) Promoted

=== Girone D ===
Pos	Team	Pld	Pts
1	Catania (P)	6	8
2	Savona	6	7
3	Biellese	6	5
4	Reggiana	6	4

Source: Panini
(P) Promoted

Catania, L'Aquila, Lucchese and Pisa promoted to 1934–35 Serie B.
