= 1934–35 Prima Divisione =

Prima Divisione
- Season: 1934–35
- Promoted: Siena; Taranto
- Relegated: dozens of clubs

The 1934–35 Prima Divisione was the third level league of the 35th Italian football championship.

In 1928, FIGC had decided a reform of the league structure of Italian football. The top-level league was the National Division, composed by the two divisions of Serie A and Serie B. Under them, there were the local championship, the major one being the First Division, that in 1935 will take the name of Serie C. In order to allow the new league structure for 1935-36 season, the winners of the eight groups of First Division would be admitted to the final rounds, where two tickets of promotion to Serie B were available, while the last eight clubs of each group had to be relegated to the Regional Leagues.

== Legend ==
Qualified (for regular season's groups)
Promoted to Serie B
Admitted to Serie C
Relegated to Prima Divisione Regionale

== Girone A ==
Pos	Team	Pld	Pts
1	Udinese	24	39
2	Fiumana	24	35
3	Trento	24	32
4	Treviso	24	30
5	Rovigo	24	29
6	Pro Gorizia	24	29
7	DAM Valdagno (R)	24	26
8	Bolzano (R)	24	26
9	Pordenone (R)	24	24
10	Ponziana (R)	24	23
11	Palmanova (R)	24	12 (Note: 1 point deducted.)
12	Bassano (R)	24	12
13	Schio (R)	24	10
14	CRDA Monfalcone (R)	(13)	8 (Note: Retired after 13 matches. All their results were voided.)

Source: Panini
(R) Relegated

== Girone B ==
Pos	Team	Pld	Pts
1	Falck Sesto S.G.	26	39 (Note: Qualified after tie-breaker: Falck-Lecco 3-0.)
2	Lecco	26	39
3	Monza	26	36
4	Gallaratese	26	33
5	Crema	26	32
6	Fanfulla	26	32
7	Intrese (R)	26	28
8	Soresinese (Note: Renounced to play in Prima Divisione Regionale 1935–36.) (E)	26	21
9	Saronno (E)	26	20
10	Ardens Bergamo (R)	26	19
11	Vimercatese (R)	26	18
12	Pro Lissone (R)	26	17 (Note: 1 point deducted.)
13	Trevigliese (R)	26	16
14	Vis Nova Giussano (E)	26	13

Source: Panini
(E) Eliminated; (R) Relegated

== Girone C ==
Pos	Team	Pld	Pts
1	Andrea Doria	24	35
2	Pontedecimo	24	33
3	Asti	24	30
4	Rivarolese	24	24
5	Biellese	24	23
6	Cusiana Omegna	24	22
7	Pirelli Milano (R)	24	21
8	SIAI Marchetti (R)	24	21
9	Pinerolo (R)	24	21
10	Varese (R)	24	19
11	Vogherese (Note: Renounced to play in Prima Divisione Regionale 1935–36.) (E)	24	15
12	Saviglianese (E)	24	15
13	Rhodense (E)	22	14 (Note: Retired after 22 matches. The games played were considered valid.)
14	Stradellina (Note: Retired before the beginning of the championship.) (E)	-	0

Source: Panini
(E) Eliminated; (R) Relegated

== Girone D ==
Pos	Team	Pld	Pts
1	Sanremese	26	37
2	Savona	26	35
3	Sestrese	26	34
4	Imperia	26	32
5	Ventimigliese	26	32
6	Entella	26	31
7	Rapallo Ruentes (R)	26	30
8	Albenga (R)	26	25
9	Vado (R)	26	24
10	Acqui (Note: Renounced to play in Prima Divisione Regionale 1935–36.) (R)	26	23
11	Corniglianese (R)	26	22
12	Alassio (R)	26	17 (Note: 1 point deducted.)
13	Maurina Imperia (R)	26	11
14	Portuale Genova (E)	26	10

Source: Panini
(E) Eliminated; (R) Relegated

== Girone E ==
Pos	Team	Pld	Pts
1	Reggiana	26	38
2	Parma	26	37
3	Libertas Rimini	26	31
4	Piacenza	26	31
5	Forlimpopoli	26	31
6	Mantova	26	30
7	Portuense (Note: Renounced to play in Prima Divisione Regionale 1935–36. Imolese immediately created a new phoenix club.) (E)	26	29
8	Russi (R)	26	23
9	Ravenna (R)	26	23
10	Renato Serra (R)	26	23
11	Forlì (R)	26	21
12	Molinella (R)	26	19
13	Carpi (R)	26	18
14	Imolese (E)	26	9 (Note: 1 point deducted.)

Source: Panini
(E) Eliminated; (R) Relegated

== Girone F ==
Pos	Team	Pld	Pts
1	Siena	22	30
2	Montevarchi	22	29
3	Civitavecchiese	22	28
4	Empoli	22	25
5	Pontedera	22	24
6	Sempre Avanti	22	22
7	Signe (T)	22	22
8	Prato (T)	22	22
9	Grosseto (R)	22	22 (Note: 1 point deducted. Tie-breakers: SempreAvanti-Grosseto 3-3;1-1;2-0; LeSigne-Prato 2-0; final SempreAvanti-LeSigne 2-2;2-1.)
10	Carrarese (R)	22	21
11	Torres (Note: Renounced to play in Prima Divisione Regionale 1935–36.) (E)	12	11 (Note: Retired after 12 matches. The games played were considered valid.)
12	Angelo Belloni (E)	22	7
13	Montecatini (E)	12	2

Source: Panini
(E) Eliminated; (R) Relegated; (T) Qualified, but not yet for the particular phase indicated

== Girone G ==
Pos	Team	Pld	Pts
1	Taranto	22	34
2	Anconitana-Bianchi	22	32
3	Cerignola	22	28
4	Fermana	22	24
5	Jesina	22	22
6	Fano Alma Juventus	22	22
7	Pescara	22	22
8	Sulmona (R)	22	22 (Note: Tie-breakers: Jesi-Pescara 1-0, Fano-Sulmona 2-0. Pescara then used a wild card for 7th placed Southern teams.)
9	Manfredonia (R)	22	19
10	B. Frusino Frosinone (Note: Renounced to play in Prima Divisione Regionale 1935–36. Sora and Tiferno immediately created new phoenix clubs.) (E)	22	16
11	Sora (E)	22	12
12	Littorio Campobasso (E)	22	10 (Note: 1 point deducted.)
13	Tiferno (E)	-	0 (Note: Retired before the beginning of the championship.)

Source: Panini
(E) Eliminated; (R) Relegated

== Girone H ==
Pos	Team	Pld	Pts
1	Palmese	24	33
2	Trapani (Note: Renounced to play in Serie C 1935–36.) (D, R)	24	28
3	Nissena	24	28
4	Salernitana	24	28
5	Benevento	24	27
6	Bagnolese	24	25 (Note: Saved after tie-breaker: Bagnolese-Savoia 2-1. Savoia then used a wild card for 7th placed Southern teams.)
7	Savoia	24	25
8	Cosenza (Note: Relegated and later admitted to 1935–36 Serie C.) (T)	24	24
9	Lucano Potenza (T)	24	16 (Note: 1 point deducted.)
10	Alcamo (R)	24	16
11	Termini Imerese (R)	24	15
12	Siracusa (Note: Siracusa excluded from the championship and dissolved. Only the game played on first half of the season are considered valid. A phoenix club was created after the War of Ethiopia.) (E)	12	11
13	Reggina (Note: Reggina dissolved after the end of the season. A phoenix club was created after the War of Ethiopia.) (E)	24	7 (Note: 3 points deducted.)

Source: Panini
(D) Disqualified; (E) Eliminated; (R) Relegated; (T) Qualified, but not yet for the particular phase indicated

== Final rounds ==
=== Girone A ===
Pos	Team	Pld	Pts
1	Siena (P)	6	8 (Note: Promoted after tie-breaker: Reggiana-Siena 0-7.)
2	Reggiana	6	8
3	Udinese	6	7
4	Sanremese	6	0 (Note: 1 point deducted.)

Source: Panini
(P) Promoted

=== Girone B ===
Pos	Team	Pld	Pts
1	Taranto (P)	6	11
2	Falck Sesto S.G.	6	6
3	Andrea Doria	6	2 (Note: 1 point deducted.)
4	Palmese (E)	6	2 (Note: 2 points deducted.)

Source: Panini
(E) Eliminated; (P) Promoted

== Final ==
The final for the title of Italian champion of Prima Divisione wasn't played.

No book or sport newspaper (Gazzetta dello Sport and Il Littoriale) show proofs that the final was actually played.
