= 2022–23 Coppa Italia Serie D =

Tournament details
- Country: Italy
- Dates: 20 August 2022 – 27 May 2023
- Teams: 166

Tournament statistics
- Matches played: 100
- Goals scored: 242 (2.42 per match)
- All statistics correct as of 24 September 2022.

The 2022−23 Coppa Italia Serie D is the 23rd edition of Coppa Italia Serie D.

== Format and seeding ==
The teams enter the competition at various stage, as follows.

- First stage
  - Preliminary round: it is contested by 76 teams
  - First round: the 38 winners of the preliminary round and the 90 teams who did not play the preliminary round face each other
- Final stage
  - Round of 64: the 64 winners face each other
  - Round of 32: the 32 winners face each other
  - Round of 16: the 16 winners face each other
  - Quarter-finals: the 8 winners face each other
  - Semi-finals: the 4 winners face each other
  - Final: the 2 winners face each other

== Schedule ==
| Phase | Round | Clubs remaining | Clubs involved | From previous round | Entries in this round | Dates |
|---|---|---|---|---|---|---|
| First stage | Preliminary round | 166 | 76 | none | 76 | 20–21 August 2022; 14 September 2022; 24 September 2022 |
| First stage | First round | 128 | 128 | 38 | 90 | 27–29 August 2022; 4 September 2022; 19 October 2022; 26 October 2022 |
| Final stage | Round of 64 | 64 | 64 | 64 | none | 2 November 2022 |
| Final stage | Round of 32 | 32 | 32 | 32 | none | 7 December 2022 |
| Final stage | Round of 16 | 16 | 16 | 16 | none | 11 January 2023 |
| Final stage | Quarter-finals | 8 | 8 | 8 | none | TBD |
| Final stage | Semi-finals | 4 | 4 | 4 | none | 8 March 2023 |
| Final stage | Final | 2 | 2 | 2 | none | 27 May 2023 |

== Preliminary round ==
Preliminary round results
| Match no | Home team | Score | Away team |
20 August 2022
| 20. | Grosseto | 0–1 | Orvietana |
21 August 2022
| 1. | Portogruaro | 1–1 (5–4 p) | Torviscosa |
| 2. | Levico Terme | 2–0 | Virtus Bolzano |
| 3. | Villafranca | 2–2 (2–3 p) | Chievo Sona |
| 4. | Este | 2–0 | Montecchio Maggiore |
| 5. | Legnago | 2–2 (5–4 p) | Lumezzane |
| 6. | Fanfulla | 2–1 | Sant'Angelo |
| 7. | Ponte San Pietro | 0–2 | Villa Valle |
| 8. | Giana Erminio | 5–0 | Stresa |
| 9. | Real Calepina | 0–1 | Varesina |
| 10. | Seregno | 0–1 | Castanese |
| 11. | Pinerolo | 0–0 (3–5 p) | Chisola |
| 12. | Fossano | 1–0 | Pont Donnaz |
| 13. | Ligorna | 2–0 | Asti |
| 14. | Fezzanese | 1–0 | Tau Altopascio |
| 15. | Riccione | 1–1 (5–4 p) | Corticella |
| 16. | Bagnolese | 2–1 | Salsomaggiore |
| 17. | Pistoiese | 2–1 | Mobilieri Ponsacco |
| 18. | Real Forte Querceta | 2–1 | Ghiviborgo |
| 19. | Scandicci | 1–1 (4–3 p) | Terranuova Traiana |
| 21. | Fano | 1–0 | Vigor Senigallia |
| 22. | Porto d'Ascoli | 2–1 | Avezzano |
| 23. | Lupa Frascati | 2–0 | Pomezia |
| 24. | Tivoli | 2–0 | Real Monterotondo |
| 25. | Atletico Uri | 2–1 | Ilvamaddalena |
| 26. | Vastogirardi | 4–1 | Termoli |
| 27. | Cassino | 1–1 (2–3 p) | Gladiator |
| 28. | Paganese | 0–0 (3–4 p) | Puteolana |
| 29. | Angri | 0–0 (8–7 p) | Palmese |
| 30. | Barletta | 1–0 | Matese |
| 31. | Lavello | 2–2 (4–1 p) | Casarano |
| 32. | Nardò | 1–1 (4–2 p) | Martina |
| 33. | Matera | 0–1 | Team Altamura |
| 34. | Locri | 2–3 | Vibonese |
| 35. | Castrovillari | 1–2 | San Luca |
| 36. | Sancataldese | 0–0 (7–6 p) | Catania |
14 September 2022
| 37. | Livorno | 1–1 (4–2 p) | Sangiovannese |
| 38. | Ragusa | 1–1 (9–8 p) | Canicattì |

== First round ==
First round results
| Match no | Home team | Score | Away team |
27 August 2022
| 27. | Correggese | 1–0 | Forlì |
| 31. | Scandicci | 1–1 (4–5 p) | Prato |
| 54. | Francavilla | 2–2 (4–2 p) | Angri |
28 August 2022
| 1. | Cjarlins Muzane | 4–0 | Portogruaro |
| 2. | Dolomiti Bellunesi | 3–0 | Levico Terme |
| 3. | Chievo Sona | 0–2 | Caldiero Terme |
| 4. | Cartigliano | 3–5 | Este |
| 5. | Legnago | 2–0 | Luparense |
| 6. | Montebelluna | 2–1 | Mestre |
| 7. | Campodarsego | 0–3 | Union Clodiense |
| 8. | Adriese | 3–1 | Ravenna |
| 9. | Crema | 1–0 | Fanfulla |
| 10. | Breno | 2–2 (6–5 p) | Villa Valle |
| 11. | Alcione Milano | 4–1 | Folgore Caratese |
| 12. | Città di Varese | 0–0 (6–5 p) | Legnano |
| 13. | Castellanzese | 1–1 (3–4 p) | Arconatese |
| 14. | Casatese | 0–1 | Sporting Franciacorta |
| 15. | Virtus CiseranoBergamo | 1–1 (5–3 p) | Brusaporto |
| 16. | Desenzano | 2–2 (2–4 p) | Varesina |
| 17. | Caronnese | 1–1 (9–8 p) | Castanese |
| 18. | Gozzano | 0–1 | Giana Erminio |
| 19. | Bra | 1–0 | Sanremese |
| 20. | Chieri | 0–1 | Chisola |
| 21. | Vado | 0–1 | Ligorna |
| 22. | Fossano | 0–1 | Derthona |
| 23. | Borgosesia | 0–1 | Casale |
| 24. | Riccione | 1–0 | Sammaurese |
| 25. | Lentigione | 1–2 | Bagnolese |
| 26. | Carpi | 1–0 | Mezzolara |
| 28. | Seravezza | 5–3 | Real Forte Querceta |
| 29. | Pistoiese | 2–1 | Aglianese |
| 30. | Pianese | 0–1 | Poggibonsi |
| 32. | Fezzanese | 0–1 | Sestri Levante |
| 33. | Follonica Gavorrano | 2–3 | Orvietana |
| 35. | Sambenedettese | 0–0 (3–5 p) | Tolentino |
| 36. | Fano | 1–1 (4–1 p) | Montegiorgio |
| 37. | Pineto | 1–0 | San Nicolò Notaresco |
| 38. | Chieti | 0–1 | Porto d'Ascoli |
| 39. | Vastogirardi | 1–0 | Vastese |
| 40. | Montespaccato | 0–1 | Trastevere |
| 41. | Flaminia Civita Castellana | 3–0 | Vis Artena |
| 42. | Lupa Frascati | 2–0 | Ostia Mare |
| 43. | Cynthialbalonga | 1–3 | Tivoli |
| 44. | Aprilia | 1–3 | Roma City |
| 45. | Arzachena | 2–0 | Atletico Uri |
| 46. | Sarrabus Ogliastra | 3–2 | Team Nuova Florida |
| 47. | Real Aversa | 1–0 | Gladiator |
| 49. | Sorrento | 0–1 | Nocerina |
| 50. | Casertana | 3–0 | Mariglianese |
| 51. | Afragolese | 2–4 | Puteolana |
| 52. | Portici | 1–1 (5–4 p) | Barletta |
| 53. | Nardò | 0–1 | Lavello |
| 55. | Molfetta | 2–0 | Bitonto |
| 56. | Città di Fasano | 2–1 | Brindisi |
| 57. | Team Altamura | 1–1 (5–4 p) | Gravina |
| 59. | Cittanovese | 5–1 | San Luca |
| 60. | Vibonese | 1–3 | Città di Sant'Agata |
| 61. | Trapani | 2–1 | Licata |
| 62. | Sancataldese | 0–5 | Paternò |
29 August 2022
| 34. | Città di Castello | 2–2 (3–4 p) | Sporting Trestina |
| 48. | Cavese | 2–1 | Nola |
4 September 2022
| 58. | Santa Maria Cilento | 0–2 | Lamezia Terme |
19 October 2022
| 63. | Livorno | 3–4 | Arezzo |
26 October 2022
| 64. | Acireale | 3–0 | Ragusa |

== Round of 64 ==
Round of 64 results
| Match no | Home team | Score | Away team |
1 November 2022
| 27. | Varesina | 0–1 | Città di Varese |
2 November 2022
| 1. | Chisola | 1–3 | Bra |
| 2. | Ligorna | 2–1 | Sestri Levante |
| 3. | Casale | 0–1 | Derthona |
| 4. | Sporting Franciacorta | 3–1 | Breno |
| 5. | Arconatese | 3–0 | Caronnese |
| 6. | Giana Erminio | 2–1 | Alcione Milano |
| 7. | Cjarlins Muzane | 1–2 | Dolomiti Bellunesi |
| 8. | Union Clodiense | 2–1 | Legnago Salus |
| 9. | Caldiero Terme | 1–1 (4–5 p) | Montebelluna |
| 10. | Este | 1–3 | Adriese |
| 11. | Prato | 1–0 | Poggibonsi |
| 12. | Sporting Trestina | 0–2 | Orvietana Calcio |
| 13. | Porto d'Ascoli | 1–2 | Pineto |
| 14. | Roma City | 0–3 | Tivoli |
| 15. | Trastevere | 2–1 | Flaminia Civita Castellana |
| 16. | Puteolana | 0–0 | Molfetta Calcio |
| 17. | Cavese | 2–1 | Vastogirardi |
| 18. | Francavilla | 1–0 | Lavello |
| 19. | Nocerina | 3–3 | Portici |
| 20. | Città di Sant'Agata | 1–2 | Trapani |
| 21. | Arzachena | 0–1 | Sarrabus Ogliastra |
| 22. | Città di Fasano | 0–1 | Team Altamura |
| 23. | AC Carpi | 1–1 | United Riccione |
| 24. | Tolentino | 1–1 | Fano |
| 25. | Bagnolese | 3–2 | Correggese |
| 26. | Seravezza | 3–0 | Pistoiese |
9 November 2022
| 27. | Lupa Frascati | 1–2 | Arezzo |
| 28. | Lamezia Terme | 3–0 | Cittanovese |
| 29. | Acireale | 2–0 | Paternò |
| 30. | Crema | 1–1 | Virtus CiseranoBergamo |
16 November 2022
| 31. | Casertana | 3–2 | Real Aversa |

== Round of 32 ==
Round of 32 results
| Match no | Home team | Score | Away team |
30 November 2022
| 1. | Sarrabus Ogliastra | 1–0 | Tivoli |
7 December 2022
| 2. | Bra | 2–0 | Ligorna |
| 3. | Derthona | 1–1 | Crema |
| 4. | Città di Varese | 1–0 | Sporting Franciacorta |
| 5. | Arconatese | 1–3 | Giana Erminio |
| 6. | Dolomiti Bellunesi | 0–0 | Union Clodiense |
| 7. | Montebelluna | 1–2 | Adriese |
| 8. | United Riccione | 3–1 | Bagnolese |
| 9. | Orvietana Calcio | 1–2 | Arezzo |
| 10. | Puteolana | 1–0 | Trastevere |
| 11. | Francavilla | 2–0 | Casertana |
| 12. | Team Altamura | 0–2 | Cavese |
| 13. | Pineto | 5–1 | Tolentino |
| 14. | Seravezza | 2–3 | Prato |
14 December 2022
| 15. | Trapani | 7–0 | Acireale |
4 January 2023
| 16. | Portici | 1–2 | Lamezia Terme |

== Round of 16 ==
Round of 16 results
| Match no | Home team | Score | Away team |
11 January 2023
| 1. | Puteolana | 2–1 | Sarrabus Ogliastra |
| 2. | Giana Erminio | 2–0 | Città di Varese |
| 3. | Adriese | 6–0 | Union Clodiense |
| 4. | Prato | 0–1 | United Riccione |
| 5. | Arezzo | 1–2 | Pineto |
18 January 2023
| 6. | Crema | 3–1 | Bra |
25 January 2023
| 7. | Lamezia Terme | 1–1 | Trapani |
1 February 2023
| 8. | Cavese | 1–0 | Francavilla |

== Quarter-Finals ==
Quarter-Finals results
| Match no | Home team | Score | Away team |
22 February 2023
| 1. | United Riccione | 1–3 | Adriese |
| 2. | Pineto | 4–1 | Puteolana |
| 3. | Lamezia Terme | 1–1 | Cavese |
8 March 2023
| 4. | Crema | 1–1 | Giana Erminio |

== Semi-Finals ==
Semi-Finals results
| Match no | Home team | Score | Away team |
23 March 2023
| 1. | Giana Erminio | 1–0 | Adriese |
26 March 2023
| 2. | Lamezia Terme | 0–1 | Pineto |

== Final ==
Final result
| Match no | Home team | Score | Away team |
28 May 2023
| 1. | Pineto | 4–2 | Giana Erminio |
