= Sergio Sabatino =

Italian footballer

Personal information
- Date of birth: 20 April 1988 (age 38)
- Place of birth: Corleone, Italy
- Height: 1.78 m (5 ft 10 in)
- Position: Defender

Senior career*
Years	Team	Apps	(Gls)
2005–2007	Alcamo	49	(2)
2007–2009	Nissa		
2009–2010	Manfredonia	30	(0)
2010–2012	Taranto	20	(0)
2012	→ Trapani (loan)	18	(1)
2012–2013	Nocerina	5	(0)
2013–2014	Catanzaro	25	(2)
2014–2015	Savoia	17	(0)
2015	Arezzo	15	(1)
2015–2016	Akragas	16	(0)
2016–2018	Arezzo	71	(1)
2018–2019	Triestina	21	(0)
2019–2020	Sicula Leonzio	27	(0)
2020–2021	Messina	29	(2)
2021–2022	Fidelis Andria	14	(1)
2022	Lamezia Terme	11	(0)
2022–2023	Casertana	31	(0)
2023–2025	Trapani	56	(1)
- * Club domestic league appearances and goals as of 1 October 2025

Sergio Sabatino (born 20 April 1988) is an Italian professional footballer who plays as a defender.

== Club career ==
On 16 August 2021, he signed with Fidelis Andria. On 10 January 2022, his contract with Fidelis Andria was terminated by mutual consent. On the same day, he joined Lamezia Terme in Serie D.
