= Riccardo Innocenti (footballer, born 1974) =

Italian footballer

Personal information
- Date of birth: 15 October 1974 (age 52)
- Place of birth: Alfonsine, Italy
- Height: 1.85 m (6 ft 1 in)
- Position: Forward

Senior career*
| Years | Team | Apps | (Gls) |
| 1993–1994 | Argentana | 18 | (0) |
| 1994–1996 | Baracca Lugo | 2 | (0) |
| 1996–1998 | Massalombarda | 32 | (13) |
| 1998 | Russi | 39 | (11) |
| 1998–1999 | Rovigo | 23 | (10) |
| 1999–2001 | Montecchio | 63 | (37) |
| 2001–2003 | Gualdo | 62 | (8) |
| 2003–2004 | Pro Vasto | 34 | (20) |
| 2004–2006 | Gallipoli | 66 | (32) |
| 2006–2007 | Val di Sangro | 34 | (17) |
| 2007–2009 | Marcianise | 67 | (31) |
| 2009–2011 | Taranto | 37 | (11) |
| 2011 | Barletta | 14 | (6) |
| 2011–2013 | Andria | 46 | (9) |
| 2012 | → Fano (loan) | 19 | (2) |
| 2014 | Sorrento | 6 | (0) |
| 2015–2017 | Ravenna | 63 | (19) |
| 2017–2018 | Alfonsine | | |
| 2018 | Classe | 10 | (0) |
| 2018–2019 | Alfonsine | | |
| 2019 | Tre Fiori | | |
| 2019–2021 | Alfonsine | | |
| 2021 | Virtus | 8 | (1) |
| 2021–2022 | Classe | | |
| 2022–2023 | Urbino | | |
| 2023–2024 | Massalombarda | | |
- * Club domestic league appearances and goals as of 16 October 2026

Riccardo Innocenti (born 15 October 1974) is an Italian footballer who plays as a forward.

== Biography ==
=== Early career ===
Born in Alfonsine, the Province of Ravenna, Romagna region, Innocenti was an amateur/semi-pro player. He was the player of Argentana of 1993–94 Serie D (located in Argenta, Romagna region). In 1998 Innocenti was signed by Baracca Lugo, a team from his home province, in 1994–95 Serie C2.

=== "Amateur" hired gun ===
Innocenti was noted as a player of Massalombarda (located in the town of the same name, within the Ravenna province) of 1996–97 Eccellenza Emilia-Romagna (Italian regional league; sixth highest level until 2014). In the next season he won the league title for Russi (where he joined in January 1998), another Eccellenza team. Innocenti was signed by Serie D club Rovigo in November 1998, for the top level of regional league or one level below the fully professional league. In 1999–2000 he returned to Eccellenza level, but for Marche team Montecchio. He won the league title again for the de facto semi-professional team. Innocenti was a player for the same team in 2000–01 Serie D.

=== Serie C2 ===
In 2001, Innocenti was signed by his first fully professional club at age 26, Gualdo, in 2001–02 Serie C2. He spent two seasons in the town of Gualdo Tadino.

=== Serie D return ===
In 2003, Innocenti returned to Serie D for Pro Vasto. He was the top scorer of Group H of 2003–04 Serie D. The club also won the promotion playoffs of Group H against Bojano.

=== Gallipoli & Serie C2 return ===
In 2004, he was hired by another Serie D club, Gallipoli, also from Group H. Innocenti was the joint top scorer of the goal, along with Alessio Carlini. The club also won the group. At age 30, Innocenti once again returned to Serie C2 with Gallipoli and scored nine goals in 2005–06 Serie C2. Gallipoli won the Group C of the fourth division and was the runner-up in Supercoppa di Lega di Seconda Divisione among the three group winners.

In 2006 Innocenti was signed by Val di Sangro, where he scored 17 goals, 43% of the team total (just 39 goals). In 2007 Innocenti left for Marcianise, where he won promotion again as the promotion playoffs winner in 2008.

=== Serie C1 clubs ===
Innocenti tasted the third division football at age 33 and scored 15 goals, 47% of the team total (just 32 goals). In 2009, Innocenti was signed by fellow third division club Taranto, however his 18 appearances in 2009–10 Lega Pro Prima Divisione were half substitute and half starter. That season he scored only twice. Innocenti returned to starting eleven in 2010–11 Lega Pro Prima Divisione and scored nine goals in half season. On 17 January 2011, Innocenti was signed by fellow third division club Barletta. With his new teammates, Innocenti scored six times.

Innocenti was signed by another third division club, Andria, on 22 July 2011, in 1+1 year contract, on free transfer after he was released by Barletta on the same day. However, after scoring only two goals in half-season, he was loaned to fourth division club Fano. He failed to score. Innocenti became a player of Andria again in 2012–13 Lega Pro Prima Divisione. He started 28 games in a 30-round season. He was suspended once (forth caution of the season) and as a substitute once.

=== Back to Serie C2 ===
On 4 January 2014 he was signed by Sorrento as free agent.

== Honours ==
- Serie C2 Group C: 2006 (Gallipoli)
- Serie D Group H: 2005 (Gallipoli)
- Eccellenza Emilia-Romagna Group B: 1998 (Russi)
- Eccellenza Marche: 2000 (Montecchio)
