= Alessandro Provazza =

Italian footballer (born 2003)

Personal information
- Date of birth: 7 May 2003 (age 23)
- Place of birth: Reggio Calabria, Italy
- Height: 1.72 m (5 ft 8 in)
- Position: Left winger

Team information
- Current team: Reggina

Youth career
- 2020–2021: Reggina

Senior career*
| Years | Team | Apps | (Gls) |
| 2020–2021 | Reggina (U19) | 23 | (3) |
| 2021–2022 | → Lamezia Terme (loan) | 25 | (6) |
| 2022–2023 | → Vis Pesaro (loan) | 11 | (1) |
| 2023-2025 | Reggina | 72 | (13) |
| 2025 | San Marino Calcio | 4 | (0) |
| 2025-2026 | Igea Virtus | 17 | (0) |
- * Club domestic league appearances and goals as of 1 July 2026

Alessandro Provazza (born 7 May 2003) is an Italian professional footballer who plays as a left winger.

== Career ==
Alessandro Provazza embarked on his football career in the 2020–21 season, making a name for himself with Reggina's youth team, known as Reggina Sub 19, in the Campionato Primavera 2. During this season, he showcased remarkable talent and determination, participating in 21 matches and scoring 3 goals.

During the same period, he also took part in the Coppa Italia Primavera, engaging in a memorable match. Despite his young age, demonstrated a high sense of responsibility, impressing with top-notch performances.

In the 2021–22 season, Provazza made his debut in senior football, joining the Serie D team Lamezia Terme. This provided him with an opportunity to test himself at a more competitive level. Throughout his inaugural season with Lamezia Terme, he played 24 matches, scoring 6 goals, and providing 2 assists.

In the same season, Lamezia Terme participated in the promotion playoffs of Serie D Italia, with Alessandro playing a high-profile match, reaffirming his importance to the team and his desire to win.

In the 2022–23 season, Provazza moved to the Serie C team Vis Pesaro. During this season, he played 11 matches and scored 1 goal, contributing to the team's success.

In the following season, 2023–24, he returned to Reggio Calabria, joining Reggina (at the time called LFA Reggio Calabria), which restarted from Serie D. He left the team at the end of his contract on 1 July 2025, having made 72 appearances and scored 13 goals.
