= Francesco Salandria =

Italian footballer

Personal information
- Date of birth: 18 April 1995 (age 31)
- Place of birth: Trebisacce, Italy
- Height: 1.70 m (5 ft 7 in)
- Position: Midfielder

Youth career
- –2008: Albidona
- 2008–2014: Reggina

Senior career*
Years	Team	Apps	(Gls)
2014–2015	Reggina	24	(0)
2015–2017	Akragas	52	(1)
2017–2018	Matera	42	(1)
2018–2020	Reggina	35	(1)
2020	Catania	8	(1)
2020–2021	Viterbese	34	(0)
2021–2022	Lamezia Terme	31	(2)
2022–2023	Cavese	13	(0)
2023	Fidelis Andria	12	(0)
2023–2026	Reggina	57	(0)

International career
2013	Italy U18	1	(0)
- * Club domestic league appearances and goals as of 4 November 2026

Francesco Salandria (born 18 April 1995) is an Italian footballer who plays as a midfielder.

== Club career ==
He made his Serie B debut for Reggina on 25 May 2014 in a game against Avellino. On 10 June 2018, he returned to Reggina, signing a two-year deal.

On 24 January 2020 he joined Catania on a 1.5-year contract.

On 16 September 2020 he moved to Viterbese on a 2-year contract.

On 25 August 2021, he joined Lamezia Terme in Serie D.

On 25 January 2023, Salandria returned to Serie C and signed with Fidelis Andria.
