= Cherif Karamoko =

Guinean footballer

Personal information
- Full name: Cherif Karamoko
- Date of birth: 3 May 2000 (age 26)
- Place of birth: Nzérékoré, Guinea
- Position: Right winger

Team information
- Current team: Unione Cadoneghe

Youth career
- 2019: Padova

Senior career*
| Years | Team | Apps | (Gls) |
| 2019–2020 | Padova | 1 | (0) |
| 2020 | → Adriese (loan) | 5 | (0) |
| 2021–2022 | US Arcella | | |
| 2022–2023 | Spinea 1966 | | |
| 2023–2024 | Unione Cadoneghe | | |
| 2024 | US Arcella | | |
| 2024– | Unione Cadoneghe | | |
- * Club domestic league appearances and goals as of 22:06, 8 August 2021 (UTC)

Cherif Karamoko (born 3 May 2000) is a Guinean footballer who plays as a right winger for Italian club Unione Cadoneghe.

== Club career ==
=== Early years ===
Karamoko was born in Nzérékoré, Guinea. A war between the various ethnic groups of his country killed his father, who was an imam, when Cherif was only 13 years old, while his mother died of ebola in 2015 two years later. Karamoko then fled to Libya with his older brother, Mory, who had found a job in the country. In seven months they crossed Mali, Burkina Faso, Niger and Libya. In Libya, Cherif was jailed for two months in Tripoli and his brother was demanded to pay 2000 dinars to get him out. Mory worked to earn the money, so he could get Cherif out of jail.

In the spring 2017, Karamoko and Mory left Libya on a boat for Italy. The boat, which could accommodate a maximum of 60 people, carried 143 on board. The boat sank on its way to Italy and Mory died on the way alongside 119 others, while Cherif made it to Calabria, Italy, where he woke up in the hospital with the news that his brother did not make it.

=== Padova ===
Karamoko was put in a reception center in Battaglia Terme in the Province of Padua, after arriving til Calabria. He started in school to learn the language and was training all the time to get fit. During a tournament between refugees in the reception center, he was named the best player of the tournament and was later reported to the youth sector of various teams, including Calcio Padova. In May 2018, Karamoko got a trial with Padova. He then began training with the Primavera team, but due to the rules, he was not able to play for eight months. He was only training, until the paperwork was sorted and he was then registered on 15 February 2019.

Karamoko got his debut for the Primavera one day later, on 16 February 2019. On 11 May 2019, he was summoned to the first team and got his Serie B debut for Padova against Livorno, when he came on from the bench with one minute left in the last game of the 2019–20 season.

In 2019–20, he was on the bench for Padova in seven games, without making any appearances. To get some more playing time, Karamoko was loaned out to Serie D club U.S. Adriese in January 2020 for the rest of the season. Karamoko made five league appearances for the club before returning to Padova in the summer of 2020.

However, after returning, Karamoko's provisional residence permit expired, preventing him from playing and he left Padova in the summer.

=== Later career ===
In November 2021, Karamoko joined Italian Eccellenza club US Arcella. In the summer 2022, he moved to fellow league club FC Spinea 1966. Ahead of the 2023–24, Karamoko moved to Unione Cadoneghe.

In the summer 2024, Karamoko moved to fellow Eccellenza club US Arcella. On December 8, 2024, he returned to Unione Cadoneghe.

== Personal life ==
In January 2021, the Italian author, Giulio Di Feo, published a book together with Cherif Karamoko, on the life and flight of Karamoko from Guinea to Italy.
