= Gabriel Chironi =

Argentine footballer

Personal information
- Date of birth: 16 December 1991 (age 34)
- Place of birth: Neuquén, Argentina
- Height: 1.68 m (5 ft 6 in)
- Position: Midfielder

Team information
- Current team: Acireale
- Number: 6

Senior career*
Years	Team	Apps	(Gls)
2010–2014	Cipolletti	88	(1)
2014–2016	Crucero del Norte	44	(2)
2016–2018	Estudiantes de San Luis	48	(2)
2018–2019	Cipolletti	21	(2)
2019	Castrovillari	11	(1)
2019–2020	Savoia	8	(2)
2020–2022	Linense	48	(1)
2022–2023	Fasano	14	(0)
2023	Lamezia	3	(1)
2023–2024	Santa Maria Cilento	17	(0)
2024–	Acireale	6	(0)
- * Club domestic league appearances and goals as of 20 November 2024

Gabriel Chironi (born 16 December 1991) is an Argentine footballer who plays for Italian Serie D club Acireale as a midfielder.
