= Riccardo Innocenti =

Riccardo Innocenti is an Italian name, may refer to:

- Riccardo Innocenti (footballer born 1943) (1943–2026), active in Serie A and Serie B
- Riccardo Innocenti (footballer born 1974), active in Serie C
