= Eccellenza Emilia-Romagna =

Italian football league

- Organising body: Lega Nazionale Dilettanti
- Founded: 1991
- Country: Italy
- Confederation: UEFA
- Divisions: 2
- Number of clubs: 36
- Promotion to: Serie D
- Relegation to: Promozione Emilia-Romagna
- League cup: Coppa Italia Dilettanti
- Current champions: Tropical Coriano (Group A); Correggese (Group B) (2024–25)
- Most championships: Bagnolese (4 titles)
- Website: https://www.lnd.it

Eccellenza Emilia-Romagna is the regional Eccellenza football division for clubs in Emilia-Romagna, Italy. It is competed amongst 36 teams, in two different groups (A and B). The winners of the Groups are promoted to Serie D. The club who finishes second also have the chance to gain promotion, they are entered into a national play-off which consists of two rounds.

== Champions ==
Here are the past champions of the Emilia-Romagna Eccellenza, organised into their respective group.

=== Group A ===
- 1991–92 Fidenza
- 1992–93 Reggiolo
- 1993–94 Sassolese San Giorgio
- 1994–95 Mantova
- 1995–96 Virtus Pavullese
- 1996–97 Virtus Castelfranco
- 1997–98 Casalese
- 1998–99 Bagnolese
- 1999–2000 Poggese
- 2000–01 Lentigione
- 2001–02 Virtus Pavullese
- 2002–03 Bagnolese
- 2003–04 Virtus Castelfranco
- 2004–05 Castellarano
- 2005–06 Fidenza
- 2006–07 Crociati Parma
- 2007–08 Fiorenzuola
- 2008–09 Dorando Pietri
- 2009–10 Bagnolese
- 2010–11 BettolaPonte
- 2011–12 Formigine
- 2012–13 Piacenza
- 2013–14 Fiorenzuola
- 2014–15 Lentigione
- 2015–16 Castelvetro
- 2016–17 Vigor Carpaneto
- 2017–18 Axys Zola
- 2018–19 Correggese
- 2019–20 Bagnolese
- 2020–21 Borgo San Donnino
- 2021–22 Corticella
- 2022–23 Borgo San Donnino
- 2023–24 Cittadella Vis Modenao
- 2024–25 Tropical Coriano

=== Group B ===
- 1991–92 Argentana
- 1992–93 San Marino
- 1993–94 Imola
- 1994–95 Iperzola
- 1995–96 Boca Bologna
- 1996–97 San Marino
- 1997–98 Russi
- 1998–99 Bellaria Igea Marina
- 1999–2000 Mezzolara
- 2000–01 Boca Bologna
- 2001–02 Ravenna
- 2002–03 Cattolica
- 2003–04 Reno Centese
- 2004–05 Cervia
- 2005–06 Giacomense
- 2006–07 Real Cesenatico
- 2007–08 Comacchio Lidi
- 2008–09 Valleverde Riccione
- 2009–10 Forlì
- 2010–11 Riccione
- 2011–12 Castenaso
- 2012–13 Romagna Centro
- 2013–14 Ribelle Castiglione
- 2014–15 Sammaurese
- 2015–16 Alfonsine
- 2016–17 Rimini
- 2017–18 Savignanese
- 2018–19 Alfonsine
- 2019–20 Marignanese
- 2020–21 Not awarded
- 2021–22 Fya Riccione
- 2022–23 Victor San Marino
- 2023–24 Sasso Marconi
- 2024–25 Correggese
