= Giusto Priola =

Italian footballer

Personal information
- Date of birth: 26 May 1990 (age 36)
- Place of birth: Palermo, Italy
- Height: 1.81 m (5 ft 11 in)
- Position: Defender

Team information
- Current team: Città di Varese
- Number: 6

Senior career*
Years	Team	Apps	(Gls)
2010	Vittoria		
2010	Mazara	15	(0)
2011–2014	Trapani	44	(0)
2014–2015	Bassano Virtus	41	(0)
2015–2016	Catanzaro	8	(0)
2016	→ Pistoiese (loan)	18	(0)
2016–2018	Pistoiese	56	(0)
2017–2019	Renate	26	(1)
2019–2020	Picerno	13	(0)
2020–2021	Bisceglie	37	(1)
2021	Giarre	12	(0)
2021–2022	Villa Valle	19	(0)
2022	Seregno	11	(0)
2022–2023	Chieri	22	(0)
2023–2024	Villa Valle	29	(1)
2024–	Città di Varese	9	(0)
- * Club domestic league appearances and goals as of 19 November 2024

Giusto Priola (born 26 May 1990) is an Italian football player who plays for Serie D club Città di Varese.

== Club career ==
He made his Serie C debut for Trapani on 4 September 2011 in a game against Prato.

On 10 October 2019 he signed with Picerno.

On 7 August 2021 he joined Giarre in Serie D.
