= Polisportiva Virtus Castelfranco Calcio =

Association football club in Italy

Virtus Castelfranco
- Full name: Polisportiva Virtus Castelfranco Emilia Calcio
- Nicknames: Castello (The Castle), Biancogialli (The White & Yellow)
- Short name: Virtus
- Founded: 1991; 35 years ago
- Ground: Stadio Fausto Ferrarini
- Capacity: 1,280
- President: Diego Di Cosmo
- Head coach: Francesco Cattani
- League: Eccellenza
- 2023–2024: Eccellenza Emilia-Romagna Group A, 5 of 18
- Website: www.virtuscastelfranco.it
Home colours	Away colours

Polisportiva Virtus Castelfranco Emilia Calcio, commonly known as Virtus Castelfranco or Castelfranco (pronounced [kaˌstɛlˈfraŋko]), is an Italian football club based in Castelfranco Emilia, Emilia-Romagna, who compete in Eccellenza, the fifth tier of the Italian football league system.

== History ==
Founded in 1991 following the merger of two local clubs — Polisportiva Castelfranco and Virtus Castelfranco — the newly formed team began its journey in the Prima Categoria. Within just five years, it earned promotion to the highest level of amateur football, where it has since competed in seventeen seasons.

In the season 1996–97 it was promoted from Eccellenza Emilia–Romagna to Serie D for the first time in their history.

== Colors and badge ==
Its colors are white and yellow.
