= Mathew Olorunleke =

Nigerian footballer

Personal information
- Date of birth: 4 October 1983 (age 43)
- Place of birth: Gusau, Nigeria
- Height: 1.83 m (6 ft 0 in)
- Position: Defender

Team information
- Current team: Bagnolese (head coach)

Senior career*
Years	Team	Apps	(Gls)
2001–2002	Bagnolese	17	(3)
2002–2003	Trento	33	(0)
2003–2004	Nocerina	32	(1)
2004–2005	Reggiana	30	(1)
2005–2007	Messina	2	(0)
2005–2006	→ Catanzaro (loan)	12	(0)
2007–2008	Juve Stabia	13	(0)
2008	Lecco	0	(0)
2008–2009	Rovigo	15	(0)
2009–2010	Nocerina	12	(0)
2010–2011	Bagnolese	14	(0)

Managerial career
- 2012: Bagnolese (head coach)
- 2012: Bagnolese (assistant coach)
- 2012–: Bagnolese (head coach)
- * Club domestic league appearances and goals as of 13:34, 19 June 2012 (UTC)

Mathew Olorunleke (born 4 October 1983) is a Nigerian professional footballer turned manager, who currently serves as head coach of Bagnolese.

== Career ==
=== Playing career ===
Olorunleke has had his entire playing career in Italy, starting with Bagnolese. He then moved on to Trento, Nocerina, Reggiana, Messina, Catanzaro, Juve Stabia, Lecco and Nocerina. He returned at Bagnolese in 2010 as a player/assistant manager.

=== Coaching career ===
He retired in 2011 but stayed at Bagnolese as assistant manager to Ivano Vacondio.

In summer 2012 he was promoted as new head coach, replacing Vacondio himself until October 2012, when he was renamed as his assistant. In December 2012 he was renamed head coach of the team.
