= Luca Santonocito =

Italian footballer (born 1991)

Personal information
- Date of birth: 11 February 1991 (age 35)
- Place of birth: Mariano Comense, Italy
- Height: 1.78 m (5 ft 10 in)
- Position: Midfielder

Team information
- Current team: Virtus CiseranoBergamo

Youth career
- 2005–2007: Inter Milan
- 2007–2010: Celtic
- 2010–2011: Milan

Senior career*
Years	Team	Apps	(Gls)
2011–2014	Milan	0	(0)
2011–2012	→ Südtirol (loan)	8	(0)
2012–2013	→ Renate (loan)	13	(1)
2013–2014	→ Monza (loan)	5	(0)
2014–2015	Borgomanero	14	(1)
2015	Gallipoli	13	(2)
2015–2016	Folgore Caratese	35	(19)
2016–2017	Monza	31	(8)
2017–2019	Bustese	44	(10)
2019	Fanfulla	18	(2)
2019–2020	Caravaggio	24	(8)
2020	Caronnese	9	(2)
2021–2022	Arconatese	61	(30)
2022–2023	Seregno	23	(4)
2023–	Virtus CiseranoBergamo	1	(0)

International career
2006	Italy U-17	1	(0)
- * Club domestic league appearances and goals as of 20 December 2023

Luca Santonocito (born 11 February 1991) is an Italian professional footballer who plays for Serie D club Virtus CiseranoBergamo. Besides Italy, he has played in Scotland.

== Honours ==
=== Club ===
Monza

- Serie D: 2016-17
- Scudetto Dilettanti: 2016-17
