= ASD Boca San Lazzaro =

Italian football club

Boca San Lazzaro
- Full name: Associazione Sportiva Dilettantistica Boca San Lazzaro
- Nickname: Boca
- Founded: 1966
- Dissolved: 2010
- Ground: Stadio Kennedy, San Lazzaro di Savena, Italy
- Capacity: 2500
Home colours	Away colours

Associazione Sportiva Dilettantistica Boca San Lazzaro was an Italian association football club from Bologna, Emilia-Romagna.

== History ==
The club was founded in 1966 as Associazione Calcio Boca. In 2002 the club merged with Felsina San Lazzaro (a team from San Lazzaro di Savena founded in 1930 as F.C. San Lazzaro), and its denomination changed to A.C. Boca San Lazzaro. The club has played Serie D/C in 2005–06, winning it and gaining the right to play 2006–07 season in Serie C2. However, the team relegated to Serie D after just a single season, being defeated on playoffs by Sansovino, and successively even to Eccellenza.

In June 2009, A.C. Boca detached itself from F.C. San Lazzaro and acquired the league rights from newly promoted Serie D club Dorando Pietri Carpi, which was abandoned after its shareholders opted to join forces with Carpi FC 1909. The club chose for a merger with Prima Categoria outfit Vignolese to bypass Serie D relocation laws (that do not allow to move sport rights to a province from another: Boca could not move to the province of Modena from Bologna but Vignola could move to Carpi), and played its home games in Vignola for the 2009–10 season. F.C. San Lazzaro maintained its place in 2009–10 Eccellenza. Both clubs dissolved in 2010.

== Notable former managers ==
- (Italy) Alberto Zaccheroni
