= 1933–34 Serie B =

Italian football league season

Serie B
- Season: 1933–34
- Champions: Sampierdarenese; 1st title

The Serie B 1933–34 was the fifth tournament of this competition played in Italy since its creation. This championship was organized with two groups and a final round to determine the promoted team.

== Teams ==
Viareggio, Perugia and Foggia had been promoted from Prima Divisione, while Bari and Pro Patria had been relegated from Serie A. Atalanta and Pistoiese had been re-elected by the Higher Directory to expand the league.

More, during the summer the FIGC decided to abolish with immediate effect the round robin as too expensive, and Catanzaro, Seregno, SPAL, Pavia, Vicenza and Derthona were invited to join.

As the fascist authorities forbade a natural North-South division, a strange West-East partition was established.

== Qualification ==
=== Group A ===
Serie B 1933-34 Girone A team distribution

==== Final classification ====
| Pos | Team | Pld | W | D | L | GF | GA | GR | Pts | Qualification or relegation |
|---|---|---|---|---|---|---|---|---|---|---|
| 1 | Sampierdarenese (A) | 24 | 16 | 4 | 4 | 42 | 16 | 2.625 | 36 | Qualification to Final Round |
| 2 | Vigevanesi (A) | 24 | 12 | 9 | 3 | 45 | 22 | 2.045 | 33 | Qualification to Final Round |
| 3 | Pro Patria (A) | 24 | 13 | 4 | 7 | 49 | 25 | 1.960 | 30 | Qualification to Final Round |
| 4 | Novara | 24 | 13 | 2 | 9 | 53 | 30 | 1.767 | 28 | |
| 5 | Messina | 24 | 11 | 5 | 8 | 38 | 28 | 1.357 | 27 | |
| 6 | Viareggio | 24 | 11 | 4 | 9 | 30 | 32 | 0.938 | 26 | |
| 7 | Catanzarese | 24 | 8 | 9 | 7 | 39 | 31 | 1.258 | 25 | |
| 7 | Spezia | 24 | 7 | 11 | 6 | 24 | 26 | 0.923 | 25 | |
| 9 | Seregno | 24 | 8 | 8 | 8 | 33 | 31 | 1.065 | 24 | |
| 10 | Pavia | 24 | 6 | 6 | 12 | 21 | 44 | 0.477 | 18 | |
| 11 | Legnano | 24 | 5 | 6 | 13 | 20 | 38 | 0.526 | 16 | |
| 12 | Cagliari (T) | 24 | 6 | 3 | 15 | 22 | 61 | 0.361 | 14 (Note: Cagliari had one point deducted.) | Reinstated (Note: Cagliari, Derthona, Serenissima Venezia and Vicenza were later readmitted to Serie B due to reforming of the championship.) |
| 13 | Derthona (T) | 24 | 2 | 5 | 17 | 17 | 49 | 0.347 | 9 | Reinstated |

Source: Panini
(A) Advance to a further round; (T) Qualified, but not yet for the particular phase indicated

==== Results ====
| Home \ Away | CAG | CTZ | DER | LEG | MES | NOV | PAV | PPA | SAM | SER | SPE | VIA | VIG |
|---|---|---|---|---|---|---|---|---|---|---|---|---|---|
| Cagliari | | 1–2 | 2–0 | 2–1 | 0–2 | 5–3 | 3–0 | 0–2 | 1–1 | 1–0 | 1–1 | 1–0 | 1–3 |
| Catanzarese | 10–0 | | 6–0 | 2–2 | 1–1 | 3–2 | 2–1 | 1–0 | 1–2 | 0–0 | 0–0 | 2–2 | 2–2 |
| Derthona | 3–0 | 1–3 | | 1–0 | 2–2 | 1–1 | 1–4 | 1–2 | 0–0 | 1–3 | 0–0 | 1–3 | 0–1 |
| Legnano | 0–0 | 1–1 | 1–0 | | 2–1 | 1–2 | 1–1 | 1–0 | 2–0 | 1–1 | 1–1 | 0–1 | 1–2 |
| Messina | 4–2 | 1–0 | 2–0 | 2–0 | | 1–1 | 5–1 | 1–0 | 3–0 | 4–1 | 1–1 | 3–1 | 2–1 |
| Novara | 4–0 | 4–0 | 1–0 | 6–0 | 1–0 | | 4–0 | 5–0 | 0–1 | 3–1 | 2–0 | 6–0 | 3–2 |
| Pavia | 3–1 | 0–0 | 2–1 | 0–3 | 0–0 | 2–1 | | 1–3 | 0–0 | 2–1 | 0–0 | 1–0 | 1–1 |
| Pro Patria | 4–0 | 1–1 | 5–0 | 3–0 | 2–0 | 3–0 | 3–0 | | 3–4 | 1–1 | 6–2 | 2–0 | 1–1 |
| Sampierdarenese | 5–0 | 2–0 | 3–0 | 1–0 | 4–0 | 0–1 | 4–0 | 1–0 | | 2–0 | 1–0 | 5–0 | 1–0 |
| Seregno | 4–0 | 4–0 | 0–0 | 3–1 | 1–0 | 4–2 | 2–1 | 0–5 | 1–2 | | 1–2 | 2–0 | 0–0 |
| Spezia | 1–0 | 1–2 | 1–0 | 2–0 | 2–1 | 1–0 | 4–1 | 2–2 | 0–0 | 1–1 | | 0–3 | 0–0 |
| Viareggio | 3–1 | 2–0 | 3–1 | 4–1 | 2–1 | 2–0 | 1–0 | 0–1 | 0–2 | 0–0 | 2–1 | | 1–1 |
| Vigevanesi | 5–0 | 1–0 | 4–3 | 2–0 | 3–1 | 3–1 | 3–0 | 3–0 | 4–1 | 2–2 | 1–1 | 0–0 | |

Updated to match(es) played on unknown. Source: Almanacco Illustrato del Calcio - La Storia 1898-2004, Panini Edizioni, Modena, September 2005 (in Italian)
Legend: Blue = home team win; Yellow = draw; Red = away team win.

=== Group B ===
Serie B 1933-34 Girone B team distribution

==== Final classification ====
| Pos | Team | Pld | W | D | L | GF | GA | GR | Pts | Qualification or relegation |
|---|---|---|---|---|---|---|---|---|---|---|
| 1 | Perugia (A) | 24 | 14 | 5 | 5 | 46 | 32 | 1.438 | 33 | Qualification to Final Round |
| 2 | Modena (A) | 24 | 13 | 6 | 5 | 44 | 19 | 2.316 | 32 | Qualification to Final Round |
| 3 | Bari (A) | 24 | 12 | 6 | 6 | 41 | 25 | 1.640 | 30 | Qualification to Final Round |
| 4 | Comense | 24 | 12 | 4 | 8 | 38 | 29 | 1.310 | 28 | |
| 5 | Atalanta | 24 | 9 | 8 | 7 | 31 | 24 | 1.292 | 26 | |
| 6 | Grion Pola | 24 | 10 | 5 | 9 | 41 | 34 | 1.206 | 25 | |
| 7 | Foggia | 24 | 9 | 6 | 9 | 39 | 40 | 0.975 | 24 | |
| 8 | Cremonese | 24 | 7 | 6 | 11 | 26 | 32 | 0.813 | 20 | |
| 8 | S.P.A.L. | 24 | 6 | 8 | 10 | 34 | 43 | 0.791 | 20 | |
| 8 | Pistoiese | 24 | 6 | 8 | 10 | 33 | 44 | 0.750 | 20 | |
| 11 | Verona | 24 | 6 | 6 | 12 | 25 | 47 | 0.532 | 18 | Relegation tie-breaker |
| 12 | Vicenza (T) | 24 | 7 | 4 | 13 | 31 | 42 | 0.738 | 18 | Relegation tie-breaker |
| 13 | Serenissima Venezia (T) | 24 | 6 | 6 | 12 | 28 | 46 | 0.609 | 18 | Relegation tie-breaker |

Source: Panini
(A) Advance to a further round; (T) Qualified, but not yet for the particular phase indicated

==== Results ====
| Home \ Away | ATA | BAR | COM | CRE | FOG | GRP | MOD | PER | PST | SEV | SPA | HEL | VIC |
|---|---|---|---|---|---|---|---|---|---|---|---|---|---|
| Atalanta | | 1–1 | 3–0 | 2–0 | 0–0 | 2–1 | 0–1 | 0–2 | 5–0 | 1–0 | 0–1 | 2–0 | 3–2 |
| Bari | 0–0 | | 2–1 | 3–0 | 1–0 | 2–0 | 1–0 | 2–0 | 6–2 | 5–0 | 2–0 | 3–0 | 1–1 |
| Comense | 1–1 | 2–1 | | 3–0 | 1–0 | 3–2 | 0–2 | 2–0 | 0–0 | 4–0 | 1–0 | 6–0 | 2–0 |
| Cremonese | 1–1 | 2–1 | 0–0 | | 3–0 | 1–1 | 1–2 | 3–0 | 2–0 | 3–1 | 3–4 | 2–1 | 1–1 |
| Foggia | 1–2 | 2–1 | 3–1 | 2–0 | | 6–2 | 2–0 | 2–2 | 1–1 | 3–2 | 5–1 | 1–2 | 2–1 |
| Grion Pola | 2–0 | 1–0 | 0–0 | 2–0 | 3–1 | | 1–1 | 5–0 | 2–1 | 0–2 | 3–1 | 6–0 | 3–2 |
| Modena | 2–2 | 4–0 | 5–0 | 2–0 | 5–0 | 1–0 | | 0–1 | 2–0 | 3–0 | 1–1 | 2–1 | 4–1 |
| Perugia | 2–1 | 1–1 | 3–1 | 1–0 | 5–2 | 2–0 | 2–1 | | 1–1 | 4–2 | 4–2 | 5–0 | 5–0 |
| Pistoiese | 2–2 | 1–1 | 2–1 | 1–2 | 4–2 | 2–0 | 1–1 | 1–2 | | 4–1 | 2–1 | 2–2 | 3–0 |
| Serenissima V. | 1–1 | 4–1 | 4–2 | 0–0 | 1–1 | 1–1 | 1–0 | 0–3 | 2–0 | | 4–1 | 1–1 | 0–1 |
| SPAL | 3–1 | 2–3 | 0–2 | 1–1 | 1–1 | 2–2 | 2–2 | 0–0 | 4–0 | 0–0 | | 2–1 | 2–1 |
| Hellas Verona | 0–1 | 0–2 | 1–3 | 1–0 | 1–1 | 2–1 | 1–1 | 5–0 | 1–1 | 2–0 | 2–2 | | 1–0 |
| Vicenza | 1–0 | 1–1 | 0–2 | 2–1 | 0–1 | 2–3 | 1–2 | 1–1 | 3–2 | 5–1 | 2–1 | 3–0 | |

Updated to match(es) played on unknown. Source: Almanacco Illustrato del Calcio - La Storia 1898-2004, Panini Edizioni, Modena, September 2005 (in Italian)
Legend: Blue = home team win; Yellow = draw; Red = away team win.

==== Relegation tie-breaker ====
Classification

| Pos | Team | Pld | W | D | L | GF | GA | GR | Pts | Promotion or relegation |
|---|---|---|---|---|---|---|---|---|---|---|
| 1 | Verona | 4 | 2 | 2 | 0 | 4 | 2 | 2.000 | 6 | Saved |
| 2 | Vicenza | 4 | 2 | 1 | 1 | 6 | 3 | 2.000 | 5 | Readmitted (Note: Cagliari, Derthona, Serenissima Venezia and Vicenza were later readmitted to Serie B due to reforming of the championship.) |
| 3 | Serenissima Venezia | 4 | 0 | 1 | 3 | 1 | 5 | 0.200 | 1 | Readmitted |

Source: Panini
Notes:

Results

| Home \ Away | SEV | HEL | VIC |
|---|---|---|---|
| Serenissima V. | | 0–0 | 0–1 |
| Hellas Verona | 1–0 | | 2–1 |
| Vicenza | 3–1 | 1–1 | |

Updated to match(es) played on unknown. Source: Almanacco Illustrato del Calcio - La Storia 1898-2004, Panini Edizioni, Modena, September 2005 (in Italian)
Legend: Blue = home team win; Yellow = draw; Red = away team win.

== Final round ==
=== Final classification ===
| Pos | Team | Pld | W | D | L | GF | GA | GR | Pts | Promotion or relegation |
|---|---|---|---|---|---|---|---|---|---|---|
| 1 | Sampierdarenese (P) | 10 | 5 | 4 | 1 | 14 | 9 | 1.556 | 14 | Serie A after tie-breaker |
| 2 | Bari | 10 | 6 | 2 | 2 | 17 | 9 | 1.889 | 14 | Promotion tie-breaker |
| 3 | Modena | 10 | 4 | 3 | 3 | 13 | 7 | 1.857 | 11 | |
| 4 | Pro Patria | 10 | 2 | 5 | 3 | 8 | 10 | 0.800 | 9 | |
| 5 | Vigevanesi | 10 | 3 | 2 | 5 | 8 | 10 | 0.800 | 8 | |
| 6 | Perugia | 10 | 1 | 2 | 7 | 5 | 20 | 0.250 | 4 | |

Source: Panini
(P) Promoted

=== Results ===
| Home \ Away | BAR | MOD | PER | PPA | SAM | VIG |
|---|---|---|---|---|---|---|
| Bari | | 1–0 | 2–1 | 1–1 | 4–0 | 2–0 |
| Modena | 2–1 | | 6–0 | 2–0 | 1–1 | 0–0 |
| Perugia | 1–2 | 1–0 | | 0–2 | 0–2 | 1–1 |
| Pro Patria | 1–3 | 0–0 | 1–1 | | 1–1 | 2–0 |
| Sampierdarenese | 1–1 | 3–1 | 2–0 | 0–0 | | 2–1 |
| Vigevanesi | 2–0 | 0–1 | 2–0 | 2–0 | 0–2 | |

Updated to match(es) played on unknown. Source: Almanacco Illustrato del Calcio - La Storia 1898-2004, Panini Edizioni, Modena, September 2005 (in Italian)
Legend: Blue = home team win; Yellow = draw; Red = away team win.

=== Promotion tie-breaker ===
Played on June 13 in Bologna

| Team 1 | Score | Team 2 |
|---|---|---|
| Sampierdarenese | 1-0 | Bari |

S.G. Sampierdarenese were promoted to Serie A.

== References and sources ==
- Almanacco Illustrato del Calcio - La Storia 1898-2004, Panini Edizioni, Modena, September 2005
- https://web.archive.org/web/20150104054708/http://web.tiscali.it/messinastory/indicecampionato/tabelle/cam193334.htm
