= US Adriese =

Italian football club

Adriese
- Full name: Unione Sportiva Dilettantistica Adriese 1906
- Founded: 1906
- Ground: Stadio Luigi Bettinazzi, Adria, Italy
- Capacity: 2.200
- Chairman: Luciano Scantamburlo
- Manager: Roberto Vecchiato
- League: Serie D/C
- 2018–19: 2nd
Home colours	Away colours

Unione Sportiva Dilettantistica Adriese 1906 is an Italian association football club, based in Adria, Veneto. The club was founded in 1906. Adriese currently plays in Serie D. The team's colors are dark red and blue. They played home games at the Stadio Luigi Bettinazzi stadium.
