= US 1913 Seregno Calcio =

Italian football club

Seregno
- Full name: Unione Sportiva Dilettantistica 1913 Seregno Calcio
- Founded: 1913; 112 years ago
- Ground: Stadio Ferruccio, Seregno, Italy
- Capacity: 3,700
- Chairman: Giuseppe Rocco
- Manager: Carlos França
- 2022–23: Serie D Group B, 14th of 18 (excluded)
Home colours	Away colours

Unione Sportiva Dilettantistica 1913 Seregno Calcio is an Italian association football club located in Seregno, Lombardy. In July 2024 it was expelled from Serie D for financial reasons.

== History ==
Seregno was founded in 1913 by cav. Umberto Trabattoni and in 1936 gave hospitality to Italy National Team before world football competition.

They played Serie B in 1933–34 and 1933–35, and have not played at professional level since their relegation in the 1981–82 Serie C2 season.

In 2008 the club was renamed with the current name.

In the 2020–21 Serie D season, Seregno won the Girone B group and thus ensured themselves promotion to Serie C and return to the professional level of Italian football for the first time since 1982.

== Colors and badge ==
The team's color is all-blue.

== Current squad ==
As of 27 September 2022

Note: Flags indicate national team as defined under FIFA eligibility rules; some limited exceptions apply. Players may hold more than one non-FIFA nationality.

No.	Pos.	Nation	Player
1	GK	ITA	Emanuele De Bono
2	DF	ITA	Samuele Sordillo
3	DF	ITA	Federico Bardotti (on loan from Fiorentina)
4	MF	ITA	Janis Cavagna
5	DF	ITA	Giusto Priola
6	DF	ITA	Lorenzo Rusconi
7	MF	ITA	Matteo Iurato
8	MF	ITA	Alberto Pignat
9	FW	ITA	Francesco Felleca
10	MF	ITA	Luca Santonocito
11	FW	SEN	Modou Diop
12	GK	ITA	Luca Bonadeo (on loan from Lecco)
16	MF	ITA	Gian Marco Staffa

No.	Pos.	Nation	Player
17	MF	ITA	Paquale Izzi
19	FW	ESP	Mohamed Mballo
20	MF	ITA	Filippo Calabrò
21	FW	ITA	Alessio Bartolotta
22	GK	ITA	Matteo Sala
23	DF	ITA	Cristiano Bigolin
27	FW	ALB	Klement Lleshaj
29	DF	ITA	Edoardo Zangrillo
30	FW	BEL	Gabriel Henin
31	DF	ROU	Gabriele Boloca
77	FW	ITA	Emanuele Pozzoli
93	DF	ITA	Gabriele Catterina (on loan from Genoa)
—	FW	ITA	Christian Silenzi
