= GS Bagnolese ASD =

Italian association football club

Bagnolese
- Full name: Gruppo Sportivo Bagnolese Associazione Sportiva Dilettantistica
- Founded: 1914
- Ground: Stadio Fratelli Campari, Bagnolo in Piano, Italy
- Capacity: 1,000
- Owner: Isacco Manfredini
- Chairman: Aniceto Caffarri
- Manager: Mathew Olorunleke
- League: Promozione
- 2012–13: Serie D/D, 17th
Home colours	Away colours

Gruppo Sportivo Bagnolese Associazione Sportiva Dilettantistica is an Italian association football club located in Bagnolo in Piano, Emilia-Romagna. It currently plays in Promozione.

== History ==
Founded in 1914, Bagnolese spent its early years playing in regional leagues of Emilia-Romagna. In the 2009–10 season, the club finally secured its first promotion to Serie D, the fourth tier of professional football in Italy after 96 years of play in the lower divisions. Since 2010, Bagnolese has competed in Serie D.

== Honours ==
- Eccellenza Emilia-Romagna: 4

Winners: 1998–99 (group A), 2002–03 (group A), 2009–10 (group A), 2019–20 (group A)
