= ASD Civitavecchia 1920 =

Italian football club

Civitavecchia
- Full name: Associazione Sportiva Dilettantistica Civitavecchia 1920
- Founded: 1920; 2005 (refounded)
- Ground: Stadio Giovanni Maria Fattori, Civitavecchia, Italy
- Capacity: 3,000
- Chairman: Adriano Clemeno
- Manager: Raffaele Graziano
- League: Eccellenza Lazio
- 2012–13: Serie D/G, 17th
Home colours	Away colours

Associazione Sportiva Dilettantistica Civitavecchia 1920 is an Italian association football club located in Civitavecchia, Lazio. It currently plays in Eccellenza Lazio.

== History ==
It was founded on 1920 as Società Sportiva Civitavecchiese.

=== A.S.D. Civitavecchia 1920 ===
The historical local club folded in 2005, and restarted again from Terza Categoria, the bottom of the Italian league, with the current name.

On 2007 the club bought the sports title of Unione Sportiva Civitavecchiese, just relegated to Eccellenza Lazio from Serie D, managing to reach promotion to Serie D in their first season.

In 2010–11 season the team played in Eccellenza Lazio A ranking 2nd, but on 5 August 2011 it was admitted to Serie D to fill vacancies.

== Colors and badge ==
The club's colors are black and blue.
