= US Imperia 1923 =

Italian football club

Imperia
- Full name: U.S. Imperia 1923 S.r.l.
- Founded: 1923; 2000 (U.S. Imperia 1923)
- Dissolved: 2000 (Imperia Calcio); 2008 (U.S. Imperia 1923)
- Ground: Imperia, Italy

U.S. Imperia 1923 S.r.l. was an Italian football club based in Imperia, Liguria. A.S.D. Imperia, based on the same city, being the major team of Imperia since 2008.

== History ==
U.S. Imperia 1923 had covered 85 years of the football from the club . It was a professional Italian football club, founded in 1923 as Unione Sportiva Imperia and refounded in 1987 as A.S. Imperia '87 In 2000 Imperia Calcio was bankrupted, which U.S. Imperia 1923 acquired the sports title from the administrator in 2000. In 2007–08 Serie D the club was bankrupted again, which a minor team from the same province, Pro Imperia, became the main football team of the city.

In November 2017, the prosecutor had requested to jail former chairman (Italian: presidente, lit. 'president') of the board of the football club, Gianfranco Montali for a 3-year sentence. On 2 November the Court of Imperia accepted the request and sentenced Montali.

Gianfranco Montali and his son Alessandro were already banned from football activities for a year due to irregularities in club management in October 2008.

== Colors and badge ==
The team's colors were black and blue and its symbol was the dragon.

== Honours ==
- Serie D
  - Winner (1): 1998–99
- Eccellenza
  - Winner (1): 2005–06
- Regional Coppa Italia Liguria:
  - Winners (1): 2005–06
