= US Russi =

Italian football club

- Full name: Unione Sportiva Russi Srl
- Founded: 1925
- Ground: Stadio Bruno Bucci, Russi, Italy
- Capacity: 2,500
- Chairman: Lino Dalla Valle
- Manager: Giuseppe Lorenzo
- League: Eccellenza Emilia-Romagna
- 2010–11: Serie D/D, 17th (relegated)
Home colours	Away colours

Unione Sportiva Russi is an Italian association football club located in Russi, Emilia-Romagna.

In the season 2010–11, from Serie D group D relegated to Eccellenza Emilia-Romagna.

== Colors and badge ==
Its colors are orange and black.
