= FC Lamezia Terme =

Italian football club

- Full name: F.C. Lamezia Terme
- Nickname(s): Gialloblù
- Founded: 2021
- Dissolved: 2023
- Ground: Stadio Guido D'Ippolito; Lamezia Terme, Italy
- Capacity: 5,842
- Owner: Felice Saladini
- Chairman: Massimo Amendola
| Home colours | Away colours |

F.C. Lamezia Terme was an Italian association football club based in Lamezia Terme, Calabria.

== History ==
On 27 July 2021, Lamezia-based entrepreneur Felice Saladini announced the birth of a new football team: F.C. Lamezia Terme. Saladini hoped to unite fans of the other teams in Lamezia Terme, Vigor Lamezia and ASD Sambiase, who both decided to start over from the Prima Categoria amateur league, with the intention to have those fans support a common cause.

They played their inaugural season in 2021–22 Serie D Group I placing at 4th place and losing playoff semifinal against Acireale.

Lamezia Terme reached again the 4th place in 2022-23 Serie D Group I losing play-off semifinal against Trapani. Another important result reached during that season was the semifinal of Serie D Italian Cup.

In 2023, FC Lamezia Terme announces their withdraw from the championship of Serie D 2023–2024.

== Colors and badge ==
The team's colors were blue and yellow. Their motto was "Vis Unita Fortior," which translates to "unity is strength" and was displayed on the badge.
