= SSD Nissa FC =

Italian football club

Nissa
- Full name: Società Sportiva Dilettantistica; Nissa Football Club
- Founded: 1962; 1937; 2014 (refounded)
- Ground: Stadio Palmintelli, Caltanissetta, Italy
- Capacity: 4,000
- Chairman: Luca Giovannone
- Manager: Nicola Terranova
- League: Serie D
- 2024–25: 6th
Home colours	Away colours

Società Sportiva Dilettantistica Nissa Football Club, commonly known as Nissa, is an Italian association football club, based in Caltanissetta, Sicily, that plays in Serie D.

== History ==
=== Foundation ===
The club was founded in 1962, as heir of former local club Unione Sportiva Nissena, who lived from 1947 to 1962 and assumed the original denomination of Nissa Sport Club 1962.

Former crest of Nissa FC.

=== Serie D ===
Nissa played in a minor amateur league before reaching Serie D in 1967, where it spent five seasons before relegating in 1972. It returned to play Serie D only in 1979, later starting plans for a historical entry into Italian professional football. Nissa were however relegated in 1983, only to be readmitted to fill a league vacancy; it consequently decided to take advantage of the opportunity and build a strong team that promptly won the 1984 Serie D league, and finally ensuring promotion to Serie C2.

=== Serie C2 ===
Nissa's debut as a professional team came in a Coppa Italia Serie C match against Reggina, which ended in a 2–2 home tie. In its first Serie C2 season, it barely escaped relegation by winning the four final matches. The following campaign was far more successful, as Nissa achieved a good sixth place in the final place. However, Nissa's time in professional football came to an end in 1987, as it was relegated back to Interregionale. This was followed by a financial crisis that caused a relegation to Promozione in 1989; the club promptly returned to Interregionale the following season, but only to be cancelled from football due to bankruptcy in 1992. A minor Promozione club, Caltanissetta, was consequently admitted to Eccellenza under the denomination of Nuova Nissa, being promoted to Serie D in 1995. However, this club folded three years later, in 1998, due to financial issues.

=== The refoundation ===
After a year without a major football team in Caltanissetta, minor clubs Sommatino and Nissena 1996 merged to found the current club in 1999, thus gaining the right to play Promozione and immediately winning promotion to Eccellenza. In the following years, Nissa fought hard to go on its rise into the football pyramid, without succeeding in it until 2008, when it won the Girone A of Eccellenza Sicily after a long battle with Trapani.

=== Liquidation, another refoundation and return to Serie D ===
In the summer of 2013, the club could not enter 2013–14 Eccellenza after the relegation and was so subsequently liquidated. In 2014, however, it restarted in Prima Categoria Sicily under the current name.

In 2024, Nissa were crowned Eccellenza Sicily champions, thus winning promotion to Serie D.

== Colors and badge ==
Its official colours are red and yellow.

== Stadium ==
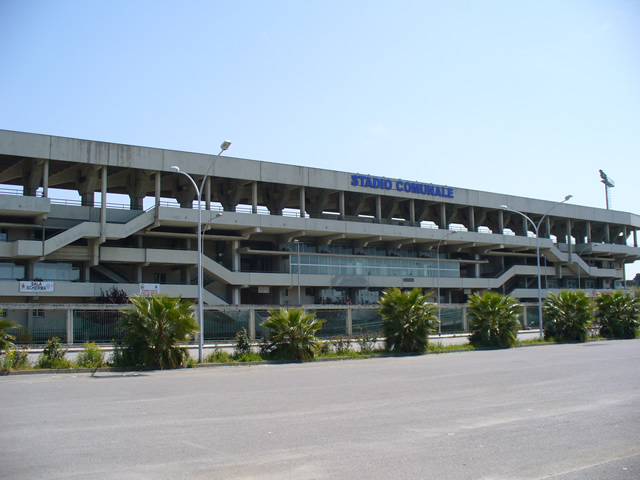
Stadio Marco Tomaselli (Pian del Lago), Nissa's home venue until 2013

Nissa plays their home matches at Stadio Marco Tomaselli, informally known as Pian del Lago, with a capacity of 11,950. This venue also hosted an Italy national under-21 football team match in 1994, which ended in a 2–1 win for the azzurrini against Croatia national under-21 football team, but is best remembered for seeing the Italian team play with Nissa's red-coloured home shirts due to both teams having very similar jersey colours and lacking the corresponding reserve kits.

Nissa played their home games between 2013 and 2022 at Stadio Palmintelli, the second-largest stadium in Caltanissetta.
