= Relocation of professional sports teams in Europe =

Relocation of professional sports teams occurs when a team owner moves a team, generally from one metropolitan area to another, but occasionally between municipalities in the same conurbation.

In Europe, moves are very rare because of the different relationship between clubs and their league in the European system of professional sports league organization. The practice is considered anathema. In most European sports, teams can be relegated from their current league to a lower one or promoted to the one above.

== Armenia ==
- FC Banants were founded in 1992 in the village of Kotayk, representing the Kotayk Province. Between 1992 and 1995, the club was commonly referred to as Banants Kotayk. During the 1992 season, the club won the first Armenian Cup. At the end of the 1995 transitional season, Banants suffered a financial crisis. The club owners decided that it was better to merge the club with FC Kotayk of Abovyan, rather than disband it. In 2001, Banants demerged from FC Kotayk, and was moved from Abovyan to the capital Yerevan.
- FC Alashkert was founded in 1990 in the town of Martuni of Gegharkunik Province. In 1992, the team played in the Premier League representing Martuni and using the City Stadium of the town as their home venue. In 1999, they did not participate in the First League competition and later in early 2000, the club was dissolved. In February 2013, the club purchased the Nairi Stadium in Yerevan, to become the official venue of their home games. As a result, the club was officially moved from Martuni to Yerevan starting from the 2013–14 season.

== Austria ==
- ASKÖ Pasching in 2007 moved from Pasching to Klagenfurt and became SK Austria Kärnten, effectively a new club to play in the Austrian Football Bundesliga. In Pasching, FC Pasching was founded immediately after the move, while SK Austria in Klagenfurt took over the former name of rivalling FC Kärnten as well as several notable players and sponsors' funds. In June 2010, SK Austria announced it was filing for bankruptcy and the city of Klagenfurt founded a new club, SK Austria Klagenfurt (FC Kärnten's historical name).
- Sportklub Admira moved from Jedlesee, Vienna, to Maria Enzersdorf in 1967. Their main sponsor, who was located in Maria Enzersdorf, requested the club to relocate and built a new stadium for them there.

== Azerbaijan ==
- Olimpik Baku was founded on the basis of a futsal team in 2004. In 2009, the club moved from central Baku to Şüvəlan and was renamed Olimpik-Shuvalan PFC. The club once again was renamed in 2010, this time to AZAL PFC due to sponsorship reasons from the airline company Azerbaijan Airlines. In September 2010, the club management announced the construction of new AZAL Arena in Şüvəlan.
- Qarabağ FK is a football club from Aghdam, but has been based in Baku since 1993 due to the First Nagorno-Karabakh War.
- Shusha FK is a football club based in Baku but represents the city of Shusha, which is controlled by the self-declared Nagorno-Karabakh Republic.
- Standard Sumgayit was founded in Baku as Standard Baku. The club moved to Sumgayit on June 12, 2009, which changed also club's name accordingly.

== Belgium ==
- Football Couillet La Louvière was formed in June 2009 as the result of a merger between R.A.C.S. Couillet and R.A.A. Louviéroise. The matricule of the club is the number 94 of RACS Couillet, so technically it is a continuation of Couillet, whereas La Louvière has dissolved into Couillet, with their matricule (number 93) being lost. At the time of the merger, La Louvière played in the third tier of Belgian football and Couillet in the fourth, as a result, the new team started in the fourth tier. After the merger, the team was based in La Louvière and renamed to Football Club Couillet-La Louvière with abbreviation FCLL. However, the team moved back to Couillet in Charleroi in 2011 after third division team URS Centre moved to the center of La Louvière and changed its name to UR La Louvière Centre. As a result, the team name was changed again to Football Club Charleroi.
- RFC Liège, after its home stadium the Stade Vélodrome de Rocourt in Liège was destroyed, the club became 'homeless'. After having played during 4 years at rue Gilles Magnée, in Ans where a temporary stand was built, the RFC Liège is currently playing in Seraing at the Pairay Stadium.
- Racing Club Jette was founded in Jette, Brussels, in 1944. In 1988 the club moved to Wavre, Walloon Brabant and became Racing Jet Wavre.

== Cyprus ==
At least three clubs were forced to move due to the 1974 Turkish invasion of that country:

- Two clubs from Famagusta, Anorthosis (founded in 1911) and Nea Salamis (founded 1948), moved to Larnaca, and built new stadiums in that city.
- Doxa Katokopia, founded in Katokopia in 1954, moved to Peristerona. The club later moved again to the country's capital of Nicosia.

== Czech Republic ==
- Dukla Prague, a successful football team under the patronage of the Czech Armed Forces, originally from Prague, merged with second division side FC Portál Příbram in 1996. The new club, which later became known as 1. FK Příbram, played one season in Prague at the Juliska Stadium before moving to Příbram in 1997, the last home match at Juliska being a 2–2 draw with relegated Baník Havířov on June 1, 1997, effectively meaning that the original FC Příbram, founded in 1929, moved to Prague, merged and then moved back. The club currently playing under the Dukla Prague name, and the current spiritual successor of the original team, FK Dukla Prague, was founded in 1958 as FK Dukla Dejvice and advanced to the Prague Championship in the 1983–84 season. Prior to 2001, the club's best finish in a season had been second in the Prague Championship in the 1984–85 season. In 2001, the club became known as FK Dukla Prague, but not the legal successor of the original Dukla Prague team. In November 2006, the new FK Dukla Prague management announced that it had agreed to a takeover of second league rights of the Jakubčovice team and in 2007 Dukla took Jakubčovice's place in the Czech 2. Liga, having finished the 2006–07 season in second place.
- In ice hockey, the Kontinental Hockey League, based in Russia but also including teams from several other post-Soviet states, expanded outside the former Soviet Union for the first time in 2011, adding the Slovakian team Lev Poprad. The team was purchased by Czech interests after the 2011–12 season; the new owners folded the club and replaced it with a similarly named team, the Prague-based Lev Praha. Although the two Lev teams are technically separate corporate entities, this situation can effectively be viewed as a move; not only are the team names similar, but the new owners retained much of the Poprad roster.
- Mountfield HK originated with a club that began playing ice hockey in České Budějovice in 1928. Following the 2012–13 season, the Czech Extraliga reached a sponsorship deal with Radegast to sell its beer in all Extraliga arenas. This agreement conflicted with the naming rights deal HC České Budějovice already had with Budweiser Budvar Brewery for their arena. Under the agreement, the club and the city would face stiff penalties for selling any beer other than Budvar products. Unable to resolve the dispute, the club decided on June 18, 2013, that no agreement could be reached between the parties involved and voted to immediately move to Hradec Králové for the 2013–14 season. The ice hockey traditions of HC České Budějovice was continued in the town by a club which adopted the historical club name "Motor" – ČEZ Motor České Budějovice
- Basketball club Nymburk relocated to Prague and changed its name to Slavia Praha NBK.

== Estonia ==
- JK Tervis Pärnu moved in 1996 and played its home games in Lelle, small borough in Kehtna Parish, becoming Lelle SK. At the end of 2002 the club moved back to Pärnu and reinstated its original name.
- KSK Vigri Tallinn moved from Tallinn to Maardu, becoming FK Maardu.
- Lantana Tallinn moved in 1996 from the Kadriorg Stadium in Tallinn to the Viimsi Stadium in Viimsi.
- Levadia Maardu was founded in 1998 in Maardu. In 2004, they moved to Tallinn, and were renamed to Levadia Tallinn. The original Levadia Tallinn founded in 2000 subsequently became the moved club's reserve team, Levadia II Tallinn.

== France ==
In 1967, the top-tier but deep in-debt Toulouse FC, located in Toulouse, merged with Paris suburbs Red Star, then a tier-2 club, actually moving the entire club, including players and staff, 700 kilometres (430 mi) North. This created a major scandal, leading to legislation changes, in particular the 1984 Avice law, which prevents out-of-departement fusions or moves for all sports

- Athlétic Club Arles founded in 1913 in Arles, moved in 2010 to the nearby (45 kilometres (28 mi)) Avignon and adopted its current name, Athlétic Club Arles-Avignon
- Evian Thonon Gaillard F.C. were rumoured to be pursuing a move to play its home matches at the Stade de la Praille in Geneva, Switzerland after it was determined that the club's current facility, the Stade Joseph-Moynat, did not meet the Ligue de Football Professionnel's (LFP) standards. Thonon-les-Bains, the commune where the club situates itself, is a few kilometres from the Swiss border and is only 34.6 kilometres (21.5 mi), a 45-minute car drive, from the city of Geneva. It was reported that the club's president, Patrick Trotignon, had been in the process of advocating for the move since the beginning of the 2009–10 Championnat National season just in case the club had achieved promotion to the second division. The vice-president of Swiss club Servette FC, who occupy the stadium, questioned the move citing possible schedule conflicts, as well as the health of the pitch if both clubs were to use the stadium on a weekly basis. However, his claims were refuted by Benoît Genecand, who serves as president of Fondation du Stade de Genève (FSG), which owns and operates the facility. The club responded immediately to Genecand's comments via a press release posted on the club's official website. Evian petitioned to the State Council of Geneva and obtained approval from the LFP for the move in early May. On May 20, 2010, Evian received a favourable ruling from the French Football Federation (FFF) with the Federal Council voting in favour of the move. According to the federation, the move now had to be agreed upon by a UEFA executive committee, which is composed of seventeen officials. On June 8, UEFA officially denied Evian's request to play at the Stade de la Praille meaning the club would play its home matches at the Parc des Sports in nearby Annecy.

== Georgia ==
Due to the Abkhaz–Georgian conflict several clubs from the region cannot compete in the Georgian league and therefore several clubs have been re-founded by internally displaced persons from Abkhazia in Tbilisi, and although the original clubs continue to exist in exile, and no actual move has occurred, the Abkhaz peoples who had founded these club consider the clubs to be the continuation of the original club:

- Dinamo Sokhumi continues to exist however two phoenix clubs have been found. FC ASMC Sokhumi was first founded as Dinamo Sokhumi and continues to represent the city in Tbilisi. FC Tskhumi Sokhumi was formed to represent Sokhumi initially in 1990, due to FC Dinamo Sokhumi refusing to join Umaglesi Liga and played in the Soviet First League, when the vast majority of the Georgian clubs withdrew from the Soviet League system and joined the Georgian SSR regional league, as the first Umaglesi Liga. After bankruptcy in 1993, the club was re-founded in 1999.
- FC Gagra was founded in 2004 as a continuation of the city of Gagra's disrupted by war football traditions, although a dormant amateur side in Gagra by the same name remains in the local Abkhaz league. Initially there have been efforts to move the Abkhaz team to Tskaltubo, ground-sharing with Samgurali Tskaltubo due to the number of internally displaced persons in the town but these plans failed due to lack of finances and facilities.

Due to the Georgian–Ossetian conflict, several teams have been displaced:

- Spartaki Tskhinvali originally from the South Ossetian capital Tskhinvali currently play their league matches in either Gori or Tbilisi.

== Germany ==
While football club moves have so far been unusual in West German football, it was a rather common practice in communist East Germany. As teams were dependent on the regime, it intervened several times to promote an equal distribution of teams across the country. A number of prominent East German teams were affected by these political moves, and even in modern-day Germany, the reason for the regional dominance of some teams and the roots of many strong rivalries can be found there.

Major moves in the DDR-Oberliga:

- In 1954, the entire team of Empor Lauter, a club from a small industrial town in southern Saxony, moved to the very north of the country to compete as Empor Rostock. Under the name Hansa Rostock, they have been the most successful East German team since 1990.
- Also in 1954, Dynamo Dresden lost all its players to the newly formed side of Dynamo Berlin. Dresden passed almost a decade in the lower leagues, returned to top-level football in 1962 and became one of the fiercest rivals of by-then record champion Dynamo Berlin.
- Vorwärts Frankfurt (Oder) was the only major team to move twice. Founded as Vorwärts Leipzig in 1951, the team was moved to East Berlin in 1953, where they won six East German championships. They became Vorwärts Frankfurt in 1971 and were renamed to FFC Viktoria in 1991.

In recent times, team moves have become a more common feature in sports that are less popular with the German public. Notable examples include former ice hockey team München Barons (became the Hamburg Freezers in 2002), former handball side VfL Bad Schwartau (became HSV Handball in 2002) and basketball club Bayer Giants Leverkusen (Düsseldorf Giants since 2008).

== Greece ==
- Apollon Smyrnis and Panionios were founded in 1891 and 1890 respectively in Smyrna (today İzmir) but moved to Athens in 1922 after the Greco-Turkish War in 1921 and the subsequent expulsion of Greeks from Turkey. In 1938 Panionios moved from Athens to the suburb of New Smyrna.

== Hungary ==
Until the mid-2000s, moving and renaming smaller teams was a common method for larger teams in Hungary to evade their financial crisis or to level up in the league system without winning promotion on-pitch, a method that became so popular and controversial it had to be prohibited.

- Diósgyőri VTK from Miskolc, then named Diósgyőr FC went into bankruptcy after the 1999–2000 NB1 season. After immediately forming a fan-owned club in the seventh tier of the Hungarian league system, during the winter the club took over fellow Miskolc team Borsod Volán SE to gain promotion to the third division. After years of third and second league football, the team gained promotion in 2004 on-pitch, but failed to obtain license for the 2004–05 NB1 season. Therefore, the club took over Balaton FC, a team from Siófok with financial problems, and took up the name Diósgyőri Balaton FC. After having two teams with two different coaches during the summer pre-season – one that gained promotion and one that got moved to Miskolc with the proper licensing -, and even being excluded from the league for a brief period, the team regained its original name DVTK and cemented itself in the highest tier of Hungarian football once more.
- BFC Siófok, which had its predecessor Balaton FC moved to Miskolc in 2004, bought the team of Bodajk playing in the second tier next year, and renamed itself to Bodajk FC Siófok.
- Vasas SC from Angyalföld, 13th district, Budapest: the six-time championship winner team, which already faced financial difficulties over the millennium, was relegated in the 2001–02 season after finishing third in the season before. In the second league, matters became worse, and the new owner János Jámbor moved fellow second division team Kecskeméti TE to the capital and transforming it to the club's football team instead of saving the original.
- Lombard Pápa: Péter Bíró, owner of jewelry trader firm Lombard, was a long-time football investor, having been the owner of Tatabánya FC and Szombathelyi Haladás, both carrying the Lombard name during his reign respectively. In 2004, he decided to move his team to Pápa, which meant that the team, never been playing in the first league before, took hold of the first league license of Szombathely.
- Szombathelyi Haladás, in the same vein as its first league license got transferred to Pápa, had bought Dabas and took hold its second league license just days after its demise.

== Italy ==
=== Association football ===
Current Italian football laws allow clubs to move only between bordering cities, although there have been some exceptions. Some examples include:

- F.C. Südtirol was founded in Brixen as Sport Verein Milland in 1974. In 1995, after unsuccessfully trying to buy A.C. Bolzano of Bolzano (a club in financial difficulties that filed for bankruptcy shortly after and was refounded as F.C. Bolzano 1996), new owners bought Milland and renamed it Football Club Südtirol-Alto Adige, changing their colors from yellow and black to red and white (the colours of both South Tyrol and Bolzano). The club quickly won promotions, reaching Serie D in 1997 and staying at that level until 2000. After briefly moving from Brixen to Tramin an der Weinstraße in the second half of the 1999-2000 Serie D season, due to problems with the Brixen stadium management, the club won promotion to the professional Serie C2 at the end of that campaign. Due to the fact that the only stadium in South Tyrol suitable to host professional matches being Stadio Druso in Bolzano, the club moved there to play their home matches and dropped the Italian part in their name, shortening and "Germanizing" it to Fussball Club Südtirol. The team ownership immediately also tried to move the registered office of the club to the South Tyrol capital, but this was contrasted by the Italian Football Federation until 2011 (causing the club to continuously move from Brixen to Bolzano and vice versa also during the same season; the games in Brixen were played without any supporters in the stands because of the unsuitability of its facility). The club reached the third level of the Italian professional football at the end of the 2010 season and it was promoted in Serie B for the first time in 2022.
- U.C. AlbinoLeffe was founded in 1998 after the merger of Albinese Calcio of Albino and Società Calcio Leffe of Leffe, two clubs hailing from two small towns closed to each other in the Val Seriana, in the province of Bergamo; at the time of the merger, both sides were playing in Serie C2. AlbinoLeffe took home in Stadio Carlo Martinelli of Leffe. The newborn team immediately won promotion to Serie C1, and, at the end of the 2002–03 season, also reached Serie B for the first time. This forced the light-blues to move to the Stadio Atleti Azzurri d'Italia of Bergamo to play their home matches, because the stadium of Leffe was too small to host Serie B games (the youth teams kept on using the Stadio Martinelli, though). AlbinoLeffe spent 9 consecutive years in the second division and during this period it moved its legal headquarters to Bergamo without much fuss and also built a training center in Zanica, a town south of Bergamo and several kilometers away from the Val Seriana, while still nominally representing Albino and Leffe. The club exploited the Bergamo stadium until 2019, when it was pushed out by Atalanta B.C., the main team in Bergamo, that in the meantime had bought the Stadio Atleti Azzurri d'Italia and started to rebuild it. This forced the Val Seriana club to move again to another sports facility, the Stadio Città di Gorgonzola in Gorgonzola, in the province of Milan, while they were building a stadium owned by them inside their training centre: the new stadium, named AlbinoLeffe Stadium, opened in 2021.
- In 2003, after Cosenza Calcio 1914 was not admitted to Serie B, a new ownership bought the sports rights from then-Serie D club Castrovillari to let a Cosenza franchise to play football in the upcoming season. The new club, however, proved to be short-lived, as it declared bankruptcy in 2007, but was promptly replaced by Fortitudo Cosenza, born as a move of neighbouring Serie D club Rende Calcio.
- F.C. Neapolis was born as a move of Sangiuseppese, a club hailing from the neighbouring city of San Giuseppe Vesuviano, to Naples. The club, in search for a fanbase and constantly overshadowed by S.S.C. Napoli's presence, moved (or attempted to move) to several towns and cities in the Gulf area, first to Mugnano di Napoli, and later to Frattamaggiore and Torre del Greco, before coming back to Mugnano di Napoli, often slightly modifying their denomination consequently, adding a reference to a previous local team or the name of the town they were playing in. The wandering club finally disbanded in 2015.
- In 1994, one year after the cancellation of Calcio Catania, Atletico Leonzio's chairman Franco Proto moved his club to Catania, renaming it Atletico Catania. The club was actually founded in Mascalucia in 1970 as Sporting Club Mascalucia and later moved to Catania as Atletico Catania before moving again to Lentini, effectively meaning that the transfer to Catania was a "moving back". Atletico Catania went on to play up to the third level, in Serie C1, losing promotion to Serie B on play-offs twice before being cancelled in 2001 because of financial difficulties also related to Calcio Catania's return into professional football and the consequent drop in attendance. The club was immediately refounded by a group of fans and has remained in the amateur levels since, while many clubs tried to continue the football tradition of Lentini, the most recent one being Sicula Leonzio (born by moving there Real Belpassese of Belpasso), that reached Serie C in 2017, but was disbanded at the end of the 2019–20 season.
- A.C.D. Città di Vittoria, born in 2007 as merger of Serie D's Comiso with minor league club Junior Vittoria (possibly a trick to allow the club to legally move from Comiso to Vittoria).
- A.S.D. Pol. Libertas Acate of Serie D are a club officially settled in Acate, which however actually plays their home matches in Modica and are recognized by both fans and the regional press as Modica's club, being frequently referred to as Libertas Acate-Modica. In fact, after a takeover bid in 2006 the club left Acate to play their home matches in Modica despite the fact they were not eligible to change the "legal" home city.
- S.S. Racing Club Roma, playing in Rome, was founded in 2013 as A.S.D. Lupa Castelli Romani in the town of Frascati. Lupa Castelli Romani was founded in summer 2013 after A.S.D. Real T.B.M. Zagarolo transferred the seat and its sports title of Eccellenza from Zagarolo to Frascati (meanwhile, Lupa Frascasti moved out of Frascati to Rome and changed its name to Lupa Roma, see below). After gaining promotion to Lega Pro in 2015, Lupa Castelli Romani was forced to play its home games in Rieti and also tried to make the move permanent, by taking the place of local Serie D team F.C. Rieti unsuccessfully, even changing its colors from red and yellow to claret and sky blue, the colors of F.C. Rieti. After only one season, the club was relegated to Serie D and was bought by Antonio Penzone, the owner of Racing Club Ardea, a team based in Ardea playing in Eccellenza at the time. The new owner renamed the club Racing Club Roma and moved it to the Italian capital city, while retiring the first team of Racing Club Ardea, but not its youth system. The club immediately benefited from a repechage in Lega Pro, but was again relegated after a single season, ending at the bottom of its group. In 2017, Penzone bought Fondi Calcio, renaming it Racing Club Fondi, while retiring Racing Club Roma. After a single year, Penzone sold the rights to take part to Serie D to F.C. Aprilia (that was consequently renamed Aprilia Racing Club) and concentrated only to the youth teams of Racing Club Ardea.
- Lupa Frascati was founded in 1974 after the merger of Associazione Sportiva Frascati of Frascati and OMI Roma of Rome, taking the place of OMI in Serie D, while playing in Frascati, effectively meaning that the first team of the Roman club was moving to the town of Frascati. The new club gained promotion in Serie C2 at the end of 1977–78 season. In 1980 the club was relegated back in Serie D and sold its sports rights to another club based in the city of Rome, Romulea, while it restarted from the amateur levels as SIRS Frascati. After several name and property changes, it took back the Lupa Frascati moniker in 2006. In the season 2013–14 the club moved to the Axa district of Rome changing its name to A.S.D. Lupa Roma, and playing the home matches in nearby Stadio Pietro Desideri of Fiumicino (in the meanwhile A.S.D. Real T.B.M. Zagarolo of Zagarolo moved to Frascati ad took the name of Lupa Castelli Romani, see above). In the following season it was promoted to Lega Pro as group G champions, changing its name again to Lupa Roma F.C. as a sign of return to the professional ranks after a 34-season absence. The team had also to move its home to Aprilia due to the Fiumicino field being unfit for professional league games, and the immediate lack of an available venue in Rome. In 2016–17 season the club moved its home games to Stadio Olindo Galli of Tivoli, also moving its legal address there. At the end of 2019 season, the club disbanded all its teams.
- A.S.D. Maccarese Calcio was relocated and renamed as A.S.D. Trastevere Calcio in 2013.
- In 2014 A.S.D. Trastevere Calcio were promoted through relocation again, which saw the relocation of A.P.D. Ciampino from Ciampino to Trastevere, as well as the renaming of the first, founded in 2013 Trastevere as A.S.D. Guardia di Finanza Calcio, a namesake of Guardia di Finanza. That club became A.S. Grifone Gialloverde in 2016. Ciampino also headquartered another team, Pol. Città di Ciampino.
- Guidonia Montecelio 1937 FC, based in Guidonia Montecelio, was founded in the town of Monterosi in 1968 as S.S. Monterosi. In 2021, Monterosi reached a professional championship for the first time and changed their denomination to Monterosi Tuscia F.C.. Due to the fact that their home stadium, Stadio Marcello Martoni in Monterosi, was not suitable to host professional matches, the club opted to move to Viterbo's Stadio Enrico Rocchi, but, after only one season, US Viterbese 1908, the main team in Viterbo and also tenant of the stadium, decided to evict them. In the meanwhile, the club tried to renovate Monterosi's stadium, but bureaucratic problems prevented them to do so, so they moved first to Stadio Ettore Mannucci in Pontedera (about 300 km away from Monterosi) and later to Stadio Gaetano Bonolis in Teramo (some 200 km from their hometown). Finally, in 2023, Monterosi Tuscia decided to severe all the ties with their town of origin and moved their headquarters to the city of Guidonia Montecelio and to the local Stadio Comunale, changing their denomination to the current one accordingly.

=== Basketball ===
- Before the 2010–11 season, Triboldi were legally domiciled in Soresina, but played their home games in nearby Cremona, a community in the same Province. The club has now changed its domicile to Cremona.
- Nuova Sebastiani Basket moved from Rieti, a city in the Lazio region near Rome, to the southern city of Naples effective with the 2009–10 season.
- Basketball club Vanoli Cremona moved to the Rome in 2026, to create new club that is planning to participate in the 2027-28 NBA Europe League.

== Ireland ==
Irish clubs moving out of their original district are slightly more common. In certain cases, the club has moved within a conurbation.

- Shamrock Rovers Played in Glenmalure Park on the Southside of Dublin from 1926 to 1987. The club's owner Louis Kilcoyne announced he was selling Glenmalure Park, which they had recently purchased from the Jesuits. The team played the entire 1987–88 season in an almost empty Tolka Park on Dublin's Northside as a result of a boycott called for by the Shamrock Rovers Supporters Club and KRAM (Keep Rovers at Milltown), which was observed by the vast majority of Hoops fans. Following the completion of the boycott season in Tolka, the Kilcoynes sold the football club to Dublin businessman, John McNamara, who put forward a controversial proposal to move in with rivals Bohemians at Dalymount Park. KRAM congregated to vote on whether to lift the boycott and on the proposal to move to Dalymount. Both motions were passed and the club spent the next two seasons at the Phibsboro venue, with an unrecognisable side playing in front of small attendances. Rovers spent two season's in Dalymount Park before moving to the RDS Arena in Ballsbridge, just two miles away from Glenmalure Park. In 1996, the club's new owner Alan McGrath unveiled a plan to build a permanent home state-of-the-art stadium in the Dublin southwest suburb of Tallaght for Rovers, the club also played home matches in Morton Stadium, Richmond Park and again in Tolka Park before moving to their new home in Tallaght in 2009.
- Shelbourne were originally from Ringsend in the south of Dublin. The club played in Harold's Cross Stadium in Harold's Cross briefly in the 1970s before moving to the stadium in 1982 where they remained until 1989 when they moved to Tolka Park, in the north of Dublin.

== Kazakhstan ==
- Founded in 1958, Torpedo Kokshetau, was in 1997 renamed Avtomobilist Shortandy and moved to Shortandy, an Astana suburb. In 1998, it was renamed Khimik Stepnogorsk and moved to Stepnogorsk. After another renaming in 1999 to FK Akmola, the club moved back to the Torpedo Stadium in Kokshetau a year later. The club competes as FC Okzhetpes since 2004.
- Energetik Pavlodar until 2008 represented Pavlodar. In 2008 the team moved to Ekibastuz and played as Energetik-2 Ekibastuz. In 2009 it was renamed to Ekibastuz FK.

== Latvia ==
- FK Jūrmala, founded in 2003, moved from Jūrmala to Riga in March 2012 and renamed themselves after the historic Riga club, becoming FK Daugava.
- RAF Jelgava in the early 1990s RAF was one of the strongest teams in Virslīga. However, when the plant ran into financial difficulties, the team received new sponsorship from the University of Latvia in 1996 and, as a result, changed their name and moved to Riga, and played in the Latvian University Stadium. The move was a sporting disaster and the club folded. A team under the name RAF Jelgava appeared again in 2001 in the 1. līga, and after the 2003 season the club merged with another Jelgava club, FK Viola Jelgava forming FK Jelgava.

== Lithuania ==
- FK Kareda Šiauliai was a team from the city of Kaunas, founded in 1935, which moved from Šiauliai to Kaunas in 2000 becoming FK Kareda Kaunas. The club was dissolved in 2003.
- KSS Klaipėda was founded in 1926 and was the most successful pre-World War II club in Lithuania. Until spring of 1939 the club played in Klaipėda, but after the 1939 German ultimatum to Lithuania it was forced to move to Telšiai, also sometimes it played in Plungė. It was dissolved in 1940.
- FK Trakai, until February 21, 2019, was based in Trakai, when they moved to the LFF Stadium in Vilnius and were renamed FK Riteriai.

== Moldova ==
- FC Tiraspol was founded in Chișinău in 1992 as Constructorul Chișinău. Before the 2001–02 season, the club moved to Cioburciu, Transnistria, a small village outside Tiraspol, and was renamed Constructorul Cioburciu before moving to Tiraspol, the capital of the breakaway republic of Transnistria, a year later and adopting the current name in 2002.
- FC Veris, founded in Drăgănești, Sîngerei District, moved to Chișinău.

== Netherlands ==
Team moves are very rare in the Netherlands. The most prominent case involves professional football club Almere City FC. When 1964 Eredivisie champion and 1964–65 European Cup quarter finalist DWS was merged into FC Amsterdam, its supporters founded amateur football club De Zwarte Schapen, named after their nickname, which translates as Black Sheep. The club quickly rose through the ranks of amateur football, eventually reaching the Hoofdklasse. After several violent incidents on the pitch and a six-month suspension by the Royal Dutch Football Association, the club moved from Amsterdam to nearby Almere (a "new town") and changed its name to Sporting Flevoland. That name was changed to FC Omniworld in the 1990s, and FC Omniworld was admitted to the Eerste Divisie for the 2005–06 season.

Team moves are slightly more common in other sports in the Netherlands. Volleyball club AMVJ, for instance, moved from Amsterdam to Amstelveen in 1980. The men's team was subsequently moved to Almere in 1999, becoming VC Omniworld, the volleyball branch of the aforementioned FC Omniworld.

== Norway ==
The most notable example is the 1996 move of the ice hockey team Spektrum Flyers from Oslo to Bergen.

Otherwise, team moves are rare, although mergers, for instance of teams of neighboring settlements, are common. Moving has sometimes happened on the top level of women's football. SK Sprint-Jeløy was moved from Jeløy to Moss under the new name FK Athene Moss. Asker Fotball's women's team was absorbed by Stabæk Fotball ahead of the 2009 season. Ahead of the 2010 season Team Strømmen FK (which formerly had been moved from Aurskog-Høland) was absorbed by Lillestrøm SK, and Gjøvik FK absorbed by Raufoss IL.

== Poland ==
=== Association football ===
- Olimpia Poznań was moved from Poznań and merged with Lechia Gdańsk in 1995 creating Olimpia-Lechia Gdańsk. It only lasted one season in the top division and by 1997 it was already in the third division. The club tried to rescue its fall through another merger with local club Polonia Gdańsk, in turn dropping Olimpia's heritage and changing its name to Lechia-Polonia Gdańsk, with Antoni Ptak's company as the main sponsor. In 2001 Lechia decided to leave the merger, and started as an independent club from the bottom of the football pyramid as the sole legal and spiritual continuator of BKS Lechia, which folded the merged club in 2002, forcing Polonia to start in a lower league as well.
- Pogoń Szczecin in 2002 was on the brink of bankruptcy. As a result, fans created a new team on the basis of the reserves in the fourth division. However owner of Piotrcovia Piotrków Trybunalski Antoni Ptak decided to move the team and renamed the club MKS Pogoń Szczecin. The initial distrust was lost when the team performed well and used local players, however halfway through the 2005/2006 season the team started underperforming and Ptak decided to replace almost the entire squad with only Brazilian nationals, making it the "most Brazilian team outside Brazil". Antoni Ptak also built a small training facility in Gutów Mały, meaning the home games were played almost 500 kilometres (310 mi) away from Szczecin. The experiment failed and in 2007 Antoni Ptak moved away from football, leaving the club to be rebuilt on the basis of the 4th division counterpart set up originally by the fans, which acted as the reserve team in the meantime.
- Sokół Pniewy was moved to Tychy and merged with the local club GKS Tychy, which resulted in unorthodox renaming, first to Sokół Pniewy in Tychy, then from January 9, 1996 Sokół Tychy. After 26 games in its 2nd season the new fused club folded, leaving the reserve team Sokół Pniewy in the fourth division to become its senior team, whereas GKS Tychy started anew.
- WKS Zawisza Bydgoszcz was founded in Koszalin, however a year later in 1947, being an army club, when the army offices moved to Bydgoszcz so did the team, however up until that point the team only played friendly matches.
- Zawisza Bydgoszcz SA was a club that was created when Kujawiak Włocławek were moved to Bydgoszcz and renamed by Hydrobudowa, their owners. The original WKS Zawisza Bydgoszcz continued playing in the fourth division, however the new club had a very similar logo and an identical name, resulting in an unusual situation of having two almost identical clubs playing in 2 different divisions; for the purposes disambiguation, the new merged Zawisza was called Zawisza Bydgoszcz (2) by official sources and Kujawiak/Zawisza or Hydrobudowa Bydgoszcz by many others. As a result of the merger, Kujawiak, Zawisza and supporters all over the country boycotted the moved team. The reserve team continued to play under the name Kujawiak Włocławek in the Fourth Polish league. The club folded in 2007 as a result of serious corruption allegations and widespread condemnation.

=== Other ===
- Prokom Trefl Sopot was a successful basketball team, however it moved from Sopot to Gdynia and was renamed Asseco Prokom Gdynia. A phoenix club was set up straight away in 2009 called Trefl Sopot.
- MKS Ślepsk Augustów, a men's volleyball club founded in 2004 in Augustów, moved to Suwałki in 2009 becoming MKS Ślepsk Suwałki.

== Romania ==
- Astra Ploiești was moved in September 2012 from Ploiești to Giurgiu becoming Astra Giurgiu.
- CS Buftea was founded in 2005 after a merger between a local team from Buftea, which was playing in the fourth division and Cimentul Fieni, being located only 20 km north-west of Bucharest, in the town of Buftea, Ilfov County. The club had originally a red, white and blue combination of colours and played its home matches on Orășenesc Stadium. In 2013–2016, the club moved three times. First time in 2013, the club was bought by the local authorities from Clinceni, 30 km away from Buftea, renamed as FC Clinceni and re-branded, then one year later, businessman Constantin Moroianu bought the club, moved it to Pitești, renamed it as Academica Argeș, changing its colours and logo. After another year the club was moved again to Clinceni, renamed as Academica Clinceni, changed its colours back in black and blue and also the logo. After financial problems, the club started in 2017 a collaboration with FCSB, having some young players on loan from the multiple champions of Romania.
- Damila Măciuca was founded in 2010. In the summer of 2013 after the over average performance of the team and also the ranking that was with 3 places and 10 points over CSM Râmnicu Vâlcea, county's first team, appeared the idea that Damila should be the new team of the city of Râmnicu Vâlcea. After several rounds of negotiations Daniel Nițu (Damila's owner) and Cătălin Rufă (CSM's owner) changed the camps, so Rufă became the new owner of the white and greens and also the squads were changed between them. After the transaction Rufă has received the financial support of the Reșița Municipality, with the condition that the club must change its name, headquarters, colors and stadium. So in the summer of 2013 Damila Măciuca was renamed as CSM Metalul Reșița, moved from Măciuca to Reșița, their colors were changed from white and green in red and black, the traditional colours of Reșița and the Damila Stadium has been replaced by Mircea Chivu Stadium. Though sustained at first by Guardia Rosso-Nera, CSM Școlar Reșița supporters, club that was at that time in a hard financial situation, the relationship between the owner and the supporters chilled subsequently and they went back to supporting their original club, CSM. Also in the summer of 2015 the relations between Reșița Municipality and Cătălin Rufă have become increasingly distant. In the summer of 2016 Snagov Commune was interested in supporting the team, of course there was a new move in the business, this time from Reșița to Snagov. With the financial support of Snagov Commune the club changed its name again in the summer of 2017, this time from CSM Metalul Reșița to CS Sportul Snagov and their colours were changed from red and black in red and blue. In February 2018 it was announced that Sportul will play in the second part of the championship on Dumitru Mătărău Stadium from Ștefăneștii de Jos due to the changing of the surface from Voința Stadium, a pitch with major problems in the past, in terms of quality.
- Foresta Fălticeni was founded in 1954 in Fălticeni under the name of Avântul Fălticeni. In 1997, the club was moved to Suceava after it won the promotion to the Divizia A for the first time in history. The main reason for the move was the inadequate state of Foresta's stadium in Fălticeni, which was both small and had a cracked stand. Another reason for the move was, that the main team in the city, CSM Suceava had failed to achieve any notable performances during the previous decade. Before it was dissolved in 2003 it moved back to Fălticeni to play the last matches in its history there.
- Petrolul Ploiești was founded in Bucharest in 1924. They moved to Ploiești in 1952.
- Unirea Tărlungeni in the summer of 2016 was moved from Tărlungeni to Ștefăneștii de Jos. After the move, the team faced financial problems due to non-involvement of Ștefăneștii de Jos Municipality, one of its new owners. During the winter break all the players terminated their contracts and left the team. Despite the efforts to maintain the club, Unirea Tărlungeni withdrew from Liga II in February 2017.

== Russia ==
- FC Signal Izobilny was founded in Izobilny in 1984, and after adding Kavkaztransgaz to its name in 2000, it moved to Ryzdvyany in 2005, becoming FC Kavkaztransgaz Ryzdvyany. In 2014, the club moved to Stavropol, becoming FC Dynamo GTS Stavropol, continuing the legacy of a separate FC Dynamo Stavropol.
- Lukoil Chelyabinsk moved in 2006 from Chelyabinsk to Nizhny Novgorod and became Spartak Nizhny Novgorod. The club folded in 2007 after only a year.
- FC Dynamo Saint Petersburg was founded in 1922, moved in 2018 from Saint Petersburg to Sochi, becoming PFC Sochi. Dynamo Saint Petersburg was re-established on the base FC LAZ (Luga/Saint Petersburg) in 2019, playing in amateur level.
- One current top-level basketball team has moved twice in the 2000s; a club founded in 1946 in Mineralnye Vody as Lokomotiv Mineralnye Vody, moved in 2003 to Rostov-on-Don, and then in 2008 to Krasnodar, where it is now known as Lokomotiv-Kuban. All three of the club's home cities are in adjoining federal subjects.
- BC Triumph Lyubertsy moved from Moscow to Saint Petersburg, forming BC Zenit.

== Slovakia ==
- In 2011, the Kontinental Hockey League, based in Russia but also including teams from several other post-Soviet states, expanded outside the former Soviet Union for the first time, adding the Slovakian team Lev Poprad. The team was purchased by Czech interests after the 2011–12 season; the new owners folded the club and replaced it with a similarly named team, the Prague-based Lev Praha. Although the two Lev teams are technically separate corporate entities, this situation can be viewed as an effective move; not only are the team names similar, but the new owners retained much of the Poprad roster.

== Spain ==
- RCD Espanyol, based in Sarrià Stadium within Barcelona from 1927 to 1997, moved south to Estadi Olimpic de Montjuic, and then to Estadi Cornellà-El Prat outside Barcelonès district in 2009.
- Ciudad de Murcia, a Segunda División side, at the end of the 2006–2007 season, was acquired by an investor from Granada, transferring it to that city and renaming it to Granada 74 CF. The players still under contract with Ciudad had the option to cancel their contract or stay on with the newly formed club.
- Club Balonmano Ciudad Real (the handball team of Ciudad Real), the second best team ever in handball history in Spain, and winner of the Super Globe in 2007 and 2010, could not find a sponsor and did not have enough support for maintain a high level team. Team was sold in 2011 to Club Atlético de Madrid and renamed to Club Balonmano Atlético de Madrid. Despite winning 2012 World Championship in their first year with the new owners, and other national titles, they couldn't afford debts, and team disappeared in 2013.
- Unió Esportiva Llagostera on 31 July 2021 announced the change of name to Unió Esportiva Costa Brava, moving permanently from Llagostera to the Estadi Palamós Costa Brava in the city of Palamós and changing the club's logo.

== Sweden ==
Although no major moves have occurred, two clubs from the capital Stockholm have changed municipality (AIK) and acquired another team into their club colours (Hammarby Ishockey) respectively. AIK was formed in Stockholm in 1891 but then moved to neighbouring Solna in 1937. Hammarby IF had an ice hockey section that was shut down in 2008. In 2013, the club Bajen Fans Hockey then changed their name to Hammarby Ishockey, thereby becoming one of very few clubs in Sweden that have acquired another club and made it their own. Also see AFC Eskilstuna.

== Switzerland ==
In Switzerland only one move has happened so far. The Zürich-based football club Grasshoppers Zürich under company name "Die Neue Grasshopper Fussball AG" controversially moved their headquarters in 2005 from the city itself to Niederhasli. The addition of Zurich was remained in the club's name and the team is still playing in the city of Zurich at Letzigrund (the home stadium of their old rival FC Zürich, a temporary measure while Stadion Zürich is being built). All other teams of the club are playing Niederhasli.

The fans of Grasshoppers Club protested the move, claiming the club has lost part of its identity.

== Turkey ==
- Apollon Smyrnis and Panionios were founded in 1891 and 1890 respectively in Smyrna (today İzmir) but moved to Athens in 1922 after the Greco-Turkish War in 1921 and the subsequent expulsion of Greeks from Turkey. In 1938 Panionios moved from Athens to the suburb of New Smyrna.
- Süleymaniye Sirkeci was founded in 1911 and had black-white colors. The club played in the old Third Division (now TFF Second League) before moving to Küçükçekmece at the end of the 1989–90 season. It was renamed as Küçükçekmecespor and changed its colors to green-white.
- Beyoğlu Kapalıçarşı was founded in 1983 in Beyoğlu district. The club moved to Güngören and was renamed as Güngören Belediyespor after the end of the 1993–94 season.
- Erzinspor moved Erzin to İskenderun becoming İskenderun FK in 2021.

== Ukraine ==
- Lokomotyv Donetsk was created sometime around 1957 and initially represented city of Artemivsk. After being promoted to the Soviet Class B in 1958, the club moved to Stalino (now Donetsk) in mid-season. The club existed until 1973 when it relegated from the Soviet Second League and was dissolved.
- Shakhtar Shakhtarsk in 1996 became a new club Metalurh Donetsk which became based in Donetsk, and based on the senior squad of Shakhtar. The youth squad of Shakhtar Shakhtarsk joined the youth academy of Shakhtar Donetsk, while other players who were not suited for the club formed new team Fortuna Shakhtarsk and until 1999 were playing in a town of Kontarne, now a part of the Shakhtarsk municipality.
- SKA Kyiv in 1972 the team moved to Chernihiv and changed its name to SK Chernigov but had moved back to Kyiv in 1976 as SKА Kyiv.

Due to the War in Donbass, several clubs have temporarily moved for an indefinite period of time due to safety concerns. Shakhtar Sverdlovsk and Avanhard Kramatorsk could not find alternative venues and withdrew from all competitions as a result. Those teams that moved continue to participate in all competitions:

- Illichivets Mariupol left the Illichivets Stadium in Mariupol to play at the Meteor Stadium in Dnipropetrovsk.
- Metalurh Donetsk moved from its stadium in Donetsk to play matches at the Obolon Arena in Kyiv and Arena Lviv in Lviv.
- Makiyivvuhillya Makiyivka, originally from Makiivka, Donetsk Oblast, played their home games at Kolos Sport Training Base in the village of Chkalovo in the Nikopol Raion and at Metalurh Stadium in Yenakiieve, before moving to the city of Nikopol, Dnipropetrovsk Oblast in 2014.
- Olimpik Donetsk left its home, the Sports Complex Olimpik in Donetsk, to play at the Bannikov Stadium in Kyiv.
- Shakhtar Donetsk had to move and play its home games in Arena Lviv, and Bannikov Stadium in Kyiv. Its home Donbass Arena has been destroyed in the war.
- Shakhtar-3 Donetsk play their home games at Mashynobudivnyk Stadium in Karlivka.
- Stal Alchevsk currently play at the Mashynobudivnyk Stadium, Karlivka, leaving the Stal Stadium in Alchevsk.
- Zorya Luhansk left the Avanhard Stadium in Luhansk to play at the Slavutych-Arena in Zaporizhya.
- In ice hockey, HC Donbass, originally based in Donetsk, was forced to leave the Russia-focused Kontinental Hockey League after the 2013–14 season due to the war. The club found a new venue in Druzhkivka and resumed play in the 2015–16 season in the top Ukrainian league.

Due to the 2014 Crimean Conflict initially none of the Crimean clubs, Tytan Armyansk, Tavriya Simferopol, Zhemchuzhina Yalta or FC Sevastopol were able to move due to the Annexation of Crimea by the Russian Federation, and subsequently they all disbanded or became dormant. However some have managed to re-establish themselves:

- Tavriya Simferopol was forced to cease its existence as Ukrainian club. Some of its staff and players decided to join the Russian Football Union under the new name FC TSK Simferopol. In June 2015, the Football Federation of Ukraine announced it would re-establish the club and its new home would be Kherson. On August 29, 2016, club was added to group 2 of Ukrainian Football Amateur League. The revamped club is based in Beryslav, Kherson oblast.
