= Samir Khotko =

Samir Hamidovich Khotko
- Хъоткъо Хьэмыд ыкъо Самыр; Самир Хамидович Хотко
- Born: June 27, 1968 (age 58); Izobilny, Stavropol Krai, Soviet Union
- Awards: Honored Scientist of the Republic of Adygea

Academic background
- Education: Adyghe State University

Academic work
- Discipline: Circassian history
- Institutions: Adyghe Republican Institute of Humanitarian Research

Samir Khotko (Adyghe: Хъоткъо Хьэмыд ыкъо Самыр; born June 27, 1968; Izobilny, Stavropol Krai, Soviet Union) is a Circassian historian, Doctor of Historical Sciences, and head researcher of the Department of Ethnology and Folk Art of the Adyghe Republican Institute of Humanitarian Research.

He is the author of several monographs and a large number of articles in scientific journals on the topic of the medieval history of the Circassian people, the history of the Circassian diaspora, Circassian Mamluks, Circassian-Slavic ethnocultural ties in the Middle Ages and modern times, as well as source studies. He is the compiler of collections of documents and materials on agriculture, piracy, horse breeding, and the history of individual historical regions of Circassia.

== Biography ==
In 1992, he graduated with honors from the Faculty of History of the Adyghe State University (ASU) and in the same year was hired as a researcher in the Department of Ethnology of the Adyghe Republican Institute of Humanitarian Research. At the same time, he became a degree-seeking student at the Department of National History of the Faculty of History of ASU. In 1997, he defended his dissertation for the degree of Candidate of Historical Sciences on the topic "Circassian Mamluks (13th-18th centuries)".

In July 1997, he participated in the 35th International Congress of Asian and North African Studies (ICANAS) held in Budapest (Hungary), where he presented a report on the topic "Alans in Mamluk Egypt. 13th-15th centuries". In July 2004, he took part in the 37th session of the same congress in Moscow with the report "Military labor migration of the Circassians in the Middle Ages and modern times". Also in July 2006, he participated in the 2nd North Atlantic Fiddle Convention (NAFCo) with the report "Scottish-Circassian ethnographic parallels". He is also the scriptwriter for the documentary-feature film "Circassia" (2007).

In 2017, he defended his doctoral dissertation on the topic "Genesis of the Adyghe (Circassian) ethnopolitical space in the 13th-16th centuries: Problems and prospects of research" (specialty 07.00.02 National History).

== Main bibliography ==
Dissertations

- Khotko S. Kh. (1997). Circassian Mamluks (13th-18th centuries) (Candidate of Historical Sciences dissertation). Maykop. p. 234.
- Khotko S. Kh. (2017). Genesis of the Adyghe (Circassian) ethnopolitical space in the 13th-16th centuries: Problems and prospects of research (PDF) (Doctor of Historical Sciences dissertation). Maykop. p. 595. Archived from the original (PDF) on 2018-05-17.

Monographs

- Khotko S. Kh. (1993). Circassian Mamluks. Maykop: Adyghe Book Publishing House. p. 180. ISBN 5-7608-0098-1.
- Khotko S. Kh. (1995). Circassian (Adyghe) rulers of Egypt and Syria in the 13th-18th centuries. Maykop: Adygea. p. 376.
- Khotko S. Kh. (1999). Genesis of Circassian elites in the Mamluk Sultanate and the Ottoman Empire (13th-19th centuries). Maykop: Meoty. p. 280.
- Khotko S. Kh. (2001). History of Circassia: In the Middle Ages and modern times. St. Petersburg: SPbSU. p. 552. ISBN 5-288-02975-X. (2nd ed., expanded and revised. St. Petersburg: SPbSU, 2002. 976 p.)
- Khotko S. Kh. (2001). Essays on the history of the Circassians: Ethnogenesis, antiquity, Middle Ages, modern times, contemporary period. St. Petersburg: SPbSU. p. 432. ISBN 5-288-02976-8.
- Khotko S. Kh. (2008). Civilization of Kabarda. St. Petersburg: SPbSU. p. 540. ISBN 978-5-7680-2218-1.
- Khotko S. Kh. (2015). Discovery of Circassia. Cartographic sources of the 14th-19th centuries. Maykop: Poligraf-YUG. p. 292. ISBN 978-5-7992-0829-5.
- Khotko S. Kh. (2015). Çerkeslerin (Adıgelerin) Tarihi (in Turkish). Istanbul: Apra. p. 332.
- Khotko S. Kh. (2017). Circassia: Genesis, ethnopolitical ties with the countries of Eastern Europe and the Middle East (13th-16th centuries). Maykop: Adyghe Book Publishing House. p. 544. ISBN 978-5-7608-0861-5.
- Хотко, Самир Хамидович (2021). The Abazins: Genesis, History, Ethnocultural Appearance: A Collection of Documentary and Narrative Sources (in Russian). Майкоп: ОАО "Полиграф-ЮГ". ISBN 978-5-7992-0945-2.

Brochures

- Agrba B. S., Khotko S. Kh. (2004). "Island" civilization of Circassia. Features of the historical and cultural identity of the land of the Adyghes. Maykop: Adygea. p. 48. ISBN 5-7992-0293-7.

Collections

- Old Circassian gardens. Landscape and agriculture of the North-Western Caucasus in the light of Russian sources. 1864-1914: in 2 volumes. Comp., intro. article and notes by S. Kh. Khotko. Moscow: Olma-Press. 2005. pp. 444 + 414. ISBN 5-224-05244-0.
- Circassian horse. Horse breeding and stud farming: Collection of sources. Comp., intro. article and comm. by S. Kh. Khotko. Nalchik: M. and V. Kotlyarov Publishing House ("Poligrafservis i T"). 2008. p. 424.
- Besleney - bridge of Circassia. Issues of historical demography of the Eastern Trans-Kuban region. 13th-19th centuries: Collection of documents and materials. Comp. and intro. article by S. Kh. Khotko. Maykop. 2009. p. 406. ISBN 978-5-7992-0558-4.
- Karachay - Country at the top of the Caucasus: Essays on the history and culture of Karachay (PDF). Comp., intro. article, comm. by S. Kh. Khotko. Maykop: Poligraf-Yug. 2011. p. 448. ISBN 978-5-7992-0655-0.
- Circassia in maps of the 14th-19th centuries. Comp. B. Ezbek, Kh. M. Daurov, A. V. Dzhamirze, S. Kh. Khotko; intro. article and comm. to the maps by S. Kh. Khotko. Krasnodar: AlVi-Design. 2011. p. 192.
