= AS Fiumicino 1926 =

Italian football club

Fiumicino
- Full name: Associazione Sportiva Fiumicino 1926
- Nickname: rossoblu (Red-Blue)
- Founded: 1926
- Ground: Stadio Pietro Desideri
- Capacity: 625
- League: Eccellenza Lazio Group A
- 2024–25: ?, Eccellenza Lazio
- Website: http://www.fiumicinocalcio.it

A.S. Fiumicino 1926, formerly known as Fiumicino Calcio, is an Italian football club, based in Fiumicino, a suburb of Greater Rome in the Metropolitan City of Rome Capital (formerly Province of Rome). The club participated in Serie D and Eccellenza Lazio several times, but as of 2024-25 season, participating in Eccellenza Lazio Group A. The club also affiliated to A.S. Roma as a feeder club.

== History ==
Fiumicino Calcio was founded in 1926 in Fiumicino, at that time part of Rome comune as Fiumicino (XXXVII) of Circoscrizione XIV of Rome. Fiumicino comune was created in 1992. The registration number of the club was 76,297. The club was the founding member of Eccellenza Lazio, the new 6th highest level in 1991. The club played in Promozione Lazio from 1981 to 1991, at that time the 6th highest level. Eccellenza and Promozione became the 5th and 6th level in 2014, after the disestablishment of Lega Pro Seconda Divisione.

Fiumicino won Eccellenza Lazio in 1993 and again 1996. The club played in Campionato Nazionale Dilettanti (Serie D) from 1993 to 1996 and again from 1996 to 1998. Fiumicino was relegated again in 1997–98 Campionato Nazionale Dilettanti season, with only 20 points. The club was relegated from 2005–06 Eccellenza Lazio in 2006 and again from 2011–12 Eccellenza Lazio season in 2012. Thus, in 2012–13 season, Fiumicino had derbies with namesake Città di Fiumicino. In 2012–13 Promozione Lazio season, Città di Fiumicino finished as the 8th, and Fiumicino was relegated again as the 18th. Fiumicino became a repechage to 2014–15 Promozione Lazio in September 2014 to fill the vacancy left by Monterotondo.

In 2015, Fiumicino merged with another minor club of the comune, "A.S.D. Isola Sacra 2011" (namesake of Isola Sacra). The new denomination was A.S. Fiumicino 1926, with a new registration number 943,007.

== Stadium ==
The club played their home matches in Stadio Pietro Desideri, on 2 Via Balsofiore, Fiumicino. The stadium was also used by Lupa Roma. The stadium had a capacity of 2,500.

== Honours ==
- Eccellenza Lazio
  - Winners (2): 1992–93, 1995–96

== See also ==
- Pol.D. Fregene, another team of Fiumicino comune, but from Fregene area, a predecessor of A.S.D. S.F.F. Atletico
- A.S.D. Maccarese Calcio, another team of Fiumicino comune, but from Maccarese area
- A.S.D. S.F.F. Atletico, another team of Fiumicino comune
