= Manuel Nocciolini =

Italian footballer (born 1989)

Personal information
- Date of birth: 18 May 1989 (age 37)
- Place of birth: Piombino, Italy
- Height: 1.84 m (6 ft 0 in)
- Position: Forward

Team information
- Current team: Fidentina

Youth career
- Fiorentina

Senior career*
Years	Team	Apps	(Gls)
2008–2010	Fiorentina	0	(0)
2008–2009	→ Cuoiovaldarno (loan)	24	(4)
2009–2010	→ Pisa (loan)	26	(2)
2010–2014	Gavorrano	108	(25)
2014	Montichiari	8	(0)
2014–2015	Ribelle	23	(8)
2015–2016	Forlì	36	(25)
2016–2018	Parma	49	(13)
2018	→ Pordenone (loan)	10	(1)
2018–2020	→ Ravenna (loan)	65	(19)
2020–2021	→ Sambenedettese (loan)	21	(3)
2021	→ Renate (loan)	17	(1)
2021–2022	Monopoli	10	(0)
2022	→ Grosseto (loan)	17	(5)
2022–2024	Giugliano	30	(3)
2023	→ Taranto (loan)	11	(0)
2024	Grosseto	1	(0)
2024-	Fidentina	37	(18)

International career
2005	Italy U-17	1	(0)
- * Club domestic league appearances and goals as of 21 January 2024

Manuel Nocciolini (born 18 May 1989) is an Italian footballer who plays as a forward for Eccellenza club Fidentina.

== Biography ==
He made his debut on the professional level in the 2008–09 season for the Lega Pro Seconda Divisione team Cuoiopelli Cappiano. Before leaving Fiorentina, he was awarded the jersey no. 39 of the first team. In 2009 Nocciolini left for Pisa in a temporary deal, winning with them Group D of 2009–10 Serie D.

In mid-2010 Nocciolini was signed by Gavorrano. Free transfer, in October 2014, agreed to a move to Montichiari; after only two months he is transferred to Ribelle. In the 2015-2016 season he was hired by Forlì, where he scored 25 goals, becoming the second top-scorer for Group D of Serie D. In the summer of 2016 he signed for Parma, competing in Lega Pro.

On 7 August 2020 he moved to Sambenedettese on loan. Sambenedettese was obligated to purchase his rights if they were to be promoted to Serie B at the end of the 2020–21 season.

On 1 February 2021 he moved on another loan to Serie C club Renate, again with an obligation for Renate to purchase him in case of the promotion to Serie B.

On 19 August 2021, he joined Monopoli on a one-year deal with an option for the second year. On 20 January 2022, he was loaned to Grosseto.

On 25 August 2022, Nocciolini signed a two-year contract with Giugliano. On 31 January 2023, he was loaned by Taranto.
