= Solnechnodolsk =

Solnechnodolsk Солнечнодольск
- Settlement
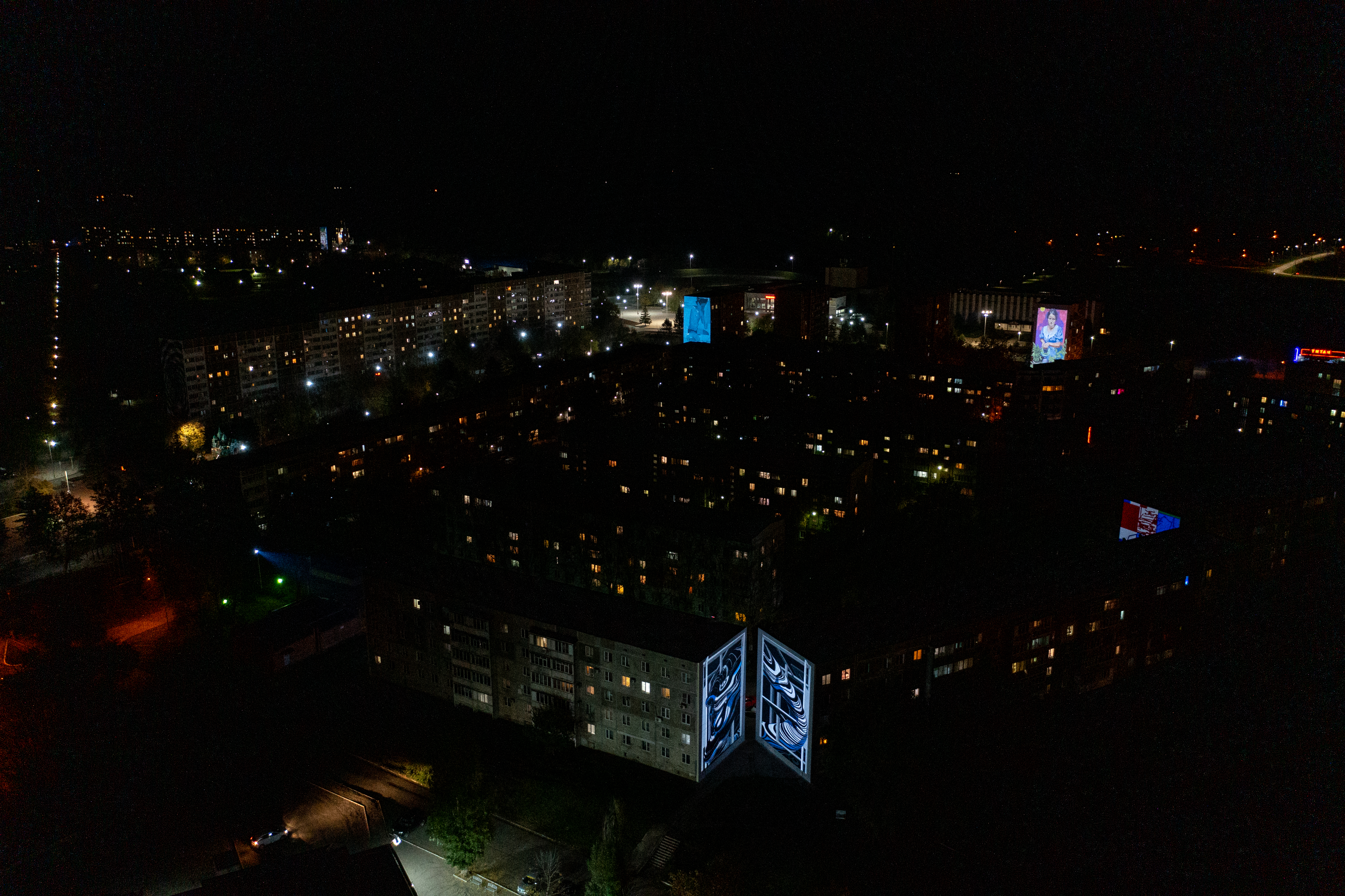
- Night in Solnechnodolsk with illumination's murals, Urban Morphogenesis festival

- Flag Coat of arms
- Interactive map of Solnechnodolsk
- Location of Solnechnodolsk Solnechnodolsk (Stavropol Krai)
- Coordinates: 45°19′N 41°32′E
- Country: Russia
- Federal subject: Stavropol Krai
- Administrative district: Izobilnensky District
- Founded: 1973

Area
  - Total: 6 km^{2} (2.3 sq mi)

Population (2010 Census)
  - Total: 12,137
  - Estimate (2025): 12,923 (+6.5%)
  - Density: 2,000/km^{2} (5,200/sq mi)
- Time zone: UTC+3 (MSK)
- Postal code: 356126
- Dialing code: +7 86545
- OKTMO ID: 07620155051

Solnechnodolsk (Russian: Солнечнодольск) is an urban locality (a settlement) in Izobilnensky District of Stavropol Krai, Russia, located on the Yegorlyk River. Population: 12,137 (2010 census); 12,929 (2002 census); 11,118 (1989 Soviet census).

Southern mammoth (Archidiskodon meridionalis) digital-mural with illumination by Dmitry Levochkin in Solnechnodolsk at night.

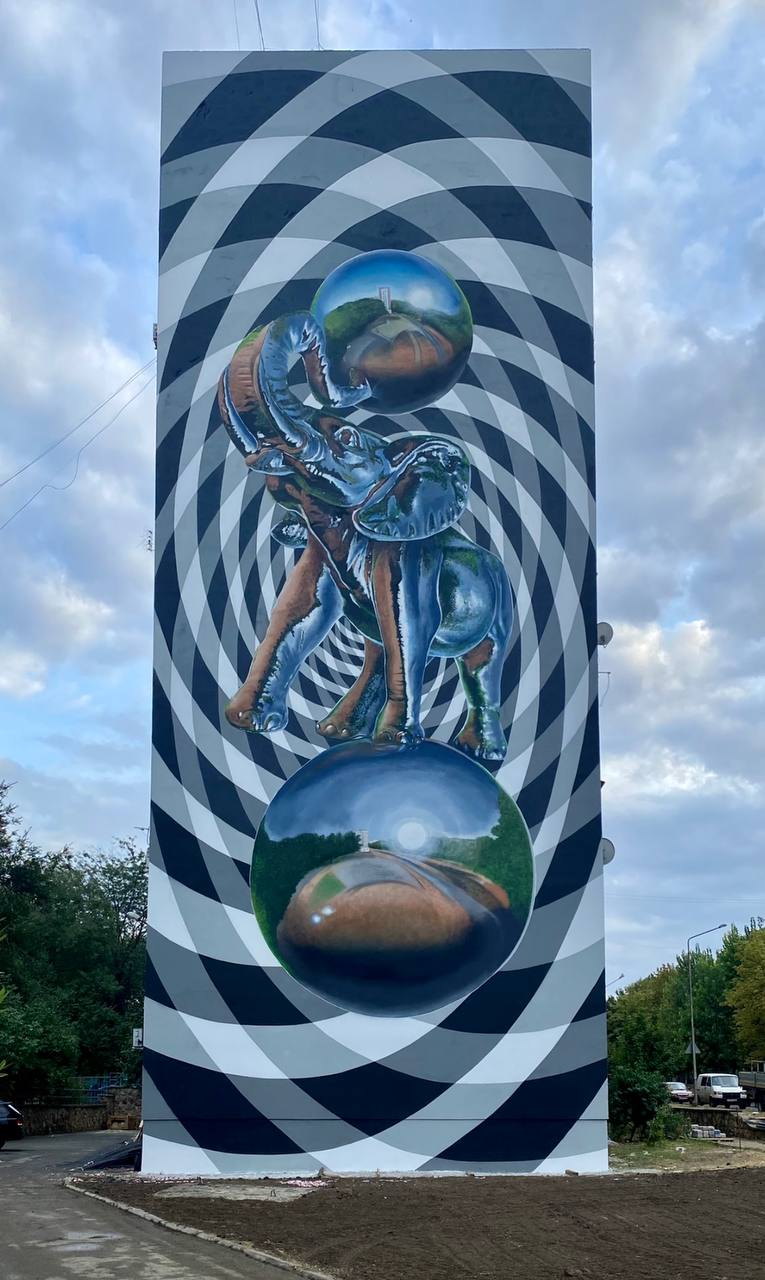
Mural at day, Solnechny (sunny) Boulevard, 5

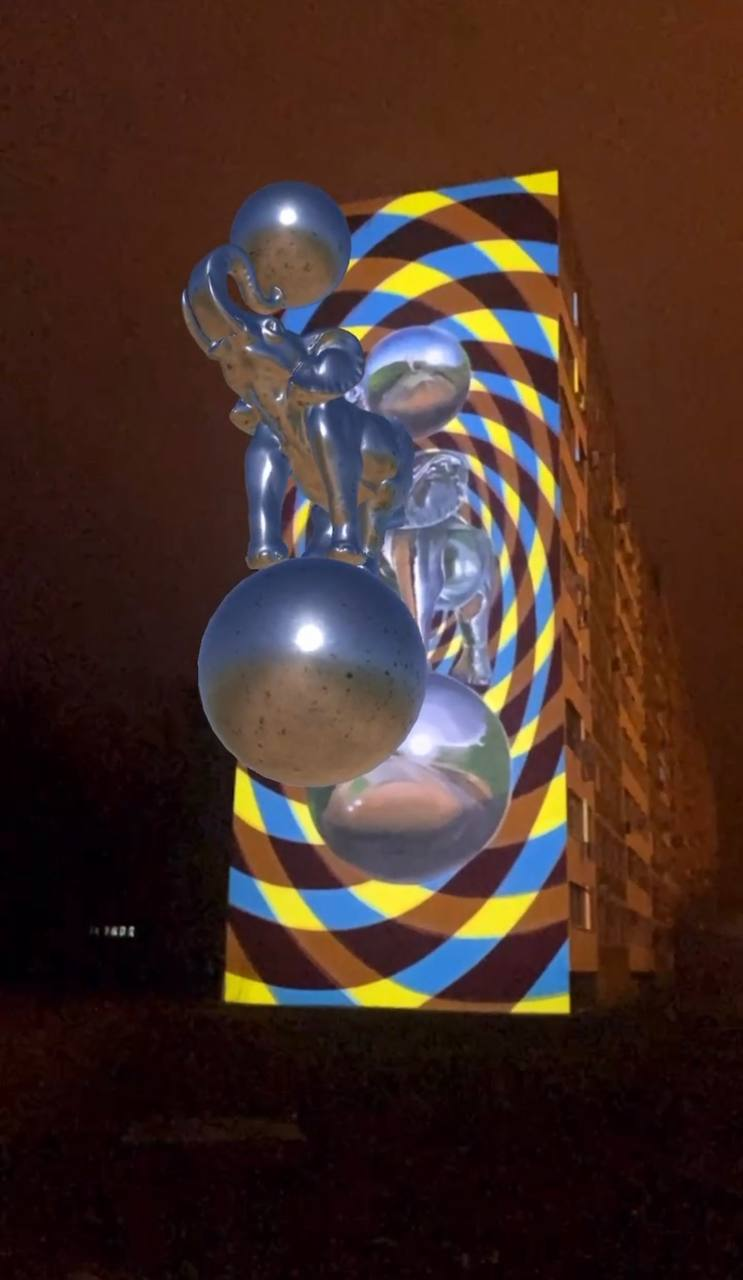
Metal mammoth at night
