= Ilario Aloe =

Italian footballer (born 1986)

Personal information
- Date of birth: 10 July 1986 (age 40)
- Place of birth: Varese, Italy
- Height: 1.72 m (5 ft 7 1/2 in)
- Position: Midfielder

Youth career
- Varese
- 2004–2006: Internazionale

Senior career*
Years	Team	Apps	(Gls)
2003–2004	Varese	9	(1)
2006–2007	Internazionale	1	(0)
2006–2007	→ Ravenna (loan)	29	(2)
2007–2008	Ravenna	29	(1)
2008–2011	Ascoli	19	(0)
2010	→ Varese (loan)	8	(0)
2010–2011	→ Pro Patria (loan)	12	(0)
2011–2012	Siracusa	1	
2012–2013	Verbano Calcio	10	
2013–2015	Ribelle		
- * Club domestic league appearances and goals

Ilario Aloe (born 10 July 1986) is an Italian footballer who last played for Ribelle.

== Career ==
Ilario Aloe was signed by Inter in 2004 from Varese of Serie C1. He then played two seasons at Inter's Primavera Team. Aloe made his Serie A debut in the last match of 2005/2006 season, against Cagliari Calcio.

In the 2006–07 season, Aloe was on loan to Ravenna Calcio of Serie C1, where he helped the club win promotion to Serie B. Aloe then was joint-owned by the two clubs for €100,000.

On 1 September 2008 Aloe was transferred to Ascoli Calcio 1898 of Serie B. Although only played 13 matches, Ascoli bought the remain registration rights from Inter and extended Aloe's contract from 2010 to June 2013.

In January 2010, after a lack of appearances, he joined Varese on loan, and re-joined former teammate Matteo Momentè. Later, Aloe was sent out on loan to Pro Patria.

On 1 July 2011 Aloe returned to Ascoli but failed to find a club to borrow him. In October, Ascoli offered for Aloe to terminate his contract.

For the next two years, Aloe spent two short stints at Siracusa and Verbano Calcio, before joining Ribelle.

== Honours and awards ==
- Primavera Cup: 2006
