= Davide Moscardelli =

Italian footballer (born 1980)

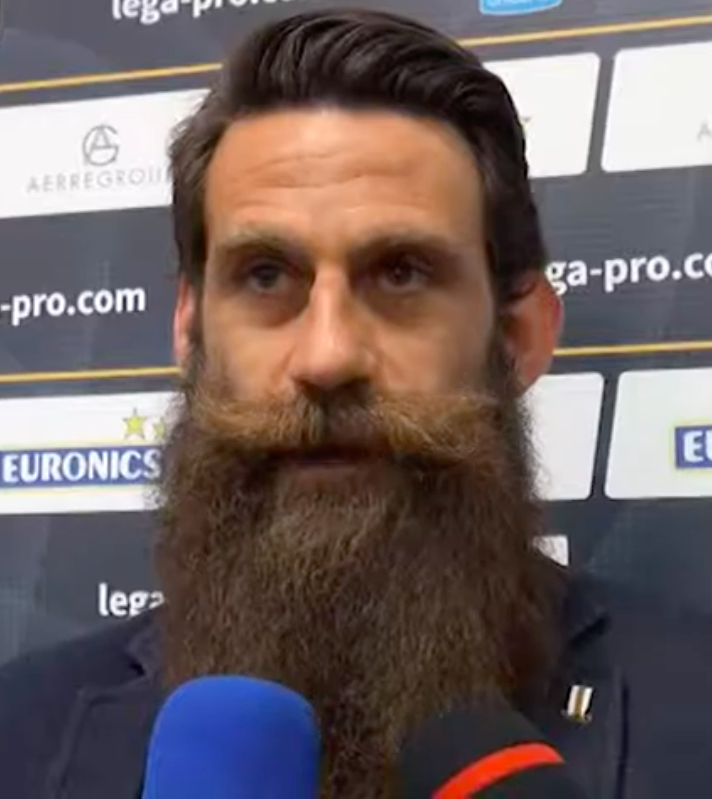
- Moscardelli in 2017

Personal information
- Full name: Davide Moscardelli
- Date of birth: 3 February 1980 (age 46)
- Place of birth: Mons, Belgium
- Height: 1.85 m (6 ft 1 in)
- Position: Striker

Youth career
- 1994–1995: Romulea
- 1995–1997: San Cesareo

Senior career*
Years	Team	Apps	(Gls)
1997–2001	Maccarese	101	(19)
2001–2002	Guidonia Montecelio	27	(20)
2002–2003	Sangiovannese	30	(15)
2003–2005	Triestina	78	(23)
2005–2007	Rimini	63	(15)
2007–2008	Cesena	40	(15)
2008–2010	Piacenza	77	(22)
2010–2013	Chievo	66	(10)
2013–2014	Bologna	26	(2)
2014–2016	Lecce	62	(25)
2016–2018	Arezzo	62	(28)
2018–2020	Pisa	45	(10)
Total		677	(201)
- * Club domestic league appearances and goals

Davide Moscardelli (born 3 February 1980) is an Italian former professional footballer who played as a striker. A dynamic forward, Moscardelli possessed good technical ability and strength. He is famous for his acrobatic goals, as well as his iconic beard.

Starting from the Promozione—the seventh tier in Italian football—in 1997, Moscardelli climbed the Italian football league system and reached the Serie C2, the fourth tier, in 2002. Between 2003–04 and 2009–10, Moscardelli played seven consecutive seasons in the Serie B, for Triestina, Rimini, Cesena, and Piacenza. In 2010–11 Moscardelli debuted in the Serie A with Chievo, with whom he stayed three seasons, before playing for fellow top-tier side Bologna for two seasons, his last in the Italian top division. Between 2014 and 2019, Moscardelli spent his career in the Italian third division, before playing his last season, 2019–20, with Pisa in Serie B.

Moscardelli scored 77 goals in eight Serie B seasons, and 61 goals in six Lega Pro/Serie C seasons. He played over 700 games in all competitions, scoring over 200 goals.

== Early life ==
Moscardelli was born in Mons, Belgium, on 3 February 1980, as his father, along with his family, was working in Belgium for the Italian Air Force. Moscardelli then moved to Rome, Italy, his parents' city of origin, where he took his first steps as a footballer.

== Club career ==
=== Early career ===
Moscardelli started his career with an Italian amateur club from Maccarese, Fiumicino, Lazio, which played in Promozione Lazio (1997–2000, seventh level) and Eccellenza Lazio (2000–01, sixth level). He scored 20 league goals in 27 league games with his new team Guidonia Montecelio in 2001–02 Eccellenza Lazio season. However, he also caused the team to be deducted 10 points, after he was made to play despite being disqualified. The team still got promoted despite the heavy penalty, as the club defeated Umbrian side Deruta in the Eccellenza national promotion play-offs, as one of the 7 winners.

His efficiency attracted the interest of Serie A side Chievo who offered him a professional contract, but farmed him to Serie C2 side Sangiovannese in a co-ownership deal. With the Tuscany based team, he scored an average of 0.5 goals per league games. In June 2003, Sangiovannese bought him outright, but sold him to Serie B side Triestina in a co-ownership deal for €250,000 fee, on a 4-year contract.

=== Serie B teams ===
With the Venezia Giulia based team, he partnered with Denis Godeas and they scored 26 goals in total, exceed half of the team scored. Moscardelli himself netted 16 times in 42 Serie B games. In June 2004 Triestina acquired the remaining 50% registration rights of Moscardelli, for an additional €500,000 fee. In the next season he played less regularly (36 games) and scored 7 Serie B goals, while his partner Godeas scored 14 times and substitute Alessandro Tulli scored 5 times. Triestina finished just above the relegation zone and enter the play-off for relegation tie-breaker and the team won 4–0 to Vicenza in aggregate. Moscardelli substituted Tulli in the second half of the first leg of the play-off and he did not play the second leg.

At the start of 2005–06 season, Eder Baù partnered with Godeas in 2005–06 Coppa Italia first match, and Moscardelli replaced Dino Baggio in the second half, that match the Trieste based team lost 0–3 to Padova. He was sold near the start of Serie B first round, co-currently the team signed Isah Eliakwu from Inter Milan.

Moscardelli joined Serie B newcomer Rimini on 27 August 2005. In his first season with Rimini, he rotated with Simone Motta and Sergio Floccari for the 2 strikers place until January Floccari departed. He scored in his club debut on 10 September, that match he partnered with Motta and Moscardelli scored 1 goals; after Moscardelli was substituted by Floccari, Motta scored 2 more goals in 85 and 95 minutes and made Rimini won 4–2 against Catanzaro. He scored 6 goals in 31 games.

In the next season, Rimini signed keeper Samir Handanovič, strikers Jeda and Alessandro Matri (which later all became regular in Serie A), the team made a breakthrough, finished as the 5th, while Moscardelli and Matri mainly as backup, made 11 and 10 start respectively. Despite only making 11 starts, he scored 9 goals and Matri 4.

At the start of 2007–08 Serie B season, he played twice for Rimini at 2007–08 Coppa Italia, scored 1 goal. He played both matches as second-half substitutes. However, in August 2007 he was sold to fellow Serie B team Cesena (and regional rival, both in Romagna) in another co-ownership deal, for €650,000 in 4-year contract. At Cesena, Moscardelli played 40 Serie B matches as starter. He partnered with Andrea Ferretti, Milan Đurić and Daniele Paponi (since January) and scored 15 goals, but Cesena finished bottom and relegated, with the fewest goal scored.

In June 2008, Rimini bought him back for €550,000 and re-sold to Piacenza in another co-ownership deal (also another Emilia–Romagna team) for an undisclosed fee. He signed a 3-year contract and to replace the void of Daniele Cacia. With the Emilia side, Moscardelli secured a place in the forward role, and partnered with Emanuele Ferraro, Mattia Graffiedi, Tomás Guzmán and/or Jonathan Aspas in 3 strikers role, which Moscardelli mainly as centre forward and other mainly as wing forward/supporting strikers. That season Piacenza finished in mid-table and neither scored a double figure.

In 2009–10 season, Moscardelli's one of the partner was often fixed to Simone Guerra which Moscardelli scored 14 league goals. That season Piacenza only scored 40 goals and finished as the 15th out of 22 teams.

In June 2010, Rimini decided to give up the remain 50% rights to Piacenza. He started in the pre-season friendlies.

=== Chievo ===
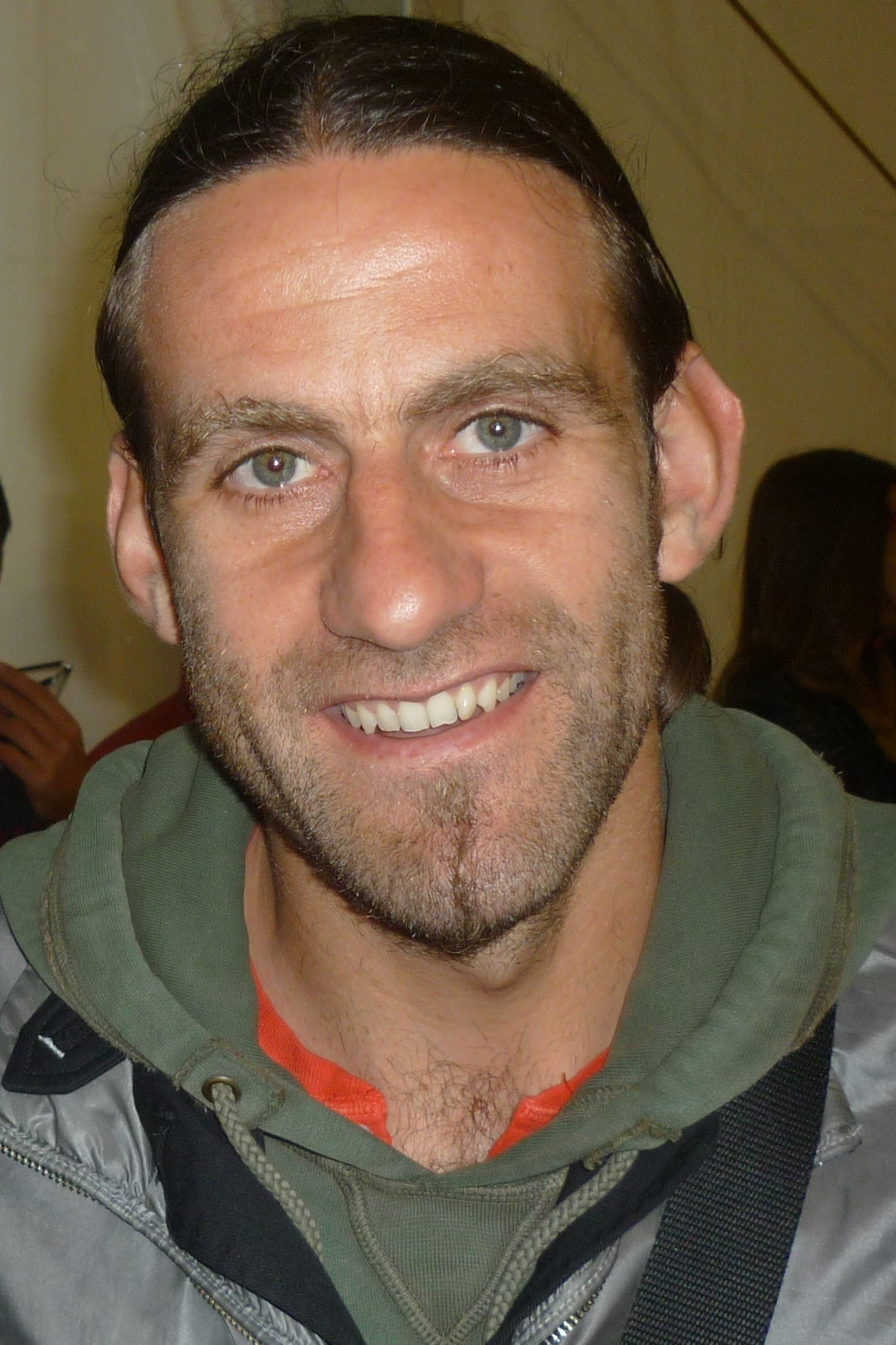
Moscardelli in 2012

In August 2010, he was sold to Serie A side Chievo after Chievo failed to sign Riccardo Meggiorini and Matteo Ardemagni to partner with their flagship striker Sergio Pellissier. Chievo had released forwards Erjon Bogdani and Elvis Abbruscato; only Pablo Granoche and Marcos de Paula were available. Piacenza also re-signed Daniele Cacia, made Moscardelli's starting place became uncertain. As part of the deal, Chievo loaned Alessandro Sbaffo (with a pre-set price to buy) and Cesare Rickler to the Emilia–Romagna; Chievo did not announce the contract length of the player.

Moscardelli made a good start in his second spells with the Veneto side. He scored on his Serie A debut, a 2–1 win against Catania on 29 August 2010. In the next match, He scored a goal in an away match that won Genoa 3–1. However, he soon shared the starting place with Cyril Thereau, another forward, except the absence of Pellissier. They became partner on the front when Pellissier was absent.

As he made his Serie A debut, his former clubs claimed Chievo to pay a special training compensation called "Premio alla carriera", but Chievo refused, however FIGC awarded Maccarese €54,000 (3 seasons), San Cesareo €36,000 (2 seasons) and Romulea €18,000 (1 season). In July 2011 he extended his contract to 30 June 2013.

=== Bologna ===
On 30 January 2013, Moscardelli signed for Bologna F.C. 1909. He spent two seasons at the club and was mainly used as a substitute managing only to score 2 goals.

=== Lecce ===
On 31 July 2014, he signed with Lega Pro side US Lecce on a free transfer. In his second season with the club they successfully made it to the Promotion Play-offs-Finals but were beaten in the 2nd round to US Foggia losing 4–2 on aggregate.

=== Arezzo ===
On 11 July 2016, Moscardelli signed for Arezzo on a free transfer. In his first season with Arezzo they finished fourth place in their group and qualified for the promotion play-offs. Despite taking an early lead in the match with a goal from Moscardelli they went on to lose the first round to A.S. Lucchese Libertas 1905 being defeated 1–2 at home.

=== Pisa ===
On 3 July 2018, he joined Pisa after being released by Arezzo. In his first season with Pisa they finished third in their group and qualified for the Serie C promotion playoffs. Moscardelli scored an important goal in the home fixture against Carrarese that would see them through to the next round of the competition. Pisa would win their promotion match against Triestina and would see Moscardelli return to the Serie B after nearly a decade.

Moscardelli announced his retirement on 29 August 2020, and subsequently joined the staff at Pisa.

== Style of play ==
A left-footed forward, Moscardelli is both mobile and physically strong, and possesses excellent individual technique. Also capable of playing as a central striker, Moscardelli is mainly a second striker, who is able to play in all of the attacking area starting from the distance. Moscardelli is known for his acrobatic goals. He was nicknamed Battigol as he was compared with Gabriel Batistuta during his stay with Serie B teams.

== Personal life ==
Moscardelli has an older brother, who has played football as a forward at amateur level. He is married to Guendalina, with whom he has two children. The two got married on 5 December 2011 in Verona. His wedding witness, as well as his friend and former teammate at Rimini, was Francesco Valiani.

In addition to his football qualities, Moscardelli is widely known for his beard, which has been dubbed the "most famous beard in football". Indeed, he has refrained from shaving his beard since 2 February 2013.

In May 2019 a YouTube video showcasing highlights of Moscardelli's plays—titled Davide Moscardelli Is Too Good For Ballon d'Or—went viral, amassing over 5 million views in less than two weeks.

== Career statistics ==
=== Club ===
Appearances and goals by club, season and competition
Club	Season	League			Coppa Italia		Other		Total	
Club	Season	Division	Apps	Goals	Apps	Goals	Apps	Goals	Apps	Goals
Maccarese	1997–98	Promozione	13	2	—		—		13	2
Maccarese	1998–99	Promozione	28	4	—		—		28	4
Maccarese	1999–2000	Promozione	29	5	—		—		29	5
Maccarese	2000–01	Eccellenza	31	8	—		—		31	8
Maccarese	Total		101	19	—		—		101	19
Guidonia Montecelio	2001–02	Eccellenza	27	20	0	0	2 (Note: Appearances in Eccellenza play-off)	2	29	20
Sangiovannese	2002–03	Serie C2	30	15	0	0	2 (Note: Appearances in Coppa Italia Serie C)	0	32	15
Triestina	2003–04	Serie B	42	16	1	0	—		43	16
Triestina	2004–05	Serie B	36	7	2	0	1 (Note: Appearance in Serie B play-out)	0	39	7
Triestina	2005–06	Serie B	0	0	1	0	—		1	0
Triestina	Total		78	23	4	0	1	0	83	23
Rimini	2005–06	Serie B	31	6	0	0	—		31	6
Rimini	2006–07	Serie B	32	9	2	0	—		34	9
Rimini	2007–08	Serie B	0	0	2	1	—		2	1
Rimini	Total		63	15	4	1	—		67	16
Cesena	2007–08	Serie B	40	15	0	0	—		40	15
Piacenza	2008–09	Serie B	40	8	0	0	—		40	8
Piacenza	2009–10	Serie B	37	14	1	1	—		38	15
Piacenza	Total		77	22	1	1	—		78	23
Chievo	2010–11	Serie A	34	6	2	1	—		36	7
Chievo	2011–12	Serie A	25	4	2	0	—		27	4
Chievo	2012–13	Serie A	7	0	2	0	—		9	0
Chievo	Total		66	10	6	1	—		72	11
Bologna	2012–13	Serie A	9	1	0	0	—		9	1
Bologna	2013–14	Serie A	17	1	2	1	—		19	2
Bologna	Total		26	2	2	1	—		28	3
Lecce	2014–15	Lega Pro	32	15	2	1	—		34	16
Lecce	2015–16	Lega Pro	30	10	2	0	2 (Note: Appearances in Lega Pro play-off)	2	34	12
Lecce	Total		62	25	4	1	2	2	68	28
Arezzo	2016–17	Lega Pro	32	16	2	0	2 (Note: One appearance and one goal in Lega Pro play-off, one appearance and one goal in Coppa Italia Serie C)	2	36	18
Arezzo	2017–18	Serie C	30	12	1	0	—		31	12
Arezzo	Total		62	28	3	0	2	2	67	30
Pisa	2018–19	Serie C	29	8	3	2	18 (Note: 16 appearances and two goals in Serie C play-off, two appearances and three goals in Coppa Italia Serie C)	5	50	15
Pisa	2019–20	Serie B	16	2	1	0	—		17	2
Pisa	Total		45	10	4	2	18	5	67	17
Career total			677	201	28	7	27	11	732	219

== Honours ==
Rimini

- Super Coppa di Lega Serie C1: 2005
