= Ciampino =

Comune in Lazio, Italy

- Comune
- Città di Ciampino
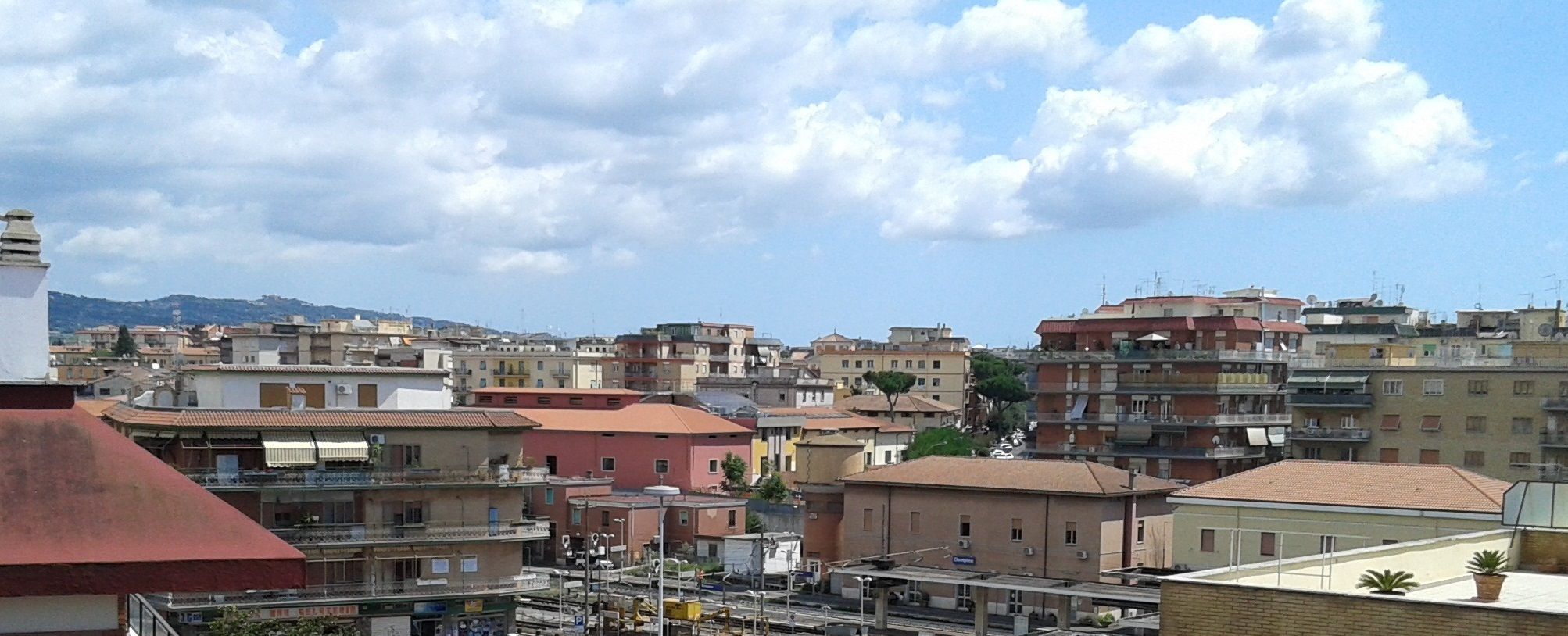
- View of downtown Ciampino

- Coat of arms

- location of Ciampino in the Metropolitan City of Rome Capital

- Location of Ciampino in Lazio Ciampino (Italy) Ciampino (European Union)
- Coordinates: 41°48′N 12°36′E
- Country: Italy
- Region: Lazio
- Metropolitan city: Rome (RM)

Government
  - Mayor: Emanuela Colella (PD)

Area
  - Total: 11 km^{2} (4.2 sq mi)
- Elevation: 124 m (407 ft)

Population (31 August 2020)
  - Total: 38,277
  - Density: 3,500/km^{2} (9,000/sq mi)
- Demonym: Ciampinesi
- Time zone: UTC+1 (CET)
  - Summer (DST): UTC+2 (CEST)
- Postal code: 00040, 00043
- Dialing code: 06
- Patron saint: Sacred Heart of Jesus
- Saint day: 19 days after Pentecost
- Website: Official website

Ciampino (pronounced [tʃamˈpiːno]) is a city and comune in the Metropolitan City of Rome, Lazio, Italy. It was a frazione of Marino until 1974, when it became a comune; it obtained the city (Italian: città) status (being therefore officially known as Città di Ciampino) in 2004 by a presidential decree.

It is best known for the local "Giovan Battista Pastine" International Airport, best known as Rome Ciampino, a military airport which also hosts several civil flights, especially from low-cost companies such as Ryanair. The city is named after Giovanni Giustino Ciampini, a religious, scientist and archaeologist who lived here in the 17th century. It grew from 5,000 inhabitants in 1951 to 28,000 in 1971. Today, the city has circa 38,700 inhabitants.

== Climate ==
According to the Köppen Climate Classification system, Ciampino has a hot-summer Mediterranean climate, abbreviated "Csa" on climate maps.

Climate data for Ciampino airport (1991–2020)
Month	Jan	Feb	Mar	Apr	May	Jun	Jul	Aug	Sep	Oct	Nov	Dec	Year
Mean daily maximum °C (°F)	12.0 (53.6)	13.0 (55.4)	15.8 (60.4)	18.8 (65.8)	23.3 (73.9)	28.1 (82.6)	31.0 (87.8)	31.6 (88.9)	26.7 (80.1)	22.2 (72.0)	16.9 (62.4)	12.7 (54.9)	21.0 (69.8)
Daily mean °C (°F)	7.5 (45.5)	8.0 (46.4)	10.7 (51.3)	13.6 (56.5)	18.0 (64.4)	22.5 (72.5)	25.1 (77.2)	25.4 (77.7)	21.0 (69.8)	17.0 (62.6)	12.4 (54.3)	8.5 (47.3)	15.8 (60.5)
Mean daily minimum °C (°F)	3.4 (38.1)	3.4 (38.1)	5.9 (42.6)	8.6 (47.5)	12.6 (54.7)	16.7 (62.1)	19.3 (66.7)	19.8 (67.6)	16.0 (60.8)	12.4 (54.3)	8.5 (47.3)	4.7 (40.5)	10.9 (51.7)
Average precipitation mm (inches)	65.6 (2.58)	62.8 (2.47)	58.6 (2.31)	68.6 (2.70)	56.9 (2.24)	30.1 (1.19)	19.8 (0.78)	30.2 (1.19)	64.9 (2.56)	88.1 (3.47)	108.2 (4.26)	98.3 (3.87)	752.1 (29.62)
Average precipitation days (≥ 1.0 mm)	7.4	7.5	6.9	7.4	5.5	3.4	2.2	2.2	6.0	7.3	8.8	9.4	74
Average relative humidity (%)	75.8	71.5	70.6	70.4	69.0	65.4	63.3	64.1	69.1	74.0	77.9	77.2	70.7
Average dew point °C (°F)	3.9 (39.0)	3.5 (38.3)	5.8 (42.4)	8.5 (47.3)	12.1 (53.8)	15.1 (59.2)	16.9 (62.4)	17.7 (63.9)	15.5 (59.9)	12.9 (55.2)	9.3 (48.7)	5.2 (41.4)	10.5 (51.0)
Mean monthly sunshine hours	131.7	145.6	181.9	203.3	263.6	287.2	334.3	309.5	232.8	189.2	134.4	122.6	2,536.1
Source: NOAA, (Sun 1981-2010)

== Sports ==
A.S.D. Polisportiva Ciampino and Polisportiva Città di Ciampino (Pol.D. Città di Ciampino) were the football clubs of the city. The first team of Città di Ciampino withdrew from Eccellenza Lazio in 2018, focusing on youth sector.

In the past, the city had another club, Associazione Polisportiva Dilettantistica Ciampino, which was folded in 2014 by selling its position in the league to A.S.D. Trastevere Calcio.
