= ASD Roma City FC =

Italian football club

Roma City
- Full name: Associazione Sportiva Dilettantistica; Roma City Football Club
Founded
1948	(Pol.D. Fregene)
2016	(merger of Sporting Città di Fiumicino and Fregene)
2019	(merger of SFF Atletico and Atletico Fiuggi Terme)
2022	(renamed Roma City and relocated in Riano)
- Ground: Riano Athletic Center, Riano
- Chairman: Tonino Doino
- Head coach: Andrea Campolattano
- League: Eccellenza Lazio
- Website: https://romacityfc.com/

A.S.D. Roma City F.C. or in short, Roma City is an Italian football club based in Riano, Lazio region. The club plays in the Eccellenza Lazio, fifth division of Italian football

The club in its most recent incarnation originates from the relocation and renaming of Atletico Fiuggi Terme, itself a club born out of a number of mergers and renamings.

== History ==
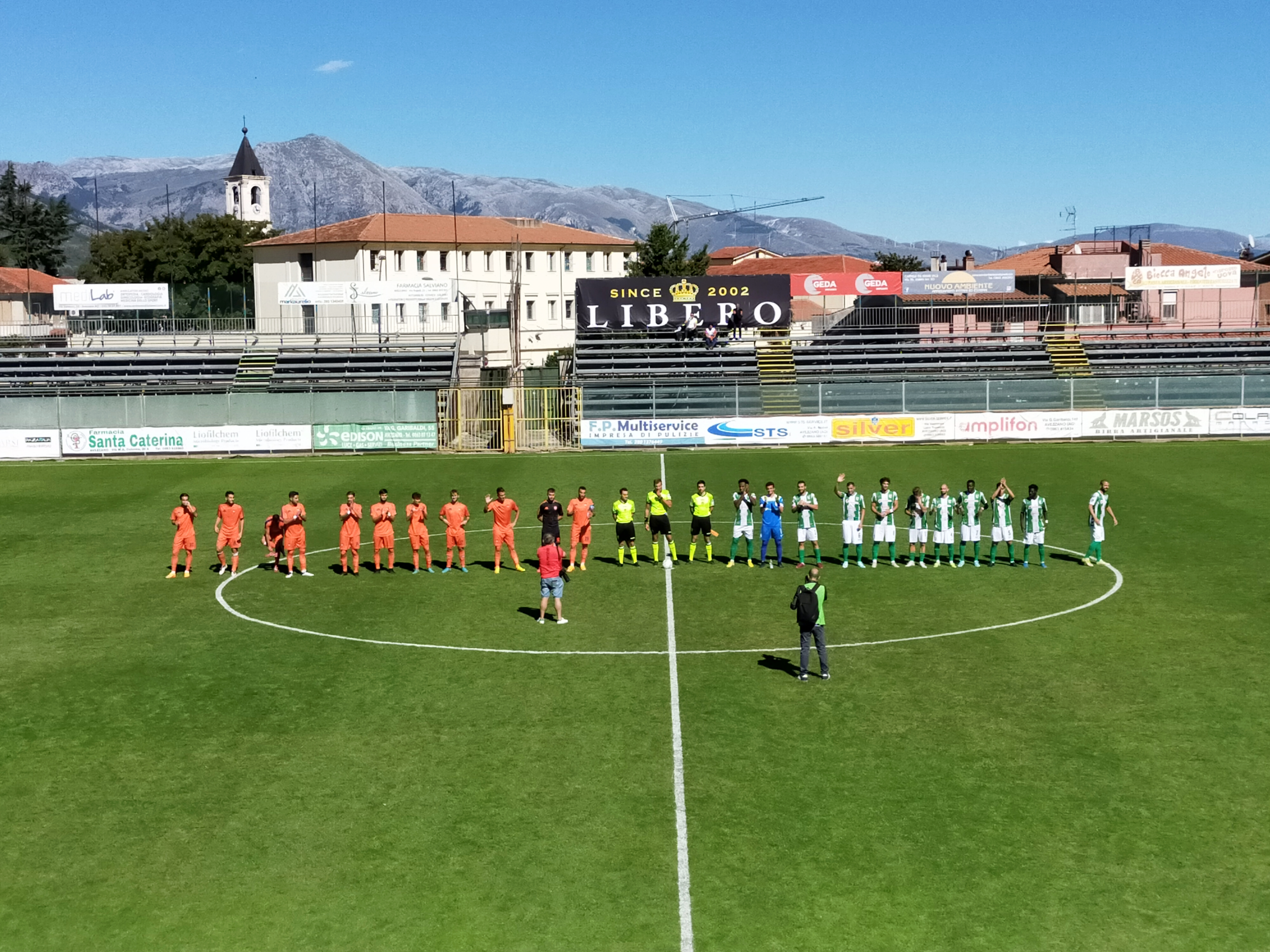
Avezzano-Roma City (2022–23 Serie D)

=== A.S.D. Sporting Città di Fiumicino ===
A.S.D. Sporting Città di Fiumicino was a football club from Fiumicino, a comune that split from Rome comune in 1992. The registration number of the club was 940,722. In the last season as Sporting Città di Fiumicino, the club finished as the runner-up of 2015–16 Eccellenza Lazio Group A. At the end of 2015–16 season Sporting Città di Fiumicino was merged with Pol.D. Fregene. They are both from Fiumicino. Sporting Città di Fiumicino itself, was formed by a merger of A.S.D. Città di Fiumicino (81,943) and A.S.D. Sporting Fiumicino. The merge was gazetted in 2014, but according to the club itself, they merged in 2013.

A.S.D. Città di Fiumicino was founded in 1985. It formerly known as A.S. Juventus Fiumicino and from 2002 as A.S. 85 Fiumicino. The club was later known as A.S.D. 85 Fiumicino until 2011, which was renamed to A.S.D. Città di Fiumicino. The club finished as the third in the group C of 2011–12 Prima Categoria Lazio Group C. Città di Fiumicino was promoted to Promozione Lazio by repêchage in 2012. In 2012–13 Promozione Lazio season, there were derbies between Città di Fiumicino and namesake and major team of the city, Fiumicino Calcio. Fiumicino was relegated in 2011–12 Eccellenza Lazio season. In 2012–13 Promozione Lazio season, Città di Fiumicino finished as the 8th, and Fiumicino was relegated again as the 18th. In 2013–14 season, Città di Fiumicino was promoted from Promozione Lazio to Eccellenza Lazio, despite finished as the runner-up of the promotional play-offs. The club merged with Sporting Fiumicino as Sporting Città di Fiumicino in July 2014.

In 2014, the newly established Sporting Città di Fiumicino played a pre-season friendly with Roman club S.S. Lazio, losing 0–16. That season the club finished as the runner-up of 2014–15 Eccellenza Lazio. The club was a losing side in the national promotion play-offs round. Moreover, the club was removed as a candidate for repêchage to 2015–16 Serie D, as the predecessor of the club, Città di Fiumicino was a repêchage in 2012 and again in 2014.

In 2016 the club finished again as the runner-up of Eccellenza Lazio and qualified again to the national promotion play-offs round of Eccellenza, losing to Pineto in aggregate.

=== Pol.D. Fregene ===
Polisportiva Dilettantistica Fregene, formerly Polisportiva Fregene and Pol. Fregene in short, was a football club from Fregene, a frazione of Fiumicino comune, which it was previously part of Rome comune until 1992. Both Fiumicino (XXXVII) and Fregene (XXXVIII) were previously separate zones of Circoscrizione XIV of Rome. Pol. Fregene was founded in 1948. The club was incorporated from 1980 to 1989. The club finished as the third in 1988–89 Promozione Lazio season, at that time the 6th highest level. The club won 1990–91 Promozione Lazio season, and qualified to the newly established Eccellenza Lazio, the new 6th level in 1991.

The club promoted from Eccellenza Lazio to Serie D in 1998. The club relegated in 2000.

In the last season as Fregene, the club finished as the 11th of 2015–16 Eccellenza Lazio Group A. Since the disestablishment of Lega Pro Seconda Divisione (ex-Serie C2) in 2014, Eccellenza was the 5th highest level.

Aristide Paglialunga stadium was the home stadium of Fregene.

=== A.S.D. S.F.F. Atletico ===
The club was formed by a merger of A.S.D. Sporting Città di Fiumicino and Pol.D. Fregene in 2016.

A.S.D. S.F.F. Atletico is a team from Fiumicino, a comune and a suburb of Rome metro area, and administratively part of the Metropolitan City of Rome Capital, formerly the province of Rome. A.S.D. stands for associazione sportiva dilettantistica, while S.F.F. Atletico, according to Il Messaggero, means Sporting Fregene Focene Atletico. The club was founded in 2016 by a merger of A.S.D. Sporting Città di Fiumicino and Pol.D. Fregene. Focene and Fregene were the frazioni of the comune. The new club retained the registration number of Fregene (19,780), while the registration of Sporting Città di Fiumicino had become A.S.D. Atletico Fiumicino, but withdrew from Eccellenza Lazio. A formal merge of S.F.F. Atletico and Atletico Fiumicino was gazetted in 2017. The new registration number of the club was 947,003. The new club was an affiliated club of Lazian club Frosinone.

In 2017, the club promoted to Serie D. The club almost promoted again in 2018 by finished as the third of group G. The team also lost to Trastevere in the semi-finals of the promotion play-offs of group G. Despite winner of the promotion play-offs only granted a higher position as a repechage candidate of 2018–19 Serie C.

The club played in Aristide Paglialunga stadium, in Fregene, frazione of Fiumicino.

=== Atletico Terme Fiuggi ===
In July 2019, SFF Atletico agreed a merger with Atletico Fiuggi Terme, a smaller club in the city of Fiuggi, thus allowing the new club to relocate from Fiumicino to Fiuggi itself under the new denomination of Atletico Terme Fiuggi.

=== Roma City ===
In July 2022, Rome-born American entrepreneur Tonino Doino acquired Atletico Terme Fiuggi with the aim of turning it into the third club of the Italian capital. As such, he renamed the club Roma City and relocated it to Riano, in the outskirts of the city. In their debut season, Roma City hired former Roma and Italy international player Francesco Statuto as new head coach and, throughout the course of their 2022–23 Serie D campaign, signed former Lazio defender Modibo Diakité and former Widzew Łódź and İstanbul Başakşehir striker Stefano Napoleoni. Despite their top signings, Roma City went down to Eccellenza after losing to San Nicolò Notaresco in a relegation playoff.

On 19 June 2023, just a month after having suffered relegation, Roma City announced to have acquired the sports rights of Serie D club Vis Artena, and therefore they will retain a spot in the top amateur league of Italy as a consequence.

== Honours ==
S.F.F. Atletico

- Eccellenza Lazio
  - Winner (1): 2016–17

Fregene

- Eccellenza Lazio
  - Winner (1): 1997–98
- Promozione Lazio
  - Winner (1): 1990–91
