= Izobilny =

Izobilny (Russian: Изобильный; masculine), Izobilnaya (Изобильная; feminine), or Izobilnoye (Изобильное; neuter) is the name of several inhabited localities in Russia.

== Modern localities ==
Urban localities

- Izobilny, Stavropol Krai, a town in Izobilnensky District of Stavropol Krai

Rural localities

- Izobilny, Krasnodar Krai, a settlement in Novoumansky Rural Okrug of Leningradsky District of Krasnodar Krai
- Izobilny, Rostov Oblast, a khutor in Yegorlykskoye Rural Settlement of Yegorlyksky District of Rostov Oblast
- Izobilnoye, Kaliningrad Oblast, a settlement in Saransky Rural Okrug of Polessky District of Kaliningrad Oblast
- Izobilnoye, Krasnodar Krai, a selo in Rudyevsky Rural Okrug of Otradnensky District of Krasnodar Krai
- Izobilnoye, Orenburg Oblast, a selo in Izobilny Selsoviet of Sol-Iletsky District of Orenburg Oblast

== Renamed localities ==
- Izobilnoye, until 1965, the name of Izobilny, a town in Izobilnensky District of Stavropol Krai
