= ASD Ferentino Calcio =

Italian football club

Ferentino
- Full name: Associazione Sportiva Dilettantistica Ferentino Calcio
- Founded: 1931; 95 years ago as, Associazione Sportiva Dilettantistica Ferentino Calcio; 2009; 17 years ago as, Pro Calcio Ferentino (refounded); 2016; 10 years ago as, SSD Ferentino Calcio ARL
- Ground: Stadio Comunale di Ferentino, Ferentino, Italy
- Capacity: 2,100
- League: Eccellenza
- 2008–09: Serie D/G, 16th
Home colours	Away colours

Associazione Sportiva Dilettantistica Ferentino Calcio was an Italian association football club located in Ferentino, Lazio. Formed in 1931, it is now known as SSD Ferentino Calcio.

== History ==
The club was founded in 1931.

In its last season 2008–09 it was relegated from Serie D/G to Eccellenza Lazio.

=== The transfer to Ceccano ===
In summer 2009 the side, after the merger with Associazione Sportiva Ceccano, transferred the seat and its sports title of Eccellenza to the city of Ceccano becoming Associazione Sportiva Dilettantistica Ceccano. Because of this merger, Ferentino has effectively disappeared from the Italian football panorama.

== Colors and badge ==
Its colors were all-dark red and white.
