= Polisportiva Città di Ciampino =

Italian football club

Città di Ciampino
- Full name: Polisportiva Città di Ciampino
- Founded: 2000
- Dissolved: 2018 (first team only)
- Ground: Sportivo Comunale Superga
- Capacity: 400
- Coordinates: 41°47′7″N 12°37′6″E
- Chairman: Antonio Paolo Cececotto
- League: N/A
- 2017–18: Eccellenza Lazio, Group A, 8th of 18
- Website: https://www.polisportivacittadiciampino.it

Polisportiva Città di Ciampino, also known as Pol. Città di Ciampino or just Città di Ciampino, is an Italian football club based in Ciampino, in the Metropolitan City of Rome Capital (formerly the province of Rome). Città di Ciampino became the major club of the city, after A.P.D. Ciampino, folded in 2014 by selling its position in the league to A.S.D. Trastevere Calcio. Città di Ciampino participated in 2016–17 Serie D, the fourth highest division of Italy. However, Città di Ciampino relegated in 2017 and the first team withdrew from Eccellenza Lazio in 2018, focusing on youth sector only.

== History ==
Città di Ciampino was founded in 2000. In 2014, after the major club of the city, A.P.D. Ciampino, sold its position in the league (in Eccellenza Lazio) to become A.S.D. Trastevere Calcio, Città di Ciampino became the major club of the city instead. Città di Ciampino won 2014–15 Promozione Lazio, the Italian 6th highest level (since 2014, 7th from 1991 to 2014) in mid-2015. The club won another promotion in mid-2016 from Eccellenza Lazio to Serie D, the top level of Italian non-professional (amateur) football, and the 4th highest level overall. However, the club relegated after playing the single Serie D season.

In 2018, the first team of the club withdrew from Eccellenza Lazio in 2018, focusing on youth sector only.

== Stadium ==
Sportivo Comunale Superga, or known as Stadio Comunale Superga or just Stadio Superga, is the home stadium of Pol. Città di Ciampino. It had 400 seats.

== Rivalries ==
In the past, there was another club from the same city, Associazione Polisportiva Dilettantistica Ciampino or A.P.D. Ciampino in short. The FIGC registration number of that club was 650,852. That club was based on another sport centre, Centro Sportivo Arnaldo Fuso, on 9 Via Cagliari (a road that named after Cagliari). That club promoted to 2013–14 Eccellenza Lazio as a repêchage in August 2013. However, that club sold its position in the league to A.S.D. Trastevere Calcio in 2014, making the latter "promoted" again in a second succession.

A phoenix club of A.P.D. Ciampino was founded in 2017 in the same sport centre as Associazione Sportiva Dilettantistica Polisportiva Ciampino, or A.S.D. Pol. Ciampino in short. That club had a registration number of 947,465.

A.P.D. Ciampino and Pol. Città di Ciampino had a derby in the league in 2012–13 Promozione Lazio season. A.P.D. Ciampino finished as the third of group C, while Pol. Città di Ciampino finished as the sixth of the same group.

In 2014, Roman team A.S.D. ALMAS Roma, moved their headquarter from Rome to Ciampino. That club moved back to Rome in 2017. That club, as of 2018–19 season, still used the Centro Sportivo Arnnaldo Fuso in Ciampino, as their home stadium. In 2015–16 season and 2017–18 season, despite both ALMAS and Città di Ciampino were in the same division, Eccellenza Lazio, they were not in the same group.

== Honours ==
- Eccellenza Lazio
  - Winner (1): 2015–16
- Promozione Lazio
  - Winner (1): 2014–15

== See also ==
- A.S.D. Città di Marino Calcio, a defunct football club from nearby city Marino, in the Metropolitan City of Rome Capital
- Pol. Monterotondo Lupa, a defunct football club also from the Metropolitan City of Rome Capital
- Pol. Maccarese Giada, a defunct football club also from the Metropolitan City of Rome Capital
