= Ryzdvyany =

Ryzdvyany Рыздвяный
- Urban-type settlement
- Interactive map of Ryzdvyany
- Location of Ryzdvyany Ryzdvyany (Stavropol Krai)
- Coordinates: 45.2614°N 41.8451°E
- Country: Russia
- Federal subject: Stavropol Krai
- Administrative district: Izobilnensky District
- Founded: 1896

Population (2010 Census)
  - Total: 7,710
  - Estimate (2025): 7,567 (−1.9%)
- Time zone: UTC+3 (MSK)
- Postal code: 356110
- OKTMO ID: 07620153051

Ryzdvyany (Russian: Рыздвяный) is an urban locality (an urban-type settlement) in Izobilnensky District of Stavropol Krai, Russia. Population: 7,710 (2010 census); 7,468 (2002 census); 6,284 (1989 Soviet census).
