= Lupa Roma FC =

Italian football club

Lupa Roma
- Full name: Lupa Roma Football Club S.r.l.
- Founded: 1974; 52 years ago as, S.S. L.V.P.A. Frascati; 2004; 22 years ago as, A.S.D. Lupa Frascati; 2013; 13 years ago as, Lupa Roma FC
- Dissolved: 2019
- Ground: Stadio Comunale 8 Settembre, Frascati, Italy
- Capacity: 2,554
- Chairman: Alberto Cerrai
- 2018–19: Serie D Group G, 19th of 20 (relegated)
Home colours	Away colours

Lupa Roma F.C. is an Italian former professional football club located in Rome. The club formerly headquartered in Frascati and then Tivoli.

== Predecessors ==
Società Sportiva L.V.P.A. Frascati (stands for Ludentes Vivendi Perdiscimus Artem) was a football club founded in 1974. The club then became A.C. Lupa Frascati.

In 2002, A.C. Lupa Frascati merged with A.S. Frascati G.I.O.C. as A.S.D. Frascati Lupa G.I.O.C.. The club won Eccellenza Lazio in 2003 and promoted to 2003–04 Serie D. However, the club was relegated in mid-2004.

That club was folded in 2004 by selling its sports title and became U.S.D. Tor di Quinto, named after Tor di Quinto of Rome. That club had a registration number 651,135. At the same time, another club named after Frascati was founded in Serie D, using the sports title of Cisco Calcio Roma. The swapping of sports title effectively made Lupa Frascati (or Frascati Lupa) "remained" in Serie D.

== History ==
=== A.S.D. Lupa Frascati ===
In 2004 due to the merger of Cisco Calcio Roma and A.S. Lodigiani as A.S. Cisco Lodigiani, a sports title in Serie D was vacated. It was sold and became A.S.D. Frascati Calcio, a phoenix club of A.S.D. Frascati Lupa G.I.O.C. The club has a registration number 651,284. A.S.D. Lupa Frascati added back the prefix Lupa officially in 2006, as well as dropping the suffix calcio (means football) in the same process.

In the 2008–09 season it was relegated from Serie D to Eccellenza Lazio.

In the 2011–12 season the team was promoted from Eccellenza Lazio group B to Serie D after winning inter-regional promotion play-offs.

The club changed its name and the headquarter from Frascati to Rome in 2013. In 2015, a minor club from Frascati renamed itself, which also naming after the original Lupa Frascati.

=== Lupa Roma ===
In the season 2013–14 the club moved to Axa district of Rome changing its name to A.S.D. Lupa Roma, and playing the home matches in nearby Stadio Pietro Desideri of Fiumicino. In the next season it was promoted to Lega Pro as Group G champions, changing its name again to Lupa Roma F.C. as a sign of return to the professional ranks after a 34-season absence. The team had to also move its home in Aprilia due to the Fiumicino field being unfit for professional league games, and the immediate lack of an available venue in Rome.

In 2016–17 season the club moved to Stadio Olindo Galli of Tivoli. The legal address of the club also moved to the same municipality of Greater Rome. In 2017–18 season, in Serie D, moved to Stadio Francesca Gianni of Rome and in 2018–19 moved to Stadio Montefiore of Rocca Priora. The club relegated at the end of 2018–19 Serie D season.

In 2019, the club dissolved its first team and focus on youth sector only.

== Colors and badge ==
Its colors are yellow red, light blue and white. Year 1974, the foundation of the original Lupa, as well as year 2013, when the club relocated to Rome, were on the badge of the club.

== Namesakes ==
Several clubs from Rome metropolitan area also named after Lupa in the past and at present.

From 2011 to 2013, a football club from Monterotondo, was known as Pol. Monterotondo Lupa.

In 2013, another club, A.S.D. Lupa Castelli Romani was founded in Frascati, by the relocation of A.S.D. Real T.B.M. Zagarolo from Zagarolo. However, that club was renamed to S.S. Racing Club Roma in 2016.

In 2015, a minor club in Frascati, A.S.D. Frascati, was renamed to A.S.D. Lupa Frascati. The registration number of that club was 921,320. In 2016, that club merged with A.S.D. G.I.O.C. Cocciano Frascati and became A.S.D. Frascati Calcio. It was renamed to Lupa Frascati A.S.D. again in 2018. The new registration number of that club was 945,129. As of 2019–20 season, that club was participating in Promozione Lazio Group D. It was reported that the club was chaired by Remo Buccella, a manager of the "original" Lupa Frascati in the 2000s. The club was promoted to Eccellenza Lazio in 2021.
