= SS Racing Club Roma =

Italian football club

Racing Roma
- Full name: Società Sportiva Racing Club Roma
- Founded: 2013 in Frascati
- Dissolved: 2017
- Ground: Stadio Casal del Marmo, Rome
- Capacity: 3,000
- Chairman: Alessandro Pezone
- 2016–17: Lega Pro Group A, 20th (relegated)
- Website: www.ssracingroma.it
Home colours	Away colours

Società Sportiva Racing Club Roma (or simply Racing Roma) was an Italian association football club located in Rome, Lazio. The club folded in 2017. The owner of Racing Club Roma, bought Fondi Calcio instead in 2017 and F.C. Aprilia in 2018.

== History ==
The club was founded in mid-2013, after A.S.D. Real T.B.M. Zagarolo transferred the seat and its sports title of Eccellenza Lazio to the city of Frascati, becoming A.S.D. Lupa Castelli Romani. In the same year Lupa Frascati moved to Rome.

In the 2013–14 season the club was promoted to Serie D. It was then promoted to Lega Pro in the 2014–15 Serie D season. They were then relegated again the following season.

In the 2016–17 season the club changed its name to S.S. Racing Club Roma, moved to Rome and was admitted to Lega Pro to fill the vacancies created.

== Colors and badge ==
Its colors are yellow and green.

== Stadium ==
Although the club was based in Frascati and representing Greater Rome, the club played in Centro d'Italia-Manlio Scopigno in Rieti, the capital of the province of the same name, in 2015–16 season. In 2016–17 season the club changed to play in Stadio Casal del Marmo, in Rome.
