= ASD Maccarese Calcio =

Italian football club

Maccarese Calcio
- Full name: Associazione Sportiva Dilettantistica Maccarese Calcio
- Short name: Maccarese
- Founded: 1934
- Dissolved: 2013 (relocated as A.S.D. Trastevere Calcio)
- League: N/A
- 2012–13: 15th, Promozione (Lazio Group A)

ASD Maccarese Calcio was an Italian football club headquartered in Maccarese, a frazione of Fiumicino, itself part of the Metropolitan City of Rome Capital (formerly Province of Rome). The club was also known as S.S. Maccarese until renamed to A.S. Giada Maccarese in 2002. In 2013, the club, known as A.S.D. Maccarese Calcio at that time, was relocated and renamed as A.S.D. Trastevere Calcio. However, since 2013, several namesake were founded as phoenix clubs of Maccarese, by the former chairman Dante Papili.

== History ==
Maccarese was founded in 1934 in the present day Maccarese frazione of Fiumicino comune. The comune was formed in 1992 from a split from Rome comune. Both Fiumicino (XXXVII) and Maccarese (Maccarese Sud, XLII and Maccarese Nord, XLIII) were previously separate zones of Circoscrizione XIV of Rome. The Italian Football Federation (FIGC) registration number of the club was 75,992.

In the 1990s, the club was known for signing future Serie A players Davide Moscardelli, who played for the team in Promozione Lazio league from 1997 to 2000 and then Eccellenza Lazio in 2000–01 season. The club received a windfall revenue in 2011 due to Moscardelli's debut in Serie A and a bonus mechanism of FIGC.

The club was renamed to A.S. Giada Maccarese in 2002. According to the club, Giada was in fact means Gia. Da., the initials of the Chairman Dante Papili and his brother Giancarlo Papili. Prefix dilettantistica (stands for amateur) and suffix calcio (stands for football) were added to the denomination some times later, as A.S.D. Giada Maccarese Calcio.

The club played in Eccellenza Lazio from 2000 to 2001 season to 2011–12 season. In the last season the club relegated. In 2012, the club also renamed to A.S.D. Maccarese Calcio.

In the single season as A.S.D. Maccarese Calcio, the club finished as the 15th in the group A of 2012–13 Promozione Lazio.

In 2013, A.S.D. Maccarese Calcio was folded after selling its sports title. The legal person of the club was relocated and renamed as A.S.D. Trastevere Calcio. However, a phoenix club of Maccarese was founded in the same year in the Serie D. Both "new" Maccarese and "new" Trastevere were folded in 2014, however, and replaced with namesakes.

== Phoenix clubs ==
=== Pol. Maccarese Giada ===
Pol. Maccarese Giada was a phoenix club of Maccarese since the 2013 relocation of A.S.D. Maccarese Calcio, formerly known as A.S.D. Giada Maccarese Calcio, from Maccarese to Trastevere.

Pol. Maccarese Giada was founded in 2013 by the relocation of Pol. Monterotondo Lupa from Monterotondo to Maccarese. According to the press release of the club, Dante Papili, former chairman of Giada Maccarese, also joined the board of Maccarese Giada. The club also affiliated to Parma.

In terms of city, the shuffle effectively made the team from Maccarese "promoted" from Promozione Lazio to Serie D, while the team from Trastevere "promoted" from Terza Categoria Rome to Promozione Lazio by using the spot of A.S.D. Maccarese Calcio. The team from Monterotondo retained in Eccellenza Lazio by using the spot of A.S.D. Città di Marino Calcio.

However, the new club was short-lived, the first team of Maccarese was expelled from the football league pyramid after only one season in 2013–14 Serie D.

=== Nuovo Maccarese / Fregene Maccarese ===
After the first team of Pol. Maccarese Giada was dissolved in 2014, another phoenix club was founded as A.S.D. Nuovo Maccarese Calcio 1934, by the renaming of A.S.D. Casalotti in 2017 (a namesake of Casalotti frazione of Rome). The registration number of the club was 916,147. It was reported that Dante Papili also served as the chairman of Nuovo Maccarese, as well as the new club affiliated to the existing youth team of Giada Maccarese. As of 2018–19 season, the first team of Nuovo Maccarese participated in Prima Categoria Group D. However, the team played the home matches in Stadio Aristide Paglialunga in Fregene frazione of Fiumicino. Another football club, S.F.F. Atletico, also based in Stadio Aristide Paglialunga.

In 2019, Nuovo Maccarese was renamed into A.S.D. Fregene Maccarese Calcio.

=== A.S.D. Giada Maccarese C.L. ===
A.S.D. Giada Maccarese C.L. is a youth academy based in Maccarese and chaired by Dante Papili. The registration number of the club was 945,128.

=== Others ===
In mid-2018, Pol. Pian due Torri (a namesake of Pian due Torri area of Rome), announced to move the team to Maccarese, which participated in 2018–19 Promozione Group A. Pian due Torri played their home matches in Stadio Emilio Darra in Maccarese frazione of Fiumicino. It was reported that Dante Papili also served as chairman of Pian due Torri, but rebutted by Pian due Torri official website.

== Honours ==
- Promozione Lazio (Group A)
  - Runners-up: 1999–2000
