= Izobilny, Stavropol Krai =

Town in Stavropol Krai, Russia

Izobilny Изобильный
- Town
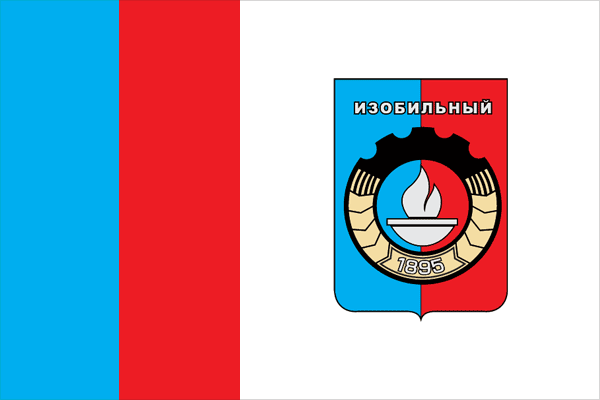
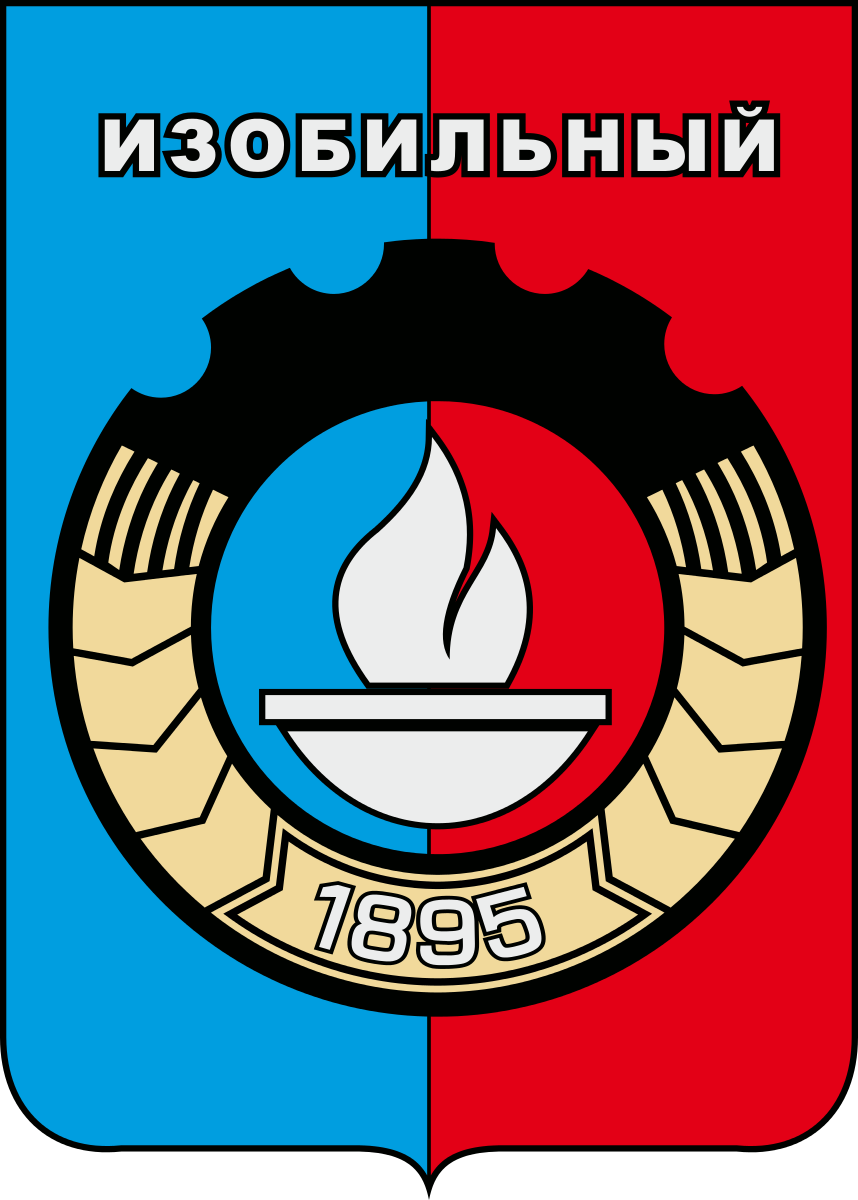
- Flag Coat of arms
- Interactive map of Izobilny
- Location of Izobilny Izobilny (Stavropol Krai)
- Coordinates: 45°22′N 41°43′E
- Country: Russia
- Federal subject: Stavropol Krai
- Administrative district: Izobilnensky District
- TownSelsoviet: Izobilny
- Founded: 1895
- Town status since: 1965
- Elevation: 200 m (660 ft)

Population (2010 Census)
  - Total: 40,555
  - Estimate (2023): 38,177 (−5.9%)

Administrative status
  - Capital of: Izobilnensky District, Town of Izobilny

Municipal status
  - Municipal district: Izobilnensky Municipal District
  - Urban settlement: Izobilny Urban Settlement
  - Capital of: Izobilnensky Municipal District, Izobilny Urban Settlement
- Time zone: UTC+3 (MSK)
- Postal code: 356140–356146
- Dialing code: +7 86545
- OKTMO ID: 07620101001
- Website: izobilniy.stavkray.ru

Izobilny (Russian: Изоби́льный) is a town and the administrative center of Izobilnensky District in Stavropol Krai, Russia, located 54 kilometers (34 mi) northwest of Stavropol, the administrative center of the krai. Population: 40,555 (2010 census); 38,926 (2002 census); 32,905 (1989 Soviet census).

It was previously known as Izobilnoye (until 1965).

== History ==
It was founded in 1895 due to the construction of a railroad and was known between 1935 and 1965 as Izobilnoye (Изобильное. It was granted town status and given its present name in 1965.

== Administrative and municipal status ==
Within the framework of administrative divisions, Izobilny serves as the administrative center of Izobilnensky District. As an administrative division, it is incorporated within Izobilnensky District as the Town of Izobilny. As a municipal division, the Town of Izobilny is incorporated within Izobilnensky Municipal District as Izobilny Urban Settlement.
