= APD Ribelle 1927 =

Italian football club

Ribelle
- Full name: Associazione Polisportiva Dilettantistica Ribelle 1927
- Founded: 1927; 99 years ago as, APD Ribelle 1927; 2017; 9 years ago as, Calcio Del Duca Ribelle
- Dissolved: 2020
- Ground: Stadio Massimo Sbrighi, Castiglione di Ravenna, Italy
- Capacity: 1,000
- 2016–17: Serie D/D, 15th (relegated after play-off)
Home colours	Away colours

Associazione Polisportiva Dilettantistica Ribelle 1927, commonly referred to as Ribelle, is an Italian football club based in Castiglione di Ravenna, a fraction of Ravenna, Emilia-Romagna.

== History ==
=== Foundation ===
The club was founded in 1927.

=== Serie D ===
In the season 2013–14 the team was promoted for the first time, from Eccellenza Emilia-Romagna/B to Serie D/D.

== Colours and badge ==
The team's colours are white and blue.

== Honours ==
- Eccellenza Emilia-Romagna/B: 2013–14
