= USD Zagarolo =

Italian football club

Zagarolo
- Full name: Unione Sportiva Dilettantistica Zagarolo
- Founded: 1968
- Dissolved: 2012
- Ground: Stadio Elio Mastrangeli, Zagarolo, Italy
- Capacity: 2,000
Home colours	Away colours

Unione Sportiva Dilettantistica Zagarolo was an Italian association football club located in Zagarolo, Lazio.

== History ==
The club was founded in 1968.

In the summer 2012, after the relegation to Eccellenza Lazio, the club was dissolved.

== Phoenix club ==
In 2012, to continue the football history of the town, Promozione Lazio club, A.S.D. Real Torbellamonaca 1970, of the homonymous frazione of Rome, was renamed to A.S.D. Real T.B.M. Zagarolo.

In mid-2013, after the promotion, the side transferred the seat and its sports title of Eccellenza Lazio to the city of Frascati, becoming A.S.D. Lupa Castelli Romani. Because of this transaction, Real TBM Zagarolo has effectively disappeared from the Italian football panorama.

== Colors and badge ==
Its colors were all dark red.
