= ASD Trastevere Calcio =

Italian football club

Trastevere
- Full name: Associazione Sportiva Dilettantistica Trastevere Calcio
Founded
2012
2013	(relocation of Maccarese)
2014	(relocation of Ciampino)
- Ground: Vittorio Bachelet stadium, Rome
- Head Coach (allenatore): Franco Cioci
- League: Serie D
- 2021–22: Serie D Group F, 2nd
- Website: www.trasteverecalcio.it

A.S.D. Trastevere Calcio is an Italian football club based in Monteverde Vecchio, a rione of Rome. The club was founded in 2013 by the relocation of A.S.D. Maccarese Calcio, and again in 2014 by the relocation of A.P.D. Ciampino, despite its namesake A.S.D. Trastevere F.C. playing in the 2012–13 Terza Categoria Rome season. As of the 2022–23 season, Trastevere was playing in Serie D.

== History ==
=== A.S.D. Trastevere F.C. ===
A.S.D. Trastevere F.C. was founded in 2012 as a homage to the historical team of the area, which was founded in 1909. The area also consisted of Francesco Totti's youth club Santa Maria in Trastevere (SMIT, namesake of Santa Maria in Trastevere), which was folded circa 1987.

A.S.D. Trastevere F.C. finished 5th in the 2012–13 Terza Categoria Rome Group C, the 10th and/or the lowest level of the Italian football league pyramid.

=== A.S.D. Trastevere Calcio ===
A.S.D. Trastevere Calcio was founded in 2013 by using the sports title of A.S.D. Maccarese Calcio. Another namesake of Maccarese was founded in 2013 as Pol. Maccarese Giada. In the first season, Trastevere finished as the 8th of 2013–14 Promozione Lazio Group C.

In 2014, the club buying the promotion again, which saw the relocation of A.P.D. Ciampino from Ciampino to Trastevere, as well as the renaming of the year 2013 Trastevere as A.S.D. Guardia di Finanza Calcio, a namesake of Guardia di Finanza. That club became A.S. Grifone Gialloverde in 2016. Ciampino also headquartered another team, Pol. Città di Ciampino.

Trastevere won 2014–15 Eccellenza Lazio season and promoted to 2015–16 Serie D.

The club finished as runners-up of the 2020–21 Serie D Group E.

== See also ==
- Cisco Roma: another Rome based team that had reached Serie C
