= Eccellenza Lazio =

- Organising body: Lega Nazionale Dilettanti
- Founded: 1991
- Country: Italy
- Confederation: UEFA
- Divisions: 2
- Number of clubs: 36
- Promotion to: Serie D
- Relegation to: Promozione Lazio
- League cup: Coppa Italia Dilettanti
- Current champions: Valmontone (Group A); UniPomezia (Group B) (2024–25)
- Most championships: Ferentino (3 titles)
- Website: www.lnd.it

Eccellenza Lazio is the regional Eccellenza football division for clubs in Lazio, Italy. It is competed amongst 36 teams, in two different groups (A and B). The winners of the Groups are promoted to Serie D. The club who finishes second also have the chance to gain promotion, they are entered into a national play-off which consists of two rounds.

== Champions ==
Here are the past champions of the Lazio Eccellenza, organised into their respective group.

=== Group A ===
- 1991–92 Civita Castellana
- 1992–93 Fiumicino
- 1993–94 Civitavecchia Calcio
- 1994–95 Guidonia
- 1995–96 Fiumicino
- 1996–97 Ladispoli
- 1997–98 Fregene
- 1998–99 Fortitudo Nepi
- 1999–2000 Monterotondo
- 2000–01 Albalonga
- 2001–02 Cisco Collatino
- 2002–03 Ostia Mare
- 2003–04 Sorianese
- 2004–05 Pisoniano
- 2005–06 Anziolavinio
- 2006–07 Bassano Romano
- 2007–08 Civitavecchia Calcio
- 2008–09 Pomezia Calcio
- 2009–10 Fidene
- 2010–11 Palestrina
- 2011–12 Ostia Mare
- 2012–13 Santa Maria delle Mole
- 2013–14 Viterbese
- 2014–15 Albalonga
- 2015–16 Monterosi
- 2016–17 S.F.F. Atletico
- 2017–18 Vis Artena
- 2018–19 Team Nuova Florida
- 2019–20 Montespaccato
- 2020–21 Real Monterotondo Scalo
- 2021–22 Pomezia
- 2022–23 Anzio
- 2023–24 Rieti
- 2024–25 Valmonte

=== Group B ===
- 1991–92 Cynthia Genzano
- 1992–93 Ferentino
- 1993–94 Ceccano
- 1994–95 Vis Velletri
- 1995–96 Terracina
- 1996–97 Real Piedimonte
- 1997–98 La Setina Sezze
- 1998–99 Lanuvio Campoleone
- 1999–2000 Aprilia
- 2000–01 Ferentino
- 2001–02 Anagni Fontana
- 2002–03 Frascati Lupa G.I.O.C.
- 2003–04 Ferentino
- 2004–05 Cassino
- 2005–06 Morolo
- 2006–07 Lupa Frascati
- 2007–08 Pol. Gaeta
- 2008–09 Virtus Latina
- 2009–10 Zagarolo
- 2010–11 Sora
- 2011–12 San Cesareo
- 2012–13 Monterotondo Lupa
- 2013–14 Lupa Castelli Romani
- 2014–15 Trastevere
- 2015–16 Città di Ciampino
- 2016–17 Cassino
- 2017–18 Città di Anagni
- 2018–19 Pro Calcio Tor Sapienza
- 2019–20 Insieme Ausonia
- 2020–21 Unipomezia
- 2021–22 Tivoli
- 2022–23 Sora
- 2023–24 Terracina
- 2024–25 UniPomezia

=== Group C ===
- 2020–21 Tivoli
- 2021–22 Lupa Frascati A.S.D.
