= Izobilnensky District =

Izobilnensky District Изобильненский район (Russian)
- District
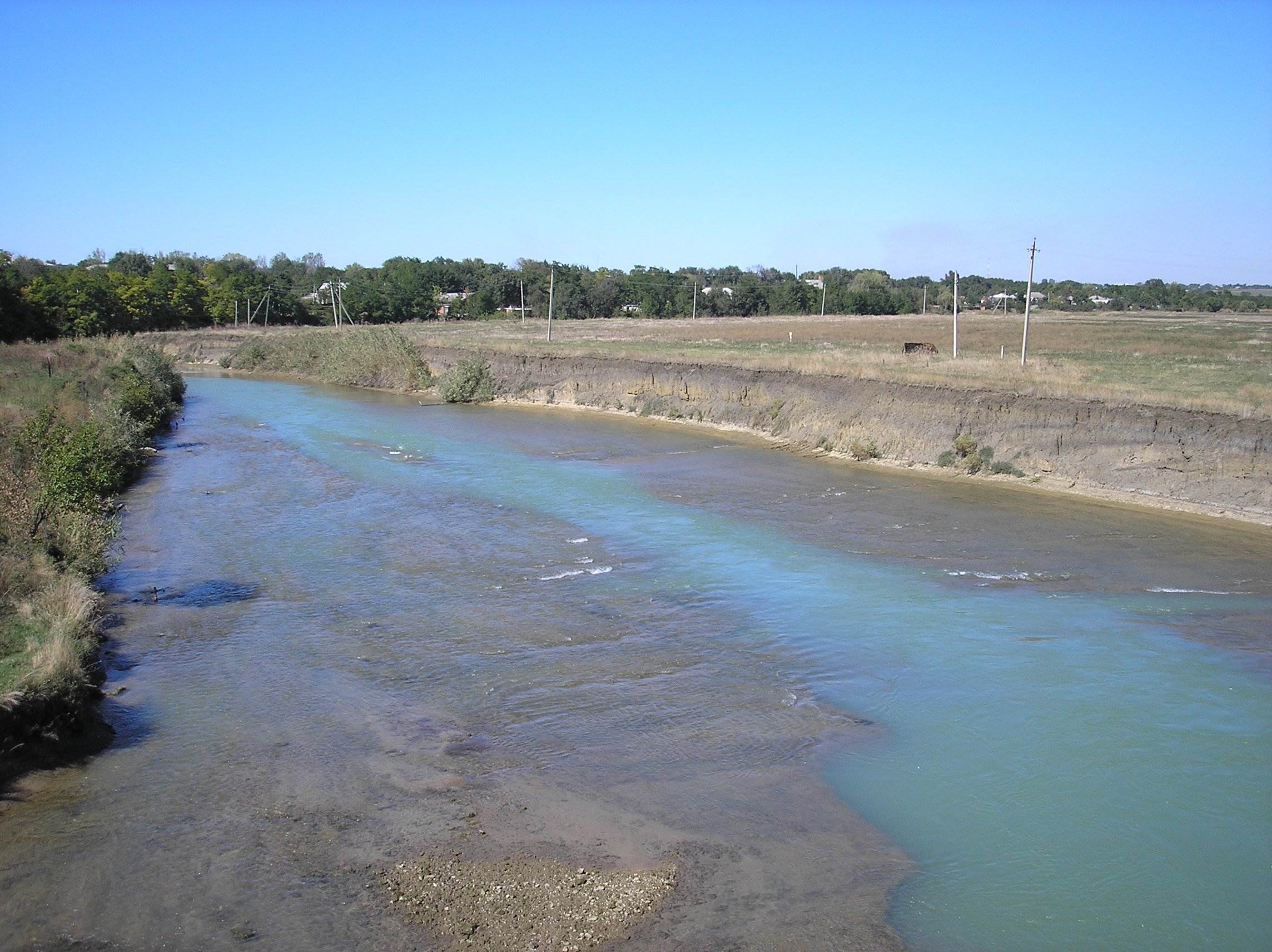
- The Yegorlyk River near the stanitsa of Novotroitskaya in Izobilnensky District

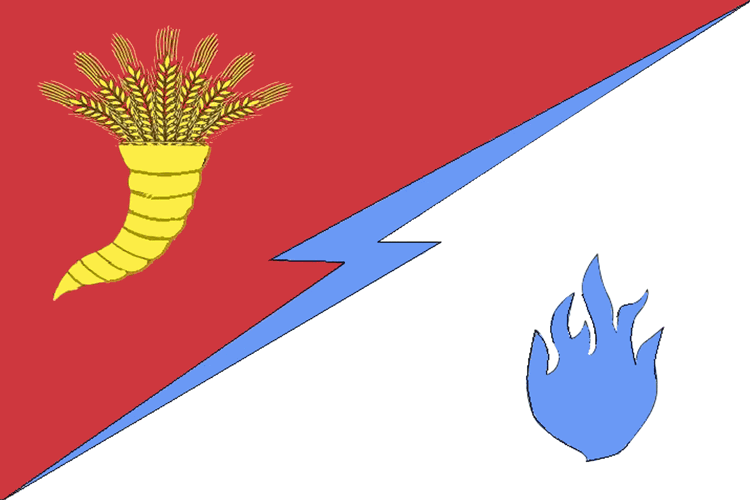
- Flag Coat of arms
- Location of Izobilnensky District in Stavropol Krai
- Coordinates: 45°22′N 41°43′E
- Country: Russia
- Federal subject: Stavropol Krai
- Established: 2 June 1924
- Administrative center: Izobilny

Area
  - Total: 1,935 km^{2} (747 sq mi)

Population (2010 Census)
  - Total: 103,635
  - Density: 53.56/km^{2} (138.7/sq mi)
  - Urban: 58.3%
  - Rural: 41.7%

Administrative structure
  - Administrative divisions: 1 Towns, 2 Settlements, 7 Selsoviets
  - Inhabited localities: 1 cities/towns, 2 urban-type settlements, 22 rural localities

Municipal structure
  - Municipally incorporated as: Izobilnensky Municipal District
  - Municipal divisions: 3 urban settlements, 12 rural settlements
- Time zone: UTC+3 (MSK)
- OKTMO ID: 07620000
- Website: http://www.izobadmin.ru

Izobilnensky District (Russian: Изоби́льненский райо́н) is an administrative district (raion), one of the twenty-six in Stavropol Krai, Russia. Municipally, it is incorporated as Izobilnensky Municipal District. It is located in the west of the krai. The area of the district is 1,935 square kilometers (747 sq mi). Its administrative center is the town of Izobilny. Population: 103,635 (2010 census); 101,980 (2002 Census); 87,036 (1989 Census). The population of Izobilny accounts for 39.1% of the district's total population.
