= Filippo =

- Pronunciation: Italian: [fiˈlippo]
- Gender: Male

Origin
- Origin: Italian
- Meaning: Friend of horses
- Region of origin: Italy

Other names
- Related names: Philip

Filippo is an Italian male given name, which is the equivalent of the English name Philip, from the Greek Philippos, meaning "horse lover". The female variant is Filippa. The name may refer to:

- Filippo I Colonna (1611–1639), Italian nobleman
- Filippo II Colonna (1663–1714), Italian noblemen
- Filippo Abbiati (1640–1715), Italian painter
- Filippo Baldinucci (1624–1697), Italian historian
- Filippo Brunelleschi (1377–1446), Italian architect
- Filippo Carli (1876–1938), Italian sociologist
- Filippo Castagna (1765–1830), Maltese politician
- Filippo Ciampanelli (born 1978), Italian Roman Catholic prelate and diplomat of the Holy See
- Filippo Coarelli (born 1936), Italian archaeologist
- Filippo Coletti (1811–1894), Italian singer
- Filippo di Piero Strozzi (1541–1582), French general
- Filippo Salvatore Gilii (1721–1789), Italian priest and linguist
- Filippo Grandi (born 1957), Italian diplomat
- Filippo Illuminato (1930–1943), Italian partisan, recipient of the Gold Medal of Military Valour
- Filippo Inzaghi (born 1973), Italian football player and manager
- Filippo Lippi (1406–1469), Italian painter
- Filippo Lombardi (footballer) (born 1990), Italian footballer
- Filippo Lombardi (politician) (born 1956), Swiss politician
- Filippo Lussana (1820–1897), Italian doctor
- Filippo Magnini (born 1982), Italian swimmer
- Filippo Mannucci (born 1974), Italian rower
- Filippo Maria Fanti (born 1995), know professionally as Irama, Italian singer-songwriter and rapper
- Filippo Marinetti (1876–1944), Italian writer
- Filippo Nicolini (died 1775), Italian impresario
- Filippo Nigro (born 1970), Italian actor
- Filippo Palizzi (1818–1899), Italian painter
- Filippo Parlatore (1816–1877), Italian botanist
- Filippo Pelati (born 2007), Italian synchronised swimmer
- Filippo Raguzzini (1690–1771), Italian architect
- Filippo Rusuti (1255–1325), Italian painter
- Filippo Sacco, later known as John Roselli
- Filippo Scelzo (1900–1980), Italian actor
- Filippo Scerra (born 1978), Italian politician
- Filippo Severoli (1762–1822), Italian general
- Filippo Sorcinelli (born 1975), Italian fashion designer
- Filippo Timi (born 1974), Italian actor
- Filippo Turati (1857–1932), Italian politician

== See also ==
- Flippo
- Pippo (disambiguation)
- Filippino (given name), the diminutive form
