= 2011–12 Bologna FC 1909 season =

Bologna
2011–12 season
- President: Albano Guaraldi
- Manager: Pierpaolo Bisoli (until 4 October 2011); Stefano Pioli
- Stadium: Stadio Renato Dall'Ara
- Serie A: 9th
- Coppa Italia: Round of 16
- Top goalscorer: Marco Di Vaio (10)
- Highest home attendance: 30,321 vs Juventus (7 March 2012)
- Lowest home attendance: 1,432 vs Crotone (23 November 2011)
| Home colours | Away colours | Third colours |

The 2011–12 season was Bologna Football Club's 102nd in existence and 4th consecutive season in the top flight of Italian football.

== Season review ==
Having parted ways with Alberto Malesani during the offseason, Bologna began the season with a new head coach, Pierpaolo Bisoli. Under Bisoli, Bologna started the Serie A season very poorly. They managed just 1 point from their first five league games, while scoring only 2 goals and conceding 10. Following the 2–0 defeat to Udinese, Bologna sacked Bisoli after five games in charge and replaced him with Stefano Pioli. Pioli took over the club, himself having already been fired by Palermo earlier in the season.

In Pioli's debut, Bologna picked up their first win of the season with a 2–0 victory away to Novara. They continued to find their footing in the league winning three of the first four games under their new manager. Bologna finished the season in ninth place, earning Stefano Pioli a contract extension. The club was led by their captain Marco Di Vaio, who scored 10 goals for the club and formed a lethal attacking trident alongside Alessandro Diamanti and Gastón Ramírez. Prior to the end of the season, Di Vaio announced it would be his last at Serie A, as he bid farewell to Bologna in order to finish his career with the Montreal Impact of Major League Soccer (MLS).

== Kit ==
The kits for the 2011–12 season were made by Macron. The home kit features the traditional red and blue stripes with yellow inserts. The home shorts are white with red and blue details. The away kit is a white shirt with red and blue details, paired with blue shorts. The third kit is sky blue with red and blue details, a tribute to Uruguay, as a way to celebrate the historic "twinning" between Bologna and the South American country that has provided the Rossoblù many foreign players in its history. The main sponsor for the season's shirts is NGM Mobile, with Serenissima Ceramica also sponsoring the home kits and Manifatture Ceramiche on the away uniforms.

== Players ==
| No. | Name | Nationality | Position | Date of Birth (Age) | Signed from | Notes |
Goalkeepers
| 1 | Jean-François Gillet | (Belgium) | GK | 31 May 1979 (age 46) | Bari | |
| 25 | Federico Agliardi | (Italy) | GK | 11 February 1983 (age 43) | Padova | |
| 32 | Dejan Stojanović | (North Macedonia) | GK | 19 July 1993 (age 32) | (Austria) FC Lustenau | |
| 44 | Filippo Lombardi | (Italy) | GK | 22 April 1990 (age 36) | Alma Fano | |
Defenders
| 3 | Archimede Morleo | (Italy) | LB | 26 September 1983 (age 42) | Crotone | |
| 5 | Mikael Antonsson | (Sweden) | CB | 31 May 1981 (age 44) | (Denmark) Copenhagen | |
| 8 | György Garics | (Austria) | RB | 6 March 1984 (age 42) | Atalanta | |
| 19 | Luigi Vitale | (Italy) | LB | 5 October 1987 (age 38) | Napoli | on loan from Napoli |
| 21 | Nicolò Cherubin | (Italy) | LB | 2 December 1986 (age 39) | Cittadella | |
| 22 | Cesare Rickler | (Italy) | CB | 18 March 1987 (age 39) | Chievo | |
| 43 | Frederik Sørensen | (Denmark) | CB | 14 April 1992 (age 34) | Juventus | transferred in from Juventus |
| 48 | Matteo Rubin | (Italy) | LB | 9 July 1987 (age 38) | Torino | on loan from Torino |
| 51 | Simone Loria | (Italy) | CB | 28 October 1976 (age 49) | Roma | |
| 75 | José Ángel Crespo | (Spain) | RB | 9 February 1987 (age 39) | Padova | |
| 84 | Andrea Raggi | (Italy) | RB | 24 June 1984 (age 41) | Palermo | |
| 90 | Daniele Portanova | (Italy) | CB | 17 December 1978 (age 47) | Siena | Vice-captain |
Midfielders
| 4 | Rene Krhin | (Slovenia) | CM | 21 May 1990 (age 36) | Internazionale | |
| 6 | Saphir Taïder | (France) | MF | 29 February 1992 (age 34) | (France) Grenoble | |
| 10 | Gastón Ramírez | (Uruguay) | AM | 2 December 1990 (age 35) | (Uruguay) Peñarol | |
| 13 | Nico Pulzetti | (Italy) | DM | 13 February 1984 (age 42) | Livorno | |
| 15 | Diego Pérez | (Uruguay) | DM | 18 May 1980 (age 46) | (France) Monaco | |
| 16 | Federico Casarini | (Italy) | CM | 7 August 1989 (age 36) | Youth team | |
| 23 | Alessandro Diamanti | (Italy) | AM | 2 May 1983 (age 43) | Brescia | |
| 26 | Gaby Mudingayi | (Belgium) | CM | 1 October 1981 (age 44) | Lazio | |
| 33 | Panagiotis Kone | (Greece) | MF | 26 July 1987 (age 38) | Brescia | on loan from Brescia |
Forwards
| 9 | Marco Di Vaio | (Italy) | ST | 15 July 1976 (age 49) | Genoa | Captain |
| 17 | Daniele Vantaggiato | (Italy) | ST | 10 October 1984 (age 41) | Padova | on loan from Padova |
| 35 | Daniele Paponi | (Italy) | ST | 16 April 1988 (age 38) | Parma | |
| 77 | Henry Giménez | (Uruguay) | ST | 13 March 1986 (age 40) | (Uruguay) River Plate | |
| 78 | Ishak Belfodil | (France) | ST | 12 January 1992 (age 34) | (France) Lyon | on loan from Lyon |
| 99 | Robert Acquafresca | (Italy) | ST | 11 September 1987 (age 38) | Genoa | on loan from Genoa |
Players transferred during the season
| 11 | Manuel Gavilán | (Spain) | ST | 12 July 1991 (age 34) | Youth team | on loan to Piacenza |
| 20 | Federico Rodríguez | (Uruguay) | ST | 3 April 1991 (age 35) | Genoa | on loan to Piacenza |
| 52 | Riccardo Pasi | (Italy) | MF | 27 August 1990 (age 35) | Parma | on loan to Chiasso |
| 88 | Massimo Coda | (Italy) | ST | 10 November 1988 (age 37) | Treviso | on loan to Siracusa |

== Statistics ==
=== Appearances and goals ===
| No. | Pos. | Name | League | | Coppa Italia | | Total | | Discipline | |
| No. | Pos. | Name | Apps | Goals | Apps | Goals | Apps | Goals | Yellow card | Red card |
|---|---|---|---|---|---|---|---|---|---|---|
| 1 | GK | (Belgium) Jean-François Gillet | 29 | 0 | 1 | 0 | 30 | 0 | 0 | 0 |
| 3 | DF | (Italy) Archimede Morleo | 25(4) | 0 | 1(1) | 0 | 26(5) | 0 | 5 | 2 |
| 4 | MF | (Slovenia) Rene Krhin | 4(3) | 1 | 1(1) | 0 | 5(4) | 1 | 2 | 0 |
| 5 | DF | (Sweden) Mikael Antonsson | 22(2) | 0 | 0 | 0 | 22(2) | 0 | 1 | 0 |
| 6 | MF | (France) Saphir Taïder | 9(5) | 0 | 2 | 0 | 11(5) | 0 | 4 | 0 |
| 7 | FW | (Italy) Francesco Della Rocca | 0 | 0 | 0(1) | 1 | 0(1) | 1 | 0 | 0 |
| 8 | DF | (Austria) György Garics | 12(6) | 1 | 2 | 0 | 14(6) | 1 | 0 | 0 |
| 9 | FW | (Italy) Marco Di Vaio | 32(5) | 10 | 1 | 0 | 33(5) | 10 | 5 | 0 |
| 10 | MF | (Uruguay) Gastón Ramírez | 28(5) | 8 | 0 | 0 | 28(5) | 8 | 8 | 0 |
| 13 | MF | (Italy) Nico Pulzetti | 16(9) | 0 | 2 | 0 | 18(9) | 0 | 6 | 0 |
| 15 | MF | (Uruguay) Diego Pérez | 27(1) | 0 | 2 | 0 | 29(1) | 0 | 15 | 0 |
| 16 | MF | (Italy) Federico Casarini | 8(3) | 0 | 2 | 0 | 10(3) | 0 | 2 | 0 |
| 17 | FW | (Italy) Daniele Vantaggiato | 0(2) | 0 | 2 | 1 | 2(2) | 1 | 0 | 0 |
| 19 | MF | (Italy) Luigi Vitale | 0 | 0 | 0 | 0 | 0 | 0 | 0 | 0 |
| 21 | DF | (Italy) Nicolò Cherubin | 14(7) | 1 | 2 | 0 | 16(7) | 1 | 6 | 0 |
| 22 | DF | (Italy) Cesare Rickler | 0 | 0 | 1 | 0 | 1 | 0 | 0 | 1 |
| 23 | MF | (Italy) Alessandro Diamanti | 27(3) | 7 | 2 | 1 | 29(3) | 8 | 6 | 0 |
| 25 | GK | (Italy) Federico Agliardi | 9(1) | 0 | 2 | 0 | 11(1) | 0 | 0 | 0 |
| 26 | MF | (Belgium) Gaby Mudingayi | 33(1) | 0 | 1(1) | 0 | 34(2) | 0 | 11 | 0 |
| 32 | GK | (North Macedonia) Dejan Stojanović | 0 | 0 | 0 | 0 | 0 | 0 | 0 | 0 |
| 33 | MF | (Greece) Panagiotis Kone | 18(13) | 1 | 0 | 0 | 18(13) | 1 | 7 | 0 |
| 35 | FW | (Italy) Daniele Paponi | 0(1) | 0 | 0(3) | 1 | 0(4) | 1 | 0 | 0 |
| 43 | DF | (Denmark) Frederik Sørensen | 1(1) | 1 | 0 | 0 | 1(1) | 1 | 1 | 0 |
| 44 | GK | (Italy) Filippo Lombardi | 0 | 0 | 0 | 0 | 0 | 0 | 0 | 0 |
| 48 | DF | (Italy) Matteo Rubin | 12(2) | 1 | 2 | 0 | 14(2) | 1 | 3 | 0 |
| 51 | DF | (Italy) Simone Loria | 7(2) | 1 | 1 | 0 | 8(2) | 1 | 3 | 0 |
| 75 | DF | (Spain) José Ángel Crespo | 3(4) | 0 | 2 | 0 | 5(4) | 0 | 0 | 0 |
| 77 | FW | (Uruguay) Henry Damián Giménez | 2(12) | 0 | 2(1) | 1 | 4(13) | 1 | 2 | 0 |
| 78 | FW | (France) Ishak Belfodil | 1(7) | 0 | 0 | 0 | 1(7) | 0 | 1 | 0 |
| 84 | DF | (Italy) Andrea Raggi | 31 | 0 | 1 | 1 | 32 | 1 | 4 | 0 |
| 90 | DF | (Italy) Daniele Portanova | 34 | 3 | 1 | 1 | 35 | 4 | 8 | 1 |
| 99 | FW | (Italy) Robert Acquafresca | 17(15) | 5 | 2 | 0 | 19(15) | 5 | 3 | 0 |
| - | MF | (Italy) Riccardo Casini | 0 | 0 | 0(1) | 0 | 0(1) | 0 | 0 | 0 |

Last updated: 29 May 2012
Source: Statistics from legaseriea.it

=== Top scorers ===
Includes all competitive matches. The list is sorted by shirt number when total goals are equal.

| R | No. | Pos | Nat | Name | Serie A | Coppa Italia | Total |
|---|---|---|---|---|---|---|---|
| 1 | 9 | FW | (Italy) | Marco Di Vaio | 10 | 0 | 10 |
| 2 | 10 | AM | (Uruguay) | Gastón Ramírez | 8 | 0 | 8 |
| = | 23 | AM | (Italy) | Alessandro Diamanti | 7 | 1 | 8 |
| 4 | 99 | FW | (Italy) | Robert Acquafresca | 5 | 0 | 5 |
| 5 | 90 | CB | (Italy) | Daniele Portanova | 3 | 1 | 4 |

Last updated: 29 May 2012
Source: Statistics from legaseriea.it

=== Most appearances ===
Includes all competitive matches.

| R | No. | Pos | Nat | Name | Serie A | Coppa Italia | Total |
|---|---|---|---|---|---|---|---|
| 1 | 9 | FW | (Italy) | Marco Di Vaio | 37 | 1 | 38 |
| 2 | 26 | CM | (Belgium) | Gaby Mudingayi | 34 | 2 | 36 |
| 3 | 90 | CB | (Italy) | Daniele Portanova | 34 | 1 | 35 |
| 4 | 99 | FW | (Italy) | Robert Acquafresca | 32 | 2 | 34 |
| 5 | 10 | AM | (Uruguay) | Gastón Ramírez | 33 | 0 | 33 |

Last updated: 29 May 2012
Source: Statistics from legaseriea.it

== Club ==
Coaching staff

| Position | Staff |
|---|---|
| Head coach | (Italy) Pierpaolo Bisoli (until 4 October 2011) (Italy) Stefano Pioli |
| Assistant coach | (Italy) Giancomo Murelli |
| Technical Collaborator | (Italy) Michele Tardioli (until 4 October 2011) (Italy) Davide Lucarelli |
| Goalkeepers' coach | (Italy) Franco Paleari (until 4 October 2011) (Italy) Graziano Vinti |
| Athletic coach | (Italy) Riccardo Ragnacci (until 4 October 2011) (Italy) Matteo Osti (Italy) Francesco Perondi |

Last updated: May 2012
Source: Staff Tecnico

Medical staff

| Position | Staff |
|---|---|
| Sanitary manager | (Italy) Gianni Nanni |
| Doctors | (Italy) Giovanbattista Sisca (Italy) Luca Bini |
| Physiotherapists | (Italy) Luca Ghelli (Italy) Luca Govoni (Italy) Carmelo Sposato |

Last updated: May 2012
Source: Staff Tecnico

Other information

| Chairman | (Italy) Albano Guaraldi |
| Vice Chairman | (Italy) Maurizio Setti |
| Honorary Chairman | (Italy) Gianni Morandi |
| Chief Executive Officer Chief Financial Officer | (Italy) Alessandro Gabrieli |
| General Manager | (Italy) Roberto Zanzi |
| Directors | (Italy) Marco Pavignani (Italy) Marco Scapoli (Italy) Riccardo Yien (Italy) Gianluigi Serafini (Italy) Paolo Romani (Italy) Giulio Romagnoli (Italy) Gian Paolo Rimondi (Italy) Mauro Galavotti (Italy) Maurizio Ferrari |
| Ground (capacity and dimensions) | Stadio Renato Dall'Ara (38,279 / 105x68 meters) |

Updated to match played July 2011
Source: Organigrammi

== Competitions ==
=== Overall ===
| Competition | Started round | Final position / round | First match | Last match |
|---|---|---|---|---|
| Serie A | — | 9th | 11 September 2011 | 13 May 2012 |
| Coppa Italia | Third round | Round of 16 | 21 August 2011 | 8 December 2011 |

Updated to match played 20 May 2012
Source: Competitions

=== Serie A ===
==== League table ====
| Pos | Team | Pld | W | D | L | GF | GA | GD | Pts |
|---|---|---|---|---|---|---|---|---|---|
| 7 | Roma | 38 | 16 | 8 | 14 | 60 | 54 | +6 | 56 (Note: Roma finished ahead of Parma on head–to–head away goals scored: Parma 0–1 Roma, Roma 1–0 Parma.) |
| 8 | Parma | 38 | 15 | 11 | 12 | 54 | 53 | +1 | 56 |
| 9 | Bologna | 38 | 13 | 12 | 13 | 41 | 43 | −2 | 51 |
| 10 | Chievo | 38 | 12 | 13 | 13 | 35 | 45 | −10 | 49 |
| 11 | Catania | 38 | 11 | 15 | 12 | 47 | 52 | −5 | 48 |

Source: Lega Serie A
Rules for classification: 1) points; 2) head-to-head points; 3) head-to-head goal difference; 4) head-to-head goals scored; 5) goal difference; 6) number of goals scored

==== Results summary ====
| Overall | | | | | | | | Home | | | | | | Away | | | | | |
| Pld | W | D | L | GF | GA | GD | Pts | W | D | L | GF | GA | GD | W | D | L | GF | GA | GD |
|---|---|---|---|---|---|---|---|---|---|---|---|---|---|---|---|---|---|---|---|
| 38 | 13 | 12 | 13 | 41 | 43 | −2 | 51 | 8 | 4 | 7 | 23 | 24 | −1 | 5 | 8 | 6 | 18 | 19 | −1 |

Last updated: 13 May 2012.
Source: Lega Serie A – Standings

==== Results by round ====
| Round | 1 | 2 | 3 | 4 | 5 | 6 | 7 | 8 | 9 | 10 | 11 | 12 | 13 | 14 | 15 | 16 | 17 | 18 | 19 | 20 | 21 | 22 | 23 | 24 | 25 | 26 | 27 | 28 | 29 | 30 | 31 | 32 | 33 | 34 | 35 | 36 | 37 | 38 |
|---|---|---|---|---|---|---|---|---|---|---|---|---|---|---|---|---|---|---|---|---|---|---|---|---|---|---|---|---|---|---|---|---|---|---|---|---|---|---|
| Ground | H | A | H | A | H | A | A | H | A | H | A | H | A | H | H | A | H | A | H | A | H | A | H | A | H | H | A | H | A | H | A | H | A | A | H | A | H | A |
| Result | L | L | L | D | L | L | W | L | W | W | D | D | D | W | D | L | W | D | D | D | W | D | D | W | L | W | W | D | L | L | D | W | D | D | W | W | W | L |
| Position | 17 | 19 | 19 | 19 | 20 | 18 | 18 | 17 | 14 | 16 | 17 | 17 | 17 | 16 | 16 | 17 | 17 | 16 | 16 | 16 | 16 | 16 | 17 | 15 | 16 | 13 | 9 | 9 | 10 | 13 | 14 | 12 | 12 | 13 | 11 | 9 | 9 | 9 |

Updated to match(es) played on 13 May 2012. Source: Competitive Matches
A = Away; H = Home; W = Win; D = Draw; L = Loss
Notes: Round 1 was played between rounds 16 and 17, on 20 and 21 December 2011, Round 33 was played between rounds 34 and 35, on 24 and 25 April 2012.

==== Matches ====
The fixtures for the 2011–12 Serie A season were announced by the Lega Serie A on 27 July.

| 11 September 2011 2 | Fiorentina | 2–0 | Bologna | Florence |
| 15:00 CEST (UTC+02) | Gilardino 20'; Cerci 47'; Lazzari (yellow card) 74' | Report | Portanova (yellow card) 29' | Stadium: Stadio Artemio Franchi; Attendance: 20,040; Referee: Marco Guida |

| 18 September 2011 3 | Bologna | 0–2 | Lecce | Bologna |
| 15:00 CEST (UTC+02) | Morleo (yellow card) 34'; Pérez (yellow card) 42'; Mudingayi (yellow card) 49' | Report | Giacomazzi 37'; Grossmüller 60'; Piatti (yellow card) 63'; Cuadrado (yellow card) 89' | Stadium: Stadio Renato Dall'Ara; Attendance: 15,353; Referee: Carmine Russo |

| 21 September 2011 4 | Juventus | 1–1 | Bologna | Turin |
| 20:45 CEST (UTC+02) | Pepe (yellow card) 13'; Vučinić 29', (yellow card) 24' (yellow-red card) 45+2'; Lichtsteiner (yellow card) 72'; Bonucci (yellow card) 90+5' | Report | Kone (yellow card) 29'; Pérez (yellow card) 42'; Portanova 52', (yellow card) 90+5'; Casarini (yellow card) 58'; Pulzetti (yellow card) 64' | Stadium: Juventus Stadium; Attendance: 35,679; Referee: Gabriele Gava |

| 24 September 2011 5 | Bologna | 1–3 | Internazionale | Bologna |
| 18:00 CEST (UTC+02) | Pérez (yellow card) 61'; Diamanti 66' (pen.); Morleo (red card) 80'; Krhin (yellow card) 86' | Report | Coutinho (yellow card) 35'; Pazzini 39'; Milito 81' (pen.); Lúcio 87' | Stadium: Stadio Renato Dall'Ara; Attendance: 22,467; Referee: Paolo Tagliavento |

| 2 October 2011 6 | Udinese | 2–0 | Bologna | Udine |
| 15:00 CEST (UTC+02) | Danilo (yellow card) 24'; Benatia 29'; Di Natale 72' (pen.) | Report | Mudingayi (yellow card) 31'; Loria (yellow card) 39'; Pérez (yellow card) 71' | Stadium: Stadio Friuli; Attendance: 16,338; Referee: Sebastiano Peruzzo |

| 16 October 2011 7 | Novara | 0–2 | Bologna | Novara |
| 15:00 CEST (UTC+02) | Radovanović (yellow card) 59' | Report | Ramírez 45+4'; Kone (yellow card) 59'; Acquafresca 63'; Raggi (yellow card) 65' | Stadium: Stadio Silvio Piola, Attendance: 10,033; Referee: Daniele Doveri |

| 23 October 2011 8 | Bologna | 0–2 | Lazio | Bologna |
| 20:45 CEST (UTC+02) | Cherubin (yellow card) 22'; Ramírez (yellow card) 71'; Pulzetti (yellow card) 82'; Giménez (yellow card) 85' | Report | Acquafresca 23' (o.g.); Dias (yellow card) 34'; Biava (yellow card) 44'; Lulić 48'; Lulić (yellow card) 87' | Stadium: Stadio Renato Dall'Ara; Attendance: 17,851; Referee: Antonio Damato |

| 26 October 2011 9 | Chievo | 0–1 | Bologna | Verona |
| 20:45 CEST (UTC+02) | | Report | Portanova (yellow card) 41'; Acquafresca 53'; Pérez (yellow card) 63'; Giménez (yellow card) 77' | Stadium: Stadio Marc'Antonio Bentegodi; Attendance: 8,300; Referee: Gianluca Rocchi |

| 30 October 2011 10 | Bologna | 3–1 | Atalanta | Bologna |
| 15:00 CET (UTC+01) | Portanova (yellow card) 41'; Di Vaio 45+3' (pen.); Ramírez 48'; Mudingayi (yellow card) 52'; Loria 68' | Report | Denis 7', (yellow card) 31'; Bonaventura (yellow card) 24'; Padoin (yellow card) 51' | Stadium: Stadio Renato Dall'Ara; Attendance: 17,850; Referee: Mauro Bergonzi |

| 5 November 2011 11 | Palermo | 3–1 | Bologna | Palermo |
| 18:00 CET (UTC+01) | Zahavi 13'; Migliaccio (yellow card) 36'; Silvestre 52'; Balzaretti (yellow card) 72'; Iličić 74'; Aguirregaray (yellow card) 89' | Report | Pérez (yellow card) 34'; Morleo (yellow card) 44'; Ramírez 87' | Stadium: Stadio Renzo Barbera; Attendance: 18,507; Referee: Daniele Orsato |

| 20 November 2011 12 | Bologna | 0–1 | Cesena | Bologna |
| 12:30 CET (UTC+01) | Pérez (yellow card) 19'; Mudingayi (yellow card) 62'; Raggi (yellow card) 67' | Report | Lauro (yellow card) 25'; Von Bergen (yellow card) 28'; Parolo 84'; Ceccarelli (yellow card) 90+2'; Rossi (yellow card) 90+3' | Stadium: Stadio Renato Dall'Ara; Attendance: 20,397; Referee: Domenico Celi |

| 27 November 2011 13 | Cagliari | 1–1 | Bologna | Cagliari |
| 15:00 CET (UTC+01) | Cossu (yellow card) 47'; Nainggolan (yellow card) 53'; Ibarbo (yellow card) 61'; Ariaudo (yellow card) 68'; Conti 81' (pen.) | Report | Pulzetti (yellow card) 25'; Kone (yellow card) 34'; Morleo (yellow card) 41'; Di Vaio 75'; Cherubin (yellow card) 80' | Stadium: Stadio Sant'Elia, Attendance: 8,000; Referee: Paolo Valeri |

| 4 December 2011 14 | Bologna | 1–0 | Siena | Bologna |
| 15:00 CET (UTC+01) | Di Vaio 28'; Pulzetti (yellow card) 31' | Report | D'Agostino (yellow card) 42'; Vitiello (yellow card) 67' | Stadium: Stadio Renato Dall'Ara; Attendance: 18,316; Referee: Paolo Mazzoleni |

| 11 December 2011 15 | Bologna | 2–2 | Milan | Bologna |
| 15:00 CET (UTC+01) | Di Vaio 11'; Ramírez (yellow card) 25'; Kone (yellow card) 45+1'; Diamanti (yellow card) 59', (goal) 73'; Pérez (yellow card) 75' | Report | Seedorf 16'; Aquilani (yellow card) 31'; Yepes (yellow card) 31'; Ibrahimović 71' (pen.); Antonini (yellow card) 90+3' | Stadium: Stadio Renato Dall'Ara; Attendance: 25,736; Referee: Gianluca Rocchi |

| 18 December 2011 16 | Genoa | 2–1 | Bologna | Genoa |
| 15:00 CET (UTC+01) | Moretti (yellow card) 33'; Rossi 39', (yellow card) 90'; Kaladze (yellow card) 62'; Pratto 73' | Report | Pulzetti (yellow card) 21'; Ramírez 51', (yellow card) 62'; Mudingayi (yellow card) 59' | Stadium: Stadio Luigi Ferraris; Attendance: 19,278; Referee: Antonio Giannoccaro |

| 21 December 2011 1 | Bologna | 0–2 | Roma | Bologna |
| 20:45 CET (UTC+01) | Diamanti (yellow card) 18'; Kone (yellow card) 68'; Pérez (yellow card) 76'; Portanova (red card) 77' | Report | Osvaldo (yellow card) 7', (goal) 40'; Taddei 17'; Rosi (yellow card) 20' | Stadium: Stadio Renato Dall'Ara; Attendance: 17,855; Referee: Andrea De Marco |
Note: The start of the Serie A season was postponed from its scheduled start (27 and 28 August) to a future date because of a strike declared by the Italian Footballers' Association.

| 8 January 2012 17 | Bologna | 2–0 | Catania | Bologna |
| 15:00 CET (UTC+01) | Di Vaio (yellow card) 28', (goal) 90+1'; Mudingayi (yellow card) 47'; Cherubin 50', (yellow card) 77' | Report | Legrottaglie (yellow card) 28'; Marchese (yellow card) 33'; Álvarez (yellow card) 42'; Izco (yellow card) 45+1'; Biagianti (yellow card) 55' (yellow-red card) 78' | Stadium: Stadio Renato Dall'Ara; Attendance: 14,572; Referee: Andrea Romeo |

| 16 January 2012 18 | Napoli | 1–1 | Bologna | Naples |
| 20:45 CET (UTC+01) | Cavani 71' (pen.); Dossena (yellow card) 89' | Report | Acquafresca 14'; Mudingayi (yellow card) 36'; Morleo (yellow card) 66'; Cherubin (yellow card) 77'; Di Vaio (yellow card) 80' | Stadium: Stadio San Paolo; Attendance: 42,956; Referee: Christian Brighi |

| 22 January 2012 19 | Bologna | 0–0 | Parma | Bologna |
| 12:30 CET (UTC+01) | Ramírez (yellow card) 55' | Report | Morrone (yellow card) 23'; Musacci (yellow card) 46'; Giovinco (yellow card) 59'; Zaccardo (yellow card) 70' | Stadium: Stadio Renato Dall'Ara; Attendance: 15,141; Referee: Mauro Bergonzi |

| 29 January 2012 20 | Roma | 1–1 | Bologna | Rome |
| 15:00 CET (UTC+01) | Juan (yellow card) 54'; Pjanić 62' | Report | Di Vaio 56', (yellow card) 58'; Portanova (yellow card) 59' | Stadium: Stadio Olimpico; Attendance: 34,073; Referee: Marco Guida |

| 5 February 2012 22 | Lecce | 0–0 | Bologna | Lecce |
| 15:00 CET (UTC+01) | Delvecchio (yellow card) 20'; Blasi (yellow card) 45+1'; Carrozzieri (yellow card) 68' (yellow-red card) 74'; Oddo (yellow card) 80' | Report | Morleo (yellow card) 3'; Portanova (yellow card) 36'; Pérez (yellow card) 56'; Ramírez (yellow card) 59'; Antonsson (yellow card) 67' | Stadium: Stadio Via del Mare; Attendance: 5,962; Referee: Paolo Valeri |

| 17 February 2012 24 | Internazionale | 0–3 | Bologna | Milan |
| 20:45 CET (UTC+01) | Sneijder (yellow card) 40' | Report | Diamanti (yellow card) 31'; Di Vaio 37', 38'; Acquafresca 85' | Stadium: San Siro; Attendance: 20,043; Referee: Antonio Damato |

| 21 February 2012 21 | Bologna | 2–0 | Fiorentina | Bologna |
| 18:30 CET (UTC+01) | Diamanti 30', (yellow card) 61'; Ramírez 43' | Report | Gamberini (yellow card) 20'; Vargas (yellow card) 32'; Olivera (red card) 50'; Cassani (yellow card) 84' | Stadium: Stadio Renato Dall'Ara; Attendance: 14,120; Referee: Antonio Danilo Giannoccaro |
Note: The match was postponed from 12 to 21 February because of snow.

| 26 February 2012 25 | Bologna | 1–3 | Udinese | Bologna |
| 20:45 CET (UTC+01) | Taïder (yellow card) 27'; Ramírez (yellow card) 42'; Pérez (yellow card) 43'; Kone 81' | Report | Benatia (yellow card) 31'; Di Natale 38' (pen.); Armero (yellow card) 44'; Basta 56'; Pazienza (yellow card) 60'; Asamoah (yellow card) 74'; Floro Flores 84' | Stadium: Stadio Renato Dall'Ara; Attendance: 16,209; Referee: Paolo Silvio Mazzoleni |

| 4 March 2012 26 | Bologna | 1–0 | Novara | Bologna |
| 18:30 CET (UTC+01) | Di Vaio (penalty missed) 19'; Kone (yellow card) 82'; Acquafresca 82', (yellow card) 84' | Report | García (yellow card) 18'; Lisuzzo (yellow card) 24'; Caracciolo (red card) 78'; Rubino (yellow card) 80' | Stadium: Stadio Renato Dall'Ara; Attendance: 17,516; Referee: Dino Tommasi |

| 7 March 2012 23 | Bologna | 1–1 | Juventus | Bologna |
| 18:30 CET (UTC+01) | Di Vaio 17'; Pérez (yellow card) 60'; Ramírez (yellow card) 68'; Portanova (yellow card) 85' | Report | Pirlo (yellow card) 34'; Vučinić 58'; Bonucci (yellow card) 20' (yellow-red card) 84'; Vidal (yellow card) 90' | Stadium: Stadio Renato Dall'Ara; Attendance: 30,321; Referee: Luca Banti |
Note: The match was postponed from 12 February to 7 March because of snow.

| 11 March 2012 27 | Lazio | 1–3 | Bologna | Rome |
| 20:45 CET (UTC+01) | Matuzalém (red card) 44'; Rubin 56' (o.g.); González (red card) 58' | Report | Portanova 11'; Diamanti 28'; Krhin 60', (yellow card) 61' | Stadium: Stadio Olimpico; Attendance: 29,000; Referee: Marco Guida |

| 18 March 2012 28 | Bologna | 2–2 | Chievo | Bologna |
| 15:00 CET (UTC+01) | Rubin (yellow card) 26'; Di Vaio 59'; Diamanti 81' | Report | Rigoni (yellow card) 12'; Andreolli 26'; Paloschi (yellow card) 42'; Luciano (yellow card) 53'; Acerbi (yellow card) 61'; Théréau 69' | Stadium: Stadio Renato Dall'Ara; Attendance: 17,446; Referee: Massimiliano Irrati |

| 25 March 2012 29 | Atalanta | 2–0 | Bologna | Bergamo |
| 12:30 CET (UTC+01) | Cigarini (yellow card) 41'; Gabbiadini 50'; Tiribocchi 90+1' | Report | Mudingayi (yellow card) 60'; Pérez (red card) 66'; Pulzetti (yellow card) 66'; Diamanti (yellow card) 71'; Raggi (yellow card) 78' | Stadium: Stadio Atleti Azzurri d'Italia; Attendance: 13,600; Referee: Leonardo Baracani |

| 1 April 2012 30 | Bologna | 1–3 | Palermo | Bologna |
| 15:00 CET (UTC+01) | Sørensen 50', (yellow card) 77'; Taïder (yellow card) 90+3' | Report | Barreto (yellow card) 7'; Donati (yellow card) 29', (goal) 68'; Mantovani (yellow card) 47' (yellow-red card) 81'; Labrín (yellow card) 74'; Hernández 76', (yellow card) 89'; Morleo 86' (o.g.) | Stadium: Stadio Renato Dall'Ara; Attendance: 19,440; Referee: Andrea Gervasoni |

| 7 April 2012 31 | Cesena | 0–0 | Bologna | Cesena |
| 15:00 CET (UTC+01) | Rennella (yellow card) 27'; Del Nero (yellow card) 34'; Comotto (yellow card) 90'; Colucci (yellow card) 90+4' | Report | Cherubin (yellow card) 69'; Mudingayi (yellow card) 80'; Di Vaio (yellow card) 90'; Acquafresca (yellow card) 90+4' | Stadium: Stadio Dino Manuzzi; Attendance: 16,497; Referee: Sebastiano Peruzzo |

| 12 April 2012 32 | Bologna | 1–0 | Cagliari | Bologna |
| 20:45 CET (UTC+01) | Diamanti 54', (yellow card) 54'; Mudingayi (yellow card) 85'; Pérez (yellow card) 90+4' | Report | Conti (yellow card) 14'; Canini (yellow card) 41'; Astori (yellow card) 53'; Ekdal (yellow card) 72'; Nainggolan (yellow card) 90+3' | Stadium: Stadio Renato Dall'Ara; Attendance: 15,124; Referee: Marco Di Bello |

| 22 April 2012 34 | Milan | 1–1 | Bologna | Milan |
| 15:00 CET (UTC+01) | Nocerino (yellow card) 49'; Bonera (yellow card) 69' (yellow-red card) 82'; Ibrahimović 90' | Report | Pérez (yellow card) 25'; Ramírez 26'; Taïder (yellow card) 85' | Stadium: San Siro; Attendance: 51,725; Referee: Andrea De Marco |

| 25 April 2012 33 | Siena | 1–1 | Bologna | Siena |
| 15:00 CET (UTC+01) | Destro 52'; Vergassola (yellow card) 68'; Vitiello (yellow card) 74'; Rossi (yellow card) 81' | Report | Brkić 69' (o.g.) | Stadium: Stadio Artemio Franchi; Attendance: 9,011; Referee: Gianpaolo Calvarese |
Note: All the fixtures of 14–15 April weekend were postponed due to Piermario Morosini's death and rescheduled to 24–25 April.

| 29 April 2012 35 | Bologna | 3–2 | Genoa | Bologna |
| 12:30 CET (UTC+01) | Portanova 24'; Ramírez 37'; Garics 67'; Mudingayi (yellow card) 85' | Report | Moretti (yellow card) 39'; Rossi (yellow card) 41'; Palacio 59'; Mesto (yellow card) 76'; Jorquera 77'; Sculli (yellow card) 90+4' | Stadium: Stadio Renato Dall'Ara; Attendance: 23,510; Referee: Antonio Damato |

| 2 May 2012 36 | Catania | 0–1 | Bologna | Catania |
| 20:45 CET (UTC+01) | Spolli (yellow card) 77' | Report | Kone (yellow card) 12'; Ramírez (yellow card) 30', (goal) 79'; Portanova (yellow card) 36' | Stadium: Stadio Angelo Massimino; Attendance: 14,000; Referee: Gennaro Palazzino |

| 6 May 2012 37 | Bologna | 2–0 | Napoli | Bologna |
| 15:00 CET (UTC+01) | Diamanti 17'; Loria (yellow card) 41'; Cherubin (yellow card) 57'; Rubin 64', (yellow card) 64'; Morleo (red card) 90' | Report | Gargano (yellow card) 43'; Britos (yellow card) 60'; Cannavaro (yellow card) 73'; Cavani (yellow card) 82'; Džemaili (yellow card) 83' (yellow-red card) 90'; Aronica (yellow card) 86' | Stadium: Stadio Renato Dall'Ara; Attendance: 26,647; Referee: Mauro Bergonzi |

| 13 May 2012 38 | Parma | 1–0 | Bologna | Parma |
| 18:00 CET (UTC+01) | Biabiany 37'; Valdés (yellow card) 41'; Galloppa (yellow card) 84' | Report | Di Vaio (yellow card) 50'; Belfodil (yellow card) 84' | Stadium: Stadio Ennio Tardini; Attendance: 16,922; Referee: Maurizio Ciampi |

=== Coppa Italia ===
| 21 August 2011 Third round | Bologna | 2–1 | Padova | Bologna |
| 20:45 CEST (UTC+02:00) | Portanova 14'; Della Rocca 90+4' | Report | Italiano 2' (pen.) | Stadium: Stadio Renato Dall'Ara; Attendance: 7,308; Referee: Gianluca Rocchi |

| 23 November 2011 Fourth round | Bologna | 4–2 | Crotone | Bologna |
| 15:00 CET (UTC+01:00) | Diamanti 11' (pen.); Vantaggiato 48'; Giménez 49'; Paponi 65' | Report | Sansone 71'; Đurić 80' (pen.) | Stadium: Stadio Renato Dall'Ara; Attendance: 1,432; Referee: Antonio Danilo Giannoccaro |

| 8 December 2011 Round of 16 | Juventus | 2–1 (a.e.t.) | Bologna | Turin |
| 21:00 CET (UTC+01:00) | Bonucci (yellow card) 55'; Giaccherini 90'; Pazienza (yellow card) 90+5'; Marchisio 102' | Report | Taïder (yellow card) 9'; Raggi (yellow card) 58', (goal) 90+6'; Loria (yellow card) 62'; Acquafresca (yellow card) 90+5' | Stadium: Juventus Stadium; Attendance: 23,078; Referee: Sebastiano Peruzzo |
