= Filipino =

Filipino may refer to:

- Something from or related to the Philippines
  - Filipino language, a de facto standardized variety of Tagalog, the national language, and one of the two official languages of the Philippines
  - Filipinos, people who are natives, citizens and/or nationals of the Philippines, natural-born or naturalized
- Filipinos (snack food), a brand cookies manufactured in Europe

== See also ==
- Filippino (given name)
- Filipinas (disambiguation)
