= Pinoy Capital =

2009 book by Benito Manalo Vergara

Pinoy Capital: The Filipino Nation in Daly City
- Author: Benito Manalo Vergara
- Language: English
- Series: Asian American History and Culture
- Genre: Non-fiction
- Publisher: Temple University Press
- Publication date: 2009
- Publication place: United States

Pinoy Capital: The Filipino Nation in Daly City is a 2009 non-fiction book by Benito Manalo Vergara and published by Temple University Press. The book received favorable reviews from critics.

== Background ==
In 2006 Daly City, California had a population of approximately 35,000 Filipinos. The Immigration Act of 1965 had significantly increased the influx of Filipinos in the city.

== Content ==
The ethnographic study Pinoy Capital was part of the Asian American History and Culture series from the Temple University Press. For his research, Vergara conducted interviews and analyzed newspaper and journal articles alongside books written previously on the subject. The book consists of eight chapters: A Repeated Turning, Little Manila, Looking Forward: Narratives of Obligation, Spreading the News: Newspapers and Transnational Belonging, Looking Back: Indifference, Responsibility, and the Anti-Marcos Movement in the United States, Betrayal and Belonging, Citizenship and Nostalgia, and Pinoy Capital.

The book provides details about the city's history from the early 20th century. Following World War II, Daly City witnessed its transition into a "poorly-planned suburbia". It also discusses the role of media in shaping the notion of "belonging" to the mother country. The most prominent newspaper for the community was The Philippine News, which served as a forum for resisting the dictatorial regime of Ferdinand Marcos; popular TV networks include The Filipino Channel (ABS–CBN); and Filipinas magazine is also headquartered in Daly City.

== Findings ==
Vergara often rejected the "Model Minority" myth and the superficial image of success among Filipinos, and despite reporting that the median household income of Filipinos in Daly City was greater than the average national income in the United States, Vergara notes the median household income is flawed for this community, since there are a higher number of persons per household among the Filipino community. Vergara talks about the class divisions within the community and reported that in Daly City there were many Filipinos who had found employment in low-paying and working-class roles that were beneath their educational attainments. He reported that within parts of Daly City, such as in the "Top of the Hill" neighbourhood, there are poorer communities. As well as this, he reports that in San Francisco, the South of Market neighbourhood, the residents (the majority of whom were Filipino) had a particularly low income for San Francisco. Vergara also mentions on the prevalence of gang activity within the Filipino community at high schools. Moreover, instead of being called Filipino-American, a significant part of the community preferred to be identified as Filipinos. A major issue faced by Filipinos residing in the United States was their need to strike a balance between their relation to the two nations. In 2009, remittances sent by the foreign-employed Filipinos comprised 10% of the total GDP of the Philippines. Filipinos holding American citizenship by birthright are thought to have "lost their traditional Filipino values". A considerable number of interviewees cited reuniting with family as their motive for migrating to the United States. Another interesting thing that Vergara explains is how "Crab Mentality" is a common trait within the Filipino community (specifically immigrant communities), and that often Filipinos will "pull each other down" and have a spiteful, attitude towards other Filipinos. For example Vergara talks to people who prefer to work with white people and black people than other Filipinos, because of the way that Filipinos are treated by other Filipinos in the workplace. The book also describes divisions and differences between generations and the differences between the US-born/second-generation communities and the immigrant communities in how they views being Filipino, American, and traditions.

== Reception ==
Writing for Philippine Quarterly of Culture and Society, John A. Peterson called the work "an intriguing and empathic study of Filipinos in Daly City". Kimberly Alidio (Journal of American Ethnic History) opined "Pinoy Capital is significant for its attention to ... nuances of contemporary immigration". Emily Noelle Ignacio of the University of Washington, Tacoma (Contemporary Sociology) called Vergara's work an "[accomplishment]". She further points out that the word Capital used in the book's title might possibly have two meanings; one referring to Daly City as an ideal destination for emigrating Filipinos and the other being the economic benefits to the Philippines from these migrants.

Ignacio praised the book by calling it "rich in empirical material meticulously situated and adeptly analyzed" and an "important contribution to sociological studies" on topics ranging from nationalism to ethnicity. Linda España-Maram (The Western Historical Quarterly) wrote that the work was "significant in the way that Vergara unpacks questions related to socioeconomic standing".

== Bibliography ==
- Alidio, Kimberly (Fall 2011). "Review: Pinoy Capital: The Filipino Nation in Daly City by Benito M. Vergara Jr". Journal of American Ethnic History. 31 (1). University of Illinois Press: 116–117. doi:10.5406/jamerethnhist.31.1.0116.
- España-Maram, Linda (2010). "Review: Pinoy Capital: The Filipino Nation in Daly City Benito M. Vergara, Jr". The Western Historical Quarterly. 41 (3): 398–399. doi:10.2307/westhistquar.41.3.0398. ISSN 0043-3810.
- Ignacio, E. N. (2010). "Pinoy Capital: The Filipino Nation in Daly City". Contemporary Sociology: A Journal of Reviews. 39 (5): 615–617. doi:10.1177/0094306110380384ss. ISSN 0094-3061. S2CID 145401019.
- Peterson, John A. (March 2010). "Reviewed Work: Pinoy Capital: The Filipino Nation in Daly City, In the series Asian American History and Culture by Benito M. Vergara Jr., Sucheng Chan, David Palumbo-Liu, Michael Omi, K. Scott Wong, Linda Trinh Võ". Philippine Quarterly of Culture and Society. 38 (1). University of San Carlos Publications: 84–87. JSTOR 29792696.
- Vergara, Benito (2009). Pinoy Capital: The Filipino Nation in Daly City. Temple University Press. ISBN 978-1-59213-664-3.
