= Filippo Lombardi =

Filippo Lombardi is the name of:

- Filippo Lombardi (goalkeeper) (born 1990), Italian goalkeeper
- Filippo Lombardi (politician) (born 1956), Swiss politician
