= Filipinas =

Filipinas may refer to:

- Women in the Philippines
- Filipinas, letra para la marcha nacional, the Spanish poem by José Palma that eventually became the Filipino national anthem
- The original Spanish name, and also used in different Philippines languages including Filipino, for the Philippines
- The plural of "Filipina", a female who is a citizen of the Philippines or is of Filipino descent
- Filipinas (magazine), a magazine about Filipino-American life
- Filipinas (film), a 2003 film by Filipino director Joel Lamangan
- Compania de Filipinas, flagship of the Philippine Navy
- Moniker of the Philippines women's national football team, which means "Filipino ladies"

== See also ==
- Filipino (disambiguation)
