= Flippo =

Flippo is a surname. Notable people with this surname include:

- Chet Flippo (1943–2013), American music journalist and biographer
- Dave Flippo (born 1958), American jazz pianist, composer and bandleader
- Rob Flippo (born 1966), American baseball coach
- Ronnie Flippo (born 1937), American politician and congressman
- Scott Flippo, American politician
