= Gastón Ramírez =

Uruguayan footballer (born 1990)

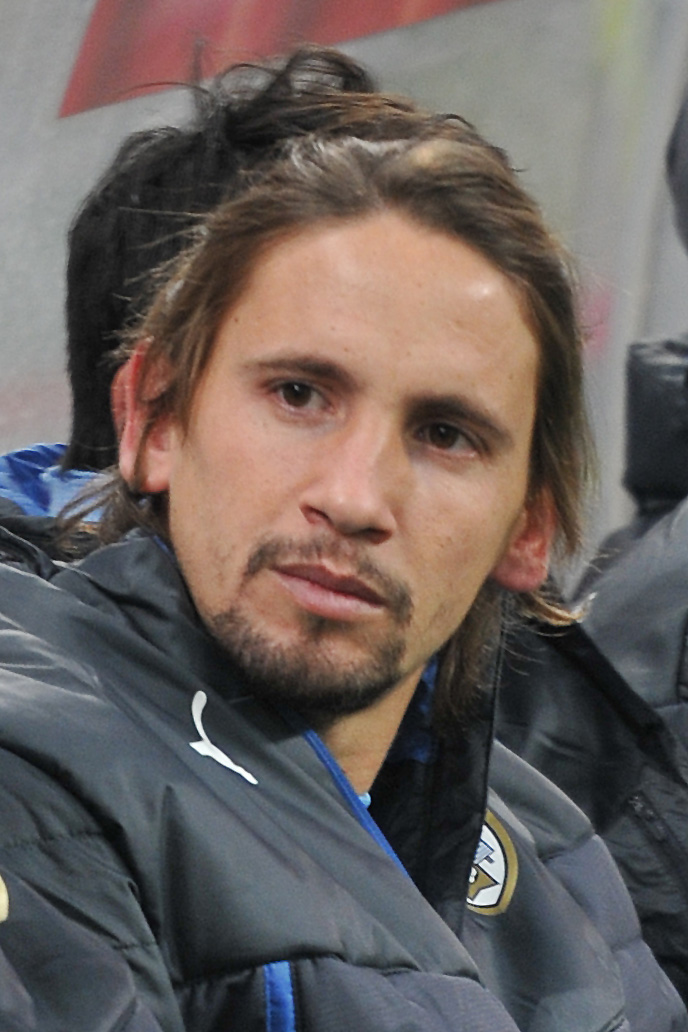
- Ramírez with Uruguay in 2014

Personal information
- Full name: Gastón Exequiel Ramírez Pereyra
- Date of birth: 2 December 1990 (age 35)
- Place of birth: Fray Bentos, Uruguay
- Height: 1.83 m (6 ft 0 in)
- Position: Attacking midfielder

Team information
- Current team: Boston River
- Number: 11

Youth career
- 2005–2008: Peñarol

Senior career*
Years	Team	Apps	(Gls)
2008–2010	Peñarol	42	(8)
2010–2012	Bologna	58	(12)
2012–2016	Southampton	48	(6)
2014–2015	→ Hull City (loan)	22	(1)
2016	→ Middlesbrough (loan)	18	(7)
2016–2017	Middlesbrough	24	(2)
2017–2021	Sampdoria	115	(14)
2021–2022	Monza	6	(1)
2022–2023	Virtus Entella	25	(2)
2023–2024	San Lorenzo	10	(0)
2024	Peñarol	21	(4)
2025	Miramar Misiones	20	(3)
2026–	Boston River	4	(1)

International career
2009	Uruguay U20	3	(0)
2012	Uruguay Olympic	5	(2)
2010–2018	Uruguay	43	(0)
- * Club domestic league appearances and goals as of 27 October 2025

Gastón Exequiel Ramírez Pereyra (Spanish pronunciation: [ɡaˈston raˈmiɾes]; born 2 December 1990) is a Uruguayan professional footballer who plays as an attacking midfielder for Boston River.

He had spells in Uruguay with Peñarol and in Italy with Bologna before moving into the Premier League to Southampton. During his time with Southampton, he spent one season on loan to Hull City in the 2014–15 season in the same division, and the first half of the 2016–17 season with Middlesbrough before joining them permanently for one season. In 2017 he moved back to Italy signing with Sampdoria, before joining Monza in 2021.

Since 2010, he has represented the Uruguay national team, playing for them at the 2012 Olympics, 2013 Confederations Cup and 2014 World Cup.

== Club career ==
=== Peñarol ===
Born in Fray Bentos, Uruguay, Ramírez moved to the capital city Montevideo to join Peñarol when he was sixteen. He made his professional debut for the club at age 18, in a 1–0 loss against Defensor Sporting on 21 March 2009.

His second year there proved to be a breakthrough season for Ramírez, as he was given a handful of first team appearances. Despite being absent from the Torneo Apertura campaign due to international commitments, He scored his first Peñarol goal in a 5–0 win over Atenas on 13 December 2009. In the Torneo Clausura, He scored again and set up a goal in a 2–1 win over Cerro on 30 January 2010. Ramírez scored four more goals against Liverpool, Rampla Juniors, Defensor Sporting and Danubio. He went on to score six goals in 30 games, helping the club win the 2009–10 Primera División.

Ramírez's performance at Peñarol attracted interest from European clubs, such as Schalke 04 and Bologna.

=== Bologna ===
On 25 August 2010, Ramírez was sold to Serie A side Bologna for €2.5 million.

Ramírez made his Bologna debut in a 1–1 draw away to Catania on 26 September 2010 as a substitute for Diego Pérez in the 76th minute. A month later, on 27 October 2010, he scored his first goals for the club in a 3–2 win over Modena in the third round of the Italian Cup. He scored again in the fourth round of the Italian Cup and assisted with another goal in a 3–1 win over Cagliari. He did not score his first Serie A goal for the club until 23 January 2011, in a 3–1 win over Lazio. After suffering an injury, Ramírez scored three more goals in the season against Cagliari, Leece and Fiorentina (where he was sent off after a second bookable offence). He finished his first season at Bologna with four goals and two assists in 25 league appearances, and scored three goals in two Coppa Italia games.

Ahead of the 2011–12 season, Ramírez was linked with Premier League side Manchester City and Inter Milan. He expressed his desire to leave the club but was urged to stay at the club by his then-teammate Marco Di Vaio, which he did. After suffering from an injury, Ramírez returned to the next game on 16 October 2011 and scored his first goal of the season, in a 2–0 win over Novara. He scored three more goals by the end of the year against Atalanta, Palermo and Genoa. His good performance at Bologna earned him a new contract, keeping him until 2016. Despite suffering from an ankle injury, Ramírez scored four more goals later in the 2011–12 season against Fiorentina, Milan, Genoa and Catania. He finished the 2011–12 season, making 33 appearances and scoring eight times in all competitions.

Despite signing a contract during the 2011–12 season, Ramírez continued to be in the transfer speculation, such as Napoli, Inter Milan and Juventus. In response to this, the club offered him a new contract once more. In late August, Ramírez was linked with a move to Southampton and was on the verge of being signed for a reported £12 million. However, the deal was angrily denied by the club's management. With the deal appearing to be stalled, and with his agent stating that the move was bound to fail, it was unexpectedly agreed on 27 August 2012.

=== Southampton ===
On 31 August 2012, Ramírez joined Southampton for a reported £12 million, signing a four-year contract.

He made his debut on 15 September in a 6–1 defeat against Arsenal, coming on as a half-time substitute for Steven Davis. He scored his first goal two weeks later on 29 September 2012, opening the scoring in a 3–1 defeat against Everton. After suffering from a hamstring injury, he returned to the first team, where he played 76 minutes, in a 2–0 loss against West Brom on 5 November 2012. His first home goal came in a 2–0 victory against Newcastle United on 25 November, as well as setting up the other goal. On 1 January 2013, he scored in a 1–1 draw at home to Arsenal. After suffering a leg injury, Ramírez went on to score two more goals later in the season on 2 March 2013, in a 2–1 loss against Queens Park Rangers. and another on 13 April 2013, in a 1–1 draw against West Ham United. However, on 27 April, Ramírez was sent off for an incident involving West Bromwich Albion's Marc-Antoine Fortuné following an elbow on Shane Long. As a result, he was suspended for the last three matches of the season. Ramírez finished his first season at Southampton making twenty-two appearances and scoring five times.

Ahead of the 2013–14 season, Ramírez was linked with a move to clubs around Europe, such as Atlético Madrid and Borussia Dortmund for around 15 million euros. However, Southampton ruled out selling Ramírez and were prepared to reject any bid for him. Ramírez eventually stayed at the club but by the second half of the season, he was featured less in the first team. Despite this, Ramírez scored two goals in the Football League Trophy against Barnsley and Bristol City. Ramírez then scored his first league goal of the season, in a 2–1 loss against Everton on 29 December 2013. However, on 23 January 2014, it was announced that along with Dejan Lovren, Ramírez would be out for six to eight weeks with ankle ligament damage. After being sidelined for six weeks, Ramírez made his return to the first team on 22 February 2014, coming on as a substitute in the 63rd minute, in a 3–1 loss against West Ham United. He finished the 2013–14 season with 18 appearances and scoring once for the club.

Although he made one appearance in the 2014–15 season, in a 3–1 win against West Ham United on 30 August 2014, newly appointed manager Ronald Koeman was keen on using him in the first team, due to his playing style, and expressed reluctance to let him leave the club.

After his loan spell at Hull City came to an end, Ramírez was told by manager Koeman he had no future at the club. In response to this, he showed that he wanted to leave Southampton by ripping up his contract in an attempt to return to Uruguay. Despite this, he made his first appearance for the club in a year, coming on as a substitute in a 6–0 win over Milton Keynes Dons in the second round of the League Cup. After the match, Manager Koeman praised Ramírez after he showed signs of an improvement in his discipline. A month later on 25 October 2015, Ramírez made his first league appearance for the club, where he provided an assist for Sadio Mané, in a 1–1 draw against Liverpool. In the January transfer window, however, Koeman told him that he could leave the club and he subsequently joined Middlesbrough.

He went on to make three appearances for Southampton in the 2015–16 season. At the end of the season, Ramírez was among four players to be released by the club. The Southern Daily Echo reported that Southampton made a £21 million loss on Ramírez and that he had cost them £8000 a minute. After being released by Southampton, he reportedly returned to Uruguay, re-joining Peñarol, due to contractual complications.

==== Hull City (loan) ====
On 1 September 2014, Ramírez was loaned to fellow Premier League club, Hull City. Ramírez stated that he had joined the club to show Hull City's supporters what he can do.

Two weeks later he made his debut at the KC Stadium, replacing fellow debutant Mohamed Diamé for the final 11 minutes of a 2–2 draw against West Ham United. Ramírez was given a straight red card for kicking Tottenham Hotspur's Jan Vertonghen in Hull's 1–2 home defeat on 23 November. He scored once in 22 games for the Tigers – equalising in a 3–1 win at Sunderland on 26 December with a 30–yard strike, before assisting James Chester's header via a corner kick. Ramírez then provided an assist for David Meyler to score Hull City's only goal in a 1–1 draw against Manchester City on 7 February 2015.

However, as the 2014–15 season progressed, Ramírez suffered two injuries and Hull City were relegated at the end of the season.

=== Middlesbrough ===
On 26 January 2016, Ramírez joined Championship side Middlesbrough on loan until the end of the season, when his Southampton contract was due to expire.

He made his debut on 9 February in a 1–1 draw at MK Dons, and two weeks later he scored his first Boro goal, giving them the lead in a 3–1 win against Cardiff City at the Riverside Stadium. On 4 March, he struck both goals in a 2–1 home win over Wolverhampton Wanderers, putting his team on top of the Championship table. Ramírez went on to score four more goals against Queens Park Rangers, a brace against Huddersfield Town and Birmingham City. On 7 May, he was part of the Middlesbrough side that won promotion to the Premier League with a man of the match performance in a 1–1 draw with Brighton & Hove Albion, despite sustaining an injury following a challenge by Dale Stephens.

After leaving Southampton, Ramírez re-joined Middlesbrough, signing a three-year contract on 22 July 2016. Upon joining the club, he stated that it was the club's supporters, who played a role in his return to the club. Ramírez's first game after signing for the club on a permanent basis came in the opening game of the season, where he set up a goal for Álvaro Negredo to put the hosts ahead in a 1–1 home draw against Stoke City. After reappearing for the side on a permanent basis, Ramírez continued to establish himself in the first team, pushing out Stewart Downing. However, he faced criticism over "his alarming loss of form" in a number of matches. He scored his first goal for the side on 29 October 2016, in a 2–0 win over Bournemouth. The goal won BBC Goal of the Month in October. After serving a suspension for receiving a yellow card during the match against Bournemouth, Ramírez then scored against his former club, Hull City, in a 1–0 win on 5 December 2016. In the January transfer window, Leicester City had a bid rejected for Ramírez by the club, leading him to go on a transfer request. But after the transfer window was closed by the end of January, the club managed to keep him. However, as the 2016–17 season began, Ramírez found himself out of the first team with injuries, suspension, competitions and Aitor Karanka's sacking. Following Middlesbrough's relegation in the Premier League at the end of the 2016–17 season, Ramírez made a total of 26 appearances, scoring twice.

Ahead of the 2017–18 season, Ramírez was linked with a possible move away from the club to Benfica and Real Betis among interested. Amid Ramírez's uncertain future, manager Garry Monk called him up in the club's pre-season tour and featured him in the friendly match against Oxford United. Although Monk praised Ramírez' return, his appearance against Augsburg on 29 July 2017 resulted in boos and jeers from Middlesbrough supporters, leading to accusations from club legend Bernie Slaven in the Teesside Gazette of double standards. By the time of his departure, Ramírez became the third Uruguayan player to leave Middlesbrough following the departure of his compatriot Carlos de Pena and Cristhian Stuani.

=== Sampdoria ===
On 4 August 2017, Ramírez joined Serie A side Sampdoria for a fee of £9.85 million. It came after Middlesbrough received no bids for his services and his contract contained no clause allowing him to approach clubs. Reflecting on playing in England he said:"I've been five years in the Premier League (previously at Southampton and Hull), I grew up playing with strong players. I played the World Cup, Copa America, now I've improved and completed. I have the right experience to take on my responsibilities and give the team what is missing in an important moment for my career."

Ramírez made his Sampdoria debut in the opening game of the season, where he set up a goal for Fabio Quagliarella.

=== Monza ===
On 7 December 2021, Ramírez moved to Serie B side Monza until 30 June 2022, becoming the club's first Uruguayan player.

=== Virtus Entella ===
On 22 October 2022, Ramírez signed with Serie C club Virtus Entella.

=== San Lorenzo ===
On 4 August 2023, Ramírez joined San Lorenzo in Argentina with a contract until the end of 2024.

== International career ==
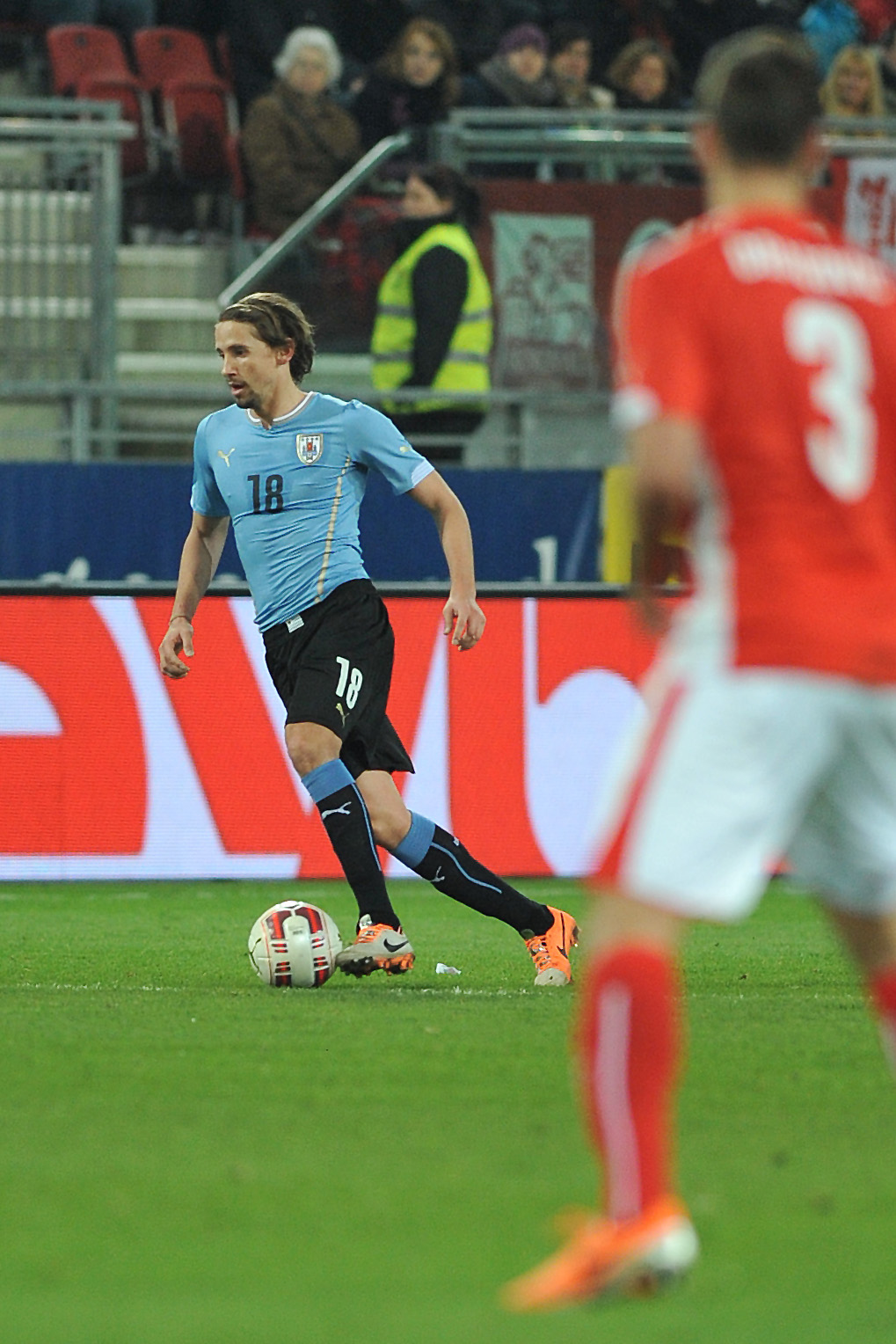
Ramírez playing against Austria in March 2014

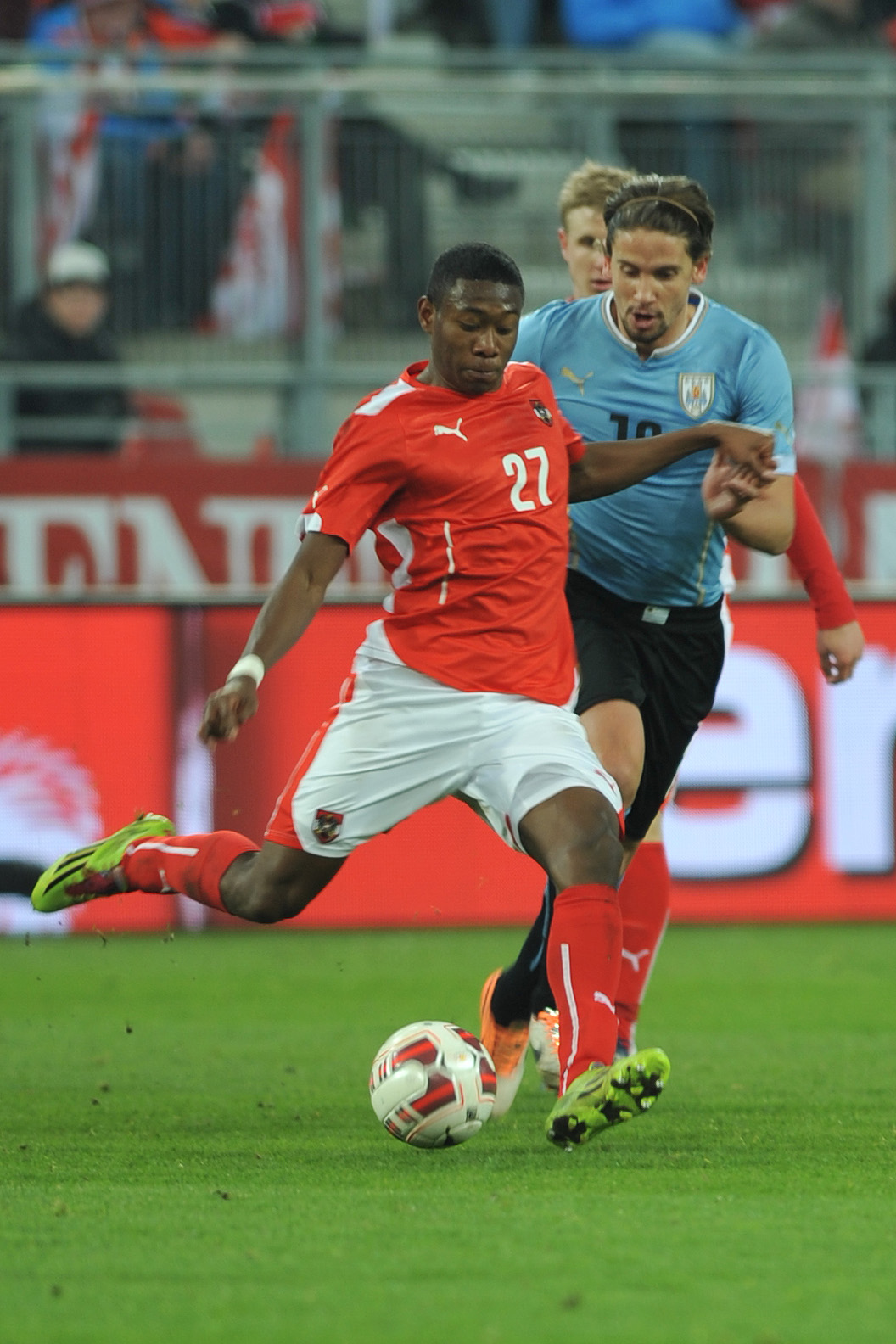
Ramírez challenging David Alaba

In 2009, Ramírez played in the FIFA U-20 World Cup. On 8 October 2010, he received his first full cap for Uruguay in a 7–1 friendly win against Indonesia in Jakarta, replacing Diego Pérez at half time.

In July 2012, he was named in the Uruguay squad for the football tournament at the 2012 Summer Olympics, scoring during a warm-up match against Panama on 15 July. On 26 July, he scored from a free-kick to equalise as Uruguay won 2–1 against the United Arab Emirates at Old Trafford in their opening game, although they were eventually eliminated at the group stage.

In June 2013, Ramírez was picked by Óscar Tabárez for the 2013 FIFA Confederations Cup tournament. Ramírez started the first group game against world champions Spain, and the third match against Tahiti, as Uruguay eventually came fourth.

On 31 May 2014, Ramírez was named in Uruguay's squad for the 2014 FIFA World Cup. He made his tournament debut in the last group game against Italy on 24 June, replacing Cristian Rodríguez after 78 minutes. Three minutes later he supplied the cross from which Diego Godín scored the only goal of the game, putting Uruguay through to the knock-out stages. After missing the Copa América due to a hamstring injury, Ramírez played his first game for Uruguay in a year in a 3–1 win over Trinidad and Tobago and was included in the Copa América Centenario squad, where he played all three matches.

He was named in the squad for the China Cup in March 2018. In May 2018 he was named in Uruguay's provisional 26 man squad for the 2018 World Cup in Russia.

== Personal life ==
Ramírez married Micaela Duarte in the summer of 2012. In early 2016 he became a father when his wife gave birth to a daughter. Upon moving to England, Ramírez said he was taking English lessons as part of his work permit requirements.

== Career statistics ==
=== Club ===
As of match played 29 May 2022

Appearances and goals by club, season and competition
Club	Season	League			National cup (Note: Includes Coppa Italia, FA Cup)		League cup (Note: Includes Football League Cup)		Other		Total	
Club	Season	Division	Apps	Goals	Apps	Goals	Apps	Goals	Apps	Goals	Apps	Goals
Peñarol	2009–10	Uruguayan Primera División	30	6	0	0	—		4	1	34	7
Bologna	2010–11	Serie A	25	4	2	3	—		—		27	7
Bologna	2011–12	Serie A	33	8	0	0	—		—		33	8
Bologna	Total		58	12	2	3	—		—		60	15
Southampton	2012–13	Premier League	26	5	0	0	0	0	—		26	5
Southampton	2013–14	Premier League	18	1	1	0	3	2	—		22	3
Southampton	2014–15	Premier League	1	0	0	0	1	0	—		2	0
Southampton	2015–16	Premier League	3	0	0	0	2	0	—		5	0
Southampton	Total		48	6	1	0	6	2	—		55	8
Hull City (loan)	2014–15	Premier League	22	1	0	0	0	0	—		22	1
Middlesbrough (loan)	2015–16	Championship	18	7	0	0	0	0	—		18	7
Middlesbrough	2016–17	Premier League	24	2	2	0	0	0	—		26	2
Sampdoria	2017–18	Serie A	37	3	3	2	—		—		40	5
Sampdoria	2018–19	Serie A	27	4	2	0	—		—		29	4
Sampdoria	2019–20	Serie A	26	7	1	0	—		—		27	7
Sampdoria	2020–21	Serie A	25	0	0	0	—		—		25	0
Sampdoria	Total		115	14	6	2	—		—		121	16
Monza	2021–22	Serie B	6	1	0	0	—		0	0	6	1
Career total			321	49	11	5	6	2	4	1	342	57

=== International ===
As of 23 March 2018

National team	Year	Apps	Goals
Uruguay	2010	3	0
Uruguay	2011	5	0
Uruguay	2012	6	0
Uruguay	2013	12	0
Uruguay	2014	8	0
Uruguay	2016	8	0
Uruguay	2018	1	0
Total		43	0

== Honours ==
Peñarol

- Uruguayan Primera División: 2009–10

Middlesbrough

- Football League Championship runner-up: 2015–16
