= Flippomusic =

- Origin: Chicago, Illinois, United States
- Genres: Jazz, Jazz fusion
- Years active: 1992–present
- Labels: Southport, Opplif
- Members: Dave Flippo; Dan Hesler; Donn De Santo; Heath Chappell; Aras Biskis

Flippomusic is a contemporary jazz ensemble based in Chicago, Illinois, which was formed in 1992 by pianist Dave Flippo to perform his compositions and arrangements. Members Dan Hesler (saxophone and flute), Donn De Santo (bass), Heath Chappell (drums), and Aras Biskis (percussion).

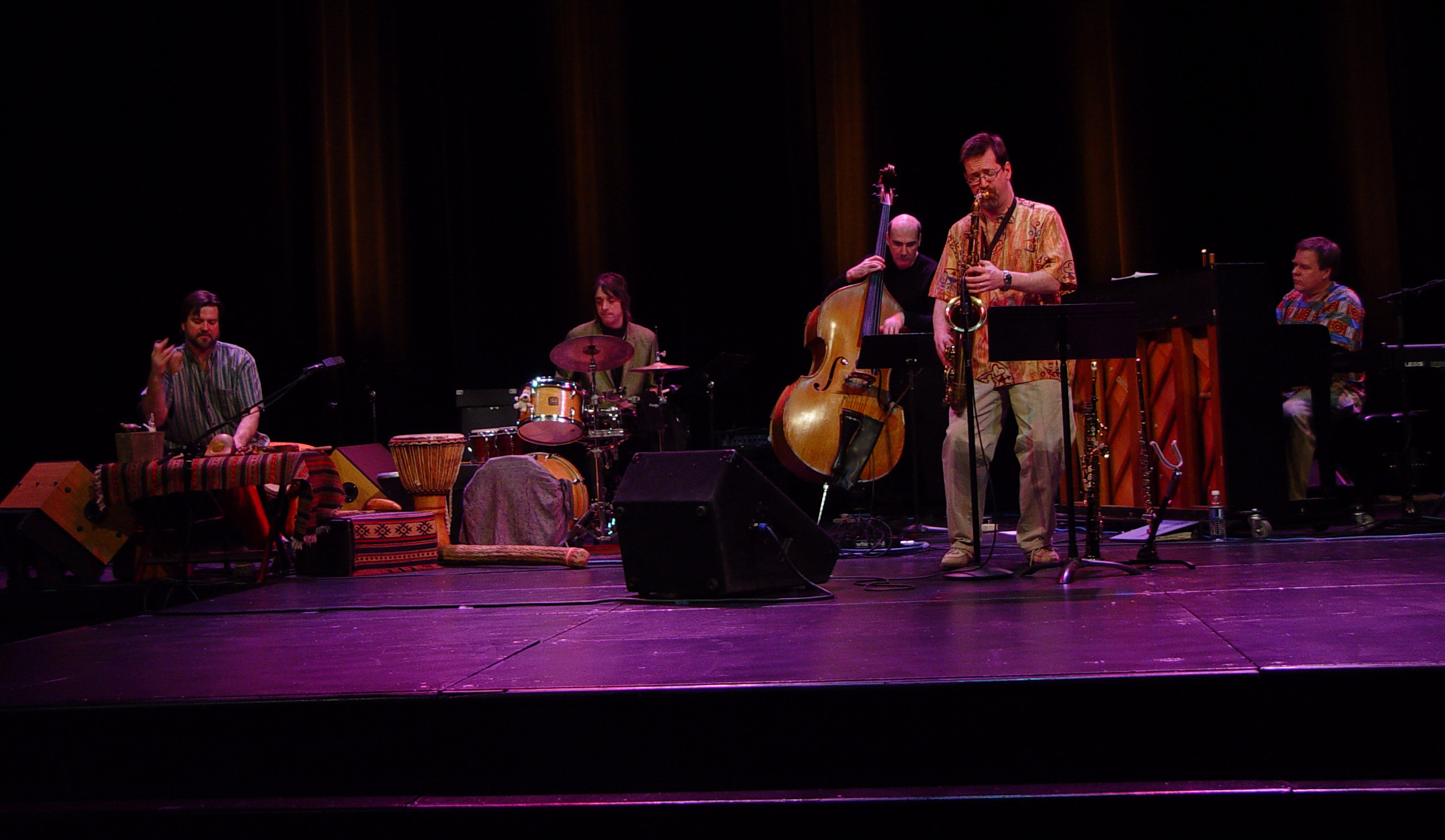
Flippomusic live at the College of Lake County, 1994

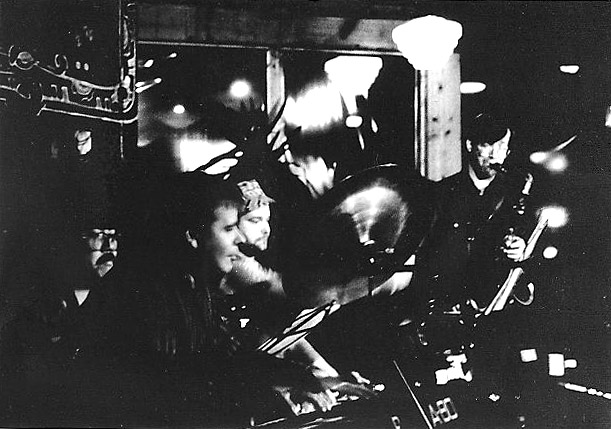
Flippomusic live at the Jazz Bulls, Chicago 1996

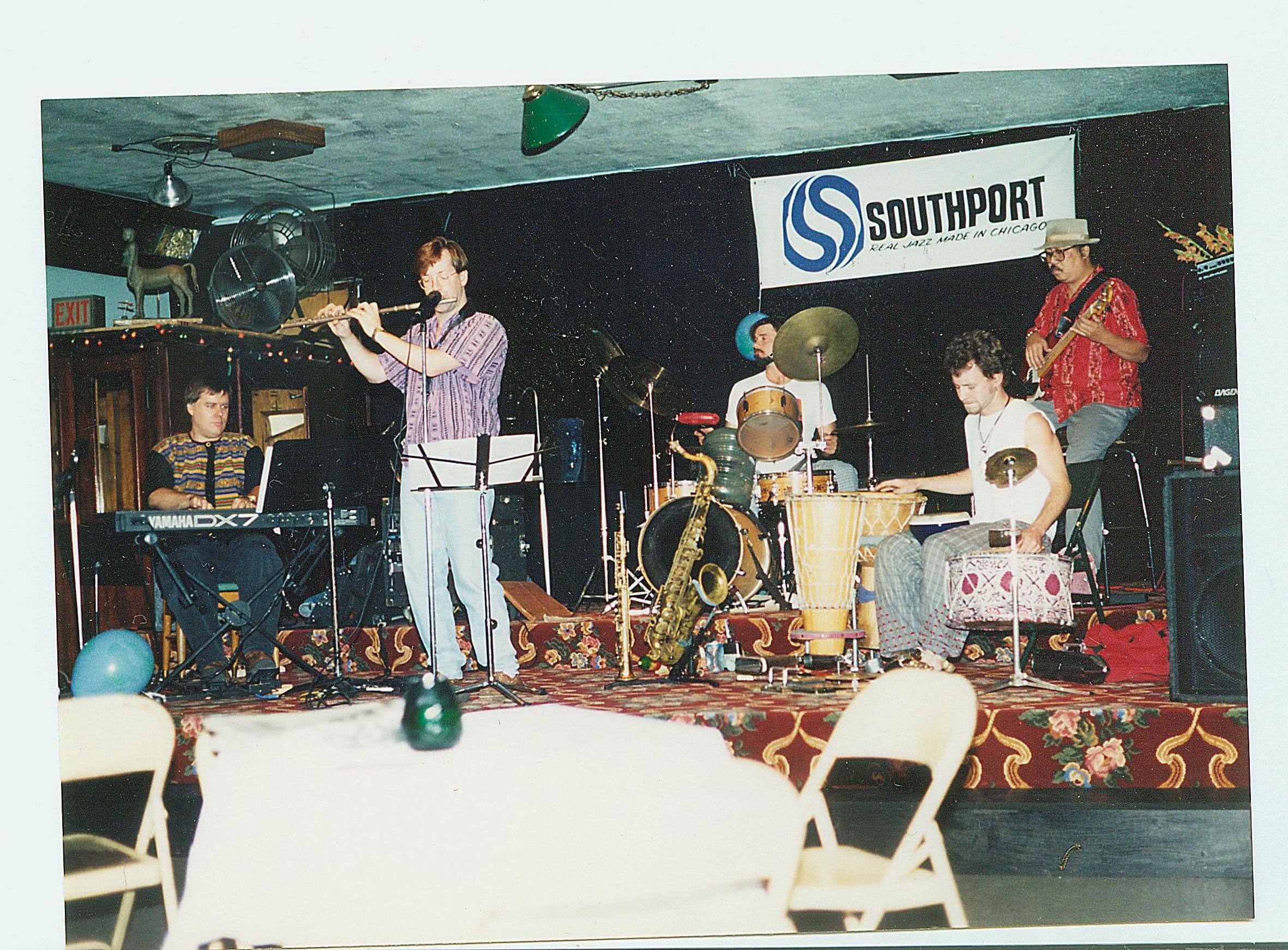
Flippomusic in an earlier incarnation - The Bop Shop, 1999

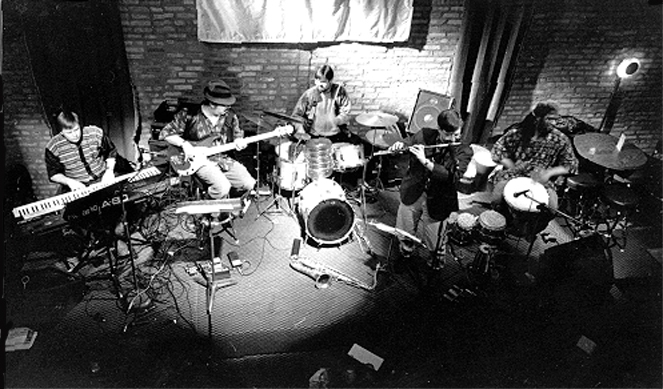
Flippomusic at the Jazz Buffet, Chicago, 1999

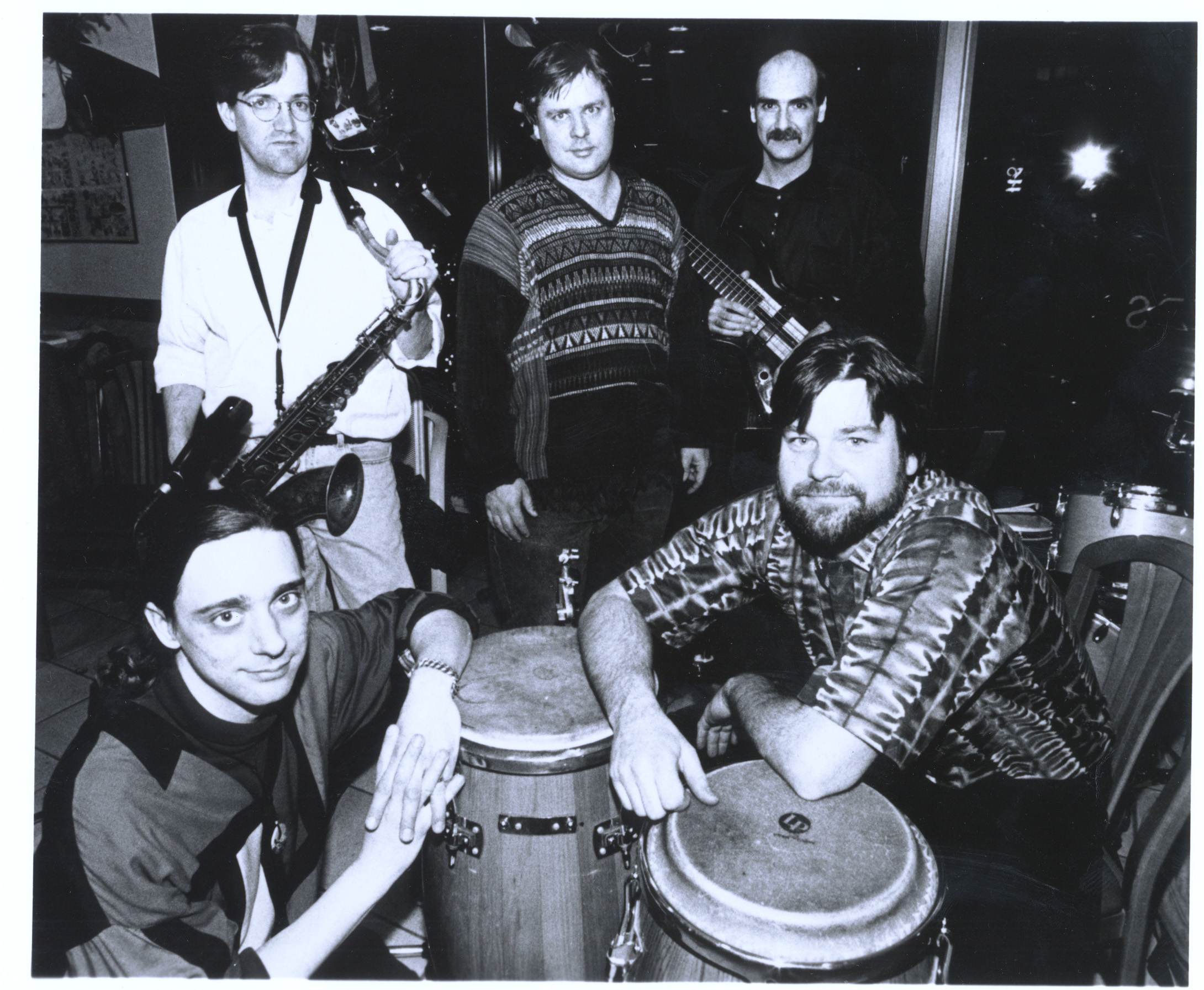
Flippomusic at Borders, 2000

== History ==
=== 1992-1994 - Tendrils of Light ===
Flippomusic gave its first performance at At The Tracks in Chicago and continued performing at area clubs, including the Bop Shop, Jazz Bulls, the Hothouse, Morseland, the Underground Wonderbar, and the Heartland Cafe. The original members of the band included Dave Flippo (keyboards), Dan Hesler (saxophone), Steve Hashimoto (electric bass), Steve Strunk (drums) and John McLean (guitar).The instrumentation was reconfigured in 1993 and the guitar position was replaced by Hamid Drake on percussion with Aras Biskis taking over the drum chair. The band recorded its first CD, Tendril of Light, on the Southport label in 1994 and also won first place in Winterbreak-Cruise to Chicago contest, a City of Chicago-sponsored event which won them a booking at the Taste of Chicago in the same year. Guest artists on Tendrils of Light include Michael Zerang and Ken Gueno on percussion and Donn De Santo on bass.

=== 1994-2001 - Ganesh ===
The band added additional Flippo compositions as well as works by Steve Hashimoto, Dan Hesler and several modern jazz standards to their repertoire and began performing at area colleges, festivals and special events at area museums and art galleries. During the period the instrumentation crystallized into its present form - with Dave Flippo on keys, Dan Hesler on saxes and flute, Donn De Santo on bass, Heath Chappell on drums and Aras Biskis now on percussion. The ensemble released their second CD, Ganesh, in 2001, also on Southport Records. The ensemble tracks were recorded at Donn DeSanto's "Bassplace Productions" studio while the solo piano preludes recorded at Sparrow Sound Design (Southport Records). Guest artists on the recording included Lyon Leifer on bansuri and Yatindra Vaid on tablas.

=== 2001-2005 - When the Heart is Strong the Voice Rings True ===
Shortly after the release of Ganesh, De Santo and Flippo formed a duo and began mixing in new vocal compositions and arrangements of Flippo with jazz standards. For a time it was called Da Duo De Flippo De Santo, but later was considered part of Flippomusic. The larger quintet continued to perform during this period. The band's third release came in 2005 with a primarily duo recording, When the Heart is Strong, the Voice Rings True. The duo was augmented on several tracks by Dan Hesler on saxophones, Leo Murphy on drums and Michael Levin on clarinet.

=== 2005 to present - Tao Tunes ===
During the recording of When the Heart is Strong ..., Flippo completed the Writer's Workshop Program at the Theatre Building Chicago where he composed two full length musicals and studied techniques for setting lyrics to music. Once he complete this course, he resurrected a project he has begun in 2004, the creation of a set of modern vocal jazz pieces that set various chapters of the Tao Te Ching – Tao Tunes. After first creating adapted lyrics from various English translations in the public domain, Flippo composed eighteen pieces and completed the set in 2009. Recording began in March 2010, Tao Tunes was completed in June, 2011 and released November 2011. Guest artists include Larry Gray (cello), Neal Alger (guitar), Hamid Drake (percussion), Mike Levin (Bb and bass clarinet and flute) and Katherine Hughes (violin).

After the recording of Tao Tunes, Flippomusic expanded its program to include music from all four CD's—the "globaljazz" compositions, the vocal duo pieces and the set of Tao Tunes. The band offered programs which were purely "globaljazz" but also one which mixed the earlier material with the new vocal compositions.

== Performances ==
- 1994 – Taste of Chicago
- 1994 – DePaul University Multicultural Festival
- 1994/1996 – Around The Coyote Art Festival
- 1994 – Chicago Cultural Center – live broadcast on WFMT
- 1995 – Independent Label Festival
- 1996 – Chicago Symphony Orchestra "East Meets West Festival"
- 1996 – Southport Jazz Festival (at the Bop Shop)
- 1994 – University of Chicago Jazz Festival
- 1997 – Oakbrook Summer Concert Series
- 1998, 2005 – Condordia College Artist Series
- 1998 – Navy Pier "World Jazz Festival"
- 1998 – "After Hours" at the Art Institute of Chicago
- 1999 – "Jazzin' at the Shed" – Shed Aquarium
- 2000 – Southshore Jazz Festival
- 2003 – Skokie Festival of Cultures
- 2004 – Brookfield Zoo Concert Series
- 2004 – College of Lake County Artist Series
- 2004 – Northwestern University "Lunch on the Lake" Series
- 2009 – Evanston Ethnic Arts Festival
- 2010, 2008, 2007, 2002, 2001, 2000 – Buffalo, Grove Summer Concert Series.
- Summer Fests: Buffalo Grove "Concerts on the Rotary Green" ('93, '94,) Libertyville "Out to Lunch" Series (1995), "Lunch by the Lake" – Northwestern University

== Discography ==
- Tendrils of Light (Southport, 1994)
- Ganes (Southport, 2001)
- When the Heart is Strong, the Voice Rings True (Oppilf, 2004)
- Tao Tunes (Oppilf, 2011)

== Guests and former band members ==
- John McLean – guitar
- Mike Smith – guitar
- Paul Mertens – saxophones and flute
- Pat Mallanger – saxophones
- Ken Vandermark – saxophones
- John Boes – saxophones and flute
- Cameron Pfiffner – saxophones
- Jim Gailloreto – saxophones
- Michael Levin – saxophones and flute
- Winston Damen (Stone) – percussion
- Steve Magnome – drums
- Hamid Drake – percussion
- Lewis Ewerling – drums and percussion
- Bob Garrett – percussion
- Michael Zerang – percussion
- Ken Gueno – percussion
- Kurt Loeffler – drums
- Jim Widlowski – drums
- Ted Sirota – drums
- Alejandro Cimadoro – bass
- Mike Fiorino – bass
- Chris Clementi – bass
