= Dave Flippo =

American jazz musician

Dave Flippo (born David William Flippo on March 1, 1958 in Pittsburgh, Pennsylvania), is a jazz pianist, composer, vocalist, teacher and bandleader. He is the leader of the Chicago-based modern jazz quintet FLIPPOMUSIC (originally FLIPPOMUSIC GLOBALJAZZ), an ensemble whose unique "globaljazz" approach to jazz and large body of original compositions has given it a special place in the Chicago jazz scene. Flippo is also a past member of slam poet Marc Smith's Pong Unit Band.

== Biography ==
=== Early years and school ===
Dave Flippo was born in Pittsburgh on March 1, 1958 and began piano studies at the age of four. He is a graduate of Baldwin High School (1976). He received degrees from the Indiana University of Pennsylvania (1980-B.A. in Music Composition and Theory), the Eastman School of Music (1982-Masters of Music in Music Composition) and the University of Michigan (1987-Doctorate of Musical Arts in Music Composition). His minors and side studies included conducting, ethnic music, music history and jazz.

=== Jazz studies and teaching in Chicago ===
During the final year of studies at the U of M, Dave began jazz piano studies with Alan Swain in Chicago and, upon graduation, moved to Chicago to continue these studies, perform and teach at the Swain Music Studios. He taught at the Swain Studio until 2010, when it restructured and presently teaches at his own Skokie-based piano studio – Dr. Flippo's Eclectic Piano Studio, teaches in the home in the North Shore are and is jazz instructor at the College of Lake County (1997 to present) and Triton College (2011 to present.) He also taught piano at DePaul University (1995–1999).

=== Third Stream performance and composition ===
Between the years 1988 - 1990, Flippo began performing and composing for the Ethos Chamber Orchestra, which specialized in "third stream" compositions – classical music with jazz influences and areas of improvisation. He wrote two commissioned works for the group: "Two Visions at Twilight" and "A Walk in the Park."

=== GlobalJazz and the birth of Flippmusic ===
In 1992, Flippo began composing new pieces he called "globaljazz" and formed the jazz quintet "FLIPPOMUSIC." The group performed throughout the Chicago area and has recorded two CDs of globaljazz (Tendrils of Light, Ganesh) and two CD's featuring Flippo singing both standards and his own original vocal compositions (When the Heart is Strong, Tao Tunes). While composing music for Ganesh, he studied Indian raag theory with Lyon Leifer (bansurist) and Muntaz Ali (tabla.)

== Musicals ==
- Amelia -Book by Lynn Chloe Bolan, lyrics by Lynn Sanders, music by Dave Flippo.
- Roxane of Bergerac -Book and lyrics by Marie Yuen, music by Dave Flippo.(p. 27)

== Other work ==
- Musical Director and soloist at Unity Bright Horizons and Unity Church of Lake County 2000–2005.
- Member of slam poetry band Pong Unit Band which performed with Marc Smith at the Green Mill Club in Chicago and on national tours. 2000–2006. Also performed with the Mo Pu Gumbo poetry troupe under the direction on Marc Smith – 2006–2007.
- Graduate of Writer's Workshop at the Theatre Building Chicago -a two-year program focusing on creating musicals. Composed two musicals: Amelia and Roxane of Bergerac. 2006–2007. (p. 27)

== Discography ==
- New Age Variations (Inner Light, 1985)
- Winter Sketches (Inner Light, 1985)
- Tendrils of Light (Southport, 1994)
- Ganesh (Southport, 2001)
- When the Heart is Strong, the Voice Rings True (Oppilf, 2004)
- Tao Tunes (Oppilf, 2011)
- Life on Mars (Oppilf, 2016)
