= Daniele Portanova =

Italian footballer (born 1978)

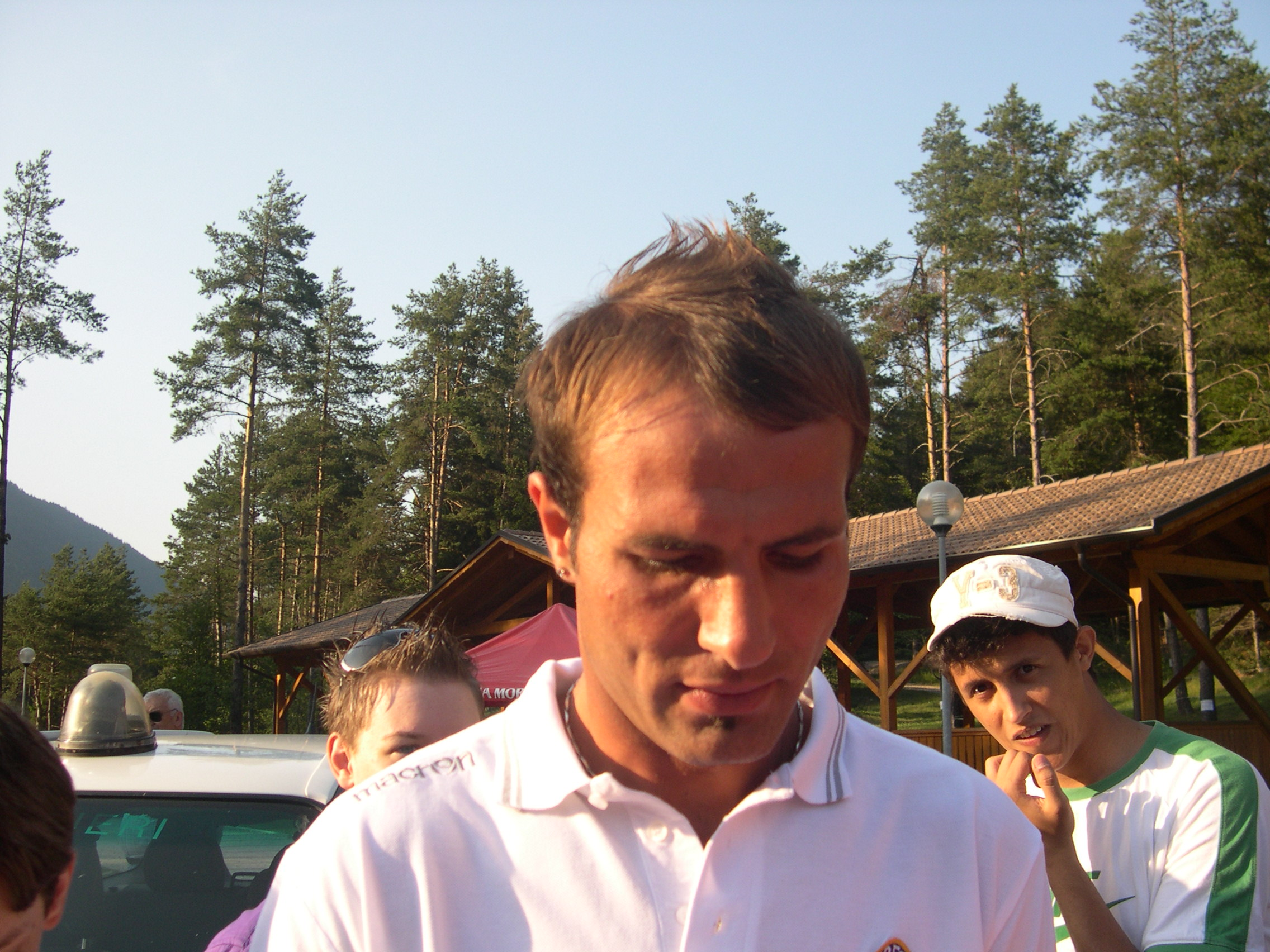

Personal information
- Full name: Daniele Portanova
- Date of birth: 17 December 1978 (age 47)
- Place of birth: Rome, Italy
- Height: 6 ft 1 in (1.85 m)
- Position: Centre-back

Team information
- Current team: Cosenza (technical collaborator)

Youth career
- Roma
- Fermana

Senior career*
Years	Team	Apps	(Gls)
1997–1998	Fermana	20	(1)
1998–1999	Genoa	6	(0)
1999	→ Cosenza (loan)	0	(0)
1999–2000	→ Avellino (loan)	9	(0)
2000–2003	Messina	85	(5)
2003–2004	Napoli	31	(0)
2004–2009	Siena	158	(8)
2009–2012	Bologna	108	(7)
2013–2014	Genoa	36	(2)
2014–2016	Robur Siena	27	(1)
Total		480	(24)
- * Club domestic league appearances and goals

Daniele Portanova (born 17 December 1978) is an Italian former footballer who played as a defender.

== Playing career ==
Portanova started his professional career at third division side Fermana F.C., debuting in 1996 and leaving for then Serie B side Genoa C.F.C.. He started the first four games of the season but managed just two more minutes of football for the rest of the season after that. This prompted him to leave Genoa for third division side A.S. Avellino 1912 on loan for the 1999–2000 season. After a disappointing time at Avellino, where he managed just nine appearances, Genoa sold the young defender to the third-division side Messina.

=== Messina ===
Portanova immediately became a vital member of the Messina side, which was promoted from 2000–01 to Serie B. He made 18 appearances in 2001–02, missing 15 rounds in the middle of the season due to an injury. The 2002–03 season was the best of Portanova's career to date, with the defender managing 34 appearances and even scoring four goals for the side.

=== Napoli ===
His strong form the season before prompted southern heavyweights S.S.C. Napoli to make a move for the player. He made 31 appearances in his first and only season for the club as the side finished 14th in Serie B.

=== A.C. Siena ===
Daniele's continued good form in the second division of Italy finally led to a move to Serie A, where he was picked up by AC Siena. He made 26 appearances and even managed four goals in the 2004–05 season, as the side finished 14th, comfortably clear of relegation. The next season, Daniele continued as a mainstay at Siena, making 32 appearances as the side finished 15th. In August 2009, Portanova was moved to Bologna from AC Siena after 162 appearances and 10 goals for Siena over five years. His departure was very much mourned by fans who came to love the player over his time at the club.

=== Bologna ===
Portanova moved to Bologna in a swap deal as Claudio Terzi moved the other way. He made 36 appearances in his debut season for the club, scoring his first goal in a 2–0 win over Livorno in round 5 of the 2009–10 Serie A season. The following season, he continued as a central part of the first team, scoring a single goal in 34 appearances, the winner in a 1–0 victory over Catania. The next season, Portanova's good form and leadership helped his side finish 9th in Serie A, despite struggling in recent seasons. He scored four goals from defence in 35 appearances, including one in a 1–1 draw against Juventus.

Portanova was banned from football for four months in the summer of 2012 as a result of failing to report attempted match-fixing. Notably, the Italian FA did not actually ban Portanova for match-fixing or trying to fix a football match, simply for failing to report a significant conversation the player overheard.

Portanova returned to action in round 17 as he faced former side Napoli. In a remarkable return to football, Daniele scored an 89th-minute winner as his struggling side managed an unlikely 3–2 win over the third-placed Neapolitans.

=== Return to Genoa ===
Portanova returned to Genoa on 30 January 2013, right on transfer deadline day, for an undisclosed fee. The Genovese club brought the player in, in an attempt to turn around their season as they were hovering just above relegation. In the end, Portanova and company did just enough as Genoa finished six points clear of relegation. In the off-season of 2013, Daniele was appointed as captain of his new club. He made 22 appearances that season, struggling towards the end of the campaign due to injuries and loss of form. He was released by the Grifone at the end of the 2013–14 season.

=== Return to Siena ===
After an extended time without a club, Portanova joined Siena after the club was excluded from professional football and admitted to Serie D.

== Coaching career ==
On 2 March 2025, Portanova was appointed as a first-team technical collaborator at Cosenza.

== Personal life ==
His son Manolo Portanova is also a professional footballer.
