= Filippo Scerra =

Italian politician (born 1978)

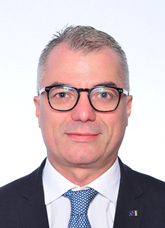
- Scerra in 2022

Member of the Chamber of Deputies
- Incumbent
- Assumed office 23 March 2018
- Constituency: Sicily 2 – P03 (2018–2022); Sicily 2 – P03 (2022–present)

Personal details
- Born: 25 March 1978 (age 48)
- Party: Five Star Movement

Filippo Scerra (born 25 March 1978) is an Italian politician serving as a member of the Chamber of Deputies since 2018. He has served as quaestor of the Chamber since 2022.
