= Filippino (given name) =

Filippino is a male Italian given name and the diminutive form of Filippo. Notable people with the name include:

- Filippino Doria (1470/1480–1548/1558), Italian admiral
- Filippino Lippi (1457–1504), Italian painter
