= Filipinos (snack food) =

Spanish cookie brand

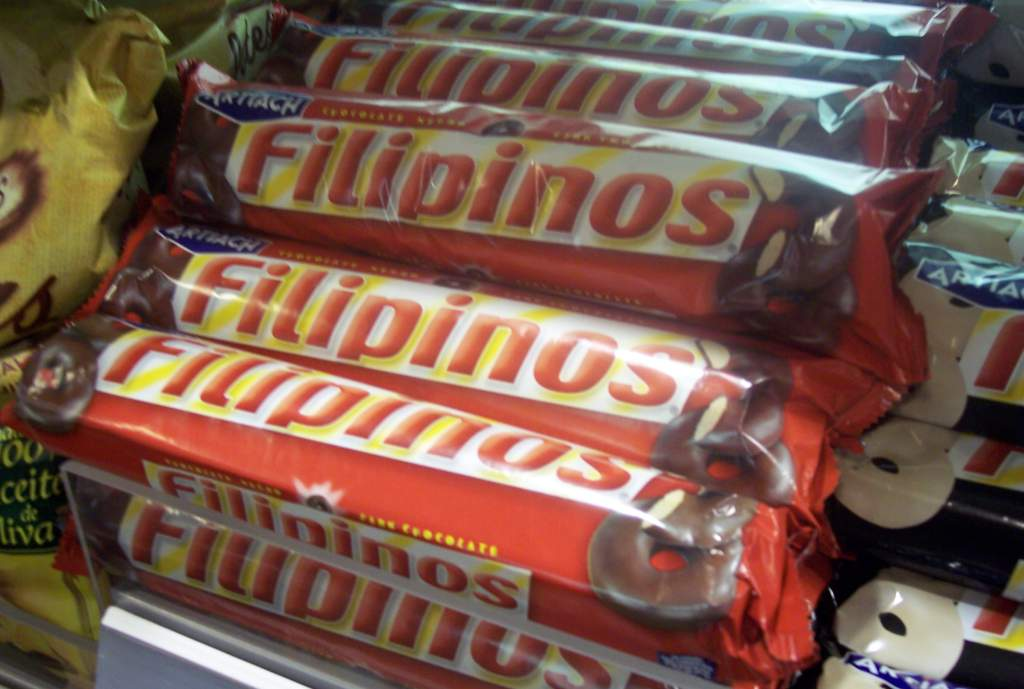
- Product type: Biscuit doughnut
- Current owner: Artiach
- Country: Spain
- Website: https://www.artiach.es/en

Filipinos is a Spanish cookie brand, characterized by its crunchy texture and chocolate coating. Currently, Filipinos is a brand under the company Artiach. The brand is sold in over 40 countries, some being Portugal, Finland, Sweden, the Netherlands and Morocco. In the Philippines, the cookies are sold under the brand name Chiquilin.

== Variations ==
There are several versions of Filipinos: white chocolate, dark chocolate, or milk chocolate and flavors such as salted caramel, red berries, and speculoos.

Filipinos has also introduced new flavors and limited editions. Some examples include Black Cookie and a collaboration with Dinosaurus (another Adam Foods brand), which combines Filipinos’ white chocolate with the flavor of Dinosaurus cookies.

== History ==
These cookies are produced by Artiach. It was founded in the early 20th century in the Ribera de Deusto by brothers Gerardo and Gabriel Artiach Astegui, the company later moved its production to Orozko.

In 2012, Artiach became part of Adam Foods.

== Collaborations ==
Filipinos has also partnered with major international brands like Unilever to create an ice cream line. The brand has also collaborated with McDonald’s and Burger King, resulting in the McFlurry Filipinos White and the King Fusion, respectively. Other collaborations include Danone and its Danet custard, as well as Nestlé, with nougat, chocolate bars, and bonbons. Another notable partnership was with Phoskitos, featuring a Filipinos topping.

== Controversy ==
The government of the Philippines filed a diplomatic protest with the government of Spain, the European Commission and the then-manufacturer Nabisco Iberia in 1999. The protest objected to the use of the name "Filipinos", a term which can refer to the people of the Philippines, to market cookie and pretzel snacks and demanded that Nabisco stop selling the product until the brand name was changed.

The resolution's author, former Philippine Congressman and Senator Heherson Álvarez, claimed that the name of the cookie was offensive due to the apparent reference to their color, "dark outside and white inside". His resolution stated "These food items could be appropriately called by any other label, but the manufacturers have chosen our racial identity, and they are now making money out of these food items." On August 26, 1999, President Joseph Estrada called the brand "an insult".

The protest was filed despite Foreign Secretary Domingo Siazon's initial reluctance on the matter. Siazon had reportedly said he saw nothing wrong with the use of "Filipinos" as a brand name, noting Austrians do not complain that small sausages are called "Vienna sausages".

The controversial snack has been sold on the market for over 40 years. There were statements however, that the chocolate-covered snack was named "Filipinos" due to its brown outer layer and white inside before the snack was bought by Nabisco.
