= Filippo Nicolini =

Filippo Nicolini (died 1775) was an Italian impresario who dominated the theatre scene in Braunschweig for over twenty years.

== Life ==
=== Early life ===
Nothing is known of his early life, though documents show he toured Holland, France and several German cities with his child pantomime troupe. In September 1745 he was in Frankfurt am Main, where the city council gave him permission to perform pantomimes during the festivities for the coronation of Francis I. He also toured to Vienna, Prague and Leipzig, where Gotthold Ephraim Lessing saw them but dismissed them afterwards as "trained little monkeys". The composer Ignazio Fiorillo joined the troupe in 1747 and composed many intermezzos for it. In November 1749 Nicolini opened his "Opera Pantomima di Piccoli Hollandesi" in a large wooden booth on Hamburg's Neumarkt, which he ran until 5 June 1749 that year. He then stayed at the Dresden court.

=== Braunschweig ===
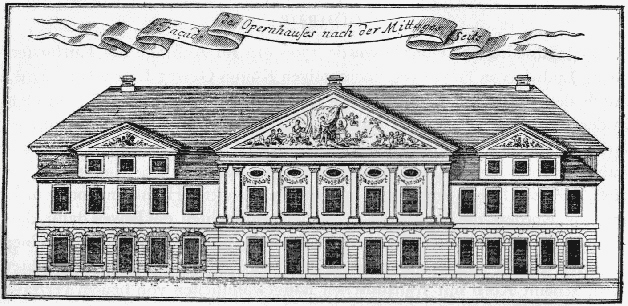
The opera house on Hagenmarkt, seen from the south - engraving by A. A. Beck, 1747

Presumably in autumn 1749 Nicolini moved from Dresden to Braunschweig, which became his main workplace. He became a favourite of both the public in Braunschweig and Duke Charles I, with the latter giving him the title "director of spectators", making him director-general of all the theatres in the duchy. Traveling theatre troupes had to obtain performance permits from him. The theatre painters Amandus Andreides and Giovanni Battista Innocenzo Colombo worked for Nicolini in Braunschweig.

The existing Opernhaus am Hagenmarkt gained in importance when the ducal residence moved from Wolfenbüttel to Braunschweig in 1753. Nicolini had it restored at great expense and modernised the outdated theatre machinery. He recruited an Italian singing company, thereby ushering in the first brilliant period of Braunschweig opera. The high quality of the venue is evident in a 1764 diary entry by Scottish writer James Boswell: "Then I went to the opera, which is quite impressive. The Brunswick Opera House is much more magnificent than the one in London.". Nicolini built a separate building on Burgplatz for his comedy and pantomime performances. He invited foreign companies as well as the Wanderbühne run by Konrad Ernst Ackermann, with the latter performing at the Braunschweig fair in 1763, 1764, 1769 and 1770 - the actor Friedrich Ludwig Schröder was also a member of this company.

=== Bankruptcy and escape ===
In 1768, Nicolini fell victim to the restructuring of the city's shattered finances by Hereditary Prince Karl Wilhelm Ferdinand, who withdrew his financial support. Nicolini continued to run the pantomime theatre privately but it went bankrupt. The opera house at the Hagenmarkt was closed and the members of the court orchestra were dismissed. At the end of 1771, despite his numerous creditors, Nicolini was permitted to leave the city and even to take the pantomime theatre's decorations with him. While his wife Maria Magdalene remained in Braunschweig (where she eventually died on 31 December 1774), Nicolini went to Hamburg, where he signed a contract with Ackermann's widow, the actress Sophie Charlotte Schröder, which allowed him to perform on her stage. Due to changing tastes, Nicolini was unable to recapture his former success. In March 1773, he was once again forced to flee his creditors and left Hamburg. His trail disappears thereafter. One rumour states that he died around 1775 in a monastery near Goslar.

== Children ==
Nicolini had at least four children, including the singer Therese Nicolini (1759–after 1799), who married the actor and theater director Josef Bellomo (born Joseph, Edler von Zambiasi, 1754–1833) in Graz in 1777.

Anna Nicolini, who worked for Filippo as a "prima donna" and was known as "Schöne Anna" (beautiful Anna") and to whom he owed a considerable part of his success, later returned to Braunschweig, where she is said to have died as a beggar in 1788.

== Bibliography (in German) ==
- Johann Gottlieb Benzin: Versuch einer Beurtheilung der Pantomimischen Oper des Herrn Nicolini. Nonne, Erfurt 1751 (Digitalisat)
- Horst-Rüdiger Jarck (Hrsg.): Braunschweigisches Biographisches Lexikon. 8. bis 18. Jahrhundert. Appelhans, Braunschweig 2006, ISBN 3-937664-46-7, S. 523–524
- Hermann Arthur Lier (1886). "Nicolini, Philipp" . Allgemeine Deutsche Biographie (in German). Vol. 23. Leipzig: Duncker & Humblot. pp. 632–635.
