= Filipinas (magazine) =

Magazine about Filipino-American life

Filipinas was a monthly magazine that catered to the Filipino American community. The magazine's inception was in 1992 and it became a nationally-distributed magazine that served Filipinos in the United States. It covered many aspects of the Filipino diaspora, particularly on Philippine heroes, leaders and achievers, culture, history, travel, food and entertainment. It provided a calendar of Filipino events in the coming months.

The magazine had been under much financial pressure since the economic downturn in the U.S. in 2007 and constantly struggled after that, according to the editor's column in the magazine. While it still had much advertising, apparently the downturn caused many advertisers to drop their number of ads. The Better Business Bureau reported the parent company, the Filipinas Magazine Company, on April 26, 2010, filed for bankruptcy with the aim of dissolving the company. Filipinas still managed to publish a high-quality monthly magazine, although sometimes it came out more than a month late. The magazine ceased publication with its September 2010 issue.

In 2007 parts of Filipinas issues were archived for use online. When publication of the magazine ceased it was decided to run it as an online publication. Since September 2010, new articles have been written and posted online, but the amount of new material is much less than was written when issues were printed. Also, some new videos were produced and an online bookstore offered publications on Philippine subjects. Much, however, was now missing. For instance, the monthly listing of events board for Filipinos in the U.S., which was an important part of the print version of Filipinas, was gone. A few notices of events around the U.S. continued to exist. Also, Filipinas had a page on Facebook and LinkedIn. The online site had only sporadic postings, sometimes months apart. Sometime between late 2013 and May 2014, the Filipinas website became wholly devoted to Vape Electronic Cigarettes. As of late 2014 the website was only intermittently working. The Facebook page and the LinkedIn pages became inactive by that time. In May 2015 the website disappeared, marking the end of any presence of Filipinas magazine.

The office of Filipinas was for a number of years at GBM Building, 1580 Bryant St., Daly City, CA 94015.

In 2012 a new online Filipino magazine, Positively Filipino, appeared. It eventually introduced some of the old Filipinas board as now associated with its staff. Positively Filipino said by October 2014, "Mona Lisa Yuchengco, founder and former publisher of Filipinas Magazine reunites with the magazine’s former editor in chief Rene Ciria-Cruz, former managing editor Gemma Nemenzo and former art director Raymond Virata."
