= Filippo Lombardi (footballer) =

Italian footballer

Personal information
- Full name: Filippo Lombardi
- Date of birth: 22 April 1990 (age 36)
- Place of birth: Ancona, Italy
- Height: 1.87 m (6 ft 1 1/2 in)
- Position: Goalkeeper

Youth career
- ?–2007: Ancona

Senior career*
Years	Team	Apps	(Gls)
2008–2010	Ancona	0	(0)
2008–2010	→Alma Fano (loan)	59	(0)
2010–2015	Bologna	0	(0)
2013–2014	→ Bassano (loan)	8	(0)
2014–2015	→ Santarcangelo (loan)	2	(0)
2016	Biagio Nazarro	0	(0)
2018–2019	Camerano	21	(0)
- * Club domestic league appearances and goals as of 12 June 2019

Filippo Lombardi (born 22 April 1990) is an Italian goalkeeper who currently plays for Camerano Calcio in Eccellenza.
