= 2018–19 AS Roma season =

Roma
2018–19 season
- President: James Pallotta
- Manager: Eusebio Di Francesco (until 7 March); Claudio Ranieri (from 8 March)
- Stadium: Stadio Olimpico
- Serie A: 6th
- Coppa Italia: Quarter-finals
- UEFA Champions League: Round of 16
- Top goalscorer: League: Stephan El Shaarawy (11); All: Edin Džeko (14)
- Highest home attendance: 62,304 vs Parma (26 May 2019, Serie A)
- Lowest home attendance: 20,984 vs Virtus Entella (14 January 2019, Coppa Italia)
- Average home league attendance: 38,622
Home colours	Away colours	Third colours

The 2018–19 season was Associazione Sportiva Roma's 91st in existence and 90th season in the top flight of Italian football. Having finished third the previous season, the club competed in Serie A, the Coppa Italia, and the UEFA Champions League.

The season was coach Eusebio Di Francesco's second in charge of the club. On 18 June 2018, Di Francesco extended his contract to remain as manager until 2020. However, after a poor string of results and elimination from the Champions League, Di Francesco was sacked on 7 March 2019 and replaced with former manager Claudio Ranieri.

== Players ==
=== Squad information ===
Last updated on 26 May 2019
Appearances and goals include all competitions

No.	Player	Nat.	Position(s)	Date of birth (age)	Signed from	Signed in	Contract ends	Apps	Goals
Goalkeepers
1	Robin Olsen	(Sweden)	GK	8 January 1990 (aged 29)	(Denmark) Copenhagen	2018	2023	35	0
63	Daniel Fuzato	(Brazil)	GK	4 July 1997 (aged 21)	(Brazil) Palmeiras	2018	2022	0	0
83	Antonio Mirante	(Italy)	GK	8 July 1983 (aged 35)	(Italy) Bologna	2018	2021	13	0
Defenders
2	Rick Karsdorp	(Netherlands)	RB	11 February 1995 (aged 24)	(Netherlands) Feyenoord	2017	2022	15	0
5	Juan Jesus	(Brazil)	CB / LB	10 June 1991 (aged 28)	(Italy) Internazionale	2016	2020	84	1
11	Aleksandar Kolarov	(Serbia)	LB	10 November 1985 (aged 33)	(England) Manchester City	2017	2020	90	12
15	Iván Marcano	(Spain)	CB	23 June 1987 (aged 32)	(Portugal) Porto	2018	2021	13	1
18	Davide Santon	(Italy)	LB / RB	2 January 1991 (aged 28)	(Italy) Internazionale	2018	2022	21	0
20	Federico Fazio	(Argentina)	CB	17 March 1987 (aged 32)	(England) Tottenham Hotspur	2016	2019	135	11
28	William Bianda	(France)	CB	30 April 2000 (aged 19)	(France) Lens	2018	2023	0	0
44	Kostas Manolas	(Greece)	CB	14 June 1991 (aged 28)	(Greece) Olympiacos	2014	2022	206	9
Midfielders
4	Bryan Cristante	(Italy)	CM / AM	3 March 1995 (aged 24)	(Italy) Atalanta	2018	2019	44	4
7	Lorenzo Pellegrini	(Italy)	CM	19 June 1996 (aged 23)	(Italy) Sassuolo	2017	2022	71	6
16	Daniele De Rossi (Captain)	(Italy)	DM / CM	24 July 1983 (aged 35)	(Italy) Youth Sector	2001	2019	616	63
19	Ante Ćorić	(Croatia)	CM / AM	14 April 1997 (aged 22)	(Croatia) Dinamo Zagreb	2018	2023	3	0
22	Nicolò Zaniolo	(Italy)	CM / AM	2 July 1999 (aged 19)	(Italy) Internazionale	2018	2023	36	6
24	Alessandro Florenzi (Vice-Captain)	(Italy)	RB / CM / RW	11 March 1991 (aged 28)	(Italy) Youth Sector	2011	2023	261	28
27	Javier Pastore	(Argentina)	CM / AM / LW	20 June 1989 (aged 30)	(France) Paris Saint-Germain	2018	2023	17	4
42	Steven Nzonzi	(France)	DM / CM	15 December 1988 (aged 30)	(Spain) Sevilla	2018	2022	39	1
53	Alessio Riccardi	(Italy)	CM / RM / DM	3 April 2001 (aged 18)	(Italy) Youth Sector	2019		1	0
Forwards
8	Diego Perotti	(Argentina)	AM / LW / RW	26 July 1988 (aged 30)	(Italy) Genoa	2016	2021	112	26
9	Edin Džeko	(Bosnia and Herzegovina)	CF	17 March 1986 (aged 33)	(England) Manchester City	2015	2020	180	87
14	Patrik Schick	(Czech Republic)	CF / RW	24 January 1996 (aged 23)	(Italy) Sampdoria	2017	2018	58	8
17	Cengiz Ünder	(Turkey)	RW	14 July 1997 (aged 21)	(Turkey) İstanbul Başakşehir	2017	2022	64	14
34	Justin Kluivert	(Netherlands)	LW / RW	5 May 1999 (aged 20)	(Netherlands) Ajax	2018	2023	35	2
60	Žan Celar	(Slovenia)	CF	14 March 1999 (aged 20)	(Slovenia) Maribor	2017	2021	1	0
92	Stephan El Shaarawy	(Italy)	LW	27 October 1992 (aged 26)	(Italy) Milan	2016	2022	138	40
Players transferred during the season
3	Luca Pellegrini	(Italy)	LB	7 March 1999 (aged 20)	(Italy) Youth Sector	2018	2022	6	0
6	Kevin Strootman	(Netherlands)	DM / CM	13 February 1990 (aged 29)	(Netherlands) PSV Eindhoven	2013	2022	148	15

== Transfers ==
=== In ===
Date	Pos.	Player	Age	Moving from	Fee	Notes	Source
28 May 2018	MF	(Croatia) Ante Ćorić	21	(Croatia) Dinamo Zagreb	€6M		
31 May 2018	DF	(Spain) Iván Marcano	30	(Portugal) Porto	Free		
22 June 2018	FW	(Netherlands) Justin Kluivert	19	(Netherlands) Ajax	€17.25M		
22 June 2018	GK	(Italy) Antonio Mirante	34	(Italy) Bologna	€4M		
26 June 2018	MF	(Argentina) Javier Pastore	29	(France) Paris Saint-Germain	€24.7M		
26 June 2018	DF	(Italy) Davide Santon	27	(Italy) Internazionale	€9.5M	Part of Radja Nainggolan transfer	
26 June 2018	MF	(Italy) Nicolò Zaniolo	18	(Italy) Internazionale	€4.5M	Part of Radja Nainggolan transfer	
28 June 2018	DF	(France) William Bianda	18	(France) Lens	€6M	€6M + €5M in bonuses	
1 July 2018	DF	(Brazil) Leandro Castán	31	(Italy) Cagliari	Free	Loan return	
1 July 2018	DF	(Slovakia) Norbert Gyömbér	25	(Italy) Bari	Free	Loan return	
1 July 2018	FW	(Italy) Marco Tumminello	19	(Italy) Crotone	Free	Loan return	
9 July 2018	GK	(Brazil) Daniel Fuzato	21	(Brazil) Palmeiras	€450,000		
24 July 2018	GK	(Sweden) Robin Olsen	28	(Denmark) Copenhagen	€8.5M	€8.5M + €3.5M in bonuses	
14 August 2018	MF	(France) Steven Nzonzi	29	(Spain) Sevilla	€26.65M	€26.65M + €4M in bonuses	

==== Loans in ====
Date	Pos.	Player	Age	Moving from	Fee	Notes	Source
8 June 2018	MF	(Italy) Bryan Cristante	23	(Italy) Atalanta	€5M	One-year loan with a compulsory option to buy for €15M + €10M in bonuses	

=== Out ===
Date	Pos.	Player	Age	Moving to	Fee	Notes	Source
1 July 2018	GK	(Romania) Bogdan Lobonț	40	Retired			
21 June 2018	DF	(Italy) Arturo Calabresi	22	(Italy) Bologna	Undisclosed		
22 June 2018	FW	(Italy) Marco Tumminello	19	(Italy) Atalanta	€6M	Buy-back options for the next two summers for €10M and €13M respectively	
22 June 2018	GK	(Poland) Łukasz Skorupski	27	(Italy) Bologna	€9M		
26 June 2018	MF	(Belgium) Radja Nainggolan	30	(Italy) Internazionale	€24M	€24M + Davide Santon and Nicolò Zaniolo	
1 July 2018	DF	(Argentina) Jonathan Silva	24	(Portugal) Sporting CP	Free	Loan return	
19 July 2018	GK	(Brazil) Alisson	25	(England) Liverpool	€62.5M	€62.5M + €10M in bonuses	
3 August 2018	DF	(Brazil) Leandro Castán	31	(Brazil) Vasco da Gama	Free		
28 August 2018	MF	(Netherlands) Kevin Strootman	28	(France) Marseille	€25M	€25M + €3M in bonuses	

==== Loans out ====
Date	Pos.	Player	Age	Moving to	Fee	Notes	Source
6 July 2018	DF	(Brazil) Bruno Peres	28	(Brazil) São Paulo	Loan	Loan with a €6M option to buy	
10 July 2018	FW	(Nigeria) Umar Sadiq	21	(Scotland) Rangers	Loan		
17 July 2018	FW	(Italy) Mirko Antonucci	19	(Italy) Pescara	Loan		
20 July 2018	DF	(Italy) Elio Capradossi	22	(Italy) Spezia	Loan		
20 July 2018	MF	(Brazil) Gerson	21	(Italy) Fiorentina	Loan		
19 July 2018	FW	(Argentina) Ezequiel Ponce	21	(Greece) AEK Athens	Loan	Loan with an option to buy	
20 July 2018	DF	(Senegal) Moustapha Seck	22	(Netherlands) Almere City	Loan		
20 July 2018	FW	(Italy) Edoardo Soleri	20	(Netherlands) Almere City	Loan		
27 July 2018	FW	(France) Grégoire Defrel	27	(Italy) Sampdoria	Loan	Loan with an option to buy	
8 August 2018	FW	(Italy) Daniele Verde	22	(Spain) Valladolid	Loan		
20 August 2018	MF	(France) Maxime Gonalons	29	(Spain) Sevilla	Loan		

== Pre-season and friendlies ==
14 July 2018 Friendly	Latina (Italy)	0–9	(Italy) Roma	Latina, Italy
12:30 CEST (UTC+2:00)		Report	Schick 5', 24' (pen.), 39'; Marcano 11'; Lu. Pellegrini 22'; Lo. Pellegrini 29'; Manes 65' (o.g.); Džeko 76', 81'	Stadium: Stadio Domenico Francioni; Referee: Matteo Centi

20 July 2018 Friendly	Roma (Italy)	1–1	(Italy) Avellino	Frosinone, Italy
13:00 CEST (UTC+2:00)	Schick 57'	Report	Paghera 90+2'	Stadium: Stadio Benito Stirpe; Referee: Daniele Paterna

25 July 2018 ICC	Roma (Italy)	1–4	(England) Tottenham Hotspur	San Diego, United States
22:05 CEST (UTC+2:00)	Schick 3'; Lu. Pellegrini (yellow card) 34'	Report	Llorente 9', 18'; Lucas 28', 44'	Stadium: SDCCU Stadium; Attendance: 18,861; Referee: Alejandro Mariscal (United States)

31 July 2018 ICC	Barcelona (Spain)	2–4	(Italy) Roma	Arlington, United States
22:05 CEST (UTC+2:00)	Rafinha 6'; Vidal (yellow card) 37'; Malcom 49'	Report	Lo. Pellegrini (yellow card) 27'; El Shaarawy 35'; Manolas (yellow card) 37'; Florenzi 78'; Cristante 83'; Perotti 86' (pen.)	Stadium: AT&T Stadium; Attendance: 54,726; Referee: José Carlos Rivero (United States)

7 August 2018 ICC	Real Madrid (Spain)	2–1	(Italy) Roma	East Rutherford, United States
20:05 CEST (UTC+2:00)	Asensio 2'; Bale 15'; Ceballos (yellow card) 50'	Report	Strootman 83'	Stadium: MetLife Stadium; Attendance: 51,528; Referee: Mark Geiger (United States)

6 September 2018 Friendly	Benevento (Italy)	2–1	(Italy) Roma	Benevento, Italy
18:00 CEST (UTC+2:00)	Insigne 52'; Asencio 77'	Report	Bucri 78'	Stadium: Stadio Ciro Vigorito

== Competitions ==
=== Serie A ===
==== League table ====
Pos	Team	Pld	W	D	L	GF	GA	GD	Pts	Qualification or relegation
4	Inter Milan	38	20	9	9	57	33	+24	69 (Note: Atalanta finished ahead of Internazionale on head-to-head points: Atalanta 4–1 Internazionale, Internazionale 0–0 Atalanta.)	Qualification for the Champions League group stage
5	Milan (Note: Milan were excluded from UEFA competitions over financial fair play violation.)	38	19	11	8	55	36	+19	68	
6	Roma	38	18	12	8	66	48	+18	66	Qualification for the Europa League group stage
7	Torino	38	16	15	7	52	37	+15	63	Qualification for the Europa League second qualifying round
8	Lazio	38	17	8	13	56	46	+10	57 (Note: Lazio were deducted 2 points by the Italian Football Federation.)	Qualification for the Europa League group stage (Note: Lazio qualified for the Europa League group stage by winning the 2018–19 Coppa Italia)

Source: Serie A, Soccerway
Rules for classification: 1) Points; 2) Head-to-head points; 3) Head-to-head goal difference; 4) Goal difference; 5) Goals scored; 6) Draw. (Note: Head-to-head record is used only after all the matches between the teams in question have been played).

==== Results summary ====
Overall								Home						Away					
Pld	W	D	L	GF	GA	GD	Pts	W	D	L	GF	GA	GD	W	D	L	GF	GA	GD
38	18	12	8	66	48	+18	66	12	5	2	43	26	+17	6	7	6	23	22	+1

Last updated: 26 May 2019.
Source: Competitive matches

==== Results by round ====
Round	1	2	3	4	5	6	7	8	9	10	11	12	13	14	15	16	17	18	19	20	21	22	23	24	25	26	27	28	29	30	31	32	33	34	35	36	37	38
Ground	A	H	A	H	A	H	H	A	H	A	A	H	A	H	A	H	A	H	A	H	A	H	A	H	A	A	H	A	H	H	A	H	A	H	A	H	A	H
Result	W	D	L	D	L	W	W	W	L	D	D	W	L	D	D	W	L	W	W	W	D	D	W	W	W	L	W	L	L	D	W	W	D	W	D	W	D	W
Position	5	5	9	9	14	10	9	6	7	8	9	6	7	7	8	7	10	7	6	5	5	6	6	5	5	5	5	5	7	8	6	5	6	5	6	6	6	6

Updated to match(es) played on 26 May 2019. Source: Competitive matches
A = Away; H = Home; W = Win; D = Draw; L = Loss

==== Matches ====
19 August 2018 1	Torino	0–1	Roma	Turin
18:00 CEST (UTC+02:00)	Falque (yellow card) 57'	Report	Fazio (yellow card) 30'; Florenzi (yellow card) 84'; Džeko 89', (yellow card) 90'	Stadium: Stadio Olimpico Grande Torino; Attendance: 19,558; Referee: Marco Di Bello

27 August 2018 2	Roma	3–3	Atalanta	Rome
20:30 CEST (UTC+02:00)	Pastore 2'; Nzonzi (yellow card) 58'; Florenzi 60'; Manolas 82'	Report	Castagne 19'; Rigoni 22', 38'; Djimsiti (yellow card) 81'	Stadium: Stadio Olimpico; Attendance: 41,725; Referee: Michael Fabbri

31 August 2018 3	Milan	2–1	Roma	Milan
20:30 CEST (UTC+02:00)	Kessié 40'; Cutrone 90+5'	Report	Fazio 59'; Cristante (yellow card) 77'; De Rossi (yellow card) 88'	Stadium: San Siro; Attendance: 57,789; Referee: Marco Guida

16 September 2018 4	Roma	2–2	Chievo	Rome
12:30 CEST (UTC+02:00)	El Shaarawy 10'; Cristante 30'; De Rossi (yellow card) 78'	Report	Birsa 52'; Rossettini (yellow card) 74'; Stępiński 83'	Stadium: Stadio Olimpico; Attendance: 39,849; Referee: Paolo Mazzoleni

23 September 2018 5	Bologna	2–0	Roma	Bologna
15:00 CEST (UTC+02:00)	Mattiello 36'; Santander 59'; Mbaye (yellow card) 90+1'; De Maio (yellow card) 90+3'	Report	De Rossi (yellow card) 30'; Cristante (yellow card) 33'; Fazio (yellow card) 63'; Lo. Pellegrini (yellow card) 79'	Stadium: Stadio Renato Dall'Ara; Attendance: 20,067; Referee: Davide Massa

26 September 2018 6	Roma	4–0	Frosinone	Rome
21:00 CEST (UTC+02:00)	Ünder 2'; Pastore 28'; El Shaarawy 35'; Kolarov 87'	Report	Campbell (yellow card) 90+1'	Stadium: Stadio Olimpico; Attendance: 34,380; Referee: Marco Di Bello

29 September 2018 7	Roma	3–1	Lazio	Rome
15:00 CEST (UTC+02:00)	Lo. Pellegrini 45', (yellow card) 66'; Olsen (yellow card) 57'; Džeko (yellow card) 62'; Kolarov 71'; Fazio 86'	Report	Immobile 67'; Badelj (yellow card) 70'	Stadium: Stadio Olimpico; Attendance: 47,600; Referee: Gianluca Rocchi

6 October 2018 8	Empoli	0–2	Roma	Empoli
20:30 CEST (UTC+02:00)	Bennacer (yellow card) 35'; Silvestre (yellow card) 83'	Report	Nzonzi 36'; Lu. Pellegrini (yellow card) 49'; Džeko 85'	Stadium: Stadio Carlo Castellani; Attendance: 10,670; Referee: Paolo Mazzoleni

20 October 2018 9	Roma	0–2	SPAL	Rome
15:00 CEST (UTC+02:00)	Lu. Pellegrini (yellow card) 37'; Ünder (yellow card) 62'; Fazio (yellow card) 82'	Report	Missiroli (yellow card) 30'; Petagna 38' (pen.); Bonifazi 56'; Paloschi (yellow card) 64'; Everton Luiz (yellow card) 69'; Milinković-Savić (yellow card) 75' (yellow-red card) 75'	Stadium: Stadio Olimpico; Attendance: 39,838; Referee: Luca Pairetto

28 October 2018 10	Napoli	1–1	Roma	Naples
20:30 CET (UTC+01:00)	Mertens 90'	Report	El Shaarawy 14'; Džeko (yellow card) 55'; Nzonzi (yellow card) 58'; Manolas (yellow card) 68'; Olsen (yellow card) 80'; Lo. Pellegrini (yellow card) 80'	Stadium: Stadio San Paolo; Attendance: 30,037; Referee: Davide Massa

3 November 2018 11	Fiorentina	1–1	Roma	Florence
18:00 CET (UTC+01:00)	Veretout 33' (pen.), (yellow card) 77'; Biraghi (yellow card) 67'; Vitor Hugo (yellow card) 90'	Report	Nzonzi (yellow card) 28'; Fazio (yellow card) 37'; Florenzi 85'; Lo. Pellegrini (yellow card) 87'	Stadium: Stadio Artemio Franchi; Attendance: 30,590; Referee: Luca Banti

11 November 2018 12	Roma	4–1	Sampdoria	Rome
15:00 CET (UTC+01:00)	Juan Jesus 19'; Florenzi (yellow card) 40'; Schick 59'; El Shaarawy 72', 90+3'	Report	Linetty (yellow card) 18'; Defrel 89'	Stadium: Stadio Olimpico; Attendance: 37,582; Referee: Massimiliano Irrati

24 November 2018 13	Udinese	1–0	Roma	Udine
15:00 CET (UTC+01:00)	De Paul 54', (yellow card) 64'; Behrami (yellow card) 65'	Report		Stadium: Dacia Arena; Attendance: 21,986; Referee: Michael Fabbri

2 December 2018 14	Roma	2–2	Internazionale	Rome
20:30 CET (UTC+01:00)	Ünder 51'; Kolarov 74' (pen.), (yellow card) 79'	Report	Keita 37'; Asamoah (yellow card) 48'; Icardi 66'	Stadium: Stadio Olimpico; Attendance: 41,009; Referee: Gianluca Rocchi

8 December 2018 15	Cagliari	2–2	Roma	Cagliari
18:00 CET (UTC+01:00)	Faragò (yellow card) 64'; Ioniță 84'; Srna (red card) 90+4'; Ceppitelli (yellow card) 90+4' (red card) 90+4'; Sau 90+5', (yellow card) 90+6'	Report	Cristante 14', (yellow card) 47'; Kolarov 41'	Stadium: Sardegna Arena; Attendance: 14,938; Referee: Paolo Mazzoleni

16 December 2018 16	Roma	3–2	Genoa	Rome
20:30 CET (UTC+01:00)	Fazio 31'; Kluivert 45'; Zaniolo (yellow card) 48'; Cristante 59'; Schick (yellow card) 87'	Report	Zukanović (yellow card) 14'; Piątek 17'; Hiljemark 33'; Rolón (yellow card) 90+3'	Stadium: Stadio Olimpico; Attendance: 29,111; Referee: Marco Di Bello

22 December 2018 17	Juventus	1–0	Roma	Turin
20:30 CET (UTC+01:00)	Mandžukić 35'	Report	Nzonzi (yellow card) 40'; Schick (yellow card) 81'; Zaniolo (yellow card) 90+5'	Stadium: Allianz Stadium; Attendance: 40,069; Referee: Davide Massa

26 December 2018 18	Roma	3–1	Sassuolo	Rome
18:00 CET (UTC+01:00)	Perotti 8' (pen.); Schick 23'; Florenzi (yellow card) 27'; Zaniolo 59'	Report	Ferrari (yellow card) 8'; Babacar 90'	Stadium: Stadio Olimpico; Attendance: 35,893; Referee: Piero Giacomelli

29 December 2018 19	Parma	0–2	Roma	Parma
15:00 CET (UTC+01:00)	Barillà (yellow card) 67'	Report	Kolarov (yellow card) 45+1'; Cristante 58'; Ünder 75'	Stadium: Stadio Ennio Tardini; Attendance: 17,997; Referee: Gianluca Manganiello

19 January 2019 20	Roma	3–2	Torino	Rome
15:00 CET (UTC+01:00)	Zaniolo 15'; Kolarov 34' (pen.); Kluivert (yellow card) 61'; Cristante (yellow card) 66'; El Shaarawy 73'	Report	Rincón 51', (yellow card) 90+1'; Ansaldi 67'; Lyanco (yellow card) 70'; Belotti (yellow card) 90+2'	Stadium: Stadio Olimpico; Attendance: 32,978; Referee: Piero Giacomelli

27 January 2019 21	Atalanta	3–3	Roma	Bergamo
15:00 CET (UTC+01:00)	Castagne 45'; Toloi 59'; Zapata 71'	Report	Džeko 3', 33'; Cristante (yellow card) 23'; Manolas (yellow card) 35'; El Shaarawy 40'; Nzonzi (yellow card) 64'	Stadium: Stadio Atleti Azzurri d'Italia; Attendance: 19,459; Referee: Gianpaolo Calvarese

3 February 2019 22	Roma	1–1	Milan	Rome
20:30 CET (UTC+01:00)	Manolas (yellow card) 18'; Zaniolo (yellow card) 21', (goal) 46'; Lo. Pellegrini (yellow card) 63'; Kolarov (yellow card) 90+3'	Report	Piątek 26'; Suso (yellow card) 40'; Paquetá (yellow card) 53'; Kessié (yellow card) 72'	Stadium: Stadio Olimpico; Attendance: 37,581; Referee: Fabio Maresca

8 February 2019 23	Chievo	0–3	Roma	Verona
20:30 CET (UTC+01:00)	Barba (yellow card) 21'	Report	El Shaarawy 9'; Cristante (yellow card) 14'; Zaniolo (yellow card) 17'; Džeko 18'; Kolarov 51'	Stadium: Stadio Marc'Antonio Bentegodi; Attendance: 12,000; Referee: Rosario Abisso

18 February 2019 24	Roma	2–1	Bologna	Rome
20:30 CET (UTC+01:00)	Cristante (yellow card) 34'; Florenzi (yellow card) 40'; Kolarov 55' (pen.); Fazio 73'; Manolas (yellow card) 90+3'	Report	Danilo (yellow card) 12'; Pulgar (yellow card) 24'; Edera (yellow card) 43'; Sansone 84'; Dijks (yellow card) 90+2'	Stadium: Stadio Olimpico; Attendance: 31,572; Referee: Marco Di Bello

23 February 2019 25	Frosinone	2–3	Roma	Frosinone
20:30 CET (UTC+01:00)	Ciano 5'; Goldaniga (yellow card) 68'; Cassata (yellow card) 78'; Pinamonti 80'	Report	Džeko 30', 90+5', (yellow card) 42'; Lo. Pellegrini 31'; El Shaarawy (yellow card) 39'	Stadium: Stadio Benito Stirpe; Attendance: 14,057; Referee: Gianluca Manganiello

2 March 2019 26	Lazio	3–0	Roma	Rome
20:30 CET (UTC+01:00)	Caicedo 12'; Lulić (yellow card) 55'; Immobile 73' (pen.); Milinković-Savić (yellow card) 77'; Cataldi 89', (yellow card) 90'; Radu (yellow card) 90+3'	Report	Juan Jesus (yellow card) 5'; Fazio (yellow card) 72'; Džeko (yellow card) 90+2'; Kolarov (yellow card) 90+3' (yellow-red card) 90+3'	Stadium: Stadio Olimpico; Attendance: 53,112; Referee: Paolo Mazzoleni

11 March 2019 27	Roma	2–1	Empoli	Rome
20:30 CET (UTC+01:00)	El Shaarawy 9', (yellow card) 62'; Florenzi (yellow card) 13' (yellow-red card) 80'; Cristante (yellow card) 13'; Schick 33'	Report	Juan Jesus 12' (o.g.); Acquah (yellow card) 37'	Stadium: Stadio Olimpico; Attendance: 34,508; Referee: Fabio Maresca

16 March 2019 28	SPAL	2–1	Roma	Ferrara
18:00 CET (UTC+01:00)	Vicari (yellow card) 5'; Fares 22', (yellow card) 54'; Cionek (yellow card) 52'; Petagna 60' (pen.); Missiroli (yellow card) 64'	Report	Nzonzi (yellow card) 40'; Džeko (yellow card) 45+2'; Perotti 53' (pen.), (yellow card) 63'; Juan Jesus (yellow card) 57'; Cristante (yellow card) 69'	Stadium: Stadio Paolo Mazza; Attendance: 15,089; Referee: Gianluca Rocchi

31 March 2019 29	Roma	1–4	Napoli	Rome
15:00 CEST (UTC+02:00)	Schick (yellow card) 13'; Manolas (yellow card) 37'; Džeko (yellow card) 37'; Perotti 45+4' (pen.); Kolarov (yellow card) 66'	Report	Milik 2', (yellow card) 43'; Maksimović (yellow card) 17'; Mertens 50'; Verdi 55'; Younes 81'	Stadium: Stadio Olimpico; Attendance: 36,525; Referee: Gianpaolo Calvarese

3 April 2019 30	Roma	2–2	Fiorentina	Rome
21:00 CEST (UTC+02:00)	Kolarov (yellow card) 3'; Zaniolo 14'; Perotti 57', (yellow card) 70'; Karsdorp (yellow card) 71'	Report	Pezzella 12'; Gerson 51'; Simeone (yellow card) 66'; Milenković (yellow card) 70'; Veretout (yellow card) 84'; Biraghi (yellow card) 88'	Stadium: Stadio Olimpico; Attendance: 30,123; Referee: Davide Massa

6 April 2019 31	Sampdoria	0–1	Roma	Genoa
20:30 CEST (UTC+02:00)	Saponara (yellow card) 38'; Gabbiadini (yellow card) 88'	Report	Schick (yellow card) 42'; Kolarov (yellow card) 43'; De Rossi 75'	Stadium: Stadio Luigi Ferraris; Attendance: 19,594; Referee: Paolo Mazzoleni

13 April 2019 32	Roma	1–0	Udinese	Rome
18:00 CEST (UTC+02:00)	Juan Jesus (yellow card) 36'; Džeko 67', (yellow card) 81'	Report	D'Alessandro (yellow card) 59'; Musso (yellow card) 63'; Troost-Ekong (yellow card) 77'	Stadium: Stadio Olimpico; Attendance: 34,449; Referee: Marco Di Bello

20 April 2019 33	Internazionale	1–1	Roma	Milan
20:30 CEST (UTC+02:00)	Perišić 61'; Vecino (yellow card) 62'	Report	El Shaarawy 14'; Cristante (yellow card) 76'; Zaniolo (yellow card) 84'	Stadium: San Siro; Attendance: 60,013; Referee: Marco Guida

27 April 2019 34	Roma	3–0	Cagliari	Rome
18:00 CEST (UTC+02:00)	Fazio 5'; Pastore 8'; Kolarov 86'; Manolas (yellow card) 88'	Report	Ceppitelli (yellow card) 36'; Pisacane (yellow card) 61'	Stadium: Stadio Olimpico; Attendance: 35,964; Referee: Gianluca Manganiello

5 May 2019 35	Genoa	1–1	Roma	Genoa
18:00 CEST (UTC+02:00)	Romero 90+1'; Rolón (yellow card) 90+6'	Report	Zaniolo (yellow card) 51'; El Shaarawy 82'; Kluivert (yellow card) 84'	Stadium: Stadio Luigi Ferraris; Attendance: 20,703; Referee: Paolo Mazzoleni

12 May 2019 36	Roma	2–0	Juventus	Rome
20:30 CEST (UTC+02:00)	Džeko (yellow card) 51', (goal) 90+2'; Zaniolo (yellow card) 75'; Florenzi 79'; Kolarov (yellow card) 90+1'	Report	Can (yellow card) 74'	Stadium: Stadio Olimpico; Attendance: 50,825; Referee: Davide Massa

18 May 2019 37	Sassuolo	0–0	Roma	Reggio Emilia
20:30 CEST (UTC+02:00)	Magnanelli (yellow card) 41'; Brignola (yellow card) 90+6'	Report	Zaniolo (yellow card) 40'; Fazio (yellow card) 49'; Juan Jesus (yellow card) 52'; Nzonzi (yellow card) 86'	Stadium: Mapei Stadium – Città del Tricolore; Attendance: 12,914; Referee: Fabio Maresca

26 May 2019 38	Roma	2–1	Parma	Rome
20:30 CEST (UTC+02:00)	Gagliolo 35' (o.g.); Perotti (yellow card) 41', (goal) 89'; Lo. Pellegrini (yellow card) 78'	Report	Kucka (yellow card) 38'; Gervinho 86'	Stadium: Stadio Olimpico; Attendance: 62,304; Referee: Paolo Mazzoleni

=== Coppa Italia ===
14 January 2019 Round of 16	Roma	4–0	Virtus Entella	Rome
21:00 CET (UTC+01:00)	Schick 1', 47'; Marcano (yellow card) 16', (goal) 45+2'; Pastore 75'	Report	Eramo (yellow card) 33'; Baroni (yellow card) 45+1'	Stadium: Stadio Olimpico; Attendance: 20,984; Referee: Aleandro Di Paolo

30 January 2019 Quarter-finals	Fiorentina	7–1	Roma	Florence
18:15 CET (UTC+01:00)	Chiesa 7', 18', 74'; Muriel 33', (yellow card) 69'; Benassi 66'; Simeone 79', 89'	Report	Zaniolo (yellow card) 11'; Kolarov 28'; El Shaarawy (yellow card) 31'; Pellegrini (yellow card) 71'; Džeko (red card) 72'	Stadium: Stadio Artemio Franchi; Attendance: 21,190; Referee: Gianluca Manganiello

=== UEFA Champions League ===
==== Group stage ====
Pos	Team	Pld	W	D	L	GF	GA	GD	Pts	Qualification	RMA	ROM	PLZ	CSKA
1	(Spain) Real Madrid	6	4	0	2	12	5	+7	12	Advance to knockout phase	—	3–0	2–1	0–3
2	(Italy) Roma	6	3	0	3	11	8	+3	9	Advance to knockout phase	0–2	—	5–0	3–0
3	(Czech Republic) Viktoria Plzeň	6	2	1	3	7	16	−9	7 (Note: Head-to-head points: Viktoria Plzeň 4, CSKA Moscow 1.)	Transfer to Europa League	0–5	2–1	—	2–2
4	(Russia) CSKA Moscow	6	2	1	3	8	9	−1	7		1–0	1–2	1–2	—

Source: UEFA
Rules for classification: Group stage tiebreakers
Notes:

19 September 2018 1	Real Madrid (Spain)	3–0	(Italy) Roma	Madrid, Spain
21:00 CEST (UTC+02:00)	Ramos (yellow card) 23'; Isco 45'; Bale 58'; Mariano 90+2'	Report	De Rossi (yellow card) 44'; Džeko (yellow card) 76'	Stadium: Santiago Bernabéu; Attendance: 69,251; Referee: Björn Kuipers (Netherlands)

2 October 2018 2	Roma (Italy)	5–0	(Czech Republic) Viktoria Plzeň	Rome, Italy
21:00 CEST (UTC+02:00)	Džeko 3', 40', 90+2'; Ünder 64'; Kluivert 73'; Schick (yellow card) 88'	Report	Hejda (yellow card) 51'	Stadium: Stadio Olimpico; Attendance: 41,243; Referee: Paweł Raczkowski (Poland)

23 October 2018 3	Roma (Italy)	3–0	(Russia) CSKA Moscow	Rome, Italy
21:00 CEST (UTC+02:00)	Džeko 30', 43'; Ünder 50'	Report	Nababkin (yellow card) 72'; Sigurðsson (yellow card) 88'	Stadium: Stadio Olimpico; Attendance: 46,005; Referee: Tasos Sidiropoulos (Greece)

7 November 2018 4	CSKA Moscow (Russia)	1–2	(Italy) Roma	Moscow, Russia
18:55 CET (UTC+01:00)	Magnússon (yellow card) 30' (yellow-red card) 56'; Sigurðsson 50'	Report	Manolas 4'; Lo. Pellegrini 59'	Stadium: Luzhniki Stadium; Attendance: 64,454; Referee: Cüneyt Çakır (Turkey)
Note: CSKA Moscow played their home matches at the Luzhniki Stadium, instead of their regular stadium, the VEB Arena.

27 November 2018 5	Roma (Italy)	0–2	(Spain) Real Madrid	Rome, Italy
21:00 CET (UTC+01:00)	Zaniolo (yellow card) 42'	Report	Modrić (yellow card) 21'; Bale 47'; Vázquez 59'; Varane (yellow card) 90+4'	Stadium: Stadio Olimpico; Attendance: 59,124; Referee: Clément Turpin (France)

12 December 2018 6	Viktoria Plzeň (Czech Republic)	2–1	(Italy) Roma	Plzeň, Czech Republic
18:55 CET (UTC+01:00)	Limberský (yellow card) 22'; Kovařík 62'; Chorý 72'	Report	Ünder 68'; Kluivert (yellow card) 79'; Lu. Pellegrini (yellow card) 89' (yellow-red card) 90+2'	Stadium: Doosan Arena; Attendance: 11,217; Referee: Anthony Taylor (England)

==== Knockout phase ====
===== Round of 16 =====
12 February 2019 First leg	Roma (Italy)	2–1	(Portugal) Porto	Rome, Italy
21:00 CET (UTC+01:00)	Zaniolo 70', 76'; El Shaarawy (yellow card) 88'	Report	Herrera (yellow card) 74'; Adrián 79'	Stadium: Stadio Olimpico; Attendance: 51,727; Referee: Danny Makkelie (Netherlands)

6 March 2019 Second leg	Porto (Portugal)	3–1 (a.e.t.) (4–3 agg.)	(Italy) Roma	Porto, Portugal
21:00 CET (UTC+01:00)	Herrera (yellow card) 18'; Soares 26'; Pereira (yellow card) 45+2'; Marega 52'; Pepe (yellow card) 58'; Telles 117' (pen.), (yellow card) 117'	Report	Zaniolo (yellow card) 15'; De Rossi 37' (pen.); Karsdorp (yellow card) 55'; Džeko (yellow card) 58'; Lo. Pellegrini (yellow card) 81'; Florenzi (yellow card) 116'	Stadium: Estádio do Dragão; Attendance: 49,029; Referee: Cüneyt Çakır (Turkey)

== Statistics ==
=== Appearances and goals ===
No.	Pos	Nat	Player	Total		Serie A		Coppa Italia		Champions League	
No.	Pos	Nat	Player	Apps	Goals	Apps	Goals	Apps	Goals	Apps	Goals
Goalkeepers
1	GK	(Sweden) SWE	Robin Olsen	35	0	27	0	2	0	6	0
63	GK	(Brazil) BRA	Daniel Fuzato	0	0	0	0	0	0	0	0
83	GK	(Italy) ITA	Antonio Mirante	13	0	11	0	0	0	2	0
Defenders
2	DF	(Netherlands) NED	Rick Karsdorp	14	0	7+4	0	1	0	1+1	0
5	DF	(Brazil) BRA	Juan Jesus	24	1	15+5	1	1	0	2+1	0
11	DF	(Serbia) SRB	Aleksandar Kolarov	43	9	32+1	8	2	1	7+1	0
15	DF	(Spain) ESP	Iván Marcano	13	1	9+1	0	0+1	1	2	0
18	DF	(Italy) ITA	Davide Santon	21	0	11+6	0	0	0	3+1	0
20	DF	(Argentina) ARG	Federico Fazio	42	5	31+3	5	2	0	6	0
28	DF	(France) FRA	William Bianda	0	0	0	0	0	0	0	0
44	DF	(Greece) GRE	Kostas Manolas	35	2	27	1	1	0	7	1
Midfielders
4	MF	(Italy) ITA	Bryan Cristante	44	4	26+9	4	2	0	5+2	0
7	MF	(Italy) ITA	Lorenzo Pellegrini	33	3	21+4	2	1+1	0	4+2	1
16	MF	(Italy) ITA	Daniele De Rossi	23	2	15+3	1	0+1	0	4	1
19	MF	(Croatia) CRO	Ante Ćorić	3	0	0+2	0	0	0	0+1	0
22	MF	(Italy) ITA	Nicolò Zaniolo	36	6	20+7	4	1+1	0	4+3	2
24	MF	(Italy) ITA	Alessandro Florenzi	38	3	24+5	3	1	0	6+2	0
27	MF	(Argentina) ARG	Javier Pastore	17	4	7+7	3	2	1	1	0
42	MF	(France) FRA	Steven Nzonzi	39	1	29+1	1	1	0	7+1	0
53	MF	(Italy) ITA	Alessio Riccardi	1	0	0	0	0+1	0	0	0
Forwards
8	FW	(Argentina) ARG	Diego Perotti	15	5	6+7	5	0	0	1+1	0
9	FW	(Bosnia and Herzegovina) BIH	Edin Džeko	40	14	28+5	9	0+1	0	6	5
14	FW	(Czech Republic) CZE	Patrik Schick	32	5	15+9	3	2	2	2+4	0
17	FW	(Turkey) TUR	Cengiz Ünder	33	6	17+9	3	1	0	5+1	3
34	FW	(Netherlands) NED	Justin Kluivert	35	2	14+15	1	1	0	3+2	1
60	FW	(Slovenia) SVN	Žan Celar	1	0	0+1	0	0	0	0	0
92	FW	(Italy) ITA	Stephan El Shaarawy	33	11	23+5	11	1	0	4	0
Players transferred out during the season
3	DF	(Italy) ITA	Luca Pellegrini	6	0	2+2	0	0	0	0+2	0
6	MF	(Netherlands) NED	Kevin Strootman	0	0	0	0	0	0	0	0

Last updated: 26 May 2019
Source: Competitions

=== Goalscorers ===
Rank	No.	Pos	Nat	Name	Serie A	Coppa Italia	UEFA CL	Total
1	9	FW	(Bosnia and Herzegovina)	Edin Džeko	9	0	5	14
2	92	FW	(Italy)	Stephan El Shaarawy	11	0	0	11
3	11	DF	(Serbia)	Aleksandar Kolarov	8	1	0	9
4	17	FW	(Turkey)	Cengiz Ünder	3	0	3	6
4	22	MF	(Italy)	Nicolò Zaniolo	4	0	2	6
6	8	FW	(Argentina)	Diego Perotti	5	0	0	5
6	14	FW	(Czech Republic)	Patrik Schick	3	2	0	5
6	20	DF	(Argentina)	Federico Fazio	5	0	0	5
9	4	MF	(Italy)	Bryan Cristante	4	0	0	4
10	27	MF	(Argentina)	Javier Pastore	3	1	0	4
11	7	MF	(Italy)	Lorenzo Pellegrini	2	0	1	3
11	24	MF	(Italy)	Alessandro Florenzi	3	0	0	3
13	16	MF	(Italy)	Daniele De Rossi	1	0	1	2
13	34	FW	(Netherlands)	Justin Kluivert	1	0	1	2
13	44	DF	(Greece)	Kostas Manolas	1	0	1	2
16	5	DF	(Brazil)	Juan Jesus	1	0	0	1
16	15	DF	(Spain)	Iván Marcano	0	1	0	1
16	42	MF	(France)	Steven Nzonzi	1	0	0	1
Own goal					1	0	0	1
Totals					66	5	14	85

Last updated: 26 May 2019

=== Clean sheets ===
Rank	No.	Pos	Nat	Name	Serie A	Coppa Italia	UEFA CL	Total
1	1	GK	(Sweden)	Robin Olsen	4	1	2	7
2	83	GK	(Italy)	Antonio Mirante	6	0	0	6
Totals					10	1	2	13

Last updated: 26 May 2019

=== Disciplinary record ===
No.	Pos	Nat	Name	Serie A			Coppa Italia			UEFA CL			Total		
No.	Pos	Nat	Name	Booked	(yellow card) (yellow-red card)	Sent off (straight red)	Booked	(yellow card) (yellow-red card)	Sent off (straight red)	Booked	(yellow card) (yellow-red card)	Sent off (straight red)	Booked	(yellow card) (yellow-red card)	Sent off (straight red)
1	GK	(Sweden)	Robin Olsen	2	0	0	0	0	0	0	0	0	2	0	0
63	GK	(Brazil)	Daniel Fuzato	0	0	0	0	0	0	0	0	0	0	0	0
83	GK	(Italy)	Antonio Mirante	0	0	0	0	0	0	0	0	0	0	0	0
2	DF	(Netherlands)	Rick Karsdorp	1	0	0	0	0	0	1	0	0	2	0	0
3	DF	(Italy)	Luca Pellegrini	2	0	0	0	0	0	0	1	0	2	1	0
5	DF	(Brazil)	Juan Jesus	4	0	0	0	0	0	0	0	0	4	0	0
11	DF	(Serbia)	Aleksandar Kolarov	6	1	0	0	0	0	0	0	0	6	1	0
15	DF	(Spain)	Iván Marcano	0	0	0	1	0	0	0	0	0	1	0	0
18	DF	(Italy)	Davide Santon	0	0	0	0	0	0	0	0	0	0	0	0
20	DF	(Argentina)	Federico Fazio	6	0	0	0	0	0	0	0	0	6	0	0
28	DF	(France)	William Bianda	0	0	0	0	0	0	0	0	0	0	0	0
44	DF	(Greece)	Kostas Manolas	6	0	0	0	0	0	0	0	0	6	0	0
4	MF	(Italy)	Bryan Cristante	10	0	0	0	0	0	0	0	0	10	0	0
6	MF	(Netherlands)	Kevin Strootman	0	0	0	0	0	0	0	0	0	0	0	0
7	MF	(Italy)	Lorenzo Pellegrini	6	0	0	1	0	0	1	0	0	8	0	0
16	MF	(Italy)	Daniele De Rossi	3	0	0	0	0	0	1	0	0	4	0	0
19	MF	(Croatia)	Ante Ćorić	0	0	0	0	0	0	0	0	0	0	0	0
22	MF	(Italy)	Nicolò Zaniolo	8	0	0	1	0	0	2	0	0	11	0	0
24	MF	(Italy)	Alessandro Florenzi	4	1	0	0	0	0	1	0	0	5	1	0
27	MF	(Argentina)	Javier Pastore	0	0	0	0	0	0	0	0	0	0	0	0
42	MF	(France)	Steven Nzonzi	7	0	0	0	0	0	0	0	0	7	0	0
8	FW	(Argentina)	Diego Perotti	3	0	0	0	0	0	0	0	0	3	0	0
9	FW	(Bosnia and Herzegovina)	Edin Džeko	9	0	0	0	0	1	2	0	0	11	0	1
14	FW	(Czech Republic)	Patrik Schick	4	0	0	0	0	0	1	0	0	5	0	0
17	FW	(Turkey)	Cengiz Ünder	1	0	0	0	0	0	0	0	0	1	0	0
34	FW	(Netherlands)	Justin Kluivert	2	0	0	0	0	0	1	0	0	3	0	0
92	FW	(Italy)	Stephan El Shaarawy	2	0	0	1	0	0	1	0	0	4	0	0
Totals				86	2	0	4	0	1	11	1	0	101	3	1

Last updated: 26 May 2019
