= 2013–14 AS Roma season =

Roma
2013–14 season
- President: James Pallotta
- Manager: Rudi Garcia
- Stadium: Stadio Olimpico
- Serie A: 2nd
- Coppa Italia: Semi-finals
- Top goalscorer: League: Mattia Destro (13); All: Mattia Destro (13)
- Highest home attendance: 54,097 vs Juventus (11 May 2014, Serie A)
- Lowest home attendance: 20,493 vs Sampdoria (9 January 2014, Coppa Italia)
- Average home league attendance: 40,436
Home colours	Away colours	Third colours

The 2013–14 season was Associazione Sportiva Roma's 86th in existence and 85th season in the top flight of Italian football. The pre-season started with the June hiring of Lille OSC manager Rudi Garcia. Garcia replaced caretaker manager Aurelio Andreazzoli who took charge after the sacking of Zdeněk Zeman in February 2013. Andreazzoli's reign had seen the continuation of a disappointing season, with the team ending up in 6th place in Serie A, whilst also losing 1–0 to regional rivals Lazio in the Coppa Italia final. As a result, Roma missed out on European competition for the second season in a row. The 2013–14 season, in contrast, saw one of Roma's best ever in Serie A, the club tallying an impressive 85 points and finishing second to Juventus, who won the league with a record-breaking 102 points. Roma's defense was significantly better than in previous seasons, with only 25 goals conceded and a total of 21 clean sheets, including nine in their first ten matches.

== Players ==
=== Squad information ===
Last updated on 18 May 2014
Appearances include league matches only

No.	Name	Nat	Position(s)	Date of birth (Age at end of season)	Signed from	Signed in	Apps.	Goals
Goalkeepers
1	Bogdan Lobonț	(Romania)	GK	18 January 1978 (aged 36)	(Romania) Dinamo București	2009	28	0
26	Morgan De Sanctis	(Italy)	GK	30 March 1977 (aged 37)	(Italy) Napoli	2013	36	0
28	Łukasz Skorupski	(Poland)	GK	5 May 1991 (aged 23)	(Poland) Górnik Zabrze	2013	2	0
Defenders
2	Rafael Toloi	(Brazil)	CB	10 October 1990 (aged 23)	(Brazil) São Paulo	2014	5	0
3	Dodô	(Brazil)	LB	6 February 1992 (aged 22)	(Brazil) Corinthians	2012	30	0
5	Leandro Castán	(Brazil)	CB	5 November 1986 (aged 27)	(Brazil) Corinthians	2012	66	1
13	Maicon	(Brazil)	RB	26 July 1981 (aged 32)	(England) Manchester City	2013	28	2
17	Medhi Benatia	(Morocco)	CB	17 April 1987 (aged 27)	(Italy) Udinese	2013	33	5
33	Tin Jedvaj	(Croatia)	CB	28 November 1995 (aged 18)	(Croatia) Dinamo Zagreb	2013	2	0
35	Vasilis Torosidis	(Greece)	RB / LB	10 June 1985 (aged 29)	(Greece) Olympiacos	2013	29	2
42	Federico Balzaretti	(Italy)	LB	6 December 1981 (aged 32)	(Italy) Palermo	2012	38	1
46	Alessio Romagnoli	(Italy)	CB	12 January 1995 (aged 19)	(Italy) Youth Sector	2012	13	1
Midfielders
6	Kevin Strootman	(Netherlands)	DM / CM	13 February 1990 (aged 24)	(Netherlands) PSV Eindhoven	2013	25	5
11	Rodrigo Taddei	(Brazil)	LM / RM / AM	6 March 1980 (aged 34)	(Italy) Siena	2005	224	25
15	Miralem Pjanić	(Bosnia and Herzegovina)	CM / AM	2 March 1990 (aged 24)	(France) Lyon	2011	92	12
16	Daniele De Rossi (Vice-Captain)	(Italy)	DM / CM	24 July 1983 (aged 30)	(Italy) Youth Sector	2001	338	34
24	Alessandro Florenzi	(Italy)	RB / CM / RW	11 March 1991 (aged 23)	(Italy) Youth Sector	2011	73	9
44	Radja Nainggolan	(Belgium)	DM / CM	4 May 1989 (aged 25)	(Italy) Cagliari	2014	17	2
95	Luca Mazzitelli	(Italy)	DM / CM	15 November 1995 (aged 18)	(Italy) Youth Sector	2013	1	0
Forwards
8	Adem Ljajić	(Serbia)	LW / RW / SS / AM	29 September 1991 (aged 22)	(Italy) Fiorentina	2013	28	6
10	Francesco Totti (Captain)	(Italy)	AM / LW / SS / CF / ST	27 September 1976 (aged 37)	(Italy) Youth Sector	1992	561	235
20	Michel Bastos	(Brazil)	LW / RW	2 August 1983 (aged 30)	(France) Lyon	2013	16	1
22	Mattia Destro	(Italy)	CF / ST	20 March 1991 (aged 23)	(Italy) Siena	2012	41	19
27	Gervinho	(Ivory Coast)	LW / RW / SS	27 May 1987 (aged 27)	(England) Arsenal	2013	33	9
88	Marco Borriello	(Italy)	CF / ST	18 June 1982 (aged 32)	(Italy) Milan	2010	52	12
94	Federico Ricci	(Italy)	RW / LW	27 May 1994 (aged 20)	(Italy) Youth Sector	2013	4	0
Players transferred during the season
4	Michael Bradley	(United States)	DM / CM	31 July 1987 (aged 26)	(Italy) Chievo	2012	41	2
7	Marquinho	(Brazil)	AM	3 July 1986 (aged 27)	(Brazil) Fluminense	2012	52	7
29	Nicolás Burdisso	(Argentina)	CB / RB	12 April 1981 (aged 33)	(Italy) Internazionale	2009	101	6

== Transfers ==
=== In ===
Date	Pos.	Name	From	Fee
21 June 2013	FW	(Italy) Gianluca Caprari	(Italy) Pescara	€2,000,000
21 June 2013	FW	(Italy) Mattia Destro	(Italy) Genoa	€4,500,000
21 June 2013	FW	(Italy) Giammario Piscitella	(Italy) Genoa	€1,500,000
21 June 2013	MF	(Italy) Valerio Verre	(Italy) Genoa	€2,500,000
10 July 2013	CB	(Croatia) Tin Jedvaj	(Croatia) Dinamo Zagreb	€5,000,000
13 July 2013	GK	(Poland) Łukasz Skorupski	(Poland) Górnik Zabrze	€890,000
14 July 2013	CB	(Morocco) Medhi Benatia	(Italy) Udinese	€13,500,000
15 July 2013	RB	(Brazil) Maicon	(England) Manchester City	Free
July 2013	AM	(Italy) Francesco Di Mariano	(Italy) Lecce	Undisclosed
19 July 2013	CM	(Netherlands) Kevin Strootman	(Netherlands) PSV Eindhoven	€17,000,000
25 July 2013	GK	(Italy) Morgan De Sanctis	(Italy) Napoli	€500,000
8 August 2013	FW	(Ivory Coast) Gervinho	(England) Arsenal	€8,000,000
28 August 2013	FW	(Serbia) Adem Ljajić	(Italy) Fiorentina	€11,000,000
30 January 2014	RB	(Serbia) Petar Golubović	(Serbia) OFK Beograd	€1,000,000
30 January 2014	ST	(Sweden) Valmir Berisha	(Sweden) Halmstads BK	€?
January 2014	FW	(Paraguay) Antonio Sanabria	(Spain) Barcelona	€4,800,000
January 2014	LW	(Serbia) Nemanja Radonjić	(Romania) Gheorghe Hagi football academy	Undisclosed

==== Loans in ====
Date	Pos.	Name	From	Fee
7 January 2014	DM	(Belgium) Radja Nainggolan	(Italy) Cagliari	€3,000,000
20 January 2014	LB	(Brazil) Michel Bastos	(United Arab Emirates) Al Ain	€1,100,000
31 January 2014	CB	(Brazil) Rafael Toloi	(Brazil) São Paulo	€?
30 January 2014	ST	(Slovakia) Tomáš Vestenický	(Slovakia) Nitra	€? (Option to buy)
30 January 2014	CM	(Italy) Alberto Tibolla	(Italy) Chievo	€0

Total spending: ▼€76,290,000

=== Out ===
Date	Pos.	Name	To	Fee
5 June 2013	GK	(Netherlands) Maarten Stekelenburg	(England) Fulham	€5,600,000
20 June 2013	DM	(Greece) Panagiotis Tachtsidis	(Italy) Genoa	€3,000,000
21 June 2013	DF	(Italy) Federico Barba	(Italy) Grosseto	€200,000
21 June 2013	RB	(Italy) Stefano Sabelli	(Italy) Bari	€300,000
21 June 2013	FW	(Italy) Mattia Montini	(Italy) Benevento	€60,000
29 June 2013	CM	(Italy) Simone Perrotta	Retired	–
8 July 2013	CM	(Italy) Matteo Brighi	(Italy) Torino	Free
18 July 2013	CB	(Brazil) Marquinhos	(France) Paris Saint-Germain	€35,000,000
22 July 2013	FW	(Spain) Bojan Krkić	(Spain) Barcelona	€12,000,000
18 August 2013	ST	(Italy) Dani Osvaldo	(England) Southampton	€15,100,000
28 August 2013	FW	(Argentina) Erik Lamela	(England) Tottenham Hotspur	€30,000,000
4 December 2013	GK	(Brazil) Júlio Sérgio	(Brazil) Comercial	Free
9 January 2014	DM	(United States) Michael Bradley	(Canada) Toronto	€7,350,000
23 January 2014	CB	(Argentina) Nicolás Burdisso	(Italy) Genoa	Free

==== Co-ownerships out ====
Date	Pos.	Name	To	Fee
1 July 2013	FW	(Italy) Matteo Politano	(Italy) Pescara	€500,000
1 July 2013	FW	(Italy) Giammario Piscitella	(Italy) Pescara	€1,500,000
1 July 2013	DF	(Italy) Luca Antei	(Italy) Sassuolo	€500,000
14 July 2013	MC	(Italy) Valerio Verre	(Italy) Palermo	€2,500,000
14 July 2013	FW	(Uruguay) Nicolás López	(Italy) Udinese	€1,000,000
31 July 2013	DF	(Italy) Simone Sini	(Italy) Perugia	Free

==== Loans out ====
Date	Pos.	Name	To	Fee
8 July 2013	GK	(Italy) Gianluca Curci	(Italy) Bologna	€2,500,000
8 July 2013	MF	(Italy) Marco D'Alessandro	(Italy) Cesena	€500,000
8 July 2013	LB	(Spain) José Ángel	(Spain) Real Sociedad	Free
8 July 2013	DF	(Italy) Paolo Frascatore	(Italy) Pescara	Free
8 July 2013	MF	(Italy) Amato Ciciretti	(Italy) L'Aquila	Free
8 July 2013	MF	(Italy) Sebastian Mladen	(Portugal) Olhanense	Free
8 July 2013	MF	(Italy) Matteo Ricci	(Italy) Grosseto	Free
8 July 2013	MF	(Italy) Alexis Ferrante	(Italy) L'Aquila	Free
8 July 2013	FW	(Italy) Filippo Scardina	(Italy) Poggibonsi	Free
8 July 2013	FW	(Italy) Marco Frediani	(Italy) L'Aquila	Free
29 August 2013	ST	(Ivory Coast) Gadji Tallo	(France) Ajaccio	Free
24 January 2014	MF	(Italy) Federico Viviani	(Italy) Latina	Free
24 January 2014	DF	(Italy) Alessandro Crescenzi	(Italy) Novara	Free
24 January 2014	FW	(Italy) Gianluca Caprari	(Italy) Pescara	Free
24 January 2014	GK	(Lithuania) Tomas Švedkauskas	(Italy) Pescara	Free
25 January 2014	FW	(Italy) Marco Borriello	(England) West Ham United	Free
30 January 2014	RB	(Serbia) Petar Golubović	(Italy) Novara	Free
30 January 2014	AM	(Argentina) Leandro Paredes	(Italy) Chievo	Free
January 2014	FW	(Paraguay) Antonio Sanabria	(Italy) Sassuolo	Free

Total income: ▲€117,610,000
Net income: ▲€40,120,000

== Pre-season and friendlies ==
17 July 2013 Friendly	Roma (Italy)	9–1	(Italy) Rapp. Locale Riscone	Riscone, Italy
17:30 CEST (UTC+02:00)	Florenzi 2', 31'; Borriello 6'; Totti 23'; Pjanić 41'; Lamela 43'; Osvaldo 53', 73'; Frediani 83'	Report	Nockler 36'	Stadium: Parco Sportivo

21 July 2013 Friendly	Roma (Italy)	1–1	(Turkey) Bursaspor	Riscone, Italy
17:30 CEST (UTC+02:00)	Osvaldo 61' (pen.)	Report	Šesták 55'	Stadium: Parco Sportivo

26 July 2013 Friendly	Aris (Greece)	1–2	(Italy) Roma	Thessaloniki, Greece
19:00 CEST (UTC+02:00)	Udoji 17'	Report	Burdisso 70'; Bradley 80'	Stadium: Kleanthis Vikelidis

31 July 2013 MLS All-Star Game	MLS All-Stars (United States) (Canada)	1–3	(Italy) Roma	Kansas City, United States
20:00 CDT (UTC-05:00)	Gonzalez 90+1'	Report	Strootman 4'; Florenzi 47'; Pjanić (yellow card) 54'; Tallo 68'; Marquinho (yellow card) 85'	Stadium: Sporting Park; Attendance: 21,175; Referee: Hilario Grajeda

7 August 2013 Friendly	Toronto FC (Canada)	1–4	(Italy) Roma	Toronto, Canada
20:00 EDT (UTC-04:00)	Burdisso 16' (o.g.)	Report	Florenzi 25'; Borriello 33'; Pjanić 67', 87'	Stadium: BMO Field; Attendance: 18,274

10 August 2013 Friendly	Roma (Italy)	1–2	(England) Chelsea	Washington, D.C., United States
20:00 EDT (UTC-04:00)	Lamela 20'	Report	Lampard 60'; Lukaku 88'	Stadium: RFK; Attendance: 25,615; Referee: Armando Villarreal

17 August 2013 Friendly	Ternana (Italy)	1–2	(Italy) Roma	Terni, Italy
--:-- CEST (UTC+02:00)				Stadium: Stadio Libero Liberati

== Competitions ==
=== Overall ===
Competition	Started round	Final position	First match	Last match
Serie A	Matchday 1	Runners-up	25 August 2013	18 May 2014
Coppa Italia	Round of 16	Semi-finals	9 January 2014	12 February 2014

Last updated: 18 May 2014

=== Serie A ===
==== League table ====
Pos	Team	Pld	W	D	L	GF	GA	GD	Pts	Qualification or relegation
1	Juventus (C)	38	33	3	2	80	23	+57	102	Qualification for the Champions League group stage
2	Roma	38	26	7	5	72	25	+47	85	Qualification for the Champions League group stage
3	Napoli	38	23	9	6	77	39	+38	78	Qualification for the Champions League play-off round
4	Fiorentina	38	19	8	11	65	44	+21	65	Qualification for the Europa League group stage (Note: Since the 2013–14 Coppa Italia champions Napoli and runners–up Fiorentina qualified for the 2014–15 European football season thus 4th, 5th and 6th in Serie A (barring any failure to receive a "UEFA licence" from the FIGC or a ban from European competition) would qualify for group stage, play-off round and third qualifying round respectively.)
5	Internazionale	38	15	15	8	62	39	+23	60	Qualification for the Europa League play-off round

Source: Serie A, Soccerway
Rules for classification: 1st points; 2nd head-to-head points; 3rd head-to-head goal difference; 4th goal difference; 5th number of goals scored; 6th public draw.
(Head-to-head record is applied for clubs with the same number of points only once all matches between said clubs have been played)
(C) Champions

==== Results summary ====
Overall								Home						Away					
Pld	W	D	L	GF	GA	GD	Pts	W	D	L	GF	GA	GD	W	D	L	GF	GA	GD
38	26	7	5	72	25	+47	85	15	3	1	44	9	+35	11	4	4	28	16	+12

Last updated: 18 May 2014.
Source: Competitive matches

==== Results by round ====
Round	1	2	3	4	5	6	7	8	9	10	11	12	13	14	15	16	17	18	19	20	21	22	23	24	25	26	27	28	29	30	31	32	33	34	35	36	37	38
Ground	A	H	A	H	A	H	A	H	A	H	A	H	H	A	H	A	H	A	H	H	A	A	H	A	H	A	H	A	H	A	H	A	H	A	H	A	H	A
Result	W	W	W	W	W	W	W	W	W	W	D	D	D	D	W	D	W	L	W	W	W	D	W	W	D	L	W	W	W	W	W	W	W	W	W	L	L	L
Position	3	3	2	1	1	1	1	1	1	1	1	1	2	2	2	2	2	2	2	2	2	2	2	2	2	2	2	2	2	2	2	2	2	2	2	2	2	2

Updated to match(es) played on 18 May 2014. Source: Competitive matches
A = Away; H = Home; W = Win; D = Draw; L = Loss

==== Matches ====
25 August 2013 1	Livorno	0–2	Roma	Livorno
20:45 CEST (UTC+02:00)	Schiattarella (yellow card) 45'	Report	Castán (yellow card) 22'; Benatia (yellow card) 61'; De Rossi 65'; Florenzi 67'	Stadium: Stadio Armando Picchi; Attendance: 12,940; Referee: Davide Massa

1 September 2013 2	Roma	3–0	Hellas Verona	Rome
18:00 CEST (UTC+02:00)	Balzaretti (yellow card) 30'; Florenzi (yellow card) 43'; Cacciatore 56' (o.g.); Pjanić 59'; Ljajić 66'	Report	Janković (yellow card) 45+1'; Juanito (yellow card) 68'	Stadium: Stadio Olimpico; Attendance: 28,000; Referee: Piero Giacomelli

16 September 2013 3	Parma	1–3	Roma	Parma
20:45 CEST (UTC+02:00)	Biabiany 39'; Lucarelli (yellow card) 41'; Cassano (yellow card) 50'; Cassani (yellow card) 84'; Gargano (yellow card) 90+3'	Report	Florenzi 47'; Totti 70'; Strootman 85' (pen.)	Stadium: Stadio Ennio Tardini; Attendance: 13,118; Referee: Marco Guida

22 September 2013 4	Roma	2–0	Lazio	Rome
15:00 CEST (UTC+02:00)	De Rossi (yellow card) 35'; Florenzi (yellow card) 41'; Maicon (yellow card) 50'; Balzaretti 63'; Strootman (yellow card) 76'; Ljajić 90+4' (pen.)	Report	Lulić (yellow card) 46'; Cavanda (yellow card) 52'; Cana (yellow card) 72'; Dias (red card) 82'	Stadium: Stadio Olimpico; Attendance: 45,306; Referee: Gianluca Rocchi

25 September 2013 5	Sampdoria	0–2	Roma	Genoa
20:45 CEST (UTC+02:00)	Krstičić (yellow card) 51'; Costa (yellow card) 64'; Barillà (yellow card) 83' (yellow-red card) 90+1'	Report	Strootman (yellow card) 30'; Castán (yellow card) 60'; Benatia 65'; Borriello (yellow card) 74'; Gervinho 88'	Stadium: Stadio Luigi Ferraris; Attendance: 21,494; Referee: Gianpaolo Calvarese

29 September 2013 6	Roma	5–0	Bologna	Rome
20:45 CEST (UTC+02:00)	Florenzi 8'; Gervinho 17', 62'; Benatia 25'; Ljajić 85'; De Rossi (yellow card) 90+1'	Report	Pérez (yellow card) 29'; Morleo (yellow card) 40'; Diamanti (yellow card) 49'	Stadium: Stadio Olimpico; Attendance: 38,467; Referee: Carmine Russo

5 October 2013 7	Internazionale	0–3	Roma	Milan
20:45 CEST (UTC+02:00)	Juan Jesus (yellow card) 32'; Pereira (yellow card) 39'	Report	Pjanić (yellow card) 15'; Totti 18', 40' (pen.); Benatia (yellow card) 28'; Castán (yellow card) 30'; Florenzi 44'; Balzaretti (yellow card) 50' (yellow-red card) 79'; De Sanctis (yellow card) 67'; Taddei (yellow card) 89'	Stadium: San Siro; Attendance: 60,336; Referee: Paolo Tagliavento

18 October 2013 8	Roma	2–0	Napoli	Rome
20:45 CEST (UTC+02:00)	Pjanić 45+4', 71' (pen.), (yellow card) 74'; Benatia (yellow card) 90+2'	Report	Callejón (yellow card) 20'; Pandev (yellow card) 25'; Cannavaro (yellow card) 45+2' (yellow-red card) 70'; Inler (yellow card) 73'	Stadium: Stadio Olimpico; Attendance: 45,913; Referee: Daniele Orsato

27 October 2013 9	Udinese	0–1	Roma	Udine
15:00 CEST (UTC+02:00)	Muriel (yellow card) 20'; Heurtaux (yellow card) 41'; Pereyra (yellow card) 86'; Pinzi (yellow card) 90+4'	Report	Maicon (yellow card) 11' (yellow-red card) 66'; De Rossi (yellow card) 24'; Florenzi (yellow card) 39'; Bradley 82'; Marquinho (yellow card) 90+4'	Stadium: Stadio Friuli; Attendance: 18,904; Referee: Mauro Bergonzi

31 October 2013 10	Roma	1–0	Chievo	Rome
20:45 CET (UTC+01:00)	Castán (yellow card) 26'; Pjanić (yellow card) 50'; Borriello 67'; Ljajić (yellow card) 77'	Report	Sardo (yellow card) 18'; Dainelli (yellow card) 39'; Hetemaj (yellow card) 77'; Pellissier (yellow card) 78'; Rigoni (yellow card) 79'; Squizzi (yellow card) 90+5'	Stadium: Stadio Olimpico; Attendance: 44,156; Referee: Sebastiano Peruzzo

3 November 2013 11	Torino	1–1	Roma	Turin
20:45 CET (UTC+01:00)	Cerci 63'; D'Ambrosio (yellow card) 79'; Basha (yellow card) 87'	Report	Benatia (yellow card) 26'; Strootman 28'; Bradley (yellow card) 53'; Maicon (yellow card) 90+3'	Stadium: Stadio Olimpico di Torino; Attendance: 16,276; Referee: Luca Banti

10 November 2013 12	Roma	1–1	Sassuolo	Rome
15:00 CET (UTC+01:00)	Longhi 19' (o.g.); Strootman (yellow card) 38'; Ljajić (yellow card) 77'	Report	Magnanelli (yellow card) 30'; Floro Flores (yellow card) 66'; Berardi (yellow card) 67', (goal) 90+4'; Kurtić (yellow card) 79'	Stadium: Stadio Olimpico; Attendance: 46,052; Referee: Piero Giacomelli

25 November 2013 13	Roma	0–0	Cagliari	Rome
20:45 CET (UTC+01:00)	Maicon (yellow card) 74'; Borriello (yellow card) 83'	Report	Pinilla (yellow card) 70'; Conti (yellow card) 73'; Eriksson (yellow card) 80'; Astori (yellow card) 83'	Stadium: Stadio Olimpico; Attendance: 38,823; Referee: Domenico Celi

1 December 2013 14	Atalanta	1–1	Roma	Bergamo
15:00 CET (UTC+01:00)	Cigarini (yellow card) 45+1'; Brivio 51'; Canini (yellow card) 58'; Denis (yellow card) 87'	Report	Benatia (yellow card) 78'; Strootman 90'; Ljajić (yellow card) 90+1'	Stadium: Stadio Atleti Azzurri d'Italia; Attendance: 15,362; Referee: Antonio Damato

8 December 2013 15	Roma	2–1	Fiorentina	Rome
12:30 CET (UTC+01:00)	Maicon 7'; Pjanić (yellow card) 23' (yellow-red card) 88'; De Sanctis (yellow card) 60'; Destro 67', (yellow card) 68'; Castán (yellow card) 69'	Report	Ambrosini (yellow card) 15'; Gonzalo (yellow card) 16'; Vargas 29'; Neto (yellow card) 63'; Cuadrado (yellow card) 90+3'	Stadium: Stadio Olimpico; Attendance: 48,318; Referee: Daniele Orsato

16 December 2013 16	Milan	2–2	Roma	Milan
20:45 CET (UTC+01:00)	Zapata 29'; Gabriel (yellow card) 50'; Kaká (yellow card) 73'; Montolivo (yellow card) 73'; Muntari 77'; Balotelli (yellow card) 84'	Report	De Rossi (yellow card) 11'; Destro 13'; Strootman 51' (pen.), (yellow card) 83'	Stadium: San Siro; Attendance: 37,987; Referee: Gianluca Rocchi

22 December 2013 17	Roma	4–0	Catania	Rome
15:00 CET (UTC+01:00)	Benatia 18', 59'; Bradley (yellow card) 43'; Destro 55'; Gervinho 80'	Report	Peruzzi (yellow card) 33'; Castro (yellow card) 51'; Barrientos (yellow card) 74'; Biraghi (yellow card) 78'	Stadium: Stadio Olimpico; Attendance: 40,599; Referee: Andrea Gervasoni

5 January 2014 18	Juventus	3–0	Roma	Turin
20:45 CET (UTC+01:00)	Vidal 17'; Tevez (yellow card) 33'; Chiellini (yellow card) 34'; Bonucci 48'; Vučinić 77' (pen.); Barzagli (yellow card) 87'	Report	Gervinho (yellow card) 37'; De Rossi (red card) 75'; Castán (red card) 76'; Ljajić (yellow card) 83'	Stadium: Juventus Stadium; Attendance: 39,266; Referee: Nicola Rizzoli

12 January 2014 19	Roma	4–0	Genoa	Rome
15:00 CET (UTC+01:00)	Florenzi 25'; Totti 30'; Maicon 43'; Benatia 52'	Report	Matuzalém (yellow card) 24' (yellow-red card) 60'; Antonelli (yellow card) 58'; Cofie (yellow card) 86'	Stadium: Stadio Olimpico; Attendance: 37,867; Referee: Gianpaolo Calvarese

18 January 2014 20	Roma	3–0	Livorno	Rome
18:00 CET (UTC+01:00)	Destro 6'; Strootman 36'; Ljajić 78'; Castán (yellow card) 82'	Report		Stadium: Stadio Olimpico; Attendance: 35,010; Referee: Carmine Russo

26 January 2014 21	Hellas Verona	1–3	Roma	Verona
12:30 CET (UTC+01:00)	Rômulo (yellow card) 10'; Hallfreðsson 49', (yellow card) 79'; Rafael Marques (yellow card) 83'	Report	Nainggolan (yellow card) 44'; Ljajić 45+1'; Gervinho 60'; Destro (yellow card) 67'; Totti 82' (pen.)	Stadium: Stadio Marc'Antonio Bentegodi; Attendance: 23,356; Referee: Paolo Mazzoleni

9 February 2014 23	Lazio	0–0	Roma	Rome
15:00 CET (UTC+01:00)	Lulić (yellow card) 38'; Candreva (yellow card) 64'; Mauri (yellow card) 67'	Report	Benatia (yellow card) 19'; Strootman (yellow card) 90+3'	Stadium: Stadio Olimpico; Attendance: 49,236; Referee: Daniele Orsato

16 February 2014 24	Roma	3–0	Sampdoria	Rome
15:00 CET (UTC+01:00)	Destro 44', 57', (yellow card) 45'; Strootman (yellow card) 45+1'; Pjanić 53'	Report	Gastaldello (yellow card) 49' (yellow-red card) 80'; De Silvestri (yellow card) 52'	Stadium: Stadio Olimpico; Attendance: 29,530; Referee: Domenico Celi

23 February 2014 25	Bologna	0–1	Roma	Bologna
15:00 CET (UTC+01:00)	Ibson (yellow card) 64'	Report	Benatia (yellow card) 34'; Nainggolan 37', (yellow card) 81'; Romagnoli (yellow card) 45+1'	Stadium: Stadio Renato Dall'Ara; Attendance: 22,755; Referee: Davide Massa

1 March 2014 26	Roma	0–0	Internazionale	Rome
20:45 CET (UTC+01:00)		Report	Samuel (yellow card) 48'	Stadium: Stadio Olimpico; Attendance: 37,464; Referee: Mauro Bergonzi

9 March 2014 27	Napoli	1–0	Roma	Naples
20:45 CET (UTC+01:00)	Callejón (yellow card) 34', (goal) 81'	Report	Maicon (yellow card) 33'; Taddei (yellow card) 84'	Stadium: Stadio San Paolo; Attendance: 38,879; Referee: Gianluca Rocchi

17 March 2014 28	Roma	3–2	Udinese	Rome
21:00 CET (UTC+01:00)	Totti 22'; Nainggolan (yellow card) 27'; Destro 30'; Torosidis 69'	Report	Pinzi 51'; Widmer (yellow card) 68'; Basta 80'	Stadium: Stadio Olimpico; Attendance: 34,274; Referee: Paolo Tagliavento

22 March 2014 29	Chievo	0–2	Roma	Verona
20:45 CET (UTC+01:00)	Bentivoglio (yellow card) 39'	Report	Gervinho 17'; Destro 42'; Benatia (yellow card) 86'	Stadium: Stadio Marc'Antonio Bentegodi; Attendance: 10,000; Referee: Paolo Mazzoleni

25 March 2014 30	Roma	2–1	Torino	Rome
20:45 CET (UTC+01:00)	Nainggolan (yellow card) 30'; Destro 41'; Bastos (yellow card) 87'; Florenzi 90+1'	Report	Moretti (yellow card) 29'; Immobile 52', (yellow card) 78'; Maksimović (yellow card) 65'; Vives (yellow card) 73'	Stadium: Stadio Olimpico; Attendance: 31,979; Referee: Mauro Bergonzi

30 March 2014 31	Sassuolo	0–2	Roma	Reggio Emilia
12:30 CEST (UTC+02:00)	Mendes (yellow card) 69'	Report	Destro 16'; Romagnoli (yellow card) 70'; Bastos 90+6'	Stadium: Mapei Stadium – Città del Tricolore; Attendance: 17,841; Referee: Nicola Rizzoli

2 April 2014 22	Roma	4–2	Parma	Rome
18:30 CEST (UTC+02:00)	Gervinho 12'; Totti 16'; Pjanić 49'; Taddei 82', (yellow card) 83'	Report	Acquah 15'; Mauri (yellow card) 87'; Biabiany 90'	Stadium: Stadio Olimpico; Attendance: 41,265; Referee: Andrea De Marco
Note: Postponed from 2 February because of excessive rain.

6 April 2014 32	Cagliari	1–3	Roma	Cagliari
15:00 CEST (UTC+02:00)	Astori (yellow card) 34'; Pinilla 89' (pen.)	Report	Pjanić (yellow card) 29'; Destro 32', 56', 73', (yellow card) 42'; Romagnoli (yellow card) 39'; Florenzi (yellow card) 48'	Stadium: Stadio Sant'Elia; Attendance: 4,798; Referee: Davide Massa

13 April 2014 33	Roma	3–1	Atalanta	Rome
20:45 CEST (UTC+02:00)	Taddei 13'; Ljajić 44'; Gervinho 63'	Report	Stendardo (yellow card) 6'; Cigarini (yellow card) 32'; Estigarribia (yellow card) 67'; Migliaccio 78'	Stadium: Stadio Olimpico; Attendance: 41,366; Referee: Marco Guida

19 April 2014 34	Fiorentina	0–1	Roma	Florence
21:00 CEST (UTC+02:00)	Pasqual (yellow card) 43'; Tomović (yellow card) 90+1'; Matri (yellow card) 90+4'	Report	Nainggolan 26'; Ljajić (yellow card) 40'; Castán (yellow card) 53'; Dodô (yellow card) 56'; Toloi (yellow card) 70'	Stadium: Stadio Artemio Franchi; Attendance: 34,604; Referee: Paolo Mazzoleni

27 April 2014 35	Roma	2–0	Milan	Rome
20:45 CEST (UTC+02:00)	Pjanić 43', (yellow card) 45'; Gervinho 65'; Totti (yellow card) 68'; Nainggolan (yellow card) 70'	Report	Muntari (yellow card) 33'; Honda (yellow card) 39'; Rami (yellow card) 80'	Stadium: Stadio Olimpico; Attendance: 49,792; Referee: Paolo Tagliavento

4 May 2014 36	Catania	4–1	Roma	Catania
15:00 CEST (UTC+02:00)	Izco 26', 34'; Bergessio 55'; Rinaudo (yellow card) 62'; Barrientos 79'	Report	Dodô (yellow card) 12'; Romagnoli (yellow card) 30'; Totti 37', (yellow card) 87'; Gervinho (yellow card) 61'; Pjanić (yellow card) 85'	Stadium: Stadio Angelo Massimino; Attendance: 19,028; Referee: Luca Banti

11 May 2014 37	Roma	0–1	Juventus	Rome
17:45 CEST (UTC+02:00)	Destro (yellow card) 48'; Pjanić (yellow card) 59'; Totti (yellow card) 87'; Torosidis (yellow card) 90+1'	Report	Chiellini (yellow card) 24'; Osvaldo 90+4'	Stadium: Stadio Olimpico; Attendance: 54,097; Referee: Carmine Russo

18 May 2014 38	Genoa	1–0	Roma	Genoa
15:00 CEST (UTC+02:00)	Fetfatzidis 83'	Report	Jedvaj (yellow card) 56'	Stadium: Stadio Luigi Ferraris; Attendance: 19,223; Referee: Massimiliano Irrati

=== Coppa Italia ===
9 January 2014 Round of 16	Roma	1–0	Sampdoria	Rome
18:00 CET (UTC+01:00)	Torosidis 6'; Nainggolan (yellow card) 67'		Obiang (yellow card) 62'; Rodríguez (yellow card) 87'	Stadium: Stadio Olimpico; Attendance: 20,493; Referee: Dino Tommasi

21 January 2014 Quarter-finals	Roma	1–0	Juventus	Rome
20:45 CET (UTC+01:00)	Benatia (yellow card) 14'; Florenzi (yellow card) 29'; Castán (yellow card) 65'; Gervinho 79'		Peluso (yellow card) 75'; Vidal (yellow card) 90+4'	Stadium: Stadio Olimpico; Attendance: 60,000; Referee: Paolo Tagliavento

5 February 2014 Semi-finals; First leg	Roma	3–2	Napoli	Rome
20:45 CET (UTC+01:00)	Gervinho 13', 88'; Strootman 32'; Nainggolan (yellow card) 39'		De Sanctis 47' (o.g.); Mertens 70'; Inler (yellow card) 85'	Stadium: Stadio Olimpico; Attendance: 30,000; Referee: Mauro Bergonzi

12 February 2014 Semi-finals; Second leg	Napoli	3–0 (5–3 agg.)	Roma	Naples
20:45 CET (UTC+01:00)	Callejón 33', (yellow card) 74'; Higuaín 48'; Jorginho 51'; Maggio (yellow card) 57'		Benatia (yellow card) 15'; Ljajić (yellow card) 21'; Strootman (yellow card) 79' (red card) 79'; Castán (yellow card) 83'	Stadium: Stadio San Paolo; Attendance: 42,231; Referee: Gianluca Rocchi

== Statistics ==
=== Appearances and goals ===
No.	Pos	Nat	Player	Total		Serie A		Coppa Italia	
No.	Pos	Nat	Player	Apps	Goals	Apps	Goals	Apps	Goals
Goalkeepers
1	GK	(Romania) ROU	Bogdan Lobonț	0	0	0	0	0	0
26	GK	(Italy) ITA	Morgan De Sanctis	39	0	36	0	3	0
28	GK	(Poland) POL	Łukasz Skorupski	3	0	2	0	1	0
Defenders
2	DF	(Brazil) BRA	Rafael Toloi	5	0	4+1	0	0	0
3	DF	(Brazil) BRA	Dodô	20	0	15+4	0	1	0
5	DF	(Brazil) BRA	Leandro Castán	40	0	36	0	4	0
13	DF	(Brazil) BRA	Maicon	30	2	27	2	2+1	0
17	DF	(Morocco) MAR	Medhi Benatia	37	5	32+1	5	3+1	0
33	DF	(Croatia) CRO	Tin Jedvaj	2	0	1+1	0	0	0
35	DF	(Greece) GRE	Vasilis Torosidis	22	2	12+6	1	4	1
42	DF	(Italy) ITA	Federico Balzaretti	11	1	10+1	1	0	0
46	DF	(Italy) ITA	Alessio Romagnoli	11	0	8+3	0	0	0
Midfielders
6	MF	(Netherlands) NED	Kevin Strootman	28	6	23+1	5	3+1	1
11	MF	(Brazil) BRA	Rodrigo Taddei	20	2	7+12	2	1	0
15	MF	(Bosnia and Herzegovina) BIH	Miralem Pjanić	38	6	32+3	6	1+2	0
16	MF	(Italy) ITA	Daniele De Rossi	36	1	31+1	1	4	0
24	MF	(Italy) ITA	Alessandro Florenzi	41	6	23+14	6	2+2	0
44	MF	(Belgium) BEL	Radja Nainggolan	20	2	16+1	2	3	0
95	MF	(Italy) ITA	Luca Mazzitelli	1	0	0+1	0	0	0
Forwards
8	FW	(Serbia) SRB	Adem Ljajić	32	6	17+11	6	3+1	0
10	FW	(Italy) ITA	Francesco Totti	29	8	20+6	8	2+1	0
20	FW	(Brazil) BRA	Michel Bastos	17	1	3+13	1	1	0
22	FW	(Italy) ITA	Mattia Destro	23	13	15+5	13	2+1	0
27	FW	(Ivory Coast) CIV	Gervinho	37	12	30+3	9	3+1	3
88	FW	(Italy) ITA	Marco Borriello	11	1	6+5	1	0	0
94	FW	(Italy) ITA	Federico Ricci	4	0	1+3	0	0	0
Players transferred out during the season
4	MF	(United States) USA	Michael Bradley	11	1	11	1	0	0
7	MF	(Brazil) BRA	Marquinho	10	0	3+7	0	0	0
29	DF	(Argentina) ARG	Nicolás Burdisso	6	0	3+2	0	1	0

Last updated: 18 May 2014
Source: Competitions

=== Goalscorers ===
Rank	No.	Pos	Nat	Name	Serie A	Coppa Italia	Total
1	22	FW	(Italy)	Mattia Destro	13	0	13
2	27	FW	(Ivory Coast)	Gervinho	9	3	12
3	10	FW	(Italy)	Francesco Totti	8	0	8
4	6	MF	(Netherlands)	Kevin Strootman	5	1	6
4	8	FW	(Serbia)	Adem Ljajić	6	0	6
4	15	MF	(Bosnia and Herzegovina)	Miralem Pjanić	6	0	6
4	24	MF	(Italy)	Alessandro Florenzi	6	0	6
8	17	DF	(Morocco)	Medhi Benatia	5	0	5
9	11	MF	(Brazil)	Rodrigo Taddei	2	0	2
9	13	DF	(Brazil)	Maicon	2	0	2
9	35	DF	(Greece)	Vasilis Torosidis	1	1	2
9	44	MF	(Belgium)	Radja Nainggolan	2	0	2
13	4	MF	(United States)	Michael Bradley	1	0	1
13	16	MF	(Italy)	Daniele De Rossi	1	0	1
13	20	FW	(Brazil)	Michel Bastos	1	0	1
13	42	DF	(Italy)	Federico Balzaretti	1	0	1
13	88	FW	(Italy)	Marco Borriello	1	0	1
Own goal					0	0	0
Totals					70	5	75

Last updated: 18 May 2014

=== Clean sheets ===
Rank	No.	Pos	Nat	Name	Serie A	Coppa Italia	Total
1	26	GK	(Italy)	Morgan De Sanctis	21	1	22
2	28	GK	(Poland)	Łukasz Skorupski	0	1	1
Totals					21	2	23

Last updated: 18 May 2014

=== Disciplinary record ===
No.	Pos	Nat	Name	Serie A			Coppa Italia			Total		
No.	Pos	Nat	Name	Booked	(yellow card) (yellow-red card)	Sent off (straight red)	Booked	(yellow card) (yellow-red card)	Sent off (straight red)	Booked	(yellow card) (yellow-red card)	Sent off (straight red)
1	GK	(Romania)	Bogdan Lobonț	0	0	0	0	0	0	0	0	0
26	GK	(Italy)	Morgan De Sanctis	2	0	0	0	0	0	2	0	0
28	GK	(Poland)	Łukasz Skorupski	0	0	0	0	0	0	0	0	0
2	DF	(Brazil)	Rafael Toloi	1	0	0	0	0	0	1	0	0
3	DF	(Brazil)	Dodô	2	0	0	0	0	0	2	0	0
5	DF	(Brazil)	Leandro Castán	7	0	1	0	0	0	7	0	1
13	DF	(Brazil)	Maicon	4	1	0	0	0	0	4	1	0
17	DF	(Morocco)	Medhi Benatia	8	0	0	0	0	0	8	0	0
29	DF	(Argentina)	Nicolás Burdisso	0	0	0	0	0	0	0	0	0
33	DF	(Croatia)	Tin Jedvaj	1	0	0	0	0	0	1	0	0
35	DF	(Greece)	Vasilis Torosidis	1	0	0	0	0	0	1	0	0
42	DF	(Italy)	Federico Balzaretti	1	1	0	0	0	0	1	1	0
46	DF	(Italy)	Alessio Romagnoli	4	0	0	0	0	0	4	0	0
4	MF	(United States)	Michael Bradley	2	0	0	0	0	0	2	0	0
6	MF	(Netherlands)	Kevin Strootman	6	0	0	0	0	0	6	0	0
7	MF	(Brazil)	Marquinho	1	0	0	0	0	0	1	0	0
11	MF	(Brazil)	Rodrigo Taddei	3	0	0	0	0	0	3	0	0
15	MF	(Bosnia and Herzegovina)	Miralem Pjanić	7	1	0	0	0	0	7	1	0
16	MF	(Italy)	Daniele De Rossi	4	0	1	0	0	0	4	0	1
24	MF	(Italy)	Alessandro Florenzi	4	0	0	0	0	0	4	0	0
44	MF	(Belgium)	Radja Nainggolan	5	0	0	0	0	0	5	0	0
95	MF	(Italy)	Luca Mazzitelli	0	0	0	0	0	0	0	0	0
8	FW	(Serbia)	Adem Ljajić	5	0	0	0	0	0	5	0	0
10	FW	(Italy)	Francesco Totti	3	0	0	0	0	0	3	0	0
20	FW	(Brazil)	Michel Bastos	1	0	0	0	0	0	1	0	0
22	FW	(Italy)	Mattia Destro	5	0	0	0	0	0	5	0	0
27	FW	(Ivory Coast)	Gervinho	2	0	0	0	0	0	2	0	0
88	FW	(Italy)	Marco Borriello	2	0	0	0	0	0	2	0	0
94	FW	(Italy)	Federico Ricci	0	0	0	0	0	0	0	0	0
Totals				81	3	2	9	0	1	90	3	3

Last updated: 18 May 2014
