= Kevin Strootman =

Dutch footballer (born 1990)

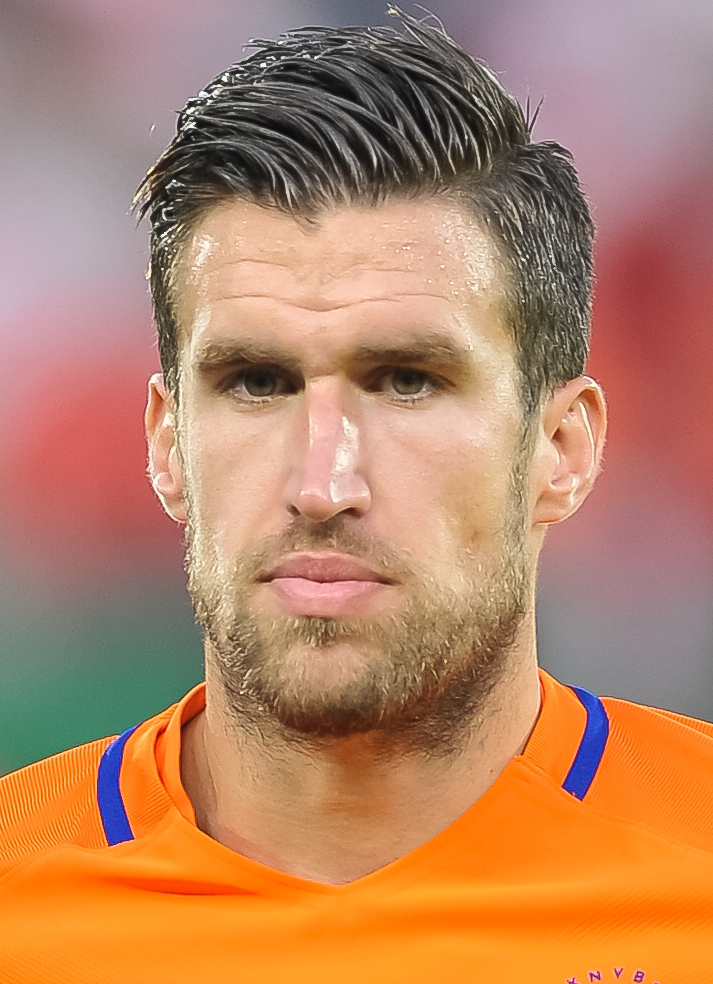
- Strootman playing for the Netherlands in 2016

Personal information
- Full name: Kevin Johannes Willem Strootman
- Date of birth: 13 February 1990 (age 36)
- Place of birth: Ridderkerk, Netherlands
- Height: 1.86 m (6 ft 1 in)
- Position: Defensive midfielder

Youth career
- 2007–2009: Sparta Rotterdam

Senior career*
Years	Team	Apps	(Gls)
2008–2011	Sparta Rotterdam	72	(8)
2011	Utrecht	14	(2)
2011–2013	PSV Eindhoven	62	(8)
2013–2018	Roma	102	(10)
2018–2023	Marseille	64	(3)
2021	→ Genoa (loan)	18	(0)
2021–2022	→ Cagliari (loan)	10	(0)
2022–2023	→ Genoa (loan)	30	(2)
2023–2024	Genoa	27	(0)
Total		399	(33)

International career
2008–2009	Netherlands U19	4	(1)
2009–2013	Netherlands U21	12	(1)
2011–2019	Netherlands	46	(3)
Medal record
Men's football
Representing Netherlands
UEFA Nations League
Silver medal – second place	2019 Portugal
- * Club domestic league appearances and goals

Kevin Johannes Willem Strootman (born 13 February 1990) is a Dutch former professional footballer who played as a defensive midfielder.

== Club career ==
=== Sparta Rotterdam ===
Born in Ridderkerk, Strootman began his career with Sparta Rotterdam, making his professional debut during the 2007–08 season. He signed a contract extension with the club in November 2008. After they were relegated at the end of the 2009–10 Eredivisie season, he played with Sparta in the Eerste Divisie.

=== Utrecht ===
In the January transfer window of 2011, Strootman was signed by Utrecht. He played with Utrecht in the second half of the 2010–11 season, before moving to PSV Eindhoven in June 2011.

=== PSV Eindhoven ===
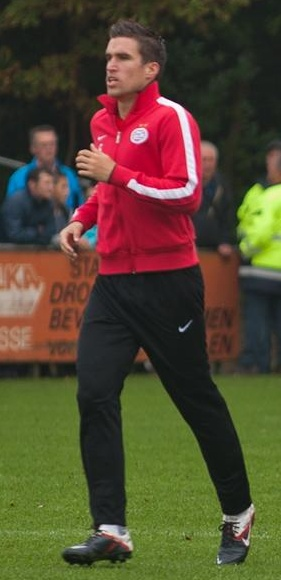
Strootman with PSV Eindhoven in 2011

Strootman was joined at PSV Eindhoven with fellow Utrecht recruit Dries Mertens. Strootman made his PSV debut in a 3–1 home win against AZ. He made 88 total appearances for the Eindhoven club.

=== Roma ===
On 16 July 2013, PSV and Roma finalized a deal for Strootman's transfer to the Italian side, in a deal worth €17 million, with the fee potentially rising to €19 million through add-ons. He was given the number 6 shirt.

In a pre-season friendly against the Major League Soccer (MLS) All-Stars, Strootman scored one goal and assisted another as Roma prevailed 3–1 at Sporting Park, Kansas City, Kansas. He scored his first competitive goal for Roma in 3–1 Serie A victory over Parma. He went on to score in matches against Torino, Atalanta, Milan and Livorno.

On 9 March 2014, Strootman sustained a knee injury in Roma's 1–0 defeat to Napoli which made him miss the remainder of the 2013–14 season and the 2014 FIFA World Cup, where the Dutch selection finished third.

On 9 November, Strootman made his first appearance for Roma in exactly eight months, appearing as an 84th-minute substitute in a 3–0 defeat of Torino at the Stadio Olimpico. His first start of the 2014–15 season came in a 2–2 draw with Sassuolo on 7 December. He assisted the first of captain Francesco Totti's two goals after appearing as a substitute in Roma's 2–2 draw with Lazio in the 175th Derby della Capitale on 12 January 2015.

On 26 January 2015, Strootman was substituted in a Serie A fixture against Fiorentina after sustaining further damage to his anterior cruciate ligament. Three days later, it was confirmed that the player would again undergo knee surgery. On 26 August, it was reported that, in spite of failing to make a single appearance in seven months, Strootman's injury required further surgery which sidelined the player for the majority of the 2015–16 Serie A season. He made his first appearance of the season on 21 February 2016, as a substitute in a 5–0 home defeat of Palermo. On 2 May, he made his first start in over 15 months, playing the full 90 minutes in Roma's 3–2 win at Genoa. He ended the season with five appearances, including two starts. His only assist of the season came in a 3–1 final day victory over Milan at the San Siro.

On 20 August 2016, Strootman captained Roma in the opening match of the 2016–17 Serie A season, a 4–0 home win against Udinese. In the team's second fixture, he scored his first goal since January 2014 as Roma drew 2–2 at Cagliari.

On 29 May 2017, Strootman signed a new five-year contract with the 2017 Serie A runners-up.

=== Marseille ===
On 28 August 2018, Marseille agreed with Roma on a €25 million (plus €3 million of bonus) transfer fee and signed Strootman on a five-year contract. Roma published a thank you and confirmation of the transfer on their website. Strootman mentioned the club's history, ambitions as well as his close relationship with coach Rudi Garcia as motivating factors to join the club.

On 10 January 2020, Strootman scored an 84th-minute winner for Marseille after coming on as a substitute against Rennes.

==== Loan to Genoa ====
On 12 January 2021 Strootman was loaned to Serie A club Genoa until the end of the season.

==== Loan to Cagliari ====
On 3 July 2021, Strootman was announced by Serie A club Cagliari, on loan until the end of the 2021–22 season, with an option to renew for the 2022–23 season included.

=== Return to Genoa ===
On 24 August 2022, Strootman returned to Genoa on a new loan.

On 6 July 2023, following their promotion to Serie A, Strootman signed for Genoa permanently on a free transfer.

=== Retirement ===
On 18 October 2024, Strootman announced his retirement from football.

== International career ==
Strootman made his senior international debut for the Netherlands against Austria in 2011 and scored his first international goal against Finland in a UEFA Euro 2012 qualifier. He was a member of the Netherlands' squad at Euro 2012 but did not appear in any matches as the Dutch were knocked out at the group stage.

He appeared for the Netherlands U21 team at the 2013 UEFA Euro U21 Championship where the team reached the semi-finals, losing to Italy.

Strootman was a regular in Louis van Gaal's side during the 2014 FIFA World Cup qualifying campaign, but missed the tournament finals due to injury.

On 27 May 2016, Strootman made his first international appearance in two years after missing both the 2014 FIFA World Cup and the entirety of the team's unsuccessful UEFA Euro 2016 qualifying campaign. He was selected to start in a friendly match against the Republic of Ireland, playing 70 minutes before being substituted for Marco van Ginkel.

== Style of play ==
Strootman was said to be a dynamic and tough-tackling midfielder, who also possessed good vision, technique, and balance on the ball. A tall, physically strong and tactically intelligent left-footed player, he was described as a "modern" midfielder, due to his wide range of skills. He was best used as a central or defensive midfielder, often serving as either a box-to-box midfielder or mezzala – due to his work-rate, ball-winning abilities, and ability to help out in both attack and defence – or as a deep-lying playmaker, due to his range of passing, awareness, and ability to create goalscoring opportunities for his teammates after winning back possession. He was also capable of contributing to his team's offensive play with goals, courtesy of his powerful and accurate striking ability from outside the area, as well as his ability to get on the end of his teammates' passes by making late attacking runs into the box from behind. Strootman had been compared to compatriot Mark van Bommel. During his first season with Roma (2013–14), he earned the nickname la lavatrice ("the washing machine", in Italian), for his ability to always clean up play by winning back the ball and then distributing it precisely to his teammates.

== Career statistics ==
=== Club ===
Appearances and goals by club, season and competition
Club	Season	League			National cup (Note: Includes KNVB Cup, Coppa Italia, Coupe de France)		League cup (Note: Includes Coupe de la Ligue)		Europe		Other		Total	
Club	Season	Division	Apps	Goals	Apps	Goals	Apps	Goals	Apps	Goals	Apps	Goals	Apps	Goals
Sparta Rotterdam	2007–08	Eredivisie	3	0	0	0	—		—		—		3	0
Sparta Rotterdam	2008–09	Eredivisie	25	2	3	1	—		—		—		28	3
Sparta Rotterdam	2009–10	Eredivisie	28	2	4	2	—		—		4 (Note: Appearances in Eredivisie relegation play-offs)	0	36	4
Sparta Rotterdam	2010–11	Eerste Divisie	16	4	1	0	—		—		—		17	4
Sparta Rotterdam	Total		72	8	8	3	—		—		4	0	84	11
Utrecht	2010–11	Eredivisie	14	2	2	0	—		—		—		16	2
PSV Eindhoven	2011–12	Eredivisie	30	2	5	1	—		11 (Note: Appearances in UEFA Europa League)	3	—		46	6
PSV Eindhoven	2012–13	Eredivisie	32	6	5	1	—		4	1	1 (Note: Appearance in Johan Cruyff Shield)	0	42	8
PSV Eindhoven	Total		62	8	10	2	—		15	4	1	0	88	14
Roma	2013–14	Serie A	25	5	4	1	—		—		—		29	6
Roma	2014–15	Serie A	6	0	0	0	—		1 (Note: Appearances in UEFA Champions League)	0	0	0	7	0
Roma	2015–16	Serie A	5	0	0	0	—		0	0	0	0	5	0
Roma	2016–17	Serie A	33	4	3	0	—		9 (Note: Two appearances in UEFA Champions League, seven appearances and two goals in UEFA Europa League)	2	0	0	45	6
Roma	2017–18	Serie A	32	1	1	0	—		11	0	0	0	44	1
Roma	2018–19	Serie A	1	0	0	0	—		0	0	0	0	1	0
Roma	Total		102	10	8	1	—		21	2	0	0	131	13
Marseille	2018–19	Ligue 1	28	1	1	0	0	0	5	0	—		34	1
Marseille	2019–20	Ligue 1	25	2	4	0	1	0	—		—		30	2
Marseille	2020–21	Ligue 1	11	0	0	0	—		3	0	—		14	0
Marseille	Total		64	3	5	0	1	0	8	0	—		78	3
Genoa (loan)	2020–21	Serie A	18	0	0	0	—		—		—		18	0
Cagliari (loan)	2021–22	Serie A	10	0	1	0	—		—		—		11	0
Genoa (loan)	2022–23	Serie B	30	2	1	0	—		—		—		31	2
Genoa	2023–24	Serie A	27	0	2	0	—		—		—		29	0
Career total			399	33	37	6	1	0	44	6	5	0	486	45

=== International ===
Appearances and goals by national team and year
National team	Year	Apps	Goals
Netherlands	2011	10	1
Netherlands	2012	5	0
Netherlands	2013	9	2
Netherlands	2014	1	0
Netherlands	2015	0	0
Netherlands	2016	7	0
Netherlands	2017	7	0
Netherlands	2018	4	0
Netherlands	2019	3	0
Total		46	3

Netherlands score listed first, score column indicates score after each Strootman goal.

International goals by date, venue, cap, opponent, score, result and competition
No.	Date	Venue	Cap	Opponent	Score	Result	Competition
1	6 September 2011	Olympic Stadium, Helsinki, Finland	6	Finland	1–0	2–0	UEFA Euro 2012 qualifying
2	14 August 2013	Estádio Algarve, Faro/Loulé, Portugal	19	Portugal	1–0	1–1	Friendly
3	11 October 2013	Amsterdam Arena, Amsterdam, Netherlands	22	Hungary	2–0	8–1	2014 FIFA World Cup qualification

== Honours ==
PSV

- KNVB Cup: 2011–12
- Johan Cruyff Shield: 2012
