= Daniele De Rossi =

Italian footballer (born 1983)

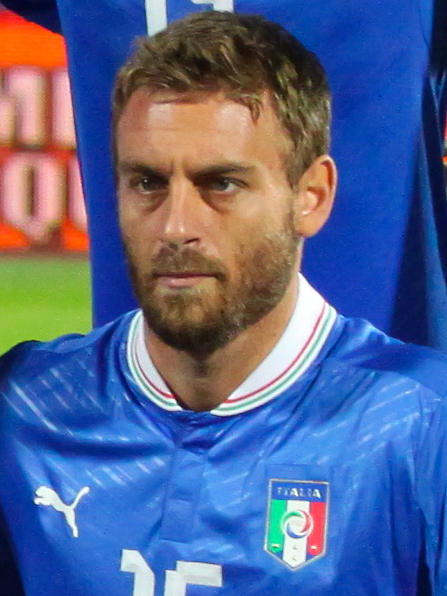
- De Rossi with Italy in 2012

Personal information
- Full name: Daniele De Rossi
- Date of birth: 24 July 1983 (age 43)
- Place of birth: Rome, Italy
- Height: 1.84 m (6 ft 0 in)
- Position: Midfielder

Team information
- Current team: Genoa (head coach)

Youth career
- 1997–2000: Ostiamare
- 2000–2001: Roma

Senior career*
Years	Team	Apps	(Gls)
2001–2019	Roma	459	(43)
2019–2020	Boca Juniors	5	(0)
Total		464	(43)

International career
2001	Italy U19	3	(2)
2002	Italy U20	4	(0)
2003–2004	Italy U21	16	(3)
2004–2017	Italy	117	(21)

Managerial career
- 2022–2023: SPAL
- 2024: Roma
- 2025–: Genoa
Medal record
Men's football
Representing Italy
FIFA World Cup
Winner	2006 Germany
UEFA European Championship
Runner-up	2012 Poland-Ukraine
FIFA Confederations Cup
Third place	2013 Brazil
Summer Olympics
Bronze medal – third place	2004 Athens
UEFA European Under-21 Championship
Winner	2004 Germany
- * Club domestic league appearances and goals

Daniele De Rossi Ufficiale OMRI (Italian pronunciation: [daˈnjɛːle de ˈrossi]; born 24 July 1983) is an Italian football manager and former professional player, currently in charge as the head coach of Serie A club Genoa. He usually played in central midfield, specifically as a central defensive midfielder. As a football player, he is known for his long career with hometown club Roma, as well as winning the 2006 FIFA World Cup with Italy.

De Rossi made his professional debut with Roma during the 2001–02 season, and made his Serie A debut the following year. With the club, he won the Coppa Italia twice in 2007 and 2008, and the 2007 Supercoppa Italiana. He was named Serie A Young Footballer of the Year in 2006, and the Serie A Italian Footballer of the Year in 2009. De Rossi inherited the captaincy of Roma at the start of the 2017–18 season following the retirement of Francesco Totti, during which he helped Roma to the Champions League semi-final for the first time in the Champions League era. At the end of the 2018–19 season, he left Roma after 18 seasons with the team. With 616 appearances for Roma in all competitions, he is the club's second-most capped player of all time, behind Totti. He subsequently joined Argentine club Boca Juniors in the summer of 2019, and retired from professional football in January of the following year.

De Rossi represented Italy at under-19, under-20, under-21 and senior levels, winning the 2004 European Under-21 Football Championship, and also represented Italy at the 2004 Olympics, winning a bronze medal. From his senior international debut in 2004 until his retirement from the national team in 2017, he earned 117 caps, and is Italy's joint fourth-highest capped player of all time, and most capped midfielder of all time. With 21 goals, he is the highest-scoring midfielder for Italy post-World War II, and Italy's all-time second most prolific midfielder behind Adolfo Baloncieri. He was part of the 2006 World Cup-winning squad and also participated at Euro 2008, the 2009 Confederations Cup, the 2010 World Cup, Euro 2012 (finishing in second place), the 2013 Confederations Cup (finishing in third place), the 2014 World Cup, and Euro 2016. De Rossi was named in the Euro 2012 Team of the Tournament for his performances.

== Early life ==
De Rossi was born in Rome to Alberto De Rossi, a former professional footballer who later became a long-time coach of Roma's Primavera youth side, and his mother, Roberta, who worked as an executive secretary. Due to his father's playing career in Serie C, his family frequently relocated across Italy during his early childhood—including spells living in Livorno and Rimini—before permanently settling in the coastal Roman district of Ostia.

De Rossi attended school at the Complesso Scolastico Internazionale Giovanni Paolo II in Lido di Ostia, where he studied at the liceo linguistico. A passionate Roma supporter from a young age, he began his youth career playing as a striker with local coastal club Ostiamare between 1997 and 2000, before being scouted and integrated into the Roma youth system at the age of 17.

== Club career ==
=== Roma ===
==== 2001–2006: Early career and emergence ====
De Rossi joined the Roma youth system from Ostiamare, where he had played as a striker, in 2000. He made his first-team debut for Roma under manager Fabio Capello on 30 October 2001 against Belgian side Anderlecht in the UEFA Champions League. In his first season with the club, he also made three appearances in the Coppa Italia. The following season, he made his Serie A debut on 25 January 2003 against Como in Piacenza. Later that season, his first Serie A start, along with his first league and career goal, came on 10 May 2003 against Torino.

He soon established himself as a permanent member of the starting line-up in the holding midfield position during the next few seasons, and was considered one of the most promising young Italian players in the league, helping Roma to a second-place finish in Serie A during the 2003–04 season, and consecutive Coppa Italia finals in 2005 and 2006. Due to his maturity, tenacity and leadership on the pitch, on 15 March 2006, De Rossi wore the captain's armband for the first time in an UEFA Cup match against Middlesbrough. Despite earning several cautions and a reputation as a hard-tackling player during the 2005–06 season, on 19 March 2006, De Rossi was praised by referee Mauro Bergonzi for fair play. Roma were trailing 1–0 in a Serie A match against Messina, when De Rossi scored a goal from a header, which had been deflected off of his hand; Bergonzi did not see the incident and allowed the equaliser to stand. However, De Rossi immediately told the referee that he had pushed the ball in with his hand, leading to the goal being disallowed. Roma went on to win 2–1, although De Rossi endured an injury to his ankle during the match, which ruled him out for two weeks. At the end of the season, he was named the 2006 Serie A Young Footballer of the Year for his performances.

==== 2006–2011: Domestic success and recognition ====
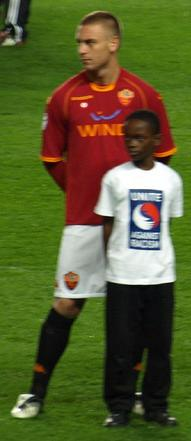
De Rossi with Roma in 2008

In the 2006–07 season, De Rossi continued to be a decisive player for the team, scoring from 40 yards against Fiorentina on 5 November 2006, with Sébastien Frey in goal. This was the first of three goals of the night for Roma, as they won the match 3–1. He also scored the lone Roma goal in Roma's Champions League quarter-final defeat against Manchester United in the 2006–07 season. On 9 May 2007, De Rossi scored in Roma's 6–2 first leg victory of the 2007 Coppa Italia final over Internazionale, as Roma went on to win the trophy on aggregate.

The following season, under manager Luciano Spalletti, Roma won the Supercoppa Italiana over Serie A champions Inter, with De Rossi scoring the decisive goal from a penalty in a 1–0 victory in Milan on 19 August 2007. De Rossi also played a key role as the club defended their Coppa Italia title that season, defeating Inter once again in the final 2–1, on 24 May 2008, although they finished second in Serie A behind Inter.

Roma were unable to defend the Supercoppa Italiana against Inter the following season, losing the final 8–7 on penalties after a 2–2 draw following extra time. During the match, De Rossi managed a goal in regulation time, and also converted one of Roma's penalties in the resulting shoot-out. He scored his first goal in the Rome Derby on 11 April 2009, in a 4–2 "away" defeat to cross-city rivals Lazio. Roma finished the 2008–09 Serie A season in sixth place, reaching the quarter-finals of the Coppa Italia. In 2009, De Rossi was named Italian Footballer of the Year.

During the 2009–10 season, De Rossi made his 200th Serie A appearance against Lazio in the Rome Derby of 6 December 2009. He was a key player in midfield under manager Claudio Ranieri, scoring a crucial goal in a 2–1 home win over rivals Inter on 27 March 2010, as Roma went on a 24-game unbeaten streak, narrowly missing out on the league title to Inter. De Rossi also scored the decisive goal in a 1–0 win over Catania on 26 January 2010, in the Coppa Italia quarter-finals, as Roma reached the 2010 Coppa Italia final, losing out to Inter once again.

The 2010–11 season proved less successful, as Roma were defeated by Inter in the 2010 Supercoppa Italiana and finished the Serie A season in sixth place, also suffering a semi-final elimination in the Coppa Italia. On 4 February 2011, however, De Rossi was elected the best Italian Athlete of the Year, alongside swimmer Federica Pellegrini, by the Foreign Press Association in Italy.

==== 2011–2017: Struggles and mixed success under DiBenedetto and Pallotta presidencies ====
In February 2012, De Rossi signed a new five-year contract with Roma. Under new club president Thomas R. DiBenedetto, he became the highest-paid Italian footballer in Serie A at €10 million (gross) per annum. Roma's previous record for an Italian player was Francesco Totti (€8.9 million in 2009–10 season). De Rossi finished the 2011–12 season with 32 appearances and four goals as Roma finished the season in seventh place under manager Luis Enrique.

In the 2012–13 season, De Rossi received less playing time and featured in just 25 matches. His manager Zdeněk Zeman was often critical of De Rossi's performances, and as a result he was used with less frequency. After Aurelio Andreazzoli's arrival, however, De Rossi started playing with more regularity, although he did not manage to score any goals.

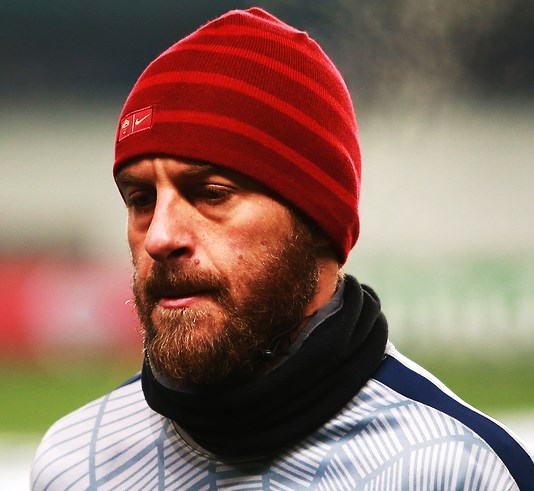
De Rossi at a match between Roma and CSKA Moscow, 2014

Roma started the 2013–14 season under manager Rudi Garcia winning each of their first 10 Serie A games. He scored the first goal of the season for Roma against Livorno. In the game against Napoli, De Rossi played a crucial role in the first half when the score was still 0–0; Roma went on to win through two Miralem Pjanić goals. He captained Roma after Francesco Totti was sidelined with a hamstring injury, playing three successive draws against Torino, Sassuolo and Cagliari, and slipped to second place, one point behind Juventus. On 10 November 2013, De Rossi made his 318th appearance in Serie A in a 1–1 draw with Sassuolo, equalling Roma legend Giuseppe Giannini's number of caps; the match was also his 400th starting appearance for Roma. Due to this series of draws, De Rossi admitted that he was not sure whether Roma could seriously challenge for the Scudetto in the long run, believing that both Juventus and Napoli had stronger squads with greater depth. He also stated in an interview that he was close to joining Manchester United in the summer, but the transfer did not happen because it was too late in the transfer window. He also mentioned that he was happy that he stayed at Roma for now, believing moving to United would not have been the best idea at the current time, due to Roma's solid start. De Rossi was one of two Roma players to be sent off within a minute in the first game after the winter break against league leaders Juventus, as Roma suffered their first defeat of the season in a 3–0 drubbing on 5 January 2014. The defeat left them in second place, eight points behind the Bianconeri. On 11 May 2014, with 338 league appearances, De Rossi reached and later overtook legendary Roma goalkeeper Guido Masetti, becoming the third-highest appearance holder in Serie A history for Roma.

During the 2014–15 season, De Rossi scored his first goal in almost a year on 29 October 2014 in a 2–0 Serie A win over Cesena. On 20 January, he scored the decisive penalty in extra time, which allowed Roma to overcome Empoli and advance to the quarter-finals of the 2014–15 Coppa Italia.

During the 2015–16 season, De Rossi scored in a 3–1 home win over Empoli, in his 500th appearance for Roma in all competitions, on 17 October 2015. On 20 October, he scored twice in a 4–4 away draw against Bayer Leverkusen in the 2015–16 Champions League.

On 28 May 2017, De Rossi scored in a 3–2 home win against Genoa, which enabled Roma to finish in second place in Serie A and secure a Champions League group stage spot for the following season. On 31 May, De Rossi signed a new 2-year contract with Roma.

==== 2017–2019: Final years as Roma captain, and first Champions League semi-final ====
Following Francesco Totti's retirement, De Rossi inherited the captain's armband ahead of the 2017–18 season. On 10 April 2018, he scored from the penalty spot during a 3–0 Champions League win over Barcelona to help Roma overturn a 4–1 deficit from the first leg. The result was the joint-second largest comeback in the tournament's history and saw Roma advance to the semi-finals for the first time in the Champions League era. On 26 September 2018, De Rossi made his 600th appearance for Roma in a 4–0 home win over Frosinone, becoming only the second player after Totti to reach this landmark. On 14 May 2019, Roma announced that they would not renew De Rossi's contract, and that he will leave the club at the end of the 2018–19 season, after 18 seasons with the team. He made his 616th and final appearance for the club on 26 May in a 2–1 home win over Parma, making him the club's second-most capped player of all time, after Totti.

=== Boca Juniors and retirement ===
While still at Roma, De Rossi expressed his lifelong admiration for Argentine club Boca Juniors and its fans, which led to speculation surrounding a future move to the club, which was also fueled by the presence of former teammate Nicolás Burdisso as the club's sporting director. Negotiations started following his departure from Roma, and he was officially signed by Boca on 26 July 2019 on a one-year contract. On 13 August 2019, De Rossi made his debut for Boca Juniors against Club Almagro in the Copa Argentina, marking the occasion by scoring his first goal for the club in an eventual 1–1 draw; Boca Juniors were ultimately eliminated from the competition, however, following a 3–1 loss on penalties. He made his Primera División debut on 19 August, starting in a 2–0 home win over Aldosivi at La Bombonera. He made his debut in the Copa Libertadores on 28 August, coming on as a second-half substitute in a 0–0 home draw against Quito, which saw Boca progress to the semi-finals of the competition following a 3–0 win on aggregate; Boca were eliminated in the following round, after a 2–1 aggregate loss to domestic rivals River Plate, a tie in which De Rossi did not appear, however.

On 6 January 2020, De Rossi announced his retirement from professional football, citing family reasons for his decision. Boca eventually finished the 2019–20 season as Primera División champions.

== International career ==
De Rossi is the highest scoring midfielder for the Italy national side post-World War II, with 21 goals in 117 international appearances, and the all-time second highest-scoring midfielder for Italy, behind only Adolfo Baloncieri. He is also the joint fifth-most capped player for the Italy national team.

=== Youth and early senior career ===
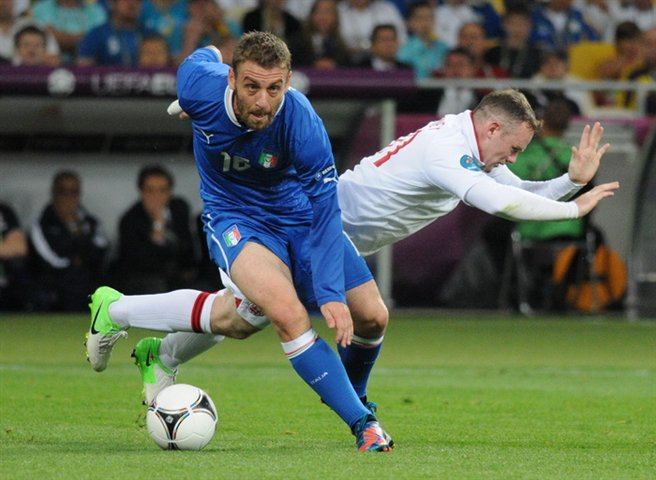
De Rossi playing for Italy in 2012

De Rossi played 16 matches for the Italy national under-21 football team and was a regular first-team member of the squad that won the 2004 UEFA European Under-21 Football Championship, scoring the opening goal in Italy's 3–0 win over Serbia and Montenegro in the final. In the same year, he also won a bronze medal in football with the Italy national football team at the 2004 Summer Olympics in Athens.

A few weeks after returning from Greece, De Rossi earned his first cap with the Italy senior squad on 4 September 2004, scoring on his international debut in a 2–1 win against Norway in a 2006 World Cup qualifying match, at the age of 21. He wore Italy's captain's armband for the first time in the second half of a 0–0 friendly draw against Iceland on 30 March 2005.

=== 2006 World Cup ===
De Rossi was named to Marcello Lippi's 23-man Italian squad for the 2006 FIFA World Cup, producing a notable performance in Italy's opening 2–0 win against Ghana, but also picking up a booking in the tenth minute. He started once again in the second group match against the United States; however, he received a straight red card after he elbowed Brian McBride in the face. McBride left the pitch bloodied but returned after treatment, later receiving three stitches. The BBC stated that De Rossi had "disgraced himself with a sickening, needless elbow on Brian McBride." De Rossi later apologised to McBride, who subsequently praised him as "classy" for approaching him after the match. Because of the incident, De Rossi was banned for four matches, and was fined CHF 10,000.

After having been disqualified for four matches, De Rossi returned to the pitch in the World Cup final against France, coming on as a substitute in the 61st minute, for Roma teammate Francesco Totti. After a 1–1 deadlock following extra time, the match went to a penalty shoot-out; De Rossi scored Italy's third penalty to help his team win the shoot-out and their fourth World Cup title. At the age of 22, De Rossi was the youngest player in Italy's World Cup squad.

=== Euro 2008 ===
De Rossi played in all of Italy's Euro 2008 qualifying games under new manager Roberto Donadoni, scoring a goal in Italy's 3–1 away win against Georgia on 12 October 2006. After Totti decided to retire from international football following Italy's victorious 2006 World Cup final, De Rossi was also given the honour of wearing the number 10 shirt. He also captained the team on three occasions: two friendly matches, against South Africa on 17 October 2007 (his first starting appearance as Italy's captain), and Portugal on 6 February 2008, respectively, and in the Euro 2008 qualifier against the Faroe Islands.

After missing out on Italy's opening 3–0 defeat to the Netherlands, De Rossi featured in all of Italy's remaining matches at UEFA Euro 2008. On 17 June, he scored from a free kick which was deflected off of Thierry Henry's left boot, as Italy defeated France 2–0 in their final group match; this was his fifth international goal, and the win guaranteed Italy's progress to the quarter-finals. De Rossi was named Man of the Match. In the quarter-final penalty shoot-out against eventual champions Spain, his shot was saved by Iker Casillas as Italy lost the shoot-out 4–2 after a 0–0 draw following extra-time. He scored his first double with the national team in a 2–0 home win against Georgia on 10 September 2008, in a 2010 FIFA World Cup qualifying match.

=== 2009 Confederations Cup ===
De Rossi was named to Lippi's Italy squad for the 2009 FIFA Confederations Cup, and was handed the number-10 shirt for the tournament once again. In Italy's opening fixture of the competition on 15 June, De Rossi scored against the United States in the 71st minute with a low long-range strike. The goal put Italy 2–1 up after Giuseppe Rossi had equalised, following Landon Donovan's opener from a penalty in the first half. Italy went on to win the match 3–1, after Andrea Pirlo set up Rossi for his second of the game; De Rossi was named Man of the Match. Italy lost their following two games against Egypt and Brazil, however, and were eliminated in the first round of the tournament, following a three-way, three-point tie in their group with the United States and Egypt.

Due to his performances and dedication at international level, De Rossi was tipped by several in the media to be a possible candidate for Italy's captaincy after the retirement of Fabio Cannavaro. His ability to perform well and score in important matches and his pivotal role in breaking down the opposition's play as a box-to-box midfielder won him admiration from the Italian fans. Indeed, De Rossi scored several crucial goals for Italy in their Euro 2008 and 2010 FIFA World Cup qualifying campaigns; at the international level, De Rossi's goal ratio was much greater than at club level during this period, as he played mainly as a defensive midfielder for Roma, whereas he was able to play in more advanced positions for Italy, due to the presence of Gennaro Gattuso in the team's holding midfielder role.

=== 2010 World Cup ===
De Rossi scored Italy's first goal of the 2010 FIFA World Cup against Paraguay, as they drew their opening match 1–1. In the second match, against New Zealand, after Italy were trailing by a goal, he drew a foul in the penalty area, from which Vincenzo Iaquinta equalised, as Italy once again drew 1–1. The decision to give the penalty was criticised by some in the media, who perceived that De Rossi had dived. Despite the controversy, De Rossi received the FIFA Man of the Match award. The defending champions lost their final match against Slovakia 3–2, and were eliminated in the first round of the tournament, finishing in last place in their group, without a victory.

=== Euro 2012 ===
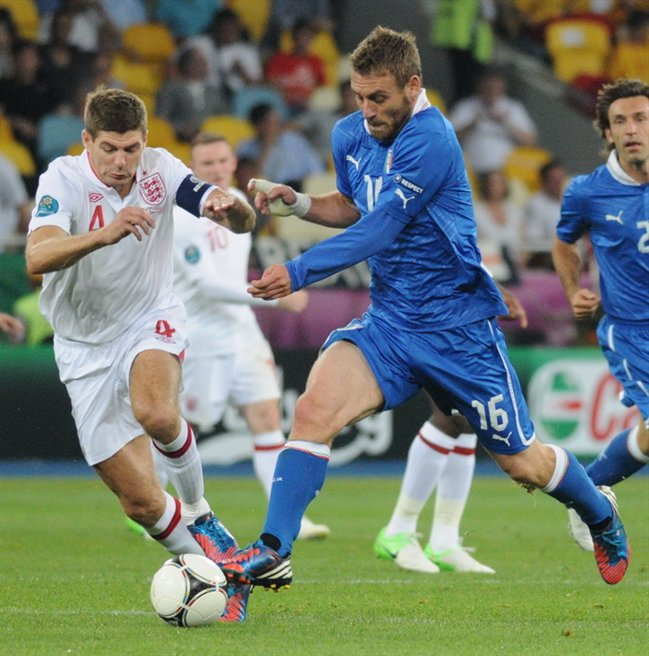
De Rossi (right) with Steven Gerrard of England in Italy's Euro 2012 quarter-final

Following Lippi's departure after the 2010 World Cup, in Italy's first match under new manager Cesare Prandelli, a friendly against the Ivory Coast, De Rossi was named captain, due to the injury of newly appointed captain Gianluigi Buffon, as well as the absence of acting captain Andrea Pirlo; Italy lost the match 1–0. On 7 September, he scored his tenth goal for Italy in a 5–0 home win over the Faroe Islands in a UEFA Euro 2012 qualifying match; the goal allowed him to overtake Totti as Roma's highest goalscorer with the national side.

In May 2012, De Rossi was named to Prandelli's final 23-man squad for UEFA Euro 2012. Due to Andrea Barzagli's pre-tournament injury, however, De Rossi played as a central defender in a three-man defence in Prandelli's 3–5–2 formation, alongside Giorgio Chiellini and Leonardo Bonucci, during Italy's opening two group matches of the competition against Spain and Croatia, which both ended in 1–1 draws, receiving praise for his performances in the media; he was temporarily replaced by Thiago Motta and Riccardo Montolivo alongside Pirlo and Marchisio in Italy's three-man midfield. He then played a more regular midfield-role against the Republic of Ireland in the last group match, partnering with Claudio Marchisio and Andrea Pirlo. He continued to play as a midfielder against England in the quarter-final, in which Italy went through after a penalty shootout victory. De Rossi also played the entire semi-final against Germany, as Italy won the match 2–1, and also played all 90 minutes in Italy's 4–0 defeat to Spain in the final. De Rossi was included in the Team of the Tournament for his performances.

=== 2013 Confederations Cup ===
In June 2013, De Rossi was called up for the 2013 FIFA Confederations Cup in Brazil, and he scored in a 4–3 win over Japan in Italy's second group game. The victory allowed Italy to progress to the semi-finals of the tournament for the first time in their history. Italy eventually finished the tournament in third place after a penalty shoot-out victory over Uruguay in the bronze medal match, in which De Rossi appeared.

=== 2014 World Cup ===
De Rossi was included in Prandelli's final 23-man squad for the 2014 World Cup in Brazil, the only Roma player to be selected to the national team. In Italy's 2–1 opening win against England, De Rossi had a dominant match in the Italian midfield, playing in front of the defence for the entire match and completing the most passes of any player, after Andrea Pirlo, with 99. Italy dominated possession and, with a 93.2 pass percentage, also managed to record the highest pass accuracy percentage of any team in a World Cup match since Denmark in the 1986 FIFA World Cup. Italy lost their other two group matches 1–0, however, against Costa Rica and Uruguay, and were eliminated in the first round for the second consecutive World Cup, finishing third in their group. De Rossi also participated in the second group match against Costa Rica, but was unable to play in Italy's 1–0 loss against Uruguay due to injury.

=== Euro 2016 ===
On 4 September, under Italy's new manager Antonio Conte, De Rossi wore the captain's armband in a 2–0 friendly home win over the Netherlands in Bari, also scoring a goal from a penalty. On 16 November 2014, in a UEFA Euro 2016 qualifying match against Croatia at the San Siro in Milan, De Rossi earned his 100th cap in a 1–1 draw. On 6 September 2015, he scored from a penalty at the six-minute mark in Italy's 1–0 victory over Bulgaria in a Euro 2016 qualifying match in Palermo, and was later sent off during the match for a reactionary foul; this was his second red card with Italy, which made him Italy's most red carded player ever, alongside Giancarlo Antognoni and Franco Causio. On 31 May 2016, he was named to Conte's 23-man Italy squad for UEFA Euro 2016. On 27 June, De Rossi limped off the field in the eventual 2–0 victory round of 16 match up against Spain, which caused him to miss out on the quarter final match against Germany on 2 July, in an eventual 6–5 penalty shoot-out defeat. Many believed an unfit De Rossi would have come on just for the shoot-out, but when accused of refusing to take a kick he responded, "Do I look like the type who would refuse to step-up to the spot? ... Conte didn't ask me, and that's it. I hadn't even warmed up during the game."

=== 2018 World Cup qualifying campaign and retirement ===
On 24 March 2017, De Rossi scored his 20th goal for Italy from the penalty spot in a 2–0 home win over Albania in a 2018 World Cup qualifying match; with the goal, he equalled Paolo Rossi as Italy's twelfth-highest goalscorer of all time. On 28 March, De Rossi made his 112th appearance for Italy in a 2–1 friendly away win over the Netherlands, equalling Dino Zoff as Italy's joint fifth-highest appearance holder; he was later forced off in the 35th minute, however, due to sustaining an injury, and was subsequently replaced by debutant Roberto Gagliardini.

On 10 November, he made his 117th international appearance in a 1–0 away defeat to Sweden, in the first leg of the World Cup play-offs, overtaking Pirlo as Italy's fourth-most capped player of all time; this proved to be his final international appearance. Following a 0–0 home draw in the second leg on 13 November, Italy failed to qualify for the 2018 FIFA World Cup after a 1–0 aggregate loss to Sweden. The goal that Sweden scored had taken a deflection off of De Rossi. Immediately following the second leg match, De Rossi announced his retirement from the national team. Although De Rossi did not feature during the second leg, he was at the centre of media attention due to an incident which occurred while he was on the bench. When he was asked to warm up late during the game, he appeared to protest the decision and instead pointed angrily at Napoli forward Lorenzo Insigne, a player whom the national side's manager, Gian Piero Ventura, had neither started nor brought on, in spite of pressure from the Italian media and criticism from the fans; following the match, De Rossi commented on the incident, stating, "We have this tendency to warm up three at a time, then after five minutes we change, and another three go. I just said we were near the end and had to win, so send the strikers to warm up! I pointed to Insigne too. It wasn't up to me whether it was a tactical issue, and the Prof [Ventura] is a lovely guy, so I'm sorry if I offended anyone. I just thought perhaps it was better that Insigne come on instead."

== Style of play ==
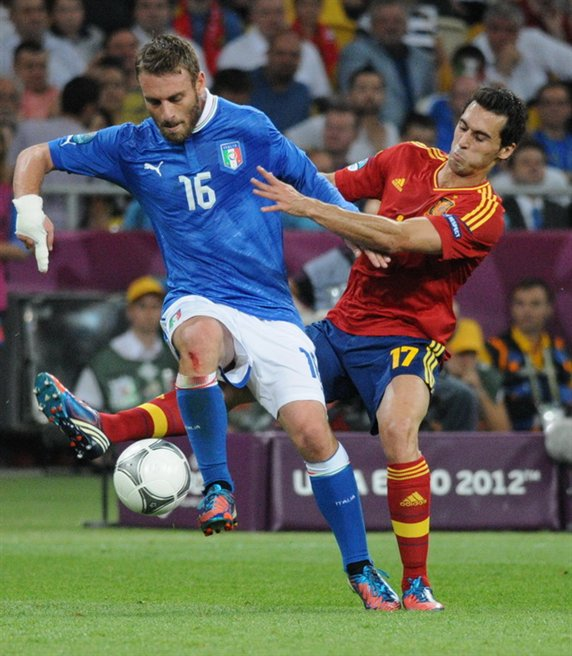
De Rossi (left) challenging Álvaro Arbeloa of Spain in the UEFA Euro 2012 final

Regarded as one of the best midfielders in the world during his prime, De Rossi has been referred to as a "complete midfielder" because of his tackling, vision, awareness, passing range, strength, energy, and goal-scoring ability, which enable him to start counter-attacks or make attacking runs to advance into offensive positions after winning back possession. A quick, physical, hard-working and tenacious player, with good technique and an ability to read the game, he has been praised for his ball skills, stamina, positional sense and ability in the air, as well as his long-distance shooting; he is also an accurate penalty kick and set-piece taker. He has occasionally been criticised, however, for his aggression and tendency to pick up yellow cards unnecessarily.

De Rossi's ability to break down opposition plays and his adeptness at the box-to-box style of midfield play has led pundits to compare him to other world class box-to-box midfielders, such as Frank Lampard and Steven Gerrard. De Rossi has expressed admiration for Gerrard, as well as Roy Keane. Fellow former Roma and Italy midfielder Luigi Di Biagio likened De Rossi's playing style and position as a central midfielder to his own, due to their ability to assist their teams both offensively and defensively. De Rossi is considered to be one of the greatest Italian midfielders of his generation and of all time by pundits and managers. A former striker, De Rossi is a tactically intelligent and versatile player, who can play in various midfield positions, both in a defensive and attacking midfield role, or even as a central midfielder, as a "mezzala", and as a deep-lying playmaker, due to his ability to set the tempo of his team's play in midfield with short passes or create chances with long balls; on occasion, he has also played as a central defender or as a sweeper, or even as a false-attacking midfielder. His role has also been likened to that of a metodista ("centre-half," in Italian football jargon), due to his ability to dictate play in midfield as well as assist his team defensively. Due to his leadership and dedication on the pitch, he has been given the nickname capitan futuro ("future captain") by Roma fans and the media, as he was tipped to succeed Totti as Roma's captain.

== Coaching career ==
=== Early years ===
Immediately after retirement, De Rossi stated his intention to become a coach, and he was quickly linked to several Serie A managerial vacancies between 2020 and 2021, such as Fiorentina, Crotone and Cagliari, all despite still not having the UEFA Pro Licence required to serve as head coach in the Italian top flight. In December 2020, De Rossi started the UEFA A licence course. On 18 March 2021, De Rossi was unveiled as Roberto Mancini's new assistant in charge of the Italy national team. On 11 July 2021, Italy won the UEFA Euro 2020 after a 3–2 victory on penalty shoot-out after a 1–1 draw on extra-time against England in the final.

He successively left the Italian team to complete his UEFA A coaching course; following that, he moved back to a role within the Italian Football Federation, this time as a technical collaborator for the Under-15 to Under-20 youth representatives. In January 2022, he agreed to return to join Roberto Mancini's staff to help for the 2022 FIFA World Cup qualification playoffs.

In September 2022, De Rossi was admitted to the UEFA Pro yearly coaching course organized by the Italian Football Federation, together with fellow 2006 FIFA World Cup winners Marco Amelia, Andrea Barzagli and Alessandro Del Piero.

=== SPAL ===
On 11 October 2022, De Rossi was appointed as the new manager of Serie B side SPAL.

He was dismissed on 14 February 2023, leaving SPAL in eighteenth place in the Serie B league table.

=== Roma ===
On 16 January 2024, De Rossi was appointed head coach of Roma until the end of the season, following the dismissal of José Mourinho. His first match was a 2–1 win over Hellas Verona at home. De Rossi led Roma to the semi-finals of the 2023–24 UEFA Europa League, where they were eliminated by Bayer Leverkusen 4–2 on aggregate. In June 2024, Roma announced that they had extended De Rossi's contract until 2027.

On 18 September 2024, after failing to achieve a single win in the first four games of the season, Roma announced the dismissal of De Rossi from his managerial duties.

=== Genoa ===
On 6 November 2025, De Rossi signed to become the new head coach of Serie A club Genoa.

== Club ownership ==
On 24 January 2025, De Rossi became the owner and chairman of Italian Serie D club Ostiamare, his first team as a youth player.

== Personal life ==
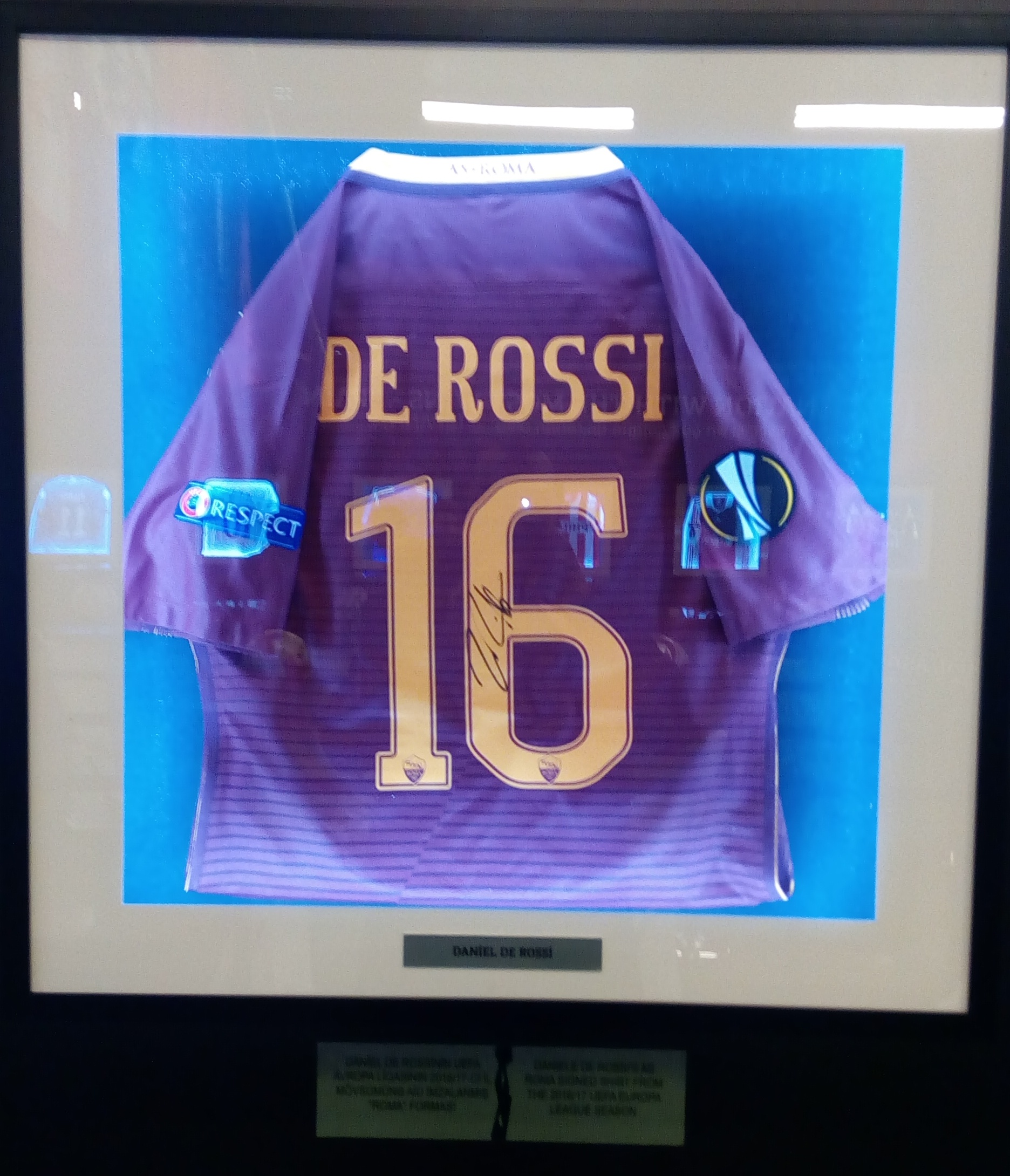
De Rossi's No. 16 shirt

De Rossi was born in Rome. He is the son of Alberto De Rossi, former Roma's Primavera coach. He married Tamara Pisnoli on 18 May 2006, the mother of his daughter and ex-dancer of Mediaset, Sarabanda. The couple separated in early 2009. On 29 December 2006, according to a survey for the Italian edition of Men's Health, he was named Italian athlete of the year for 2007. De Rossi made his debut for Roma wearing the number 27 shirt, which he wore for two seasons. He then switched to the number 4, which he also wore during the 2006 World Cup. With the birth of his daughter on 16 June 2005, he changed to number 16 during the 2005–06 season, which one of his idols, Roy Keane, had also worn.

De Rossi was chosen as a Pringles spokesperson for Euro 2008, along with other top European football players such as Thierry Henry, Fernando Torres, Alexander Frei, Philipp Lahm and Michael Owen. He also appears in an Adidas "Dream Big" commercial along with Steven Gerrard, Michael Ballack and David Beckham.

De Rossi is featured on the cover of the Italian edition of EA Sports' FIFA 09 video game. The picture on the cover is taken from De Rossi's emphatic goal-scoring celebration after scoring against Internazionale in the Supercoppa Italiana in 2008.

De Rossi has a tattoo on his leg of a mocked-up triangular "hazard" sign of a tackle being performed, reflecting his tough-tackling reputation.

On 26 December 2015, De Rossi married his partner, English-born Italian actress and model Sarah Felberbaum, in a private ceremony in the Maldives; the couple had been in a relationship since 2011, and have a daughter together, born on 14 February 2014, and a son together, born on 3 September 2016.

In March 2016, he put his World Cup winner's medal in the coffin of Pietro Lombardi, who had been the kitman of the Italy national team in the 2006 World Cup.

On 9 April 2021, it was announced that De Rossi had become hospitalised in Rome due to COVID-19 symptoms; by 13 April, he had been discharged, and by 26 April, he had recovered.

== Career statistics ==
=== Club ===
Appearances and goals by club, season and competition
Club	Season	League			National cup (Note: Includes Coppa Italia, Copa Argentina)		Continental		Other		Total	
Club	Season	Division	Apps	Goals	Apps	Goals	Apps	Goals	Apps	Goals	Apps	Goals
Roma	2001–02	Serie A	0	0	3	0	1 (Note: Appearances in UEFA Champions League)	0	0	0	4	0
Roma	2002–03	Serie A	4	2	3	0	0	0	—		7	2
Roma	2003–04	Serie A	17	0	4	0	6 (Note: Appearances in UEFA Cup)	1	—		27	1
Roma	2004–05	Serie A	30	2	5	1	3	1	—		38	4
Roma	2005–06	Serie A	34	6	4	0	7	0	—		45	6
Roma	2006–07	Serie A	36	2	8	2	10	2	1 (Note: Appearance in Supercoppa Italiana)	0	55	6
Roma	2007–08	Serie A	34	5	6	0	10	0	1	1	51	6
Roma	2008–09	Serie A	33	3	2	0	7	0	1	1	43	4
Roma	2009–10	Serie A	33	7	4	1	12 (Note: Appearances in UEFA Europa League)	3	—		49	11
Roma	2010–11	Serie A	28	2	4	0	7	1	1	0	40	3
Roma	2011–12	Serie A	32	4	0	0	0	0	—		32	4
Roma	2012–13	Serie A	25	0	4	0	—		—		29	0
Roma	2013–14	Serie A	32	1	4	0	—		—		36	1
Roma	2014–15	Serie A	26	2	1	1	7 (Note: Three appearances in UEFA Champions League, four appearances in UEFA Europa League)	0	—		34	3
Roma	2015–16	Serie A	24	1	1	0	6	2	—		31	3
Roma	2016–17	Serie A	31	4	1	0	8 (Note: Two appearances in UEFA Champions League, six appearances and one goal in UEFA Europa League)	1	—		40	5
Roma	2017–18	Serie A	22	1	0	0	10	1	—		32	2
Roma	2018–19	Serie A	18	1	1	0	4	1	—		23	2
Roma	Total		459	43	55	5	98	13	4	2	616	63
Boca Juniors	2019–20	Argentine Primera División	5	0	1	1	1 (Note: Appearance in Copa Libertadores)	0	0	0	7	1
Career total			464	43	56	6	99	13	4	2	623	64

=== International ===
Appearances and goals by national team and year
National team	Year	Apps	Goals
Italy
Italy	2004	4	2
Italy	2005	10	0
Italy	2006	11	2
Italy	2007	6	0
Italy	2008	11	3
Italy	2009	9	1
Italy	2010	11	2
Italy	2011	8	0
Italy	2012	12	3
Italy	2013	11	2
Italy	2014	7	1
Italy	2015	1	1
Italy	2016	9	2
Italy	2017	7	2
Total		117	21

Italy score listed first, score column indicates score after each De Rossi goal.

International goals by date, venue, opponent, score, result and competition
No.	Date	Venue	Opponent	Score	Result	Competition
1	4 September 2004	Stadio Renzo Barbera, Palermo, Italy	Norway	1–1	2–1	2006 FIFA World Cup qualification
2	13 October 2004	Stadio Ennio Tardini, Parma, Italy	Belarus	2–0	4–3	2006 FIFA World Cup qualification
3	1 March 2006	Stadio Artemio Franchi, Florence, Italy	Germany	3–0	4–1	Friendly
4	11 October 2006	Boris Paichadze Stadium, Tbilisi, Georgia	Georgia	1–0	3–1	UEFA Euro 2008 qualifying
5	17 June 2008	Letzigrund, Zürich, Switzerland	France	2–0	2–0	UEFA Euro 2008
6	10 September 2008	Stadio Friuli, Udine, Italy	Georgia	1–0	2–0	2010 FIFA World Cup qualification
7	10 September 2008	Stadio Friuli, Udine, Italy	Georgia	2–0	2–0	2010 FIFA World Cup qualification
8	15 June 2009	Loftus Versfeld Stadium, Pretoria, South Africa	United States	2–1	3–1	2009 FIFA Confederations Cup
9	14 June 2010	Cape Town Stadium, Cape Town, South Africa	Paraguay	1–1	1–1	2010 FIFA World Cup
10	7 September 2010	Stadio Artemio Franchi, Florence, Italy	Faroe Islands	2–0	5–0	UEFA Euro 2012 qualifying
11	15 August 2012	Stade de Suisse, Bern, Switzerland	England	1–0	1–2	Friendly
12	12 October 2012	Hrazdan Stadium, Yerevan, Armenia	Armenia	2–1	3–1	2014 FIFA World Cup qualification
13	16 October 2012	Stadio Giuseppe Meazza, Milan, Italy	Denmark	2–0	3–1	2014 FIFA World Cup qualification
14	21 March 2013	Stade de Genève, Geneva, Switzerland	Brazil	1–2	2–2	Friendly
15	19 June 2013	Arena Pernambuco, Recife, Brazil	Japan	1–2	4–3	2013 FIFA Confederations Cup
16	4 September 2014	Stadio San Nicola, Bari, Italy	Netherlands	2–0	2–0	Friendly
17	6 September 2015	Stadio Renzo Barbera, Palermo, Italy	Bulgaria	1–0	1–0	UEFA Euro 2016 qualifying
18	6 June 2016	Stadio Marc'Antonio Bentegodi, Verona, Italy	Finland	2–0	2–0	Friendly
19	6 October 2016	Juventus Stadium, Turin, Italy	Spain	1–1	1–1	2018 FIFA World Cup qualification
20	24 March 2017	Stadio Renzo Barbera, Palermo, Italy	Albania	1–0	2–0	2018 FIFA World Cup qualification
21	7 June 2017	Allianz Riviera Stadium, Nice, France	Uruguay	3–0	3–0	Friendly

== Managerial statistics ==
As of 22 November 2026

Managerial record by team and tenure
Team	Nat.	From	To	Record							
Team	Nat.	From	To	G	W	D	L	GF	GA	GD	Win %
SPAL	(Italy)	11 October 2022	14 February 2023	17	3	6	8	18	20	−2	17.65
Roma	(Italy)	16 January 2024	18 September 2024	30	14	9	7	46	33	+13	46.67
Genoa	(Italy)	6 November 2025	Present	43	16	9	18	53	58	−5	37.21
Total				90	33	24	33	117	111	+6	36.67

== Honours ==
Roma

- Coppa Italia: 2006–07, 2007–08
- Supercoppa Italiana: 2007

Boca Juniors

- Primera División: 2019–20

Italy U21

- UEFA European Under-21 Championship: 2004

Italy U23

- Olympic Bronze Medal: 2004

Italy

- FIFA World Cup: 2006
- UEFA European Championship runner-up: 2012

Individual

- Serie A Young Footballer of the Year: 2006
- Serie A Italian Footballer of the Year: 2009
- FIFA FIFPro World XI nominee: 2009
- Italian Athlete of the Year: 2010
- UEFA European Championship Team of the Tournament: 2012
- Premio Bulgarelli Number 8: 2017
- Gazzetta Sports Awards Legend: 2021
- Italian Football Hall of Fame: 2023
- IFFHS Legends

Orders

- 5th Class / Knight: Cavaliere Ordine al Merito della Repubblica Italiana: 2004

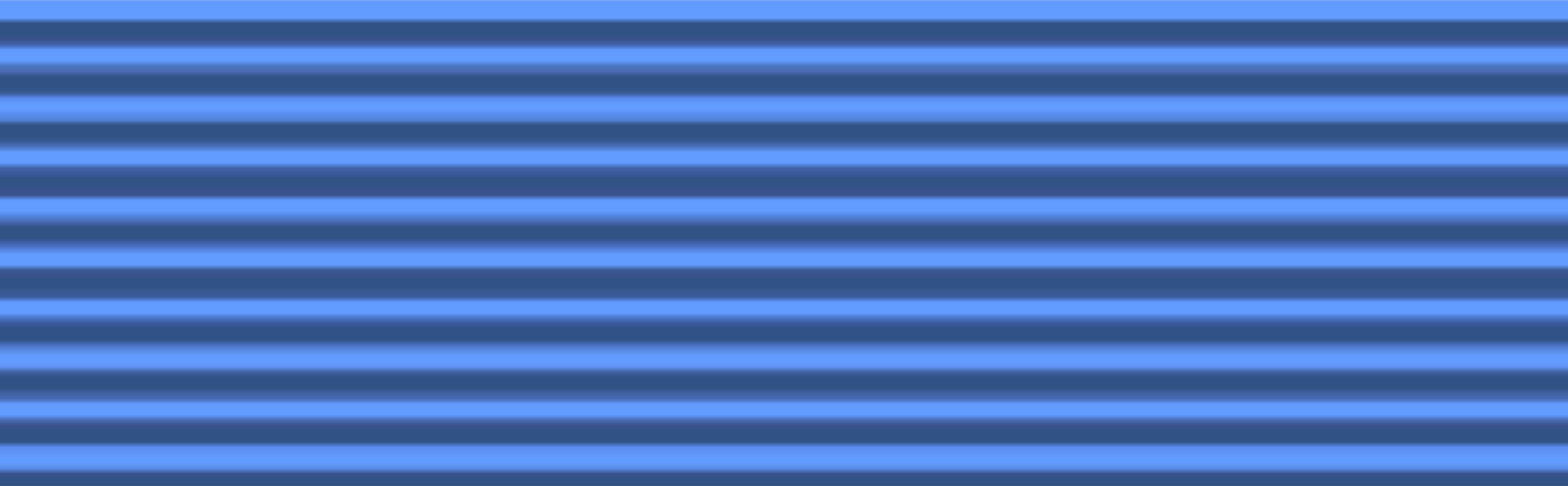
- CONI: Golden Collar of Sports Merit: Collare d'Oro al Merito Sportivo: 2006

- 4th Class / Official: Ufficiale Ordine al Merito della Repubblica Italiana: 2006

== See also ==
- List of footballers with 100 or more caps
