= Leandro Castán =

Brazilian footballer

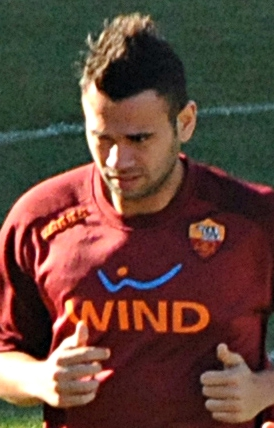
- Castán training with Roma in 2012

Personal information
- Full name: Leandro Castán da Silva
- Date of birth: 5 November 1986 (age 40)
- Place of birth: Jaú, São Paulo, Brazil
- Height: 1.86 m (6 ft 1 in)
- Position: Central defender

Youth career
- 2003–2006: Atlético Mineiro

Senior career*
Years	Team	Apps	(Gls)
2005–2007	Atlético Mineiro	41	(1)
2007–2008	Helsingborg	7	(1)
2008–2009	Barueri	66	(4)
2010–2012	Corinthians	111	(2)
2012–2018	Roma	81	(1)
2016	→ Sampdoria (loan)	0	(0)
2016–2017	→ Torino (loan)	14	(0)
2018	→ Cagliari (loan)	14	(0)
2018–2021	Vasco da Gama	145	(2)
2022	Guarani	8	(0)
Total		487	(11)

International career
2012–2013	Brazil	2	(0)
- * Club domestic league appearances and goals

Leandro Castán da Silva (born 5 November 1986) is a Brazilian former international footballer who played as a centre-back.

== Club career ==
=== Roma ===
In the 2012–13 season, he was signed by Roma for a transfer fee of €5.5 million from Corinthians. He earned a place in the starting XI thanks to a number of consecutive solid performances. He scored his first goal for Roma on 8 December 2012 in a 4–2 win over Fiorentina.

In the 2013–14 season, Castán broke into the Roma first team; he cited new manager Rudi Garcia for this.

==== Torino (loan) ====
On 10 July 2016, it was announced that Castán would be loaned to Sampdoria for the 2016–17 season. However, on 18 August, just two days prior to the start of the new season, Sampdoria confirmed that the loan had been terminated and that the player had joined Torino on loan instead. Castán featured in three out of five of the blucerchiati's pre-season matches, including their 3–2 away defeat against FC Barcelona in the Joan Gamper Trophy.

==== Cagliari (loan) ====
On 11 January 2018, Castán joined Cagliari on a six-month loan deal.

=== Vasco da Gama ===
On 3 August 2018, the player signed for Vasco da Gama.

== International career ==
Castán said he did not believe that he would be called up by Scolari to play at the 2014 FIFA World Cup because of Dante, also a left foot defender, already being on the list.
