= 2017–18 AS Roma season =

Roma
2017–18 season
- President: James Pallotta
- Manager: Eusebio Di Francesco
- Stadium: Stadio Olimpico
- Serie A: 3rd
- Coppa Italia: Round of 16
- UEFA Champions League: Semi-finals
- Top goalscorer: League: Edin Džeko (16); All: Edin Džeko (24)
- Highest home attendance: 61,889 vs Liverpool (2 May 2018, Champions League)
- Lowest home attendance: 27,206 vs Torino (20 December 2017, Coppa Italia)
- Average home league attendance: 37,450
Home colours	Away colours	Third colours

The 2017–18 season was Associazione Sportiva Roma's 90th in existence and 89th season in the top flight of Italian football. The club competed in Serie A, the Coppa Italia, and the UEFA Champions League, qualifying directly to the group stage after finishing runners-up to Juventus.

The season was the first since 1991–92 that Francesco Totti was not part of the first-team squad, having retired at the end of the previous season. On 13 June 2017, former Sassuolo coach Eusebio Di Francesco was appointed as Roma manager, replacing Luciano Spalletti, who left for Inter.

On 5 December 2017, the Stadio della Roma project – after experiencing five years of delays due to conflicting interests from various parties in the local government – was given the go-ahead to begin construction. It will replace the Stadio Olimpico as Roma's ground.

== Players ==
=== Squad information ===
Last updated on 20 May 2018
Appearances and goals include all competitions

No.	Player	Nat.	Position(s)	Date of birth (age at end of season)	Signed from	Signed in	Contract ends	Apps	Goals
Goalkeepers
1	Alisson	(Brazil)	GK	2 October 1992 (aged 25)	(Brazil) Internacional	2016	2021	64	0
18	Bogdan Lobonț	(Romania)	GK	18 January 1978 (aged 40)	(Romania) Dinamo București	2009	2018	28	0
28	Łukasz Skorupski	(Poland)	GK	5 May 1991 (aged 27)	(Poland) Górnik Zabrze	2013	2021	16	0
Defenders
5	Juan Jesus	(Brazil)	CB / LB	10 June 1991 (aged 27)	(Italy) Internazionale	2016	2020	62	0
11	Aleksandar Kolarov	(Serbia)	LB	10 November 1985 (aged 32)	(England) Manchester City	2017	2020	47	3
13	Elio Capradossi	(Italy)	CB	11 March 1996 (aged 22)	(Italy) Youth Sector	2015	2020	2	0
20	Federico Fazio	(Argentina)	CB	17 March 1987 (aged 31)	(England) Tottenham Hotspur	2016	2019	93	6
25	Bruno Peres	(Brazil)	RB	1 March 1990 (aged 28)	(Italy) Torino	2016	2021	67	2
26	Rick Karsdorp	(Netherlands)	RB	11 February 1995 (aged 23)	(Netherlands) Feyenoord	2017	2022	1	0
33	Jonathan Silva	(Argentina)	LB	29 January 1994 (aged 24)	(Portugal) Sporting CP	2018	2018	2	0
44	Kostas Manolas	(Greece)	CB	14 June 1991 (aged 27)	(Greece) Olympiacos	2014	2022	171	7
Midfielders
4	Radja Nainggolan	(Belgium)	CM / AM	4 May 1988 (aged 30)	(Italy) Cagliari	2014	2021	203	33
6	Kevin Strootman	(Netherlands)	DM / CM	13 February 1990 (aged 28)	(Netherlands) PSV Eindhoven	2013	2022	147	15
7	Lorenzo Pellegrini	(Italy)	CM	19 June 1996 (aged 22)	(Italy) Sassuolo	2017	2022	38	3
16	Daniele De Rossi (captain)	(Italy)	DM / CM	24 July 1983 (aged 34)	(Italy) Youth Sector	2001	2019	594	61
21	Maxime Gonalons	(France)	DM / CM	10 March 1989 (aged 29)	(France) Lyon	2017	2021	23	0
24	Alessandro Florenzi (vice-captain)	(Italy)	RB / CM / RW	11 March 1991 (aged 27)	(Italy) Youth Sector	2011	2019	223	25
30	Gerson	(Brazil)	CM / AM	20 May 1997 (aged 21)	(Brazil) Fluminense	2016	2021	42	2
Forwards
8	Diego Perotti	(Argentina)	AM / LW / RW	26 July 1988 (aged 29)	(Italy) Genoa	2016	2021	97	21
9	Edin Džeko	(Bosnia and Herzegovina)	CF / ST	17 March 1986 (aged 32)	(England) Manchester City	2015	2020	139	73
14	Patrik Schick	(Czech Republic)	CF / ST	24 January 1996 (aged 22)	(Italy) Sampdoria	2017	2018	26	3
17	Cengiz Ünder	(Turkey)	LW / RW	14 July 1997 (aged 20)	(Turkey) İstanbul Başakşehir	2017	2022	32	8
23	Grégoire Defrel	(France)	ST / RW	17 June 1991 (aged 27)	(Italy) Sassuolo	2017	2022	20	1
48	Mirko Antonucci	(Italy)	LW / RW	11 March 1999 (aged 19)	(Italy) Youth Sector	2016	2020	3	0
92	Stephan El Shaarawy	(Italy)	LW	27 October 1992 (aged 25)	(Italy) Milan	2016	2022	106	29
Players transferred during the season
15	Héctor Moreno	(Mexico)	CB	17 January 1988 (aged 30)	(Netherlands) PSV Eindhoven	2017	2021	6	0
32	Marco Tumminello	(Italy)	ST	6 November 1998 (aged 19)	(Italy) Youth Sector	2015	2022	2	0
33	Emerson	(Italy)	LB	13 March 1994 (aged 24)	(Brazil) Santos	2015	2021	47	2
55	Leandro Castán	(Brazil)	CB	5 November 1986 (aged 31)	(Brazil) Corinthians	2012	2019	81	1

== Transfers ==
=== In ===
Date	Pos.	Player	Age	Moving from	Fee	Notes	Source
13 June 2017	DF	(Mexico) Héctor Moreno	29	(Netherlands) PSV Eindhoven	€5M		
28 June 2017	DF	(Netherlands) Rick Karsdorp	22	(Netherlands) Feyenoord	€14M	€14M + €5M in bonuses	
30 June 2017	MF	(Italy) Lorenzo Pellegrini	21	(Italy) Sassuolo	€10M		
1 July 2017	DF	(Brazil) Leandro Castán	30	(Italy) Torino	Loan return		
1 July 2017	GK	(Poland) Łukasz Skorupski	26	(Italy) Empoli	Loan return		
3 July 2017	MF	(France) Maxime Gonalons	28	(France) Lyon	€5M		
16 July 2017	FW	(Turkey) Cengiz Ünder	20	(Turkey) İstanbul Başakşehir	€13.4M	€13.4M + €1.5M in bonuses	
22 July 2017	DF	(Serbia) Aleksandar Kolarov	31	(England) Manchester City	€5M		
1 August 2017	MF	(Denmark) Rezan Corlu	19	(Denmark) Brøndby	Undisclosed		
20 January 2018	FW	(Italy) Edoardo Soleri	20	(Italy) Spezia	Loan return		
20 January 2018	MF	(Italy) Lorenzo Di Livio	21	(Italy) Reggina	Loan return		
23 January 2018	DF	(Italy) Arturo Calabresi	21	(Italy) Spezia	Loan return		
26 January 2018	FW	(Nigeria) Umar Sadiq	20	(Italy) Torino	Loan return		
26 January 2018	DF	(Senegal) Moustapha Seck	21	(Italy) Empoli	Loan return		
30 January 2018	MF	(Equatorial Guinea) Pepín	21	(Italy) Brescia	Loan return		
30 January 2018	FW	(Italy) Filippo Franchi	20	(Italy) Akragas	Loan return		
31 January 2018	DF	(Italy) Elio Capradossi	21	(Italy) Bari	Loan return		

==== Loans in ====
Date	Pos.	Player	Age	Moving from	Fee	Notes	Source
20 July 2017	FW	(France) Grégoire Defrel	26	(Italy) Sassuolo	€5M	€5M + €15M obligation to buy	
29 August 2017	FW	(Czech Republic) Patrik Schick	21	(Italy) Sampdoria	€5M	€5M + €9M obligation to buy	
31 January 2018	DF	(Argentina) Jonathan Silva	23	(Portugal) Sporting CP	Loan	Loan with an option to buy	

=== Out ===
Date	Pos.	Player	Age	Moving to	Fee	Notes	Source
22 June 2017	FW	(Egypt) Mohamed Salah	25	(England) Liverpool	€42M	€42M + €8M in bonuses	
30 June 2017	FW	(Italy) Federico Ricci	23	(Italy) Sassuolo	Undisclosed		
1 July 2017	MF	(Argentina) Leandro Paredes	23	(Russia) Zenit Saint Petersburg	€23M	€23M + €4M in bonuses	
1 July 2017	FW	(Cameroon) Franck Cedric	22	Unattached	Free	End of contract	
1 July 2017	MF	(Italy) Davide Frattesi	17	(Italy) Sassuolo	€5M	Buy-back clause included	
1 July 2017	FW	(Italy) Marco Frediani	23	(Italy) Parma	Free	Free transfer	
1 July 2017	DF	(Italy) Riccardo Marchizza	19	(Italy) Sassuolo	€3M	Buy-back clause & 50% of any future fee included	
1 July 2017	MF	(France) Clément Grenier	27	(France) Lyon	Loan return		
1 July 2017	GK	(Lithuania) Tomas Švedkauskas	23	Unattached	Free	End of contract	
1 July 2017	GK	(Poland) Wojciech Szczęsny	27	(England) Arsenal	Loan return		
1 July 2017	FW	(Italy) Francesco Totti	40	Retired			
1 July 2017	DF	(Belgium) Thomas Vermaelen	31	(Spain) Barcelona	Loan return		
1 July 2017	DF	(Italy) Massimo Sammartino	21	Unattached	Free	End of contract	
1 July 2017	MF	(Italy) Simone Battaglia	22	Unattached	Free	End of contract	
7 July 2017	GK	(Romania) Ionuţ Pop	19	(Italy) Alessandria	Undisclosed		
9 July 2017	DF	(Germany) Antonio Rüdiger	24	(England) Chelsea	€35M	€35M + €4M in bonuses	
13 July 2017	DF	(Argentina) Tiago Casasola	21	(Italy) Alessandria	Undisclosed		
21 July 2017	FW	(Serbia) Nemanja Radonjić	21	(Serbia) Red Star Belgrade	Free	Free Transfer	
31 July 2017	DF	(Italy) Paolo Frascatore	25	(Italy) Südtirol	Undisclosed		
31 August 2017	DF	(Serbia) Petar Golubović	23	(Italy) Novara	Undisclosed		
4 September 2017	MF	(France) William Vainqueur	28	(Turkey) Antalyaspor	Undisclosed		
9 January 2018	FW	(Italy) Riccardo Cappa	18	(Italy) Sassuolo	Undisclosed		
30 January 2018	DF	(Italy) Emerson Palmieri	23	(England) Chelsea	€20M	€20M + €9M in bonuses	
31 January 2018	DF	(Mexico) Héctor Moreno	30	(Spain) Real Sociedad	€6M		

==== Loans out ====
Date	Pos.	Player	Age	Moving to	Fee	Notes	Source
29 June 2017	MF	(Italy) Nicola Falasco	23	(Italy) Avellino	Loan	Loan with an obligation to buy	
30 June 2017	FW	(Ivory Coast) Seydou Doumbia	29	(Portugal) Sporting CP	Loan	Loan with an option to buy	
30 June 2017	FW	(Italy) Edoardo Soleri	19	(Italy) Spezia	Loan	Loan with an option to buy	
3 July 2017	MF	(Italy) Christian D'Urso	19	(Italy) Ascoli	Loan	Loan with an option to buy	
7 July 2017	FW	(Italy) Daniele Verde	21	(Italy) Hellas Verona	Loan	Loan with an option to buy	
7 July 2017	DF	(Italy) Arturo Calabresi	21	(Italy) Spezia	Loan	Loan with an option to buy	
7 July 2017	MF	(Morocco) Ismail H'Maidat	22	(Belgium) Westerlo	Loan		
8 July 2017	MF	(Equatorial Guinea) Pepín	20	(Italy) Brescia	Loan	Loan with an option to buy	
10 July 2017	FW	(Argentina) Ezequiel Ponce	20	(France) Lille	Loan	Loan with an option to buy	
11 July 2017	DF	(Bosnia and Herzegovina) Ervin Zukanović	30	(Italy) Genoa	Loan	Loan with an obligation to buy	
11 July 2017	DF	(Italy) Elio Capradossi	21	(Italy) Bari	Loan		
11 July 2017	MF	(Italy) Lorenzo Di Livio	20	(Italy) Reggina	Loan		
12 July 2017	DF	(Italy) Andrea Paolelli	19	(Italy) Gubbio	Loan		
12 July 2017	GK	(Italy) Lorenzo Crisanto	19	(Italy) Siena	Loan		
13 July 2017	DF	(Portugal) Mário Rui	26	(Italy) Napoli	€3.75M	Loan with an obligation to buy for €5.5M	
15 July 2017	MF	(Italy) Matteo Ricci	23	(Italy) Salernitana	Loan	Loan with an option to buy	
15 July 2017	MF	(Italy) Lorenzo Vasco	20	(Italy) Racing Roma	Loan		
18 July 2017	FW	(Italy) Giammario Piscitella	24	(Italy) Prato	Loan		
21 July 2017	FW	(Italy) Jacopo Ferri	22	(Italy) Piacenza	Loan		
27 July 2017	DF	(Senegal) Moustapha Seck	21	(Italy) Empoli	Loan	Loan with an option to buy	
9 August 2017	FW	(Uruguay) Kevin Méndez	21	(Italy) Viterbese	Loan		
16 August 2017	FW	(Nigeria) Umar Sadiq	20	(Italy) Torino	Loan	Loan with an option to buy	
21 August 2017	FW	(Paraguay) Juan Iturbe	24	(Mexico) Tijuana	Loan	Loan with an obligation to buy for €5M	
31 August 2017	DF	(Slovakia) Norbert Gyömbér	25	(Italy) Bari	Loan	Loan with an option to buy	
31 August 2017	FW	(Italy) Marco Tumminello	18	(Italy) Crotone	Loan		
11 January 2018	DF	(Brazil) Leandro Castán	31	(Italy) Cagliari	Loan		
11 January 2018	DF	(Austria) Denis Omic	18	(Austria) Blau-Weiß Linz	Loan		
20 January 2018	FW	(Italy) Edoardo Soleri	20	(Spain) Almería	Loan		
20 January 2018	MF	(Italy) Lorenzo Di Livio	21	(Italy) Matera	Loan	6-month loan	
23 January 2018	DF	(Italy) Arturo Calabresi	21	(Italy) Foggia	Loan	6-month loan	
26 January 2018	DF	(Senegal) Moustapha Seck	21	(Italy) Novara	Loan	6-month loan	
27 January 2018	FW	(Nigeria) Umar Sadiq	20	(Netherlands) NAC Breda	Loan	Loan with an option to extend until June 2019	
31 January 2018	DF	(Nigeria) Nura Abdullahi	20	(Italy) Perugia	Loan	18-month loan through June 2019	
31 January 2018	MF	(Equatorial Guinea) Pepín	21	(Italy) Pescara	Loan	6-month loan	
31 January 2018	FW	(Italy) Filippo Franchi	20	(Italy) Reggina	Loan	6-month loan	

== Pre-season and friendlies ==
11 July 2017 Friendly	Pinzolo Val Rendena (Italy)	0–8	(Italy) Roma	Pinzolo, Italy
11:00 CEST (UTC+2:00)		Report	Perotti 8' (pen.), 36'; Castán 13'; Cappa 17'; Tumminello 26', 43'; Ricci 28'; Ciavattini 48'	Stadium: Stadio Pineta; Referee: Simone Sozza

14 July 2017 Friendly	Roma (Italy)	1–0	(Czech Republic) Slovácko	Pinzolo, Italy
10:00 CEST (UTC+2:00)	Sadiq 77'	Report		Stadium: Stadio Pineta; Referee: Daniel Amabile

19 July 2017 ICC	Roma (Italy)	1–1 (3–5 p)	(France) Paris Saint-Germain	Detroit, United States
20:00 EDT (UTC−04:00)	Sadiq 60'; Seck (yellow card) 88'	Report	Rabiot (yellow card) 18'; Marquinhos 36', (yellow card) 62'	Stadium: Comerica Park; Attendance: 36,289; Referee: Chris Penso (United States)
	Penalties
	Bruno Peres (penalty scored); Nainggolan (penalty scored); Gerson (penalty missed); De Rossi (penalty scored)		(penalty scored) Lucas; (penalty scored) Nkunku; (penalty scored) Callegari; (penalty scored) Édouard; (penalty scored) Marquinhos

25 July 2017 ICC	Tottenham Hotspur (England)	2–3	(Italy) Roma	Harrison, United States
20:00 EDT (UTC−04:00)	Carter-Vickers (yellow card) 40'; Winks 87'; Janssen 90+1'	Report	Perotti 13' (pen.); Kolarov (yellow card) 22'; Ünder 70'; Tumminello 90+2'	Stadium: Red Bull Arena; Attendance: 26,192; Referee: Hilario Grajeda (United States)

30 July 2017 ICC	Roma (Italy)	1–1 (4–5 p)	(Italy) Juventus	Foxborough, United States
16:00 EDT (UTC−04:00)	Perotti (yellow card) 40'; Džeko (yellow card) 62', (goal) 74'	Report	Mandžukić 29'; Chiellini (yellow card) 70'	Stadium: Gillette Stadium; Attendance: 33,039; Referee: Jorge Gonzalez (United States)
	Penalties
	Tumminello (penalty missed); Pellegrini (penalty scored); Iturbe (penalty scored); Bruno Peres (penalty scored); Ünder (penalty scored)		(penalty scored) Lichtsteiner; (penalty scored) Barzagli; (penalty scored) Bernardeschi; (penalty scored) Khedira; (penalty scored) Douglas Costa

10 August 2017 Antonio Puerta Trophy	Sevilla (Spain)	2–1	(Italy) Roma	Seville, Spain
22:00 CEST (UTC+02:00)	Correa (yellow card) 25'; Corchia (yellow card) 67'; Escudero 73'; Nolito 90'	Report	Strootman (yellow card) 58'; Džeko (yellow card) 89', (goal) 90+1'	Stadium: Ramón Sánchez Pizjuán; Referee: José Luis Munuera Montero (Spain)

13 August 2017 Friendly	Celta Vigo (Spain)	4–1	(Italy) Roma	Vigo, Spain
19:30 CEST (UTC+02:00)	Aspas 17' (pen.), 41'; Sisto 22', 27'	Report	Strootman 62'	Stadium: Balaídos

1 September 2017 Friendly	Roma (Italy)	4–1	(Brazil) Chapecoense	Rome, Italy
20:45 CEST (UTC+02:00)	Florenzi 29' (pen.); Perotti 38'; Antonucci 42' (pen.), 51'	Report	Ruschel 56' (pen.)	Stadium: Stadio Olimpico

== Competitions ==
=== Serie A ===
==== League table ====
Pos	Team	Pld	W	D	L	GF	GA	GD	Pts	Qualification or relegation
1	Juventus (C)	38	30	5	3	86	24	+62	95	Qualification to Champions League group stage
2	Napoli	38	28	7	3	77	29	+48	91	Qualification to Champions League group stage
3	Roma	38	23	8	7	61	28	+33	77	Qualification to Champions League group stage
4	Internazionale	38	20	12	6	66	30	+36	72	Qualification to Champions League group stage
5	Lazio	38	21	9	8	89	49	+40	71 (Note: Lazio were deducted 1 point by the Italian Football Federation)	Qualification to Europa League group stage (Note: Since the winners of the 2017–18 Coppa Italia, Juventus, qualified for European competition based on league position, the spot awarded to the cup winners (Europa League group stage) was passed to the sixth-placed team and the spot awarded to the sixth-placed team (Europa League second qualifying round) was passed to the seventh-placed team.)

Source: Serie A, Soccerway
Rules for classification: 1) Points; 2) Head-to-head points; 3) Head-to-head goal difference; 4) Goal difference; 5) Goals scored; 6) Draw.
(C) Champions

==== Results summary ====
Overall								Home						Away					
Pld	W	D	L	GF	GA	GD	Pts	W	D	L	GF	GA	GD	W	D	L	GF	GA	GD
38	23	8	7	61	28	+33	77	11	2	6	31	19	+12	12	6	1	30	9	+21

Last updated: 20 May 2018.
Source: Competitive matches

==== Results by round ====
Round	1	2	3	4	5	6	7	8	9	10	11	12	13	14	15	16	17	18	19	20	21	22	23	24	25	26	27	28	29	30	31	32	33	34	35	36	37	38
Ground	A	H	A	H	A	H	A	H	A	H	H	A	H	A	H	A	H	A	H	H	A	H	A	H	A	H	A	H	A	A	H	A	H	A	H	A	H	A
Result	W	L	D	W	W	W	W	L	W	W	W	W	W	D	W	D	W	L	D	L	D	L	W	W	W	L	W	W	W	D	L	D	W	W	W	W	D	W
Position	7	11	10	8	7	5	5	5	5	5	5	5	4	4	4	4	4	4	4	5	5	5	5	4	3	5	3	3	3	3	4	3	3	3	3	3	3	3

Updated to match(es) played on 20 May 2018. Source: Competitive matches
A = Away; H = Home; W = Win; D = Draw; L = Loss

==== Matches ====
20 August 2017 1	Atalanta	0–1	Roma	Bergamo
18:00 CEST (UTC+02:00)	Toloi (yellow card) 69'	Report	Kolarov 31'; Defrel (yellow card) 55'; Nainggolan (yellow card) 90'	Stadium: Stadio Atleti Azzurri d'Italia; Attendance: 19,108; Referee: Piero Giacomelli

26 August 2017 2	Roma	1–3	Internazionale	Rome
20:45 CEST (UTC+02:00)	Džeko 15'; Juan Jesus (yellow card) 22'	Report	Candreva (yellow card) 19'; Icardi 67', 77'; Vecino 87'	Stadium: Stadio Olimpico; Attendance: 49,388; Referee: Massimiliano Irrati

16 September 2017 4	Roma	3–0	Hellas Verona	Rome
20:45 CEST (UTC+02:00)	Nainggolan 22'; Džeko 33', 61'; De Rossi (yellow card) 73'	Report	Souprayen (yellow card) 45+1' (yellow-red card) 66'; Valoti (yellow card) 53'	Stadium: Stadio Olimpico; Attendance: 29,045; Referee: Luca Pairetto

20 September 2017 5	Benevento	0–4	Roma	Benevento
18:30 CEST (UTC+02:00)	Di Chiara (yellow card) 56'; Parigini (yellow card) 84'	Report	Džeko 22', 52'; Lucioni 35' (o.g.); Venuti 74' (o.g.)	Stadium: Stadio Ciro Vigorito; Attendance: 14,839; Referee: Michael Fabbri

23 September 2017 6	Roma	3–1	Udinese	Rome
15:00 CEST (UTC+02:00)	Džeko 12'; El Shaarawy 30', 45'	Report	López (yellow card) 42'; Stryger Larsen 90'	Stadium: Stadio Olimpico; Attendance: 32,457; Referee: Davide Massa

1 October 2017 7	Milan	0–2	Roma	Milan
18:00 CEST (UTC+02:00)	Çalhanoğlu (yellow card) 33' (yellow-red card) 80'; Biglia (yellow card) 62'	Report	Džeko (yellow card) 51', (goal) 72'; Florenzi 77'	Stadium: San Siro; Attendance: 61,698; Referee: Luca Banti

14 October 2017 8	Roma	0–1	Napoli	Rome
20:45 CEST (UTC+02:00)	De Rossi (yellow card) 53'; Fazio (yellow card) 79'	Report	Insigne 20'; Jorginho (yellow card) 43'; Ghoulam (yellow card) 90'	Stadium: Stadio Olimpico; Attendance: 37,914; Referee: Gianluca Rocchi

22 October 2017 9	Torino	0–1	Roma	Turin
15:00 CEST (UTC+02:00)	Niang (yellow card) 64'	Report	Kolarov 69'; Alisson (yellow card) 78'	Stadium: Stadio Olimpico Grande Torino; Attendance: 19,646; Referee: Antonio Damato

25 October 2017 10	Roma	1–0	Crotone	Rome
20:45 CEST (UTC+02:00)	Perotti 10' (pen.)	Report	Budimir (yellow card) 71'	Stadium: Stadio Olimpico; Attendance: 31,605; Referee: Gianluca Manganiello

28 October 2017 11	Roma	1–0	Bologna	Rome
20:45 CEST (UTC+02:00)	El Shaarawy 33'; De Rossi (yellow card) 71'	Report	Poli (yellow card) 48'; Pulgar (yellow card) 50'; Petković (yellow card) 69'; Helander (yellow card) 72'	Stadium: Stadio Olimpico; Attendance: 35,202; Referee: Michael Fabbri

5 November 2017 12	Fiorentina	2–4	Roma	Florence
15:00 CET (UTC+01:00)	Veretout 9'; Simeone 39'; Pezzella (yellow card) 52'	Report	Gerson 5', 30'; Manolas 50'; Gonalons (yellow card) 67'; Perotti 87'	Stadium: Stadio Artemio Franchi; Attendance: 25,026; Referee: Marco Di Bello

18 November 2017 13	Roma	2–1	Lazio	Rome
18:00 CET (UTC+01:00)	Perotti 49' (pen.); Nainggolan 53', (yellow card) 67'; Fazio (yellow card) 87'	Report	Lulić (yellow card) 18'; Lucas (yellow card) 25'; Luis Alberto (yellow card) 55'; Nani (yellow card) 63'; Immobile 72' (pen.)	Stadium: Stadio Olimpico; Attendance: 55,775; Referee: Gianluca Rocchi

26 November 2017 14	Genoa	1–1	Roma	Genoa
15:00 CET (UTC+01:00)	Lapadula 70' (pen.); Taarabt (yellow card) 74'	Report	Fazio (yellow card) 44'; Nainggolan (yellow card) 47'; El Shaarawy 59'; De Rossi (red card) 69'; Juan Jesus (yellow card) 71'	Stadium: Stadio Luigi Ferraris; Attendance: 20,949; Referee: Piero Giacomelli

1 December 2017 15	Roma	3–1	SPAL	Rome
18:30 CET (UTC+01:00)	Džeko 19'; Gonalons (yellow card) 22'; Strootman 32'; Pellegrini 53'	Report	Felipe (red card) 9'; Viviani 55'; Grassi (yellow card) 65'; Schiavon (yellow card) 83'	Stadium: Stadio Olimpico; Attendance: 35,609; Referee: Rosario Abisso

10 December 2017 16	Chievo	0–0	Roma	Verona
12:30 CET (UTC+01:00)	Depaoli (yellow card) 45'	Report	Strootman (yellow card) 40'; Nainggolan (yellow card) 81'	Stadium: Stadio Marc'Antonio Bentegodi; Attendance: 15,000; Referee: Fabio Maresca

16 December 2017 17	Roma	1–0	Cagliari	Rome
20:45 CET (UTC+01:00)	Pellegrini (yellow card) 40'; Fazio 90+4'	Report	João Pedro (yellow card) 27'; Cigarini (yellow card) 44'; Deiola (yellow card) 77'	Stadium: Stadio Olimpico; Attendance: 33,113; Referee: Antonio Damato

23 December 2017 18	Juventus	1–0	Roma	Turin
20:45 CET (UTC+01:00)	Benatia 18'; Cuadrado (yellow card) 52'; Alex Sandro (yellow card) 82'	Report	De Rossi (yellow card) 23'; Pellegrini (yellow card) 87'; Kolarov (yellow card) 90+3'	Stadium: Allianz Stadium; Attendance: 41,100; Referee: Paolo Tagliavento

30 December 2017 19	Roma	1–1	Sassuolo	Rome
15:00 CET (UTC+01:00)	Pellegrini 31'; Džeko (yellow card) 58'	Report	Missiroli 78'; Magnanelli (yellow card) 90+1'; Falcinelli (yellow card) 90+4'	Stadium: Stadio Olimpico; Attendance: 37,157; Referee: Daniele Orsato

6 January 2018 20	Roma	1–2	Atalanta	Rome
18:00 CET (UTC+01:00)	Džeko 56'; Fazio (yellow card) 90+3'	Report	Cornelius 14'; De Roon 19', (yellow card) 28' (yellow-red card) 45'; Caldara (yellow card) 30'	Stadium: Stadio Olimpico; Attendance: 32,863; Referee: Marco Guida

21 January 2018 21	Internazionale	1–1	Roma	Milan
20:45 CET (UTC+01:00)	Perišić (yellow card) 58'; Cancelo (yellow card) 68'; Vecino 86'	Report	El Shaarawy 31'	Stadium: San Siro; Attendance: 57,066; Referee: Davide Massa

24 January 2018 3	Sampdoria	1–1	Roma	Genoa
20:45 CET (UTC+01:00)	Linetty (yellow card) 38'; Quagliarella 45+2' (pen.)	Report	Džeko (yellow card) 15', (goal) 90+1'; Strootman (yellow card) 61'; Florenzi (yellow card) 90+2'	Stadium: Stadio Luigi Ferraris; Attendance: 19,302; Referee: Daniele Orsato
Note: Postponed due to inclement weather; originally scheduled for 9 September 2017.

28 January 2018 22	Roma	0–1	Sampdoria	Rome
20:45 CET (UTC+01:00)	Kolarov (yellow card) 57'; Florenzi (yellow card) 80'	Report	Bereszyński (yellow card) 39'; Zapata 80'; Murru (yellow card) 87'	Stadium: Stadio Olimpico; Attendance: 29,468; Referee: Luca Banti

4 February 2018 23	Hellas Verona	0–1	Roma	Verona
12:30 CET (UTC+01:00)	Caracciolo (yellow card) 21'; Fares (yellow card) 29'; Büchel (yellow card) 48'	Report	Ünder 1'; Nainggolan (yellow card) 24'; Pellegrini (red card) 51'	Stadium: Stadio Marc'Antonio Bentegodi; Attendance: 17,495; Referee: Michael Fabbri

11 February 2018 24	Roma	5–2	Benevento	Rome
20:45 CET (UTC+01:00)	Fazio 26'; Džeko 59'; Ünder 62', 75'; Defrel 90+2' (pen.)	Report	Guilherme 7'; Brignola 76'	Stadium: Stadio Olimpico; Attendance: 31,956; Referee: Gianluca Manganiello

17 February 2018 25	Udinese	0–2	Roma	Udine
15:00 CET (UTC+01:00)	Stryger Larsen (yellow card) 49'; Perica (yellow card) 62'; Jankto (yellow card) 88'	Report	Ünder 70'; Džeko (yellow card) 77'; Perotti 90'	Stadium: Dacia Arena; Attendance: 18,753; Referee: Marco Di Bello

25 February 2018 26	Roma	0–2	Milan	Rome
20:45 CET (UTC+01:00)		Report	Cutrone 48'; Calabria 74'	Stadium: Stadio Olimpico; Attendance: 42,537; Referee: Paolo Mazzoleni

3 March 2018 27	Napoli	2–4	Roma	Naples
20:45 CET (UTC+01:00)	Insigne 6'; Mertens (yellow card) 55', (goal) 90+2'	Report	Ünder 7'; Džeko 26', 73', (yellow card) 86'; Fazio (yellow card) 55'; Perotti 79'	Stadium: Stadio San Paolo; Attendance: 39,310; Referee: Davide Massa

9 March 2018 28	Roma	3–0	Torino	Rome
20:45 CET (UTC+01:00)	De Rossi (yellow card) 8', (goal) 73'; Manolas 56'; Pellegrini 90+3'	Report	Ansaldi (yellow card) 36'; Baselli (yellow card) 87'	Stadium: Stadio Olimpico; Attendance: 33,847; Referee: Fabio Maresca

18 March 2018 29	Crotone	0–2	Roma	Crotone
15:00 CET (UTC+01:00)		Report	El Shaarawy 39'; Nainggolan 75'	Stadium: Stadio Ezio Scida; Attendance: 11,691; Referee: Luca Banti

31 March 2018 30	Bologna	1–1	Roma	Bologna
12:30 CEST (UTC+02:00)	Pulgar 18', (yellow card) 72'; Santurro (yellow card) 36'; Palacio (yellow card) 87'	Report	De Rossi (yellow card) 45+2'; Džeko 76'	Stadium: Stadio Renato Dall'Ara; Attendance: 20,778; Referee: Massimiliano Irrati

7 April 2018 31	Roma	0–2	Fiorentina	Rome
18:00 CEST (UTC+02:00)	Džeko (yellow card) 58'; El Shaarawy (yellow card) 75'; Juan Jesus (yellow card) 85'; Bruno Peres (yellow card) 90+1'	Report	Benassi 7'; Vitor Hugo (yellow card) 14'; Simeone 39'; Laurini (yellow card) 43'	Stadium: Stadio Olimpico; Attendance: 41,728; Referee: Michael Fabbri

15 April 2018 32	Lazio	0–0	Roma	Rome
20:45 CEST (UTC+02:00)	Lucas (yellow card) 11'; Luiz Felipe (yellow card) 36'; Radu (yellow card) 39' (yellow-red card) 80'	Report	Juan Jesus (yellow card) 31'; Strootman (yellow card) 62'	Stadium: Stadio Olimpico; Attendance: 55,000; Referee: Paolo Mazzoleni

18 April 2018 33	Roma	2–1	Genoa	Rome
20:45 CEST (UTC+02:00)	Ünder 17'; Zukanović 52' (o.g.)	Report	Rossettini (yellow card) 16'; Lapadula 61'	Stadium: Stadio Olimpico; Attendance: 30,095; Referee: Luca Pairetto

21 April 2018 34	SPAL	0–3	Roma	Ferrara
15:00 CEST (UTC+02:00)	Vicari (yellow card) 5'; Everton Luiz (yellow card) 12'; Schiattarella (yellow card) 40'; Grassi (yellow card) 90'	Report	Strootman (yellow card) 9'; Vicari 33' (o.g.); Nainggolan 52'; Schick 59'	Stadium: Stadio Paolo Mazza; Attendance: 12,355; Referee: Paolo Tagliavento

28 April 2018 35	Roma	4–1	Chievo	Rome
18:00 CEST (UTC+02:00)	Schick 9'; Kolarov (yellow card) 24'; Džeko 40', 67'; Juan Jesus (red card) 56'; El Shaarawy 65'; Nainggolan (yellow card) 90+2'	Report	Hetemaj (yellow card) 28'; Inglese 88'; Birsa (yellow card) 90+1'	Stadium: Stadio Olimpico; Attendance: 38,694; Referee: Gianpaolo Calvarese

6 May 2018 36	Cagliari	0–1	Roma	Cagliari
20:45 CEST (UTC+02:00)	Lykogiannis (yellow card) 23'; Barella (yellow card) 38'; Ioniță (yellow card) 73'; Ceppitelli (yellow card) 88'	Report	Ünder 15'; Gerson (yellow card) 88'	Stadium: Sardegna Arena; Attendance: 15,157; Referee: Marco Di Bello

13 May 2018 37	Roma	0–0	Juventus	Rome
20:45 CEST (UTC+02:00)	Nainggolan (yellow card) 63' (yellow-red card) 68'	Report	Pjanić (yellow card) 32'; Alex Sandro (yellow card) 43'	Stadium: Stadio Olimpico; Attendance: 53,091; Referee: Paolo Tagliavento

20 May 2018 38	Sassuolo	0–1	Roma	Reggio Emilia
20:45 CEST (UTC+02:00)	Biondini (yellow card) 90+1'	Report	Fazio (yellow card) 35'; Pegolo 45+1' (o.g.)	Stadium: Mapei Stadium – Città del Tricolore; Attendance: 13,129; Referee: Eugenio Abbattista

=== Coppa Italia ===
20 December 2017 Round of 16	Roma	1–2	Torino	Rome
17:30 CET (UTC+01:00)	Gonalons (yellow card) 57'; Schick 85'	Report	Niang (yellow card) 28'; De Silvestri 39'; Edera 73'; Moretti (yellow card) 77'	Stadium: Stadio Olimpico; Attendance: 27,206; Referee: Gianpaolo Calvarese

=== UEFA Champions League ===
==== Group stage ====
Pos	Team	Pld	W	D	L	GF	GA	GD	Pts	Qualification	ROM	CHE	ATM	QRB
1	(Italy) Roma	6	3	2	1	9	6	+3	11 (Note: Head-to-head results: Chelsea 3–3 Roma, Roma 3–0 Chelsea.)	Advance to knockout phase	—	3–0	0–0	1–0
2	(England) Chelsea	6	3	2	1	16	8	+8	11	Advance to knockout phase	3–3	—	1–1	6–0
3	(Spain) Atlético Madrid	6	1	4	1	5	4	+1	7	Transfer to Europa League	2–0	1–2	—	1–1
4	(Azerbaijan) Qarabağ	6	0	2	4	2	14	−12	2		1–2	0–4	0–0	—

Source: UEFA
Rules for classification: Group stage tiebreakers
Notes:

12 September 2017 1	Roma (Italy)	0–0	(Spain) Atlético Madrid	Rome, Italy
20:45 CEST (UTC+02:00)	Perotti (yellow card) 71'	Report		Stadium: Stadio Olimpico; Attendance: 36,064; Referee: Milorad Mažić (Serbia)

27 September 2017 2	Qarabağ (Azerbaijan)	1–2	(Italy) Roma	Baku, Azerbaijan
18:00 CEST (UTC+02:00)	Pedro Henrique 28', (yellow card) 41'; Garayev (yellow card) 39'	Report	Manolas 7'; Džeko 15'; Gonalons (yellow card) 43'	Stadium: Tofiq Bahramov Republican Stadium; Attendance: 67,200; Referee: Artur Soares Dias (Portugal)

18 October 2017 3	Chelsea (England)	3–3	(Italy) Roma	London, England
20:45 CEST (UTC+02:00)	David Luiz 11'; Hazard 37', 75'; Bakayoko (yellow card) 69'	Report	Kolarov 40'; Džeko 64', 70'	Stadium: Stamford Bridge; Attendance: 41,105; Referee: Damir Skomina (Slovenia)

31 October 2017 4	Roma (Italy)	3–0	(England) Chelsea	Rome, Italy
20:45 CET (UTC+01:00)	El Shaarawy 1', 36'; Perotti 63'	Report		Stadium: Stadio Olimpico; Attendance: 55,036; Referee: Jonas Eriksson (Sweden)

22 November 2017 5	Atlético Madrid (Spain)	2–0	(Italy) Roma	Madrid, Spain
20:45 CET (UTC+01:00)	Filipe Luís (yellow card) 61'; Griezmann 69'; Gameiro 85'	Report	Manolas (yellow card) 7'; Bruno Peres (yellow card) 63' (yellow-red card) 83'	Stadium: Wanda Metropolitano; Attendance: 56,253; Referee: Björn Kuipers (Netherlands)

5 December 2017 6	Roma (Italy)	1–0	(Azerbaijan) Qarabağ	Rome, Italy
20:45 CET (UTC+01:00)	Perotti 53'; Džeko (yellow card) 61'	Report	Guerrier (yellow card) 42'; Míchel (yellow card) 57'; Yunuszade (yellow card) 61'; Rzeźniczak (yellow card) 88'	Stadium: Stadio Olimpico; Attendance: 34,258; Referee: Tobias Stieler (Germany)

==== Knockout phase ====
===== Round of 16 =====
21 February 2018 First leg	Shakhtar Donetsk (Ukraine)	2–1	(Italy) Roma	Kharkiv, Ukraine
20:45 CET (UTC+01:00)	Ferreyra 52', (yellow card) 80'; Fred 71'; Taison (yellow card) 90+1'	Report	Ünder 41'; Perotti (yellow card) 90+1'	Stadium: Metalist Stadium (Note: Shakhtar Donetsk played their home match at Metalist Stadium, Kharkiv, instead of their regular stadium, Donbas Arena in Donetsk, due to the war in Donbas.); Attendance: 35,124; Referee: Willie Collum (Scotland)

13 March 2018 Second leg	Roma (Italy)	1–0 (2 (a) –2 agg.)	(Ukraine) Shakhtar Donetsk	Rome, Italy
20:45 CET (UTC+01:00)	Florenzi (yellow card) 39'; Džeko 52'; Manolas (yellow card) 54'	Report	Stepanenko (yellow card) 71'; Fred (yellow card) 76'; Ordets (red card) 79'; Ferreyra (yellow card) 80'	Stadium: Stadio Olimpico; Attendance: 47,693; Referee: Alberto Undiano Mallenco (Spain)

===== Quarter-finals =====
4 April 2018 First leg	Barcelona (Spain)	4–1	(Italy) Roma	Barcelona, Spain
20:45 CEST (UTC+02:00)	De Rossi 38' (o.g.); Manolas 55' (o.g.); Piqué 59'; L. Suárez 87'	Report	Kolarov (yellow card) 44'; Džeko 80'; Strootman (yellow card) 86'	Stadium: Camp Nou; Attendance: 90,106; Referee: Danny Makkelie (Netherlands)

10 April 2018 Second leg	Roma (Italy)	3–0 (4 (a) –4 agg.)	(Spain) Barcelona	Rome, Italy
20:45 CEST (UTC+02:00)	Džeko 6'; Fazio (yellow card) 38'; Juan Jesus (yellow card) 44'; De Rossi 58' (pen.); Manolas 82'	Report	Piqué (yellow card) 57'; Messi (yellow card) 63'; L. Suárez (yellow card) 72'	Stadium: Stadio Olimpico; Attendance: 56,580; Referee: Clément Turpin (France)

===== Semi-finals =====
24 April 2018 First leg	Liverpool (England)	5–2	(Italy) Roma	Liverpool, England
20:45 CEST (UTC+02:00)	Salah 36', 45+1'; Alexander-Arnold (yellow card) 39'; Mané 56'; Firmino 61', 69'; Lovren (yellow card) 74'; Milner (yellow card) 85'	Report	Juan Jesus (yellow card) 26'; Džeko 81'; Perotti 85' (pen.); Fazio (yellow card) 88'	Stadium: Anfield; Attendance: 51,236; Referee: Felix Brych (Germany)

2 May 2018 Second leg	Roma (Italy)	4–2 (6–7 agg.)	(England) Liverpool	Rome, Italy
20:45 CEST (UTC+02:00)	Milner 15' (o.g.); Džeko 52'; Florenzi (yellow card) 76'; Manolas (yellow card) 84'; Nainggolan 86', 90+4' (pen.)	Report	Mané 9'; Wijnaldum 25'; Lovren (yellow card) 44'; Robertson (yellow card) 84'; Solanke (yellow card) 90'	Stadium: Stadio Olimpico; Attendance: 61,889; Referee: Damir Skomina (Slovenia)

== Statistics ==
=== Appearances and goals ===
No.	Pos	Nat	Player	Total		Serie A		Coppa Italia		Champions League	
No.	Pos	Nat	Player	Apps	Goals	Apps	Goals	Apps	Goals	Apps	Goals
Goalkeepers
1	GK	(Brazil) BRA	Alisson	49	0	37	0	0	0	12	0
18	GK	(Romania) ROU	Bogdan Lobonț	0	0	0	0	0	0	0	0
28	GK	(Poland) POL	Łukasz Skorupski	2	0	1	0	1	0	0	0
Defenders
5	DF	(Brazil) BRA	Juan Jesus	29	0	18+4	0	1	0	6	0
11	DF	(Serbia) SRB	Aleksandar Kolarov	47	3	34+1	2	0	0	12	1
13	DF	(Italy) ITA	Elio Capradossi	2	0	1+1	0	0	0	0	0
20	DF	(Argentina) ARG	Federico Fazio	45	2	32+2	2	0	0	10+1	0
25	DF	(Brazil) BRA	Bruno Peres	25	0	13+5	0	1	0	5+1	0
26	DF	(Netherlands) NED	Rick Karsdorp	1	0	1	0	0	0	0	0
33	DF	(Argentina) ARG	Jonathan Silva	2	0	1+1	0	0	0	0	0
44	DF	(Greece) GRE	Kostas Manolas	40	4	27+2	2	0	0	10+1	2
Midfielders
4	MF	(Belgium) BEL	Radja Nainggolan	42	6	31	4	0	0	11	2
6	MF	(Netherlands) NED	Kevin Strootman	44	1	26+6	1	1	0	9+2	0
7	MF	(Italy) ITA	Lorenzo Pellegrini	37	3	22+6	3	0+1	0	4+4	0
16	MF	(Italy) ITA	Daniele De Rossi	32	2	21+1	1	0	0	9+1	1
21	MF	(France) FRA	Maxime Gonalons	23	0	12+4	0	1	0	3+3	0
24	MF	(Italy) ITA	Alessandro Florenzi	42	1	26+6	1	0	0	8+2	0
30	MF	(Brazil) BRA	Gerson	31	2	8+16	2	1	0	2+4	0
Forwards
8	FW	(Argentina) ARG	Diego Perotti	35	8	17+8	5	0+1	0	8+1	3
9	FW	(Bosnia and Herzegovina) BIH	Edin Džeko	49	23	33+3	16	0+1	0	12	7
14	FW	(Czech Republic) CZE	Patrik Schick	26	3	10+12	2	1	1	2+1	0
17	FW	(Turkey) TUR	Cengiz Ünder	32	8	15+11	7	1	0	3+2	1
23	FW	(France) FRA	Grégoire Defrel	20	1	5+10	1	0	0	2+3	0
48	FW	(Italy) ITA	Mirko Antonucci	3	0	0+2	0	0	0	0+1	0
92	FW	(Italy) ITA	Stephan El Shaarawy	44	9	25+8	7	1	0	4+6	2
Players transferred out during the season
15	DF	(Mexico) MEX	Héctor Moreno	6	0	2+3	0	1	0	0	0
32	FW	(Italy) ITA	Marco Tumminello	1	0	0+1	0	0	0	0	0
33	DF	(Italy) ITA	Emerson	2	0	0+1	0	1	0	0	0

Last updated: 20 May 2018
Source: Competitions

=== Goalscorers ===
Rank	No.	Pos	Nat	Name	Serie A	Coppa Italia	UEFA CL	Total
1	9	FW	(Bosnia and Herzegovina)	Edin Džeko	16	0	8	24
2	92	FW	(Italy)	Stephan El Shaarawy	7	0	2	9
3	8	FW	(Argentina)	Diego Perotti	5	0	3	8
3	17	FW	(Turkey)	Cengiz Ünder	7	0	1	8
5	4	MF	(Belgium)	Radja Nainggolan	4	0	2	6
6	44	DF	(Greece)	Kostas Manolas	2	0	2	4
7	7	MF	(Italy)	Lorenzo Pellegrini	3	0	0	3
7	11	DF	(Serbia)	Aleksandar Kolarov	2	0	1	3
7	14	FW	(Czech Republic)	Patrik Schick	2	1	0	3
10	16	MF	(Italy)	Daniele De Rossi	1	0	1	2
10	20	DF	(Argentina)	Federico Fazio	2	0	0	2
10	30	MF	(Brazil)	Gerson	2	0	0	2
13	6	MF	(Netherlands)	Kevin Strootman	1	0	0	1
13	23	FW	(France)	Grégoire Defrel	1	0	0	1
13	24	MF	(Italy)	Alessandro Florenzi	1	0	0	1
Own goal					5	0	1	6
Totals					61	1	21	83

Last updated: 20 May 2018

=== Clean sheets ===
Rank	No.	Pos	Nat	Name	Serie A	Coppa Italia	UEFA CL	Total
1	1	GK	(Brazil)	Alisson	17	0	5	22
2	28	GK	(Poland)	Łukasz Skorupski	1	0	0	1
Totals					18	0	5	23

Last updated: 20 May 2018

=== Disciplinary record ===
No.	Pos	Nat	Name	Serie A			Coppa Italia			UEFA CL			Total		
No.	Pos	Nat	Name	Booked	(yellow card) (yellow-red card)	Sent off (straight red)	Booked	(yellow card) (yellow-red card)	Sent off (straight red)	Booked	(yellow card) (yellow-red card)	Sent off (straight red)	Booked	(yellow card) (yellow-red card)	Sent off (straight red)
1	GK	(Brazil)	Alisson	1	0	0	0	0	0	0	0	0	1	0	0
18	GK	(Romania)	Bogdan Lobonț	0	0	0	0	0	0	0	0	0	0	0	0
28	GK	(Poland)	Łukasz Skorupski	0	0	0	0	0	0	0	0	0	0	0	0
5	DF	(Brazil)	Juan Jesus	4	0	1	0	0	0	2	0	0	6	0	1
11	DF	(Serbia)	Aleksandar Kolarov	2	0	0	0	0	0	1	0	0	3	0	0
15	DF	(Mexico)	Héctor Moreno	0	0	0	0	0	0	0	0	0	0	0	0
20	DF	(Argentina)	Federico Fazio	6	0	0	0	0	0	2	0	0	8	0	0
25	DF	(Brazil)	Bruno Peres	1	0	0	0	0	0	0	1	0	1	1	0
26	DF	(Netherlands)	Rick Karsdorp	0	0	0	0	0	0	0	0	0	0	0	0
33	DF	(Italy)	Emerson	0	0	0	0	0	0	0	0	0	0	0	0
44	DF	(Greece)	Kostas Manolas	0	0	0	0	0	0	3	0	0	3	0	0
4	MF	(Belgium)	Radja Nainggolan	6	1	0	0	0	0	0	0	0	6	1	0
6	MF	(Netherlands)	Kevin Strootman	4	0	0	0	0	0	1	0	0	5	0	0
7	MF	(Italy)	Lorenzo Pellegrini	2	0	1	0	0	0	0	0	0	2	0	1
16	MF	(Italy)	Daniele De Rossi	6	0	1	0	0	0	0	0	0	6	0	1
21	MF	(France)	Maxime Gonalons	2	0	0	1	0	0	1	0	0	4	0	0
24	MF	(Italy)	Alessandro Florenzi	1	0	0	0	0	0	2	0	0	3	0	0
30	MF	(Brazil)	Gerson	1	0	0	0	0	0	0	0	0	1	0	0
8	FW	(Argentina)	Diego Perotti	0	0	0	0	0	0	2	0	0	2	0	0
9	FW	(Bosnia and Herzegovina)	Edin Džeko	6	0	0	0	0	0	1	0	0	7	0	0
14	FW	(Czech Republic)	Patrik Schick	0	0	0	0	0	0	0	0	0	0	0	0
17	FW	(Turkey)	Cengiz Ünder	0	0	0	0	0	0	0	0	0	0	0	0
23	FW	(France)	Grégoire Defrel	1	0	0	0	0	0	0	0	0	1	0	0
92	FW	(Italy)	Stephan El Shaarawy	1	0	0	0	0	0	0	0	0	1	0	0
Totals				44	1	3	1	0	0	15	1	0	60	2	3

Last updated: 20 May 2018
