= Lorenzo Crisanto =

Italian footballer (born 1998)

Personal information
- Date of birth: 20 April 1998 (age 28)
- Place of birth: Prato, Italy
- Height: 1.80 m (5 ft 11 in)
- Position: Goalkeeper

Youth career
- –2017: Roma

Senior career*
Years	Team	Apps	(Gls)
2016–2019	Roma	0	(0)
2017–2018	→ Robur Siena (loan)	1	(0)
2018–2019	→ Pistoiese (loan)	2	(0)
2019	→ Monopoli (loan)	1	(0)
2019–2022	Alessandria	8	(0)
- * Club domestic league appearances and goals as of 6 May 2022

Lorenzo Crisanto (born 20 April 1998) is an Italian football player.

== Club career ==
He made several appearances on the bench for Roma in the 2016–17 season and was the first-choice goalkeeper for Roma's squad in the 2015–16 UEFA Youth League and 2016–17 UEFA Youth League.

He made his Serie C debut for Robur Siena on 5 May 2018 in a game against Prato.

On 17 January 2019, Crisanto joined to Monopoli on loan until 30 June 2019.

On 14 August 2019, he signed with Alessandria.
