= Emerson Palmieri =

Italy international footballer (born 1994)

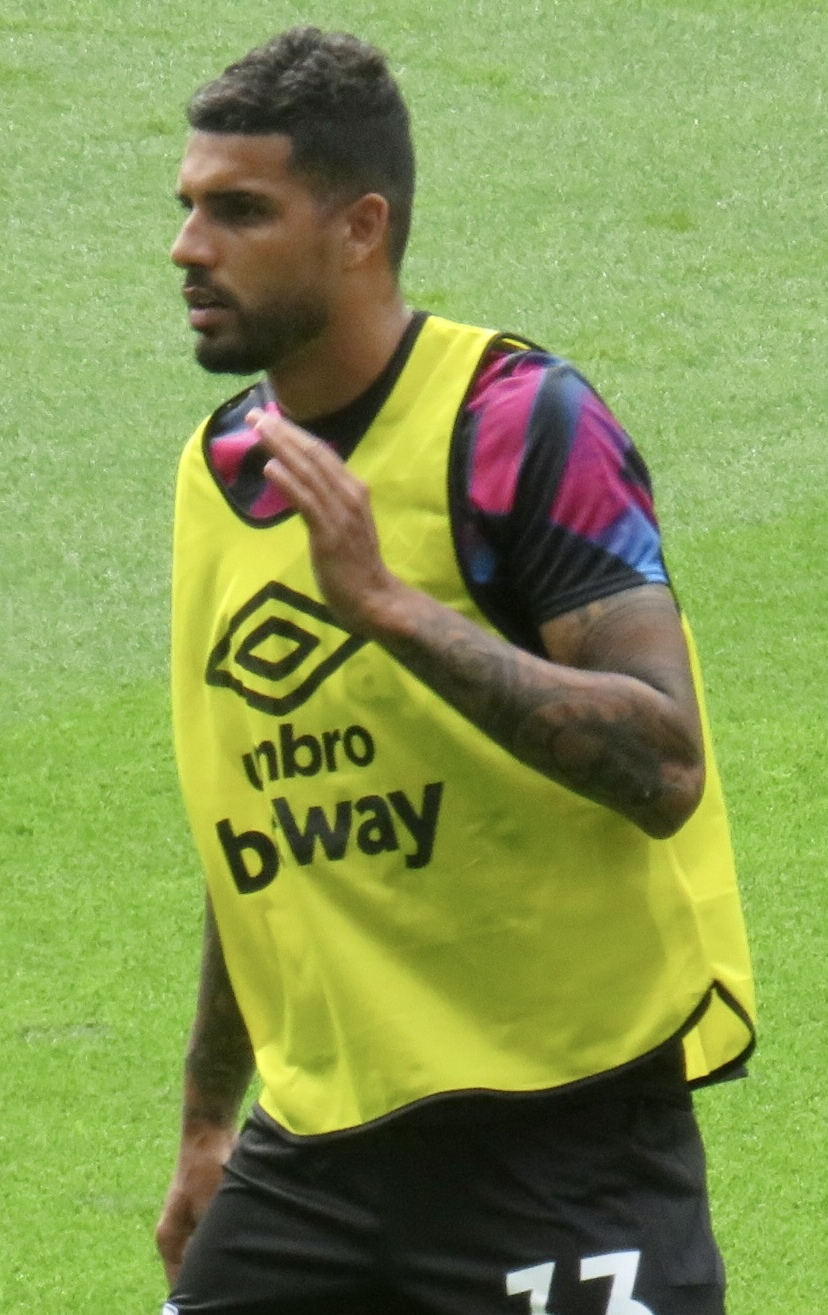
- Emerson with West Ham United in 2022

Personal information
- Full name: Emerson Palmieri dos Santos
- Date of birth: 3 August 1994 (age 32)
- Place of birth: Santos, São Paulo, Brazil
- Height: 1.76 m (5 ft 9 in)
- Position: Left-back

Team information
- Current team: Marseille
- Number: 33

Youth career
- 2009–2011: Santos

Senior career*
Years	Team	Apps	(Gls)
2011–2015	Santos	30	(3)
2014–2015	→ Palermo (loan)	9	(0)
2015–2018	Roma	34	(1)
2018–2022	Chelsea	33	(0)
2021–2022	→ Lyon (loan)	29	(1)
2022–2025	West Ham United	89	(4)
2025–	Marseille	37	(0)

International career
2011	Brazil U17	15	(0)
2018–2023	Italy	29	(0)
Medal record
Men's Football
Representing Italy
UEFA European Championship
Winner	2020 Europe
UEFA Nations League
Third place	2021 Italy
CONMEBOL–UEFA Cup of Champions
Runner-up	2022 England
- * Club domestic league appearances and goals as of 21:21, 1 November 2026 (UTC)

Emerson Palmieri dos Santos Cavaliere OMRI (born 3 August 1994), known as Emerson Palmieri or simply Emerson, is a professional footballer who plays as a left-back for Ligue 1 club Marseille. Born in Brazil, he played for the Italy national team.

Emerson began his career at his hometown club Santos, moving to Serie A club Roma in 2015, having spent a season on loan at Palermo. In 2018, he was signed by Premier League club Chelsea, where he won the UEFA Europa League, the UEFA Champions League and the UEFA Super Cup.

After a season on loan with French side Lyon, he transferred across London to West Ham United in 2022, where he became the first player to have won all four European Continental competitions after winning the UEFA Europa Conference League in his first season.

Internationally, Emerson played for his native Brazil at under-17 level, but he later declared his desire to represent Italy, having been granted Italian citizenship in 2017. He has since represented the Italy national team, making his senior international debut with the side in 2018 and later taking part in UEFA Euro 2020, winning the tournament.

== Club career ==
=== Santos ===
Born in Santos, São Paulo, Emerson played in Santos' youth team making his first team debut on 17 April 2011, coming on as a late substitute for Keirrison in a 3–0 Campeonato Paulista home win against Paulista.

His first start occurred on 21 January 2012, in a 1–1 away draw against XV de Piracicaba. In February, he returned to the youth team, but he was called up to the match against Mogi Mirim in the following month. He also appeared against Ituano and Paulista, as the club was crowned champions of Paulistão for the third consecutive time. On 17 June, Emerson made his Série A debut, in a 0–1 defeat against Flamengo. He scored his first goal on 5 September 2013, but in a 1–2 loss at Atlético Paranaense.

==== Palermo (loan) ====
On 25 August 2014, Emerson was loaned to Serie A's Palermo, with a buyout clause. He made his debut in the competition on 24 September, coming on as a second half substitute for Fabio Daprelà in a 3–3 away draw against Napoli. Emerson played nine league matches for the club, being mainly a backup to another new signing, Achraf Lazaar.

=== Roma ===
On 31 August 2015, Emerson joined fellow league team Roma on a one-year loan. A second-choice behind Lucas Digne, he made his debut for the club on 4 October in a 4–2 away win against former side Palermo. Emerson scored his first goal in the top league of Italian football on 14 May 2016, in a 3–1 away win against Milan; after replacing Stephan El Shaarawy in the 78th minute, he netted his team's third after a rebound. His loan was extended for a further season on 7 July. On 5 December 2016, after reaching 12 matches during the campaign, Emerson was bought outright for a reported fee of €2 million. Emerson missed much of the first half of the 2017–18 season due to an anterior cruciate ligament injury that he suffered in May 2017. He made his comeback on 1 December 2017, coming off the bench in the last 15 minutes of the match against SPAL for the Serie A, which turned out as his sole appearance for Roma during that season.

=== Chelsea ===
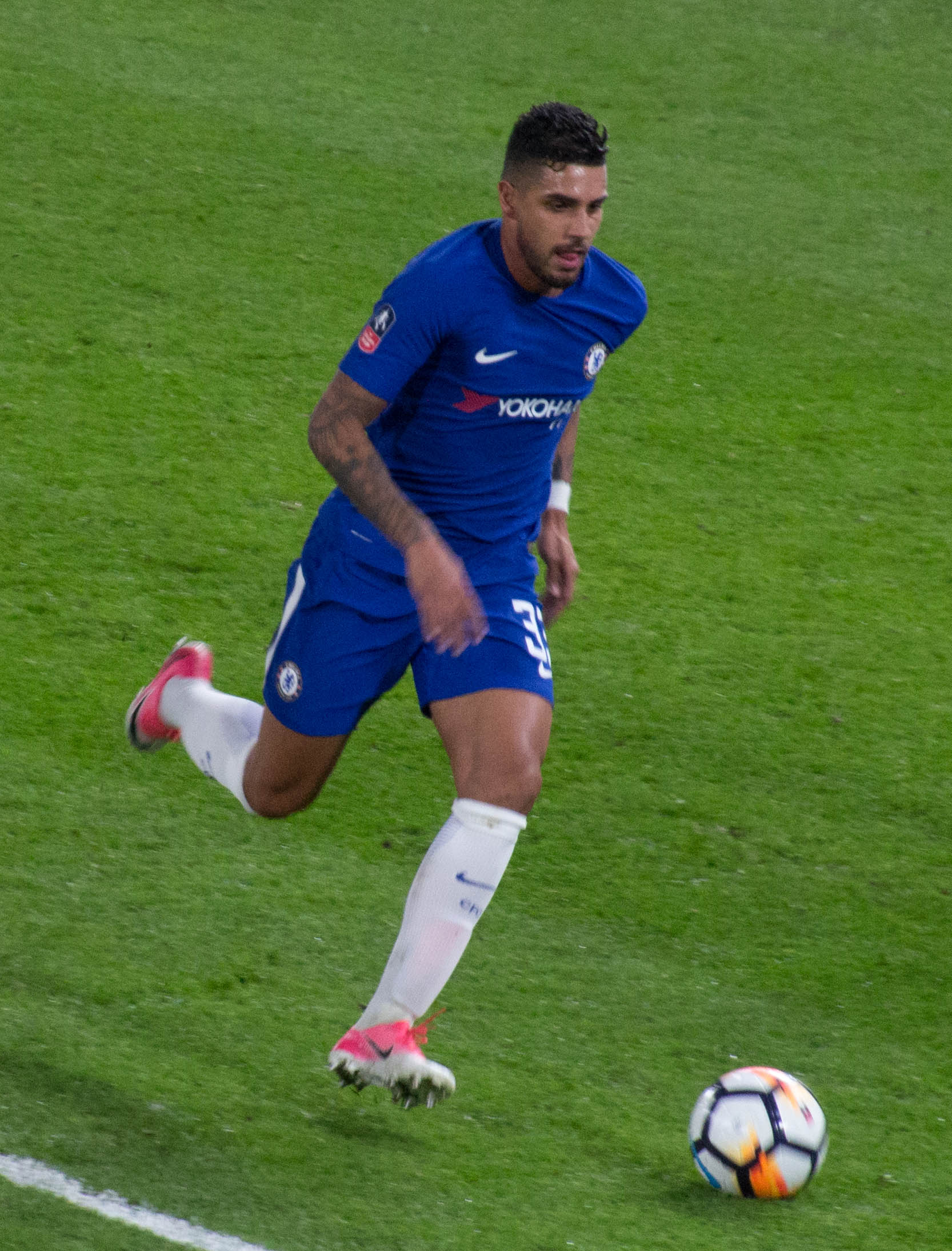
Emerson playing for Chelsea in 2018

On 30 January 2018, Emerson joined English side Chelsea on a four-and-a-half-year deal for an undisclosed fee. According to Roma, the transfer fee was €20 million plus €9 million bonus. He made his debut against Hull City in the fifth round of the FA Cup, assisting fellow January signing Olivier Giroud for his first Chelsea goal. The Blues came out 4–0 winners at Stamford Bridge.

Emerson made his Premier League debut on 4 March 2018 as a second-half substitute in a 1–0 defeat at Manchester City. His first Premier League start came away to Burnley on 19 April. Emerson set up Victor Moses for the winning goal as Chelsea claimed a 2–1 victory. Chelsea went on to win the 2017–18 FA Cup but Emerson was injured and missed the final.

On 26 September 2018, in his first appearance of the 2018–19 season, Emerson scored his first goal for Chelsea, the equaliser in an eventual 2–1 away win against Liverpool, in the third round of the EFL Cup. On 24 February 2019, he started for Chelsea in the 2019 EFL Cup Final on, and was one of the three Chelsea players to convert their spot kicks in the resulting shoot-out following a 0–0 draw after extra-time; however, Manchester City ultimately prevailed 4–3. On 29 May, he assisted Olivier Giroud's opening goal in a 4–1 win over Arsenal in the 2019 UEFA Europa League Final. On 17 March 2021, Emerson scored his first UEFA Champions League goal for the Blues in a 2–0 home win over Atlético Madrid in the second leg of the Round of 16 tie. Emerson was part of the Chelsea squad which won the 2021 UEFA Champions League Final 1–0 against Manchester City, however did not come off the bench in the match.

==== Lyon (loan) ====
On 19 August 2021, Emerson joined Ligue 1 side Lyon on a one-year loan.

=== West Ham United ===
On 23 August 2022, Emerson joined Premier League side West Ham United on a four-year contract with a one-year option for an undisclosed fee from fellow Premier League club Chelsea. He made his debut on 28 August in a 1–0 away win against Aston Villa playing the first half as a wing-back before being replaced at half-time by Saïd Benrahma. His first goal for West Ham came on 11 February 2023, in a 1–1 draw at the London Stadium against his former club Chelsea. Bundling in a cross from Jarrod Bowen, Emerson's goal equalised an early opening goal for Chelsea's João Félix.

On 7 June 2023, Emerson became the first ever player to win each of the four modern UEFA club competitions (Champions League, Europa League, Europa Conference League, Super Cup) as well as the UEFA European Championship, playing all 90 minutes as West Ham defeated Fiorentina in the 2023 UEFA Europa Conference League final. He played 113 games for West Ham before being transferred in September 2025.

=== Marseille ===
On 1 September 2025, Emerson joined French Ligue 1 club, Marseille for a fee of €700,000, plus an extra €300,000 in bonuses.

== International career ==
Emerson represented Brazil at under-17 level during the 2011 South American U-17 Championship and during the 2011 FIFA U-17 World Cup, being crowned champions of the former. He was an undisputed starter during both tournaments, scoring a goal against Chile on 16 March 2011.

In March 2017, after being close to acquiring Italian citizenship, Emerson was reportedly pursued by Italy head coach Gian Piero Ventura with the intention of switching his international allegiance to Italy. He officially switched allegiance to Italy on 29 March 2017. Emerson was called up by Ventura for matches against Uruguay and Liechtenstein in June 2017, however, withdrew due to injury and replaced by Andrea Conti.

On 19 May 2018, new Italy coach Roberto Mancini called Emerson for Italy's May and June friendly matches against Saudi Arabia, France and the Netherlands, however, he withdrew due to another injury. He was later called up again to the team in September 2018, for Italy's opening UEFA Nations League matches against Poland and Portugal later that month. He made his senior international debut for Italy on 10 September, during the UEFA Nations League match against Portugal, coming on as a second-half substitute for Domenico Criscito in his team's 1–0 away loss.

In June 2021, Emerson was included in Italy's squad for UEFA Euro 2020. On 11 July, Emerson won the European Championship with Italy following a 3–2 penalty shoot-out victory over England at Wembley Stadium in the final, after a 1–1 draw in extra-time; Emerson started the final, and was substituted for Alessandro Florenzi in extra-time.

== Style of play ==
Emerson usually plays as a left-back and is known for his stamina, athleticism, physical qualities, and technique, which make him an effective offensive asset. He is also known for his ability to get past opponents and provide crosses into the penalty box. A versatile player, he is also capable of playing as a wing-back or wide midfielder on the left flank, and has even been used in a more advanced role as an offensive winger on occasion. Emerson's Chelsea profile notes that he is "skilful, possesses a good range of passing and reads the game well".

== Personal life ==
Emerson has Italian ancestry on his mother's side from Rossano, near Cosenza in Calabria, and has been an Italian citizen since March 2017. His older brother, Giovanni, is also a footballer and a left back.

== Career statistics ==
=== Club ===
As of match played 1 November 2026

Appearances and goals by club, season and competition
Club	Season	League			State league (Note: Includes Campeonato Paulista)		National cup (Note: Includes Copa do Brasil, Coppa Italia, FA Cup, Coupe de France)		League cup (Note: Includes EFL Cup)		Continental		Other		Total	
Club	Season	Division	Apps	Goals	Apps	Goals	Apps	Goals	Apps	Goals	Apps	Goals	Apps	Goals	Apps	Goals
Santos	2011	Série A	0	0	1	0	—		—		—		—		1	0
Santos	2012	Série A	1	0	3	0	—		—		—		—		4	0
Santos	2013	Série A	14	1	2	0	1	0	—		—		—		17	1
Santos	2014	Série A	3	0	6	2	2	0	—		—		—		11	2
Santos	Total		18	1	12	2	3	0	—		—		—		33	3
Palermo (loan)	2014–15	Serie A	9	0	—		0	0	—		—		—		9	0
Roma	2015–16	Serie A	8	1	—		1	0	—		0	0	—		9	1
Roma	2016–17	Serie A	25	0	—		4	0	—		7 (Note: Two appearances in UEFA Champions League, five appearances and one goal in UEFA Europa League)	1	—		36	1
Roma	2017–18	Serie A	1	0	—		1	0	—		—		—		2	0
Roma	Total		34	1	—		6	0	—		7	1	—		47	2
Chelsea	2017–18	Premier League	5	0	—		2	0	—		0	0	—		7	0
Chelsea	2018–19	Premier League	10	0	—		1	0	5	1	11 (Note: Appearances in UEFA Europa League)	0	—		27	1
Chelsea	2019–20	Premier League	15	0	—		2	0	0	0	3 (Note: Appearances in UEFA Champions League)	0	1 (Note: Appearance in UEFA Super Cup)	0	21	0
Chelsea	2020–21	Premier League	2	0	—		5	0	2	0	6	1	—		15	1
Chelsea	2021–22	Premier League	1	0	—		—		—		—		0	0	1	0
Chelsea	Total		33	0	—		10	0	7	1	20	1	1	0	71	2
Lyon (loan)	2021–22	Ligue 1	29	1	—		0	0	—		7	0	—		36	1
West Ham United	2022–23	Premier League	22	1	—		3	0	1	0	8 (Note: Appearances in UEFA Europa Conference League)	1	—		34	2
West Ham United	2023–24	Premier League	36	1	—		2	0	1	0	8	0	—		47	1
West Ham United	2024–25	Premier League	31	2	—		0	0	1	0	—		—		32	2
West Ham United	Total		89	4	—		5	0	3	0	16	1	—		113	5
Marseille	2025–26	Ligue 1	28	0	—		3	0	—		5	0	1 (Note: Appearance in Trophée des Champions)	0	37	0
Marseille	2026–27	Ligue 1	9	0	—		0	0	—		2	0	—		11	0
Marseille	Total		37	0	—		3	0	—		7	0	1	0	48	2
Career total			249	7	12	2	27	0	10	1	57	3	2	0	357	13

=== International ===
As of match played 26 March 2023

Appearances and goals by national team and year
National team	Year	Apps	Goals
Italy	2018	2	0
Italy	2019	5	0
Italy	2020	5	0
Italy	2021	13	0
Italy	2022	3	0
Italy	2023	1	0
Total		29	0

== Honours ==
Santos

- Campeonato Paulista: 2011, 2012

Chelsea

- UEFA Champions League: 2020–21
- UEFA Europa League: 2018–19
- UEFA Super Cup: 2021
- FA Cup runner-up: 2019–20, 2020–21
- EFL Cup runner-up: 2018–19

West Ham United

- UEFA Europa Conference League: 2022–23

Brazil U17

- South American U-17 Championship: 2011

Italy

- UEFA European Championship: 2020
- UEFA Nations League third place: 2020–21

Orders

- 5th Class / Knight: Cavaliere Ordine al Merito della Repubblica Italiana: 2021
