= Radja Nainggolan =

Belgian footballer (born 1988)

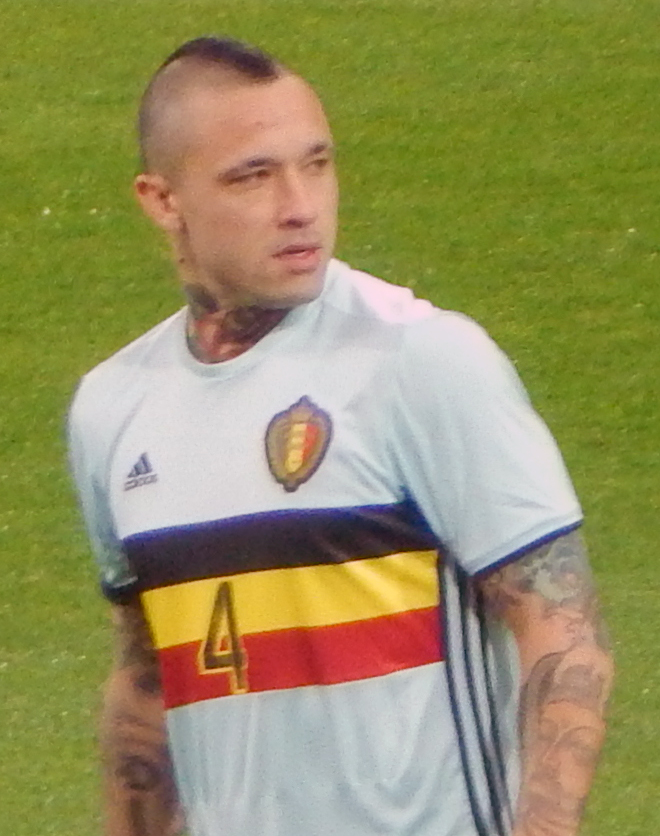
- Nainggolan with Belgium in 2017

Personal information
- Full name: Radja Nainggolan
- Date of birth: 4 May 1988 (age 38)
- Place of birth: Antwerp, Belgium
- Height: 1.76 m (5 ft 9 in)
- Position: Central midfielder

Team information
- Current team: Patro Eisden
- Number: 4

Youth career
- 1993–2000: Tubantia Borgerhout
- 2000–2005: Germinal Beerschot
- 2005–2007: Piacenza

Senior career*
Years	Team	Apps	(Gls)
2006–2010	Piacenza	71	(4)
2010	→ Cagliari (loan)	7	(0)
2010–2014	Cagliari	124	(7)
2014	→ Roma (loan)	17	(2)
2014–2018	Roma	138	(26)
2018–2021	Inter Milan	33	(6)
2019–2020	→ Cagliari (loan)	26	(6)
2021	→ Cagliari (loan)	22	(1)
2021–2022	Antwerp	44	(3)
2023	SPAL	10	(1)
2023–2024	Bhayangkara	10	(1)
2025–2026	Lokeren	28	(8)
2026–	Patro Eisden	22	(6)

International career
2004	Belgium U16	1	(0)
2007	Belgium U19	2	(0)
2008–2009	Belgium U20	2	(0)
2007–2010	Belgium U21	13	(1)
2009–2018	Belgium	30	(6)
- * Club domestic league appearances and goals as of 17:03, 25 October 2026 (UTC)

Radja Nainggolan (born 4 May 1988) is a Belgian professional footballer who plays as a central midfielder for Challenger Pro League club Patro Eisden.

Nicknamed Il Ninja, he spent almost his entire professional career in Italy, representing Piacenza, Cagliari, Roma and Inter Milan. He made 367 appearances and scored 48 goals in Serie A, being named four consecutive times in its Team of the Year.

A Belgium international for eight years, Nainggolan played 30 times for his country (scoring six goals) and represented it at Euro 2016.

== Early life ==
Nainggolan was born in Antwerp, the son of Lizy Bogaerts, a Belgian woman who raised him with his three half brothers and his twin sister, and Marianus Nainggolan, an Indonesian of Toba Batak background and member of the Batak Christian Protestant Church. He was raised in Kiel, a working-class and multicultural neighbourhood of the city. His father abandoned the family when Nainggolan was still a child.

Nainggolan's mother died in 2010, and after her death he tattooed two large wings on his back with her dates of birth and death. He was raised Roman Catholic and speaks Dutch, English, French and Italian fluently.

== Club career ==
=== Piacenza ===
Nainggolan began playing football with Tubantia Borgerhout at the age of five. Seven years later, he moved to the youth team of Germinal Beerschot, where he remained until 2005 to move to Italian Serie B club Piacenza. He made his senior debut on 28 May 2006 during a home defeat to Arezzo, being inserted permanently into the first team the following season.

In the 2008–09 campaign, Nainggolan became a starter for the Emilia-Romagna side, playing 38 of 42 games and scoring three goals, which contributed to them avoiding relegation.

=== Cagliari ===
On 27 January 2010, Nainggolan was loaned to Cagliari with a buyout clause. He made his Serie A debut on 7 February, playing seven minutes in a 3–0 away loss against Inter Milan. After making seven appearances (including being sent off a few minutes after entering the field on 28 February against Chievo), the club announced it had acquired 50% of his rights in a co-ownership deal.

In the first part of 2010–11, under manager Pierpaolo Bisoli, Nainggolan started, often due to the absence of Daniele Conti. On 31 October 2010, he scored his first goal in the Italian top division, from a right-footed volley in a 2–0 home win over Bologna. On 31 January 2011, Cagliari redeemed the second half of his contract from Piacenza.

In early October 2013, after three seasons as an undisputed starter, Nainggolan agreed to an extension until 2016. His performances with the Rossoblu made him especially popular among their fans, and he was voted among the top 11 best players in the history of the Sardinian club.

=== Roma ===
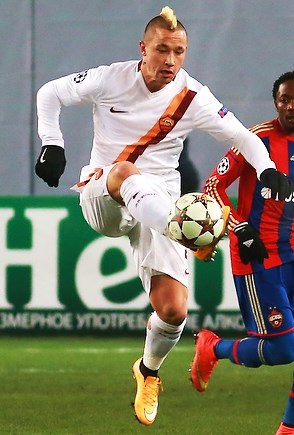
Nainggolan playing for Roma in 2014

On 7 January 2014, Nainggolan was loaned to fellow top-flight team Roma until the end of the campaign for a fee of €3 million, with an option to purchase 50% of his rights in the ensuing summer for €6 million. He made his debut two days later, starting in a 1–0 home victory over Sampdoria for the Coppa Italia which qualified for the quarter-finals. At that stage later that month, he played the full 90 minutes in a 1–0 defeat of Juventus.

On 22 February 2014, Nainggolan scored his first goal for the capital side, grabbing the 1–0 winner against Bologna. His second, which arrived on 19 April against Fiorentina (same result), ensured his team automatic qualification for the UEFA Champions League.

Nainggolan signed a permanent deal with Roma in the 2015 off-season, for €9 million. On 6 July 2016 he renewed his contract until June 2020, extending it a further year the following summer.

=== Inter Milan ===
On 26 June 2018, Nainggolan signed with Inter Milan for €38 million (€24 million plus Davide Santon and Nicolò Zaniolo, valued at €14 million) until June 2022. He scored in his league debut on 1 September, helping the visitors defeat Bologna 3–0, and just over a month later he netted the equaliser in a 2–1 comeback win at PSV in the Champions League group stage to become the first-ever Belgian to score for the club in the competition.

In August 2019, Nainggolan returned to Cagliari on a season-long loan. He was named the league's MVP for November, with two long-range goals and three assists in three matches to help his team to reach fourth place.

On 31 December 2020, Nainggolan returned to the Sardegna Arena, again on loan.

=== Antwerp ===
On 10 August 2021, Inter Milan announced that Nainggolan's contract with the club had been terminated by mutual consent; four days later, the 33-year-old signed a two-year deal with Royal Antwerp. He made his debut in his country's First Division on 22 September, starting in the 4–2 home victory against Genk. On 5 December, he scored his first goal in the competition in a 1–0 win at Beerschot, dedicating the goal to his late mother who had been insulted by the local fans.

On 17 October 2022, Nainggolan was suspended indefinitely by Antwerp after being arrested for driving with an expired driver's licence and later smoking an electronic cigarette on the bench ahead of a 3–0 loss at Standard Liége. In December, he left by mutual consent.

=== SPAL ===
After weeks of speculation, on 30 January 2023 Nainggolan officially joined Italian second-tier club SPAL, coached by former Roma team-mate and friend Daniele De Rossi, on a free transfer, signing a five-month contract with an option for one more season in case of promotion. Not only was this not achieved, they were relegated as second-bottom.

=== Bhayangkara ===
In late November 2023, Nainggolan agreed to a deal at Bhayangkara, being acquired in an effort to avoid relegation from the Liga 1 by replacing several foreign players. He was under contract for the remainder of the season, and was reported to be earning IDR 1 billion per month with a bonus of IDR 416 million per appearance; in his first press conference, he admitted that he was not aware of an Indonesian league but would "give his best so that Bhayangkara can remain in Liga 1."

After failing to appear in the previous match against PSM Makassar, Nainggolan made his debut as a substitute on 17 December in a 3–0 win over Persita Tangerang, his team's first in 17 league games. He scored his only goal on 16 March 2024, in a 2–3 home defeat to Dewa United.

=== Later career ===
On 21 January 2025, Nainggolan signed for Challenger Pro League club Lokeren-Temse on a five-month deal. On his debut, he scored an Olympic goal in a 1–1 home draw against Lierse.

For the second part of the 2025–26 season, Nainggolan moved to fellow second-tier side Patro Eisden.

== International career ==
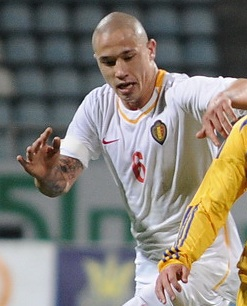
Nainggolan in action for Belgium under-21s in 2009

Due to his father's heritage, Nainggolan was eligible to represent both Indonesia and Belgium, but ultimately chose to play for the latter nation. He took part at the 2007–09 International Challenge Trophy finals, a tournament which the under-23 team won.

Nainggolan earned his first senior cap on 29 May 2009, against Chile in the Kirin Cup. He scored his first goal for the Red Devils on 5 March 2014, in a 2–2 friendly draw with Côte d'Ivoire.

On 13 May 2014, Nainggolan was selected in a standby list for the 2014 FIFA World Cup. However, he did not make the final cut.

Nainggolan was a starter for the Marc Wilmots-led side during the UEFA Euro 2016 qualifying campaign. He scored in an away draw with Bosnia and Herzegovina, and a 4–1 win in Andorra as the team qualified for the tournament for the first time in 16 years.

Nainggolan was selected to the finals in France. He made his debut in the tournament on 13 June, playing 62 minutes in a 2–0 loss against Italy. After featuring as a second-half substitute in the second game, a 3–0 defeat of the Republic of Ireland, he returned to the starting XI against Sweden, scoring the game's only goal at the Stade de Nice after a counter-attack to send his country to the knockout stage as second; in the quarter-finals, he netted from 25 metres to put his country ahead against Wales after 12 minutes, but in an eventual 3–1 loss.

On 26 August 2017, aged 29, Nainggolan announced that he would be retiring from international football after not being selected for Belgium's upcoming World Cup qualifiers, and stated that he would be focusing on his club career with Roma. However, he was selected by new manager Roberto Martínez for friendlies against Mexico and Japan in November, only to pull out due to injury.

On 21 May 2018, after once again not being picked for the upcoming World Cup in Russia, Nainggolan retired from the international scene.

== Style of play ==
Nainggolan is a versatile midfielder; owing to his vision, passing range and technique, he is often used as a playmaker in front of his team's defensive line. He can also score goals from that position, helped by his powerful and accurate shooting from distance, his movement and his late runs off the ball. His energy and range of skills led to him being used in a more attacking role as an advanced playmaker behind the two forwards during his time with Cagliari.

Due to his pace, stamina, tenacity and aggressive tackling, as well as his willingness and ability to chase down and press opponents off the ball, Nainggolan is also a good ball-winner, and has frequently been used in a box-to-box role; he is also capable of playing as a winger. After his move to Roma, he was mainly deployed as a central or defensive midfielder in a 4–3–3 formation or in the "mezzala" role, and on occasion even as a right-back; following the arrival of Luciano Spalletti, however, he returned to playing in a more advanced role as an attacking midfielder or second striker in a 4–2–3–1 or a 3–4–2–1 formation. He has also been used in a more central or attacking role on occasion, or even as a false attacking midfielder.

In addition to his footballing abilities, Nainggolan has also been praised for his leadership in the media, although he has also drawn criticism for his difficult character and his involvement in several controversial incidents off the pitch.

== Outside of football ==
=== Personal life ===
Nainggolan married Claudia Lai, with the couple being parents to daughters Aysha (b. 2012) and Mailey (b. 2016). His twin sister, Riana, is also a footballer; she is openly lesbian and he has spoken out against homophobia.

On 10 July 2019, Lai confirmed in an Instagram post that she had been diagnosed with cancer and would begin chemotherapy treatment.

=== Controversy ===
Nainggolan smoked cigarettes during his playing career. On New Year's Eve 2018, he became the subject of strong controversy in Italy after he posted a video on Instagram cursing, drinking alcohol and smoking.

=== Ambassadorship ===
On 8 November 2023, Nainggolan was appointed as promotional ambassador for the 2023 FIFA U-17 World Cup with fellow footballer Sabreena Dressler.

=== Arrest ===
On 27 January 2025, Nainggolan was arrested by Belgian police as part of an investigation into cocaine-smuggling in the Port of Antwerp. He was charged the next day with "participating in a criminal organisation" as a member, and was released on bail afterwards.

== Career statistics ==
=== Club ===
As of match played 25 October 2026

Appearances and goals by club, season and competition
Club	Season	League			National cup (Note: Includes Coppa Italia and Belgian Cup)		Europe		Total	
Club	Season	Division	Apps	Goals	Apps	Goals	Apps	Goals	Apps	Goals
Piacenza	2005–06	Serie B	1	0	0	0	—		1	0
Piacenza	2006–07	Serie B	1	0	0	0	—		1	0
Piacenza	2007–08	Serie B	10	0	1	0	—		11	0
Piacenza	2008–09	Serie B	38	3	1	0	—		39	3
Piacenza	2009–10	Serie B	21	1	1	0	—		22	1
Piacenza	Total		71	4	3	0	—		74	4
Cagliari	2009–10	Serie A	7	0	0	0	—		7	0
Cagliari	2010–11	Serie A	36	2	2	0	—		38	2
Cagliari	2011–12	Serie A	37	1	2	0	—		39	1
Cagliari	2012–13	Serie A	34	2	1	0	—		35	2
Cagliari	2013–14	Serie A	17	2	1	0	—		18	2
Cagliari	Total		131	7	6	0	—		137	7
Roma (loan)	2013–14	Serie A	17	2	3	0	—		20	2
Roma	2014–15	Serie A	35	5	2	0	9 (Note: Six appearances in UEFA Champions League, three appearances in UEFA Europa League)	0	46	5
Roma	2015–16	Serie A	35	6	0	0	7 (Note: Appearances in UEFA Champions League)	0	42	6
Roma	2016–17	Serie A	37	11	4	2	12 (Note: Two appearances in UEFA Champions League, ten appearances and one goal in UEFA Europa League)	1	53	14
Roma	2017–18	Serie A	31	4	0	0	11	2	42	6
Roma	Total		155	28	9	2	39	3	203	33
Inter Milan	2018–19	Serie A	29	6	1	0	6 (Note: Four appearances and one goal in UEFA Champions League, two appearances in UEFA Europa League)	1	36	7
Inter Milan	2020–21	Serie A	4	0	0	0	1	0	5	0
Inter Milan	Total		33	6	1	0	7	1	41	7
Cagliari (loan)	2019–20	Serie A	26	6	3	0	—		29	6
Cagliari (loan)	2020–21	Serie A	22	1	0	0	—		22	1
Cagliari (loan)	Total		48	7	3	0	—		51	7
Antwerp	2021–22	Belgian Pro League	32	2	0	0	5 (Note: Appearances in UEFA Europa League)	1	37	3
Antwerp	2022–23	Belgian Pro League	12	1	0	0	6 (Note: Appearances in UEFA Europa Conference League)	2	18	3
Antwerp	Total		44	3	0	0	11	3	55	6
SPAL	2022–23	Serie B	10	1	—		—		10	1
Bhayangkara	2023–24	Liga 1	10	1	—		—		10	1
Lokeren-Temse	2024–25	Challenger Pro League	15	3	—		—		15	3
Lokeren-Temse	2025–26	Challenger Pro League	13	5	1	0	—		14	5
Lokeren-Temse	Total		28	8	1	0	—		29	8
Patro Eisden	2025–26	Challenger Pro League	15	3	—		—		15	3
Patro Eisden	2026–27	Challenger Pro League	7	3	1	0	—		8	3
Patro Eisden	Total		22	6	1	0	—		23	6
Career total			552	71	24	2	57	7	633	80

=== International ===
Appearances and goals by national team and year
National team	Year	Apps	Goals
Belgium	2009	1	0
Belgium	2010	0	0
Belgium	2011	1	0
Belgium	2012	1	0
Belgium	2013	1	0
Belgium	2014	4	2
Belgium	2015	9	2
Belgium	2016	9	2
Belgium	2017	3	0
Belgium	2018	1	0
Total		30	6

Scores and results list Belgium's goal tally first, score column indicates score after each Nainggolan goal.

List of international goals scored by Radja Nainggolan
No.	Date	Venue	Cap	Opponent	Score	Result	Competition
1	5 March 2014	King Baudouin, Brussels, Belgium	5	Ivory Coast	2–0	2–2	Friendly
2	13 October 2014	Bilino Polje, Zenica, Bosnia and Herzegovina	8	Bosnia and Herzegovina	1–1	1–1	UEFA Euro 2016 qualifying
3	7 June 2015	Stade de France, Saint-Denis, France	11	France	3–0	4–3	Friendly
4	10 October 2015	Estadi Nacional, Andorra la Vella, Andorra	15	Andorra	1–0	4–1	UEFA Euro 2016 qualifying
5	22 June 2016	Allianz Riviera, Nice, France	22	Sweden	1–0	1–0	UEFA Euro 2016
6	1 July 2016	Stade Pierre-Mauroy, Villeneuve-d'Ascq, France	24	Wales	1–0	1–3	UEFA Euro 2016

== Honours ==
Inter Milan

- Serie A: 2020–21

Antwerp

- Belgian Pro League: 2022–23

Individual

- Serie A Team of the Year: 2014–15, 2015–16, 2016–17, 2017–18
- AS Roma Player of the Season: 2016–17
- Serie A Player of the Month: November 2019
