= Filippo Franchi =

Italian football player (born 1998)

Personal information
- Date of birth: 14 January 1998 (age 28)
- Place of birth: Rome, Italy
- Height: 1.78 m (5 ft 10 in)
- Position: Winger

Team information
- Current team: ASD Borgo Palidoro

Youth career
- Roma

Senior career*
Years	Team	Apps	(Gls)
2017–2018	Roma	0	(0)
2017–2018	→ Akragas (loan)	16	(1)
2018	→ Reggina (loan)	0	(0)
2018	Matelica	15	(2)
2018–2019	Tuttocuoio	22	(0)
2019	Avezzano	13	(1)
2019–2020	Chieti	12	(1)
2020–2021	Matelica	26	(1)
2021	Aurora Alto Casertano	5	(0)
2021–2022	Tritium	10	(0)
2022	Ostiamare	11	(1)
2022–2023	Campobasso		
2023–2024	ASD LUISS 1999		
2024–2025	ASD Atletico Vescovio		
2025–	ASD Borgo Palidoro		
- * Club domestic league appearances and goals as of 20 February 2026

Filippo Franchi (born 14 January 1998) is an Italian footballer who plays as a winger for ASD Borgo Palidoro.

== Club career ==
=== Roma ===
==== Loan to Akragas and Reggina ====
On 4 August 2017, Franchi was loaned to Serie C club Akragas on a season-long loan deal. On 2 September he made his professional debut in Serie C for Akragas as a substitute replacing Vincenzo Carrotta in the 60th minute of a 3–2 home defeat against Rende. On 16 September, Franchi scored his first professional goal, as a substitute, in the 95th minute of a 2–0 home win over Paganese. On 21 January 2018, Franchi played his first match as a starter for Akragas, a 3–2 home defeat against Monopoli, he was replaced by Marco Saitta in the 79th minute. In late January 2018, Franchi was re-called to Roma leaving Akragas with 16 appearances, only 1 as a starter, 1 goal and 1 assist.

On 31 January 2018, Franchi was signed by Serie C club Reggina on a 6-month loan deal. Franchi ended his loan to Reggina without made any appearances for the club, he was an unused substitute 13 times.

=== Matelica ===
On 26 July 2018, Franchi joined to Serie D side Matelica on a free-transfer.

=== Chieti ===
In December 2019 it was confirmed, that Franchi had signed with another Serie D club, Chieti.

=== Back to Matelica ===
On 18 August 2020 he returned to Matelica, now in Serie C.

== Career statistics ==
=== Club ===
As of 24 February 2018

Club	Season	League			Cup		Europe		Other		Total	
Club	Season	League	Apps	Goals	Apps	Goals	Apps	Goals	Apps	Goals	Apps	Goals
Akragas (loan)	2017–18	Serie C	16	1	0	0	—		—		16	1
Reggina (loan)	2017–18	Serie C	0	0	—		—		—		0	0
Matelica	2018–19	Serie D	0	0	—		—		—		0	0
Career total			16	1	0	0	—		—		16	1

== Honours ==
Roma Primavera

- Campionato Nazionale Primavera: 2015–16
- Coppa Italia Primavera: 2016–17
