= 2016–17 AS Roma season =

Roma
2016–17 season
- President: James Pallotta
- Manager: Luciano Spalletti
- Stadium: Stadio Olimpico
- Serie A: 2nd
- Coppa Italia: Semi-finals
- UEFA Champions League: Play-off round
- UEFA Europa League: Round of 16
- Top goalscorer: League: Edin Džeko (29); All: Edin Džeko (39)
- Highest home attendance: 59,716 vs Genoa (28 May 2017, Serie A)
- Lowest home attendance: 13,509 vs Astra Giurgiu (29 September 2016, Europa League)
- Average home league attendance: 32,638
Home colours	Away colours	Third colours

The 2016–17 season was Associazione Sportiva Roma's 89th in existence and 88th season in the top flight of Italian football. The team competed in four competitions: in Serie A, finishing as runners-up for the third time in four seasons; the Coppa Italia, where they were eliminated in the semi-finals by city rivals Lazio; the UEFA Champions League, where the club was eliminated in the play-off round by Portuguese club Porto; and in the UEFA Europa League, in which the team reached the round of 16 only to be eliminated by eventual semi-finalists Lyon.

The season was notable for being club legend and veteran Francesco Totti's 24th and last, as his retirement as a Roma player was confirmed shortly before the last match of the season against Genoa. In addition, Bosnian striker Edin Džeko won the prestigious top scorer award in Serie A, the capocannoniere, with 29 goals, becoming the first Roma player in a decade to win the award. He also won the top scorer award in the Europa League with eight goals, tied with Zenit Saint Petersburg striker Giuliano.

== Players ==
=== Squad information ===
Last updated on 28 May 2017
Appearances include all competitions

No.	Player	Nat.	Position(s)	Date of birth (age at end of season)	Signed from	Signed in	Contract ends	Apps	Goals
Goalkeepers
1	Wojciech Szczęsny	(Poland)	GK	18 April 1990 (aged 27)	(England) Arsenal	2015	2017	81	0
18	Bogdan Lobonț	(Romania)	GK	18 January 1978 (aged 39)	(Romania) Dinamo București	2009	2018	28	0
19	Alisson	(Brazil)	GK	2 October 1992 (aged 24)	(Brazil) Internacional	2016	2021	15	0
Defenders
2	Antonio Rüdiger	(Germany)	CB / RB	3 March 1993 (aged 24)	(Germany) VfB Stuttgart	2015	2020	72	2
3	Juan Jesus	(Brazil)	CB / LB	10 June 1991 (aged 26)	(Italy) Internazionale	2016	2017	33	0
13	Bruno Peres	(Brazil)	RB / RM	1 March 1990 (aged 27)	(Italy) Torino	2016	2017	44	2
15	Thomas Vermaelen	(Belgium)	CB	14 November 1985 (aged 31)	(Spain) Barcelona	2016	2017	12	0
20	Federico Fazio	(Argentina)	CB	17 March 1987 (aged 30)	(England) Tottenham Hotspur	2016	2017	48	4
21	Mário Rui	(Portugal)	LB / LM	17 May 1991 (aged 26)	(Italy) Empoli	2016	2017	9	0
33	Emerson	(Brazil)	LB / LM	13 March 1994 (aged 23)	(Brazil) Santos	2015	2017	45	2
44	Kostas Manolas	(Greece)	CB	14 June 1991 (aged 26)	(Greece) Olympiacos	2014	2019	131	2
Midfielders
4	Radja Nainggolan	(Belgium)	CM / AM	4 May 1989 (aged 28)	(Italy) Cagliari	2014	2020	161	27
5	Leandro Paredes	(Argentina)	DM / CM	29 June 1994 (aged 23)	(Argentina) Boca Juniors	2014	2019	54	4
6	Kevin Strootman	(Netherlands)	DM / CM	13 February 1990 (aged 27)	(Netherlands) PSV Eindhoven	2013	2018	86	12
7	Clément Grenier	(France)	CM / AM / RW	7 January 1991 (aged 26)	(France) Lyon	2017	2017	6	0
16	Daniele De Rossi (vice-captain)	(Italy)	DM / CM	24 July 1983 (aged 33)	(Italy) Youth Sector	2001	2017	561	59
24	Alessandro Florenzi	(Italy)	RB / CM / RW	11 March 1991 (aged 26)	(Italy) Youth Sector	2011	2019	182	24
30	Gerson	(Brazil)	CM / AM / RW	20 May 1997 (aged 20)	(Brazil) Fluminense	2016	2021	11	0
Forwards
8	Diego Perotti	(Argentina)	AM / LW / RW	26 July 1988 (aged 28)	(Italy) Genoa	2016	2019	62	13
9	Edin Džeko	(Bosnia and Herzegovina)	CF / ST	17 March 1986 (aged 31)	(England) Manchester City	2015	2020	90	49
10	Francesco Totti (captain)	(Italy)	AM / LW / SS / CF / ST	27 September 1976 (aged 40)	(Italy) Youth Sector	1992	2017	783	306
11	Mohamed Salah	(Egypt)	RW	15 June 1992 (aged 25)	(England) Chelsea	2015	2019	83	34
92	Stephan El Shaarawy	(Italy)	LW	27 October 1992 (aged 24)	(Italy) Milan	2016	2020	62	20
Players transferred during the season
7	Juan Iturbe	(Paraguay)	SS / LW / RW	4 June 1993 (aged 24)	(Italy) Hellas Verona	2014	2019	68	5
17	Moustapha Seck	(Senegal)	CB	23 February 1996 (aged 21)	(Italy) Lazio Youth Sector	2016		1	0

== Transfers ==
=== In ===
Date	Pos.	Player	Age	Moving from	Fee	Notes	Source
30 May 2016	DF	(Germany) Antonio Rüdiger	23	(Germany) VfB Stuttgart	€9M	Bought out loan	
21 June 2016	DF	(Slovakia) Norbert Gyömbér	24	(Italy) Catania	€1.5M	Bought out loan	
21 June 2016	FW	(Italy) Stephan El Shaarawy	23	(Italy) Milan	€13M	Bought out loan	
21 June 2016	FW	(Nigeria) Umar Sadiq	19	(Italy) Spezia	€2.5M	Bought out loan	
21 June 2016	DF	(Nigeria) Nura Abdullahi	18	(Italy) Spezia	€2.5M	Bought out loan	
6 July 2016	GK	(Brazil) Alisson	23	(Brazil) Internacional	€8M		
3 August 2016	FW	(Egypt) Mohamed Salah	24	(England) Chelsea	€15M	Bought out loan	
1 March 2017	DF	(Brazil) Emerson	22	(Brazil) Santos	€2M	Bought out loan	

==== Loans in ====
Date	Pos.	Player	Age	Moving from	Fee	Notes	Source
8 July 2016	DF	(Portugal) Mário Rui	25	(Italy) Empoli	€3M	Loan with a mandatory option to buy for €6M	
14 July 2016	DF	(Brazil) Juan Jesus	25	(Italy) Internazionale	€2M	Loan with a mandatory option to buy for €8M	
3 August 2016	DF	(Argentina) Federico Fazio	29	(England) Tottenham Hotspur	€1.2M	Loan with an option to buy for €3.2M	
4 August 2016	GK	(Poland) Wojciech Szczęsny	26	(England) Arsenal	Loan	Second consecutive loan spell with Roma	
8 August 2016	DF	(Belgium) Thomas Vermaelen	30	(Spain) Barcelona	Loan		
16 August 2016	DF	(Brazil) Bruno Peres	26	(Italy) Torino	€1M	Loan with an option to buy for €12.5M	
28 January 2017	MF	(France) Clément Grenier	26	(France) Lyon	Loan	Loan with an option to buy for €3.5M	

=== Out ===
Date	Pos.	Player	Age	Moving to	Fee	Notes	Source
13 June 2016	MF	(Bosnia and Herzegovina) Miralem Pjanić	26	(Italy) Juventus	€32M		
1 July 2016	DF	(France) Lucas Digne	22	(France) Paris Saint-Germain	Free	Loan return	
1 July 2016	MF	(Mali) Seydou Keita	36	Free agent	Free	End of contract	
1 July 2016	DF	(Brazil) Maicon	34	Free agent	Free	End of contract	
1 July 2016	MF	(Turkey) Salih Uçan	22	(Turkey) Fenerbahçe	Free	Loan return	
13 July 2016	GK	(Italy) Morgan De Sanctis	39	(France) Monaco	Free		
15 July 2016	FW	(Paraguay) Antonio Sanabria	20	(Spain) Real Betis	€7.5M		
18 July 2016	FW	(Serbia) Adem Ljajić	24	(Italy) Torino	€8.5M		
31 August 2016	DF	(Greece) Vasilis Torosidis	31	(Italy) Bologna	Undisclosed		
4 January 2017	FW	(Spain) Iago Falque	27	(Italy) Torino	€6M	Bought out loan	

==== Loans out ====
Date	Pos.	Player	Age	Moving to	Fee	Notes	Source
28 June 2016	FW	(Ivory Coast) Seydou Doumbia	28	(Switzerland) Basel	Loan		
5 July 2016	MF	(Italy) Nicola Falasco	22	(Italy) Cesena	Loan		
5 July 2016	MF	(Italy) Matteo Ricci	22	(Italy) Perugia	Loan		
10 July 2016	DF	(Brazil) Leandro Castán	29	(Italy) Sampdoria	Loan		
18 July 2016	FW	(Spain) Iago Falque	26	(Italy) Torino	Loan	Loan with an option to buy	
21 July 2016	DF	(Bosnia and Herzegovina) Ervin Zukanović	29	(Italy) Atalanta	Loan	Loan with an option to buy	
5 August 2016	FW	(Argentina) Ezequiel Ponce	19	(Spain) Granada	Loan		
13 August 2016	DF	(Slovakia) Norbert Gyömbér	24	(Italy) Pescara	Loan		
18 August 2016	DF	(Brazil) Leandro Castán	29	(Italy) Torino	Loan	Former loan to Sampdoria ended before Castán made an appearance	
31 August 2016	FW	(Italy) Federico Ricci	22	(Italy) Sassuolo	Loan	Loan with an option to buy	
31 August 2016	FW	(Nigeria) Umar Sadiq	19	(Italy) Bologna	Loan	Loan with an option to buy	
31 August 2016	MF	(France) William Vainqueur	27	(France) Marseille	Loan	Loan with an option to buy	
4 January 2017	FW	(Paraguay) Juan Iturbe	23	(Italy) Torino	Loan	Loan with an option to buy for €12.5M	

== Pre-season and friendlies ==
13 July 2016 Friendly	Pinzolo (Italy)	0–16	(Italy) Roma	Pinzolo
		Report	Salah 5', 9'; Džeko 16', 19', 25', 31'; D'Urso 17'; Torosidis 28'; Perotti 42'; Iturbe 56' (pen.), 83'; Ricci 63', 79'; Gerson 73'; Ponce 75'; Di Livio 80'

17 July 2016 Friendly	Roma (Italy)	3–2	(Russia) Terek Grozny	Pinzolo
	Perotti 42'; Džeko 55'; Marchizza 85'	Report	Ivanov 54'; Grozav 81'

1 August 2016 Friendly	Roma (Italy)	2–1	(England) Liverpool	St. Louis, United States
	Džeko 29'; Salah 62'	Report	Ojo 45'	Stadium: Busch Stadium

3 August 2016 Friendly	Montreal Impact (Canada)	0–2	(Italy) Roma	Montreal, Canada
			Džeko 7'; Nainggolan 21'	Stadium: Saputo Stadium

10 August 2016 Friendly	Latina (Italy)	0–1	(Italy) Roma	Latina, Italy
			Fazio 10'	Stadium: Stadio Domenico Francioni

== Competitions ==
=== Overall ===
Competition	Started round	Final position	First match	Last match
Serie A	Matchday 1	2nd	20 August 2016	28 May 2017
Coppa Italia	Round of 16	Semi-finals	19 January 2017	4 April 2017
Champions League	Play-off round	Play-off round	17 August 2016	23 August 2016
Europa League	Group stage	Round of 16	15 September 2016	16 March 2017

Last updated: 28 May 2017

=== Serie A ===
==== League table ====
Pos	Team	Pld	W	D	L	GF	GA	GD	Pts	Qualification or relegation
1	Juventus (C)	38	29	4	5	77	27	+50	91	Qualification for the Champions League group stage
2	Roma	38	28	3	7	90	38	+52	87	Qualification for the Champions League group stage
3	Napoli	38	26	8	4	94	39	+55	86	Qualification for the Champions League play-off round
4	Atalanta	38	21	9	8	62	41	+21	72	Qualification for the Europa League group stage (Note: Since the winners of the 2016–17 Coppa Italia, Juventus, qualified for European competition based on league position, the spot awarded to the cup winners (Europa League group stage) was passed to the fifth-placed team and the spot awarded to the fifth-placed team (Europa League third qualifying round) was passed to the sixth-placed team.)
5	Lazio	38	21	7	10	74	51	+23	70	Qualification for the Europa League group stage

Source: Serie A, Soccerway
Rules for classification: 1) Points; 2) Head-to-head points; 3) Head-to-head goal difference; 4) Goal difference; 5) Goals scored; 6) Draw.
(C) Champions

==== Results summary ====
Overall								Home						Away					
Pld	W	D	L	GF	GA	GD	Pts	W	D	L	GF	GA	GD	W	D	L	GF	GA	GD
38	28	3	7	90	38	+52	87	16	1	2	50	18	+32	12	2	5	40	20	+20

Last updated: 28 May 2017.
Source: Competitive matches

==== Results by round ====
Round	1	2	3	4	5	6	7	8	9	10	11	12	13	14	15	16	17	18	19	20	21	22	23	24	25	26	27	28	29	30	31	32	33	34	35	36	37	38
Ground	H	A	H	A	H	A	H	A	H	A	A	H	A	H	A	H	A	H	A	A	H	A	H	A	H	A	H	A	H	H	A	H	A	H	A	H	A	H
Result	W	D	W	L	W	L	W	W	W	W	D	W	L	W	W	W	L	W	W	W	W	L	W	W	W	W	L	W	W	W	W	D	W	L	W	W	W	W
Position	1	4	3	3	3	4	3	2	2	2	2	2	2	2	2	2	2	2	2	2	2	2	2	2	2	2	2	2	2	2	2	2	2	2	2	2	2	2

Updated to match(es) played on 28 May 2017. Source: Competitive matches
A = Away; H = Home; W = Win; D = Draw; L = Loss

==== Matches ====
20 August 2016 1	Roma	4–0	Udinese	Rome
18:00 CEST (UTC+02:00)	Perotti 65' (pen.), 75' (pen.); Džeko 82'; Salah 84'	Report	Samir (yellow card) 49'; Danilo (yellow card) 64'	Stadium: Stadio Olimpico; Attendance: 30,940; Referee: Marco Di Bello

28 August 2016 2	Cagliari	2–2	Roma	Cagliari
20:45 CEST (UTC+02:00)	Isla (yellow card) 21'; Murru (yellow card) 23'; Salamon (yellow card) 39'; Borriello 56'; Sau 87'	Report	Perotti 6' (pen.); Florenzi (yellow card) 45'; Strootman 46'	Stadium: Stadio Sant'Elia; Attendance: 15,406; Referee: Paolo Mazzoleni

11 September 2016 3	Roma	3–2	Sampdoria	Rome
15:00 CEST (UTC+02:00)	Salah 8'; Džeko 61'; De Rossi (yellow card) 70'; Juan Jesus (yellow card) 78'; Totti 90+3' (pen.)	Report	Muriel 18'; Quagliarella 41'; Sala (yellow card) 63'; Álvarez (yellow card) 90+3' (red card) 90+3'	Stadium: Stadio Olimpico; Attendance: 27,630; Referee: Piero Giacomelli
Note: The match was interrupted for 80 minutes during half-time due to rain.

18 September 2016 4	Fiorentina	1–0	Roma	Florence
20:45 CEST (UTC+02:00)	Sánchez (yellow card) 31'; Badelj 82'	Report	Florenzi (yellow card) 63'	Stadium: Stadio Artemio Franchi; Attendance: 27,359; Referee: Nicola Rizzoli

21 September 2016 5	Roma	4–0	Crotone	Rome
20:45 CEST (UTC+02:00)	El Shaarawy 26'; Salah 37'; Džeko 48', 57'	Report	Nalini (yellow card) 50'	Stadium: Stadio Olimpico; Attendance: 24,325; Referee: Carmine Russo

25 September 2016 6	Torino	3–1	Roma	Turin
12:30 CEST (UTC+02:00)	Belotti 8'; Falque 53' (pen.), 65'; Hart (yellow card) 79'	Report	De Rossi (yellow card) 12'; Totti 55' (pen.); Bruno Peres (yellow card) 56'; Florenzi (yellow card) 69'; Manolas (yellow card) 86'	Stadium: Stadio Olimpico Grande Torino; Attendance: 19,275; Referee: Paolo Tagliavento

2 October 2016 7	Roma	2–1	Internazionale	Rome
20:45 CEST (UTC+02:00)	Džeko 5'; Juan Jesus (yellow card) 64'; Icardi 76' (o.g.)	Report	Santon (yellow card) 24'; Ansaldi (yellow card) 36'; Banega 72'	Stadium: Stadio Olimpico; Attendance: 36,340; Referee: Luca Banti

15 October 2016 8	Napoli	1–3	Roma	Naples
15:00 CEST (UTC+02:00)	Mertens (yellow card) 53'; Koulibaly 58'; Allan (yellow card) 85'	Report	Džeko 43', 54', (yellow card) 83'; Paredes (yellow card) 45+1'; Juan Jesus (yellow card) 50'; Salah 85'	Stadium: Stadio San Paolo; Attendance: 46,078; Referee: Daniele Orsato

23 October 2016 9	Roma	4–1	Palermo	Rome
20:45 CEST (UTC+02:00)	Manolas (yellow card) 27'; Salah 31', (yellow card) 84'; Juan Jesus (yellow card) 36'; Paredes 51'; Džeko 68'; El Shaarawy 82'	Report	Goldaniga (yellow card) 35'; Chochev (yellow card) 39'; Quaison 80'	Stadium: Stadio Olimpico; Attendance: 25,820; Referee: Gianpaolo Calvarese

26 October 2016 10	Sassuolo	1–3	Roma	Reggio Emilia
20:45 CEST (UTC+02:00)	Cannavaro 12'; Mazzitelli (yellow card) 30'; Pellegrini (yellow card) 72'; Lirola (yellow card) 75'	Report	Džeko 57', 76' (pen.); Nainggolan 78'	Stadium: Mapei Stadium – Città del Tricolore; Attendance: 13,221; Referee: Antonio Damato

30 October 2016 11	Empoli	0–0	Roma	Empoli
15:00 CET (UTC+01:00)	Veseli (yellow card) 11'; Bellusci (yellow card) 18'; Pasqual (yellow card) 35'; Dioussé (yellow card) 62'; Gilardino (yellow card) 67'; Tello (yellow card) 76'	Report	Manolas (yellow card) 30'; De Rossi (yellow card) 68'; Salah (yellow card) 90+3'	Stadium: Stadio Carlo Castellani; Attendance: 11,671; Referee: Marco Di Bello

6 November 2016 12	Roma	3–0	Bologna	Rome
20:45 CET (UTC+01:00)	Salah 13', 62', 71'; Paredes (yellow card) 64'	Report		Stadium: Stadio Olimpico; Attendance: 24,600; Referee: Piero Giacomelli

20 November 2016 13	Atalanta	2–1	Roma	Bergamo
15:00 CET (UTC+01:00)	Toloi (yellow card) 40'; Caldara 62'; Kessié 90' (pen.)	Report	Perotti 40' (pen.); Strootman (yellow card) 53'; Džeko (yellow card) 90'	Stadium: Stadio Atleti Azzurri d'Italia; Attendance: 19,154; Referee: Gianluca Rocchi

27 November 2016 14	Roma	3–2	Pescara	Rome
20:45 CET (UTC+01:00)	Džeko 7', 10'; Rüdiger (yellow card) 32'; Nainggolan (yellow card) 39'; Emerson (yellow card) 62'; Perotti 71' (pen.)	Report	Biraghi (yellow card) 31'; Memushaj 60'; Župarić (yellow card) 67'; Caprari 74', (yellow card) 82'	Stadium: Stadio Olimpico; Attendance: 23,633; Referee: Massimiliano Irrati

4 December 2016 15	Lazio	0–2	Roma	Rome
15:00 CET (UTC+01:00)	Biglia (yellow card) 29'; Cataldi (red card) 67'; Lulić (yellow card) 70'; Parolo (yellow card) 79'; Lombardi (yellow card) 90+4'	Report	Rüdiger (yellow card) 51'; Strootman 64', (yellow card) 67'; Nainggolan 77'; Bruno Peres (yellow card) 84'	Stadium: Stadio Olimpico; Attendance: 40,000; Referee: Luca Banti
Note: Danilo Cataldi was sent off for fighting while a substitute.

12 December 2016 16	Roma	1–0	Milan	Rome
21:00 CET (UTC+01:00)	Nainggolan 62'; Rüdiger (yellow card) 84'	Report	Pašalić (yellow card) 18'; Paletta (yellow card) 79'	Stadium: Stadio Olimpico; Attendance: 41,841; Referee: Paolo Mazzoleni

17 December 2016 17	Juventus	1–0	Roma	Turin
20:45 CET (UTC+01:00)	Higuaín 14'; Rugani (yellow card) 26'; Alex Sandro (yellow card) 78'; Sturaro (yellow card) 90+3'	Report	De Rossi (yellow card) 12'; Džeko (yellow card) 16'; Gerson (yellow card) 28'; Nainggolan (yellow card) 89'; Rüdiger (yellow card) 90'	Stadium: Juventus Stadium; Attendance: 41,470; Referee: Daniele Orsato

22 December 2016 18	Roma	3–1	Chievo	Rome
20:45 CET (UTC+01:00)	El Shaarawy 45+1'; Džeko 52'; Perotti 90+3' (pen.)	Report	De Guzmán 37'; Dainelli (yellow card) 45'; Rigoni (yellow card) 88'	Stadium: Stadio Olimpico; Attendance: 25,058; Referee: Gianpaolo Calvarese

8 January 2017 19	Genoa	0–1	Roma	Genoa
15:00 CET (UTC+01:00)	Cofie (yellow card) 27'; Ocampos (yellow card) 81'	Report	Izzo 36' (o.g.); Rüdiger (yellow card) 38'; De Rossi (yellow card) 49'; Strootman (yellow card) 66'; Fazio (yellow card) 84'	Stadium: Stadio Luigi Ferraris; Attendance: 21,289; Referee: Nicola Rizzoli

15 January 2017 20	Udinese	0–1	Roma	Udine
15:00 CET (UTC+01:00)	Felipe (yellow card) 75'; Fofana (yellow card) 77'	Report	Nainggolan 12'; Juan Jesus (yellow card) 41'	Stadium: Stadio Friuli; Attendance: 16,825; Referee: Antonio Damato

22 January 2017 21	Roma	1–0	Cagliari	Rome
20:45 CET (UTC+01:00)	Džeko 55'; Manolas (yellow card) 87'	Report	Pisacane (yellow card) 18'; Ceppitelli (yellow card) 82'; Barella (yellow card) 89'; João Pedro (red card) 90+3'	Stadium: Stadio Olimpico; Attendance: 23,961; Referee: Marco Guida

29 January 2017 22	Sampdoria	3–2	Roma	Genoa
15:00 CET (UTC+01:00)	Praet 21'; Torreira (yellow card) 29'; Puggioni (yellow card) 60'; Schick 71'; Muriel 73'	Report	Bruno Peres 5'; Vermaelen (yellow card) 51'; Džeko 66'; Rüdiger (yellow card) 72'; Totti (yellow card) 90+1'	Stadium: Stadio Luigi Ferraris; Attendance: 19,799; Referee: Paolo Mazzoleni

7 February 2017 23	Roma	4–0	Fiorentina	Rome
20:45 CET (UTC+01:00)	Strootman (yellow card) 18'; Džeko 39', 83'; De Rossi (yellow card) 56'; Fazio 58'; Nainggolan 75'	Report	Sánchez (yellow card) 35'; Valero (yellow card) 41'; Gonzalo (yellow card) 57'	Stadium: Stadio Olimpico; Attendance: 25,394; Referee: Massimiliano Irrati

12 February 2017 24	Crotone	0–2	Roma	Crotone
12:30 CET (UTC+01:00)		Report	Nainggolan 40'; Džeko 77'	Stadium: Stadio Ezio Scida; Attendance: 11,309; Referee: Carmine Russo

19 February 2017 25	Roma	4–1	Torino	Rome
18:00 CET (UTC+01:00)	Džeko 10'; Salah 17'; Paredes 65'; Nainggolan 90+1'	Report	Lukić (yellow card) 56'; Benassi (yellow card) 61'; López 84'	Stadium: Stadio Olimpico; Attendance: 31,165; Referee: Marco Guida

26 February 2017 26	Internazionale	1–3	Roma	Milan
20:45 CET (UTC+01:00)	Perišić (yellow card) 6'; Icardi 81'; Murillo (yellow card) 83'	Report	Nainggolan 12', 56'; De Rossi (yellow card) 40'; Fazio (yellow card) 83'; Perotti 85' (pen.)	Stadium: San Siro; Attendance: 58,652; Referee: Paolo Tagliavento

4 March 2017 27	Roma	1–2	Napoli	Rome
15:00 CET (UTC+01:00)	Manolas (yellow card) 45'; De Rossi (yellow card) 65'; Strootman 89'; Perotti (yellow card) 90+4'	Report	Rog (yellow card) 17'; Mertens 26', 50'; Ghoulam (yellow card) 83'	Stadium: Stadio Olimpico; Attendance: 30,909; Referee: Luca Banti

12 March 2017 28	Palermo	0–3	Roma	Palermo
20:45 CET (UTC+01:00)	Bruno Henrique (yellow card) 18'; Gazzi (yellow card) 67'	Report	Bruno Peres (yellow card) 15', (goal) 90+1'; El Shaarawy 22'; Paredes (yellow card) 54'; Grenier (yellow card) 61'; Džeko 76'	Stadium: Stadio Renzo Barbera; Attendance: 12,961; Referee: Gianluca Rocchi

19 March 2017 29	Roma	3–1	Sassuolo	Rome
20:45 CET (UTC+01:00)	Paredes 16'; Salah 45+2'; Džeko 68'; Strootman (yellow card) 90+4'	Report	Defrel 9'; Letschert (yellow card) 37'; Peluso (yellow card) 90+3'	Stadium: Stadio Olimpico; Attendance: 25,477; Referee: Marco Di Bello

1 April 2017 30	Roma	2–0	Empoli	Rome
20:45 CEST (UTC+02:00)	Džeko 12', 56'	Report	Krunić (yellow card) 43'	Stadium: Stadio Olimpico; Attendance: 31,946; Referee: Davide Massa

9 April 2017 31	Bologna	0–3	Roma	Bologna
15:00 CEST (UTC+02:00)	Maietta (yellow card) 69'; Džemaili (yellow card) 75'; Petković (yellow card) 84'	Report	Fazio 25'; Manolas (yellow card) 38'; Salah 41'; Strootman (yellow card) 69'; Džeko 75'	Stadium: Stadio Renato Dall'Ara; Attendance: 22,947; Referee: Antonio Damato

15 April 2017 32	Roma	1–1	Atalanta	Rome
15:00 CEST (UTC+02:00)	Džeko 50'; Mário Rui (yellow card) 72'; Rüdiger (yellow card) 87'	Report	Kurtić 22', (yellow card) 23'; Hateboer (yellow card) 42'; Gollini (yellow card) 70'	Stadium: Stadio Olimpico; Attendance: 34,546; Referee: Piero Giacomelli

24 April 2017 33	Pescara	1–4	Roma	Pescara
20:45 CEST (UTC+02:00)	Biraghi (yellow card) 37'; Muntari (yellow card) 40'; Benali 83'	Report	Strootman 44'; Nainggolan 45'; Salah 48', 60'	Stadium: Stadio Adriatico – Giovanni Cornacchia; Attendance: 15,368; Referee: Massimiliano Irrati

30 April 2017 34	Roma	1–3	Lazio	Rome
12:30 CEST (UTC+02:00)	De Rossi 45' (pen.); Rüdiger (red card) 90+3'	Report	Keita 12', 85', (yellow card) 87'; Biglia (yellow card) 45'; Basta 50'; Hoedt (yellow card) 81'; Parolo (yellow card) 90+3'	Stadium: Stadio Olimpico; Attendance: 43,794; Referee: Daniele Orsato

7 May 2017 35	Milan	1–4	Roma	Milan
20:45 CEST (UTC+02:00)	Vangioni (yellow card) 48'; Lapadula (yellow card) 59'; Bertolacci (yellow card) 63'; Pašalić 76'; Ocampos (yellow card) 77'; Paletta (red card) 86'	Report	Džeko 8', 28'; Manolas (yellow card) 64'; El Shaarawy 78'; De Rossi 87' (pen.)	Stadium: San Siro; Attendance: 54,022; Referee: Nicola Rizzoli

14 May 2017 36	Roma	3–1	Juventus	Rome
20:45 CEST (UTC+02:00)	De Rossi 25', (yellow card) 50'; Fazio (yellow card) 46'; El Shaarawy 56'; Paredes (yellow card) 60'; Nainggolan 65'	Report	Lemina 21'; Benatia (yellow card) 89'; Higuaín (yellow card) 90+2'	Stadium: Stadio Olimpico; Attendance: 53,023; Referee: Luca Banti

20 May 2017 37	Chievo	3–5	Roma	Verona
18:00 CEST (UTC+02:00)	Castro 15', (yellow card) 15'; Inglese 37', 86'; Radovanović (yellow card) 47'	Report	El Shaarawy 28', 58'; Salah 42', 76'; Džeko 83'	Stadium: Stadio Marc'Antonio Bentegodi; Attendance: 13,000; Referee: Antonio Damato

28 May 2017 38	Roma	3–2	Genoa	Rome
18:00 CEST (UTC+02:00)	Džeko 10', (yellow card) 90+5'; De Rossi 74'; Perotti 90', (yellow card) 90+2'	Report	Pellegri 3'; Lazović 79'	Stadium: Stadio Olimpico; Attendance: 59,716; Referee: Paolo Tagliavento

=== Coppa Italia ===
19 January 2017 Round of 16	Roma	4–0	Sampdoria	Rome
21:00 CET (UTC+01:00)	Nainggolan 39', 90'; Džeko 47'; El Shaarawy 61'	Report		Stadium: Stadio Olimpico; Attendance: 33,507; Referee: Gianpaolo Calvarese

1 February 2017 Quarter-finals	Roma	2–1	Cesena	Rome
20:45 CET (UTC+01:00)	Džeko 68'; Manolas (yellow card) 90+2'; Totti 90+7' (pen.)	Report	Laribi (yellow card) 43'; Garritano (yellow card) 69', (goal) 73'; Rodríguez (yellow card) 84'	Stadium: Stadio Olimpico; Attendance: 26,204; Referee: Fabio Maresca

1 March 2017 Semi-finals; First leg	Lazio	2–0	Roma	Rome
20:45 CET (UTC+01:00)	Milinković-Savić 29'; Parolo (yellow card) 41'; Strakosha (yellow card) 76'; Immobile 78'; Biglia (yellow card) 90+3'	Report	Rüdiger (yellow card) 72'	Stadium: Stadio Olimpico; Attendance: 28,000; Referee: Massimiliano Irrati

4 April 2017 Semi-finals; Second leg	Roma	3–2 (3–4 agg.)	Lazio	Rome
20:45 CEST (UTC+02:00)	Nainggolan (yellow card) 26'; Džeko (yellow card) 31'; Paredes (yellow card) 39'; El Shaarawy 43'; Salah 66', 90'; Perotti (yellow card) 74'	Report	Felipe Anderson (yellow card) 31'; Milinković-Savić 37'; Lukaku (yellow card) 48'; Immobile 56'	Stadium: Stadio Olimpico; Attendance: 43,721; Referee: Nicola Rizzoli

=== UEFA Champions League ===
==== Play-off round ====
17 August 2016 First leg	Porto (Portugal)	1–1	(Italy) Roma	Porto, Portugal
20:45 CEST (UTC+02:00)	Silva 61' (pen.); André (yellow card) 63'; M. Pereira (yellow card) 90+5'	Report	Manolas (yellow card) 14'; Felipe 21' (o.g.); Vermaelen (yellow card) 28' (yellow-red card) 41'; Strootman (yellow card) 56'; Emerson (yellow card) 60'; De Rossi (yellow card) 90+5'	Stadium: Estádio do Dragão; Attendance: 46,310; Referee: Björn Kuipers (Netherlands)

23 August 2016 Second leg	Roma (Italy)	0–3 (1–4 agg.)	(Portugal) Porto	Rome, Italy
20:45 CEST (UTC+02:00)	De Rossi (red card) 39'; Emerson (red card) 50'; Gerson (yellow card) 90'	Report	Felipe 8'; Herrera (yellow card) 14'; Otávio (yellow card) 31'; Oliveira (yellow card) 57'; Silva (yellow card) 66'; Layún 73'; Corona 75'	Stadium: Stadio Olimpico; Attendance: 39,866; Referee: Szymon Marciniak (Poland)

=== UEFA Europa League ===
==== Group stage ====
Pos	Team	Pld	W	D	L	GF	GA	GD	Pts	Qualification	ROM	AG	PLZ	AW
1	(Italy) Roma	6	3	3	0	16	7	+9	12	Advance to knockout phase	—	4–0	4–1	3–3
2	(Romania) Astra Giurgiu	6	2	2	2	7	10	−3	8	Advance to knockout phase	0–0	—	1–1	2–3
3	(Czech Republic) Viktoria Plzeň	6	1	3	2	7	10	−3	6		1–1	1–2	—	3–2
4	Austria Wien	6	1	2	3	11	14	−3	5		2–4	1–2	0–0	—

Source: UEFA
Rules for classification: Group stage tiebreakers

15 September 2016 1	Viktoria Plzeň (Czech Republic)	1–1	(Italy) Roma	Plzeň, Czech Republic
19:00 CEST (UTC+02:00)	Bakoš 11', (yellow card) 82'; Matějů (yellow card) 16'; Ďuriš (yellow card) 17'; Hořava (yellow card) 49'; Limberský (yellow card) 63'	Report	Perotti 4' (pen.); Manolas (yellow card) 21'; Juan Jesus (yellow card) 51'; Paredes (yellow card) 61'	Stadium: Doosan Arena; Attendance: 10,326; Referee: Ruddy Buquet (France)

29 September 2016 2	Roma (Italy)	4–0	(Romania) Astra Giurgiu	Rome, Italy
21:05 CEST (UTC+02:00)	Strootman 15'; Totti (yellow card) 30'; Fazio 45+2'; Fabrício 47' (o.g.); Salah 55'	Report	Alves (yellow card) 40'; Morais (yellow card) 90+4'	Stadium: Stadio Olimpico; Attendance: 13,509; Referee: Aliyar Aghayev (Azerbaijan)

20 October 2016 3	Roma (Italy)	3–3	Austria Wien	Rome, Italy
21:05 CEST (UTC+02:00)	El Shaarawy 19', 34'; Fazio (yellow card) 45+1'; Florenzi 69'; Paredes (yellow card) 90+4'	Report	Holzhauser 16'; Prokop 82'; Kayode 84'; Hadžikić (yellow card) 90+3'	Stadium: Stadio Olimpico; Attendance: 16,478; Referee: Vladislav Bezborodov (Russia)

3 November 2016 4	Austria Wien	2–4	(Italy) Roma	Vienna, Austria
19:00 CET (UTC+01:00)	Kayode 2', (yellow card) 7'; Martschinko (yellow card) 59'; Grünwald (yellow card) 77', (goal) 89'	Report	Džeko 5', 65'; De Rossi (yellow card) 12', (goal) 18'; Rüdiger (yellow card) 42'; Strootman (yellow card) 45'; Nainggolan 78'	Stadium: Ernst-Happel-Stadion; Attendance: 32,751; Referee: Xavier Estrada Fernández (Spain)

24 November 2016 5	Roma (Italy)	4–1	(Czech Republic) Viktoria Plzeň	Rome, Italy
21:05 CET (UTC+01:00)	Džeko 11', 61', 88'; Nainggolan (yellow card) 45+1'; Matějů 82' (o.g.)	Report	Zeman 18', (yellow card) 56'; Matějů (yellow card) 27'; Petržela (yellow card) 77'	Stadium: Stadio Olimpico; Attendance: 13,789; Referee: Tobias Stieler (Germany)

8 December 2016 6	Astra Giurgiu (Romania)	0–0	(Italy) Roma	Bucharest, Romania
19:00 CET (UTC+01:00)	Lovin (yellow card) 38'; Alibec (yellow card) 56'; Mansaly (yellow card) 90+4'	Report		Stadium: Arena Națională; Attendance: 7,100; Referee: Hüseyin Göçek (Turkey)

==== Knockout phase ====
===== Round of 32 =====
16 February 2017 First leg	Villarreal (Spain)	0–4	(Italy) Roma	Villarreal, Spain
21:05 CET (UTC+01:00)	Mario (yellow card) 44'	Report	Emerson 32'; Džeko 65', 79', 86'; Bruno Peres (yellow card) 89'	Stadium: El Madrigal; Attendance: 17,960; Referee: Danny Makkelie (Netherlands)

23 February 2017 Second leg	Roma (Italy)	0–1 (4–1 agg.)	(Spain) Villarreal	Rome, Italy
19:00 CET (UTC+01:00)	Rüdiger (yellow card) 57' (yellow-red card) 81'	Report	Borré 15'; Rodri (yellow card) 22'	Stadium: Stadio Olimpico; Attendance: 19,495; Referee: Felix Zwayer (Germany)

===== Round of 16 =====
9 March 2017 First leg	Lyon (France)	4–2	(Italy) Roma	Décines-Charpieu, France
21:05 CET (UTC+01:00)	Diakhaby 8'; Tolisso 47'; Tousart (yellow card) 62'; Fekir 74'; Lacazette 90+2'	Report	Salah 20'; Fazio 33'; Emerson (yellow card) 41'; Manolas (yellow card) 66'	Stadium: Parc Olympique Lyonnais; Attendance: 50,588; Referee: Anthony Taylor (England)

16 March 2017 Second leg	Roma (Italy)	2–1 (4–5 agg.)	(France) Lyon	Rome, Italy
21:05 CET (UTC+01:00)	Strootman 17', (yellow card) 39'; Manolas (yellow card) 21'; Tousart 60' (o.g.); Nainggolan (yellow card) 62'; Perotti (yellow card) 89'	Report	Diakhaby 16'; Tousart (yellow card) 28'; Mammana (yellow card) 70'; Gonalons (yellow card) 85'; Lopes (yellow card) 86'	Stadium: Stadio Olimpico; Attendance: 46,453; Referee: Viktor Kassai (Hungary)

== Statistics ==
=== Appearances and goals ===
No.	Pos	Nat	Player	Total		Serie A		Coppa Italia		Champions League		Europa League	
No.	Pos	Nat	Player	Apps	Goals	Apps	Goals	Apps	Goals	Apps	Goals	Apps	Goals
Goalkeepers
1	GK	(Poland) POL	Wojciech Szczęsny	39	0	38	0	0	0	1	0	0	0
18	GK	(Romania) ROU	Bogdan Lobonț	0	0	0	0	0	0	0	0	0	0
19	GK	(Brazil) BRA	Alisson	15	0	0	0	4	0	1	0	10	0
Defenders
2	DF	(Germany) GER	Antonio Rüdiger	35	0	25+1	0	4	0	0	0	4+1	0
3	DF	(Brazil) BRA	Juan Jesus	33	0	13+7	0	3	0	2	0	7+1	0
13	DF	(Brazil) BRA	Bruno Peres	44	2	24+6	2	3+1	0	1	0	9	0
15	DF	(Belgium) BEL	Thomas Vermaelen	12	0	4+5	0	0	0	1	0	2	0
20	DF	(Argentina) ARG	Federico Fazio	48	4	35+2	2	2	0	0+1	0	7+1	2
21	DF	(Portugal) POR	Mário Rui	9	0	3+2	0	2	0	0	0	2	0
33	DF	(Brazil) BRA	Emerson	36	1	23+2	0	2+2	0	0+2	0	4+1	1
44	DF	(Greece) GRE	Kostas Manolas	45	0	32+1	0	3	0	2	0	7	0
91	DF	(Italy) ITA	Riccardo Marchizza	1	0	0	0	0	0	0	0	0+1	0
Midfielders
4	MF	(Belgium) BEL	Radja Nainggolan	53	14	35+2	11	3+1	2	2	0	7+3	1
5	MF	(Argentina) ARG	Leandro Paredes	41	3	15+12	3	4	0	1+1	0	6+2	0
6	MF	(Netherlands) NED	Kevin Strootman	45	6	31+2	4	3	0	2	0	7	2
7	MF	(France) FRA	Clément Grenier	6	0	1+5	0	0	0	0	0	0	0
16	MF	(Italy) ITA	Daniele De Rossi	40	5	27+4	4	1	0	2	0	5+1	1
24	MF	(Italy) ITA	Alessandro Florenzi	13	1	8+1	0	0	0	1	0	1+2	1
30	MF	(Brazil) BRA	Gerson	11	0	2+2	0	0	0	0+1	0	3+3	0
Forwards
8	FW	(Argentina) ARG	Diego Perotti	45	9	20+12	8	1+3	0	2	0	4+3	1
9	FW	(Bosnia and Herzegovina) BIH	Edin Džeko	51	39	33+4	29	3+1	2	2	0	5+3	8
10	FW	(Italy) ITA	Francesco Totti	28	3	1+17	2	1+3	1	0	0	4+2	0
11	FW	(Egypt) EGY	Mohamed Salah	41	19	29+2	15	2	2	2	0	4+2	2
92	FW	(Italy) ITA	Stephan El Shaarawy	44	12	19+13	8	3+1	2	0	0	6+2	2
Players transferred out during the season
7	FW	(Paraguay) PAR	Juan Iturbe	12	0	0+5	0	0	0	0+1	0	5+1	0
17	DF	(Senegal) SEN	Moustapha Seck	1	0	0	0	0	0	0	0	1	0

Last updated: 28 May 2017
Source: Competitions

=== Goalscorers ===
Rank	No.	Pos	Nat	Name	Serie A	Coppa Italia	UEFA CL	UEFA EL	Total
1	9	FW	(Bosnia and Herzegovina)	Edin Džeko	29	2	0	8	39
2	11	FW	(Egypt)	Mohamed Salah	15	2	0	2	19
3	4	MF	(Belgium)	Radja Nainggolan	11	2	0	1	14
4	92	FW	(Italy)	Stephan El Shaarawy	8	2	0	2	12
5	8	FW	(Argentina)	Diego Perotti	8	0	0	1	9
6	6	MF	(Netherlands)	Kevin Strootman	4	0	0	2	6
7	16	MF	(Italy)	Daniele De Rossi	4	0	0	1	5
8	20	DF	(Argentina)	Federico Fazio	2	0	0	2	4
9	5	MF	(Argentina)	Leandro Paredes	3	0	0	0	3
9	10	FW	(Italy)	Francesco Totti	2	1	0	0	3
11	13	DF	(Brazil)	Bruno Peres	2	0	0	0	2
12	24	MF	(Italy)	Alessandro Florenzi	0	0	0	1	1
12	33	DF	(Brazil)	Emerson	0	0	0	1	1
Own goal					2	0	1	3	6
Totals					90	9	1	24	124

Last updated: 28 May 2017

=== Clean sheets ===
Rank	No.	Pos	Nat	Name	Serie A	Coppa Italia	UEFA CL	UEFA EL	Total
1	1	GK	(Poland)	Wojciech Szczęsny	14	0	0	0	14
2	19	GK	(Brazil)	Alisson Becker	0	1	0	3	4
Totals					14	1	0	3	18

Last updated: 28 May 2017

=== Disciplinary record ===
No.	Pos	Nat	Name	Serie A			Coppa Italia			UEFA CL			UEFA EL			Total		
No.	Pos	Nat	Name	Booked	(yellow card) (yellow-red card)	Sent off (straight red)	Booked	(yellow card) (yellow-red card)	Sent off (straight red)	Booked	(yellow card) (yellow-red card)	Sent off (straight red)	Booked	(yellow card) (yellow-red card)	Sent off (straight red)	Booked	(yellow card) (yellow-red card)	Sent off (straight red)
1	GK	(Poland)	Wojciech Szczęsny	0	0	0	0	0	0	0	0	0	0	0	0	0	0	0
18	GK	(Romania)	Bogdan Lobonț	0	0	0	0	0	0	0	0	0	0	0	0	0	0	0
19	GK	(Brazil)	Alisson Becker	0	0	0	0	0	0	0	0	0	0	0	0	0	0	0
2	DF	(Germany)	Antonio Rüdiger	7	0	1	1	0	0	0	0	0	1	1	0	9	1	1
3	DF	(Brazil)	Juan Jesus	5	0	0	0	0	0	0	0	0	1	0	0	6	0	0
13	DF	(Brazil)	Bruno Peres	3	0	0	0	0	0	0	0	0	1	0	0	4	0	0
15	DF	(Belgium)	Thomas Vermaelen	1	0	0	0	0	0	0	1	0	0	0	0	1	1	0
17	DF	(Senegal)	Moustapha Seck	0	0	0	0	0	0	0	0	0	0	0	0	0	0	0
20	DF	(Argentina)	Federico Fazio	3	0	0	0	0	0	0	0	0	1	0	0	4	0	0
21	DF	(Portugal)	Mário Rui	1	0	0	0	0	0	0	0	0	0	0	0	1	0	0
33	DF	(Brazil)	Emerson	1	0	0	0	0	0	1	0	1	1	0	0	3	0	1
44	DF	(Greece)	Kostas Manolas	7	0	0	1	0	0	1	0	0	3	0	0	12	0	0
91	DF	(Italy)	Riccardo Marchizza	0	0	0	0	0	0	0	0	0	0	0	0	0	0	0
4	MF	(Belgium)	Radja Nainggolan	2	0	0	1	0	0	0	0	0	2	0	0	5	0	0
5	MF	(Argentina)	Leandro Paredes	4	0	0	1	0	0	0	0	0	2	0	0	7	0	0
6	MF	(Netherlands)	Kevin Strootman	6	0	0	0	0	0	1	0	0	2	0	0	9	0	0
7	MF	(France)	Clément Grenier	1	0	0	0	0	0	0	0	0	0	0	0	1	0	0
16	MF	(Italy)	Daniele De Rossi	9	0	0	0	0	0	1	0	1	1	0	0	11	0	1
24	MF	(Italy)	Alessandro Florenzi	3	0	0	0	0	0	0	0	0	0	0	0	3	0	0
30	MF	(Brazil)	Gerson	1	0	0	0	0	0	1	0	0	0	0	0	2	0	0
7	FW	(Paraguay)	Juan Iturbe	0	0	0	0	0	0	0	0	0	0	0	0	0	0	0
8	FW	(Argentina)	Diego Perotti	2	0	0	1	0	0	0	0	0	1	0	0	4	0	0
9	FW	(Bosnia and Herzegovina)	Edin Džeko	4	0	0	1	0	0	0	0	0	0	0	0	5	0	0
10	FW	(Italy)	Francesco Totti	1	0	0	0	0	0	0	0	0	1	0	0	2	0	0
11	FW	(Egypt)	Mohamed Salah	2	0	0	0	0	0	0	0	0	0	0	0	2	0	0
92	FW	(Italy)	Stephan El Shaarawy	0	0	0	0	0	0	0	0	0	0	0	0	0	0	0
Totals				63	0	1	6	0	0	5	1	2	17	1	0	91	2	3

Last updated: 28 May 2017
