= Lorenzo Di Livio =

Italian footballer

Personal information
- Date of birth: 11 January 1997 (age 29)
- Place of birth: Turin, Italy
- Height: 1.79 m (5 ft 10 in)
- Position: Midfielder

Team information
- Current team: Triestina
- Number: 32

Youth career
- –2015: Roma

Senior career*
Years	Team	Apps	(Gls)
2015–2019	Roma	1	(0)
2016–2017	→ Ternana (loan)	7	(0)
2017	→ Reggina (loan)	9	(0)
2018	→ Matera (loan)	16	(1)
2018–2019	→ Siena (loan)	20	(0)
2019–2020	Catanzaro	17	(1)
2020–2021	Potenza	27	(0)
2021–2025	Latina	113	(4)
2025–2026	Campobasso	24	(0)
2026–	Triestina	0	(0)
- * Club domestic league appearances and goals as of 30 April 2026

Lorenzo Di Livio (11 January 1997) is an Italian professional footballer who plays as a midfielder for Serie D club Triestina.

== Career ==
Born in Turin, Di Livio is a youth product from Roma. He made his Serie A debut on 6 January 2016 against Chievo, replacing Mohamed Salah after 69 minutes. In August 2016 he was loaned to Serie B side Ternana.

On 11 July 2017, he was signed by Reggina. Six days later, Di Livio was suspended for doping.

On 16 July 2019, he joined Catanzaro on a three-year contract.

On 18 September 2020, Di Livio joined Serie C side Potenza.

On 28 August 2021, he signed with Latina.

== Personal life ==
His father, Angelo was also a footballer, who played as a wing-back who played for Roma, Fiorentina, Juventus, and the Italy national team, among other teams.

== Career statistics ==
As of match played 18 September 2023

Club	Season	League			National Cup		Others		Total	
Club	Season	Division	App	Goals	App	Goals	App	Goals	App	Goals
Roma	2015–16	Serie A	1	0	0	0	–		1	0
Ternana (loan)	2016–17	Serie B	7	0	–		–		7	0
Reggina (loan)	2017–18	Serie C	9	0	–		–		9	0
Matera (loan)	2017–18	Serie C	16	1	–		–		16	1
Siena (loan)	2018–19	Serie C	20	0	–		–		20	0
Catanzaro	2019–20	Serie C	17	1	2	0	2 (Note: Appearance(s) in Promotion Playoffs)	0	21	1
Potenza	2020–21	Serie C	27	0	1	0	–		28	0
Latina	2021–22	Serie C	31	1	–		–		31	1
Latina	2022–23	Serie C	29	2	0	0	–		29	2
Latina	2023–24	Serie C	2	0	0	0	–		2	0
Latina	Total		62	3	0	0	–		62	3
Total			159	5	3	0	2	0	164	5
