= 2015–16 Udinese Calcio season =

Udinese
2015–16 season
- President: Franco Soldati
- Manager: Stefano Colantuono (until 14 March 2016); Luigi De Canio (from 15 March 2016)
- Stadium: Stadio Friuli
- Serie A: 17th
- Coppa Italia: Round of 16
- Top goalscorer: League: Cyril Théréau (11); All: Cyril Théréau (12)
- Highest home attendance: 25,467 vs Juventus (17 January 2016, Serie A)
- Lowest home attendance: 2,000 vs Atalanta (2 December 2015, Coppa Italia)
- Average home league attendance: 16,209
Home colours	Away colours	Third colours

The 2015–16 season was Udinese Calcio's 36th season in Serie A and their 21st consecutive season in the top-flight. Having missed out on European football for the second consecutive season, Udinese competed only in Serie A and in the Coppa Italia. Udinese finished 17th in the league following a poor season, and were eliminated in the round of 16 in the Coppa Italia.

Following the end of the season club and Italian football legend Antonio Di Natale retired.

== Players ==
=== Squad information ===
As of 2 February 2016

Note: Flags indicate national team as defined under FIFA eligibility rules; some limited exceptions apply. Players may hold more than one non-FIFA nationality.

No.	Pos.	Nation	Player
2	DF	MLI	Molla Wagué (on loan from Granada)
5	DF	BRA	Danilo
7	MF	GHA	Emmanuel Agyemang-Badu
8	MF	POR	Bruno Fernandes
9	FW	COL	Duván Zapata (on loan from Napoli)
10	FW	ITA	Antonio Di Natale (captain)
11	DF	ITA	Maurizio Domizzi (vice-captain)
17	DF	COL	Pablo Armero
18	FW	CRO	Stipe Perica (on loan from Chelsea)
19	MF	BRA	Guilherme
20	MF	ITA	Francesco Lodi
21	DF	BRA	Edenílson
22	MF	SRB	Zdravko Kuzmanović (on loan from Basel)
26	MF	ITA	Giovanni Pasquale

No.	Pos.	Nation	Player
27	DF	SUI	Silvan Widmer
30	DF	BRA	Felipe
31	GK	GRE	Orestis Karnezis
40	GK	ITA	Samuele Perisan
52	MF	KAZ	Alexander Merkel
53	DF	IRQ	Ali Adnan Kadhim
55	MF	ISL	Emil Hallfreðsson
75	DF	FRA	Thomas Heurtaux
77	FW	FRA	Cyril Théréau
88	FW	BRA	Ryder Matos
89	DF	PAR	Iván Piris
90	GK	VEN	Rafael Romo
97	GK	ITA	Alex Meret
99	MF	CRO	Andrija Balić

== Transfers ==
=== In ===
Date	Pos.	Player	Age	Moving from	Fee	Notes	Source
1 July 2015	DF	(Iraq) Ali Adnan Kadhim	32	(Turkey) Çaykur Rizespor	Undisclosed		
1 July 2015	MF	(Brazil) Edenílson	36	(Italy) Genoa	Undisclosed		
17 July 2015	DF	(Paraguay) Iván Piris	37	(Uruguay) Deportivo Maldonado	Undisclosed	Signed until 30 June 2020	
22 July 2015	MF	(Chile) Manuel Iturra	42	(Spain) Granada	Undisclosed		
18 August 2015	MF	(Brazil) Marquinho	40	(Italy) Roma	Undisclosed		
31 August 2015	DF	(Brazil) Felipe	42	Unattached	Free		

==== Loans in ====
Date	Pos.	Player	Age	Moving from	Fee	Notes	Source
22 July 2015	FW	(Colombia) Duván Zapata	35	(Italy) Napoli	Loan	On loan until 30 June 2017	

=== Out ===
Date	Pos.	Player	Age	Moving to	Fee	Notes	Source
23 June 2015	MF	(Argentina) Roberto Pereyra	35	(Italy) Juventus	€14 million		
1 July 2015	FW	(Czech Republic) Matěj Vydra	34	(England) Watford	Undisclosed		
3 July 2015	DF	(Italy) Filippo Berra	31	(Italy) Pro Vercelli	Undisclosed		
3 July 2015	DF	(Italy) Roberto Codromaz	31	(Italy) FeralpiSalò	Undisclosed		
14 July 2015	DF	(Cameroon) Allan Nyom	38	(England) Watford	Undisclosed		
17 July 2015	DF	(Brazil) Naldo	38	(Portugal) Sporting CP	Undisclosed		

==== Loans out ====
Date	Pos.	Player	Age	Moving to	Fee	Notes	Source
17 July 2015	GK	(Serbia) Željko Brkić	40	(Italy) Carpi	Loan	On loan until 30 June 2016	
17 January 2016	DF	(Argentina) Emanuel Insúa	35	(Argentina) Newell's Old Boys	Loan		
21 January 2016	FW	(Uruguay) Nicolás López	33	(Uruguay) Nacional	Loan		
21 January 2016	MF	(Sweden) Melker Hallberg	31	(Sweden) Hammarby	Loan		
21 January 2016	MF	(Brazil) Marquinho	40	(Saudi Arabia) Al-Ahli	Loan		
21 January 2016	MF	(Brazil) Lucas Evangelista	31	(Greece) Panathinaikos	Loan		

=== Contract extensions ===
Date	Pos.	Player	Age	Fee	Notes	Source
17 July 2015	GK	(Greece) Orestis Karnezis	41	Contract Extension	Contract extended to 30 June 2019	

== Pre-season and friendlies ==
11 July 2015 Friendly	Udinese Yellow	2–0	Udinese Black-White	Udine, Italy
17:00 CEST (UTC+02:00)	Fernandes; Heurtaux	Report		Stadium: Centro Sportivo Dino Bruseschi

14 July 2015 Friendly	Udinese (Italy)	1–1	(Germany) Schalke 04	Klagenfurt am Wörthersee, Austria
20:00 CEST (UTC+02:00)	Di Natale	Report	Huntelaar	Stadium: Wörthersee Stadion

18 July 2015 Friendly	Ingolstadt 04 (Germany)	1–0	(Italy) Udinese	Lienz, Austria
18:00 CEST (UTC+02:00)	Groß 57'	Report	Fernandes (yellow card) 30'; Pinzi (yellow card) 89'	Stadium: Dolomitenstadion

22 July 2015 Friendly	Panathinaikos (Greece)	1–2	(Italy) Udinese	Athens, Greece
20:00 CEST (UTC+02:00)		Report		Stadium: Leoforos Alexandras Stadium; Referee: Michael Koukoulakis (Greece)

25 July 2015 Friendly	Galatasaray (Turkey)	v	(Italy) Udinese	Klagenfurt am Wörthersee, Austria
19:00 CEST (UTC+02:00)		Report		Stadium: Wörthersee Stadion
Note: Match was abandoned due to crowd disturbance by Galatasaray fans after 35 minutes.

1 August 2015 Friendly	Bastia (France)	3–2	(Italy) Udinese	Lignano Sabbiadoro, Italy
20:00 CEST (UTC+02:00)				Stadium: Stadio Comunale G. Teghil

== Competitions ==
=== Serie A ===
==== League table ====
Pos	Team	Pld	W	D	L	GF	GA	GD	Pts	Qualification or relegation
15	Sampdoria	38	10	10	18	48	61	−13	40	
16	Palermo	38	10	9	19	38	65	−27	39 (Note: Palermo ahead of Udinese on head-to-head points; Palermo 6 points, Udinese 0 points.)	
17	Udinese	38	10	9	19	35	60	−25	39	
18	Carpi (R)	38	9	11	18	37	57	−20	38	Relegation to Serie B
19	Frosinone (R)	38	8	7	23	35	76	−41	31	Relegation to Serie B

Source: Serie A, Soccerway
Rules for classification: 1) Points; 2) Head-to-head points; 3) Head-to-head goal difference; 4) Goal difference; 5) Goals scored; 6) Draw.
(R) Relegated

==== Results summary ====
Overall								Home						Away					
Pld	W	D	L	GF	GA	GD	Pts	W	D	L	GF	GA	GD	W	D	L	GF	GA	GD
38	10	9	19	35	60	−25	39	6	4	9	18	28	−10	4	5	10	17	32	−15

Last updated: 15 May 2016.
Source: Competitive matches

==== Results by round ====
Round	1	2	3	4	5	6	7	8	9	10	11	12	13	14	15	16	17	18	19	20	21	22	23	24	25	26	27	28	29	30	31	32	33	34	35	36	37	38
Ground	A	H	A	H	H	A	H	A	H	A	H	A	H	A	A	H	A	H	A	H	A	H	A	A	H	A	H	A	H	A	H	A	H	H	A	H	A	H
Result	W	L	L	L	L	W	D	D	W	L	D	L	W	W	L	L	W	W	L	L	L	D	D	D	L	L	W	L	L	D	W	L	D	W	L	L	D	L
Position	9	11	13	18	16	13	14	15	14	15	15	17	15	11	13	15	13	11	12	13	15	15	14	14	14	15	14	16	16	16	14	16	16	14	16	16	16	17

Updated to match(es) played on 15 May 2016. Source: Competitive matches
A = Away; H = Home; W = Win; D = Draw; L = Loss

==== Matches ====
23 August 2015 1	Juventus	0–1	Udinese	Turin
18:00 CEST (UTC+02:00)	Padoin (yellow card) 39'	Report	Piris (yellow card) 15'; Heurtaux (yellow card) 35'; Théréau 78'; Ali Adnan (yellow card) 80'	Stadium: Juventus Stadium; Attendance: 38,433; Referee: Paolo Mazzoleni

30 August 2015 2	Udinese	0–1	Palermo	Udine
20:45 CEST (UTC+02:00)	Zapata (yellow card) 44'; Merkel (yellow card) 56'; Iturra (yellow card) 78'; Fernandes (yellow card) 81'	Report	Rigoni 8'; Struna (yellow card) 44' (yellow-red card) 70'; Sorrentino (yellow card) 50'; Jajalo (yellow card) 82'	Stadium: Stadio Friuli; Attendance: 13,200; Referee: Antonio Damato

13 September 2015 3	Lazio	2–0	Udinese	Rome
18:00 CEST (UTC+02:00)	Matri 64', 73'	Report	Iturra (yellow card) 90+2'	Stadium: Stadio Olimpico; Attendance: 24,350; Referee: Gianpaolo Calvarese

19 September 2015 4	Udinese	1–2	Empoli	Udine
18:00 CEST (UTC+02:00)	Zapata 19'; Iturra (yellow card) 27'; Ali Adnan (yellow card) 30'; Kone (yellow card) 54' (yellow-red card) 72'; Fernandes (yellow card) 84'; Marquinho (yellow card) 90'	Report	Maccarone (yellow card) 38', (goal) 90+2'; Laurini (yellow card) 61'; Paredes 73'; Ronaldo (yellow card) 80'	Stadium: Stadio Friuli; Attendance: 15,000; Referee: Michael Fabbri

22 September 2015 5	Udinese	2–3	Milan	Udine
20:45 CEST (UTC+02:00)	Piris (yellow card) 31'; Iturra (yellow card) 39'; Badu 51'; Wagué (yellow card) 53'; Zapata 58'; Fernandes (yellow card) 59' (yellow-red card) 90+3'; Marquinho (yellow card) 86'	Report	Balotelli 5', (yellow card) 15'; Bonaventura 11'; Calabria (yellow card) 18'; Zapata 45+1', (yellow card) 71'	Stadium: Stadio Friuli; Attendance: 16,500; Referee: Daniele Doveri

27 September 2015 6	Bologna	1–2	Udinese	Bologna
15:00 CEST (UTC+02:00)	Mounier 31', (yellow card) 34'; Destro (yellow card) 41'; Diawara (yellow card) 50'; Masina (yellow card) 57'	Report	Ali Adnan (yellow card) 45+1'; Badu 61'; Lodi (yellow card) 66'; Zapata 85'; Pasquale (yellow card) 88'	Stadium: Stadio Renato Dall'Ara; Attendance: 15,576; Referee: Andrea Gervasoni

4 October 2015 7	Udinese	1–1	Genoa	Udine
15:00 CEST (UTC+02:00)	Edenílson (yellow card) 32'; Di Natale 47'; Danilo (yellow card) 75'	Report	Perotti 76' (pen.); Izzo (yellow card) 89'	Stadium: Stadio Friuli; Attendance: 12,704; Referee: Angelo Cervellera

18 October 2015 8	Hellas Verona	1–1	Udinese	Verona
15:00 CEST (UTC+02:00)	Pazzini 41' (pen.); Márquez (yellow card) 53'; Hallfreðsson (yellow card) 74'	Report	Wagué (yellow card) 40'; Felipe (yellow card) 67'; Théréau 84'	Stadium: Stadio Marc'Antonio Bentegodi; Attendance: 16,382; Referee: Claudio Gavillucci

25 October 2015 9	Udinese	1–0	Frosinone	Udine
15:00 CET (UTC+01:00)	Ali Adnan (yellow card) 12'; Lodi 20', (yellow card) 86'; Felipe (yellow card) 26'; Wagué (yellow card) 73'	Report	Gori (yellow card) 15'; Castillo (yellow card) 71'	Stadium: Stadio Friuli; Attendance: 13,298; Referee: Nicola Rizzoli

28 October 2015 10	Roma	3–1	Udinese	Rome
20:45 CET (UTC+01:00)	Pjanić 4'; Maicon 9'; Gervinho 63'; Vainqueur (yellow card) 90'	Report	Perica (yellow card) 37'; Iturra (yellow card) 54'; Aguirre (yellow card) 74'; Théréau 77'	Stadium: Stadio Olimpico; Attendance: 29,599; Referee: Carmine Russo

1 November 2015 11	Udinese	0–0	Sassuolo	Udine
15:00 CET (UTC+01:00)	Danilo (yellow card) 11'	Report	Missiroli (yellow card) 5'; Biondini (yellow card) 22'	Stadium: Stadio Friuli; Attendance: 13,277; Referee: Federico La Penna

8 November 2015 12	Napoli	1–0	Udinese	Naples
18:00 CET (UTC+01:00)	Koulibaly (yellow card) 42'; Higuaín 53'; Albiol (yellow card) 75'; El Kaddouri (yellow card) 90+4'	Report	Felipe (yellow card) 4'; Wagué (yellow card) 38'; Piris (yellow card) 57'	Stadium: Stadio San Paolo; Attendance: 36,144; Referee: Domenico Celi

22 November 2015 13	Udinese	1–0	Sampdoria	Udine
12:30 CET (UTC+01:00)	Iturra (yellow card) 16'; Badu 34'; Danilo (yellow card) 51'; Felipe (yellow card) 71'	Report	Silvestre (yellow card) 84'; Zukanović (red card) 90'	Stadium: Stadio Friuli; Attendance: 15,713; Referee: Marco Di Bello

29 November 2015 14	Chievo	2–3	Udinese	Verona
15:00 CET (UTC+01:00)	Paloschi 26'; Meggiorini (yellow card) 29'; Frey (yellow card) 33'; Castro (yellow card) 45+1'; Cesar (yellow card) 54'; Inglese 72'; Rigoni (yellow card) 90+1'	Report	Iturra (yellow card) 23'; Frey 43' (o.g.); Théréau 46', 81'; Danilo (yellow card) 53'	Stadium: Stadio Marc'Antonio Bentegodi; Attendance: 9,500; Referee: Andrea Gervasoni

6 December 2015 15	Fiorentina	3–0	Udinese	Florence
15:00 CET (UTC+01:00)	Badelj 27'; Gonzalo (yellow card) 29', (goal) 86'; Iličić 62' (pen.); Gilberto (yellow card) 84'	Report	Iturra (yellow card) 35'; Felipe (yellow card) 56'; Badu (yellow card) 62'; Danilo (yellow card) 70'; Edenílson (yellow card) 79'	Stadium: Stadio Artemio Franchi; Attendance: 27,021; Referee: Marco Guida

12 December 2015 16	Udinese	0–4	Internazionale	Udine
20:45 CET (UTC+01:00)	Fernandes (yellow card) 52'; Domizzi (yellow card) 66'; Marquinho (yellow card) 89'	Report	Perišić (yellow card) 8'; Telles (yellow card) 15'; Ljajić (yellow card) 21'; Icardi 23', 84'; Jovetić 31'; Brozović 87'	Stadium: Stadio Friuli; Attendance: 16,780; Referee: Davide Massa

20 December 2015 17	Torino	0–1	Udinese	Turin
15:00 CET (UTC+01:00)	Bovo (yellow card) 63'; Maxi López (yellow card) 73'	Report	Danilo (yellow card) 12'; Perica 41'; Wagué (yellow card) 53' (yellow-red card) 64'	Stadium: Stadio Olimpico di Torino; Attendance: 15,624; Referee: Claudio Gavillucci

6 January 2016 18	Udinese	2–1	Atalanta	Udine
12:30 CET (UTC+01:00)	Théréau 23'; Perica 45+2'; Felipe (yellow card) 55'; Widmer (yellow card) 68'; Zapata (yellow card) 88'	Report	De Roon (yellow card) 38'; Cigarini (yellow card) 65'; D'Alessandro 75'; Gómez (yellow card) 90+1'	Stadium: Stadio Friuli; Attendance: 13,462; Referee: Angelo Cervellera

9 January 2016 19	Carpi	2–1	Udinese	Modena
15:00 CET (UTC+01:00)	Pasciuti 26'; Lollo 70'; Suagher (yellow card) 90+3'	Report	Zapata 72'; Piris (yellow card) 78'	Stadium: Stadio Alberto Braglia; Attendance: 5,268; Referee: Michael Fabbri

17 January 2016 20	Udinese	0–4	Juventus	Udine
15:00 CET (UTC+01:00)	Badu (yellow card) 13'; Danilo (red card) 25'	Report	Chiellini (yellow card) 11'; Dybala 15', 26' (pen.); Khedira 18'; Alex Sandro 42'	Stadium: Stadio Friuli; Attendance: 25,467; Referee: Gianluca Rocchi

24 January 2016 21	Palermo	4–1	Udinese	Palermo
15:00 CET (UTC+01:00)	Chochev (yellow card) 20'; Quaison 35'; Hiljemark 56'; Jajalo (yellow card) 69'; Lazaar 77'; Trajkovski 87'	Report	Badu (yellow card) 32'; Widmer (yellow card) 44'; Felipe (yellow card) 52'; Théréau 79'	Stadium: Stadio Renzo Barbera; Attendance: 14,325; Referee: Paolo Tagliavento

31 January 2016 22	Udinese	0–0	Lazio	Udine
15:00 CET (UTC+01:00)	Théréau (yellow card) 29'; Danilo (yellow card) 31' (yellow-red card) 42'; Wagué (yellow card) 36'	Report	Đorđević (yellow card) 31'; Parolo (yellow card) 50'; Cataldi (yellow card) 66'; Matri (red card) 85'; Milinković-Savić (yellow card) 90+4'	Stadium: Stadio Friuli; Attendance: 13,611; Referee: Domenico Celi

3 February 2016 23	Empoli	1–1	Udinese	Empoli
20:45 CET (UTC+01:00)	Croce (yellow card) 58'; Mchedlidze (yellow card) 82'; Paredes (yellow card) 89'; Pucciarelli 90'	Report	Zapata (yellow card) 16', (goal) 23'; Fernandes (yellow card) 50'; Badu (yellow card) 71'; Widmer (yellow card) 82'; Kuzmanović (yellow card) 85'; Hallfreðsson (yellow card) 89'	Stadium: Stadio Carlo Castellani; Attendance: 7,581; Referee: Eugenio Abbattista

7 February 2016 24	Milan	1–1	Udinese	Milan
15:00 CET (UTC+01:00)	Montolivo (yellow card) 35'; Niang 48'	Report	Armero 17'; Badu (yellow card) 27'; Lodi (yellow card) 62'; Edenílson (yellow card) 76'	Stadium: San Siro; Attendance: 27,656; Referee: Massimiliano Irrati

14 February 2016 25	Udinese	0–1	Bologna	Udine
15:00 CET (UTC+01:00)		Report	Gastaldello (yellow card) 73'; Destro 79'	Stadium: Stadio Friuli; Attendance: 14,975; Referee: Carmine Russo

21 February 2016 26	Genoa	2–1	Udinese	Genoa
15:00 CET (UTC+01:00)	Burdisso (yellow card) 32'; Suso (yellow card) 43'; Cerci 57' (pen.); Laxalt 70'; Izzo (yellow card) 89'	Report	Ali Adnan 33'; Guilherme (yellow card) 37'; Zapata (yellow card) 56'; Hallfreðsson (yellow card) 63'	Stadium: Stadio Luigi Ferraris; Attendance: 19,061; Referee: Andrea Gervasoni

28 February 2016 27	Udinese	2–0	Hellas Verona	Udine
15:00 CET (UTC+01:00)	Badu 31'; Théréau 56'; Felipe (yellow card) 73'	Report	Pazzini (yellow card) 44'; Fares (yellow card) 60'; Bianchetti (yellow card) 67'	Stadium: Stadio Friuli; Attendance: 14,776; Referee: Daniele Doveri

6 March 2016 28	Frosinone	2–0	Udinese	Frosinone
15:00 CET (UTC+01:00)	Ciofani 12'; Paganini (yellow card) 40'; Blanchard 60', (yellow card) 73'	Report	Matos (yellow card) 59'; Théréau (yellow card) 70'; Piris (yellow card) 81'	Stadium: Stadio Matusa; Attendance: 6,510; Referee: Nicola Rizzoli

13 March 2016 29	Udinese	1–2	Roma	Udine
15:00 CET (UTC+01:00)	Fernandes 85'; Zapata (yellow card) 87'; Danilo (yellow card) 90+1'	Report	Nainggolan (yellow card) 6'; Džeko 15', (yellow card) 31'; Keita (yellow card) 17'; Florenzi 74'	Stadium: Stadio Friuli; Attendance: 17,626; Referee: Paolo Mazzoleni

20 March 2016 30	Sassuolo	1–1	Udinese	Reggio Emilia
15:00 CET (UTC+01:00)	Antei (yellow card) 13'; Politano 64'; Defrel (yellow card) 67'	Report	Zapata 8'; Heurtaux (yellow card) 9'; Hallfreðsson (yellow card) 32'; Felipe (yellow card) 83'; Danilo (yellow card) 88'	Stadium: Mapei Stadium – Città del Tricolore; Attendance: 10,344; Referee: Marco Di Bello

3 April 2016 31	Udinese	3–1	Napoli	Udine
12:30 CEST (UTC+02:00)	Fernandes 14' (pen.), 45+1', (yellow card) 79'; Heurtaux (yellow card) 23'; Kuzmanović (yellow card) 38'; Théréau 57'; Widmer (yellow card) 80'	Report	Koulibaly (yellow card) 13'; Higuaín 24', (yellow card) 61' (yellow-red card) 75'; Ghoulam (yellow card) 25'; Jorginho (yellow card) 62'; Mertens (yellow card) 83'	Stadium: Stadio Friuli; Attendance: 20,162; Referee: Massimiliano Irrati

10 April 2016 32	Sampdoria	2–0	Udinese	Genoa
15:00 CEST (UTC+02:00)	Moisander (yellow card) 43'; Muriel (yellow card) 46'; Armero 58' (o.g.); Diakité (yellow card) 67'; Ranocchia (yellow card) 73'; Fernando 85'	Report	Kuzmanović (yellow card) 39'	Stadium: Stadio Luigi Ferraris; Attendance: 20,615; Referee: Carmine Russo

17 April 2016 33	Udinese	0–0	Chievo	Udine
15:00 CEST (UTC+02:00)	Kuzmanović (yellow card) 11'; Felipe (red card) 77'; Fernandes (yellow card) 83'	Report	Cesar (yellow card) 58'; Cacciatore (yellow card) 59'; Radovanović (yellow card) 77'; Spolli (yellow card) 82'; Meggiorini (red card) 85'	Stadium: Stadio Friuli; Attendance: 15,785; Referee: Claudio Gavillucci

20 April 2016 34	Udinese	2–1	Fiorentina	Udine
20:45 CEST (UTC+02:00)	Zapata 2'; Ali Adnan (yellow card) 40'; Théréau 53'; Fernandes (yellow card) 76'	Report	Tomović (yellow card) 10'; Zárate 23'; Badelj (yellow card) 34'; Roncaglia (yellow card) 50'; Alonso (yellow card) 87'	Stadium: Stadio Friuli; Attendance: 18,483; Referee: Davide Massa

23 April 2016 35	Internazionale	3–1	Udinese	Milan
20:45 CEST (UTC+02:00)	Jovetić (yellow card) 31', (goal) 36', 75'; Kondogbia (yellow card) 65'; Perišić (yellow card) 82'; Éder 90+5'	Report	Théréau 9'; Danilo (yellow card) 61'; Zapata (yellow card) 86'	Stadium: San Siro; Attendance: 48,012; Referee: Domenico Celi

30 April 2016 36	Udinese	1–5	Torino	Udine
18:00 CEST (UTC+02:00)	Heurtaux (yellow card) 43'; Felipe 47', (yellow card) 88'	Report	Jansson 12'; Bovo (yellow card) 37'; Acquah 45'; Martínez 50', 83'; Belotti 56'; Silva (yellow card) 61'	Stadium: Stadio Friuli; Attendance: 16,699; Referee: Maurizio Mariani

8 May 2016 37	Atalanta	1–1	Udinese	Bergamo
15:00 CEST (UTC+02:00)	Bellini 19' (pen.); Brivio (yellow card) 33'	Report	Zapata 10'; Kuzmanović (yellow card) 37'; Ali Adnan (yellow card) 45+3'	Stadium: Stadio Atleti Azzurri d'Italia; Attendance: 19,380; Referee: Nicola Rizzoli

15 May 2016 38	Udinese	1–2	Carpi	Udine
15:00 CEST (UTC+02:00)	Théréau (red card) 37'; Felipe (yellow card) 59'; Badu (yellow card) 73'; Di Natale 79' (pen.); Pasquale (yellow card) 90+4'	Report	Gagliolo (yellow card) 8'; Verdi 36' (pen.), 38'; Crimi (yellow card) 42'; Suagher (yellow card) 60'	Stadium: Stadio Friuli; Attendance: 20,456; Referee: Paolo Mazzoleni

=== Coppa Italia ===
16 August 2015 Third round	Udinese	3–1	Novara	Udine
18:30 CEST (UTC+02:00)	Guilherme 29'; Théréau 31'; Edenílson 78'	Report	Buzzegoli 73'	Stadium: Stadio Friuli; Attendance: 9,000; Referee: Daniele Chiffi

2 December 2015 Fourth round	Udinese	3–1	Atalanta	Udine
21:00 CET (UTC+01:00)	Di Natale 5' (pen.), 76'; Marquinho (yellow card) 22'; Perica 57'; Fernandes (yellow card) 64'; Insúa (yellow card) 87'	Report	Estigarribia (yellow card) 36'; Monachello 48'; Stendardo (yellow card) 54'; Grassi (yellow card) 64'	Stadium: Stadio Friuli; Attendance: 2,000; Referee: Riccardo Pinzani

17 December 2015 Round of 16	Lazio	2–1	Udinese	Rome
16:00 CET (UTC+01:00)	Matri 70'; Cataldi 79', (yellow card) 80'	Report	Ali Adnan (yellow card) 59'; Kone 67'	Stadium: Stadio Olimpico; Attendance: 1,970; Referee: Antonio Damato

== Statistics ==
=== Appearances and goals ===
No.	Pos	Nat	Player	Total		Serie A		Coppa Italia	
No.	Pos	Nat	Player	Apps	Goals	Apps	Goals	Apps	Goals
Goalkeepers
31	GK	(Greece) GRE	Orestis Karnezis	39	0	38	0	1	0
40	GK	(Italy) ITA	Samuele Perisan	0	0	0	0	0	0
90	GK	(Venezuela) VEN	Rafael Romo	0	0	0	0	0	0
97	GK	(Italy) ITA	Alex Meret	2	0	0	0	2	0
Defenders
2	DF	(Mali) MLI	Molla Wagué	21	0	20+1	0	0	0
5	DF	(Brazil) BRA	Danilo	37	0	34	0	2+1	0
11	DF	(Italy) ITA	Maurizio Domizzi	7	0	3+2	0	2	0
17	DF	(Colombia) COL	Pablo Armero	5	1	5	1	0	0
21	DF	(Brazil) BRA	Edenílson	30	1	26+3	0	1	1
27	DF	(Switzerland) SUI	Silvan Widmer	28	0	21+6	0	1	0
30	DF	(Brazil) BRA	Felipe	27	1	26	1	0+1	0
53	DF	(Iraq) IRQ	Ali Adnan Kadhim	31	1	22+6	1	3	0
75	DF	(France) FRA	Thomas Heurtaux	16	0	10+5	0	1	0
89	DF	(Paraguay) PAR	Iván Piris	29	0	21+6	0	2	0
Midfielders
7	MF	(Ghana) GHA	Emmanuel Agyemang-Badu	34	4	30+3	4	1	0
8	MF	(Portugal) POR	Bruno Fernandes	33	3	24+7	3	2	0
19	MF	(Brazil) BRA	Guilherme	7	1	4+1	0	2	1
20	MF	(Italy) ITA	Francesco Lodi	24	1	20+4	1	0	0
22	MF	(Serbia) SRB	Zdravko Kuzmanović	16	0	13+3	0	0	0
26	MF	(Italy) ITA	Giovanni Pasquale	8	0	2+4	0	2	0
41	MF	(Italy) ITA	Simone Pontisso	1	0	0	0	1	0
52	MF	(Kazakhstan) KAZ	Alexander Merkel	1	0	1	0	0	0
55	MF	(Iceland) ISL	Emil Hallfreðsson	11	0	7+4	0	0	0
99	MF	(Croatia) CRO	Andrija Balić	0	0	0	0	0	0
Forwards
9	FW	(Colombia) COL	Duván Zapata	26	8	15+10	8	0+1	0
10	FW	(Italy) ITA	Antonio Di Natale	25	4	12+11	2	2	2
18	FW	(Croatia) CRO	Stipe Perica	13	3	5+6	2	2	1
77	FW	(France) FRA	Cyril Théréau	37	12	34+2	11	1	1
88	FW	(Brazil) BRA	Ryder Matos	11	0	4+7	0	0	0
Players transferred out during the season
13	DF	(Argentina) ARG	Emanuel Insúa	1	0	0	0	1	0
16	MF	(Chile) CHI	Manuel Iturra	19	0	14+3	0	1+1	0
23	MF	(Brazil) BRA	Marquinho	13	0	4+7	0	2	0
33	MF	(Greece) GRE	Panagiotis Kone	7	1	2+3	0	0+2	1
74	FW	(Uruguay) URU	Rodrigo Aguirre	12	0	3+7	0	0+2	0
95	MF	(Brazil) BRA	Lucas Evangelista	2	0	0	0	1+1	0

Last updated: 15 May 2016
Source: Competitions

=== Goalscorers ===
Rank	No.	Pos	Nat	Name	Serie A	Coppa Italia	Total
1	77	FW	(France)	Cyril Théréau	11	1	12
2	9	FW	(Colombia)	Duván Zapata	8	0	8
3	7	MF	(Ghana)	Emmanuel Agyemang-Badu	4	0	4
3	10	FW	(Italy)	Antonio Di Natale	2	2	4
5	8	MF	(Portugal)	Bruno Fernandes	3	0	3
5	18	FW	(Croatia)	Stipe Perica	2	1	3
7	17	DF	(Colombia)	Pablo Armero	1	0	1
7	19	MF	(Brazil)	Guilherme	0	1	1
7	20	MF	(Italy)	Francesco Lodi	1	0	1
7	21	DF	(Brazil)	Edenílson	0	1	1
7	30	DF	(Brazil)	Felipe	1	0	1
7	33	MF	(Greece)	Panagiotis Kone	0	1	1
7	53	DF	(Iraq)	Ali Adnan Kadhim	1	0	1
Own goal					1	0	0
Totals					35	7	42

Last updated: 15 May 2016

=== Clean sheets ===
Rank	No.	Pos	Nat	Name	Serie A	Coppa Italia	Total
1	31	GK	(Greece)	Orestis Karnezis	8	0	8
Totals					8	0	8

Last updated: 15 May 2016
