= 2012–13 AS Roma season =

Roma
2012–13 season
- President: James Pallotta
- Manager: Zdeněk Zeman (until 2 February 2013); Aurelio Andreazzoli (caretaker, from 2 February 2013)
- Stadium: Stadio Olimpico
- Serie A: 6th
- Coppa Italia: Runners-up
- Top goalscorer: League: Dani Osvaldo (16); All: Dani Osvaldo (17)
- Highest home attendance: 54,981 vs Juventus (17 February 2013, Serie A)
- Lowest home attendance: 9,769 vs Atalanta (11 December 2012, Coppa Italia)
- Average home league attendance: 40,179
Home colours	Away colours	Third colours

The 2012–13 season was Associazione Sportiva Roma's 85th in existence and 84th season in the top flight of Italian football. The pre-season started with the June hiring of former manager Zdeněk Zeman. Zeman replaced Luis Enrique who resigned at the end of the 2011–12 season. Enrique's lone season reign saw the disappointing loss to Slovan Bratislava in the Europa League as well as the inability to qualify for international competitions for the 2012–13 season. Roma eventually finished 7th, losing the Europa League chase to rivals Lazio, Napoli and Internazionale.

Zeman brought back his high-scoring 4–3–3 formation and his hard working ethic which successfully guided former team Pescara to the Serie A. He was, however, sacked on 2 February 2013. Roma also competed in the Coppa Italia, where they started in the round of 16.

== Players ==
=== Squad information ===
Last updated on 19 May 2013
Appearances include league matches only

No.	Name	Nat	Position(s)	Date of birth (Age at end of season)	Signed from	Signed in	Apps.	Goals
Goalkeepers
1	Bogdan Lobonț	(Romania)	GK	18 January 1978 (aged 35)	(Romania) Dinamo București	2009	28	0
13	Mauro Goicoechea	(Uruguay)	GK	27 March 1988 (aged 25)	(Uruguay) Danubio	2012	15	0
24	Maarten Stekelenburg	(Netherlands)	GK	22 September 1982 (aged 30)	(Netherlands) Ajax	2011	48	0
55	Tomas Švedkauskas	(Lithuania)	GK	22 June 1994 (aged 19)	(Italy) Fiorentina	2012	0	0
Defenders
3	Marquinhos	(Brazil)	CB	14 May 1994 (aged 19)	(Brazil) Corinthians	2012	26	0
5	Leandro Castán	(Brazil)	CB	5 November 1986 (aged 26)	(Brazil) Corinthians	2012	30	1
23	Iván Piris	(Paraguay)	RB	10 March 1989 (aged 24)	(Brazil) São Paulo	2012	29	0
27	Dodô	(Brazil)	LB	6 February 1992 (aged 21)	(Brazil) Corinthians	2012	11	0
29	Nicolás Burdisso	(Argentina)	CB / RB	12 April 1981 (aged 32)	(Italy) Internazionale	2009	96	6
35	Vasilis Torosidis	(Greece)	RB / LB	10 June 1985 (aged 28)	(Greece) Olympiacos	2013	11	1
42	Federico Balzaretti	(Italy)	LB	6 December 1981 (aged 31)	(Italy) Palermo	2012	27	0
46	Alessio Romagnoli	(Italy)	CB	12 January 1995 (aged 18)	(Italy) Youth Sector	2012	2	1
Midfielders
4	Michael Bradley	(United States)	DM / CM	31 July 1987 (aged 25)	(Italy) Chievo	2012	30	1
7	Marquinho	(Brazil)	AM	3 July 1986 (aged 26)	(Brazil) Fluminense	2012	41	7
8	Erik Lamela	(Argentina)	AM	4 March 1992 (aged 21)	(Argentina) River Plate	2011	62	19
11	Rodrigo Taddei	(Brazil)	LM / RM / AM	6 March 1980 (aged 33)	(Italy) Siena	2005	205	23
15	Miralem Pjanić	(Bosnia and Herzegovina)	CM / AM	2 March 1990 (aged 23)	(France) Lyon	2011	57	6
16	Daniele De Rossi (Vice-Captain)	(Italy)	DM / CM	24 July 1983 (aged 29)	(Italy) Youth Sector	2001	306	33
20	Simone Perrotta	(Italy)	LM / CM / AM	17 September 1977 (aged 35)	(Italy) Chievo	2004	246	36
48	Alessandro Florenzi	(Italy)	RB / CM / RW	11 March 1991 (aged 22)	(Italy) Youth Sector	2011	37	3
77	Panagiotis Tachtsidis	(Greece)	CM	15 February 1991 (aged 22)	(Greece) AEK Athens	2012	21	1
Forwards
9	Dani Osvaldo	(Italy)	CF / ST	12 January 1986 (aged 27)	(Spain) Espanyol	2011	55	27
10	Francesco Totti (Captain)	(Italy)	AM / LW / SS / CF / ST	27 September 1976 (aged 36)	(Italy) Youth Sector	1992	535	227
17	Nicolás López	(Uruguay)	CF / ST	1 October 1993 (aged 19)	(Uruguay) Nacional	2012	6	1
22	Mattia Destro	(Italy)	CF / ST	20 March 1991 (aged 22)	(Italy) Siena	2012	21	6
Players transferred during the season

== Transfers ==
=== In ===
Date	Pos.	Name	From	Fee
3 July 2012	DF	(Brazil) Dodô	(Brazil) Corinthians	Undisclosed
18 July 2012	DF	(Brazil) Leandro Castán	(Brazil) Corinthians	€5.5M
1 August 2012	DF	(Italy) Federico Balzaretti	(Italy) Palermo	€4.5M
15 July 2012	MF	(United States) Michael Bradley	(Italy) Chievo	€3.75M
19 July 2012	MF	(Greece) Panagiotis Tachtsidis	(Italy) Genoa	€2.5M
22 January 2013	DF	(Greece) Vasilis Torosidis	(Greece) Olympiacos	€0.5M

Total spending: ▼€16.75M

==== Loans in ====
Date	Pos.	Name	From	Fee
1 August 2012	DF	(Paraguay) Iván Piris	(Paraguay) Cerro Porteño	€1M
30 July 2012	FW	(Italy) Mattia Destro	(Italy) Genoa	€11.5M

Total spending: ▼€12.5M

=== Out ===
Date	Pos.	Name	To	Fee
17 July 2012	DF	(Brazil) Juan	(Brazil) Internacional	Free
22 June 2012	DF	(Brazil) Cicinho	(Brazil) Sport Recife	Free
22 June 2012	MF	(Italy) Gianluca Caprari	(Italy) Pescara	Co-ownership
15 July 2012	MF	(Romania) Adrian Stoian	(Italy) Chievo	€0.5M
19 July 2012	MF	(Italy) Andrea Bertolacci	(Italy) Genoa	€1.2M
27 July 2012	MF	(Brazil) Fábio Simplício	(Japan) Cerezo Osaka	Free
13 July 2012	FW	(Italy) Fabio Borini	(England) Liverpool	€13.3M
30 July 2012	FW	(Italy) Giammario Piscitella	(Italy) Genoa	€1.5M
30 July 2012	MF	(Italy) Valerio Verre	(Italy) Siena	€1.5M
9 August 2012	MF	(Chile) David Pizarro	(Italy) Fiorentina	Undisclosed
11 August 2012	DF	(Argentina) Gabriel Heinze	(Argentina) Newell's Old Boys	Free
20 August 2012	FW	(Italy) Stefano Okaka	(Italy) Parma	Undisclosed

Total income: ▲€18M

Net Income: ▲€1.25M

==== Loans out ====
Date	Pos.	Name	To	Fee
6 July 2012	GK	(Italy) Gianluca Curci	(Italy) Bologna	Undisclosed
2 August 2012	DF	(Italy) Alessandro Crescenzi	(Italy) Pescara	€0.2M
8 August 2012	DF	(Italy) Paolo Frascatore	(Italy) Sassuolo	Undisclosed
3 August 2012	DF	(Spain) José Ángel	(Spain) Real Sociedad	Undisclosed
9 August 2012	DF	(Italy) Simone Sini	(Italy) Pro Vercelli	Undisclosed
11 August 2012	MF	(Italy) Matteo Brighi	(Italy) Torino	Undisclosed
6 July 2012	MF	(Italy) Federico Viviani	(Italy) Padova	Undisclosed
9 July 2012	FW	(Italy) Marco D'Alessandro	(Italy) Cesena	Undisclosed
7 August 2012	FW	(Italy) Filippo Scardina	(Italy) Gubbio	Undisclosed
29 August 2012	FW	(Spain) Bojan Krkić	(Italy) Milan	€0.25M
31 August 2012	FW	(Italy) Marco Borriello	(Italy) Genoa	€0.25M

Total income: ▲€0.7M

Net Income: ▼€11.8M

== Pre-season and friendlies ==
8 July 2012 Friendly	Roma (Italy)	9–0	(Italy) Sel. Val Pusteria	Brunico, Italy
16:00 CEST (UTC+02:00)	Pjanić 6', 19'; Totti 14'; Florenzi 25'; Osvaldo 43'; Marquinho 64'; Bojan 73'; Borriello 82'; Simplício 88'

14 July 2012 Friendly	Roma (Italy)	2–0	(Romania) Turnu Severin	Brunico, Italy
	Burdisso 42'; López 65'

17 July 2012 Friendly	Rapid Wien (Austria)	1–2	(Italy) Roma	Vienna, Austria
17:00 CEST (UTC+02:00)	Boyd 28'		Pjanić 13'; Pizarro 51'	Stadium: Gerhard Hanappi Stadium

22 July 2012 Friendly	Zagłębie Lubin (Poland)	0–4	(Italy) Roma	Chicago, Illinois, United States
14:30 CDT (UTC−05:00)			Osvaldo 1'; Tachtsidis 19'; Lamela 30'; Bojan 43'	Stadium: Wrigley Field

25 July 2012 Friendly	Liverpool (England)	1–2	(Italy) Roma	Boston, Massachusetts, United States
18:30 EDT (UTC−04:00)	Adam 79'		Bradley 62'; Florenzi 68'	Stadium: Fenway Park

27 July 2012 Friendly	El Salvador	1–2	(Italy) Roma	Harrison, New Jersey, United States
20:00 EDT (UTC−04:00)	Gutiérrez 49'		Osvaldo 2'; Bojan 62'	Stadium: Red Bull Arena

5 August 2012 Friendly	Irdning (Austria)	0–13	(Italy) Roma	Irdning, Austria
19:30 CEST (UTC+02:00)			Totti 4'; Destro 11', 22'; Balzaretti 20'; López 32'; Florenzi 35'; Pjanić 51'; Lamela 57', 66', 86'; Osvaldo 68', 89'; Marquinho 80'

11 August 2012 Friendly	SC Liezen (Austria)	0–6	(Italy) Roma	Irdning, Austria
18:00 CEST (UTC+02:00)			Destro 9', 19', 61'; Osvaldo 20' (pen.), 79'; López 68'

19 August 2012 Friendly	Roma (Italy)	3–0	(Greece) Aris	Rome, Italy
20:45 CEST (UTC+02:00)	Osvaldo 25'; Bradley 71'; Destro 86'			Stadium: Stadio Olimpico

2 January 2013 Friendly	Orlando City (United States)	0–5	(Italy) Roma	Winter Park, Florida, United States
12:30 EST (UTC−05:00)			Lamela 2', 13'; Pjanić 31'; Destro 45'; Florenzi 65'	Stadium: Cahall-Sandspur Field, Rollins College

== Competitions ==
=== Overall ===
Competition	Started round	Final position	First match	Last match
Serie A	Matchday 1	6th	26 August 2012	19 May 2013
Coppa Italia	Round of 16	Runners-up	11 December 2012	26 May 2013

Last updated: 26 May 2013

=== Serie A ===
==== League table ====
Pos	Team	Pld	W	D	L	GF	GA	GD	Pts	Qualification or relegation
4	Fiorentina	38	21	7	10	72	44	+28	70	Qualification for the Europa League play-off round
5	Udinese	38	18	12	8	59	45	+14	66	Qualification for the Europa League third qualifying round
6	Roma	38	18	8	12	71	56	+15	62	
7	Lazio	38	18	7	13	51	42	+9	61	Qualification for the Europa League group stage (Note: Lazio qualified for the 2013–14 UEFA Europa League group stage after winning 2012–13 Coppa Italia.)
8	Catania	38	15	11	12	50	46	+4	56	

Source: Serie A, Soccerway
Rules for classification: 1st points; 2nd head-to-head points; 3rd head-to-head goal difference; 4th goal difference; 5th number of goals scored; 6th public draw.
(Head-to-head record is applied for clubs with the same number of points only once all matches between said clubs have been played)

==== Results summary ====
Overall								Home						Away					
Pld	W	D	L	GF	GA	GD	Pts	W	D	L	GF	GA	GD	W	D	L	GF	GA	GD
38	18	8	12	71	56	+15	62	10	5	4	40	24	+16	8	3	8	31	32	−1

Last updated: 19 May 2013.
Source: Competitive matches

==== Results by round ====
Round	1	2	3	4	5	6	7	8	9	10	11	12	13	14	15	16	17	18	19	20	21	22	23	24	25	26	27	28	29	30	31	32	33	34	35	36	37	38
Ground	H	A	H	A	H	A	H	A	H	A	H	A	H	A	A	H	A	H	A	A	H	A	H	A	H	A	H	A	H	A	H	A	H	H	A	H	A	H
Result	D	W	L	W	D	L	W	W	L	L	W	L	W	W	W	W	L	W	L	L	D	D	L	L	W	W	W	D	W	L	D	W	D	W	W	L	D	W
Position	10	5	7	5	6	7	6	5	6	7	6	7	6	6	6	5	6	6	6	6	7	8	8	9	8	8	7	7	5	7	7	6	6	5	5	7	7	6

Updated to match(es) played on 19 May 2013. Source: Competitive matches
A = Away; H = Home; W = Win; D = Draw; L = Loss

==== Matches ====
26 August 2012 1	Roma	2–2	Catania	Rome
20:45 CEST (UTC+02:00)	Bradley (yellow card) 12'; Burdisso (yellow card) 28'; Osvaldo 59'; Marquinho (yellow card) 86'; López 90+1'	Report	Marchese 29', (yellow card) 90+4'; Gómez 69'; Álvarez (yellow card) 81'	Stadium: Stadio Olimpico; Attendance: 45,000; Referee: Andrea De Marco

2 September 2012 2	Internazionale	1–3	Roma	Milan
20:45 CEST (UTC+02:00)	Guarín (yellow card) 33'; Cassano 45+2'; Ranocchia (yellow card) 47'	Report	Florenzi 15'; Destro (yellow card) 17'; Osvaldo (yellow card) 66' (yellow-red card) 90+1', (goal) 67'; Stekelenburg (yellow card) 77'; Marquinho 81'	Stadium: San Siro; Attendance: 43,435; Referee: Mauro Bergonzi

16 September 2012 3	Roma	2–3	Bologna	Rome
15:00 CEST (UTC+02:00)	Florenzi 6'; Lamela 16'; Pjanić (yellow card) 25'; Tachtsidis (yellow card) 31'; Castán (yellow card) 35'; Balzaretti (yellow card) 51'; Totti (yellow card) 87'	Report	Pérez (yellow card) 17'; Morleo (yellow card) 68'; Gilardino 72', 90+1'; Diamanti 73', (yellow card) 88'	Stadium: Stadio Olimpico; Attendance: 37,000; Referee: Marco Guida

23 September 2012 4	Cagliari	0–3 (Awarded)	Roma	Quartu Sant'Elena
15:00 CEST (UTC+02:00)		Report		Stadium: Stadio Is Arenas

26 September 2012 5	Roma	1–1	Sampdoria	Rome
20:45 CEST (UTC+02:00)	Taddei (yellow card) 11'; Totti 35'; Lamela (yellow card) 65'; Florenzi (yellow card) 67'	Report	Maresca (yellow card) 23' (yellow-red card) 46'; Munari 62'	Stadium: Stadio Olimpico; Attendance: 37,125; Referee: Paolo Mazzoleni

30 September 2012 6	Juventus	4–1	Roma	Turin
20:45 CEST (UTC+02:00)	Pirlo 11'; Vidal 16' (pen.), (yellow card) 81'; Matri 19', (yellow card) 71'; Bonucci (yellow card) 68'; Vučinić (yellow card) 89'; Giovinco 90'	Report	Taddei (yellow card) 10'; Castán (yellow card) 15'; Burdisso (yellow card) 20'; Balzaretti (yellow card) 28'; Osvaldo 69' (pen.)	Stadium: Juventus Stadium; Attendance: 39,221; Referee: Nicola Rizzoli

7 October 2012 7	Roma	2–0	Atalanta	Rome
12:30 CEST (UTC+02:00)	Lamela 30'; Tachtsidis (yellow card) 36'; Florenzi (yellow card) 56'; Bradley 62'	Report	Peluso (yellow card) 7'; Cigarini (yellow card) 67'; Cazzola (yellow card) 70'	Stadium: Stadio Olimpico; Attendance: 40,155; Referee: Luca Banti

21 October 2012 8	Genoa	2–4	Roma	Genoa
20:45 CEST (UTC+02:00)	Kucka 7'; Janković 16'; Seymour (yellow card) 60'; Canini (yellow card) 69'; Granqvist (yellow card) 72'; Borriello (yellow card) 72'	Report	Totti 27'; Osvaldo 44', 56'; De Rossi (yellow card) 59'; Lamela 83'	Stadium: Stadio Luigi Ferraris; Attendance: 21,000; Referee: Daniele Orsato

28 October 2012 9	Roma	2–3	Udinese	Rome
19:45 CEST (UTC+02:00)	Lamela 22', 24', (yellow card) 54'; Osvaldo (yellow card) 50'; Castán (yellow card) 86'; Tachtsidis (yellow card) 90+3' (red card) 90+3'	Report	Domizzi 32'; Angella (yellow card) 35'; Domizzi (yellow card) 44'; Di Natale 50', 88' (pen.); Armero (yellow card) 82'; Badu (yellow card) 90+3'	Stadium: Stadio Olimpico; Attendance: 36,470; Referee: Davide Massa

31 October 2012 10	Parma	3–2	Roma	Parma
20:45 CET (UTC+01:00)	Belfodil 34', (yellow card) 53' (yellow-red card) 85'; Parolo 37'; Zaccardo 65'; Mirante (yellow card) 84'	Report	Lamela 8'; Osvaldo (yellow card) 50'; Totti 71'	Stadium: Stadio Ennio Tardini; Attendance: 12,077; Referee: Antonio Damato

4 November 2012 11	Roma	4–1	Palermo	Rome
20:45 CET (UTC+01:00)	Totti 11'; Osvaldo 31'; Lamela 69'; Destro (yellow card) 77' (yellow-red card) 80', (goal) 79'; Burdisso (yellow card) 85'	Report	Pisano (yellow card) 5'; Iličić 82'; Muñoz (yellow card) 88'	Stadium: Stadio Olimpico; Attendance: 30,598; Referee: Andrea De Marco

11 November 2012 12	Lazio	3–2	Roma	Rome
15:00 CET (UTC+01:00)	Klose (yellow card) 18', (goal) 43'; Candreva 35', (yellow card) 45+2'; Lulić (yellow card) 39'; Mauri 47', (yellow card) 58' (yellow-red card) 85'	Report	Lamela 9'; Bradley (yellow card) 25'; Burdisso (yellow card) 33'; De Rossi (red card) 45+2'; Tachtsidis (yellow card) 79'; Pjanić 86'; Marquinho (yellow card) 89'	Stadium: Stadio Olimpico; Attendance: 51,461; Referee: Gianluca Rocchi

19 November 2012 13	Roma	2–0	Torino	Rome
20:45 CET (UTC+01:00)	Piris (yellow card) 34'; Osvaldo 71' (pen.); Lamela (yellow card) 78'; Pjanić 86', (yellow card) 87'	Report	Bianchi (yellow card) 26'; Sgrigna (yellow card) 56'; Ogbonna (yellow card) 62'; D'Ambrosio (yellow card) 72'	Stadium: Stadio Olimpico; Attendance: 33,955; Referee: Marco Guida

25 November 2012 14	Pescara	0–1	Roma	Pescara
15:00 CET (UTC+01:00)	Soddimo (yellow card) 75'; Weiss (yellow card) 79'; Balzano (yellow card) 90+3'	Report	Destro 5'; Bradley (yellow card) 62'; Pjanić (yellow card) 79'	Stadium: Stadio Adriatico; Attendance: 13,445; Referee: Andrea Gervasoni

2 December 2012 15	Siena	1–3	Roma	Siena
15:00 CET (UTC+01:00)	Neto 25'; D'Agostino (yellow card) 78'	Report	Tachtsidis (yellow card) 56'; Destro 63', 90+1', (yellow card) 66'; Perrotta 86'	Stadium: Stadio Artemio Franchi – Montepaschi Arena; Attendance: 10,291; Referee: Paolo Mazzoleni

8 December 2012 16	Roma	4–2	Fiorentina	Rome
20:45 CET (UTC+01:00)	Castán 7'; Totti 19', 45+1'; Tachtsidis (yellow card) 22'; Osvaldo 89'	Report	Roncaglia 14', (yellow card) 81'; Olivera (yellow card) 22'; Cassani (yellow card) 35'; El Hamdaoui 46'; Gonzalo (yellow card) 69'; Cuadrado (yellow card) 72'	Stadium: Stadio Olimpico; Attendance: 41,689; Referee: Luca Banti

16 December 2012 17	Chievo	1–0	Roma	Verona
15:00 CET (UTC+01:00)	L. Rigoni (yellow card) 28'; Pellissier 87'; M. Rigoni (yellow card) 90+2'	Report	Castán (yellow card) 24'; Totti (yellow card) 62'	Stadium: Stadio Marc'Antonio Bentegodi; Attendance: 9,000; Referee: Mauro Bergonzi

22 December 2012 18	Roma	4–2	Milan	Rome
20:45 CET (UTC+01:00)	Burdisso 13', (yellow card) 54'; Osvaldo 23'; Lamela 30', 61'; Marquinhos (red card) 78'; Goicoechea (yellow card) 86'	Report	Yepes (yellow card) 15'; Ambrosini (yellow card) 58'; Mexès (yellow card) 81'; Pazzini 87' (pen.); Bojan 88'	Stadium: Stadio Olimpico; Attendance: 50,206; Referee: Gianluca Rocchi

6 January 2013 19	Napoli	4–1	Roma	Naples
20:45 CET (UTC+01:00)	Cavani 4', 48', 70'; Campagnaro (yellow card) 22'; De Sanctis (yellow card) 31'; Maggio 90+1', (yellow card) 90+1'	Report	Pjanić (yellow card) 19' (yellow-red card) 74'; Totti (yellow card) 25'; Osvaldo 72'	Stadium: Stadio San Paolo; Attendance: 42,091; Referee: Paolo Tagliavento

13 January 2013 20	Catania	1–0	Roma	Catania
15:00 CET (UTC+01:00)	Bellusci (yellow card) 17'; Gómez 61'; Legrottaglie (yellow card) 65'; Marchese (yellow card) 68'; Bergessio (yellow card) 72'	Report	Balzaretti (yellow card) 8'; Destro (yellow card) 14'; Castán (yellow card) 64'	Stadium: Stadio Angelo Massimino; Attendance: 13,614; Referee: Antonio Damato

20 January 2013 21	Roma	1–1	Internazionale	Rome
20:45 CET (UTC+01:00)	Totti 22' (pen.); Lamela (yellow card) 23'; Osvaldo (yellow card) 42'; De Rossi (yellow card) 44'	Report	Ranocchia (yellow card) 25'; Palacio 45+1'; Pereira (yellow card) 50'; Chivu (yellow card) 63'; Juan Jesus (yellow card) 76'; Handanović (yellow card) 78'; Rocchi (yellow card) 90'	Stadium: Stadio Olimpico; Attendance: 42,052; Referee: Daniele Orsato

27 January 2013 22	Bologna	3–3	Roma	Bologna
12:30 CET (UTC+01:00)	Motta (yellow card) 5'; Gilardino 17'; Gabbiadini 26'; Kone (yellow card) 42'; Pasquato 54'; Pérez (yellow card) 64'; Morleo (yellow card) 69'; Sørensen (yellow card) 77'	Report	Florenzi 9'; Piris (yellow card) 12'; Osvaldo 18'; Pjanić (yellow card) 61'; Tachtsidis 74', (yellow card) 76'	Stadium: Stadio Renato Dall'Ara; Attendance: 19,054; Referee: Antonio Danilo Giannoccaro

1 February 2013 23	Roma	2–4	Cagliari	Rome
20:45 CET (UTC+01:00)	Tachtsidis (yellow card) 33'; Totti 35'; Piris (yellow card) 87'; Lamela (yellow card) 90'; Marquinho 90+4'	Report	Nainggolan 3', (yellow card) 20'; Avelar (yellow card) 27'; Goicoechea 46' (o.g.); Sau 54'; Pisano 71'	Stadium: Stadio Olimpico; Attendance: 32,820; Referee: Andrea Romeo

10 February 2013 24	Sampdoria	3–1	Roma	Genoa
15:00 CET (UTC+01:00)	Estigarribia 56'; De Silvestri (yellow card) 68'; Sansone 73'; Krstičić (yellow card) 74'; Icardi 77'	Report	De Rossi (yellow card) 42'; Burdisso (yellow card) 70'; Lamela 75'	Stadium: Stadio Luigi Ferraris; Attendance: 22,822; Referee: Domenico Celi

17 February 2013 25	Roma	1–0	Juventus	Rome
20:45 CET (UTC+01:00)	De Rossi (yellow card) 18'; Totti (yellow card) 31', (goal) 58'	Report	Lichtsteiner (yellow card) 51'; Matri (yellow card) 61'; Pirlo (yellow card) 90+3'	Stadium: Stadio Olimpico; Attendance: 54,981; Referee: Gianluca Rocchi

24 February 2013 26	Atalanta	2–3	Roma	Bergamo
15:00 CET (UTC+01:00)	Livaja 8', 44'; Contini (yellow card) 61' (yellow-red card) 88'; Raimondi (yellow card) 80'; Carmona (yellow card) 85'; Cazzola (yellow card) 88'	Report	Marquinho 12'; Pjanić 34'; Torosidis 71', (yellow card) 90+2'	Stadium: Stadio Atleti Azzurri d'Italia; Attendance: 12,160; Referee: Andrea De Marco

3 March 2013 27	Roma	3–1	Genoa	Rome
20:45 CET (UTC+01:00)	Totti 16' (pen.), (yellow card) 78'; Burdisso (yellow card) 42'; Lamela (yellow card) 51'; Romagnoli 58'; Bradley (yellow card) 87'; Perrotta 88'	Report	Kucka (yellow card) 18' (yellow-red card) 78'; Borriello 42' (pen.); Vargas (yellow card) 45+2'; Pisano (yellow card) 61'	Stadium: Stadio Olimpico; Attendance: 35,568; Referee: Andrea Gervasoni

9 March 2013 28	Udinese	1–1	Roma	Udine
15:00 CET (UTC+01:00)	Maicosuel (yellow card) 44'; Domizzi (yellow card) 50'; Muriel 62'; Heurtaux (red card) 73'	Report	Lamela 20'; Totti (yellow card) 45'; Florenzi (yellow card) 64'; Torosidis (yellow card) 76'	Stadium: Stadio Friuli; Attendance: 10,780; Referee: Marco Guida

17 March 2013 29	Roma	2–0	Parma	Rome
20:45 CET (UTC+01:00)	Lamela 7'; Totti 70'	Report	Rosi (yellow card) 47'; Benalouane (yellow card) 55'; Valdés (yellow card) 69'	Stadium: Stadio Olimpico; Attendance: 34,667; Referee: Carmine Russo

30 March 2013 30	Palermo	2–0	Roma	Palermo
15:00 CET (UTC+01:00)	Muñoz (yellow card) 9'; Iličić 21', (yellow card) 51'; Miccoli 35'; Dybala (yellow card) 77'	Report	Piris (yellow card) 53'; Osvaldo (yellow card) 62'	Stadium: Stadio Renzo Barbera; Attendance: 15,436; Referee: Gianpaolo Calvarese

7 April 2013 31	Roma	1–1	Lazio	Rome
20:45 CEST (UTC+02:00)	De Rossi (yellow card) 43'; Totti 56' (pen.); Lamela (yellow card) 59'; Pjanić (yellow card) 81'; Castán (yellow card) 90+2'	Report	Hernanes 16'; Radu (yellow card) 31'; Lulić (yellow card) 52'; Cana (yellow card) 59'; Biava (yellow card) 63' (yellow-red card) 69'	Stadium: Stadio Olimpico; Attendance: 52,326; Referee: Paolo Mazzoleni

14 April 2013 32	Torino	1–2	Roma	Turin
15:00 CEST (UTC+02:00)	Bianchi 31', (yellow card) 31'; Gazzi (yellow card) 35'; Vives (yellow card) 77'	Report	Osvaldo 22'; Burdisso (yellow card) 27'; Balzaretti (yellow card) 37' (yellow-red card) 80'; Lamela 60'; Bradley (yellow card) 83'	Stadium: Stadio Olimpico di Torino; Attendance: 17,129; Referee: Andrea Romeo

21 April 2013 33	Roma	1–1	Pescara	Rome
15:00 CEST (UTC+02:00)	Torosidis (yellow card) 48'; Destro (yellow card) 48', (goal) 51'	Report	Caprari 14'; Togni (yellow card) 57'; Di Francesco (yellow card) 84'; Bianchi (yellow card) 90+4'	Stadium: Stadio Olimpico; Attendance: 42,273; Referee: Davide Massa

28 April 2013 34	Roma	4–0	Siena	Rome
15:00 CEST (UTC+02:00)	Osvaldo 14', 41', 67'; Lamela 16'; Pjanić (yellow card) 39'	Report	Vergassola (yellow card) 60'	Stadium: Stadio Olimpico; Attendance: 41,949; Referee: Carmine Russo

5 May 2013 35	Fiorentina	0–1	Roma	Florence
15:00 CEST (UTC+02:00)	Tomović (yellow card) 65'; Toni (yellow card) 79'	Report	De Rossi (yellow card) 61'; Balzaretti (yellow card) 64'; Osvaldo 90+2', (yellow card) 90+3'	Stadium: Stadio Artemio Franchi; Attendance: 33,399; Referee: Paolo Mazzoleni

8 May 2013 36	Roma	0–1	Chievo	Rome
20:45 CEST (UTC+02:00)	Piris (yellow card) 24'	Report	Luciano (yellow card) 32'; Stoian (yellow card) 42'; Papp (yellow card) 45+1'; Théréau 90'	Stadium: Stadio Olimpico; Attendance: 34,620; Referee: Sebastiano Peruzzo

12 May 2013 37	Milan	0–0	Roma	Milan
20:45 CEST (UTC+02:00)	Balotelli (yellow card) 40'; Muntari (yellow card) 41' (red card) 41'; Ambrosini (yellow card) 77'; Constant (yellow card) 90+4'	Report	Dodô (yellow card) 73'; Burdisso (yellow card) 88'; Totti (yellow card) 89' (red card) 90+2'	Stadium: San Siro; Attendance: 50,983; Referee: Gianluca Rocchi

19 May 2013 38	Roma	2–1	Napoli	Rome
20:45 CEST (UTC+02:00)	Marquinho 47'; Destro 58', (yellow card) 78'	Report	Rolando (yellow card) 80'; Cavani 84', (yellow card) 88'; Džemaili (yellow card) 86'; Armero (yellow card) 87'	Stadium: Stadio Olimpico; Attendance: 32,454; Referee: Luca Banti

=== Coppa Italia ===
11 December 2012 Round of 16	Roma	3–0	Atalanta	Rome
20:00 CET (UTC+01:00)	Pjanić 21', (yellow card) 23'; Osvaldo 31', (yellow card) 55' (yellow-red card) 56'; Destro 52'		Raimondi (yellow card) 58'; Moralez (yellow card) 72'	Stadium: Stadio Olimpico; Attendance: 9,769; Referee: Carmine Russo

16 January 2013 Quarter-finals	Fiorentina	0–1 (a.e.t.)	Roma	Florence
20:00 CET (UTC+01:00)	Aquilani (yellow card) 61'; Tomović (yellow card) 74'; Savić (yellow card) 120'; Cuadrado (red card) 120+2'; Neto (yellow card) 120+4'		Florenzi (yellow card) 37'; Burdisso (yellow card) 40'; Pjanić (yellow card) 43'; Castán (yellow card) 53'; Bradley (yellow card) 55'; Destro 97'; Taddei (yellow card) 115' (yellow-red card) 117'; Dodô (red card) 120+2'	Stadium: Stadio Artemio Franchi; Attendance: 20,003; Referee: Nicola Rizzoli

23 January 2013 Semi-finals; First leg	Roma	2–1	Internazionale	Rome
20:45 CET (UTC+01:00)	Florenzi 13'; Destro 33'; Lamela (yellow card) 86'; Burdisso (yellow card) 90+2'		Pereira (yellow card) 40'; Palacio 43'; Guarín (yellow card) 70'; Chivu (yellow card) 84'	Stadium: Stadio Olimpico; Attendance: 28,415; Referee: Andrea De Marco

17 April 2013 Semi-finals; Second leg	Internazionale	2–3	Roma	Milan
20:45 CEST (UTC+02:00)	Jonathan 22', (yellow card) 86'; Juan Jesus (yellow card) 61'; Álvarez 80'		Destro 55', 69'; Torosidis 74'	Stadium: San Siro; Attendance: 52,634; Referee: Mauro Bergonzi

26 May 2013 Final	Roma	0–1	Lazio	Rome
18:00 CEST (UTC+02:00)	Balzaretti (yellow card) 11'; Marquinho (yellow card) 26'; Burdisso (yellow card) 87'; Totti (yellow card) 90+2'		Ledesma (yellow card) 1'; Hernanes (yellow card) 32'; Klose (yellow card) 38'; Lulić 71', (yellow card) 75'	Stadium: Stadio Olimpico; Attendance: 70,000; Referee: Daniele Orsato

== Statistics ==
=== Appearances and goals ===
No.	Pos	Nat	Player	Total		Serie A		Coppa Italia	
No.	Pos	Nat	Player	Apps	Goals	Apps	Goals	Apps	Goals
Goalkeepers
1	GK	(Romania) ROU	Bogdan Lobonț	6	0	5	0	1	0
13	GK	(Uruguay) URU	Mauro Goicoechea	16	0	13+2	0	1	0
24	GK	(Netherlands) NED	Maarten Stekelenburg	22	0	19	0	3	0
55	GK	(Lithuania) LTU	Tomas Švedkauskas	0	0	0	0	0	0
Defenders
3	DF	(Brazil) BRA	Marquinhos	30	0	22+4	0	4	0
5	DF	(Brazil) BRA	Leandro Castán	34	1	30	1	3+1	0
23	DF	(Paraguay) PAR	Iván Piris	32	0	28+1	0	3	0
27	DF	(Brazil) BRA	Dodô	15	0	7+4	0	0+4	0
29	DF	(Argentina) ARG	Nicolás Burdisso	29	1	25	1	4	0
35	DF	(Greece) GRE	Vasilis Torosidis	12	2	9+2	1	1	1
42	DF	(Italy) ITA	Federico Balzaretti	32	0	24+3	0	4+1	0
46	DF	(Italy) ITA	Alessio Romagnoli	3	1	1+1	1	1	0
Midfielders
4	MF	(United States) USA	Michael Bradley	35	1	24+6	1	5	0
7	MF	(Brazil) BRA	Marquinho	30	4	11+15	4	2+2	0
8	MF	(Argentina) ARG	Erik Lamela	36	15	30+3	15	3	0
11	MF	(Brazil) BRA	Rodrigo Taddei	6	0	2+2	0	0+2	0
15	MF	(Bosnia and Herzegovina) BIH	Miralem Pjanić	29	4	20+7	3	2	1
16	MF	(Italy) ITA	Daniele De Rossi	29	0	21+4	0	4	0
20	MF	(Italy) ITA	Simone Perrotta	17	2	5+11	2	0+1	0
48	MF	(Italy) ITA	Alessandro Florenzi	39	4	25+11	3	3	1
77	MF	(Greece) GRE	Panagiotis Tachtsidis	23	1	17+4	1	1+1	0
Forwards
9	FW	(Italy) ITA	Dani Osvaldo	31	17	25+4	16	1+1	1
10	FW	(Italy) ITA	Francesco Totti	37	12	33+1	12	3	0
17	FW	(Uruguay) URU	Nicolás López	7	1	0+6	1	1	0
22	FW	(Italy) ITA	Mattia Destro	26	11	11+10	6	5	5
Players transferred out during the season

Last updated: 26 May 2013
Source: Competitions

=== Goalscorers ===
Rank	No.	Pos	Nat	Name	Serie A	Coppa Italia	Total
1	9	FW	(Italy)	Dani Osvaldo	16	1	17
2	8	MF	(Argentina)	Erik Lamela	15	0	15
3	10	FW	(Italy)	Francesco Totti	12	0	12
4	22	FW	(Italy)	Mattia Destro	6	5	11
5	7	MF	(Brazil)	Marquinho	4	0	4
5	15	MF	(Bosnia and Herzegovina)	Miralem Pjanić	3	1	4
5	48	MF	(Italy)	Alessandro Florenzi	3	1	4
8	20	MF	(Italy)	Simone Perrotta	2	0	2
8	35	DF	(Greece)	Vasilis Torosidis	1	1	2
10	4	MF	(United States)	Michael Bradley	1	0	1
10	5	DF	(Brazil)	Leandro Castán	1	0	1
10	17	FW	(Uruguay)	Nicolás López	1	0	1
10	29	DF	(Argentina)	Nicolás Burdisso	1	0	1
10	46	DF	(Italy)	Alessio Romagnoli	1	0	1
10	77	MF	(Greece)	Panagiotis Tachtsidis	1	0	1
Own goal					0	0	0
Totals					71	9	80

Last updated: 26 May 2013

=== Clean sheets ===
Rank	No.	Pos	Nat	Name	Serie A	Coppa Italia	Total
1	24	GK	(Netherlands)	Maarten Stekelenburg	3	1	4
2	1	GK	(Romania)	Bogdan Lobonț	3	0	3
2	13	GK	(Uruguay)	Mauro Goicoechea	2	1	3
Totals					9	2	11

Last updated: 26 May 2013

=== Disciplinary record ===
No.	Pos	Nat	Name	Serie A			Coppa Italia			Total		
No.	Pos	Nat	Name	Booked	(yellow card) (yellow-red card)	Sent off (straight red)	Booked	(yellow card) (yellow-red card)	Sent off (straight red)	Booked	(yellow card) (yellow-red card)	Sent off (straight red)
1	GK	(Romania)	Bogdan Lobonț	0	0	0	0	0	0	0	0	0
13	GK	(Uruguay)	Mauro Goicoechea	1	0	0	0	0	0	1	0	0
24	GK	(Netherlands)	Maarten Stekelenburg	1	0	0	0	0	0	1	0	0
55	GK	(Lithuania)	Tomas Švedkauskas	0	0	0	0	0	0	0	0	0
3	DF	(Brazil)	Marquinhos	0	0	1	0	0	0	0	0	1
5	DF	(Brazil)	Leandro Castán	6	0	0	1	0	0	7	0	0
23	DF	(Paraguay)	Iván Piris	5	0	0	0	0	0	5	0	0
27	DF	(Brazil)	Dodô	1	0	0	0	0	1	1	0	1
29	DF	(Argentina)	Nicolás Burdisso	9	0	0	3	0	0	12	0	0
35	DF	(Greece)	Vasilis Torosidis	3	0	0	0	0	0	3	0	0
42	DF	(Italy)	Federico Balzaretti	4	1	0	1	0	0	5	1	0
46	DF	(Italy)	Alessio Romagnoli	0	0	0	0	0	0	0	0	0
4	MF	(United States)	Michael Bradley	5	0	0	1	0	0	6	0	0
7	MF	(Brazil)	Marquinho	2	0	0	1	0	0	3	0	0
8	MF	(Argentina)	Erik Lamela	7	0	0	1	0	0	8	0	0
11	MF	(Brazil)	Rodrigo Taddei	2	0	0	0	1	0	2	1	0
15	MF	(Bosnia and Herzegovina)	Miralem Pjanić	6	1	0	2	0	0	8	1	0
16	MF	(Italy)	Daniele De Rossi	6	0	1	0	0	0	6	0	1
20	MF	(Italy)	Simone Perrotta	0	0	0	0	0	0	0	0	0
48	MF	(Italy)	Alessandro Florenzi	3	0	0	1	0	0	4	0	0
77	MF	(Greece)	Panagiotis Tachtsidis	8	0	1	0	0	0	8	0	1
9	FW	(Italy)	Dani Osvaldo	5	1	0	0	1	0	5	2	0
10	FW	(Italy)	Francesco Totti	6	1	0	1	0	0	7	1	0
17	FW	(Uruguay)	Nicolás López	0	0	0	0	0	0	0	0	0
22	FW	(Italy)	Mattia Destro	5	1	0	0	0	0	5	1	0
Totals				85	5	3	12	2	1	97	7	4

Last updated: 26 May 2013
