= Iván Piris =

Paraguayan footballer (born 1989)

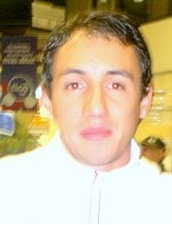
- Piris in 2011

Personal information
- Full name: Iván Rodrigo Piris Leguizamón
- Date of birth: 10 March 1989 (age 37)
- Place of birth: Itauguá, Paraguay
- Height: 1.72 m (5 ft 8 in)
- Position: Full back

Team information
- Current team: Recoleta FC
- Number: 26

Senior career*
Years	Team	Apps	(Gls)
2008–2011	Cerro Porteño	52	(0)
2011–2014	Deportivo Maldonado	0	(0)
2011–2012	→ São Paulo (loan)	36	(1)
2012–2013	→ Roma (loan)	29	(0)
2013–2014	→ Sporting CP (loan)	19	(0)
2014–2016	Udinese	58	(0)
2016–2018	Monterrey	31	(0)
2017–2018	→ León (loan)	13	(0)
2018	Newell's Old Boys	9	(0)
2019–2025	Club Libertad	157	(2)
2025–	Recoleta FC	24	(0)

International career
2007–2009	Paraguay U20	15	(0)
2011–2023	Paraguay	37	(0)
Medal record
Representing Paraguay
Copa América
Runner-up	2011 Argentina	Team
- * Club domestic league appearances and goals as of 7 November 2025

Iván Rodrigo Piris Leguizamón (born 10 March 1989) is a Paraguayan footballer who plays as a full-back for Recoleta FC.

== Club career ==
=== Cerro Porteno ===
Piris spent three years at Cerro Porteño, playing a particularly large role in the club's run to the semi-finals of the 2011 Copa Libertadores. His performances in the competition alerted clubs around the world of his ability, and it looked unlikely that he would stay with Cerro Porteño. He eventually signed for Brazilian club São Paulo FC for an alleged fee of €2 million. São Paulo signed Piris on a two-year loan deal from Deportivo Maldonado on 19 July 2011.

=== São Paulo ===
Piris joined up with his new teammates after the 2011 Copa América after São Paulo announced his signing on Thursday 15 July.

=== Roma ===
On 1 August 2012, Piris was loaned to Italian side Roma for a fee of €700,000, with the option of purchasing his rights at the end of the 2012–13 season for €4 million. He was virtually ever-present in the side under Zdeněk Zeman but, following the arrival of Aurelio Andreazzoli, he found playing time more difficult to come by, having to compete with Vasilis Torosidis.

=== Sporting Lisbon ===
Piris signed with Sporting on loan for the 2013–14 season.

=== Udinese ===
Piris returned to Italian Serie A for Udinese in August 2014. According to La Gazzetta dello Sport it was a loan, but according to Lega Serie A, it was a definitive deal from Deportivo Maldonado.

== International career ==
Piris was part of Paraguay's 2011 Copa América runners-up side. He played in the semi-final victory over Venezuela, as well as the 3–0 loss to Uruguay in the final.

== Honours ==
- Paraguayan League 2009-A
