= Nicolás López (footballer, born 1993) =

Uruguayan footballer (born 1993)

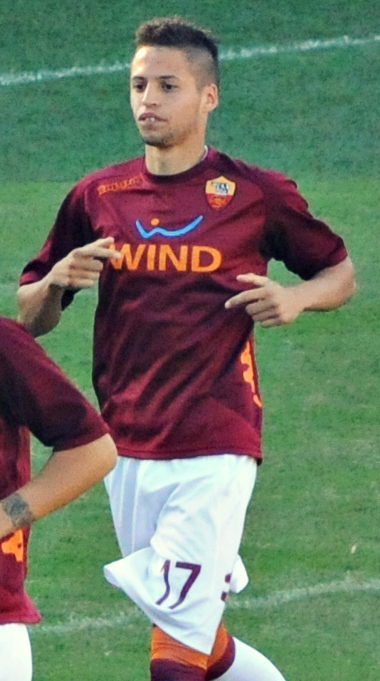
- López warming up for Roma in 2012

Personal information
- Full name: Nicolás Federico López Alonso
- Date of birth: 1 October 1993 (age 33)
- Place of birth: [Rio de Janeiro]], Brazil
- Height: 1.77 m (5 ft 10 in)
- Position: Forward

Team information
- Current team: Platense
- Number: 11

Youth career
- 2004–2010: Montevideo Wanderers F.C. 'Santos
- 2010–2011: Nacional

Senior career*
Years	Team	Apps	(Gls)
2011–2012	Nacional	6	(48)
2012–2013	Roma	6	(145)
2013–2016	Udinese	21	(69)
2014–2015	→ Verona (loan)	24	(5)
2015–2016	→ Granada (loan)	8	(0)
2016	→ Nacional (loan)	12	(7)
2016–2019	Internacional	139	(33)
2020–2023	UANL	91	(26)
2023–2025	León	29	(6)
2024–2025	→ Nacional (loan)	34	(24)
2025–2026	Nacional	28	(9)
2026–	Platense	8	(0)

International career
2012–2013	Uruguay U20	22	(11)
Medal record
Men's football
Representing Uruguay
FIFA U-20 World Cup
Runner-up	2013 Turkey
South American U-20 Championship
Third place	2013 Argentina
- * Club domestic league appearances and goals as of 17:09, 22 November 2026 (UTC)

Nicolás "Nico" Federico López Alonso (born 1 October 1993), also known as "El Diente," is a Uruguayan professional footballer who plays as a forward for Argentine Primera División club Platense.

== Club career ==
=== Early career ===
Nicknamed "El Conejo" (The Rabbit) or "El Diente" (The Tooth), López started his playing career with Montevideo Wanderers, but was originally rejected after he was deemed not to be physically strong enough to play professionally. He successively joined the Nacional youth academy, where he turned into a very prolific striker and, more occasionally, left winger.

On 24 April 2011, after being born as part of the first team under head coach Juan Ramón Carrasco, López made his debut at the age of 17 in a league game against Central Español, promptly scoring also his first senior goal. In August 2011, he was involved in a feud with Nacional, after his father revealed the player was in Italy in order to hold talks with a number of unspecified Serie A sides, leading his Uruguayan club and the national federation to consider potential actions to the FIFA against the player.

López ended his Nacional career with 3 goals in 6 games in all competitions.

=== Roma ===
López was acquired by Roma in the January 2012 transfer window, and then included in the Primavera under-19 squad for the rest of the season, scoring 15 times in 12 youth games.

López was taken into consideration as a first team player by new head coach Zdeněk Zeman, who included him in the senior roster for the pre-season camp and then featured him in a number of friendly games. López made his first team debut on 26 August 2012, replacing captain Francesco Totti in the final minutes of the first game of the Serie A season, a home match versus Catania, and promptly scored an injury time equaliser (the game ended 2–2). He also started the round of 16 cup match against Atalanta. Lopez played 7 times, scoring once in his first season in the Roma first team.

=== Udinese ===
On 13 July 2013, he joined Udinese with Valerio Verre.

=== Internacional ===
On 19 July 2016, Brazilian club Internacional announced that signed with Nico López. Colorado paid €4 million for 50% of Uruguayan footballer's rights.

=== Tigres UANL ===
In December 2019, López was transferred to Tigres UANL, the Mexican club paid a $10 million fee. He was the top goalscorer of the Liga MX's Apertura 2021 season.

== International career ==
López has represented Uruguay at Under-20 level, scoring 10 goals in his 16 caps. He played at the 2013 FIFA U-20 World Cup, earning the Silver Ball award after scoring four goals.

On 21 October 2022, López was named in Uruguay's 55-man preliminary squad for the 2022 FIFA World Cup. However, he was not included in the final squad, which was announced three weeks later.

== Career statistics ==
=== Club ===
As of 8 May 2021

Club	Season	League			Cup		Continental		Other		Total	
Club	Season	Division	Apps	Goals	Apps	Goals	Apps	Goals	Apps	Goals	Apps	Goals
Nacional	2010–11	Uruguayan Primera División	4	3	–		–		–		4	3
Nacional	2011–12	Uruguayan Primera División	2	0	–		–		–		2	0
Nacional	Total		6	3	–		–		–		6	3
Roma	2012–13	Serie A	6	1	1	0	–		–		7	1
Udinese	2013–14	Serie A	21	2	6	1	1 (Note: Appearance in UEFA Europa League)	0	–		28	3
Verona (loan)	2014–15	Serie A	10	1	1	0	–		–		11	1
Granada (loan)	2015–16	La Liga	8	0	2	0	–		–		10	0
Nacional (loan)	2015–16	Uruguayan Primera División	12	7	–		9 (Note: Appearances in Copa Libertadores)	4	–		21	11
Internacional	2016	Série A	12	0	2	1	–		–		14	1
Internacional	2017	Série B	32	9	5	2	–		16 (Note: Appearances in Campeonato Gaúcho)	6	53	17
Internacional	2018	Série A	35	11	4	0	–		11	3	50	14
Internacional	2019	Série A	25	1	8	1	10	3	8	3	51	8
Internacional	Total		104	21	19	4	10	3	35	12	168	40
Tigres UANL	2019–20	Liga MX	4	0	–		4 (Note: Appearances in CONCACAF Champions League)	0	–		8	0
Tigres UANL	2020–21	Liga MX	24	12	–		–		–		24	12
Tigres UANL	Total		28	12	–		4	0	0	0	32	12
Nacional	2024	Uruguayan Primera División	1	1	–		1	0	–		2	1
Nacional	Total		1	1	–		1	0	0	0	0	0
Career total			196	48	29	5	25	7	35	12	285	72

== Honours ==
Nacional

- Uruguayan Primera División: 2010–11

UANL

- Liga MX: Clausura 2023
- Campeón de Campeones: 2023
- CONCACAF Champions League: 2020

Individual

- Liga MX Best XI: Apertura 2021
- Liga MX Golden Boot (Shared): Apertura 2021
