= Mauro Goicoechea =

Uruguayan footballer (born 1988)

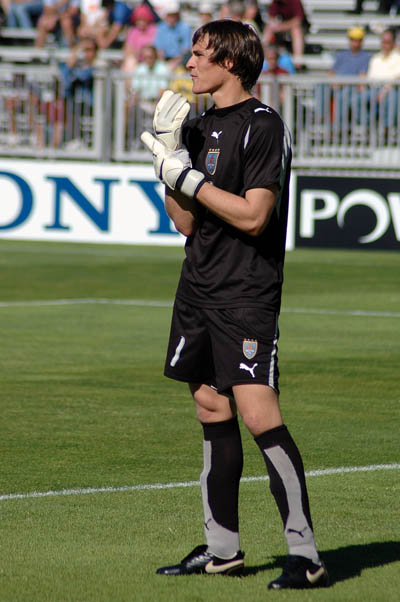
- Mauro Goicoechea

Personal information
- Full name: Mauro Daniel Goicoechea Furia
- Date of birth: 27 March 1988 (age 38)
- Place of birth: Montevideo, Uruguay
- Height: 1.85 m (6 ft 1 in)
- Position: Goalkeeper

Team information
- Current team: Danubio
- Number: 1

Youth career
- Danubio

Senior career*
Years	Team	Apps	(Gls)
2006–2014	Danubio	75	(0)
2012–2013	→ Roma (loan)	15	(0)
2014	Oțelul Galați	15	(0)
2014–2015	Arouca	33	(0)
2015–2021	Toulouse	21	(0)
2022	Boston River	0	(0)
2023–	Danubio	98	(0)

International career^{‡}
2005	Uruguay U17	1	(0)
2007	Uruguay U20	3	(0)
- * Club domestic league appearances and goals as of 1 October 2025 ‡ National team caps and goals as of 7 July 2007

Mauro Daniel Goicoechea Furia (born 27 March 1988) is a Uruguayan professional footballer who plays as a goalkeeper for Uruguayan Primera División team Danubio.

== Club career ==
=== Danubio FC ===
Goicochea was born in Montevideo. In 2006, he signed his first professional contract with Danubio. Thanks to his good performances, he became the goalkeeper holder and his number was changed to 1. He played a total of 79 games with the club.

=== Roma ===
In August 2012, Goicoechea moved to A.S. Roma on a loan until the end of the season. He made his debut in a 3–2 loss against Parma in the second half, coming on as a substitute for the injured Maarten Stekelenburg. Goicoechea followed this up with an impressive display in a 4–1 victory over Palermo. He then started the following six games, against Lazio, Torino, Pescara and Siena, but following a string of unimpressive results and Zdeněk Zeman's sacking, which included an own goal in Zeman's last day in charge against Cagliari, where he dropped an easy catch inside the net, Stekelenburg was reinstated as the primary goalkeeper.

=== Oțelul Galați ===
In January 2014, Goicoechea signed a two-and-a-half-year contract with the Romanian club Oțelul Galați.

=== Arouca ===
In May 2014, Goicoechea moved clubs again, signing a two-year deal with Portuguese side Arouca. He made his debut on 18 August in a 1–1 home draw with Estoril.

=== Toulouse ===
On 14 July 2015, Goicoechea signed for Ligue 1 side Toulouse.

== International career ==
Goicoechea was part of the Uruguayan team at the 2005 FIFA U-17 World Championship, and Uruguay U20 team in the 2007 FIFA U-20 World Cup where they reached the round of 16. In this side he had teammates such as Edinson Cavani, Luis Suárez and Martín Cáceres among others.
