= Aurelio Andreazzoli =

Italian football coach and manager

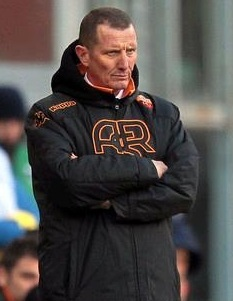

Personal information
- Full name: Aurelio Andreazzoli
- Date of birth: 5 November 1953 (age 72)
- Place of birth: Massa, Italy

Managerial career
- Years: Team
- 1987–1990: Ortonovo
- 1990–1991: Pietrasanta
- 1991–1992: Castelnuovo Garfagnana
- 1994–1996: Massese
- 1998–1999: Tempio
- 1999–2001: Aglianese
- 2001–2002: Grosseto
- 2003: Alessandria
- 2013: Roma (caretaker)
- 2017–2018: Empoli
- 2019: Empoli
- 2019: Genoa
- 2021–2022: Empoli
- 2022–2023: Ternana
- 2023: Ternana
- 2023–2024: Empoli

Aurelio Andreazzoli (born 5 November 1953) is an Italian football coach recently in charge of Serie B club Empoli.

== Career ==
In 2005, Andreazzoli joined Roma to become head coach Luciano Spalletti's assistant coach, becoming a valuable part of the team over the years. He was relieved from his duties after Spalletti departed Roma, only to be called back two years later to assist the newly appointed caretaker manager Vincenzo Montella. Andreazzoli continued to work with Luis Enrique and Zdeněk Zeman as a technique coach.

On 2 February 2013, after Zeman was relieved from his duties, Andreazzoli was appointed manager until the end of the 2012–13 season. His first win came in a 1–0 home win over Serie A leaders Juventus. On 8 April 2013, his side drew 1–1 with Lazio in his first Derby della Capitale as Roma manager. On 17 April 2013, he led Roma to the 2012–13 Coppa Italia final with a 2–3 win over Internazionale at the San Siro. On 26 May 2013, he led Roma on the most important match of his career in the competition final against intercity rivals Lazio, which Roma lost 0–1.

On 12 June 2013, Roma club president James Pallotta announced Rudi Garcia's appointment as the new manager of Roma, thereby ending Andreazzoli's spell as caretaker manager.

On 17 December 2017, he was named new head coach of Serie B promotion hopefuls Empoli in place of Vincenzo Vivarini. After a very successful season in which he guided Empoli to win the Serie B title and ensure promotion to the top flight for the 2018–19 Serie A season, his contract was extended for one more season. He was sacked on 5 November 2018. He was re-appointed by Empoli on 13 March 2019.

On 14 June 2019, Andreazzoli signed with Genoa but was sacked on 21 October with the team in second-to-last position.

On 21 June 2021, Andreazzoli agreed to return in charge of Empoli after the club's promotion to Serie A, signing a one-year contract with the Tuscans. He safely guided Empoli to a fourteenth place in the 2021–22 Serie A league and was praised for his team's performances; despite that, on 1 June 2022 Empoli announced Andreazzoli's expiring contract would not be extended.

On 2 December 2022, Andreazzoli was hired as the new head coach of Serie B club Ternana, signing a contract until 30 June 2024. On 25 February 2023, following an injury-time home loss to Cittadella, Andreazzoli tended his resignations with immediate effect. He was successively reappointed Ternana head coach for the new 2023–24 season, before he mutually rescinded his contract following a club takeover and a change of mind.

On 19 September 2023, Andreazzoli agreed to return to Empoli, taking charge of the struggling Serie A club on a one-year contract with an option for a further one-year extension. He was removed from his post on 15 January 2024, leaving Empoli deep into relegation zone.

== Career statistics ==
As of 15 January 2024

Team	Nat	From	To	Record							
Team	Nat	From	To	G	W	D	L	GF	GA	GD	Win %
Roma	(Italy)	2 February 2013	12 June 2013	17	9	4	4	25	17	+8	52.94
Empoli	(Italy)	17 December 2017	5 November 2018	35	17	10	8	61	43	+18	48.57
Empoli	(Italy)	13 March 2019	13 June 2019	11	5	1	5	17	17	+0	45.45
Genoa	(Italy)	20 June 2019	21 October 2019	9	2	2	5	13	21	−8	22.22
Empoli	(Italy)	21 June 2021	30 June 2022	41	12	11	18	59	78	−19	29.27
Ternana	(Italy)	2 December 2022	27 February 2023	24	5	6	13	19	36	−17	20.83
Empoli	(Italy)	19 September 2023	15 January 2024	16	3	4	9	11	23	−12	18.75
Total				153	53	38	62	206	235	−29	34.64

== Honours ==
Empoli

- Serie B: 2017–18
