= Miralem Pjanić =

Bosnian footballer (born 1990)

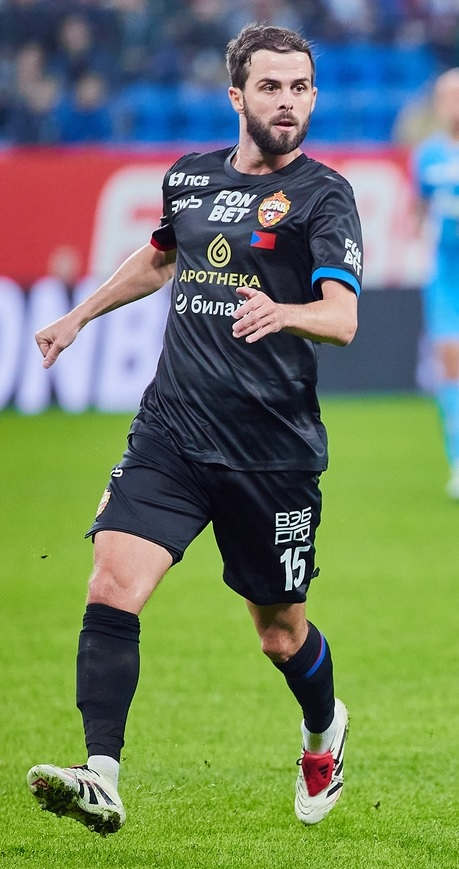
- Pjanić with CSKA Moscow in 2025

Personal information
- Full name: Miralem Pjanić
- Date of birth: 2 April 1990 (age 36)
- Place of birth: Tuzla, SR Bosnia and Herzegovina, SFR Yugoslavia
- Height: 1.78 m (5 ft 10 in)
- Position: Midfielder

Youth career
- 1997–2004: FC Schifflange 95
- 2004–2007: Metz

Senior career*
Years	Team	Apps	(Gls)
2007–2008	Metz	32	(4)
2008–2011	Lyon	90	(10)
2011–2016	Roma	159	(27)
2016–2020	Juventus	122	(15)
2020–2022	Barcelona	19	(0)
2021–2022	→ Beşiktaş (loan)	20	(0)
2022–2024	Sharjah	41	(4)
2024–2025	CSKA Moscow	16	(0)
Total		499	(60)

International career
2006	Luxembourg U17	4	(5)
2006–2007	Luxembourg U19	6	(1)
2008–2024	Bosnia and Herzegovina	115	(18)
- * Club domestic league appearances and goals

Miralem Pjanić (born 2 April 1990) is a Bosnian former professional footballer who played as a midfielder and represented the Bosnia and Herzegovina national team.

Pjanić was raised in Luxembourg after his family fled there following the outbreak of the Bosnian War. He started his professional career at Metz in France, playing there for one season. He signed for fellow French side Lyon in 2008, before joining Roma in 2011. During his time in Rome, Pjanić came to be recognized as one of the best midfielders in Serie A. In 2016, Pjanić joined Juventus, and was considered an integral player for the team, winning four league titles, two Coppa Italias, and being named in the Serie A Team of the Year for 2015–16, 2016–17, 2017–18 and 2018–19 seasons. He was also named in the 2016–17 UEFA Champions League Squad of the Season, for his role in Juventus's run to the final. Pjanić joined Barcelona in September 2020, also spending a year on loan at Beşiktaş in 2021. He signed with UAE Pro League club Sharjah in 2022. In 2024, he joined Russian Premier League side CSKA Moscow, following his departure from Sharjah. After leaving CSKA Moscow, he retired in 2025.

Pjanić initially represented Luxembourg as a youth international, appearing for them at under-17 and under-19 level, before switching to Bosnia and Herzegovina at senior level. He made his debut for them in 2008, and would earn 115 caps and score 18 goals before his retirement from international football in 2024. He represented the nation at their first major tournament, the 2014 FIFA World Cup.

Pjanić was ranked 55th in The Guardian's list of "The 100 best footballers in the world" in 2015. In 2019, he was ranked 50th in the same list. He has also been cited as one of the greatest free-kick takers of all time.

== Early life ==
Pjanić was born on 2 April 1990 in Tuzla, SR Bosnia and Herzegovina, in what was then SFR Yugoslavia (modern-day Bosnia and Herzegovina); to father Fahrudin and mother Fatima. He developed an interest in football through his father, a former third division footballer in Yugoslavia, and began his football career in Luxembourg following his family's arrival to the country shortly before the outbreak of the Bosnian War. While in Luxembourg, Pjanić often attended training sessions and matches with his father. At the age of seven, his father discovered that he had talent and an interest in football and allowed his son to join local club FC Schifflange 95 in Schifflange. While at Schifflange, Pjanić drew interest from several Belgian, Dutch and German clubs, but agreed to join Metz in France in 2004. Pjanić was recommended by former Metz player and Luxembourg international Guy Hellers.

== Club career ==
=== Metz ===
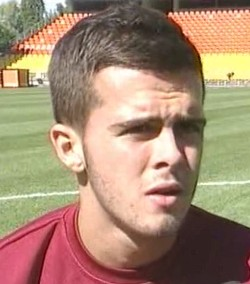
Pjanić with Metz in 2007

Pjanić joined Metz at age 14 on a youth contract and spent approximately three years in the club's academy. In the 2005–06 season, he played on the under-16 team that won the Championnat National des 16 ans and, following the season, signed a five-year élite contract with the club. After spending the 2006–07 season with the club's under-18 team, Pjanić was promoted to the club's amateur team in the Championnat de France Amateur for the 2007–08 season. He appeared in the first two matches of the campaign before earning a call up to the senior team by manager Francis De Taddeo. Pjanić made his professional football debut, at the age of 17, on 18 August 2007 in a league match against Paris Saint-Germain. He appeared as a substitute in a 0–0 draw. The following week, he earned his first start in a 2–0 defeat to Rennes.

After a string of respectable appearances, on 30 November 2007, Pjanić signed his first professional contract agreeing to a three-year deal, tying him to Metz until 2010. After becoming professional, he was assigned the number 15 shirt. Pjanić scored his first professional goal for Metz on 15 December 2007 in a 2–1 defeat against Sochaux converting on a penalty in the 88th minute, thus becoming one of the youngest players to score a goal in Ligue 1 history. Among his other positive performances included converting another penalty in a 2–1 loss to Nice and scoring on the final day of the season against Le Mans in a thrilling 4–3 victory.

Pjanić's play in the Coupe de France was with distinction as well appearing in and starting all four matches the club contested. He assisted on several goals in the club's 6–1 demolition of Vesoul Haute-Saône. In the ensuing round, Pjanić scored the final goal in Metz's 3–0 triumph over Strasbourg and played the full 90 minutes in the club's 1–0 win over Lorient in the Round of 16 helping the club who were, at the time, struggling in domestic play, reach the quarterfinals of the Coupe de France. Metz were eventually eliminated by the eventual champions Lyon. In total, Pjanić made 38 appearances and scored 5 goals with Metz. For his efforts, he was nominated for the Ligue 1 Young Player of the Year award, won by Hatem Ben Arfa.

Though Pjanić was in great form throughout the season, Metz still suffered relegation back to Ligue 2, prompting speculation that the young star would move to any of a host of clubs, with English clubs Arsenal and Chelsea, Spanish clubs Barcelona and Real Madrid, Italian clubs Milan and Inter, and French club Lyon vying for his services.

=== Lyon ===
After Metz received numerous offers for the player's services, on 6 June 2008, Pjanić and Metz both reached an agreement with Olympique Lyonnais for the transfer of the player. Pjanić agreed to a five-year contract, while the transfer fee was priced at €7.5 million plus future incentives.

Labeled as the future replacement for the ageing Juninho, Pjanić was initially given the number 12 shirt, but switched to the number 18 for pre-season and made his club debut in the team's Trophée des Champions defeat to Bordeaux. He made his league debut in the opening league match of the season against Toulouse playing the entire match in a 3–0 victory. Pjanić's debut season with Lyon was cut in half after fracturing his fibula in a match against Sochaux in October 2008, as a result of a bad tackle by Stéphane Dalmat. Despite initially being diagnosed as missing a month, he missed two months and made his return on 3 January 2009 in the club's 6–0 thrashing of amateur club US Concarneau in the Coupe de France playing 66 minutes.

For the 2009–10 season, Pjanić switched to the number 8 shirt, formerly worn by his predecessor and Lyon great Juninho. He started the season strong scoring his first career goal for Lyon on a free kick in Lyon's playoff round match against Belgian club Anderlecht in the UEFA Champions League. Lyon won the match 5–1. A couple of days later, he scored his first career league goal for the club, in which his side won 3–0 at Auxerre. Pjanić continued his stellar play in the Champions League scoring the only goal in the club's opening group stage match against Italian club Fiorentina. In the club's second group stage match against Hungarian club Debreceni, he scored again, via free kick, and also assisted on two other goals in the club's 4–0 victory. On 10 March 2010, Pjanić scored the equalizing goal in Lyon's 1–1 draw with Spanish club Real Madrid in the second leg of their first knockout round tie in the UEFA Champions League. The draw sent Lyon through to the quarter-finals due to their 1–0 win in the first leg at the Stade Gerland.

Pjanić began the 2010–11 season as a starter and featured in the team's first three games. However, following the arrival of Yoann Gourcuff, he began appearing as a substitute and, subsequently, appeared as a substitute in the team's next seven league matches. On 29 September 2010, Pjanić scored his first goal of the season in the team's 3–1 win over Israeli club Hapoel Tel Aviv in the UEFA Champions League. As a result of his good form, Claude Puel began experimenting playing both Gourcuff and Pjanić in the midfield, but after playing the two in a 2–0 win over Portuguese club Benfica in the Champions League and a 1–1 draw with Rennes in the league, this tactic was abandoned.

=== Roma ===
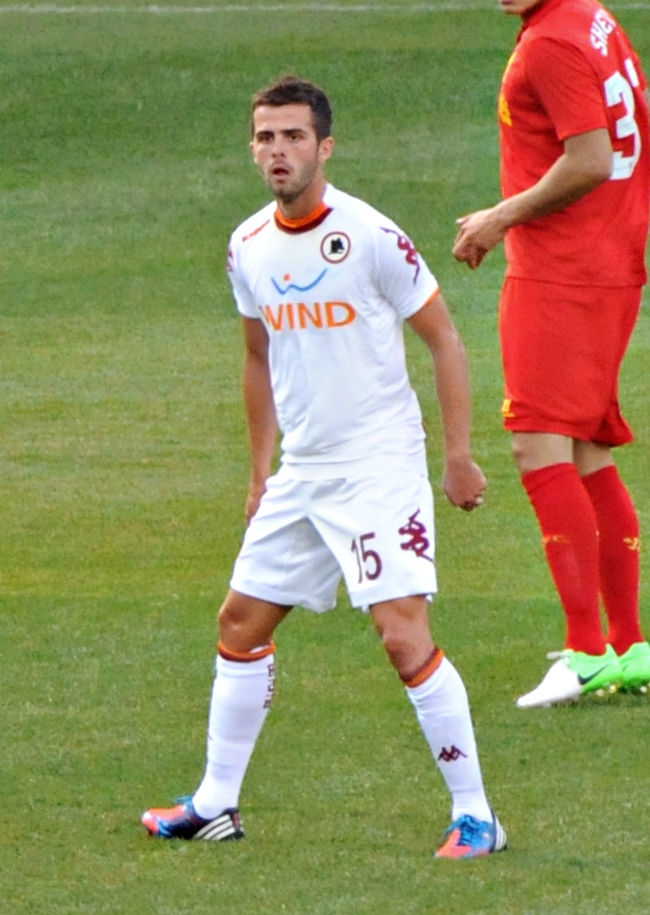
Pjanić playing for Roma in 2012

On 31 August 2011, Pjanić agreed a four-year deal with Italian club Roma, for an €11 million transfer fee. He scored his first goal for Roma against Lecce.

Pjanić started the 2012–13 season mostly on the bench. He got his chance in a Derby della Capitale and scored a goal. From that game, he started playing regularly and scored one more goal in 2–0 win over Torino and one in the Coppa Italia against Atalanta. In the 2013–14 season, under new Roma coach Rudi Garcia, he was a starter in the 4–3–3 midfield, playing a key role to the team's Serie A record of ten wins in the first ten-season matches.

Pjanić scored 6 goals and provided 6 assists in the 2013–14 Serie A season. On 25 April 2014, he scored the first goal in Roma's 2–0 victory over Milan; the goal was a wonderful individual display from Pjanić, as he dribbled past Sulley Muntari, Riccardo Montolivo, and Adil Rami before putting the ball in the net.

On 11 May 2014, Pjanić signed a new contract which will last until 30 June 2018. In a friendly tournament in Denver in July, he scored from inside his own half, but Roma lost 3–2 to Manchester United. In the 2014–15 season, he became considered as a rising star in Italian football, scoring 5 times and assisting 10 goals.

In the 2015–16 season, Pjanić emerged as one of the world's finest free-kick takers, netting a brilliant goal against Juventus on 30 August and scoring several more, including in the Champions League against Bayer Leverkusen. By the January break, he had scored 7 goals and assisted another 5, being linked with a transfer to Barcelona and Real Madrid in the winter transfer window. Towards the end of the season, rumours spread in the media of Pjanić's possible departure from Roma, as he was linked with Juventus. He finished the season with ten league goals, and 12 in all competitions, while also finishing the league season as the top assist provider in Serie A for the second consecutive season, alongside Juventus' Paul Pogba, with 12 assists.

=== Juventus ===
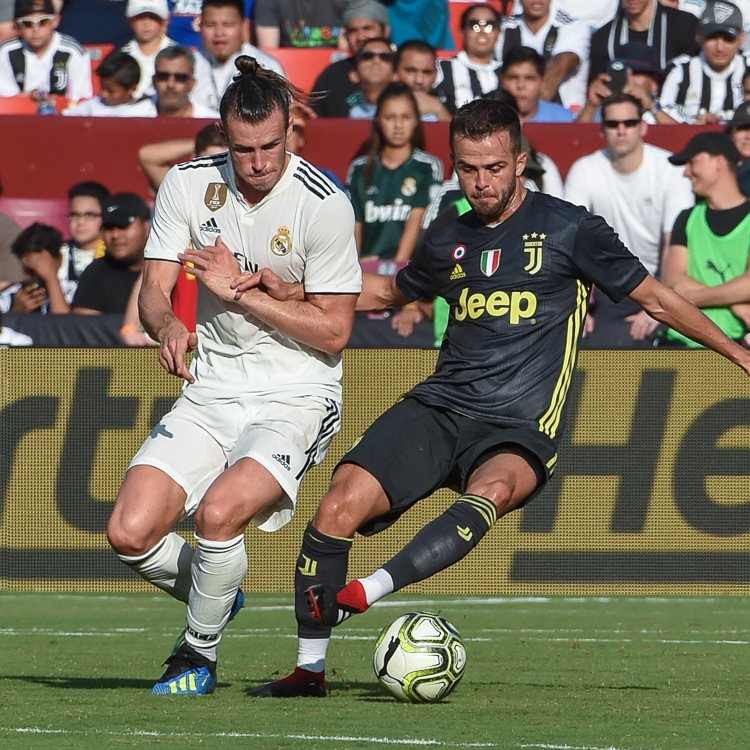
Pjanić (right) playing for Juventus against Real Madrid's Gareth Bale in a 2018–19 preseason friendly game

On 13 June 2016, Pjanić joined Juventus on a five-year contract for a fee of €32 million, ending a five-year stint with Roma. He chose the number 5 shirt to start the new season. On 10 September, Pjanić scored on his debut in a 3–1 home win over Sassuolo. After winning Coppa Italia and Serie A in his first season, he missed out on a potential treble, having lost in the Champions League final to Real Madrid.

Pjanić's second season at Juventus began with a 2–3 loss against Lazio in the 2017 Supercoppa Italiana. He scored his first goal of the season in city derby against Torino on 23 September 2017. Juventus won the game 4–0. On 28 February, Pjanić scored a crucial penalty against Atalanta to send Juventus through to the 2018 Coppa Italia final. Juventus won that final, with Pjanić contributing by assisting for one of the goals in a convincing triumph over Milan on 9 May 2018. Four days later, Pjanić once again became Serie A champion in a game against his old club Roma, which sealed his second domestic double in two seasons. On 19 May, the final match of the season, he scored his fifth league goal of the season, netting a trademark free kick, which sealed Juventus's 2–1 home win over Hellas Verona.

At the beginning of his third campaign with the club, Pjanić put pen to paper on a new five-year contract. He scored his first goal of the season in a 2–0 home win over Lazio on 25 August 2018. On 19 September, in his first UEFA Champions League game of the season, Pjanić helped his team to a win by converting two penalties against Valencia in an eventual 2–0 victory. On 6 October, in a game against Udinese, he made his 100th appearance for Juventus.

On 21 September 2019, Pjanić won his 100th match with Juventus in all competitions in a 2–1 home win over Verona in Serie A.

On 26 July 2020, he won his fourth league title with the club after defeating Sampdoria 2–0 at home. He made his final appearance for the club on 7 August, in a 2–1 home win over his former club Lyon in the second leg of the round of 16 of the UEFA Champions League; however, despite the victory, the result saw Juventus eliminated from the competition on away goals following a 2–2 aggregate draw.

=== Barcelona ===
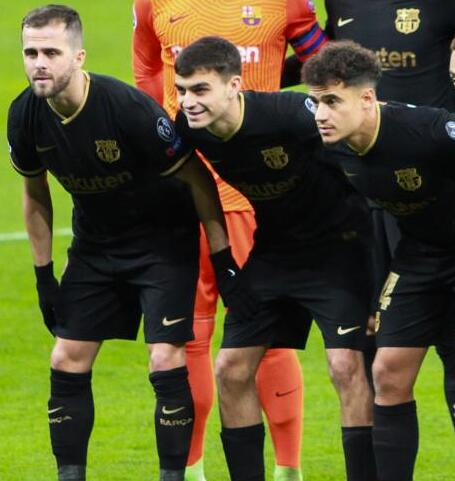
Pjanić (left) lining up for Barcelona in 2020

On 29 June 2020, Juventus announced that they had reached an agreement with Barcelona for the transfer of Pjanić on a deal worth €60 million, plus a maximum of €5 million in bonuses, to be effective following the conclusion of the 2019–20 season. The deal was also coordinated with a swap of Arthur, whom Juve signed for €72 million, plus a maximum of €10 million in bonuses. Pjanić signed a contract with the Spanish side for the next four seasons, until the end of the 2023–24 campaign, with a buy-out clause of €400 million. He made his debut on 27 September, coming on as a substitute in a 4–0 home win over Villarreal in La Liga.

However, Pjanić's stint at Barcelona was unsuccessful, as he made 30 appearances for the club (being named 13 times in the starting XI) and spent an average of 43 minutes on the pitch but did not score or assist any goals.

==== Loan to Beşiktaş ====
On 2 September 2021, Pjanić joined Beşiktaş on a season-long loan.

=== Sharjah ===
On 7 September 2022, Pjanić joined UAE Pro League club Sharjah.

=== CSKA Moscow ===
On 25 September 2024, Pjanić joined Russian Premier League club CSKA Moscow as a free agent. He won the Russian Cup on 1 June 2025. On 25 June, he left CSKA.

After leaving CSKA, Pjanić announced his retirement from professional football in December 2025.

== International career ==
=== Luxembourg ===
Due to spending his childhood in Luxembourg, Pjanić became eligible for their national team and began representing the nation's youth sides. He represented Luxembourg in the 2006 European Under-17 Championship, for which Luxembourg qualified automatically as hosts. He scored Luxembourg's only goal of the tournament. In that same year, he scored 4 goals in a match against Belgium, which ended in a 5–5 draw. Before making his decision regarding his national team status, Pjanić was eligible to represent Luxembourg and Bosnia and Herzegovina.

=== Bosnia and Herzegovina ===
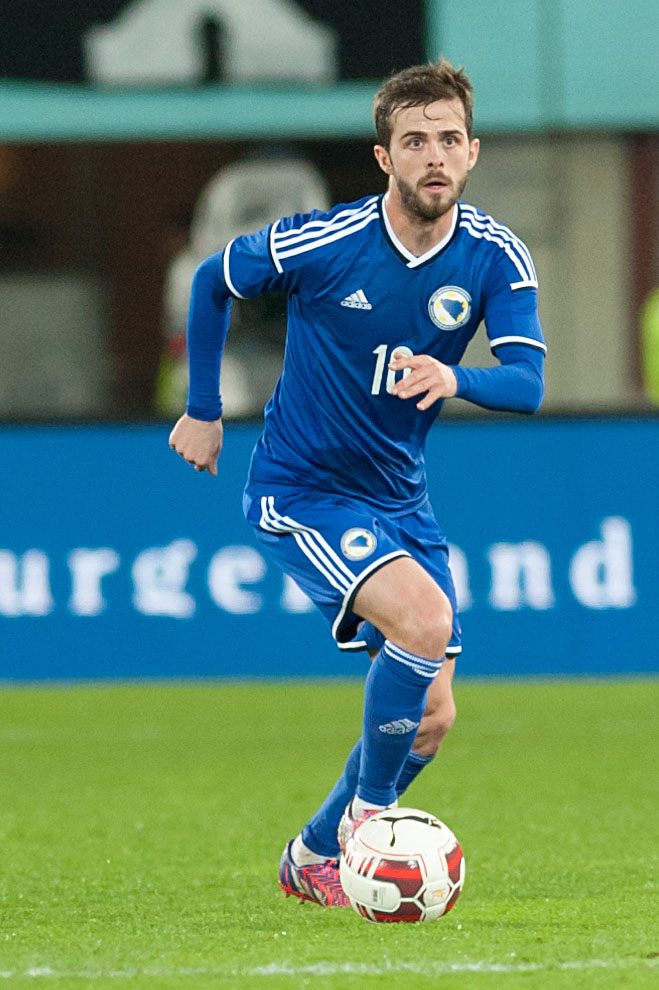
Pjanić playing for Bosnia and Herzegovina in 2015

In May 2008, during an interview for Bosnian newspaper, Pjanić stated that he wanted to play for Bosnia and Herzegovina. Eventually, officials in the Football Association of Bosnia and Herzegovina took notice and Pjanić was called up to the country's under-21 team. However, because Pjanić no longer had a Bosnian passport and needed FIFA approval to switch nationalities, he wasn't allowed to be called up for the senior team. After an eight-month wait and following the involvement of Željko Komšić, the Croat member of the Presidency of Bosnia and Herzegovina, Pjanić received a Bosnian passport in early 2008.

He debuted for Bosnia and Herzegovina on 20 August 2008 in the team's 1–2 loss to Bulgaria. On 3 March 2010, he scored his first senior international goal in Bosnia and Herzegovina's 2–1 win over Ghana in Sarajevo.

Pjanić was instrumental in Bosnia and Herzegovina's qualification for 2014 FIFA World Cup, their first major competition, and he was named in 23-man squad for the tournament. He debuted in the team's opening group match, a narrow defeat to Argentina at the Maracanã Stadium. On 25 June, during the final group match against Iran, Pjanić scored a goal, leading to a 3–1 victory to help Bosnia and Herzegovina to their first ever FIFA World Cup win.

On 31 March 2021, he played his 100th match for Bosnia and Herzegovina in a 1–0 loss to France in the 2022 FIFA World Cup qualification.

On 4 May 2024, Pjanić retired from international football after the team's unsuccessful UEFA Euro 2024 qualifying campaign. He collected 115 caps between 2008 and 2024 for the Dragons and scored 18 goals, making him the country's second most capped player. On 7 June 2025, the official farewell ceremony was held for him before the national's team game against San Marino in Zenica.

== Style of play ==
Nicknamed "il Piccolo Principe" ("the Little Prince") during his time with Roma, Pjanić was regarded as one of the most promising young midfielders of his generation in his youth, and was included in Don Balón's list of the 100 best young players in the world in 2010; however, he was also thought to lack composure at times in the media. His Juventus manager Massimiliano Allegri touted him as a potentially world class midfielder in 2016, later also adding that, although he was extremely talented, he needed to stay more "calm and focused" in order to fulfil his potential; subsequently, the 2016–17 season saw him establish himself as one of the best, most skillful, and most versatile midfielders in Europe. Although he was neither particularly quick, nor gifted with athleticism or physical strength, Pjanić was described as an efficient "old-fashioned playmaker with huge technical qualities".

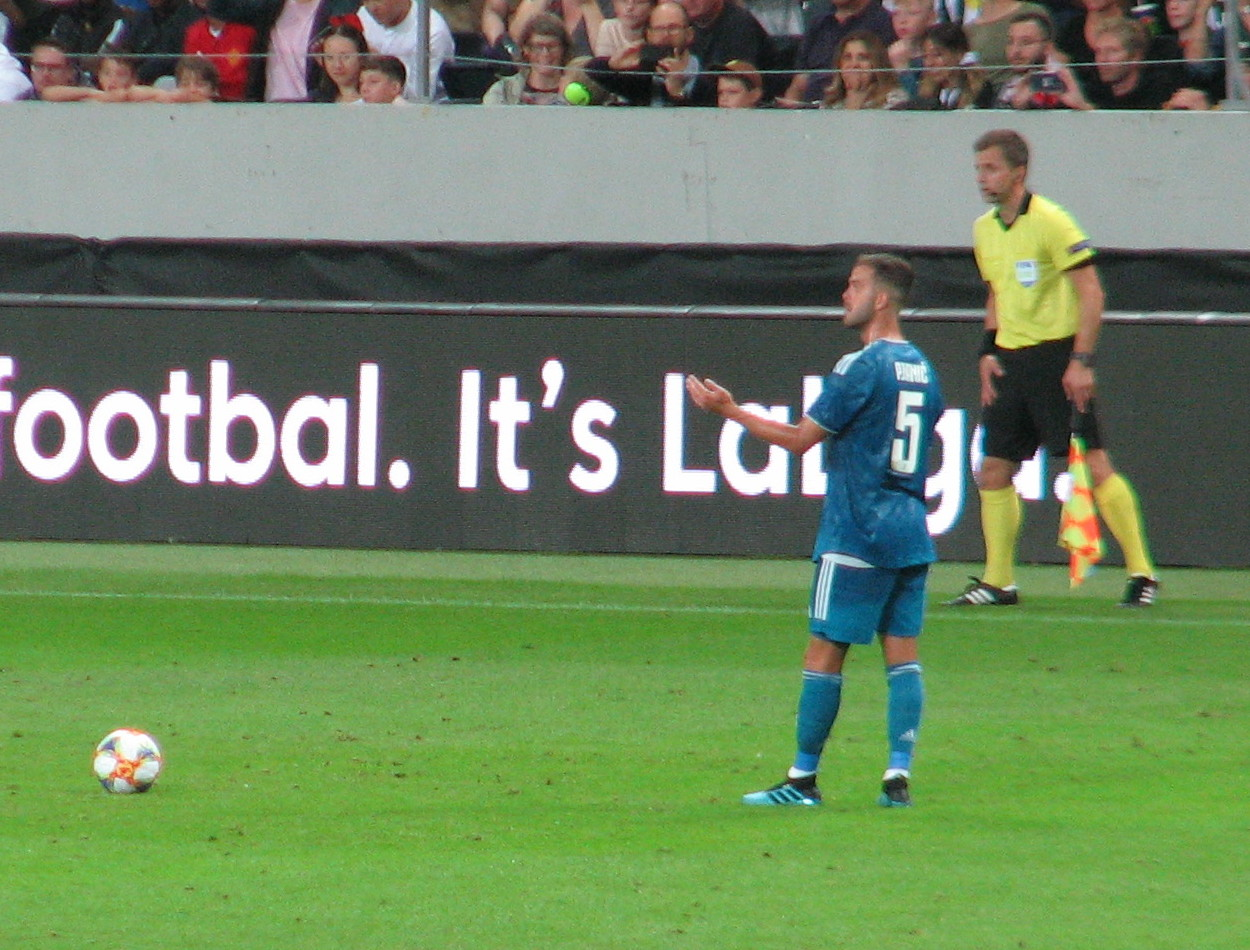
Pjanić attempts a free kick for Juventus in the 2019–20 preseason

Pjanić has been deployed primarily as a central midfielder or as a deep‑lying playmaker, though his tactical versatility has allowed him to operate in several midfield roles. His positional awareness and work rate enabled him to play both in more advanced central positions, including the Italian mezzala role, and occasionally as an attacking midfielder. He has also been used as a second striker on rare occasions.

Pjanić's main attributes were his range of passing, dribbling skills, and vision, which made him an excellent assist provider, and also enabled him to dictate the tempo of his team's play in midfield and orchestrate goalscoring opportunities for his teammates. Known for his eye for goal from midfield and striking ability from distance, Pjanić was also known for having the capacity to get into good scoring positions by making late attacking runs into the penalty area from behind. A renowned set-piece specialist, he was highly regarded for his accurate, bending free kicks, as well as his delivery from dead-ball situations; in 2015, he was described as the best free kick taker in the world by renowned set-piece specialist and former Lyon teammate Juninho. Pjanić's precocious talent, playmaking skills, and ability to score many goals from free kicks saw him labelled as a potential heir to Juninho at Lyon. However, despite his ability and the praise he has garnered from pundits, due to his elegant and creative playing style, Pjanić also drew criticism on occasion in the media for being inconsistent, while Livio Caferoglu of Football Italia accused him of being "too slight to impose himself as a defensive midfielder," and "too slow to release the ball."

== Personal life ==
Pjanić is a Muslim and an ethnic Bosniak. He has a son named Edin with his longtime girlfriend, Josepha from Nice. Along with his native Bosnian, Pjanić is fluent in six additional languages: Luxembourgish, French, English, German, Italian and Spanish. In 2014, Pjanić was enrolled at the University of Sarajevo, earning a degree in sport and physical education.

In 2009, while playing for Lyon, he stated: "I have followed Real Madrid since the days of Zidane and Ronaldo, when I fell in love. Since then, it is my preferred club and it always will be." Later, when he was a Roma player, he confirmed that he had been a fan of Real Madrid since his childhood.

Throughout the 2017–18 season, Pjanić appeared in the Netflix's docu-series First Team: Juventus.

== Career statistics ==
=== Club ===
Appearances and goals by club, season and competition
Club	Season	League			National cup (Note: Includes Coupe de France, Coppa Italia, Copa del Rey, Turkish Cup, UAE President's Cup, Russian Cup)		League cup (Note: Includes Coupe de la Ligue, UAE League Cup)		Continental		Other		Total	
Club	Season	Division	Apps	Goals	Apps	Goals	Apps	Goals	Apps	Goals	Apps	Goals	Apps	Goals
Metz	2007–08	Ligue 1	32	4	4	1	2	0	—		—		38	5
Lyon	2008–09	Ligue 1	20	0	2	0	0	0	1 (Note: Appearance(s) in UEFA Champions League)	0	1 (Note: Appearance in Trophée des Champions)	0	24	0
Lyon	2009–10	Ligue 1	37	6	0	0	2	0	14	5	—		53	11
Lyon	2010–11	Ligue 1	30	3	0	0	1	0	8	1	—		39	4
Lyon	2011–12	Ligue 1	3	1	0	0	0	0	2	0	—		5	1
Lyon	Total		90	10	2	0	3	0	25	6	1	0	121	16
Roma	2011–12	Serie A	30	3	1	0	—		—		—		31	3
Roma	2012–13	Serie A	27	3	2	1	—		—		—		29	4
Roma	2013–14	Serie A	35	6	3	0	—		—		—		38	6
Roma	2014–15	Serie A	34	5	2	0	—		10 (Note: Six appearances in UEFA Champions League, four appearances in UEFA Europa League)	0	—		46	5
Roma	2015–16	Serie A	33	10	1	0	—		7	2	—		41	12
Roma	Total		159	27	9	1	—		17	2	—		185	30
Juventus	2016–17	Serie A	30	5	4	2	—		12	1	1 (Note: Appearance in Supercoppa Italiana)	0	47	8
Juventus	2017–18	Serie A	31	5	4	1	—		8	1	1	0	44	7
Juventus	2018–19	Serie A	31	2	2	0	—		10	2	1	0	44	4
Juventus	2019–20	Serie A	30	3	4	0	—		8	0	1	0	43	3
Juventus	Total		122	15	14	3	—		38	4	4	0	178	22
Barcelona	2020–21	La Liga	19	0	1	0	—		8	0	2 (Note: Appearances in Supercopa de España)	0	30	0
Beşiktaş (loan)	2021–22	Süper Lig	20	0	2	0	—		3	0	1 (Note: Appearance in Turkish Super Cup)	0	26	0
Sharjah	2022–23	UAE Pro League	18	4	4	1	6	0	—		0	0	28	5
Sharjah	2023–24	UAE Pro League	23	0	2	0	1	0	7 (Note: Appearances in AFC Champions League)	0	1 (Note: Appearance in UAE Super Cup)	0	34	0
Sharjah	Total		41	4	6	1	7	0	7	0	1	0	62	5
CSKA Moscow	2024–25	Russian Premier League	16	0	9	0	—		—		—		25	0
Career total			499	60	47	6	12	0	98	12	9	0	665	78

=== International ===
Appearances and goals by national team and year
National team	Year	Apps	Goals
Bosnia and Herzegovina	2008	4	0
Bosnia and Herzegovina	2009	9	0
Bosnia and Herzegovina	2010	8	3
Bosnia and Herzegovina	2011	9	1
Bosnia and Herzegovina	2012	8	2
Bosnia and Herzegovina	2013	8	2
Bosnia and Herzegovina	2014	10	1
Bosnia and Herzegovina	2015	9	0
Bosnia and Herzegovina	2016	7	3
Bosnia and Herzegovina	2017	3	0
Bosnia and Herzegovina	2018	9	0
Bosnia and Herzegovina	2019	8	3
Bosnia and Herzegovina	2020	6	0
Bosnia and Herzegovina	2021	5	2
Bosnia and Herzegovina	2022	5	1
Bosnia and Herzegovina	2023	6	0
Bosnia and Herzegovina	2024	1	0
Total		115	18

Scores and results list Bosnia and Herzegovina's goal tally first

List of international goals scored by Miralem Pjanić
No.	Date	Venue	Opponent	Score	Result	Competition
1	3 March 2010	Koševo City Stadium, Sarajevo, Bosnia and Herzegovina	Ghana	2–1	2–1	Friendly
2	3 September 2010	Stade Josy Barthel, Luxembourg City, Luxembourg	Luxembourg	2–0	3–0	UEFA Euro 2012 qualifying
3	17 November 2010	Štadión Pasienky, Bratislava, Slovakia	Slovakia	2–1	3–2	Friendly
4	7 October 2011	Bilino Polje Stadium, Zenica, Bosnia and Herzegovina	Luxembourg	4–0	5–0	UEFA Euro 2012 qualifying
5	11 September 2012	Bilino Polje Stadium, Zenica, Bosnia and Herzegovina	Latvia	2–1	4–1	2014 FIFA World Cup qualification
6	16 October 2012	Bilino Polje Stadium, Zenica, Bosnia and Herzegovina	Lithuania	3–0	3–0	2014 FIFA World Cup qualification
7	6 February 2013	Stožice Stadium, Ljubljana, Slovenia	Slovenia	2–0	3–0	Friendly
8	7 June 2013	Skonto Stadium, Riga, Latvia	Latvia	4–0	5–0	2014 FIFA World Cup qualification
9	25 June 2014	Itaipava Arena Fonte Nova, Salvador, Brazil	Iran	2–0	3–1	2014 FIFA World Cup
10	25 March 2016	Stade Josy Barthel, Luxembourg City, Luxembourg	Luxembourg	3–0	3–0	Friendly
11	29 March 2016	Letzigrund, Zürich, Switzerland	Switzerland	2–0	2–0	Friendly
12	13 November 2016	Georgios Karaiskakis, Piraeus, Greece	Greece	1–0	1–1	2018 FIFA World Cup qualification
13	26 March 2019	Bilino Polje Stadium, Zenica, Bosnia and Herzegovina	Greece	2–0	2–2	UEFA Euro 2020 qualifying
14	12 October 2019	Bilino Polje Stadium, Zenica, Bosnia and Herzegovina	Finland	2–0	4–1	UEFA Euro 2020 qualifying
15	12 October 2019	Bilino Polje Stadium, Zenica, Bosnia and Herzegovina	Finland	3–0	4–1	UEFA Euro 2020 qualifying
16	24 March 2021	Helsinki Olympic Stadium, Helsinki, Finland	Finland	1–0	2–2	2022 FIFA World Cup qualification
17	7 September 2021	Bilino Polje Stadium, Zenica, Bosnia and Herzegovina	Kazakhstan	1–1	2–2	2022 FIFA World Cup qualification
18	14 June 2022	Bilino Polje Stadium, Zenica, Bosnia and Herzegovina	Finland	1–0	3–2	2022–23 UEFA Nations League B

== Honours ==
Juventus

- Serie A: 2016–17, 2017–18, 2018–19, 2019–20
- Coppa Italia: 2016–17, 2017–18
- Supercoppa Italiana: 2018
- UEFA Champions League runner-up: 2016–17

Barcelona

- Copa del Rey: 2020–21

Beşiktaş

- Turkish Super Cup: 2021

Sharjah

- UAE President's Cup: 2022–23
- UAE League Cup: 2022–23

CSKA Moscow

- Russian Cup: 2024–25

Individual

- Bosnian Footballer of the Year: 2014
- Serie A Team of the Year: 2015–16, 2016–17, 2017–18, 2018–19
- UEFA Champions League Team of the Season: 2016–17
- Globe Soccer Awards Player Career Award: 2019
- Bosnian Sportsman of the Year: 2020

== See also ==
- List of men's footballers with 100 or more international caps
