= Marquinho (footballer, born July 1986) =

Brazilian footballer

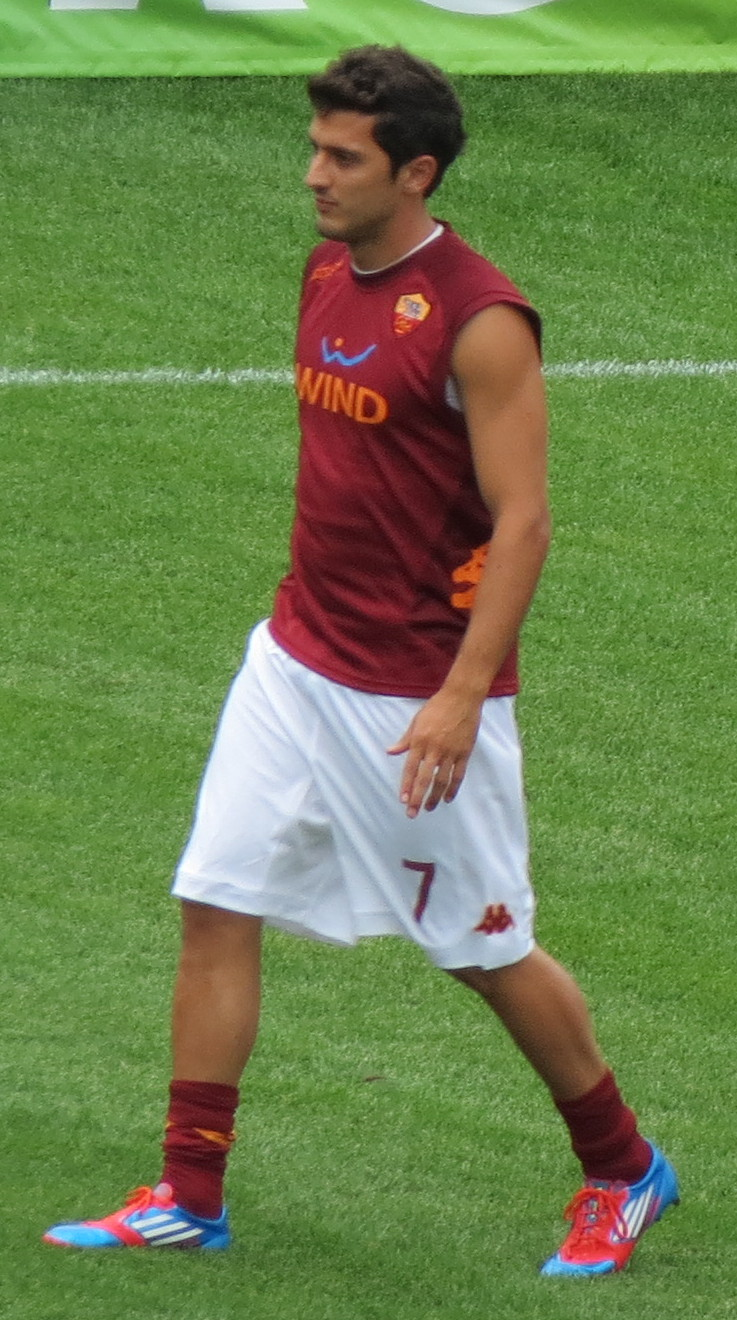
- Marquinho with Roma in 2012

Personal information
- Full name: Marco Antonio de Mattos Filho
- Date of birth: 3 July 1986 (age 40)
- Place of birth: Passo Fundo, Brazil
- Height: 1.82 m (6 ft 0 in)
- Position: Attacking midfielder

Youth career
- 1998: Gaúcho
- 1999: Juventude
- 2000: Internacional
- 2000: Grêmio
- 2001: Vasco
- 2001–2006: Palmeiras

Senior career*
Years	Team	Apps	(Gls)
2007	Palmeiras	1	(0)
2007	Botafogo	5	(0)
2008	Figueirense	26	(5)
2009–2011	Fluminense	128	(16)
2012–2015	Roma	52	(7)
2014	→ Verona (loan)	15	(2)
2014–2015	→ Al-Ittihad (loan)	26	(9)
2015–2016	Udinese	11	(0)
2016	→ Al-Ahli (loan)	13	(1)
2016–2018	Fluminense	33	(1)
2018–2019	Atlético Paranaense	14	(6)
2019–2020	Vasco da Gama	7	(0)
2020–2021	Figueirense	23	(1)
Total		356	(48)
- * Club domestic league appearances and goals

Marco Antonio de Mattos Filho (born 3 July 1986), commonly known as Marquinho, is a former Brazilian professional footballer. Mainly an attacking midfielder, he also played as a left wingback.

== Career ==
=== Brazil ===
Marquinho started his career at Gaúcho, playing for other Rio Grande do Sul-based youth clubs until he was transferred to Vasco da Gama and later to Palmeiras. During his time at Palmeiras, he was promoted to the first team in 2007 after his manager threatened not to renew Marquinho's contract since he acted only in Palmeiras B without first team opportunities.

His first game in the first team was on 18 January 2007 in a 4–2 win at Campeonato Paulista. He also played at Brasileirão against Goiás in August 2007 before moving to Botafogo. In 2008, after being discharged from the Rio de Janeiro club, he was signed by Figueirense, being a member of the starting eleven and moving to Fluminense the following year. At the end of 2009, after a long battle against relegation, Marquinho scored in the 1-1 away draw against Coritiba in the last league match, a result that kept Fluminense at Série A and relegated Coritiba to Série B. In 2010, he was part of the team that led Fluminense to win the national title after 26 years.

=== Roma ===
Marquinho moved to Roma on 31 January 2012 on a six-month loan. He made his debut on 19 February against Parma and scored his first goal on 1 April in a 5–2 win against Novara. He scored a goal against Udinese on 11 April 2012, and one more against Napoli two weeks later. At the end of a very impressive spell at Roma, they officially signed the midfielder for a reportedly €3 million from Fluminense.

He scored his first goal of the season against Inter on 2 September 2012 in a 3–1 victory. He scored his second goal of the season in a 4–2 loss against Cagliari. He finished the season with 26 appearances and 4 goals.

On 31 January 2014, Marquinho moved to league rivals Hellas Verona on loan for the remainder of the 2013–14 season.

=== Al-Ittihad ===
On 2 July 2014, the Jeddah-based team Ittihad FC announced the signing of Marquinho on a season long loan from A.S. Roma for undisclosed fee. He performs very well with Ittihad FC and scored 8 goals in 14 league matches. On 15 May 2015, following the derby match against Al-Ahli, Marquinho left Saudi Arabia.

=== Fluminense return ===
On 14 July 2016, Marquinho joined Fluminense on a three-year contract.

=== Atlético Paranaense ===
On 3 September 2018, Marquinho signed a contract with Atlético Paranaense until June 2019.

=== Vasco da Gama ===
In June 2019, Marquinho joined Vasco da Gama.

== Career statistics ==
Appearances and goals by club, season and competition
Club	Season	League			State league		National cup		League cup		Continental		Other		Total	
Club	Season	Division	Apps	Goals	Apps	Goals	Apps	Goals	Apps	Goals	Apps	Goals	Apps	Goals	Apps	Goals
Palmeiras	2007	Série A	1	0	2	0	—		—		—		—		3	0
Botafogo	2007	Série A	5	0	—		—		—		0	0	—		5	0
Figueirense	2008	Série A	26	5	0	0	—		—		—		—		32	0
Fluminense	2009	Série A	31	1	10	0	7	0	—		9	1	—		57	2
Fluminense	2010	Série A	30	4	10	3	6	0	—		—		—		46	7
Fluminense	2011	Série A	33	4	14	4	0	0	—		5	1	—		52	9
Fluminense	Total		94	9	34	7	13	0	—		14	2	—		157	18
Roma	2011–12	Serie A	15	3	—		—		—		—		—		15	3
Roma	2012–13	Serie A	26	4	—		4	0	—		—		—		30	4
Roma	2013–14	Serie A	11	0	—		0	0	—		—		—		11	0
Roma	Total		52	7	—		4	0	—		—		—		56	7
Verona (loan)	2013–14	Serie A	15	2	—		—		—		—		—		15	2
Al-Ittihad (loan)	2014–15	Saudi Pro League	26	9	—		3	2	1	1	2	0	—		32	12
Udinese	2015–16	Serie A	11	0	—		2	0	—		—		—		13	0
Al-Ahli (loan)	2015–16	Saudi Pro League	13	1	—		4	2	1	0	6	1	—		24	4
Fluminense	2016	Série A	16	1	—		2	1	—		—		—		18	2
Fluminense	2017	Série A	4	0	13	0	2	0	—		1	0	3	1	23	1
Fluminense	Total		20	1	13	0	4	1	—		1	0	3	1	41	3
Atlético Paranaense	2019	Série A	—		14	6	—		—		—		—		14	6
Vasco da Gama	2019	Série A	7	0	—		—		—		—		—		7	0
Figueirense	2020	Série B	18	0	5	1	3	0	—		—		—		26	1
Career total			288	34	68	14	33	5	2	1	23	3	3	1	417	58

== Honours ==
Figueirense

- Campeonato Catarinense: 2008

Fluminense

- Campeonato Brasileiro Série A: 2010

Al-Ahli

- Saudi Professional League: 2015–16
- King Cup: 2016
