= Stefan Strandberg =

Norwegian footballer (born 1990)

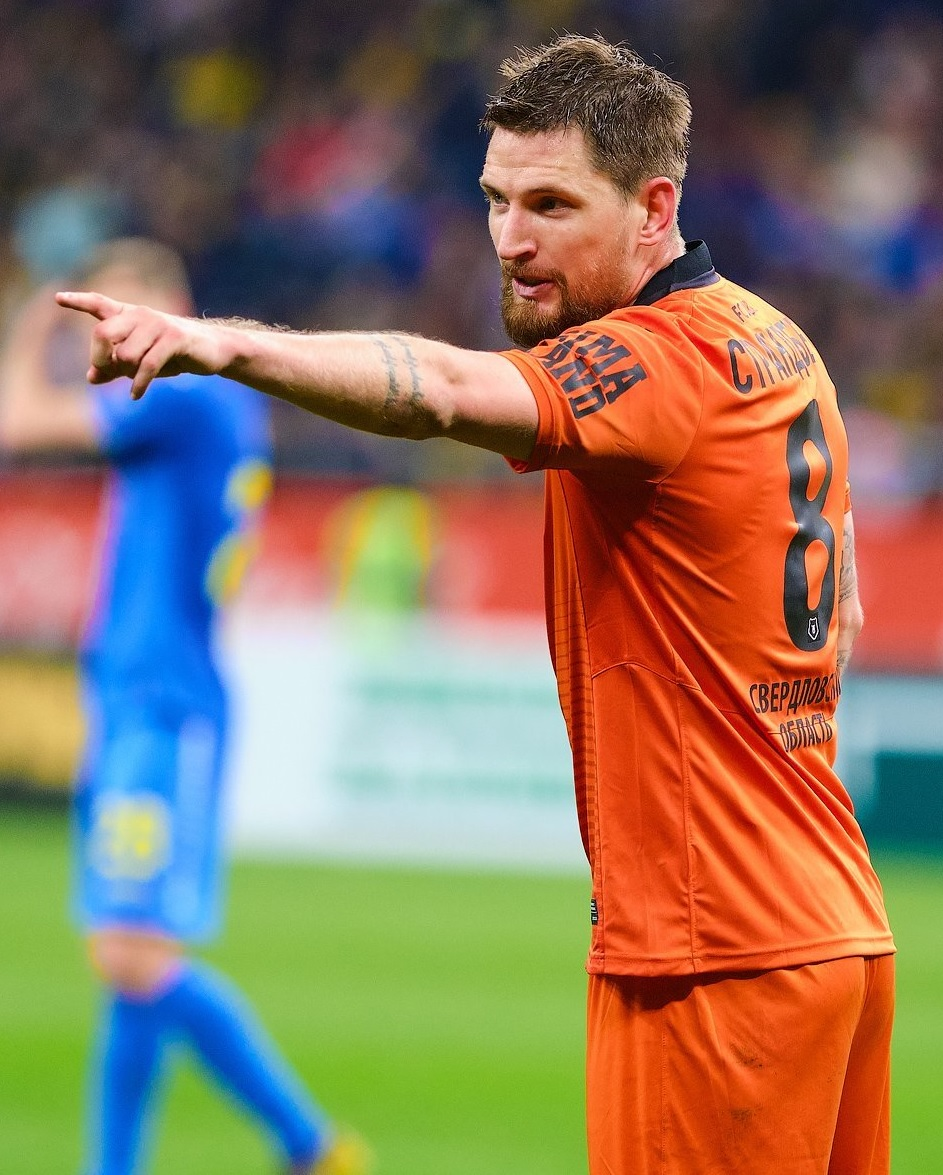
- Strandberg with Ural Yekaterinburg in 2019

Personal information
- Full name: Ken Remi Stefan Strandberg
- Date of birth: 25 July 1990 (age 36)
- Place of birth: Lyngdal Municipality, Norway
- Height: 1.89 m (6 ft 2 in)
- Position: Defender

Youth career
- Lyngdal

Senior career*
| Years | Team | Apps | (Gls) |
| 2006–2008 | Mandalskameratene | 32 | (2) |
| 2009–2012 | Vålerenga | 59 | (2) |
| 2009 | → Bryne (loan) | 4 | (0) |
| 2012–2015 | Rosenborg | 109 | (4) |
| 2015–2019 | Krasnodar | 16 | (0) |
| 2016–2017 | → Hannover 96 (loan) | 12 | (0) |
| 2018 | → Krasnodar-2 | 5 | (0) |
| 2019 | → Ural Yekaterinburg (loan) | 10 | (0) |
| 2019–2020 | Trapani | 12 | (0) |
| 2020–2021 | Ural Yekaterinburg | 17 | (1) |
| 2021–2022 | Salernitana | 11 | (0) |
| 2022–2024 | Vålerenga | 31 | (4) |

International career^{‡}
| 2006 | Norway U-16 | 3 | (0) |
| 2008 | Norway U-18 | 3 | (1) |
| 2009 | Norway U-19 | 4 | (0) |
| 2010–2013 | Norway U-21 | 25 | (1) |
| 2014–2015 | Norway U-23 | 2 | (2) |
| 2013–2023 | Norway | 36 | (1) |

Managerial career
- 2025–: Norway U-21 (assistant)
- * Club domestic league appearances and goals as of 5 December 2023 ‡ National team caps and goals as of 15 October 2023

Ken Remi Stefan Strandberg (born 25 July 1990) is a former Norwegian professional footballer who plays as a defender.

Hailing from Lyngdal Municipality, Strandberg started his senior career for Mandalskameratene before he moved to Vålerenga in 2009. After three seasons with the Oslo-based club, he joined Rosenborg ahead of the 2012 season.

Strandberg has represented Norway from under-15 to senior level, and was the captain of the under-21 team that got a bronze medal in the 2013 UEFA European Under-21 Football Championship. He was also picked for team of the tournament, with the likes of; David de Gea, Alberto Moreno, Marc Bartra, Asier Illarramendi, Isco, Koke, Thiago Alcântara, Marco Verratti, Álvaro Morata, Fabio Borini and Luuk de Jong.

== Club career ==
Strandberg was born in Lyngdal Municipality and played for Lyngdal IL until he moved to Mandalskameratene in 2006 where he made his debut for the senior team at the age of 15. He played three seasons for Mandalskameratene, and made eight appearances in the First Division when the club had a spell in the second-tier league in 2007.

Strandberg signed a four-year contract with the Tippeligaen side Vålerenga in January 2009. He was loaned out to Bryne FK in July 2009, as a replacement for the injured Christian Gauseth. Strandberg played four matches for the First Division side during the summer, before he returned to Vålerenga. He made his Tippeligaen-debut on 12 September 2009 when he replaced Mohammed Fellah 11 minutes before full-time in the match against Fredrikstad. He has previously had trials with clubs such as; Derby, Portsmouth and VfB Stuttgart. Vålerenga sold Strandberg, who had one year left of his contract, to their rivals Rosenborg ahead of the 2012 season.

On 26 August 2016, he joined Hannover 96 on loan from FC Krasnodar for the rest of the 2016–17 season.

On 17 January 2019, he joined another Russian club FC Ural Yekaterinburg on loan until the end of the 2018–19 season.

On 13 December 2019, he joined Italian Serie B club Trapani until the end of the 2019–20 season.

On 1 September 2020, he returned to Ural Yekaterinburg. He left Ural on 8 June 2021 as his contract expired.

On 23 July 2021, he signed a one-year contract with Italian club Salernitana. If certain performance conditions were met, the contract would be automatically renewed for another year.

== International career ==
Strandberg first represented his country at under-15 level, where he played two matches in 2005. The following year, he played three matches for the under-16 team. He scored one goal in the matches for the under-18 team in 2008, before he played four matches for the under-19 team the next year. He made his debut for the under-21 team when he replaced Harmeet Singh after 78 minutes in the match against Hungary U21 on 28 May 2010. He later became a regular on the under-21 team, and was the captain of the team that qualified for the 2013 UEFA European Under-21 Football Championship.

Strandberg was called up for the Norwegian squad for the 2012 King's Cup, but had to withdraw due to an injury and was replaced by Thomas Drage. Strandberg was also called up for senior squad for the friendly matches against South Africa and Zambia in January 2013, but had to withdraw from the squad due to a surgery in the hip.

== Career statistics ==
=== Club ===
As of match played 17 November 2022

Appearances and goals by club, season and competition
| Club | Season | League | | | National Cup | | Continental | | Total | |
| Club | Season | Division | Apps | Goals | Apps | Goals | Apps | Goals | Apps | Goals |
|---|---|---|---|---|---|---|---|---|---|---|
| Mandalskameratene | 2006 | 2. Division | 20 | 2 | 3 | 0 | – | | 23 | 2 |
| Mandalskameratene | 2007 | Adeccoligaen | 8 | 0 | 0 | 0 | – | | 8 | 0 |
| Mandalskameratene | 2008 | 2. Division | 4 | 0 | 2 | 0 | – | | 8 | 0 |
| Mandalskameratene | Total | | 32 | 2 | 5 | 0 | 0 | 0 | 37 | 2 |
| Vålerenga | 2009 | Tippeligaen | 5 | 0 | 2 | 0 | – | | 7 | 0 |
| Vålerenga | 2010 | Tippeligaen | 28 | 1 | 1 | 0 | – | | 29 | 1 |
| Vålerenga | 2011 | Tippeligaen | 26 | 1 | 2 | 1 | 4 | 0 | 32 | 2 |
| Vålerenga | Total | | 59 | 2 | 5 | 1 | 4 | 0 | 68 | 3 |
| Bryne (loan) | 2009 | Adeccoligaen | 4 | 0 | 0 | 0 | – | | 4 | 0 |
| Rosenborg | 2012 | Tippeligaen | 23 | 2 | 3 | 1 | 10 | 0 | 36 | 3 |
| Rosenborg | 2013 | Tippeligaen | 23 | 1 | 6 | 0 | 2 | 0 | 31 | 1 |
| Rosenborg | 2014 | Tippeligaen | 20 | 1 | 2 | 0 | 5 | 0 | 27 | 1 |
| Rosenborg | 2015 | Tippeligaen | 13 | 0 | 2 | 0 | – | | 15 | 0 |
| Rosenborg | Total | | 79 | 4 | 13 | 1 | 17 | 0 | 109 | 5 |
| Krasnodar | 2015–16 | Russian Premier League | 15 | 0 | 0 | 0 | 8 | 0 | 23 | 0 |
| Krasnodar | 2016–17 | Russian Premier League | 1 | 0 | 0 | 0 | 2 | 0 | 3 | 0 |
| Krasnodar | 2017–18 | Russian Premier League | 0 | 0 | 0 | 0 | – | | 0 | 0 |
| Krasnodar | Total | | 16 | 0 | 0 | 0 | 10 | 0 | 26 | 0 |
| Hannover 96 (loan) | 2016–17 | 2. Bundesliga | 12 | 0 | 1 | 0 | – | | 13 | 0 |
| Ural (loan) | 2018–19 | Russian Premier League | 10 | 0 | 3 | 0 | – | | 13 | 0 |
| Trapani | 2019–20 | Serie B | 12 | 0 | 0 | 0 | – | | 12 | 0 |
| Ural | 2020–21 | Russian Premier League | 17 | 1 | 1 | 0 | – | | 18 | 1 |
| Salernitana | 2021–22 | Serie A | 11 | 0 | 1 | 0 | – | | 12 | 0 |
| Vålerenga | 2022 | Eliteserien | 6 | 1 | 0 | 0 | – | | 6 | 1 |
| Vålerenga | 2023 | Eliteserien | 20 | 3 | 1 | 0 | – | | 21 | 4 |
| Vålerenga | Total | | 26 | 4 | 1 | 0 | 0 | 0 | 27 | 4 |
| Career total | | | 274 | 13 | 33 | 2 | 31 | 0 | 335 | 15 |

=== International ===
As of 15 October 2023

Appearances and goals by national team and year
| National team | Year | Apps | Goals |
|---|---|---|---|
| Norway | 2013 | 1 | 0 |
| Norway | 2014 | 2 | 0 |
| Norway | 2015 | 1 | 0 |
| Norway | 2016 | 6 | 0 |
| Norway | 2017 | 1 | 0 |
| Norway | 2018 | 0 | 0 |
| Norway | 2019 | 0 | 0 |
| Norway | 2020 | 3 | 0 |
| Norway | 2021 | 10 | 1 |
| Norway | 2022 | 6 | 0 |
| Norway | 2023 | 7 | 0 |
| Total | | 36 | 1 |

Scores and results list Norway's goal tally first, score column indicates score after each Strandberg goal.

List of international goals scored by Stefan Strandberg
| No. | Date | Venue | Opponent | Score | Result | Competition |
|---|---|---|---|---|---|---|
| 1 | 6 June 2021 | La Rosaleda Stadium, Málaga, Spain | Greece | 1–2 | 1–2 | Friendly |

== Honours ==
Individual

- UEFA U-21 Championship Team of the Tournament: 2013
