= Devis Mangia =

Football manager

Personal information
- Date of birth: 6 June 1974 (age 52)
- Place of birth: Cernusco sul Naviglio, Italy

Team information
- Current team: Campobasso (head coach)

Youth career
- Years: Team
- –1994: Enotria

Managerial career
- 2004–2007: Varese
- 2007–2008: Tritium
- 2008–2009: Ivrea
- 2009–2010: Valenzana
- 2011: Palermo
- 2012–2013: Italy U21
- 2013–2014: Spezia
- 2014: Bari
- 2015–2016: Ascoli
- 2017–2019: Universitatea Craiova
- 2019–2022: Malta
- 2025–2026: Team Altamura
- 2026–: Campobasso
Medal record
Men's football
Representing Italy (as coach)
UEFA European Under-21 Championship
Runner-up	2013

Devis Mangia (Italian pronunciation: [ˈdɛːviz ˈmandʒa]; born 6 June 1974) is an Italian professional football manager who is the head coach of Serie C Group B club Campobasso.

== Managerial career ==
=== Early years ===
Mangia started his coaching career at age 30, working alongside Sean Sogliano at Eccellenza club Varese and leading them to two promotions and back into professionalism in three years. He successively worked at Serie D and Serie C2 clubs from Northern Italy, such as Tritium, Ivrea and Valenzana. In 2010, he returned to Varese, this time as youth coach, and guided a team composed of unknown youngsters to a spot in the Campionato Nazionale Primavera final.

=== Palermo ===
In June 2011, Mangia agreed to follow director of football Sean Sogliano at Palermo, accepting a job offer as head of the under-19 team at the Sicilian club in place of Paolo Beruatto.

Later on 31 August, Mangia was surprisingly appointed as temporary head coach following the dismissal of Stefano Pioli, under recommendation by Sogliano; despite not having the required coaching badges, he was allowed to serve as head coach due to having been admitted to the national 2011–12 UEFA Pro license course. His first game in charge of team duties, played on 11 September against European powerhouse Internazionale saw Palermo, now switched to a brand-new 4–4–2 tactical disposition, achieving an astonishing 4–3 win, thanks to a brace from captain Fabrizio Miccoli. Under Mangia's tenure, Palermo significantly improved and achieved three wins and ten points in the first five Serie A games, including a consecutive two games with a clean sheet, a relevant feat for what was the second-worst defence in the previous season; such results, together with the strict relationship between Mangia and director of football Sean Sogliano and Delio Rossi's confirmed refusal of a Palermo comeback, led the press to speculate about the possibility of him being offered a new contract as permanent head coach. Despite Sogliano's resignation as director of football on 2 November 2011, Mangia was then eventually offered a two-year contract as head coach, which he signed on 4 November 2011. On 19 December 2011, he was sacked from his position after the 2-0 derby defeat to Sicilian rivals, Catania the day before, along with assistant coach Onofrio Barone.

=== Italy U21 ===
Devis Mangia has been hired as Italy's under-21 coach, replacing Ciro Ferrara. Mangia described the job as "one of the most prestigious in Italian football" and says "it is a sign of great esteem and responsibility, I'm really happy". Mangia has vowed to follow the model of Italy's senior team coach Cesare Prandelli, who guided the Azzurri to the 2012 UEFA European Football Championship final.

He guided the Azzurrini to qualification to the 2013 UEFA European Under-21 Championship, where the Italian team made it to the final, where they were ultimately defeated 4–2 by Spain. He stepped down from his role after the end of the tournament.

=== Spezia, Bari ===
On 16 December 2013, Mangia was named new head coach of ambitious Serie B club Spezia, guiding them to eighth place and qualification to the promotion playoffs, where they were defeated 1–0 by Modena in the first preliminary round and thus eliminated.

He successively left Spezia to become the new head coach of Serie B promotion hopefuls Bari for the 2014–15 season, but was sacked on 16 November 2014 due to poor results.

=== Universitatea Craiova ===
On 23 May 2017, Mangia was named new head coach of Romanian team Universitatea Craiova. On 14 October, he was named "Coach of the First Half of the Season" by LPF. On 27 May 2018, Universitatea won the Romanian Cup.

=== Malta national team ===
On 30 December 2019, the Malta Football Association announced the appointment of Devis Mangia as national teams' head coach. Mangia signed a contract until 31 December 2023. Under his leadership, Malta's national team achieved the longest undefeated streak in its history (seven matches) between 6 September 2020 and 24 March 2021.

On 27 September 2022, Mangia was temporarily suspended by the Malta Football Association after allegedly having made sexual advances on a player in the Malta squad. A few days later, the Malta Football Association announced to have referred the case to the local police for investigation. On 7 November 2022, Mangia resigned from his position as head coach, while denying the allegations.

=== Team Altamura ===
On 4 July 2025, after nearly three years without a job and almost ten years outside of Italy, Mangia was unveiled as the new head coach of Serie C club Team Altamura.

== Managerial statistics ==
As of match played 27 September 2022

Managerial record by team and tenure
Team	Nat	From	To	Record				
Team	Nat	From	To	P	W	D	L	Win %
Varese	(Italy)	1 July 2004	14 June 2007	124	60	41	23	48.39
Tritium	(Italy)	14 June 2007	3 June 2008	42	23	12	7	54.76
Ivrea	(Italy)	4 June 2008	28 April 2009	35	11	10	14	31.43
Valenzana	(Italy)	4 November 2009	19 May 2010	23	8	9	6	34.78
Palermo	(Italy)	31 August 2011	19 December 2011	17	7	2	8	41.18
Italy U21	(Italy)	18 July 2012	2 July 2013	14	10	1	3	71.43
Spezia	(Italy)	16 December 2013	23 June 2014	26	10	8	8	38.46
Bari	(Italy)	7 July 2014	16 November 2014	16	5	4	7	31.25
Ascoli	(Italy)	4 November 2015	10 May 2016	29	10	6	13	34.48
Universitatea Craiova	(Romania)	23 May 2017	15 April 2019	82	40	20	22	48.78
Malta	(Malta)	30 December 2019	7 November 2022	28	10	5	13	35.71
Total				436	194	118	124	44.50

== Honours ==
=== Coach ===
Varese

- Serie D: 2005–06

Universitatea Craiova

- Cupa României: 2017–18
- Supercupa României runner-up: 2018

Italy U21

- UEFA European Under-21 Championship runner-up: 2013
