= Alessandro Florenzi =

Italian association football player (born 1991)

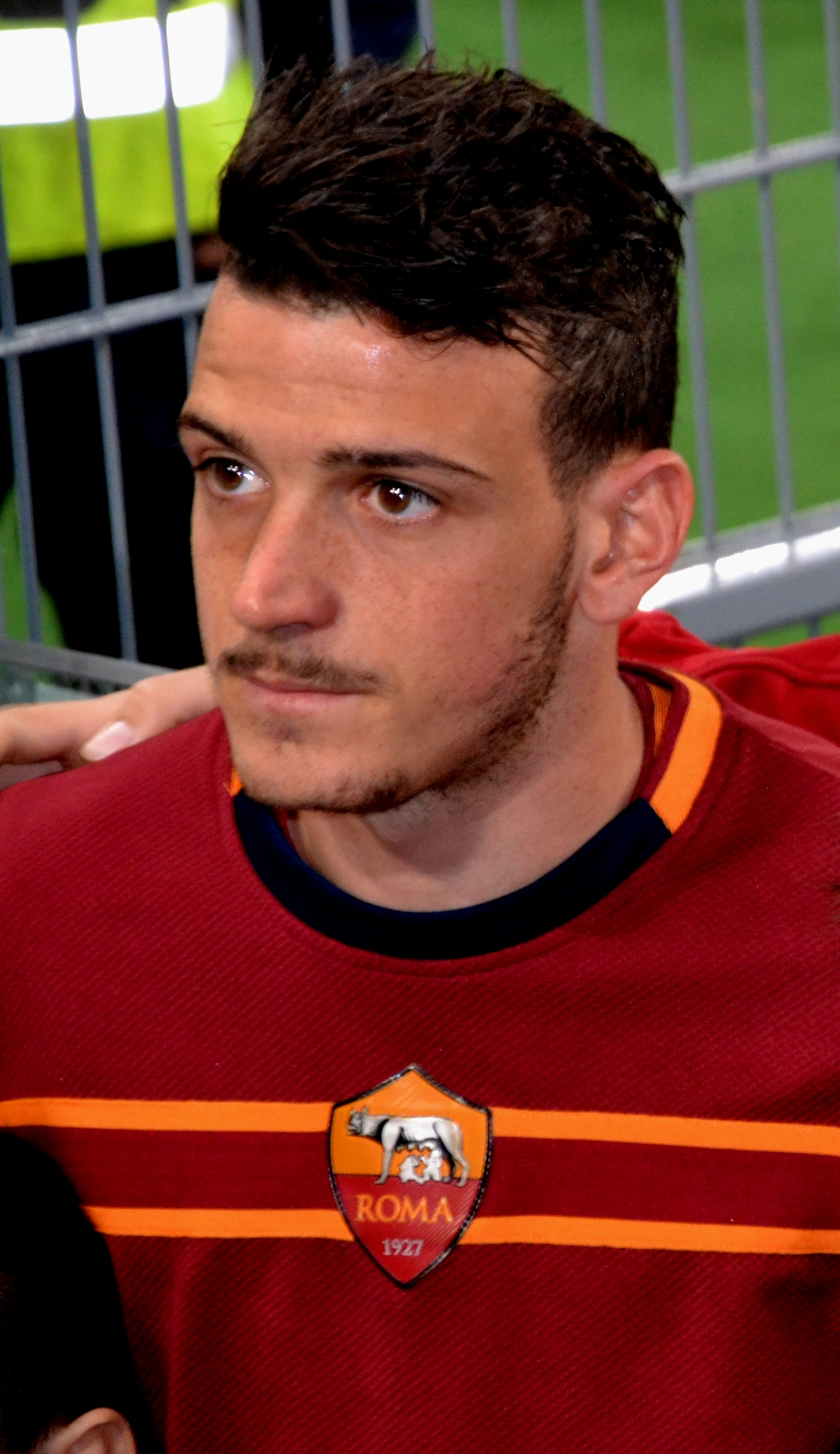
- Florenzi with Roma in 2014

Personal information
- Date of birth: 11 March 1991 (age 35)
- Place of birth: Rome, Italy
- Height: 1.73 m (5 ft 8 in)
- Position: Full-back

Youth career
- 1995–2000: Atletico Acilia
- 2000–2002: Lodigiani
- 2002–2011: Roma

Senior career*
Years	Team	Apps	(Gls)
2011–2022	Roma	227	(25)
2011–2012	→ Crotone (loan)	35	(11)
2020	→ Valencia (loan)	12	(0)
2020–2021	→ Paris Saint-Germain (loan)	21	(2)
2021–2022	→ AC Milan (loan)	24	(2)
2022–2025	AC Milan	38	(1)
Total		357	(41)

International career
2011	Italy U20	4	(0)
2011–2013	Italy U21	18	(5)
2012–2022	Italy	49	(2)
Medal record
Men's Football
Representing Italy
UEFA European Championship
Winner	2020 Europe
CONMEBOL–UEFA Cup of Champions
Runner-up	2022 England
- * Club domestic league appearances and goals

Alessandro Florenzi Cavaliere OMRI (born 11 March 1991) is an Italian former professional footballer who played as a full-back.

Florenzi started his professional club career with Roma in 2011, but spent the 2011–12 season on loan with Crotone. Florenzi was appointed as Roma's new captain following the departure of Daniele De Rossi in 2019. He later had spells on loan with Spanish side Valencia, and French side Paris Saint-Germain, winning the Trophée des Champions and the Coupe de France with the latter club during the 2020–21 season.

At international level, he was a member of the Italy national under-21 football team that finished second in the 2013 UEFA European Under-21 Championship, before making his senior debut for Italy in 2012. He went on to represent Italy at UEFA Euro 2016 and UEFA Euro 2020, winning the latter tournament, and reached the finals of the Finalissima in 2022.

== Club career ==
=== Roma ===
A product of Roma youth academy, Florenzi made his Serie A debut in a 3–1 win against Sampdoria on 22 May 2011, replacing Francesco Totti as a substitute.

==== Loan to Crotone ====
During the summer of 2011, Florenzi was sent on loan to Serie B club Crotone. He made his debut on 27 August 2011, scoring their goal in a 2–1 home defeat against Livorno. On 22 June 2012, Crotone exercised the option in the loan contract to buy half of the registration rights for €250,000. On 6 July, Roma bought back half of the registration rights for €1.25 million.

==== Return to Roma ====
Florenzi made his first appearance of the 2012–13 Serie A season as a second-half substitute in the 2–2 draw against Catania on 26 August 2012. He made his first start in the 3–1 victory against Internazionale the following week, also scoring his first-ever goal for Roma. Florenzi ended his first full season with the Roma first team, making 36 Serie A appearances and scoring three goals. On 31 July 2013, Florenzi scored and assisted a goal in a 3–1 over the MLS All-stars in the 2013 MLS All-Star Game, and was named the MLS All-Star Game MVP.

During the 2013–14 Serie A season, Florenzi helped guide Roma to a second-place finish and a return to Champions League football for the first time since the 2010–11 season. Florenzi also featured in all ten of Roma's victories from the start of the season, a Serie A record, scoring against Livorno, Parma, Bologna and Inter during the run. On 12 January 2014, Florenzi scored a fantastic, bicycle kick goal to open the scoring in Roma's 4–0 victory against Genoa. Florenzi played in 36 of Roma's 38 Serie A fixtures during the season.

Florenzi made his first appearance of the 2014–15 Serie A season on 30 August 2014 as a second-half substitute in the 2–0 victory against Fiorentina. He then started the 0–1 away victory against Empoli on 13 September. Florenzi made his Champions League debut as a substitute for the injured Juan Iturbe in the 5–1 group stage victory against CSKA Moscow on 17 September. Florenzi scored his first goal of the season as Roma won 2–0 against Cagliari, having set up Mattia Destro for the opener.

On 16 September 2015, Florenzi scored the tying goal from 50 yards out against reigning champions, Barcelona when he spotted the goalkeeper at the edge of his box during the group stage of the Champions League, resulting in a 1–1 draw. The goal was later named one of the three final nominees for the 2015 FIFA Puskás Award.

On 26 October 2016, Florenzi suffered an anterior cruciate ligament injury in his left knee during Roma's 3–1 away win against Sassuolo, causing him to be out for at least four months. On 17 February 2017, Florenzi was ruled out for the rest of the season after suffering a further tear of the same ligament in his first week back in training. On 16 September 2017, he made his return in Roma's 3–0 home victory over Hellas Verona.

==== Loan to Valencia ====
On 30 January 2020, Florenzi was loaned to Valencia CF until 30 June 2020.

==== Loan to Paris Saint-Germain ====
On 11 September 2020, Florenzi joined Ligue 1 club Paris Saint-Germain on a season-long loan with an option to buy. He was given the number 24 shirt. Two days later, he made his debut for PSG in a 0–1 loss against Marseille. On 2 October 2020, Florenzi scored his first goal at the Parisian club, in a match against Angers that ended in a 6–1 victory.

On 19 May 2021, Florenzi started for PSG in their 2–0 win over Monaco in the 2021 Coupe de France Final. His loan ended on 30 June 2021, and he returned to Roma effectively.

==== Loan to AC Milan: Scudetto Triumph ====
On 21 August 2021, AC Milan announced the signing of Florenzi from Roma on an initial loan deal, with the option to make the transfer permanent. Florenzi signed for the team until 30 June 2022. On First of October, Florenzi underwent surgery to his partially torn medial meniscus in his left knee. He was back on the pitch almost after 2 months against Fiorentina.

He scored his first goal for Milan on 22 December against Empoli in eventual 4–2 win, it was also his first goal from a free-kick in Serie A. On 6 April 2022, he underwent a surgery on his left knee to repair the internal meniscus. On 8 May against Verona, he played his first match since the injury, coming on as a substitute and scoring the third in 3–1 win for Milan. In total, Florenzi played 30 matches for Milan this season, scoring 2 goals, contributing to the club's 19th Scudetto; it was Florenzi's first Serie A title.

=== AC Milan ===
On 1 July 2022, AC Milan announced the signing of Florenzi from Roma on a permanent basis, signing a three-year contract with the club lasting until 30 June 2025. He suffered a hamstring injury in early September 2022, and was successfully operated by surgeon Lasse Lempainen in Turku, Finland.

On 28 July 2024, during the friendly match against Manchester City, at Yankee Stadium in the Bronx in New York City, Florenzi suffered a severe injury and was stretchered off. Subsequent medical tests revealed a ruptured cruciate ligament and lateral meniscus in his right knee.

On 6 January 2025, Milan won the final of the 2024–25 Supercoppa Italiana 3–2 against Inter Milan in Riyadh, Florenzi's first time winning the Supercoppa Italiana. On 24 May, he made his final appearance for Milan in a 2–0 home victory against Monza. He officially departed Milan on 30 June 2025 upon the expiration of his contract, becoming a free agent.

On 27 August 2025, Florenzi announced his retirement from professional football at the age of 34.

== International career ==
On 14 November 2012, Florenzi made his debut for the senior team under coach Cesare Prandelli in a friendly match against France. He was part of the Italy under-21 squad for the 2013 UEFA European Under-21 Championship in Israel, as the Azzurrini reached the final in a 4–2 loss against Spain. His only goal of the tournament came in the 4–0 group stage victory against the host nation.

On 15 October 2013, Florenzi scored his first senior goal on his competitive debut in a World Cup qualifying match against Armenia that ended in a 2–2 draw at the Stadio San Paolo in Naples. Florenzi was not included in the 30-man preliminary squad named by Cesare Prandelli for the 2014 FIFA World Cup.

On 30 August 2014, new Italy head coach Antonio Conte named Florenzi in his first squad for the upcoming European qualifying matches. On 31 May 2016, he was named to Conte's 23-man Italy squad for UEFA Euro 2016.

In June 2021, he was included in Italy's squad for UEFA Euro 2020 by manager Roberto Mancini. On 11 July, Florenzi won the European Championship with Italy following a 3–2 penalty shoot-out victory against England at Wembley Stadium in the final, after a 1–1 draw in extra-time – where he replaced Emerson Palmieri in the second half.

== Style of play ==
Florenzi was a tenacious, tactically intelligent and well-rounded player who was highly versatile. Although initially he was usually deployed as a central midfielder, in the "mezzala" role, he is a box-to-box player capable of playing anywhere in midfield, and he had also been deployed as a winger, and even as an attacking full-back or wing-back on either flank throughout his career, although he favoured the right side. Florenzi was a quick, energetic and hard-working player who was effective at aiding his team both offensively and defensively due to his pace and stamina; when used in more offensive midfield roles, he had also demonstrated an aptitude for making offensive runs. He was gifted with good technical skills, distribution, and crossing ability, and despite his small stature, he was effective in the air; he was also a good striker of the ball, and an accurate set-piece taker. Florenzi has cited former midfielder Cesc Fàbregas as his role model.

== Career statistics ==
=== Club ===
Appearances and goals by club, season and competition
Club	Season	League			National cup (Note: Includes Coppa Italia, Copa del Rey, Coupe de France)		Continental		Other		Total	
Club	Season	Division	Apps	Goals	Apps	Goals	Apps	Goals	Apps	Goals	Apps	Goals
Roma	2010–11	Serie A	1	0	0	0	0	0	0	0	1	0
Roma	2012–13	Serie A	36	3	3	1	—		—		39	4
Roma	2013–14	Serie A	38	6	4	0	—		—		42	6
Roma	2014–15	Serie A	35	5	1	0	9 (Note: Six appearances in UEFA Champions League, three appearances in UEFA Europa League)	0	—		45	5
Roma	2015–16	Serie A	33	7	1	0	8 (Note: Appearance(s) in UEFA Champions League)	1	—		42	8
Roma	2016–17	Serie A	9	0	0	0	4 (Note: One appearance in UEFA Champions League, three appearances and one goal in UEFA Europa League)	1	—		13	1
Roma	2017–18	Serie A	32	1	0	0	10	0	—		42	1
Roma	2018–19	Serie A	29	3	1	0	8	0	—		38	3
Roma	2019–20	Serie A	14	0	2	0	2 (Note: Appearance(s) in UEFA Europa League)	0	—		18	0
Roma	Total		227	25	12	1	36	2	0	0	280	28
Crotone (loan)	2011–12	Serie B	35	11	2	0	—		—		37	11
Valencia (loan)	2019–20	La Liga	12	0	1	0	1	0	—		14	0
Paris Saint-Germain (loan)	2020–21	Ligue 1	21	2	4	0	10	0	1 (Note: Appearance in Trophée des Champions)	0	36	2
Milan (loan)	2021–22	Serie A	24	2	2	0	4	0	—		30	2
Milan	2022–23	Serie A	6	0	0	0	0	0	0	0	6	0
Milan	2023–24	Serie A	31	1	1	0	8 (Note: Four appearances in UEFA Champions League, four appearances in UEFA Europa League)	0	—		40	1
Milan	2024–25	Serie A	1	0	0	0	0	0	0	0	1	0
Milan	Total		62	3	3	0	12	0	0	0	77	3
Career total			357	41	22	1	59	2	1	0	444	44

=== International ===
Appearances and goals by national team and year
National team	Year	Apps	Goals
Italy	2012	1	0
Italy	2013	3	1
Italy	2014	3	0
Italy	2015	6	1
Italy	2016	11	0
Italy	2017	1	0
Italy	2018	6	0
Italy	2019	4	0
Italy	2020	5	0
Italy	2021	6	0
Italy	2022	3	0
Total		49	2

Italt score listed first, score column indicates score after each Florenzi goal

List of international goals scored by Alessandro Florenzi
No.	Date	Venue	Opponent	Score	Result	Competition
1	15 October 2013	Stadio San Paolo, Naples, Italy	Armenia	1–1	2–2	2014 FIFA World Cup qualification
2	13 October 2015	Stadio Olimpico, Rome, Italy	Norway	1–1	2–1	UEFA Euro 2016 qualifying

== Honours ==
Paris Saint-Germain

- Coupe de France: 2020–21
- Trophée des Champions: 2020

AC Milan

- Serie A: 2021–22
- Supercoppa Italiana: 2024–25; runner-up: 2022
- Coppa Italia runner-up: 2024–25

Italy U21

- UEFA European Under-21 Championship runner-up: 2013

Italy

- UEFA European Championship: 2020

Individual

- Pallone d'Argento: 2015–16
- Serie A Fair Play Moment of the Season: 2023–24

=== Orders ===
- 5th Class / Knight: Cavaliere Ordine al Merito della Repubblica Italiana: 2021
