= 2013 UEFA European Under-21 Championship final =

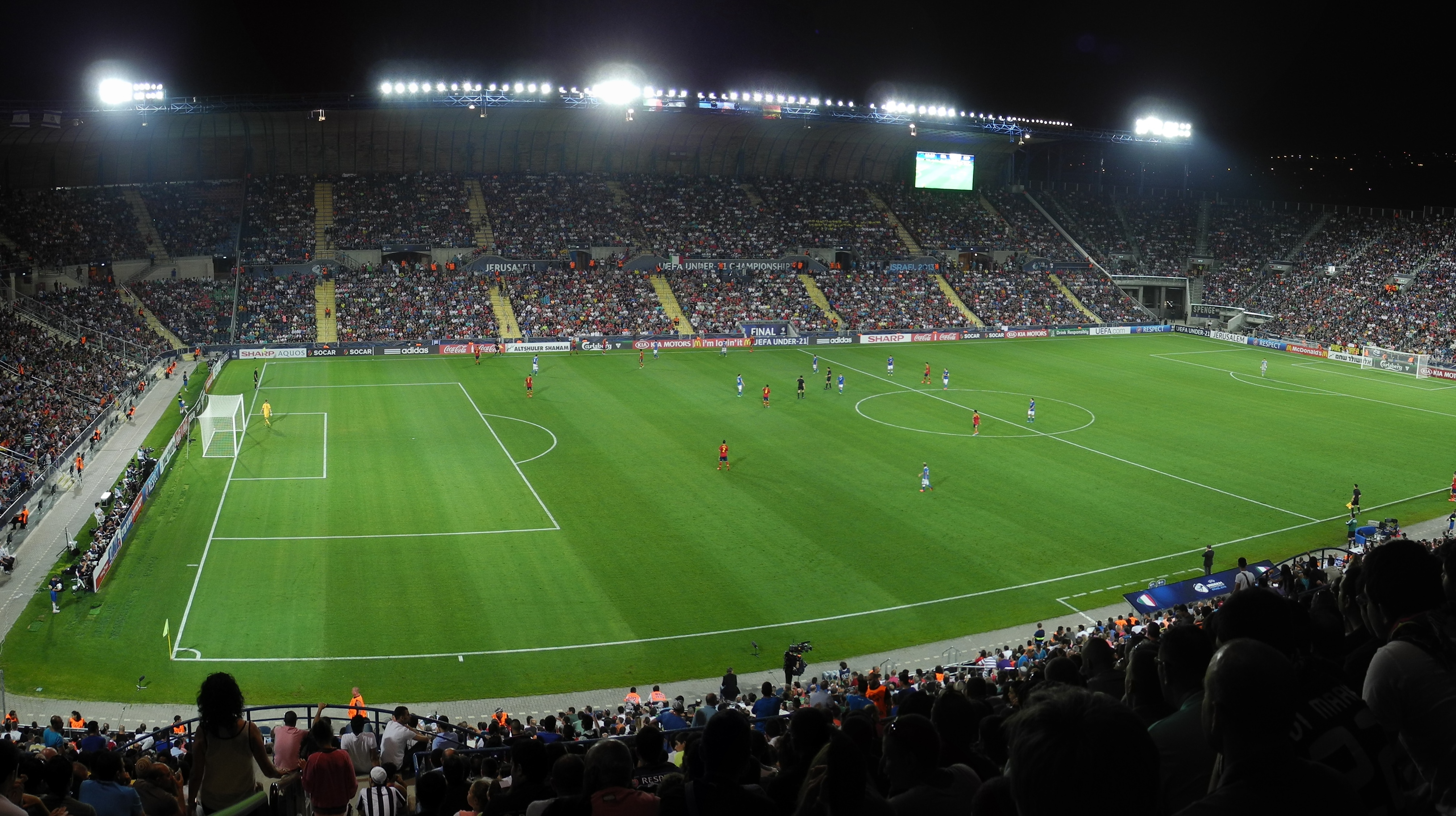
- The Teddy Stadium in Jerusalem held the final
- Event: 2013 UEFA European Under-21 Championship
Spain	Italy
(Spain)	(Italy)
4	2
- Date: 18 June 2013
- Venue: Teddy Stadium, Jerusalem
- Man of the Match: Thiago (Spain)
- Referee: Matej Jug (Slovenia)
- Attendance: 29,300
- Weather: Sunny

The 2013 UEFA European Under-21 Championship final was a football match that took place on 18 June 2013 at the Teddy Stadium in Jerusalem, Israel, and determined the winner of the 2013 UEFA European Under-21 Championship that hosted in Israel. Spain won their fourth title defeating Italy 4–2. Thiago scored a first half hat-trick for Spain in the final.

== Route to the final ==
Spain
Round
Italy
Opponent
Result
Group stage
Opponent
Result
Russia
1–0
Match 1
England
1–0
Germany
1–0
Match 2
Israel
4–0
Netherlands
3–0
Match 3
Norway
1–1

Group B
Pos	Team	Pld	W	D	L	GF	GA	GD	Pts	Group stage result
1	Spain	3	3	0	0	5	0	+5	9	Advance to knockout stage
2	Netherlands	3	2	0	1	8	6	+2	6	Advance to knockout stage
3	Germany	3	1	0	2	4	5	−1	3	
4	Russia	3	0	0	3	2	8	−6	0	

Final standings

Group A
Pos	Team	Pld	W	D	L	GF	GA	GD	Pts	Group stage result
1	Italy	3	2	1	0	6	1	+5	7	Advance to knockout stage
2	Norway	3	1	2	0	6	4	+2	5	Advance to knockout stage
3	Israel (H)	3	1	1	1	3	6	−3	4	
4	England	3	0	0	3	1	5	−4	0	

(H) Hosts
Opponent
Result
Knockout stage
Opponent
Result
Norway
3–0
Semifinals
Netherlands
1–0

== Match details ==
18 June 2013
19:00

Italy	2–4	Spain
Immobile 10'; Borini 80'	Report	Thiago 6', 31', 38' (pen.); Isco 66' (pen.)

Teddy Stadium, Jerusalem, Israel
Attendance: 29,300
Referee: Matej Jug (Slovenia)

Italy	Spain

GK	1	Francesco Bardi
RB	2	Giulio Donati
CB	13	Matteo Bianchetti
CB	6	Luca Caldirola (c)	(yellow card) 71'
LB	19	Vasco Regini	(yellow card) 65'
RM	7	Alessandro Florenzi		(substituted off) 58'
CM	21	Fausto Rossi
CM	4	Marco Verratti	(yellow card) 18'	(substituted off) 76'
LM	10	Lorenzo Insigne
FW	20	Fabio Borini
FW	9	Ciro Immobile		(substituted off) 58'
Substitutions:
FW	11	Manolo Gabbiadini		(substituted on) 58'
MF	18	Riccardo Saponara		(substituted on) 58'
MF	23	Marco Crimi		(substituted on) 76'
Manager:
Devis Mangia

GK	1	David de Gea
RB	2	Martín Montoya
CB	5	Marc Bartra
CB	6	Iñigo Martínez	(yellow card) 47'
LB	18	Alberto Moreno
DM	3	Asier Illarramendi
CM	10	Thiago (c)
CM	8	Koke	(yellow card) 12'	(substituted off) 86'
RW	11	Cristian Tello	(yellow card) 27'	(substituted off) 71'
LW	22	Isco
CF	12	Álvaro Morata		(substituted off) 80'
Substitutions:
FW	9	Rodrigo		(substituted on) 80'
MF	14	Ignacio Camacho		(substituted on) 86'
LW	19	Iker Muniain		(substituted on) 71'
Manager:
Julen Lopetegui

Assistant referees:
Roland Brandner (Austria)
Vencel Tóth (Hungary)
Fourth official:
Ivan Bebek (Croatia)

== See also ==
- 2013 UEFA European Under-21 Championship squads
