= Álvaro Morata =

Spanish footballer (born 1992)

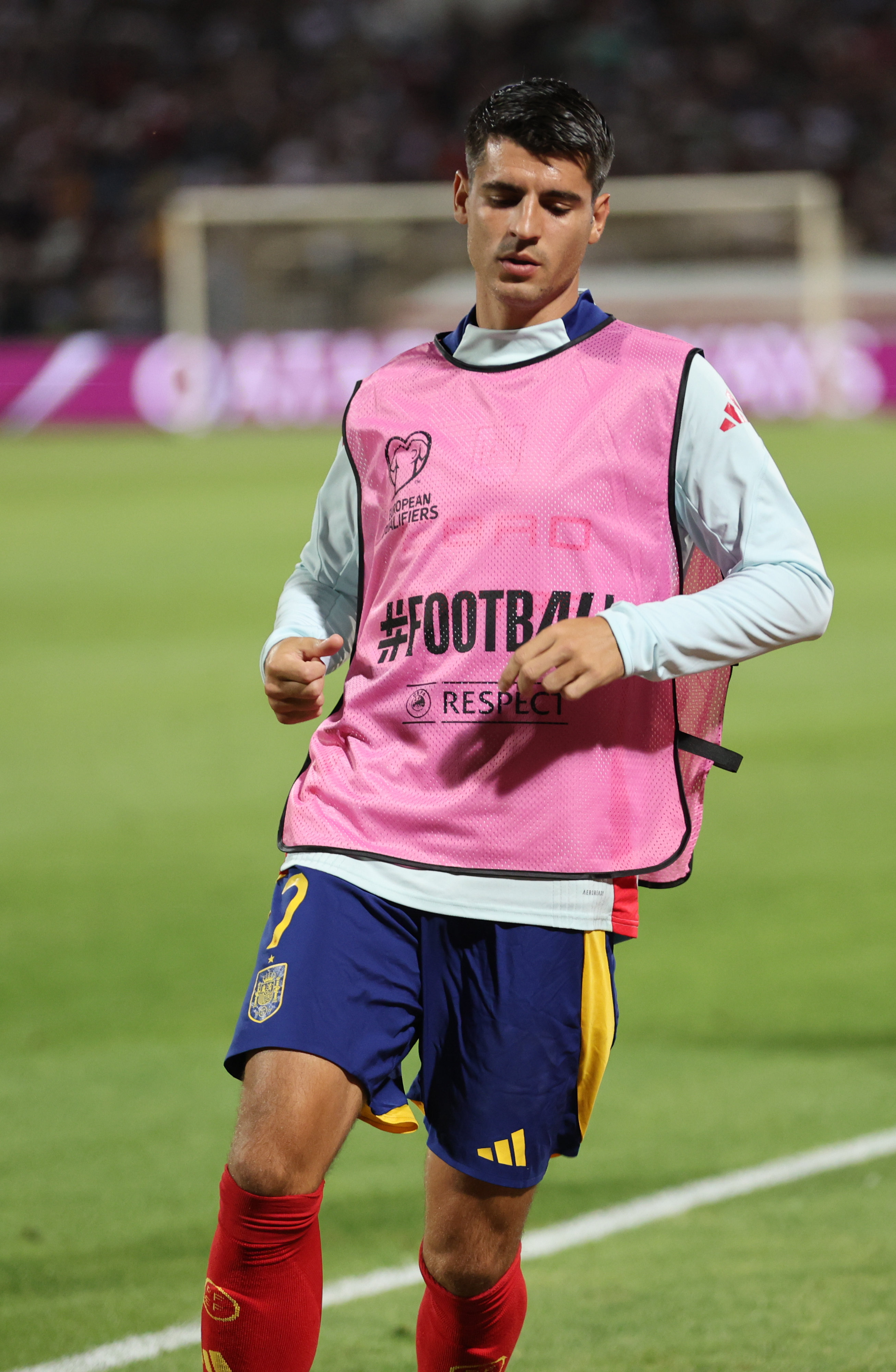
- Morata with Spain in 2025

Personal information
- Full name: Álvaro Borja Morata Martín
- Date of birth: 23 October 1992 (age 34)
- Place of birth: Madrid, Spain
- Height: 1.90 m (6 ft 3 in)
- Position: Striker

Team information
- Current team: Leganés (on loan from Como)
- Number: 21

Youth career
- 2005–2007: Atlético Madrid
- 2007–2008: Getafe
- 2008–2010: Real Madrid

Senior career*
Years	Team	Apps	(Gls)
2010–2013	Real Madrid B	83	(45)
2010–2014	Real Madrid	37	(10)
2014–2016	Juventus	64	(15)
2016–2017	Real Madrid	26	(15)
2017–2020	Chelsea	47	(16)
2019–2020	→ Atlético Madrid (loan)	49	(18)
2020–2024	Atlético Madrid	68	(28)
2020–2022	→ Juventus (loan)	67	(20)
2024–2026	AC Milan	16	(5)
2025	→ Galatasaray (loan)	12	(6)
2025–2026	→ Como (loan)	26	(0)
2026–	Como	0	(0)
2026–	→ Leganés (loan)	11	(4)

International career^{‡}
2009	Spain U17	6	(2)
2010	Spain U18	2	(3)
2010–2012	Spain U19	13	(11)
2013–2014	Spain U21	13	(13)
2014–2025	Spain	87	(37)
Medal record
Men's football
Representing Spain
UEFA European Championship
Winner	2024 Germany	Team
Bronze medal – third place	2020 Europe	Team
UEFA Nations League
Winner	2023 Netherlands	Team
Runner-up	2025 Germany	Team
UEFA European Under-21 Championship
Winner	2013 Israel	Team
UEFA European Under-19 Championship
Winner	2011 Romania	Team
FIFA U-17 World Cup
Third place	2009 Nigeria	Team
- * Club domestic league appearances and goals as of 11:19, 20 November 2026 (UTC) ‡ National team caps and goals as of 23:49, 16 October 2025 (UTC)

Álvaro Borja Morata Martín (born 23 October 1992) is a Spanish professional footballer who plays as a striker for Segunda División club Leganés, on loan from Serie A club Como.

Morata began his career at La Liga club Real Madrid, making his debut with the senior team in late 2010. After winning the 2013–14 UEFA Champions League, he moved to Serie A club Juventus for €20 million in 2014, winning the double of the domestic league and the Coppa Italia in both of his seasons with the club. After being bought back by Real Madrid for €30 million, he won a La Liga title and the UEFA Champions League in 2016–17, before joining Premier League club Chelsea in 2017 for a club record fee of around £60 million. In January 2019, Morata returned to Spain to join Atlético Madrid on loan, and joined the club permanently on 1 July 2020. From 2020 to 2022, Morata had another spell at Juventus on loan, winning the Supercoppa Italiana before continuing at Atlético Madrid. In 2024, Morata joined Serie A club AC Milan for a fee of €13 million. Subsequently in 2025, he joined Süper Lig club Galatasaray on loan, winning a domestic double.

Morata earned 34 caps for Spain at youth level, helping his country win the 2013 UEFA European Under-21 Championship. He made his senior debut for the Spain national team in 2014, and has represented his country at UEFA Euro 2016, UEFA Euro 2020, the 2022 FIFA World Cup and captained his team to victory at UEFA Euro 2024. With 37 goals, he is Spain's fourth top goalscorer of all time.

== Club career ==
=== Real Madrid ===
Morata signed for Real Madrid in 2008 from neighbouring Getafe after starting out at Atlético Madrid, and appeared for Real Madrid C while still a junior. In July 2010, after a successful season with the Juvenil A team, where he won two youth titles and scored 34 goals, he was promoted to Real Madrid Castilla, Real's reserve team. Later that month, first-team manager José Mourinho took Morata and four of his teammates on a preseason tour in the United States.

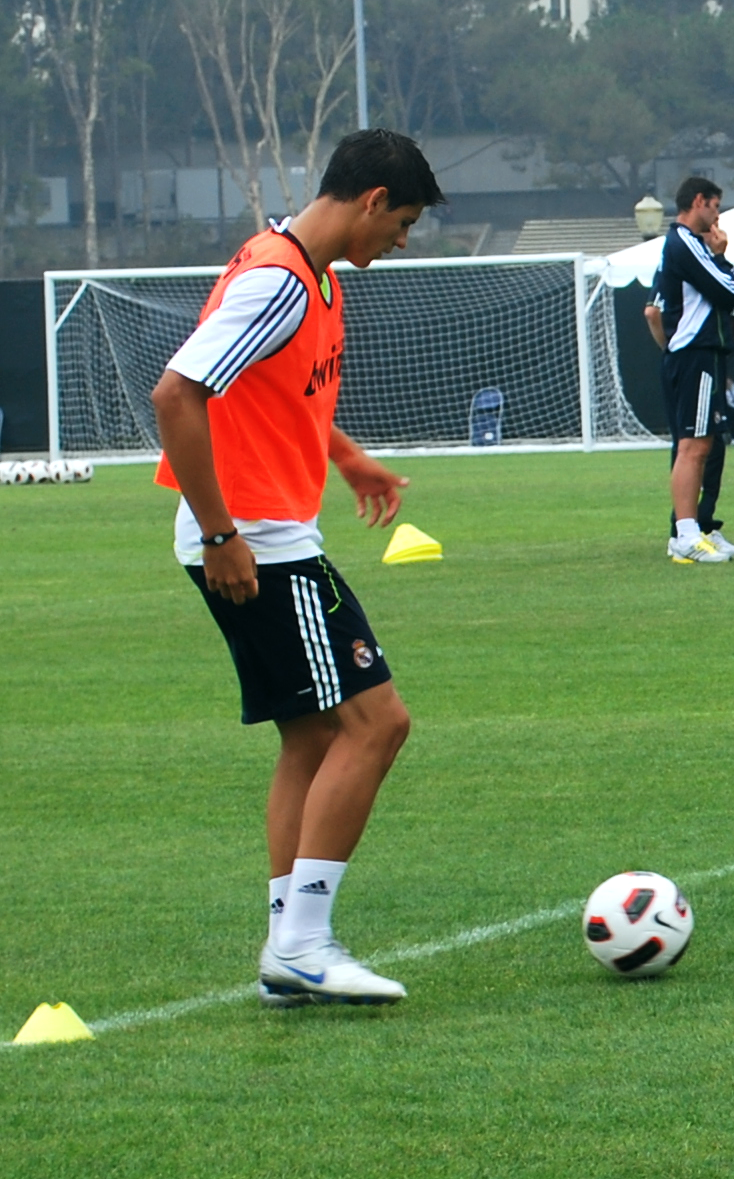
Morata training with Real Madrid in 2010

On 15 August 2010, Morata made his debut with Castilla in a friendly match with Alcorcón, scoring the only goal of the game. His Segunda División B debut came on 29 August in a 3–2 win against Coruxo, and he scored his first competitive goal in a 1–1 draw against Alcalá on 31 October.

On 12 December 2010, Morata made his debut for the first team when he was brought on as a substitute for Ángel Di María in the 88th minute of a 3–1 La Liga win at Real Zaragoza. Ten days later he made his first appearance in the Copa del Rey, again coming off the bench in the last few minutes. In January 2011, after Gonzalo Higuaín's injury, the Spanish media expected Morata to be his replacement in the main squad. Mourinho, however, rejected this, saying that "Morata is not yet ready to be a starter at Madrid. He trains with us, but he has to continue learning with Castilla". In this period Morata scored five goals in four matches with the reserves, while Emmanuel Adebayor was signed to replace Higuaín in the first team.

On 13 February 2011, Morata scored the first hat-trick of his career, in a 7–1 victory against Deportivo Fabril. He finished his first season as a senior with 14 league goals – joint top scorer in the squad with Joselu – but Castilla failed to gain promotion in the play-offs.

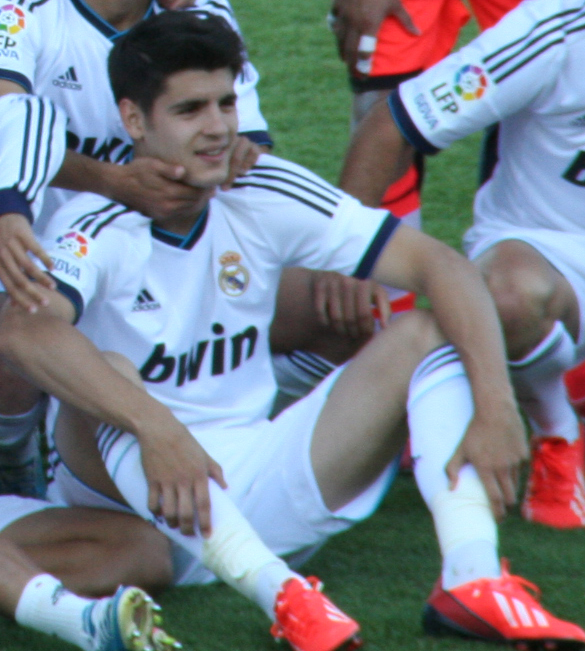
Morata celebrates winning the 2013 Puskás Cup with Real Madrid Castilla

Morata scored his first competitive goal with Real's first team on 11 November 2012, coming on in the 83rd minute and scoring the winner after just 60 seconds in a 2–1 away win against Levante. In his first official start, at home against Rayo Vallecano on 17 February of the following year, he scored the opener after just three minutes, but was substituted before the half-hour mark to make room for Raúl Albiol, after Sergio Ramos was sent off in a 2–0 home victory.

On 2 March 2013, Morata played the full 90 minutes of El Clásico against Barcelona, assisting Karim Benzema to score the opener in an eventual 2–1 home win. In the following season, he became a regular member of the first-team squad under new coach Carlo Ancelotti, but expressed a desire for more minutes during the January transfer window.

On 18 March 2014, Morata scored his first goal in the UEFA Champions League, the third goal in a 3–1 win over Schalke 04 at the Santiago Bernabéu in the round of 16. On 17 May, in the last game of the league campaign, he scored two late goals against Espanyol to help Real to a 3–1 home win, and finish with eight goals in the competition. He also featured in the club's victory in the UEFA Champions League Final against Atlético Madrid, playing the last ten minutes of regular time and extra time after replacing Benzema.

=== Juventus ===
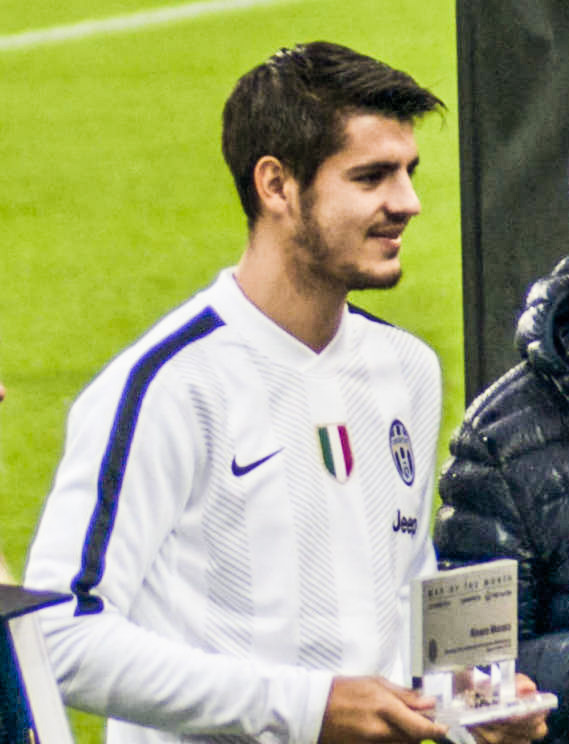
Morata with Juventus in 2014

On 19 July 2014, Juventus announced that they had reached an agreement for the fee of €20 million for the transfer of Morata, who signed a five-year deal, with Real Madrid having the option to buy him back in the future. He made his debut in Serie A on 13 September, replacing Fernando Llorente for the final minute of a 2–0 home win against Udinese; two weeks later he again came on in place of his compatriot, and headed his first goal for his new club as they won 3–0 at Atalanta.

On 5 October 2014, in a 3–2 home win against Roma, Morata came on as a substitute and was sent off for a foul on Kostas Manolas, who was ordered off for retaliating. On 9 November, he scored twice in a 7–0 home demolition of Parma, with Llorente – whom he replaced after 71 minutes – adding a further two. Morata came on for the final ten minutes of the Supercoppa Italiana against Napoli in Doha, Qatar on 22 December, and scored in the penalty shoot-out which Juventus lost 5–6.

On 28 January 2015, Morata played the last 13 minutes of the Coppa Italia fixture against Parma, and scored the game's only goal at the Stadio Ennio Tardini to qualify for the semi-finals. The following month, at home against Borussia Dortmund in the UEFA Champions League round of 16, he scored the winner in the 43rd minute of the first leg; he also started and found the net in the return match, helping Juve to a 3–0 win at the Westfalenstadion.

On 7 April 2015, Morata was sent off for a foul on Alessandro Diamanti as Juventus defeated Fiorentina in the cup semi-final, thus missing the final. One week later, he won a penalty in the first leg of the Champions League quarter-final against Monaco, which was converted by Arturo Vidal in a 1–0 home win. In the first leg of the semi-final, against Real Madrid, he put the hosts ahead with a tap-in in the eighth minute, as the match ended in a 2–1 home victory, and he repeated the feat in the return match, on both occasions not celebrating scoring against his former club. On 6 June, in the final against Barcelona in Berlin, he scored the equaliser early in the second half of a 1–3 loss.

In early August 2015, Morata was ruled out for a month due to a soleus muscle tear in his left calf during training, and was sidelined for the 2015 Supercoppa Italiana. In his second appearance after returning to action, on 15 September, he featured for 85 minutes and scored the winner in a 2–1 win at Manchester City in the UEFA Champions League group phase. On 30 September, he scored to help defeat Sevilla 2–0 at the Juventus Stadium, his fifth goal in as many appearances in the competition to equal Alessandro Del Piero's record. On 24 November, he was nominated for the UEFA Team of the Year.

On 10 December 2015, Morata signed a contract extension until 2020. On 20 March 2016, in the Derby della Mole away to neighbours Torino, he came off the bench in the first half and scored twice in a 4–1 victory. On 21 May, he again came off the bench to score the winning goal in the 20th minute of extra time to win the Coppa Italia final 1–0 against AC Milan in Rome's Stadio Olimpico.

=== Return to Real Madrid ===
On 21 June 2016, Real Madrid exercised their buy-back clause to re-sign Morata from Juventus for €30 million. His first competitive appearance was on 9 August, as he started in a 3–2 win over fellow Spaniards Sevilla in the 2016 UEFA Super Cup, being replaced by Benzema after 62 minutes. His first goal came in a 2–1 home win over Celta on 27 August.

On 5 April 2017, Morata profited from manager Zinedine Zidane's rotations and scored three times in a 4–2 away win against Leganés to keep his team two points clear of Barcelona with a game in hand. In spite of spending the vast majority of the season as backup to Benzema, he scored 15 league goals as the club was crowned champions for the first time in five years. He added three goals in nine appearances in the UEFA Champions League, which Real Madrid won for the second successive year.

=== Chelsea ===
==== 2017–18 season ====
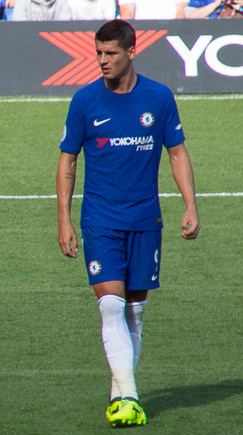
Morata playing for Chelsea in 2017

On 19 July 2017, Chelsea announced that they had agreed terms with Real Madrid for the transfer of Morata, for a reported club-record fee of around £60 million. On 21 July, he passed his medical and officially became a Chelsea player.

Morata made his competitive debut in the 2017 FA Community Shield match against Arsenal, coming on as a substitute in the 74th minute as his team lost on penalties after drawing 1–1 in normal time, with Morata missing in the shoot-out. On 12 August 2017, he scored and provided an assist for David Luiz in his first appearance in the Premier League, a 2–3 defeat at home to Burnley – his goal was a header in the 69th minute of the game to cut the deficit to 3–1. On 23 September, he scored his first hat-trick for Chelsea in a 4–0 away win against Stoke City; this made him the 17th Chelsea player to score a hat-trick in the Premier League.

On 5 November 2017, Morata scored in the 1–0 home win against Manchester United, coached by his former boss Mourinho. He took his league tally to ten goals on 26 December, helping Chelsea to a 2–0 win over Brighton & Hove Albion, also at Stamford Bridge.

On 17 January 2018, Morata was sent off after picking up a booking for diving, then another seconds later for dissent, in a third round FA Cup replay win over Norwich City. He finished his first year with 15 goals in all competitions, and the Blues finished fifth in the league table.

==== 2018–19 season ====
Morata opened his account for the following campaign on 18 August 2018, scoring the second goal in a 3–2 home victory against Arsenal. On 4 October, he scored the winner in a 1–0 win over MOL Vidi in the group stage of the UEFA Europa League. A month later, he scored twice to help beat Crystal Palace 3–1 in a league fixture at home.

=== Atlético Madrid ===
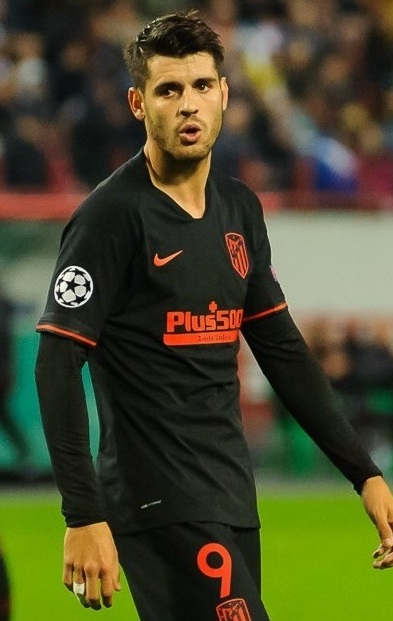
Morata playing for Atlético Madrid in 2019

On 27 January 2019, Morata was transferred to Atlético Madrid on an 18-month loan deal. He made his league debut on 3 February, in a 0–1 away loss against Real Betis. He scored his first goal on 24 February, in a 2–0 home win over Villarreal. On 6 July 2019, Atlético Madrid confirmed the permanent signing of Morata from Chelsea and he would officially join the club on 1 July 2020, for a fee around £58 million.

On 18 August 2019, Morata scored the only goal in Atlético Madrid's La Liga opener win against Getafe. On 1 October 2019, Morata marked his 300th professional game with an assist for the game's opening goal in a 2–0 away win against Russian side Lokomotiv Moscow. On 22 October, he scored his first Champions League goal for Atlético by heading home Renan Lodi's cross for the only goal of the game in a home win against German side Bayer Leverkusen. This also made him the first player to score for both Real Madrid and Atlético in the Champions League.

On 11 March 2020, in the Champions League last 16 second leg away to defending champions Liverpool, Morata came on as a late substitute in extra time and scored the final goal of the game in a 3–2 away win, thus winning the tie 4–2 on aggregate, ensuring his team's qualification to the quarter-finals of the competition.

=== Return to Juventus ===
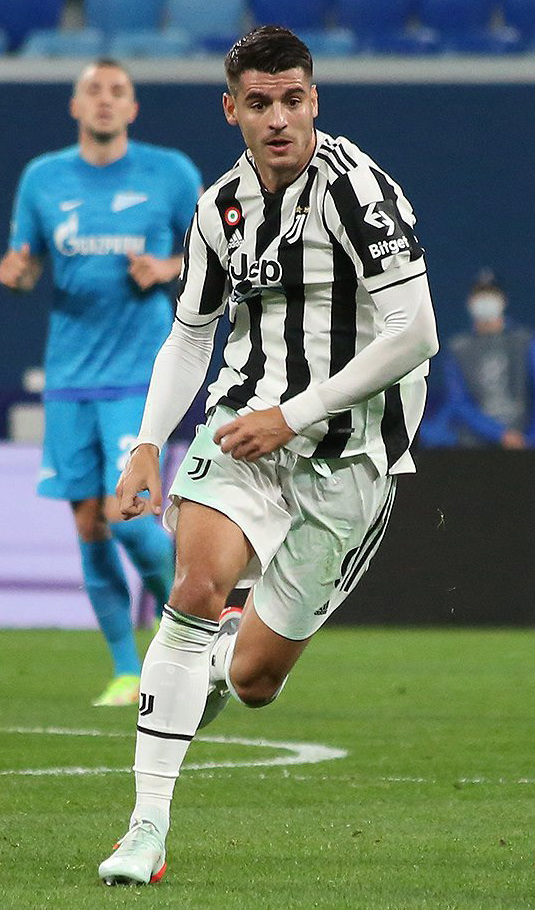
Morata playing for Juventus in 2021

Morata returned to Juventus on 22 September 2020, on a one-year loan worth €10 million, with an option for purchase at €45 million. Juventus also reserved the right to extend the loan for a further year for another €10 million; in this case, the option for purchase was worth €35 million.

He made his first appearance for the club since his return on 27 September, in a 2–2 away draw against Roma in Serie A. He scored his first goal for the club since his return on 17 October, in a 1–1 away draw to Crotone. Morata scored a brace on 20 October, to help Juventus win 2–0 in the UEFA Champions League group stage match against Dynamo Kyiv away from home. On 28 October, he had three goals disallowed for offside against Barcelona in a Champions League group stage game, which Juventus lost 2–0 at home. On 20 January 2021, Morata won the Supercoppa Italiana, beating 2–0 Napoli in a match where he scored the second goal.

On 15 June 2021, Morata's loan with Juventus was extended until 30 June 2022. In the 2021–22 season, he scored nine goals in 35 Serie A appearances, as Juventus decided not to activate the buy option of €35m.

=== Return to Atlético Madrid ===
In July 2022, Atlético Madrid confirmed that Morata would return to Madrid at the end of his loan spell at Juventus. In the 2022–23 Champions League season, Atlético were eliminated from all European competitions as they finished last in the group, in which Morata failed to score in his five matches in the competition. However, he scored 13 goals in the league, his highest total goals at Atlético in La Liga.

On 28 August 2023, he scored a brace in a 7–0 win over Rayo Vallecano, contributing to Atlético's biggest away win in La Liga history. On 24 September 2023, he scored a brace in a 3–1 victory over Real Madrid, his first La Liga goals against his former club. On 3 January 2024, Morata scored his first hat-trick with the club against Girona in a 4–3 loss. In the 2023–24 season, he set a new personal best in La Liga by scoring 15 goals, making him the second top scorer for his club behind Antoine Griezmann.

=== AC Milan ===
On 19 July 2024, Morata joined Serie A club AC Milan on a four-year contract with the option for a further season if he registers at least 20 goal contributions in the 2024–25 season. Before settling on a number 7 shirt, the same number he usually plays with in the national team, he considered choosing number 22 and even asked for permission from Kaká, although the number had been in use since his transfer to Real Madrid in 2009. He made his debut for Milan on 17 August, coming on as a substitute and scoring in a 2–2 draw against Torino. Later that year, on 5 November, he scored his first Champions League goal with Milan in a 3–1 away victory over his former club Real Madrid.

==== Loan to Galatasaray ====
On 2 February 2025, Morata joined Süper Lig club Galatasaray on a loan deal from AC Milan, with an option to buy set at €10 million. The transfer was prompted by a significant injury to Galatasaray's primary striker, Mauro Icardi. Morata made his Süper Lig debut for Galatasaray on 3 February 2025, coming on as a substitute in the 69th minute during a 1–0 away victory against Gaziantep. He scored his first goal for the club on 6 February in a Turkish Cup match against Boluspor, netting in the 21st minute to level the score, contributing to a 4–1 win. Throughout his initial months with Galatasaray, Morata's performances were mixed.

He faced challenges in consistently filling the void left by Icardi, managing to score three goals in ten appearances over his first three months. His playing time was also affected by a muscle injury in February, which sidelined him for several matches. Despite these setbacks, Morata delivered a standout performance on 27 April, in a league match against Eyüpspor. Entering the game in the 67th minute, he assisted Victor Osimhen for Galatasaray's third goal and subsequently scored two goals himself in the 87th and 89th minutes, contributing to a 5–1 victory. On 11 August, AC Milan terminated the loan agreement by paying a fee of €5 million to Galatasaray.

==== Loan to Como ====
On 12 August 2025, Morata joined Serie A club Como on a season-long loan, with a conditional obligation to make the move permanent at the end of the 2025–26 season. He was sent off in a 2–1 defeat to Fiorentina on 14 February 2026 after receiving two yellow cards in two minutes. Manager Cesc Fabregas said afterwards: "Provocation is part of football. Those who don't tolerate provocation have to change careers." Though Como finished the season in fourth place, thus qualifying for UEFA competitions for the first time in their history, Morata scored just once all season, netting the final goal in a 3–1 win over Fiorentina in the quarter-final of the Coppa Italia.

=== Como ===
On 16 June 2026, Como activated Morata's buy option and signed him permanently ahead of the 2026–27 season.

==== Loan to Leganés ====
On 28 August 2026, Morata returned to Spain, signing for second-tier club Leganés on a season-long deal.

Álvaro Morata's first appereance with C. D. Leganés on 4th September 2026, Estadio de Gran Canaria, against U. D. Las Palmas (0:0)

== International career ==
=== Youth ===
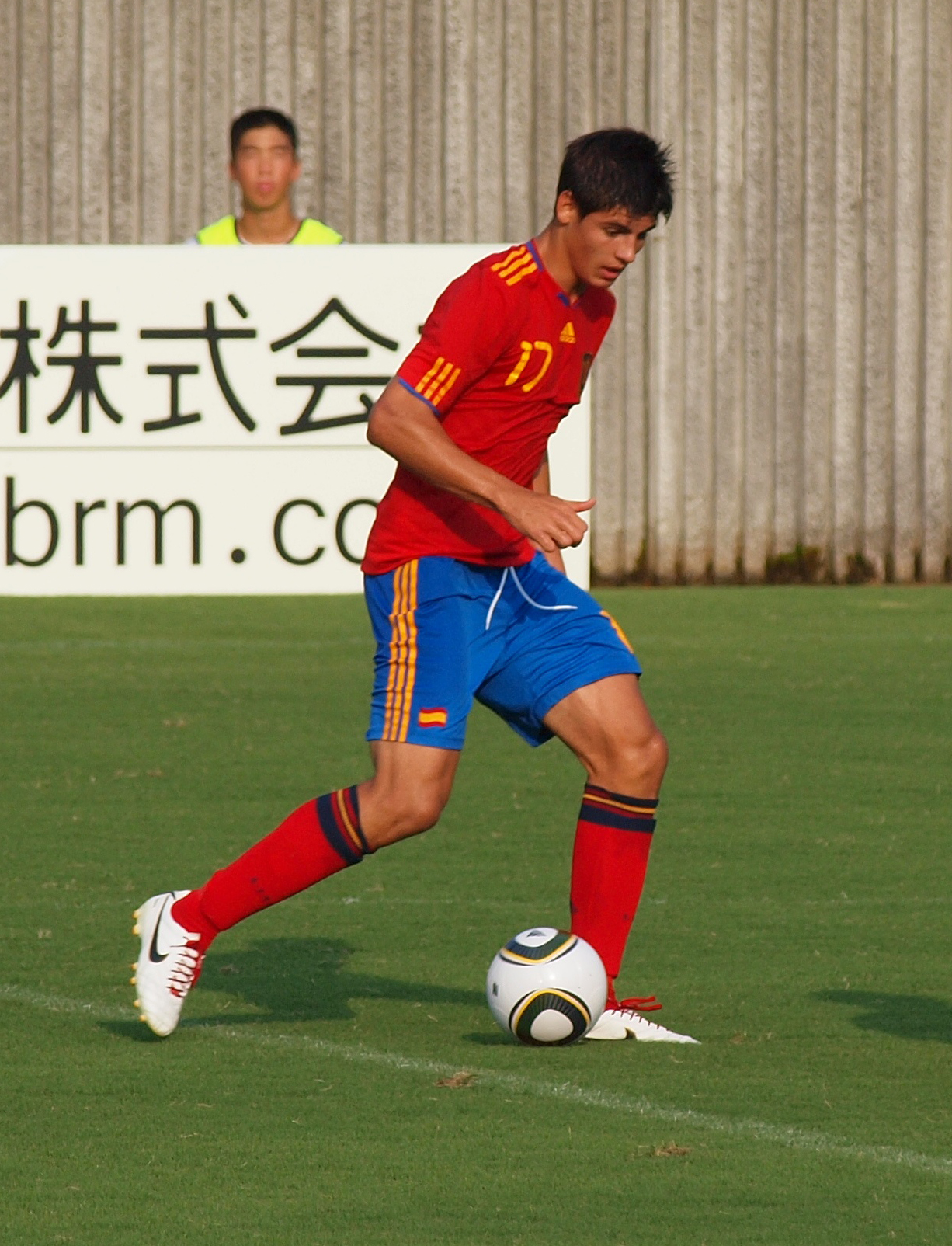
Morata playing for Spain U19 in 2010

Morata was selected to the Spain under-17 team for the 2009 U-17 World Cup in Nigeria, playing four matches and scoring two goals as Spain finished third. Subsequently, he represented the under-19s at the Japan International Tournament, helping Spain finish second behind the hosts.

Morata was selected by Spain for the 2011 UEFA European Under-19 Championship in Romania, helping the national team win the tournament with six goals, the highest in the competition. He made his debut with the under-21s at the 2013 UEFA European Under-21 Championship in Israel, scoring the only goal in each of the first two group games against Russia and Germany, in the 82nd and 86th minutes respectively. He closed out a perfect group stage with his third goal, against the Netherlands in a 3–0 win.

In the semi-final against Norway, after appearing as 58th minute substitute for Rodrigo Moreno, Morata scored his fourth goal in four matches and assisted a goal for Isco. He returned to the starting line-up for the final and assisted captain Thiago Alcântara's sixth minute opening goal in a 4–2 win over Italy. Morata's four goals in five matches won him the Golden Boot award for top goalscorer. He was also named in UEFA's Squad of the Tournament.

=== Senior ===
On 7 November 2014, Morata was called up to manager Vicente del Bosque's senior squad for matches against Belarus and Germany. He made his debut against Belarus on the 15 November, replacing Isco for the last ten minutes of a 3–0 win in Huelva for the UEFA Euro 2016 qualifiers. In the same competition, on 27 March 2015, he scored his first senior international goal, the only goal in a victory over Ukraine in Seville.

Selected for the finals in France, Morata started and scored a brace in a 3–0 group win against Turkey in Nice. On 2 September 2017, coming off the bench in the 77th minute, he scored once to help the hosts defeat Italy 3–0 in the 2018 FIFA World Cup qualifiers. He was left out of Spain's 23-man squad for the World Cup finals in Russia, following what was described by The Guardian as "an indifferent season at Chelsea."

On 24 May 2021, he was included in Luis Enrique's 24-man squad for UEFA Euro 2020. On 19 June, In Spain's second group match of the tournament against Poland, Morata scored the opening goal in an eventual 1–1 draw. Morata scored Spain's fourth goal of the Euro 2020 round of 16 in the 100th minute of the game against Croatia, resulting in a 5–3 victory on 28 June. In the semi-finals against Italy, he came off the bench to score an equalising goal, which sent the match to extra-time and eventually to a penalty-shootout. Spain were eliminated after losing the shootout by 4–2, in which his penalty was saved by Gianluigi Donnarumma. His goal against Italy was his sixth in the European Championship, overtaking Fernando Torres' Spanish record of five goals in the competition.

On 27 September 2022, he scored a goal in the 88th minute to secure a 1–0 victory over Portugal, which helped Spain to clinch top spot of their group in the Nations League A, and qualify to the competition's finals. In November 2022, he was named in the final squad for the 2022 FIFA World Cup in Qatar. During the group stage, he scored a goal each in all three matches against Costa Rica, Germany and Japan, equaling the same record for Spain by Telmo Zarra in 1950.

In March 2023, Morata was named as captain of the Spain national team by head coach Luis de la Fuente for the upcoming Euro 2024 qualifying matches. In June 2023, he was selected in the final squad for the Nations League Finals, which Spain won for the first time after defeating Croatia 5–4 on penalties following a goalless draw. On 8 September, he scored his first international hat-trick in a 7–1 win away to Georgia in UEFA Euro 2024 qualification.

Morata was confirmed as Spain's captain for UEFA Euro 2024. He scored the opening goal in a 3–0 win over Croatia in Spain's first game of the tournament. He recorded an assist on Lamine Yamal's goal as Spain came from behind to achieve a 2–1 win over France in the semi-final. With Spain's 2–1 victory against England in the final, Morata joined 12 other players in having won both youth and senior Euro titles, alongside his teammates Mikel Merino, Ferran Torres, Nacho and Rodri. Morata lifted Spain's tournament trophy as captain.

After an unimpressive season at Como, and having not been called up since September 2025, Morata was not included in Spain's squad for the 2026 FIFA World Cup.

== Style of play ==
A striker, in his younger days, Morata was compared to Real Madrid and Spain's Fernando Morientes due to his playing style. During his first season at Juventus he stood out for his pace, energy, physicality and work-rate on the pitch, while his technique, opportunism, heading ability and positional sense saw him score several crucial goals. Despite this, Morata has been criticised for his inconsistency in front of goal and perceived poor mentality, most notably during his time at Chelsea. He has also been praised for his leadership.

== Personal life ==
Morata was born in Madrid to Susana Martín and Alfonso Morata. His father is heavily involved in transfer negotiations alongside Morata's agent, Juanma López.

In March 2014, Morata shaved off all of his hair in solidarity with sick children, saying "kids with cancer wanted to have my haircut but they couldn't, so I gave myself theirs."

Morata married his Italian girlfriend Alice Campello in Venice on 17 June 2017. They have four children: three sons, including twins Alessandro and Leonardo (born 2018), Edoardo (born 2020), and a daughter, Bella (born 2023). In 2018, Morata changed his shirt number at Chelsea from 9 to 29 in honour of the 29 July birthday of his twin sons. Morata announced the couple's separation on August 12, 2024 through an Instagram story. The couple reconciled in January 2025.

During Spain's celebrations of their Euro 2024 victory over England, Morata and teammate Rodri were filmed chanting "Gibraltar is Spanish". The chants were labelled "rancid", "discriminatory" and "hugely offensive to Gibraltarians" by the Government of Gibraltar, and led to an official complaint to UEFA by the Gibraltar Government and Gibraltar Football Association. After an investigation was opened on 19 July, Morata and Rodri were formally charged under Article 11 of UEFA on 23 July. The pair were given a one match ban.

== Career statistics ==
=== Club ===
As of match played 20 November 2026

Appearances and goals by club, season and competition
Club	Season	League			National cup (Note: Includes Copa del Rey, Coppa Italia, FA Cup, Turkish Cup)		League cup (Note: Includes EFL Cup)		Europe		Other		Total	
Club	Season	Division	Apps	Goals	Apps	Goals	Apps	Goals	Apps	Goals	Apps	Goals	Apps	Goals
Real Madrid Castilla	2010–11	Segunda División B	26	14	—		—		—		2 (Note: Appearance(s) in Segunda División B play-offs)	1	28	15
Real Madrid Castilla	2011–12	Segunda División B	33	15	—		—		—		4	3	37	18
Real Madrid Castilla	2012–13	Segunda División	18	12	—		—		—		—		18	12
Real Madrid Castilla	Total		77	41	—		—		—		6	4	83	45
Real Madrid	2010–11	La Liga	1	0	1	0	—		0	0	—		2	0
Real Madrid	2011–12	La Liga	1	0	0	0	—		0	0	0	0	1	0
Real Madrid	2012–13	La Liga	12	2	2	0	—		1 (Note: Appearance(s) in UEFA Champions League)	0	0	0	15	2
Real Madrid	2013–14	La Liga	23	8	6	0	—		5	1	—		34	9
Real Madrid	Total		37	10	9	0	—		6	1	0	0	52	11
Juventus	2014–15	Serie A	29	8	4	2	—		12	5	1 (Note: Appearance(s) in Supercoppa Italiana)	0	46	15
Juventus	2015–16	Serie A	34	7	5	3	—		8	2	0	0	47	12
Juventus	Total		63	15	9	5	—		20	7	1	0	93	27
Real Madrid	2016–17	La Liga	26	15	5	2	—		9	3	3 (Note: One appearance in UEFA Super Cup, two appearances in FIFA Club World Cup)	0	43	20
Chelsea	2017–18	Premier League	31	11	6	2	3	1	7	1	1 (Note: Appearance in FA Community Shield)	0	48	15
Chelsea	2018–19	Premier League	16	5	1	2	2	0	4 (Note: Appearance(s) in UEFA Europa League)	2	1	0	24	9
Chelsea	Total		47	16	7	4	5	1	11	3	2	0	72	24
Atlético Madrid (loan)	2018–19	La Liga	15	6	0	0	—		2	0	—		17	6
Atlético Madrid (loan)	2019–20	La Liga	34	12	0	0	—		8	3	2 (Note: Appearance(s) in Supercopa de España)	1	44	16
Atlético Madrid (loan)	Total		49	18	0	0	—		10	3	2	1	61	22
Juventus (loan)	2020–21	Serie A	32	11	3	2	—		8	6	1	1	44	20
Juventus (loan)	2021–22	Serie A	35	9	5	1	—		7	2	1	0	48	12
Juventus (loan)	Total		67	20	8	3	—		15	8	2	1	92	32
Atlético Madrid	2022–23	La Liga	36	13	4	2	—		5	0	—		45	15
Atlético Madrid	2023–24	La Liga	32	15	5	1	—		10	5	1	0	48	21
Atlético Madrid	Total		68	28	9	3	—		15	5	1	0	93	36
AC Milan	2024–25	Serie A	16	5	—		—		7	1	2	0	25	6
Galatasaray (loan)	2024–25	Süper Lig	12	6	3	1	—		1	0	—		16	7
Como (loan)	2025–26	Serie A	26	0	4	1	—		—		—		30	1
Leganés (loan)	2026–27	Segunda División	11	4	1	0	—		—		—		12	4
Career total			499	177	55	19	5	1	94	31	19	6	672	235

=== International ===
As of match played 7 September 2025

Appearances and goals by national team and year
National team	Year	Apps	Goals
Spain	2014	2	0
Spain	2015	4	1
Spain	2016	12	7
Spain	2017	5	5
Spain	2018	4	0
Spain	2019	6	4
Spain	2020	3	1
Spain	2021	14	5
Spain	2022	11	7
Spain	2023	8	4
Spain	2024	15	3
Spain	2025	3	0
Total		87	37

Spain score listed first, score column indicates score after each Morata goal.

List of international goals scored by Álvaro Morata
No.	Date	Venue	Cap	Opponent	Score	Result	Competition
1	27 March 2015	Ramón Sánchez Pizjuán, Seville, Spain	3	Ukraine	1–0	1–0	UEFA Euro 2016 qualifying
2	1 June 2016	Red Bull Arena, Salzburg, Austria	9	South Korea	4–0	6–1	Friendly
3	1 June 2016	Red Bull Arena, Salzburg, Austria	9	South Korea	6–1	6–1	Friendly
4	17 June 2016	Allianz Riviera, Nice, France	11	Turkey	1–0	3–0	UEFA Euro 2016
5	17 June 2016	Allianz Riviera, Nice, France	11	Turkey	3–0	3–0	UEFA Euro 2016
6	21 June 2016	Nouveau Stade, Bordeaux, France	12	Croatia	1–0	1–2	UEFA Euro 2016
7	5 September 2016	Reino de León, León, Spain	15	Liechtenstein	6–0	8–0	2018 FIFA World Cup qualification
8	5 September 2016	Reino de León, León, Spain	15	Liechtenstein	7–0	8–0	2018 FIFA World Cup qualification
9	7 June 2017	Nueva Condomina, Murcia, Spain	20	Colombia	2–2	2–2	Friendly
10	2 September 2017	Santiago Bernabéu, Madrid, Spain	21	Italy	3–0	3–0	2018 FIFA World Cup qualification
11	5 September 2017	Rheinpark Stadion, Vaduz, Liechtenstein	22	Liechtenstein	2–0	8–0	2018 FIFA World Cup qualification
12	5 September 2017	Rheinpark Stadion, Vaduz, Liechtenstein	22	Liechtenstein	6–0	8–0	2018 FIFA World Cup qualification
13	11 November 2017	La Rosaleda, Málaga, Spain	23	Costa Rica	2–0	5–0	Friendly
14	26 March 2019	National Stadium, Ta' Qali, Malta	29	Malta	1–0	2–0	UEFA Euro 2020 qualifying
15	26 March 2019	National Stadium, Ta' Qali, Malta	29	Malta	2–0	2–0	UEFA Euro 2020 qualifying
16	10 June 2019	Santiago Bernabéu, Madrid, Spain	31	Sweden	2–0	3–0	UEFA Euro 2020 qualifying
17	15 November 2019	Ramón de Carranza, Cádiz, Spain	32	Malta	1–0	7–0	UEFA Euro 2020 qualifying
18	17 November 2020	La Cartuja, Seville, Spain	36	Germany	1–0	6–0	2020–21 UEFA Nations League A
19	25 March 2021	Nuevo Los Cármenes, Granada, Spain	37	Greece	1–0	1–1	2022 FIFA World Cup qualification
20	19 June 2021	La Cartuja, Seville, Spain	42	Poland	1–0	1–1	UEFA Euro 2020
21	28 June 2021	Parken Stadium, Copenhagen, Denmark	44	Croatia	4–3	5–3 (a.e.t.)	UEFA Euro 2020
22	6 July 2021	Wembley Stadium, London, England	46	Italy	1–1	1–1 (a.e.t.); 2–4 (p)	UEFA Euro 2020
23	14 November 2021	La Cartuja, Seville, Spain	50	Sweden	1–0	1–0	2022 FIFA World Cup qualification
24	29 March 2022	Riazor, A Coruña, Spain	52	Iceland	1–0	5–0	Friendly
25	29 March 2022	Riazor, A Coruña, Spain	52	Iceland	2–0	5–0	Friendly
26	2 June 2022	Benito Villamarín, Seville, Spain	53	Portugal	1–0	1–1	2022–23 UEFA Nations League A
27	27 September 2022	Estádio Municipal, Braga, Portugal	57	Portugal	1–0	1–0	2022–23 UEFA Nations League A
28	23 November 2022	Al Thumama Stadium, Doha, Qatar	58	Costa Rica	7–0	7–0	2022 FIFA World Cup
29	27 November 2022	Al Bayt Stadium, Al Khor, Qatar	59	Germany	1–0	1–1	2022 FIFA World Cup
30	1 December 2022	Khalifa International Stadium, Al Rayyan, Qatar	60	Japan	1–0	1–2	2022 FIFA World Cup
31	8 September 2023	Boris Paichadze Dinamo Arena, Tbilisi, Georgia	65	Georgia	1–0	7–1	UEFA Euro 2024 qualifying
32	8 September 2023	Boris Paichadze Dinamo Arena, Tbilisi, Georgia	65	Georgia	4–0	7–1	UEFA Euro 2024 qualifying
33	8 September 2023	Boris Paichadze Dinamo Arena, Tbilisi, Georgia	65	Georgia	5–1	7–1	UEFA Euro 2024 qualifying
34	12 October 2023	La Cartuja, Seville, Spain	67	Scotland	1–0	2–0	UEFA Euro 2024 qualifying
35	8 June 2024	Estadi Mallorca Son Moix, Palma, Spain	73	Northern Ireland	2–1	5–1	Friendly
36	15 June 2024	Olympiastadion, Berlin, Germany	74	Croatia	1–0	3–0	UEFA Euro 2024
37	15 October 2024	Estadio Nuevo Arcángel, Córdoba, Spain	82	Serbia	2–0	3–0	2024–25 UEFA Nations League A

== Honours ==
Real Madrid Castilla

- Segunda División B: 2011–12

Real Madrid

- La Liga: 2011–12, 2016–17
- Copa del Rey: 2013–14
- UEFA Champions League: 2013–14, 2016–17
- UEFA Super Cup: 2016
- FIFA Club World Cup: 2016

Juventus

- Serie A: 2014–15, 2015–16
- Coppa Italia: 2014–15, 2015–16, 2020–21
- Supercoppa Italiana: 2020

Chelsea

- FA Cup: 2017–18
- UEFA Europa League: 2018–19

AC Milan

- Supercoppa Italiana: 2024–25

Galatasaray

- Süper Lig: 2024–25
- Turkish Cup: 2024–25

Spain U17

- FIFA U-17 World Cup third place: 2009

Spain U19

- UEFA European Under-19 Championship: 2011

Spain U21

- UEFA European Under-21 Championship: 2013

Spain

- UEFA European Championship: 2024
- UEFA Nations League: 2022–23; runner-up: 2024–25

Individual

- UEFA European Under-19 Championship Team of the Tournament: 2011
- UEFA European Under-19 Championship Golden Boot: 2011
- UEFA European Under-21 Championship Team of the Tournament: 2013
- UEFA European Under-21 Championship Golden Boot: 2013
- UEFA Champions League Squad of the Season: 2014–15
