= Alberto Moreno =

Spanish footballer (born 1992)

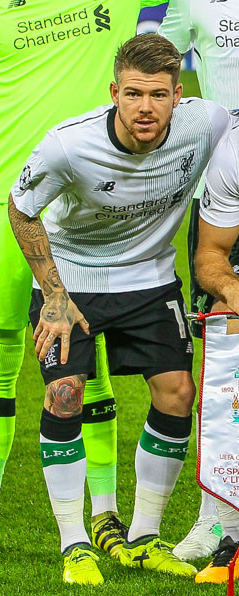
- Moreno lining up for Liverpool in 2017

Personal information
- Full name: Alberto Moreno Pérez
- Date of birth: 5 July 1992 (age 34)
- Place of birth: Seville, Spain
- Height: 1.71 m (5 ft 7 in)
- Position: Left-back

Team information
- Current team: Mallorca
- Number: 5

Youth career
- 2004–2011: Sevilla

Senior career*
Years	Team	Apps	(Gls)
2011–2013	Sevilla B	49	(7)
2012–2014	Sevilla	45	(3)
2014–2019	Liverpool	90	(3)
2019–2024	Villarreal	98	(5)
2024–2026	Como	43	(2)
2026–	Mallorca	5	(0)

International career
2013	Spain U21	10	(0)
2013–2017	Spain	5	(0)
Medal record
Men's football
Representing Spain
UEFA European Under-21 Championship
Gold medal – first place	2013 Israel
- * Club domestic league appearances and goals as of 22:15, 24 October 2026 (UTC)

Alberto Moreno Pérez (Spanish pronunciation: [alˈβeɾto moˈɾeno ˈpeɾeθ]; born 5 July 1992) is a Spanish professional footballer who plays as a left-back for Segunda División club Mallorca.

An academy graduate of local side Sevilla, he made his senior debut for the club's reserve side in 2011 before going on to feature in 62 official games for the first team. During his time with Sevilla, he was part of the squad which won the Europa League title in 2014. The following season, he joined Premier League club Liverpool for a reported fee of £12 million, where he made 141 appearances and collected runners-up medals in the EFL Cup and the Europa League, and a winner's medal in the Champions League.

Moreno was part of the Spain under-21 team that won the 2013 UEFA European Championship and made his senior debut the same year.

== Club career ==
=== Sevilla ===
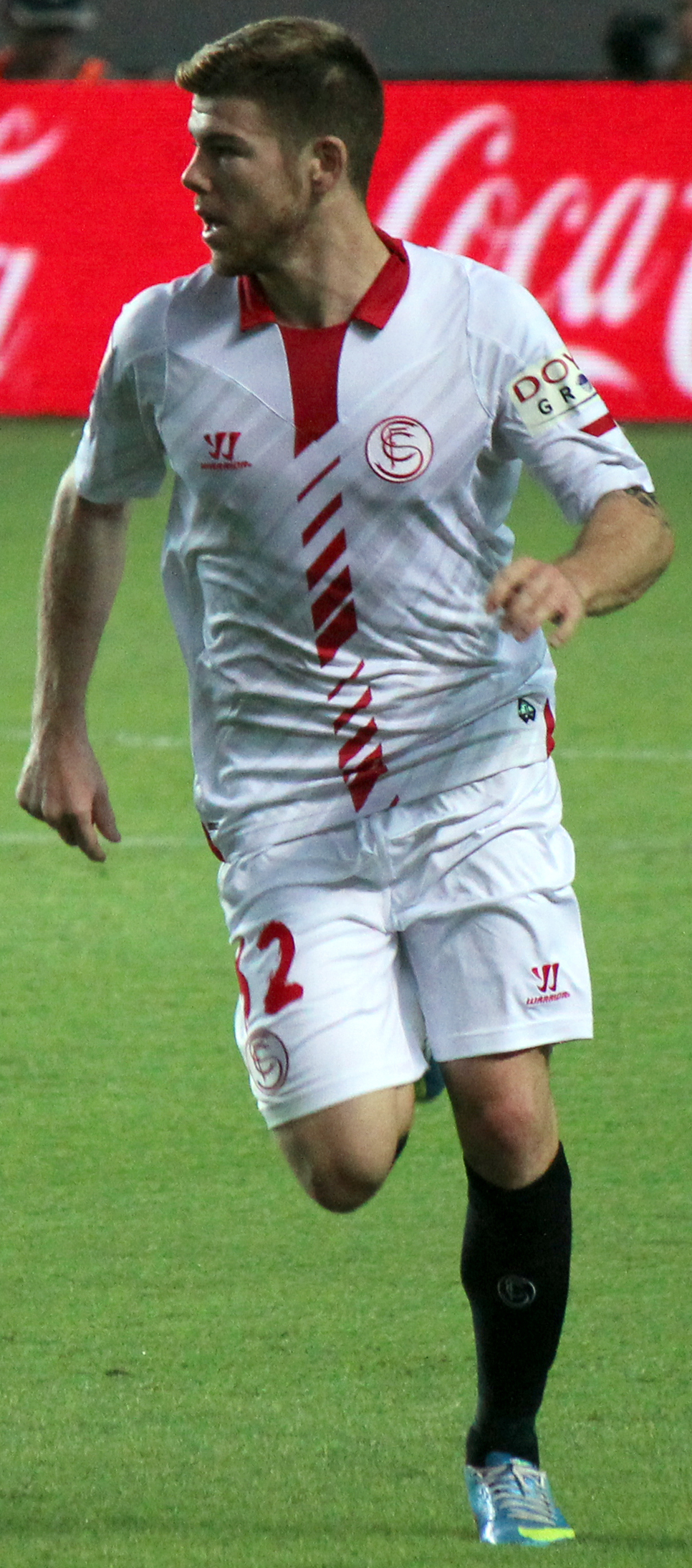
Moreno with Sevilla in 2013

Moreno was born in the Andalusian capital of Seville and at the age of 13 joined local side Sevilla. There he progressed through the club's youth academy and made his senior debut for the reserve side, Sevilla Atlético, on 12 June 2011 in a 3–1 home win over Guadalajara in the Segunda División B play-offs. The club ultimately lost 5–4 on aggregate, however. His first full season followed thereafter during which he scored four goals in 30 games, including his first senior goal directly from a corner-kick in added time against Cádiz. Whilst playing for the reserve side, Moreno operated under the tutelage of Ramón Tejada who rotated him between attacking and defensive positions down the left-flank of the field. The positional rotation was later credited for his tactical awareness which contributed to him making his first team, and La Liga debut. This took place on 8 April 2012 when he came on as a substitute for Manu del Moral in the final minutes of a 1–0 away defeat against Athletic Bilbao.

In February 2013, Moreno was permanently promoted to the first-team and he scored his first professional goal on 20 October, netting the second in a 2–2 draw at Real Valladolid. He ultimately made 17 appearances during a campaign blemished only by a straight red card he received following a confrontation with Gabi in a 1–1 draw against Atlético Madrid. He enjoyed a breakthrough season in the 2013–14 campaign where he made 44 appearances in total for the club, including 14 in Sevilla's victorious run in the UEFA Europa League. His performances throughout the season also contributed towards Sevilla ending the season fifth in the league and earned him a spot in Spain's provisional squad for the 2014 FIFA World Cup.

On 12 August 2014, on the eve of Sevilla's 2014 UEFA Super Cup match against Real Madrid, Moreno was withdrawn from the club's matchday squad after the club agreed a £12 million deal with Premier League side Liverpool for his signature. Following the match, Moreno was in tears and had to be consoled as he was given a send off by the club's fans. He later explained that he was emotional to be leaving Sevilla as the club was the "club of his life" but that he was equally motivated to succeed at Liverpool.

=== Liverpool ===
On 16 August 2014, Moreno officially completed his move to Liverpool and he made his debut for the club on 25 August, in a 3–1 defeat to Manchester City. He scored his first goal on 31 August, netting the third and final goal in 3–0 away win against Tottenham Hotspur after dispossessing Andros Townsend and sprinting 40 yards to score. He scored again on 29 December, against Swansea City, but ultimately endured an inconsistent debut season at Anfield, with his attacking output not matched by his defensive performances.

Moreno spent the first four games of the next season as a substitute as new signing Joe Gomez started in his position. However, on 20 September 2015, he made his first league start of the season, providing the assist for Danny Ings's first Liverpool goal in a 1–1 draw against Norwich City, and was praised for his man of the match performance. His performance in the UEFA Europa League final, where Liverpool lost 3–1 to his former club Sevilla, was heavily criticised by pundits and journalists for positioning and defensive errors.

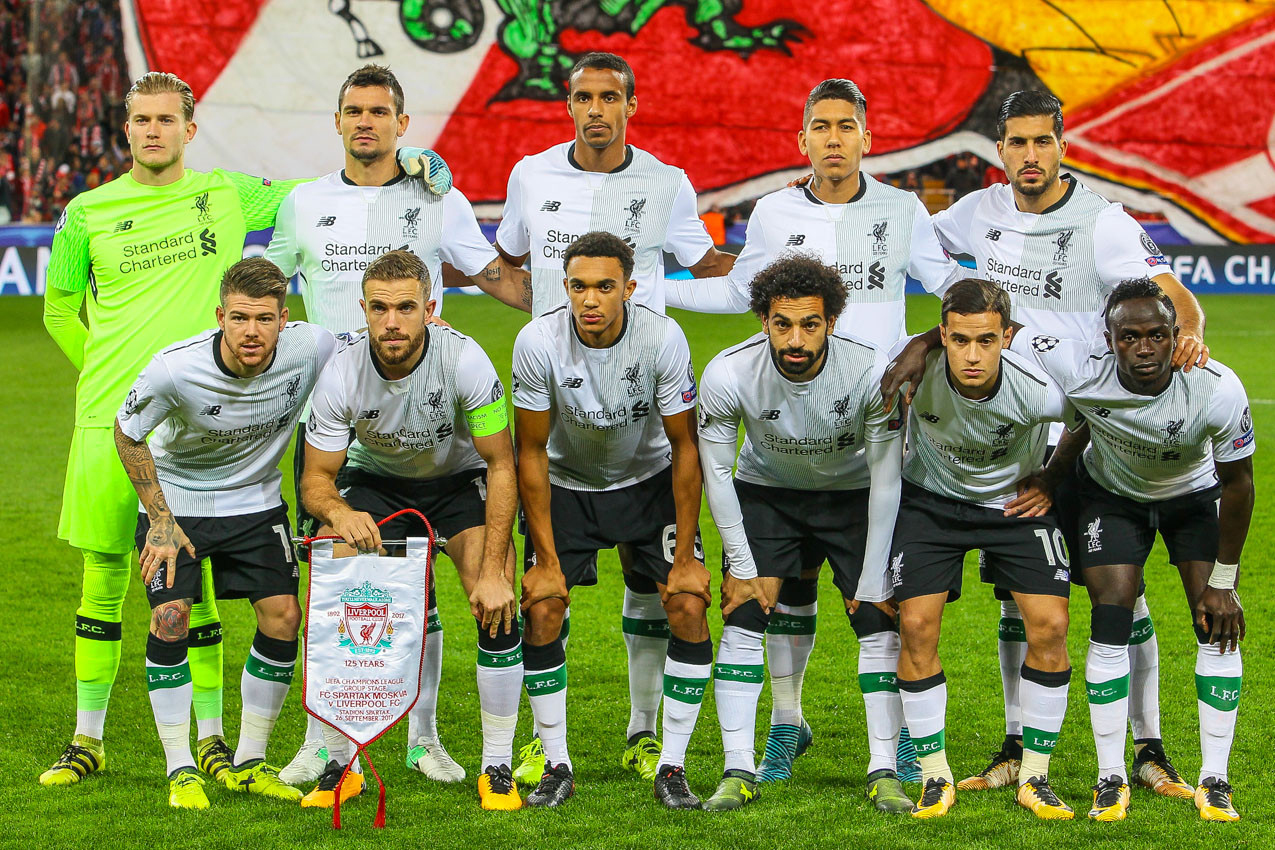
Moreno (bottom-left) lining-up for Liverpool's Champions League match against Spartak Moscow in 2017

On 14 August 2016, Moreno started in Liverpool's first game of the season, a 4–3 win at Arsenal, where he conceded a penalty and was criticised heavily for his performance, prompting a defence from his manager Jürgen Klopp. Despite his manager's intervention, he was dropped and used only as a late substitute for the next game, an 2–0 away defeat against Burnley. He made 18 appearances over the season, just eight as a starter, as James Milner was preferred in his left-back position.

In April 2017, Serie A clubs AC Milan and Inter Milan spoke to Liverpool about a transfer for Moreno, and in June the Reds rejected a €12.5 million bid for him from another Italian club, Napoli.

Moreno played more frequently at the start of the 2017–18 season, but was criticised on 23 November, in a Champions League group game against Sevilla, in which Liverpool led 3–0 at half time but drew 3–3, and was defended by Klopp. He ultimately lost his position to new signing Andy Robertson for the rest of the season.

Despite not playing in the UEFA Champions League final against Tottenham Hotspur on 1 June 2019, Moreno won his first Champions League winner's medal as Liverpool won 2–0. After making just five appearances all season, Moreno was released by Liverpool on 4 June 2019.

=== Villarreal ===
On 9 July 2019, Moreno signed a five-year contract with Villarreal. On 9 September 2020, he was ruled out for an estimated six months with a cruciate ligament injury to the left knee.

On 26 May 2021, Moreno won the UEFA Europa League final with Villarreal, scoring a penalty in the 11–10 shootout.

=== Como ===
On 19 July 2024, Moreno signed a one-year contract with Serie A club Como as a free agent. On 19 June 2026, Moreno left Como after his contract expired without renewal, subsequently making him a free agent.

=== Mallorca ===
On 24 August 2026, Moreno returned to Spain, signing a one-year deal with Segunda División side Mallorca.

== International career ==
=== Youth ===
Moreno represented the Spain under-21s at the 2013 UEFA European Championship, being first-choice as he helped them retain their European title. Following the competition's completion he was announced in UEFA's official team of the tournament.

=== Senior ===
Moreno was called up to the senior team on 4 October 2013 for the last 2014 FIFA World Cup qualifier against Georgia, and he made his debut on 15 October, playing the full 90 minutes in a 2–0 win in Albacete.

Moreno was included in Vicente del Bosque's 30-man provisional list for the tournament in Brazil, but was one of seven players cut from the final squad.

Over three years since his last cap, Moreno was recalled by Julen Lopetegui for friendlies against Costa Rica and Russia in November 2017.

== Personal life ==
Moreno has many tattoos. In April 2016, he had his leg decorated with an image of a gun-toting chimpanzee dressed in a suit and wearing headphones; ESPN FC's verdict was "Please don't ask, because we haven't got the slightest clue." The back of his leg is decorated with the coordinates of his hometown's Plaza de España. Moreno has two children with his partner Lilia Granadilla.

== Career statistics ==
=== Club ===
As of match played 24 October 2026

Appearances and goals by club, season and competition
Club	Season	League			National cup (Note: Includes Copa del Rey, FA Cup and Coppa Italia)		League cup (Note: Includes Football League/EFL Cup)		Europe		Other		Total	
Club	Season	Division	Apps	Goals	Apps	Goals	Apps	Goals	Apps	Goals	Apps	Goals	Apps	Goals
Sevilla Atlético	2010–11	Segunda División B	0	0	—		—		—		1 (Note: Appearance in Segunda División B play-offs)	0	1	0
Sevilla Atlético	2011–12	Segunda División B	30	4	—		—		—		—		30	4
Sevilla Atlético	2012–13	Segunda División B	19	3	—		—		—		—		19	3
Sevilla Atlético	Total		49	7	—		—		—		1	0	50	7
Sevilla	2011–12	La Liga	1	0	0	0	—		0	0	—		1	0
Sevilla	2012–13	La Liga	15	0	2	0	—		—		—		17	0
Sevilla	2013–14	La Liga	29	3	1	0	—		14 (Note: Appearances in UEFA Europa League)	0	—		44	3
Sevilla	Total		45	3	3	0	—		14	0	—		62	3
Liverpool	2014–15	Premier League	28	2	4	0	2	0	7 (Note: Five appearances in UEFA Champions League, two appearances in UEFA Europa League)	0	—		41	2
Liverpool	2015–16	Premier League	32	1	0	0	5	0	13	0	—		50	1
Liverpool	2016–17	Premier League	12	0	3	0	3	0	—		—		18	0
Liverpool	2017–18	Premier League	16	0	1	0	0	0	10 (Note: Appearance(s) in UEFA Champions League)	0	—		27	0
Liverpool	2018–19	Premier League	2	0	1	0	1	0	1	0	—		5	0
Liverpool	Total		90	3	9	0	11	0	31	0	—		141	3
Villarreal	2019–20	La Liga	18	0	1	0	—		—		—		19	0
Villarreal	2020–21	La Liga	5	0	0	0	—		4	0	—		9	0
Villarreal	2021–22	La Liga	24	3	3	2	—		7	1	1 (Note: Appearance in UEFA Super Cup)	0	35	6
Villarreal	2022–23	La Liga	24	0	1	0	—		3 (Note: Appearances in UEFA Europa Conference League)	0	—		28	0
Villarreal	2023–24	La Liga	27	2	2	0	—		4	0	—		33	2
Villarreal	Total		98	5	7	2	—		18	1	1	0	124	8
Como	2024–25	Serie A	24	0	1	0	—		—		—		25	0
Como	2025–26	Serie A	19	2	4	0	—		—		—		23	2
Como	Total		43	2	5	0	—		—		—		48	2
Mallorca	2026–27	Segunda División	5	0	0	0	—		—		5	0		
Career total			330	20	24	2	11	0	63	1	2	0	4:0	23

=== International ===
Appearances and goals by national team and year
National team	Year	Apps	Goals
Spain	2013	2	0
Spain	2014	1	0
Spain	2015	0	0
Spain	2016	0	0
Spain	2017	1	0
Total		4	0

== Honours ==
Sevilla

- UEFA Europa League: 2013–14

Liverpool

- UEFA Champions League: 2018–19; runner-up: 2017–18
- Football League Cup runner-up: 2015–16
- UEFA Europa League runner-up: 2015–16

Villarreal

- UEFA Europa League: 2020–21

Spain U21

- UEFA European Under-21 Championship: 2013

Individual

- UEFA European Under-21 Championship Team of the Tournament: 2013
