= 2013 UEFA European Under-21 Championship =

אליפות אירופה בכדורגל עד גיל 21 - 2013

Tournament details
- Host country: Israel
- Dates: 5–18 June
- Teams: 8 (from 1 confederation)
- Venues: 4 (in 4 host cities)

Final positions
- Champions: Spain (4th title)
- Runners-up: Italy

Tournament statistics
- Matches played: 15
- Goals scored: 45 (3 per match)
- Attendance: 180,432 (12,029 per match)
- Top scorer: (Spain) Álvaro Morata (4 goals)
- Best player: (Spain) Thiago

2013 UEFA European Under-21 Championship, or simply the 2013 Euro Under-21, was the 19th staging of UEFA's European Under-21 Championship. The final tournament was hosted by Israel from 5–18 June 2013.

The Israeli bid was chosen by UEFA's Executive Committee on 27 January 2011 in Nyon, Switzerland. This bid defeated the other bids from Bulgaria, Czech Republic, England and Wales.

Spain defended the title they won two years prior, winning their fourth championship after defeating Italy 4–2 in the final.

== Qualification ==
The draw for the group stage of qualifying for the 2013 UEFA European Under-21 Championship took place on 3 February in Nyon, Switzerland. 52 national teams took part in the qualifying. The group stage of qualifying began on 25 March 2011. There were a total of ten groups, consisting of five or six teams each. All the teams in each group faced each other two times, at home and away. The team at the top of each group and the four best second-placed teams qualified to the playoff round. In the playoff round, the 14 teams were drawn to play seven two-legged matches. The winners joined Israel in the tournament finals.

=== List of qualified teams ===
The following teams qualified for the 2013 UEFA European Under-21 Championship:

- England
- Germany
- Israel (hosts)
- Italy
- Netherlands
- Norway
- Russia
- Spain

== Venues ==
The Competition was played at four venues in major cities all around Israel: Bloomfield (Tel Aviv), Teddy (Jerusalem), HaMoshava (Petah Tikva) and the Netanya Stadium (Netanya).

Jerusalem	2013 UEFA European Under-21 Championship is located in Israel	Netanya
Teddy Stadium	2013 UEFA European Under-21 Championship is located in Israel	Netanya Stadium
Capacity: 31,733	2013 UEFA European Under-21 Championship is located in Israel	Capacity: 13,610
Petah Tikva	2013 UEFA European Under-21 Championship is located in Israel	Tel Aviv
HaMoshava Stadium	2013 UEFA European Under-21 Championship is located in Israel	Bloomfield Stadium
Capacity: 11,500	2013 UEFA European Under-21 Championship is located in Israel	Capacity: 14,413

== Match officials ==
In December 2012, it was announced that these six referees would take charge of matches at the final tournament:

- Ivan Bebek (Croatia)
- Serhiy Boiko (Ukraine)
- Antony Gautier (France)
- Paweł Gil (Poland)
- Ovidiu Haţegan (Romania)
- Matej Jug (Slovenia)

It was furthermore announced that additional assistant referees would be deployed at Israel's final tournament.

== Seeding ==
The draw for the final tournament took place on 28 November 2012 in Tel Aviv. As the highest-ranked team according to the competition coefficient rankings, Spain were one of the top two seeds alongside hosts Israel. Those two sides were drawn into separate groups, as were the second and third-ranked teams in the list, England and the Netherlands. The remaining four countries were unseeded and were placed in the remaining positions in the two four-team sections.

Top seeds	Second seeds	Unseeded
Israel (assigned to A1); Spain (assigned to B1)	England; Netherlands	Italy; Germany; Russia; Norway

== Squads ==
The deadline for the submission of the final 23-man squads was 26 May 2013, ten days before the opening match.

== Group stage ==
The draw for the group stage was held on 28 November 2012 in Tel Aviv.

All times are local (UTC+3).

=== Group A ===
Pos	Team	Pld	W	D	L	GF	GA	GD	Pts	Group stage result
1	Italy	3	2	1	0	6	1	+5	7	Advance to knockout stage
2	Norway	3	1	2	0	6	4	+2	5	Advance to knockout stage
3	Israel (H)	3	1	1	1	3	6	−3	4	
4	England	3	0	0	3	1	5	−4	0	

(H) Hosts
5 June 2013
19:00

Israel	2–2	Norway
Biton 16' (pen.); Turgeman 71'	Report	Pedersen 24'; Singh 90+2'

Netanya Stadium, Netanya, Israel
Attendance: 10,850
Referee: Paweł Gil (Poland)
5 June 2013
21:30

England	0–1	Italy
	Report	Insigne 79'

Bloomfield Stadium, Tel Aviv, Israel
Attendance: 10,660
Referee: Antony Gautier (France)

8 June 2013
19:00

England	1–3	Norway
Dawson 57' (pen.)	Report	Berge 15'; Berget 34'; Eikrem 52'

HaMoshava Stadium, Petah Tikva, Israel
Attendance: 6,150
Referee: Serhiy Boiko (Ukraine)
8 June 2013
21:30

Italy	4–0	Israel
Saponara 18'; Gabbiadini 42', 53'; Florenzi 71'	Report

Bloomfield Stadium, Tel Aviv, Israel
Attendance: 13,750
Referee: Ovidiu Haţegan (Romania)

11 June 2013
19:00

Israel	1–0	England
Kriaf 80'	Report

Teddy Stadium, Jerusalem, Israel
Attendance: 22,183
Referee: Serhiy Boiko (Ukraine)
11 June 2013
19:00

Norway	1–1	Italy
Strandberg 90' (pen.)	Report	Bertolacci 90+4'

Bloomfield Stadium, Tel Aviv, Israel
Attendance: 7,130
Referee: Ivan Bebek (Croatia)

=== Group B ===
Pos	Team	Pld	W	D	L	GF	GA	GD	Pts	Group stage result
1	Spain	3	3	0	0	5	0	+5	9	Advance to knockout stage
2	Netherlands	3	2	0	1	8	6	+2	6	Advance to knockout stage
3	Germany	3	1	0	2	4	5	−1	3	
4	Russia	3	0	0	3	2	8	−6	0	

6 June 2013
19:00

Spain	1–0	Russia
Morata 82'	Report

Teddy Stadium, Jerusalem, Israel
Attendance: 8,127
Referee: Matej Jug (Slovenia)
6 June 2013
21:30

Netherlands	3–2	Germany
Maher 24'; Wijnaldum 38'; Fer 90'	Report	Rudy 47' (pen.); Holtby 81'

HaMoshava Stadium, Petah Tikva, Israel
Attendance: 10,248
Referee: Ivan Bebek (Croatia)

9 June 2013
19:00

Netherlands	5–1	Russia
Wijnaldum 38'; De Jong 61'; John 69'; Hoesen 83'; Fer 90+2'	Report	Cheryshev 65'

Teddy Stadium, Jerusalem, Israel
Attendance: 8,589
Referee: Antony Gautier (France)
9 June 2013
21:30

Germany	0–1	Spain
	Report	Morata 86'

Netanya Stadium, Netanya, Israel
Attendance: 11,750
Referee: Paweł Gil (Poland)

12 June 2013
19:00

Spain	3–0	Netherlands
Morata 26'; Isco 32'; Vázquez 90+1'	Report

HaMoshava Stadium, Petah Tikva, Israel
Attendance: 10,024
Referee: Ovidiu Haţegan (Romania)
12 June 2013
19:00

Russia	1–2	Germany
Dzagoev 22'	Report	Herrmann 34'; Rudy 69' (pen.)

Netanya Stadium, Netanya, Israel
Attendance: 8,134
Referee: Matej Jug (Slovenia)

== Knockout stage ==
=== Bracket ===
Semi-finals
15 June – Netanya
Spain	3
Norway	0
15 June – Petah Tikva
Italy	1
Netherlands	0

Final
18 June – Jerusalem
Spain	4
Italy	2

=== Semifinals ===
15 June 2013
18:30

Spain	3–0	Norway
Rodrigo 45+1'; Isco 87'; Morata 90+3'	Report

Netanya Stadium, Netanya, Israel
Attendance: 12,048
Referee: Serhiy Boiko (Ukraine)

15 June 2013
21:30

Italy	1–0	Netherlands
Borini 79'	Report

HaMoshava Stadium, Petah Tikva, Israel
Attendance: 10,123
Referee: Ovidiu Haţegan (Romania)

=== Final ===
18 June 2013
19:00

Spain	4–2	Italy
Thiago 6', 31', 38' (pen.); Isco 66' (pen.)	Report	Immobile 10'; Borini 80'

Teddy Stadium, Jerusalem, Israel
Attendance: 29,320
Referee: Matej Jug (Slovenia)

== Team of the Tournament ==
The UEFA Technical Team was charged with naming a squad composed of the 23 best players over the course of the tournament. Spain, with eleven, had the most players in the team of the tournament.

UEFA Team of the Tournament

Goalkeepers	Defenders	Midfielders	Forwards
(Spain) David de Gea	(Spain) Alberto Moreno	(Spain) Asier Illarramendi	(Spain) Álvaro Morata
(Italy) Francesco Bardi	(Spain) Iñigo Martínez	(Spain) Isco	(Spain) Rodrigo
(Norway) Ørjan Nyland	(Spain) Marc Bartra	(Spain) Koke	(Italy) Fabio Borini
	(Spain) Martín Montoya	(Spain) Thiago	(Netherlands) Georginio Wijnaldum
	(Italy) Luca Caldirola	(Germany) Lewis Holtby	(Netherlands) Luuk de Jong
	(Netherlands) Bruno Martins Indi	(Italy) Marco Verratti
	(Norway) Stefan Strandberg	(Netherlands) Adam Maher
		(Russia) Alan Dzagoev

== Goalscorers ==
4 goals

- (Spain) Álvaro Morata

3 goals

- (Spain) Thiago (1 assist — silver boot winner)
- (Spain) Isco (0 assists — bronze boot winner)

2 goals

- (Germany) Sebastian Rudy
- (Italy) Manolo Gabbiadini
- (Italy) Fabio Borini
- (Netherlands) Georginio Wijnaldum
- (Netherlands) Leroy Fer

1 goal

- (England) Craig Dawson
- (Germany) Lewis Holtby
- (Germany) Patrick Herrmann
- (Israel) Alon Turgeman
- (Israel) Nir Biton
- (Israel) Ofir Kriaf
- (Italy) Alessandro Florenzi
- (Italy) Andrea Bertolacci
- (Italy) Ciro Immobile
- (Italy) Lorenzo Insigne
- (Italy) Riccardo Saponara
- (Netherlands) Adam Maher
- (Netherlands) Danny Hoesen
- (Netherlands) Luuk de Jong
- (Netherlands) Ola John
- (Norway) Fredrik Semb Berge
- (Norway) Harmeet Singh
- (Norway) Jo Inge Berget
- (Norway) Magnus Wolff Eikrem
- (Norway) Marcus Pedersen
- (Norway) Stefan Strandberg
- (Russia) Alan Dzagoev
- (Russia) Denis Cheryshev
- (Spain) Álvaro Vázquez
- (Spain) Rodrigo

== Official match ball ==
The official ball for the UEFA European Under-21 Championship was unveiled during the draw in Tel Aviv on 28 November 2012. The ball had the same blue and white colours as tournament hosts Israel and its design featured the same thermally bonded triangular patterns as the Adidas Tango 12, match ball of UEFA Euro 2012.

== Calls to boycott tournament ==
After Israel was announced as host, there were calls by some to boycott the tournament. The most prominent petition against the tournament taking place in Israel was organised by the Palestine Solidarity Campaign, which demanded UEFA President Michel Platini reverse his decision. Another petition organised by Muslim Public Affairs Committee UK demanded that UEFA move the tournament to England after the UEFA considered asking the FA to be on standby if the Gaza-Israel conflict continued.

Another petition, organised by former Sevilla footballer Frédéric Kanouté and containing the name of 50 professional footballers who had signed it, also gained media attention but attracted criticism when some of the names listed on it were disputed. Didier Drogba, for example, claimed he never signed the petition and his name was removed from the list.

== Broadcast from UEFA European Under-21 Championship ==
=== Américas ===
- United States: ESPN, ESPN 2 or ESPN 3 (All matches live in Pay TV)
- Brazil: SporTV
- Spanish speaking Latin America: DirecTV Sports (South América and Caribbean) / SKY (Mexico and Central América) (All matches live on Channels of DirecTV Sports in South América and Caribbean / Sky Sports in Mexico and Central América).

Free TV

- Uruguay: Monte Carlo TV
- Paraguay: SNT (Channel 9) and Paravisión (Channel 5)
- Ecuador: RTS (Canal 6) and LaTele (Channel 14).
- Chile: Telecanal
- Peru ATV (Channel 9) and Global TV (Channel 13)
- Venezuela: RCTV and TVes

== See also ==
- 2013 UEFA European Under-21 Championship squads
- 2013 UEFA European Under-21 Championship Final
- 2013 UEFA European Under-21 Championship qualification
